= List of Sydney Thunder cricketers =

The Sydney Thunder are an Australian cricket club who play in the Big Bash League, the national domestic Twenty20 competition. The club was established in 2011 as an inaugural member of the eight-club league. The Big Bash League consists of a regular season and a finals series of the top five teams. This list includes players who have played at least one match for the Thunder in the Big Bash League.

== List of players ==
Correct as of 25 March 2020.

Players are listed according to the date of their debut for the Thunder. All statistics are for Big Bash League only.

- The number to the left of player name represents 'cap'. For players who debuted for club in the same match, player caps are ordered by alphabetical order of last name.
- In category "Debut" games are listed as Tournament/Round. e.g. BBL02/8 would equate to 2012–13 Big Bash League, Sydney Thunder's 8th Match of the tournament.
- Hover over column headings for key

Sydney Thunder players						Batting				Fielding		Bowling				
	Player	Nat	Seasons	Debut	Mat	Runs	HS	Ave	SR	Ct	St	Wkts	BBI	Ave	Econ	SR
1	Sean Abbott	(Australia)	2011–2013	BBL01/1	14	130	39	16.25	111.11	9	0	10	2/17	33.30	8.84	22.6
2	Doug Bollinger	(Australia)	2011	BBL01/1	2	—	—	—	—	0	0	2	2/22	24.50	8.16	18.0
3	Scott Coyte	(Australia)	2011–2014	BBL01/1	13	85	33	14.16	149.12	5	0	8	2/14	37.87	7.01	32.3
4	Luke Doran	(Australia)	2011–2013	BBL01/1	10	5	4	5.00	100.00	1	0	5	2/26	37.40	6.67	33.6
5	Ben Dunk	(Australia)	2011–2012	BBL01/1	7	59	19*	9.83	70.23	2	0	—	—	—	—	—
6	Fidel Edwards	(Cricket West Indies)	2011–2012	BBL01/1	5	0	0*	—	0.00	1	0	6	2/33	25.50	7.65	20.0
7	Chris Gayle	(Cricket West Indies)	2011–2013	BBL01/1	14	389	100*	29.92	125.48	4	0	6	2/5	32.33	7.18	27.0
8	Usman Khawaja	(Australia)	2011–2020	BBL01/1	42	1380	109*	37.29	129.33	10	0	—	—	—	—	—
9	Craig Philipson	(Australia)	2011	BBL01/1	2	4	2	2.00	26.66	0	0	—	—	—	—	—
10	Daniel Smith	(Australia)	2011–2012	BBL01/1	7	44	21	6.28	65.67	0	0	—	—	—	—	—
11	David Warner	(Australia)	2011–2013	BBL01/1	2	152	102*	152.00	185.36	4	0	—	—	—	—	—
12	Jason Floros	(Australia)	2011–2014	BBL01/2	12	120	37*	17.14	103.44	5	0	0	—	—	7.92	—
13	Luke Butterworth	(Australia)	2011–2012	BBL01/3	4	7	5	3.50	50.00	2	0	4	2/27	23.25	7.97	17.5
14	Tim Cruickshank	(Australia)	2011–2012	BBL01/3	3	17	15	5.66	56.66	0	0	—	—	—	—	—
15	Tim Armstrong	(Australia)	2012	BBL01/6	3	29	25	14.50	74.35	0	0	—	—	—	—	—
16	Trent Copeland	(Australia)	2012	BBL01/6	1	1	1	1.00	33.33	0	0	0	—	—	10.00	—
17	Nicholas Bills	(Australia)	2012	BBL01/7	1	—	—	—	—	0	0	2	2/44	22.00	11.00	12.0
18	Matthew Day	(Australia)	2012	BBL01/7	1	29	29*	—	145.00	1	0	0	—	—	12.50	—
19	Cameron Borgas	(Australia)	2012–2014	BBL02/1	7	39	11	5.57	78.00	2	0	—	—	—	—	—
20	Ryan Carters	(Australia)	2012–2014	BBL02/1	16	144	33*	13.09	91.71	12	2	—	—	—	—	—
21	Martin Guptill	(New Zealand)	2012	BBL02/1	1	20	20	20.00	74.07	0	0	—	—	—	—	—
22	Rhett Lockyear	(Australia)	2012	BBL02/1	1	4	4	4.00	33.33	0	0	0	—	—	6.00	—
23	Dirk Nannes	(Australia)	2012–2015	BBL02/1	20	3	3*	—	75.00	2	0	23	4/17	22.43	7.15	18.8
24	Chris Rogers	(Australia)	2012	BBL02/1	6	87	24	14.50	90.62	1	0	—	—	—	—	—
25	Gurinder Sandhu	(Australia)	2012–2020	BBL02/1	47	52	11*	7.42	88.13	12	0	41	3/19	30.41	8.07	22.6
26	Chris Tremain	(Australia)	2012–2020	BBL02/1	23	45	37*	15.00	121.62	3	0	17	2/27	38.88	8.43	27.6
27	Mark Cosgrove	(Australia)	2012–2015	BBL02/2	6	87	22	14.50	82.85	1	0	—	—	—	—	—
28	Azhar Mahmood	(Pakistan)	2012	BBL02/2	3	25	23	8.33	83.33	0	0	2	2/18	40.00	8.88	27.0
29	Adam Zampa	(Australia)	2012–2013	BBL02/3	6	18	8	3.60	69.23	0	0	5	3/26	30.80	8.40	22.0
30	Simon Keen	(Australia)	2012–2013	BBL02/4	5	66	24	13.20	122.22	2	0	1	1/28	38.00	9.50	24.0
31	Matt Prior	(England)	2012–2013	BBL02/5	4	32	17	8.00	68.08	1	0	—	—	—	—	—
32	Blake Dean	(Australia)	2013	BBL03/1	1	3	3	3.00	50.00	0	0	1	1/29	29.00	14.50	12.0
33	Luke Feldman	(Australia)	2013–2014	BBL03/1	5	—	—	—	—	0	0	4	2/43	36.75	8.16	27.0
34	Michael Hussey	(Australia)	2013–2016	BBL03/1	23	741	96	39.00	133.75	9	0	—	—	—	—	—
35	Eoin Morgan	(England)	2013–2017	BBL03/1	13	318	71*	31.80	120.00	5	0	—	—	—	—	—
36	Carl Sandri	(Australia)	2013	BBL03/1	2	22	13	22.00	146.66	2	0	2	1/20	26.50	8.83	18.0
37	Chris Woakes	(England)	2013	BBL03/1	2	8	8*	—	80.00	0	0	2	1/31	31.00	7.75	24.0
38	Daniel Hughes	(Australia)	2013–2015	BBL03/2	13	179	40*	19.88	103.46	7	0	—	—	—	—	—
39	Kurtis Patterson	(Australia)	2013–2018	BBL03/2	25	438	48	19.90	108.95	9	0	—	—	—	—	—
40	Tillakaratne Dilshan	(Sri Lanka)	2014	BBL03/3	4	62	46	15.50	126.53	1	0	0	—	—	9.24	—
41	Ajantha Mendis	(Sri Lanka)	2014	BBL03/5	3	13	8	6.50	118.18	1	0	3	2/15	25.00	6.25	24.0
42	Andrew Tye	(Australia)	2014	BBL03/6	3	16	9	8.00	94.11	0	0	2	1/20	39.50	7.18	33.0
43	Pat Cummins	(Australia)	2014–2019	BBL04/1	12	152	39	38.00	133.33	4	0	13	2/21	29.23	8.32	21.0
44	Chris Hartley	(Australia)	2014–2016	BBL04/1	17	37	23	9.25	82.22	8	3	—	—	—	—	—
45	Nathan Hauritz	(Australia)	2014–2015	BBL04/1	8	12	12	12.00	133.33	3	0	6	2/34	27.83	9.02	18.5
46	Jacques Kallis	(South Africa)	2014–2016	BBL04/1	16	372	97*	28.61	119.61	5	0	10	2/18	30.50	6.93	26.4
47	Andrew McDonald	(Australia)	2014–2016	BBL04/1	6	66	23	13.20	86.84	1	0	4	3/20	14.25	9.50	9.0
48	Aiden Blizzard	(Australia)	2014–2018	BBL04/2	21	390	80*	26.00	118.54	1	0	—	—	—	—	—
49	Josh Lalor	(Australia)	2015	BBL04/4	5	1	1*	—	100.00	2	0	7	4/29	16.28	8.34	11.7
50	Jason Roy	(England)	2015	BBL04/5	3	18	14*	9.00	163.63	2	0	—	—	—	—	—
51	Ahillen Beadle	(Australia)	2015	BBL04/6	3	7	7	7.00	100.00	0	0	1	1/39	61.00	7.62	48.0
52	Ian Moran	(Australia)	2015	BBL04/6	1	—	—	—	—	0	0	1	1/19	19.00	19.00	6.0
53	Cameron Delport	(South Africa)	2015	BBL04/8	1	30	30	30.00	103.44	0	0	—	—	—	—	—
54	Jake Doran	(Australia)	2015–2016	BBL04/8	4	3	3	1.50	60.00	0	0	—	—	—	—	—
55	Chris Green	(Australia)	2015–2020	BBL04/8	48	351	49	18.47	135.52	28	0	33	3/27	30.63	7.06	26.0
56	Fawad Ahmed	(Australia)	2015–2019	BBL05/1	42	11	5*	5.50	55.00	8	0	40	4/14	25.45	6.97	21.9
57	Clint McKay	(Australia)	2015–2017	BBL05/1	17	55	14*	18.33	125.00	6	0	22	4/28	21.45	8.45	15.2
58	Ben Rohrer	(Australia)	2015–2018	BBL05/1	28	386	48	24.12	133.56	11	0	—	—	—	—	—
59	Andre Russell	(Cricket West Indies)	2015–2017	BBL05/1	15	210	46	17.50	159.09	7	0	19	3/13	23.36	7.97	17.5
60	Shane Watson	(Australia)	2015–2019	BBL05/1	40	1014	100	26.68	133.94	10	0	19	3/13	27.78	8.25	20.2
61	Nathan McAndrew	(Australia)	2016–2020	BBL05/8	14	19	10*	19.00	126.66	7	0	6	2/22	43.33	8.47	30.6
62	Henry Nicholls	(New Zealand)	2016	BBL05/8	2	38	35*	38.00	122.58	3	0	—	—	—	—	—
63	Ryan Gibson	(Australia)	2016–2018	BBL06/1	13	131	53	14.55	93.57	4	0	—	—	—	—	—
64	Arjun Nair	(Australia)	2016–2020	BBL06/2	32	223	45	20.27	118.61	9	0	21	3/12	26.85	7.72	20.8
65	Jay Lenton	(Australia)	2017–2020	BBL06/4	20	131	27*	21.83	136.45	11	4	—	—	—	—	—
66	Carlos Brathwaite	(Cricket West Indies)	2017	BBL06/6	3	7	6	3.50	116.66	1	0	6	3/21	14.16	7.72	11.0
67	James Vince	(England)	2017–2018	BBL06/8	6	149	44	24.83	137.96	0	0	—	—	—	—	—
68	Jos Buttler	(England)	2017–2019	BBL07/1	13	475	89	36.53	138.48	6	0	—	—	—	—	—
69	Andrew Fekete	(Australia)	2017	BBL07/1	3	1	1	1.00	14.28	0	0	1	1/37	94.00	9.55	59.0
70	Mitchell McClenaghan	(New Zealand)	2017–2018	BBL07/1	10	10	9	3.33	76.92	3	0	11	2/19	32.81	9.17	21.4
71	Callum Ferguson	(Australia)	2017–2020	BBL07/3	38	920	113*	29.67	127.24	9	0	—	—	—	—	—
72	Sam Rainbird	(Australia)	2018–2019	BBL08/1	7	0	0*	0.00	0.00	2	0	3	2/25	52.66	9.77	32.3
73	Joe Root	(England)	2018–2019	BBL08/1	7	93	26	15.50	114.81	3	0	0	—	—	7.00	—
74	Daniel Sams	(Australia)	2018–2020	BBL08/1	31	230	42	9.20	119.17	8	0	45	4/34	17.26	8.19	12.6
75	Jason Sangha	(Australia)	2018–2019	BBL08/1	12	178	63*	22.25	107.87	2	0	0	—	—	11.00	—
76	Jonathan Cook	(Australia)	2018–2020	BBL08/2	21	19	12*	9.50	95.00	5	0	21	4/21	24.42	7.32	20.0
77	Anton Devcich	(New Zealand)	2019	BBL08/8	7	91	26	13.00	104.59	1	0	1	1/9	17.00	8.50	12.0
78	Chris Jordan	(England)	2019	BBL08/8	7	2	1	1.00	40.00	6	0	5	2/44	38.60	8.97	25.8
79	Matthew Gilkes	(Australia)	2019–2020	BBL08/11	11	144	51	18.00	104.34	5	0	—	—	—	—	—
80	Baxter Holt	(Australia)	2019	BBL08/12	2	41	37	41.00	124.24	2	1	—	—	—	—	—
81	Alex Hales	(England)	2019–2020	BBL09/1	17	576	85	38.40	146.93	9	0	—	—	—	—	—
82	Alex Ross	(Australia)	2019–2020	BBL09/1	17	372	58	37.20	130.06	7	0	—	—	—	—	—
83	Chris Morris	(South Africa)	2019–2020	BBL09/3	15	112	21	12.44	147.36	7	0	22	3/27	19.36	8.01	14.5
84	Brendan Doggett	(Australia)	2020	BBL09/6	8	—	—	—	—	1	0	3	1/13	61.66	8.40	44.0
85	Liam Bowe	(Australia)	2020	BBL09/9	5	0	0	0.00	0.00	0	0	3	2/23	31.33	7.83	24.0

Source: ESPN Cricinfo Thunder Batting records and ESPN Cricinfo Thunder Bowling and Fielding records

== See also ==
- List of Big Bash League cricketers
