= 2017–18 Sydney Thunder season =

Thunder Of Sydney

Sydney Thunder
2017–18 season
- Coach: (South Africa) Paddy Upton
- Captain(s): (Australia) Shane Watson
- Home ground: Spotless Stadium, Sydney

The 2017–18 Sydney Thunder Season will be the 7th season in the club's history. Coached by Paddy Upton and captained by Shane Watson, the Thunder will compete in the 2017–18 Big Bash League.

== Ladder ==
Pos	Team	Pld	W	L	NR	Pts	NRR	Qualification
1	Perth Scorchers	10	8	2	0	16	0.154	Advanced to semi-finals
2	Adelaide Strikers (C)	10	7	3	0	14	0.801	Advanced to semi-finals
3	Melbourne Renegades	10	6	4	0	12	0.297	Advanced to semi-finals
4	Hobart Hurricanes	10	5	5	0	10	−0.291	Advanced to semi-finals
5	Sydney Sixers	10	4	6	0	8	0.331	
6	Sydney Thunder	10	4	6	0	8	−0.039	
7	Brisbane Heat	10	4	6	0	8	−0.437	
8	Melbourne Stars	10	2	8	0	4	−0.926	

(C) Champions

== Squad ==
Num	Name	State	Batting Style	Bowling Style
Batsmen
6	Aiden Blizzard	(Australian Capital Territory)	Left-Handed	Left-Arm Medium
TBC	Callum Ferguson	(South Australia)	Right-Handed	Right-Arm Medium
77	Ryan Gibson	(New South Wales)	Right-Handed	Right-Arm Medium
18	Usman Khawaja	(Queensland)	Left-Handed	Right-Arm Medium
17	Kurtis Patterson	(New South Wales)	Left-Handed	Right-Arm Off Spin
99	Ben Rohrer	(New South Wales)	Left-Handed	Right-Arm Medium
	All-Rounders			
7	Arjun Nair	(New South Wales)	Right-Handed	Right-Arm Off Spin
33	Shane Watson (c)	(New South Wales)	Right-Hander	Right-Arm Fast-Medium
	Wicket Keepers			
63	Jos Buttler (os)	(England)	Right-Handed	Left-Arm Medium
	Bowlers			
52	Fawad Ahmed	(Victoria (state))	Right Handed	Right-Arm Leg Spin
30	Pat Cummins	(New South Wales)	Right-Handed	Right-Arm Fast
11	Andrew Fekete	(Queensland)	Right-Handed	Right-Arm Fast-Medium
93	Chris Green	(New South Wales)	Right-Handed	Right-Arm Off Spin
44	Nathan McAndrew	(Australian Capital Territory)	Right-Handed	Right-Arm Fast-Medium
81	Mitchell McClenaghan (os)	(New Zealand)	Left-Handed	Left-Arm Fast-Medium
27	Clint McKay	(Victoria (state))	Right-Handed	Right-Arm Fast-Medium
28	Gurinder Sandhu	(New South Wales)	Left-Handed	Right-Arm Fast-Medium

- (c) = Captain
- (os) = Overseas Player

== Matches ==
=== Match 1 ===
19 December 2017
7:45pm (D/N)
Scorecard

Sydney Sixers; 9/149 (20 overs)	v	Sydney Thunder (H); 5/150 (20 overs)
Sam Billings 32 (21); Fawad Ahmed 2/11 (4 overs)		Shane Watson 77 (46); Daniel Sams 4/14 (4 overs)

Sydney Thunder won by 5 wickets
Spotless Stadium, Sydney
Attendance: 21,589
Umpires: Gerard Abood and Phillip Gillespie
Player of the match: Shane Watson (Thunder)

- Sydney Thunder won the toss and elected to field.
- Daniel Sams (Sixers) made his T20 debut.

=== Match 2 ===
22 December 2017
7:10pm (D/N)
Scorecard

Adelaide Strikers (H); 6/163 (20 overs)	v	Sydney Thunder; 110 (17.4 overs)
Alex Carey 44 (26); Arjun Nair 3/36 (4 overs)		Kurtis Patterson 48 (37); Ben Laughlin 4/26 (3.4 overs)

Adelaide Strikers won by 53 runs
Adelaide Oval, Adelaide
Attendance: 36,278
Umpires: Greg Davidson and Simon Lightbody
Player of the match: Rashid Khan (Strikers)

- Adelaide Strikers won the toss and elected to bat.

=== Match 3 ===
27 December 2017
6:10pm (D/N)
Scorecard

Sydney Thunder; 4/149 (17 overs)	v	Brisbane Heat (H); 4/153 (16.5 overs)
Shane Watson 56 (34); Shadab Khan 2/27 (4 overs)		Joe Burns 45* (35); Mitchell McClenaghan 2/45 (4 overs)

Brisbane Heat won by 6 wickets (D/L)
The Gabba, Brisbane
Attendance: 34,343
Umpires: Gerard Abood and Tony Wilds
Player of the match: Alex Ross (Heat)

- Sydney Thunder won the toss and elected to bat.
- Both innings were reduced to 17 overs due to a rain delay, with Brisbane Heat set a target of 151 to win by the D/L method.

=== Match 4 ===
30 December 2017
7:10pm (D/N)
Scorecard

Sydney Thunder; 5/166 (20 overs)	v	Hobart Hurricanes (H); 109 (19.3 overs)
Jos Buttler 67 (41); Clive Rose 2/20 (4 overs)		Alex Doolan 34 (32); Fawad Ahmed 2/14 (4 overs)

Sydney Thunder won by 57 runs
University of Tasmania Stadium, Launceston
Attendance: 16,734
Umpires: Greg Davidson and Simon Fry
Player of the match: Jos Buttler (Thunder)

- Hobart Hurricanes won the toss and elected to field.
- Tom Rogers (Hurricanes) made his T20 debut.

=== Match 5 ===
1 January 2018
6:10pm (D/N)
Scorecard

Hobart Hurricanes; 3/189 (20 overs)	v	Sydney Thunder (H)
D'Arcy Short 97 (63); Fawad Ahmed 1/27 (4 overs)

Innings Break
Spotless Stadium, Sydney

- Sydney Thunder won the toss and elected to field.

=== Match 6 ===
7 January 2018
7:10pm (D/N)

Sydney Thunder	v	Adelaide Strikers

Spotless Stadium, Sydney

=== Match 7 ===
11 January 2018
7:40pm (D/N)

Sydney Thunder	v	Perth Scorchers

Spotless Stadium, Sydney

=== Match 8 ===
13 January 2018
7:20pm (D/N)

Sydney Sixers	v	Sydney Thunder

Sydney Cricket Ground, Sydney

=== Match 9 ===
20 January 2018
6:10pm (D/N)

Melbourne Stars	v	Sydney Thunder

Melbourne Cricket Ground, Melbourne

=== Match 10 ===
24 January 2018
7:40pm (D/N)

Sydney Thunder	v	Melbourne Renegades

Manuka Oval, Canberra
