= 2015–16 Sydney Thunder season =

Sydney Thunder
2015–16 season
- Coach: Paddy Upton
- Captain(s): Michael Hussey
- Home ground: Sydney Showground Stadium, Sydney
- BBL: 4th
- BBL Finals: Winners
- Leading Run Scorer: Usman Khawaja (345)
- Leading Wicket Taker: Clint McKay (18)
- Highest home attendance: 21,500 vs Strikers (28 December 2015)
- Lowest home attendance: 18,287 vs Sixers (17 December 2015)
- Average home attendance: 19,333

== Ladder ==
| Pos | Team | Pld | W | L | NR | Pts | NRR | Qualification |
|---|---|---|---|---|---|---|---|---|
| 1 | Adelaide Strikers | 8 | 7 | 1 | 0 | 14 | 0.544 | Advanced to semi-finals |
| 2 | Melbourne Stars | 8 | 5 | 3 | 0 | 10 | 0.366 | Advanced to semi-finals |
| 3 | Perth Scorchers | 8 | 5 | 3 | 0 | 10 | 0.181 | Advanced to semi-finals |
| 4 | Sydney Thunder (C) | 8 | 4 | 4 | 0 | 8 | 0.375 | Advanced to semi-finals |
| 5 | Melbourne Renegades | 8 | 3 | 5 | 0 | 6 | −0.041 | |
| 6 | Brisbane Heat | 8 | 3 | 5 | 0 | 6 | −0.204 | |
| 7 | Hobart Hurricanes | 8 | 3 | 5 | 0 | 6 | −0.955 | |
| 8 | Sydney Sixers | 8 | 2 | 6 | 0 | 4 | −0.330 | |

(C) Champions

=== Ladder progress ===
| Round | 1 | 2 | 3 | 4 | 5 | 6 | 7 | 8 |
|---|---|---|---|---|---|---|---|---|
| Ground | H | A | H | A | A | H | H | A |
| Result | W | W | W | L | L | L | L | W |
| Position | 1 | 2 | 1 | 2 | 3 | 4 | 5 | 3 |

Source: Competitive Matches
A = Away; H = Home; W = Win; D = Draw; L = Lose

=== Regular season ===
17 December
19:40 (D/N)
Scorecard

| (H) Sydney Thunder; 4/158 (20 overs) | v | Sydney Sixers; 122 (19.5 overs) |
| Michael Hussey 80* (59); Trent Lawford 1/12 (2 overs) | | Michael Lumb 34 (27); Andre Russell 3/13 (4 overs) |

Sydney Thunder won by 36 runs
Spotless Stadium
Attendance: 18,287
Umpires: Geoff Joshua and Paul Wilson
Player of the match: Michael Hussey (Thunder)

- Sydney Thunder won the toss and elected to bat.

20 December
19:25 (D/N)
Scorecard

| Sydney Thunder; 6/178 (20 overs) | v | Melbourne Stars (H); 5/177 (20 overs) |
| Usman Khawaja 109* (70); Glenn Maxwell 2/28 (4 overs) | | Kevin Pietersen 76 (42); Andre Russell 2/28 (4 overs) |

Sydney Thunder won by 1 run
Melbourne Cricket Ground
Attendance: 18,809
Umpires: Shawn Craig and Paul Wilson
Player of the match: Usman Khawaja (Thunder)

- Melbourne Stars won the toss and elected to field.

28 December
19:10 (D/N)
Scorecard

| Adelaide Strikers; 9/117 (20 overs) | v | Sydney Thunder (H); 3/121 (16.3 overs) |
| Brad Hodge 34 (33); Clint McKay 2/18 (3 overs) | | Jacques Kallis 49* (48); Ben Laughlin 2/22 (2.3 overs) |

Sydney Thunder won by 7 wickets
Spotless Stadium
Attendance: 21,500
Umpires: Gerard Abood and Greg Davidson
Player of the match: Andre Russell (Thunder)

- Adelaide Strikers won the toss and elected to bat.
- The crowd of 21,500 is the highest attendance for a cricket match at Spotless Stadium and the second highest attendance for any sport at the stadium.
- Billy Stanlake (Strikers) made his T20 debut.

1 January
19:10 (D/N)
Scorecard

| (H) Hobart Hurricanes; 6/163 (20 overs) | v | Sydney Thunder; 9/152 (20 overs) |
| George Bailey 56* (29); Clint McKay 4/28 (3 overs) | | Michael Hussey 71 (51); Shaun Tait 3/16 (4 overs) |

Hobart Hurricanes won by 11 runs
Blundstone Arena
Attendance: 17,151
Umpires: Phillip Gillespie and Geoff Joshua
Player of the match: Shaun Tait (Hurricanes)

- Sydney Thunder won the toss and elected to field.
- The crowd of 17,151 is the highest crowd at Blundstone Arena for a cricket match and the second highest crowd for any sport at the stadium.

3 January
18:10 (D/N)
Scorecard

| Sydney Thunder; 5/186 (20 overs) | v | Brisbane Heat (H); 4/189 (19.3 overs) |
| Michael Hussey 56 (43); Samuel Badree 1/26 (4 overs) | | Chris Lynn 75 (32); Andre Russell 2/28 (4 overs) |

Brisbane Heat won by 6 wickets
The Gabba
Attendance: 27,507
Umpires: Simon Fry and Michael Graham-Smith
Player of the match: Chris Lynn (Heat)

- Brisbane Heat won the toss and elected to field.

7 January
19:40 (D/N)
Scorecard

| Perth Scorchers; 5/175 (20 overs) | v | Sydney Thunder (H); 9/145 (20 overs) |
| Cameron Bancroft 72 (53); Andre Russell 2/31 (4 overs) | | Andre Russell 42 (20); Andrew Tye 3/22 (4 overs) |

Perth Scorchers won by 30 runs
Spotless Stadium
Attendance: 18,942
Umpires: Greg Davidson and Paul Wilson
Player of the match: Cameron Bancroft (Scorchers)

- Sydney Thunder won the toss and elected to field.

11 January
19:40 (D/N)
Scorecard

| (H) Sydney Thunder; 5/173 (20 overs) | v | Melbourne Renegades; 5/176 (19.2 overs) |
| Usman Khawaja 62 (42); Dwayne Bravo 2/26 (4 overs) | | Cameron White 61 (46); Andre Russell 2/42 (4 overs) |

Melbourne Renegades won by 5 wickets
Spotless Stadium
Attendance: 18,602
Umpires: Gerard Abood and Shawn Craig
Player of the match: Cameron White (Renegades)

- Sydney Thunder won the toss and elected to bat.

16 January
18:10 (D/N)
Scorecard

| Sydney Thunder; 5/202 (20 overs) | v | Sydney Sixers (H); 156 (17.3 overs) |
| Shane Watson 66 (41); Sean Abbott 2/41 (4 overs) | | Nic Maddinson 70 (40); Clint McKay 3/16 (2.3 overs) |

Sydney Thunder won by 46 runs
Sydney Cricket Ground
Attendance: 38,456
Umpires: Gerard Abood and John Ward
Player of the match: Shane Watson (Thunder)

- Sydney Sixers won the toss and elected to field.
- Nathan McAndrew (Thunder) made his T20 debut.
- The crowd of 38,456 is the highest crowd for a domestic cricket game in New South Wales.

== Knockout phase ==
Semifinals
1 | Adelaide Strikers (H) | 7/159 (20 ov)
4 | Sydney Thunder | 2/160 (17.4 ov)
3 | Perth Scorchers | 7/139 (20 ov)
2 | Melbourne Stars (H) | 3/140 (18.1 ov)

Final
2 | Melbourne Stars (H) | 9/176 (20 ov)
4 | Sydney Thunder | 7/181 (19.3 ov)

=== Semi-finals ===
The top four teams from the group stage qualified for the semi-finals.

21 January
19:10 (D/N)
Scorecard

| (H) Adelaide Strikers; 7/159 (20 overs) | v | Sydney Thunder; 2/160 (17.4 overs) |
| Alex Ross 47 (38); Clint McKay 3/44 (4 overs) | | Usman Khawaja 104* (59); Ben Laughlin 1//21 (3 overs) |

Sydney Thunder won by 8 wickets
Adelaide Oval
Attendance: 48,699
Umpires: Gerard Abood and Simon Fry
Player of the match: Usman Khawaja (Thunder)

- Adelaide Strikers won the toss and elected to bat.

=== Final ===
Final
24 January
19:20 (D/N)
Scorecard

| (H) Melbourne Stars; 9/176 (20 overs) | v | Sydney Thunder; 7/181 (19.3 overs) |
| Kevin Pietersen 74 (39); Shane Watson 2/17 (3 overs) | | Usman Khawaja 70 (40); Marcus Stoinis 3/30 (4 overs) |

Sydney Thunder won by 3 wickets
Melbourne Cricket Ground
Attendance: 47,672
Umpires: Simon Fry and Sam Nogajski
Player of the match: Usman Khawaja (Thunder)

- Sydney Thunder won the toss and elected to field.

== 2015/16 squad ==
Players with international caps are listed in bold.

| Name | Nat | Birth date | Batting style | Bowling style | Notes |
Batsmen
| **Michael Hussey** | (Australia) | 27 May 1975 (age 50) | Left-handed | Right arm medium | Captain |
| **Usman Khawaja** | (Australia) | 18 December 1986 (age 39) | Left-handed | Right arm medium | |
| Aiden Blizzard | (Australia) | 27 June 1984 (age 41) | Left-handed | Left arm medium | |
| Kurtis Patterson | (Australia) | 5 April 1993 (age 33) | Left-handed | Right arm off spin | |
| **Ben Rohrer** | (Australia) | 26 March 1981 (age 45) | Left-handed | | |
| Ahillen Beadle | (Australia) | 29 August 1986 (age 39) | Left-handed | Left arm orthodox | |
| Jake Doran | (Australia) | 2 December 1996 (age 29) | Left-handed | Right arm medium | |
All-rounders
| **Jacques Kallis** | (South Africa) | 16 October 1975 (age 50) | Right-handed | Right arm fast | Overseas player |
| **Andre Russell** | (Jamaica) | 29 April 1988 (age 37) | Right-handed | Right arm fast medium | Overseas player |
| **Andrew McDonald** | (Australia) | 15 June 1981 (age 44) | Right-handed | Right-arm fast-medium | |
| **Shane Watson** | (Australia) | 17 June 1981 (age 44) | Right-handed | Right-arm fast-medium | |
Wicket-keepers
| Chris Hartley | (Australia) | 24 May 1982 (age 43) | Left-handed | — | |
Bowlers
| **Pat Cummins** | (Australia) | 8 May 1993 (age 32) | Right-handed | Right arm fast | |
| **Clint McKay** | (Australia) | 22 February 1983 (age 43) | Right-handed | Right arm fast medium | |
| **Gurinder Sandhu** | (Australia) | 14 February 1993 (age 33) | Left-handed | Right arm fast medium | |
| Alister McDermott | (Australia) | 7 June 1991 (age 34) | Right-handed | Right arm fast medium | |
| Chris Green | (Australia) | 1 October 1993 (age 32) | Right-handed | Right arm off spin | |
| **Fawad Ahmed** | (Australia) | 5 February 1982 (age 44) | Right-handed | Right arm leg spin | |

=== Home attendance ===
| Game | Opponent | Attendance |
|---|---|---|
| 2 | Sydney Sixers | 18,287 |
| 3 | Adelaide Strikers | 21,500 |
| 6 | Perth Scorchers | 18,942 |
| 8 | Melbourne Renegades | 18,602 |
| **Total Attendance** | | **77,331** |
| Average Attendance | | 19,333 |
