= 2021–22 Sydney Thunder season =

Big Bash Cricket season

Sydney Thunder
2021–22 season
- Coach: Trevor Bayliss
- Captain(s): Usman Khawaja; Chris Green
- Home ground: Sydney Showground Stadium
- League: BBL
- Record: 3rd
- Finals: Knockout (4th)
- Leading Run Scorer: Jason Sangha (445)
- Leading Wicket Taker: Daniel Sams (19)

The 2021–22 Sydney Thunder season was the eleventh in the team's history. Coached by Trevor Bayliss, the Thunder entered BBL|11 placing in fourth in BBL|10.

== Standings ==
Pos	Team	Pld	W	L	NR	BP	Pts	NRR	Qualification
1	Perth Scorchers (C)	14	11	3	0	7	40	0.926	Advanced to play-off phase
2	Sydney Sixers	14	9	4	1	6	35	1.027	Advanced to play-off phase
3	Sydney Thunder	14	9	5	0	8	35	0.725	Advanced to play-off phase
4	Adelaide Strikers	14	6	8	0	10	28	0.237	Advanced to play-off phase
5	Hobart Hurricanes	14	7	7	0	6	27	−0.332	Advanced to play-off phase
6	Melbourne Stars	14	7	7	0	5	26	−0.222	
7	Brisbane Heat	14	3	11	0	7	16	−0.910	
8	Melbourne Renegades	14	3	10	1	5	16	−1.477	

Source: ESPNcricinfo
(C) Champions

== Regular season ==
Match 2
6 December 2021
19:15 (N)
Scorecard

Brisbane Heat; 8/140 (20 overs)	v	Sydney Thunder (H); 3/141 (17.1 overs)
Ben Duckett 46 (35); Daniel Sams 3/22 (4 overs)		Alex Ross 61* (46); Liam Guthrie 2/32 (3 overs)

Sydney Thunder won by 7 wickets
Manuka Oval, Canberra
Attendance: 6,824
Umpires: Greg Davidson and Tony Wilds
Player of the match: Alex Ross (Sydney Thunder)

- Sydney Thunder won the toss and elected to field.
- Liam Guthrie (Brisbane Heat) made his T20 debut.

Match 7
10 December 2021
19:15 (N)
Scorecard

(H) Melbourne Stars; 4/165 (20 overs)	v	Sydney Thunder; 5/161 (20 overs)
Nick Larkin 52* (43); Tanveer Sangha 2/29 (4 overs)		Matthew Gilkes 56 (49); Nathan Coulter-Nile 2/27 (4 overs)

Melbourne Stars won by 4 runs
Melbourne Cricket Ground, Melbourne
Attendance: 10,888
Umpires: Darren Close and Greg Davidson
Player of the match: Nick Larkin (Melbourne Stars)

- Sydney Thunder won the toss and elected to field.

Match 10
12 December 2021
19:15 (N)
Scorecard

(H) Sydney Thunder; 5/151 (20 overs)	v	Melbourne Stars; 4/155 (17.1 overs)
Alex Ross 77* (49); Qais Ahmad 2/17 (4 overs)		Andre Russell 42* (21); Tanveer Sangha 2/20 (4 overs)

Melbourne Stars won by 6 wickets
Sydney Showground Stadium, Sydney
Attendance: 4,314
Umpires: Gerard Abood and Ben Treloar
Player of the match: Andre Russell (Melbourne Stars)

- Melbourne Stars won the toss and elected to field.

Match 14
19 December 2021
18:40 (N)
Scorecard

Sydney Thunder; 7/196 (20 overs)	v	Brisbane Heat (H); 143 (17.3 overs)
Sam Billings 64 (27); Mitchell Swepson 2/27 (4 overs)		Xavier Bartlett 42* (29); Saqib Mahmood 4/22 (3 overs)

Sydney Thunder won by 53 runs
The Gabba, Brisbane
Attendance: 16,189
Umpires: Darren Close and Donovan Koch
Player of the match: Saqib Mahmood (Sydney Thunder)

- Brisbane won the toss and elected to field.
- X-factor subs: Tom Cooper (Brisbane Heat) replaced Tom Abell.

Match 20
26 December 2021
18:05 (D/N)
Scorecard

Sydney Sixers; 4/168 (16 overs)	v	Sydney Thunder (H); 142 (15.1 overs)
Daniel Hughes 50 (26); Daniel Sams 2/29 (3 overs)		Jason Sangha 47 (30); Hayden Kerr 3/29 (3 overs)

Sydney Sixers won by 30 runs (DLS method)
Sydney Showground Stadium, Sydney
Attendance: 10,061
Umpires: Greg Davidson and Bruce Oxenford
Player of the match: Dan Christian (Sydney Sixers)

- Sydney Thunder won the toss and elected to field.
- Rain stopped play during Sydney Sixers innings. Sydney Thunder were set a revised target of 173 runs from 16 overs.
- Todd Murphy (Sydney Sixers) made his T20 debut.
- X-factor subs: Mickey Edwards (Sydney Sixers) replaced Todd Murphy.

Match 24
28 December 2021
19:15 (N)
Scorecard

(H) Sydney Thunder; 7/200 (20 overs)	v	Perth Scorchers; 8/166 (20 overs)
Sam Billings 67 (35); Matthew Kelly 3/30 (4 overs)		Colin Munro 64* (43); Nathan McAndrew 3/40 (4 overs)

Sydney Thunder won by 34 runs
Manuka Oval, Canberra
Attendance: 9,740
Umpires: Donovan Koch and David Taylor
Player of the match: Sam Billings (Sydney Thunder)

- Perth Scorchers won the toss and elected to field.
- X-factor subs: Lance Morris (Perth Scorchers) replaced Peter Hatzoglou.

Match 28
31 December 2021
18:45 (N)
Scorecard

Sydney Thunder; 3/187 (20 overs)	v	Adelaide Strikers (H); 7/165 (20 overs)
Jason Sangha 91* (55); Fawad Ahmed 1/22 (4 overs)		Jonathan Wells 46 (26); Daniel Sams 4/33 (4 overs)

Sydney Thunder won by 22 runs
Adelaide Oval, Adelaide
Attendance: 9,555
Umpires: Darren Close and Greg Davidson
Player of the match: Jason Sangha (Sydney Thunder)

- Sydney Thunder won the toss and elected to bat.

Match 32
2 January 2022
19:15 (N)
Scorecard

(H) Sydney Thunder; 7/172 (20 overs)	v	Adelaide Strikers; 144 (19.1 overs)
Matthew Gilkes 93 (57); Wes Agar 3/26 (4 overs)		Harry Nielsen 39 (31); Mohammad Hasnain 3/20 (4 overs)

Sydney Thunder won by 28 runs
Sydney Showground Stadium, Sydney
Umpires: Gerard Abood and Simon Lightbody
Player of the match: Matthew Gilkes (Sydney Thunder)

- Sydney Thunder won the toss and elected to bat.
- Henry Hunt (Adelaide Strikers) made his T20 debut.

Match 38
6 January 2022
20:15 (N)
Scorecard

(H) Perth Scorchers; 9/133 (18 overs)	v	Sydney Thunder; 4/137 (17 overs)
Cameron Bancroft 30 (31); Gurinder Sandhu 4/22 (4 overs)		Jason Sangha 34 (26); Andrew Tye 2/38 (4 overs)

Sydney Thunder won by 6 wickets (DLS method)
Metricon Stadium, Gold Coast
Umpires: Gerard Abood and Troy Penman
Player of the match: Gurinder Sandhu (Sydney Thunder)

- Perth Scorchers won the toss and elected to bat.
- Rain stopped play during Perth Scorchers innings. Sydney Thunder were set a revised target of 135 runs from 18 overs due to rain.
- Gurinder Sandhu became the first player to take a hat-trick for the Sydney Thunder.

Match 40
8 January 2022
18:05 (N)
Scorecard

Sydney Thunder; 7/209 (20 overs)	v	Melbourne Renegades (H); 80 (14.2 overs)
Daniel Sams 98* (44); Kane Richardson 2/39 (4 overs)		James Seymour 25 (23); Mohammad Hasnain 3/22 (3.2 overs)

Sydney Thunder won by 129 runs
Marvel Stadium, Melbourne
Attendance: 4,351
Umpires: Bruce Oxenford and Ben Treloar
Player of the match: Daniel Sams (Sydney Thunder)

- Melbourne Renegades won the toss and elected to field.

Match 43
10 January 2022
14:10
Scorecard

(H) Hobart Hurricanes; 6/139 (20 overs)	v	Sydney Thunder; 1/140 (17.2 overs)
Ben McDermott 38 (34); Nathan McAndrew 2/31 (4 overs)		Alex Hales 80* (56); D'Arcy Short 1/9 (3 overs)

Sydney Thunder won by 9 wickets
Melbourne Cricket Ground, Melbourne
Attendance: 5,802
Umpires: Gerard Abood and David Taylor
Player of the match: Alex Hales (Sydney Thunder)

- Hobart Hurricanes won the toss and elected to bat.

Match 47
13 January 2022
15:45 (D/N)
Scorecard

Hobart Hurricanes; 6/177 (20 overs)	v	Sydney Thunder (H); 9/168 (20 overs)
Matthew Wade 83* (54); Gurinder Sandhu 2/27 (3 overs)		Alex Hales 38 (17); Jordan Thompson 3/24 (3 overs)

Hobart Hurricanes won by 9 runs
Marvel Stadium, Melbourne
Attendance: 10,014
Umpires: Sam Nogajski and Troy Penman
Player of the match: Riley Meredith (Hobart Hurricanes)

- Hobart Hurricanes won the toss and elected to bat.
- X-factor subs: Mitchell Owen (Hobart Hurricanes) replaced Wil Parker.

Match 50
15 January 2022
18:40 (N)
Scorecard

(H) Sydney Sixers; 5/197 (20 overs)	v	Sydney Thunder; 9/137 (20 overs)
Daniel Hughes 66 (48); Nathan McAndrew 2/30 (3 overs)		Chris Green 50 (31); Steve O'Keefe 4/18 (4 overs)

Sydney Sixers won by 60 runs
Sydney Cricket Ground, Sydney
Attendance: 20,306
Umpires: Gerard Abood and Phillip Gillespie
Player of the match: Steve O'Keefe (Sydney Sixers)

- Sydney Thunder won the toss and elected to field.

Match 55
19 January 2022
16:10 (D/N)
Scorecard

(H) Sydney Thunder; 8/170 (20 overs)	v	Melbourne Renegades; 7/169 (20 overs)
Usman Khawaja 77 (51); Cameron Boyce 5/21 (4 overs)		Aaron Finch 82 (64); Gurinder Sandhu 3/33 (4 overs)

Sydney Thunder won by 1 run
Melbourne Cricket Ground, Melbourne
Umpires: Simon Lightbody and Tony Wilds
Player of the match: Cameron Boyce (Melbourne Renegades)

- Melbourne Renegades won the toss and elected to field.
- Cameron Boyce (Melbourne Renegades) became the first bowler to take four wickets in four consecutive deliveries in the BBL.

== Playoffs ==
Knockout
23 January 2022
19:15 (N)
Scorecard

Adelaide Strikers; 6/184 (20 overs)	v	Sydney Thunder (H); 6/178 (20 overs)
Ian Cockbain 65 (38); Tanveer Sangha 2/15 (4 overs)		Jason Sangha 61 (43); Harry Conway 2/33 (4 overs)

Adelaide Strikers won by 6 runs
Melbourne Cricket Ground, Melbourne
Umpires: Phillip Gillespie and Donovan Koch
Player of the match: Ian Cockbain (Adelaide Strikers)

- Adelaide Strikers won the toss and elected to bat.

== Squad ==
Each 2021–22 squad was made up of 18 active players. Teams could sign up to five overseas players, with a maximum of three of those being able to play in each match.

Personnel changes made ahead of the season included:

- English internationals Alex Hales and Sam Billings opted to re-sign with the Thunder for the season.
- New Zealand international Adam Milne opted not to re-sign.
- English international Saqib Mahmood signed with the Thunder, but was not available for the start of the tournament due to scheduling
- Callum Ferguson departed the Thunder, with no contract being offered.

The squad for the 2021–22 Big Bash League season.

- Players with international caps are listed in **bold**.
- Ages are given as of the first match of the tournament, 5 December 2021

No.	Name	Nationality	Date of birth (age)	Batting style	Bowling style	Notes
Batters
18	**Usman Khawaja**	Australia	18 December 1986 (aged 34)	Left-handed	Right-arm off-break	Captain
6	**Alex Hales**	England	5 January 1989 (aged 32)	Right-handed	Right arm medium	
9	Oliver Davies	Australia	15 October 2000 (aged 21)	Right-handed	Right-arm off break	
49	Alex Ross	Australia	17 April 1992 (aged 29)	Right-handed	Right-arm off-break	
32	Jason Sangha	Australia	8 September 1999 (aged 22)	Right-handed	Right arm leg spin	
All-rounders
93	Chris Green	Australia	1 October 1993 (aged 28)	Right-handed	Right arm off-break	Vice captain
44	Nathan McAndrew	Australia	14 July 1993 (aged 28)	Right-handed	Right-arm fast medium	
95	**Daniel Sams**	Australia	27 October 1992 (aged 29)	Right-handed	Left-arm fast medium	
31	**Ben Cutting**	Australia	30 January 1987 (aged 34)	Right-handed	Right-arm fast medium	
Wicket-keepers
7	**Sam Billings**	England	15 June 1991 (aged 30)	Right-Handed	Right-arm medium	Visa contract
22	Matt Gilkes	Australia	21 August 1999 (aged 22)	Left-Handed	Left-arm medium	
16	Baxter Holt	Australia	21 October 1999 (aged 22)	Right-handed	Right-arm medium	
3	Sam Whiteman	Australia	19 March 1992 (aged 29)	Left-handed	Left-arm medium	Replacement player
Bowlers
11	**Saqib Mahmood**	England	25 February 1997 (aged 24)	Right-handed	Right-arm fast	Visa contract
35	Brendan Doggett	Australia	3 May 1994 (aged 27)	Right-handed	Right-arm fast medium	
20	**Chris Tremain**	Australia	10 August 1991 (aged 30)	Right-handed	Right-arm fast medium	
50	Jono Cook	Australia	14 December 1989 (aged 31)	Right-handed	Right arm leg spin	
28	**Gurinder Sandhu**	Australia	14 June 1993 (aged 28)	Right-handed	Right arm fast medium	
17	Tanveer Sangha	Australia	26 November 2001 (aged 20)	Right-handed	Right arm leg spin	
