= 2013–14 Big Bash League season =

Cricket tournament

2013–14 Big Bash League
- Dates: 20 December 2013 – 7 February 2014
- Administrator: Cricket Australia
- Cricket format: Twenty20
- Tournament format(s): Group stage and knockout
- Champions: Perth Scorchers (1st title)
- Participants: 8
- Matches: 35
- Attendance: 657,227 (18,778 per match)
- Player of the series: Ben Dunk (Hobart Hurricanes)
- Most runs: Ben Dunk (395), (Hobart Hurricanes)
- Most wickets: Cameron Gannon (18), (Brisbane Heat)
- Official website: bigbash.com.au

The 2013–14 Big Bash League season or BBL|03 was the third season of the Big Bash League, the premier Twenty20 cricket competition in Australia. The tournament began on 20 December 2013 and ended on 7 February 2014. The format remained the same as the previous season but ran for a time-frame that is two weeks longer. The schedule also overlapped with the 2013–14 Ashes series. It was the first season to be broadcast on free-to-air television on Network Ten.

The tournament was won by Perth Scorchers and the final was hosted at the WACA Ground in Perth, Australia. The Scorchers beat the Hobart Hurricanes in the final by 39 runs. Ben Dunk from the Hurricanes was named the 'Man of the Tournament' while Jonathan Wells from the same team was named the 'Young Gun of the Tournament'.

== League stage ==
=== Points table ===
Pos	Team	Pld	W	L	NR	Pts	NRR	Qualification
1	Melbourne Stars	8	8	0	0	16	2.189	Advanced to semi-finals
2	Sydney Sixers	8	6	2	0	12	−0.218	Advanced to semi-finals
3	Perth Scorchers (C)	8	5	3	0	10	−0.064	Advanced to semi-finals
4	Hobart Hurricanes	8	3	4	1	7	0.321	Advanced to semi-finals
5	Brisbane Heat	8	3	5	0	6	−0.197	
6	Melbourne Renegades	8	3	5	0	6	−0.475	
7	Adelaide Strikers	8	2	5	1	5	−0.933	
8	Sydney Thunder	8	1	7	0	2	−0.654	

(C) Champions

=== Match Summary ===
Visitor team →	ADS	BRH	HBH	MLR	MLS	PRS	SYS	SYT
Home team ↓	ADS	BRH	HBH	MLR	MLS	PRS	SYS	SYT
Adelaide Strikers		Heat; 32 runs		Renegades; 1 run		Strikers; 6 wickets	Sixers; 6 wickets	
Brisbane Heat			Hurricanes; 3 wickets		Stars; 3 wickets	Heat; 3 wickets	Sixers; 4 runs	
Hobart Hurricanes	Match abandoned	Hurricanes; 40 runs		Renegades; 51 runs				Hurricanes; 73 runs
Melbourne Renegades		Renegades; 57 runs			Stars; 9 wickets		Sixers; 2 runs	Thunder; 9 wickets
Melbourne Stars	Stars; 8 wickets		Stars; 5 wickets	Stars; 76 runs		Stars; 20 runs		
Perth Scorchers	Scorchers; 5 runs		Scorchers; 6 runs	Scorchers; 6 runs				Scorchers; 6 wickets
Sydney Sixers			Sixers; 7 runs		Stars; 77 runs	Scorchers; Super Over		Sixers; 6 wickets
Sydney Thunder	Strikers; 6 runs	Heat; 48 runs			Stars; 7 wickets		Sixers; 8 wickets	

Home team won	Visitor team won

- Note: Results listed are according to the home (horizontal) and visitor (vertical) teams.
- Note: Click on a result to see a summary of the match.

=== Matches ===
Times shown are in Australian Western Standard Time (UTC+08:00) for Perth, Australian Central Daylight Time (UTC+10:30) for Adelaide, Australian Eastern Standard Time (UTC+10:00) for Brisbane and Australian Eastern Daylight Time (UTC+11:00) for all other venues.

20 December
19:40 (D/N)
Scorecard

(H) Melbourne Stars; 7/208 (20 overs)	v	Melbourne Renegades; 132 (17.3 overs)
Luke Wright 70 (32); Nathan Rimmington 2/34 (4 overs)		Jos Buttler 49 (28); Jackson Bird 4/31 (4 overs)

Melbourne Stars won by 76 runs
Melbourne Cricket Ground
Attendance: 25,266
Umpires: Simon Fry and John Ward
Player of the match: Luke Wright (Stars)

- Melbourne Renegades won the toss and elected to field.

21 December
19:10 (D/N)
Scorecard

Sydney Thunder; 6/166 (20 overs)	v	Sydney Sixers (H); 4/167 (18.2 overs)
Usman Khawaja 66 (51); Moisés Henriques 2/24 (4 overs)		Nic Maddinson 61 (40); Carl Sandri 1/20 (2 overs)

Sydney Sixers won by 6 wickets
Sydney Cricket Ground
Attendance: 18,180
Umpires: Gerard Abood and Ashley Barrow
Player of the match: Nic Maddinson (Sixers)

- Sydney Sixers won the toss and elected to field.

22 December
13:50
Scorecard

Adelaide Strikers; 1/87 (6 overs)	v	Hobart Hurricanes (H)
Alex Hales 49 (19)

No result
Bellerive Oval, Hobart
Attendance: 5,681
Umpires: Mick Martell and Sam Nogajski

- Hobart Hurricanes won the toss and elected to field.

22 December
18:10 (D/N)
Scorecard

Perth Scorchers; 7/151 (20 overs)	v	Brisbane Heat (H); 7/152 (19.4 overs)
Mitchell Marsh 57* (35); Ben Cutting 3/31 (4 overs)		Chris Lynn 81 (53); Brad Hogg 3/21 (4 overs)

Brisbane Heat won by 3 wickets
The Gabba, Woolloongabba, Brisbane
Attendance: 19,264
Umpires: Ian Lock and Damien Mealey
Player of the match: Chris Lynn (Heat)

- Perth Scorchers won the toss and elected to bat.

26 December
16:40 (D/N)
Scorecard

(H) Perth Scorchers; 7/117 (20 overs)	v	Melbourne Renegades; 8/111 (20 overs)
Shaun Marsh 31 (34); Nathan Rimmington 2/14 (4 overs)		Alex Doolan 21 (15); Yasir Arafat 3/15 (4 overs)

Perth Scorchers won by 6 runs
WACA Ground, Perth
Attendance: 15,953
Umpires: Mick Martell and Paul Wilson
Player of the match: Yasir Arafat (Scorchers)

- Perth Scorchers won the toss and elected to bat.

27 December
19:40 (D/N)
Scorecard

Adelaide Strikers; 6/153 (20 overs)	v	Sydney Thunder (H); 6/147 (20 overs)
Michael Klinger 44 (34); Dirk Nannes 2/22 (4 overs)		Michael Hussey 85 (56); Michael Neser 3/24 (4 overs)

Adelaide Strikers won by 6 runs
ANZ Stadium, Sydney
Attendance: 11,068
Umpires: Simon Fry and Michael Graham-Smith
Player of the match: Michael Hussey (Thunder)

- Sydney Thunder won the toss and elected to field.

28 December
18:10 (D/N)
Scorecard

(H) Brisbane Heat; 3/209 (20 overs)	v	Hobart Hurricanes; 7/210 (19.2 overs)
Daniel Christian 70* (40); Doug Bollinger 1/27 (3 overs)		Ben Dunk 67 (33); Daniel Vettori 2/32 (4 overs)

Hobart Hurricanes won by 3 wickets
The Gabba, Woolloongabba, Brisbane
Attendance: 20,457
Umpires: Gerard Abood and Damien Mealey
Player of the match: Ben Dunk (Hurricanes)

- Brisbane Heat won the toss and elected to bat.

29 December
19:10 (D/N)
Scorecard

Melbourne Stars; 5/200 (20 overs)	v	Sydney Sixers (H); 9/123 (20 overs)
David Hussey 50* (41); Josh Hazlewood 3/20 (4 overs)		Michael Lumb 29 (19); Glenn Maxwell 3/26 (4 overs)

Melbourne Stars won by 77 runs
Sydney Cricket Ground, Sydney
Attendance: 20,368
Umpires: Ashley Barrow and Michael Graham-Smith
Player of the match: Glenn Maxwell (Stars)

- Sydney Sixers won the toss and elected to field.

30 December
19:40 (D/N)
Scorecard

(H) Melbourne Renegades; 3/210 (20 overs)	v	Brisbane Heat; 153 (19.2 overs)
Aaron Finch 81 (51); Dan Christian 2/43 (4 overs)		Ben Cutting 40 (19); James Pattinson 3/36 (4 overs)

Melbourne Renegades won by 57 runs
Etihad Stadium, Melbourne
Attendance: 19,832
Umpires: Geoff Joshua and Sam Nogajski
Player of the match: Aaron Finch (Renegades)

- Melbourne Renegades won the toss and elected to bat.

31 December
20:10
Scorecard

Perth Scorchers; 9/159 (20 overs)	v	Adelaide Strikers (H); 4/164 (19 overs)
Nathan Coulter-Nile 42* (25); Michael Neser 3/27 (4 overs)		Michael Klinger 86* (55); Nathan Coulter-Nile 2/28 (4 overs)

Adelaide Strikers won by 6 wickets
Adelaide Oval, Adelaide
Attendance: 26,030
Umpires: Simon Fry and Paul Wilson
Player of the match: Michael Klinger (Strikers)

- Perth Scorchers won the toss and elected to bat.

1 January
13:50
Scorecard

Melbourne Renegades; 8/162 (20 overs)	v	Hobart Hurricanes (H); 111 (17.1 overs)
Aaron Finch 50 (31); Ben Laughlin 3/16 (4 overs)		Tim Paine 31 (28); James Pattinson 4/24 (4 overs)

Melbourne Renegades won by 51 runs
Bellerive Oval, Hobart
Attendance: 10,924
Umpires: Geoff Joshua and Ian Lock
Player of the match: James Pattinson (Renegades)

- Melbourne Renegades won the toss and elected to bat.

1 January
19:40 (D/N)
Scorecard

(H) Sydney Thunder; 6/155 (20 overs)	v	Melbourne Stars; 3/156 (19.1 overs)
Michael Hussey 66 (48); John Hastings 3/31 (4 overs)		Brad Hodge 64* (36); Dirk Nannes 1/15 (4 overs)

Melbourne Stars won by 7 wickets
ANZ Stadium, Sydney
Attendance: 10,902
Umpires: Gerard Abood and Michael Graham-Smith
Player of the match: Brad Hodge (Stars)

- Sydney Thunder won the toss and elected to bat.

2 January
18:40 (D/N)
Scorecard

Sydney Sixers; 8/140 (20 overs)	v	Brisbane Heat (H); 7/136 (20 overs)
Michael Lumb 56 (42); Cameron Gannon 4/24 (4 overs)		Craig Kieswetter 38 (40); Brett Lee 2/22 (4 overs)

Sydney Sixers won by 4 runs
The Gabba, Woolloongabba, Brisbane
Attendance: 22,324
Umpires: Ashley Barrow and John Ward
Player of the match: Brett Lee (Sixers)

- Brisbane Heat won the toss and elected to field.
- Mark Steketee made his T20 debut for Brisbane Heat.

3 January
16:40 (D/N)
Scorecard

Sydney Thunder; 6/157 (20 overs)	v	Perth Scorchers (H); 4/161 (19.2 overs)
Eoin Morgan 48 (30); Brad Hogg 2/20 (4 overs)		Simon Katich 75 (42); Gurinder Sandhu 1/26 (4 overs)

Perth Scorchers won by 6 wickets
WACA Ground, Perth
Attendance: 18,718
Umpires: Geoff Joshua and Damien Mealey
Player of the match: Simon Katich (Scorchers)

- Sydney Thunder won the toss and elected to bat.

4 January
19:10 (D/N)
Scorecard

(H) Melbourne Renegades; 5/163 (20 overs)	v	Melbourne Stars; 1/167 (16.2 overs)
Aaron Finch 84* (55); Jackson Bird 3/24 (4 overs)		Cameron White 84* (49); Aaron O'Brien 1/38 (3 overs)

Melbourne Stars won by 9 wickets
Etihad Stadium, Melbourne
Attendance: 42,837
Umpires: Ashley Barrow and Tony Ward
Player of the match: Cameron White (Stars)

- Melbourne Renegades won the toss and elected to bat.

5 January
19:40 (D/N)
Scorecard

(H) Adelaide Strikers; 7/149 (20 overs)	v	Sydney Sixers; 4/150 (19.1 overs)
Shakib Al Hasan 46 (30); Josh Hazlewood 3/16 (4 overs)		Michael Lumb 54 (41); Shakib Al Hasan 2/21 (4 overs)

Sydney Sixers won by 6 wickets
Adelaide Oval, Adelaide
Attendance: 26,506
Umpires: Simon Fry and Sam Nogajski
Player of the match: Michael Lumb (Sixers)

- Adelaide Strikers won the toss and elected to bat.

7 January
16:40 (D/N)
Scorecard

(H) Perth Scorchers; 7/153 (20 overs)	v	Hobart Hurricanes; 7/147 (20 overs)
Shaun Marsh 40 (32); Doug Bollinger 1/23 (4 overs)		Owais Shah 32 (26); Nathan Coulter-Nile 3/15 (4 overs)

Perth Scorchers won by 6 runs
WACA Ground, Perth
Attendance: 15,355
Umpires: Ian Lock and John Ward
Player of the match: Nathan Coulter-Nile (Scorchers)

- Perth Scorchers won the toss and elected to bat.

8 January
19:40 (D/N)
Scorecard

Brisbane Heat; 5/165 (20 overs)	v	Sydney Thunder (H); 117 (17.2 overs)
Chris Lynn 56 (35); Dirk Nannes 3/21 (4 overs)		Michael Hussey 60 (37); Cameron Gannon 4/10 (2.2 overs)

Brisbane Heat won by 48 runs
ANZ Stadium, Sydney
Attendance: 11,767
Umpires: Simon Fry and Tony Ward
Player of the match: Chris Lynn (Heat)

- Brisbane Heat won the toss and elected to bat.

9 January
19:40 (D/N)
Scorecard

Adelaide Strikers; 9/90 (20 overs)	v	Melbourne Stars (H); 2/91 (7.3 overs)
Michael Klinger 42 (49); James Faulkner 3/9 (4 overs)		Luke Wright 49 (20); Michael Neser 2/21 (1.3 overs)

Melbourne Stars won by 8 wickets
Melbourne Cricket Ground
Attendance: 24,344
Umpires: Michael Graham-Smith and Geoff Joshua
Player of the match: James Faulkner (Stars)

- Adelaide Strikers won the toss and elected to bat.

10 January
19:40 (D/N)
Scorecard

Perth Scorchers; 5/153 (20 overs)	v	Sydney Sixers (H); 9/153 (20 overs)
Simon Katich 71 (56); Brett Lee 4/28 (4 overs)		Steve Smith 65 (48); Yasir Arafat 4/24 (4 overs)

Scores level; Perth Scorchers won the Super Over
Sydney Cricket Ground
Attendance: 23,843
Umpires: Gerard Abood and Simon Fry
Player of the match: Yasir Arafat (Scorchers)

- Perth Scorchers won the toss and elected to bat.

11 January
13:50
Scorecard

(H) Hobart Hurricanes; 5/167 (20 overs)	v	Sydney Thunder; 94 (16.4 overs)
Ben Dunk 96 (54); Gurinder Sandhu 3/34 (4 overs)		Usman Khawaja 28 (30); Ben Laughlin 3/8 (3 overs)

Hobart Hurricanes won by 73 runs
Bellerive Oval, Hobart
Attendance: 10,738
Umpires: Damien Mealy and Sam Nogajski
Player of the match: Ben Dunk (Hurricanes)

- Hobart Hurricanes won the toss and elected to bat

11 January
18:10 (D/N)
Scorecard

(H) Brisbane Heat; 7/144 (20 overs)	v	Melbourne Stars; 7/149 (19.4 overs)
Daniel Christian 68 (48); Lasith Malinga 2/21 (4 overs)		Luke Wright 37 (33); James Hopes 3/23 (4 overs)

Melbourne Stars won by 3 wickets
The Gabba, Woolloongabba, Brisbane
Attendance: 32,696
Umpires: Ashley Barrow and Paul Wilson
Player of the match: Luke Wright (Stars)

- Brisbane Heat won the toss and elected to bat

14 January
19:40 (D/N)
Scorecard

(H) Melbourne Renegades; 104 (18.3 overs)	v	Sydney Thunder; 1/105 (11.3 overs)
Daniel Harris 30 (31); Gurinder Sandhu 3/21 (4 overs)		Usman Khawaja 46* (34); James Pattinson 1/30 (3.3 overs)

Sydney Thunder won by 9 wickets
Etihad Stadium, Melbourne
Attendance: 10,896
Umpires: Geoff Joshua and Tony Ward
Player of the match: Gurinder Sandhu (Thunder)

- Melbourne Renegades won the toss and elected to bat

15 January
19:40 (D/N)
Scorecard

(H) Sydney Sixers; 6/179 (20 overs)	v	Hobart Hurricanes; 8/172 (20 overs)
Steve Smith 52 (32); Ben Hilfenhaus 2/25 (4 overs)		Tim Paine 57 (30); Josh Hazlewood 2/25 (3 overs)

Sydney Sixers won by 7 runs
Sydney Cricket Ground
Attendance: 17,264
Umpires: Michael Graham-Smith and Paul Wilson
Player of the match: Steve Smith

- Sydney Sixers won the toss and elected to bat

16 January
16:40 (D/N)
Scorecard

(H) Perth Scorchers; 7/203 (20 overs)	v	Adelaide Strikers; 6/198 (20 overs)
Craig Simmons 102 (41); Shaun Tait 3/41 (4 overs)		Phillip Hughes 58 (45); Ashton Turner 1/19 (2 overs)

Perth Scorchers won by 5 runs
WACA Ground, Perth
Attendance: 19,495
Umpires: Ashley Barrow and Ian Lock
Player of the match: Craig Simmons (Scorchers)

- Perth Scorchers won the toss and elected to bat

18 January
14:20
Scorecard

Brisbane Heat; 7/129 (20 overs)	v	Adelaide Strikers (H); 97 (18.2 overs)
Craig Kieswetter 51 (46); Johan Botha 2/11 (4 overs)		Nathan Reardon 33 (35); Cameron Gannon 3/11 (2 overs)

Brisbane Heat won by 32 runs
Adelaide Oval, Adelaide
Attendance: 20,533
Umpires: Sam Nogajski and Paul Wilson
Player of the match: Daniel Vettori (Heat)

- Brisbane Heat won the toss and elected to bat

18 January
19:40 (D/N)
Scorecard

Sydney Sixers; 6/151 (20 overs)	v	Melbourne Renegades (H); 5/149 (20 overs)
Moisés Henriques 55 (39); Nathan Rimmington 2/35 (4 overs)		Dwayne Bravo 38 (30); Josh Hazlewood 1/22 (4 overs)

Sydney Sixers won by 2 runs
Etihad Stadium, Melbourne
Attendance: 14,152
Umpires: Damien Mealey and Tony Ward
Player of the match: Moisés Henriques (Sixers)

- Melbourne Renegades won the toss and elected to field

21 January
19:40 (D/N)
Scorecard

Hobart Hurricanes; 9/131 (20 overs)	v	Melbourne Stars (H); 5/135 (19.1 overs)
Travis Birt 31 (23); Marcus Stoinis 2/12 (2 overs)		Luke Wright 52 (36); Ben Laughlin 2/28 (4 overs)

Melbourne Stars won by 5 wickets
Melbourne Cricket Ground
Attendance: 21,443
Umpires: Ian Lock and Sam Nogajski
Player of the match: Luke Wright (Stars)

- Melbourne Stars won the toss and elected to field.

22 January
20:10 (D/N)
Scorecard

Melbourne Renegades; 6/155 (20 overs)	v	Adelaide Strikers (H); 7/154 (20 overs)
Dwayne Bravo 47 (33); Jon Holland 2/19 (4 overs)		Michael Neser 35* (24); Peter Siddle 3/35 (4 overs)

Melbourne Renegades won by 1 run
Adelaide Oval, Adelaide
Attendance: 21,745
Umpires: Damien Mealey and Tony Ward
Player of the match: Dwayne Bravo (Renegades)

- Melbourne Renegades won the toss and elected to bat.

23 January
19:40 (D/N)
Scorecard

(H) Hobart Hurricanes; 7/209 (20 overs)	v	Brisbane Heat; 8/169 (20 overs)
Ben Dunk 87 (53); Cameron Gannon 3/42 (4 overs)		Luke Pomersbach 60 (32); Cameron Boyce 3/21 (4 overs)

Hobart Hurricanes won by 40 runs
Bellerive Oval, Hobart
Attendance: 10,863
Umpires: Gerard Abood and Ian Lock
Player of the match: Ben Dunk (Hurricanes)

- Hobart Hurricanes won the toss and elected to bat.

25 January
19:10 (D/N)
Scorecard

(H) Sydney Thunder; 6/128 (20 overs)	v	Sydney Sixers; 2/131 (19.2 overs)
Daniel Hughes 32 (33); Nathan Lyon 3/14 (4 overs)		Nic Maddinson 59* (56); Chris Tremain 1/14 (3 overs)

Sydney Sixers won by 8 wickets
ANZ Stadium, Sydney
Attendance: 25,726
Umpires: Ashley Barrow and Damien Mealey
Player of the match: Nathan Lyon (Sixers)

- Sydney Sixers won the toss and elected to field.

27 January
13:50
Scorecard

(H) Melbourne Stars; 6/161 (20 overs)	v	Perth Scorchers; 9/141 (20 overs)
Brad Hodge 61 (43); Michael Beer 2/27 (4 overs)		Simon Katich 30 (23); John Hastings 3/20 (4 overs)

Melbourne Stars won by 20 runs
Melbourne Cricket Ground
Attendance: 16,198
Umpires: Gerard Abood (Aus) and Geoff Joshua (Aus)
Player of the match: John Hastings (Stars)

- Melbourne Stars won the toss and elected to bat.

== Play-offs ==
Semifinals
1	Melbourne Stars (H)	8/141 (20 ovs)
4	Hobart Hurricanes	3/142 (18.1 ovs)
3	Perth Scorchers (D/L)	5/193 (20 ovs)
2	Sydney Sixers (H)	6/48 (5 ovs)

Final
3	Perth Scorchers (H)	4/191 (20 ovs)
4	Hobart Hurricanes	7/152 (20 ovs)

=== Semi-final 1 ===
Semi-final
4 February
19:45 (D/N)
Scorecard

(H) Melbourne Stars; 8/141 (20 overs)	v	Hobart Hurricanes; 3/142 (18.1 overs)
Brad Hodge 51 (35); Cameron Boyce 3/11 (3 overs)		Tim Paine 65 (52); John Hastings 1/26 (3.1 overs)

Hobart Hurricanes won by 7 wickets
Melbourne Cricket Ground
Attendance: 12,506
Umpires: Gerard Abood and Tony Ward
Player of the match: Cameron Boyce (Hurricanes)

- Melbourne Stars won the toss and elected to bat.

=== Semi-final 2 ===
Semi-final
5 February
19:45 (D/N)
Scorecard

Perth Scorchers; 5/193 (20 overs)	v	Sydney Sixers (H); 6/48 (5 overs)
Craig Simmons 112 (58); Mitchell Starc 2/37 (4 overs)		Nic Maddinson 36 (16); Jason Behrendorff 2/5 (1 over)

Perth Scorchers won by 5 runs (D/L)
Sydney Cricket Ground
Attendance: 12,570
Umpires: Mick Martell and Paul Wilson
Player of the match: Craig Simmons (Scorchers)

- Sydney Sixers won the toss and elected to field.
- Rain during the innings break reduced the Sixers' target to 54 runs from 5 overs according to the Duckworth–Lewis method.

=== Final ===
Final
7 February
16:45 (D/N)
Scorecard

(H) Perth Scorchers; 4/191 (20 overs)	v	Hobart Hurricanes; 7/152 (20 overs)
Shaun Marsh 63* (43); Evan Gulbis 1/14 (1 over)		George Bailey 58 (32); Brad Hogg 2/17 (4 overs)

Perth Scorchers won by 39 runs
WACA Ground, Perth
Attendance: 20,783
Umpires: Mick Martell and John Ward
Player of the match: Brad Hogg (Scorchers)

- Perth Scorchers won the toss and elected to bat.

== Statistics ==
- Most runs: Ben Dunk
- Most wickets: Cameron Gannon

=== Attendance and viewership ===
Match	Teams	Venue	Date	Attendance	Viewers
1	Stars v Renegades	MCG	20 December 2013	25,266	1.19 million
2	Sixers v Thunder	SCG	21 December 2013	18,180	1.11 million
3	Hurricanes v Strikers	Hobart	22 December 2013	5,681	414,587
4	Heat v Scorchers	Brisbane	22 December 2013	19,264	1.12 million
5	Scorchers v Renegades	Perth	26 December 2013	15,953	
6	Strikers v Thunder	ANZ	27 December 2013	11,068	
7	Heat v Hurricanes	Brisbane	28 December 2013	20,457	
8	Sixers v Stars	SCG	29 December 2013	20,368	1.21 million
9	Renegades v Heat	Docklands	30 December 2013	19,832	624,000
10	Strikers v Scorchers	Adelaide	31 December 2013	26,030	458,000
11	Hurricanes v Renegades	Hobart	1 January 2014	10,924	
12	Thunder v Stars	ANZ	1 January 2014	10,902	
13	Heat v Sixers	Brisbane	2 January 2014	22,324	
14	Scorchers v Thunder	Perth	3 January 2014	18,718	
15	Renegades v Stars	Docklands	4 January 2014	42,837	
16	Strikers v Sixers	Adelaide	5 January 2014	26,506	
17	Scorchers v Hurricanes	Perth	7 January 2014	15,355	
18	Thunder v Heat	ANZ	8 January 2014	11,767	
19	Stars v Strikers	MCG	9 January 2014	24,344	
20	Sixers v Scorchers	SCG	10 January 2014	23,843	952,000
21	Hurricanes v Thunder	Hobart	11 January 2014	10,738	
22	Heat v Stars	Brisbane	11 January 2014	32,696	
23	Renegades v Thunder	Docklands	14 January 2014	10,896	
24	Sixers v Hurricanes	SCG	15 January 2014	17,264	
25	Scorchers v Strikers	Perth	16 January 2014	19,495	
26	Strikers v Heat	Adelaide	18 January 2014	20,533	
27	Renegades v Sixers	Docklands	18 January 2014	14,152	
28	Stars v Hurricanes	MCG	21 January 2014	21,443	
29	Strikers v Renegades	Adelaide	22 January 2014	21,745	
30	Hurricanes v Heat	Hobart	23 January 2014	10,863	
31	Thunder v Sixers	ANZ	25 January 2014	25,726	
32	Stars v Scorchers	MCG	27 January 2014	16,198	
SF1	Stars v Hurricanes	MCG	4 February 2014	12,506	
SF2	Sixers v Scorchers	SCG	5 February 2014	12,570	
Final	Scorchers v Hurricanes	Perth	7 February 2014	20,783	1.5 million
Total				657,227	32.62 million
Average				18,778	932,000
