= Tim Armstrong (cricketer) =

Australian cricketer and businessman

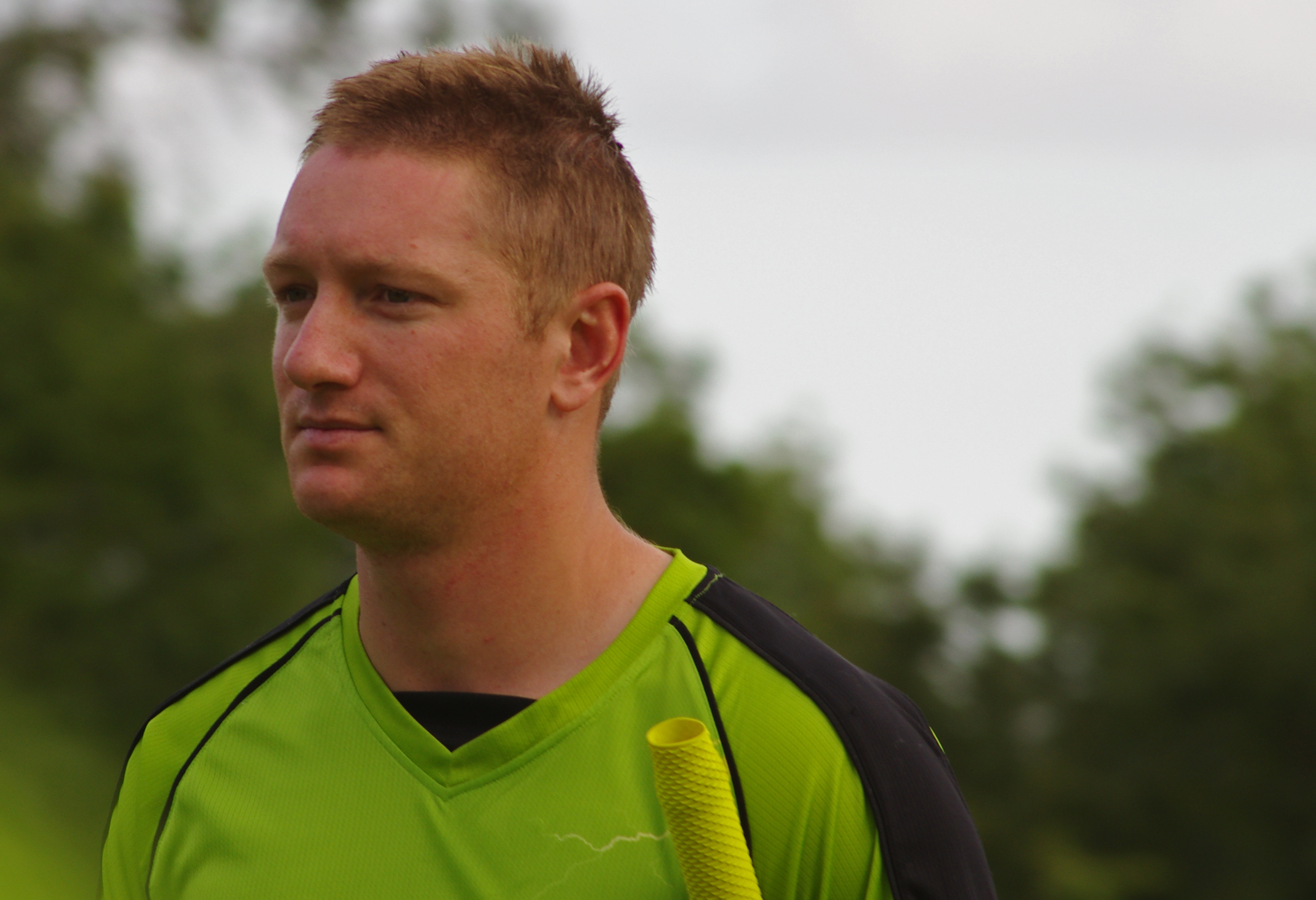
- Armstrong in 2011

Personal information
- Full name: Timothy John Armstrong
- Born: 26 September 1990 (age 36); Dubbo, New South Wales, Australia
- Batting: Right-handed
- Bowling: Right-arm Slow medium
- Role: All-rounder

Domestic team information
- Years: Team
- 2011: New South Wales
- 2012: Sydney Thunder
- 2012–present: Western Australia
- 2013–2014: Perth Scorchers

Career statistics
Competition	List A	T20
Matches	2	6
Runs scored	1	54
Batting average	0.50	13.50
100s/50s	0/0	0/0
Top score	1	25
Balls bowled	84	n/a
Wickets	1	n/a
Bowling average	53.00	n/a
5 wickets in innings	0	n/a
10 wickets in match	0	n/a
Best bowling	1/15	n/a
Catches/stumpings	1/-	2/-
- Source: CricketArchive, 9 February 2014

Timothy John Armstrong (born 26 September 1990) is a former Australian cricketer who was contracted to the Perth Scorchers in the Big Bash League, having previously played at Australian domestic level with New South Wales, the Sydney Thunder, and Western Australia. From Dubbo, New South Wales, Armstrong represented New South Wales at the under-17 and under-19 levels, and going on to represent the Australian under-19 cricket team at both Test and One Day International level. This included the 2010 ICC Under-19 Cricket World Cup, during which Armstrong scored 240 runs to lead Australia's tournament batting averages. Having played several matches as an all-rounder for the New South Wales under-23 side in the Futures League, Armstrong was selected in New South Wales' squad for the 2010–11 KFC Twenty20 Big Bash tournament, and played a single match in the tournament, against Victoria at the Melbourne Cricket Ground.

For the inaugural season of the Big Bash League, Armstrong was signed by Sydney Thunder. He played three matches for the team, with a top score of 25 runs against Perth at ANZ Stadium. Although remaining with the Thunder, Armstrong moved to Western Australia midway through the 2011–12 Australian cricket season in an attempt to play regularly at state level. He debuted for the state in the 2011–12 Ryobi One-Day Cup, in a match against New South Wales at the WACA Ground, which remains his only match at List A level. Batting at number six, Armstrong was dismissed for a golden duck whilst batting, but took the wicket of Ben Rohrer in New South Wales' innings, and finished with 1/15 from six overs. Although not offered a state contract by the Western Australian Cricket Association, Armstrong was signed by the Perth Scorchers in July 2012. At grade cricket level, Armstrong played for the Fremantle District Cricket Club.

He now works as a director and corporate advisor to mining companies.
