= Alister McDermott =

Australian cricketer (born 1991)

Personal information
- Full name: Alister Craig McDermott
- Born: 7 June 1991 (age 35); Brisbane, Queensland, Australia
- Batting: Right-handed
- Bowling: Right-arm fast medium
- Role: Bowler
- Relatives: Craig McDermott (father); Ben McDermott (brother)

Domestic team information
- Years: Team
- 2008/09–2014/15: Queensland
- 2011/12–2014/15: Brisbane Heat
- First-class debut: 18 November 2009 Queensland v West Indies
- List A debut: 11 October 2009 Queensland v Western Australia

Career statistics
Competition	FC	LA	T20
Matches	20	27	25
Runs scored	226	37	7
Batting average	13.29	18.50	1.75
100s/50s	0/0	0/0	0/0
Top score	41	13	5
Balls bowled	3,917	1,468	489
Wickets	75	48	29
Bowling average	24.77	24.70	23.10
5 wickets in innings	2	1	0
10 wickets in match	0	0	0
Best bowling	3/36	5/64	4/37
Catches/stumpings	3/–	8/–	7/–
- Source: ESPNCricinfo, 9 October 2020

Alister Craig McDermott (born 7 June 1991) is an Australian former cricketer who played for Queensland in Australian domestic cricket. He made his Queensland List A cricket debut on 11 October 2009 against Western Australia, and his First Class debut on 18 November 2009, in a match against the touring West Indians. Currently, he is an industrial executive at Colliers.

He is the son of Australian Test cricketer Craig McDermott, elder brother of Ben McDermott, and has represented Australia in Youth Test and One Day Internationals at Under-19 level. He was a member of the Brisbane Heat Big Bash 02 winning team playing in the final and also the Sydney Thunder Big Bash 05 winning squad.

As of 2019 McDermott had begun serving as head coach of Wynnum Manly District Cricket Club and begun studying an education degree. In July 2020, he announced his retirement from cricket, following a string of injuries.
