= Hoppers Crossing Cricket Club =

Cricket club in Victoria, Australia

The Hoppers Crossing Cricket Club is a cricket club located in Victoria, Australia.

== History ==
The club was formed in 1977 as the Hoppers Crossing Footballers Cricket Club after it received its initial financial backing from the Hoppers Crossing Football Club (HCFC). Shortly into its first season, sufficient funds were raised to recompense the Football Club and it was renamed the Hoppers Crossing Cricket Club (HCCC).

The first team was entered into the "B-turf" section of the Sunshine Cricket Association in season 1977/78. The club were runners-up in the first season. After this, the club grew quickly to a level where four open age teams were taking the field. Junior cricket was introduced and teams were entered into a local Under-14 competition in the Wyndham area. Following the initial set up, HCCC took over the running of this competition, which comprised six teams. The club benefited greatly from this structure, as evidenced by the three Under-14 premierships in a row, on entry into the SCA's Under-14 competition. At the commencement of the 1983/84 season, it transferred into the Williamstown and District Cricket Association (WDCA). This was in conjunction with the club's move from its prior residence, in Heaths Road, to its current Hogans Road address. Shortly after this move, a turf wicket was installed on the number one oval with the assistance of the then Werribee Council. The 1986/87 season saw the appointment of the club's first ever coach, Greg Evans. In his first year at the helm, Greg took the club to the runners-up position. At the commencement of the 1989/90 season, the club took its next evolutionary step by entering its first and second elevens into the Victorian Junior Cricket Association (now the Victorian Turf Cricket Association (VTCA)). During this season under the coaching of Mark Mitchell, it won its first ever First Eleven premiership, in the North Central Division. It then gained promotion into North A through to Senior A. In 2015, the club was entered into the Victorian Sub-District Cricket Association (VSDCA). In that first season, (2015/16) the First and Third Elevens lost in the first week of finals. The Firsts to the eventual runners-up, Caulfield, and the Thirds to the season winners Yarraville. At the beginning of the 2020/21 season, the club completed their fifth ever VSDCA round sweep and first one ever in the opening round. All four sides defeated Melton with the firsts and thirds at MacPherson Park and the seconds and fourths won at home.

== HCCC Alumni ==
Since the commencement of the club, it has produced nine First Eleven District Players with five at Footscray (Mark Mitchell, Jamie Rubeli, Grant Burns, Paul Murray and Nathan Caulfield), two at North Melbourne (Trent Said, Ian Timms), two at University (Greg Kennedy and Om Patel) and one at Richmond (Brodie Andrew). Two of these players have represented Victoria at state level (Mark Mitchell in the Under 19s and Paul Murray in the Under 21s). The club has had numerous junior cricketers represented in the various representative sides available within Victoria.

Englishman Stuart Broad played for the team in the summer of 2004-05, and went on to play first-class cricket for Leicestershire, the England U-19 team in 2005 and England A in 2006. Broad played his first One Day International for England against Pakistan in 2006 and made his Test debut against Sri Lanka in 2007. He has recently succeeded in Test cricket by taking his 500th Test match wicket in the 2020 Test series between England and West Indies.

Englishman Matthew Boyce, who also represented Leicestershire recently against Pakistan played for the club in its 2003-04 season.

Hoppers Crossing is also the home club of Fawad Ahmed. Fawad played brilliantly during his time at the Cats including taking two 8 wicket hauls. He made his international debut in a T20 against England on the 29th of August, 2013. He then made his ODI debut in a match against Scotland five days later. Ahmed has also had massive success playing with Victoria in the Australian domestic one-day cup and the 4-day Sheffield Shield competition. The leg-spinner won three Shield titles in a row from 2014/15 to 2016/17.

== Current Teams ==
Currently the club fields four senior turf sides in the VSDCA, one senior turf side in the VTCA plus an Under 18 team in the same association. They also have ten junior sides in the WRJCA, a senior women's synthetic team in the NWMCA and an Over 50s veteran's team in the Veterans Cricket Victoria competition.
