= Simon Keen =

Australian cricketer (born 1987)

Simon John Cobrin Keen (born 4 October 1987) is an Australian cricketer. Keen played for the New South Wales cricket team and in the Big Bash League for Sydney Thunder in 2012–13 and Sydney Sixers in 2014–15.

Keen was born at Penrith, New South Wales in 1987. Both of his parents were born in Balclutha, New Zealand, and through his New Zealand passport he was signed by Canterbury for the 2013–14 season.

In January 2020, Keen was appointed as the head coach and high performance manager of the Vanuatu national cricket team, replacing Clint McKay. He resigned after a few months following the outbreak of the COVID-19 pandemic in Vanuatu.
