= Matthew Day =

Australian cricketer (born 1987)

Personal information
- Full name: Matthew Raymond Day
- Born: 22 September 1987 (age 38); Richmond, New South Wales, Australia
- Batting: Right-handed
- Bowling: Right-arm fast-medium

Domestic team information
- Years: Team
- 2010/11–2011/12: Tasmania
- 2011/12: Sydney Thunder
- Source: ESPNcricinfo, 20 March 2016

Matthew Raymond Day (born 22 September 1987) is an Australian cricketer. He played three List A matches for Tasmania between 2010 and 2011.
