= Paddy Upton =

Sports coach

Personal information
- Full name: Patrick Anthony Howard Upton
- Born: 5 November 1968 (age 58); Johannesburg, Transvaal, South Africa
- Nickname: Paddy
- Batting: Right-handed
- Role: Batsman

Domestic team information
- Years: Team
- 1990–1991: Western Province
- 1993–1994: Western Province

Career statistics
Competition	First-class
Matches	2
Runs scored	142
Batting average	71.00
100s/50s	1/0
Top score	100
Balls bowled	–
Wickets	–
Bowling average	–
5 wickets in innings	–
10 wickets in match	–
Best bowling	–
Catches/stumpings	1/0
- Source: ESPNcricinfo, 26 February 2026

Patrick Anthony Howard 'Paddy' Upton (born 5 November 1968) is a South African-born cricket coach and former cricketer. He also served as a professor of practice at Deakin University. He attained his master's degree in sports science at University of Cape Town.

He worked as the strength and conditioning coach for the South Africa cricket team (1994–1998) and the Western Province rugby team (1999)

Changing careers following a second master's degree in business coaching from Middlesex University (2003), and along with Gary Kirsten as head coach, Upton was appointed "mental conditioning and strategic leadership coach" of the Indian national cricket team in 2008. Under Kirsten and Upton, the team attained the ICC top Test team ranking for their first time (2009), and went on to win the 2011 ICC World Cup. Following this success, Upton was appointed performance director of the South Africa Cricket Team (Proteas) from 2011 to 2014, during which time they became the first team to simultaneously hold the ICC world number 1 ranking in all three formats of the international game.

Between 2012 and 2018, Upton has been head coach in 12 professional T20 cricket seasons, for five different teams across three tournaments, including the Indian Premier League, Australian Big Bash League and the Pakistan Super League. His accomplishments as head coach include leading the Rajasthan Royals team from four years near the bottom of the IPL log to IPL semi-finalists and Champions League finalists in his first season (2013), including a record 13 straight home wins. He joined the Sydney Thunder team after they had lost 21 out of 22 matches in the first three seasons of the Big Bash League, leading them to Big Bash League Champions two seasons later, in BBL05.

Upton has degrees from four different Universities, including two master's degrees. In 2015 he was awarded the Nelson Mandela Metropolitan University Achiever Award, awarded to alumni who made significant contributions to their specialist fields and contributed to the development and well-being of society at local, provincial, national or international levels. In 2017, he was appointed professor of practice at Deakin University.

== Biography ==
Upton was born on 5 November 1968 in Johannesburg, Transvaal, South Africa. He represented the Western Province Schools U19 cricket team from grade 10 to grade 12 (1984–1986), captaining the team in 1986. He represented the Western Province U23 cricket team from 1988 to 1992, as captain in 1991–1992, and played for the Western Province senior cricket team in 1990-91 and 1993–94, scoring a century on first-class debut.

Upton played rugby for Maties (Stellenbosch University), for the first XV at University of Port Elizabeth (1990), as well as for the University of Cape Town (1991). In a strange twist, he received one cap (1990) for the South African Rugby Association team, an apartheid-era team comprising the best black African (not white, coloured, Muslim or Indian) players in South Africa at the time. Upton is classified white (caucasian).

In 1994 and at age 25 he retired from competitive cricket and rugby to take up the position of full-time Strength and Conditioning coach of the South African national cricket team.

Following his work as Strength and Conditioning coach (of South African cricket and Western Province rugby) in 1999 Upton was a co-founder and managing director of Street Universe, a Section-21 (non-profit) organisation founded to rehabilitate the 400-odd hardened street children and youth living on the streets in the Cape Town CBD and surrounds. Thanks to the backing of Ex-springbok rugby captain and later manager Morne du Plessis, the organisation received funding from amongst other, the Laureus Sport for Good Foundation. Following Upton's resignation in 2002, Street Universe merged with another organisation under new leadership.

== Strength and Conditioning coach ==
After completing a master's degree in Sport Science and at age 25, Upton cut his playing-career short to take up the full-time position of Strength and conditioning Coach for the South African cricket team, from 1994 to 1998. He was also involved as a key strategist with the team coach Bob Woolmer and then-captain Hansie Cronje. In 1999 he changed codes to rugby, spend a year working as Strength and Conditioning Coach of the Western Province Vodacom Cup rugby team.

== Mental coach ==
With a sport psychology major, and a second master's degree (in Business Coaching), Upton redefined his career to begin work as Mental Conditioning coach (in sport) and Executive Coach (in Business) in 2003. He has since worked as Mental Coach and/or Performance Consultant to over 20 professional cricket, rugby, soccer and field hockey teams across South Africa, India and Australia. He has also served as personal Mental Coach to over 100 professional athletes from 11 different sports, and across five continents, including cricket, rugby, soccer, golf, tennis, swimming and World Tour surfing (2003 – current).

Upton worked for one season (2014) as Mental Coach and Performance Consultant to the Eastern Province Kings Currie Cup rugby team, under coach Carlos Spencer.

Upton served as Gukesh Dommaraju's mental conditioning coach for the World Chess Championship 2024 against Ding Liren, for six months.

== Indian Cricket Team ==
Having been appointed the head coach of India in 2008, Gary Kirsten recommended the appointment of Upton in the dual role of Mental Conditioning coach and Strategic Leadership Coach. Kirsten described Upton's support and guidance as invaluable. The duo of Kirsten and Upton spent three years with the Indian team, during which time the team attained the top test ICC team ranking for their first time (2009), and went on to win the ICC World Cup in 2011 – with India having last won that tournament 28 years prior.

Upton was brought back to the Indian team as a mental conditioning expert in July 2022, during the India tour of West Indies.

== South African Cricket Team ==
Following success with the Indian Cricket team, Upton was appointed Performance Director of the South Africa Cricket Team (Proteas) from 2011 to 2014. During this period they became the first team to simultaneously hold the Official ICC World number 1 ranking in all three formats of the game. The Proteas retained the Number one ranking from August 2012 to December 2015.

== Head coach ==
Between 2013 and 2018 Upton worked as head coach in 12 professional T20 cricket seasons, for five different teams across three tournaments, in Australia, India and UAE. He was appointed head coach of a 6th team, the Durban Qalandars in South Africa's T20 Global League, before the tournament was postponed.

=== Indian Premier League ===
Upton was head coach of Pune Warriors in 2012, of Rajasthan Royals for three seasons (2013–2015) and then Delhi Daredevils for two seasons (2016–2017) in the Indian Premier League. Under his coaching, the Rajasthan Royals team went from four years near the bottom of the IPL log, to IPL Semi-finalists and Champions League finalists in Upton's first season (2013), which included a record 13 straight home wins at the Sawai Mansingh Stadium in Jaipur. He got appointed as Team Catalyst of Rajasthan Royals for IPL 2022 edition. His main job was to look after mental well-being of players in bio-bubble.

=== Australian Big Bash League ===
Upton was head coach of the Sydney Thunder cricket team in the Australian Big Bash League for four seasons, from 2014 to 2018. His appointment came after the team had lost 21 out of 22 matches in the first three seasons of the Big Bash League (BBL01 to BBL03). Along with Captain Mike Hussey, Upton guided the team from wooden-spooners to Big Bash League Champions two seasons later, in BBL05. In a 2015 interview, Australian cricketer Shane Watson referred to Upton as 'one of the best coaches in the world'.

=== Pakistan Super League ===
Upton was head coach of Lahore Qalandars in the inaugural two seasons of the Pakistan Super League, hosted in Dubai (2016–2017). The team finished in 5th in both seasons.

Upton has degrees from four different universities, including two master's degrees. In 2017 he was appoint as Professor of Practice at Deakin University school of Business and Law (Melbourne, Australia). His degrees include;

- BSc (Human Movement Sciences), Stellenbosch University
- B.A Hons (Biokinetics), University of Port Elizabeth. (Including distinction for Sport Psychology major)
- MSc (Medical – Sport Science), University of Cape Town. (Thesis: Prevention of Schoolboy Rugby Injuries)
- M.A. (Professional Development – Coaching), Middlesex University (with distinction). (Thesis: Assessing professional cricket coaching (with distinction))
- Appointed Professor of Practice. Deakin University, Faculty of Business and Law (Melbourne, Australia)

Upton's has published academic papers in the South African Medical Journal (Vol 86, No 5. 1996) and the British Journal of Sports Medicine, (Vol 6. 1996) and has co-authored "The Beer Drinkers Guide to Losing Weight" (Penguin Books, 1997) and "Sharing the Passion. Conversations with Coaches" (Advanced human Technologies, 2006).

- Author of The Barefoot Coach: Life-changing insights from working with the world's best cricketers. Published May 2019 in India by Westland (Amazon), on Amazon Kindle (eBook) and self-published in South Africa. Ranked in Amazon.in top 50 sellers, and chosen by Exclusive Books (South Africa) as a 2019 Homebru Book of Choice.
