= Sydney Thunder =

Australian franchise professional cricket team

- Nickname: Thunder
- League: Big Bash League
- Association: Cricket Australia

Personnel
- Captain: David Warner
- Coach: Andrew Flintoff
- Owner: Cricket New South Wales

Team information
- City: Sydney, New South Wales
- Colours: Electric green
- Founded: 2011; 15 years ago
- Home ground: Sydney Showground Stadium
- Capacity: 22,102

History
- Big Bash League wins: 1 (BBL |05)
- Official website: sydneythunder.com.au
Regular kit
Indigenous kit

The Sydney Thunder is an Australian men's professional franchise cricket team, competing in Australia's domestic Twenty20 (T20) cricket competition, the Big Bash League (BBL). Along with the Sydney Sixers, the Thunder is the successor to the New South Wales Blues which played in the now-defunct KFC Twenty20 Big Bash. Since the inaugural 2011–12 Big Bash League season, the Thunder have won one title, and appeared in two finals.

== History ==
Along with the Sydney Sixers, the Sydney Thunder is the successor to the New South Wales Blues which played in the now-defunct KFC Twenty20 Big Bash. The NSW Cricket board unanimously decided on lime green as the team's colour, though other colours were considered, and rejected as being too close to other Sydney sports teams. Cricket Australia did not allow Cricket NSW to use the sky blue colour traditionally associated with New South Wales sports teams.

The team made its debut in the 2011-12 Big Bash League season – the inaugural season of the Big Bash League. The team performed poorly in its first few years in the competition, finishing last in each of its first three seasons and second last in its fourth season.

From 2011 to 2014, the Thunder's home ground was Stadium Australia in Sydney Olympic Park. The team played its final two games of the 2014-15 Big Bash League season at Sydney Showground Stadium after it was unable to use Stadium Australia due to the 2015 AFC Asian Cup association football tournament. In June 2015, the Thunder announced the team would leave Stadium Australia and play all home games at Sydney Showground Stadium until the 2024–25 BBL season.

The 2015–16 Big Bash League season marked the first year in which the Thunder finished in the top half of the table, finishing 4th overall. Having won the first three games of the season and boasting a squad including Michael Hussey, Shane Watson, Usman Khawaja and Jacques Kallis, the Thunder soon became the favourites to win the tournament. However, the Thunder lost their following four games and were in danger of missing the finals. In their final game of the 2015–16 Big Bash League season, the Thunder defeated the Sixers for only the second time in their history to book a finals berth. The Thunder faced the Adelaide Strikers at Adelaide Oval in the first semi final, winning convincingly. The Thunder then faced the Melbourne Stars in the final. The final was played at Melbourne Cricket Ground on 24 January 2016 and resulted in the Thunder defeating the Melbourne Stars by 3 wickets. Michael Hussey announced his retirement from domestic cricket during BBL05, at the conclusion of the tournament he was announced the club's Director of Cricket, responsible for managing recruitment, contracts, facilities and scouting for the BBL squad. The Thunder were the most watched sports team in Australia during 2015–16 with an average TV audience of 1.2m.

Watson was elected to captain the team in 2016. Watson captained the Thunder for three seasons, failing to qualify for the finals in each of them.

In 2019, Callum Ferguson was named as the new Thunder captain, subsequently qualifying for the finals during his two seasons in charge. Chris Green and Jason Sangha shared the captaincy role for the COVID-19 affected 2021–22 season as the Thunder were knocked out in their first finals game after finishing 3rd on the ladder.

In a league game on 16 December 2022 against the Adelaide Strikers, the Thunder were dismissed for 15 in 5.5 overs, breaking the record for both the shortest completed innings and the lowest score in one in all men's professional T20 matches.

=== Role in the community ===
The MoneyGram Thunder Nation Cup gives cricket players from seven cultural backgrounds the chance to experience the fun and excitement of Twenty20 cricket, whilst representing their community. The winning team from each community cricket round will represent their country in the MoneyGram Thunder Nation Cup Semi Finals, with the two winners of the semi-finals playing off in a Grand Final prior to a Sydney Thunder match at Spotless Stadium.

The Thunder Bus travels around schools and cricket clubs in Sydney and Regional NSW, it has an interactive quiz and inflatable nets. The Thunder Bus directly engaged with 100,000 children aged between 5- 12 during this period and was seen by over 1 Million people.

=== Personnel ===
Sydney Thunder, like every other team, had a salary cap of $1 million for the first season of the Big Bash League, but in that season they spent almost half of the salary cap on the explosive opening combination of Chris Gayle and David Warner. Gayle was pursued by Perth Scorchers but he rejected an offer of $250,000 to stay with the New South Wales team.

== Season summaries ==
Chart of yearly table positions for Sydney Thunder in BBL

Season	W–L	Pos.	Finals	Coach	Captain	Most Runs	Most Wickets	Most Valuable Player	Refs
2011–12	2–5	8th	DNQ	Shane Duff	David Warner (Note: Daniel Smith stood in as acting captain for six games.)	Chris Gayle – 252	Scott Coyte – 8	–	
2012–13	0–8	8th	DNQ	Shane Duff	Chris Rogers (Note: Chris Gayle stood in as acting captain for two games.)	Usman Khawaja – 206	Dirk Nannes – 11	–	
2013–14	1–7	8th	DNQ	Chandika Hathurusingha	Michael Hussey	Michael Hussey – 258	Gurinder Sandhu – 10	–	
2014–15	2–5	7th	DNQ	Paddy Upton	Michael Hussey (Note: Chris Hartley stood in as acting captain for two games.)	Aiden Blizzard – 258	Gurinder Sandhu – 8	–	
2015–16	4–4	4th	C	Paddy Upton	Michael Hussey (Note: Shane Watson stood in as acting captain for one game.)	Usman Khawaja – 345	Clint McKay – 18	Usman Khawaja and Shane Watson	
2016–17	3–5	8th	DNQ	Paddy Upton	Shane Watson (Note: Ben Rohrer stood in as acting captain for two games.)	Kurtis Patterson – 173	Fawad Ahmed – 9	Pat Cummins	
2017–18	4–6	6th	DNQ	Paddy Upton	Shane Watson	Shane Watson – 331	Fawad Ahmed – 12	Shane Watson	
2018–19	6–7	6th	DNQ	Shane Bond	Shane Watson	Callum Ferguson – 442	Daniel Sams – 15	Callum Ferguson	
2019–20	6–7	5th	CF	Shane Bond	Callum Ferguson	Alex Hales – 576	Daniel Sams – 30^ (Note: Tied with Peter Siddle who also took 30 wickets in BBL|11.)	Daniel Sams	
2020–21	8–6	3rd	KF	Shane Bond	Callum Ferguson	Alex Hales – 543*	Tanveer Sangha – 21	Alex Hales	
2021–22	9–5	3rd	KF	Trevor Bayliss	Usman Khawaja (Note: Chris Green and Jason Sangha stood in as acting captain for ten and three games respectively.)	Jason Sangha – 445	Daniel Sams – 19	Sam Billings	
2022–23	7–7	4th	EF	Trevor Bayliss	Jason Sangha (Note: Chris Green stood in as acting captain for 12 games.)	Ollie Davies – 333	Daniel Sams – 18	Chris Green	
2023–24	1–7	8th	DNQ	Trevor Bayliss	Chris Green	Alex Hales – 258	Daniel Sams – 12	Tanveer Sangha	
2024–25	5–3	3rd	RU	Trevor Bayliss	David Warner	David Warner – 405	Chris Green – 12	David Warner	
2025–26	2–8	8th	DNQ	Trevor Bayliss	David Warner (Note: Chris Green stood in as acting captain for one game.)	David Warner – 433	Daniel Sams – 12	Chris Green	

Legend
DNQ	Did not qualify	SF	Semi-finalists	*	Led the league
EF	Lost the Eliminator	RU	Runners-up	^	League record
KF	Lost the Knockout	CF	Lost the Challenger	C	Champions

== Captains ==
There have been 12 captains in the Thunder's history, including matches featuring an acting captain.

Captain	Span	M	Won	Lost	Tied	NR	W–L%
David Warner	2011–26	23	10	11	0	2	47.62
Daniel Smith	2011–12	6	1	5	0	0	16.67
Chris Rogers	2012	6	0	6	0	0	0
Chris Gayle	2013	2	0	2	0	0	0
Michael Hussey	2013–16	23	9	14	0	0	39.13
Chris Hartley	2015	2	0	1	0	1	0
Shane Watson	2016–19	31	13	17	0	1	43.33
Ben Rohrer	2016	2	0	2	0	0	0
Callum Ferguson	2019–21	32	16	15	0	1	51.61
Chris Green	2021–25	33	13	18	0	2	41.94
Jason Sangha	2022	6	3	3	0	0	50
Usman Khawaja	2022	2	1	1	0	0	50

== Home grounds ==
Venue	Games hosted by season															
Venue	01	02	03	04	05	06	07	08	09	10	11	12	13	14	15	Total
Accor Stadium	4	4	4	2	0	0	0	0	0	0	0	0	0	0	0	14
ENGIE Stadium	0	0	0	2	4	4	4	5	5	0	3	5	3	5	4	44
Lavington Sports Ground	0	0	0	0	0	0	0	0	0	0	0	1	0	0	0	1
Corroboree Group Oval Manuka	0	0	0	0	0	0	1	2	2	7	2	2	2	1	1	20

== Current squad ==
The squad of the Sydney Thunder for the 2026–27 Big Bash League season as of 22 October 2026.

- Players with international caps are listed in **bold**.

No.	Name	Nat.	Birth Date	Batting Style	Bowling Style	Additional Info.
Batters
5	**Sam Konstas**	Australia	2 October 2005 (age 21)	Right-handed	Right-arm leg spin	
53	**Nic Maddinson**	Australia	21 December 1991 (age 34)	Left-handed	Left-arm orthodox	
31	**David Warner**	Australia	27 October 1986 (age 40)	Left-handed	Right-arm medium	Captain
All-rounders
93	**Chris Green**	Australia	1 October 1993 (age 33)	Right-handed	Right-arm off spin	
93	Aidan O'Connor	Australia	13 July 2006 (age 20)	Right-handed	Right-arm medium-fast	
19	Will Salzmann	Australia	19 November 2003 (age 22)	Right-handed	Right-arm medium-fast	
95	**Daniel Sams**	Australia	27 October 1992 (age 34)	Right-handed	Left-arm fast	
Wicket-keepers
1	**Cameron Bancroft**	Australia	19 November 1992 (age 33)	Right-handed	—N/a	
77	**Sam Billings**	England	15 June 1991 (age 35)	Right-handed	—N/a	International Signing
22	Matt Gilkes	Australia	21 August 1999 (age 27)	Left-handed	—N/a	
Bowlers
18	**Trent Boult**	New Zealand	22 July 1989 (age 37)	Right-handed	Right-arm fast-medium	International Signing
69	**Lockie Ferguson**	New Zealand	13 June 1991 (age 35)	Right-handed	Right-arm fast	International Signing
34	Ryan Hadley	Australia	17 November 1998 (age 28)	Right-handed	Right-arm fast	
17	**Tanveer Sangha**	Australia	26 November 2001 (age 24)	Right-handed	Right-arm leg spin	

== Players ==
=== Australian representatives ===
(Australia) The following is a list of cricketers who have played for the Thunder after making their debut in the national men's team (the period they spent as both a Thunder squad member and an Australian-capped player is in brackets):

- Doug Bollinger (BBL|01)
- Trent Copeland (BBL|01)
- Usman Khawaja (BBL|01–11)
- David Warner (BBL|01, 03, 12–16)
- Mark Cosgrove (BBL|02, 04)
- Dirk Nannes (BBL|02–04)
- Chris Rogers (BBL|02)
- Michael Hussey (BBL|03–05)
- Pat Cummins (BBL|04–08)
- Nathan Hauritz (BBL|04)
- Andrew McDonald (BBL|04–05)
- Gurinder Sandhu (BBL|04–09, 11–13)
- Fawad Ahmed (BBL|05–08)
- Clint McKay (BBL|05–06)
- Ben Rohrer (BBL|05–07)
- Shane Watson (BBL|05–08)
- Callum Ferguson (BBL|07–10)
- Chris Tremain (BBL|09–10)
- Ben Cutting (BBL|10–12)
- Daniel Sams (BBL|10–16)
- Cameron Bancroft (BBL|13–16)
- Chris Green (BBL|13–16)
- Tanveer Sangha (BBL|13–14)
- Wes Agar (BBL|14–15)
- Dan Christian (BBL|14)
- Sam Konstas (BBL|14–16)
- Nic Maddinson (BBL|14–16)

=== Overseas marquees ===
- (Cricket West Indies) Fidel Edwards (BBL|01)
- (Cricket West Indies) Chris Gayle (BBL|01–02)
- (New Zealand) Martin Guptill (BBL|02)
- (Pakistan) Azhar Mahmood (BBL|02)
- (England) Matt Prior (BBL|02)
- (Sri Lanka) Tillakaratne Dilshan (BBL|03)
- (Sri Lanka) Ajantha Mendis (BBL|03)
- (England) Eoin Morgan (BBL|03–04, 06)
- (England) Chris Woakes (BBL|03)
- (South Africa) Cameron Delport (BBL|04)
- (South Africa) Jacques Kallis (BBL|04–05)
- (England) Jason Roy (BBL|04)
- (New Zealand) Henry Nicholls (BBL|05)
- (Cricket West Indies) Andre Russell (BBL|05–06)
- (Cricket West Indies) Carlos Brathwaite (BBL|06)
- (England) James Vince (BBL|06–07)
- (England) Jos Buttler (BBL|07–08)
- (New Zealand) Mitchell McClenaghan (BBL|07)
- (New Zealand) Anton Devcich (BBL|08)
- (England) Chris Jordan (BBL|08)
- (England) Joe Root (BBL|08)
- (England) Alex Hales (BBL|09–13)
- (South Africa) Chris Morris (BBL|09)
- (England) Sam Billings (BBL|10–11, 14–16)
- (New Zealand) Adam Milne (BBL|14)
- (Pakistan) Mohammad Hasnain (BBL|11, 14)
- (England) Saqib Mahmood (BBL|11)
- (Afghanistan) Fazalhaq Farooqi (BBL|12)
- (Pakistan) Usman Qadir (BBL|12)
- (South Africa) Rilee Rossouw (BBL|12)
- (Pakistan) Zaman Khan (BBL|13)
- (England) Tom Kohler-Cadmore (BBL|13)
- (New Zealand) Lockie Ferguson (BBL|14–16)
- (England) George Garton (BBL|14)
- (Cricket West Indies) Sherfane Rutherford (BBL|14)
- (Pakistan) Shadab Khan (BBL|15)
- (New Zealand) Trent Boult (BBL|16)

== Honours ==
- Champions (1): BBL |05
- Runners-Up (1): BBL |14
- Minor Premiers (0):
- Finals series appearances (6): BBL |05, BBL |09, BBL |10, BBL |11, BBL |12, BBL |14
- Wooden Spoons (6): BBL |01, BBL |02, BBL |03, BBL |06, BBL |13 ,BBL |15

== Statistics and awards ==
=== Team stats ===
- Win–loss record:

Big Bash League:

Opposition	M	Won	Lost	Tied	NR	W–L%
Adelaide Strikers	25	10	13	0	2	43.48
Brisbane Heat	24	8	15	0	1	34.78
Hobart Hurricanes	25	8	16	0	1	33.33
Melbourne Renegades	20	9	10	0	1	47.37
Melbourne Stars	23	12	11	0	0	52.17
Perth Scorchers	21	11	10	0	0	52.38
Sydney Sixers	30	8	20	0	2	28.57
Total	168	66	95	0	7	40.99

- Highest score in an innings: 5/232 (20 overs) vs Sydney Sixers, 22 January 2021
- Highest successful chase: 8/183 (19.4 overs) vs Adelaide Strikers, 17 December 2024
- Lowest successful defence: 6/142 (20 overs) vs Perth Scorchers, 2 January 2019
- Largest victory:
  - Batting first: 129 runs vs Melbourne Renegades, 26 December 2020 and 8 January 2022
  - Batting second: 60 balls remaining vs Sydney Sixers, 14 January 2017
- Longest winning streak: 6 matches (28 December 2021 – 10 January 2022)
- Longest losing streak: 19 matches (30 December 2011 – 11 January 2014)

=== Individual stats ===
- Most runs: Alex Hales – 2,005
- Highest score in an innings: David Warner – 130* (65) vs Hobart Hurricanes, 3 January 2026
- Highest partnership: Michael Hussey and Jacques Kallis – 160 vs Brisbane Heat, 21 December 2014
- Most wickets: Daniel Sams – 121
- Best bowling figures in an innings: Nathan McAndrew – 5/16 (4 overs) vs Melbourne Stars, 22 January 2025
- Hat-tricks taken:
  - Gurinder Sandhu vs Perth Scorchers, 6 January 2022
- Most catches (fielder): Chris Green – 69
- Most dismissals (wicket-keeper): Sam Billings – 40 (33 catches, 7 stumpings)

=== Individual awards ===
- Player of the Match:
  - Alex Hales – 9
  - Callum Ferguson, Daniel Sams, and Shane Watson – 5
  - Matt Gilkes and Usman Khawaja – 4
  - Sam Billings, Ollie Davies, Chris Green, Gurinder Sandhu, and David Warner – 3
  - Jos Buttler, Chris Gayle, Michael Hussey, Jacques Kallis, and Nathan McAndrew – 2
  - Fawad Ahmed, Tom Andrews, Aiden Blizzard, Jonathan Cook, Pat Cummins, Zaman Khan, Saqib Mahmood, Eoin Morgan, Chris Morris, Alex Ross, Andre Russell, Sherfane Rutherford, and Jason Sangha – 1
- BBL Player of the Final:
  - Usman Khawaja – BBL|05
- BBL Player of the Tournament:
  - Jacques Kallis – BBL|04
- BBL Team of the Tournament:
  - Daniel Sams (3) – BBL|09, BBL|10, BBL|11
  - David Warner (2) – BBL|14, BBL|15
  - Michael Hussey – BBL|05
  - Andre Russell – BBL|05
  - Fawad Ahmed – BBL|07
  - Shane Watson – BBL|07
  - Callum Ferguson – BBL|08
  - Alex Hales – BBL|10
  - Jason Sangha – BBL|11
  - Sam Billings – BBL|14

== Sydney Smash ==
When the league began in 2011, Cricket Australia decided they would place two teams in Sydney. With the core group of players for both teams coming from the New South Wales cricket team, this rivalry automatically becomes widely anticipated in the city. In the first four seasons of the league the Thunder lost all seven Sydney derby games to the Sydney Sixers.

=== List of Sydney Smash Matches ===
Date	Winner	Margin	Venue	Attendance	Player of the match
8 January 2012	Sixers	17 Runs (D/L)	ANZ Stadium	31,262	Mitchell Starc
8 December 2012	Sixers	7 wickets	SCG	15,279	Brad Haddin
30 December 2012	Sixers	4 wickets	ANZ Stadium	20,986	Daniel Hughes
21 December 2013	Sixers	6 wickets	SCG	18,180	Nic Maddinson
25 January 2014	Sixers	8 wickets	ANZ Stadium	25,726	Nathan Lyon
27 December 2014	Sixers	16 runs	ANZ Stadium	32,823	Aiden Blizzard
22 January 2015	Sixers	4 wickets	SCG	36,487	Jordan Silk
17 December 2015	Thunder	36 runs	Spotless Stadium	18,287	Michael Hussey
16 January 2016	Thunder	46 runs	SCG	38,456	Shane Watson
20 December 2016	Sixers	9 wickets	Spotless Stadium	21,798	Moises Henriques
14 January 2017	Thunder	8 wickets	SCG	39,756	Fawad Ahmed
19 December 2017	Thunder	5 wickets	Spotless Stadium	21,589	Shane Watson
13 January 2018	Sixers	8 wickets	SCG	36,458	Chris Green
24 December 2018	Thunder	21 runs	Spotless Stadium	10,508	Jos Buttler
2 February 2019	Sixers	9 wickets (D/L)	SCG	34,385	Sean Abbott
28 December 2019	Sixers	Super Over	SCG	35,296	Tom Curran
18 January 2020	Thunder	4 runs (D/L)	Giants Stadium	15,476	Chris Morris
13 January 2021	Sixers	5 wickets (D/L)	Manuka Oval		Steve O'Keefe
21 January 2021	Thunder	46 runs	Adelaide Oval		Alex Hales
26 December 2021	Sixers	30 runs (D/L)	Sydney Showground Stadium		Dan Christian
15 January 2022	Sixers	60 runs	Sydney Cricket Ground		Steve O'Keefe
8 January 2023	Sixers	7 wickets	Sydney Showground Stadium		Sean Abbott
21 January 2023	Sixers	125 runs	Sydney Cricket Ground		Steve Smith

== See also ==
- Cricket in New South Wales
- Cricket NSW
- List of Sydney Thunder cricketers
