= Clint McKay =

Australian cricketer (born 1983)

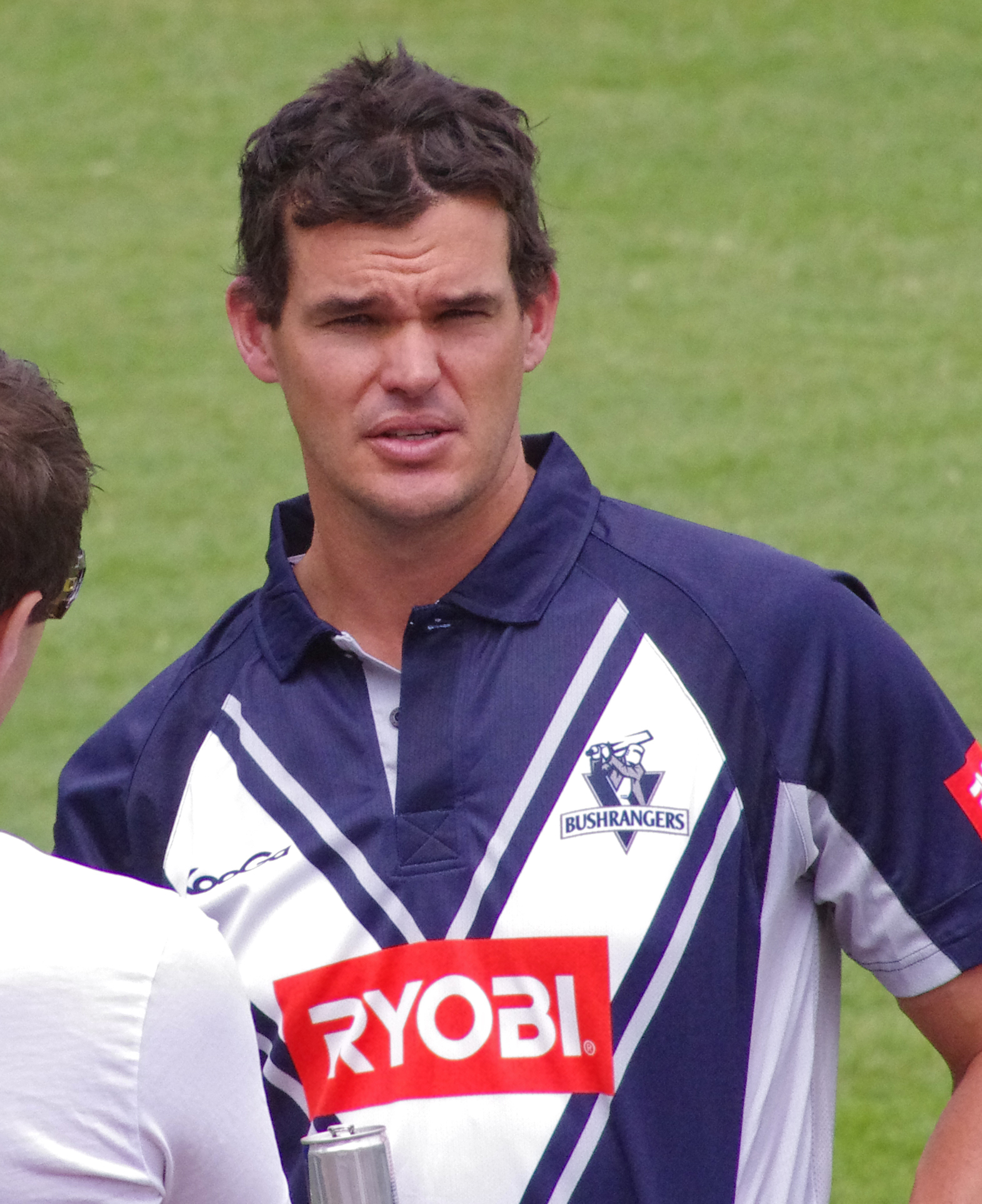

Personal information
- Full name: Clinton James McKay
- Born: 22 February 1983 (age 43); Melbourne, Victoria, Australia
- Batting: Right-handed
- Bowling: Right-arm fast-medium
- Role: Bowler

International information
- National side: Australia (2009–2014)
- Only Test (cap 412): 16 December 2009 v West Indies
- ODI debut (cap 181): 5 November 2009 v India
- Last ODI: 26 January 2014 v England
- ODI shirt no.: 27

Domestic team information
- Years: Team
- 2006/07–2015/16: Victoria (squad no. 15)
- 2010: Yorkshire
- 2011–2012: Mumbai Indians
- 2011/12–2014/15: Melbourne Stars
- 2013: Sunrisers Hyderabad
- 2015–2017: Leicestershire
- 2015/16–2017/18: Sydney Thunder

Career statistics
Competition	Test	ODI	FC	LA
Matches	1	59	85	123
Runs scored	10	190	2,097	610
Batting average	10.00	9.04	19.78	12.44
100s/50s	0/0	0/0	0/8	0/1
Top score	10	30	66	57
Balls bowled	168	2,965	16,548	6,296
Wickets	1	97	281	174
Bowling average	101.00	24.37	27.71	28.32
5 wickets in innings	0	2	7	2
10 wickets in match	0	0	0	0
Best bowling	1/56	5/28	6/40	5/28
Catches/stumpings	1/–	7/–	18/–	17/–
- Source: ESPNcricinfo, 16 September 2017

Clinton James McKay (born 22 February 1983) is an Australian former international cricketer. He was a member of the Victoria side and has represented Australia at One Day International (ODI) and Test level. A right-arm fast-medium bowler who stands at 194 cm, he made his first class debut for Victoria in November 2006. He later took 6/34 for Victoria's 2nd XI and forced his way into the one-day team, debuting against Tasmania at the MCG.

== Domestic career ==
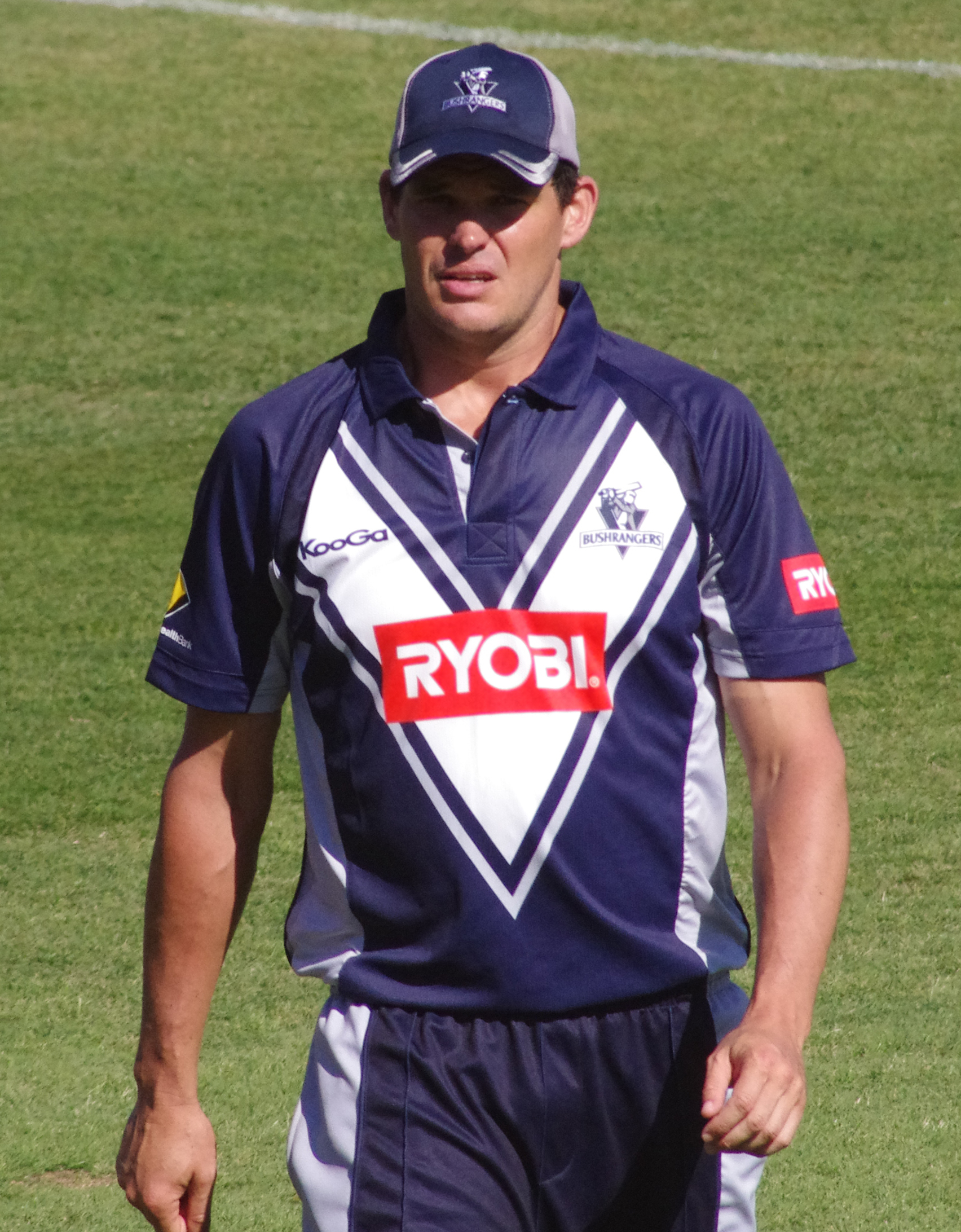
McKay playing for Victoria in 2011

Mckay made his first class debut for Victoria in November 2006. He later took 6/34 for Victoria's 2nd XI and forced his way into the one-day team, debuting against Tasmania at the MCG. He plays district club cricket for Essendon.

McKay commenced his cricket at an early age at Pascoe Vale Central Cricket Club in the North West Cricket Association (NWCA). His time there saw him presented with many accolades which included representing the NWCA at junior levels. His representation of the NWCA in the under-21 Neil Wright Shield during the 2001–02 season was the stepping stone before launching his career at Essendon Cricket Club the following season. Upon arrival at Essendon Cricket Club it was obvious to see that they had found talent. In his time at Essendon he has proven to be a talented bowling allrounder. His performance added to this perception of him by scoring two well-timed hundreds with the willow. At the commencement of the 2009–10 season McKay was awarded the captaincy of Essendon Cricket Club.

On 21 May 2010, McKay joined Yorkshire CCC as the second overseas player for the T20 competition, partnering South African Herschelle Gibbs.

He returned to English county cricket in 2015 with Leicestershire and while he struggled to have an impact in the County Championship, he was a force for the Foxes in the shorter formats of the game finishing the 2017 t20 Blast season as the highest wicket taker (23) including record figures of 5 for 11 at New Road vs Worcestershire.

=== Indian Premier League ===
On 9 January 2011, he was purchased by Mumbai Indians for $110,000.

He played for Sunrisers Hyderabad in the 2013 IPL.

== International career ==
On 5 November 2009, after a string of injuries to key Australian bowlers, he made his ODI debut against India and returned figures of 3/58 from 10 overs, including the wicket of Sachin Tendulkar.

On 31 January 2010 against Pakistan, McKay earned his first man of the match award after taking 4/35 from 9.3 overs. His first international five-wicket haul came against Sri Lanka on 7 November 2010.

On 14 September 2013 McKay took his first ODI hat-trick against England in Cardiff. He dismissed Kevin Pietersen, Jonathan Trott & Joe Root in three consecutive balls but Australia still lost the match.

On 17 January 2014 McKay helped Australia chase down 301 against England. His partnership of 57 with James Faulkner for the 10th wicket helped Australia win the match after being 9/244.

McKay made his T20I debut on 31 October 2010 against Sri Lanka. He took his maiden T20I wicket in his fourth match, bowling West Indian skipper Darren Sammy.

McKay made his Test debut against the West Indies in Perth in December 2009. He was wicketless from 14 overs bowled in the first innings but picked up his maiden test wicket in the second, bowling Denesh Ramdin.

== Coaching career ==
In August 2019, Clint McKay was appointed as the interim coach of the Vanuatu national cricket team, ahead of the 2019 Malaysia Cricket World Cup Challenge League A tournament. However, in January 2020, he was replaced by Simon Keen.
