= Fawad Ahmed =

Pakistan born Australian cricketer

Personal information
- Full name: Fawad Ahmed Khan
- Born: 10 March 1979 (age 47); Swabi, Khyber Pakhtunkhwa, Pakistan
- Height: 1.83 m (6 ft 0 in)
- Batting: Right-handed
- Bowling: Right-arm leg-break
- Role: Bowler

International information
- National side: Australia (2013)
- ODI debut (cap 203): 3 September 2013 2013 v Scotland
- Last ODI: 16 September 2013 v England
- T20I debut (cap 64): 29 August 2013 v England
- Last T20I: 31 August 2013 v England

Domestic team information
- Years: Team
- 2005/06–2009/10: Abbottabad
- 2008/09: Pakistan Customs
- 2012/13–2018/19: Victoria
- 2012/13–2014/15: Melbourne Renegades
- 2015/16–2018/19: Sydney Thunder
- 2018: Trinbago Knight Riders
- 2019–2020: Quetta Gladiators
- 2019: St Lucia Zouks
- 2019/20–2020/21: Perth Scorchers
- 2020: Trinbago Knight Riders
- 2021: Islamabad United
- 2021/22: Adelaide Strikers
- 2022: Lahore Qalandars

Career statistics
Competition	ODI	T20I	FC	T20
Matches	3	2	62	168
Runs scored	4	3	410	86
Batting average	–	–	10.78	5.73
100s/50s	0/0	0/0	0/0	0/0
Top score	4*	3*	34	19
Balls bowled	144	48	10,881	3,644
Wickets	3	3	205	172
Bowling average	48.33	22.66	31.11	24.75
5 wickets in innings	0	0	9	0
10 wickets in match	0	0	0	0
Best bowling	1/39	3/25	8/89	4/14
Catches/stumpings	0/–	0/–	15/–	22/–
- Source: Cricinfo, 5 October 2021

Fawad Ahmed (Pashto: فواد احمد; born 10 March 1979) is an Australian former cricketer. Born in Pakistan, he was granted Australian citizenship in July 2013. In August and September 2013, he played for the Australian cricket team in both a T20I and an ODI series against England. He is one of two Pakistan-born cricketers to play cricket for Australia the other is Usman Khawaja.

== Career ==
Born in Swabi, Khyber Pakhtunkhwa province, Ahmed began playing cricket for Swabi District in local competitions. Playing as a right-arm leg spinner, he made his first-class debut for Abbottabad in 2005, playing two matches before being dropped from the side. Ahmed resumed playing first-class cricket in 2009, playing for Pakistan Customs in the Quaid-i-Azam Trophy, and later that year also played three further matches for Abbottabad. His best bowling figures, 6/109, were taken for Pakistan Customs against the Karachi Whites, in January 2009.

Ahmed left Pakistan in 2010, emigrating to Australia on a short-stay visa sponsored by the Yoogali Cricket Association. Soon after arrival, he applied for refugee status, claiming he was persecuted by religious extremists for playing and coaching cricket. His hometown is in northwest Pakistan, a region that borders Afghanistan and was affected by the War in North-West Pakistan. Choosing to live in Melbourne, Victoria, Ahmed took up playing with Hoppers Crossing in the Victorian Turf Cricket Association, and soon progressed to playing for Melbourne University in Victorian Premier Cricket. Ahmed also participated in Melbourne's largest 'open' T20 event run by Infinity Cricket in 2011 & 2012 representing the Western Warriors who were winners. He was named the Best Bowler of the 2012 Infinity T20 Cricket Tournament.

Despite having his initial application declined, he was granted permanent residency in November 2012. Later that month, Ahmed signed with the Melbourne Renegades, having been granted a special exemption to play in the Big Bash League.

He made his debut in the Big Bash League in January 2013, taking 0/34 on debut, and was subsequently selected in the Prime Minister's XI to play against the West Indies.

In five one-day matches for Victoria in the Ryobi One Day Cup in 2012–13 he took 10 wickets at 18.00. He also played in Victoria's last three matches in the Sheffield Shield, taking 16 wickets at 28.37, including 2 for 79 and 5 for 83 against Queensland. In the 2014/15 Bupa Sheffield Shield final, Ahmed took the honour for the best figures in a Shield final. He took 8 for 89 in 40 overs with 9 maidens.

On 2 July 2013, Ahmed was granted Australian citizenship, clearing him to play for the full Australian national cricket team.

A devout Muslim, Ahmed has missed training sessions during Ramadan and is known to leave the field to pray during games. He has also requested that logos of sponsors whose activities he does not agree will be removed from his kit and in 2013, the logo of Victoria Bitter was removed from Ahmed's shirt, due to the fact that Islam prohibits alcohol.

On 29 August 2013, Ahmed made his Australian debut play in a T20 international against England at the Ageas Bowl in Southampton.

On 31 March 2015, Ahmed was named in the Australian Test Squad to tour the West Indies and England in 2015 following an outstanding domestic season for Victoria in the Sheffield Shield.

Ahmed switched clubs and played for Sydney Thunder during the 2015 Big Bash League season.

On 3 June 2018, he was selected to play for the Vancouver Knights in the players' draft for the inaugural edition of the Global T20 Canada tournament. In June 2019, he was selected to play for the Montreal Tigers franchise team in the 2019 Global T20 Canada tournament.

In 2019 Ahmed signed with the Perth Scorchers in the BBL. In July 2020, he was named in the Trinbago Knight Riders squad for the 2020 Caribbean Premier League. In February 2022, he was drafted by Lahore Qalandars as a replacement for Rashid Khan for the remainder of PSL 2022.

On 6 January 2023, Ahmed signed with the Melbourne Renegades in the BBL as a replacement player for Shaun Marsh who had been injured with a hamstring strain.
