= Chris Green (cricketer) =

South African-Australian cricketer

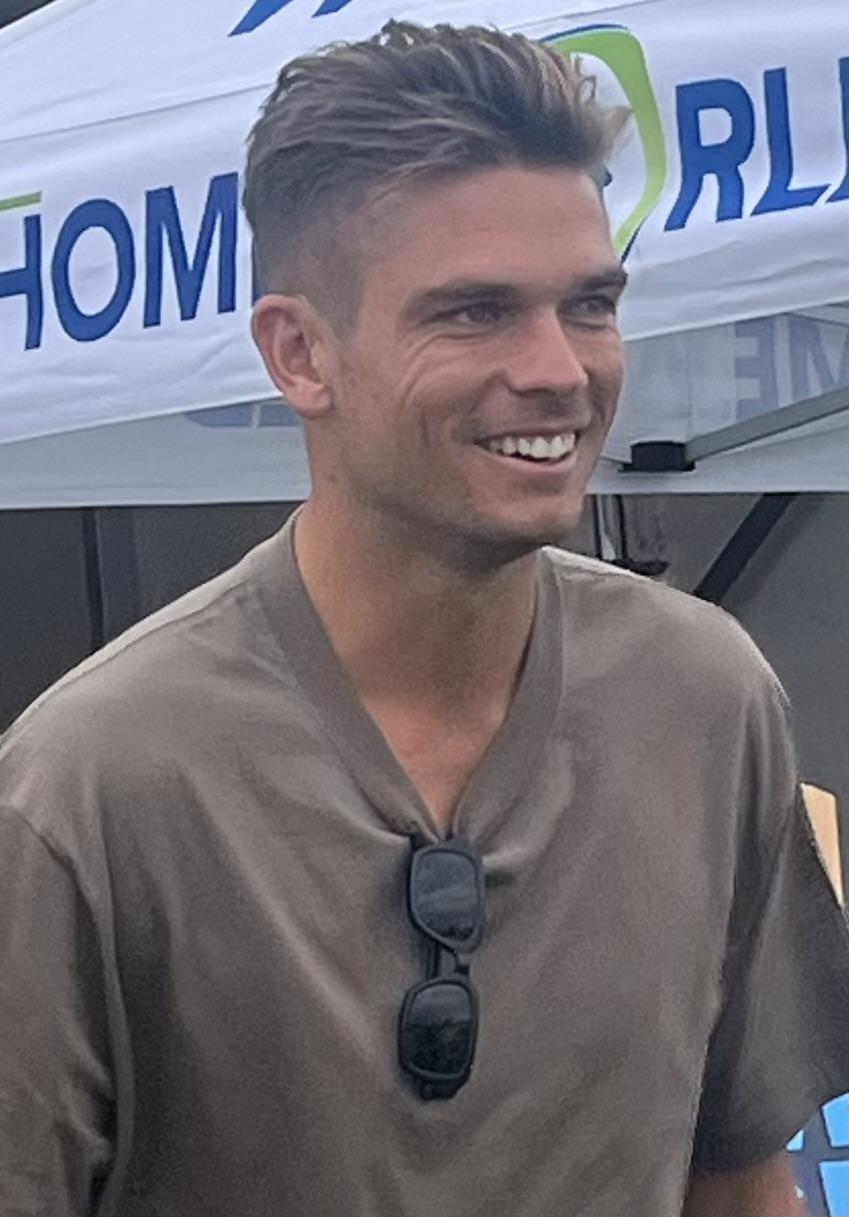
- Green in October 2025

Personal information
- Full name: Christopher James Green
- Born: 1 October 1993 (age 33); Durban, Natal Province, South Africa
- Height: 193 cm (6 ft 4 in)
- Batting: Right-handed
- Bowling: Right-arm off break
- Role: Bowling all-rounder

International information
- National side: Australia (2023)
- Only T20I (cap 108): 1 December 2023 v India

Domestic team information
- Years: Team
- 2014/15–present: New South Wales
- 2014/15–present: Sydney Thunder (squad no. 93)
- 2017: Lahore Qalandars
- 2018–2020: Guyana Amazon Warriors
- 2019: Multan Sultans
- 2019: Warwickshire
- 2020: Kolkata Knight Riders
- 2021–2022: Middlesex
- 2021–2022: Jamaica Tallawahs
- 2024–present: Lancashire
- 2024: Trent Rockets
- 2024: Antigua & Barbuda Falcons
- 2025: Welsh Fire (squad no. 93)

Career statistics
Competition	T20I	FC	LA	T20
Matches	1	27	38	292
Runs scored	2	1,146	628	2,227
Batting average	–	39.51	25.12	17.53
100s/50s	0/0	2/6	1/2	0/1
Top score	2*	160	100	50
Balls bowled	24	5,269	1,624	5,787
Wickets	0	68	40	262
Bowling average	–	33.73	33.15	26.49
5 wickets in innings	–	3	1	1
10 wickets in match	–	0	0	0
Best bowling	–	6/82	5/53	5/32
Catches/stumpings	2/–	13/–	25/–	164/–
- Source: ESPNcricinfo, 21 June 2026

Christopher James Green (born 1 October 1993) is a South African-Australian cricketer. Green bowls right-arm off-break and bats right-handed, playing as an All-rounder. He plays for New South Wales and the Sydney Thunder in the Big Bash League. He also plays Sydney Grade Cricket for Northern District Cricket Club. Green made his Thunder debut in the final round of the BBL04. He made his international debut for the Australian cricket team in December 2023.

== T20 career ==
Ahead of the 2018 Caribbean Premier League, he was named as one of five players to watch in the tournament. In June 2019, he was selected to play for the Toronto Nationals franchise team in the 2019 Global T20 Canada tournament. In the 2020 IPL auction, he was bought by the Kolkata Knight Riders ahead of the 2020 Indian Premier League.

Green received a 90-day suspension for bowling with an illegal action commencing 8 January 2020. In July 2020, Green was named as the captain of the Guyana Amazon Warriors side ahead of the 2020 Caribbean Premier League. On 11 June 2021, in the 2021 T20 Blast in England, Green took a hat-trick and a five-wicket haul for Middlesex. In July 2022, he was signed by the Kandy Falcons for the third edition of the Lanka Premier League. In November 2023, Green was named the captain of Sydney Thunder for the 2023–24 Big Bash League. Green was signed by Lancashire Lightning for the 2024 T20 Blast competition and later agreed a further two-year contract for the 2025 and 2026 editions. He captained Antigua & Barbuda Falcons in 2024 Caribbean Premier league.

== Personal life ==
Green is South African on his father's side and British on his mother's side. His parents Warren and Lisa Green (Gould), were both professional tennis players. Green holds a British passport.
