= Aiden Blizzard =

Australian cricketer (born 1984)

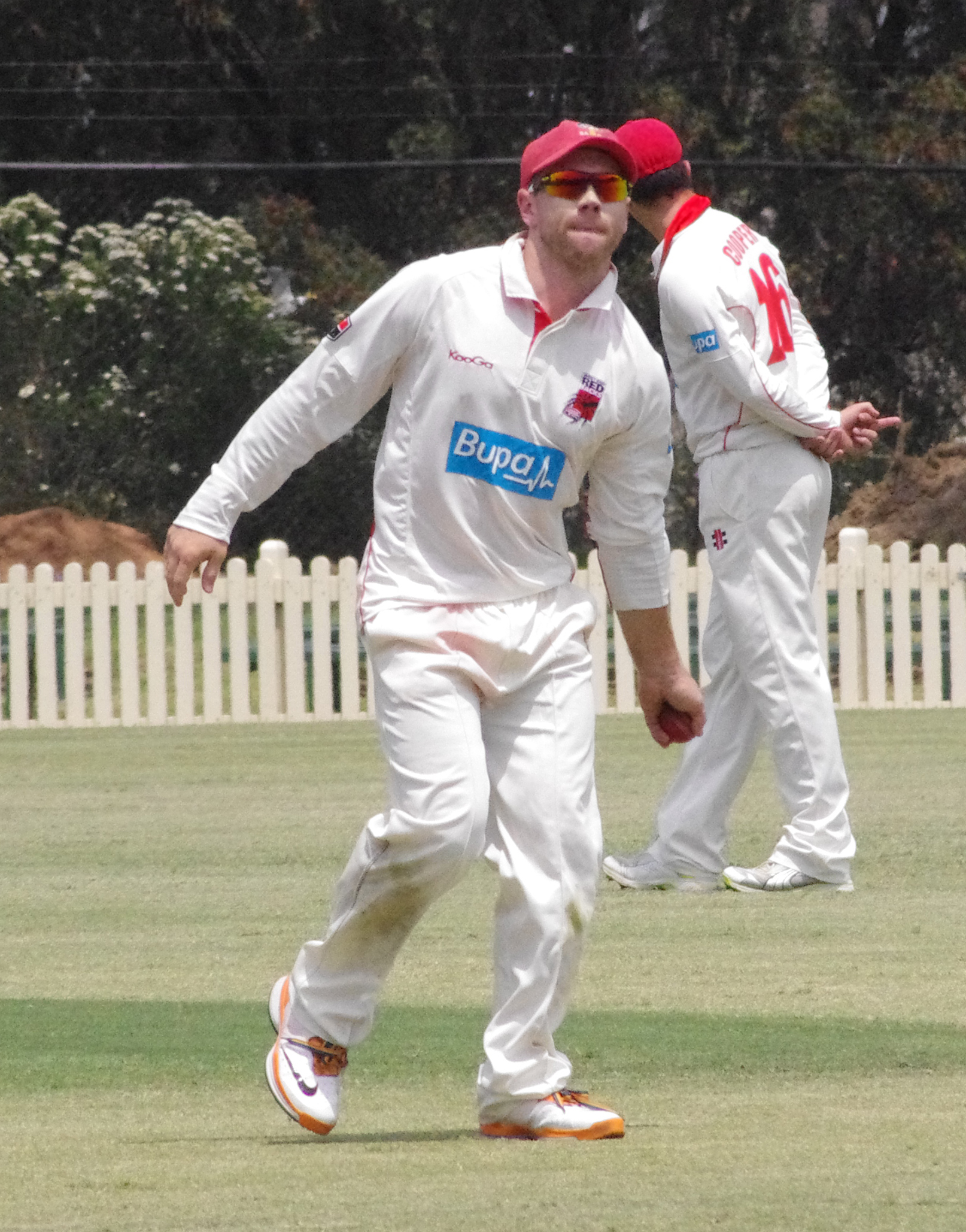

Personal information
- Full name: Aiden Craig Blizzard
- Born: 27 June 1984 (age 42); Shepparton, Victoria, Australia
- Nickname: Frosty
- Height: 180 cm (5 ft 11 in)
- Batting: Left-handed
- Bowling: Left-arm medium
- Role: Batsman

Domestic team information
- Years: Team
- 2009/10: Rajshahi Rangers
- 2010/11: South Australia
- 2011-2012: Mumbai Indians
- 2005/06–2009/10: Victoria

Career statistics
Competition	FC	LA	T20
Matches	21	40	98
Runs scored	966	733	2,043
Batting average	30.18	19.28	24.61
100s/50s	2/4	0/2	0/10
Top score	141*	72	89
Balls bowled	6	–	6
Wickets	0	–	0
Bowling average	–	–	–
5 wickets in innings	–	–	–
10 wickets in match	–	–	–
Best bowling	–	–	–
Catches/stumpings	9/–	24/–	27/–
- Source: ESPNcricinfo, 24 February 2017

Aiden Craig Blizzard (born 27 June 1984) is a former Australian cricketer who played domestic cricket for Tasmania, South Australia, and Victoria. An aggressive left-handed batsman, he hit 89 from 38 balls on his Twenty20 debut for Victoria on New Years Day 2007. His innings included 8 sixes. In 2004 he toured India and Sri Lanka with the Australian Cricket Academy. He has also played for Rajshahi Rangers in Bangladesh's NCL T20 Bangladesh.

He has struggled to maintain a regular spot in the limited overs, and in particular, the first-class team.

He notably hit 47 off 20 balls in the 20/20 final between Victoria and Western Australia. This earned him the man of the match award. His innings included hitting Danny McLauchlan for 28 runs in a single over, including one six that completely left the WACA Ground and ended up in the practise nets which is estimated to be about 118 metres away.

In April 2010 he moved from Victoria to South Australia along with bowler Rob Cassell. He had an extremely successful season which was capped off with a T20 win for South Australia against NSW. Blizzard also won the SA First class batsmen of the year award along with the highest run scorer. He was purchased by the team Mumbai Indians for IPL 2011 and was made to open the innings with Sachin Tendulkar. Blizzard played some important knocks for Mumbai Indians in 2011 edition of the Champion League Twenty20 in which they crowned as Champions. Blizzard also played for the Rajashi Division in the domestic circuit for Bangladesh.

Since 2010–11 Blizzard has been playing cricket with the Western Eagles in the SACA Grade Cricket Competition. In the 2011–12 Semi -Final Blizzard returned from a 6-week Achilles Tendon injury to score an amazing 112 from just 138 balls runs with 5 x 4s and 7 x 6s. Blizzard's innings almost single-handedly propelled the Eagles into the Grand Final, for which Blizzard was unavailable due to Indian Premier League commitments.

Blizzard returned to Victoria in 2014 and is set to debut for the Essendon Cricket Club in season 2014–2015.

In 2014–15 and 2015–16 seasons in for the Canterbury Cricket in New Zealand T20 domestic tournament.

In May 2018, he retired from professional cricket.

== See also ==
- List of South Australian representative cricketers
