= Gurinder Sandhu =

Australian cricketer

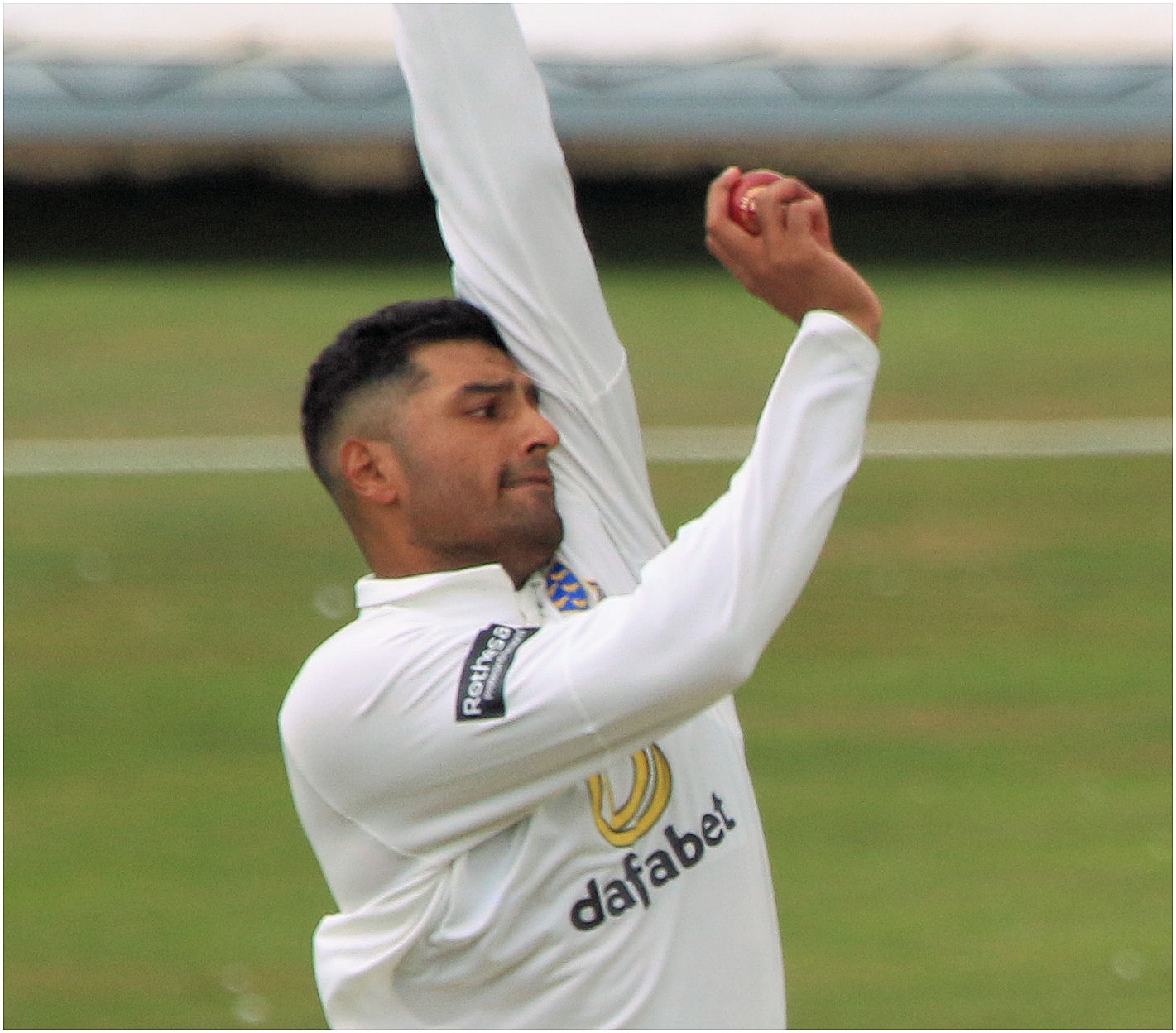
- Sandhu playing for Sussex (2025)

Personal information
- Full name: Gurinder Singh Sandhu
- Born: 14 June 1993 (age 33); Blacktown, New South Wales, Australia
- Height: 196 cm (6 ft 5 in)
- Batting: Left-handed
- Bowling: Right-arm fast-medium
- Role: Bowler

International information
- National side: Australia (2015)
- ODI debut (cap 206): 18 January 2015 v India
- Last ODI: 23 January 2015 v England
- ODI shirt no.: 28

Domestic team information
- Years: Team
- 2012/13–2017/18: New South Wales
- 2012/13–2019/20: Sydney Thunder
- 2015: Delhi Daredevils
- 2018/19–2019/20: Tasmania
- 2020/21: Sydney Sixers
- 2021/22–2025/26: Queensland
- 2021/22–2023/24: Sydney Thunder
- 2024/25–present: Melbourne Renegades (squad no. 28)
- 2025: Sussex

Career statistics
Competition	ODI	FC	LA	T20
Matches	2	63	78	87
Runs scored	–	1,113	394	157
Batting average	–	15.45	14.07	12.07
100s/50s	–	0/2	0/1	0/0
Top score	–	97*	51	20*
Balls bowled	120	11,246	3,897	1,675
Wickets	3	175	142	95
Bowling average	35.66	30.91	23.67	24.56
5 wickets in innings	0	7	3	0
10 wickets in match	0	0	0	0
Best bowling	2/49	6/57	7/56	4/22
Catches/stumpings	0/–	24/–	25/–	21/–
- Source: ESPNcricinfo, 18 May 2026

Gurinder Singh Sandhu (born 14 June 1993) is a former Australian international cricketer who also played for New South Wales, Tasmania and Queensland in domestic cricket. He is the first male cricketer of Indian descent to represent Australia in an international tournament. (Note: Two Indian–born Caucasian Australians have previously played Test cricket for Australia, Bransby Cooper in the first ever Test match and Rex Sellers in 1964. Stuart Clark is also of Anglo-Indian ancestry.)

== Early life and family ==
Sandhu was born in Blacktown, New South Wales. Coming from Indian descent, his parents emigrated to Australia in the 1980s.

== Career ==
=== Domestic career ===
Sandhu made his senior cricket debut for the Sydney Thunder in the 2011–12 Big Bash League season. He made his List A and First-class cricket debut for New South Wales at the end of the 2012–2013 Australian cricket season.

In March 2013, Sandhu was voted the Australian Cricketers' Association player of the month.

Sandhu played three games for New South Wales in the 2017–18 JLT One-Day Cup, taking 5 wickets but conceding 6.13 runs per over. His best performance of the tournament came against Western Australia, when he took 4 wickets for 57 runs in a 9-run loss.

It was announced on 26 April 2018 that Sandhu had signed for Tasmania for the upcoming season, ending a five-year stint with New South Wales. Sandhu spent a couple of seasons with Tasmania, before moving to Queensland.

Signed for Sussex CCC for June/July 2025.

=== International career ===
Sandhu played for the Australia Under-19 cricket team in the 2012 Under-19 Cricket World Cup.

Sandhu made his senior international debut for Australia in a One Day International against India at the Melbourne Cricket Ground in January 2015. He had limited success in the series and played no further games for Australia.
