= List of sporting clubs in Adelaide =

The following sports clubs are in Adelaide, the capital of South Australia.

== Athletics ==
- Adelaide University Athletics Club
- Adelaide Eagles Little Athletics Club
- Flinders Athletics Club

== Australian rules football ==
=== Australian Football League (AFL) ===
- Adelaide Crows
- Port Adelaide Football Club

=== South Australian National Football League (SANFL) ===
- Adelaide Croweaters
- Central District Bulldogs
- Glenelg Football Club
- North Adelaide Roosters
- Norwood Football Club
- Port Adelaide Football Club
- South Adelaide Football Club
- Sturt Football Club
- West Adelaide Football Club
- Woodville-West Torrens Football Club

=== Adelaide Footy League ===
- Adelaide University Football Club
- Broadview Football Club
- Gepps Cross Football Club
- Henley Football Club
- Modbury Football Club
- Port District Football Club
- Salisbury North
- GAZA, Premiers 2011
- Goodwood Saints
- Edwardstown Football Club
- Smithfield Football Club
- Portland Football Club
- Rosewater Football Club
- Golden Grove Football Club
- Kenilworth Football Club
- Unley Jets Football Club
- Plympton Football Club
- Prince Alfred Old Collegians Football Club
- Sacred Heart Old Collegians Football Club
- PHOS Camden Football Club
- North Haven Football Club
- Kilburn Football Club
- Brighton Football Club
- Marion Football Club

St Peter's old collegians

== Badminton ==
- Badminton Veterans Association of South Australia
- Flinders University Badminton Club
- Glenelg Badminton Club
- Ranges Badminton Club
- PAOC Badminton Club
- St Peter's Old Collegians Badminton Club
- Sturt Badminton Club

== Baseball ==
- Adelaide Giants (Australian Baseball League)

=== South Australian Baseball League ===
- Adelaide Baseball Club
- Adelaide University Baseball Club
- East Torrens Baseball Club
- Glenelg Baseball Club
- Golden Grove Central Districts Baseball Club
- Goodwood Baseball Club
- Henley & Grange Baseball Club
- Kensington Baseball Club
- Northern Districts Baseball Club
- Playford City Baseball Club
- Port Adelaide Baseball Club
- Southern Districts Baseball Club
- Sturt Baseball Club
- West Torrens Baseball Club
- Woodville District Baseball Club

== Softball ==
- South Australia Stars (national softball league)

Softball South Australia

west beach competition

- Port Adelaide Softball Club
- West Torrens Softball club
- Sturt Softball Club
- Walkerville Softball Club
- Seacombe Softball Club
- Glenelg Softball Club

== Basketball ==
- Adelaide Lightning (Women's National Basketball League)
- Adelaide 36ers (National Basketball League)
- South Australian Defence Basketball (Australian Defence Basketball Association)

=== NBL1 Central Division ===
- Central Districts Lions
- Eastern Mavericks
- Norwood Flames
- North Adelaide Rockets
- Forestville Eagles
- Sturt Sabres
- Southern Tigers
- West Adelaide Bearcats
- South Adelaide Panthers
- Woodville Warriors

=== Other District (Central Division) Basketball Clubs ===
- UniSA Basketball
- University of Adelaide
- Western Magic
- Torrens Valley Cougars

== Cricket ==
- Adelaide Strikers (Big Bash League), (Women's Big Bash League)
- West End Redbacks (Sheffield Shield, Marsh One Day Cup)
- South Australian Scorpions (Women's National Cricket League)

=== South Australian Grade Cricket League (SACA) ===
- Adelaide Cricket Club
- Adelaide University Cricket Club
- East Torrens Cricket Club
- Glenelg Cricket Club
- Kensington Cricket Club
- Northern Districts Cricket Club
- Port Adelaide Cricket Club
- Prospect Cricket Club
- Southern Districts Cricket Club
- Sturt Cricket Club
- Tea Tree Gully Cricket Club
- West Torrens Cricket Club
- Woodville Cricket Club

=== Adelaide Turf Cricket Association (ATCA) ===
- Goodwood Roos Cricket Club
- Reynella Cricket Club
- Marion Cricket Club
- Unley Cricket Club
- Brighton Cricket Club

== Croquet ==
=== South Australian Croquet Association ===
- Aldinga Bay Croquet Club
- Brighton Croquet Club Inc
- Coobowie Croquet Club
- Coromandel Valley Croquet Club
- Crystal Brook Croquet Club
- Glenunga Croquet Club
- Holdfast Bay Bowls and Croquet Club
- Hyde Park Croquet Club Inc
- Kadina Croquet Club
- Meningie Croquet Club
- Millicent Croquet Club
- Millswood Croquet Club Inc
- Moonta Croquet Club Inc
- Mount Barker Croquet Club Inc
- Murray Bridge Croquet Club
- Naracoorte Croquet Club
- North Adelaide Croquet Club
- Norwood Croquet Club Inc
- Penola Croquet Club
- Port Pirie Croquet Club
- Salisbury Croquet Club
- South Terrace Croquet Club
- Tea Tree Gully Croquet Club
- The ETSA Bowling and Croquet Club
- Tumby Bay Croquet Club
- Victor Harbor Croquet Club Inc
- Wallaroo Coronation Croquet Club
- West Lakes Croquet Club
- Woodville Croquet Club

== Soccer ==
- Adelaide United FC (A-League, W-League football (soccer))
- Adelaide City (FFSA Super League)
- Croydon Kings (FFSA Super League)
- Cumberland United Womens FC (FFSA Women's Premier League )
- Cumberland United FC (FFSA Premier League )
- West Adelaide (FFSA State League)
- Port Adelaide Lion Soccer Club (The Pirates) (FFSA Premier League, football (soccer))

== Dragon Boating ==
- Adelaide Phoenix Dragon Boat Club

== Fishing ==
- Adelaide Game Fishing Club
- Game Fishing Club of South Australia
- Western Districts Angling Club

== Golf ==
- Royal Adelaide Golf Club
- Glenelg Golf Club
- Kooyonga Golf Club
- North Adelaide Golf Course
- [Westlakes Golf Club
- [Grange Golf Club

== Hockey ==
- Adelaide hockey club
- Adelaide University Hockey Club
- Burnside Hockey Club
- Forestville hockey club
- Grange Royals Hockey Club
- Enfield Hockey Club
- North East Hockey Club
- Port Adelaide District Hockey Club
- Seacliff Hockey Club
- St. Peters Old Collegians Hockey Club
- University of South Australia Hockey Club
- Woodville Hockey Club

== Horse racing ==
- South Australian Jockey Club

== Ice hockey ==
- Adelaide Adrenaline
- Adelaide Rush
- Adelaide Generals

== Netball ==
=== National level ===
Super Netball

- Adelaide Thunderbirds

Australian Netball League

- Southern Force

=== State level ===
Netball South Australia Premier League

Team	Home city/town/suburb	Founded
Contax Netball Club	Woodville	1952
Garville Netball Club	Woodville Gardens/Woodville	1952
Matrics Netball Club	Elizabeth	1972
Metro Jets	Woodville	1995
Newton Jaguars Netball Club	Paradise	
Oakdale Netball Club	Oaklands/Warradale	1962
South Adelaide Netball Club	Blackwood	1999
Tango Netball Club	City of Tea Tree Gully	1946

== Rowing ==
=== Rowing SA ===
- Adelaide Rowing Club
- Adelaide University Boat Club
- Riverside Rowing Club
- Torrens Rowing Club

== Rugby league ==
=== National Rugby League ===
- Adelaide Rams

=== South Australian Rugby League ===
==== SARL Clubs ====
- Central Districts Roosters
- Cougars
- Para Districts Eels
- Henley Raiders
- Northern Districts Dragons
- River City Knights
- South Adelaide Bulldogs
- Spencer Gulf Titans
- Glenelg Tigers RLFC

== Rugby union ==
=== South Australian Rugby Union ===
==== SA Club Rugby ====
- Adelaide University Rugby Union Football Club
- Barossa Rams RUFC
- Brighton RUFC
- Burnside RUFC
- Elizabeth RUFC
- North East Districts RUFC
- North Torrens RUFC
- Old Collegians Rugby Club
- Onkaparinga Rugby Union Football Club
- Port Adelaide RUFC
- Souths Suburbs RUFC
- Woodville RUFC

== Korfball ==
- North Adelaide Korfball Club
- Adelaide Boomers Korfball Club
- Glenelg Korfball Club
- Arista Marion Korfball Club
- Flinders University Korfball Club

== See also ==
- Sport in South Australia
