= Alex Carey =

Australian cricketer (born 1991)

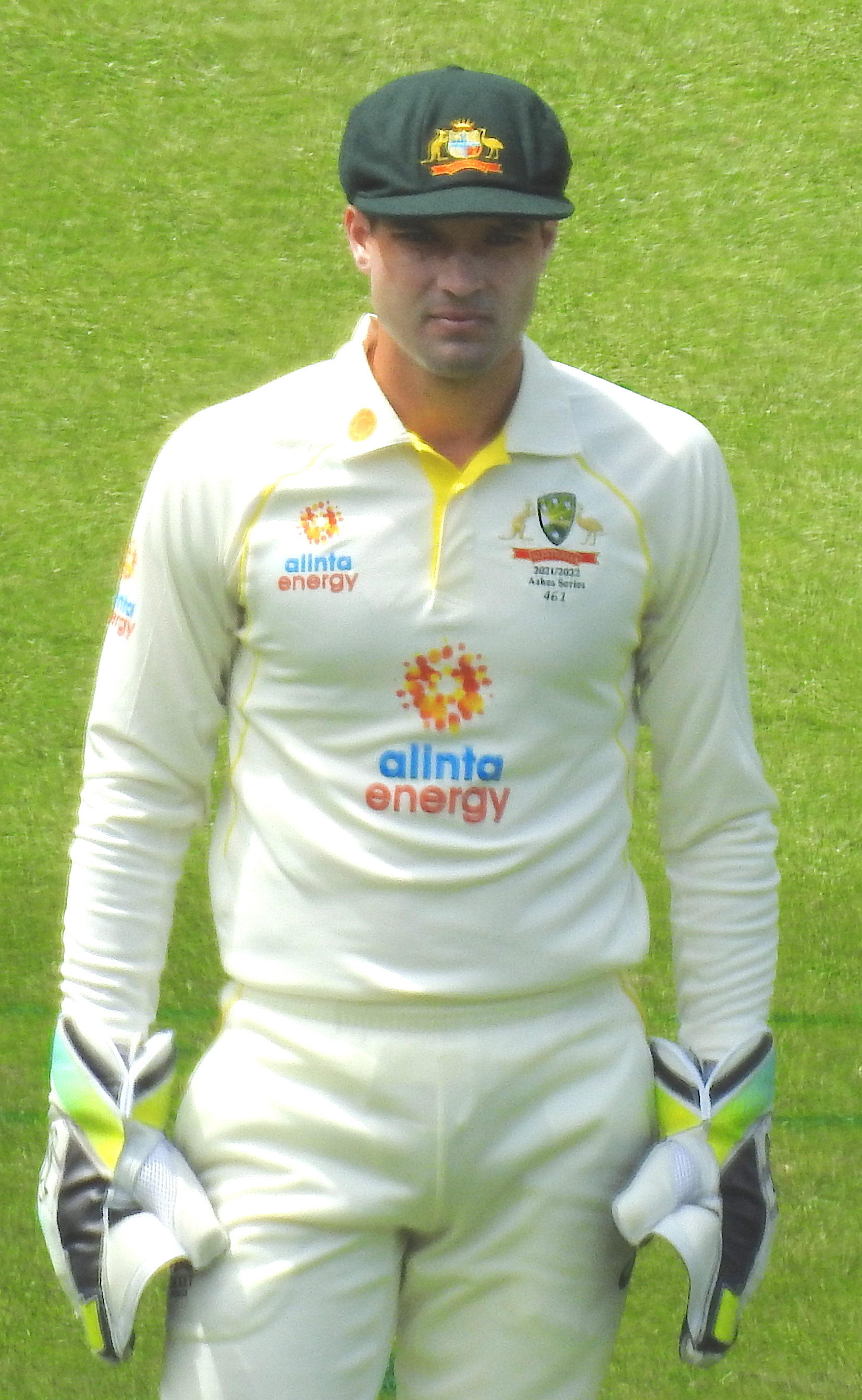
- Carey in 2021

Personal information
- Full name: Alex Tyson Carey
- Born: 27 August 1991 (age 35); Loxton, South Australia
- Nickname: Kez
- Height: 182 cm (6 ft 0 in)
- Batting: Left-handed
- Role: Wicket-keeper-batter

International information
- National side: Australia (2018–present)
- Test debut (cap 461): 8 December 2021 v England
- Last Test: 27 October 2026 v South Africa
- ODI debut (cap 223): 19 January 2018 v England
- Last ODI: 30 September 2026 v South Africa
- ODI shirt no.: 4
- T20I debut (cap 89): 3 February 2018 v New Zealand
- Last T20I: 4 October 2025 v New Zealand
- T20I shirt no.: 4

Domestic team information
- Years: Team
- 2012/13–present: South Australia
- 2016/17–present: Adelaide Strikers
- 2019: Sussex
- 2020: Delhi Capitals
- 2025: Islamabad United

Career statistics
Competition	Test	ODI	FC	LA
Matches	53	96	116	150
Runs scored	2,544	2,523	6,610	4,373
Batting average	34.84	33.64	37.98	34.70
100s/50s	3/14	1/14	13/35	3/28
Top score	156	106	156	128*
Catches/stumpings	201/20	102/10	448/26	164/14
Medal record
Men's cricket
Representing Australia
ICC Cricket World Cup
Winner	2023 India
ICC World Test Championship
Winner	2021–2023
Runner-up	2023–2025
- Source: ESPNcricinfo, 1 November 2026

Alex Tyson Carey (born 27 August 1991) is an Australian international cricketer who plays for the Australian national team as a wicket-keeper-batter. Formerly an Australian rules footballer, Carey has captained Australia in ODI cricket and has served as a vice-captain in Tests, ODIs and T20Is. In domestic cricket, he plays for South Australia and Adelaide Strikers. He was the captain of the Greater Western Sydney Giants in 2010, but when they joined the Australian Football League in 2012, he was left out of the squad and returned to his home state of South Australia, where he began to play domestic cricket.

Carey initially made his domestic debut as a specialist top-order batter in 2013, but was unsuccessful and dropped. He moved down the batting order and became a wicket-keeper. Carey was a member of the Australian teams that won the 2023 Cricket World Cup and the 2023 ICC World Test Championship final.

== Football career ==
As a teenager, Carey played both Australian rules football and cricket, and as he got older, he started to play football at a higher level, playing for Glenelg in the South Australian National Football League (SANFL) reserves competition alongside adults by the time he was 15. In 2008, Carey was included in South Australia's squad for the 2008 AFL Under 18 Championships, but he did not play any game. He was also in the AIS/AFL Academy intake for 2008. He continued to advance in 2009 and played for South Australia in the 2009 AFL Under 18 Championships in addition to winning the SANFL reserves premiership with Glenelg.

Carey turned down a rookie contract offer from the South Australian Cricket Association and moved to Sydney in 2010 to join the Australian Football League's (AFL) new expansion club, the Greater Western Sydney Giants, who were playing in the TAC Cup for the season to prepare for their entry into the AFL in 2012. Carey captained the team, who made it to the finals and, despite missing the final four rounds due to injury, won the team's best and fairest award. He played for them again in 2011 in the North East Australian Football League, but he wasn't given a place in their inaugural AFL squad for the 2012 season and returned to Adelaide.

== Cricket career ==
=== Domestic and T20 career ===
When Carey returned to Adelaide, he initially intended to return to the Glenelg Football Club, but he decided to switch sports and went back into grade cricket with the Glenelg Cricket Club for the 2012–13 season. He started out as a specialist batter and averaged close to 50 for Glenelg in all formats. His form warranted his first call-up to represent South Australia. He made his List A cricket debut in a Ryobi Cup match against New South Wales and was also brought into the Sheffield Shield team, making his first-class debut. He played three Shield matches and averaged only 10.1 in six batting innings as he was dropped from the team.

Carey was given a rookie contract with South Australia for the 2013–14 season, though he didn't play a game for the state team during the season. After his failures as a top-order batter, he became a wicket-keeper and moved down the batting order. This resulted in him being able to play several matches for South Australia in the Futures League. His breakout season came in 2015–16, when he scored 822 runs at an average of 90.22 in 10 matches for Glenelg, including big scores of 195 against Adelaide and 151 against West Torrens. In the Futures League, he averaged 44.13 in his five matches, so he was called up to play for South Australia again in the final four rounds of the 2015–16 Sheffield Shield season, replacing experienced wicket-keeper Tim Ludeman, including an appearance in the Sheffield Shield final.

For the 2016–17 season, Carey was given his first senior contract with South Australia. This season was by far his most successful yet, as he became just the fourth player to record 500 runs with the bat and 50 dismissals as a wicket-keeper in a single Sheffield Shield season after Chris Hartley, Matthew Wade and Adam Gilchrist. During the Sheffield Shield final, he took his 59th dismissal of the tournament, a record for wicket-keeper in a single Sheffield Shield season. His improvement resulted in his inclusion in Australia's National Performance Squad in the 2017 off-season, and he was also named as the sole wicket-keeper in the Australia A squad which was meant to tour South Africa for the 2017 South Africa A Team Tri-Series. He was chosen ahead of former Test keepers Peter Nevill and Tim Paine, indicating he was the next in line to replace Matthew Wade in the Australian Test team if Wade became injured.

Carey started the 2017–18 season playing in the JLT Cup for South Australia, coming close to a maiden century when he scored 92 against Victoria in the elimination final as part of South Australia's fourth-biggest one-day partnership of all time, putting on 212 runs with Jake Weatherald. As a result of his selection for Australia A and one-day form, Carey went into the 2017–18 Sheffield Shield season as one of the main contenders to play for Australia in the 2017–18 Ashes series. Though he had only played 18 first-class matches prior to the start of the season, Carey was considered the best young wicket-keeper in Australia. He had an opportunity to score runs and impress selectors in the first two matches, but he failed to score above fifty before the squad was named, coming close when he scored 46 not out before being stranded without any partners left against Western Australia. He was overlooked for the team, with Tim Paine being chosen instead. Despite his failure to make it into the national team, Carey scored his maiden first-class century when he made 139 for South Australia against Queensland.

In May 2019, Carey was signed by Sussex County Cricket Club to play in the 2019 t20 Blast tournament in England. In the 2020 IPL auction, he was bought by the Delhi Capitals ahead of the 2020 Indian Premier League.

During the 2023–24 Marsh One-Day Cup, Carey equalled the record for the most dismissals by a wicket-keeper in a List A match, taking eight catches against Queensland.

Carey scored a hundred in the fourth innings of the 2024-25 Sheffield Shield final against Queensland at Karen Rolton Oval, to help guide South Australia to the target of 270 and in doing so, achieving their first Sheffield Shield title in 29 years.

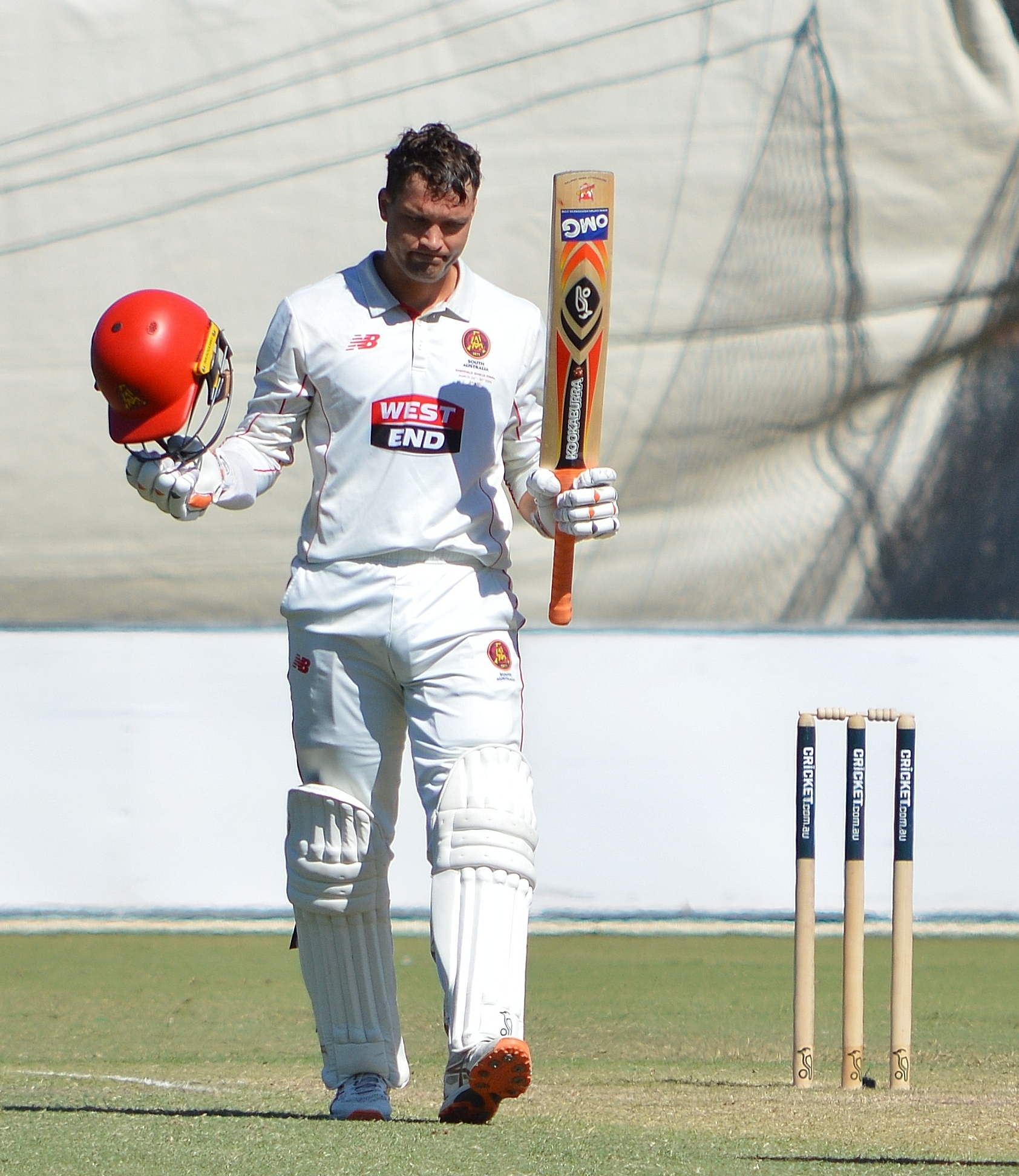
Alex Carey celebrates a century on day four of the Sheffield Shield Final in March 2026

In next Sheffield Shield season, in the Final against Victoria, Carey once again came up clutch for South Australia, putting up a dominant 103 in South Australia's second innings, leading South Australia to a win, winning by 56 runs, and their first back-to-back titles since the competition started.

=== International career ===
Carey's 2017–18 Big Bash League season form saw him make his One Day International (ODI) debut for Australia, replacing an ill Tim Paine on 19 January 2018. Later the same month, he was named in Australia's Twenty20 International (T20I) squad for the 2017–18 Trans-Tasman Tri-Series, which started in February 2018. He made his T20I debut for Australia against New Zealand on 3 February 2018.

In April 2018, Carey was awarded a national contract by Cricket Australia for the 2018–19 season. On 8 May 2018, he was named vice-captain of the Australia T20 team. In April 2019, he was named in Australia's squad for the 2019 Cricket World Cup. He scored 375 runs from 10 matches and was Australia's 4th highest run scorer during the World Cup, behind Steve Smith, Aaron Finch and David Warner. He also set the record for most catches by a wicket-keeper in a single edition of the World Cup, with 18 catches. He also stumped two batsmen to take his tally to an overall 20 dismissals. Following the World Cup, the International Cricket Council (ICC) named Carey as the rising star of the squad. He was named as wicket-keeper in the 'Team of the Tournament' for the 2019 World Cup by the ICC.

On 16 July 2020, Carey was named in a 26-man preliminary squad of players to begin training ahead of a possible tour to England following the COVID-19 pandemic. On 14 August 2020, Cricket Australia confirmed that the fixtures would be taking place, with Carey included in the touring party. Carey played in the first two T20I matches as wicket-keeper, but was dropped for the third in favour of Matthew Wade. Wade remained Australia's T20I wicket-keeper through the rest of 2020 and 2021, although Carey played some T20I matches as a batter. Carey remained as Australia's ODI wicket-keeper, and played all three ODIs of the 2020 England tour. In the third ODI of the tour, on 16 September 2020, Carey scored his maiden ODI century, with 106 off 114 deliveries. He shared a partnership of 212 runs with Glenn Maxwell for the sixth wicket and helped Australia win the match by 3 wickets.

In July 2021, Carey was named as Australia's captain for Australia's 1st ODI against West Indies in the absence of Aaron Finch who was suffering from a knee injury at the time. It was the first time Carey was named as Australia's ODI captain after already being vice captain of the team. Australia won the 1st ODI under his captaincy by 133 runs and Carey also completed 1000 ODI runs and 50 ODI catches in the match.

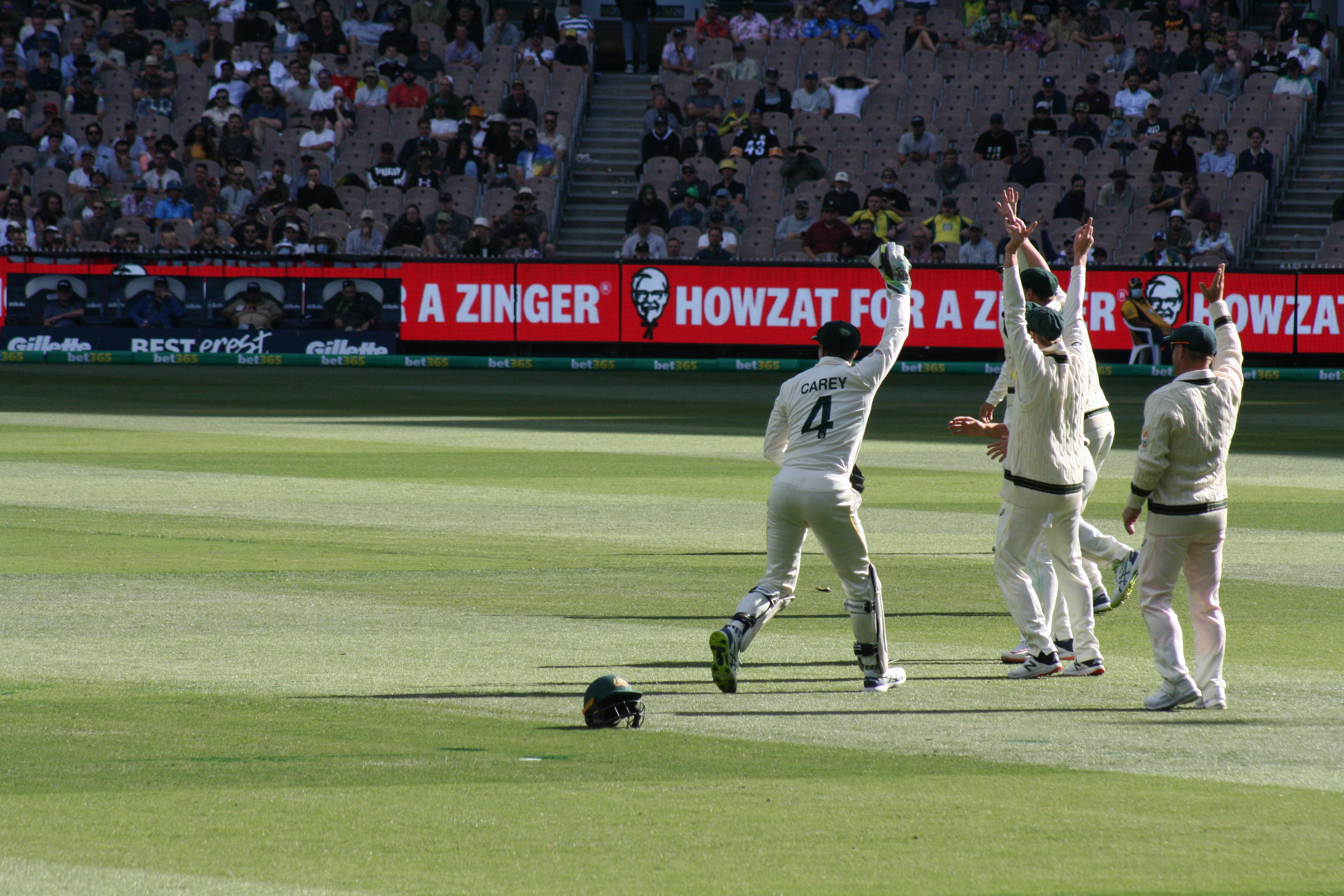
Appeal made by Carey and the slips cordon during the second day of the 2021 Boxing Day Test

Carey made his Test debut on 8 December 2021, in the first Test of the 2021–22 Ashes series. He was chosen as the wicket-keeper for the first two Tests of the series, after Tim Paine stepped down from the Test team. Carey's baggy green cap was presented to him by Adam Gilchrist. Carey equalled the most catches by a wicket-keeper on Test debut, with eight catches. Carey was selected for Australia's 2022 tour of Pakistan and played in 3 tests and 3 ODIs. In the first innings of the first test, Carey scored 19 runs off of 43 balls. Australia did not bat a second time, and the match was drawn. In the first innings of the second test, Carey scored 93 off of 159 balls, before being bowled by Pakistani captain, Babar Azam. Carey did not bat during the second innings and the match was drawn. This was his highest score and was one run higher than previous Australian captain and wicketkeeper, Tim Paine, who had a high score of 92. In the first innings of the third and final test, Carey scored 67 runs off of 105 balls and helped Australia reach a total of 391 runs. Carey did not bat in the second innings and Australia won the match by 115 runs and won the 3 match series 1–0. Carey finished the test series with 179 runs from 3 innings, with a high score of 93 and an average of 59.66, which was the second highest on the Australian team.

In December 2022, Carey scored his maiden Test century during the Boxing Day Test against South Africa, becoming only the second wicketkeeper (after Rod Marsh) to score a century at the MCG, and the first Australian wicketkeeper to score a Test century since Brad Haddin in 2013.

In June 2023, Carey played in the World Test Championship Final, contributing 48 runs in the first innings and a vital 66* in the second. During the 2023 Ashes, Carey was involved in a controversial stumping with England batter Jonny Bairstow. The incident was widely covered in the UK press, being featured on several front pages. Following a bouncer from Cameron Green, Bairstow, assuming that the over had been called and that the ball was dead walked out of his crease whilst the ball was still live. Carey having spotted this on earlier deliveries immediately threw down the stumps after catching the ball. The decision was referred to the third umpire and given out in accordance with the laws of the game. The stumping received mixed reactions, with praise coming from former England captains Michael Atherton, Nasser Hussain, Eoin Morgan and Indian cricketer Ravichandran Ashwin. While the stumping was criticised by Geoffrey Boycott and the England leadership of Ben Stokes and Brendon McCullum.

Carey was named in the ICC Men's Test Team of the Year for 2023, being named as the wicket keeper.

In March 2024, during the second test against New Zealand, Carey equalled Adam Gilchrist's record for the most catches in a match by an Australian wicket-keeper with 10. In the second innings of the test, he scored a match-winning innings of 98*, allowing Australia to chase 279 and earning him Player of the Match.

In February 2025, Carey scored his second Test century and highest first-class score, hitting 156 from 188 balls during the second Test against Sri Lanka. It became the highest score achieved by an Australian wicket-keeper in Asia, surpassing Adam Gilchrist's 144.

Carey was the second highest run scorer for Australia in the 2025–26 Ashes series with 323 runs which included his third test century, a 106 at the Adelaide Oval. Carey also took 28 dismissals, the joint-second highest for any wicket-keeper in a test series. Throughout the series, Carey often went up to the stumps when facing pace bowling of over 130 km/h in order to prevent English batters from leaving their crease and scoring fast. This tactic, while dangerous, proved effective, garnering appreciation and praise from many cricket fans and commentators.

== Personal life ==
Carey's father, Gordon, died in September 2025 from leukemia. He had been both a cricket and football coach in South Australia.
