= Hurtle Willsmore =

Australian rules footballer and cricketer

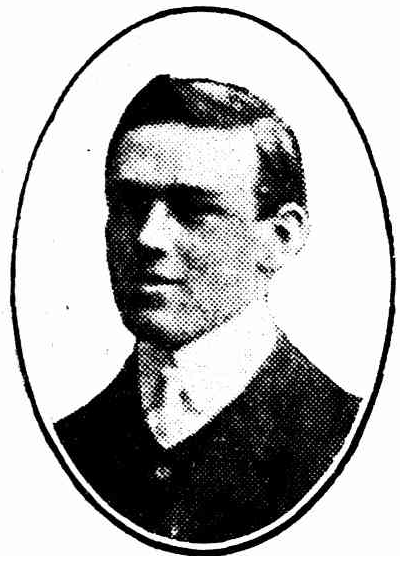

Personal information
- Full name: Hurtle Binks Willsmore
- Born: 26 December 1889; Beverley, South Australia
- Died: 17 September 1985 (aged 95); King's Park, South Australia
- Batting: Right-handed
- Bowling: Right-arm legspin
- Role: Bowler

Domestic team information
- Years: Team
- 1913/14–1920/21: South Australia

Career statistics
Competition	First-class
Matches	9
Runs scored	271
Batting average	16.93
100s/50s	0/1
Top score	57
Balls bowled	874
Wickets	16
Bowling average	32.87
5 wickets in innings	0
10 wickets in match	0
Best bowling	4/65
Catches/stumpings	7/–
- Source: Cricket Archive, 3 September 2015

Hurtle Binks Willsmore (26 December 1889 – 17 September 1985) was a South Australian first-class cricketer and Australian rules footballer for West Torrens Football Club.

== Early life ==
The son of George Arthur Willsmore, a general carrier, and Elizabeth (née Jeanes), Willsmore was the youngest of eight children with two sisters and five brothers.

Willsmore attended Prince Alfred College where, as a hard-hitting right-handed batsman and right arm leg spin bowler, he captained the first XI in 1907 and 1908, and then studied at the University of Adelaide, graduating with a Bachelor of Science in December 1916.

== Sporting career ==
An all-round sportsman, Willsmore made his South Australian Football League (SAFL) debut in 1908 for West Torrens Football Club while still a schoolboy, playing as a centre-half back for three seasons.

After graduating from Prince Alfred College, Willsmore joined South Australian Grade Cricket League club West Torrens for the 1908/09 season, and in his first match, against Glenelg, made 161 not out. Willsmore led the West Torrens batting averages throughout the season. The next year Willsmore transferred to Adelaide University Cricket Club, which he captained, as well as vice-captaining the University's football club.

Willsmore made his first-class debut for South Australia on 16 January 1914, against the touring New Zealand cricket team at the Adelaide Oval, scoring 57 (his highest first-class score) and eight, and taking one wicket for thirty eight runs (1/38) and 1/46. On the strength of this performance, Willsmore was selected for his Sheffield Shield debut, for South Australia against Victoria at the Adelaide Oval, taking 4/65 in Victoria's second innings, which was to be his best first-class bowling figures. He was reportedly chosen to tour New Zealand with an Australian team but never received his letter of invitation.

Willsmore was chosen for all four of South Australia's first-class matches in the 1914/15 Australian domestic season, the last before the temporary cessation of first-class cricket due to the war. While preliminarily a batsman, Willsmore was also an effective leg-spin bowler, once taking 7/50 in a district match in 1914/15 against East Torrens. Around this time, a journalist wrote "Willsmore bowled splendidly. He flighted the slows with excellent judgment, and dropped them down on a fine length. Most of his runs were made from powerful straight drives."

Following the resumption of cricket at the end of World War I, Willsmore transferred to Adelaide grade club Sturt as captain and returned to the South Australian team. He played in their only first-class match of the 1918/19 season, against Victoria at the Melbourne Cricket Ground (MCG), but injured himself while fielding in the first thirty minutes and was substituted out of the match. In another case of injury-related bad luck, Willsmore was also forced to miss a match against New South Wales in 1919/20 when he had the webbing on his hand split open while fielding during a trial match earlier in the week.

Willsmore played two more first-class matches in the 1920/21 season before being omitted but continued to play for Sturt, including a match in the 1921/22 season against University when he hit each of the first seven deliveries he faced for six, and then boundaries from the next three, reaching his 50 from nine deliveries; an unbeatable record for the quickest half century in terms of deliveries faced. Referring to this innings, a journalist wrote "Hurtle Willsmore was a hard, but not wild hitter, and this demoralising burst of hitting was the result of perfectly timed strokes." Willsmore made 187, his highest score in district cricket.

Willsmore had his best club season in 1924/25, scoring three centuries and two half-centuries from seven innings but did not return to the South Australian side. He retired from Adelaide district cricket in 1929, having scored 5666 runs at 34.97 and taken 245 wickets at 22.66.

== Professional career ==
Following his university graduation, Willsmore was appointed inaugural senior master in mathematics and physics at Adelaide's then new Scotch College in January 1919. He also coached Scotch's cricket team and saw seven of his pupils play first-class cricket; the most famous being Australian captain Vic Richardson but he also coached Wayne B. Phillips and noted cricket writer Dick Whitington. Willsmore also initiated an annual cricket competition between Scotch, Hale School in Perth, Western Australia and Melbourne's Haileybury College.

Willsmore worked at Scotch until his retirement in 1957, in the process becoming "one of the great cornerstones" of the college. A history of Scotch College declared "Hurtle was one of the most popular masters to ever teach at Scotch, and renowned for his patience, whether working with a class of mathematicians or coaching a group of promising cricketers."

== Personal life ==
On 28 September 1915, Willsmore married Muriel Winifred Thomas at Woodville Methodist Church. Their daughter Christobel was born on 21 August 1918.

Willsmore died aged 95 on 17 September 1985 after a long illness. Muriel predeceased him but Willsmore was survived by Christobel, six grandchildren and four great-grandchildren.

== Sources ==
- Pollard, J. (1989) Australian Cricket - The Game and The Players, Angus and Robertson: Melbourne. ISBN 0 207 15269 1.
- Read, P. & Pouw-Bray, A. (2010) Ninety Years at Torrens Park: The Scotch College Story, Wakefield Press: Adelaide. ISBN 9781862548893.
- Sando, G. (1997) Grass Roots: 100 Years of Adelaide District Cricket 1897-1997, South Australian Cricket Association: Adelaide. ISBN 1 86254 435 2.
