= Albert Bartlett (cricketer) =

Australian cricketer

Personal information
- Full name: Albert James Bartlett
- Born: 23 April 1900; Adelaide, South Australia
- Died: 6 October 1968 (aged 68); Woodville, South Australia
- Batting: Right-handed
- Role: Batsman

Domestic team information
- Years: Team
- 1925/26: South Australia

Career statistics
Competition	First-class
Matches	1
Runs scored	11
Batting average	11.00
100s/50s	0/0
Top score	7
Catches/stumpings	1/–
- Source: Cricinfo, 24 April 2018

Albert James Bartlett (23 April 1900 – 6 October 1968) was an Australian cricketer who played grade cricket for Sturt Cricket Club in the 1920s. He was a successful batsman for the team and played for South Australia's colts team for several seasons. He played one first-class match for South Australia in November 1925.

== Early life and family ==
Bartlett was the middle of three brothers, who all attended Unley High School. Bartlett showed promise as a cricket player very early, playing in the school's first eleven while only 12 years old. After leaving school, he played club cricket first for Malvern United and then for Kenilworth in the Adelaide and Suburban Association, where both of his brothers also played. His older brother, J. V. Bartlett, played at Kenilworth alongside Vic Richardson.

== Grade cricket ==
Bartlett played grade cricket for Sturt beginning in the 1920–21 season. He played the first half of the season with the B grade team and was promoted to the A grade team for the second half, becoming Sturt's player number 130. then scoring a century in just his third first-eleven game, scoring 110 runs not out against East Torrens. In the 1921–22 season, despite playing half the season for Sturt's B grade team again, he led the batting averages for the A grade team with 61.4. He played every game at A grade 1922–23 season, when he topped the team's batting averages with 85.8, and he was then the third-highest run-scorer in all of A grade the following season with 601 runs.

Bartlett was part of the Sturt team that won the A grade premiership in the 1924–25 season by defeating University in the final in April 1925. Bartlett was again Sturt's best batter of the season with 601 runs at an average of 85.85, scoring three centuries and winning the club's batting trophy.

Bartlett won Sturt's A grade batting trophy again in the 1926–27 season. By 1929, Bartlett had scored centuries against every A grade team in South Australia except for West Torrens. In an A grade semi-final in March 1929, all three Bartlett brothers played together for Sturt against Port Adelaide, the first time that three brothers had played together in an A grade cricket match.

Bartlett was a life member of the Sturt Cricket Club.

== State cricket ==
Bartlett's strong form in grade cricket meant that he featured for South Australia's colts team for several seasons, and was the team's top scorer four times. He played his first and only first-class match for South Australia against Western Australia, beginning on 21 November 1925. His batting performances in the match were unimpressive, with 7 runs in South Australia's first innings and 4 runs not out in their second.

== Playing style ==
Bartlett used a range of batting shots to score his runs. He scored the majority of his runs with the square cut and cover drive shots, but could score runs all around the wicket.
