= Patrick Ohlstrom =

Australian cricketer

Personal information
- Full name: Patrick Andreas Ohlstrom
- Born: 16 December 1890; Warooka, South Australia
- Died: 10 June 1940 (aged 49); Adelaide, South Australia
- Batting: Left-handed
- Bowling: Right-arm offspin
- Role: Bowler

Domestic team information
- Years: Team
- 1923/24: South Australia

Career statistics
Competition	First-class
Matches	1
Runs scored	4
Batting average	4.00
100s/50s	0/0
Top score	3
Balls bowled	56
Wickets	1
Bowling average	25.00
5 wickets in innings	0
10 wickets in match	0
Best bowling	1/25
Catches/stumpings	0/–
- Source: Cricinfo, 18 September 2020

Patrick Andreas Ohlstrom (16 December 1890 – 10 June 1940) was an Australian cricketer and baseballer. He played in one first-class cricket match for South Australia in 1923–24 and was selected to represent the Australia national baseball team in 1929 but was unable to make the trip.

== Biography ==
Born in Warooka in South Australia's Yorke Peninsula, the youngest of ten children to farmer Pohl Ohlstrom and Margaret Ann (nee Purtle), Ohlstrom attended Edithburgh Public School and played cricket and baseball as a youth. After leaving school at 14, Ohlstrom worked as a clerk in Edithburgh, before moving to Adelaide, where he played cricket for Glynde Cricket Club and as the star pitcher for Freemason Ramblers, one of the leading baseball teams in South Australia at the time.

=== World War I ===
Ohlstrom enlisted in the Australian Imperial Force (AIF) on 23 June 1915 as a Corporal with the 32nd Infantry Battalion B Company and embarked from Adelaide for Egypt on the HMAT A2 Geelong on 18 November 1915.

The 32nd Infantry Battalion B Company was initially intended to join the Gallipoli campaign but troops were already withdrawing from the area by the time the HMAT A2 Geelong arrived in Egypt. After time spent guarding the Suez Canal, the Battalion was sent to the Western Front instead, where Ohlstrom was promoted to 2nd Lieutenant on 1 December 1917 and Lieutenant on 14 June 1918. Severely wounded in a gas attack in May 1918, Ohlstrom was recuperating in Britain when he visited Glamis Castle in August 1918, where he played tennis against Lady Elizabeth Bowes-Lyon. The two collided at the net and Bowes-Lyon collapsed in a heap.

Awarded the 1914-15 Star, the British War Medal and the Victory Medal, Ohlstrom returned to Australia on 28 February 1919.

=== Sporting career ===
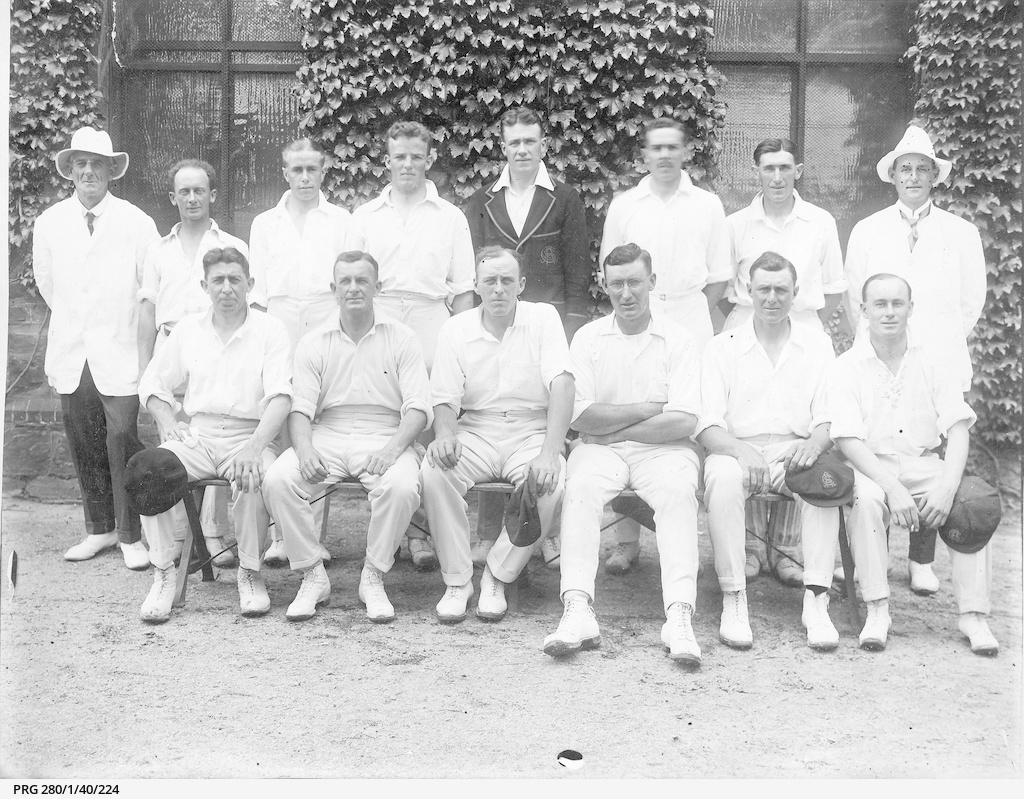
The South Australian team which played New South Wales at Adelaide Oval from 14 to 18 December 1923. Ohlstrom is standing, second from left.

Following his return to Australia, Ohlstrom appeared on local vaudeville stages with Billy Mack in the popular equilibristic act "Vernon and Mack", while studying law at the University of Adelaide. There he played cricket for Adelaide University Cricket Club and founded the Adelaide University Baseball Club in 1922, captaining it until 1924. Ohlstrom gained a baseball Blue in 1923 and a cricket Blue in 1924.

Gaining a reputation as a bowler with great accuracy and the ability to significantly swing the ball, Ohlstrom's good form for University in Adelaide district cricket led to his selection in the 1923/24 South Australian training squad and following efforts including taking 8 wickets for 15 (8/15) against Glenelg Cricket Club, a district record for best bowling in an innings until surpassed by Brian Richardson's 8/14 in 1939, made his first-class debut for South Australia against New South Wales at Adelaide Oval on 14 December 1923.

Batting at no. 11, Ohlstrom made 1* and 3, and took 1/25. Ohlstrom is unique in first-class cricket for being dismissed hit wicket in his only completed innings and having a hit wicket as his only wicket.

In baseball Ohlstrom represented South Australia from 1923 to 1935, as captain from 1927 to 1935, formed the Kensington Baseball Club in 1926, captaining it from 1926 to 1935, and was a state selector from 1927 to 1937. Described as "a light and joyous foot that between bases gives a brilliant exhibition that even Pavlova might envy", in 1929 Ohlstrom was selected as vice-captain of the Australian team to play a visiting American side in Sydney but was unable to make the trip. Ohlstrom retired from baseball in 1936.

In 1930, Ohlstrom represented Baseball South Australia on the cross-sport committee to determine the sporting colours of any official South Australian sporting team (the committee chose red, gold and blue).

In recognition of Ohlstrom's service to baseball, teams in the South Australian Baseball League compete for the Ohlstrom Memorial Shield.

Ohlstrom was also a member of the Kensington Gardens Bowling Club and the Amateur Sports Club.

=== Business and political career ===
Following his university graduation, Ohlstrom worked as a solicitor, becoming a partner in Edmunds, Jessop, Ward, and Ohlstrom in 1932, which later became Jessop, Ward, Ohlstrom, and Mollison.

Ohlstrom joined the Liberal Federation (which later became the Liberal and Country League (LCL)) in 1929, Ohlstrom served as Vice-President of the LCLs Glen Osmond and Eastwood Branch and was elected to Burnside Council in 1935, representing the East Adelaide and Glen Osmond Ward.

Ohlstrom was, at various times, President of the Australian Baseball Council, President and Secretary of the South Australian Baseball Association, President of the Glen Osmond Institute, President of the Parkside Branch of the Returned Soldiers' and Sailors' League (RSL), Secretary of the 32nd Battalion (AIF) Club, member of the Naval and Military Club, the Stock Exchange Club and the Amateur Sports Association.

=== Personal life ===
Ohlstrom became engaged to Leonore Haynes in September 1921 and were married on 3 December 1921 at St Francis Xavier's Cathedral in Adelaide.

Ohlstrom died aged 49 at an Adelaide private hospital on 10 June 1940, ten days after undergoing surgery. He was survived by Leonore.

In 1956 Leonore donated £300 to the University of Adelaide to establish an annual prize in German in memory of Ohlstrom. The Weimar-Ohlstrom Prize for German continues to be presented to the best Adelaide University student in German Studies.
