= Karl Quist =

Australian sportsman (1875–1957)

Personal information
- Full name: Karl Hugo Quist
- Born: 18 August 1875; Milsons Point, New South Wales, Australia
- Died: 31 March 1957 (aged 81); Plympton, South Australia, Australia
- Batting: Right-handed
- Bowling: Right-arm leg-break
- Role: All-rounder
- Relatives: Adrian Quist (son)

Domestic team information
- Years: Team
- 1899: New South Wales
- 1906: Western Australia
- 1908–1912: South Australia

Career statistics
Competition	First-class
Matches	10
Runs scored	296
Batting average	18.50
100s/50s	0/1
Top score	56
Balls bowled	523
Wickets	12
Bowling average	25.00
5 wickets in innings	0
10 wickets in match	0
Best bowling	4/33
Catches/stumpings	7/–
- Source: CricketArchive, 1 December 2012

Karl Hugo Quist (18 August 1875 – 31 March 1957) was an Australian sportsman who played interstate cricket for New South Wales, South Australia, and Western Australia, and later became a noted South Australian sporting coach and personality.

Born in Milsons Point, a suburb of Sydney, to Danish emigrant parents, Quist played Sydney grade cricket for both the North Sydney and Sydney Cricket Clubs, captaining the latter side for a period of time. He made his first-class debut for New South Wales during the 1899–1900 season, in a match against Tasmania at the Tasmanian Cricket Association Ground in Hobart, and scored 25 and 3* in what was to be his only match for New South Wales.

Quist left for Fremantle, Western Australia, in April 1905, to take up a position with an electrical engineering firm. In WACA district cricket, he took up playing for the Fremantle District Cricket Club, and was subsequently appointed to the state selection committee for South Australia's tour during the 1905–06 season. Elected captain of the state team, Western Australia won the first match by 103 runs, with Quist thus becoming the first person to captain Western Australia to a win in a first-class match. In the second match, which was drawn, he scored 56 runs in Western Australia's second innings, his only first-class half-century and highest first-class score.

Quist moved to South Australia, later in 1906, and entered into partnership with A. S. Toms, who owned an Adelaide sporting goods store (originally established by Joe Darling). In South Australian district cricket, Quist began to play for Glenelg. He was an irregular selection for South Australia in both Sheffield Shield and other interstate matches, playing a total of seven games for the state from the 1908–09 to the 1911–12 seasons. This included three matches against Western Australia during a tour of the state in the second half of the 1908–09 season. Bowling leg breaks, Quist took eight wickets—4/35 and 4/33—during the first first-class match of the tour, the only time he took more than one wicket in a match. Having become sole proprietor of his store in early 1914, Quist also served as a cricket coach in a number of schools and clubs around Australia, including the Sydney Church of England Grammar School, Prince Alfred College, and Christian Brothers' College, and the Adelaide, Glenelg, Adelaide University and North Adelaide Cricket Clubs. He would also occasionally call interstate cricket on 5CL, or write columns for The Advertiser.

Quist died at his home in Plympton in March 1957. His son, Adrian Quist, was one of the best tennis players in Australia during the 1930s and 1940s, winning the Australian Championships singles titles in 1936, 1940, and 1948, and a total of 14 Grand Slam doubles titles.

== See also ==
- List of Western Australia cricket captains
- List of Western Australia first-class cricketers
