= Norman Walsh (cricketer) =

Australian cricketer (1902–1969)

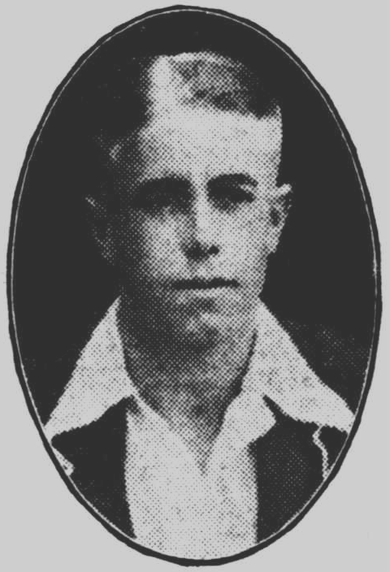

Personal information
- Full name: Norman Arthur Walsh
- Born: 8 February 1902; North Adelaide, South Australia
- Died: 7 December 1969 (aged 67); Adelaide, South Australia
- Height: 5 ft 9 in (1.75 m)
- Batting: Right-handed
- Relatives: Laurence Walsh (twin brother)

Domestic team information
- Years: Team
- 1923/24–1925/26: South Australia

Career statistics
Competition	First-class
Matches	9
Runs scored	242
Batting average	15.12
100s/50s	0/0
Top score	34*
Balls bowled	40
Wickets	1
Bowling average	39.00
5 wickets in innings	0
10 wickets in match	0
Best bowling	1/25
Catches/stumpings	5/–
- Source: Cricinfo, 29 May 2020

Norman Arthur Walsh (8 February 1902 – 7 December 1969) was an Australian cricketer. He played nine first-class matches for South Australia between 1923 and 1925. He played district cricket from 1922 to 1937 representing Sturt, Colts, and University.

== Personal life ==
Walsh's father was Frederick Walsh, a well-known tailor in Adelaide. He had a twin brother, Laurence, who also played first-class cricket for South Australia. In 1930 Norman married Gwendoline Spinkston, with Laurence acting as best man at the wedding, and they had a daughter, Elizabeth, in 1936.

In his career Walsh worked for the Vacuum Oil Company, Proprietary Limited. He enlisted in the Australian Imperial Force in Adelaide in 1940, was serving as a Lieutenant by 1944, and was discharged in January 1945.

== Cricket career ==
=== Early promise ===
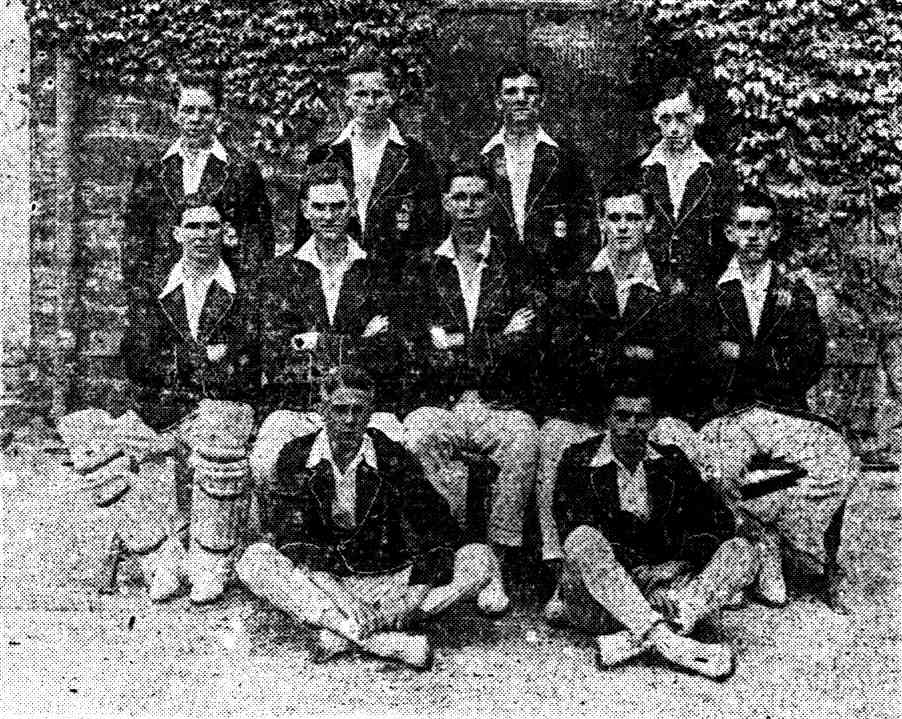
P.A.C. Intercollegiate champion side. Walsh is at front on left.

Walsh began his cricket career after enrolling at Prince Alfred College in 1912, playing for the College side and becoming well-known, being part of the side which won the 1918 Intercollegiate Cricket competition. He captained the College team for the 1919–20 and 1920-21 seasons. He was a pace bowler for the college side, and took 5 for 13 and 5 for 14 in a B grade district game for the College against Port Adelaide, but also became known for his batting when he scored a 106 for the College in a B Grade district game against West Torrens in November 1921. He also played for the Prince Alfred tennis team, as did his twin brother who was also a cricketer.

In the last game of the 1921-22 district season Walsh played for University, and in April 1922 he was selected for a team representing the South Australian A Grade Association in a match against a team representing Broken Hill in which he scored eight batting at number three and took 5 for 13 with the ball. In the 1922-23 season he began playing for Sturt and in November 1922 he was described as showing promise as a batsman albeit with a cramped style. In January a report on the 1922-23 season so far noted Walsh's aggressive approach had been appealing to spectators. Overall in the 1922-23 season he had a batting average of 26 and received the Sturt club Trophy for most promising junior.

He was selected in some developmental squads throughout the 1922-23 season in addition to playing for Sturt. In December 1922 he was selected for a South Australian junior side which played a Victorian junior side at the Adelaide Oval. In the fourth innings of the game, which South Australia lost by one run, Walsh scored just 32, but batted aggressively with a report noting that his innings was spectacular to watch. In late January he was invited to a net session by the South Australian Cricket Association which was to be used to determine selection of the state side, and in February he was selected to practice for the George Giffen Testimonial Match. In April 1923 he was again selected for a combined South Australian Cricket Association side which toured the South-East of the state.

At the start of the 1923-24 season a 'Colts' side for junior players was introduced to the district competition by the South Australian Cricket Association which was for players under 23 who had potential to become First-Class cricketers. Walsh was selected for the new Colts team rather than Sturt, although any juniors not selected for Colts in a round could also be selected for their club side. He scored 88 for the Colts against Sturt in the first game of the season, and 76 against Adelaide in the second with the first 50 runs being scored in 82 minutes. In November 1923 he was noted as being in consideration for selection in the South Australian side, described as the most promising junior South Australia had seen for some time, and selected for match practice ahead of the first Sheffield Shield game of the season.

=== State career ===
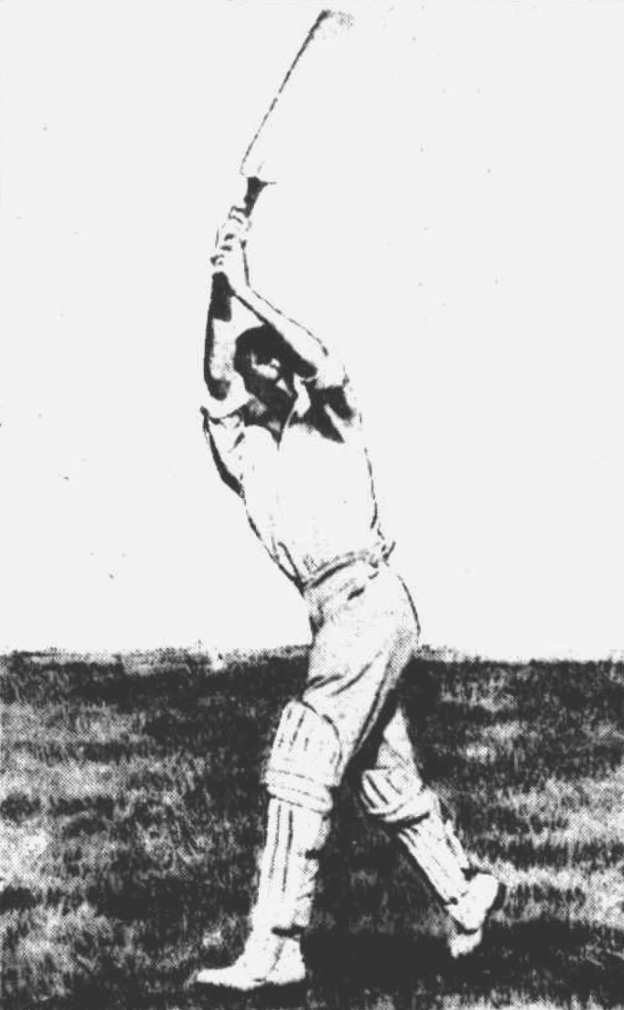
Walsh playing a shot, 1924.

On December 14, 1923, Walsh made his First-Class debut for South Australia against New South Wales at the Adelaide Oval and scored 2 and 3 on what was a wet wicket which required mopping before play and took one run out. Later in December he represented South Australia again in a non-Shield First-Class game against Queensland in Adelaide, with the selectors receiving praise for persisting with him, and scored 4 in South Australia's only innings and took a catch. He was twelfth-man for South Australia's games against Victoria at the M.C.G. and NSW in Sydney at the start of January. He returned to the playing XI against Victoria in Adelaide in February 1924 and improved his statistics with a 17 and 33 and another runout. After the First-Class season Walsh returned to playing for the Colts and represented them in the district semi-final, losing to Port Adelaide. In the off-season Walsh played for the Colts on another tour of the South-East, and in April 1924 he played in a novelty game between junior cricketers and retired veterans, including Ernie Jones, George Giffen, and Clem Hill, playing on the veterans team.

In the 1924-25 season he returned to Sturt, as players who had played two or more First-Class games were not allowed to play for the Colts, although early in the season he secured a permit to play for University instead as he played football for the University side. Despite his poor beginning in First-Class cricket he was still in contention for selection for South Australia and played in some intra-state practice matches in October 1924. He had a solid early season for University, averaging 120 after the first two games, and his selection in a fourteen man squad from which South Australia's side for the first Sheffield Shield game of the season against Victoria was picked was uncontroversial.

Walsh played against Victoria in the 1924-25 Sheffield Shield opening game at the Adelaide Oval and batted aggressively, but was only able to score 27 of South Australia's 518 runs in the first innings and a 33 in the second. In November he was selected to represent Australia in a tour game against the M.C.C. Ashes side, and scored 34 not out in the first innings, accompanying Arthur Richardson to his double-century, but only scored 2 opening in the second innings. He played his first First-Class game not at the Adelaide Oval against Victoria on the M.C.G. in late November, but was unable to score, making just 2 and 14. In late December/early January he played against New South Wales at the S.C.G. and made a duck and 11, and bowled for the first time in First-Class cricket taking 1 for 25. He was dropped to twelfth man for South Australia's final game of the season against NSW at home, but after Arthur Richardson was injured he withdrew at the last minute as he was unable to secure leave from work and was replaced by another twelfth man. Walsh had a strong return to district cricket after another disappointing First-Class season scoring 110 for University against East Torrens in February 1925. He played in the district final which University won, but they lost the challenge match against his old club Sturt for the 1924-25 Premiership although Walsh did top score for University with 57.

The South Australian Cricket Association persisted with Walsh into the 1925-26 season, selecting him in a trial intra-state match in October 1925, and he scored 23. A report of his early performance in the district season noted that he was reportedly batting well in practice, but struggling to convert that form into runs in matches. It was also reported that he had largely stopped bowling. He was not first choice for the state team for the season opener against Victoria, but was selected after two players withdrew from the XI, and made a duck in the first innings, but moved up to open in the second and scored 24, in what was observed to be an uncharacteristically reserved fashion. He was retained in the side for a non-Sheffield Shield game against Western Australia a few days later opening the batting and scored 21 in the first innings and 15 chasing a total of 32 in the second innings in what was his last First-Class game. As of March 1926 Walsh had scored 417 runs at an average of 41.70 in the district cricket season, and his season was described as consistent but not outstanding. He represented South Australia in cricket again in April 1926 in a Y.M.C.A. cricket tournament scoring 109 in 50 minutes. In late April he played in the game in which University won the 1925-26 Premiership against his old club Sturt.

=== Later career ===
Walsh returned to Sturt Cricket Club for the 1926-27 season. In October 1926 he was once again selected in an intra-state trial match ahead of the district and Sheffield Shield seasons, but was mediocre, and pulled out of a second trial match later the same month. In November he was reportedly in contention to be selected for a South Australian tour of New Zealand. In December he was selected in a team of Prince Alfred College alumni which played a game against the current College cricket team, and in January 1927 he played in a Prince Alfred College alumni vs St. Peter's College alumni match in which he scored a century which was hailed as a return to form, as he had been poor in the district season. In March he scored 70 in 107 minutes for Sturt in a district semi-final which was described as consisting of pretty batting and featured a large six, but scored a duck in the final against Port Adelaide which Sturt lost.

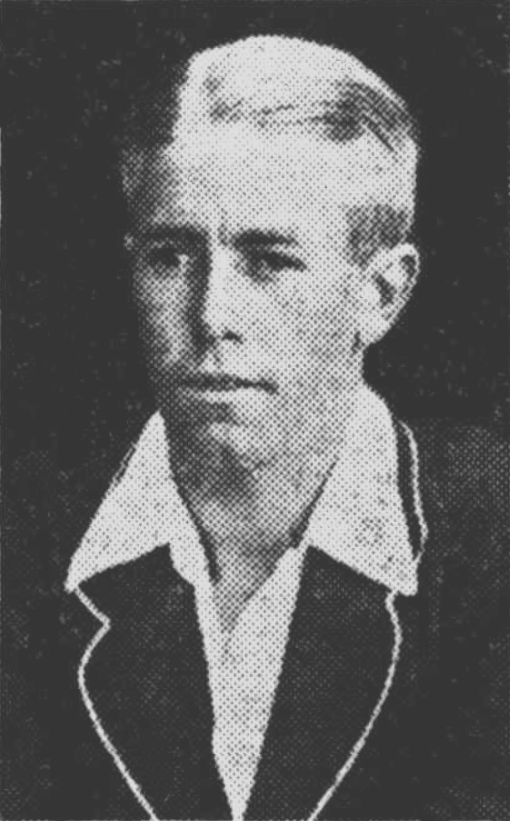
Norman Walsh, 1927.

In the off-season Walsh injured himself playing football for a Prince Alfred College alumni side which he was captaining and missed the first game of the 1927-28 district season. The injury persisted until late October, and after recovering he played for Sturt in the B Grade side, scoring 39 and 71, to prepare for A Grade cricket again. He scored just 9 in his first innings in A Grade cricket for the season. He scored 116 against Adelaide in the fourth round, and 125 against Glenelg in the fifth round. In January 1928 he participated in a net session for promising South Australian juniors coached by Patsy Hendren at the Adelaide Oval. At the end of the 1927-28 rounds in March he had scored 377 runs at an average of 62.83 in the season. He scored 16 and 63 in a semi-final against East Torrens which Sturt lost, and after the finals he had reached 502 runs for the season, the most of any batsman for Sturt. He played football again in the off-season and vice-captained South Australia in an amateur game against a Victorian side in May 1928. In August he was awarded a Trophy for best A Grade batting in the previous season at a Sturt Cricket Club event.

In October 1928, during the 1928-29 district season, Walsh was invited to a net session for players with potential to be selected in a tour game against the M.C.C. Ashes side, however by the end of the rounds he had scored just 153 runs for Sturt at an average of 19.12 in the season, and he was playing for the Sturt B Grade team in March. In the offseason he took up baseball for a Sturt baseball team, and achieved the best season batting average. He improved in the 1929-30 district season, and was once again mentioned as a potential selection for the state side in December 1929, and overall he scored 351 runs at 31.90 in the season with a top score of 95 and took 8 wickets at 43.62. In his first three matches of the 1930-31 season he scored 100 runs at an average of 33.33. He scored well consistently in the 1931-32 season, and was in contention for highest aggregate of the season with 573 runs shortly before the end of the season, and finished third with 582 runs at 52.90. Sturt also won the Premiership, and Walsh had scored the most runs for the club in the season.

In September 1933 Walsh was appointed assistant secretary for the Sturt Cricket Club and also to a temporary selection committee, having previously judged an open trial for bowlers under 25 to join Sturt in January 1930. He scored 320 runs at 32.00 without a century in the 1933-34 district season. He had a poor season in 1934-35 scoring just 152 runs at 16.80 and failing to reach fifty, but improved in the 1935-36 season and was able to score 359 runs in the season and 106 in a semi-final. He played in the 1936-37 season but was not among the leading run scorers.

Walsh retired from district cricket before the 1937-38 season and began playing for the Prince Alfred Old Collegians side in Adelaide Turf cricket, scoring 102 in November 1938. As of 1941 Walsh was still associated with the Sturt Cricket Club but had enlisted in the Australian Imperial Force. In 1944 he played in an Australian services cricket match in Queensland taking 7 for 27 with the ball. In 1946 he served on a committee which organized a Sturt Cricket Club reunion which also welcomed returned servicemen who had played for the club, representing the period 1920 to 1930.

== First-class statistics ==
Walsh played three seasons for South Australia in the Sheffield Shield but failed to score well. He was primarily a batsman but did bowl sparingly in his second season taking one wicket.

Norman Walsh
Season	Team	Mat	Batting		Bowling		Fielding		Ref
Season	Team	Mat	Runs	Avg	Wkt	Ave	C	St	Ref
1923/24	South Australia	3	59	11.80	–	–	1	0	
1924/25	South Australia	4	123	17.57	1	39.00	2	0	
1925/26	South Australia	2	60	15.00	–	–	2	0	
