= Harvey Jolly =

Australian cricketer (born 1960)

Personal information
- Full name: Harvey Bruce Jolly
- Born: 1 August 1960 (age 66); Naracoorte, South Australia, Australia
- Batting: Right-handed
- Bowling: Leg-break and googly
- Role: Batsman

Domestic team information
- Years: Team
- 1987/88: South Australia

Career statistics
Competition	First-class
Matches	8
Runs scored	280
Batting average	28.00
100s/50s	0/2
Top score	65
Balls bowled	36
Wickets	0
Bowling average	-
5 wickets in innings	0
10 wickets in match	0
Best bowling	0/6
Catches/stumpings	6/0
- Source: Cricinfo, 30 July 2026

Harvey Bruce Jolly (born 1 August 1960) is an Australian former cricketer, cricket administrator, lawn bowls administrator and community-sport official. A right-handed batsman who bowled leg-breaks and googlies, he played eight first-class matches for South Australia during the 1987–88 season.

== Playing career ==
Jolly played district cricket for Salisbury District Cricket Club, now merged into the Northern Districts Cricket Club. He was a member of Salisbury A-grade premiership teams in 1981–82, 1983–84, 1986–87, 1987–88 and 1988–89. Northern Districts lists him among the club's players who represented South Australia.

Jolly made his first-class debut for South Australia during the 1987–88 Sheffield Shield season. He played eight matches during the season. He was a member of the South Australian team in which Darren Lehmann made his Sheffield Shield debut in 1987.

He later joined Southern District Cricket Club. Jolly served as Southern District's captain-coach for three seasons from 1993–94 to 1995–96. His first season in the role coincided with the club's entry into SACA A-grade cricket. During the 1993–94 season he scored 161 in A Grade, one of the highest individual scores recorded by the club. He also took five five-wicket innings hauls during his Southern District career.

After his playing career, Jolly also served as a first-class match referee. He was the referee for the Sheffield Shield match between South Australia and Tasmania at Adelaide Oval from 15 to 18 October 1997.

== Cricket administration ==
Jolly subsequently held senior cricket administration roles with the South Australian Cricket Association (SACA). By January 2003 he was SACA's cricket operations manager and was involved in the process of appointing a successor to South Australian coach Greg Chappell.

By 2004 Jolly was serving as SACA's general manager of cricket. In that position he was involved in the contracting and development of South Australian players.

Jolly later served Southern District Cricket Club as president and secretary. He was president when the club won its first SACA first-grade premiership in 2015–16, 22 years after he had led its inaugural A-grade team as captain-coach.

== Lawn Bowls ==
Jolly later became involved in lawn bowls as a player and administrator. He served as secretary of Christies Beach Bowling Club during the 2018–19 season.

In 2021, Jolly was part of a team with Grant Fisher, Alister Behenna and Rick Hilder that placed third in the Alexandrina Council Senior Supa Series.

He later served on the board of Port Noarlunga Bowling Club, including as bowls director during the 2024–25 and 2025–26 seasons.

== Community-Sport Service ==
In 2019, Jolly was elected chair of the newly established Southern Sport, Recreation and Surf Life Saving Clubs Forum in the City of Onkaparinga. The forum brought together representatives of local clubs, elected council members and council staff to identify common challenges and opportunities and to develop a shared approach to the long-term sustainability and growth of sport, recreation and surf lifesaving organisations across the municipality. Under Jolly’s chairmanship, the forum made a deputation to council, secured council representation, developed a memorandum of understanding and convened meetings involving clubs from throughout the council area.

== Recognition ==
Jolly received SACA service-to-cricket recognition for 25 years of service in 2010–11 and for 50 years in 2017–18. The awards recognised his service to SACA, Southern District Cricket Club, Salisbury District Cricket Club and the South Australian state team.

In 2016–17, Jolly received the Statewide Super Premier Cricket Volunteer of the Year award.

In 2018, Jolly was selected as a baton bearer for the 2018 Commonwealth Games Queen's Baton Relay.

In 2024 he was appointed patron of the South Australian Cricket Umpires and Scorers Association. He became the association's fourth patron, following Donald Bradman, former Test umpire Colin Egar and former South Australian cricketer Neil Dansie.

== See also ==
- List of South Australian representative cricketers
