= Cullen Bailey =

Australian cricketer

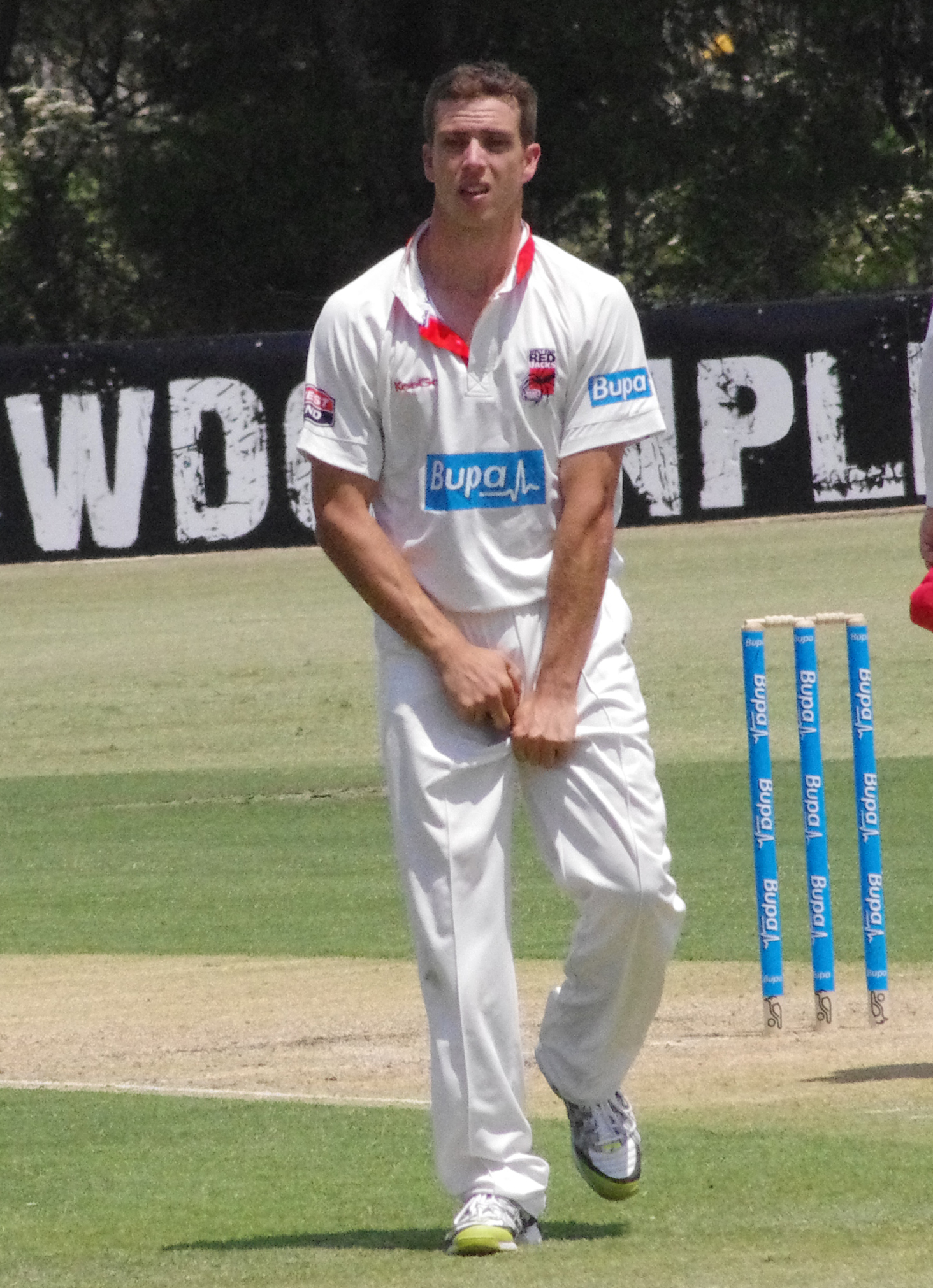

Personal information
- Full name: Cullen Benjamin Bailey
- Born: 26 February 1985 (age 41); Bedford Park, South Australia, Australia
- Nickname: Rev
- Height: 1.85 m (6 ft 1 in)
- Batting: Right-handed
- Bowling: Legbreak googly
- Role: Bowler

Domestic team information
- Years: Team
- 2004/05–2012/13: South Australia
- First-class debut: 10 March 2005 South Australia v Tasmania
- Last First-class: 25 November 2011 South Australia v Queensland
- List A debut: 25 January 2006 South Australia v Western Australia
- Last List A: 14 February 2013 South Australia v New South Wales

Career statistics
Competition	FC	LA	T20
Matches	31	11	6
Runs scored	812	55	1
Batting average	21.36	27.50	1.00
100s/50s	0/3	0/0	0/0
Top score	91	19*	1
Balls bowled	6241	426	90
Wickets	79	12	3
Bowling average	49.46	35.50	47.33
5 wickets in innings	2	0	0
10 wickets in match	0	–	–
Best bowling	5/90	3/33	1/28
Catches/stumpings	16/0	2/0	0/0
- Source: CricketArchive, 5 November 2011

Cullen Benjamin Bailey (born 26 February 1985) is a former Australian first-class cricketer. A leg-spin bowler, he represented South Australia in the Ryobi Cup and Sheffield Shield, the Australian domestic cricket competitions.

== Cricket career ==
Along with former South Australian spinner Dan Cullen, Bailey attended Westminster School in Adelaide where he was coached by Kim Harris, former assistant coach of South Australia. Bailey had been coached by Terry Jenner, the man who advised Shane Warne, and was thought to be a prospect to be the leg-spinner to follow Warne and Stuart MacGill into the Australian cricket team. He was given a national contract but did not represent Australia. He took 5 for 90 and 3 for 89 when South Australia defeated Queensland by 19 runs at the Adelaide Oval in the Sheffield Shield in February 2009.

Bailey captained Sturt to the premiership in the Adelaide Grade Cricket competition in his last year at the club in 2009/10. He then played for Glenelg, captaining them in 2012/13 to their first premiership in 39 years.

== Post-retirement life ==
After retiring from cricket, Bailey now works in media management, and was chief of staff for Environment and Water Minister David Speirs.
