= Bob O'Shannassy =

Australian cricketer and Australian rules footballer

Personal information
- Full name: Robert Martin O'Shannassy
- Born: 7 March 1949 (age 77); Hindmarsh, South Australia
- Batting: Right handed
- Bowling: Right arm medium
- Role: All-rounder

Domestic team information
- Years: Team
- 1976/77 - 1981/82: South Australia

Career statistics
Competition	First-class	List A
Matches	4	1
Runs scored	125	4
Batting average	20.83	–
100s/50s	–/–	–/–
Top score	48	4*
Balls bowled	528	60
Wickets	5	2
Bowling average	56.80	31.00
5 wickets in innings	–	–
10 wickets in match	–	–
Best bowling	2/54	2/62
Catches/stumpings	3/–	–/–
- Source: Cricinfo, 18 January 2023

Robert Martin O'Shannassy (born 7 March 1949) is a former Australian cricketer and Australian rules footballer.

O'Shannassy played in four first-class matches for South Australia in 1976/77 and one List A match in 1981/82, and played 16 matches for North Adelaide Football Club in the South Australian National Football League (SANFL).

Born in Hindmarsh, an inner suburb of Adelaide, O'Shannassy attended Prospect Primary School and Adelaide High School before studying Pharmacy at the University of Adelaide.

== Cricket ==
Originally a wicket-keeper, O'Shannassy made his Adelaide Grade cricket debut for Prospect Cricket Club in the 1966/67 season, aged 17 as an all-rounder. He switched to Adelaide University Cricket Club, winning the Bradman Medal for the best player in Adelaide Grade cricket in 1968/69, 1979/80 and 1980/81 before his appointment as captain of Tea Tree Gully Cricket Club in 1983/84. On his retirement from Grade cricket in 1986, O'Shannassy had scored 4278 runs at 18.43 and took 521 wickets at 18.34, with a highest score of 71 and best bowling performance of 8/26.

O'Shannassy made his first-class debut for South Australia on 8 January 1977 against Western Australia at the WACA, scoring 10 and one not out and taking 2/75.

O'Shannassy made his highest first-class score of 48 and best bowling analysis of 2/54 in the same match, against Queensland at the Adelaide Oval but only played one more first-class match for South Australia.

O'Shannassy remained out of the South Australian side until the 1981/82 season when he was chosen to make his List A debut, against New South Wales at the Sydney Cricket Ground on 3 December 1981. He made 4* and took 2/62 from 10 overs as South Australia lost by 111 runs.

== See also ==
- List of South Australian representative cricketers

== Sources ==
- Coward, M. "Begorrah - It's Bob!", Australian Cricket, February 1977, Modern Magazines: Sydney.
- Page, R. (1984) South Australian Cricketers 1877-1984, Association of Cricket Statisticians: Retford, Nottinghamshire.
- Sando, G. (1997) Grass Roots, South Australian Cricket Association: Adelaide. ISBN 9781862544352
