= Norman Oswald =

Australian cricketer (1916–1970)

Personal information
- Born: 31 October 1916; Adelaide, Australia
- Died: 22 June 1970 (aged 53)
- Source: Cricinfo, 18 September 2020

Norman Oswald (31 October 1916 – 22 June 1970) was an Australian cricketer. A leg-spinner, Oswald played in twelve first-class matches for South Australia between 1936 and 1950.

Playing for Adelaide Cricket Club in the 1936/37 South Australian district cricket competition, Oswald took the most wickets, with 51 at an average of 15.6.

== See also ==
- List of South Australian representative cricketers
