= David Pritchard (cricketer) =

Australian cricketer

Dave Pritchard
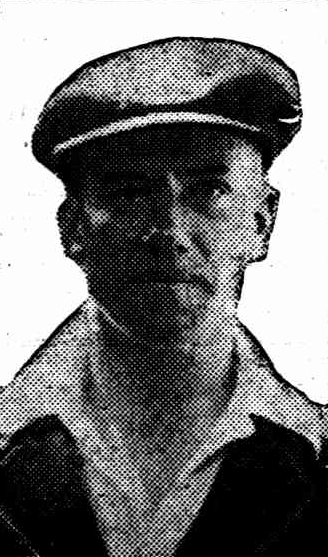

Personal information
- Born: 5 January 1893; Queenstown, South Australia
- Died: 5 January 1983 (aged 90); Myrtle Bank, South Australia
- Batting: Left-handed

Domestic team information
- Years: Team
- 1918/19–1931/32: South Australia

Career statistics
| Competition | First-class |
|---|---|
| Matches | 49 |
| Runs scored | 2,963 |
| Batting average | 34.05 |
| 100s/50s | 6/16 |
| Top score | 167 |
| Balls bowled | 185 |
| Wickets | 3 |
| Bowling average | 34.66 |
| 5 wickets in innings | 0 |
| 10 wickets in match | 0 |
| Best bowling | 1/4 |
| Catches/stumpings | 51/– |
- Source: Cricinfo, 27 May 2020

David Edward Pritchard (5 January 1893 – 4 July 1983) was an Australian cricketer. He played forty-nine first-class matches for South Australia between 1918/19 and 1931/32, captaining the state in two of them. He played for Port Adelaide Cricket Club in district cricket from 1910 to 1935/36 and captained them from 1922 to 1927.

His batting was noted for being unorthodox, as it was cross-bat, and aggressive. He was also notable for his quality as a slips fielder, only fielding in that position.

== Cricket career ==
Pritchard began playing cricket while attending Largs Bay College and scored the first century made by a member of his College team. When he was seventeen he joined the Port Adelaide B team and in 1911 he debuted for the senior side in district cricket. A 1912 match report noted that Pritchard showed potential. When the district competition was suspended during WWI he played for the Foresters in the Adelaide and Suburban Cricket Association competition. When district cricket resumed Pritchard topped the batting averages for Port Adelaide for the 1918–19 season scoring 548 runs at an average of 68.5.

On 1 January 1919, Pritchard made his First-Class debut for South Australia in a match against Victoria at the Melbourne Cricket Ground, having been named twelfth man but substituted in for Hurtle Willsmore for the game and he scored a 3 in both of South Australia's innings. In the 1919-20 district season he scored 846 runs at an average of 94 which was the record season aggregate for South Australian cricket at the time, however in the 1919-20 Sheffield Shield season he averaged just 20.83 in his three matches, with the only highlight of his season being a partnership with Vic Richardson against Victoria in which he scored 91. In the 1920-21 Sheffield Shield season he played in just two of South Australia's four games and scored 44 runs at an average of 11. A later report attributed his struggles early in his First-Class career to nerves causing him to lose his wicket early in his innings.

In December 1921, Pritchard scored his first century in First-Class cricket in the first Sheffield Shield game of the season against New South Wales, but despite a good start in South Australia's second innings he was stumped for 22 during a batting collapse and South Australia lost the game. He did not pass fifty again in the 1921–22 season and averaged 35 overall. In 1922 he became captain of Port Adelaide when captain J. R. Moroney briefly left the country, and in 1923 when Moroney returned Pritchard was elected captain in his stead with Moroney consenting to serve as vice-captain. He reportedly lost the toss a remarkable number of times in his early years of captaincy. He only represented South Australia once in the 1922-23 Sheffield Shield season, scoring just 16 runs in his only match. The following season was his best yet for South Australia in which he played three matches and scored 249 runs at an average of 49.80, although he struggled in district cricket after the interstate games with his club season being described as a rank failure.

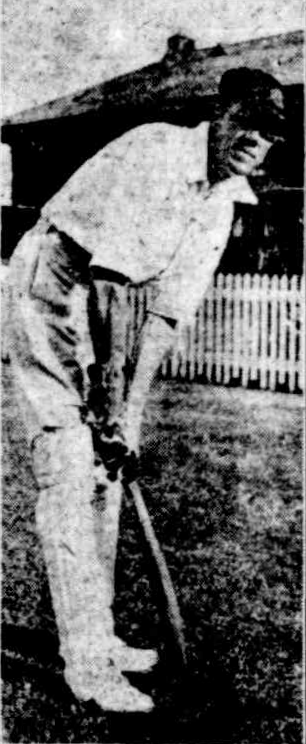
Dave Pritchard, 1924.

In October 1924, a report named him the best left-handed batsman in South Australia, and noted that while he had previously been limited to leg-side scoring he had improved his off-side play considerably. He was prevented from showcasing his improvement in South Australia's first game of the Shield season as he was confined to bed due to influenza, however in the remaining three games he was able to score 488 runs, the second highest for the season, at an average of 81.33 with two centuries and four fifties. He also represented South Australia in both of their tour games against the M.C.C. as part of the 1924-25 Ashes scoring 87 in the second match and hitting Maurice Tate for fifteen off one over. As of late 1924 he was being described as the best club batsman in South Australia, and among the best left-handed batsmen in the country second only to Warren Bardsley. In January 1925 a writer suggested that Pritchard would have been selected for Australia had he played for New South Wales or Victoria, praising him for his more aggressive approach to batting, and he was reportedly in consideration for selection for the Test team that month, but had a poor start to the district cricket season with a series of small scores.

In February 1925, some Adelaide newspapers called for Pritchard to begin opening the batting for Port Adelaide and South Australia so that he could be selected as opener for Australia when Warren Bardsley retired. A report on his performance in a club game described him as too nervous to effectively open the batting. In March an Adelaide paper called for him to be selected for the Australian Test tour to England, suggesting that if he emulated his success of the 1924–25 season he would have to be selected.

In November 1925, a trial match between two Australian teams was held and Pritchard's omission from either side was noted. He performed well in a non-Sheffield Shield interstate game against Western Australia in November 1925 scoring 167, of which the first 111 were scored in just 125 minutes with 13 fours and a six, which intensified criticism of his omission from the intra-Australia match, particularly towards selector Clem Hill. The criticism abated when Johnny Taylor withdrew from the trial match to undertake university examinations and Pritchard was selected in his place, although it was suggested that he would be an emergency substitute not in either playing XI. He did not play in the match, which drew further criticism from South Australia, where it had been hoped that he would have been able to secure selection in the Test team for the Ashes Tour. The decision was also criticized as while it was intended as a compliment it meant Pritchard had traveled from South Australia to Sydney only to carry drinks.

Overall in the 1925-26 Sheffield Shield season itself, Pritchard failed to emulate his success the previous season, scoring just 151 runs at an average of 18.87 batting at three for the first three matches and dropping down the order to six for the last game. He was able to improve on his performance in district cricket after the end of the Shield season, with it being reported he had gotten his "punch back" after his disappointing First-Class season, and by April he was averaging 59.37 for Port Adelaide. He also bowled in a game against East Torrens taking 2 for 65 on a bat-friendly pitch in February 1926.

Pritchard missed three weeks of the district cricket season due to influenza in October 1926, losing weight due to his illness. He struggled again in the 1926-27 Sheffield Shield season passing 50 only once and scoring 243 runs at 27.00 in five games. His poor form continued in district cricket until he scored 130 for Port Adelaide in February 1927. In October 1927 he lost the captaincy of Port Adelaide, with Norman Williams succeeding him. He was unable to play Sheffield Shield cricket in the 1927–28 season, despite being selected in the first game of the season, and his absence was noted, with a writer expressing that they hoped it was only due to business commitments and he would be able to return to interstate cricket soon. He scored 537 runs at 69 for Port Adelaide in the 1927-28 district cricket season.

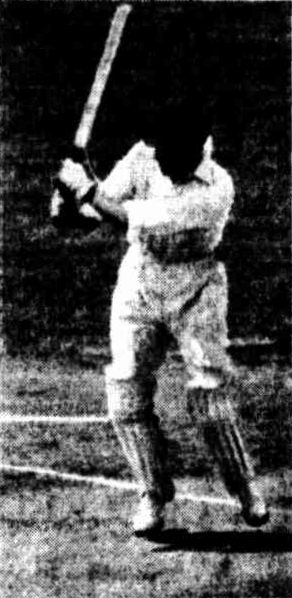
David Pritchard batting for Port Adelaide, 1932.

In October 1928 he was selected to represent South Australia in a match against the touring English Ashes side, and he was noted for his good fielding in the slips, and scored 119 in a hard-hitting innings in which his pull-shot was prominent. His partnership of 255 with Vic Richardson against the M.C.C. was the record for South Australia against England, and South Australian media began to suggest his name for the Australian side again. However he only played in one game in the Sheffield Shield season, scoring 12 and 15 against Victoria in Melbourne in what was described as a disastrous trip for South Australia. His absence from the state side was lamented, suggesting that it was due to personal circumstances and not lack of ability to be selected, and he scored 327 not out in a district semi-final for Port Adelaide, which was the first 300 and record for the highest score in South Australian grade cricket which remained unbroken until 1936. This innings resulted in it being suggested that he may have been selected for Australia had he played interstate cricket in the season. He passed 1000 runs for the 1928-29 district cricket season in the grand final, and reached an aggregate of 1023 runs at an average of 102.30 for the district season breaking the South Australia season aggregate record for the second time in his career. It was suggested South Australia may have won the Sheffield Shield had Pritchard been able to play for them. In November 1929 Pritchard represented South Australia against the M.C.C. in a tour game again scoring 27 and a duck. He was also able to play in all of South Australia's games in the 1929-30 Sheffield Shield season and scored 530 runs at an average of 44.16 with a century and two fifties. He was described as the best slips fielder in Australia in February 1930.

In October 1930, Pritchard was selected as Captain of South Australia for a game against Queensland in Brisbane in the absence of Vic Richardson who was still returning from England after the Ashes. Ahead of the game he said "Although a number of our best players are absent, we expect to give Queensland a good fight.", however Queensland won by seven wickets. He captained South Australia a second time in November against New South Wales in Sydney, in a game which New South Wales won by 213 runs. Pritchard dropped Don Bradman at first slip when he was on 40 in the game, and Bradman went on to score a century. Pritchard played just one other Shield game in the 1930–31 season scoring 120 runs at 20.00 with one fifty overall in the 1930–31 season. In the 1931-32 Sheffield Shield season, his last for South Australia, he played just one game in November 1931 against Victoria in Adelaide scoring 6 and a duck. He had a run of poor scores in district cricket after his last First-Class game, but had a return to form in February, 1932, scoring his first fifty of the season in forty-nine minutes, in an innings of ninety-nine for Port Adelaide against Colts.

A match report from the 1932-33 district season notes that he had given fine service to South Australia, suggesting he had formally retired from First-Class cricket. He continued to play district cricket and in January 1933 he scored 110 with eleven fours against West Torrens. In February 1934 he had a good run of scores for Port Adelaide with straight drives and strong pulls to leg being noted as his best shots. He scored 189 runs at an average of 27.00 without passing fifty in the 1934-35 district season, and retired after the 1935–36 season. In his district career he had scored an estimated 7108 runs and taken 46 wickets at an average of 28.30 for Port Adelaide.

In 1942, Pritchard came out of retirement to play for a Port Adelaide Veterans side in a single innings charity match for the Fighting Forces Comfort Fund, but made a duck.

== Post-retirement ==
After cricket Pritchard played tennis at a high level into his fifties, and he was playing lawn bowls as of 1953.

In his career Pritchard was a stock-broker. In 1944 he was almost killed when he was electrocuted while inspecting the premises of R. J. Finlayson & Co. Ltd. In 1953 he was a member of a mine inspecting party to Tennant Creek.
