= Charlie Walker (Australian cricketer) =

Australian cricketer

Personal information
- Full name: Charles William Walker
- Born: 19 February 1909; Brompton Park, South Australia
- Died: 18 December 1942 (aged 33); Soltau, Free State of Prussia, Nazi Germany
- Batting: Right-handed
- Role: Wicket-keeper

Domestic team information
- Years: Team
- 1928/29–1941/42: South Australia

Career statistics
Competition	First-class
Matches	109
Runs scored	1,754
Batting average	14.99
100s/50s	0/2
Top score	71
Catches/stumpings	171/149
- Source: Cricinfo, 15 January 2007

Charles William Walker (19 February 1909 – 18 December 1942) was a cricketer who played for South Australia. A specialist wicket-keeper and right-handed batsman, Walker was born in Brompton, an inner-suburb of Adelaide.

Nicknamed "Chilla", Walker started his cricket career for the local Coglin Street Mission Cricket Club before making his Adelaide Grade cricket debut for West Torrens Cricket Club and later transferring to Prospect Cricket Club.

Walker made his first-class debut for South Australia at the end of the 1928/29 season, making eights dismissals (three caught and five stumped), and his form in the 1929/30 season, including four stumpings and three catches in a match against the touring English side, led to his inclusion in the 1930 Australian tour of England.

Unfortunately for Walker, a succession of finger injuries hampered his chances during the tour and he missed the 1934 England tour. Chosen for the 1938 Ashes tour of England, Walker again suffered a succession of injuries and did not play in a Test.

== Military service and death ==
Walker enlisted in the Royal Australian Air Force on 3 February 1941 and gained the rank of Flying Officer. Assigned to the 14 Operational Training Unit, Walker served as an air gunner. On 17 December 1942, the Avro Lancaster that Walker was serving on was shot down in the area of Soltau, killing Walker and everybody else aboard.

== Personal life ==
Walker's sister May represented South Australia in netball while May's husband Bob Quinn was a leading Australian rules footballer with Port Adelaide Football Club. Walker's cousin Ron Hamence was a member of Don Bradman's Invincibles.

The South Australian Cricket Association now presents the Charlie Walker Trophy to the best wicket-keeper in Adelaide Grade Cricket. Walker's nephew Greg Quinn won the award seven times.
