= Andrew Staunton =

Australian cricketer

Personal information
- Full name: Andrew Michael Staunton
- Born: May 18, 1979 (age 47); Campsie, Sydney, New South Wales
- Batting: Right-handed
- Bowling: Right-arm fast-medium

Domestic team information
- Years: Team
- South Australia

Career statistics
Competition	FC
Matches	1
Runs scored	4
Batting average	–
100s/50s	0/0
Top score	3*
Balls bowled	144
Wickets	1
Bowling average	92.00
5 wickets in innings	0
10 wickets in match	0
Best bowling	1/92
Catches/stumpings	0/0
- Source: Cricinfo, 3 December 2025

Andrew Staunton (born 18 May 1979) is an Australian cricketer. He played in one first-class match for South Australia in 2003. He took one wicket, that of Andrew Symonds.

Staunton grew up in Sydney, and played for the New South Wales second XI. He moved from Sydney to Adelaide in 2003 to further his career, and made his debut for South Australia that year.

Staunton played for Southern Districts Cricket Club and later coached them for several years, winning a premiership in 2016. Club president Harvey Jolly noted at the time of the premiership that Staunton's "passion, enthusiasm and never-say-die attitude" were infectious.

== See also ==
- List of South Australian representative cricketers
