= Bice Oval =

Public park in South Australia

Coordinates: 35°08′28″S 138°28′55″E

- Christies Beach
- Interactive map of Bice Oval
- Full name: John Bice Memorial Oval
- Location: Christie Avenue, Christies Beach, South Australia
- Owner: City of Onkaparinga
- Operator: Christies Beach Sports and Social Club
- Surface: Grass
- Record attendance: 9,724 (South Adelaide v Norwood, 3 August 1991)
- Field size: Football: 166m x 132m Cricket: 135m x 129m

Construction
- Groundbreaking: 1965
- Opened: 27 March 1966
- Cost: $2,000

Tenants
- Christies Beach Football Club (SFL) (1966–present) Southern District Cricket Club (SACA) (1982–present)

The John Bice Memorial Oval is a public park in the Australian state of South Australia located within the suburb of Christies Beach and which is used by the Christies Beach Football Club and Southern District Cricket Club as their home ground.

== History ==
In 1956 the District Council of Noarlunga and, through successful lobbying by the Hon. John Bice, the South Australian Government purchased some land to be set aside as a playing area for the residents of Christies Beach.

In 1963 the Christies Beach Football Club took lease of the area and using volunteer labour and community funds, converted the area from a limestone paddock into a turfed oval with mounds and clubrooms.

== Major events ==
The South Adelaide Football Club played two SANFL league games at the venue in 1992 and 1993, with the first game, against the Glenelg Football Club attracting crowd of over 8,000. The success of these games convinced South Adelaide to relocate to the new Noarlunga Oval in 1995 after playing their home games at the Adelaide Oval (ironically located north of the Adelaide City Centre and the River Torrens) since 1904, as well as relocating their administration offices and clubrooms from St Marys to the oval.

Bice Oval has hosted three Southern Football League Division 1 Grand Finals (1975, 1985 & 2000), 20 Division 2 Grand Finals (1979, 1981–84, 1987–2001) and numerous finals.
