= Willsmore =

Willsmore is a surname. Notable people with the surname include:

- Dallas Willsmore (born 1995), Australian rules footballer
- Hurtle Willsmore (1889–1985), Australian rules footballer and cricketer
