= Peter Gladigau =

Australian cricketer (born 1965)

Personal information
- Full name: Peter Wayne Gladigau
- Born: 23 May 1965 (age 61); Whyalla, South Australia
- Batting: Right-handed
- Bowling: Right-arm fast-medium

Domestic team information
- Years: Team
- 1985-86 to 1992-93: South Australia

Career statistics
| Competition | FC | List A |
|---|---|---|
| Matches | 39 | 22 |
| Runs scored | 510 | 42 |
| Batting average | 14.57 | 5.25 |
| 100s/50s | 0/1 | 0/0 |
| Top score | 54* | 17 |
| Balls bowled | 7674 | 1178 |
| Wickets | 90 | 24 |
| Bowling average | 41.61 | 33.62 |
| 5 wickets in innings | 2 | 0 |
| 10 wickets in match | 0 | 0 |
| Best bowling | 7/85 | 4/20 |
| Catches/stumpings | 18/– | 6/– |
- Source: Cricinfo, 9 October 2019

Peter Wayne Gladigau (born 23 May 1965) is a former cricketer who played first-class and List A cricket for South Australia from 1985-86 to 1992-93.

Peter Gladigau was an opening bowler. In his best season, 1987–88, he was one of the leading bowlers in the Sheffield Shield, taking 38 wickets at an average of 29.05, including his best career figures of 7 for 85 against Victoria.

He works as a police officer in Adelaide. He represented Glenelg in the Adelaide cricket competition. He was awarded life membership of the club and is now its Cricket Operations Manager.
