= O'Shannassy =

O'Shannassy could refer to:

- O'Shannassy River, a river in Victoria, Australia

- O'Shannassy Reservoir, a reservoir in Victoria, Australia, created by damming the O'Shannassy River

- Bob O'Shannassy (born 1949), Australian cricketer and rules footballer
- Teigan O'Shannassy (born 1999), Australian netball player

== See also ==
- O'Shaughnessy, Irish surname
