= Albert Bartlett =

Albert Bartlett may refer to:

- Albert Bartlett (cricketer) (1900–1968), Australian cricketer
- Albert Allen Bartlett (1923–2013), American physicist
- Albert Charles Bartlett (1892–?), British electrical engineer
- Albert Bartlett (footballer) (1884–1969), English professional footballer
- Albert L. Bartlett (1851–1934), American politician in Massachusetts
