= Alfred Eneberg =

Australian cricketer

Personal information
- Born: 30 November 1928; Birkenhead, South Australia
- Died: 7 November 2016 (aged 87)
- Source: Cricinfo, 27 November 2018

Alfred Eneberg (30 November 1928 – 7 November 2016) was an Australian cricketer. He played one first-class match for South Australia in 1951/52. He also played for Port Adelaide Cricket Club.

== See also ==
- List of South Australian representative cricketers
