= Ron Hamence =

Australian cricketer (1915–2010)

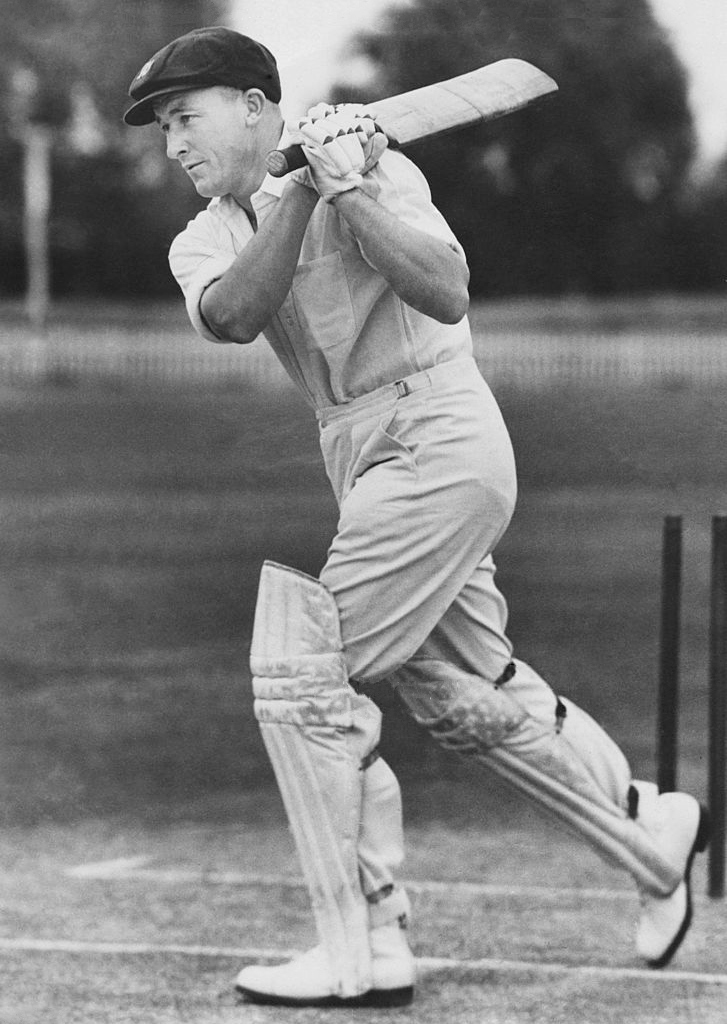
- Hamene batting in about 1946

Personal information
- Full name: Ronald Arthur Hamence
- Born: 25 November 1915; Hindmarsh, South Australia
- Died: 24 March 2010 (aged 94); Adelaide, South Australia
- Batting: Right-handed
- Bowling: Right-arm medium
- Role: Specialist batsman

International information
- National side: Australia
- Test debut (cap 176): 28 February 1947 v England
- Last Test: 1 January 1948 v India

Domestic team information
- Years: Team
- 1935/36–1950/51: South Australia

Career statistics
Competition	Test	First-class
Matches	3	99
Runs scored	81	5,285
Batting average	27.00	37.75
100s/50s	0/0	11/26
Top score	30*	173
Balls bowled	–	517
Wickets	–	8
Bowling average	–	29.87
5 wickets in innings	–	0
10 wickets in match	–	0
Best bowling	–	2/13
Catches/stumpings	1/–	34/–
- Source: CricketArchive, 26 February 2008

Ronald Arthur Hamence (25 November 1915 – 24 March 2010) was a cricketer who played for South Australia and Australia. A short and compact right-handed batsman, Hamence excelled in getting forward to drive and had an array of attractive back foot strokes. Already the youngest Australian to play district cricket, he was also, from the death of Bill Brown in 2008 until his own death in 2010, the oldest surviving Australian Test cricketer.

While Hamence only played three Test matches for his national team, he had a successful domestic career, being called South Australia's most successful batsman in 1950. He played 99 first-class matches from 1935 until 1951, which brought him a career total of 5,285 runs that came at an average of 37.75 runs per innings and included 11 centuries. He scored two of these centuries in his first and last first-class matches.

== Career ==
Born in the Adelaide suburb of Hindmarsh, Hamence was the cousin of Charlie Walker, a fellow Australian cricketer. At 15 years and 25 days, Hamence became the youngest district cricketer in South Australian cricket history when he made his debut for Adelaide club West Torrens in 1930. While playing with the SA team, he worked as a public servant at the Government Printing Office. He was a compact batsman preferring attack over defence, however he suffered a weakness throughout his career against fast bowling.

He joined South Australia part way through the 1935–36 season, and in March 1936, he scored a century (121) on his first-class cricket debut against Tasmania at the Adelaide Oval. This was to be his only match of the season, which left him with a debut season average of 121.00. At the start of his first full season, he followed this up with scores of 16 and four against the touring England team and Victoria and seven and 19 against New South Wales. On Christmas Day, 1936, however, he scored his second first-class century, 104 against Queensland in the first innings. He would go on to score 52 in the second.

Scores of three not out, 28, 27, 35 and four followed before his next significant score, 52, against Queensland on 12 February 1937. He ended the season with 336 runs, one century, and an average of 30.54. He then suffered his worst period of form thus far at the start of the 1937–38 season, failing to reach double figures from 17 December 1937 until early January 1938, when he scored 64 in the second innings, against Victoria. He followed this with 49 against New South Wales, and ended his third season with 283 runs at an average of 21.76. He did not play another cricket match until 16 December 1938 at the start of the next season, however he returned with a score of 90 against New South Wales, and followed that up two matches later with 84 against Victoria. He narrowly missed out on his third century in November 1939 when he was caught by Morris Sievers for 99 against Victoria. He scored 41, 12, 6 and 20 to see out the rest of the year, ending with 239 runs at an average of 47.80, his most successful full season thus far.

In 1940, he began the year with 26 and two against Queensland, and then a 43 against New South Wales. A series of low scores followed until he hit a vein of strong form beginning in February of that year. He scored 63 against Western Australia on 16 February 1940 in his last match of the 1939–40 season. He began the following season with 41 in the following match against New South Wales. Hamence then enjoyed great success against Victoria, where he scored 130 and 103 not out in one inter-state match, and then 85 and 62 in the next. Following this, in a match at the Melbourne Cricket Ground between two representative selections to raise money for the war effort, he played for Don Bradman's XI and scored 73 and 35. He returned to play for South Australia for a match against New South Wales, where he scored 31 and five. He ended the 1940–41 season with the highest average for a single season he would achieve in his career, 569 runs at 63.22, with two hundreds.

=== Second World War and after ===
Hamence was not to play another first-class match until December 1945 after the end of the Second World War. During the war, he served for four years with the Royal Australian Air Force. Upon his return, he immediately hit form for South Australia against New South Wales where he hit 74 not out and 75 in a match starting 14 December 1945. He then scored 56 against Victoria on 18 January, and then after three single figure scores he hit 76 against Queensland. He then experienced a drop in form, with only one significant score, 46 against Wellington, for seven innings. He ended the 1945–46 season with 332 runs at 36.88. At the start of the 1946–47 season, however, he enjoyed his greatest success thus far, scoring consecutive centuries in three innings from 15 November 1946 until 19 December: 116 against Victoria and 132 and 101 not out against New South Wales, the latter followed up by a score of 48 in the second innings. This was followed by a career-best 145 against the touring MCC team on 24 January 1947, and 63 against Queensland on 21 February. He ended the season with 675 runs at 56.25.

=== International debut, England, India and the Invincibles ===
These centuries led to his debut for Australia in the Fifth Test at Sydney on 28 February 1947. Hamence scored 30 not out in the first innings as Australia made 253 in response to England's first innings 280. England managed 186 in response and Australia, set 213 to win, reached it in 52.2 overs. However Hamence made only one in his second innings. He returned to domestic cricket, however over six innings his highest score was 27.

Nevertheless, Hamence was picked to play in the Second and Third Tests against the touring Indian cricket team in Australia in 1947–48. He made 25 in the first innings of both matches, with the first, starting 12 December 1947, ended in a draw before Hamence could bat again. In the Third Test, which started on 1 January 1948, Australia achieved victory with centuries from Don Bradman and Arthur Morris meaning Hamence was again not needed to bat in the second innings. He was then replaced by Neil Harvey for the final two Tests.

Returning once again to domestic cricket, Hamence scored 85 and 66 against Queensland, and this kept him in the running for a place in the national team, as he toured with The Invincibles in England in 1948. He was not selected to play in any of the Tests, however he reiterated when interviewed in 2008 that he felt no resentment over not having played. Hamence was a popular member of the touring squad and his cheerful nature and splendid tenor voice added to the good spirits of the team. His success in the warm up games was mixed, scores of 92, 46 and 49 not out against Cambridge University, Essex and Lancashire mixed with a duck, seven, one, three, two and five against other counties. Against Somerset, approaching his first century of the tour, the Australian players, keen to see Hamence succeed, left their card games to applaud only to see him dismissed for 99, his highest score for the season. He also faced Scotland for two matches in August 1948, scoring six and 15. Overall on the tour he played 19 matches scoring 582 runs at an average of 32.33.

His touring colleague Sid Barnes criticised the omission of Hamence from much meaningful cricket on the tour. He wrote: "For instance, against the Gentlemen at Lord's we were 532 when Hamence came to bat. Brown got 120, Bradman 150, Hassett, not out, 200 and Miller 69. Hamence was left not out with 24. This was an innings in which he could have been sent in first wicket down, where he batted with his interstate team ... Despite this, Hassett still went in before Hamence in the next game, against Somerset ... Hamence batted No. 6... but he should have been sent in No. 3." Bradman, following the Invincibles tour described Hamence as "a fine batsman of the strictly orthodox type. Very sound and reliable with his game based on driving" and a "very safe fieldsman".

Barnes reported that Hamence, along with the other frequent omissions Colin McCool and Doug Ring, termed themselves the "Ground Staff". He added: "In the dressing room during county games they would break out into ironic song about the few chances they got." Bradman did later state that "because of the strong array of batsman ahead of him, [Hamence] seldom had an opportunity to make big scores" but "was an extremely useful reserve who could have been played in the Tests with confidence".

=== Return, retirement and later life ===
Hamence scored 58 and 45 in his first match upon return to Australia, playing for Bradman's XI against a team captained by Lindsay Hassett on 3 December 1948. He then scored a career best 173 against New South Wales, and 55 the following match against Queensland. He then faced Western Australia for his 91st first-class match, scoring another century when he hit 117 against Western Australia. Hamence then suffered a loss of form, not exceeding 31 for 11 innings. He scored a 53 against New South Wales, 64 not out against Queensland and 58 against Victoria, however he then scored nine, one and five in his next three innings. A 48 and 78 against New South Wales and Western Australia followed, however it was becoming clear that his form was waning. Hamence played his final match against Freddie Brown's MCC team on 27 October 1950, scoring 114 in the first innings as South Australia reached 350, and then seven in his final innings before being run out by Bob Berry. His final full season saw him score 418 runs at 32.15.

In total, Hamence played 69 matches for South Australia, scoring 4,244 runs at an average of 38.93, with 11 centuries and 22 fifties. Aside from his 52.75 average for Bradman's XI, South Australia was to be Hamence's most successful team. Of his eleven centuries, three were scored against Victoria, against whom he had an average of 41.75, however he scored the most runs, and his highest score, against New South Wales. In 2001, Hamence was awarded the Centenary Medal for services to Australian society through the sport of cricket.

He died in an Adelaide nursing home, aged 94, in 2010.

== Test match performance ==
		Batting			
Opposition	Matches	Runs	Average	High Score	100 / 50
England	1	31	31.00	30*	0/0
India	2	50	25.00	25	0/0
Overall	3	81	27.00	30	0/0
