= Laurence Walsh (cricketer) =

Australian cricketer

Personal information
- Born: 8 February 1902; Adelaide, Australia
- Died: 12 January 1976 (aged 73)
- Height: 5 ft 10 in (1.78 m)
- Relatives: Norman Walsh (twin brother)
- Source: Cricinfo, 29 September 2020

Laurence Walsh (8 February 1902 – 12 January 1976) was an Australian cricketer. He played in two first-class matches for South Australia in 1930/31.

Walsh had a twin brother, Norman, who also played first-class cricket for South Australia.

== See also ==
- List of South Australian representative cricketers
