= Prospect Cricket Club =

Prospect Pirates
- Full name: Prospect Cricket Club
- Nickname: The Pirates
- Sport: Cricket
- Founded: 1928-29 (SACA)
- First season: 1928-29
- League: South Australian Grade Cricket League
- Home ground: Prospect Oval
- Colours: Maroon and White
- Anthem: The Pirates Song
- President: Tom Hastwell
- Head coach: Christian Hanna
- Captain: Sam Miller
- 2013/2014: 2

Prospect Cricket Club (the "Pirates") are a Grade Cricket team located in Adelaide, South Australia.

Prospect competes in the South Australian Grade Cricket League, administered by the South Australian Cricket Association (SACA). 'A' Grade players in this competition vie for selection in South Australia's State team, which leads to possible selection in the Australian Cricket team.

The club currently fields 4 senior and 6 junior teams and uses Prospect Oval for its A and B grade Home matches.

== History ==
The Prospect District Cricket Club draws on the history of two predecessors, the Prospect Cricket Club and the North Adelaide Cricket Club.

The Prospect Cricket Club was formed during the 1880s and joined the Adelaide and Suburban Cricketing Association as a foundation member at the start of the 1899/1900 cricket season. In 1924 Prospect Cricket Club, based at Prospect Oval, was admitted to the SACA B Grade Competition.

The North Adelaide Cricket Club was originally formed in 1867 as North Adelaide Young Men's Society. It was a foundation member of the SACA competition and won four premierships between 1879 and 1896. It was based at Adelaide Oval.

A decision of the SACA to revise the District boundaries for the 1928–29 season led to discussions between the two clubs, the SACA and the Prospect Council, which eventually resulted in the amalgamation of the two clubs. The new Club would continue in the SACA A Grade competition, with its home base at Prospect Oval. On 1 May 1928, the Prospect District Cricket Club was born.

The club won its first SACA premiership in the 1936–37 season under the captaincy of A. E. Cole.

== Records ==
Prospect has won eight 'A' Grade premierships in the Two-Day version of the game, the first being in 1960/61 and the most recent in 2000/2001.

The club also has won their One-Day Premiership in 1997/98.

== Notable players ==
=== Prospect Cricket Club ===
The club has hosted and nurtured some very notable local, interstate and international players in the past, including Nip Pellew, Charlie Walker, Tim Wall, Gary Sobers, Ashley Mallett, Terry Jenner, Jeff Hammond, Rodney Hogg, Barry Richards, Gary Cosier, Younis Ahmed, Gus Logie, Andrew Zesers, Greg Blewett, Callum Ferguson, Nathan Lyon, and Lou Vincent while over 40 players represented the South Australian State Team.

=== North Adelaide Cricket Club ===
- John Hill
- Ernie Jones
- Karl Quist
- George Searcy
