= Northern Districts Cricket Club =

Northern Districts (Jets)
- Full name: Northern Districts Cricket Club
- Nickname: The Jets
- Sport: Cricket
- Founded: 1997
- First season: 1997/98
- League: South Australian Cricket Association
- Home ground: Salisbury Oval
- Colours: Navy and Orange
- Anthem: "See The Jets Fly Up"
- President: Tom Zorich
- Head coach: Chris Duval
- Captain: Mark Cosgrove
- 2015/16: 6th
- Website: northernjetscricket.com

The Northern Districts Cricket Club ("Jets") is a semi-professional cricket club in Adelaide, South Australia. It competes in the South Australian Grade Cricket Competition, which is administered by the South Australian Cricket Association (SACA).

The club entered the SACA competition in season 1997/98 as the result of the amalgamation of the Elizabeth and Salisbury District Cricket Clubs. In 2004/05 the Jets won the SACA Grade Competition premiership. The club has also won the West End Cup (one-day competition) in 1998/99, the inaugural 20 x 20 SACA competition in 2003/04 and again in 2009/10

The club has produced test players Darren Lehmann, Peter Sleep and recently Graham Manou and Ryan Harris. Whilst Mark Cosgrove has also represented the club at One Day International level. State players include Mark Higgs, Chris Duval and Cameron Williams

The current 'A Grade' captain is Mark Cosgrove

The juniors regularly compete in finals in all grades.

The 'Jets' have also recruited English talent such as Damien Brandy, Stephen Moore, Lee 'the artist' Craig, Mark Pettini, Mervyn Westfield, Ben Wright, Tom Poynton, Matt Pardoe, Joe Gatting, Ben Cox along with Zimbabwean Keeper Craig Dollar

The Jets play their senior home games at Salisbury Oval, Salisbury, South Australia. Other grounds used for home games in the lower grades include the three grounds at the Paddocks Reserve. The club derives its nickname of the Jets from the proximity and prominence of the Edinburgh Air Force Base.
