= Southern Districts Cricket Club =

Southern District
- Southern District Cricket Club
- Nickname: The Stingrays
- League: South Australian Cricket Association

Personnel
- Captain: David Sboro
- Coach: Andrew Zesers
- Chairman: Nigel Smart

Team information
- Colours: Teal, Red & Black
- Founded: 1982/83
- Home ground: Bice Oval

History
- No. of titles: 1
- SACA Premier Cricket 1st Grade wins: 2015-16

The Southern Districts Cricket Club ("Stingrays") is a semi-professional cricket club in Adelaide, South Australia. It competes in the South Australian Grade Cricket League, which is administered by the South Australian Cricket Association (SACA).

The club entered the SACA A grade competition in season 1993/94 after a steady period of development in the lower SACA grades and also with Adelaide and Suburban Turf Association. The zoned area for the club covers from Hallet Cove to Victor Harbor, and the area out to Strathalbyn and Langhorne Creek in the East.

Southern Districts CC has four senior teams plus two under 16 teams, two under 14 teams plus an under 17 team, Ray Sutton team (primary school) and a Scorpions Shield girls team. The Stingrays play their senior home games at Bice Oval, Christies Beach, South Australia.

Former club captain Shane Deitz was the club's first Southern Redbacks (State) team player.

Southern District won their first A-Grade District Cricket premiership in the 2015–16 season.
