= Sturt Cricket Club =

Sturt Blues
- Full name: Sturt Cricket Club
- Nickname: The Blues
- Sport: Cricket
- Founded: 1897
- First season: 1897/98
- League: South Australian Cricket Association
- Home ground: Price Memorial Oval
- Colours: Double Blue
- President: Rob Young
- Head coach: Ben Cameron
- Captain: Mohammed Arhaan Tai
- 2009/10: A Grade Premiers
- Website: sturtdcc.com

The Sturt Cricket Club (formerly the Unley Cricket Club) is a semi-professional cricket club in Adelaide, South Australia. It competes in the South Australian Grade Cricket League, which is administered by the South Australian Cricket Association (SACA).

The club entered the SACA competition in season 1897/98.

The club has produced a number of prominent players including current players Mohammed Arhaan Tai, Cullen Bailey, Jason Borgas, Cameron Borgas, and Tom Moffat.

The Blues play their senior home games at the Price Memorial Oval at Angas Road, Hawthorn, South Australia. C and D grade matches are played at the Unley Oval.
