= Adelaide Cricket Club =

Adelaide Buffalos
- Full name: Adelaide Cricket Club
- Nickname: The Buffalos
- Sport: Cricket
- Founded: 1905
- League: South Australian Grade Cricket League
- Home ground: Glandore Oval
- Colours: Yellow, Blue and Red
- Anthem: "We are the mighty Buffalos"
- President: Mr Neil Ricketts
- Head coach: Damian Kelly
- Captain: Sam Raphael

Adelaide Cricket Club or The Buffalos [sic] is a semi-professional cricket club in Adelaide, South Australia. It competes in the South Australian Grade Cricket League, which is administered by the South Australian Cricket Association (SACA). The Adelaide Cricket Club was formed on 12 September 1905.

Many great names of Australian and South Australian cricket have played for the Adelaide Cricket Club: Badcock, Causby, Cunningham, Gillespie, Grimmett, Giffen, Hogg, Hammond, Nobes, Sincock and Woodcock have played. International Test Cricketers who have played for Adelaide include Chauhan, Greenidge, Mendis and White. All in all the Adelaide Cricket Club has provided the State with 64 representatives, more than any other grade Club.

Record breaking South Australian Jockey John McGowan (see Brooklyn Park) was also a long term player and B Grade Captain of the club.

The club plays its Senior Home Games at Glandore Oval, Glandore, South Australia. Other grounds used by the club include Park 23 and Immanuel College.

Today the club fields four senior men's teams and four junior boy's teams in the South Australian Cricket Association competition.
