= West Torrens Cricket Club =

West Torrens
- Full name: West Torrens District Cricket Club
- Nickname: The Eagles
- Sport: Cricket
- Founded: 1857 (as Hindmarsh CC)
- League: South Australian Cricket Association
- Home ground: Henley Oval
- Colours: (Navy) Blue and Gold
- Anthem: "The Road to Henley Beach"
- President: Kent Sendy
- Captain: Daniel Drew (Men) / Amanda-Jade Wellington & Hannah Knowles (Women)

The West Torrens District Cricket Club ("Eagles") is a Premier Grade Cricket Club in Adelaide, South Australia. It competes in the West End Premier Cricket Competition, which is administered by the South Australian Cricket Association (SACA).

The West Torrens Eagles field four senior men’s, three women’s and seven junior teams and are based at Henley & Grange Memorial Oval. Other grounds used by the club include Henley High School, John Mitchell Reserve and Nazareth College (Flinders Park Campus). Previous home grounds have included Lindsay Circus (1857-1921), Thebarton Oval (1921-1988) and Kings Reserve (1988-1997).

The club has won 16 1st grade men's Two Day premierships with the last 2-Day win being in 2021/22, breaking a 5-year premiership drought, the same season in which they added another 50 over title. More recently the club won a second Men’s T20 title in season 2023/24 (and a 50 over premiership) follow by a further One Day title (50 over) in 2025/26.

In an amazing 2016/17 season, the Eagles fought off a merger ultimatum from the SACA and became the first ever South Australian Premier club to record a clean sweep of the 2-day, one-day and T20 competition titles. The Eagles have now won 8 West End Cup (One Day) Premierships (1971/72, 1972/73, 1993/94, 2003/04, 2016/17, 2021/22, 2023/24 & 2025/26) and two T20 Premierships (2016/17, 2023/24). During the past decade the club has become one of the strongest in South Australian Premier Cricket, producing many players who at the top of SA cricket. WT have won the SACA Club Championship in 2004/05, 2006/07, 2007/08 and 2011/12. In season 2017/18, the West Torrens Women's 1st Grade emulated their male counterparts by also winning every title available, becoming T20 and One-day Premiers. Most recently the “Sheagles” took out the 2019/20 One day premiership.

== History ==
The Club began in 1857 as the Hindmarsh Cricket Club with its headquarters at Lindsay Circus (now Hindmarsh Stadium) and has continued, with only a change of name in 1897, until the present day, making it the oldest continuous and 2nd oldest existing cricket club in South Australia. Morphett Vale Cricket Club (established 1849) is the oldest cricket club in South Australia.

The club moved to Thebarton Oval in 1921 where it remained until 1988 when it transferred to the adjacent King's Reserve. A lack of junior players and inadequate facilities saw a move to the Henley and Grange Memorial Oval for the 1997-98 season where the club had thrived since.

West Torrens started fielding female teams in the 2007/08 season with many players coming from the former Flinders University Women's Cricket Club. The Eagles have won 1st Grade Women's Premierships in 2008/09, 2012/13, 2017/18 and 2019/20 and were T20 Champions in 2013/14 and 2017/18. They have also won the 2nd Grade Premiership in 2013/14 and 2015/16 and doubled up, also winning the T20 Premierships in the same years.

Two books have been published on the history of the club:

- From the Circus to the Pughole (History from 1897/98 - 1996/97) D Brien and R Cassidy (1997)
- All the Kings Men (History of the Hindmarsh Cricket Club, 1857 - 1897) - D Brien (2017)

== Famous players ==
Many famous names have worn the blue and gold cap. Affie Jarvis, Jack O'Connor, Ron Hamence, Bruce Dooland, Graham Hole, David Hookes and Ian Chappell played Test cricket for Australia while West Torrens players. Merv Waite (Australia), Jeff Crowe (New Zealand), Gladstone Small (England), Jason Gallian (England) and more recently Dom Bess (England) played Test cricket soon after playing an Australian summer at West Torrens. Matthew Elliott represented Australia before playing 2 seasons for the Eagles after transferring from the Victorian Bushrangers to the West End Redbacks .

Rick Darling, Rod McCurdy and Bradley Young have been Australian one day international representatives and Charlie Walker, Phil Ridings were members of Australian touring teams.

Former player and club coach Tim Nielsen coached the Australian Cricket Team and worked with the West End Redbacks. Past club captain Callum Ferguson represented Australia, South Australia and the Pune Warriors in the IPL. Peter George represented Australia in a single Test Match in India while Dan Cullen represented Australia in One-Day and Test Match cricket.

AFL Hall of Fame inductee Bob Hank played for WTDCC and in March 1947 Bob Hank (playing for West Torrens) bowled Sir Donald Bradman (playing for Kensington) in a final at Adelaide Oval

MBE recipient, State Cricketer and AFL Hall of Fame inductee Lindsay Head played for WT.

Current first grade star Amanda-Jade Wellington is one of a host of female players who have represented Australia along with Lauren Ebsary, Andrea McCauley and Caroline Ward. Current SA Scorpion (women’s) captain Jemma Barsby joined the “Sheagles” in season 2023/24.

The current men’s squad boasts many BBL & SA Redback players, including Australian T20 & One Day players Spencer Johnson & Jake Fraser-McGurk (who joined the club at the start of the 2024-25 season). Spencer & Jake have recently been signed again by IPL franchises while Spencer won the best player of the match award in the BBL season 13 Grand Final. The club had six male players play in season 14 of the tournament!

== 1st Grade Men's Club Records ==
Batting

Most runs in career: Andrew Haslett, 6781 runs

Most runs in a season: Paul Nobes, 974 runs @ 88.54 in 1987-88

Highest Score: Merv Waite, 339 v P. Adelaide @ Adelaide Oval, March 1936

Highest Team Score: 492 vs P. Adelaide at Adelaide Oval, March 1936

Bowling

Most wickets in career: Percy Combe, 623 wickets

Most wickets in a season: Graham Stanford, 72 wkts @ 10.87 in 1971-72

Best Bowling: Ross McLennan, 10/39 vs University @ Thebarton Voal, Feb 1958

Fielding

Most dismissals in career (wicketkeeper): Rex Blundell, 164 ct, 71 st, 235 dismissals

Most dismissals in a season (wicketkeeper): Jesse Lewis 43 ct, 4 st, 47 dismissals, 2004–05

Most dismissals in an innings(wicketkeeper): Rex Blundell, 0 ct, 7 st, V Woodville @ Thebarton Oval, Oct 1969

General Records

Most Games: Brian Isaac, 211 (1959-60 to 1978-79)

Youngest Player (WT): Ron Hammence, 15y. 25d. v Kensington @ Kensington Oval. 20-12-1930

Youngest Player (Hindmarsh): Affie Jarvis, 14y. 82d. v Kent @ Adelaide Oval 9-1-1875

Oldest Player (WT): Charlies Chittleborough, 56y. 43d. v North Adelaide @ Hindmarsh Oval, 10-2-1912

Oldest Player (Hindmarsh): James Chittleborough, 40y. 330d. v Kent @ Lindsay's Circus, 25-10-1873

== 1st Grade Women's Club Records ==
Batting

Most runs in career: Lauren Ebsary, 3389 runs

Most runs in a season: Kristine Britt, 730 runs @ 66.36 in 2008/09

Highest Individual Score: Lauren Ebsary, 202* (33 x 4, 2 x 6) vs P. Adelaide at Henley Oval, October 2010

Highest Team Score: 4/403 vs P. Adelaide at Henley Oval, October 2010

Bowling

Most wickets in career: Jess Joseph, 108 wkts @ 17.89

Most wickets in a season: Jess Joseph, 26 wkts @ 8.19 in 2017/18

Most wickets in an innings: Kristy Williams, 6/16 vs TTG/ND at Pertaringa Oval, February 2013

General Records

Most Games: Angela Treloar, 116 games (to end of 2024/25).

Youngest Player (WT): Sanvi Shah, 12y. 149d. v Adelaide @ Park 25 #3. October 2023.
