= South Australian Cricket Association =

Peak body for cricket in South Australia

- Sport: Cricket
- Abbreviation: SACA
- Founded: 31 May 1871; 155 years ago
- Affiliation: Cricket Australia
- Headquarters: Adelaide Oval
- President: Will Rayner
- Chairman: Will Rayner

Official website
- www.saca.com.au
- (South Australia)
- (Australia)

The South Australian Cricket Association (SACA) is the peak body for the sport of cricket in South Australia. The association administers the South Australian men's and women's teams based in Adelaide. SACA is the controlling body for the South Australian Grade Cricket League. The chairman is Will Rayner.

== Background ==
The South Australian Cricket Association (SACA) was formed in 1871 as the "South Australian Cricketing Association" and is the state Cricket body in South Australia. It administers the Grade club cricket competition – the South Australian Grade Cricket League – and the state reprenstative men's team, South Australia's first-class cricket team as well as the state's women's team in the Women's National Cricket League (WNCL).

SACA's stated aim is to promote and develop the game of cricket in South Australia. The SACA has a membership base of more than 29,000 members and an elected Board which governs the activities of the Association.

In 2009, following negotiations with SACA, SANFL and the AFL, Premier Mike Rann announced that the South Australian Government would make an investment of $450 million to redevelop Adelaide Oval in order to improve amenities and enable Australian rules football to be played there. The following year Treasurer Kevin Foley announced that the government contribution would increase to $535 million. In 2011 53% of SACA members voted in favour of the redevelopment.

In Big Bash League and Women's Big Bash League, it is represented by Adelaide Strikers (Men) and Adelaide Strikers (Women) respectively.

== South Australian Premier Cricket ==
The SA Premier Cricket Competition is the state (metro Adelaide) cricket league of South Australia. The league administers structured competitions ranging from SACA's Ray Sutton Shield competition for Under 13's through to the West End A Grade competition.

=== Clubs ===
There are 13 clubs in the SACA Premier cricket competition. All clubs field four senior teams and 12 of the clubs (University being the notable exception) have four junior teams competing in regular weekend competitions.

- Adelaide Cricket Club (Buffalos)
- Northern Districts Cricket Club (Jets)
- Southern Districts Cricket Club (Stingrays)
- Glenelg Cricket Club (Seahorses)
- Sturt Cricket Club (Blues)
- Kensington Cricket Club (Browns)
- West Torrens Cricket Club (Eagles)
- Woodville Cricket Club (Peckers)
- Prospect Cricket Club (Pirates)
- East Torrens Cricket Club (Reds)
- Tea Tree Gully Cricket Club (Bulls)
- Port Adelaide Cricket Club (Magpies)
- Adelaide University Cricket Club (Blacks)

== Metropolitan Community Cricket ==
=== Adelaide Turf Cricket Association ===
The Adelaide Turf Cricket Association is the Premier Amateur Turf cricket league in the Greater Adelaide Metropolitan Area since registration with SACA on 26 October 1932. The Association has 51 affiliated clubs including the Adelaide Turf Cricket Umpires Association. The Association has multiple competitions for men, women and juniors. For Men and Boys, the competitions range from Under 10's through to the A1 Kookaburra Sports Premier Grade, these competitions range from strictly One-Day or Two-Day, or Hybrid of One and Two-Day matches, including weekday T20 Competitions. For Women the competitions are Hybrid T20 and One-Day in Two Grades.

=== Para Districts Cricket Association ===
The PDCA was formed in 1958 to cater for cricket at all levels within the Salisbury, Playford and Gawler councils. The Association has been growing steadily and now features both men's and women's senior competitions for the local community.

=== Adelaide & Suburban Cricket Association ===
The ASCA is a hard-wicket competition played on Saturday afternoon. The Association features clubs predominantly from the southern, central suburbs and over 70 teams competing across a variety of different grades

== South Australian Premier League ==
In 2013, SACA launched the SACA Premier League consisting of four South Australian teams, Papua New Guinea Barramundis and Northern Territory Strike. The league was designed to further expose the top players from the SACA grade competition to better cricket and also offering international development for PNG along with a pathway for players from the Northern Territory. The league was re-named the West End Redbacks League in 2016.
