= Port Adelaide Cricket Club =

Cricket club in Adelaide, South Australia

Port Adelaide Magpies

Team information
- Colors: White & Black
- Founded: 1893
- Home ground: Port Reserve

Port Adelaide Cricket Club is a cricket club in Adelaide, South Australia. Its home oval is the Port Reserve, Port Adelaide.

The club was founded in 1893. Port Adelaide has played in the South Australian Grade Cricket League since 1897.

== History ==
Newspaper records show that a Port Adelaide cricket team existed in the early 1860s. The team competed briefly in the Adelaide Suburban Cricket Association before forming a local league, the Port Adelaide Cricket Association in 1882–83.

William Whitridge proposed Port Adelaide at the annual meeting of the SACA in September 1885 but the motion was defeated due to the lack of available grounds. They were admitted for season 1893–94, and in 1896 combined with the Australs to play as Port-Australs for one final season.

The club was officially formed at a meeting at the Friendly Societies' Room in July 1897.

== SA A-Grade Cricket Premierships ==
- 1927–28
- 1928–29
- 1929–30
- 1967–68
- 2013–14
- 2023–24

== International representatives ==
=== Test Cricket ===
Port Adelaide Cricket Club members who have played test cricket include

- Mark Benson (England men)
- Phillip DeFreitas (England men)
- Annette Fellows (Australia women
- Eric Freeman (Australia men)
- Lyn Fullston (Australia women)
- Algy Gehrs (Australia men)
- Neil Hawke (Australia men)
- Ernie Jones (Australia men)
- Brendon Julian (Australia men) (at the Australian Cricket Academy, Henley Beach, South Australia)
- Justin Langer (Australia men) (at the Australian Cricket Academy, Henley Beach, South Australia)
- Jack O'Connor(Australia men)
- Karen Rolton (Australia women)
- Emma Sampson (Australia women)
- Sarah Taylor (England Women)
- Isabelle Tsakiris (Australia women)
- Tim Wall (Australia men)
- Jason Roy (England men) World Cup Winner
