= Glenelg Cricket Club =

Australian Grade Cricket team

Glenelg District Cricket Club (the "Seahorses") are a Grade Cricket team located in Adelaide, South Australia. The club was founded in 1907. Their official website is http://www.gdcc.net.au

Glenelg competes in the South Australian Grade Cricket League, a competition administered by the South Australian Cricket Association. A-grade players in this competition vie for selection in South Australia's Sheffield Shield team, which leads to possible selection in the Australian Cricket team.

The club currently fields 4 senior and 6 junior teams, using ACH Group Stadium, Camden Oval, Adelaide High School and Bowker Street Oval as their home grounds across the grades.

The club is situated in the trendy beachside suburb of Glenelg, with its headquarters being less than a kilometre from Glenelg Beach and the well-known Jetty Road precinct.

== Records ==
Glenelg has won A-grade premierships in the two-day competition in: 1930/31, 1947/48, 1951/52, 1953/54, 1973/74, 2012/13

The club has won A-grade one-day premierships in: 1969/70, 1974/75, 1989/90, 1996/97, 2004/05, 2008/09, 2010/11, 2015/16

The club has won A-grade T20 premierships in: 2014/15

== Notable players ==
The Club has hosted and nurtured some very notable local, interstate and international players in the past, including two Australian Test Cricket captains, brothers Ian and Greg Chappell.

Other notable players include:

- Andrew Hilditch
- Graeme Hole
- Ashley Mallett
- Trevor Chappell
- Geff Noblet
- David Sincock
- Gavin Stevens
- Mervyn Waite
- Bill Whitty
- Jack Crawford (England)
- Monty Panesar (England)
- John Davison (Canada)
- Joel Garner (West Indies)

Glenelg currently has two members of the Southern Redbacks squad; fast bowler Chadd Sayers, and wicketkeeper Alex Carey. Carey is also a member of the Adelaide Strikers squad. Former South Australian and South African captain & all-rounder Johan Botha, and former First Class cricketer, Tom Plant also play for Glenelg. Botha is also currently a member of the Sydney Sixers squad.

Between 1987 and 2004 many players came from interstate to play for Glenelg because of its close proximity to the former Australian Cricket Academy in Henley Beach, including Shane Warne and Michael Bevan.
