= Adelaide University Cricket Club =

Amateur cricket club in Adelaide, South Australia, Australia

AUCC
- Full name: Adelaide University Cricket Club
- Nicknames: The Blacks
- Sport: Cricket
- Founded: 1907
- First season: 1908/09
- League: South Australian Cricket Association; Invervarsity
- Division: Premier Cricket
- Based in: Adelaide
- Home ground: University Oval
- Colours: Black, White
- President: Stephen Dickinson
- Chairman: Lachlan Coleman
- Head coach: Ben Hilliard
- Secretary: Martin Southern
- Captain: Ben Wakim
- Website: Official website

The Adelaide University Cricket Club is an amateur cricket club based in Adelaide, South Australia. It is an affiliate of the Adelaide University Sports Association and plays in the Premier League of the South Australian Cricket Association. Although the club is associated with the University of Adelaide, players do not have to be students. Home matches are played at University Oval.
