= South Australian Premier Cricket =

Australian cricket league

South Australian Premier Cricket (previously known as South Australian District Cricket and South Australian Grade Cricket) is the semi-professional State league based in metropolitan Adelaide, South Australia. It is currently the highest level of cricket played in South Australia outside first-class cricket. The league is administered by the South Australian Cricket Association (SACA), which is the organisation responsible for promoting and developing the game of cricket in South Australia.

== Competitions ==
There are 13 clubs in the SACA Premier cricket competition.

All clubs field four Men's senior teams and 12 of the clubs have four junior teams competing in regular weekend competitions. Most clubs also field at least 1 Women's team in 1st and/or 2nd Grade Women's Cricket with some also fielding sides in the Adelaide Turf Cricket Association Women's Competition. Clubs have teams involved in various competitions including:

- West End Premier Cricket 1st Grade; Premium State cricket competition over two divisions as of 2023/24;
- West End Premier Cricket 2nd, 3rd, 4th Grade; Combination of Two-Day and One-Day Matches. From 2024/25 season 4th Grade has become a One-Day Competition Only.
- Statewide Super Women's Premier Competition; Premier Women's cricket competition of 2 grades playing 50-over and T20 competitions;
- West End Cup; one-day competition;
- West End Twenty20 Cup, Twenty20 competition.
- U18 Shield; Under 18 one-day competition. Played on weekdays during the Summer school holidays.
- Under 15.5 (from 2024/25 season)
- Under 14 (from 2024/25 season)
- Ray Sutton Shield; Under 13s one-day competition, Premium Primary school competition.
- Under 17 (new limited short form competition for 23/24 season) played mainly on Sunday afternoons

Previous Junior Competitions prior to 2024-25 season

- Under 16s, Reds (1st XI) and Whites (2nd XI) competition. Premium Underage competition;
- Under 14s, Reds (1st XI) and Whites (2nd XI) competition. Premium Youth Development competition;

== South Australian Premier Cricket Teams ==
Adelaide
(Adelaide Buffalos)

Adelaide University
(Adelaide University Blacks)

East Torrens
(Eastern Reds)

Glenelg
(Glenelg Seahorses)

Kensington
(Kensington Browns)

Port Adelaide
(Port Adelaide Magpies)

Prospect
(Prospect Pirates)

Northern Districts
(Northern Jets)

Southern Districts
(Southern Stingrays)

Sturt
(Sturt Blues)*

Tea Tree Gully
(Tea Tree Gully Bulls)

West Torrens
(West Torrens Eagles)*

Woodville
(Woodville Peckers)

- – Sturt CC formerly Unley CC
- – West Torrens CC formerly Hindmarsh CC

Locations of Clubs

Locations of the SACA Premier Cricket clubs

== 1st Grade Premierships ==
The 1st Grade competition has been contested since the 1873–1874 season, and the "District", or electorate, club system since 1897–1898. The following list shows the premiership side for each season.

1st Grade Premierships
Season	1st Grade Premiers (Men)	1st Grade Premiers (Women)
1873–1874	Norwood	
1874–1875	Kensington	
1875–1876	Norwood	
1876–1877	Norwood	
1877–1878	Norwood	
1878–1879	Norwood	
1879–1880	North Adelaide	
1880–1881	Hindmarsh	
1881–1882	Norwood	
1882–1883	Norwood	
1883–1884	Hindmarsh	
1884–1885	Norwood	
1885–1886	Norwood	
1886–1887	Norwood	
1887–1888	Norwood	
1888–1889	Norwood	
1889–1890	Norwood	
1890–1891	Norwood	
1891–1892	Norwood	
1892–1893	South Adelaide	
1893–1894	South Adelaide	
1894–1895	North Adelaide	
1895–1896	North Adelaide	
1896–1897	Norwood	
1897–1898	East Torrens	
1898–1899	East Adelaide	
1899–1900	East Adelaide	
1900–1901	East Adelaide	
1901–1902	North Adelaide	
1902–1903	Sturt	
1903–1904	North Adelaide	
1904–1905	Sturt	
1905–1906	Adelaide	
1906–1907	Sturt	
1907–1908	North Adelaide	
1908–1909	East Torrens	
1909–1910	East Torrens	
1910–1911	North Adelaide	
1911–1912	East Torrens	
1912–1913	East Torrens	
1913–1914	East Torrens	
1914–1915	Adelaide	
1915–1916	No Matches due to WWI	
1916–1917	No Matches due to WWI	
1917–1918	No Matches due to WWI	
1918–1919	No Matches due to WWI	
1919–1920	East Torrens	
1920–1921	East Torrens	
1921–1922	East Torrens	
1922–1923	East Torrens	
1923–1924	East Torrens	
1924–1925	Sturt	
1925–1926	University	
1926–1927	Kensington	
1927–1928	Port Adelaide	
1928–1929	Port Adelaide	
1929–1930	Port Adelaide	
1930–1931	Glenelg	Coo-ee
1931–1932	Sturt	Batchelor Girls
1932–1933	West Torrens	Waratah
1933–1934	East Torrens	YWCA A2
1934–1935	East Torrens	Waratah
1935–1936	West Torrens	Waratah
1936–1937	West Torrens	YWCA Blue
1937–1938	Adelaide	YWCA Blue
1938–1939	West Torrens	YWCA Blue
1939–1940	West Torrens	YWCA Red
1940–1941	West Torrens	YWCA Red
1941–1942	West Torrens	
1942–1943	Competition Not Held	
1943–1944	Prospect	
1944–1945	Prospect	
1945–1946	Kensington	
1946–1947	Sturt	YWCA Gold
1947–1948	Glenelg	YWCA Green
1948–1949	Sturt	Eencee Seniors
1949–1950	Sturt	Eencee Seniors
1950–1951	Sturt	Eencee Seniors
1951–1952	Glenelg	Eencee Seniors
1952–1953	Kensington	Eencee Seniors
1953–1954	Glenelg	Kiwi
1954–1955	West Torrens	Kiwi
1955–1956	Sturt	Windsor
1956–1957	West Torrens	Windsor
1957–1958	West Torrens	Windsor
1958–1959	Adelaide	Kiwi
1959–1960	Kensington	Kiwi
1960–1961	Prospect	Graduands
1961–1962	West Torrens	York
1962–1963	Prospect	York
1963–1964	Prospect	Windsor
1964–1965	Kensington	Olympic
1965–1966	Woodville	Olympic
1966–1967	Prospect	Kiwi
1967–1968	Port Adelaide	Kiwi
1968–1969	Prospect	Kiwi
1969–1970	Prospect	Eencee
1970–1971	Prospect	Eencee
1971–1972	Kensington	Kiwi
1972–1973	Kensington	Eencee
1973–1974	Glenelg	Kiwi
1974–1975	Adelaide	Kiwi
1975–1976	East Torrens	Kiwi
1976–1977	Salisbury	Eencee
1977–1978	Woodville	Adelaide CAE
1978–1979	Sturt	Adelaide CAE
1979–1980	Kensington	Hermes
1980–1981	Salisbury	Adelaide CAE
1981–1982	Salisbury	Adelaide CAE
1982–1983	Kensington	YWCA Gold
1983–1984	Salisbury	Adelaide CAE
1984–1985	East Torrens	Adelaide CAE
1985–1986	Kensington	Olympic
1986–1987	Salisbury	
1987–1988	Salisbury	
1988–1989	Salisbury	
1989–1990	Sturt	
1990–1991	East Torrens	
1991–1992	Salisbury	
1992–1993	University	
1993–1994	Salisbury	
1994–1995	University	Salisbury
1995–1996	Tea Tree Gully	Salisbury
1996–1997	Kensington	Fulham
1997–1998	University	Northern Districts
1998–1999	Adelaide	Goodwood
1999–2000	Kensington	Goodwood
2000–2001	Prospect	Port Adelaide
2001–2002	Kensington	Port Adelaide
2002–2003	Kensington	Port Adelaide
2003–2004	Adelaide	Port Adelaide
2004–2005	Northern Districts	Flinders University
2005–2006	Sturt	Port Adelaide
2006–2007	West Torrens	Port Adelaide
2007–2008	Woodville	Sturt
2008–2009	Woodville	West Torrens
2009-2010	Sturt	Sturt
2010-2011	Kensington	Sturt
2011-2012	Woodville	Tea Tree Gully/Northern Districts
2012-2013	Glenelg	West Torrens
2013-2014	Port Adelaide	Kensington
2014-2015	Tea Tree Gully	Northern Districts
2015-2016	Southern District	Northern Districts
2016-2017	West Torrens	Kensington
2017-2018	Tea Tree Gully	West Torrens
2018-2019	Kensington	Sturt
2019-2020	Kensington*	Northern Districts
2020-2021	University	Sturt
2021-2022	West Torrens	Kensington
2022-2023	Kensington	Kensington
2023-2024	Port Adelaide	Kensington
2024-2025	Kensington	Kensington

- Kensington were the Minor Premiers, the finals were not played due to COVID-19

== Men's Premierships by Club ==
Club	Premierships	Last Premiership	First season	Last season	Notes
Kensington Cricket Club	19	2024/25	1871/72	Current	
Norwood CC	16	1896/97	1873/74	1896/97	Club disbanded due to introduction of Electorate Cricket in 1897/98.
East Torrens Cricket Club	16	1990/91	1897/98	Current	Club formed on 19 July 1897 with commencement of Electoral Cricket
Sturt Cricket Club	14	2005/06	1897/98	Current	
West Torrens Cricket Club	14	2021/22	1897/98	Current	Formed out of Hindmarsh CC
Prospect Cricket Club	10	2000/01	1928/29	Current	Formed out of North Adelaide CC
Salisbury DCC	9	1993/94	1965/66	1996/97	Merged with Elizabeth DCC to form Northern Districts CC
North Adelaide CC	7	1907/08	1867/68	1927/28	Became Prospect DCC
Adelaide Cricket Club	7	2003/04	1905/06	Current	
Glenelg Cricket Club	6	2012/13	1907/08	Current	
Port Adelaide Cricket Club	6	2023/24	1893/94	Current	
Adelaide University Cricket Club	5	2020/21	1908/09	Current	
Woodville Cricket Club	5	2011/12	1946/47	Current	
East Adelaide CC	3	1900/01	1897/98	1905/06	Merged with West Adelaide CC to become Adelaide CC
Tea Tree Gully Cricket Club	3	2017/18	1983/84	Current	
Hindmarsh CC	2	1883/84	1857/58	1896/97	Became West Torrens DCC
South Adelaide CC	2	1893/94	1875/76	1896/97	
Northern Districts Cricket Club	1	2004/05	1997/98	Current	Formed by merger of Salisbury DCC & Elizabeth DCC
Southern Districts Cricket Club	1	2015/16	1993/94	Current	
West Adelaide CC	0	None	1897/98	1904/05	Merged with East Adelaide CC to become Adelaide CC
Elizabeth DCC	0	None	1993/94	1996/97	Merged with Salisbury DCC to form Northern Districts CC
Student Teachers CC	0	None	1974/75	1982/83	
Teachers College	0	None	1965/66	1973/74	
Thebarton	0	None	1874/75	1874/75	
South Australian	0	None	1873/74	1880/81	
Senior Colts	0	None	1951/52	1960/61	

== See also ==
- Grade cricket for like competitions in other states

== Sources ==
- Harte C. (1990) The History of the South Australian Cricket Association, Sports Marketing (Australia): Adelaide. ISBN 0-9587980-3-6.
