= Australian cricket team in 2009–10 =

This article contains information, results and statistics regarding the Australian national cricket team in the 2009 and 2009-10 cricket seasons. Statisticians class the 2009 season and 2009–10 season as those matches played on tours that started between May 2009 and April 2010.

== Player contracts ==
The 2009-10 list was announced on 14 May 2009. Note that uncontracted players are still available to be selected to play for the national cricket team.

Player	Age as at 14 May 2009	State	Test cap	ODI cap	ODI shirt
Ricky Ponting (captain)	34 years, 146 days	TAS	366	123	14
Michael Clarke (vice-captain)	28 years, 42 days	NSW	389	149	23
Doug Bollinger	27 years, 294 days	NSW	405	175	4
Nathan Bracken	31 years, 244 days	NSW	387	142	59
Stuart Clark	33 years, 228 days	NSW	396	153	8
Callum Ferguson	24 years, 174 days	SA	-	171	12
Brad Haddin	31 years, 203 days	NSW	400	144	57
Nathan Hauritz	27 years, 208 days	NSW	390	147	43
Ben Hilfenhaus	26 years, 60 days	TAS	407	161	20
Brad Hodge	34 years, 136 days	VIC	394	154	17
James Hopes	30 years, 202 days	QLD	-	151	39
Phillip Hughes	20 years, 165 days	NSW	408	-	2
David Hussey	31 years, 303 days	VIC	-	167	29
Michael Hussey	33 years, 352 days	WA	393	150	48
Mitchell Johnson	27 years, 193 days	QLD	398	156	25
Simon Katich	33 years, 266 days	NSW	384	143	13
Brett Lee	32 years, 187 days	NSW	383	140	58
Graham Manou	30 years, 21 days	SA	411	180	30
Shaun Marsh	25 years, 309 days	WA	-	165	9
Andrew McDonald	27 years, 333 days	VIC	406	-	35
Marcus North	29 years, 290 days	WA	409	176	26
Peter Siddle	24 years, 170 days	VIC	403	172	10
Andrew Symonds	33 years, 339 days	QLD	388	139	63
Shane Watson	27 years, 331 days	QLD	391	148	33
Cameron White	25 years, 269 days	VIC	402	152	7

== Match summary ==
Format	P	W	L	D	T	NR
Tests	7/8	6	0	1	0	0
One Day International	26/26	20	4	0	0	2
Twenty20 International	5	4	1	0	0	0
Total	38/39	30	5	1	0	2

P = Matches Played/Total Matches, W = Won, L = Lost, D = Drawn, T = Tied, NR = No Result
N.B. Result from All-Star match not included as it was only an exhibition match.

== 2009 season ==
=== Pakistan v Australia in UAE ===
No.	Date	Team 1	Captain 1	Team 2	Captain 2	Venue	Result
ODI Series
ODI 2845	22 April	Australia	Michael Clarke	Pakistan	Younis Khan	Dubai Sports City Cricket Stadium, Dubai	Pakistan by 4 wickets
ODI 2846	24 April	Pakistan	Younis Khan	Australia	Michael Clarke	Dubai Sports City Cricket Stadium, Dubai	Australia by 6 wickets
ODI 2847	27 April	Australia	Michael Clarke	Pakistan	Younis Khan	Sheikh Zayed Cricket Stadium, Abu Dhabi	Australia by 27 runs
ODI 2848	1 May	Pakistan	Younis Khan	Australia	Michael Clarke	Sheikh Zayed Cricket Stadium, Abu Dhabi	Australia by 8 wickets
ODI 2849	3 May	Australia	Michael Clarke	Pakistan	Younis Khan	Sheikh Zayed Cricket Stadium, Abu Dhabi	Pakistan by 7 wickets
Twenty20 Series
T20I 89	7 May	Australia	Brad Haddin	Pakistan	Misbah-ul-Haq	Dubai Sports City Cricket Stadium, Dubai	Pakistan by 7 wickets

- This series was moved from Pakistan to UAE for security reasons.

=== ICC World Twenty20 ===
Group Stage
No.	Date	Team 1	Captain 1	Team 2	Captain 2	Venue	Result
3rd Match	6 June	Australia	Ricky Ponting	West Indies	Chris Gayle	Kennington Oval, London	West Indies by 7 wickets
8th Match	8 June	Australia	Ricky Ponting	Sri Lanka	Kumar Sangakkara	Trent Bridge, Nottingham	Sri Lanka by 6 wickets

=== Tour of England ===
No.	Date	Home Captain	Away Captain	Venue	Result
Test Series (The 2009 Ashes)
Test 1922	8–12 July	Andrew Strauss	Ricky Ponting	Sophia Gardens, Cardiff	Match Drawn
Test 1925	16–20 July	Andrew Strauss	Ricky Ponting	Lord's Cricket Ground, London	England won by 115 runs
Test 1928	30 July-3 August	Andrew Strauss	Ricky Ponting	Edgbaston Cricket Ground, Birmingham	Match Drawn
Test 1929	7–11 August	Andrew Strauss	Ricky Ponting	Headingley Cricket Ground, Leeds	Australia won by an innings and 80 runs
Test 1931	20–24 August	Andrew Strauss	Ricky Ponting	The Oval, London	England won by 197 runs
T20I Series
T20I 119	30 August	Paul Collingwood	Michael Clarke	Old Trafford Cricket Ground, Manchester	No Result
T20I 119a	1 September	Paul Collingwood	Michael Clarke	Old Trafford Cricket Ground, Manchester	No Result
ODI Series
ODI 2882	4 September	Andrew Strauss	Michael Clarke	The Oval, London	Australia won by 4 runs
ODI 2883	6 September	Andrew Strauss	Michael Clarke	Lord's Cricket Ground, London	Australia won by 39 runs
ODI 2885	9 September	Andrew Strauss	Michael Clarke	Rose Bowl, Southampton	Australia by 6 wickets
ODI 2888	12 September	Andrew Strauss	Ricky Ponting	Lord's Cricket Ground, London	Australia by 7 wickets
ODI 2890	15 September	Andrew Strauss	Ricky Ponting	Trent Bridge, Nottingham	Australia by 4 wickets
ODI 2891	17 September	Andrew Strauss	Ricky Ponting	Trent Bridge, Nottingham	Australia by 111 runs
ODI 2892	20 September	Andrew Strauss	Ricky Ponting	Riverside Ground, Chester-le-Street	England by 4 wickets

=== Tour of Scotland ===
No.	Date	Home Captain	Away Captain	Venue	Result
ODI Series
ODI 2879	28 August	Gavin Hamilton	Michael Clarke	Raeburn Place, Edinburgh	Australia by 189 runs

== 2009–10 Season ==
=== 2009 ICC Champions Trophy ===
The 2009 ICC Champions Trophy was scheduled to take place in the 2008–09 season in Pakistan, but because of an unstable security situation, it was rescheduled for the 2009–10 season. The hosting rights were also moved from Pakistan to South Africa. Sri Lanka was considered as a potential host, but was discarded due to worries related to the weather during that time of the year in Sri Lanka.

No.	Date	Team 1	Captain 1	Team 2	Captain 2	Venue	Result
Group Stage
5th Match	26 September	Australia	Ricky Ponting	West Indies	Floyd Reifer	New Wanderers Stadium, Johannesburg	Australia by 50 runs
9th Match	28 September	Australia	Ricky Ponting	India	MS Dhoni	SuperSport Park, Centurion	No result
11th Match	30 September	Australia	Ricky Ponting	Pakistan	Younis Khan	SuperSport Park, Centurion	Australia by 2 wickets
Semi-finals
1st Semifinal	2 October	Australia	Ricky Ponting	England	Andrew Strauss	SuperSport Park, Centurion	Australia by 9 wickets
Final
Final	5 October	Australia	Ricky Ponting	New Zealand	Brendon McCullum	SuperSport Park, Centurion	Australia by 6 wickets

=== Tour of India ===
The Australian Cricket Team toured India from 25 October to 11 November 2009. The tour consists of 7 ODIs which Australia won 4–2.

No.	Date	Home Captain	Away Captain	Venue	Result
ODI Series
ODI 2913	25 October	Mahendra Singh Dhoni	Ricky Ponting	Reliance Stadium, Vadodara	Australia by 4 runs
ODI 2915	28 October	Mahendra Singh Dhoni	Ricky Ponting	VCA Stadium, Nagpur	India by 99 runs
ODI 2918	31 October	Mahendra Singh Dhoni	Ricky Ponting	Feroz Shah Kotla, Delhi	India by 6 wickets
ODI 2919	2 November	Mahendra Singh Dhoni	Ricky Ponting	PCA Stadium, Mohali	Australia by 24 runs
ODI 2923	5 November	Mahendra Singh Dhoni	Ricky Ponting	Rajiv Gandhi Stadium, Hyderabad	Australia by 3 runs
ODI 2925	8 November	Mahendra Singh Dhoni	Ricky Ponting	Nehru Stadium, Guwahati	Australia by 6 wickets
ODI 2928a	11 November	Mahendra Singh Dhoni	Ricky Ponting	Brabourne Stadium, Mumbai	Match abandoned without a ball bowled

=== Johnnie Walker All*Star Twenty20 match ===
The Australian Cricket team played an exhibition Twenty20 match against an all star cricket team featuring up and coming first class cricketers and Australian cricket legends to open the 2009/10 summer of international cricket in Australia. The Australian Cricketers' Association (ACA) XI all star team consisted of legends Adam Gilchrist, Matthew Hayden, Glenn McGrath & Shane Warne who is the captain. They were coached by former Australian fast bowler Dennis Lillee.

22 November 2009
Scorecard

Australian XI; 5/173 (20 overs)	v	ACA XI; 9/156 (20 overs)
Cameron White 44* (24); Glenn McGrath 3/18 (4 overs)		Lee Carseldine 41 (31); Clint McKay 3/18 (4 overs)

Australian XI won by 17 runs
The Gabba, Brisbane, Australia
Umpires: Bruce Oxenford and Paul Reiffel
Player of the match: Glenn McGrath

=== West Indies in Australia ===
The tour began with a practice match for the West Indians against Queensland starting 18 November. The first test began on 26 November and the tour will conclude on 23 February with a T20I. In all the tour included one First Class match, one List A match, three Tests, five ODIs and two T20Is.

No.	Date	Home Captain	Away Captain	Venue	Result
Test Series
Test 1936	26–30 November	Ricky Ponting	Chris Gayle	Brisbane Cricket Ground, Brisbane	Australia by an innings and 65 runs
Test 1939	4–8 December	Ricky Ponting	Chris Gayle	Adelaide Oval, Adelaide	Match Drawn
Test 1941	16–20 December	Ricky Ponting	Chris Gayle	WACA Ground, Perth	Australia won by 35 runs
ODI Series
ODI 2950	7 February	Ricky Ponting	Chris Gayle	Melbourne Cricket Ground, Melbourne	Australia won by 113 runs
ODI 2952	9 February	Ricky Ponting	Chris Gayle	Adelaide Oval, Adelaide	Australia won by 8 wickets
ODI 2954	12 February	Ricky Ponting	Chris Gayle	Sydney Cricket Ground, Sydney	No result
ODI 2955	14 February	Ricky Ponting	Chris Gayle	Brisbane Cricket Ground, Brisbane	Australia won by 50 runs
ODI 2960	19 February	Ricky Ponting	Chris Gayle	Melbourne Cricket Ground, Melbourne	Australia won by 125 runs
T20I Series
T20I 146	21 February	Michael Clarke	Chris Gayle	Bellerive Oval, Hobart	Australia won by 38 runs
T20I 147	23 February	Michael Clarke	Chris Gayle	Sydney Cricket Ground, Sydney	Australia won by 8 wickets

=== Pakistan in Australia ===
The tour started on 19 December with a three-day first class match against Tasmania. This was followed on 26 December with the Boxing Day Test match at the MCG. It concluded on 5 February with a T20I at the MCG. In all the tour included three tests, five ODIs and a T20I.

No.	Date	Home Captain	Away Captain	Venue	Result
Test Series
Test 1943	26–30 December	Ricky Ponting	Mohammed Yousuf	Melbourne Cricket Ground, Melbourne	Australia by 170 runs
Test 1945	3–7 January	Ricky Ponting	Mohammad Yousuf	Sydney Cricket Ground, Sydney	Australia by 36 runs
Test 1947	14–18 January	Ricky Ponting	Mohammad Yousuf	Bellerive Oval, Hobart	Australia by 231 runs
ODI Series
ODI 2944	22 January	Ricky Ponting	Mohammad Yousuf	Brisbane Cricket Ground, Brisbane	Australia by 5 wickets
ODI 2945	24 January	Ricky Ponting	Mohammad Yousuf	Sydney Cricket Ground, Sydney	Australia by 140 runs
ODI 2946	26 January	Ricky Ponting	Mohammad Yousuf	Adelaide Oval, Adelaide	Australia by 40 runs
ODI 2947	29 January	Ricky Ponting	Mohammad Yousuf	Western Australia Cricket Association Ground, Perth	Australia by 135 runs
ODI 2948	31 January	Ricky Ponting	Shahid Afridi	Western Australia Cricket Association Ground, Perth	Australia by 2 wickets
T20I Series
T20I 134	5 February	Michael Clarke	Shoaib Malik	Melbourne Cricket Ground, Melbourne	Australia by 2 runs

=== Tour of New Zealand ===
The Australia Cricket Team toured New Zealand from 26 February to 31 March 2010. The tour consisted of 2 Twenty20s, 5 One Day Internationals and 2 Tests.

No.	Date	Home Captain	Away Captain	Venue	Result
Twenty20 Series
T20I 148	26 February	Daniel Vettori	Michael Clarke	Westpac Stadium, Wellington	Australia by 6 wickets
T20I 149	28 February	Daniel Vettori	Michael Clarke	AMI Stadium, Christchurch	Match tied. New Zealand won in Super Over
ODI Series
ODI 2966	3 March	Ross Taylor	Ricky Ponting	McLean Park, Napier	New Zealand won by 2 wickets
ODI 2969	6 March	Daniel Vettori	Ricky Ponting	Eden Park, Auckland	Australia by 12 runs (D/L method)
ODI 2971	9 March	Daniel Vettori	Ricky Ponting	Seddon Park, Hamilton	Australia by 6 wickets
ODI 2973	11 March	Daniel Vettori	Ricky Ponting	Eden Park, Auckland	Australia by 6 wickets (D/L method)
ODI 2975	13 March	Daniel Vettori	Ricky Ponting	Westpac Stadium, Wellington	New Zealand won by 51 runs
Test Series
Test 1955	19–23 March	Daniel Vettori	Ricky Ponting	Basin Reserve, Wellington	Australia by 10 wickets
Test 1957	27–31 March	Daniel Vettori	Ricky Ponting	Seddon Park, Hamilton |	Australia by 176 runs

== See also ==
- Australia national cricket team
