= South African cricket team in Australia in 2012–13 =

	Australia	South Africa
- Dates: 2 November 2012 – 3 December 2012
Captains	Michael Clarke	Graeme Smith

Test series
- Result: South Africa won the 3-match series 1–0
Most runs	Hashim Amla (377)	Michael Clarke (576)
Most wickets	Morne Morkel (14)	Nathan Lyon (12)
- Player of the series: Michael Clarke (Aus)

The South African cricket team toured Australia from 2 November to 3 December 2012. The tour consisted of three Test matches. The test series was preceded by one first class match between the South Africans and the Australian A squad. Michael Clarke became the first man to score four double-centuries in a calendar year, when he passed the 200-run mark in the first innings of the second Test in Adelaide. It was the last series played by former Australian captain Ricky Ponting, who retired after the third Test.

South Africa completed a 1-0 win over Australia after the first two tests were drawn, retaining their number one position in the ICC Test Match rankings.

== Squads ==
South Africa announced their squad on 10 October 2012 and dropped quick Lonwabo Tsotsobe for all-rounder Rory Kleinveldt. Australia announced a squad for the first test match at the Gabba on 28 October 2012. Brad Haddin was overlooked in favour of the younger Matthew Wade. In a Sheffield Shield match, Shane Watson injured his calf and was ruled out of the first test, and was replaced by Rob Quiney who made his test debut. Dean Elgar replaced JP Duminy after he was injured in the first test.

Tests
Australia	South Africa
Michael Clarke (c); Shane Watson (vc); David Warner; Ricky Ponting; Michael Hussey; Ed Cowan; Matthew Wade (wk); Peter Siddle; James Pattinson; Ben Hilfenhaus; Nathan Lyon; Mitchell Starc; Rob Quiney; John Hastings; Mitchell Johnson; Josh Hazlewood	Graeme Smith (c); AB de Villiers (vc, wk); Hashim Amla; JP Duminy; Faf du Plessis; Imran Tahir; Jacques Kallis; Rory Kleinveldt; Morne Morkel; Alviro Petersen; Robin Peterson; Vernon Philander; Jacques Rudolph; Dale Steyn; Thami Tsolekile (wk); Dean Elgar

== Tour matches ==
=== First class: Australia A v South Africans ===
2–4 November 2012
Scorecard

Australia A	v	South Africans
7/480d (135 overs); Alex Doolan 161* (275); Dale Steyn 3/54 (22 overs)		6/277d (105 overs); Graeme Smith 60 (84); Glenn Maxwell 2/70 (24 overs)
1/13 (10 overs); Rob Quiney 11* (22); Dale Steyn 1/4 (5 overs)

Match drawn
Sydney Cricket Ground, Sydney
Umpires: Simon Fry (Aus) and Paul Reiffel (Aus)

- Australia A won the toss and elected to bat
- Graeme Smith and Hashim Amla retired out on 60 and 53 respectively

== Test series ==
=== 1st Test ===
9–13 November 2012
Scorecard

South Africa	v	Australia
450 (151.4 overs); Jacques Kallis 147 (274); James Pattinson 3/93 (34 overs)		5/565d (138 overs); Michael Clarke 259* (398); Morne Morkel 3/127 (31 overs)
5/166 (68 overs); Jacques Kallis 49 (91); Nathan Lyon 2/41 (13 overs)

Match drawn
Brisbane Cricket Ground, Brisbane
Umpires: Billy Bowden (NZ) and Asad Rauf (Pak)
Player of the match: Michael Clarke (Aus)

- South Africa won the toss and elected to bat
- Match delayed by bad light on Day 1, 8 overs lost
- No play on Day 2 was possible due to rain
- JP Duminy was unable to bat or bowl due to injury
- Test debuts: Rob Quiney (Aus) and Rory Kleinveldt (SA)

Match Report:

Taking different approaches to the match, South Africa opted to leave spinner Imran Tahir out of the starting eleven, playing debutant fast bowler Rory Kleinveldt and going into the match without a frontline spinner; Australia omitted fourth pace bowler Mitchell Starc in favour of spinner Nathan Lyon. Australian batsman Rob Quiney made his Test debut, replacing Shane Watson who suffered a calf injury in the lead-up to the game.

Day 1

South Africa won the toss and elected to bat. After losing Graeme Smith early, South Africa batted strongly on Day 1, taking its score to 2/255 before bad light ended play. Alviro Petersen scored 64, and Hashim Amla and Jacques Kallis were not out on 90 and 84 respectively at stumps.

During a warm down activity after stumps, JP Duminy ruptured his left Achilles tendon, leaving him unable to participate in the rest of the match.

Day 2

Day 2 of the Test match was abandoned without a ball being bowled due to rain. It was the first time since the Boxing Day test in 1998 that a whole day of test cricket had been abandoned in Australia, and the first time since 1983 that it had occurred in a Brisbane Test.

Day 3

Resuming at 2/255, the partnership between Hashim Amla and Jacques Kallis was reached 165 runs before Amla was dismissed for 104. Kallis (147) added a further 90 runs with Jacques Rudolph (40), before Kallis was dismissed with the score at 4/374. South Africa lost the rest of its wickets for 76 runs, and was all out for 450 shortly after tea. The wickets were shared amongst the Australian bowlers, James Pattinson taking the best figures of 3/93.

Morne Morkel and Dale Steyn took early wickets to reduce Australia to 3/40 inside the first ten overs. Opener Ed Cowan and captain Michael Clarke then recovered to take Australia to 3/111 at stumps.

Day 4

Australia dominated with the bat on Day 4. Ed Cowan and Michael Clarke batted together until shortly before the tea break, for a fourth wicket partnership of 259, and Cowan made his maiden Test century, before Cowan was dismissed for 136. Clarke and Mike Hussey then batted together through the evening session to take the total to 4/487 at stumps, with Clarke finishing 218*, to score his third double-century of the year. Altogether, Australia scored 376 runs on Day 4, and the only wicket to fall was to a run out.

Day 5

Australia declared at 5/565 before lunch, with Michael Clarke on 259* and Mike Hussey out for 100, for a lead of 115 runs. South Africa reached 5/166, with Jacques Kallis (49) top scoring, and the match was drawn.

The man of the match award went to Michael Clarke for his unbeaten double century.

=== 2nd Test ===
22–26 November 2012
Scorecard

Australia	v	South Africa
550 (107.2 overs); Michael Clarke 230 (257); Morne Morkel 5/146 (30 overs)		388 (124.3 overs); Graeme Smith 122 (244); Ben Hilfenhaus 3/49 (19.3 overs)
8/267d (70 overs); Michael Hussey 54 (95); Morne Morkel 3/50 (19 overs)		8/248 (148 overs); Faf du Plessis 110* (376); Peter Siddle 4/65 (33 overs)

Match drawn
Adelaide Oval, Adelaide
Umpires: Billy Bowden (NZ) and Richard Kettleborough (Eng)
Player of the match: Faf du Plessis (SA)

- Australia won the toss and elected to bat
- Faf du Plessis (SA) made his Test debut.
- Michael Clarke became the first ever batsman to score 4 double centuries in a year with his 230
- Imran Tahir (SA) returned the worst bowling figures in a Test match with his 0/260.

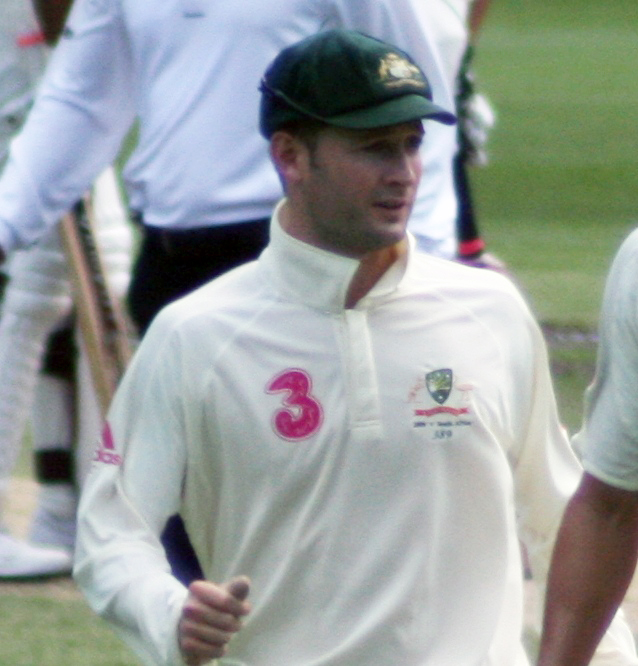
Michael Clarke made back to back double centuries.

Match Report:

Day 1

Australia won the toss and elected to bat. South Africa made a surprise change with Vernon Philander out with a sore back and Rory Kleinveldt replacing him. Shane Watson was unable to prove his fitness, which left Australia unchanged.

South Africa took early wickets to reduce Australia to 3/55, before David Warner and Michael Clarke compiled a 155 run partnership. Warner scored his third test century before being dismissed for 119. Clarke and Mike Hussey then added 272 for the fifth wicket; Clarke finished the day on 224 not out, to become the first cricketer to score four double-centuries in a calendar year, and Hussey was dismissed for 103 on the final ball of the day. At stumps Australia was 5/482, the second highest score on the first day of a Test match. Jacques Kallis suffered an upper hamstring injury and could not bowl for the rest of the match.

Day 2

Australia added 68 runs for its final five wickets on the morning of Day 2 to finish all out for 550, with Clarke dismissed for 230, and James Pattinson scoring a valuable 42. Morne Morkel took 5 wickets for 146 runs.

In reply, South Africa started well with a 138 run opening stand, before Alviro Petersen (54) was run out; Graeme Smith finished the day 111 not out, and South Africa were 2/217 at stumps.

Day 3

South Africa lost early wickets, including Graeme Smith (122), and collapsed to 7/250. Debutant Faf du Plessis (78) and Jacques Kallis (58) who was batting at No. 9 due to his injury, scored 93 runs for the eighth wicket, and South Africa finished all out for 388, a deficit of 162 runs.

The Australian openers scored 77 runs, before the South African pace attack took 5/26 late in the day. At stumps, Australia was 5/111, a lead of 273 runs.

Day 4

Australia batted solidly through the morning of Day 4, taking the score to 8/267 before declaring midway through the afternoon session, setting a huge target of 430. Mike Hussey (54) top-scored for Australia. South Africa's was reduced to 4/45 shortly after tea, before AB de Villiers and Faf du Plessis batted very defensively until the end of play. At stumps South Africa was 4/77, scoring at a rate of just 1.5 runs per over, and still needing 353 runs for victory.

Day 5

South Africa batted with an entirely defensive mindset on Day 5 to save the match, while Australia sought six wickets for victory. An injury to James Pattinson earlier in the match left Australia with only three front-line bowlers for the second innings. By the drinks break in the evening session, Australia had managed only two wickets – de Villiers (33) and Kallis (46) – to leave South Africa 6/233, and to leave du Plessis to bat out the final hour of play with the tail-enders. A fatigued Peter Siddle took two wickets in the final hour, for an innings total of 4/65, but South Africa held on to secure a draw. Du Plessis occupied the crease for a total of 376 deliveries, and scored his maiden Test century (110*) on debut. South Africa's final total was 8/248, scored in 148 overs at a very defensive run rate of 1.67.

Du Plessis was named Man of the Match in his debut test, for his match-saving second innings 110* off 376 deliveries, as well as his first innings score of 78.

=== 3rd Test ===
30 Nov-3 Dec
Scorecard

South Africa	v	Australia
225 (74 overs); Faf du Plessis 78* (142); Nathan Lyon 3/41 (12 overs)		163 (53.1 overs); Matthew Wade 68 (102); Dale Steyn 4/40 (16 overs)
569 (111.5 overs); Hashim Amla 196 (221); Mitchell Starc 6/154 (28.5 overs)		322 (82.5 overs); Mitchell Starc 68* (43); Dale Steyn 3/72 (22.5 overs)

South Africa won by 309 runs
Western Australia Cricket Association Ground, Perth
Umpires: Asad Rauf (Pak) and Richard Kettleborough (Eng)
Player of the match: Hashim Amla (SA)

- South Africa won the toss and elected to bat
- Test debuts: John Hastings (Aus) and Dean Elgar (SA)

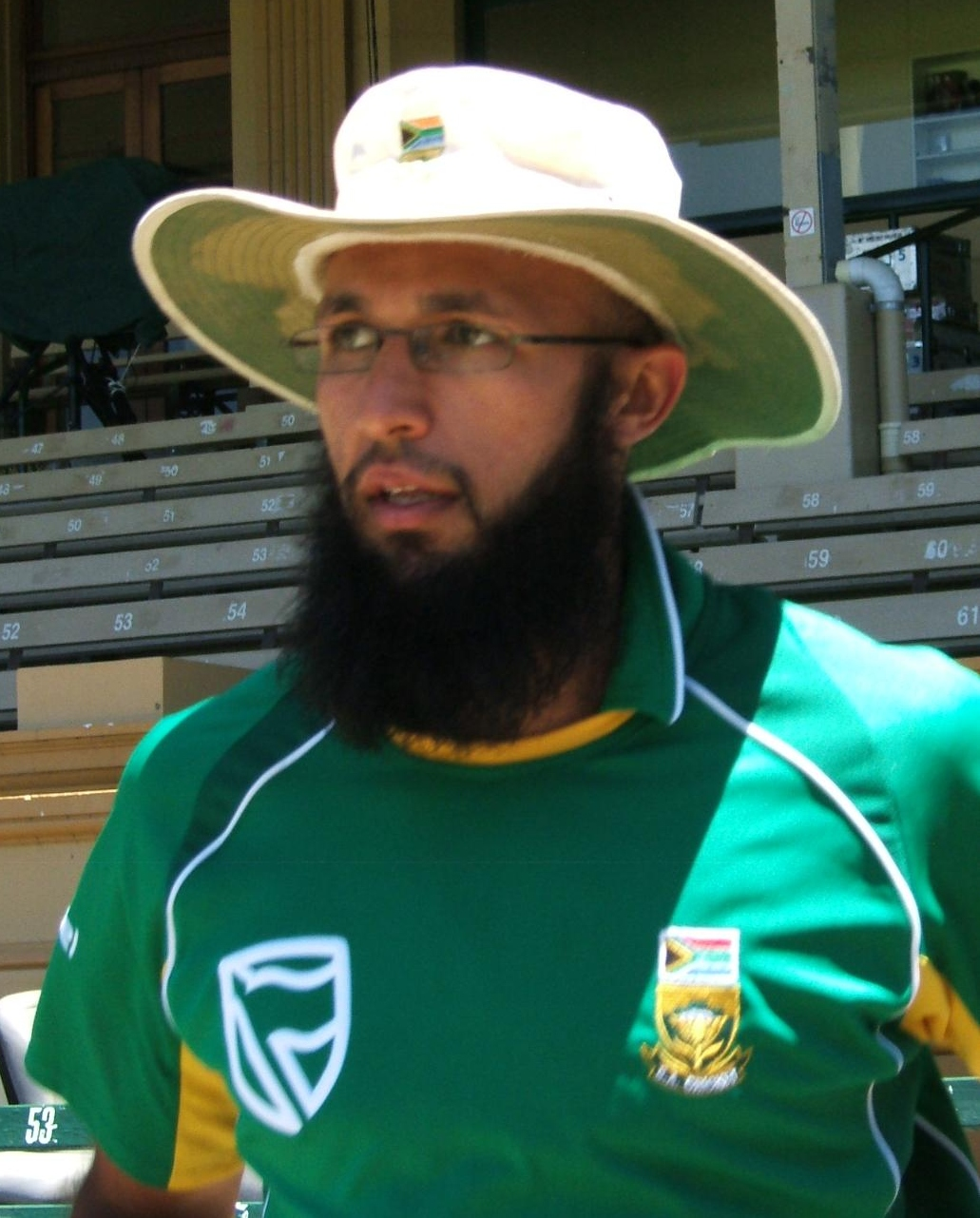
Hashim Amla was just 4 runs shy of his 3rd double ton.

Match Report:

In the lead-up to the third Test, former Australian captain Ricky Ponting announced that he would retire at the end of series. Both countries made several changes to the teams which had finished the second Test three days earlier. For South Africa, debutant batsman Dean Elgar replaced Jacques Rudolph, fast bowler Vernon Philander replaced Rory Kleinveldt, and spinner Robin Peterson replaced Imran Tahir. For Australia, vice captain Shane Watson was back from injury and replaced Rob Quiney; fast bowlers Ben Hilfenhaus and Peter Siddle were rested after heavy workloads in the second Test, and James Pattinson was injured; they were replaced by Mitchell Johnson, Mitchell Starc and debutant John Hastings. This was the first time since 1885 that the Australian team changed its entire seam attack between Tests.

Day 1

South Africa won the toss and chose to bat. They reached 1/61 before losing two wickets just before lunch, and collapsed to 6/75 after lunch. There was resistance from Francois du Plessis (78 not out) and the tail, and South Africa was dismissed for 225 during the evening session. Australia faced 14 overs before stumps, and lost two early wickets. At stumps Australia was 2/33, trailing by 192 runs.

Day 2

South Africa made a strong start on Day 2, taking four Australian wickets inside the first hour to reduce Australia to 6/45. Matthew Wade (68) and John Hastings (32) provided resistance, and Australia was dismissed for 163 shortly before tea, a deficit of 62 runs. Dale Steyn (4/40) was South Africa's best bowler, taking three of his four wickets during Australia's first hour collapse. In reply, South Africa dominated the evening session, and at stumps had taken its score to 2/230 in only 38 overs, at a run rate of 6.05, and for an overall lead of 292. Graeme Smith (84) and Hashim Amla (99 not out at stumps) added 178 runs for the second wicket.

Day 3

Hashim Amla scored his 18th century shortly after the start of play, and South Africa only lost one wicket in the morning session, that of Jacques Kallis (37). After lunch, South Africa completely dominated Australia with Amla (196) and AB de Villiers (169) both scoring big centuries. South Africa batted aggressively after tea, and was bowled out for 569, setting Australia a target of 632 runs to win. Mitchell Starc (6/154) took the first five-wicket haul of his Test career, and Mitchell Johnson took four wickets. The Australian openers survived fourteen overs before stumps and required 592 runs for victory at the end of the day.

Day 4

South Africa made another good start to the day by taking three wickets before lunch including the one of Ricky Ponting, who was dismissed for just 8 in his final test innings. Wickets continued to fall regularly through the day, and Australia was eventually dismissed for 322 during the evening session. Number ten batsman Mitchell Starc top-scored with 68*; Dale Steyn and Robin Peterson each took three wickets.

The Man of the Match award went to Hashim Amla for his second innings total of 196. The Man of the Series award went to Michael Clarke for his 576 runs in the series which included two double centuries.

== Broadcasters ==
Country	TV Broadcaster(s)
Australia	Nine Network
Australia	Fox Sports
New Zealand	Sky Sport
United Kingdom	Sky Sports
India	STAR Cricket
Pakistan	PTV Sports
South Africa	SuperSport
