= Australian cricket team in Bangladesh in 2005–06 =

International cricket tour

	Australia	Bangladesh
- Dates: 9 April – 28 April 2006
Captains	Ricky Ponting	Habibul Bashar

Test series
- Result: Australia won the 2-match series 2–0
Most runs	Michael Hussey (242)	Shahriar Nafees (250)
Most wickets	Stuart MacGill (16)	Mohammad Rafique (11)
- Player of the series: Jason Gillespie

One Day International series
- Results: Australia won the 3-match series 3–0
Most runs	Adam Gilchrist (108)	Habibul Bashar (155)
Most wickets	Brad Hogg (9)	Abdur Razzak (5)
- Player of the series: Brad Hogg

The Australian cricket team ended the 2005–06 season by touring Bangladesh in April 2006. The series was seen as an uneventful way to end the season as Australia, who were twenty points clear of second place in the ICC Test Championship, played a Bangladeshi team who had won one Test match in their cricketing history and were ranked at the bottom, over 100 points behind Australia. Bangladesh, however, wanted to refute comments made by the tourists' captain, Ricky Ponting who told London's The Daily Telegraph in February "What I would not have is the minnow nations in the World Cup and the Champions Trophy, and I would not have Bangladesh and Zimbabwe playing Tests at present." On arrival, Ponting pointed out, in support of the home side, that "maybe Bangladesh having Test status will take the game forward". On the back of a three-Test whitewash tour of South Africa, but a 3–2 loss in ODI matches (including the famous fifth ODI, in which Australia scored a world record of 4/434, only for South Africa to chase it down with a world record 9/438), Australia came to Bangladesh to play two Tests and three One-day International matches, without any warm-up touring matches.

Australia won the two-Test series 2–0. Australia won a close first Test by three wickets after Bangladesh nearly caused a massive upset; Australia comfortably won the second Test by an innings and 80 runs in a match well remembered for Australian fast bowler Jason Gillespie, normally a number ten batsman, scoring a double century after being sent in as a nightwatchman. Australia went on to win the ODI series 3–0.

== Squads ==
Bangladesh		Australia	
Tests	ODIs	Tests	ODIs
Habibul Bashar (c); Khaled Mashud (wk); Javed Omar; Mohammad Rafique; Rajin Saleh; Mohammad Ashraful; Mashrafe Bin Mortaza; Aftab Ahmed; Tushar Imran; Abdur Razzak; Alok Kapali; Shahriar Nafees; Shahadat Hossain; Syed Rasel	Habibul Bashar (c); Khaled Mashud (wk); Javed Omar; Rajin Saleh; Mohammad Ashraful; Shahriar Nafees; Nafees Iqbal; Aftab Ahmed; Alok Kapali; Mohammad Rafique; Enamul Haque Jr; Mashrafe Bin Mortaza; Syed Rasel; Shahadat Hossain	Ricky Ponting (c); Adam Gilchrist (wk); ~~Stuart Clark~~; Michael Clarke; Matthew Hayden; Michael Hussey; ~~Michael Kasprowicz~~; ~~Justin Langer~~; Brett Lee; Stuart MacGill; Damien Martyn; Andrew Symonds; ~~Shaun Tait~~; Shane Warne; Jason Gillespie; Phil Jaques; Mitchell Johnson; Nathan Bracken; Dan Cullen	Ricky Ponting (c); Adam Gilchrist (wk); Nathan Bracken; Michael Clarke; Dan Cullen; Brad Hogg; Michael Hussey; Mitchell Johnson; Simon Katich; Brett Lee; Andrew Symonds; James Hopes; Mark Cosgrove; Brett Dorey

== Venues ==
Fatullah	Chattogram
Fatullah Stadium	Chattogram Cricket Stadium
Capacity: 25,000	Capacity: 20,000

== Test series ==
=== First Test ===
9–13 April 2006
Scorecard

Bangladesh	v	Australia
427 (123.3 overs); Shahriar Nafees 138 (189); SCG MacGill 8–108 (33.3 overs)		269 (95.2 overs); AC Gilchrist 144 (212); Mohammad Rafique 5–62 (32.2 overs)
148 (50 overs); Shahriar Nafees 33 (38); Rajin Saleh 33 (118); JN Gillespie 3–18 (11 overs)		310/7 (107 overs); RT Ponting 118* (253); Mohammad Rafique 4–98 (38 overs)

Australia won by 3 wickets
Khan Shaheb Osman Ali Stadium, Fatullah
Umpires: Aleem Dar (PAK) and Nadeem Ghauri (PAK)
Player of the match: AC Gilchrist (AUS)

- Bangladesh won the toss and elected to bat.

After winning the toss, Habibul Bashar decided to bat and his team initially showed value to Bashar's promise that, despite losing by an innings in both Tests in Australia in 2003, his team would play with conviction. The morning session saw a run rate averaging almost six per over. Opener Javed Omar was caught lbw for 27 by veteran Aussie Jason Gillespie. However, Shahriar Nafees and Bashar then knocked up a partnership that even Shane Warne, who would eventually leave injured with bowling figures of no wickets for 112, could not dismantle - his only chance coming from Adam Gilchrist putting down Bashar for 36 behind the stumps. The pair lasted almost all of the afternoon session, Nafees scoring his first Test century off two consecutive boundaries from Warne, but Brett Lee caught a ball from Stuart MacGill one ball before tea to dismiss the captain. The evening session saw few runs but much wickets as stumps were called at 355 for 5.

Day two began in similar fashion, Bangladesh losing only one wicket in the morning session as Rajin Saleh hit a half-century, but after lunch the team were out for 427 - their second highest total thus far in Test cricket. MacGill picked up a career best of eight for 108 as the last four wickets fell for just 29 runs. Australia took to the wicket with a disheartened spirit, conveyed by Matthew Hayden being lbw for six runs in the third over and Ricky Ponting was trapped the same way for 21. The rest of the team fell thick and fast if it had not been for Adam Gilchrist putting up a fight of 51* as the day closed on 145–6 with the Australians fighting to avoid the follow on. The third day was resumed with Gilchrist and Brett Lee (12) to bat, the latter being the only wicket to fall in the morning. The eighth wicket, aided by Gillespie helped avoid the follow on, with a partnership of 73 in which Gilchrist managed his first Test century for over a year. Stuart Clark came and went for a duck and Gilchrist was caught, leaving the Australians 269 all out and Bangladesh spin bowler Mohammad Rafique with figures of five for 62.

Bangladesh's scores were worse the second time around, as Nafees failed to live up to his previous innings century after making 33, and opener Omar edged to the wicket keeper Gilchrist for 18. Soon the captain was run out for seven and Aftab Ahmed lost his wicket in the final over to see Bangladesh positioned at 124 for 5 at stumps. The fourth day continued in the same vein as Khaled Mashud was bowled for a duck in the second over of the day and both Shane Warne and Jason Gillespie made up for their first innings oversight by bowling and trapping the last five wickets of Bangladeshi for 88 runs, the former improving his previous 0–112 to this innings' 3–28, despite Mohammad Rafique taking three fours off him. Australia started the final innings in the knowledge that they have only twice, in fifty years, managed to pull off a second innings score higher than the first, needing as they did 307 runs for victory. Taking no risks, Australia's openers made a calm 67 either side of the tea break before captain Ricky Ponting came out with seven boundaries and an unbeaten 72 at the close of play. The second wicket partnership stood for 106 before Australian wickets began to tumble with two removals from left-arm slow bowler Mohammad Rafique to leave the team at 212–4, with only their high-scoring skipper and Adam Gilchrist (6*) in the way of their five bowlers at the lower order.

The final morning began poorly for Australia with Mohammad Rafique picking up the wickets of Gilchrist (12) and Warne (5) cheaply to have Australia in trouble at 6-231 still requiring 76 for victory. However, Ponting remained resolute in defence as he uncharacteristically crawled his way towards a century. He was joined by Lee and together they put on 46 for the 7th wicket. But the new ball turned Bangladesh's fortunes and Lee's wicket in the lead up to lunch gave them some hope. Their biggest opportunity came when Ponting skied a pull shot on 98 only to be dropped by Mashrafe Mortaza at fine leg. He proceeded to his 31st test century in the final over before lunch with a cover drive to the fence. Now joined by Gillespie, victory was delayed only by the lunch break. Ponting remained not out on 118. Mohammad Rafique finished with match figures of 9–160. Adam Gilchrist was named man of the match.

=== Second Test ===
16–20 April 2006
Scorecard

Bangladesh	v	Australia
197 (61.2 overs); Rajin Saleh 71 (126); JN Gillespie 3-11 (5 overs)		4/581 dec (152.3 overs); JN Gillespie 201* (425); Mohammad Rafique 2-98 (48.3 overs)
304 (80.2 overs); Shahriar Nafees 79(180); SK Warne 5-113 (36 overs)

Australia won by an innings and 80 runs
Chittagong Divisional Stadium, Chittagong
Umpires: Aleem Dar (PAK) and IL Howell (SA)
Player of the match: JN Gillespie (AUS)

- Bangladesh won the toss and elected to bat.
- DJ Cullen (AUS) and Abdur Razzak (BAN) made their Test debuts.

Day One started as Bangladesh won the toss and elected to bat. Jason Gillespie took three early wickets to reduce Bangladesh to 3/17 inside eight overs; he would finish with figures of 7-8 from 6 overs. Wickets fell regularly through the rest of the innings, and Bangladesh was dismissed for 36 after the tea break. Rajin Saleh top scored for Bangladesh with 19 and Test Debutant Dan Cullen took his first wicket, claiming the scalp of Mashrafe Mortaza. Ricky Ponting was fined 25% of his match fee for failing to respect an umpire's decision and showing dissent, after third umpire Mahbubur Rahman turned down an appeal for caught.

The Australians took to the crease with about 20 overs left in the day. Matthew Hayden was dismissed near stumps, and Jason Gillespie was sent in as nightwatchman. Only 18.4 overs were played on a rain-shortened Day Two, which saw opener Phil Jaques score his maiden Test half-century, before being dismissed for 66. Gillespie and Ricky Ponting were at the crease when play ended, with the score 2/151.

Day Three continued with Ricky Ponting and Jason Gillespie still at the crease. Ponting cruised to his 34th Test half-century before being run out. Michael Hussey then batted with Jason Gillespie for the rest of the day. During the afternoon session, Gillespie reached a century, which was the first in his Test and First-Class career. It also made him the third nightwatchman to make a Test Century, and the longest innings by a nightwatchman, with his century coming from 296 balls. At tea, Gillespie was 102n.o. and Hussey was 93n.o., and play was called off due to persistent rain.

Day Four was played with no disruptions from the weather and 100 overs to be played. Michael Hussey made his 4th Test Century in the fifth over of the day's play. Gillespie and Hussey pushed on to bat making great progress through the day with Hussey punishing the pacemen while Gillespie took on the spinners with great drives and a couple of magnificent sixes. Hussey and Gillespie both reached 150, and compiled a fourth wicket partnership of 320 runs, before Hussey was dismissed for 182 from only 203 deliveries before lunch. Then, shortly after the lunch break, Gillespie reached a double century. His 201 not out came from 425 balls, 574 minutes, and was spread across four days of batting. His second hundred was much faster than his first, coming from only 129 balls. His score is the highest ever by a nightwatchman, and the highest score by an Australian against Bangladesh. Ricky Ponting declared after Gillespie's double century, with the score 2/758, a lead of 749 runs.

After Javed Omar was dismissed in the fifth over, Shahriar Nafees and Habibul Bashar put together a 2 run partnership, before Bashar was dismissed by Shane Warne just before drinks in the evening session. Warne took two more wickets in the day's play to reduce Bangladesh to 8/28 at stumps. Warne and Stuart MacGill then took the remaining six wickets inside the morning session on Day Five. Warne finished with 6/2 and MacGill with 4/20, while Nafees top scored for Bangladesh with 7.

Gillespie was named Man of the Match, with his double century and bowling figures 7/9 and 0/2. Gillespie bowled only nine overs in the match, the fewest of any completed match in his career. (Note: Gillespie bowled only three overs in the 1996–97 Melbourne Test against the West Indies, his second career Test match, but was injured during the game.) It was also the final test match of Gillespie's career after being overlooked for the 2006/07 Ashes series in Australia. Having completed his innings, he scored no more runs & took no more wickets for his career tally.

== ODI series ==
=== First ODI ===
23 April 2006
Scorecard

Bangladesh; 195 (47 overs)	v	Australia; 196/6 (44 overs)
Habibul Bashar 52 (93); Brad Hogg 3/37 (10 overs)		Adam Gilchrist 76 (46); Abdur Razzaq 3/36 (10 overs)

Australia won by 4 wickets
Zohur Ahmed Chowdhury Stadium, Chittagong
Umpires: Ian Howell (RSA) and Mahbubur Rahman (BAN)
Player of the match: Adam Gilchrist

- Bangladesh won the toss and elected to bat

=== Second ODI ===
26 April 2006
Scorecard

Australia; 250/5 (50 overs)	v	Bangladesh; 183 (48 overs)
Andrew Symonds 103* (125); Mashrafe Mortaza 3/54 (9.1 overs)		Habibul Bashar 70* (114); Brad Hogg 3/34 (9 overs)

Australia won by 67 runs
Khan Shaheb Osman Ali Stadium, Fatullah
Umpires: AFM Akhtaruddin (BAN) and Ian Howell (RSA)
Player of the match: Andrew Symonds

- Australia won the toss and elected to bat.

=== Third ODI ===
28 April 2006
Scorecard

Bangladesh; 124 (42.3 overs)	v	Australia; 127/1 (22.4 overs)
Habibul Bashar 33 (50); Brad Hogg 3/17 (6 overs)		Mark Cosgrove 74 (69); Abdur Razzak 1/35 (6.4 overs)

Australia won by 9 wickets
Khan Shaheb Osman Ali Stadium, Fatullah
Umpires: Ian Howell (RSA) and Nadir Shah (BAN)
Player of the match: Mark Cosgrove

- Bangladesh won the toss and elected to bat
