= Dan Cullen =

Australian cricketer

Personal information
- Full name: Daniel James Cullen
- Born: 10 April 1984 (age 42); Woodville, South Australia
- Nickname: Fiery
- Height: 1.83 m (6 ft 0 in)
- Batting: Right-handed
- Bowling: Right-arm off break
- Role: Bowler

International information
- National side: Australia
- Only Test (cap 397): 16 April 2006 v Bangladesh
- ODI debut (cap 159): 23 April 2006 v Bangladesh
- Last ODI: 18 September 2006 v West Indies

Domestic team information
- Years: Team
- 2004/05–2008/09: South Australia
- 2006: Somerset

Career statistics
Competition	Test	ODI	FC	LA
Matches	1	5	46	55
Runs scored	–	2	567	123
Batting average	–	–	15.75	10.25
100s/50s	–	0/0	0/0	0/0
Top score	–	2*	42	27*
Balls bowled	84	213	10,540	2,537
Wickets	1	2	130	56
Bowling average	54.00	73.50	44.28	35.39
5 wickets in innings	0	0	4	0
10 wickets in match	0	0	0	0
Best bowling	1/54	2/25	5/38	3/28
Catches/stumpings	0/–	2/–	10/–	10/–
- Source: ESPNcricinfo, 11 December 2014

Daniel James Cullen (born 10 April 1984) is a former Australian first-class cricketer who played for South Australia and Somerset in a career that lasted from 2004 to 2009. He was a right-arm off break bowler who appeared six times for Australia, and was touted as a promising prospect to replace Shane Warne. However, a number of unproductive seasons meant that he lost his national contract in 2008, and was dropped by South Australia in 2010, ending his first-class career. Cullen was a member of the Australian team that won the 2006 ICC Champions Trophy.

He first appeared for South Australia in 2004, and after two strong seasons for South Australia, he was selected to tour Bangladesh with the national team in April 2006. He made his Test debut when other players were rested, and subsequently played the three ODIs on the tour. The following season, after a string of poor performances, he was replaced in South Australia's first-class team, and although he performed better in 2007–08, his bowling figures continued to wane, and he was eventually dropped from the state side, resulting in the loss of his South Australian contract at the end of the 2009–10 season.

== Cricket career ==
Cullen made his first-class cricket debut in 2004 for South Australia, appearing against Victoria. He claimed four wickets in the match, which South Australia won. His debut season drew the plaudits of Shane Warne, who claimed that Cullen would be "a certainty to play for Australia." He took 43 wickets at an average of 30.37 that year, and the following season he was named as the Bradman Young Cricketer of the Year, despite breaking his finger. After the conclusion of the Australian domestic season, Cullen was selected as part of the Australian squad to face Bangladesh. He did not play in the first Test match, but was called up for the second, as several members of the team were rested due to fatigue. He took one wicket in the match, in which Australia's other two spinners, Warne and Stuart MacGill, took 15 wickets between them. He played in all three of the One Day Internationals (ODIs) on the tour, taking two wickets at an average of 49.

Along with Cameron White, he played for Somerset as their overseas player for the 2006 English cricket season. He had a relatively unproductive spell with the county, taking seven wickets in four matches at an average over 50. He left Somerset early to play in the Top End series for Australia A. He subsequently played in two ODIs during the 2006–07 DLF Cup, but remained wicket-less in both. Despite his early promise, and the positive comments made by Warne and Ricky Ponting, these were Cullen's final appearances for Australia, ending his international career with one Test wicket and two ODI wickets in six matches.

He struggled in 2006–07, and after only taking 13 wickets in the Pura Cup, he was replaced in South Australia's first-class team by Cullen Bailey. He travelled to Pakistan with Australia A in September of that year, and in three List A matches against Pakistan A, he claimed three wickets: the best by any Australian, as they lost all three games. In the first unofficial Test between the sides, Cullen took five wickets in the match to help Australia A to an innings victory. Cullen once again had poor bowling figures during the 2007–08 domestic season in Australia, but he blamed the pitches, claiming that "I compare myself against the spinners in every game and I've pretty much out-bowled the majority." Cricket Australia disagreed, and he lost his national contract at the end of the season. In the 2008–09 season, Cullen took ten first-class wickets at an average of 77.70, The following 2009–10 season, his only appearance came in the Ford Ranger Cup, in which he played against Queensland, bowling six overs without taking a wicket. That was his final appearance for South Australia, ending his career with 130 first-class wickets at an average of 44.28, and 56 List A wickets at 35.39. He lost his contract with South Australia at the end of that season.

== Post-retirement life ==
Dan Cullen now works as a plumber and has also worked as the spin-bowling coach to junior sides of the South Australia Redbacks.
