= Mark Cosgrove =

Australian cricketer

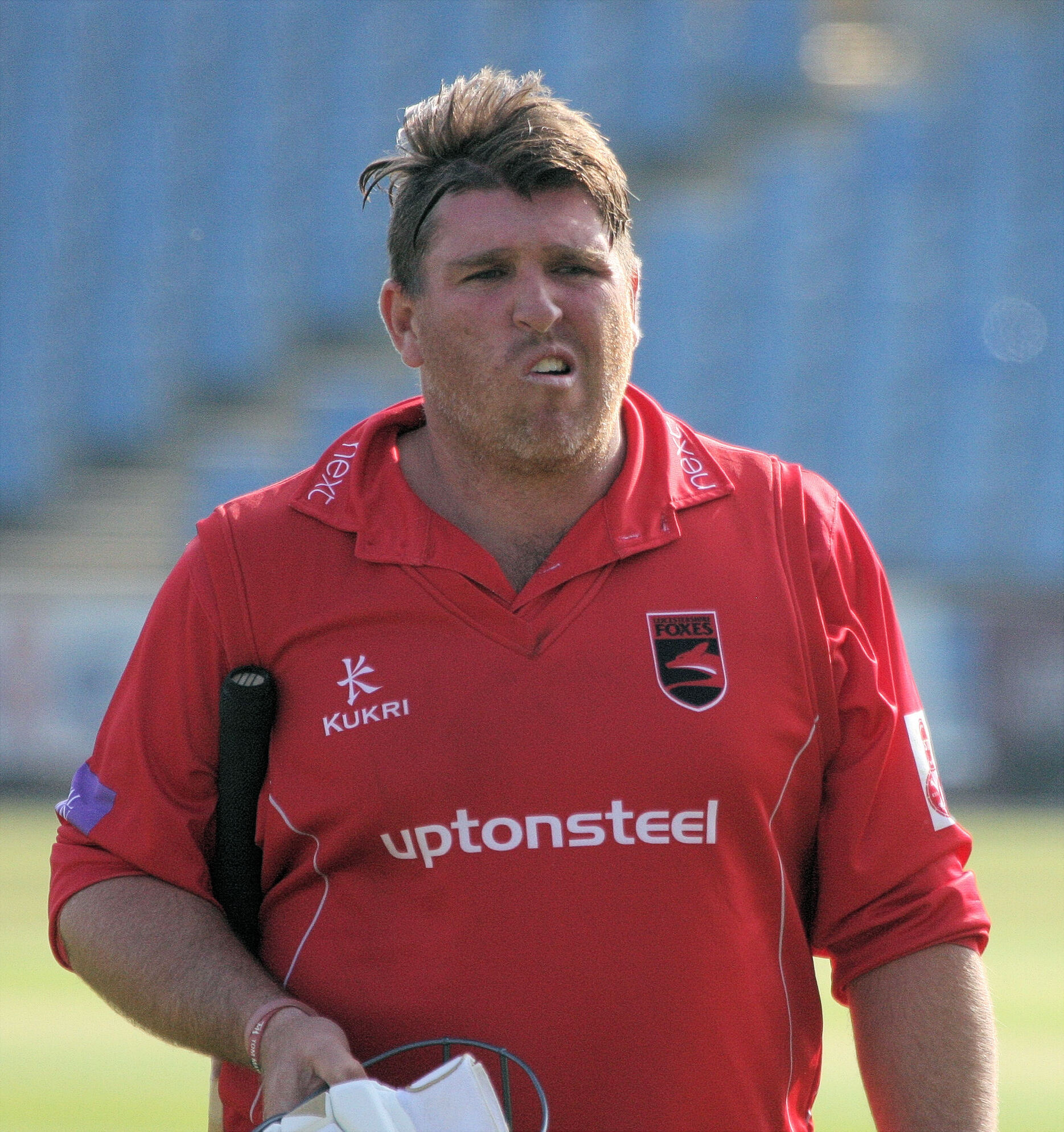
- Cosgrove in 2019

Personal information
- Full name: Mark James Cosgrove
- Born: 14 June 1984 (age 42); Adelaide, South Australia
- Nickname: Cozzie
- Height: 175 cm (5 ft 9 in)
- Batting: Left-handed
- Bowling: Right-arm medium
- Role: Batsman

International information
- National side: Australia (2006)
- ODI debut (cap 160): 28 April 2006 v Bangladesh
- Last ODI: 16 September 2006 v India

Domestic team information
- Years: Team
- 2002/03–2009/10: South Australia
- 2006: Glamorgan
- 2009–2011: Glamorgan
- 2010/11–2013/14: Tasmania
- 2011/12: Hobart Hurricanes
- 2012/13: Sydney Thunder
- 2013/14: Sydney Sixers
- 2014/15–2015/16: South Australia
- 2014/15: Sydney Thunder
- 2015–2019: Leicestershire

Career statistics
Competition	ODI	FC	LA	T20
Matches	3	221	160	139
Runs scored	112	14,976	4,821	3,112
Batting average	37.33	40.36	32.14	24.89
100s/50s	0/1	36/87	4/39	0/14
Top score	74	233	121	89
Balls bowled	30	4,307	1,067	197
Wickets	1	52	18	10
Bowling average	13.00	46.01	63.38	32.00
5 wickets in innings	0	0	0	0
10 wickets in match	0	0	0	0
Best bowling	1/1	3/3	2/21	2/11
Catches/stumpings	0/–	133/–	49/–	26/–
- Source: CricketArchive, 30 September 2019

Mark James Cosgrove (born 14 June 1984) is an Australian-English cricketer. He is a left-handed batsman and part-time medium pace bowler. He represented Australia in three One Day Internationals in 2006.

== Career ==
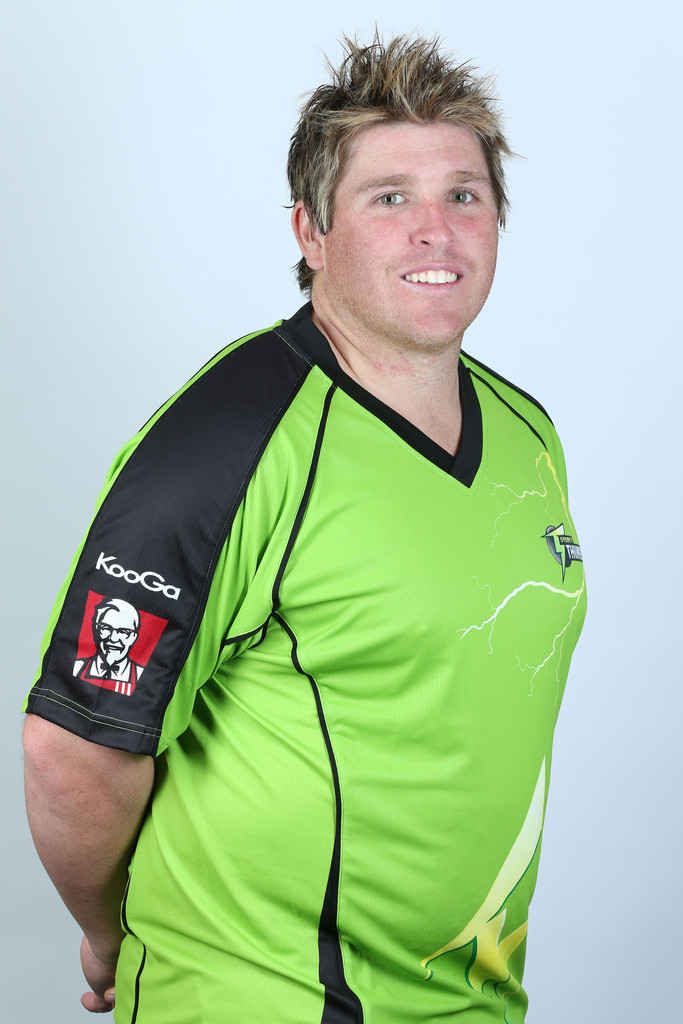
Mark Cosgrove with Sydney Thunder in 2012.

Cosgrove made his state debut in the 2002–03 season for South Australia. He was awarded the Bradman Young Cricketer of the Year at the Allan Border Medal ceremony by the CA in 2005. Earlier in the 2004–05 season he had been dropped from the state side for a time for being overweight.

On 28 April 2006, Cosgrove made his international debut in the third and final one day international of Australia's 2006 tour of Bangladesh. Played at the Fatullah Osmani Stadium, Fatullah, he bowled four overs for 12 runs and then opened the batting, scoring 74 before being bowled by Abdur Razzak as Australia successfully chased the Bangladesh target of 127. In September 2006, he played in Australia's first two one day internationals in the DLF Cup in Kuala Lumpur, scoring 34 batting at five in a win against the West Indies before being dismissed for four while batting at six in a game against India that was rained off in the second innings. In between the two international assignments he signed for Glamorgan to play as an overseas player for the 2006 season.

Cosgrove had a poor 2006–07 season with South Australia and was not selected for the 2007 World Cup, having previously been considered a possible dark horse selection. Later in 2007 he declined an offer to return to Glamorgan, instead joining the Centre of Excellence in Australia at the request of national chairman of selectors Andrew Hilditch. On 25 July 2007, Cosgrove was suspended from the Centre of Excellence for disciplinary reasons.

In April 2010, Cosgrove was not offered a new contract by South Australia. Jamie Cox, the state's director of cricket, said that "we were unable to help him fulfil his full potential." He had scored 511 first-class runs in 2009–10, including two hundreds, and also averaged more than 40 in the one-day competition while also playing as South Australia progressed to the Twenty20 domestic final. He returned to Glamorgan as their overseas player for the 2010 summer season.

Cosgrove joined Tasmania for the 2010–11 season and scored 806 Shield runs, the most in the competition. The following season was less successful, as he scored 347 Shield runs at 34.70 and made 203 runs at 22.25 in the Ryobi Cup. He only played one game in the inaugural Big Bash League for the Hobart Hurricanes.

In 2012-13 Cosgrove scored 784 runs at 39.20 in the Sheffield Shield, the second-highest total in the competition behind Tasmanian teammate Ricky Ponting. He was less successful in limited-overs cricket, scoring just 51 runs in 4 games in the Ryobi Cup and 61 runs in 5 Big Bash League games, where he played for Sydney Thunder.

In 2014, Cosgrove signed a two-year contract to return to South Australia after declining a two-year extension to his Tasmania contract. He cited a preference to return to South Australia to be closer to family. Cosgrove signed for Leicestershire in March 2015 on two-year contract, and was appointed captain. He used an English passport to play for the club so that he did not take up a place as an overseas player. As a consequence, for the 2015–16 season he took the position of South Australia's overseas player, replacing sacked captain Johan Botha in that position. He left South Australia at the end of that season, but remained with Leicestershire until his release at the end of the COVID-19-affected 2020 season, in which he did not play a game for the club.
