= Australian Cricket Awards =

Annual sports awards

The Australian Cricket Awards are a series of awards given to Australian cricketers by Cricket Australia and the Australian Cricketers' Association. It was originally known as the Allan Border Medal awards in 2000.

== Media ==
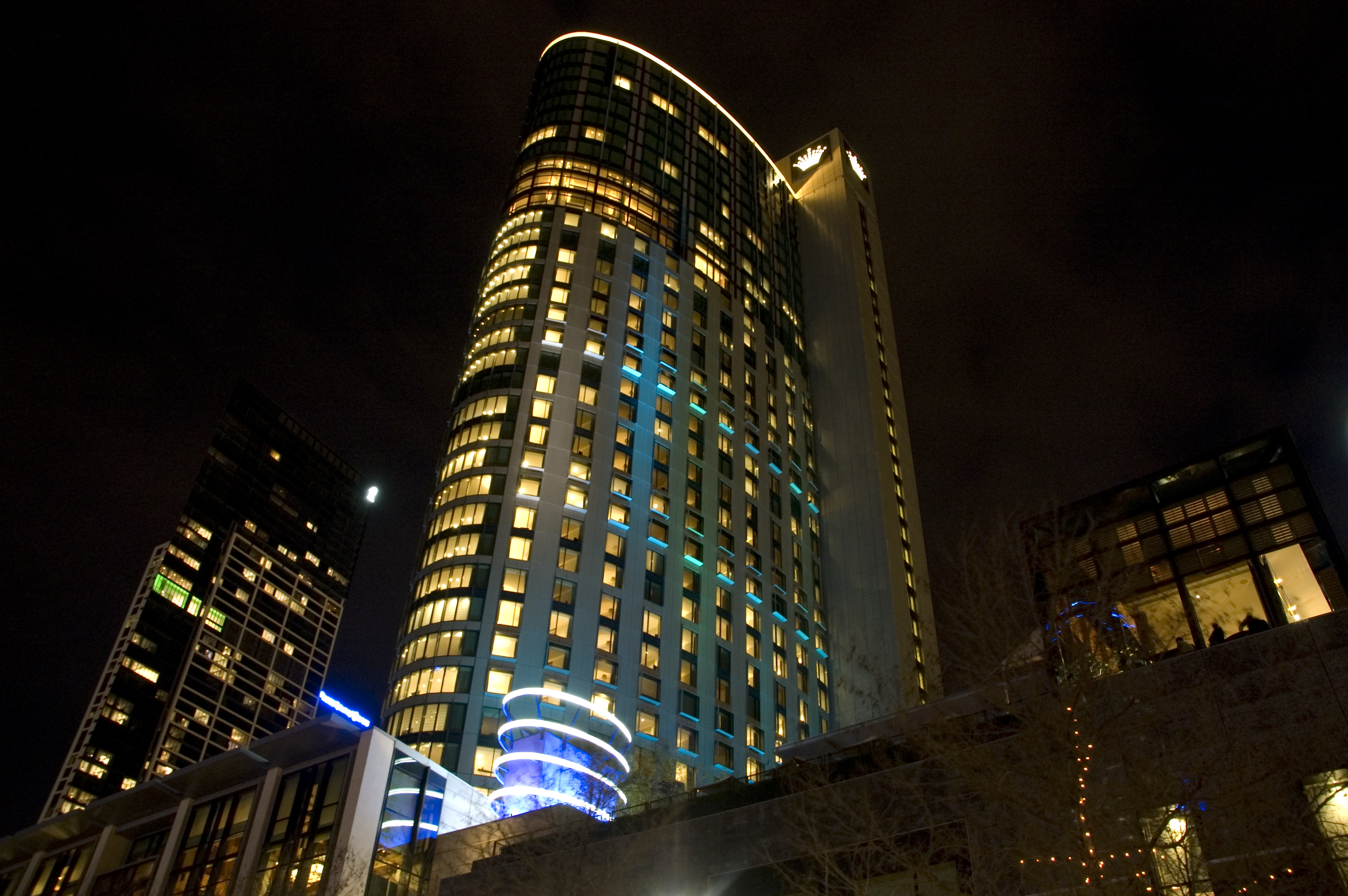
Crown Casino Melbourne, home of the Australian Cricket Awards ceremony

The award ceremony itself is a major publicity event and traditionally takes place at the Crown Casino in Melbourne, towards the end of January or the start of February each year. The 2014, 2015 and 2017 ceremonies however, were all held in Sydney. Due to the COVID-19 pandemic, the 2021 and 2022 ceremonies were unable to be held in person and the awards were instead announced as part of the pre-match show for the BBL Finals.

The award ceremony itself, prior to 2019 was broadcast live and screened on the digital channel Nine (2000 to 2010) and 9Gem (2011 to 2018). Since 2019, the event has been televised live on both Fox Cricket and 7mate channels. There was no physical award ceremony for 2026. New members of the Australian Cricket Hall of Fame are also inducted during the ceremony.

== Nomination process ==
Both the Allan Border Medal and the Belinda Clark award recipients are determined through a voting system where, after each international match, votes are cast after on a 3–2–1 basis by teammates, umpires, match referees and press. This voting system is weighted, with Test votes being three times more valuable than T20I votes, and two times more valuable than ODI votes. These votes are also used when determining the Test, ODI and T20I cricketers of the year for both men and women.

== Allan Border Medallists ==
The Allan Border Medal is considered to be the most prestigious individual prize in Australian men's cricket. First awarded in 2000, the medal is named after former Australian men's captain Allan Border and recognises the most outstanding male Australian cricketer of the past season.

Five cricketers have won the award more than once. Ricky Ponting and Michael Clarke won the award four times, sharing the award in 2009, as well as Steve Smith (4). The other multiple winners include David Warner who has won the award three times, as well as Shane Watson, Travis Head who has won the award twice. Watson also has the highest vote count of 296, with a huge margin of 100 votes in 2011.

- 2000: Glenn McGrath
- 2001: Colin Miller
- 2002: Matthew Hayden
- 2003: Adam Gilchrist
- 2004: Ricky Ponting
- 2005: Michael Clarke
- 2006: Ricky Ponting
- 2007: Ricky Ponting
- 2008: Brett Lee
- 2009^{1}: Ricky Ponting and Michael Clarke
- 2010: Shane Watson
- 2011: Shane Watson
- 2012: Michael Clarke
- 2013: Michael Clarke
- 2014: Mitchell Johnson
- 2015: Steve Smith
- 2016: David Warner
- 2017: David Warner
- 2018: Steve Smith
- 2019: Pat Cummins
- 2020: David Warner
- 2021: Steve Smith
- 2022: Mitchell Starc
- 2023: Steve Smith
- 2024: Mitchell Marsh
- 2025: Travis Head
- 2026: Travis Head

Ref:

^{1}No count-back is used in the Allan Border Medal.

=== Multiple winners ===
Wins	Player	Years
4	Ricky Ponting	2004, 2006, 2007, 2009
4	Michael Clarke	2005, 2009, 2012, 2013
4	Steve Smith	2015, 2018, 2021, 2023
3	David Warner	2016, 2017, 2020
2	Shane Watson	2010, 2011
2	Travis Head	2025, 2026

== Belinda Clark Award ==
The Belinda Clark Award recognises Australia's best women's international cricketer. Like the Allan Border Medal, it is presented annually and determined by matches played in the previous twelve-month period (for example: Ellyse Perry was the winner of the 2020 award, based on her performances predominantly taking place in 2019). The award is named after former national team captain Belinda Clark, whom the similarly titled Belinda Clark Medal—given to the New South Wales Breakers Player of the WNCL Season—also honours.

- 2002: Karen Rolton
- 2003: Karen Rolton
- 2004: Cathryn Fitzpatrick
- 2005: Karen Rolton
- 2006: Karen Rolton
- 2007: Lisa Sthalekar
- 2008: Lisa Sthalekar
- 2009: Shelley Nitschke
- 2010: Shelley Nitschke
- 2011: Shelley Nitschke
- 2012: Shelley Nitschke
- 2013: Jess Cameron
- 2014: Meg Lanning
- 2015: Meg Lanning
- 2016: Ellyse Perry
- 2017: Meg Lanning
- 2018: Ellyse Perry
- 2019: Alyssa Healy
- 2020: Ellyse Perry
- 2021: Beth Mooney
- 2022: Ashleigh Gardner
- 2023: Beth Mooney
- 2024: Ashleigh Gardner
- 2025: Annabel Sutherland
- 2026: Annabel Sutherland

Ref:

=== Multiple winners ===
Wins	Player	Years
4	Karen Rolton	2002, 2003, 2005, 2006
4	Shelley Nitschke	2009, 2010, 2011, 2012
3	Meg Lanning	2014, 2015, 2017
3	Ellyse Perry	2016, 2018, 2020
2	Lisa Sthalekar	2007, 2008
2	Beth Mooney	2021, 2023
2	Ashleigh Gardner	2022, 2024
2	Annabel Sutherland	2025, 2026

== Other awards ==
During the Australian Cricket Awards, other awards announced include:

- Shane Warne Men's Test Player of the Year,
- Men's One Day International Player of the Year,
- Women's One Day International Player of the Year,
- Men's Twenty20 International Player of the Year,
- Women's Twenty20 International Player of the Year,
- Bradman Young Cricketer of the Year,
- Betty Wilson Young Cricketer of the Year,
- Male Domestic Player of the Year,
- Female Domestic Player of the Year,
- Community Champion Award

Shane Watson won a total of 7 awards which is the most by any player. He is the only player to have won in all formats and all five major awards for male players. Three players won three major awards including the Allan Border Medal in the same year – Ricky Ponting in 2007, Shane Watson in 2011 and Steve Smith in 2015.

=== Shane Warne Men's Test Player of the Year ===
- 2000: Glenn McGrath
- 2001: Colin Miller
- 2002: Matthew Hayden
- 2003: Ricky Ponting
- 2004: Ricky Ponting
- 2005: Damien Martyn
- 2006: Shane Warne
- 2007: Ricky Ponting
- 2008: Brett Lee
- 2009: Michael Clarke
- 2010: Simon Katich
- 2011: Shane Watson
- 2012: Michael Clarke
- 2013: Michael Clarke
- 2014: Michael Clarke
- 2015: Steve Smith
- 2016: David Warner
- 2017: Mitchell Starc
- 2018: Steve Smith
- 2019: Nathan Lyon
- 2020: Marnus Labuschagne
- 2021: Pat Cummins
- 2022: Travis Head
- 2023: Usman Khawaja
- 2024: Nathan Lyon
- 2025: Josh Hazlewood
- 2026: Mitchell Starc

Ref:

==== Multiple winners ====
Wins	Player	Years
4	Michael Clarke	2009, 2012, 2013, 2014
3	Ricky Ponting	2003, 2004, 2007
2	Steve Smith	2015, 2018
2	Nathan Lyon	2019, 2024
2	Mitchell Starc	2017, 2026

=== Men's One Day International Player of the Year ===
- 2000: Shane Warne
- 2001: Glenn McGrath
- 2002: Ricky Ponting
- 2003: Adam Gilchrist
- 2004: Adam Gilchrist
- 2005: Andrew Symonds
- 2006^{1}: Michael Hussey
- 2007: Ricky Ponting
- 2008: Matthew Hayden
- 2009: Nathan Bracken
- 2010: Shane Watson
- 2011: Shane Watson
- 2012: Shane Watson
- 2013: Clint McKay
- 2014: George Bailey
- 2015: Steve Smith
- 2016: Glenn Maxwell
- 2017: David Warner
- 2018: David Warner
- 2019: Marcus Stoinis
- 2020: Aaron Finch
- 2021: Steve Smith
- 2022: Mitchell Starc
- 2023: David Warner
- 2024: Mitchell Marsh
- 2025: Travis Head
- 2026: Mitchell Marsh

Ref:

^{1}After counting in the 2006 One Day International Player of the Year award, Andrew Symonds, Michael Hussey, Brett Lee and Adam Gilchrist all drew on 22 votes. On a count-back, the winner would have been Andrew Symonds but he was ruled ineligible because he was suspended for 2 One Day Matches for an off-field indiscretion. On a second count-back Michael Hussey was declared the winner.

==== Multiple winners ====
Wins	Player	Years
3	Shane Watson	2010, 2011, 2012
3	David Warner	2017, 2018, 2023
2	Adam Gilchrist	2003, 2004
2	Ricky Ponting	2002, 2007
2	Steve Smith	2015, 2021
2	Mitchell Marsh	2024, 2026

=== Women's One Day International Player of the Year ===
- 2019: Alyssa Healy
- 2020: Alyssa Healy
- 2021: Rachael Haynes
- 2022: Alyssa Healy
- 2023: Beth Mooney
- 2024: Ellyse Perry
- 2025: Ashleigh Gardner
- 2026: Annabel Sutherland

Ref:

=== Men's Twenty20 International Player of the Year ===
- 2011: David Hussey
- 2012: Shane Watson
- 2013: Shane Watson
- 2014: Aaron Finch
- 2015: Glenn Maxwell
- 2016^{1}: Not awarded
- 2017: Shane Watson
- 2018: Aaron Finch
- 2019: Glenn Maxwell
- 2020: David Warner
- 2021: Ashton Agar
- 2022: Mitchell Marsh
- 2023: Marcus Stoinis
- 2024: Jason Behrendorff
- 2025: Adam Zampa
- 2026: Tim David

Ref:

^{1}Not awarded due to only 1 T20I played in 2015.

==== Multiple winners ====
Wins	Player	Years
3	Shane Watson	2012, 2013, 2017
2	Aaron Finch	2014, 2018
2	Glenn Maxwell	2015, 2019

=== Women's Twenty20 International Player of the Year ===
- 2019: Alyssa Healy
- 2020: Alyssa Healy
- 2021: Beth Mooney
- 2022: Beth Mooney
- 2023: Tahlia McGrath
- 2024: Ellyse Perry
- 2025: Beth Mooney
- 2026: Beth Mooney

Ref:

=== Bradman Young Cricketer of the Year ===
The Bradman Young Cricketer of the Year Award has been awarded continuously since 1990 and is The Bradman Foundation's principal award of recognition to elite cricketers. To be eligible for the award, the player must be a contracted first-class player, be under the age of 24, and have played not more than 10 first-class matches before 26 January.

- 2000: Brett Lee
- 2001: Nathan Bracken
- 2002: Shane Watson
- 2003: Nathan Hauritz
- 2004: Shaun Tait
- 2005: Mark Cosgrove
- 2006: Dan Cullen
- 2007: Ben Hilfenhaus
- 2008: Luke Pomersbach
- 2009: Phillip Hughes
- 2010: John Hastings
- 2011: Trent Copeland
- 2012: David Warner
- 2013: Joe Burns
- 2014: Jordan Silk
- 2015: Sean Abbott
- 2016: Alex Ross
- 2017: Hilton Cartwright
- 2018: Jhye Richardson
- 2019: Will Pucovski
- 2020: Wes Agar
- 2021: Will Sutherland
- 2022: Tim Ward
- 2023: Lance Morris
- 2024: Fergus O'Neill
- 2025: Sam Konstas
- 2026: Cooper Connolly

Ref:

=== Betty Wilson Young Cricketer of the Year ===
Named in honour of Betty Wilson, one of Australia's great all-rounders, it recognises a female cricketer who, prior to 5 December, was aged under 25 and had played 10 or fewer matches.

- 2017: Sophie Molineux
- 2018: Georgia Redmayne
- 2019: Georgia Wareham
- 2020: Tayla Vlaeminck
- 2021: Hannah Darlington
- 2022: Darcie Brown
- 2023: Courtney Sippel
- 2024: Emma de Broughe
- 2025: Chloe Ainsworth
- 2026: Caoimhe Bray

Ref:

=== Male Domestic Player of the Year ===
- 2000: Darren Lehmann (South Australia)
- 2001: Darren Lehmann (South Australia)
- 2002: Darren Lehmann (South Australia)
- 2003: Martin Love (Queensland)
- 2004: Simon Katich (New South Wales)
- 2005: Andy Bichel (Queensland)
- 2006: Phil Jaques (New South Wales)
- 2007: Chris Rogers (Western Australia)
- 2008: Ashley Noffke (Queensland)
- 2009: Michael Klinger (South Australia)
- 2010: Michael Klinger (South Australia)
- 2011: Usman Khawaja (New South Wales)
- 2012: Rob Quiney (Victoria)
- 2013: Phillip Hughes (New South Wales)
- 2014: Cameron White (Victoria)
- 2015: Jason Behrendorff (Western Australia)
- 2016: Adam Voges (Western Australia)
- 2017: Cameron White (Victoria)
- 2018: George Bailey (Tasmania)
- 2019: Matthew Wade (Tasmania)
- 2020: Shaun Marsh (Western Australia)
- 2021: Shaun Marsh (Western Australia)
- 2022: Travis Head (South Australia)
- 2023: Michael Neser (Queensland)
- 2024: Cameron Bancroft (Western Australia)
- 2025: Beau Webster (Tasmania)
- 2026: Jake Lehmann (South Australia)

Ref:

==== Multiple winners ====
Wins	Player	Years
3	Darren Lehmann	2000, 2001, 2002
2	Michael Klinger	2009, 2010
2	Cameron White	2014, 2017
2	Shaun Marsh	2020, 2021

=== Female Domestic Player of the Year ===
- 2017: Meg Lanning (Victoria / Melbourne Stars)
- 2018: Beth Mooney (Queensland / Brisbane Heat)
- 2019: Heather Graham (Western Australia / Perth Scorchers)
- 2020: Molly Strano (Victoria / Melbourne Renegades)
- 2021: Elyse Villani (Victoria / Melbourne Stars)
- 2022: Elyse Villani (Tasmania / Melbourne Stars)
- 2023: Annabel Sutherland (Victoria / Melbourne Stars)
- 2024: Elyse Villani (Tasmania / Hobart Hurricanes) and Sophie Day (Victoria / Melbourne Stars)
- 2025: Georgia Voll (Queensland / Sydney Thunder)
- 2026: Nicola Carey (Tasmania / Hobart Hurricanes)

Ref:
