= Michael Hussey =

Australian cricketer (born 1975)

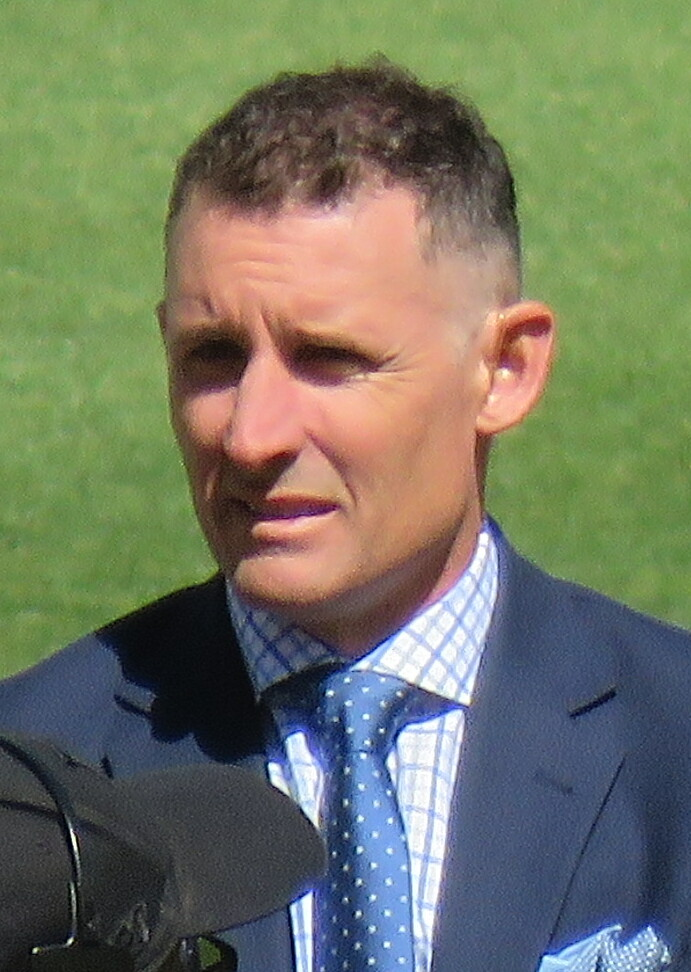
- Hussey in 2022

Personal information
- Born: 27 May 1975 (age 51); Mount Lawley, Western Australia, Australia
- Nickname: Mr. Cricket
- Batting: Left-handed
- Bowling: Right-arm medium
- Role: Middle-order batter
- Relatives: David Hussey (brother)

International information
- National side: Australia (2004–2013)
- Test debut (cap 393): 3 November 2005 v West Indies
- Last Test: 3 January 2013 v Sri Lanka
- ODI debut (cap 150): 1 February 2004 v India
- Last ODI: 3 September 2012 v Pakistan
- ODI shirt no.: 48
- T20I debut (cap 4): 17 February 2005 v New Zealand
- Last T20I: 5 October 2012 v West Indies

Domestic team information
- Years: Team
- 1994/95–2012/13: Western Australia
- 2001–2003: Northamptonshire (squad no. 3)
- 2004: Gloucestershire
- 2005: Durham
- 2008–2013, 2015: Chennai Super Kings (squad no. 48)
- 2011/12–2012/13: Perth Scorchers
- 2013/14–2015/16: Sydney Thunder
- 2014: Mumbai Indians (squad no. 48)
- 2015/16: Canterbury
- 2016: St Lucia Zouks

Career statistics
| Competition | Test | ODI | FC | LA |
|---|---|---|---|---|
| Matches | 79 | 185 | 273 | 381 |
| Runs scored | 6,235 | 5,442 | 22,783 | 12,123 |
| Batting average | 51.52 | 48.15 | 52.13 | 44.08 |
| 100s/50s | 19/29 | 3/39 | 61/103 | 12/90 |
| Top score | 195 | 109* | 331* | 123 |
| Balls bowled | 588 | 240 | 2,052 | 786 |
| Wickets | 7 | 2 | 27 | 20 |
| Bowling average | 43.71 | 117.50 | 40.48 | 41.45 |
| 5 wickets in innings | 0 | 0 | 0 | 0 |
| 10 wickets in match | 0 | 0 | 0 | 0 |
| Best bowling | 1/0 | 1/22 | 3/34 | 3/52 |
| Catches/stumpings | 85/– | 105/– | 307/– | 200/– |
Medal record
Men's cricket
Representing Australia
ICC Cricket World Cup
| Winner | 2007 West Indies |
T20 World Cup
| Runner-up | 2010 West Indies |
ICC Champions Trophy
| Winner | 2006 India |
| Winner | 2009 South Africa |
- Source: ESPNcricinfo, 22 December 2016

Michael Edward Killeen Hussey (born 27 May 1975) is an Australian cricket coach, commentator and former international cricketer, who played all forms of the game. Hussey is also widely known by his nickname 'Mr Cricket'. Hussey was a relative latecomer to both the Australian one-day international and Test teams, debuting at 28 and 30 years of age in the respective formats, with 15,313 first-class runs before making his Test debut. With his time representing Australia, Hussey won multiple ICC titles with the team: the 2007 Cricket World Cup, the 2006 ICC Champions Trophy, and the 2009 ICC Champions Trophy.

However, he had a highly prolific international career, being the top-ranked ODI batsman in the world in 2006. He played first-class cricket as vice-captain of the Western Warriors in Australia and played for three counties in England, as well as the Indian Premier League for the Chennai Super Kings. Michael Hussey announced his retirement from international cricket on 29 December 2012. He continued to play for Big Bash team Sydney Thunder, captaining them to their first and only BBL title, before announcing his retirement from all forms of cricket after the completion of its 2015–16 season.

== Early life ==
Hussey was born at Mount Lawley, a suburb of Perth. He attended Whitford Catholic Primary School in his early years and later Prendiville Catholic College in the northern suburbs of Perth. After finishing school he won a scholarship to the Australian Cricket Academy, where his contemporaries included Brett Lee and Jason Gillespie.

His father is a former athletics coach and his younger brother, David, was also a professional cricketer who played for Victoria and Australia. Prior to his entry into first-class cricket, Hussey studied to become a science teacher.

== Domestic career ==
Hussey initially played for his native Western Australian Warriors, and his career total of 6471 runs ranks eighth in the list of that state's run-makers in the Sheffield Shield. He then moved to England, where in July 2001 he scored an unbeaten 329 (a Northamptonshire club record) at Wantage Road in his team's 633 for six declared on the way to a 10-wicket victory. He later captained Northamptonshire. In August 2003 he surpassed his own Northamptonshire record, when he scored 331 not out against Somerset at Taunton.

When Hussey was playing for Australia A, the Australian reserve team, Allan Border once jokingly suggested he get match practice by staying in the nets for a full six hours; surprisingly, Hussey went on to do just that.

=== Indian Premier League ===
Hussey played for the Indian Premier League teams Chennai Super Kings and Mumbai Indians. He became the second batsman to score a century in the competition, after New Zealand's Brendon McCullum, making a score of 116 not out for Chennai against Kings XI Punjab in 2008.

Hussey won the tournament with Chennai in 2010. In 2011 he was the fifth-highest run-scorer in the competition, scoring 492 runs with a highest score of 81 not out, and in 2013 was the highest run-scorer with 733 runs, equalling the most runs by a batsman in an IPL season. He played for Mumbai in 2014 but returned to Chennai the following season.

In January 2018 he was appointed as Chennai's batting coach.

== International career ==
Hussey earned a Cricket Australia contract in 2004–05 after excelling in the ING Cup. Statistically, Hussey's international career was very successful, with his career batting average in Tests being 51.52 and in ODIs 48.15. He was a very occasional medium pace bowler, bowling only 98 overs in his Test career, 23 of them in 2008. He was brought into the attack usually to give the pace bowlers a rest, although he was once brought on in India to stop Ricky Ponting getting a one-match ban for a slow over rate. On 28 December 2008, Day 3 of the Boxing Day Test, he got his first Test wicket, Paul Harris caught by Mitchell Johnson. He ended with figures of 1/22. He took two wickets in One Day Internationals.

=== One-day internationals ===
Hussey's record as ODI captain
| Matches | Won | Lost | Drawn | Tied | No result | Win % |
| 4 | 0 | 4 | 0 | 0 | 0 | 0 |

Hussey debuted for the Australian One-day team against India on 1 February 2004 at his home WACA ground in Perth. In this match Hussey made 17 not out helping Australia win the match by five wickets.

In the third Super Series match on 9 October 2005, Hussey became the first person to hit the roof of the Telstra Dome (the ICC World XI's Makhaya Ntini was the bowler in this case). On 6 February 2006, he tied with Adam Gilchrist, Andrew Symonds and Brett Lee on 22 votes for the Australian One-Day Player of the Year at the annual Allan Border Medal presentation. However, Symonds was ruled ineligible after an alcohol-related indiscretion, and after Lee and Gilchrist were eliminated on countback, Hussey was named the outright winner. Hussey had also come second overall in the Allan Border medal his first year in international cricket. On 3 November 2006, Hussey became the ICC's ODI Player of the Year at the annual ICC Awards in Mumbai. He was also named in its World ODI XI in 2006 and as 12th man in 2007.

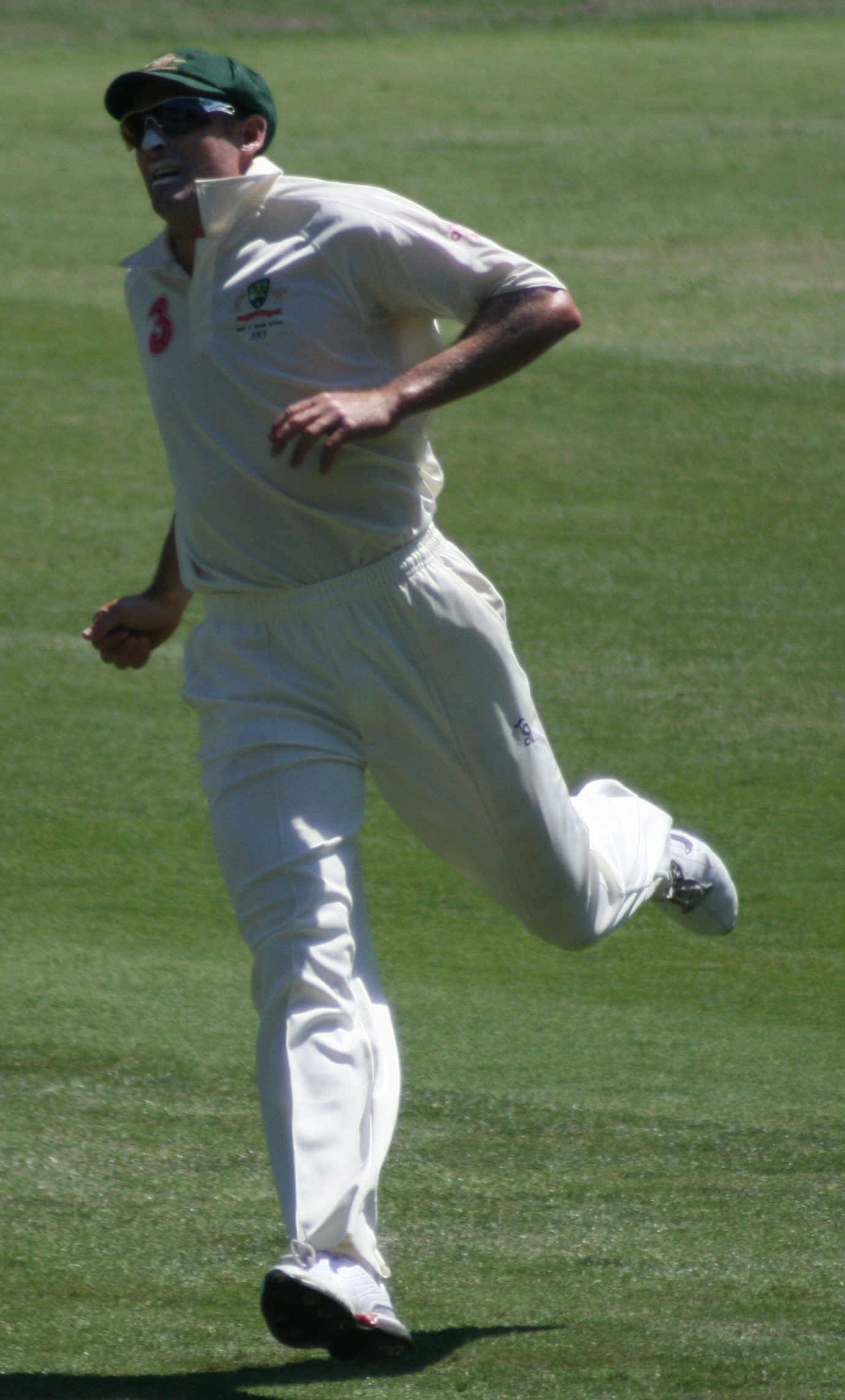
Hussey in the field in the Third Test against South Africa at the SCG in January 2009

On 18 September 2006, owing to Australia's rotation policy, and in Ricky Ponting's absence, Hussey captained Australia for the first time in the DLF Cup second round match against West Indies at Kuala Lumpur. Australia lost the game by three wickets, but Hussey and Brad Haddin put together a sixth-wicket partnership of 165, an ODI record for that wicket at the time.

In the 2007 Commonwealth Bank Triangular Series, Australia were in trouble while chasing a target against England, and in a later match New Zealand. Both times Hussey guided the Australians to victory, and on both occasions was the only recognised batsman at the crease at the end of the match.

Hussey led Australia in the Chappell–Hadlee Trophy after selectors rested captain Ricky Ponting and vice-captain Adam Gilchrist. The first match against New Zealand saw a 10-wicket loss, the first time Australia had lost by this margin in their One Day International history, although Hussey top scored with 42 off 96 balls. Hussey's record as captain was further marred when Australia lost the top place in the ODI rankings to South Africa for the first time since they were introduced in 2002 after losing to New Zealand two days later. Hussey top-scored for Australia with an aggressive 105 off 84 before another loss in the final match left him with a captaincy record of four losses from four matches.

In early 2007, Hussey had a major slump in form with an average of only eight in over 10 innings, which scarcely improved in the World Cup where he gained an average of 17.4 with 87 runs. However, this was also due to a lack of opportunities to bat because of Australia's top-order dominance.

In the fourth ODI in the Commonwealth Bank Series played at the MCG on 10 February 2008 against India, Australia's top order and middle order collapsed, which saw Hussey come in at 5/72 with the team in deep trouble. He made a 53-run partnership for the seventh wicket with Brett Lee (which was the highest partnership of the innings) until Lee fell to Pathan. Hussey batted through the rest of the innings, making an unbeaten 65 off 88 being the only Australian to really contribute to the poor total of 159.

In the first ODI of the 2008 Bangladesh ODI series, Hussey top-scored with 85 and received the man-of-the-match award. This coincided with his rise to second in the Reliance Mobile ICC ODI player rankings.

After initially being left out, Michael Hussey was named in the Australian 2011 World Cup squad as the replacement of Doug Bollinger after recovering from hamstring injury that needed surgery.

On 19 February 2012, Michael Hussey became the 13th batsman to score 5000 runs for Australia in ODI cricket, when he scored 59 runs against India at the Gabba.

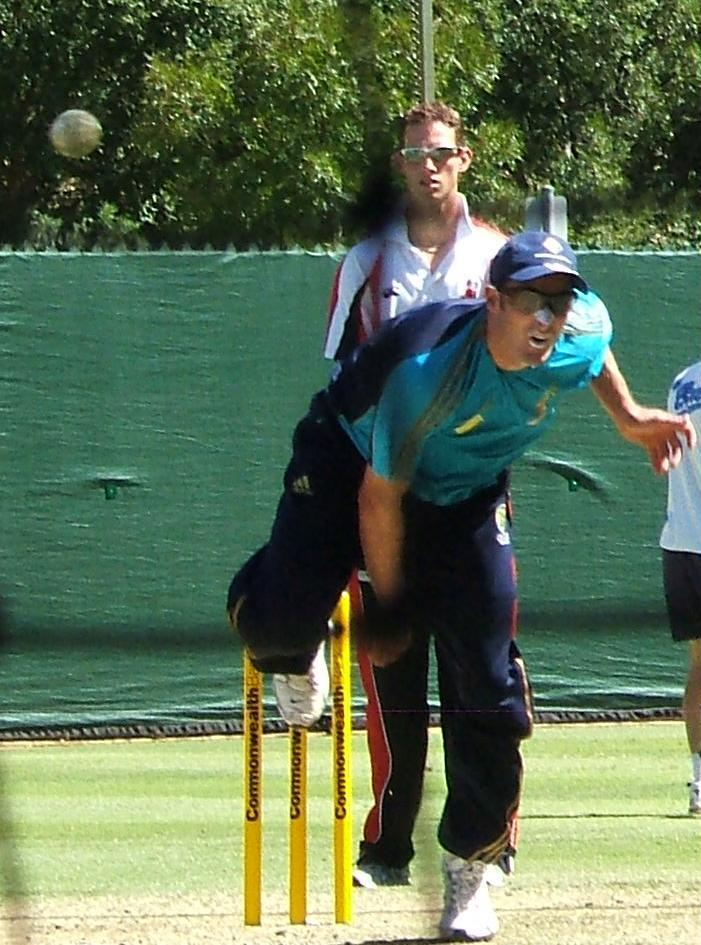
Hussey bowls in the Adelaide Oval nets, January 2009.

=== Tests ===
Hussey made his Test debut at the Gabba in Brisbane on 3 November 2005, as a replacement for fellow Western Australian batsman Justin Langer in the Australia vs. West Indies series. In the first innings Hussey managed only one run, caught by Denesh Ramdin off the bowling of Daren Powell. In the second innings Hussey turned in an unimpressive 29. In the following Test, at Bellerive Oval, he scored 137 and 31 not out and was named man of the match. In the third Test at Adelaide Oval, Hussey was moved down the order to number five to accommodate the return of Langer. He made 133 not out in the first innings and 30 not out in the second, bringing his Test average to 120.

On being moved down the order, Hussey proved invaluable to the Australian team, often building impressive partnerships with the tail-end batsmen, the most impressive being a 107-run 10th-wicket partnership with Glenn McGrath in the second Test of South Africa's 2005–06 tour of Australia, where Hussey would make 122. Hussey continued his remarkable batting with tail-enders against Bangladesh in their Spring 2006 2-Test series when he and Jason Gillespie (as a nightwatchman) put together a 320-run partnership, with Hussey making a then career-best 182.

On 18 April 2006 Hussey set a record as the fastest player in terms of time to reach 1,000 Test runs. He reached the milestone in just 166 days. Hussey was also the fastest player to reach the top 10 of the LG ICC cricket ratings.

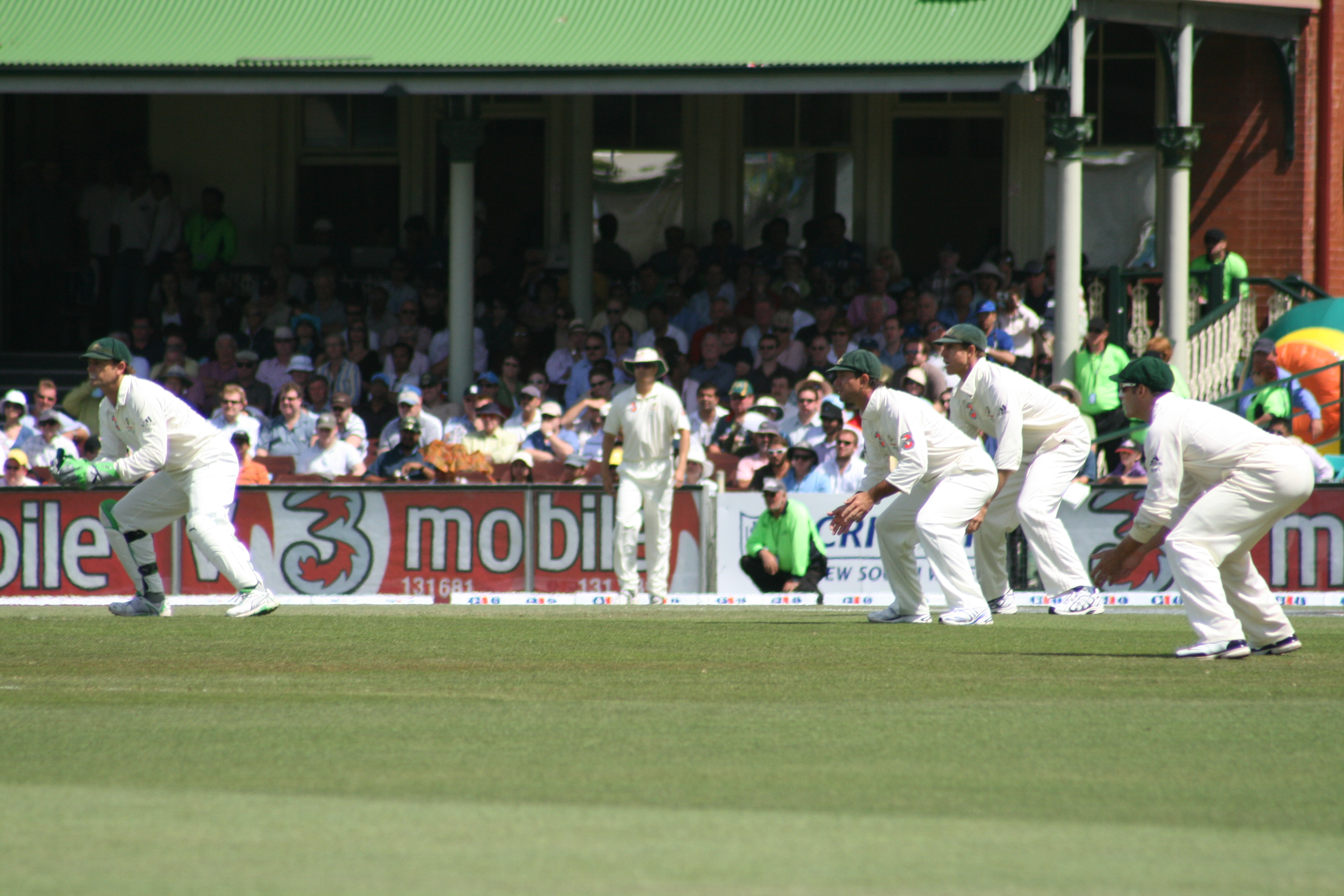
Hussey (far right) in the slips cordon against India in the 2nd Test at the SCG in 2008

In the second Test of the 2006–07 Ashes, known affectionately as "Amazing Adelaide" due to Australia's improbable victory, Hussey made 91 before he was bowled (playing on) by Matthew Hoggard. In the second innings Australia was chasing 168 off 35 overs for victory for a chance to go 2–0 up in the series. After the fall of two early wickets, Ponting and Hussey, who was promoted to No. 4 instead of Damien Martyn, formed a steady partnership to guide Australia to victory. Ponting fell on 49 but the battle was well over. Hussey scored the winning runs and made 61 not out from 66 balls. His partner, Michael Clarke, scored 21 not out.

On 16 December Hussey scored 103 runs off 156 balls—his fifth Test century—on the third day of the third match of the series at the WACA Ground in Perth, his home ground. He maintained an exceptional average of 105.25 in the 2006–07 Ashes series, which Australia won 5–0. On 6 January 2007 after Australia's 5–0 Ashes whitewash, Justin Langer anointed Hussey to be the next leader of the team's victory song Under the Southern Cross I Stand.

In the First Test against Sri Lanka at the Gabba, Hussey scored his sixth Test century with a score of 133 runs off 249 balls. He was also part of a record-breaking fourth-wicket partnership with Clarke. Their 245-run partnership is the third-highest partnership for Australia against Sri Lanka in Test matches. In the following match of the Warne-Muralidaran Trophy, Hussey scored his seventh Test century with a score of 132 and following it up in the second innings with 34 not out.

On 6 January 2008, in the Second Test of the Border-Gavaskar Trophy at the SCG, Hussey scored his eighth Test century, against India. This was the first time he scored more than 50 runs at that ground. He ended up not out on 145, before Ponting declared. This would be Australia's 16th successive Test victory, as the Australians won in controversial circumstances. However, in the first innings of the next Test he scored his first Test duck.

Hussey registered his ninth Test hundred in the First Test of the 2008 Border-Gavaskar Trophy at M. Chinnaswamy Stadium in Bangalore.

Hussey claimed his first Test wicket against South Africa on the third day of the 2008 Boxing Day Test at the MCG, when Paul Harris skied a ball over Mitchell Johnson's head and the latter ran back and took a running catch as the ball fell down past his shoulder.

Hussey played in all five Tests of the 2009 Ashes Series in England, scoring 276 runs in 8 innings with a series average of 34.5. He scored two half centuries, one at Lord's in the Second Test, which England won, and one in the Third Test at Edgbaston, which ended in a draw. He scored his tenth Test century in Australia's second innings in the Fifth and final Test at The Oval, where he scored 121, potentially saving his Test career after a long run without a century. He also took five catches through the series.

In the summer of 2009/10 Hussey scored his eleventh Test century. Australia were playing Pakistan and were losing badly when Hussey proved his abilities in batting with the tail end, scoring an unbeaten 134 at the SCG. This innings with Peter Siddle, who scored 38, potentially saved the match as Australia went from a terrible position to a reasonable one and ended up winning the match with Hussey named man of the match for his heroic effort.

In the first Test of the Frank Worrell Trophy against the West Indies in 2009 at the Gabba, Hussey took his second Test wicket after Dwayne Bravo hooked a short ball straight to deep backward square leg which was caught comfortably by Ben Hilfenhaus.

Prior to the 2010/11 Ashes series, Hussey was experiencing poor form in the lead-up to the series with speculation that he could be dropped. He retained his Test position after registering a second innings century against Victoria in the Sheffield Shield on 20 November, a few days prior to the First Ashes Test. In the First Test, Hussey scored a magnificent 195, his highest Test score, in a partnership of 307 with Brad Haddin, the highest partnership ever at the Gabba, later broken by Alastair Cook and Jonathan Trott in the next innings; the Test ended in a draw. In the Second Test, he scored 93 in the first innings following up with a 52 in the next. The next match, at the WACA Ground, he helped Australia to a 267 run win scoring 61 and 116.

In the 2011 Test tour of Sri Lanka, Hussey scored 95 & 15 in the First Test which earned him the Man of the Match honour. In the second Test he made 142 and took two wickets, including a vital one in Kumar Sangakkara, and took a spectacular one-handed full length diving catch in the gully and also being rewarded with the Man of the Match honour. In the third Test, he made 118 in the 1st innings.

In the first Test Match of 2012, Hussey scored an unbeaten 150 not out to help the Aussies to 659/4(dec). He was involved in a 344 run partnership with Michael Clarke, who managed to score an unbeaten 329 not out. He was praised for his efforts and he once again cemented himself in the team after being under some serious pressure from critics and selectors.

Hussey started the 2012/13 Australian summer well with a century against South Africa in the first Test at the Gabba. A partnership with Michael Clarke proved to be vital, as the pair put on more than 200 runs during the fourth and fifth days. This feat was repeated in the 2nd Test at the Adelaide Oval with another century (103), and a 272 run partnership with Clarke.

Hussey registered his 19th and final Test hundred in the First Test of the 2012-13 Warne-Muralidaran Trophy at the Bellerive Oval in Hobart, an elegant 115 runs. He played his final Test at the Sydney Cricket Ground, the last of Australia's three match series against Sri Lanka. In the first innings he was run out by Michael Clarke for 25, while in the second he guided Australia to victory with 27 not out.

=== Twenty20 Internationals ===
Hussey was part of Australia's 2007 ICC World Twenty20 squad which was knocked out in the semi-finals. He played in all of Australia's matches, scoring 65 runs with a best of 37 before injuring a hamstring, which prevented his participation in Australia's tour of India that followed.

In May 2010, he scored 60 runs off 24 balls in the semi-final of the ICC World Twenty20 to help defeat Pakistan and secure a place for Australia in the final. It is considered to be one of the most stunning run chases in Twenty20 cricket.

== Retirement ==
Hussey announced his retirement from international cricket after the 2012 Boxing Day Test in Melbourne. His last Test appearance was the New Year's fixture against Sri Lanka at the SCG in January 2013. He planned to play out the rest of the Australian summer in limited overs cricket but was surprisingly dropped with Australian selectors who were planning for the 2015 World Cup and gave Phillip Hughes and Usman Khawaja an opportunity at ODI level. Hussey explained that his motivation for his retirement was to spend more time with his family. He delayed his announcement until before the Sydney Test, fearing that he would be dropped before the Australian summer season was over.

== Career best performances ==
Hussey scored 19 Test centuries and three ODI centuries.

| | Batting | | | |
| | Score | Fixture | Venue | Season |
|---|---|---|---|---|
| Test | 195 | Australia v England | Gabba, Brisbane | 2010 |
| ODI | 109* | Australia v West Indies | Kinrara Academy Oval, Bandar Kinrara | 2006 |
| T20I | 60* | Australia v Pakistan | Beausejour Stadium, Gros Islet | 2010 |
| First-class | 331* | Somerset v Northamptonshire | County Ground, Taunton | 2003 |
| List A | 123 | Northamptonshire v Scotland | County Cricket Ground, Northampton | 2003 |
| Twenty20 | 116* | Kings XI Punjab v Chennai Super Kings | Punjab Cricket Association Stadium, Ajitgarh | 2008 |

=== International centuries ===
Hussey scored 22 centuries in international cricket, 19 in Test matches and three in ODIs.

His first Test century came in his second match scoring 137 against the West Indies at the Bellerive Oval in 2005. His highest Test score of 195 came against England at The Gabba in Brisbane during the 2010–11 Ashes series.

Test centuries scored by Michael Hussey
| No. | Date | Score | Opponent | Venue | Result | Ref |
|---|---|---|---|---|---|---|
| 1 | 17 November 2005 | 137 | West Indies | Bellerive Oval, Hobart, Australia | Australia won | |
| 2 | 25 November 2005 | 133* | West Indies | Adelaide Oval, Adelaide, Australia | Australia won | |
| 3 | 26 December 2005 | 122 | South Africa | Melbourne Cricket Ground, Melbourne, Australia | Australia won | |
| 4 | 26 April 2006 | 182 | Bangladesh | Zohur Ahmed Chowdhury Stadium, Chattogram, Bangladesh | Australia won | |
| 5 | 14 December 2006 | 103 | England | WACA Ground, Perth, Australia | Australia won | |
| 6 | 8 November 2007 | 133 | Sri Lanka | The Gabba, Brisbane, Australia | Australia won | |
| 7 | 16 November 2007 | 132 | Sri Lanka | Bellerive Oval, Hobart, Australia | Australia won | |
| 8 | 2 January 2008 | 145* | India | Sydney Cricket Ground, Sydney, Australia | Australia won | |
| 9 | 9 October 2008 | 146 | India | M. Chinnaswamy Stadium, Bangalore, India | Drawn | |
| 10 | 20 August 2009 | 121 | England | The Oval, London, England | Australia lost | |
| 11 | 3 January 2010 | 134* | Pakistan | Sydney Cricket Ground, Sydney, Australia | Australia won | |
| 12 | 25 November 2010 | 195 | England | The Gabba, Brisbane, Australia | Drawn | |
| 13 | 16 December 2010 | 116 | England | WACA Ground, Perth, Australia | Australia won | |
| 14 | 8 September 2011 | 142 | Sri Lanka | Pallekele International Cricket Stadium, Kandy, Sri Lanka | Drawn | |
| 15 | 16 September 2011 | 118 | Sri Lanka | Singhalese Sports Club Cricket Ground, Colombo, Sri Lanka | Drawn | |
| 16 | 3 January 2012 | 150* | India | Sydney Cricket Ground, Sydney, Australia | Australia won | |
| 17 | 9 November 2012 | 100 | South Africa | The Gabba, Brisbane, Australia | Drawn | |
| 18 | 22 November 2012 | 103 | South Africa | Adelaide Oval, Adelaide, Australia | Drawn | |
| 19 | 14 December 2012 | 115* | Sri Lanka | Bellerive Oval, Hobart, Australia | Australia won | |

ODI centuries scored by Michael Hussey
| No. | Date | Score | Opponent | Venue | Result | Ref |
|---|---|---|---|---|---|---|
| 1 | 18 September 2006 | 109* | West Indies | Kinrara Academy Oval, Kuala Lumpur, Malaysia | Australia lost | |
| 2 | 18 February 2007 | 105 | New Zealand | Eden Park, Auckland, New Zealand | Australia lost | |
| 3 | 13 April 2011 | 108 | Bangladesh | Sher-e-Bangla National Cricket Stadium, Dhaka, Bangladesh | Australia won | |

== Personal life ==
Hussey is married and has four children. Hussey has the nickname Mr Cricket, due to his encyclopaedic knowledge of his sport. He has repeatedly stated that he dislikes the nickname finding it "a bit embarrassing".

Hussey's autobiography Underneath the Southern Cross was published on 1 October 2013 by Hardie Grant Books.

Underneath the Southern Cross
- Author: Michael Hussey
- Language: English
- Subject: Autobiography
- Genre: Autobiography
- Publisher: Hardie Grant Books
- Publication date: 1 October 2013
- Publication place: Australia
- Media type: Print (Hardcover & Paperback), E-book
- Pages: 400
- ISBN: 978-1742706573

== Post-retirement ==
After retiring from all levels of cricket Hussey worked as a batting consultant for Australia for the 2016 ICC World Twenty20. He was also a cricket commentator in the Indian Premier League (IPL) for the 2016 season. Hussey joined the Fox Sports commentary team from the 2018-19 cricket season.

Several years after his retirement from the Big Bash League, Hussey was appointed the role of Director of Cricket for the Sydney Thunder. He was also appointed as the Batting Coach of Chennai Super Kings (CSK) for 2018 Season of Indian Premier League (IPL)

Away from cricket, Hussey showed his support for Cancer Council WA by being their 2016 Ambassador.

He served as batting coach in the Senior Men's England Cricket team, and currently is the coach of the Welsh Fire Men's team replacing World Cup winning coach Gary Kirsten in the 2023 season.

Hussey was inducted to the Australian Cricket Hall of Fame during the 2023 Boxing Day Test.

== See also ==
- Under the Southern Cross I Stand
