= Michael Clarke (cricketer) =

Australian cricketer

Michael Clarke AO
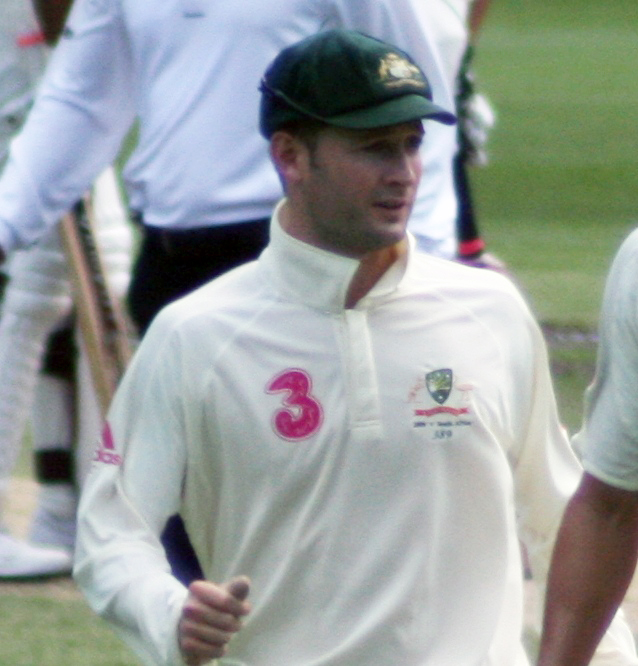
- Clarke in 2009

Personal information
- Full name: Michael John Clarke
- Born: 2 April 1981 (age 45); Liverpool, New South Wales, Australia
- Nickname: Pup
- Height: 178 cm (5 ft 10 in)
- Batting: Right-handed
- Bowling: Slow left-arm orthodox
- Role: Middle-order batter

International information
- National side: Australia (2003–2015)
- Test debut (cap 389): 6 October 2004 v India
- Last Test: 20 August 2015 v England
- ODI debut (cap 149): 19 January 2003 v England
- Last ODI: 29 March 2015 v New Zealand
- ODI shirt no.: 23 (previously 49)
- T20I debut (cap 1): 17 February 2005 v New Zealand
- Last T20I: 31 October 2010 v Sri Lanka
- T20I shirt no.: 23

Domestic team information
- Years: Team
- 1999/00–2013/14: New South Wales
- 2004: Hampshire
- 2012: Pune Warriors India

Career statistics
Competition	Test	ODI	FC	LA
Matches	115	245	188	313
Runs scored	8,643	7,981	13,826	9,905
Batting average	49.10	44.58	47.02	42.51
100s/50s	28/27	8/58	45/48	9/73
Top score	329*	130	329*	130
Balls bowled	2,435	2,585	3,627	3,295
Wickets	31	57	42	84
Bowling average	38.19	37.64	44.90	32.01
5 wickets in innings	2	1	2	1
10 wickets in match	0	0	0	0
Best bowling	6/9	5/35	6/9	5/35
Catches/stumpings	134/–	106/–	203/–	132/–
Medal record
Men's cricket
Representing Australia
ICC Cricket World Cup
Winner	2007 West Indies
Winner	2015 Australia and New Zealand
ICC T20 World Cup
Runner-up	2010 West Indies
ICC Champions Trophy
Winner	2006 India
- Source: ESPNcricinfo, 2 April 2019

Michael John Clarke AO (born 2 April 1981) is an Australian former cricketer. He was captain of the Australian cricket team in both Test and One Day International (ODI) between 2011 and 2015, leading Australia to victory in the 2015 Cricket World Cup. He also served as captain of the Twenty20 International (T20I) team between 2007 and 2010. With his time representing Australia, Clarke won multiple ICC titles with the team: the 2007 Cricket World Cup, the 2015 Cricket World Cup which he was the winning captain, and the 2006 ICC Champions Trophy.

Nicknamed "Pup", Clarke was a right-handed middle-order batsman, an occasional left-arm orthodox spin bowler and also a slip catcher. He represented New South Wales at a domestic level.

Clarke retired from all forms of cricket after the final Test of the 2015 Ashes series.

== Early life and career ==
Clarke was born and raised in Liverpool, New South Wales. He attended Marsden Road Public School and cultivated his batting skills at his father's indoor cricket centre in Liverpool after school. Despite being a left handed person who writes and bowls with his left hand, Clarke trained to bat right handed . His junior club was the Western Suburbs District Cricket Club.

When Clarke was 17, scans revealed that he had three degenerative discs in his lower back, a condition that would restrict his back movement through his career. Clarke underwent core strengthening exercises to ease this condition.

Clarke made his first-class debut for New South Wales as a seventeen-year-old in a game against the touring Indian team at the Sydney Cricket Ground in December 1999. He was an AIS Australian Cricket Academy scholarship holder in 1999–2000. In 2002, Clarke played for Ramsbottom Cricket Club in English club cricket. He became the first player to hit a double century in the history of the Lancashire League.

== International career ==
=== Early years ===
Clarke made his One Day International debut in January 2003 against England at Adelaide Oval.

Clarke made his Test debut at M. Chinnaswamy Stadium in Bangalore in October 2004, in the first Test match of Australia's 2004 tour of India. In his first innings, Clarke batted with good footwork against India's bowlers. He was not confident that he could read India's spin bowler Anil Kumble's deliveries, so he moved to the pitch of the ball to eliminate the spin. He scored 151 runs and was named the player of the match in Australia's win. He continued to play well for the rest of the tour. Despite not being considered a strong bowler, he bowled in fourth Test match at Wankhede Stadium in Mumbai and took six wickets for nine runs. This remained the best bowling performance of his Test career until he retired.

The Australian team returned home in November 2004 and Clarke played his first home Test match against New Zealand at The Gabba in Brisbane. He scored another century, finishing with 141 runs, and was again named player of the match. After his early success in the team, Clarke began to struggle and didn't score another century in the following six Test series he played. His struggles began in the 2005 Ashes series in England. He played a strong innings in the 1st Test match at Lord's in July 2005, reaching 91 quickly. England responded with defensive bowling tactics to slow him down, and Clarke tried to improvise with aggressive shots and was dismissed. Clarke's form dropped after this innings, and he struggled to score runs for the rest of the year. He stayed in the team until November 2005, during Australia's series against the West Indies. In the first Test match at Bellerive Oval in Hobart, Clarke was dismissed for 5 runs while playing a loose stroke in the first innings, and he did not bat in the second innings. He was dropped from the team following this match.

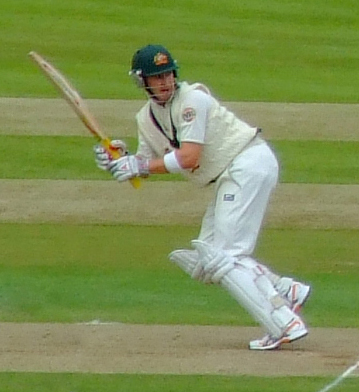
Clarke batting for Australia in 2009

=== Return to international cricket ===
After being dropped from the national team at the end of 2005, Clarke focused on changing his batting technique to tighten his defence and play with a straighter bat. He performed well in Australian domestic cricket and returned to the national team in 2006. His initial return came in Australia's first ever tour of Bangladesh in April 2006, but after this tour he was dropped again. He next returned to the team for the 2006–07 Ashes series when Shane Watson was injured and unable to play. He scored centuries in back-to-back matches in the second and third Tests at Adelaide Oval and the WACA which would cement his place in the team.

Clarke then helped Australia retain the 2007 Cricket World Cup in the West Indies where they did not lose a game. After Damien Martyn's retirement he was elevated to number five in the batting line up. He had a superb tournament making four 50s including a 92 and a 93* against the Netherlands and South Africa. He also made an unbeaten 60 against South Africa in the semi-final to guide Australia into the final at Barbados, against Sri Lanka. He was named as 12th man in the 'Team of the Tournament' by ESPNcricinfo for the 2007 World Cup.

Clarke's results in international matches
	Matches	Won	Lost	Drawn	Tied	No result
Test	115	64	32	19	0	-
ODI	245	167	64	-	1	13
T20I	34	18	14	–	1	1
Last Updated:		23 August 2015				

=== Struggle in form ===
Clarke faced only four balls for three runs in the ICC World Twenty20, when Australia were knocked out by India in the semi-final. Two weeks later he made 130 against India in the first of a seven-match ODI series. He did not maintain that form in the remaining 6 matches mustering up just one fifty. He opened the batting in the final two games after a hip injury ruled out Matthew Hayden and he made two golden ducks. In the tour-ending Twenty20 match Clarke dropped back down the order with the return of Hayden, and scored 25 not out in a heavy defeat.

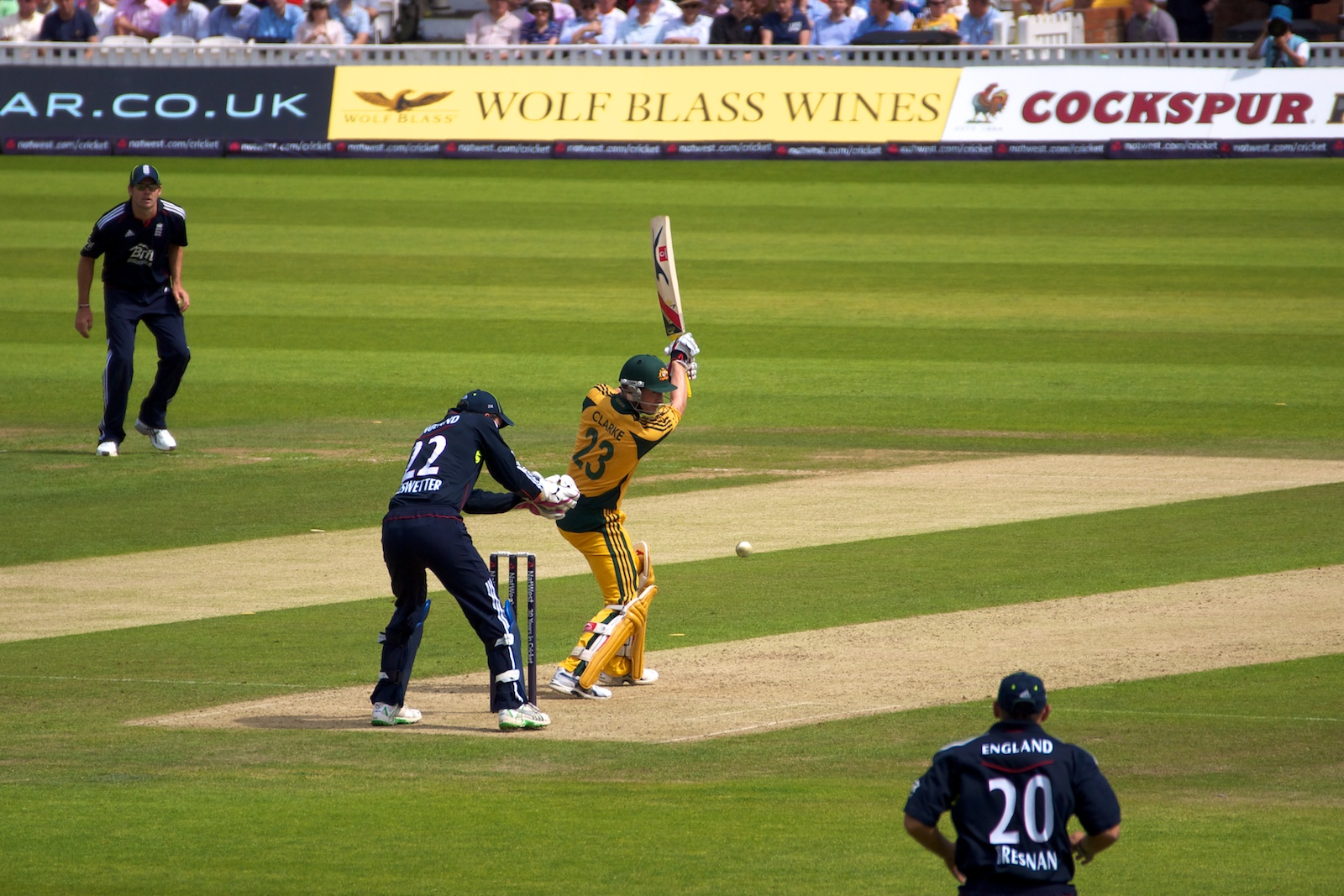
Michael Clarke on his way to 99* against England at the Oval in 2010

On 9 November 2007, Clarke notched up his fifth Test century against Sri Lanka in a two Test series. Clarke shared a 245 run partnership with Mike Hussey at the Gabba in Brisbane, Hussey departed on 133 but Clarke went on and had a partnership with Symonds who made 53*, the pair were unbeaten when Ricky Ponting declared the innings, Clarke top scoring with 145 not out.

On 6 January 2008, Clarke dismissed Harbhajan Singh, RP Singh and Ishant Sharma in the second last over of the day, with just six minutes remaining, to claim the final three wickets and win the Test match for Australia (at one stage he was on a hat trick, dismissing Harbhajan Singh and RP Singh on consecutive deliveries). His innings figures were 3 for 5 in 1.5 overs. Australian captain Ricky Ponting had declared that morning, setting India a total of 333 to chase and allowing Australia arguably too little time to bowl out the visitors. Clarke's wickets ensured that Australia retained the Border–Gavaskar Trophy in 2008 and kept their world record equalling 16 match win streak alive.

=== Vice captaincy ===
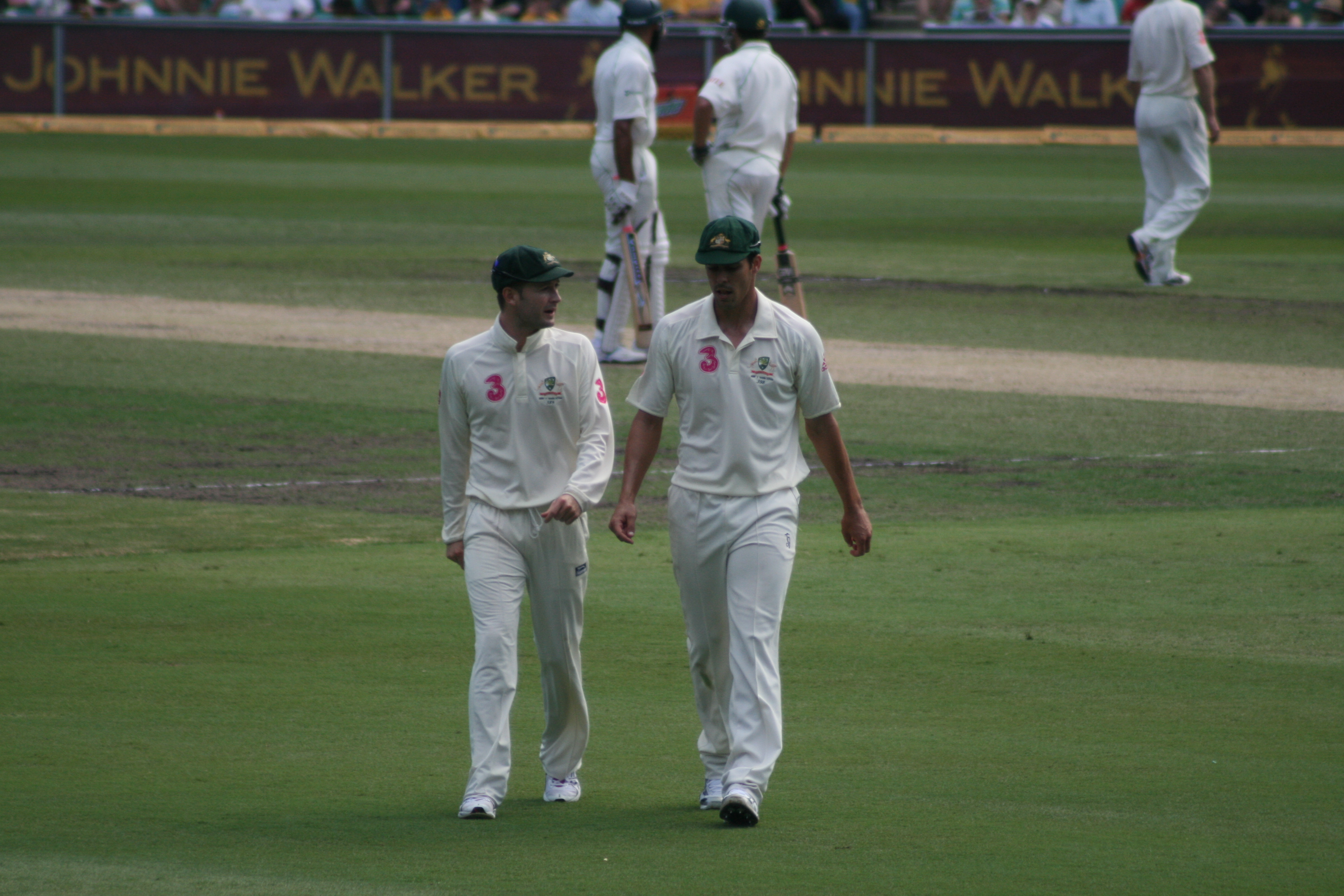
Clarke with Mitchell Johnson in 2009.

After the retirement of Adam Gilchrist, in April 2008 Clarke was named vice-captain of the Australian team. Clarke missed the start of Australia's 2008 tour of the West Indies following the death of Bingle's father, meaning Hussey took over as vice-captain for the start of the tour. Soon after Clarke joined up with the squad, he scored a century in the second Test in Antigua, going on to captain the team in the final two One Day Internationals, both of which were won, in the absence through injury of Ponting.

He was named man of the series in the two-Test series against New Zealand in Australia with scores of 110, 98 and 10, as well as being the top run-scorer in the three-Test series against South Africa in Australia. Clarke won the 2009 Allan Border Medal in a tie with Ricky Ponting both scoring 41 points, and was named Test Cricketer of the Year. For his performances in 2009, he was named in the World Test XI by the ICC.

=== Captaincy ===
On 5 December 2007, Cricket Australia named Clarke as captain of Australia for their one-off Twenty20 game against New Zealand in Perth, after deciding to rest Ponting and Hayden.

Michael Clarke's record as captain
	Matches	Won	Lost	Drawn	Tied	No result	Win %
Test	47	24	16	7	0	–	51.06%
ODI	74	50	21	–	–	3	67.57%
T20I	18	12	4	–	1	1	66.67%

Clarke was named as captain of Australia's Twenty20 team in October 2009, taking over from Ricky Ponting, who retired from Twenty20 International cricket to prolong his career. In January 2011, Clarke was named as stand-in captain for the fifth Test of the 2010–11 Ashes Series at the SCG, replacing the injured Ricky Ponting. He announced his retirement from Twenty20 International cricket on 7 January 2011, to concentrate on the longer forms of the game. When Ponting stood down from the captaincy of the Australian Test and ODI teams after the 2011 World Cup, Clarke was appointed as his permanent replacement in both roles.

His knock of 151 against South Africa at Cape Town was nominated to be one of the best Test batting performance of the year 2011 by ESPNcricinfo.

In January 2012, in the second Test of Australia's home series against India and after a string of Test centuries since becoming captain, Clarke became the first Australian batsman since Matthew Hayden in 2003 to score a triple hundred. He joined with Ricky Ponting (134) in a partnership of 288, then added 334 with Michael Hussey (150*) before declaring on 329*, having started his innings with the score at 37/3. This match against India was the 100th Test to be played at the Sydney Cricket Ground, and Clarke's score was both the highest ever made in an Australia-India Test (surpassing V. V. S. Laxman's 281 from the 2000/01 season) and the highest ever achieved at the ground. The ground high score record had been held for more than a century by Englishman Reg "Tip" Foster's 287 scored in the 1903/04 season. Clarke led Australia to a 4–0 win and was named the player of the series, having scored 626 runs at an average of 125.20. His knock was nominated to be one of the best Test batting performance of the year by ESPNcricinfo. He joined his triple century in Sydney with a double-century (210) in the first innings of the fourth Test in Adelaide. His 386-run partnership with Ponting (who scored 221) was the fourth-highest in Australian Test history. Following the Frank Worrell Trophy 2012, Ian Chappell said Clarke "is quickly establishing a well-deserved reputation for brave and aggressive captaincy. His entertaining approach is based on one premise: trying to win the match from the opening delivery. This should be the aim of all international captains, but sadly it isn't."

On 22 November 2012, Clarke scored a double century against South Africa at the Adelaide Oval.

Three weeks before the 2013 Ashes series, Clarke requested to stand down from his role as a selector, which also coincided with the sacking of coach Mickey Arthur and the naming of Darren Lehmann as his successor. After losing the 2013 Ashes in England, Clarke led Australia to a 5–0 victory in the 2013–14 Ashes series. Australia later gained the No. 1 Test ranking from South Africa after a long span of 4 years and 9 months (from August 2009 to April 2014), when Australia defeated South Africa 2–1 in a 3 match Test series, during Australia's tour of South Africa in 2014.

Under his captaincy, Australia made their lowest Test score (47 all out) in 109 years, and shortest first innings (18.3 overs, 60 all out) in Test cricket history, and their worst-ever series defeat against India in Test history, which is also the first 4–0 whitewash for Australia against any team since 1969. Several of his teammates have criticised his captaincy. Mitchell Johnson described the team atmosphere as 'toxic' under his captaincy, while Michael Hussey described the dressing room was stressful and tense. Several former players including John Buchanan Andrew Symonds, Matthew Hayden, and Simon Katich spoke against his captaincy. Katich, a former team mainstay, blamed Clarke for effectively ending his career once he became captain in revenge for a post-match incident several years earlier which saw Katich grab Clarke by the throat following a row about the singing of Australia's team song in the dressing room.

=== Late career ===
Clarke suffered a hamstring injury on 14 November 2014, which put him in doubt to play at the beginning of the 2014–15 Border–Gavaskar Trophy. The series was rescheduled after the death of Phillip Hughes on 27 November, and Clarke was able to recover in time for the first Test at Adelaide Oval, for which Hughes was named as Australia's honorary 13th man. On the first day of the match, Clarke scored 60 runs before suffering a back injury (a flare-up of his degenerative back condition). He retired hurt from the innings, but returned to batting the next day. Because of his injury, Clarke couldn't play in his usual style and focused on wrist-work. He scored a century, finishing his innings with 128 runs. This was the last century he scored in his career.

Clarke captained the Australian team for 2015 Cricket World Cup. Clarke starred in the final against New Zealand, top scoring with a score of 74 off 72 balls, as Australia won their fifth World Cup title. He was bowled when nine runs were required to win.

Clarke announced that he would retire from One Day Cricket at the conclusion of the 2015 Cricket World Cup. Clarke played 244 ODIs, made 7907 runs at an average of 44.42 with 8 centuries and 58 half-centuries. He led his country in 73 matches, of which Australia won 49.

Clarke captained Australia for the last time in the 2015 Ashes series. Clarke batted poorly during the series, failing to score above 50 in any innings. Australia lost the series after the fourth Test match at Trent Bridge with one match remaining. Following the match, Clarke announced that he would retire from international cricket at the end of the series.

== Twenty20 leagues ==
On 1 May 2012, Clarke made his debut in the Indian Premier League for Pune Warriors India.

In 2013, Clarke was named captain of the Sydney Thunder in Australia's Twenty20 Big Bash League; however, due to injury and international team commitments, he never actually played a game for the Thunder.

He also signed with the Melbourne Stars ahead of BBL|05, being announced in April as captain and wearing Shane Warne's iconic number 23 in a two-season deal. However, he backed out of that deal in September of that year, taking an "extended break from cricket" after retiring from the international game, before announcing his retirement from all formats due to injury not long after.

== Statistics and achievements ==
=== Honours ===
Clarke won the Allan Border Medal, considered to be the most prestigious individual prize in Australian cricket, four times, in 2005, 2009 (jointly with Ricky Ponting), 2012 and 2013. Only Ponting had won it as many times. He was also awarded the Men's Test Player of the Year at the Allan Border Medal ceremony by the CA in 2009, 2012, 2013 and 2014.

He won the Sir Garfield Sobers Trophy, thereby winning the Cricketer of the Year 2013 and also the Test Cricketer of the Year 2013. He was named as a Wisden Cricketer of the Year in 2010 Wisden Cricketers' Almanack. He was named Wisden Leading Cricketer in the World for the year 2012 in 2013 Wisden Cricketers' Almanack. For his performances in 2012, he was named as captain of the World Test XI and ODI XI by the ICC. He was also named in the World Test XI by the ICC in 2013. He was also named in the Test XI of the year by ESPNcricinfo for 2012 and 2013.

In June 2020, Clarke was made an Officer of the Order of Australia in the Queen's Birthday Honours, "for distinguished service to cricket as a player at the national and international level, through leadership roles, and to the community." Three months later, he was inducted as a Cricket NSW Life Member.

=== Career highlights ===
==== Tests ====
- Clarke's debut Test score of 151 was made against India in Bangalore, 2004–05;
- He made 141 against New Zealand in November 2004 on his debut on home-soil at the Gabba (Brisbane, Australia), making him the only Australian to score a century on both home and away debuts.
- His best Test bowling figures of 6 for 9 (6.2 overs) came against India, Mumbai, 2004–05.
- His first Ashes century came in December 2006, when he hit 124 at the Adelaide Oval to help Australia to victory.
- He dismissed India's last three batsman in five balls on the fifth day of the 2nd Test against India on 6 January 2008.
- He won Australian Man of the Series in the 2009 Ashes Series. He was nominated by England team director Andy Flower for his "excellent batting".
- He was named full-time one-day and Test captain of Australia on 29 March 2011.
- Clarke's highest Test batting score of 329* was made on 5 January 2012 against India. This is the highest Test match batting score at the Sydney Cricket Ground, and the now fifth (then fourth) best Test match batting score by an Australian.
- Michael Clarke set the record for the highest Test score by any batsman in Test history when batting at number 5 position (329*) and also he was only the second triple centurion at number 5 position after Donald Bradman
- Clarke made 210 in Adelaide, thereby joining Don Bradman and Wally Hammond as the only players to have made a triple century and a double century in the same series.
- Clarke's score of 259* made at the Gabba on 9 November 2012 against South Africa is the highest Test score at the ground.
- Clarke is the only Test batsman to reach four double centuries in a single calendar year, with a double century (230) at the Adelaide Oval on 22 November 2012.

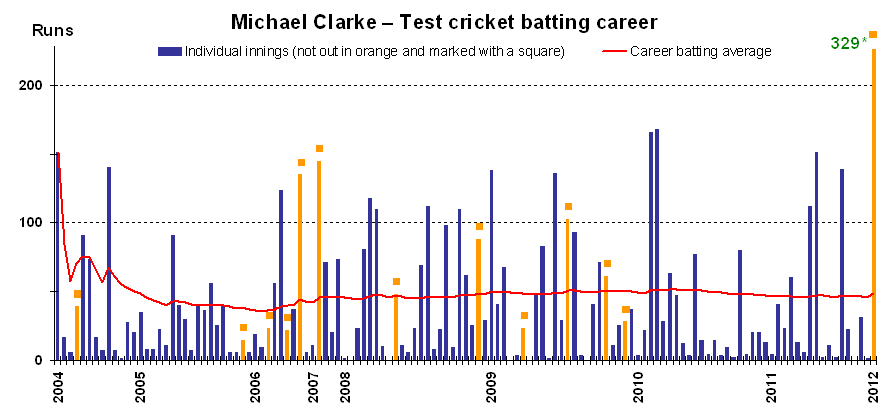
An innings-by-innings breakdown of Clarke's Test match batting career as at 5 January 2012, showing runs scored (bars – not out innings in orange, others in blue) and the career to-date batting average (red line). An alternative image showing a 10 innings moving average is also available.

==== One-Day Internationals ====
- Clarke's highest ODI batting score of 130 was made against India, at M. Chinnaswamy Stadium, Bangalore, 2007
- He was the captain of Australia for the 2009 One Dayers as well as Twenty20 matches vs England
- He was named full-time one-day and Test captain of Australia on 29 March 2011.

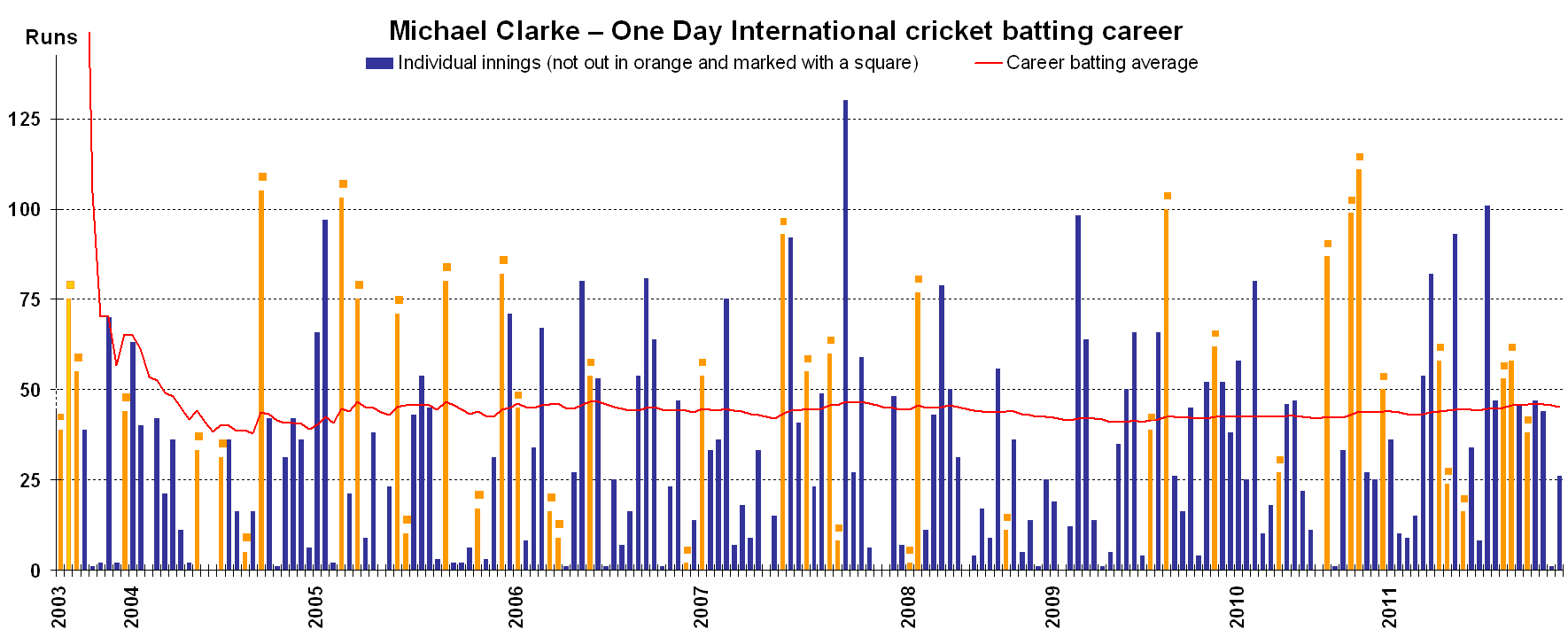
A match-by-match breakdown of Clarke's ODI batting career as at 23 January 2012, showing runs scored (bars – not out innings in orange, others in blue) and the career to-date batting average (red line). An alternative image showing a 10-match moving average is also available.

=== Career best performances ===
Batting
	Score	Fixture	Venue	Season
Test	329*	Australia v India	SCG, Sydney	2012
ODI	130	India v Australia	M. Chinnaswamy Stadium, Bangalore	2007
T20I	67	New Zealand v Australia	AMI Stadium, Christchurch	2010
FC	329*	Australia v India	SCG, Sydney	2012
LA	130	India v Australia	M. Chinnaswamy Stadium, Bangalore	2007
T20	67	New Zealand v Australia	AMI Stadium, Christchurch	2010

== Personal life ==
Clarke was in a relationship with model Lara Bingle until March 2010. Clarke and Bingle became engaged in early 2008, and in May 2008, Clarke withdrew from the Australian cricket team's 2008 tour of the West Indies due to the death of Bingle's father. The pair never married, and they ended their relationship in March 2010, with Clarke leaving the Australian cricket team's ongoing tour of New Zealand to call off their engagement.

Clarke married business owner and model Kyly Boldy on 15 May 2012. The couple went to school together at Westfield Sports High School in Sydney and have one daughter. They announced their separation on 12 February 2020 and said that they had officially separated five months earlier. In 2020, Clarke dated fashion business owner Pip Edwards, but their relationship ended in early 2021.

He was very close to former Australian Test opener Phillip Hughes, and was distraught at the 25-year-old's unexpected death after being hit in the neck by a short-pitched delivery during a Sheffield Shield match at the SCG in November 2014. Clarke gave an emotional speech at Hughes's funeral. He requested Cricket Australia to retire Hughes's shirt number, 64, which was accepted.

In 2016, Clarke published an autobiography, My Story.

In September 2019, Clarke had a skin cancer removed from his forehead. He was first diagnosed with skin cancer in 2006 and became an ambassador for the Cancer Council in 2010.

In January 2023, Clarke and his partner Jade Yarbrough were involved in a public dispute in Noosa. The incident, which was caught on camera, appears to show Yarbrough slap Clarke and accuse him of cheating on her. Yarbrough's brother-in-law and Today Show host Karl Stefanovic was also involved in the incident.

== Media career ==
Between 2016 and 2018, Clarke was a cricket commentator for Nine's Wide World of Sports. In 2020, Clarke began co-hosting the Big Sports Breakfast radio show.

== Books ==
- The Ashes Diary (2013) (ISBN: 9781743289853)
- Captain’s Diary (2014) (ISBN: 9781743518397)
- Ashes Diary 2015 (2015) (ISBN: 9781743547632)
- Michael Clarke: My Story (2016) (ISBN: 9781925483819)
