= 2007–08 Sheffield Shield season =

Cricket tournament

- Administrator: Cricket Australia
- Cricket format: First-class
- Tournament format: Round robin
- Champions: New South Wales (45th title)
- Participants: 6
- Matches: 30, plus final
- Player of the series: Simon Katich (NSW)
- Most runs: Simon Katich (NSW) (1,506)
- Most wickets: Doug Bollinger (NSW) (45)

The 2007–08 Sheffield Shield season, known as the Pura Cup, was the 106th season of official first-class domestic cricket in Australia. Six teams representing six states in Australia participated in the competition. The 2007 competition began on 12 October, when the previous season's champions, Tasmania took on Queensland at the Gabba. New South Wales were crowned champions for the 45th time in their history as they beat Victoria by 258 runs in the Pura Cup final.

== Table ==
The top two teams after each round is played will compete for the Pura Cup final. The match will be contested at the home ground of the side that finishes first. For an explanation of how points are rewarded, see Pura Cup Points System.

Team	Pts	Pld	W	D	L	Quo
New South Wales	39	10	6	4	0	1.680
Victoria	39	10	6	2	2	1.208
Western Australia	32	10	5	2	3	1.326
Tasmania	16	10	2	4	4	0.737
South Australia	14.5	10	2	1	7	0.713
Queensland	12	10	1	3	6	0.705

== Teams ==
Club	Home Ground	Captain
New South Wales Blues	Sydney Cricket Ground	Simon Katich
Queensland Bulls	Brisbane Cricket Ground	Jimmy Maher
Southern Redbacks	Adelaide Oval	Nathan Adcock
Tasmanian Tigers	Bellerive Oval	Daniel Marsh
Victorian Bushrangers	Melbourne Cricket Ground	Cameron White
Western Warriors	WACA Ground	Adam Voges

== Fixtures ==
=== Round 1 ===
12–15 October
Report

Tasmania	v	Queensland (H)
158 (57.5 overs); Travis Birt 36 (78); Brendan Drew 28 (41); Ashley Noffke 5/33 (20 overs)		6/544 dec. (165 overs); Chris Simpson 107* (183); Ashley Noffke 100* (125); Brett Geeves 4/124 (43 overs)
5/457 (142 overs); Michael Di Venuto 178 (350); Daniel Marsh 92* (142); Ashley Noffke 2/114 (43 overs)

Match Drawn
Brisbane Cricket Ground, Brisbane
Umpires: SD Fry and DL Orchard
Player of the match: Ashley Noffke

- Points: Queensland 2, Tasmania 0

14–17 October
Report

New South Wales	v	Western Australia (H)
267 (106.5 overs); Matthew Nicholson 106* (209); Beau Casson 51 (154); Ben Edmondson 4/84 (26.5 overs)		99 (32.5 overs); Steve Magoffin 27* (38); David Bandy 16 (56); Mark Cameron 5/33 (11 overs)
3/300 dec. (89 overs); Phil Jaques 167 (250); Peter Forrest 64 (169); Aaron Heal 2/134 (29 overs)		193 (62.1 overs); Luke Pomersbach 102 (111); Shaun Marsh 34 (112); Doug Bollinger 5/38 (16 overs)

New South Wales won by 275 runs
WACA Ground, Perth
Umpires: IH Lock and PD Parker
Player of the match: Mark Cameron

- Points: New South Wales 6, Western Australia 0

14–17 October
Report

Victoria	v	South Australia (H)
438 (134.1 overs); David Hussey 104 (178); Matthew Wade 83 (139); Ryan Harris 3/81 (35 overs)		249 (87.1 overs); Jason Gillespie 49 (104); Matthew Elliott 42 (101); Gerard Denton 3/42 (14 overs)
4/148 dec. (45 overs); David Hussey 74* (95); Cameron White 38 (85); Ryan Harris 2/21 (9 overs)		77 (39.5 overs); Jason Gillespie 18 (63); Cullen Bailey 17* (41); Peter Siddle 5/27 (10 overs)

Victoria won by 270 runs
Adelaide Oval, Adelaide
Umpires: SJ Davis and BNJ Oxenford
Player of the match: David Hussey

- Points: Victoria 6, South Australia 0

=== Round 2 ===
26–29 October
Report

Queensland	v	New South Wales (H)
467 (126.3 overs); Matthew Hayden 179 (225); Ashley Noffke 50 (65); Michael Clarke 3/22 (12.3 overs)		8/601 dec. (142.3 overs); Simon Katich 306 (351); Brad Haddin 123 (214); Ashley Noffke 5/108 (35.3 overs)
7/398 dec. (102 overs); Chris Simpson 120 (123); Ashley Noffke 78 (112); Stuart Clark 4/71		0/34 (8 overs); Phil Jaques 22* (29); Ed Cowan 12* (19); Ashley Noffke 0/9 (3 overs)

Match Drawn
Sydney Cricket Ground, Sydney
Umpires: RL Parry and SJA Taufel
Player of the match: Simon Katich

- Points: New South Wales 2, Queensland 0

26–29 October
Report

Western Australia	v	Victoria (H)
277 (100.2 overs); Luke Pomersbach 89 (149); Adam Voges 33 (80); Gerard Denton 3/58 (24.2 overs)		114 (60.4 overs); Cameron White 46 (102); Robert Quiney 19 (65); Brad Hogg 3/21 (12.4 overs)
6/289 dec. (79 overs); Shaun Marsh 67 (132); Michael Hussey 59 (146); Cameron White 2/41 (10 overs)		164 (67.5 overs); David Hussey 62 (100); Nick Jewell 34 (85); Brad Hogg 5/62 (18.5 overs)

Western Australia won by 288 runs
Melbourne Cricket Ground, Melbourne
Umpires: DL Orchard and PR Reiffel
Player of the match: Brad Hogg

- Points: Western Australia 6, Victoria 0

29 October – 1 November
Report

South Australia	v	Tasmania (H)
482 (149.4 overs); Graham Manou 190 (315); Jason Gillespie 118* (248); Brett Geeves 5/49 (15 overs)		6/363 dec. (94 overs); Michael Di Venuto 138 (178); Ricky Ponting 96 (151); Dan Cullen 2/47 (18 overs)
7/229 (64 overs); Mark Cosgrove 76 (145); Andy Delmont 56 (111); Adam Griffith 4/79 (24 overs)		4/349 (69.5 overs); Ricky Ponting 124 (152); Michael Dighton 77 (105); Mark Cosgrove 1/25 (6 overs)

Tasmania won by 6 wickets
Bellerive Oval, Hobart
Umpires: SJ Davis and TP Laycock
Player of the match: Ricky Ponting

- Points: Tasmania 6, South Australia 2

=== Round 3 ===
9–12 November
Report

Queensland	v	Western Australia (H)
228 (107.4 overs); Jimmy Maher 111 (296); Ashley Noffke 34 (76); Matthew Inness 5/38 (31.4 overs)		5/565 dec. (142 overs); Luke Pomersbach 176 (207); Shaun Marsh 166* (321); James Hopes 2/48 (32 overs)
167 (72.1 overs); Ashley Noffke 44 (66); Jimmy Maher 32 (103); Brad Hogg 5/77 (25.1 overs)

Western Australia won by an innings and 170 runs
WACA Ground, Perth
Umpires: JK Brookes and PR Reiffel
Player of the match: Luke Pomersbach

- Points: Western Australia 6, Queensland 0

9–12 November
Report

Tasmania	v	Victoria (H)
235 (107.5 overs); Jason Krejza 42* (131); Travis Birt 37 (89); Bryce McGain 5/68 (32.5 overs)		408 (135.2 overs); Matthew Wade 95 (195); Brad Hodge 93 (193); Jason Krejza 4/91 (29.2 overs)
169 (55.1 overs); Travis Birt 51 (80); Dan Marsh 35 (58); Gerard Denton 6/32 (20.1 overs)

Victoria won by an innings and 4 runs
Melbourne Cricket Ground, Melbourne
Umpires: BNJ Oxenford and JD Ward
Player of the match: Gerard Denton

- Points: Victoria 6, Tasmania 0

9–12 November
Report

(H) South Australia	v	New South Wales
178 (70 overs); Callum Ferguson 83 (178); Jason Gillespie 19* (65); Nathan Bracken 4/50 (20 overs)		309 (110.4 overs); Simon Katich 117 (182); Matthew Nicholson 44 (97); Mark Cleary 3/40 (14 overs)
291 (103.1 overs); Callum Ferguson 59 (91); Ryan Harris 42* (89); Nathan Bracken 4/57 (26.1 overs)		3/162 (48.2 overs); Dominic Thornley 80* (104); Simon Katich 63* (128); Ryan Harris 1/23 (13.2 overs)

New South Wales won by 7 wickets
Adelaide Oval, Adelaide
Umpires: SD Fry and IH Lock
Player of the match: Simon Katich

- Points: New South Wales 6, South Australia 0

=== Round 4 ===
18–21 November
Report

Victoria	v	Queensland (H)
113 (47.5 overs); Robert Quiney 31 (64); Matthew Wade 22 (60); Ashley Noffke 6/33 (18 overs)		341 (116 overs); Ashley Noffke 82 (148); Aaron Nye 57 (142); Allan Wise 3/63 (32 overs)
5/581 dec. (136 overs); Brad Hodge 286* (385); Nick Jewell 188 (335); Aaron Nye 2/89 (27.2 overs)		77 (31.1 overs); Chris Hartley 26 (42); Chris Swan 13 (19); Clinton McKay 4/31 (10 overs)

Victoria won by 276 runs
Brisbane Cricket Ground, Brisbane
Umpires: NS McNamara and RJ Tucker
Player of the match: Brad Hodge

- Points: Victoria 6, Queensland 2

20–23 November
Report

(H) New South Wales	v	Tasmania
7/512 dec. (130 overs); Peter Forrest 177 (246); Brad Haddin 100 (169); Luke Butterworth 2/57 (22 overs)		214 (78.2 overs); George Bailey 86 (141); Michael Dighton 63 (142); Doug Bollinger 6/68 (21 overs)
		263 (84.1 overs); Luke Butterworth 116 (230); Travis Birt 77 (134); Doug Bollinger 6/63 (16 overs)

New South Wales won by an innings and 35 runs
Sydney Cricket Ground, Sydney
Umpires: RD Goodger and IH Lock
Player of the match: Doug Bollinger

- Points: New South Wales 6, Tasmania 0

23–26 November
Report

Western Australia	v	South Australia (H)
236 (73 overs); Brad Hogg 68 (42); Adam Voges 58 (155); Jason Gillespie 7/58 (20 overs)		397 (104.4 overs); Darren Lehmann 167 (185); Callum Ferguson 81 (139); Mathew Inness 6/83 (20 overs)
190 (81.2 overs); Liam Davis 42 (117); Justin Langer 37 (86); Nathan Adcock 3/30 (11 overs)		1/30 (4.2 overs); Mark Cosgrove 17 (13); Matthew Elliott 5* (7); Mathew Inness 1/11 (2.2 overs)

South Australia won by 9 wickets
Adelaide Oval, Adelaide
Umpires: DL Orchard and RL Parry
Player of the match: Darren Lehmann

- Points: South Australia 6, Western Australia 0

=== Round 5 ===
30 November – 2 December
Report

(H) Queensland	v	South Australia
308 (81.3 overs); Chris Simpson 89 (97); James Hopes 59 (104); Shaun Tait 3/69 (19 overs)		366 (92.2 overs); Matthew Elliott 78 (105); Andy Delmont 64 (123); Ashley Noffke 4/73 (27.2 overs)
137 (52.1 overs); Ashley Noffke 60 (116); Chris Simpson 16 (71); Shaun Tait 7/29 (16.1 overs)		4/80 (19.1 overs); Nathan Adcock 49* (48); Shane Deitz 10 (33); Mitchell Johnson 3/33 (10 overs)

South Australia won by 6 wickets
Brisbane Cricket Ground, Brisbane
Umpires: DL Orchard and JD Ward
Player of the match: Shaun Tait

- Points: South Australia 6, Queensland 0

30 November – 3 December
Report

New South Wales	v	Victoria (H)
9/253 dec. (86 overs); Simon Katich 141 (239); Brad Haddin 43 (64); Dirk Nannes 4/49 (15 overs)		8/256 dec. (96.4 overs); David Hussey 95 (166); Brad Hodge 32 (102); Nathan Bracken 4/40 (25 overs)
7/323 dec. (103 overs); Greg Mail 125 (276); Dominic Thornley 76 (154); Bryce McGain 5/112 (41 overs)		2/117 (42 overs); Robert Quiney 52 (130); Nick Jewell 49 (100); Matthew Nicholson 1/8 (3 overs)

Match drawn
Melbourne Cricket Ground, Melbourne
Umpires: RL Parry and AP Ward
Player of the match: Simon Katich

- Points: Victoria 2, New South Wales 0

3–6 December
Report

Western Australia	v	Tasmania (H)
8/511 dec. (130.2 overs); Adam Voges 180 (260); Chris Rogers 123 (199); Brendan Drew 3/95 (28 overs)		343 (117.5 overs); Dan Marsh 117 (196); George Bailey 68 (159); Steve Magoffin 5/53 (26 overs)
2/353 dec. (94 overs); Justin Langer 121 (144); Chris Rogers 87 (169); Ben Hilfenhaus 1/61 (18 overs)		1/75 (22 overs); Michael Di Venuto 50* (64); Travis Birt 13* (21); Darren Wates 1/39 (7 overs)

Match drawn
Bellerive Oval, Hobart
Umpires: SD Fry and BNJ Oxenford

- Western Australia 2, Tasmania 0

=== Round 6 ===
10–12 December
Report

(H) Tasmania	v	Victoria
168 (55.4 overs); George Bailey 40 (94); Chris Duval 27 (34); Shane Harwood 4/53 (18 overs)		399 (120.1 overs); David Hussey 103 (115); Michael Klinger 60 (168); Brett Geeves 3/73 (25.1 overs)
277 (94.5 overs); Tim Paine 62 (127); Travis Birt 60 (139); Peter Siddle 5/61 (23 overs)		2/47 (8.2 overs); David Hussey 31* (25); Michael Klinger 11 (23); Ben Hilfenhaus 2/31 (4.2 overs)

Victoria won by 8 wickets
Bellerive Oval, Hobart
Umpires: JK Brookes and TP Laycock
Player of the match: David Hussey

- Points: Victoria 6, Tasmania 0

14–17 December
Report

New South Wales	v	Queensland (H)
438 (123.5 overs); Simon Katich 86 (122); Grant Lambert 86 (139); Ashley Noffke 5/115 (32.5 overs)		236 (77.4 overs); Aaron Nye 61 (113); Ashley Noffke 51 (85); Doug Bollinger 4/55 (19 overs)
7/209 dec. (49.2 overs); Phil Jaques 63 (87); Simon Katich 54 (75); Ashley Noffke 2/38 (11 overs)		151 (52.5 overs); Clinton Perren 31 (63); Ryan Broad 24 (68); Matthew Nicholson 3/25 (8.5 overs)

New South Wales won by 260 runs
Brisbane Cricket Ground, Brisbane
Umpires: IH Lock and PR Reiffel
Player of the match: Matthew Nicholson

- Points: New South Wales 6, Queensland 0

14–16 December
Report

South Australia	v	Western Australia (H)
184 (63.4 overs); Jason Gillespie 51* (83); Dan Cullen 39 (79); Matthew Inness 5/59 (17.4 overs)		332 (87 overs); Justin Langer 109 (157); Luke Pomersbach 75 (72); Ryan Harris 4/77 (28 overs)
208 (63.2 overs); Callum Ferguson 56 (100); Mark Cosgrove 55 (92); Brett Dorey 5/82 (25 overs)		3/61 (20 overs); Shaun Marsh 23* (49); Luke Pomersbach 18* (14); Jason Gillespie 2/27 (8 overs)

Western Australia won by 7 wickets
WACA Ground, Perth
Umpires: PD Parker and RJ Tucker
Player of the match: Justin Langer

- Points: Western Australia 6, South Australia 0

=== Round 7 ===
21–24 January
Report

(H) Tasmania	v	Queensland
454 (127 overs); Daniel Marsh 134 (190); George Bailey 104 (132); Ashley Noffke 5/79 (30 overs)		200 (74.2 overs); James Hopes 87 (112); Shane Watson 44 (82); Brett Geeves 5/51 (23.2 overs)
1/88 (21.3 overs); George Bailey 51* (51); Travis Birt 31* (63); Michael Kasprowicz 1/16 (5 overs)		341 (127.1 overs) (FO); James Hopes 84 (175); Clinton Perren 71 (177); Jason Krejza 3/114 (31.1 overs)

Tasmania won by 9 wickets
Bellerive Oval, Hobart
Umpires: RL Parry and SD Fry
Player of the match: Daniel Marsh

- Points: Tasmania 6, Queensland 0

21–24 January
Report

South Australia	v	Victoria (H)
320 (89.5 overs); Graham Manou 105* (161); Matthew Elliott 34 (80); Andrew McDonald 4/69 (21.5 overs)		301 (89 overs); Andrew McDonald 139 (183); Brad Hodge 64 (120); Mark Cleary 3/61 (19 overs)
244 (80.3 overs); Daniel Christian 55 (135); Ryan Harris 37* (46); Peter Siddle 6/57 (20.3 overs)		6/264 (82.1 overs); Nick Jewell 91* (244); David Hussey 53 (45); Mark Cleary 3/56 (20.1 overs)

Victoria won by 4 wickets
Junction Oval, Melbourne
Umpires: PR Reiffel and AP Ward
Player of the match: Andrew McDonald

- Points: Victoria 6, South Australia 2

25–28 January
Report

Western Australia	v	New South Wales (H)
389 (122.3 overs); Liam Davis 116 (239); Adam Voges 84 (151); Doug Bollinger 5/78 (28 overs)		485 (140.5 overs); Simon Katich 189 (303); Beau Casson 72* (143); Ben Edmondson 4/110 (29 overs)
170 (63.5 overs); Luke Pomersbach 81 (153); Marcus North 37 (70); Doug Bollinger 5/48 (16.5 overs)		1/78 (20 overs); Phillip Hughes 54* (67); Peter Forrest 14* (32); Steve Magoffin 1/22 (5 overs)

New South Wales won by 9 wickets
Sydney Cricket Ground, Sydney
Umpires: RJ Tucker and JD Ward
Player of the match: Doug Bollinger

- Points: New South Wales 6, Western Australia 0

=== Round 8 ===
8–11 February
Report

(H) South Australia	v	Tasmania
344 (116.2 overs); Daniel Harris 120 (317); Shane Deitz 59 (95); Ben Hilfenhaus 4/80 (27.2 overs)		383 (116.3 overs); Daniel Marsh 109 (192); Michael Di Venuto 73 (113); Ryan Harris 7/108 (32 overs)
9/318 dec. (88 overs); Graham Manou 98 (143); Callum Ferguson 54 (73); Brett Geeves 5/79 (24 overs)		8/232 (52 overs); Michael Di Venuto 66 (92); George Bailey 57 (52); Dan Cullen 3/76 (17 overs)

Match Drawn
Adelaide Oval, Adelaide
Umpires: SD Fry and IH Lock

- Points: Tasmania 2, South Australia 0

11–14 February
Report

(H) Queensland	v	Western Australia
310 (112 overs); Shane Watson 80 (142); Chris Simpson 61 (119); Ben Edmondson 7/95 (28 overs)		2/115 dec. (33 overs); Justin Langer 51* (53); Shaun Marsh 20 (67); Michael Kasprowicz 1/20 (7 overs)
8/156 dec. (44 overs); Shane Watson 39 (92); Ashley Noffke 34 (30); Steve Magoffin 3/28 (10 overs)		9/278 (79 overs); Chris Rogers 116 (170); Liam Davis 51 (104); Michael Kasprowicz 3/57 (17 overs)

Match Drawn
Brisbane Cricket Ground, Brisbane
Umpires: TP Laycock and DL Orchard

- Points: Queensland 2, Western Australia 0

15–18 February
Report

Victoria	v	New South Wales (H)
394 (114 overs); Brad Hodge 119 (212); David Hussey 86 (132); Mark Cameron 6/101 (33 overs)		394 (137.5 overs); Usman Khawaja 85 (173); Simon Katich 71 (89); Bryce McGain 3/100 (36.5 overs)
240 (83.2 overs); Andrew McDonald 64 (176); Cameron White 49 (99); Beau Casson 5/97 (38.2 overs)		4/122 (46 overs); Phil Jaques 29 (59); Dominic Thornley 23* (79); Andrew McDonald 2/16 (9 overs)

Match Drawn
Sydney Cricket Ground, Sydney
Umpires: JK Brookes and JD Ward
Player of the match: Mark Cameron

- Points: New South Wales 1, Victoria 1

=== Round 9 ===
29 February – 3 March
Report

(H) Tasmania	v	New South Wales
398 (136.1 overs); Michael Di Venuto 144 (218); Tim Paine 72 (182); Mark Cameron 3/111 (34.1 overs)		9/298 dec. (96 overs); Simon Katich 129 (206); Phillip Hughes 73 (160); Brett Geeves 4/92 (25 overs)
9/283 dec. (75.4 overs); George Bailey 79 (117); Daniel Marsh 59 (114); Mark Cameron 4/56 (16 overs)		3/153 (41 overs); Phillip Hughes 58* (122); Simon Katich 40 (47); Ben Hilfenhaus 2/42 (12 overs)

Match Drawn
Bellerive Oval, Hobart
Umpires: PD Parker and JD Ward
Player of the match: Michael Di Venuto

- Points: Tasmania 2, New South Wales 0

29 February – 3 March
Report

(H) Western Australia	v	Victoria
428 (117 overs); Chris Rogers 166 (221); Shaun Marsh 53 (113); Allan Wise 2/57 (22 overs)		251 (78.1 overs); David Hussey 84 (112); Cameron White 61 (93); Steve Magoffin 5/67 (20 overs)
5/277 dec. (71.5 overs); Shaun Marsh 96 (196); Adam Voges 79 (115); Shane Harwood 2/37 (10 overs)		334 (95 overs); Cameron White 149* (196); Brad Hodge 45 (107); Marcus North 3/53 (20 overs)

Western Australia won by 120 runs
WACA Ground, Perth
Umpires: RL Parry and RJ Tucker
Player of the match: Chris Rogers

- Points: Western Australia 6, Victoria 0

29 February – 3 March
Report

(H) South Australia	v	Queensland
237 (89.2 overs); Mark Cleary 57 (73); Ryan Harris 55 (114); Ashley Noffke 3/43 (26 overs)		8/456 dec. (164.2 overs); Shane Watson 190 (323); Chris Hartley 95 (244); Ryan Harris 4/93 (39.2 overs)
210 (80.1 overs); Daniel Christian 72 (206); Jason Gillespie 51 (127); Ashley Noffke 3/41 (21.1 overs)

Queensland won by an innings and 9 runs
Adelaide Oval, Adelaide
Umpires: IH Lock and PR Reiffel
Player of the match: Shane Watson

- Points: Queensland 6, South Australia 0

=== Round 10 ===
7–9 March
Report

South Australia	v	New South Wales (H)
128 (55.4 overs); Cullen Bailey 26 (50); Shane Deitz 21 (70); Stuart MacGill 5/49 (17.4 overs)		7/493 dec. (149 overs); Dominic Thornley 169* (395); Brad Haddin 113 (159); Dan Cullen 4/58 (16 overs)
203 (64.4 overs); Daniel Harris 71 (175); Graham Manou 54 (71); Mark Cameron 4/34 (18 overs)

New South Wales won by an innings and 162 runs
Sydney Cricket Ground, Sydney
Umpires: RL Parry and PR Reiffel
Player of the match: Dominic Thornley

- Points: New South Wales 6, South Australia 0

7–9 March
Report

Queensland	v	Victoria (H)
191 (92.5 overs); Ryan Broad 75 (215); Shane Watson 26 (74); Clinton McKay 4/35 (20 overs)		9/322 dec. (92 overs); David Hussey 92 (137); Cameron White 73 (118); Scott Brant 4/59 (22 overs)
205 (72.5 overs); Ryan Broad 107 (222); Shane Watson 32 (45); Clinton McKay 3/69 (16 overs)		4/76 (20 overs); Cameron White 28* (33); Robert Quiney 14 (32); Scott Brant 2/19 (8 overs)

Victoria won by 6 wickets
Melbourne Cricket Ground, Melbourne
Umpires: IH Lock and RJ Tucker

- Points: Victoria 6, Queensland 0

7–10 March
Report

(H) Western Australia	v	Tasmania
372 (81 overs); Justin Langer 131 (162); Shaun Marsh 63 (106); Tim Macdonald 3/44 (14 overs)		207 (73.5 overs); Michael Di Venuto 64 (145); Daniel Marsh 51 (106); Brett Dorey 4/45 (11.5 overs)
8/318 dec. (77.5 overs); Luke Ronchi 93 (76); Marcus North 69 (172); Brett Geeves 2/50 (9 overs)		261 (81 overs); Luke Butterworth 79 (93); Dane Anderson 47 (119); Matthew Inness 4/44 (19 overs)

Western Australia won by 222 runs
WACA Ground, Perth
Umpires: BNJ Oxenford and PD Parker
Player of the match: Justin Langer

- Points: Western Australia 6, Tasmania 0

== Final ==
15–19 March
Report

(H) New South Wales	v	Victoria
281 (94.1 overs); Simon Katich 86 (145); Brad Haddin 63 (99); Peter Siddle 5/66 (22 overs)		216 (71 overs); Brad Hodge 84 (144); Nick Jewell 28 (78); Brett Lee 4/72 (19 overs)
8/563 dec. (165.3 overs); Phillip Hughes 116 (175); Brett Lee 97 (220); Peter Siddle 4/101 (24.3 overs)		370 (77.3 overs); Nick Jewell 99 (151); Cameron White 57 (72); Beau Casson 4/126 (29.3 overs)

New South Wales won by 258 runs
Sydney Cricket Ground, Sydney
Umpires: RL Parry and RJ Tucker
Player of the match: Simon Katich

- New South Wales are 2007–08 Pura Cup champions

== Statistics ==
=== Highest Team Totals ===
Team	Total	Opponent	Ground
New South Wales	8/601 dec.	Queensland	Sydney Cricket Ground
Victoria	5/581 dec.	Queensland	Brisbane Cricket Ground
Western Australia	5/565 dec.	Queensland	WACA Ground
New South Wales	8/563 dec.	Victoria	Sydney Cricket Ground
Queensland	6/544 dec.	Tasmania	Brisbane Cricket Ground

=== Most Runs ===
Player	Runs	Inns	Avg	HS	100s	50s
Simon Katich (New South Wales)	1,506	17	94.12	306	5	8
David Hussey (Victoria)	1,008	20	56.00	104	2	8
Michael Di Venuto (Tasmania)	947	19	52.61	178	3	5
Justin Langer (Western Australia)	770	19	45.29	131	3	2
Brad Hodge (Victoria)	762	17	47.62	134	2	3

=== Highest Scores ===
Player	Score	Opponent	Ground	4s	6s
Simon Katich (New South Wales)	306	Queensland	Sydney Cricket Ground	30	9
Brad Hodge (Victoria)	286*	Queensland	Brisbane Cricket Ground	34	4
Graham Manou (South Australia)	190	Tasmania	Bellerive Oval	22	0
Shane Watson (Queensland)	190	South Australia	Adelaide Oval	19	3
Simon Katich (New South Wales)	189	Western Australia	Sydney Cricket Ground	27	0

=== Most Wickets ===
Player	Wkts	Mts	Ave	S/R	BBI	BBM	5WI	10WM
Doug Bollinger (New South Wales)	45	7	15.44	31.1	6/63	12/131	5	2
Ashley Noffke (Queensland)	43	9	21.25	47.4	6/33	7/147	5	0
Matthew Inness (Western Australia)	40	9	20.12	43.5	6/83	7/94	3	0
Bryce McGain (Victoria)	38	11	34.15	67.4	5/68	6/128	2	0
Ryan Harris (South Australia)	37	10	29.86	60.3	7/108	9/171	1	0

=== Best Bowling Figures (Innings) ===
Player	Overs	Figures	Opponent	Ground
Shaun Tait (South Australia)	16.1	7/29	Queensland	Brisbane Cricket Ground
Jason Gillespie (South Australia)	20.0	7/58	Western Australia	Adelaide Oval
Ben Edmondson (Western Australia)	28.0	7/95	Queensland	Brisbane Cricket Ground
Ryan Harris (South Australia)	32.0	7/108	Tasmania	Adelaide Oval
Gerard Denton (Victoria)	20.1	6/32	Tasmania	Melbourne Cricket Ground

== See also ==
- Australian One Day Domestic season 2007-08
- KFC Twenty20 Big Bash season 2007-08
- Australian cricket team in 2007-08
