= Australian cricket team in 2008 =

This article contains information, results and statistics regarding the Australian national cricket team in the 2008 season. Statisticians class the 2008 season as matches played on tours that started between May 2008 and August 2008.

== Player contracts ==
The 2008–09 list was announced on 9 April 2008. Note that uncontracted players still are available for selection for the national cricket team.

Player	Age as at 18 March 2025	State	Test cap	ODI cap	ODI shirt
Ricky Ponting (captain)	50 years, 89 days	TAS	366	123	14
Michael Clarke (vice-captain)	43 years, 350 days	NSW	389	149	23
Doug Bollinger	43 years, 237 days	NSW			18
Nathan Bracken	47 years, 187 days	NSW	387	142	59
Beau Casson	42 years, 101 days	NSW	401		15
Stuart Clark	49 years, 171 days	NSW	396	153	8
Brad Haddin	47 years, 146 days	NSW	400	144	57
Matthew Hayden	53 years, 140 days	QLD	359	111	28
Ben Hilfenhaus	42 years, 3 days	TAS		161	29
Brad Hodge	50 years, 79 days	VIC	394	154	17
James Hopes	46 years, 145 days	QLD		151	39
David Hussey	47 years, 246 days	VIC			29
Michael Hussey	49 years, 295 days	WA	393	150	48
Phil Jaques	45 years, 319 days	NSW	395	158	5
Mitchell Johnson	43 years, 136 days	QLD	398	156	25
Simon Katich	49 years, 209 days	NSW	384	143	13
Brett Lee	48 years, 130 days	NSW	383	140	58
Shaun Marsh	41 years, 252 days	WA			9
Ashley Noffke	47 years, 322 days	QLD		164	22
Andrew Symonds	49 years, 282 days	QLD	388	139	63
Shaun Tait	42 years, 24 days	SA	392	162	32
Adam Voges	45 years, 165 days	WA		163	24
Shane Watson	43 years, 274 days	QLD	391	148	33
Cameron White	41 years, 212 days	VIC	402	152	7

== Match summary ==
Format	P	W	L	D	T	NR
Twenty20 International	3	2	1	–	–	–
One Day International	8	8	–	–	–	–
Tests	3	2	-	1	–	–
Total	12	10	1	1	-	-

M = Matches Played, W = Won, L = Lost, D = Drawn, T = Tied, NR = No Result

Series Summary

- Australia retained the Frank Worrell Trophy against the West Indies 2–0
- Australia won the ODI series against the West Indies 5–0
- Australia won the ODI series against Bangladesh 3–0

== Tour of West Indies ==
Australia's tour of the West Indies commenced on 16 May with a tour match against a Jamaica Select XI in Trelawny and will conclude on 6 July with a One Day International in Basseterre.

=== Tour matches ===
==== Tour Match: 16–18 May, Trelawny ====
16–18 May
14:00 UTC
Scorecard
Report

Jamaica Select XI	v	Australia
297 (69 overs); Carlton Baugh 111* (112); Xavier Marshall 30 (??); Stuart MacGill 4/79 (21 overs)		396 (113.3 overs); Simon Katich 97 (193); Andrew Symonds 86 (104); Donovan Sinclair 3/14 (6.3 overs)
194 (58.2 overs); Carlton Baugh 36 (38); Xavier Marshall 31 (59); Simon Katich 4/15 (5.2 overs)		1/65 (13.3 overs); Simon Katich 37* (49); Ricky Ponting 20* (27); Andre Russell 1/25 (7 overs)

Match Drawn
Trelawny Stadium, Jamaica
Umpires: Vivian Johnson & Norman Malcolm
Player of the match: Simon Katich

==== Tour Match: 21 June, Bridgetown ====
21 June
14:00 UTC
Scorecard
Report

Australia; 6/337 (50 overs)	v	(Cricket West Indies) UWI Vice Chancellor's XI; 126 (33.1 overs)
Shane Watson 95 (85); David Hussey 55 (??); Kemar Roach 2/47 (8 overs)		Denesh Ramdin 43 (??); Darren Sammy 12 (??); Nathan Bracken 3/25 (8 overs)

Australia won by 211 runs
Three Ws Oval, Bridgetown, Barbados
Umpires: Vincent Bullen & Anthony Farrell
Player of the match: Shane Watson

=== Test series ===
==== First Test: 22–26 May, Kingston ====
Australian XI: Phil Jaques, Simon Katich, Ricky Ponting (c), Michael Hussey, Brad Hodge, Andrew Symonds, Brad Haddin (wk), Brett Lee, Mitchell Johnson, Stuart Clark, Stuart MacGill

22–26 May
15:00 UTC
Scorecard
Report

Australia	v	West Indies
431 (126.5 overs); Ricky Ponting 158 (224); Andrew Symonds 70* (115); Fidel Edwards 5/104 (26.5 overs)		312 (106 overs); Shivnarine Chanderpaul 118 (276); Runako Morton 67 (135); Stuart Clark 3/59 (19 overs)
167 (56.5 overs); Andrew Symonds 79 (118); Brad Hodge 27 (53); Dwayne Bravo 4/47 (18.5 overs)		191 (67 overs); Denesh Ramdin 36 (61); Darren Sammy 35 (80); Stuart Clark 5/32 (20 overs)

Australia won by 95 runs
Sabina Park, Kingston, Jamaica
Umpires: Aleem Dar & Russell Tiffin
Player of the match: Stuart Clark

- Australia led the series 1–0

Test debut: Brad Haddin

==== Second Test: 30 May-3 June, North Sound ====
Australian XI: Phil Jaques, Simon Katich, Ricky Ponting (c), Michael Hussey, Michael Clarke, Andrew Symonds, Brad Haddin (wk), Brett Lee, Mitchell Johnson, Stuart Clark, Stuart MacGill

30 May – 3 June
14:00 UTC
Scorecard
Report

Australia	v	West Indies
7/479 dec. (136 overs); Simon Katich 113 (248); Michael Clarke 110 (187); Jerome Taylor 3/95 (27 overs)		352 (107 overs); Shivnarine Chanderpaul 107* (236); Ramnaresh Sarwan 65 (146); Brett Lee 5/59 (21 overs)
6/244 dec. (61.5 overs); Phil Jaques 76 (136); Andrew Symonds 43* (53); Fidel Edwards 2/28 (7.5 overs)		5/266 (93 overs); Ramnaresh Sarwan 128 (241); Shivnarine Chanderpaul 77* (180); Brett Lee 3/51 (21 overs)

Match Drawn
Sir Vivian Richards Stadium, North Sound, Antigua
Umpires: Mark Benson & Russell Tiffin
Player of the match: Shivnarine Chanderpaul

- Australia led the series 1–0

==== Third Test: 12–16 June, Bridgetown ====
Australian XI: Phil Jaques, Simon Katich, Ricky Ponting (c), Michael Hussey, Michael Clarke, Andrew Symonds, Brad Haddin (wk), Beau Casson, Brett Lee, Mitchell Johnson, Stuart Clark

12–16 June
14:00 UTC
Scorecard
Report

Australia	v	West Indies
251 (68 overs); Andrew Symonds 52 (84); Simon Katich 36 (72); Jerome Taylor 3/46 (12 overs)		216 (58.5 overs); Shivnarine Chanderpaul 79* (142); Xavier Marshall 39 (61); Mitchell Johnson 4/41 (11.5 overs)
5/439 dec. (145 overs); Simon Katich 157 (332); Phil Jaques 108 (224); Sulieman Benn 3/154 (47 overs)		387 (105.4 overs); Xavier Marshall 85 (146); Dwayne Bravo 69 (133); Stuart Clark 3/58 (24 overs)

Australia won by 87 runs
Kensington Oval, Bridgetown, Barbados
Umpires: Mark Benson & Aleem Dar
Player of the match: Simon Katich

- Australia won the series 2–0 and retained the Frank Worrell Trophy

Test debut: Beau Casson

Man of the Series: Shivnarine Chanderpaul

=== Twenty20 International ===
==== Only Twenty20 International: 20 June, Bridgetown ====
20 June
18:00 UTC
Scorecard
Report

Australia; 3/97 (11 overs)	v	West Indies; 3/102 (9.1 overs)
Luke Ronchi 36 (22); Shaun Marsh 29 (22); Kemar Roach 2/29 (3 overs)		Xavier Marshall 36 (15); Dwayne Bravo 28 (15); Shane Watson 1/17 (2.1 overs)

West Indies won by 7 wickets
Kensington Oval, Bridgetown, Barbados
Umpires: Billy Doctrove & Clyde Duncan
Player of the match: Xavier Marshall

Twenty20 International debuts: Shaun Marsh, Luke Ronchi

=== One Day International series ===
==== First ODI: 24 June, Kingstown ====
24 June
13:30 UTC
Scorecard
Report

Australia; 8/273 (50 overs)	v	West Indies; 189 (39.5 overs)
Shaun Marsh 81 (97); Brad Haddin 50 (52); Darren Sammy 2/31 (7 overs)		Darren Sammy 33 (35); Dwayne Bravo 33 (37); Nathan Bracken 4/31 (5.5 overs)

Australia won by 84 runs
Arnos Vale Stadium, Kingstown, St. Vincent and the Grenadines
Umpires: Asad Rauf & Billy Doctrove
Player of the match: Shaun Marsh

- Australia led the series 1–0

One Day International debut: Shaun Marsh

==== Second ODI: 27 June, St George's ====
27 June
13:30 UTC
Scorecard
Report

Australia; 5/213 (50 overs)	v	West Indies; 8/140 (41 overs)
Michael Hussey 62 (105); Michael Clarke 56 (98); Jerome Taylor 2/47 (10 overs)		Shivnarine Chanderpaul 45* (77); Sulieman Benn 23* (26); Michael Clarke 3/26 (6 overs)

Australia won by 63 runs (D/L method)
Cricket National Stadium, St George's, Grenada
Umpires: Asad Rauf & Norman Malcolm
Player of the match: Michael Clarke

- Australia led the series 2–0

One Day International debut: Luke Ronchi

==== Third ODI: 29 June, St George's ====
29 June
13:30 UTC
Scorecard
Report

West Indies; 223 (48 overs)	v	Australia; 3/227 (40.3 overs)
Chris Gayle 53 (54); Xavier Marshall 35 (65); Nathan Bracken 3/26 (9 overs)		Shane Watson 126 (122); Ricky Ponting 69 (83); Darren Sammy 1/20 (4 overs)

Australia won by 7 wickets
Cricket National Stadium, St George's, Grenada
Umpires: Asad Rauf & Norman Malcolm
Player of the match: Shane Watson

- Australia led the series 3–0

==== Fourth ODI: 4 July, Basseterre ====
4 July
13:30 UTC
Scorecard
Report

Australia; 8/282 (50 overs)	v	West Indies; 6/281 (50 overs)
Andrew Symonds 87 (78); David Hussey 50 (51); Fidel Edwards 2/53 (10 overs)		Chris Gayle 92 (92); Ramnaresh Sarwan 63 (79); Brett Lee 3/64 (10 overs)

Australia won by 1 run
Warner Park, Basseterre, Saint Kitts and Nevis
Umpires: Asad Rauf & Steve Bucknor
Player of the match: Andrew Symonds

- Australia led the series 4–0

One Day International debut: David Hussey

==== Fifth ODI: 6 July, Basseterre ====
6 July
13:30 UTC
Scorecard
Report

Australia; 8/341 (50 overs)	v	West Indies; 172 (39.5 overs)
Andrew Symonds 66 (80); Luke Ronchi 64 (28); Ramnaresh Sarwan 3/57 (9 overs)		Shawn Findlay 59 (74); Shivnarine Chanderpaul 38 (49); Mitchell Johnson 5/29 (7.5 overs)

Australia won by 169 runs
Warner Park, Basseterre, Saint Kitts and Nevis
Umpires: Asad Rauf & Steve Bucknor
Player of the match: Luke Ronchi

- Australia won the series 5–0

Man of the Series: Shane Watson

== Bangladesh in Australia ==
Bangladesh will travel to Australia for a 3 match One Day International series at the end of August.

=== Practice matches ===
==== Practice match: 28 August, Darwin ====
28 August
Scorecard
Report

Australia; 177 (49.4 overs)	v	(Australia) AIS; 123 (33.5 overs)
Michael Hussey 69 (95); Cameron White 31 (40); Grant Sullivan 3/37 (8.4 overs)		Michael Hill 34 (67); Moises Henriques 16 (19); Mitchell Johnson 3/5 (4 overs)

Australia won by 54 runs
TIO Stadium, Darwin
Umpires: Bruce Oxenford & Rod Tucker

=== One Day International series ===
==== First ODI: 30 August, Darwin ====
30 August
00:00 UTC
Scorecard
Report

Australia; 8/254 (50 overs)	v	Bangladesh; 74 (27.4 overs)
Michael Hussey 85 (87); Shaun Marsh 76 (105); Shahadat Hossain 3/42 (6 overs)		Tamim Iqbal 21 (31); Raqibul Hasan 14 (50); Cameron White 3/5 (1.4 overs)

Australia won by 180 runs
TIO Stadium, Darwin
Umpires: Peter Parker & Amiesh Saheba
Player of the match: Michael Hussey

- Australia led the series 1–0

One Day International debut: Brett Geeves

==== Second ODI: 3 September, Darwin ====
3 September
00:00 UTC
Scorecard
Report

Bangladesh; 117 (36.1 overs)	v	Australia; 2/118 (22.4 overs)
Dhiman Ghosh 30 (36); Junaid Siddique 21 (44); Mitchell Johnson 3/17 (6.1 overs)		Shaun Marsh 69 (81); Shane Watson 29 (33); Shakib Al Hasan 2/38 (6.4 overs)

Australia won by 8 wickets
TIO Stadium, Darwin
Umpires: Bruce Oxenford & Amiesh Saheba
Player of the match: Shaun Marsh

- Australia led the series 2–0

==== Third ODI: 6 September, Darwin ====
6 September
00:00 UTC
Scorecard
Report

Australia; 5/198 (50 overs)	v	Bangladesh; 125 (29.5 overs)
Michael Hussey 57 (72); Shaun Marsh 30 (36); Abdur Razzak 1/22 (10 overs)		Tamim Iqbal 63 (69); Shakib Al Hasan 27 (29); James Hopes 3/30 (5 overs)

Australia won by 73 runs
TIO Stadium, Darwin
Umpires: Peter Parker & Amiesh Saheba
Player of the match: Tamim Iqbal

- Australia won the series 3–0

Man of the Series: Michael Hussey

== Statistics ==
=== Matches Played ===
The following is a table of statistics charting appearances by Australian cricketers in the 2008 season. The minimum requirement for inclusion is one match played. The players will be arranged in alphabetical order.

No.	Player	T20I	ODI	Test	Total
15	Beau Casson	-	–	1	1
8	Stuart Clark	-	–	3	3
23	Michael Clarke	1	-	2	3
57	Brad Haddin	-	-	3	3
17	Brad Hodge	-	–	1	1
39	James Hopes	1	–	-	1
29	David Hussey	1	-	-	1
48	Michael Hussey	1	-	3	4
5	Phil Jaques	-	–	3	3
25	Mitchell Johnson	1	–	3	4
13	Simon Katich	-	-	3	3
58	Brett Lee	1	-	3	4
45	Stuart MacGill	-	-	2	2
20	Shaun Marsh	1	-	-	1
14	Ricky Ponting	1	-	3	4
34	Luke Ronchi	1	-	-	1
63	Andrew Symonds	-	-	3	3
33	Shane Watson	1	-	-	1
9	Cameron White	1	-	-	1

Source: cricinfo.com

=== Batting ===
==== Twenty20 Internationals ====
The following is a table of statistics charting Australian batsmen in Twenty20 International cricket in the 2007–08 season. The minimum requirement for inclusion is one innings played. The players will be arranged by most runs scored.

Player	Mts	Inns	NO	BF	Runs	Avg	S/R	HS	50s	100s
Luke Ronchi	1	1	–	22	36	36.00	163.63	36	-	–
Shaun Marsh	1	1	–	22	29	29.00	131.81	29	-	–
Shane Watson	1	1	1	15	17	–	113.33	17*	-	–
Cameron White	1	1	1	6	10	–	166.66	10*	-	–
David Hussey	1	1	–	2	0	0.00	0.00	0	-	–

==== One Day Internationals ====
The following is a table of statistics charting Australian batsmen in One Day International cricket in the 2007–08 season. The minimum requirement for inclusion is one innings played. The players will be arranged by most runs scored.

Player	Mts	Inns	NO	BF	Runs	Avg	S/R	HS	50s	100s

==== Tests ====
The following is a table of statistics charting Australian batsmen in Test cricket in the 2008 season. The minimum requirement for inclusion is one innings played. The players will be arranged by most runs scored.

Player	Mts	Inns	NO	BF	Runs	Avg	S/R	HS	50s	100s
Ricky Ponting	3	6	-	495	323	53.83	65.25	158	1	1
Simon Katich	3	5	–	685	319	63.80	46.56	157	–	2
Andrew Symonds	3	6	2	398	264	66.00	66.33	79	3	–
Phil Jaques	3	6	–	470	245	40.83	52.12	108	1	1
Michael Clarke	2	4	1	321	168	56.00	52.33	110	–	1
Brad Haddin	3	6	1	327	151	30.20	46.17	45*	–	–
Michael Hussey	3	6	–	366	137	22.83	37.43	56	1	–
Brett Lee	3	5	2	178	103	34.33	57.86	63*	1	–
Brad Hodge	1	2	–	175	94	47.00	53.71	67	1	–
Mitchell Johnson	3	4	1	100	55	18.33	55.00	29*	–	–
Beau Casson	1	1	–	44	10	10.00	22.72	10	–	–
Stuart Clark	3	3	1	24	5	2.50	20.83	3	–	–
Stuart MacGill	2	2	–	13	2	1.00	15.38	2	–	–

Mts = Matches, Inns = Innings, NO = Not Outs, BF = Balls Faced, Avg = Batting Average, S/R = Batting Strike Rate, HS = Highest Score
Source: cricinfo.com

=== Bowling ===
==== Twenty20 Internationals ====
The following is a table of statistics charting Australian bowlers in Twenty20 International cricket in the 2008 season. The minimum requirement for inclusion is one ball bowled. The players will be arranged by most wickets taken.

Player	Mts	Wkts	Runs	Avg	S/R	Econ	BBI	BBM	Ovrs	5WI	10WM
Shane Watson	1	1	17	17.00	13.0	7.84	1/17	–	2.1	–	-
Cameron White	1	0	8	–	–	8.00	–	–	1.0	–	-
James Hopes	1	0	14	–	–	7.00	–	–	2.0	–	-
Brett Lee	1	0	26	–	–	13.00	-	–	2.0	–	-
Mitchell Johnson	1	0	30	–	–	15.00	–	–	2.0	–	-

==== One Day Internationals ====
The following is a table of statistics charting Australian bowlers in One Day International cricket in the 2008 season. The minimum requirement for inclusion is one ball bowled. The players will be arranged by most wickets taken.

Player	Mts	Wkts	Runs	Avg	S/R	Econ	BBI	BBM	Ovrs	5WI	10WM

==== Tests ====
The following is a table of statistics charting Australian bowlers in Test cricket in the 2008 season. The minimum requirement for inclusion is one ball bowled. The players will be arranged by most wickets taken.

Player	Mts	Wkts	Runs	Avg	S/R	Econ	BBI	BBM	Ovrs	5WI	10WM
Brett Lee	3	18	427	23.72	44.2	3.21	5/59	8/110	132.4	1	-
Stuart Clark	3	13	251	19.30	50.7	2.28	5/32	8/91	110.0	1	-
Mitchell Johnson	3	10	347	34.70	62.9	3.31	4/41	5/113	104.5	-	-
Stuart MacGill	2	5	325	65.00	91.2	4.27	2/43	4/143	76.0	-	-
Michael Clarke	2	4	77	19.25	40.0	1.92	2/20	2/36	40.0	-	-
Beau Casson	1	3	129	43.00	64.0	4.03	3/86	3/129	32.0	-	-
Andrew Symonds	3	1	73	73.00	216.0	2.02	1/17	1/23	36.0	-	-
Michael Hussey	2	0	14	–	–	2.33	–	–	6.0	-	-

Mts = Matches, Wkts = Wickets, Runs = Runs scored off bowler, Avg = Bowling Average, S/R = Bowling Strike Rate, BBI = Best Bowling Innings, Econ = Economy Rate, BBM = Best Bowling Match, Ovrs = Overs Bowled, 5WI = 5 Wickets Innings, 10WM = 10 Wickets Match
Source: cricinfo.com

=== Catches ===
The following is a table of statistics charting catches taken by Australian fieldsmen in the 2008 season. The minimum requirement for inclusion is one catch. The players will be arranged in alphabetical order.

Player	T20I	ODI	Test	Total
Beau Casson	-	-	2	2
Stuart Clark	-	-	1	1
Michael Clarke	-	-	2	2
Brad Haddin †	-	-	16	16
Michael Hussey	-	-	5	5
Phil Jaques	-	-	4	4
Mitchell Johnson	1	-	1	2
Simon Katich	-	-	3	3
Brett Lee	-	-	2	2
Ricky Ponting	-	-	1	1
Andrew Symonds	-	-	2	2

† Wicketkeeper
Source: cricinfo.com

== Important events ==
- On 22 May wicketkeeper Brad Haddin became the 400th man to represent Australia in Test match cricket.
- On 30 May Australian captain Ricky Ponting became the seventh man to reach 10,000 Test match runs.
- On 1 June leg-spinner Stuart MacGill announced his retirement from international cricket effective at the end of the Second Test in Antigua, ending his ten-year international career.
- On 27 June Australian captain Ricky Ponting became the second Australian to reach 300 One Day Internationals.
- On 29 June fast bowler Brett Lee reached 300 One Day International wickets, dismissing Darren Sammy caught and bowled. This made him the fastest to 300 wickets in One Day International history.
- All-rounder Andrew Symonds was axed from Australia's squad to play Bangladesh after missing a team meeting to go fishing.

== See also ==
- Australia national cricket team
- International cricket in 2008
