= Kensington Cricket Club =

Kensington Browns
- Full name: Kensington District Cricket Club
- Nickname: The Browns
- Sport: Cricket
- Founded: 1871
- First season: 1871/72
- League: South Australian Cricket Association
- Home ground: Parkinson Oval
- Colours: Brown, Gold
- Anthem: "Kensy Boys Are Happy"
- President: Tony Bedford
- Head coach: Russell Thompson
- Captain: Josh Doyle
- 2025/26: Division 1 T20 premieres
- Website: http://www.kensingtonbrowns.com

The Kensington District Cricket Club ("The Browns") is a semi-professional cricket club in Adelaide, South Australia. It competes in the South Australian Grade Cricket League, which is administered by the South Australian Cricket Association (SACA).

== Location ==
In 1963, the City of Burnside relocated the club from the Kensington Oval when ground was converted into an athletics stadium to the Kensington Gardens Reserve. The club has leases over the three cricket ovals, (Parkinson Oval, Ford Oval and Col. Waite Oval) in perpetuity as compensation for this relocation.

== Club history ==
Kensington has an extremely rich past player history, dominated by the presence of Sir Donald Bradman and Clarrie Grimmett who played for the club in the 1930s. Other famous names to play for Kensington include Sam Parkinson, Peter Brinsley, John Inverarity, Kevin Wright, Brian Hurn, Ian Glover, Neil Dansie, Rex Sellers, Bob Lloyd, Ashley Woodcock, Terry Jenner, Jeff Hammond, Howard Mutton, James Brayshaw, Tim May, Jamie Siddons, Mark Cleary, Greg Blewett, Dean Waugh, Cleve Hughes and Michael Klinger.

Kensington has won 16 A Grade premierships and has been runner up on 6 other occasions. The most recent A grade premiership was in the 2010/2011 season. The club also won the One Day premiership currently known as the XXXX Gold One Day Cup in 2005/06, 2006/07 and 2009/10. Kensington also celebrated its first Twenty20 premiership, winning the 2006/07 title.

Kensington were the second club behind Sturt Cricket Club to attempt to win all three A grade premierships in a season. Sturt was defeated by Kensington in the One Day final in 2005/06 and Kensington was defeated by West Torrens Cricket Club in the 2006/07 Grade Final after already claiming the One Day and Twenty20 Premierships. Kensington won the 2025/26 Kookaburra Twenty20 Cup over West Torrens at Adelaide Oval. Notable Adelaide Strikers players played in that final for Kensington like Lloyd Pope, Alex Ross and Henry Thornton.

== Teams ==
The club has four senior men's teams and three women's teams in the SACA Competition. The men's A, B, C and D grade sides compete in two day, one day and Twenty20 games. The club also has 4 junior teams, in under 14's and 16's. Players from these teams also play in the Ray Sutton Shield (primary school age), u12 statewide cup and u17 BankSA Shield carnivals. Kensington also has an under 11 and under 13 combined 'academy', who receive training and play internal matches, as well as unofficial matches against similar squads from other Grade clubs and college primary A sides, in the absence of a structured SACA under 13 competition.

Kensington also has a team in the Adelaide Turf Cricket Association Amateur Competition. Currently the team features past players that are no longer up to the rigours of semi-professional cricket. The team is in the Limited Overs A grade competition.

== 2008–2009 season ==
Kensington recruited Aaron O'Brien and Michael Klinger, two first-class interstate players that signed with the South Australian Redbacks. Kensington have four members in the Redbacks squad for the 2008/09 season, with Jake Brown and Mark Cleary also securing contracts. Former West Torrens, Redback and Australian representative Matthew Elliot also signed with the club after retiring from representative cricket last season.

Long time servant and playing member of the club, John Palmer Junior was appointed coach for 2008/09 season. Jake Brown captained the Browns, taking over from Dean Waugh.

Kensington played Glenelg Cricket Club at Adelaide Oval on 1 February 2009 in the XXXX Gold One Day Cup Final. Winning the toss, Kensington skipper Jake Brown elected to bat and were bowled out for 153 in the 48th over. Glenelg overhauled the score in the 41st over with the loss of only three wickets. Kensington have now appeared in five One Day Cup finals this decade with a 60% win rate.

The Kensington A grade side made it through to the XXXX Golden Grade Cup semi-finals after finishing third on the table in the regular season. Pitted against 2007/08 season's premiers Woodville Cricket Club. Club veteran Jamie Panelli took seven wickets to dismiss Woodville for 80. Woodville ended Kensington's season by then bowling the Browns out for 71.

== 2009–2010 season ==
Kensington maintained Jake Brown as the club captain and John Palmer Junior as coach. Brown lost his rookie contract with the Redbacks while Cleary, Klinger and O'Brien maintained their contracts. Sam McNeil was selected to represent the South Australia under 23s Futures Team. Tom Brinsley is in the Australian under 19 squad for 2009/10. It was also the 40th Anniversary of the Melbourne Cricket Club and Kensington Cricket Club association which sees an annual match between the two clubs, alternating venue each year.

Kensington won their third XXXX Gold One Day Cup for the decade, defeating Northern Districts at Adelaide Oval on 14 February 2010. Batting first, the Browns posted 193 set up by James Hilditch and Aaron O'Brien. The Jets were in early trouble at 5 for 23 and then 6 for 61 before a late order partnership pushed Northerns to 7 for 159 but eventually bowled out for 172 with lone hand of Steven Marks 78 not out the only real resistance. Mark Cleary and Elliot Opie took three wickets each in an all-round effort by the Browns.

Kensington finished ninth on the table in the 2009/10 season.

== 2010–2011 season ==
Kensington signed Rob Cassell after he was recruited by SACA for the state side. The Browns unable to defend their One Day title after being losing to Woodville in the semi-final. They did make the Two Day Grand Final after defeating Woodville in another low-scoring affair. Kensington then went on to defeat minor premiers Sturt at Adelaide Oval on 26 and 27 March 2011.

== 2015–2016 season ==
Kensington again was captained by Jake Brown and were coached by Ben Johnswood. The A Grade finished 4th and were knocked out in the semi-finals by Tea Tree Gully. It was a successful season with Alex Ross, Daniel Worrall and Elliot Opie all playing for the state side during the year.
