= List of 2020 Indian Premier League personnel changes =

2020 Indian Premier League Auction

General information
- Sport: Cricket
- Date: 19 December 2019
- Time: 3:30 PM IST
- Location: Kolkata
- Networks: Star Sports & Hotstar

Overview
- 62 Players (140.30 crores) total selections
- League: Indian Premier League
- Teams: 8

This is a list of all personnel changes for the 2020 Indian Premier League.

== Pre-auction ==
The BCCI set the deadline of 14 November for both the trading window and the list of each IPL team's retained and released players.

=== Transfers ===
Kings XI Punjab's skipper Ravichandran Ashwin for months was rumoured to be transferred to Delhi Capitals before eventually being transferred in November. Ajinkya Rahane, Trent Boult and Mayank Markande got salary raise during pre-auction trades.

Player	Nationality	Salary Before	From	To	Salary After	Date	Ref
Mayank Markande	India	₹20 lakh (US$21,000)	Mumbai Indians^{[↓]}	Delhi Capitals	₹2 crore (US$210,000)	31 July 2019	
Sherfane Rutherford	West Indies	₹2 crore (US$210,000)	Delhi Capitals^{[↑]}	Mumbai Indians	₹2 crore (US$210,000)	31 July 2019	
Ravichandran Ashwin	India	₹7.6 crore (US$790,000)	Kings XI Punjab^{[↓]}	Delhi Capitals	₹7.6 crore (US$790,000)	7 November 2019	
Jagadeesha Suchith^{[REP]}	India	₹20 lakh (US$21,000)	Delhi Capitals^{[↑]}	Kings XI Punjab	₹20 lakh (US$21,000)	7 November 2019	
Trent Boult	New Zealand	₹2.2 crore (US$230,000)	Delhi Capitals	Mumbai Indians	₹3.2 crore (US$330,000)	13 November 2019	
Krishnappa Gowtham	India	₹6.2 crore (US$640,000)	Rajasthan Royals^{[↓]}	Kings XI Punjab	₹6.2 crore (US$640,000)	13 November 2019	
Ankit Rajpoot	India	₹3 crore (US$310,000)	Kings XI Punjab^{[↑]}	Rajasthan Royals	₹3 crore (US$310,000)	13 November 2019	
Dhawal Kulkarni	India	₹75 lakh (US$78,000)	Rajasthan Royals	Mumbai Indians	₹75 lakh (US$78,000)	13 November 2019	
Ajinkya Rahane	India	₹4 crore (US$420,000)	Rajasthan Royals^{[↓]}	Delhi Capitals	₹5.25 crore (US$550,000)	14 November 2019	
Mayank Markande (Note: Mayank Markande was traded twice before season, to and from Delhi, without playing for the team.)	India	₹2 crore (US$210,000)	Delhi Capitals^{[↑]}	Rajasthan Royals	₹2 crore (US$210,000)	14 November 2019	
Rahul Tewatia	India	₹3 crore (US$310,000)	Delhi Capitals^{[↑]}	Rajasthan Royals	₹3 crore (US$310,000)	14 November 2019	
Siddhesh Lad	India	₹20 lakh (US$21,000)	Mumbai Indians	Kolkata Knight Riders	₹20 lakh (US$21,000)	15 November 2019	

^{↓} ↓: Player(s) was/were swapped with the player(s) mentioned in the next row(s).
^{↑} ↑: Player(s) was/were swapped with the player(s) mentioned in the previous row(s).
^{REP} REP: Players who were unsold originally in the 2019 auction but were later signed up as a replacement player.

=== Released players ===
The released players were announced on 15 November 2019. Robin Uthappa, Yuvraj Singh and Chris Lynn were the prominent names among the released players. Jaydev Unadkat, the costliest Indian player in 2019 auction, was also released.

Player	Nationality	Salary	Ref
Chennai Super Kings
Mohit Sharma	India	₹5 crore (US$519,212.50)	
David Willey	England	₹2 crore (US$207,685.00)	
Sam Billings	England	₹1 crore (US$103,842.50)	
Chaitanya Bishnoi	India	₹20 lakh (US$20,768.50)	
Dhruv Shorey	India	₹20 lakh (US$20,768.50)	
Scott Kuggeleijn^{[REP]}	New Zealand		
Delhi Capitals
Chris Morris	South Africa	₹7.1 crore (US$737,281.80) (Note: Morris was retained at a salary of ₹7.1 crore (US$1.0 million) but as per the IPL rules, the actual purse deduction for the Delhi team was ₹11 crore (US$1.6 million).)	
Colin Ingram	South Africa	₹6.4 crore (US$664,592.00)	
Hanuma Vihari	India	₹2 crore (US$207,685.00)	
Colin Munro	New Zealand	₹1.9 crore (US$197,300.80)	
Ankush Bains	India	₹20 lakh (US$20,768.50)	
Bandaru Ayyappa	India	₹20 lakh (US$20,768.50)	
Jalaj Saxena	India	₹20 lakh (US$20,768.50)	
Manjot Kalra	India	₹20 lakh (US$20,768.50)	
Nathu Singh	India	₹20 lakh (US$20,768.50)	
Kings XI Punjab
Varun Chakravarthy	India	₹8.4 crore (US$872,277.00)	
Andrew Tye	Australia	₹7.2 crore (US$747,666.00)	
Sam Curran	England	₹7.2 crore (US$747,666.00)	
Prabhsimran Singh	India	₹4.8 crore (US$498,444.00)	
David Miller	South Africa	₹3 crore (US$311,527.50)	
Moises Henriques	Australia	₹1 crore (US$103,842.50)	
Agnivesh Ayachi	India	₹20 lakh (US$20,768.50)	
Kolkata Knight Riders
Chris Lynn	Australia	₹9.6 crore (US$996,888.00)	
Carlos Brathwaite	West Indies	₹5 crore (US$519,212.50)	
Joe Denly	England	₹1 crore (US$103,842.50)	
Anrich Nortje	South Africa	₹20 lakh (US$20,768.50)	
K C Cariappa^{[REP]}	India	₹20 lakh (US$20,768.50)	
Nikhil Naik	India	₹20 lakh (US$20,768.50)	
Prithvi Raj Yarra	India	₹20 lakh (US$20,768.50)	
Shrikant Mundhe	India	₹20 lakh (US$20,768.50)	
Matthew Kelly^{[REP]}	Australia		

Player	Nationality	Salary	Ref
Mumbai Indians
Evin Lewis	West Indies	₹3.8 crore (US$394,601.50)	
Barinder Sran	India	₹3.4 crore (US$353,064.50)	
Ben Cutting	Australia	₹2.2 crore (US$228,453.50)	
Jason Behrendorff	Australia	₹1.5 crore (US$155,763.80)	
Yuvraj Singh	India	₹1 crore (US$103,842.50)	
Adam Milne	New Zealand	₹75 lakh (US$77,881.90)	
Pankaj Jaiswal	India	₹20 lakh (US$20,768.50)	
Rasikh Salam (Note: In June 2019, BCCI banned Salam for two years following a discrepancy with his birth certificate.)	India	₹20 lakh (US$20,768.50)	
Alzarri Joseph^{[REP]}	West Indies		
Beuran Hendricks^{[REP]}	South Africa		
Rajasthan Royals
Jaydev Unadkat	India	₹8.4 crore (US$872,277.00)	
Rahul Tripathi	India	₹3.4 crore (US$353,064.50)	
Oshane Thomas	West Indies	₹1.1 crore (US$114,226.80)	
Ashton Turner	Australia	₹50 lakh (US$51,921.30)}	
Ish Sodhi	New Zealand	₹50 lakh (US$51,921.30)	
Liam Livingstone	England	₹50 lakh (US$51,921.30)	
Stuart Binny	India	₹50 lakh (US$51,921.30)	
Aryaman Birla	India	₹30 lakh (US$31,152.80)	
Prashant Chopra	India	₹20 lakh (US$20,768.50)	
Shubham Ranjane	India	₹20 lakh (US$20,768.50)	
Sudhesan Midhun	India	₹20 lakh (US$20,768.50)	
Royal Challengers Bangalore
Marcus Stoinis	Australia	₹6.2 crore (US$643,823.50)	
Shimron Hetmyer	West Indies	₹4.2 crore (US$436,138.50)	
Akshdeep Nath	India	₹3.6 crore (US$373,833.00)	
Colin de Grandhomme	New Zealand	₹2.2 crore (US$228,453.50)	
Nathan Coulter-Nile	Australia	₹2.2 crore (US$228,453.50)	
Prayas Ray Barman	India	₹1.5 crore (US$155,763.80)	
Tim Southee	New Zealand	₹1 crore (US$103,842.50)	
Kulwant Khejroliya	India	₹85 lakh (US$88,266.10)	
Himmat Singh	India	₹65 lakh (US$67,497.60)	
Heinrich Klaasen	South Africa	₹50 lakh (US$51,921.30)	
Milind Kumar	India	₹20 lakh (US$20,768.50)	
Dale Steyn^{[REP]}	South Africa		
Sunrisers Hyderabad
Deepak Hooda	India	₹3.6 crore (US$373,833.00)	
Shakib Al Hasan (Note: In October 2019, ICC banned Shakib for one year after breaching the ICC's Anti-Corruption Code.)	Bangladesh	₹2 crore (US$207,685.00)	
Yusuf Pathan	India	₹1.9 crore (US$197,300.80)	
Martin Guptill	New Zealand	₹1 crore (US$103,842.50)	
Ricky Bhui	India	₹20 lakh (US$20,768.50)	

^{REP} REP: Players who were unsold originally in the 2019 auction but were later signed up as a replacement player.

=== Retained players ===
The team retentions were announced on 15 November 2019.

Player	Nationality	Salary
Chennai Super Kings
MS Dhoni	India	₹15 crore (US$1.6 million)
Suresh Raina	India	₹11 crore (US$1.1 million)
Kedar Jadhav	India	₹7.8 crore (US$809,971.50)
Ravindra Jadeja	India	₹7 crore (US$726,897.50)
Dwayne Bravo	Trinidad and Tobago	₹6.4 crore (US$664,592.00)
Karn Sharma	India	₹5 crore (US$519,212.50)
Shane Watson	Australia	₹4 crore (US$415,370.00)
Shardul Thakur	India	₹2.6 crore (US$269,990.50)
Ambati Rayudu	India	₹2.2 crore (US$228,453.50)
Harbhajan Singh	India	₹2 crore (US$207,685.00)
Murali Vijay	India	₹2 crore (US$207,685.00)
Faf du Plessis	South Africa	₹1.6 crore (US$166,148.00)
Imran Tahir	South Africa	₹1 crore (US$103,842.50)
Deepak Chahar	India	₹80 lakh (US$83,074.00)
Lungisani Ngidi	South Africa	₹50 lakh (US$51,921.30)
Mitchell Santner	New Zealand	₹50 lakh (US$51,921.30)
KM Asif	India	₹40 lakh (US$41,537.00)
Jagadeesan Narayan	India	₹20 lakh (US$20,768.50)
Monu Singh	India	₹20 lakh (US$20,768.50)
Ruturaj Gaikwad	India	₹20 lakh (US$20,768.50)
Delhi Capitals
Rishabh Pant	India	₹8 crore (US$830,740.00) (Note: Pant was retained at a salary of ₹8 crore (US$830,740.00) but as per the IPL rules, the actual purse deduction for the Delhi team was ₹15 crore (US$1.6 million).)
Shreyas Iyer	India	₹7 crore (US$726,897.50)
Shikhar Dhawan	India	₹5.2 crore (US$539,981.00)
Axar Patel	India	₹5 crore (US$519,212.50)
Kagiso Rabada	South Africa	₹4.2 crore (US$436,138.50)
Amit Mishra	India	₹4 crore (US$415,370.00)
Prithvi Shaw	India	₹1.2 crore (US$124,611.00)
Ishant Sharma	India	₹1.1 crore (US$114,226.80)
Avesh Khan	India	₹70 lakh (US$72,689.80)
Keemo Paul	Guyana	₹50 lakh (US$51,921.30)
Harshal Patel	India	₹20 lakh (US$20,768.50)
Sandeep Lamichhane	Nepal	₹20 lakh (US$20,768.50)
Kings XI Punjab
KL Rahul	India	₹11 crore (US$1.1 million)
Karun Nair	India	₹5.6 crore (US$581,518.00)
Mohammad Shami	India	₹4.8 crore (US$498,444.00)
Nicholas Pooran	Trinidad and Tobago	₹4.2 crore (US$436,138.50)
Mujeeb Ur Rahman	Afghanistan	₹4 crore (US$415,370.00)
Chris Gayle	Jamaica	₹2 crore (US$207,685.00)
Mandeep Singh	India	₹1.4 crore (US$145,379.50)
Mayank Agarwal	India	₹1 crore (US$103,842.50)
Hardus Viljoen	South Africa	₹75 lakh (US$77,881.90)
Darshan Nalkande	India	₹30 lakh (US$31,152.80)
Sarfaraz Khan	India	₹25 lakh (US$25,960.60)
Arshdeep Singh	India	₹20 lakh (US$20,768.50)
Harpreet Brar	India	₹20 lakh (US$20,768.50)
Murugan Ashwin	India	₹20 lakh (US$20,768.50)
Kolkata Knight Riders
Sunil Narine	Trinidad and Tobago	₹8.5 crore (US$882,661.30) (Note: Narine was retained at a salary of ₹8.5 crore (US$882,661.30) but as per the IPL rules, the actual purse deduction for the Kolkata team was ₹12.5 crore (US$1.3 million).)
Andre Russell	Jamaica	₹7 crore (US$726,897.50) (Note: Russell was retained at a salary of ₹7 crore (US$726,897.50) but as per the IPL rules, the actual purse deduction for the Kolkata team was ₹8.5 crore (US$882,661.30).)
Dinesh Karthik	India	₹7.4 crore (US$768,434.50)
Kuldeep Yadav	India	₹5.8 crore (US$602,286.50)
Nitish Rana	India	₹3.4 crore (US$353,064.50)
Kamlesh Nagarkoti	India	₹3.2 crore (US$332,296.00)
Shivam Mavi	India	₹3 crore (US$311,527.50)
Shubman Gill	India	₹1.8 crore (US$186,916.50)
Lockie Ferguson	New Zealand	₹1.6 crore (US$166,148.00)
Rinku Singh	India	₹80 lakh (US$83,074.00)
Harry Gurney	England	₹75 lakh (US$77,881.90)
Prasidh Krishna	India	₹20 lakh (US$20,768.50)
Sandeep Warrier^{[REP]}	India	₹20 lakh (US$20,768.50)

Player	Nationality	Salary
Mumbai Indians
Rohit Sharma	India	₹15 crore (US$1.6 million)
Hardik Pandya	India	₹11 crore (US$1.1 million)
Krunal Pandya	India	₹8.8 crore (US$913,814.00)
Jasprit Bumrah	India	₹7 crore (US$726,897.50)
Ishan Kishan	India	₹6.2 crore (US$643,823.50)
Kieron Pollard	Trinidad and Tobago	₹5.4 crore (US$560,749.50)
Suryakumar Yadav	India	₹3.2 crore (US$332,296.00)
Quinton de Kock	South Africa	₹2.8 crore (US$290,759.00)
Lasith Malinga	Sri Lanka	₹2 crore (US$207,685.00)
Rahul Chahar	India	₹1.9 crore (US$197,300.80)
Mitchell McClenaghan	New Zealand	₹1 crore (US$103,842.50)
Anmolpreet Singh	India	₹80 lakh (US$83,074.00)
Jayant Yadav	India	₹50 lakh (US$51,921.30)
Aditya Tare	India	₹20 lakh (US$20,768.50)
Anukul Roy	India	₹20 lakh (US$20,768.50)
Rajasthan Royals
Ben Stokes	England	₹12.5 crore (US$1.3 million)
Steve Smith	Australia	₹12 crore (US$1.2 million) (Note: Smith was retained at a salary of ₹12 crore (US$1.2 million) but as per the IPL rules, the actual purse deduction for the Rajasthan team was ₹12.5 crore (US$1.3 million).)
Sanju Samson	India	₹8 crore (US$830,740.00)
Jofra Archer	England	₹7.2 crore (US$747,666.00)
Jos Buttler	England	₹4.4 crore (US$456,907.00)
Varun Aaron	India	₹2.4 crore (US$249,222.00)
Shashank Singh	India	₹30 lakh (US$31,152.80)
Mahipal Lomror	India	₹20 lakh (US$20,768.50)
Manan Vohra	India	₹20 lakh (US$20,768.50)
Riyan Parag	India	₹20 lakh (US$20,768.50)
Shreyas Gopal	India	₹20 lakh (US$20,768.50)
Royal Challengers Bangalore
Virat Kohli	India	₹17 crore (US$1.8 million)
AB de Villiers	South Africa	₹11 crore (US$1.1 million)
Yuzvendra Chahal	India	₹6 crore (US$623,055.00)
Shivam Dube	India	₹5 crore (US$519,212.50)
Umesh Yadav	India	₹4.2 crore (US$436,138.50)
Washington Sundar	India	₹3.2 crore (US$332,296.00)
Navdeep Saini	India	₹3 crore (US$311,527.50)
Mohammed Siraj	India	₹2.6 crore (US$269,990.50)
Moeen Ali	England	₹1.7 crore (US$176,532.30)
Parthiv Patel	India	₹1.7 crore (US$176,532.30)
Pawan Negi	India	₹1 crore (US$103,842.50)
Gurkeerat Singh	India	₹50 lakh (US$51,921.30)
Devdutt Padikkal	India	₹20 lakh (US$20,768.50)
Sunrisers Hyderabad
David Warner	Australia	₹12 crore (US$1.2 million) (Note: Warner was retained at a salary of ₹12 crore (US$1.2 million) but as per IPL rules, the actual purse deduction for the Hyderabad team was ₹12.5 crore (US$1.3 million).)
Manish Pandey	India	₹11 crore (US$1.1 million)
Rashid Khan	Afghanistan	₹9 crore (US$934,582.50)
Bhuvneshwar Kumar	India	₹8.5 crore (US$882,661.30)
Siddarth Kaul	India	₹3.8 crore (US$394,601.50)
Shahbaz Nadeem	India	₹3.2 crore (US$332,296.00)
Vijay Shankar	India	₹3.2 crore (US$332,296.00)
Kane Williamson	New Zealand	₹3 crore (US$311,527.50)
Khaleel Ahmed	India	₹3 crore (US$311,527.50)
Sandeep Sharma	India	₹3 crore (US$311,527.50)
Jonny Bairstow	England	₹2.2 crore (US$228,453.50)
Wriddhiman Saha	India	₹1.2 crore (US$124,611.00)
Mohammad Nabi	Afghanistan	₹1 crore (US$103,842.50)
Shreevats Goswami	India	₹1 crore (US$103,842.50)
Basil Thampi	India	₹95 lakh (US$98,650.40)
Abhishek Sharma	India	₹55 lakh (US$57,113.40)
Billy Stanlake	Australia	₹50 lakh (US$51,921.30)
Thangarasu Natarajan	India	₹50 lakh (US$51,921.30)

^{REP} REP: Players who were unsold originally in the 2019 auction but were later signed up as a replacement player.

=== Summary ===
Pre-Auction summary
Team	Retained		Transfers In		Released		Transfers Out		Funds Remaining	Player Slots Remaining (Max)	
Team	Players	Amount	Players	Amount	Players	Amount	Players	Amount	Funds Remaining	Overall	Overseas
Chennai	20	₹70.4 crore (US$7.3 million)	0	—	6	₹8.4 crore (US$872,277.00)	0	—	₹14.6 crore (US$1.5 million)	5	2
Delhi	12	₹44.3 crore (US$4.6 million)	3	₹14.85 crore (US$1.5 million)	9	₹20.3 crore (US$2.1 million)	4	₹9.2 crore (US$955,351.00)	₹27.85 crore (US$2.9 million)	11	5
Punjab	14	₹35.9 crore (US$3.7 million)	2	₹6.4 crore (US$664,592.00)	7	₹31.8 crore (US$3.3 million)	2	₹10.6 crore (US$1.1 million)	₹42.7 crore (US$4.4 million)	9	4
Kolkata	13	₹49.15 crore (US$5.1 million)	1	₹0.2 crore (US$20,768.50)	11	₹27 crore (US$2.8 million)	0	—	₹35.65 crore (US$3.7 million)	11	4
Mumbai	15	₹66 crore (US$6.9 million)	3	₹5.95 crore (US$617,862.90)	10	₹13.05 crore (US$1.4 million)	2	₹0.4 crore (US$41,537.00)	₹11.15 crore (US$1.2 million)	7	2
Rajasthan	11	₹48.1 crore (US$5.0 million)	3	₹8 crore (US$830,740.00)	11	₹15.8 crore (US$1.6 million)	3	₹10.95 crore (US$1.1 million)	₹28.9 crore (US$3.0 million)	11	4
Bangalore	13	₹57.1 crore (US$5.9 million)	0	—	9	₹18.75 crore (US$1.9 million)	0	—	₹27.9 crore (US$2.9 million)	12	6
Hyderabad	18	₹68 crore (US$7.1 million)	0	—	5	₹8.7 crore (US$903,429.80)	0	—	₹17 crore (US$1.8 million)	7	2
Maximum overseas players: 8; Squad size- Min:18 and Max:25; Budget:₹85 Crore

== Auction ==
The auction was conducted on 19 December 2019 in Kolkata. The teams will have an additional purse balance of Rs.3 crores in addition to balance remaining of their original Rs. 85 crores. A total of 971 players including 258 overseas players have registered for the 2019 IPL Auctions, wheres a maximum of 73 positions are to be filled. Later, the Governing Council sent the eight franchises the final list of players, which has been trimmed from the original 971 to 332, including 19 Indian capped players. The final list also includes 24 new players that were added after those names were requested by the franchises.

Team summary
Team	Funds Remaining (₹ in Crores)	In Auction			Overall (including Retained)		
Team	Funds Remaining (₹ in Crores)	Uncapped Players	Capped Players	Total Players	Uncapped Players	Overseas Players	Total Players
Chennai	0.15	1	3	4	5	8	24
Delhi	9.00	2	6	8	4	8	22
Punjab	16.50	5	4	9	12	8	25
Kolkata	8.50	6	3	9	13	8	23
Mumbai	1.95	3	3	6	8	8	24
Rajasthan	14.75	5	6	11	12	8	25
Bangalore	6.40	3	5	8	4	8	21
Hyderabad	10.10	5	2	7	9	8	25
Maximum overseas players: 8; Squad size- Min:18 and Max:25; Budget:₹85 Crore

=== Sold players ===
S.No	Set No	Set	Name	Country	Playing Role	IPL Matches	Capped / Uncapped / Associate	Reserve Price (in ₹ Lacs)	IPL 2020 Team	Auctioned Price (in ₹ Lacs)	IPL 2019 Team	IPL Team(s)
1	1	BA1	Chris Lynn	Australia	Batsman	41	Capped	200	Mumbai Indians	200	KKR	DCH, SRH, KKR
2	1	BA1	Eoin Morgan	England	Batsman	52	Capped	200	Kolkata Knight Riders	525		RCB, KKR, SRH, KXIP
3	1	BA1	Robin Uthappa	India	Batsman	177	Capped	150	Rajasthan Royals	300	KKR	MI, RCB, PWI, KKR
4	1	BA1	Jason Roy	England	Batsman	8	Capped	150	Delhi Capitals	150		GL, DD
5	1	BA1	Aaron Finch	Australia	Batsman	75	Capped	100	Royal Challengers Bangalore	440		RR, DD, PWI, SRH, MI, GL, KXIP
6	2	AL1	Glenn Maxwell	Australia	All Rounder	69	Capped	200	Kings XI Punjab	1075		MI, KXIP, DD
7	2	AL1	Chris Woakes	England	All Rounder	18	Capped	150	Delhi Capitals	150		KKR, RCB
8	2	AL1	Pat Cummins	Australia	All Rounder	16	Capped	200	Kolkata Knight Riders	1550		MI, KKR, DD
9	2	AL1	Sam Curran	England	All Rounder	16	Capped	100	Chennai Super Kings	550	KXIP	KXIP
10	2	AL1	Chris Morris	South Africa	All Rounder	61	Capped	150	Royal Challengers Bangalore	1000	DC	CSK, RR, DC
11	3	WK1	Alex Carey	Australia	Wicket Keeper		Capped	50	Delhi Capitals	240		
12	4	FA1	Jaydev Unadkat	India	Fast Bowler	73	Capped	100	Rajasthan Royals	300	RR	KKR, RCB, DD, RPS, RR
13	4	FA1	Nathan Coulter-Nile	Australia	All-rounder	26	Capped	100	Mumbai Indians	800	RCB	MI, DD, KKR, RCB
14	4	FA1	Sheldon Cottrell	Jamaica	Fast Bowler		Capped	50	Kings XI Punjab	850		
15	5	SP1	Piyush Chawla	India	Spinner	157	Capped	100	Chennai Super Kings	675	KKR	KXIP, KKR
16	6	UBA1	Rahul Tripathi	India	Batsman	34	Uncapped	20	Kolkata Knight Riders	60	RR	RPS, RR
17	6	UBA1	Virat Singh	India	Batsman		Uncapped	20	Sunrisers Hyderabad	190		
18	5	UBA1	Priyam Garg	India	Batsman		Uncapped	20	Sunrisers Hyderabad	190		
19	7	UAL1	Deepak Hooda	India	All Rounder	61	Uncapped	40	Kings XI Punjab	50	SRH	RR, SRH
20	7	UAL1	Varun Chakravarthy	India	All Rounder	1	Uncapped	30	Kolkata Knight Riders	400	KXIP	KXIP
21	7	UAL1	Yashasvi Jaiswal	India	All Rounder		Uncapped	20	Rajasthan Royals	240		
22	8	UWK1	Anuj Rawat	India	Wicket Keeper		Uncapped	20	Rajasthan Royals	80		
23	8	UFA1	Akash Singh	India	Fast Bowler		Uncapped	20	Rajasthan Royals	20		
24	9	UFA1	Kartik Tyagi	India	Fast Bowler		Uncapped	20	Rajasthan Royals	130		
25	9	UFA1	Ishan Porel	India	Fast Bowler		Uncapped	20	Kings XI Punjab	20		
26	10	USP1	M Siddharth	India	Spinner		Uncapped	20	Kolkata Knight Riders	20		
27	10	USP1	Ravi Bishnoi	India	Spinner		Uncapped	20	Kings XI Punjab	200		
28	11	BA2	Shimron Hetmyer	Guyana	Batsman	5	Capped	50	Delhi Capitals	775	RCB	RCB
29	11	BA2	David Miller	South Africa	Batsman	79	Capped	75	Rajasthan Royals	75	KXIP	KXIP
30	11	BA2	Saurabh Tiwary	India	Batsman	81	Capped	50	Mumbai Indians	50		RCB, DD, RPS, MI
31	12	AL2	Mitchell Marsh	Australia	All-Rounder	20	Capped	200	Sunrisers Hyderabad	200		DCH, PWI, RPS
32	12	AL2	James Neesham	New Zealand	All-Rounder	4	Capped	50	Kings XI Punjab	50		DD, KKR
33	13	FA2	Josh Hazlewood	Australia	Fast Bowler	0	Capped	200	Chennai Super Kings	200		MI
34	15	UAL2	Bavanaka Sandeep	India	All-Rounder		Uncapped	20	Sunrisers Hyderabad	20		
35	15	UAL2	Chris Green	Australia	All-Rounder		Uncapped	20	Kolkata Knight Riders	20		
36	16	UWK2	Josh Philippe	Australia	Wicket Keeper	0	Uncapped	20	Royal Challengers Bangalore	20		
37	17	UFA2	Mohsin Khan	India	Fast Bowler	0	Uncapped	20	Mumbai Indians	20		MI
38	19	BA3	Tom Banton	England	Batsman		Uncapped	100	Kolkata Knight Riders	100		
39	20	AL3	Fabian Allen	Jamaica	All-Rounder		Capped	50	Sunrisers Hyderabad	50		
40	20	AL3	Chris Jordan	England	All-Rounder	11	Capped	75	Kings XI Punjab	300		RCB, SRH
41	22	FA3	Kane Richardson	Australia	Fast Bowler	14	Capped	150	Royal Challengers Bangalore	400		PWI, RR, RCB
42	22	FA3	Oshane Thomas	Jamaica	Fast Bowler	4	Capped	50	Rajasthan Royals	50	RR	RR
43	28	USP3	Pravin Tambe	India	Spinner	33	Capped	20	Kolkata Knight Riders	20		RR, GL, SRH
44	33	UAL4	Tajinder Singh Dhillon	India	All-Rounder	0	Uncapped	20	Kings XI Punjab	20		MI
45	33	UAL4	Abdul Samad	India	All-Rounder		Uncapped	20	Sunrisers Hyderabad	20		
46	42	UAL6	Aniruddha Joshi	India	All-Rounder	0	Uncapped	20	Rajasthan Royals	20		RCB
47	43	AL7	Digvijay Deshmukh	India	All-Rounder		Uncapped	20	Mumbai Indians	20		
48	43	AL7	Prince Balwant Rai	India	All-Rounder		Uncapped	20	Mumbai Indians	20		
49	^{[ADD]}		Sanjay Yadav	India	All-Rounder	0	Uncapped	20	Sunrisers Hyderabad	20		KKR
50	^{[REC]}		Mohit Sharma	India	Bowler	85	Capped	50	Delhi Capitals	50	CSK	CSK, KXIP
51	^{[REC]}		Pavan Deshpande	India	All-Rounder	0	Uncapped	20	Royal Challengers Bangalore	20		RCB
52	^{[REC]}		Prabhsimran Singh	India	Wicket-Keeper	1	Uncapped	20	Kings XI Punjab	55	KXIP	KXIP
53	^{[REC]}		Tushar Deshpande	India	Bowler		Uncapped	20	Delhi Capitals	20		
54	^{[REC]}		R Sai Kishore	India	Bowler		Uncapped	20	Chennai Super Kings	20		
55	^{[REC]}		Marcus Stoinis	Australia	All-Rounder	29	Capped	100	Delhi Capitals	480	RCB	RCB, KXIP, DD
56	^{[REC]}		Dale Steyn	South Africa	Bowler	92	Capped	200	Royal Challengers Bangalore	200	RCB	RCB, DCH, GL, SRH
57	^{[REC]}		Andrew Tye	Australia	Bowler		Capped	100	Rajasthan Royals	100	KXIP	CSK, GL, KXIP
58	^{[REC]}		Lalit Yadav	India	All-Rounder		Uncapped	20	Delhi Capitals	20		
59	^{[REC]}		Shahbaz Ahmed	India	Wicket-Keeper		Uncapped	20	Royal Challengers Bangalore	20		
60	^{[REC]}		Nikhil Naik	India	Wicket-Keeper	3	Uncapped	20	Kolkata Knight Riders	20	KKR	KKR, KXIP
61	^{[REC]}		Tom Curran	England	All-Rounder	5	Capped	100	Rajasthan Royals	100		KKR
62	^{[REC]}		Isuru Udana	Sri Lanka	All-Rounder		Capped	50	Royal Challengers Bangalore	50		

^{ADD} ADD: Players who were not part of Original List But Added Into accelerated bidding.
^{ACC} ACC: Players who were part of accelerated bidding.
^{REC} REC-1/2/3: Players unsold originally but brought back for Recall Round-1, 2 or 3.
^{DI-REC} DI-REC-2/3: Players not called in accelerated process but were brought back for Recall Round-2 or 3.
* : Players were in the squad for the season but did not play any match.
0 : Players mentioned as 0 in IPL matches column were part of the squad but did not play any matches.

== Withdrawn players ==
The following players withdrew from the tournament either due to injuries or because of other reasons.

Player	Team	Auctioned/Retention Price	Reason	Withdrawal Announcement date	Replacement Player	Replacement Player's Price	Replacement Player's Base Price	Signing date	Ref		
Chris Woakes	Delhi Capitals	₹1.5 crore (US$155,763.80)	International Commitment	6 March 2020	Anrich Nortje		₹50 lakh (US$51,921.30)	18 August 2020			
Harry Gurney	Kolkata Knight Riders	₹75 lakh (US$77,881.90)	Shoulder Injury	26 August 2020	Ali Khan		₹20 lakh (US$20,768.50)	12 September 2020			
Jason Roy	Delhi Capitals	₹1.5 crore (US$155,763.80)	Side Strain	27 August 2020	Daniel Sams		₹20 lakh (US$20,768.50)	27 August 2020			
Suresh Raina	Chennai Super Kings	₹11 crore (US$1.1 million)	Personal Reasons	29 August 2020	[[ national cricket team|]]						
Kane Richardson	Royal Challengers Bangalore	₹4.0 crore (US$415,370.00)	Personal Reasons	31 August 2020	Adam Zampa		₹1.5 crore (US$155,763.80)	31 August 2020			
Lasith Malinga	Mumbai Indians	₹2.0 crore (US$207,685.00)	Personal Reasons	2 September 2020	James Pattinson		₹1 crore (US$103,842.50)	2 September 2020			
Harbhajan Singh	Chennai Super Kings	₹2 crore (US$207,685.00)	Personal Reasons	4 September 2020	{{country data {{{1}}}	flag link/core	variant =	size =	name =	altlink = national cricket team	altvar = cricket }}
Pravin Tambe	Kolkata Knight Riders	₹20 lakh (US$20,768.50)	Ineligible due to playing in foreign cricket leagues	4 September 2020	{{country data {{{1}}}	flag link/core	variant =	size =	name =	altlink = national cricket team	altvar = cricket }}
Mitchell Marsh	Sunrisers Hyderabad	₹2 crore (US$210,000)	Ankle Injury	23 September 2020	Jason Holder		₹75 lakh (US$77,881.90)	23 September 2020			
Amit Mishra	Delhi Capitals	₹4 crore (US$420,000)	Finger Injury	5 October 2020	Praveen Dubey		₹20 lakh (US$20,768.50)	19 October 2020			
Bhuvneshwar Kumar	Sunrisers Hyderabad	₹8.5 crore (US$880,000)	Thigh Injury	5 October 2020	Prithvi Raj Yarra		₹20 lakh (US$20,768.50)	5 October 2020			
Ali Khan	Kolkata Knight Riders	₹20 lakh (US$20,768.50)	Side Strain	7 October 2020	Tim Seifert			19 October 2020			
Ishant Sharma	Delhi Capitals	₹1.1 crore (US$114,226.80)	Rib Injury	12 October 2020	[[ national cricket team|]]						
Dwayne Bravo	Chennai Super Kings	₹6.4 crore (US$664,592.00)	Groin Injury	21 October 2020	[[ national cricket team|]]						

== Support staff changes ==
Staff	Team	Change	Role	Announcement date	Note	Ref
Jacques Kallis	Kolkata Knight Riders	Parted Ways	Head coach	14 July 2019	Replaced by Brendon McCullum	
Simon Katich	Kolkata Knight Riders	Parted Ways	Assistant coach	14 July 2019	Moved to Royal Challengers Bangalore replaced by Abhishek Nayar	
Tom Moody	Sunrisers Hyderabad	Parted Ways	Head coach	19 July 2019	Replaced by Trevor Bayliss	
Trevor Bayliss	Sunrisers Hyderabad	Appointed	Head coach	19 July 2019	Replaced Tom Moody	
Andrew Leipus	Kolkata Knight Riders	Resigned	Physio	19 July 2019	Replaced by Kamlesh Jain	
Patrick Farhart	Delhi Capitals	Appointed	Head physio	2 August 2019	Replaced Sumeshen Moodley	
Mike Hesson	Kings XI Punjab	Parted Ways	Head coach	8 August 2019	Replaced by Anil Kumble	
Sridharan Sriram	Kings XI Punjab	Parted ways	Bowling coach	23 August 2019	Moved to Royal Challengers Bangalore	
Ryan Harris	Kings XI Punjab	Parted ways	Bowling coach	23 August 2019	Replaced by Courtney Walsh	
Craig McMillan	Kings XI Punjab	Parted ways	Fielding coach	23 August 2019	Replaced by Jonty Rhodes	
Brendon McCullum	Kolkata Knight Riders	Appointed	Head coach	15 August 2019	Replaced Jacques Kallis	
Simon Helmot	Sunrisers Hyderabad	Replaced	Assistant coach	19 August 2019	Replaced by Brad Haddin	
Brad Haddin	Sunrisers Hyderabad	Appointed	Assistant coach	19 August 2019	Replaced Simon Helmot	
Gary Kirsten	Royal Challengers Bangalore	Parted Ways	Head coach	23 August 2019	Replaced by Simon Katich	
Ashish Nehra	Royal Challengers Bangalore	Parted Ways	Bowling Coach	23 August 2019	Replaced by Adam Griffith	
Mike Hesson	Royal Challengers Bangalore	Appointed	Director of cricket operations	23 August 2019	Moved from KXIP	
Simon Katich	Royal Challengers Bangalore	Appointed	Head coach	23 August 2019	Replaced Gary Kirsten and Moved from KKR	
Adam Griffith	Royal Challengers Bangalore	Appointed	Bowling Coach	19 September 2019	Replaced Ashish Nehra	
Sridharan Sriram	Royal Challengers Bangalore	Appointed	Batting and Spin Bowling Coach	19 September 2019	Moved from Kings XI Punjab	
Basu Shanker	Royal Challengers Bangalore	Appointed	Strength and conditioning Coach	19 September 2019		
Soumyadeep Pyne	Royal Challengers Bangalore	Appointed	Team Manager	19 September 2019		
Malolan Rangarajan	Royal Challengers Bangalore	Appointed	Head of Scouting	19 September 2019		
Evan Speechly	Royal Challengers Bangalore	Appointed	Physio	19 September 2019		
Abhishek Nayar	Kolkata Knight Riders	promoted as assistant coach	Mentor	5 October 2019	Replaced by David Hussey	
Omkar Salvi	Kolkata Knight Riders	Removed	Bowling Coach	5 October 2019	Replaced by Kyle Mills	
David Hussey	Kolkata Knight Riders	Appointed	Chief Mentor	5 October 2019	Replaced Abhishek Nayar	
Kyle Mills	Kolkata Knight Riders	Appointed	Bowling Coach	5 October 2019	Replaced Omkar Salvi	
Anil Kumble	Kings XI Punjab	Appointed	Head coach and Director of Cricket Operations	11 October 2019	Replaced Mike Hesson for role of Head Coach	
Jonty Rhodes	Kings XI Punjab	Appointed	Fielding Coach	11 October 2019	Replaced Craig McMillan	
Sourav Ganguly	Delhi Capitals	Parted ways	Advisor	15 October 2019	Became president of BCCI	
Navnita Gautam	Royal Challengers Bangalore	Appointed	Massage therapist	17 October 2019	Replaced Ramesh Mane	
Paddy Upton	Rajasthan Royals	Parted ways	Head coach	21 October 2019	Replaced by Andrew McDonald	
Andrew McDonald	Rajasthan Royals	Appointed	Head coach	21 October 2019	Replaced Paddy Upton	
Pravin Amre	Delhi Capitals	Parted Ways	Talent Scout	21 October 2019	Replaced by Vijay Dahiya	
Vijay Dahiya	Delhi Capitals	Appointed	Head talent scout	21 October 2019	Replaced Pravin Amre	
Andy Flower	Kings XI Punjab	Appointed	Assistant Coach	19 December 2019		
Wasim Jaffer	Kings XI Punjab	Appointed	Batting Coach	19 December 2019	Replaced Sridharan Sriram	
Pravin Amre	Mumbai Indians	Appointed	Talent Scout	19 December 2019		
Ish Sodhi	Rajasthan Royals	Appointed	Spin Consultant and operations executive	2 January 2020		
Steffan Jones	Rajasthan Royals	parted ways	Fast bowling coach	20 January 2020	Replaced by Rob Cassell	
Rob Cassell	Rajasthan Royals	Appointed	Fast bowling coach	23 January 2020	Replaced Steffan Jones	
James Foster	Kolkata Knight Riders	Appointed	Fielding coach	9 February 2020	Replaced Subhadeep Ghosh	
Ryan Harris	Delhi Capitals	Appointed	Fast bowling Coach	25 August 2020	Replace James Hopes	
Pravin Tambe	Kolkata Knight Riders	Appointed	Spin Consultant and operations executive	13 September 2020	Replaced Carl Crowe	
