= 2002–03 Sheffield Shield season =

Australian cricket tournament

- Cricket format: First-class
- Tournament format(s): Double round-robin & Final
- Champions: New South Wales (43rd title)
- Participants: 6
- Matches: 31
- Player of the series: Clinton Perren (Queensland)
- Most runs: Greg Blewett (South Australia) (843)
- Most wickets: Stuart MacGill (New South Wales) (48)

The 2002–03 Sheffield Shield season known as the Pura Cup was the 101st season of the Sheffield Shield, the domestic first-class cricket competition of Australia. New South Wales won the championship.

== Table ==
Team	Played	Won	Lost	Tied	Drawn	N/R	Points
Queensland	10	6	3	0	1	0	42
New South Wales	10	6	2	0	2	0	36
Victoria	10	5	4	0	5	0	36
South Australia	10	4	5	0	1	0	28
Western Australia	10	2	5	0	3	0	20
Tasmania	10	2	6	0	2	0	14

== Final ==
14–16 March 2003
Scorecard

New South Wales	v	Queensland (H)
282 (80.2 overs); Michael Slater 100 (197); Joe Dawes 5/66 (21 overs)		84 (29.2 overs); Wade Seccombe 24* (39); Stuart MacGill 5/16 (5.2 overs)
263 (80.2 overs); Steve Waugh 56 (132); Joe Dawes 3/64 (17 overs)		215 (65 overs); Lee Carseldine 65 (146); Simon Katich 3/43 (14 overs)

New South Wales won by 246 runs
Venue: The Gabba, Brisbane
Umpires: Peter Parker and Steve Davis
Player of the match: Simon Katich (New South Wales)

- Queensland won the toss and elected to field.

== Statistics ==
=== Most runs ===
Player	Team	Mat	Inns	NO	Runs	Ave	HS	100	50
Greg Blewett	South Australia	9	17	0	843	49.58	135	2	5
David Fitzgerald	South Australia	10	19	1	774	43	153	3	1
Michael Slater	New South Wales	10	18	0	770	42.77	204	3	1
Michael Clarke	New South Wales	10	17	1	763	47.68	134	4	2
Chris Rogers	Western Australia	10	17	1	745	45.56	194	2	4

=== Most wickets ===
Player	Team	Mat	Inns	Overs	Wkts	Ave	Econ	BBI	BBM	5	10
Stuart MacGill	New South Wales	10	18	387.3	48	26.83	3.32	5/16	9/128	3	0
Michael Kasprowicz	Queensland	10	18	394.3	47	23.02	2.74	5/36	7/98	3	0
Joe Dawes	Queensland	10	18	296.2	43	18.76	2.72	7/67	10/135	3	1
Michael Clark	Western Australia	10	18	287.0	38	23.13	3.06	5/47	6/102	1	0
Ashley Noffke	Queensland	8	14	274.4	37	21.48	2.89	6/24	8/160	2	0
