= Jake Brown (cricketer) =

Australian cricketer (born 1985)

Personal information
- Full name: Jake Michael Brown
- Born: 21 November 1985 (age 40)
- Batting: Right-handed
- Bowling: Left-arm fast-medium
- Role: Batsman

Domestic team information
- Years: Team
- 2007/08–2012/13: South Australia

Career statistics
Competition	FC	LA	T20
Matches	5	1	1
Runs scored	213	–	18
Batting average	21.30	–	–
100s/50s	0/2	–	0/0
Top score	65	–	18*
Balls bowled	36	18	–
Wickets	1	1	–
Bowling average	20.00	15.00	–
5 wickets in innings	0	0	–
10 wickets in match	0	0	–
Best bowling	1/2	1/15	–
Catches/stumpings	3/–	1/–	1/–
- Source: Cricinfo, 22 August 2019

Jake Michael Brown (born 21 November 1985) is a former Australian cricketer.

Brown is a right-handed batsman and a left-arm fast-medium bowler who played five first-class, one List A and one T20 matches for South Australia between 2008 and 2013. Playing for Kensington, he has won the Bradman Medal for the best player in the Adelaide first-grade competition three times: in 2013–14, 2014–15 and 2018–19.
