= Andy Delmont =

Australian cricketer

Personal information
- Full name: Andrew Hartley Delmont
- Born: 16 December 1985 (age 40); Burnside, South Australia, Australia
- Batting: Right-handed
- Bowling: Left-arm fast-medium
- Role: Batsman

Domestic team information
- Years: Team
- 2007/08: South Australia
- First-class debut: 29 October 2007 South Australia v Tasmania
- Last First-class: 29 February 2008 South Australia v Queensland
- List A debut: 19 October 2007 South Australia v Victoria
- Last List A: 7 November 2007 South Australia v New South Wales

Career statistics
| Competition | First-class | List A |
|---|---|---|
| Matches | 6 | 3 |
| Runs scored | 247 | 55 |
| Batting average | 22.45 | 27.50 |
| 100s/50s | 0/2 | 0/0 |
| Top score | 64 | 32 |
| Balls bowled | 0 | 0 |
| Wickets | – | – |
| Bowling average | – | – |
| 5 wickets in innings | – | – |
| 10 wickets in match | – | – |
| Best bowling | – | – |
| Catches/stumpings | 1/0 | 0/0 |
- Source: CricketArchive, 13 October 2011

Andrew Hartley Delmont (born 16 December 1985 in Adelaide, South Australia) is a professional Australian cricketer who played for South Australia. A right-handed batsman, Delmont was rewarded by South Australia with a rookie contract for the 2007–08 season after playing grade cricket for Adelaide University. Del made three first class 100s.

He made his List A debut against Victoria on 19 October 2007. Delmont's first ball was a hat-trick ball by Shane Harwood, yet he successfully defended it and was eventually dismissed for 13. Less than two weeks later, he made his first-class debut against Tasmania at Bellerive Oval. He impressed, scoring 56 in the second innings.

== See also ==
- List of South Australian representative cricketers
