= Rob Cassell =

Australian cricketer (born 1983)

Robert James Cassell (born 28 April 1983 in Melbourne, Australia) is an Australian cricketer and international coach who played first-class cricket for the Victorian Bushrangers and South Australian Redbacks and also represented Australia in the 2002 Under-19 Cricket World Cup in New Zealand.

== Playing career ==
=== Victoria Bushrangers ===
Cassell is a Fast Medium bowler with a number of first class and one day appearances to his name. At 188 cm, he was considered a genuine future prospect for Victoria from an early age.

Cassell was a highly touted youngster for the Victorian Bushrangers taking 4–33 in his first-class debut in 2002 against the Queensland Bulls. But injuries limited him to just a handful of First-Class and One-Day games. Cassell's performances in those early matches for the Bushrangers suggested potential, with 7 wickets (at an average of 22.71) in the Pura Cup and 4 wickets in the ING Cup at 22.50. Cassell played much of his early state cricket in the 2002–2003 season.

Despite the Bushrangers baring through injury setbacks, 2006/07 proved a challenging season for Cassell. When frontline bowlers Shane Harwood, Allan Wise and Gerard Denton all found themselves injured throughout the season, but Cassell remained injured himself, it left the opportunity to Clinton McKay, Darren Pattinson and Grant Lindsay to make the step up to the state side. McKay and Pattison were both offered contracts in the place of Cassell due to injury and Brad Knowles.

Cassell went through a period of two years where he couldn't play due to injury, spending time to recover physically and mentally to have another run at first-class cricket. Cassell went overseas believing he would never play cricket again but the urge returned when he found himself watching a Test on TV in a bar in Barcelona in 2008.

In 2009 Cassell returned to cricket after remodelling his action (due to his legacy injuries) at the Centre of Excellence in Brisbane and played Premier Cricket for the Melbourne Cricket Club. He broke back into the Victorian team in late 2009 a successful return to first-class cricket in Australia.

=== South Australia Redbacks ===
In 2010 after a successful return to playing, Cassell made the tough decision to leave his home state Victoria, and move to South Australia to take up an offer with the South Australia Redbacks where he believed his bowling opportunities would be greater. This proved to be a smart decision with a number of outstanding performances with the Redbacks including a huge 6-53 off 16.1 overs in November 2010 against Queensland in a Sheffield Shield match.

Cassell went on to successfully play for the Redbacks during the 2010 and 2011 seasons until his genetic back injuries cut his bowling career short again.

== Coaching career ==
=== South Australia Redbacks ===
Cassell took up a position with the Redbacks as a bowling coach helping the development of their upcoming talent. Cassell continued to coach with South Australia until 2017. Over the five years as a coach in South Australia, Cassell has helped leg-spinner Adam Zampa become a regular for Australia's ODI and T20 sides, and has also worked closely with Joe Mennie who made his Test debut last season. Cassell quietly forged a reputation as a bowling guru in his time at the Adelaide Oval five years ago under former Redbacks head coach Darren Berry. Cassell helped transform interstate 'cast-offs' including Mennie and Daniel Worrall, while bringing the best out of homegrown favourites Chadd Sayers and Kane Richardson.

=== Ireland National Cricket Team ===
In 2017 Cassell left South Australia to take up an opportunity as Assistant Head Coach and National Fast Bowling Coach with the Ireland cricket team working under head coach Graham Ford. Ireland were in the process of admission to full International Cricket Council (ICC) status which was successfully granted.

== IPL ==
He was appointed as bowling coach for Rajasthan Royals
