= Peter Brinsley =

Australian cricketer

Personal information
- Full name: Peter F Brinsley
- Role: All-rounder

Domestic team information
- Years: Team
- 1983/84-1984/85: South Australia

Career statistics
Competition	List A
Matches	5
Runs scored	49
Batting average	16.33
100s/50s	–/-
Top score	38
Balls bowled	234
Wickets	6
Bowling average	24.33
5 wickets in innings	–
10 wickets in match	–
Best bowling	4/45
Catches/stumpings	-/-
- Source: Cricinfo, 18 May 2018

Peter Brinsley is an Australian cricketer. He played five List A matches for South Australia between 1983 and 1985.

Brinsley's son Tom represented the Australian Under 19 and the South Australian Under 23 sides.

== See also ==
- List of South Australian representative cricketers
