= Matthew Nicholson (cricketer) =

Australian cricketer (born 1974)

Personal information
- Full name: Matthew James Nicholson
- Born: 2 October 1974 (age 52); St Leonards, New South Wales, Australia
- Batting: Right-handed
- Bowling: Right-arm fast-medium
- Role: All rounder

International information
- National side: Australia
- Only Test (cap 380): 26 December 1998 v England

Career statistics
Competition	Test	FC	LA	T20
Matches	1	124	79	24
Runs scored	14	3,258	485	76
Batting average	7.00	23.78	15.15	15.20
100s/50s	0/0	4/6	0/1	0/0
Top score	9	133	57*	20*
Balls bowled	150	23,366	3,530	457
Wickets	4	406	85	28
Bowling average	28.75	29.91	36.74	21.71
5 wickets in innings	0	11	0	0
10 wickets in match	0	0	0	0
Best bowling	3/56	7/62	3/23	3/12
Catches/stumpings	0/–	70/–	19/–	5/–
- Source: Cricinfo, 8 December 2025

Matthew James Nicholson (born 2 October 1974) is an Australian former cricketer who played in one Test match in 1998 and over 100 first-class games for New South Wales, Western Australia, Northamptonshire and Surrey.

A native of the Sydney suburb of St Leonards, he attended Knox Grammar School and began playing for the Gordon club in the Sydney competition who he later captained. His career was ravaged by injuries as well as chronic fatigue syndrome, following a dose of glandular fever but a strict diet enabled him to manage the problem, and he became a vital part of WA's and New South Wales' bowling line-ups. In 1998 Nicholson earned a surprise call up to play his one and only Test against England in Melbourne.

In 2004/05 Nicholson claimed 47 wickets in the Pura Cup, including 7 in the final, as NSW won the title. In 2007 he played for Surrey having previously played County Cricket with Northamptonshire in 2006. He was released by Surrey after an illness blighted and unsuccessful 2008 to allow Shoaib Akhtar in for 2 games.

He announced his retirement in March 2008 with NSW's game against South Australia being his last. Following his retirement, Nicholson was appointed as a selector for the New South Wales team. He later spent several years as the Director of Cricket at Newington College.

Nicholson was named as the fast-bowling coach for the NSW Blues' Academy in 2025.

== See also ==
- One Test Wonder
