= Mark Cameron (cricketer) =

Australian former cricketer

Personal information
- Full name: Mark Alan Cameron
- Born: 31 January 1981 (age 45); Waratah, New South Wales, Australia
- Batting: Right-handed
- Bowling: Right-arm fast
- Role: Bowler

Domestic team information
- Years: Team
- 2002/03–2010/11: New South Wales (squad no. 30)

Career statistics
Competition	FC	LA	T20
Matches	16	12	6
Runs scored	83	16	15
Batting average	7.54	8.00	–
100s/50s	0/0	0/0	0/0
Top score	18	6*	14*
Balls bowled	3.070	600	144
Wickets	68	15	5
Bowling average	24.63	34.86	38.00
5 wickets in innings	5	0	0
10 wickets in match	2	0	0
Best bowling	6/22	3/25	2/45
Catches/stumpings	4/–	1/–	2/–
- Source: Cricinfo, 23 April 2023

Mark Alan Cameron (born 31 January 1981) is an Australian former cricketer who played Australian domestic cricket for New South Wales.

Cameron was a right-handed batsman and a right-arm fast bowler. He was drafted into the squad for the Australia A tour of India in September 2008. He later left New South Wales to play for Western Australia and the Perth Scorchers, but retired without playing a game for either team due to injury.
