= Allan Wise =

Australian cricketer (born 1979)

Allan Wise (born 24 February 1979 in Melbourne, Victoria) is an Australian cricketer who previously played first-class cricket with the Victorian Bushrangers.

Debuting in the 2003–04 season with Victoria, Wise had a solid start to his career and was initially the second choice left-arm paceman behind Matthew Inness. When Inness was dumped for the Pura Cup final that season and was subsequently not given selection for the following season, his transfer to Western Australia saw Wise take over as the number one left-armer.
