= Beau Casson =

Australian cricketer (born 1982)

Personal information
- Full name: Beau Casson
- Born: 7 December 1982 (age 43); Subiaco, Western Australia, Australia
- Nickname: Buzz
- Height: 1.78 m (5 ft 10 in)
- Batting: Right-handed
- Bowling: Left-arm unorthodox spin
- Role: All rounder

International information
- National side: Australia
- Only Test (cap 401): 12 June 2008 v West Indies

Domestic team information
- Years: Team
- 2002/03–2005/06: Western Australia
- 2006/07–2011/12: New South Wales

Career statistics
Competition	Test	FC	LA	T20
Matches	1	50	21	5
Runs scored	10	1,483	47	–
Batting average	10.00	22.81	7.83	–
100s/50s	0/0	0/8	0/0	–
Top score	10	99	18	–
Balls bowled	192	8,594	624	78
Wickets	3	117	18	1
Bowling average	43.00	43.52	28.66	115.00
5 wickets in innings	0	4	0	0
10 wickets in match	0	1	0	0
Best bowling	3/86	6/64	4/31	1/20
Catches/stumpings	2/–	22/–	3/–	1/–
- Source: CricketArchive, 10 May 2022

Beau Casson (born 7 December 1982) is an Australian former professional cricketer who is the current senior coach of Western Australia. Casson played for Western Australia and New South Wales from 2002 to 2011, and represented Australia at Test cricket. Primarily a left-arm wrist spinner, Casson was also capable with the bat and had a highest first-class score of 99. He retired from first-class cricket in 2011.

== Early and personal life ==
Casson was born and grew up in the Perth suburb of Subiaco as one of seven children. He began bowling wrist-spin as a child after watching Shane Warne, citing him as a major influence in his career. Casson was born with Tetralogy of Fallot, a congenital heart defect for which he has undergone three open-heart surgeries.

Casson is married to Sally.

== Junior career ==
A talented junior cricketer, Casson represented the Australian U-19 cricket team in Youth Test and One Day International matches between 2001 and 2002. He was a vital part of the Australian Under 19 team that won the 2002 Under 19 Cricket World Cup in New Zealand, taking 12 wickets at 15.08 in 6 matches. He was also a part of the Youth Test team that took on the Sri Lankan U-19 cricket team at Perth and Adelaide in 2001. Australia swept the series 3-0 and Casson performed solidly taking 8 wickets at 17.37 with best figures of 5/52.

Casson represented Western Australia at all junior levels, from playing in their Under 17 team in 1999 to their Under 19 team in 2001. He was also a multiple graduate of the Australian Cricket Academy, being a part of the academy intake in 2001, 2002 and 2006.

== Domestic career ==
=== Western Australia ===
As a junior, Casson competed for the Western Australian Under 17 and 19 teams as well as their Second XI team, however it wasn't until the 2002–03 season when he won his first full state contract. Prior to making his first-class debut, Casson also played for a Western Australian XI that took on the travelling English cricket team, taking the wicket of James Foster and finishing with figures of 1/32. With seven of Western Australia's players away on international duties, Casson made his first-class debut on 8 December 2003 against Tasmania at the WACA Ground. He had a quiet debut with the ball, taking 0/44 in Tasmania's first innings, but had a solid showing with the bat, scoring 35 runs in Western Australia's second innings. He had an excellent second first-class match as he tore through South Australia's batting line-up in the first innings to finish with 6/64 and went on to take 10 wickets for the match and was named Man of the Match for the first time in his senior career. Casson played the remaining games of the Pura Cup for Western Australia, however he faded with the ball towards the end of the season, finishing with 17 wickets at 39.35. The 2002–03 season also saw Casson make his List A debut on 10 January 2003 against Victoria at the Melbourne Cricket Ground. He failed to take a wicket on debut, and in the three other matches he played in the ING Cup season.

Casson had a solid second season for Western Australia, taking 17 wickets at 34.11 in the Pura Cup and 4 wickets at 33.50 in the ING Cup, however he missed part of the season due to strained ligaments in his bowling hand. After recovering from his hand injury, Casson had mixed fortunes in the 2004-05 Australian season. He struggled with the ball and bat in the 2004-05 Pura Cup, taking 9 wickets at an average of 40.33 and scoring 36 runs at an average of 9.00. In contrast, he performed well with the ball in the ING Cup taking 8 wickets at 17.75. The 2005–06 season was Casson's last for Western Australia, and he performed poorly, managing 17 wickets at the hefty average of 54.29 in the Pura Cup and only 3 wickets at 41.33 in the ING Cup.

In his four years with the Warriors, Casson took 71 first-class wickets at 39.38 and 15 List A wickets at 30.20.

=== New South Wales ===
In May 2006, Casson announced he was making a move east to play for the New South Wales Blues. Although Western Australia tried to keep him, Casson felt that bowling on the more spin-friendly pitches of the Sydney Cricket Ground would help his career. Western Australia claimed that New South Wales had breached the transfer laws in signing him. Cricket Australia, however, ruled that his transfer was lawful and Casson was cleared to play for New South Wales.

While there were doubts over whether Casson would be able to hold down a permanent place in the New South Wales team with four other spinners in the squad, he managed to play seven matches in his first season with the Blues. Despite this, he had a very poor first season, taking only 7 wickets at an average of 72.00, however his form was not helped by a shoulder injury that eventually required reconstructive surgery. Coming back from shoulder injury, Casson had an excellent 2007-08 Pura Cup season. Playing nine matches in the season, he took 29 wickets at an average of 35.13 and scored 485 runs at 60.62. He hit a career top score of 99 off 180 balls against South Australia at the Sydney Cricket Ground and he played a vital role in the Blues' 2007-08 Pura Cup final win. After scoring 89 in a state record seventh wicket stand with Brett Lee, he took 4 wickets in Victoria's unsuccessful run chase, including the final wicket that won the Cup for New South Wales. His strong season was rewarded with his first Cricket Australia contract on 9 April 2008.

Despite performing well in first-class cricket, Casson struggled to make the New South Wales one-day team with Nathan Hauritz being the first choice List A spinner for the Blues. Casson only played one List A game and two Twenty20 for New South Wales.

He announced his retirement from all cricket in November 2011 due to his long-standing heart condition.

== International career ==
On 1 April 2008, Casson was named in Australia's squad for the tour of the West Indies as a back-up for Stuart MacGill. After the retirement of MacGill following the Second Test in Antigua, Casson was named in the Australian team for the final Test in Barbados. His Test debut came on 12 June 2008 at Kensington Oval, Bridgetown, making him the 401st man to play Test cricket for Australia. Despite going wicket-less in his first innings of the match, he picked up vital wickets in the final innings, taking 3/86. His first Test wicket was that of Xavier Marshall, caught at short leg by Phil Jaques for 85.

== Coaching career ==
Following his early retirement, Casson became a coach, spending 5 years as an assistant coach with New South Wales, before 7 years as an assistant coach to Adam Voges with Western Australia. Following Voges decision to resign from his position with Western Australia and focus on coaching the Perth Scorchers, Casson was appointed Western Australia's senior coach for the 2026-27 season.
