= Mark Cleary (cricketer) =

Australian cricketer

Mark Francis Cleary (born 19 July 1980 in Moorabbin, Victoria, Australia) is an Australian first-class cricketer, who played for the Victorian Bushrangers. He is a bowling all-rounder, who is a left-handed lower order batsman, and right-arm fast-medium bowler. Cleary has played cricket in England for Leicestershire and Yorkshire (2005). Since 2006, Cleary has spent his winters as a professional player-coach for Excelsior'20 C.C. in Schiedam, Netherlands. In the South Australia District Competition, Cleary played for Kensington Cricket Club, after being introduced to the club through the former state captain Jamie Siddons.

Cleary had an immediate impact on the Australia cricket scene, he was selected to play for Australia A in just his second first-class season. He picked up 30 Pura Cup wickets in 2003–04. He suffered a back injury in 2004–05, and nominated himself for the state transfer pool without success. In the limited overs format, he had a good season in 2005-06 when his side made the final, taking an equal competition best tally of sixteen wickets. In the same season, he scored his maiden first-class century, with an innings of 109 from 104 balls, against Tasmania.

He was part of Leicestershire's Twenty20 winning team. He also played in the Netherlands for Excelsior in 2009. Cleary moved to the Victorian Bushrangers for the 2010/2011 season.

== See also ==
- List of South Australian representative cricketers
