= Joe Dawes =

Australian cricketer (born 1970)

Personal information
- Full name: Joseph Henry Dawes
- Born: 29 August 1970 (age 56); Herston, Brisbane, Queensland
- Batting: Right-handed
- Bowling: Right-arm fast-medium
- Role: Bowler

Domestic team information
- Years: Team
- 1997/98–2005/06: Queensland
- 2003: Middlesex

Head coaching information
- Years: Team
- 2018–2021: Papua New Guinea

Career statistics
Competition	FC	LA	T20
Matches	76	27	1
Runs scored	616	6	0
Batting average	10.62	2.00	0.00
100s/50s	0/0	0/0	0/0
Top score	34*	2	0
Balls bowled	14,836	1,212	18
Wickets	285	24	0
Bowling average	25.38	41.04	–
5 wickets in innings	11	0	–
10 wickets in match	2	0	–
Best bowling	7/67	3/26	–
Catches/stumpings	12/–	6/–	0/–
- Source: Cricinfo, 1 June 2020

Joseph Henry Dawes (born 29 August 1970) is an Australian cricket coach and former player. He played for the Queensland Bulls in Australian domestic cricket as a right-arm fast bowler.

== Playing career ==
Dawes spent much of his early career in and out of the side due to the success of Michael Kasprowicz, Andy Bichel and Adam Dale. In 2001–02 he enjoyed his first full season when Kasprowicz got injured and Bichel returned to the Test side. He cemented his spot in the side and was a regular until a career ending knee injury in 2005. He finished as Queensland's eighth-highest wicket-taker of all time with 238 victims at 24.94 from his 64 matches.

His best season with the Bulls came in 2001–02 with 49 wickets, topping the Pura Cup wicket tally. 43 and 46 wickets came in his next few seasons as he helped Queensland to claim back-to-back titles.

He has also played cricket at Middlesex and for the Marylebone Cricket Club.

== Post-playing career ==
In February 2012 he was appointed as the bowling coach of the India national cricket team. He replaced Eric Simons.

In March 2018, Dawes was appointed the head coach of the Papua New Guinea national cricket team. He vacated the role in March 2021.

In May 2021 Dawes joined the staff of then-Defence Minister Peter Dutton.

In October 2023 Dawes returned to Queensland Cricket to work as General Manager – Elite Teams, Performance, and Pathways.

== Usman Khawaja controversy ==
In March 2025, Usman Khawaja missed a crucial Sheffield Shield game and instead attended the Australian Grand Prix in Melbourne. Dawes criticised Khawaja publicly saying "It’s just disappointing he didn’t play a game for Queensland when he had an opportunity to. I have got a bunch of blokes here that all want to play." Khawaja responded angrily to Dawes' statement, saying he was managing an injury and calling some of Dawes' statements "categorically untrue."
