= Mathew Inness =

Australian cricketer (born 1978)

Mathew William Hunter Inness (born 13 January 1978) is a former first-class cricketer, representing Australian domestic teams Victoria and Western Australia, and English county side, Northamptonshire.

Born in East Melbourne, Victoria, Inness made his first-class debut for Victoria in the 1997/98 season, earning the nickname "Min".

A right-handed lower-order batsman and left-arm fast medium bowler, Inness could move the ball both ways in the air and could get cut off the seam.

Inness had a series of injuries throughout his career, keeping him on the fringe of his state teams. During the 2003/04 season Inness contracted a bout of glandular fever, putting him out of action for the rest of the season.

Inness transferred to Western Australia to continue his career and played in three one day matches and fourteen Pura Cup matches for Western Australia. He retired at the end of the 2007–08 season to become a conditioning coach for the Warriors.

Inness is currently the Head of High Performance and Medical for Australian Football League (AFL) club Essendon having previously held similar roles at West Coast and Western Bulldogs.

== See also ==
- List of Victoria first-class cricketers
