= Shane Harwood =

Australian cricketer

Personal information
- Full name: Shane Michael Harwood
- Born: 1 March 1974 (age 52); Ballarat, Victoria, Australia
- Nickname: Stickers
- Height: 1.83 m (6 ft 0 in)
- Batting: Right-handed
- Bowling: Right arm fast-medium
- Role: Bowler

International information
- National side: Australia (2007-2009)
- Only ODI (cap 174): 13 April 2009 v South Africa
- T20I debut (cap 20): 9 January 2006 v South Africa
- Last T20I: 29 March 2009 v South Africa

Domestic team information
- Years: Team
- 2001/02–2010/11: Victoria (squad no. 2)
- 2009: Rajasthan Royals
- 2011/12: Melbourne Renegades
- 2012: Barisal Burners

Career statistics
Competition	ODI	T20I	FC	LA
Matches	1	3	44	57
Runs scored	0	0	666	191
Batting average	0.00	–	14.47	10.61
100s/50s	0/0	0/0	0/1	0/1
Top score	0	0*	68*	50*
Balls bowled	60	72	8,761	2,918
Wickets	2	3	137	91
Bowling average	28.50	37.66	32.75	24.01
5 wickets in innings	0	0	4	4
10 wickets in match	0	0	0	0
Best bowling	2/57	2/21	6/38	6/46
Catches/stumpings	0/–	0/–	11/–	8/–
- Source: CricketArchive, 18 December 2020

Shane Michael Harwood (born 1 March 1974) is an Australian former international cricketer who played for the Victoria cricket team. He played in one One Day International and three Twenty20 International matches.

== Early life ==
Harwood grew up in Ballarat, Victoria playing both indoor and outdoor cricket until a back injury kept him out of the game for two years. Upon his return, he won the Ballarat Cricket Association's best player medal in a premiership season with his club Brown Hill.

Moving to Melbourne, he was recruited by the Melbourne Cricket Club (MCC) ahead of the 1999–20 season. He would start with the MCC's second XI, quickly progressing to the first XI where he took 46 wickets for the season.

== Domestic career ==
Harwood began his Sheffield Shield career as a 28-year-old playing for Victoria in 2002–03 and became the third Australian to get a hat-trick on debut. Harwood took the wickets of Tasmanian batters Shane Watson and Graeme Cunningham, before bowling Sean Clingeleffer to complete the hat-trick. Interviewed by the media, Victorian teammate Shane Warne drove past in his Ferrari, tooting his horn and revving the engine, shouting out "next Australian quick."

Harwood was also a useful tailender who in the ING Cup once scored a 31-ball 50.

On 16 January 2006 Harwood took career-best figures of 6/38 in a Pura Cup match against New South Wales. In 2006–07, he claimed 26 first class wickets at 30.26 and 13 wickets at 16.30 in the domestic one-dayers as his sharp pace and awkward bounce dried up the opposition's runs.

Harwood's career was limited by injuries, including a broken leg, a broken eye socket and depressed cheekbone, a broken hand, hamstring problems, and a shoulder reconstruction.

He was also selected for Rajasthan Royals team in the Indian Premier League and he made his IPL debut on 2 May 2009 where he took a wicket of the first ball he bowled for the Rajasthan Royals. In the final year of his domestic career in 2012, he had T20 stints with Melbourne Renegades and Barisal Burners. Harwood would eventually return to his home town club of Brown Hill and in his last season at 43-years-old would score 553 runs and claim 31 wickets.

== International career ==
Harwood represented Australia A and was suggested by teammate Shane Warne as being a contender for the 2006 Australian Test tour of South Africa. Although he did not make the Test squad, he was a surprise selection for Australia in a Twenty20 International game against England in early 2007, taking the wicket of Andrew Flintoff in a spell of 1/44.

He was named in the Australian 30-man preliminary squad for the 2007 World Cup, but did not make the final squad.

On 12 March 2009, Harwood was selected for the 16-man Australian one-day squad in South Africa. He played both Twenty20 Internationals, taking 2/21 in the second match off his four overs. He made his One Day International debut for Australia against South Africa on 13 April 2009, with bowling figures of 2/57 from his ten overs, taking the wickets of Jacques Kallis and JP Duminy.
