= Simon Katich =

Australian cricketer

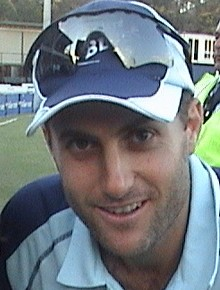

Personal information
- Full name: Simon Matthew Katich
- Born: 21 August 1975 (age 51); Middle Swan, Western Australia, Australia
- Nickname: Kat
- Height: 182 cm (6 ft 0 in)
- Batting: Left-handed
- Bowling: Slow left-arm wrist spin
- Role: Batsman

International information
- National side: Australia (2001–2010)
- Test debut (cap 384): 16 August 2001 v England
- Last Test: 3 December 2010 v England
- ODI debut (cap 143): 21 January 2001 v Zimbabwe
- Last ODI: 24 September 2006 v West Indies
- T20I debut (cap 6): 17 February 2005 v New Zealand
- Last T20I: 24 February 2006 v South Africa

Domestic team information
- Years: Team
- 1995/96–2001/02, 2013/14: Western Australia
- 2000: Durham
- 2002: Yorkshire
- 2002/03–2011/12: New South Wales
- 2003–2005, 2012: Hampshire
- 2007: Derbyshire
- 2008–2009: Kings XI Punjab
- 2010–2011, 2013: Lancashire
- 2011/12–2013/14: Perth Scorchers
- 2012/13: Duronto Rajshahi

Career statistics
Competition	Test	ODI	FC	LA
Matches	56	45	266	253
Runs scored	4,188	1,324	20,926	7,550
Batting average	45.03	35.78	52.84	35.78
100s/50s	10/25	1/9	58/111	7/60
Top score	157	107*	306	136*
Balls bowled	1,039	–	6,429	938
Wickets	21	–	107	25
Bowling average	30.23	–	35.30	34.72
5 wickets in innings	1	–	3	0
10 wickets in match	0	–	0	0
Best bowling	6/65	–	7/130	3/21
Catches/stumpings	39/–	13/–	227/–	115/–
- Source: CricketArchive, 12 May 2019

Simon Matthew Katich (born 21 August 1975) is an Australian cricket coach and former cricketer. He captained New South Wales and also, until the end of the 2007 season, Derbyshire County Cricket Club. Katich also played for Lancashire, represented his birth state of Western Australia and played in the Indian Premier League for Kings XI Punjab. Katich was also a member of the Australian team that won the 2006 ICC Champions Trophy.

He played primarily as a left-handed opening batsman and part-time left-arm unorthodox spin bowler. He played 56 Test matches for Australia from 2001 to 2011. On 12 June 2012 Katich retired from first-class cricket in Australia, but returned to play for Western Australia in 2013. In August 2019, Katich was appointed as the head coach for Royal Challengers Bangalore, and was present at the 2020 IPL Player Auction in Kolkata in December 2019.

He is also a commentator for SEN Radio and the Seven Network.

== Early career ==
Katich was an AIS Australian Cricket Academy scholarship holder in 1996. and made his debut for the Western Australia state team in the 1996–97 season. The following season he was a central figure in Western Australia's Sheffield Shield success, scoring an impressive 1,039 first-class runs for the season.

== International selection ==
He was selected to tour Sri Lanka with the national team the following season but suffered greatly from illness, including a debilitating bout of chicken pox.

He recovered to contribute further for his state, highlighted in the 2000–01 domestic season where he helped himself to 1,282 first-class runs. He later switched from Western Australia to New South Wales where he currently lives.

Katich made his Test debut in the fourth Test of the 2001 Ashes tour of England. He failed to capitalize making only 15 and was not out 0. In only his second match he bowled for the first time in Test cricket, and in the second innings took 6/65 against Zimbabwe at the Sydney Cricket Ground.

Following Steve Waugh's retirement in 2004, Katich established himself in the Australian team. His best Test batting performance came against India at Sydney in January 2004, when his 125 and unbeaten 77 saved Australia the Test, series, and a decade long unbeaten record at home. Despite this, he was dropped in favour of Andrew Symonds for Australia's next Test, in Sri Lanka, when Symonds was dropped after the first two Tests, Katich was picked for the third Test and made a patient 86. He regained his place and enjoyed a good Test series in India in October 2004, where he made good scores of 81 and 99. His good form continued with 118 against New Zealand in March 2005.

However, he had a poor Ashes tour of England later that year batting at number 6, and after scoring only two runs in the following two Tests (against the ICC World XI and the West Indies), he was dropped from the Test team. Katich was fined for showing dissent during the fourth Test to umpire Aleem Dar along with captain Ricky Ponting.

Since the commencement of the 2005–06 season, Katich attempted to cement his place in the Australian one day cricket team, having lost his Test place. Australia persisted with him throughout the VB Series and in South Africa, as Katich scored runs fairly consistently. However, he struggled in the DLF Cup in September 2006; the next month he lost his place at the top of the order to Shane Watson, who impressed Ponting with some attacking displays against the West Indies and an Indian state team. Katich was not picked in the 15 man squad to play in the World Cup in the West Indies. Katich played a total of 45 One day Internationals.

Selected for the 2008 Australian team's tour of India he found himself opening the batting with the injury to Phil Jaques.

He retained his spot for the home series against New Zealand. In the first Test, at the Gabba, Brisbane, he made 10 in the first innings (in which Australia was all out for 214 on a tough batting deck). However, in the second innings, Katich carried his bat through the innings; the first cricketer to do so at Test level since Mark Taylor in the late 1990s. He made 131 not out, 48.88% of Australia's total of 268, in an innings in which the next highest score was 31 (by Mitchell Johnson batting at no. 10). Katich's batting allowed Australia to post a victory target of 327, which it ultimately defended.

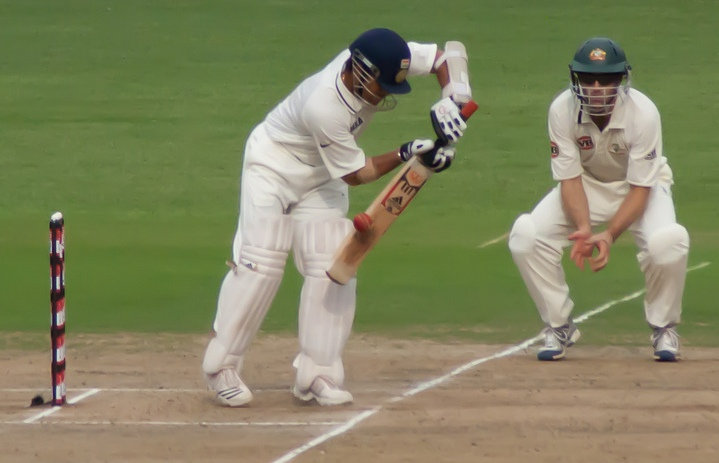
Katich fielding at short leg in a Test match against India in October 2010.

Katich was selected for the 2009 tour to England and he played in all five Ashes Tests, scoring 341 runs in 8 innings at an average of 42.62. Katich opened the batting with Phillip Hughes for the first two Tests at Cardiff and Lord's but Hughes was dropped for the Third Test at Edgbaston due to poor form, so Katich was then partnered by Shane Watson for the final three Tests. This proved successful as Watson and Katich scored more runs at the top of the order than the previous Hughes-Katich combination. Katich scored his eighth Test century in the First Test with 122. This was backed up later in the series with a half century. Katich scored these runs at a strike rate of 53.87. He also took six catches in the field and effected two direct hit run outs in the Fifth Test.

=== 2007–08 domestic season ===
The 2007–08 domestic season could only be described as a triumph for Katich. He scored 1,506 runs to break Michael Bevan's all-time Pura Cup/Sheffield Shield record for runs in a season as NSW romped home undefeated to claim their 45th title. Aside from being given the honour of captaining NSW in the Pura Cup final against Victoria, Katich also contributed scores of 86 and 92 to lead the match on run aggregate as he had done for the season overall. He was also crowned the Pura Cup player of the year for his 1506 runs at an average of 94.12. The highlight of Katich's season was undoubtedly his 306 against QLD at the SCG, an innings in which the last 200 runs came at better than a run a ball. It was the first time since Sir Donald Bradman that a player had scored 300 at the SCG, and an innings which the Sydney Morning Herald called "superb". Peter Roebuck later claimed Katich should be the Australian cricket captain after Ricky Ponting came under fire during the January 2008 SCG Test. During the coverage of the final, Damien Fleming described Katich as a left-handed V. V. S. Laxman for his dominant bottom hand and willingness to hit through the on-side. Katich's season culminated with his recall to the national team for May tour of the West Indies. He cemented his place in the Test team with scores of 113 and 157 in the second and third Tests respectively.

For his performances in 2010, he was named in the World Test XI by the ICC.

He was also awarded the Men's Test Player of the Year at the Allan Border Medal ceremony by the CA in 2010.

Despite his heroics, Katich, a former team mainstay, blamed Michael Clarke for effectively ending his career once he became captain in revenge for a post-match incident several years earlier which saw Katich grab Clarke by the throat following a row about the singing of Australia's team song in the dressing room.

== Coaching career ==
In October 2015, Katich was appointed as an assistant coach of Indian Premier League team Kolkata Knight Riders. In 2019 he was appointed as head coach for Royal Challengers Bangalore. He was replaced during the 2021 IPL and in December 2021, Katich was named as assistant coach of Sunrisers Hyderabad for IPL 2022 season. On 18 February 2022, he resigned from the assistant coach role of Sunrisers Hyderabad due to differences with the franchise's auction strategy. In September 2022, he was named as the head coach for MI Cape Town in the upcoming SA20 League.

== Personal life ==
Katich is of Croatian descent. His father's parents were born in Croatia and emigrated to Australia in the 1920s, eventually settling in Perth. His father, Vince, was a police detective who helped play a part in the capture of serial killers David and Catherine Birnie.

Katich attended Trinity College in Perth, Western Australia, where there is a cricket pavilion named after him. He holds a Bachelor of Commerce from the University of Western Australia. He married Georgie Willis in May 2006. They became parents in 2011 when their son was born.

He has no sense of smell, having lost it following a bout of glandular fever early in his career. This has not affected his ability at cooking, as he reached the semi-finals of Celebrity MasterChef Australia in 2009.

Katich formerly held the role of football operations manager of the Greater Western Sydney Giants AFL club.

Katich is Catholic and is quoted as saying, "My faith gives me a focus in how I lead my life and go about my cricket."

== Career highlights ==
=== Tests ===
Test debut: vs England, Leeds, 2001

- Katich's best Test batting score of 157 was made against West Indies, 2008
- His best Test bowling figures of 6 wickets for 65 runs came against Zimbabwe, Sydney, 2003–04
- Katich became the first Australian batsman since Mark Taylor in 1998 to carry his bat through a completed Test innings, notching 131 not out at the Gabba in 2008–09 vs New Zealand.
- Made ten Test match centuries, the first against India at Sydney in 2004. His highest Test match score of 157 runs was made against the West Indies in 2008 at the Kensington Oval.

=== One-day internationals ===
ODI Debut: vs Zimbabwe, Melbourne, 2000–01

- Katich's best ODI batting score of 107* was made against Sri Lanka, the Gabba, on 14 February 2006.

=== Twenty20 ===
He captained New South Wales to victory in the inaugural Champions League Twenty20 in 2009.

=== First-class ===
He scored 306 for New South Wales against Queensland in Sydney, 2007.

Sporting positions
Preceded by Graeme Welch	Derbyshire cricket captains 2007	Succeeded by Rikki Clarke
