= Phil Jaques =

Australian cricketer

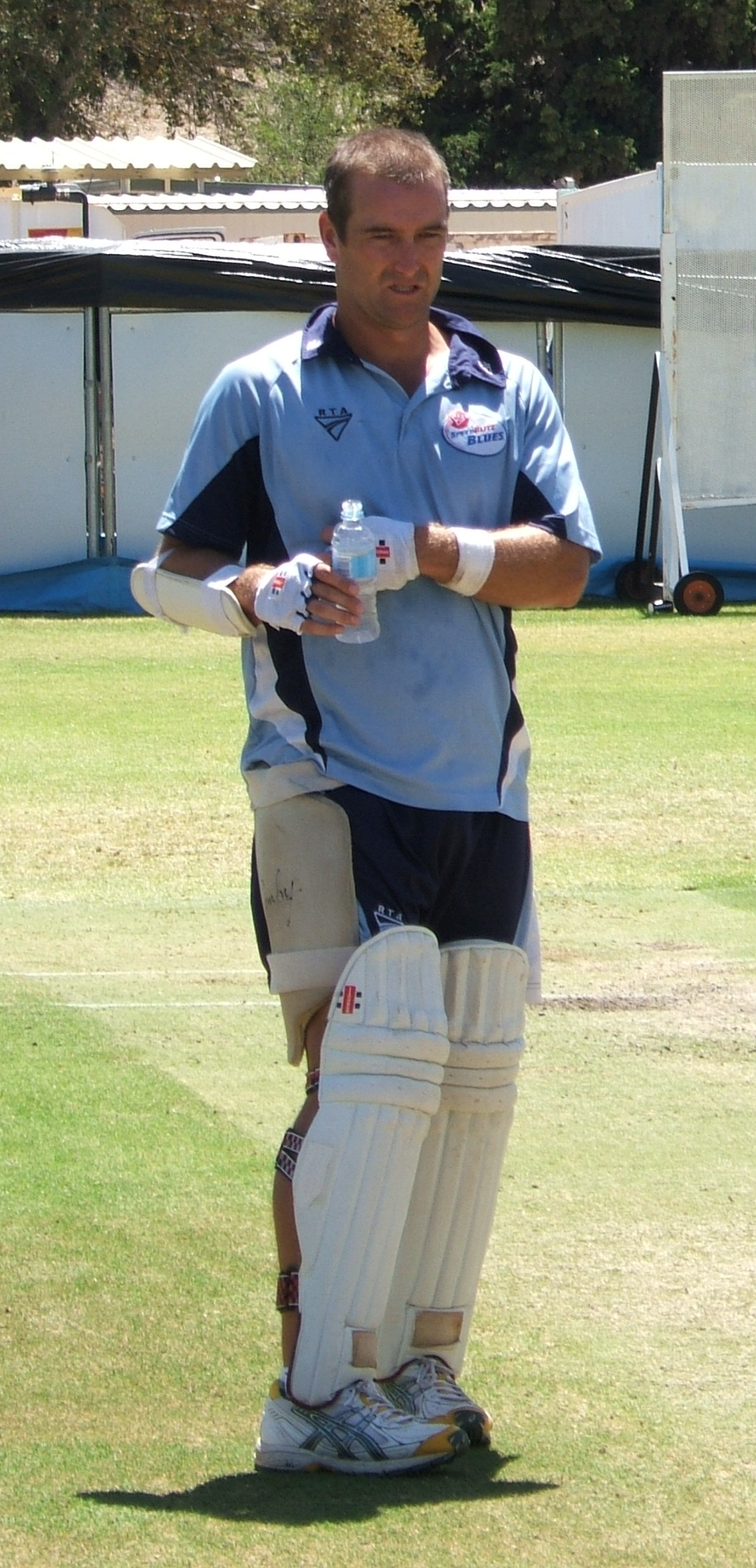

Personal information
- Full name: Philip Anthony Jaques
- Born: 3 May 1979 (age 47); Wollongong, New South Wales, Australia
- Nickname: Pro
- Height: 1.83 m (6 ft 0 in)
- Batting: Left-handed
- Bowling: Left-arm medium
- Role: Opening batsman

International information
- National side: Australia (2005–2008)
- Test debut (cap 395): 26 December 2005 v South Africa
- Last Test: 12 June 2008 v West Indies
- ODI debut (cap 158): 20 January 2006 v South Africa
- Last ODI: 18 February 2007 v New Zealand
- ODI shirt no.: 5

Domestic team information
- Years: Team
- 2000–2012: New South Wales
- 2003: Northamptonshire
- 2004–2005: Yorkshire
- 2006–2007: Worcestershire
- 2010: Worcestershire
- 2012–2013: Yorkshire (squad no. 2)
- 2014: Nottinghamshire

Career statistics
Competition	Test	ODI	FC	LA
Matches	11	6	200	165
Runs scored	902	125	16,035	6,180
Batting average	47.47	20.83	48.29	40.65
100s/50s	3/6	0/1	44/76	14/33
Top score	150	94	244	171*
Balls bowled	–	–	104	18
Wickets	–	–	1	0
Bowling average	–	–	162.00	–
5 wickets in innings	–	–	0	–
10 wickets in match	–	–	0	–
Best bowling	–	–	1/75	–
Catches/stumpings	7/–	3/–	149/–	43/–
- Source: CricketArchive, 4 July 2016

Philip Anthony Jaques (/ˈdʒɑːk/; born 3 May 1979) is a former Australian cricketer. He is a left-handed opening batsman who has played first-class cricket for New South Wales, Northamptonshire, Yorkshire and Worcestershire, as well as international cricket for Australia.

== Personal life ==
He was married to the Australian women's soccer player Danielle Small from 2006 to 2009. He is now married to Jessica Jaques.

== Early career and domestic success ==
Jaques commenced his cricketing career whilst a student at Nareena Hills Public School in Wollongong. A junior with the Wests team in Wollongong he moved onto the Sutherland club while still attending Figtree High School to further his career.

In 1999 Jaques was awarded a cricketing scholarship by New South Wales, which enabled him to spend the English summer playing for Northern Cricket Club near Liverpool. A last minute call up to the NSW team on 15 March 2001 for a match against Queensland saw him rush from Sydney to Brisbane where he arrived in time to debut at the unfamiliar number 10 position with the score at 70/8, up against a Queensland attack on a seaming green-top, he top scored with 40.

After struggling to establish himself for New South Wales thereafter, Jaques transformed his career by signing for the English County Championship side Northamptonshire in 2003. He was prolific, hitting over 1200 runs including a double century and returned to NSW an established member of the Pura Cup Champions. 2003/04 saw the consolidation of Jaques' English form in Australia as he built a reputation of being a player who could score quickly but also occupy the crease for many hours. After returning to England to play for Yorkshire (1,118 runs in 2004 and 1,359 in 2005) and maintaining a consistent standard with New South Wales (1,191 runs in 2004–05), many were calling for his promotion to the national team. He went back to England to play for Worcestershire for the 2006 and 2007 seasons, where he scored 1689 runs in 18 matches.

== Eligibility ==
Jaques was born to English parents, Stuart and Mary, and is a holder of a British passport. This made him eligible to play for both England and Australia. With Matthew Hayden and Justin Langer established at the top of the Australian batting lineup, Jaques himself did not rule out qualifying to become an English player. However, his desire to play for Australia proved too strong, and his record-breaking form in the 2004–05 season led to his Australian international call-up.

== International cricket ==
In 2005–06, a timely century in the Pura Cup followed three consecutive centuries in the ING Cup for New South Wales, and Jaques was selected for the Australian squad for the 2nd Test against South Africa starting on Boxing Day, 2005 in Melbourne after regular opener Justin Langer pulled a hamstring in the previous match. He was unable to capitalise, however, making only 2 and 28. Jaques was given another chance making 66 in his second Test against Bangladesh in April 2006 after Langer was ruled out with a concussion sustained in an earlier Test.

Making his One-Day International debut for Australia against South Africa, Jaques made 94, falling six runs short of his maiden century. His innings broke a 23-year-old record of the highest score on debut for Australia in a One-Day International. In November 2006, Jaques scored successive centuries in three days against England, in the warm up to the 2006–07 Ashes series in Australia. His first, playing for a Prime Minister's XI, was an impressive 112. His second was 107, playing for New South Wales. However, the selectors stuck with regular openers Hayden and Langer and Jaques was forced to bide his time with NSW. One year later, and following the retirement from international cricket of Justin Langer, Jaques was called up to the Test squad for the home series against Sri Lanka ahead of his rival for the place, Western Australia's Chris Rogers, in part due to a fluent second innings 167 in a Pura Cup match against Western Australia in which Rogers scored 9 and 17.

Jaques took full advantage of his opportunity to start to cement a permanent opening slot on the Australian side by scoring his maiden test century on the first test at the Gabba. Jaques was dropped on 68 and 90 but made the most of these lives to notch up his first hundred at international level with a boundary off the first ball after a drinks break. His century came from 196 balls and included 14 fours, it having taken him 34 deliveries to get off the mark. He was dismissed without adding to his score just seven balls later, stumped by Prasanna Jayawardene off Muttiah Muralitharan. One week later, Jaques impressed again by scoring 150 and 68 in the second test at the Bellerive Oval. This was enough for him to be selected as Hayden's opening partner for the 2008 West Indies tour where he starred with a century in the final test at Bridgetown. On the subsequent tour to India he was dropped when Simon Katich was selected ahead of him. He returned home early to have surgery on long term back problems, and did not return to the Test team.

== Records and achievements ==
- Jaques won the 2005–06 Australian Domestic Cricketer of the Year, at the 2006 Allan Border Medal Ceremony.
- In February 2007, Jaques came within a few runs of beating Victor Trumper's Sydney Grade Cricket record score compiling 321 for Sutherland against North Sydney in less than 6 hours.
- He has scored 8 first-class double centuries.
- Jaques claimed the highest score by a player on One Day International debut for Australia with a 94 against South Africa in Melbourne 2005/06, only for that to be beaten by Phillip Hughes in 2013.
- Scored his maiden test century in his third test; the first test of the 2007/08 Australian summer against Sri Lanka.
