= List of Western Australia first-class cricketers =

A total of 455 players have appeared for Western Australia in men's first-class cricket matches since the team's first-class debut during the 1892–93 Australian cricket season until the 2023–24 season. As of the end of the 2023–24 season, Western Australia as a team has played in more than 800 first-class matches, the majority against other Australian states in the Sheffield Shield.

== List ==
Statistics included are only for matches played for Western Australia
Players who hold a state contract for the 2015–16 season are marked with an asterisk (*)
Players who have played international cricket are highlighted in blue
Statistics are correct as of the midpoint of the 2015–16 season:

No.	Name	Nat	First	Last	Mat	Runs	HS	Avg	100	50	Wkt	BB	Ave	5wi	10wm	C	St	Ref
1	William Back	(Australia)	1892–93	1892–93	2	12	7	3.00	0	0	–	–	–	–	–	0	0	
2	Percival Hussey	(Australia)	1892–93	1892–93	2	27	14	6.75	0	0	–	–	–	–	–	0	0	
3	Bill Duffy	(Australia)	1892–93	1892–93	2	62	42	15.50	0	0	8	5/124	22.87	1	0	0	0	
4	Frederic North	(Australia)	1892–93	1892–93	2	109	77	27.25	0	1	2	2/14	7.00	0	0	1	0	
5	Herbert Orr	(England)	1892–93	1892–93	2	77	44	19.25	0	0	0	0/56	–	0	0	0	0	
6	Bill Bateman	(Australia)	1892–93	1892–93	2	21	20	7.00	0	0	2	2/38	35.50	0	0	3	0	
7	Thomas Cullinan	(Australia)	1892–93	1892–93	1	9	8	4.50	0	0	0	0/19	–	0	0	0	0	
8	Harry Bennett	(Australia)	1892–93	1892–93	2	13	10	3.25	0	0	–	–	–	–	–	1	0	
9	Ernest Randell	(Australia)	1892–93	1898–99	3	60	36	10.00	0	0	4	2/31	28.50	0	0	1	0	
10	Alf Moffat	(Australia)	1892–93	1892–93	2	3	2	1.50	0	0	1	1/30	47.00	0	0	0	0	
11	Edward Bishop	(Australia)	1892–93	1898–99	3	11	6	3.66	0	0	8	5/60	28.62	1	0	1	0	
12	Horace Wilson	(Australia)	1892–93	1892–93	1	13	10*	13.00	0	0	–	–	–	–	–	2	2	
13	Arthur Hoskings	(Australia)	1898–99	1898–99	1	79	53	39.50	0	1	0	0/18	–	0	0	0	0	
14	William Lockwood	(Australia)	1898–99	1898–99	1	21	21	10.50	0	0	–	–	–	–	–	0	0	
15	Frank Meares	(Australia)	1898–99	1898–99	1	32	16	16.00	0	0	0	0/9	–	0	0	1	0	
16	Lloyd Herring	(Australia)	1898–99	1898–99	1	41	34	20.50	0	0	–	–	–	–	–	0	0	
17	Vere Harris	(Australia)	1898–99	1898–99	1	54	32	27.00	0	0	–	–	–	–	–	2	0	
18	Ernest Keogh	(Australia)	1898–99	1898–99	1	14	13	7.00	0	0	2	1/27	34.00	0	0	0	0	
19	Arthur Jackson	(Australia)	1898–99	1898–99	1	47	43	23.50	0	0	–	–	–	–	–	0	0	
20	Rudolph Selk	(Australia)	1898–99	1912–13	16	192	34	11.29	0	0	75	8/28	24.58	6	2	6	0	
21	Bill Moore	(Australia)	1898–99	1898–99	1	18	14	9.00	0	0	–	–	–	–	–	1	1	
22	Harry Howard	(Australia)	1905–06	1924–25	20	781	77*	26.03	0	5	6	3/52	36.50	0	0	7	0	
23	Ernie Parker	(Australia)	1905–06	1909–10	11	804	117	36.54	2	4	0	0/26	–	0	0	7	0	
24	Harold Rowe	(Australia)	1905–06	1929–30	25	916	105	19.91	1	4	0	0/28	–	0	0	20	0	
25	Karl Quist	(Australia)	1905–06	1905–06	2	111	56	27.75	0	1	0	0/22	–	0	0	2	0	
26	Thomas Coombe	(Australia)	1905–06	1905–06	1	15	15	7.50	0	0	–	–	–	–	–	0	0	
27	Lionel Gouly	(Australia)	1905–06	1907–08	4	140	70*	35.00	0	1	–	–	–	–	–	0	0	
28	Harold Evers	(Australia)	1905–06	1920–21	13	315	43	16.57	0	0	–	–	–	–	–	14	12	
29	Thomas Coyne	(Australia)	1905–06	1908–09	4	144	62	20.57	0	1	11	5/27	17.63	1	0	2	0	
30	Henry Edmondson	(Australia)	1905–06	1912–13	6	194	68	17.63	0	2	4	2/21	56.50	0	0	1	1 (Note: Edmondson substituted for Harold Evers as wicket-keeper during part of the second innings in a match against South Australia in 1912, taking one stumping, but was never named in the team as wicket-keeper.)	
31	William Kelly	(Australia)	1905–06	1905–06	2	10	9	5.00	0	0	3	2/41	37.33	0	0	1	0	
32	Victor Jones	(Australia)	1905–06	1905–06	1	16	15	8.00	0	0	0	0/24	–	0	0	1	0	
33	Ernest Harvey	(Australia)	1905–06	1905–06	1	14	14*	–	0	0	0	0/17	–	0	0	0	0	
34	Charles Munro	(Australia)	1905–06	1909–10	3	55	26*	13.75	0	0	5	4/63	44.80	0	0	3	0	
35	William Dunstan	(Australia)	1905–06	1909–10	1	0	0	0.00	0	0	–	–	–	–	–	0	1	
36	Thomas Hogue	(Australia)	1906–07	1912–13	15	815	119	31.34	1	5	36	4/26	22.38	0	0	8	0	
37	Clement Wellington	(Australia)	1906–07	1906–07	1	9	5	4.50	0	0	–	–	–	–	–	0	0	
38	Otto Kelly	(Australia)	1906–07	1907–08	3	75	23	15.00	0	0	–	–	–	–	–	0	0	
39	Arthur Christian	(Australia)	1906–07	1921–22	17	757	97	24.41	0	5	79	7/144	25.07	5	2	6	0	
40	Jack Chamberlain	(Australia)	1906–07	1906–07	1	11	11	5.50	0	0	0	0/17	–	0	0	1	0	
41	Mac Evans	(Australia)	1906–07	1924–25	11	270	34*	15.00	0	0	1	1/33	214.00	0	0	6	0	
42	Ernie Jones	(Australia)	1906–07	1907–08	3	98	48	16.33	0	0	9	4/40	31.00	0	0	3	0	
43	Alexander Robinson	(Australia)	1907–08	1907–08	1	24	23	12.00	0	0	–	–	–	–	–	0	0	
44	Wallace Hogue	(Australia)	1907–08	1912–13	8	163	33	14.81	0	0	1	1/15	249.00	0	0	2	0	
45	George Moysey	(Australia)	1907–08	1907–08	1	13	8	6.50	0	0	–	–	–	–	–	0	0	
46	Albert Banks	(Australia)	1908–09	1920–21	2	23	19	7.66	0	0	3	3/84	35.00	0	0	2	0	
47	Alfred Patfield	(Australia)	1908–09	1909–10	3	61	21*	15.25	0	0	–	–	–	–	–	2	5	
48	Walter Harper	(Australia)	1908–09	1908–09	3	16	11*	16.00	0	0	2	2/16	44.50	0	0	0	0	
49	Theodore Anderson	(Australia)	1908–09	1909–10	4	40	14	6.66	0	0	2	2/42	41.00	0	0	2	0	
50	Theodore Hantke	(Australia)	1908–09	1908–09	1	2	2	2.00	0	0	0	0/4	–	0	0	0	0	
51	Walter Hennah	(Australia)	1909–10	1909–10	1	0	0	0.00	0	0	0	0/52	–	0	0	1	0	
52	Reginald Carter	(Australia)	1909–10	1909–10	3	97	32	19.40	0	0	0	0/14	–	0	0	1	0	
53	Jim Everett	(Australia)	1909–10	1909–10	1	13	13	6.50	0	0	0	0/48	–	0	0	1	0	
54	Henry Walkerden	(Australia)	1909–10	1909–10	1	6	6	3.00	0	0	–	–	–	–	–	0	0	
55	Norman Good	(Australia)	1909–10	1909–10	1	52	48	13.00	0	0	–	–	–	–	–	0	0	
56	Leonidas Bott	(Australia)	1912–13	1925–26	14	400	54	16.66	0	1	4	2/3	31.75	0	0	7	0	
57	Walter Hughes	(Australia)	1912–13	1912–13	5	38	13*	7.60	0	0	19	4/41	29.21	0	0	6	0	
58	Charles Lehmann	(Australia)	1912–13	1912–13	2	17	10	8.50	0	0	4	4/64	38.25	0	0	2	0	
59	Alfred Randell	(Australia)	1912–13	1921–22	5	156	61	22.28	0	1	–	–	–	–	–	3	0	
60	Eric Healy	(Australia)	1920–21	1920–21	1	1	1	1.00	0	0	–	–	–	–	–	0	0	
61	Charlie Robinson	(Australia)	1920–21	1920–21	1	16	16	16.00	0	0	2	2/125	62.50	0	0	0	0	
62	Andrew Meek	(Australia)	1920–21	1925–26	5	40	12*	5.71	0	0	2	2/97	118.50	0	0	1	0	
63	Fred Buttsworth	(Australia)	1920–21	1925–26	7	153	100	17.00	1	0	13	3/45	41.84	0	0	2	0	
64	Walter Butler	(Australia)	1921–22	1921–22	1	10	6	5.00	0	0	–	–	–	–	–	0	0	
65	Robert Blundell	(Australia)	1921–22	1924–25	5	178	52	19.77	0	1	5	5/59	23.40	1	0	2	0	
66	William Stokes	(Australia)	1921–22	1928–29	8	58	12	5.27	0	0	–	–	–	–	–	8	0	
67	Allan Evans	(Australia)	1921–22	1931–32	20	543	53	15.51	0	1	34	5/37	36.70	1	0	13	0	
68	Leonard Packham	(Australia)	1921–22	1921–22	1	27	19	13.50	0	0	0	0/54	–	0	0	0	0	
69	Joseph Lanigan	(Australia)	1921–22	1922–23	2	76	64*	38.00	0	1	4	3/124	51.00	0	0	0	0	
70	Victor Carlson	(Australia)	1921–22	1925–26	3	14	10	2.80	0	0	0	0/5	–	0	0	1	0	
71	Dolph Heinrichs	(Australia)	1922–23	1922–23	2	127	91*	63.50	0	1	–	–	–	–	–	0	0	
72	Clarrie Fleay	(Australia)	1922–23	1922–23	1	4	4	4.00	0	0	2	2/10	18.00	0	0	2	0	
73	Frederick Taaffe	(Australia)	1922–23	1936–37	17	623	79	21.48	0	4	7	5/89	53.71	1	0	5	0	
74	Archibald Hardie	(Australia)	1922–23	1922–23	2	49	17	12.25	0	0	6	4/112	33.50	0	0	0	0	
75	James Herbert	(Australia)	1922–23	1926–27	5	59	19*	7.37	0	0	5	2/30	31.20	0	0	1	0	
76	Harry Clark	(Australia)	1922–23	1922–23	1	1	1	0.50	0	0	0	0/18	–	0	0	0	0	
77	Leslie Renfrey	(Australia)	1922–23	1927–28	10	212	30*	21.20	0	0	13	3/47	52.53	0	0	3	0	
78	Leslie Freemantle	(Australia)	1924–25	1925–26	3	131	87	21.83	0	1	5	4/118	60.60	0	0	6	0	
79	Richard Bryant	(Australia)	1924–25	1936–37	28	1076	103	22.89	1	4	19	4/48	36.31	0	0	15	0	
80	Robert Hewson	(Australia)	1924–25	1931–32	13	256	38	16.00	0	0	–	–	–	–	–	10	6	
81	William Miller	(Australia)	1924–25	1924–25	1	14	14	14.00	0	0	1	1/23	23.00	0	0	0	0	
82	Harold Fidock	(Australia)	1924–25	1929–30	3	50	35	12.50	0	0	3	2/54	50.66	0	0	2	0	
83	Morris Loton	(Australia)	1924–25	1924–25	1	40	38	20.00	0	0	–	–	–	–	–	1	0	
84	Albert Drew	(Australia)	1924–25	1932–33	13	298	42	11.92	0	0	2	1/24	82.00	0	0	10	0	
85	Richard Cantwell	(Australia)	1924–25	1924–25	1	0	0	0.00	0	0	–	–	–	–	–	1	0	
86	Patrick Quinlan	(Australia)	1925–26	1928–29	8	270	50	20.76	0	1	8	2/38	47.75	0	0	3	0	
87	Merv Inverarity	(Australia)	1925–26	1939–40	26	736	68*	17.11	0	4	53	6/162	39.69	3	0	12	0	
88	Henry Grigg	(Australia)	1925–26	1925–26	3	81	30	13.50	0	0	–	–	–	–	–	1	0	
89	Vernon Loton	(Australia)	1925–26	1925–26	2	25	21	12.50	0	0	–	–	–	–	–	0	1	
90	Alfred Smith	(Australia)	1925–26	1926–27	2	61	16	15.25	0	0	–	–	–	–	–	0	0	
91	Bert Harrold	(Australia)	1925–26	1925–26	1	21	21*	–	0	0	2	2/89	44.50	0	0	0	0	
92	Bill Bryant	(Australia)	1926–27	1926–27	1	6	6	3.00	0	0	–	–	–	–	–	1	0	
93	Frank Bryant	(Australia)	1926–27	1936–37	19	946	115	29.56	2	5	0	0/10	–	0	0	7	0	
94	Bill Horrocks	(England)	1926–27	1936–37	11	607	148*	35.70	1	5	0	0/7	–	0	0	4	0	
95	Ron Doig	(Australia)	1926–27	1931–32	3	56	16	11.20	0	0	1	1/37	79.00	0	0	0	0	
96	Robert Wilberforce	(Australia)	1926–27	1937–38	9	324	59	20.25	0	2	10	2/4	32.60	0	0	3	0	
97	Albert Rigby	(Australia)	1926–27	1926–27	1	9	5	4.50	0	0	0	0/17	–	0	0	0	0	
98	Arthur Richardson	(Australia)	1927–28	1929–30	4	128	56	25.60	0	1	9	3/18	26.77	0	0	3	0	
99	William McRae	(Australia)	1927–28	1928–29	3	186	119	46.50	1	0	1	1/53	69.00	0	0	0	0	
100	Henry Newman	(Australia)	1927–28	1931–32	3	37	17*	12.33	0	0	1	1/81	265.00	0	0	0	0	
101	Ron Halcombe	(Australia)	1928–29	1939–40	17	85	14*	5.31	0	0	34	5/40	37.61	1	0	5	0	
102	Alexander Webster	(Australia)	1929–30	1929–30	3	17	8	4.33	0	0	4	2/36	45.25	0	0	0	0	
103	Ernest Bromley	(Australia)	1929–30	1931–32	6	247	78	20.58	0	2	10	4/64	40.80	0	0	4	0	
104	Hugh Baird	(Australia)	1929–30	1929–30	1	0	0	0.00	0	0	0	0/34	–	0	0	0	0	
105	Harold Lang	(Australia)	1929–30	1931–32	2	42	29	10.50	0	0	–	–	–	–	–	0	0	
106	William "Nipper" Truscott	(Australia)	1929–30	1929–30	1	2	2	1.00	0	0	–	–	–	–	–	0	1	
107	Eric McKenzie	(Australia)	1931–32	1931–32	1	43	26	21.50	0	0	–	–	–	–	–	0	0	
108	Pike Curtin	(Australia)	1931–32	1931–32	3	64	35	16.00	0	0	2	1/40	81.50	0	0	0	0	
109	Wyndham Hill-Smith	(Australia)	1931–32	1933–34	8	344	68	28.66	0	4	–	–	–	–	–	3	0	
110	Frank Alexander	(Australia)	1931–32	1937–38	13	391	48	16.29	0	0	0	0/32	–	0	0	4	0	
111	Barney Wood	(Australia)	1931–32	1931–32	1	8	6	4.00	0	0	0	0/16	–	0	0	1	0	
112	Henry Calder	(Australia)	1932–33	1932–33	1	9	9	9.00	0	0	–	–	–	–	–	1	0	
113	Carlisle Jarvis	(Australia)	1932–33	1932–33	1	3	3	3.00	0	0	–	–	–	–	–	2	0	
114	Ossie Lovelock	(Australia)	1932–33	1939–40	20	731	94*	27.07	0	3	–	–	–	–	–	18	16	
115	Ted Martin	(Australia)	1932–33	1932–33	1	2	2	2.00	0	0	6	3/50	27.50	0	0	0	0	
116	Barney O'Shaughnessy	(Australia)	1932–33	1932–33	1	0	0	0.00	0	0	1	1/31	81.00	0	0	1	0	
117	Roderick Ryan	(Australia)	1933–34	1933–34	4	141	29	20.14	0	0	–	–	–	–	–	1	0	
118	Stanley Francis	(Australia)	1933–34	1936–37	8	149	26*	16.55	0	0	23	5/49	25.73	2	0	3	0	
119	Jim Ditchburn	(Australia)	1933–34	1935–36	9	127	27*	12.70	0	0	22	4/46	30.63	0	0	3	0	
120	John Jones	(Australia)	1933–34	1935–36	10	104	22	14.85	0	0	27	4/59	34.77	0	0	10	0	
121	Ronald Sartori	(Australia)	1933–34	1933–34	3	11	8	5.50	0	0	4	2/76	46.75	0	0	1	0	
122	Ivan Campbell	(Australia)	1933–34	1933–34	2	16	9	8.00	0	0	–	–	–	–	–	1	0	
123	William Roach	(Australia)	1933–34	1933–34	3	31	17	10.33	0	0	–	–	–	–	–	1	0	
124	Anthony Zimbulis	(Australia)	1933–34	1939–40	14	297	42*	14.14	0	0	41	5/80	40.34	1	0	13	0	
125	Richard Roe	(Australia)	1934–35	1934–35	2	136	58	34.00	0	1	–	–	–	–	–	1	0	
126	Douglas McKenzie	(Australia)	1934–35	1945–46	4	214	88	35.66	0	3	–	–	–	–	–	1	0	
127	George Gardiner	(Australia)	1934–35	1937–38	6	157	28*	17.44	0	0	10	5/21	27.10	1	0	2	0	
128	Dudley Everett	(Australia)	1935–36	1935–36	1	0	0	0.00	0	0	–	–	–	–	–	0	0	
129	Frederick Newman	(Australia)	1935–36	1936–37	2	67	28	22.33	0	0	4	2/38	35.75	0	0	0	0	
130	Robert Kimpton	(Australia)	1935–36	1935–36	1	8	8	8.00	0	0	–	–	–	–	–	1	0	
131	Alan Jeffreys	(Australia)	1936–37	1939–40	4	123	36	15.37	0	0	–	–	–	–	–	3	0	
132	William Rowlands	(Australia)	1937–38	1938–39	6	168	49	16.80	0	0	0	0/8	–	0	0	4	0	
133	Gerald Arthur	(Australia)	1937–38	1938–39	3	53	27	8.83	0	0	–	–	–	–	–	4	1	
134	George Evans	(Australia)	1937–38	1937–38	2	26	26	6.50	0	0	–	–	–	–	–	0	0	
135	Gordon Eyres	(Australia)	1937–38	1939–40	7	109	41	10.90	0	0	22	5/47	28.86	2	0	4	0	
136	Leslie Mills	(Australia)	1937–38	1938–39	4	20	14	4.00	0	0	3	2/42	94.66	0	0	2	0	
137	John Shea	(Australia)	1937–38	1945–46	4	232	110	29.00	1	0	–	–	–	–	–	1	0	
138	Wally Buttsworth	(Australia)	1937–38	1937–38	2	62	35	15.50	0	0	–	–	–	–	–	1	0	
139	Keith Jeffreys	(Australia)	1937–38	1945–46	6	194	49	24.25	0	0	3	2/56	51.66	0	0	1	0	
140	Merv Bessen	(Australia)	1937–38	1937–38	1	40	39	20.00	0	0	–	–	–	–	–	0	0	
141	Charlie MacGill	(Australia)	1938–39	1950–51	6	250	78	25.00	0	1	19	4/45	29.42	0	0	5	0	
142	Hubba Read	(Australia)	1938–39	1939–40	3	179	55	25.00	0	1	–	–	–	–	–	2	0	
143	David Watt	(Australia)	1938–39	1948–49	16	922	129	34.14	1	8	7	2/2	23.42	0	0	7	0	
144	Alexander Barras	(Australia)	1938–39	1947–48	6	352	113	44.00	1	2	1	1/22	75.00	0	0	4	0	
145	Laurie Bandy	(Australia)	1939–40	1947–48	7	270	53*	27.00	0	1	3	2/16	36.33	0	0	6	0	
146	Charlie Puckett	(Australia)	1939–40	1952–53	33	610	75	14.52	0	1	149	6/35	25.47	13	2	23	0	
147	George Robinson	(Australia)	1945–46	1947–48	7	464	134	38.66	1	2	–	–	–	–	–	2	0	
148	Ernest England	(Australia)	1945–46	1953–54	5	213	71	30.42	0	2	0	0/11	–	0	0	4	0	
149	Morgan Herbert	(Australia)	1945–46	1954–55	16	343	53	13.19	0	1	40	7/45	39.02	2	0	9	0	
150	Jan Epstein	(Australia)	1945–46	1946–46	1	33	33	33.00	0	0	3	3/33	11.00	0	0	0	0	
151	Gwilym Kessey	(Australia)	1945–46	1949–50	12	286	60	19.06	0	1	–	–	–	–	–	18	5	
152	Kenneth Cumming	(Australia)	1945–46	1947–48	9	35	10	3.88	0	0	22	6/62	28.04	1	0	3	0	
153	Herbert Rigg	(Australia)	1946–47	1958–59	12	431	76	23.94	0	1	2	1/13	56.50	0	0	12	0	
154	Allan Edwards	(Australia)	1946–47	1956–57	44	2325	105	32.29	3	13	14	4/54	24.71	0	0	34	0	
155	Wally Langdon	(Australia)	1946–47	1955–56	29	1857	138	37.14	5	9	23	4/28	41.56	0	0	22	0	
156	Tom O'Dwyer	(Australia)	1946–47	1959–60	15	305	51	16.05	0	1	41	7/79	34.51	3	0	8	0	
157	Keith Carmody	(Australia)	1947–48	1955–56	35	1861	198	28.19	1	11	1	1/8	42.00	0	0	26	2	
158	Fred Buttsworth	(Australia)	1947–48	1949–50	8	343	60	22.86	0	2	–	–	–	–	–	26	2	
159	Basil Rigg	(Australia)	1947–48	1956–57	18	511	65	17.03	0	2	8	2/46	86.12	0	0	11	0	
160	Tom Outridge	(Australia)	1947–48	1952–53	19	724	93	20.68	0	4	21	5/78	45.57	1	0	8	0	
161	Ron Sands	(Australia)	1947–48	1947–48	1	15	13	7.50	0	0	–	–	–	–	–	1	0	
162	Douglas Williams	(Australia)	1948–49	1951–52	8	267	51	16.68	0	2	3	1/24	40.33	0	0	5	0	
163	Edmund Edwards	(Australia)	1948–49	1948–49	2	47	21	11.75	0	0	–	–	–	–	–	1	0	
164	Peter Dunn	(Australia)	1948–49	1952–53	18	169	33*	8.45	0	0	48	6/26	31.39	2	0	16	0	
165	John Munro	(Australia)	1948–49	1954–55	26	497	53*	11.55	0	1	1	1/18	18.00	0	0	56	4	
166	Ron Frankish	(Australia)	1948–49	1952–53	19	799	104	24.21	1	2	20	4/72	36.25	0	0	20	0	
167	Alexander Dick	(Australia)	1948–49	1948–49	1	8	8	4.00	0	0	0	0/11	–	0	0	0	0	
168	Lester Charlesworth	(Australia)	1949–50	1950–51	8	494	122	32.93	1	1	0	0/14	–	0	0	8	0	
169	Walter Driver	(Australia)	1949–50	1949–50	4	359	109	44.87	1	1	0	0/24	–	0	0	1	0	
170	Harry Price	(Australia)	1949–50	1955–56	25	374	33	14.38	0	0	90	5/49	27.50	4	1	11	0	
171	Ian Dick	(Australia)	1950–51	1950–51	1	27	27	13.50	0	0	–	–	–	–	–	0	0	
172	Chester Bennett	(Australia)	1950–51	1951–52	2	73	42*	24.33	0	0	4	1/20	34.25	0	0	1	0	
173	Patrick McCarthy	(Australia)	1950–51	1954–55	7	386	98	27.57	0	2	–	–	–	–	–	3	0	
174	Arthur Lovett	(Australia)	1950–51	1950–51	1	6	6	3.00	0	0	1	1/25	40.00	0	0	1	0	
175	Ronald Sarre	(Australia)	1951–52	1954–55	15	523	103	18.67	1	1	9	3/39	22.22	0	0	5	0	
176	Harry Gorringe	(Australia)	1951–52	1958–59	27	224	25	7.46	0	0	87	8/56	34.98	2	1	12	0	
177	John Rutherford	(Australia)	1952–53	1960–61	38	2383	167	36.10	5	11	18	3/12	56.66	0	0	26	0	
178	Ken Meuleman	(Australia)	1952–53	1960–61	48	3398	234*	51.48	11	13	10	2/58	63.70	0	0	13	0	
179	Alan Cripps	(Australia)	1952–53	1952–53	2	27	16	6.75	0	0	–	–	–	–	–	1	0	
180	Arnold Byfield	(Australia)	1952–53	1953–54	6	251	39	27.88	0	0	2	2/8	21.50	0	0	6	0	
181	Alexander Robinson	(Australia)	1952–53	1952–53	2	24	20	6.00	0	0	–	–	–	–	–	0	0	
182	Ray Strauss	(Australia)	1952–53	1959–60	34	778	52	16.55	0	2	128	7/59	23.71	8	0	11	0	
183	Alan Preen	(Australia)	1953–54	1956–57	13	158	27*	13.16	0	0	28	6/97	34.96	1	0	8	0	
184	Maurice Foley	(Australia)	1953–54	1953–54	3	101	43	16.83	0	0	–	–	–	–	–	2	0	
185	Len Pavy	(Australia)	1953–54	1955–56	6	124	31	12.40	0	0	0	0/10	–	0	0	4	0	
186	Eric James	(Australia)	1953–54	1954–55	2	25	24	8.33	0	0	5	2/81	60.40	0	0	0	0	
187	Laurie Sawle	(Australia)	1954–55	1960–61	34	1669	109*	29.28	1	9	0	0/13	–	0	0	17	0	
188	Bruce Buggins	(Australia)	1954–55	1962–63	62	1188	60*	14.48	0	1	1	1/1	1.00	0	0	143	19	
189	Murray Vernon	(Australia)	1955–56	1967–68	71	4067	173	34.78	8	22	9	3/15	25.66	0	0	53	0	
190	Keith Slater	(Australia)	1955–56	1967–68	67	2114	154	21.35	1	13	122	4/33	43.96	0	0	47	0	
191	Barry Shepherd	(Australia)	1955–56	1965–66	83	5340	219	42.04	12	26	3	1/1	97.66	0	0	56	0	
192	Ron Gaunt	(Australia)	1955–56	1959–60	29	250	27*	9.61	0	0	109	7/104	26.55	5	0	8	0	
193	Des Hoare	(Australia)	1955–56	1965–66	54	1164	133	18.77	1	3	194	8/98	26.15	10	1	23	0	
194	Bob Simpson	(Australia)	1956–57	1960–61	24	2470	236*	79.67	6	13	36	5/45	32.75	1	0	30	0	
195	Hugh Bevan	(Australia)	1956–57	1963–64	40	320	26	8.20	0	0	115	6/22	34.21	1	0	11	0	
196	John Stubbs	(Australia)	1956–57	1961–62	3	9	4	1.80	0	0	4	2/29	50.25	0	0	0	0	
197	Roy Watson	(Australia)	1957–58	1958–59	6	91	28*	15.16	0	0	–	–	–	–	–	20	0	
198	Trevor Bidstrup	(Australia)	1957–58	1960–61	2	32	20	10.66	0	0	4	2/35	44.50	0	0	0	0	
199	Gerry Connor	(Australia)	1958–59	1958–59	4	73	22	9.12	0	0	0	0/13	–	0	0	3	0	
200	Lewis Germaine	(Australia)	1958–59	1958–59	7	96	46*	12.00	0	0	12	4/118	49.08	0	0	2	0	
201	Derek Woodhead	(Australia)	1958–59	1959–60	7	269	101*	29.88	1	0	–	–	–	–	–	1	0	
202	Arthur Lodge	(Australia)	1958–59	1961–62	15	616	85	26.78	0	4	–	–	–	–	–	17	0	
203	Neil Hawke	(Australia)	1959–60	1959–60	7	189	89	21.00	0	1	6	2/22	57.33	0	0	5	0	
204	Tony Mateljan	(Australia)	1959–60	1959–60	2	19	19	9.50	0	0	2	1/40	84.50	0	0	2	0	
205	Peter Wishart	(Australia)	1959–60	1964–65	26	1105	114	26.95	1	6	0	0/19	–	0	0	4	0	
206	Graham McKenzie	(Australia)	1959–60	1973–74	81	1622	69	17.07	0	8	254	6/100	32.05	7	0	37	0	
207	Kevin Gartrell	(Australia)	1959–60	1962–63	10	482	102	25.36	1	2	1	1/42	127.00	0	0	8	0	
208	Hartley Joynt	(Australia)	1960–61	1964–65	16	440	56	15.17	0	2	1	1/9	33.00	0	0	15	0	
209	John Parker	(Australia)	1960–61	1964–65	29	1425	139*	29.68	1	8	0	0/7	–	0	0	9	0	
210	Ian Brayshaw	(Australia)	1960–61	1977–78	101	4325	160	31.80	3	26	178	10/44	25.08	7	2	108	0	
211	Keith Punch	(Australia)	1960–61	1963–64	15	599	76	23.03	0	3	16	3/48	36.43	0	0	14	0	
212	Rohan Kanhai	(British Guiana)	1961–62	1961–62	8	533	135	41.00	2	2	0	0/21	–	0	0	3	0	
213	Russell Waugh	(Australia)	1961–62	1963–64	12	552	87	27.60	0	2	1	1/12	64.00	0	0	4	0	
214	Geoffrey Forsaith	(Australia)	1961–62	1961–62	1	1	1	1.00	0	0	2	2/43	45.50	0	0	1	0	
215	Kenneth Ferries	(Australia)	1961–62	1961–62	1	9	9	9.00	0	0	1	1/61	61.00	0	0	0	0	
216	Henry Bovell	(Australia)	1961–62	1961–62	1	15	10	7.50	0	0	–	–	–	–	–	0	0	
217	Warren Smith	(Australia)	1961–62	1962–63	9	359	77	19.94	0	2	–	–	–	–	–	10	0	
218	Laurie Mayne	(Australia)	1961–62	1968–69	32	333	50	11.10	0	1	125	7/75	32.72	5	0	10	0	
219	Colin Harburn	(Australia)	1961–62	1964–65	7	307	139	23.61	1	2	0	0/3	–	0	0	4	0	
220	Tony Lock	(England)	1962–63	1970–71	74	1467	66	16.12	0	2	316	7/53	24.58	16	2	84	0	
221	John Inverarity	(Australia)	1962–63	1978–79	119	7607	187	40.89	20	36	55	3/1	35.52	0	0	156	0	
222	Ian Gallash	(Australia)	1962–63	1963–64	10	100	30*	9.09	0	0	24	4/18	40.50	0	0	3	0	
223	Alan Jones	(Wales)	1963–64	1963–64	9	503	66	27.94	0	3	1	1/24	32.00	0	0	2	0	
224	Gordon Becker	(Australia)	1963–64	1968–69	44	2062	195	28.63	3	12	–	–	–	–	–	100	17	
225	Terry Jenner	(Australia)	1963–64	1966–67	24	748	69	21.37	0	1	34	4/49	59.00	0	0	11	0	
226	Derek Chadwick	(Australia)	1963–64	1971–72	65	3886	137	35.98	9	14	0	0/37	–	0	0	45	0	
227	Peter Loader	(England)	1963–64	1963–64	1	0	0	0.00	0	0	0	0/85	–	0	0	0	0	
228	Tony Mann	(Australia)	1963–64	1983–84	76	2355	110	24.27	1	11	196	6/34	33.63	5	0	45	0	
229	Peter Kelly	(Australia)	1964–65	1966–67	21	1556	132	43.22	4	7	0	0/47	–	0	0	10	0	
230	George Murray	(Australia)	1964–65	1964–65	1	1	1	1.00	0	0	3	2/44	31.33	0	0	0	0	
231	Ross Edwards	(Australia)	1964–65	1974–75	71	4481	158	41.87	11	22	1	1/24	29.00	0	0	79	8	
232	Jim Hubble	(Australia)	1964–65	1974–75	15	234	54	21.27	0	1	47	7/49	30.44	1	1	7	0	
233	Brian Muggleton	(Australia)	1964–65	1969–70	3	50	21	8.33	0	0	1	1/2	2.00	0	0	0	0	
234	Jock Irvine	(Australia)	1964–65	1970–71	30	1602	182	35.60	3	8	1	1/43	120.00	0	0	26	0	
235	Bill Playle	(New Zealand)	1965–66	1967–68	17	802	122	25.87	2	1	0	0/65	–	0	0	10	0	
236	Bob Massie	(Australia)	1965–66	1973–74	28	171	23	10.05	0	0	91	4/18	26.79	0	0	4	0	
237	Colin Milburn	(England)	1966–67	1968–69	17	1414	243	52.37	3	8	5	2/16	60.40	0	0	15	0	
238	Colin Guest	(Australia)	1966–67	1966–67	7	328	74	32.80	0	2	16	3/34	38.18	0	0	3	0	
239	Leslie Varis	(Australia)	1966–67	1972–73	19	625	94	20.83	0	2	16	2/8	37.81	0	0	18	0	
240	Sam Gannon	(Australia)	1966–67	1978–79	37	138	20	6.57	0	0	106	6/107	30.22	2	0	16	0	
241	Danny McEvoy	(Australia)	1966–67	1966–67	2	40	28	13.33	0	0	–	–	–	–	–	3	0	
242	Bruce Yardley	(Australia)	1966–67	1989–90	59	1579	97*	22.55	0	4	175	7/44	25.97	12	2	24	0	
243	Ron Bowe	(Australia)	1967–68	1968–69	3	110	86	22.00	0	1	–	–	–	–	–	3	0	
244	Rod Marsh	(Australia)	1968–69	1983–84	97	5175	236	35.93	8	25	0	0/17	–	0	0	356	34	
245	Stanley Wilson	(Australia)	1968–69	1972–73	6	20	14*	10.00	0	0	14	4/29	39.57	0	0	1	0	
246	Bob Meuleman	(Australia)	1968–69	1971–72	14	545	101*	28.68	1	3	0	0/0	–	0	0	6	0	
247	Bob Cowper	(Australia)	1968–69	1968–69	3	27	15	6.75	0	0	2	2/30	50.00	0	0	10	0	
248	Terry MacGill	(Australia)	1968–69	1972–73	12	210	34	15.00	0	0	23	4/94	40.04	0	0	7	0	
249	Terry Prindiville	(Australia)	1969–70	1971–72	12	610	107	30.50	1	1	3	3/26	22.66	0	0	15	0	
250	Dennis Lillee	(Australia)	1969–70	1983–84	76	980	54*	14.62	0	1	351	7/36	23.01	19	4	26	0	
251	Clark Scarff	(Australia)	1969–70	1970–71	4	165	67	27.50	0	1	–	–	–	–	–	0	0	
252	Ken McAullay	(Australia)	1970–71	1973–74	22	1251	86	31.27	0	9	–	–	–	–	–	14	0	
253	Brian Hanna	(Australia)	1970–71	1972–73	7	213	51*	17.75	0	1	–	–	–	–	–	6	0	
254	Graeme Watson	(Australia)	1971–72	1974–75	25	1298	145+	36.05	2	6	59	5/53	26.06	4	0	29	0	
255	Barry Thornton	(Australia)	1971–72	1971–72	1	24	16*	–	0	0	1	1/47	87.00	0	0	0	0	
256	Bruce Duperouzel	(Australia)	1971–72	1972–73	5	143	43	23.83	0	0	–	–	–	–	–	7	0	
257	Paul Nicholls	(Australia)	1971–72	1978–79	19	492	38	23.42	0	0	30	5/68	31.43	1	0	7	0	
258	Ric Charlesworth	(Australia)	1972–73	1979–80	47	2327	101*	30.22	1	16	0	0/1	–	0	0	34	0	
259	Bruce Laird	(Australia)	1972–73	1983–84	64	3824	171	36.76	7	23	0	0/50	–	0	0	61	0	
260	Graham House	(Australia)	1972–73	1973–74	4	87	70*	29.00	0	1	6	2/5	36.00	0	0	2	0	
261	Dennis Baker	(Australia)	1972–73	1981–82	17	194	50	13.85	0	1	44	4/63	28.52	0	0	9	0	
262	Dennis Yagmich	(Australia)	1972–73	1973–74	4	14	11*	–	0	0	–	–	–	–	–	24	1	
263	George Young	(Australia)	1972–73	1972–73	2	154	125	51.33	1	0	–	–	–	–	–	4	0	
264	Bob Paulsen	(Australia)	1973–74	1978–79	31	405	46	17.60	0	0	81	8/71	33.18	3	0	14	0	
265	Wally Edwards	(Australia)	1973–74	1977–78	22	1313	153	33.66	2	9	2	1/11	70.50	0	0	16	0	
266	Rob Langer	(Australia)	1973–74	1981–82	44	2756	150*	43.06	5	18	5	1/14	39.00	0	0	19	0	
267	Terry Alderman	(Australia)	1974–75	1992–93	110	559	26*	7.16	0	0	433	7/28	24.13	20	4	87	0	
268	Kevin Wright	(Australia)	1974–75	1979–80	31	826	88*	28.48	0	4	–	–	–	–	–	117	10	
269	Wayne Clark	(Australia)	1974–75	1984–85	49	604	46*	16.77	0	0	150	6/39	30.94	4	0	16	0	
270	Mick Malone	(Australia)	1974–75	1981–82	42	635	46	17.63	0	0	163	6/33	24.90	7	0	25	0	
271	Kim Hughes	(Australia)	1975–76	1988–89	66	4587	183	42.08	13	22	0	0/9	–	0	0	39	0	
272	Steve Jones	(Australia)	1975–76	1975–76	1	38	36	19.00	0	0	1	1/88	108.00	0	0	2	0	
273	Craig Serjeant	(Australia)	1976–77	1982–83	51	2631	144*	37.58	6	12	0	0/4	–	0	0	69	0	
274	Tom Mullooly	(Australia)	1976–77	1976–77	1	5	5	5.00	0	0	1	1/39	77.00	0	0	2	0	
275	Trevor Chappell	(Australia)	1976–77	1976–77	4	160	57	40.00	0	2	0	0/5	–	0	0	2	0	
276	Graeme Wood	(Australia)	1976–77	1991–92	125	7960	186*	46.27	24	35	2	1/0	60.00	0	0	89	0	
277	Kim Hagdorn	(Australia)	1977–78	1977–78	1	–	–	–	–	–	0	0/2	–	0	0	0	0	
278	Geoff Marsh	(Australia)	1977–78	1993–94	112	7736	355*	42.27	24	29	1	1/1	9.00	0	0	71	0	
279	Graeme Porter	(Australia)	1977–78	1985–86	26	636	64	21.93	0	4	51	4/59	29.11	0	0	16	0	
280	Gregory Colgan	(Australia)	1977–78	1977–78	1	1	1	1.00	0	0	2	2/68	43.50	0	0	0	0	
281	Phil O'Meara	(Australia)	1977–78	1977–78	1	29	20	14.50	0	0	–	–	–	–	–	2	0	
282	Greg Shipperd	(Australia)	1977–78	1987–88	68	4450	167*	44.05	10	22	0	0/13	–	0	0	44	0	
283	Kevin Prindiville	(Australia)	1978–79	1978–79	3	108	78	21.60	0	1	0	0/0	–	0	0	6	0	
284	Mervyn Sayers	(Australia)	1978–79	1978–79	1	–	–	–	–	–	–	–	–	–	–	5	0	
285	Mark O'Neill	(Australia)	1979–80	1981–82	18	655	100	21.83	1	3	2	1/29	127.00	0	0	4	0	
286	Ken McEwan	(South Africa)	1979–80	1980–81	18	1093	177	35.25	2	6	0	0/8	–	0	0	9	0	
287	Colin Penter	(Australia)	1979–80	1980–81	8	286	112	35.25	1	1	5	1/25	101.40	0	0	5	0	
288	Con Michael	(Australia)	1979–80	1979–80	3	1	1*	1.00	0	0	9	3/75	26.77	0	0	1	0	
289	Greg Watson	(Australia)	1979–80	1979–80	1	–	–	–	–	–	2	2/74	67.50	0	0	1	0	
290	Tim Zoehrer	(Australia)	1980–81	1993–94	117	4577	168	31.13	7	24	23	5/58	61.56	1	0	365	30	
291	Ken MacLeay	(Australia)	1980–81	1991–92	100	2870	114*	27.33	3	14	261	6/93	29.71	6	0	65	0	
292	Wayne Daniel	(Barbados)	1981–82	1981–82	2	23	21	11.50	0	0	1	1/66	180.00	0	0	1	0	
293	Tom Hogan	(Australia)	1981–82	1990–91	56	1217	115*	19.62	1	4	148	6/57	35.91	6	0	36	0	
294	David Boyd	(Australia)	1981–82	1983–84	12	246	43*	18.92	0	0	25	3/40	41.24	0	0	5	0	
295	Robert McFarlane	(Australia)	1981–82	1981–82	2	51	22	12.75	0	0	–	–	–	–	–	4	0	
296	Shane Clements	(Australia)	1981–82	1984–85	20	1114	151	34.81	1	8	0	0/4	–	0	0	15	0	
297	Geoff Millar	(Australia)	1981–82	1981–82	1	20	20	20.00	0	0	0	0/37	–	0	0	0	0	
298	Malcolm Wolfe	(Australia)	1982–83	1982–83	1	39	39	39.00	0	0	0	0/6	–	0	0	1	0	
299	Geoff Thomson	(Australia)	1982–83	1982–83	1	0	0	0.00	0	0	0	0/33	–	0	0	0	0	
300	Wayne Andrews	(Australia)	1982–83	1992–93	91	4684	139	37.17	5	32	40	3/43	39.52	0	0	71	0	
301	Mike Veletta	(Australia)	1983–84	1994–95	127	8033	262	41.19	19	46	0	0/12	–	0	0	158	2	
302	Shaun Graf	(Australia)	1983–84	1983–84	11	420	74	35.00	0	3	32	3/34	32.75	0	0	10	0	
303	Bret Mulder	(Australia)	1983–84	1998–99	25	101	25*	8.41	0	0	59	6/65	35.79	3	1	14	0	
304	Wayne Hill	(Australia)	1983–84	1984–85	8	83	31*	10.37	0	0	0	0/0	–	0	0	23	0	
305	Steve Milosz	(Australia)	1983–84	1987–88	10	18	8	6.00	0	0	17	4/53	44.64	0	0	4	0	
306	Mark McPhee	(Australia)	1984–85	1993–94	40	1699	135	27.85	2	9	0	0/0	–	0	0	16	0	
307	Peter Clough	(Australia)	1984–85	1985–86	8	56	25	9.33	0	0	24	4/49	34.62	0	0	0	0	
308	Robert Gartrell	(Australia)	1984–85	1985–86	7	400	104	36.36	1	1	0	0/3	–	0	0	2	0	
309	Chris Matthews	(Australia)	1984–85	1990–91	52	1309	71	22.56	0	7	225	8/101	23.69	14	0	17	0	
310	Peter Gonnella	(Australia)	1984–85	1988–89	19	878	134	31.35	1	3	0	0/4	–	0	0	12	0	
311	Darryl Smith	(Australia)	1984–85	1984–85	1	2	2	1.00	0	0	2	2/29	14.50	0	0	1	0	
312	Giles Bush	(Australia)	1984–85	1990–91	9	73	27	7.30	0	0	17	3/31	46.58	0	0	6	0	
313	Bruce Reid	(Australia)	1984–85	1995–96	56	303	30	8.41	0	0	197	6/54	28.29	7	1	14	0	
314	Earl Spalding	(Australia)	1984–85	1984–85	4	0	0*	0.00	0	0	12	4/37	25.66	0	0	0	0	
315	Gary Ireland	(Australia)	1984–85	1985–86	8	151	50	16.77	0	1	–	–	–	–	–	6	0	
316	Tom Moody	(Australia)	1985–86	2000–01	145	9520	272	42.31	21	49	232	7/38	28.40	5	1	125	0	
317	Todd Breman	(Australia)	1985–86	1987–88	10	203	45*	18.45	0	0	22	6/76	30.31	1	0	4	0	
318	Peter Capes	(Australia)	1985–86	1992–93	40	329	23	10.28	0	0	124	6/92	31.66	4	1	8	0	
319	Michael Cox	(Australia)	1985–86	1986–87	7	97	31	12.12	0	0	–	–	–	–	–	23	2	
320	Vic Marks	(England)	1986–87	1986–87	11	370	66*	46.25	0	2	30	5/55	31.83	1	0	7	0	
321	Jamie Brayshaw	(Australia)	1987–88	1990–91	18	633	81	28.77	0	4	2	1/13	100.50	0	0	14	0	
322	Alan Mullally	(England)	1987–88	1989–90	15	64	34	8.00	0	0	37	4/71	42.05	0	0	4	0	
323	Ken Lilly	(Australia)	1988–89	1988–89	2	4	4*	4.00	0	0	6	3/72	42.50	0	0	0	0	
324	Darrin Ramshaw	(Australia)	1989–90	1989–90	3	61	44	15.25	0	0	–	–	–	–	–	1	0	
325	Steve Russell	(Australia)	1989–90	1993–94	4	68	23	17.00	0	0	6	3/10	45.83	0	0	3	0	
326	Brendon Julian	(Australia)	1989–90	2000–01	92	2650	124	23.24	2	12	306	7/39	29.57	16	2	62	0	
327	Chris Mack	(Australia)	1989–90	1990–91	9	14	8	2.33	0	0	22	4/72	45.00	0	0	1	0	
328	Damien Martyn	(Australia)	1990–91	2006–07	104	7329	203*	43.88	20	37	33	4/30	38.96	0	0	100	1	
329	Clint Auty	(Australia)	1990–91	1990–91	2	25	17*	8.33	0	0	0	0/11	–	0	0	1	0	
330	Mark Lavender	(Australia)	1990–91	1997–98	51	3071	173*	34.50	6	14	0	0/15	–	0	0	45	0	
331	Mark Wasley	(Australia)	1990–91	1990–91	2	19	12	9.50	0	0	3	2/53	60.33	0	0	0	0	
332	Martin McCague	(England) (Northern Ireland)	1990–91	1991–92	11	124	34	12.40	0	0	32	5/105	33.93	1	0	7	0	
333	Doug Harris	(Australia)	1990–91	1990–91	1	23	23	11.50	0	0	–	–	–	–	–	1	0	
334	Craig Coulson	(Australia)	1990–91	1995–96	11	178	32*	12.71	0	0	31	3/48	37.54	0	0	8	0	
335	Jo Angel	(Australia)	1991–92	2003–04	110	1260	84*	12.00	0	4	445	6/35	24.58	16	1	23	0	
336	Justin Langer	(Australia)	1991–92	2007–08	118	9951	274*	51.03	29	39	0	0/52	–	0	0	119	0	
337	Steven Herzberg	(England)	1991–92	1992–93	2	76	57*	38.00	0	1	6	3/33	31.50	0	0	1	0	
338	Mark Atkinson	(Australia)	1992–93	1998–99	21	423	52*	21.15	0	1	54	5/92	35.61	1	0	13	0	
339	Rob Kelly	(Australia)	1992–93	1992–93	3	94	34	18.80	0	0	–	–	–	–	–	2	0	
340	Jamie Stewart	(Australia)	1992–93	1997–98	18	200	51	10.52	0	1	35	4/121	49.97	0	0	7	0	
341	Duncan Spencer	(England)	1993–94	1993–94	8	75	38	10.71	0	0	20	4/85	37.50	0	0	7	0	
342	Warren Wishart	(Australia)	1993–94	1993–94	7	31	15*	6.20	0	0	11	4/90	50.09	0	0	2	0	
343	David Fitzgerald	(Australia)	1993–94	1994–95	4	110	35	36.66	0	0	–	–	–	–	–	6	0	
344	Brad Hogg	(Australia)	1993–94	2007–08	76	3050	111*	32.44	3	19	129	6/44	38.62	8	0	46	0	
345	Stuart MacGill	(Australia)	1993–94	1993–94	1	11	9	11.00	0	0	0	0/91	–	0	0	0	0	
346	Murray Goodwin	(Zimbabwe)	1994–95	2004–05	62	4308	201*	41.02	10	21	0	0/2	–	0	0	42	0	
347	Adam Gilchrist	(Australia)	1994–95	2007–08	59	3339	203*	41.73	9	13	–	–	–	–	–	284	8	
348	Sean Cary	(Australia)	1994–95	2001–02	39	178	13	8.47	0	0	102	4/9	36.01	0	0	14	0	
349	Michael Hussey	(Australia)	1994–95	2012–13	121	8685	223*	41.35	18	44	16	3/34	35.56	0	0	122	0	
350	Kade Harvey	(Australia)	1994–95	2004–05	26	661	100*	22.79	1	1	58	4/43	36.41	0	0	16	0	
351	Brad Oldroyd	(Australia)	1995–96	2000–01	29	285	47	10.55	0	0	56	4/68	39.37	0	0	6	0	
352	Rob Baker	(Australia)	1995–96	1999–00	29	1252	111*	27.82	1	5	18	2/26	45.22	0	0	24	0	
353	Matthew Nicholson	(Australia)	1996–97	2002–03	40	1165	101*	23.77	1	3	142	7/77	29.09	5	0	20	0	
354	Ryan Campbell	(Australia)	1996–97	2005–06	92	5766	203	36.96	11	36	0	0/30	–	0	0	248	13	
355	Jeremy Allen	(Australia)	1996–97	1996–97	1	30	30	30.00	0	0	0	0/22	–	0	0	0	0	
356	Matt Garnaut	(Australia)	1996–97	1997–98	16	57	10*	4.75	0	0	37	4/51	42.00	0	0	6	0	
357	Simon Katich	(Australia)	1996–97	2001–02	50	3847	228*	49.96	12	18	11	3/46	50.00	0	0	45	0	
358	Matt Mason	(Australia) (Republic of Ireland)	1996–97	1997–98	3	10	3	2.50	0	0	4	2/60	62.25	0	0	1	0	
359	Michael Dighton	(Australia)	1997–98	1999–00	11	605	182*	35.58	1	2	–	–	–	–	–	15	0	
360	Chris Rogers	(Australia)	1998–99	2007–08	70	5745	279	47.47	17	26	0	0/21	–	0	0	67	0	
361	Shane Jurgensen	(Australia)	1998–99	1998–99	2	16	13*	–	0	0	2	1/26	111.50	0	0	1	0	
362	Mark Walsh	(Australia)	1998–99	2000–01	12	293	50	17.23	0	2	–	–	–	–	–	47	4	
363	Steve Nikitaras	(Australia)	1998–99	2000–01	2	11	10*	11.00	0	0	2	1/25	74.50	0	0	0	0	
364	Marcus North	(Australia)	1999–00	2013–14	117	7679	239*	40.41	21	37	85	4/82	41.64	0	0	90	0	
365	Brad Williams	(Australia)	1999–00	2005–06	36	370	28	10.57	0	0	139	6/74	28.77	7	0	9	0	
366	Darren Wates	(Australia)	1999–00	2007–08	15	491	99	35.07	0	3	35	4/77	39.94	0	0	6	0	
367	Gavin Swan	(Australia)	1999–00	2001–02	11	8	8	1.60	0	3	28	5/54	39.96	1	0	6	0	
368	Stuart Karppinen	(Australia)	2000–01	2002–03	3	22	17	5.50	0	0	11	4/110	29.45	0	0	0	0	
369	Shaun Marsh*	(Australia)	2000–01	2015–16	91	5609	166*	39.22	12	28	2	2/20	74.00	0	0	93	0	
370	Scott Meuleman	(Australia)	2000–01	2004–05	19	742	109	21.82	2	3	2	1/38	49.00	0	0	10	0	
371	Geoff Cullen	(Australia)	2000–01	2000–01	1	6	5	5.00	0	0	–	–	–	–	–	0	0	
372	Michael Clark	(Australia)	2000–01	2004–05	16	135	26	11.25	0	0	46	5/47	28.19	1	0	11	0	
373	Paul Wilson	(Australia)	2002–03	2003–04	11	73	23	12.16	0	0	26	6/76	35.50	1	0	2	0	
374	Adam Voges*	(Australia)	2002–03	2015–16	106	7452	249	46.28	20	34	40	4/92	36.05	0	0	156	0	
375	Luke Ronchi	(Australia) (New Zealand)	2002–03	2011–12	57	2777	148	32.67	5	13	–	–	–	–	–	214	10	
376	Beau Casson	(Australia)	2002–03	2005–06	24	592	51	17.41	0	1	71	6/64	39.38	3	1	9	0	
377	Callum Thorp	(Australia)	2002–03	2003–04	6	66	26	8.25	0	0	10	3/59	53.10	0	0	2	0	
378	Peter Worthington	(Australia)	2002–03	2004–05	7	250	73	20.83	0	2	15	6/59	38.53	1	0	8	0	
379	John Taylor	(Australia)	2003–04	2003–04	6	132	50	18.85	0	1	12	4/70	51.25	0	0	3	0	
380	Craig Simmons	(Australia)	2003–04	2011–12	4	87	60	12.42	0	1	1	1/37	72.00	0	0	2	0	
381	Ben Edmondson	(Australia)	2003–04	2009–10	46	107	15*	3.96	0	0	168	7/95	31.88	3	1	13	0	
382	Michael Thistle	(Australia)	2003–04	2003–04	1	14	14	7.00	0	0	0	0/103	–	0	0	0	0	
383	Aaron Heal	(Australia)	2003–04	2010–11	20	439	81*	20.90	0	4	36	5/57	51.05	2	1	7	0	
384	Steve Magoffin	(Australia)	2004–05	2010–11	59	1182	79	19.70	0	4	199	8/47	26.85	7	1	17	0	
385	Brett Dorey	(Australia)	2004–05	2010–11	43	805	53	15.48	0	1	163	7/86	25.71	9	1	18	0	
386	Mathew Inness	(Australia)	2005–06	2007–08	14	130	29*	10.83	0	0	52	6/83	25.75	3	0	6	0	
387	David Bandy	(Australia)	2005–06	2010–11	26	1172	88	29.30	0	8	36	7/44	27.88	1	0	18	0	
388	Clint Heron	(Zimbabwe)	2005–06	2006–07	6	307	84	27.90	0	4	–	–	–	–	–	6	0	
389	Shawn Gillies	(Australia)	2005–06	2006–07	3	70	21	17.50	0	0	6	3/41	28.83	0	0	1	0	
390	Matthew Petrie	(Australia)	2005–06	2005–06	1	4	4*	4.00	0	0	1	1/59	88.00	0	0	0	0	
391	Sean Ervine	(Zimbabwe)	2006–07	2006–07	2	4	4	2.00	0	0	4	2/26	27.75	0	0	0	0	
392	Tim Macdonald	(Australia)	2006–07	2006–07	1	17	17	17.00	0	0	0	0/81	–	0	0	1	0	
393	Luke Pomersbach	(Australia)	2006–07	2010–11	30	2111	176	40.59	4	16	5	1/4	26.80	0	0	36	0	
394	Danny McLauchlan	(Australia)	2006–07	2006–07	2	25	20*	12.50	0	0	8	4/76	22.00	0	0	0	0	
395	Trent Kelly	(Australia)	2007–08	2008–09	5	32	26	10.66	0	0	6	2/24	63.16	0	0	1	0	
396	Liam Davis	(Australia)	2007–08	2012–13	36	2190	303*	31.73	4	7	1	1/6	6.00	0	0	27	0	
397	Theo Doropoulos	(Australia)	2007–08	2009–10	8	276	65	23.00	0	2	4	2/16	36.50	0	0	6	0	
398	Arron Crawford	(Australia)	2008–09	2008–09	3	8	6*	–	0	0	7	3/36	31.85	0	0	2	0	
399	Wes Robinson	(Australia)	2008–09	2011–12	35	2254	141	34.67	2	15	6	2/26	39.83	0	0	17	0	
400	Paul Davis	(Australia)	2008–09	2008–09	1	39	37	39.00	0	0	4	3/48	24.75	0	0	0	0	
401	Josh Mangan	(Australia)	2008–09	2009–10	4	115	38	23.00	0	0	3	2/102	79.33	0	0	2	0	
402	Marcus Stoinis	(Australia)	2008–09	2009–10	3	74	27	12.33	0	0	–	–	–	–	–	1	0	
403	Luke Towers	(Australia)	2008–09	2013–14	13	452	124	18.08	1	0	–	–	–	–	–	5	0	
404	Drew Porter	(Australia)	2008–09	2011–12	5	62	18*	7.75	0	0	10	2/27	45.60	0	0	5	0	
405	Michael Johnson	(Australia)	2008–09	2011–12	10	200	53	12.50	0	1	–	–	–	–	–	34	2	
406	Brad Knowles	(Australia)	2008–09	2009–10	8	118	36	16.85	0	0	32	4/32	26.09	0	0	1	0	
407	Ashley Noffke	(Australia)	2009–10	2010–11	7	258	61	28.66	0	2	12	4/105	55.25	0	0	3	0	
408	Michael Hogan*	(Australia)	2009–10	2015–16	61	810	47*	15.88	0	0	224	6/70	27.06	6	0	34	0	
409	Mitch Marsh*	(Australia)	2009–10	2015–16	34	1444	111	26.25	1	10	50	6/84	26.90	1	0	20	0	
410	Justin Coetzee	(Australia)	2009–10	2009–10	1	16	15	8.00	0	0	2	1/18	27.50	0	0	1	0	
411	Michael Swart	(Australia) (Netherlands)	2009–10	2010–11	9	492	104	28.94	1	3	2	1/0	36.50	0	0	3	0	
412	Nathan Coulter-Nile*	(Australia)	2009–10	2015–16	31	810	64	17.60	0	2	112	6/84	28.21	2	0	22	0	
413	Matt Johnston	(Australia)	2009–10	2009–10	1	44	44	22.00	0	0	1	1/17	20.00	0	0	0	0	
414	Michael Beer	(Australia)	2010–11	2013–14	24	282	29*	11.75	0	0	62	7/46	37.74	1	0	14	0	
415	Ryan Duffield	(Australia)	2010–11	2014–15	17	245	36	10.65	0	0	67	6/77	28.86	1	0	8	0	
416	Mitchell Johnson*	(Australia)	2010–11	2015–16	10	343	121*	26.38	1	0	42	5/35	26.19	2	0	3	0	
417	Marcus Harris*	(Australia)	2010–11	2015–16	41	2047	158*	28.43	4	5	0	0/0	–	0	0	21	0	
418	Tom Beaton*	(Australia)	2010–11	2015–16	12	345	72*	17.25	0	1	2	1/15	60.00	0	0	9	0	
419	Matt Dixon*	(Australia)	2010–11	2011–12	4	33	22	8.25	0	0	7	3/74	54.42	0	0	1	0	
420	Travis Birt	(Australia)	2011–12	2012–13	9	365	63	26.07	0	3	0	0/33	–	0	0	4	0	
421	Nathan Rimmington*	(Australia)	2011–12	2015–16	26	514	102*	18.35	1	0	92	5/27	24.76	3	0	9	0	
422	Jason Behrendorff*	(Australia)	2011–12	2015–16	21	215	29	10.23	0	0	86	7/70	24.38	3	1	9	0	
423	Tom Triffitt	(Australia)	2012–13	2012–13	5	295	85	29.50	0	2	–	–	–	–	–	16	0	
424	Sam Whiteman*	(Australia)	2012–13	2015–16	39	1853	120	34.96	1	12	–	–	–	–	–	131	3	
425	John Rogers	(Australia)	2012–13	2013–14	10	446	95	23.47	0	2	0	0/4	–	0	0	12	0	
426	Hilton Cartwright*	(Australia)	2012–13	2015–16	9	439	139	48.77	1	2	10	3/61	29.70	0	0	3	0	
427	Ashton Agar*	(Australia)	2012–13	2015–16	31	1077	106	26.92	1	6	80	5/65	42.05	4	1	13	0	
428	Burt Cockley	(Australia)	2012–13	2012–13	3	18	11*	3.60	0	0	14	4/50	23.57	0	0	0	0	
429	Cameron Bancroft*	(Australia)	2013–14	2015–16	32	2078	211	37.78	6	5	0	–	–	0	0	40	1	
430	Will Bosisto*	(Australia)	2013–14	2015–16	9	287	108*	20.50	1	0	7	2/28	44.71	0	0	7	0	
431	Ashton Turner*	(Australia)	2013–14	2015–16	11	377	96	23.56	0	1	3	2/23	53.33	0	0	6	0	
432	Simon Mackin*	(Australia)	2013–14	2015–16	11	30	11*	3.75	0	0	34	4/64	26.52	0	0	7	0	
433	Michael Klinger*	(Australia)	2014–15	2015–16	21	1663	202*	53.65	6	6	–	–	–	–	–	7	0	
434	Andrew Tye*	(Australia)	2014–15	2015–16	7	33	10	4.71	0	0	21	3/47	33.80	0	0	1	0	
435	David Moody*	(Australia)	2014–15	2015–16	9	49	22	8.16	0	0	28	4/60	40.39	0	0	2	0	
436	Joel Paris*	(Australia)	2015–16	2015–16	6	98	31	16.33	0	0	35	6/23	19.57	2	0	4	0	
437	Jonathan Wells	(Australia)	2015–16	2015–16	2	51	18*	17.00	0	0	–	–	–	–	–	1	0	
438	Josh Nicholas	(Australia)	2015–16	2015–16	2	120	68*	60.00	0	1	6	2/17	23.33	0	0	2	0	
439	Jhye Richardson*	(Australia)	2015–16	2015–16	1	22	22	22.00	0	0	4	3/25	23.25	0	0	1	0	
440	D'Arcy Short	(Australia)	2016–17															
441	Josh Inglis	(Australia)	2016–17															
442	Cameron Green	(Australia)	2016–17															
443	Matthew Kelly	(Australia)	2017–18															
444	Andrew Holder	(Australia)	2017–18															
445	Alex Bevilaqua	(Australia)	2017–18															
446	Liam Guthrie	(Australia)	2017–18															
447	Clint Hinchliffe	(Australia)	2017–18															
448	Josh Philippe	(Australia)	2017–18															
449	Usman Qadir	(Pakistan)	2018–19															
450	Bradley Hope	(Australia)	2018–19															
451	Liam O'Connor	(Australia)	2018–19															
452	Aaron Hardie	(Australia)	2018–19															
453	Jake Carder	(Australia)	2019–20															
454	Cameron Gannon	(United States)	2020–21															
455	Lance Morris	(Australia)	2020–21															
456	Corey Rocchiccioli	(Australia)	2021–22															
457	Jayden Goodwin	(Australia)	2021–22															
458	Sam Fanning	(Australia)	2022–23															
459	Charlie Stobo	(Australia)	2022–23															
460	Liam Haskett	(Australia)	2023–24															
461	Hamish McKenzie	(Australia)	2023–24															
462	Joel Curtis	(Australia)	2023–24															
463	Cooper Connolly	(Australia)	2023–24															
464	Brody Couch	(Australia)	2024–25															

== See also ==
- List of Western Australia List A cricketers
- List of Western Australia Twenty20 cricketers
