= Peter Wishart =

Peter Wishart could refer to:

- Pete Wishart (born 1962), Scottish politician and musician
- Peter Wishart (composer) (1921-1984), English composer
- Peter Wishart (cricketer) (born 1937), Australian cricketer
