= Bidstrup =

Bidstup may refer to:

== Surname ==
- Alix Bidstrup (b. 1983), Australian actress
- Graham Bidstrup (born 1952), Australian musician, songwriter, music producer and artist manager
- Herluf Bidstrup (1912–1988), Danish cartoonist and artist
- Hjalte Bidstrup (born 2006), Danish footballer
- Jane Bidstrup (born 1955), Danish curler
- Lene Bidstrup (born 1966), Danish curler
- Mads Bidstrup (born 2001), Danish footballer
- Mathias Bidstrup (1852–1929), Danish architect
- Stefan Bidstrup (born 1975), Danish footballer
- Trevor Bidstrup (1937–2022), Australian cricketer

== Other ==
- 3246 Bidstrup, main-belt asteroid
