= Tom Coyne =

Tom Coyne may refer to:

- Tom Coyne (writer), American writer and professor
- Tom Coyne (broadcaster) (1930–2015), British television presenter
- Tom Coyne (music engineer) (1954–2017), American mastering engineer
- Thomas Coyne (cricketer) (1873–1955), Australian cricketer
- Tommy Coyne (born 1962), Irish footballer
