= Henry Gregg =

Henry Gregg may refer to:

- Henry Gregg (footballer) (1932 – 2020), Northern Irish footballer a.k.a. Harry
- Henry Gregg (barrister) (c. 1759 – 1826), British barrister
- Henry Gregg, husband of Mary Gregg

== See also ==
- Henry Grigg, cricketer
- Gregg Henry, actor and musician
