= Harold Lang =

Harold Lang may refer to:

- Harold Lang (cricketer) (1905–1991), Australian cricketer
- Harold Lang (dancer) (1920–1985), American dancer, singer and actor
- Harold Lang (British actor) (1923–1970), British character actor
