= Ernest Harvey =

Ernest Harvey may refer to:

- Ernest Harvey of the Harvey baronets
- Ernest Harvey (cricketer) (1880–1923), Australian cricketer
- Ernest Musgrave Harvey, chief cashier of the Bank of England
- Ernest Harvey (footballer), English footballer
