= William Lockwood (Australian cricketer) =

Australian cricketer (1868–1953)

Personal information
- Full name: William Thomas Lockwood
- Born: 26 June 1868; Geelong, Victoria
- Died: 29 August 1953 (aged 85); Tuart Hill, Western Australia, Australia
- Role: Batsman

Domestic team information
- Years: Team
- 1899: Western Australia

Career statistics
Competition	FC
Matches	1
Runs scored	21
Batting average	10.50
100s/50s	0/0
Top score	21
Catches/stumpings	0/-
- Source: CricketArchive, 7 January 2013

William Thomas Lockwood (26 June 1868 – 29 August 1953) was an Australian cricketer who played a single first-class match for Western Australia during the 1898–99 season.

Born in Geelong, Victoria, Lockwood emigrated to Perth, Western Australia, sometime in the late 19th century. In grade cricket matches, he played for the West Perth Cricket Club, where he was a leading batsman. Lockwood's only match at first-class level came against South Australia, during its tour of Western Australia at the end of the 1898–99 season. In the match, played at the WACA Ground in early April 1899, Lockwood opened the batting with Arthur Hoskings in both innings, recording a duck in the first innings and 21 runs in the second innings. In the first innings, he was particularly troubled by the bowling of future Test cricketer Joe Travers, who eventually had him caught at point by Fred Hack. Lockwood's second innings produced a notable incident. He hit a ball from Robert Homburg to square leg and ran five runs, and then completed another two runs from an overthrow. He and Hoskings thus ran seven runs off a single ball, in total combining for a 39-run opening partnership before Lockwood was clean bowled trying to hit Victor Hugo.

Although not playing at state level again, Lockwood remained involved in cricket well into the early decades of the 1900s, and played in a veterans' match as late as April 1930, which included former teammate Ted Bishop. He died at the Hawthorn Hospital, in Mount Hawthorn (a suburb of Perth), in August 1953.

== See also ==
- List of Western Australia first-class cricketers
