= John Stubbs (cricketer) =

Australian cricketer (1931–2020)

Personal information
- Born: 15 October 1931; Collie, Western Australia
- Died: 14 August 2020 (aged 88)
- Batting: Right-handed
- Bowling: Legbreak
- Source: Cricinfo, 3 November 2017

John Stubbs (15 October 1931 – 14 August 2020) was an Australian cricketer. He played three first-class matches for Western Australia between 1956/57 and 1961/62.

== See also ==
- List of Western Australia first-class cricketers
