= Leslie Renfrey =

Australian cricketer

Personal information
- Born: 15 February 1893; Wallaroo, South Australia, Australia
- Died: 23 September 1958 (aged 65); Mount Lawley, Western Australia, Australia
- Batting: Right-handed
- Bowling: Right arm fast medium
- Source: Cricinfo, 18 July 2017

Leslie Renfrey (15 February 1893 – 23 September 1958) was an Australian cricketer. He played ten first-class matches for Western Australia between 1922/23 and 1927/28.

== See also ==
- List of Western Australia first-class cricketers
