= Peter Clough =

Australian cricketer

Personal information
- Full name: Peter Michael Clough
- Born: 15 August 1956 (age 70); Sydney, New South Wales, Australia
- Batting: Right-handed
- Bowling: Right-arm fast-medium

Domestic team information
- Years: Team
- 1984/85–1985/86: Western Australia
- 1980/81–1983/84: Tasmania

Career statistics
Competition	FC	LA
Matches	43	13
Runs scored	421	25
Batting average	11.69	12.50
100s/50s	–/–	–/–
Top score	34	12*
Balls bowled	8,920	712
Wickets	139	14
Bowling average	31.23	35.57
5 wickets in innings	5	–
10 wickets in match	–	–
Best bowling	8/95	3/31
Catches/stumpings	12/–	2/–
- Source: Cricinfo, 3 January 2011

Peter Michael Clough (born 17 August 1956 in Sydney, New South Wales) was an Australian cricketer, who played for Tasmania and Western Australia.

He was a right-handed batsman and right arm fast-medium bowler who represented Tasmania from 1980 until 1984, and played for Western Australia until 1986. He was a useful bowler, who could be relied upon for Tasmania, at time when the struggling state side was trying to establish itself as a competitive team. In 1984, Clough took the best bowling figures for Tasmania in the Sheffield Shield, a record that stood until March 2022.

His gritty bowling performances for Tasmania in the dark period of the early 1980s saw him added as a member of the state's elite Cricket Hall of Fame.

== See also ==
- List of Tasmanian representative cricketers
- List of Western Australia first-class cricketers
