= Victor Jones (cricketer) =

Australian cricketer

Personal information
- Born: 11 May 1881; Bairnsdale, Australia
- Died: 20 July 1923 (aged 42); Mount Lawley, Australia
- Source: Cricinfo, 13 July 2017

Victor Jones (11 May 1881 – 20 July 1923) was an Australian cricketer. He played his only first-class match for Western Australia in 1905/06.

== See also ==
- List of Western Australia first-class cricketers
