= Hubba Read =

Australian cricketer

Personal information
- Born: 26 May 1908; Adelaide, South Australia
- Died: 1 March 2001 (aged 92); Perth, Western Australia
- Source: Cricinfo, 19 October 2017

Hubba Read (26 May 1908 – 1 March 2001) was an Australian cricketer. He played three first-class matches for Western Australia in 1938/39 and 1939/40.

== See also ==
- List of Western Australia first-class cricketers
