= Harold Evers =

Australian cricketer

Personal information
- Full name: Harold Albert Evers
- Born: 18 February 1876; Sydney, Australia
- Died: 6 February 1937 (aged 60); Perth, Australia
- Source: ESPNcricinfo, 26 December 2016

Harold Evers (18 February 1876 – 6 February 1937) was an Australian cricketer. He played nineteen first-class matches for New South Wales and Western Australia between 1896/97 and 1920/21.

== See also ==
- List of New South Wales representative cricketers
- List of Western Australia first-class cricketers
