= John Shea (cricketer) =

Australian cricketer

Personal information
- Born: 8 May 1913; Boulder, Western Australia
- Died: 7 February 1986 (aged 72); Claremont, Western Australia
- Batting: Right-handed
- Bowling: Legbreak
- Source: Cricinfo, 19 October 2017

John Shea (8 May 1913 – 7 February 1986) was an Australian cricketer. He played five first-class matches for Western Australia between 1936/37 and 1945/46.

== See also ==
- List of Western Australia first-class cricketers
