= William McRae (cricketer) =

Australian cricketer

Personal information
- Born: 18 June 1904; Geelong, Victoria
- Died: 25 July 1973 (aged 69); Subiaco, Western Australia
- Source: Cricinfo, 26 September 2017

William McRae (18 June 1904 – 25 July 1973) was an Australian cricketer. He played four first-class matches for Western Australia in 1927/28 and 1928/29.

== See also ==
- List of Western Australia first-class cricketers
