= Theodore Hantke =

Australian cricketer

Personal information
- Born: 1 August 1875; Blinman, South Australia, Australia
- Died: 22 May 1931 (aged 55); South Perth, Western Australia, Australia
- Source: Cricinfo, 14 July 2017

Theodore Hantke (1 August 1875 – 22 May 1931) was an Australian cricketer and an Australian rules footballer. He played one first-class match for Western Australia in 1908/09.

== See also ==
- List of Western Australia first-class cricketers
