= Richard Cantwell =

Australian cricketer

Personal information
- Born: 24 October 1905; Warbleton, Sussex, England
- Died: 22 April 1956 (aged 50); Esperance, Australia
- Batting: Left-handed
- Source: Cricinfo, 22 August 2017

Richard Cantwell (24 October 1905 – 22 April 1956) was an Australian cricketer. He played his only first-class match in 1924/25, for Western Australia.

== See also ==
- List of Western Australia first-class cricketers
