= Morris Loton =

Australian cricketer

Personal information
- Born: 18 March 1905; Springhill, Australia
- Died: 2 March 1976 (aged 70); Northam, Australia
- Batting: Left-handed
- Source: Cricinfo, 22 August 2017

Morris Loton (18 March 1905 – 2 March 1976) was an Australian cricketer. He played one first-class match for Western Australia in 1924/25.

== See also ==
- List of Western Australia first-class cricketers
