= Wallace Hogue =

Australian cricketer

Personal information
- Born: 9 December 1879; Wickham, New South Wales, Australia
- Died: 1 June 1946 (aged 66); Cook's Hill, New South Wales, Australia
- Source: Cricinfo, 14 July 2017

Wallace Hogue (9 December 1879 – 1 June 1946) was an Australian cricketer. A left-handed batsman and right arm fast-medium bowler, Hogue played eight first-class matches for Western Australia between 1907/08 and 1912/13.

== See also ==
- List of Western Australia first-class cricketers
