= Ernest Keogh =

Australian cricketer (1869–1951)

Personal information
- Full name: Ernest John Keogh
- Born: 1869; Melbourne, Australia
- Died: 1951 (aged 81–82); Melbourne, Australia
- Source: Cricinfo, 13 July 2017

Ernest Keogh (1869 – 1951) was an Australian cricketer. He played one first-class match for Western Australia in 1898/99.

== See also ==
- List of Western Australia first-class cricketers
