= James Herbert (cricketer) =

Australian cricketer

Personal information
- Born: 24 April 1895; Fremantle, Australia
- Died: 21 November 1957 (aged 62); Claremont, Australia
- Source: Cricinfo, 17 July 2017

James Herbert (24 April 1895 – 21 November 1957) was an Australian cricketer. He played five first-class matches for Western Australia from 1923/24 to 1926/27.

== See also ==
- List of Western Australia first-class cricketers
