= Andrew Meek =

Australian cricketer

Personal information
- Born: 7 December 1889; Gulgong, Australia
- Died: 13 February 1957 (aged 67); Perth, Australia
- Source: Cricinfo, 14 July 2017

Andrew Meek (7 December 1889 – 13 February 1957) was an Australian cricketer. He played five first-class matches for Western Australia between 1920/21 and 1925/26. He also played for East Perth.

== See also ==
- List of Western Australia first-class cricketers
