= Harry Howard (cricketer) =

Australian cricketer

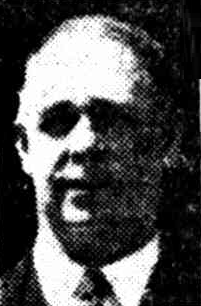

Personal information
- Full name: Harry Cecil Howard
- Born: 30 June 1885; Adelaide, Australia
- Died: 18 September 1960 (aged 75); Perth, Australia
- Source: Cricinfo, 13 July 2017

Harry Howard (30 June 1885 – 18 September 1960) was an Australian cricketer. He played twenty first-class matches for Western Australia between 1905/06 and 1924/25.

== See also ==
- List of Western Australia first-class cricketers
