= Mark Walsh (cricketer) =

Australian cricketer (born 1972)

Personal information
- Born: 28 April 1972 (age 54); Townsville, Queensland
- Source: Cricinfo, 10 November 2017

Mark Walsh (born 28 April 1972) is an Australian cricketer. He played twelve first-class matches for Western Australia between 1998/99 and 2000/01.

== See also ==
- List of Western Australia first-class cricketers
