= Leslie Mills (cricketer) =

Australian cricketer

Personal information
- Born: 14 July 1914; Kalgoorlie, Western Australia
- Died: 27 February 2000 (aged 85); Perth, Western Australia
- Source: Cricinfo, 19 October 2017

Leslie Mills (14 July 1914 – 27 February 2000) was an Australian cricketer. He played four first-class matches for Western Australia in 1937/38 and 1938/39.

== See also ==
- List of Western Australia first-class cricketers
