= Steve Jones (cricketer) =

Australian cricketer

Personal information
- Full name: Stephen Alexander Jones
- Born: 1 July 1949 (age 77); Sydney, New South Wales, Australia
- Batting: Right-handed
- Bowling: Right-arm fast-medium
- Role: Bowler

Domestic team information
- Years: Team
- 1975: Western Australia

Career statistics
Competition	FC
Matches	1
Runs scored	38
Batting average	19.00
100s/50s	0/0
Top score	36
Balls bowled	120
Wickets	1
Bowling average	108.00
5 wickets in innings	0
10 wickets in match	0
Best bowling	1/88
Catches/stumpings	2/-
- Source: CricketArchive, 5 January 2013

Stephen Alexander "Steve" Jones (born 1 July 1949) is an Australian former cricketer who played a single first-class match for Western Australia during the 1975–76 season.

Jones was born in Sydney, New South Wales. His only match at state level came against the West Indies during their 1975–76 tour of Australia. The tour match was played at the WACA Ground in December 1975, in between the first and second Test matches of the series. Jones, a right-arm fast bowler, batted tenth in Western Australia's first innings, and scored 36 runs out of a 47-run partnership for the ninth wicket with Ian Brayshaw (100*). In the West Indians' first innings, he opened the bowling with Mick Malone. He had opener Gordon Greenidge caught by Ross Edwards for three runs, finishing with innings figures of 1/88 from eleven eight-ball overs. He did not take a wicket in the West Indians' second innings, finishing with a career bowling average of 108.00. Jones' inability to break into the state Sheffield Shield team was largely due to the strength of its fast-bowling attack at the time, which included Terry Alderman, Wayne Clark, Dennis Lillee, and Malone (all of whom played international matches during their careers). He later played matches for the North Melbourne Cricket Club in the Victorian Premier Cricket competition, as well as a season for Selkirk in the Border League.

== See also ==
- List of Western Australia first-class cricketers
