= Tony Mateljan =

Australian cricketer

Personal information
- Born: 18 February 1934 (age 92); Middle Swan, Western Australia
- Source: Cricinfo, 3 November 2017

Tony Mateljan (born 18 February 1934) is an Australian cricketer. He played both his first-class matches in 1959/60, for Western Australia.

== See also ==
- List of Western Australia first-class cricketers
