= Norman Good =

Australian rules footballer and cricketer (1885–1962)

- Born: Robert Norman Scott Good; 29 March 1885; East Melbourne, Victoria
- Died: 16 June 1962 (aged 77); Camberwell, Victoria
Australian rules football career
Personal information
- Position: Defender
Playing career^{1}
Years	Club	Games (Goals)
1909	University	4 (0)
- ^{1} Playing statistics correct to the end of 1909.
- Cricket career

Cricket information
- Batting: Right-handed

Domestic team information
- Years: Team
- 1909/10: Western Australia
- FC debut: 5 March 1910 Western Australia v Victoria
- Last FC: 12 March 1910 Western Australia v Victoria

Career statistics
Competition	First-class
Matches	2
Runs scored	52
Batting average	13.00
100s/50s	0/0
Top score	48
Catches/stumpings	0/–

Robert Norman Scott Good (29 March 1885 – 16 June 1962) was an Australian sportsman who played for the Melbourne University Football Club in the Victorian Football League (VFL) and represented Western Australia as a first-class cricketer.

== Life and career ==
Norman Good was born in 1885 to Charles Edwin Good and Sarah Cowie Scott and was educated at Geelong Grammar School before studying medicine at the University of Melbourne. He was an accomplished sportsman and earned a triple blue for representing the university in rowing, cricket and football. He played district cricket for University for several seasons and made four appearances for University in the first half of the 1909 VFL season.

After graduating he served as medical officer at the Ballarat Public Hospital for a term, and then took a position as Resident Medical Officer at the Children's Hospital, Melbourne. In July 1909 he accepted a position as Resident Medical Officer at the Perth Children's Hospital, which ended his senior football career. While in Western Australia he made two appearances for Western Australia in first-class cricket.

In 1913 Norman Good married Viola Mary Frances Wettenhall and they commenced married life in Young, New South Wales. He enlisted for service as a captain with the Australian Army Medical Corps in World War I in July 1918 but the war ended before he was called up. Good played a prominent role as senior doctor in Young and took part in the sporting life of the town, taking a strong interest in the tennis and golf clubs.

In 1923 the Good family moved back to Victoria and soon settled in Geelong where he practiced medicine for over 20 years. After retirement Good moved to Mitcham in Melbourne's outer eastern suburbs. He died in 1962, survived by his wife and five children.

== See also ==
- List of Western Australia first-class cricketers
