= Arthur Lovett =

Australian cricketer

Personal information
- Born: 1 June 1920; Melbourne, Australia
- Died: 1 July 1990 (aged 70); Coffs Harbour, Australia
- Batting: Right-handed
- Bowling: Legbreak googly
- Source: Cricinfo, 7 March 2016

Arthur Lovett (1 June 1920 – 1 July 1990) was an Australian cricketer. He played first-class cricket for Tasmania and Western Australia. He was a slow bowler. He also played for South Perth, Launceston Cricket Club, and Caulfield.

== See also ==
- List of Tasmanian representative cricketers
- List of Western Australia first-class cricketers
