= William Stokes (Western Australia cricketer) =

Australian cricketer

Personal information
- Born: 28 July 1886; Geraldton, Australia
- Died: 4 October 1954 (aged 68); Perth, Australia
- Source: Cricinfo, 14 July 2017

William Stokes (28 July 1886 – 4 October 1954) was an Australian cricketer. He played eight first-class matches for Western Australia between 1921/22 and 1928/29. He was a right-handed batsman and wicketkeeper.

== See also ==
- List of Western Australia first-class cricketers
