= Warren Smith (cricketer) =

Australian cricketer (born 1941)

Personal information
- Born: 29 December 1941 (age 84); Guildford, Western Australia
- Source: Cricinfo, 6 November 2017

Warren Smith (born 29 December 1941) is an Australian cricketer. He played nine first-class matches for Western Australia in 1961/62 and 1962/63.

== See also ==
- List of Western Australia first-class cricketers
