= John Jones (cricketer) =

Australian cricketer

Personal information
- Born: 10 May 1899; Melbourne, Victoria
- Died: 14 March 1991 (aged 91); Hamilton Hill, Western Australia
- Source: Cricinfo, 27 September 2017

John Jones (10 May 1899 – 14 March 1991) was an Australian cricketer. He played ten first-class matches for Western Australia in 1933/34 and 1935/36.

== See also ==
- List of Western Australia first-class cricketers
