= Robert Hewson =

Australian cricketer

Personal information
- Born: 4 August 1893; Melbourne, Australia
- Died: 21 October 1972 (aged 79); Melbourne, Australia
- Batting: Right-handed
- Role: Wicketkeeper
- Source: Cricinfo, 22 August 2017

Robert Hewson (4 August 1893 – 21 October 1972) was an Australian cricketer. A wicketkeeper-batsman, Hewson played thirteen first-class matches for Western Australia between 1924/25 and 1931/32.

== See also ==
- List of Western Australia first-class cricketers
