= Frederick Taaffe =

Australian cricketer (1899–1964)

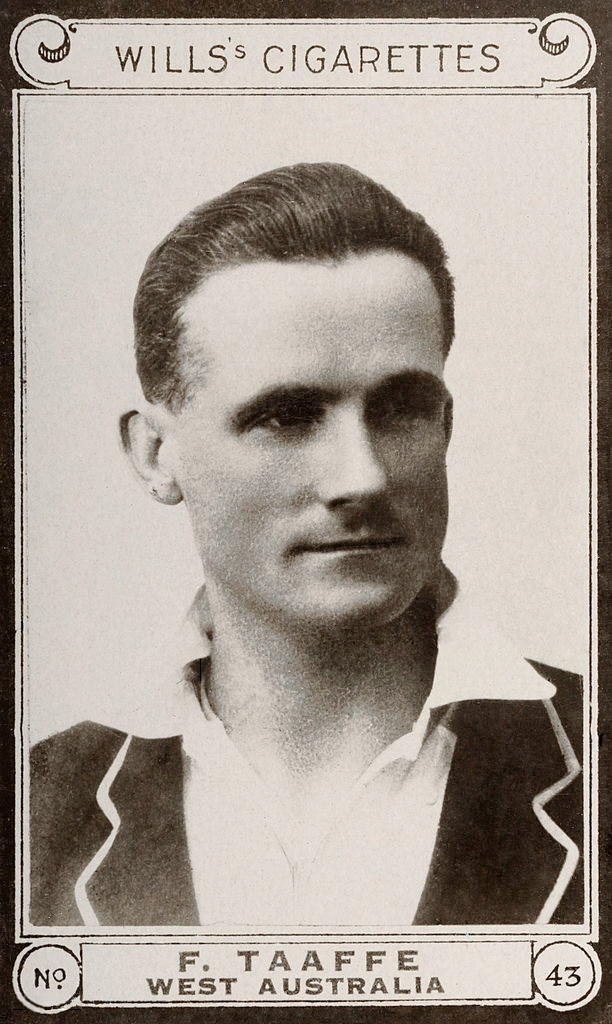

Personal information
- Born: 7 January 1899; Deolali, India
- Died: 2 April 1964 (aged 65); Ulladulla, New South Wales, Australia

Domestic team information
- Years: Team
- 1922–1937: Western Australia

Career statistics
Competition	First-class
Matches	18
Runs scored	719
Batting average	24.79
100s/50s	0/5
Top score	86
Balls bowled	376
Wickets	7
Bowling average	53.71
5 wickets in innings	1
10 wickets in match	0
Best bowling	5/89
Catches/stumpings	5/0
- Source: ESPNcricinfo, 17 July 2017

Frederick Taaffe (7 January 1899 – 2 April 1964) was an Australian cricketer. He played eighteen first-class matches for Western Australia between 1922 and 1937.

He scored 719 runs in 33 innings at an average of 24.8, with a highest score of 86*. His seven first-class wickets also included a five-wicket haul, but came at an expensive average of 53.71 apiece.

== See also ==
- List of Western Australia first-class cricketers
