= Robert Kimpton =

Australian cricketer

Personal information
- Born: 5 January 1914; Essendon, Victoria
- Died: 6 February 2007 (aged 93); Perth, Western Australia
- Source: Cricinfo, 27 September 2017

Robert Kimpton (5 January 1914 – 6 February 2007) was an Australian cricketer. He played his only first-class match in 1935/36, for Western Australia, against the Marylebone Cricket Club (MCC) side during their tour to Australia in October 1935. He was the last surviving player from the Western Australia side that played the MCC side during their 1935 tour.

== See also ==
- List of Western Australia first-class cricketers
