= Russell Waugh =

Australian cricketer (born 1941)

Personal information
- Born: 29 September 1941 (age 85); Sydney, Australia
- Batting: Right-handed
- Bowling: Legbreak
- Source: ESPNcricinfo, 6 February 2017

Russell Waugh (born 29 September 1941) is an Australian cricketer. He played fourteen first-class matches for New South Wales and Western Australia between 1960/61 and 1963/64.

== See also ==
- List of New South Wales representative cricketers
- List of Western Australia first-class cricketers
