= Henry Bovell =

Australian cricketer

Personal information
- Born: 15 March 1936 (age 90); East Fremantle, Western Australia
- Batting: Right-handed
- Source: Cricinfo, 6 November 2017

Henry Bovell (born 15 March 1936) is an Australian cricketer. He played his only first-class match for Western Australia, in 1961/62.

== See also ==
- List of Western Australia first-class cricketers
