= Kevin Gartrell =

Australian cricketer

Personal information
- Born: 4 March 1936 (age 90); Midland, Western Australia
- Batting: Left-handed
- Bowling: Right arm offbreak
- Source: Cricinfo, 3 November 2017

Kevin Boyd Gartrell OAM (born 4 March 1936) is an Australian cricketer. He played ten first-class matches for Western Australia between 1959/60 and 1962/63.

== See also ==
- List of Western Australia first-class cricketers
