= Stanley Francis =

Australian cricketer

Personal information
- Born: 14 April 1906; Geelong, Victoria
- Died: 25 January 1994 (aged 87); Nedlands, Western Australia
- Batting: Left-handed
- Bowling: Left arm Medium
- Source: Cricinfo, 27 September 2017

Stanley Francis (14 April 1906 – 25 January 1994) was an Australian cricketer. He played eight first-class matches for Western Australia between 1933/34 and 1936/37.

== See also ==
- List of Western Australia first-class cricketers
