= Theodore Anderson (cricketer) =

Australian cricketer

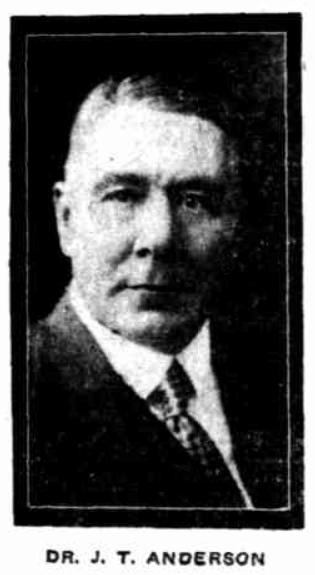

Personal information
- Full name: John Theodore Anderson
- Born: 10 August 1878; Warrnambool, Victoria, Australia
- Died: 29 August 1926 (aged 48); Melbourne, Victoria, Australia
- Source: Cricinfo, 14 July 2017

Theodore Anderson (10 August 1878 – 29 August 1926) was an Australian cricketer and psychiatrist.

Anderson played two first-class matches for Scotland in 1905 and 1906, and four for Western Australia in 1908/09 and 1909/10. He was Deputy Inspector-General of the Insane for Western Australia from 1908 to 1915, and Inspector-General of the Insane from 1915 until he resigned in 1926. He died suddenly of pneumonia in Melbourne the following week.

== See also ==
- List of Western Australia first-class cricketers
