= Henry Newman (cricketer) =

Australian cricketer

Personal information
- Born: 13 March 1907; Fremantle, Western Australia
- Died: 23 April 1988 (aged 81); Riverton, Western Australia
- Batting: Right-handed
- Bowling: Right arm fast medium
- Source: Cricinfo, 26 September 2017

Henry Newman (13 March 1907 – 23 April 1988) was an Australian cricketer. He played three first-class matches for Western Australia between 1927/28 and 1931/32.

== See also ==
- List of Western Australia first-class cricketers
