= Bobby Selk =

Australian cricketer

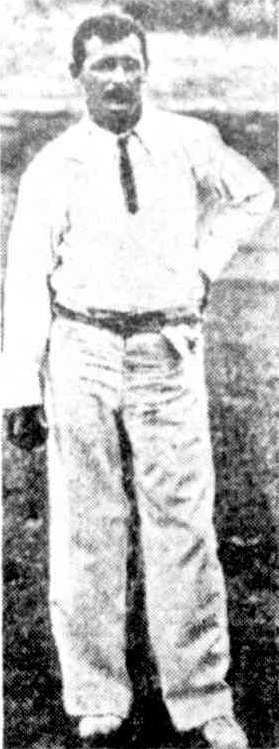

Personal information
- Full name: Rudolph Albert Selk
- Born: 6 October 1871; Omeo, Victoria, Australia
- Died: 31 January 1940 (aged 68); Pickering Brook, Western Australia
- Batting: Right-handed
- Bowling: Right-arm medium-pace off-spin
- Role: Bowler

Domestic team information
- Years: Team
- 1898-99 to 1912-13: Western Australia

Career statistics
Competition	First-class
Matches	16
Runs scored	192
Batting average	11.29
100s/50s	0/0
Top score	34
Balls bowled	3588
Wickets	75
Bowling average	24.58
5 wickets in innings	6
10 wickets in match	2
Best bowling	8/28
Catches/stumpings	6/–
- Source: Cricinfo, 23 July 2020

Rudolph "Bobby" Selk (6 October 1871 – 31 January 1940) was an Australian cricketer. He played 16 first-class matches for Western Australia between 1898–99 and 1912-13.

== Life and career ==
Bobby Selk moved from Benalla in Victoria to Western Australia during the 1895-96 cricket season, and between then and the 1910-11 season took 777 wickets in senior cricket in Perth at an average of 9.31. When he retired in 1918 he had taken 959 wickets. He was a right-arm bowler, generally bowling medium-paced off-spin: "With a big variety of paces, turning from both sides, with a fine command of length and bowling that impossible ball which 'fizzes' off the pitch and comes back from three to four inches, 'Bobby' was always likely to bowl the best of batsmen 'neck and crop' as the cricket phrase goes."

Selk took 5 for 19 and 7 for 108 when Western Australia beat South Australia in 1905-06. His best first-class performance was in Western Australia's victory over Victoria in 1909-10, when he took 8 for 28 and 5 for 49. His match figures of 13 for 77 in this match remained a West Australian record for 71 years until Terry Alderman took 14 for 87. He was named in an All-Time Western Australia XI by the Western Australian Cricket Association in 1951.

After a career in the postal service, Selk retired to an orchard property at Pickering Brook on the eastern fringes of Perth. He died there in 1940 aged 68, leaving a widow, two sons and a daughter.

== See also ==
- List of Western Australia first-class cricketers
