= Trevor Rowlands (Australian footballer) =

Australian rules footballer, born 1904

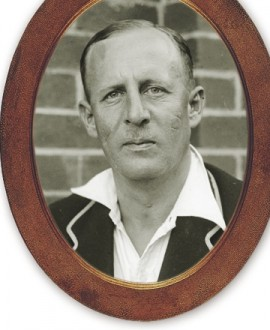

Personal information
- Full name: William Trevor Rowlands
- Born: 7 May 1904; Echuca, Victoria
- Died: 18 May 1984 (aged 80); Subiaco, Western Australia
- Original team: University Blacks
- Height: 177 cm (5 ft 10 in)
- Weight: 74 kg (163 lb)

Playing career^{1}
Years	Club	Games (Goals)
1927	Collingwood (VFL)	2 (0)
1930-1931	Perth (WAFL)	7 (10)
Total		9 (10)
- ^{1} Playing statistics correct to the end of 1931.

William Trevor Rowlands (7 May 1904 – 18 May 1984) was an Australian rules footballer who played for Collingwood in the Victorian Football League (VFL). He was also a cricketer and played six first-class matches for Western Australia in 1937/38 and 1938/39.

== Family ==
One of the seven children of Rev. Lewis Jones Rowlands (1856-1934), a Welsh-born Methodist minister, and Annie Rowlands (1864-1940), née Dixon, Trevor Rowlands was born at Echuca, Victoria, on 7 May 1904.

He married Dorothy Esther Elizabeth Solomon (1906-2006) at West Perth on 7 January 1936.

== Sports master ==
Rowlands was appointed sports master at Hale School, in Perth, Western Australia in 1930.

== Military service ==
He served in the Second AIF during World War II.

== See also ==
- List of Western Australia first-class cricketers

== Sources ==
- Holmesby, Russell; Main, Jim (2014). The Encyclopedia of AFL Footballers: every AFL/VFL player since 1897 (10th ed.). Seaford, Victoria: BAS Publishing. ISBN 978-1-921496-32-5.
- World War Two Nominal Roll: Lieutenant William Trevor Rowlands (WX19026), Department of Veterans' Affairs.
- B883, WX19026: World War Two Service Record: Lieutenant William Trevor Rowlands (WX19026), National Archives of Australia.
