= Keith Jeffreys =

Australian cricketer

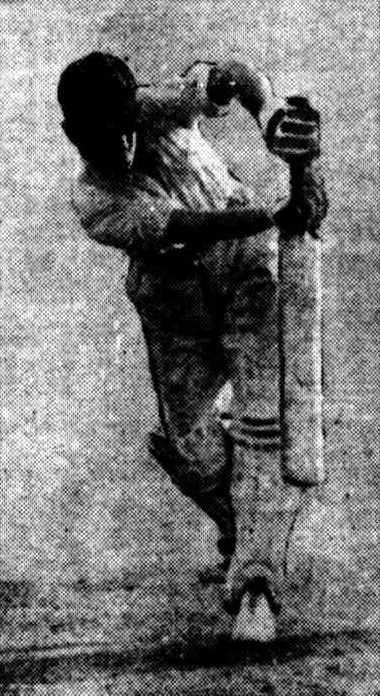

Personal information
- Born: 18 January 1921; Bridgetown, Western Australia
- Died: 16 May 2000 (aged 79)
- Source: Cricinfo, 19 October 2017

Keith Jeffreys (18 January 1921 – 16 May 2000) was an Australian cricketer. He played eight first-class matches for Western Australia from 1937/38 to 1939/40.

== See also ==
- List of Western Australia first-class cricketers
