= Harold Fidock =

Australian cricketer

Personal information
- Born: 24 August 1902; Adelaide, Australia
- Died: 9 February 1986 (aged 83); Nedlands, Australia
- Batting: Right-handed
- Bowling: Right arm fast medium
- Source: Cricinfo, 22 August 2017

Harold Fidock (24 August 1902 – 9 February 1986) was an Australian cricketer. He played three first-class matches for Western Australia between 1924/25 and 1929/30.

== See also ==
- List of Western Australia first-class cricketers
