= Walter Butler (cricketer) =

Australian cricketer

Personal information
- Born: 30 May 1882; Port Adelaide, Australia
- Died: 12 March 1966 (aged 83); Bruce Rock, Western Australia, Australia
- Source: Cricinfo, 14 July 2017

Walter Butler (30 May 1882 – 12 March 1966) was an Australian cricketer. He played his only first-class match for Western Australia in 1921/22.

== See also ==
- List of Western Australia first-class cricketers
