= Ronald Sartori =

Australian cricketer

Personal information
- Born: 23 March 1915; Fremantle, Western Australia
- Died: 1 July 1991 (aged 76); Perth, Western Australia
- Batting: Right-handed
- Bowling: Right arm fast medium
- Source: Cricinfo, 27 September 2017

Ronald Sartori (23 March 1915 – 1 July 1991) was an Australian cricketer. He played three first-class matches for Western Australia in 1933/34.

== See also ==
- List of Western Australia first-class cricketers
