= Walter Hennah =

Australian cricketer

Personal information
- Born: 16 March 1880; Ballarat, Victoria, Australia
- Died: 13 August 1946 (aged 66); Perth, Western Australia, Australia
- Source: Cricinfo, 14 July 2017

Walter Hennah (16 March 1880 – 13 August 1946) was an Australian cricketer. He played his only first-class match for Western Australia in 1909/10.

== See also ==
- List of Western Australia first-class cricketers
