= George Evans (cricketer) =

Australian cricketer

Personal information
- Born: 24 December 1915; Boulder, Western Australia
- Died: 11 April 1965 (aged 49); Hollywood, Western Australia
- Source: Cricinfo, 19 October 2017

George Evans (24 December 1915 – 11 April 1965) was an Australian cricketer. He played two first-class matches for Western Australia in 1937/38.

== See also ==
- List of Western Australia first-class cricketers
