= Leslie Freemantle =

Australian cricketer

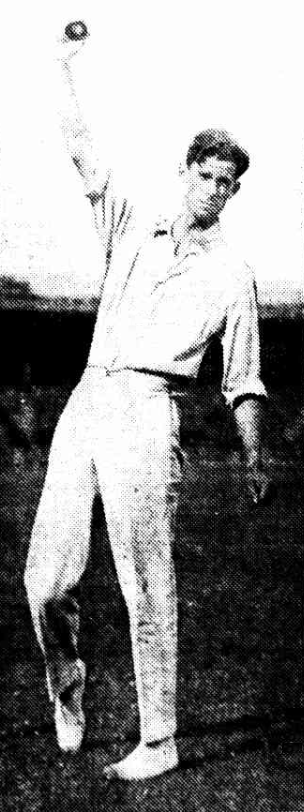

Personal information
- Born: 11 May 1898; Canterbury, Victoria, Australia
- Died: 6 June 1963 (aged 65); Melbourne, Australia
- Batting: Right-handed
- Bowling: Legbreak

Domestic team information
- Years: Team
- 1920-1924: Victoria
- Source: Cricinfo, 19 November 2015

Leslie Freemantle (11 May 1898 – 6 June 1963) was an Australian cricketer. He played five first-class cricket matches for Victoria between 1920 and 1924.

== See also ==
- List of Victoria first-class cricketers
- List of Western Australia first-class cricketers
