= Clarrie Fleay =

Australian cricketer

Personal information
- Full name: Clarence William Edward James Fleay
- Born: 27 December 1886; Gilgering, Western Australia
- Died: 6 August 1955 (aged 68); Katanning, Western Australia
- Batting: Right-handed
- Bowling: Right-arm medium
- Role: Batsman

Domestic team information
- Years: Team
- 1922/23: Western Australia

Career statistics
Competition	First-class
Matches	1
Runs scored	4
Batting average	4.00
100s/50s	0/0
Top score	4
Balls bowled	72
Wickets	2
Bowling average	18.00
5 wickets in innings	0
10 wickets in match	0
Best bowling	2/10
Catches/stumpings	2/–
- Source: CricketArchive, 30 December 2012

Clarence William Edward James Fleay (27 December 1886 – 6 August 1955) was an Australian cricketer who only played a single only first-class match, for Western Australia during the 1922–23 season.

Born on his parents' property at Gilgering, a locality between York and Beverley in the Wheatbelt region of Western Australia, Fleay boarded at The High School (now Hale School) in Perth, and played Darlot Cup cricket for the school in his final two years. He was one of his school's most successful batsmen, with his highest score an innings of 137 not out during the 1905–06 season. After the conclusion of his schooling, Fleay returned to the country, where he regularly played in district teams. At the annual Country Week tournament held in Perth, he usually represented Katanning, and sometimes captained the side.

Fleay's single match at first-class level came in November 1922, against a touring Marylebone Cricket Club side led by Archie MacLaren (although John Hartley substituted as captain in the match against Western Australia). His selection for the team was based mainly on his form in the preceding year's Country Week matches, with Joe Lanigan the only other player selected from country sides. In the match, held at the WACA Ground, Fleay, an occasional right-arm medium pace bowler, took two wickets in the MCC's first innings to finish with figures of 2/10. He scored only four runs whilst batting, and was not selected at first-class level again. Fleay spent the remainder of his life in the country, and died in Katanning in August 1955, aged 68.
