= Leonard Packham =

Australian cricketer

Personal information
- Born: 15 September 1891; Adelaide, Australia
- Died: 4 October 1958 (aged 67); Swanbourne, Australia
- Source: Cricinfo, 17 July 2017

Leonard Packham (15 September 1891 – 4 October 1958) was an Australian cricketer. He played his only first-class match for Western Australia in 1921/22.

== See also ==
- List of Western Australia first-class cricketers
