= Roderick Ryan =

Australian cricketer (1909–1979)

Personal information
- Born: 15 November 1909; Cannington, Western Australia
- Died: 23 October 1979 (aged 69); Toronto, Ontario, Canada
- Batting: Left-handed
- Role: Batsman
- Source: Cricinfo, 27 September 2017

Roderick Ryan (15 November 1909 – 23 October 1979) was an Australian cricketer. He played four first-class matches for Western Australia in 1933/34.

== See also ==
- List of Western Australia first-class cricketers
