= Alexander Barras =

Australian cricketer

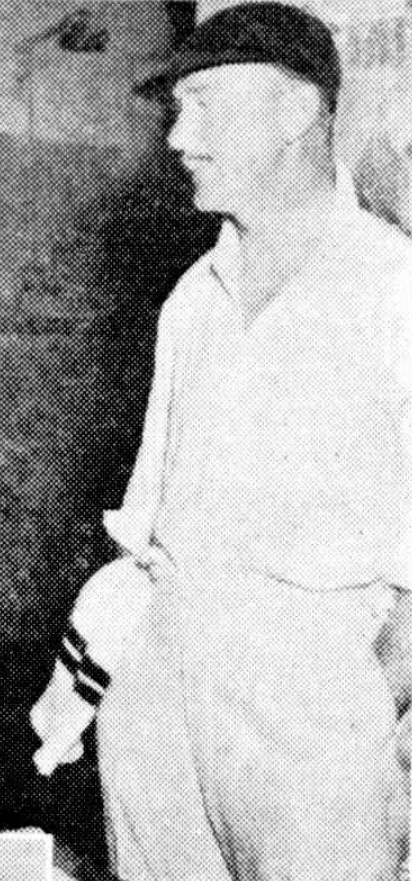

Personal information
- Born: 26 January 1914; Auburn, Victoria
- Died: 15 August 1986 (aged 72); Mount Lawley, Western Australia
- Batting: Left-handed
- Bowling: Legbreak
- Source: Cricinfo, 19 October 2017

Alexander Barras (26 January 1914 – 15 August 1986) was an Australian cricketer. He played six first-class matches for Western Australia between 1938/39 and 1947/48. He also played for Fitzroy Cricket Club.

== See also ==
- List of Western Australia first-class cricketers
