= Vernon Loton =

Australian cricketer

Personal information
- Born: 5 January 1906; Upper Swan, Western Australia
- Died: 8 June 1986 (aged 80); Pinjarra, Western Australia
- Source: Cricinfo, 26 September 2017

Vernon Loton (5 January 1906 – 8 June 1986) was an Australian cricketer. He played both his first-class matches in 1925/26, for Western Australia.

== See also ==
- List of Western Australia first-class cricketers
