= Alan Cripps =

Australian cricketer

Personal information
- Born: 11 August 1930 (age 96); Lakemba, New South Wales
- Source: Cricinfo, 3 November 2017

Alan Cripps (born 11 August 1930) is an Australian cricketer who played two first-class matches for Western Australia in 1952/53. He also played for Randwick Cricket Club.

== See also ==
- List of Western Australia first-class cricketers
