= Gordon Eyres =

Australian cricketer

Personal information
- Born: 20 December 1912; Kalgoorlie, Western Australia
- Died: 21 August 2004 (aged 91); Perth, Western Australia
- Source: Cricinfo, 19 October 2017

Gordon Eyres (20 December 1912 – 21 August 2004) was an Australian cricketer. He played eight first-class matches for Western Australia in the 1937/38 and 1939/40 seasons.

== See also ==
- List of Western Australia first-class cricketers
