= Brad Oldroyd =

Australian cricketer (born 1973)

Personal information
- Born: 5 November 1973 (age 53); Bentley, Western Australia
- Source: Cricinfo, 10 November 2017

Brad Oldroyd (born 5 November 1973) is an Australian former cricketer. He played thirty first-class matches for Western Australia between 1995/96 and 2001/02.

== See also ==
- List of Western Australia first-class cricketers
