= Reginald Carter (Australian cricketer) =

Australian cricketer

Personal information
- Born: 1 March 1888; East Brunswick, Victoria, Australia
- Died: 16 July 1970 (aged 82); Subiaco, Western Australia, Australia
- Source: Cricinfo, 14 July 2017

Reginald Carter (1 March 1888 – 16 July 1970) was an Australian cricketer. A right-handed batsman, he played three first-class matches for Western Australia in 1909/10.

== See also ==
- List of Western Australia first-class cricketers
