= Mark Lavender =

Australian cricketer

Personal information
- Full name: Mark Philip Lavender
- Born: 28 August 1967 (age 59); Madras, India
- Batting: Right-handed
- Bowling: Right-arm medium
- Role: Batsman

Domestic team information
- Years: Team
- 1990–98: Western Australia
- 1997: MCC

Career statistics
Competition	First-class	List A
Matches	53	30
Runs scored	3102	931
Batting average	34.08	35.80
100s/50s	6/14	1/8
Top score	173*	100
Balls bowled	42	n/a
Wickets	0	n/a
Bowling average	n/a	n/a
5 wickets in innings	0	n/a
10 wickets in match	0	n/a
Best bowling	0/2	n/a
Catches/stumpings	48/–	8/–

Mark Philip Lavender (born 28 August 1967) is an Australian cricketer, who played for Western Australia between 1990 and 1998.

== Early career ==
Lavender was born to Anglo-Indian parents in Madras, India, and moved to Australia at an early age. He attended the Western Australian Institute of Sport (WAIS) and represented the Western Australia Under-19s, Western Australia Colts and Western Australia Second XI teams. He also played grade cricket for Mount Lawley.

== Western Australia career ==
He made his first-class debut for Western Australia against Victoria on 15 February 1991, at the St. Kilda Cricket Ground, scoring 118 runs on debut before being dismissed by Paul Reiffel. He made his List A debut for Western Australia against Tasmania on 11 October 1991, at the WACA Ground.

In total, Lavender played 53 first-class matches, scoring 3102 runs at an average of 34.08 with a highest score of 173* achieved against New South Wales . He also played 30 List A matches, all for Western Australia, making 931 runs at an average of 35.80, with a highest score of 100.

Lavender also played one match for the MCC against Pakistan A at Denis Compton Oval during the 1997 season. He made 0 and 6* and took three catches.

== See also ==
- List of Western Australia first-class cricketers
