= Matt Garnaut =

Australian sportsman

Personal information
- Full name: Matthew Stuart Garnaut
- Born: 7 November 1973 (age 53); Subiaco, Western Australia
- Batting: Right-handed
- Bowling: Right-arm fast-medium
- Role: Bowler

Domestic team information
- Years: Team
- 1996/97–1997/98: Western Australia

Career statistics
Competition	First-class
Matches	16
Runs scored	57
Batting average	4.75
100s/50s	0/0
Top score	10*
Balls bowled	2,992
Wickets	37
Bowling average	42.00
5 wickets in innings	0
10 wickets in match	0
Best bowling	4/51
Catches/stumpings	6/–
- Source: CricketArchive, 15 November 2011

Matthew Stuart Garnaut (born 7 November 1973) is a former Australian sportsman who played Australian rules football for the East Perth Football Club in the West Australian Football League (WAFL) and cricket for Western Australia.

From Perth, a number of Garnaut's family had previously played top-level sports: his grandfather, Laurie (East Perth), father, John (East Perth), and brother, Graeme (East Perth, Peel Thunder and Subiaco) all played WAFL senior football, and his sister, Kristin, played netball for the Perth Orioles. Garnaut played Teal Cup football for Western Australia, and later played one senior match for East Perth in the WAFL in 1994. He later concentrated on cricket, making his first-class debut against South Australia in November 1996. Overall, he played 16 matches for Western Australia in the 1996–97 and 1997–98 Sheffield Shield competitions, taking 37 wickets at an average of 42.00, with a best of 4/51. Garnaut also played grade cricket for the Bayswater-Morley District Cricket Club. He was involved in a notable incident during the 1998–99 WACA First Grade final against Midland-Guildford, when he and Bret Mulder, batting tenth and eleventh respectively, put on 177 for the tenth wicket to win the tournament for Bayswater-Morley, with Garnaut finishing on 127 not out.

== See also ==
- List of Australian rules footballers and cricketers
