= Steve Russell (cricketer) =

Australian cricketer (born 1968)

Personal information
- Full name: Richard Steven Russell
- Born: 22 January 1968 (age 58); Helensville, New Zealand
- Source: Cricinfo, 6 November 2017

Richard Steven Russell (born 22 January 1968) is an Australian cricketer. He played four first-class matches for Western Australia between 1989/90 and 1993/94.

== See also ==
- List of Western Australia first-class cricketers
