= Lester Charlesworth =

Australian cricketer

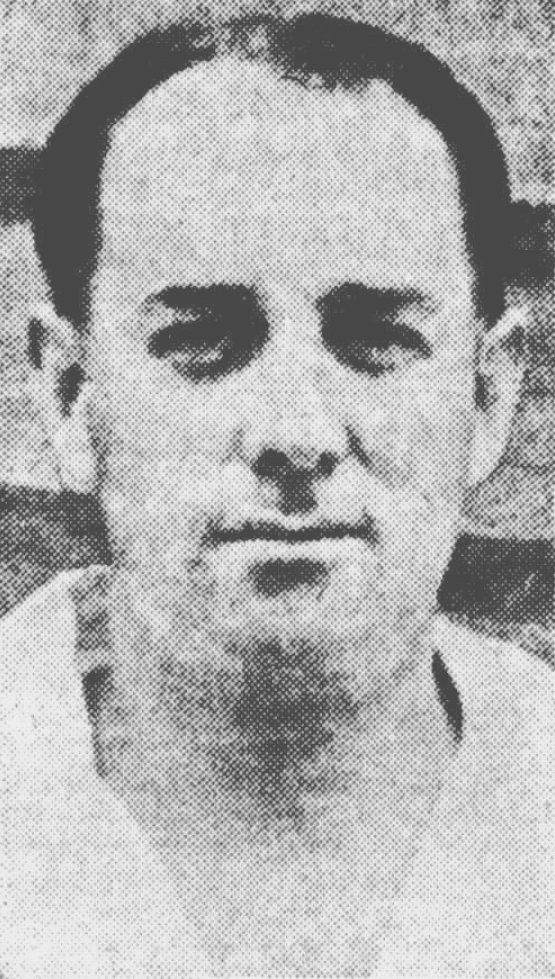

Personal information
- Born: 11 October 1916; Kanowna, Western Australia
- Died: 15 January 1980 (aged 63); Perth, Western Australia
- Source: Cricinfo, 19 October 2017

Lester Charlesworth (11 October 1916 – 15 January 1980) was an Australian cricketer. He played eight first-class matches for Western Australia from 1949/50 to 1950/51.

His son, Ric Charlesworth, was also a cricketer, hockey player, coach and politician.

== See also ==
- List of Western Australia first-class cricketers
