= William Dunstan (cricketer) =

Australian cricketer (1878–1955)

Personal information
- Born: 4 December 1878; Adelaide, Australia
- Died: 11 April 1955 (aged 76); Perth, Australia
- Batting: Right-handed
- Role: Wicketkeeper
- Source: Cricinfo, 13 July 2017

William Dunstan (4 December 1878 – 11 April 1955) was an Australian cricketer. He played one first-class match for Western Australia in 1905/06.

== See also ==
- List of Western Australia first-class cricketers
