= Arthur Christian (cricketer) =

Australian cricketer

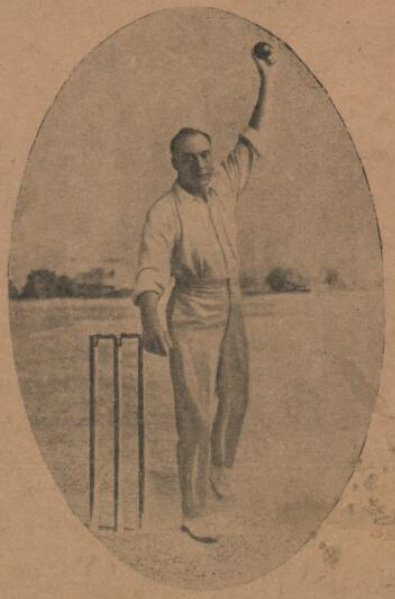

Personal information
- Born: 22 January 1877; Melbourne, Australia
- Died: 8 September 1950 (aged 73); Claremont, Australia

Domestic team information
- Years: Team
- 1904-1906: Victoria
- 1907-1922: Western Australia

Career statistics
| Competition | FC |
|---|---|
| Matches | 24 |
| Runs scored | 960 |
| Batting average | 22.85 |
| 100s/50s | -/6 |
| Top score | 98 |
| Balls bowled | ? |
| Wickets | 102 |
| Bowling average | 24.43 |
| 5 wickets in innings | 6 |
| 10 wickets in match | 2 |
| Best bowling | 7/144 |
| Catches/stumpings | 15/– |
- Source: Cricinfo, 15 November 2015

Arthur Christian (22 January 1877 – 8 September 1950) was an Australian cricketer. He was an allrounder who batted left-handed and bowled left armed slow-medium, able to have the ball break both ways. He was a prominent club cricketer in Victoria, also representing the state in first-class cricket, and later moved to Western Australia where he also played both club and state cricket and became the leading all-rounder in the state. After retiring he coached at public schools, served on the WACA executive and as a Western Australia selector, and wrote for a newspaper.

== Cricket career ==
He began his cricket career in 1896 playing for East Melbourne Cricket Club, initially playing for their Second XI side but making the First XI by 1897. He played seven first-class cricket matches for Victoria between 1904 and 1906, with a highlight of his career for the state being a score of 98 made in 80 minutes against New South Wales. He left Victoria to move to Western Australia in May 1906 as he had secured a position on the goldfields in his career as an assayist and metallurgist.

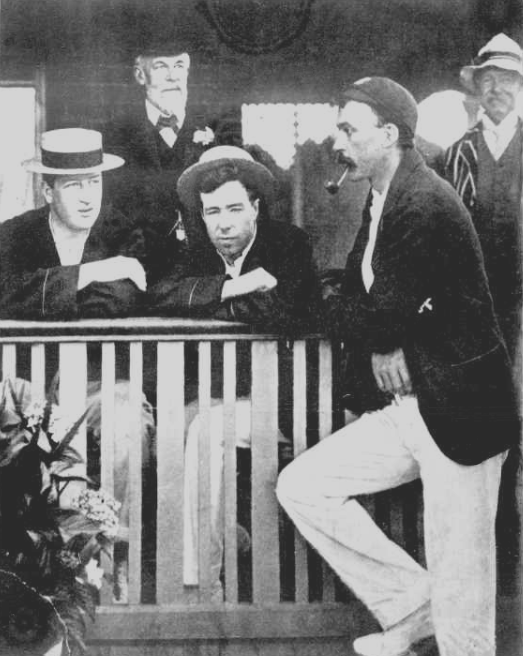
Arthur Christian (front right) with fellow Vic cricketers, 1906.

As of September 1906 Christian was training for cricket in Western Australia for the Kamballie Club, and he represented them in the Potts Shield in October. By December he was playing for Burbanks. In 1907 he represented Western Australia against New South Wales, and the opposition captain described him as the best of the West Australian bowlers praising his length and variation of pace. In October Christian played in a three-day cricket match between a team representing the goldfields and one representing the coastal districts.

Later in October 1907, Arthur was the only goldfields cricketer selected to represent West Australia in a tour game against the Marylebone Cricket Club which was part of the 1907-08 Ashes tour. He took five wickets and batted at five in the first innings scoring 3 and opened in the second innings scoring 15. West Australia losing by an innings. English captain Arthur Jones praised his bowling, expressing that he was likely to improve, and also noted he thought him a capable batsman. In November 1907 Christian moved from the rural goldfields to Perth as he had secured a job with a leading sporting firm, Alcock & Co., and he also joined the Corinthian cricket club, and played his first match for them against Subiaco on 16 November in which he took 5 for 73.

In March 1908 Christian was selected to represent Western Australia against the M.C.C. again in the last match of the 1907-08 Ashes tour, and one report called for him to be made captain. He did not captain but did take 3 wickets for 130 runs which included bowling Jack Hobbs, who dragged the ball onto his stumps, in the M.C.C.s only innings with the match ending in a draw. By the end of his first club season for Corinthians in 1908 Arthur had topped both the batting and bowling averages, averaging 36.77 with the bat and 11.46 with the ball. He was also named honorary coach of junior players for the club at the Corinthians annual meeting in August 1908. In September 1908 Christian left Alcock & Co. and opened his own sports store called the Perth Sports Depot, with advertising for the new store emphasizing his role in selecting the stock and his reputation as a cricketer. Early advertising targeted cricket clubs as potential clients, and he offered one of the stores bats as a trophy for a local cricket competition. As of October 1908 Arthur had been appointed as Captain of Corinthians for the upcoming club season.

Christian had a strong season in club cricket in 1908–09. In the second match of the season, played against Subiaco, he took 3 for 21, 4 for 33, and scored 143 in Corinthians only innings batting. In the third match against West Perth he took 8 for 20 and 4 for 31, also taking a hattrick, and scored 61. In a match against Fremantle Christian criticized the opposition for unsportsmanlike behavior due to an incident where the North Fremantle wicket keeper was hit in the body by the ball and hurt, and Christian's batting partner was run out after leaving his crease to check the keepers well-being. By February 1909 Corinthians was leading the competition and a report credited their success to Christian's allround abilities. By March he had taken 100 wickets at an average of 7.1 in the club season. Corinthians were ultimately premiers of the 1908-09 club cricket season.

In April 1909 Christian was selected to captain West Australia against South Australia. In the first interstate game he won the toss and took 5 for 67 in one innings, but the match was drawn. In total South Australia played three games against the West and Christian took 25 out of WA's 46 wickets at an average of 17 in the series. All three games in the series were drawn. One series report noted Christian's performances as an all-rounder were the most notable events in each game. Some of the South Australian players said they thought Christian would have been selected for the 1909 Ashes had he still been playing in Victoria.

In 1909 some comments from Christian were published in a Victorian newspaper in which he expressed the opinion that Western Australian wickets were not as good as those in the eastern states and that there were too many clubs competing in WA club cricket, although he positively noted that there were plans to divide the club competition into two grades for the 1909–10 season. The interview was reprinted in a Western Australian newspaper with the headline "Western Australian cricket criticised by Arthur Christian". By November 1909 he was being referred to as about the best all-round cricketer in West Australia.

Christian was re-elected as captain of Corinthians for the 1909-10 club cricket season. In the fourth round he scored 135 not out against South Fremantle, although he was dropped three times. In the same match he also took 8 for 26. In the first match after the Christmas break in the season he took 7 for 26 against Henley Park. By February 1910 he had taken over 60 wickets at an average close to 8 in the season, but after his century his batting had been poor. By the end of the season he had taken 68 wickets at an average of 8.89 and also topped the batting averages for Corinthians, making it the third straight season he had topped both batting and bowling averages for the club. Corinthians merged with the East Perth football club at the end of the 1910 season and played under the name East Perth from the next season.

In March 1910 Christian was selected as captain of West Australia for a series of games against Victoria. In November 1910 Christian provided a plan for improving the standard of Western Australian cricket to a local paper. Due to the remoteness of the state he argued that interstate matches could not be frequent, and that instead intrastate matches between sides representing the metropolitan, goldfield, and south-west regions of the state should be regularly played. He also again expressed that there were too many clubs competing in club cricket and stated that they should be separated into different grades. Also in November it was rumored that Christian may be selected to represent Australia against South Africa in the home series, and a newspaper report ranked him as among the top six all-rounders in the country. In December he was serving on the selection committee for a coastal team which was to play a goldfields team but he had to resign due to business commitments before the game.

In January 1911 Christian captained East Perth in a novelty match against the Eumarella women's cricket team, where the men had to bat, bowl, and field with their wrong hand and every misfield resulted in two runs being awarded to Eumarella. In the early 1911 grade season the competition was split into two grades, and Christian had the best bowling average in the A grade competition season at 8.16, the most wickets with 92, and also scored 600 runs at an average of 33.05 in addition to captaining East Perth A team to the premiership. In October 1911 he changed teams, moving to North Perth, due to a new district system being introduced to revitalize grade cricket with him falling in the North Perth division. He scored a 122 in 35 minutes and took 6 for 11 in a match for North Perth in the opening game of the season in October 1911.

== Statistics ==
In his state career Christian played 24 first-class matches. He scored 960 runs at an average of 22.85 with 6 fifties and took 15 catches, and took 102 wickets at an average of 24.43 with 6 five wicket hauls and 2 ten wicket hauls. Of these 793 runs and 82 wickets were scored/taken for Western Australia.

In his Victorian club career he scored 2509 runs at an average of 30 with a high score of 145 not out, and took 255 wickets at an average of 13.8. In his Western Australian club career he scored 6655 runs at an average of 38.3 and took 995 wickets at an average of 8.6, taking over 100 wickets in a season twice.

== See also ==
- List of Victoria first-class cricketers
- List of Western Australia first-class cricketers
