= John Taylor (cricketer, born 1979) =

Australian cricketer

Personal information
- Full name: John James Taylor
- Born: 3 April 1979 (age 47); Essendon, Victoria, Australia
- Batting: Right-handed
- Bowling: Right-arm fast-medium
- Role: All-rounder

Domestic team information
- Years: Team
- 2003–2004: Western Australia

Career statistics
Competition	FC	LA
Matches	6	8
Runs scored	132	47
Batting average	18.85	11.75
100s/50s	0/1	0/0
Top score	50	34
Balls bowled	816	372
Wickets	12	11
Bowling average	51.25	26.36
5 wickets in innings	0	0
10 wickets in match	0	n/a
Best bowling	4/70	3/27
Catches/stumpings	3/-	0/-
- Source: CricketArchive, 1 February 2013

John James Taylor (born 3 April 1979) is a former Australian cricketer.

== Career ==
Taylor played several matches for Western Australia during the 2003–04 season. From Melbourne, Taylor played his early cricket in Victoria, representing the state's under-19s and second XI teams. Prior to the 2002–03 season, he moved to Western Australia, hoping to gain selection at senior level. Taylor made his limited-overs debut for Western Australia in the ING Cup in early November 2003, and his Pura Cup debut shortly after. A right-handed all-rounder, he was regularly selected in both formats of the game during the 2003–04 season, playing first-class matches and eight limited-overs matches. Taylor's best bowling figures, 4/70, came against Victoria in late November 2003, while his highest first-class score (and only half-century) was an innings of 50 runs against New South Wales in late January 2004. However, at the end of the season he returned to Victoria for family reasons, despite having been offered a full contract from the Western Australian Cricket Association (WACA) for the following season. Taylor did not play at state level again, but did play one match for a Victorian Invitation XI against the touring New Zealanders in December 2004.

== See also ==
- List of Western Australia first-class cricketers
