= Barney O'Shaughnessy =

Australian cricketer

Personal information
- Born: 28 February 1912; Wiluna, Western Australia
- Died: 27 May 2007 (aged 95); Nedlands, Western Australia
- Batting: Right-handed
- Bowling: Right-arm fast

Domestic team information
- Years: Team
- 1932/33: Western Australia

Career statistics
Competition	First-class
Matches	1
Runs scored	0
Batting average	0.00
100s/50s	0/0
Top score	0
Balls bowled	144
Wickets	1
Bowling average	81.00
5 wickets in innings	0
10 wickets in match	0
Best bowling	1/31
Catches/stumpings	0/–
- Source: CricketArchive, 2 December 2012

Barney O'Shaughnessy (28 February 1912 – 27 May 2007) was an Australian cricketer who played a single first-class match for Western Australia. Born in the isolated Mid-West town of Wiluna, Western Australia, where his family managed a hotel, O'Shaughnessy was sent to Perth for schooling, attending Christian Brothers' College as a boarder. Playing as a fast bowler and attacking batsman, he played cricket for the school in the Darlot Cup, and also captained the school's football team in 1931, his final year at the school. In one match, against Scotch College in November 1931, O'Shaughnessy scored exactly 100 runs, from 65 minutes of batting, including seven sixes and nine fours.

O'Shaughnessy's only first-class match, for Western Australia, was against the Marylebone Cricket Club on their 1932–33 tour of Australia. In the match, held at the WACA Ground in late October 1932, he opened Western Australia's bowling alongside Ron Halcombe in both innings, taking 0/50 in the first and 1/31 in the second innings. His only wicket was that of Leslie Ames, who he bowled for 19 runs. He batted at number ten in Western Australia's only innings, and scored a duck. O'Shaughnessy returned to Wiluna in 1933 to take over the Club Hotel, which his family had previously run. During the Second World War, O'Shaughnessy enlisted in the Australian Army, along with several other sportsmen from Western Australia. He served as a private in the 2/1 Guard Regiment, and was discharged in November 1944. O'Shaughnessy eventually retired to Perth, dying in Nedlands in May 2007, at the age of 95.

== See also ==
- List of Western Australia first-class cricketers
