= Harry Clark (cricketer) =

Australian cricketer

Personal information
- Born: 23 April 1892; Sydney, Australia
- Died: 8 February 1973 (aged 80); Perth, Australia
- Source: Cricinfo, 18 July 2017

Harry Clark (23 April 1892 – 8 February 1973) was an Australian cricketer. He played his only first-class match in 1922/23, for Western Australia.

== See also ==
- List of Western Australia first-class cricketers
