= Leslie Varis =

Australian cricketer (born 1947)

Personal information
- Born: 13 May 1947 (age 79); Kalgoorlie, Western Australia
- Batting: Right-handed
- Bowling: Right arm Medium
- Source: Cricinfo, 6 November 2017

Leslie Varis (born 13 May 1947) is an Australian cricketer. He played nineteen first-class matches for Western Australia between 1966/67 and 1972/73.

== See also ==
- List of Western Australia first-class cricketers
