= Walter Hughes (cricketer) =

Australian cricketer

Personal information
- Full name: Walter Cecil Hughes
- Born: 13 August 1882; Adelaide, Australia
- Died: 16 August 1917 (aged 35); Perth, Australia
- Batting: Left-handed
- Bowling: Left arm fast
- Source: Cricinfo, 14 July 2017

Walter Cecil Hughes (13 August 1882 – 16 August 1917) was an Australian cricketer. He played five first-class matches for Western Australia in 1912/13. He shot himself at a factory in 1917 and died at hospital.

== See also ==
- List of Western Australia first-class cricketers
