= Lewis Germaine =

Australian cricketer

Personal information
- Born: 1 March 1935; Melbourne, Australia
- Died: 8 April 1992 (aged 57); Melbourne, Australia
- Batting: Right-handed
- Bowling: Legbreak googly

Domestic team information
- Years: Team
- 1956/57 - 1957/58: Victoria
- 1957/58 - 1959/60: Western Australia
- Source: Cricinfo, 3 December 2015

Lewis Germaine (1 March 1935 – 8 April 1992) was an Australian cricketer. He played 16 first-class cricket matches for Victoria and Western Australia from 1956/57 to 1959/60.

== See also ==
- List of Victoria first-class cricketers
- List of Western Australia first-class cricketers
