= Peter Dunn (cricketer) =

Australian cricketer

Personal information
- Born: 6 August 1921; Westonia, Western Australia
- Died: 1 February 2004 (aged 82); Perth, Western Australia
- Batting: Left-handed
- Bowling: Left arm fast medium
- Source: Cricinfo, 19 October 2017

Peter Dunn (8 August 1921 – 1 February 2004) was an Australian cricketer. He played eighteen first-class matches for Western Australia between 1948/49 and 1952/53.

== See also ==
- List of Western Australia first-class cricketers
