= Alfred Smith (Australian cricketer) =

Australian cricketer

Personal information
- Born: 4 October 1908; Melbourne, Australia
- Died: 17 January 1989 (aged 80); Fremantle, Western Australia
- Source: Cricinfo, 26 September 2017

Alfred Smith (4 October 1908 – 17 January 1989) was an Australian cricketer. He played two first-class matches for Western Australia in 1925/26 and 1926/27.

== See also ==
- List of Western Australia first-class cricketers
