= Brian Muggleton =

Australian cricketer and baseball player

Personal information
- Full name: Mervyn Brian Muggleton
- Born: 4 September 1941; Unley, South Australia, Australia
- Died: 12 May 2022 (aged 80); Fremantle, Western Australia
- Batting: Right-handed
- Role: Batsman

Domestic team information
- Years: Team
- 1965–1969: Western Australia

Career statistics
Competition	FC
Matches	3
Runs scored	50
Batting average	8.33
100s/50s	0/0
Top score	21
Balls bowled	8
Wickets	1
Bowling average	2.00
5 wickets in innings	0
10 wickets in match	0
Best bowling	1/2
Catches/stumpings	0/–
- Source: CricketArchive, 29 December 2012

Mervyn Brian Muggleton (4 September 1941 – 12 May 2022) was an Australian cricketer and baseball player.

The son of Merv Muggleton, who had played baseball for Sturt and South Australia, Muggleton was born in Adelaide, South Australia, but moved with his family to Perth, Western Australia, in 1949, after his father was transferred. He made his state cricket debut for Western Australia during the 1964–65 season, scoring 21 and 12 runs in a Sheffield Shield match against New South Wales as a middle-order batsman. Muggleton's next matches at first-class level did not come until the 1969–70 season. He scored only 17 runs from four innings, and was not selected for Western Australia again.

Muggleton was also a keen baseballer, playing for Western Australia in Claxton Shield matches and for the Melville Braves at club level, where his father had coached for 16 seasons. After his retirement from playing, Muggleton remained involved with Melville in several different roles, serving as coach during the 1977–78, 1978–79, 1979–80, and 1990–91 seasons, and as president during the 1978–79 and 1981–82 seasons. He was a life member of the club.

== See also ==
- List of Western Australia first-class cricketers
