= Ronald Sarre =

Australian cricketer

Personal information
- Born: 20 January 1932; Midland, Western Australia
- Died: 3 September 2009 (aged 77); Perth, Western Australia
- Batting: Right-handed
- Bowling: Right arm offbreak
- Role: Top-order batsman
- Source: Cricinfo, 19 October 2017

Ronald Sarre (20 January 1932 – 3 September 2009) was an Australian cricketer. He played fifteen first-class matches for Western Australia between 1951/52 and 1954/55.

1952-53 was his most productive season, by far, when he scored 305 runs (out of his total 523 first-class runs) including two half centuries. Sarre's only century (103) came in March 1953 against a "reasonably strong Australia XI" on their way to the Ashes in England.

== See also ==
- List of Western Australia first-class cricketers
