= Ivan Campbell =

Australian cricketer

Personal information
- Born: 29 October 1908; Perth, Western Australia
- Died: 22 January 1962 (aged 53); Nedlands, Western Australia
- Batting: Right-handed
- Role: Batsman
- Source: Cricinfo, 27 September 2017

Ivan Campbell (29 October 1908 – 22 January 1962) was an Australian cricketer. He played two first-class matches for Western Australia in 1933/34.
