= Len Pavy =

Australian cricketer (1936–2026)

Personal information
- Full name: Leonard Pavy
- Born: 21 August 1936; Boulder, Western Australia
- Died: 31 January 2026 (aged 89)
- Height: 5 ft 10 in (1.78 m)
- Batting: Left-handed
- Role: Middle-order batsman

Domestic team information
- Years: Team
- 1953–54 to 1955–56: Western Australia

Career statistics
| Competition | First-class |
|---|---|
| Matches | 7 |
| Runs scored | 169 |
| Batting average | 15.36 |
| 100s/50s | 0/0 |
| Top score | 36* |
| Balls bowled | 8 |
| Wickets | 0 |
| Bowling average | – |
| 5 wickets in innings | 0 |
| 10 wickets in match | 0 |
| Best bowling | – |
| Catches/stumpings | 5/– |
- Source: Cricinfo, 21 May 2020

Leonard Pavy (21 August 1936 – 31 January 2026) was an Australian cricketer. He played seven first-class matches for Western Australia in 1954 and 1955.

== Life and career ==
Len Pavy was educated at Perth Modern School and the University of Western Australia. A middle-order batsman, he played his first match for Western Australia in February 1954 when he was 17. He is one of only three West Australian players to make their first-class debuts at 17, the other two being Shaun Marsh in 2000–01 and Cameron Green in 2016–17. He made his highest first-class score against the touring MCC in 1954–55 when he batted for three hours to make 36 not out in the second innings. His first-class career ended when he was only 19, after a ball struck him on the head while he was batting against New South Wales in December 1955.

Pavy was a school Physical Education teacher, and later taught PE teachers. In 1983 he was the West Australian director of coaching. With the assistance of the Test players Bruce Laird, Dennis Lillee and Rod Marsh he made a series of instructional cricket kits in 1984, titled Howzat. He served as a state selector, and in 1994 he prepared a report for the West Australian government on the recognition of umpires and referees in all sports.

Pavy was awarded life membership of the Australian Physical Education Teachers Association in 1991. He received the Australian Sports Medal in 2000. In 2007 he was made an honorary life member of the Western Australian Cricket Association for his services as player and administrator. In recognition of his lifelong work for junior cricket in Western Australia he was awarded the first-ever life membership of the Community Junior Cricket Council in 2019. The Council presents the Len Pavy Award to the Junior Club of the Year.

Pavy died on 31 January 2026, aged 89.
