= Hugh Bevan (cricketer) =

Australian cricketer (1932–2005)

Personal information
- Born: 21 December 1932; Perth, Western Australia
- Died: 15 June 2005 (aged 72); East Fremantle, Western Australia
- Batting: Right-handed
- Bowling: Left arm Fast medium
- Source: Cricinfo, 3 November 2017

Hugh Bevan (21 December 1932 – 15 June 2005) was an Australian cricketer. He played 43 first-class matches for Western Australia between 1956/57 and 1963/64.

Bevan was a left-arm fast bowler with "sharp pace and a dangerous inswinger", who "came close to Test selection" after Alan Davidson retired, but was not fully fit and went wicketless when he played for an Australian XI against the visiting South Africans in 1963-64.
