= Thomas Coyne (cricketer) =

Australian cricketer

Personal information
- Born: 12 October 1873; Edgerton, Victoria, Australia
- Died: 8 April 1955 (aged 81); Christchurch, Canterbury, New Zealand
- Source: Cricinfo, 13 July 2017

Thomas Coyne (12 October 1873 – 8 April 1955) was an Australian cricketer. He played four first-class matches for Western Australia from 1905/06 to 1908/09.

== See also ==
- List of Western Australia first-class cricketers
