= Anthony Zimbulis =

Australian cricketer

Personal information
- Full name: Anthony George Zimbulis
- Born: 11 February 1918; Perth, Western Australia
- Died: 17 May 1963 (aged 45); Rockingham, Western Australia
- Batting: Right-handed
- Bowling: Leg break googly

Domestic team information
- Years: Team
- 1933/34–1939/40: Western Australia
- Source: ESPNcricinfo, 7 December 2015

Anthony George Zimbulis (11 February 1918 – 17 May 1963) was an Australian cricketer. He was a right-handed batsman and leg break, googly bowler. He played 15 first-class cricket matches for Western Australia between 1934 and 1940, scoring 320 runs and taking 43 wickets.
