= Colin Penter =

Australian cricketer

Personal information
- Full name: Colin Edward Penter
- Born: 20 June 1955 (age 71); Albany, Western Australia
- Batting: Left-handed
- Bowling: Right-arm leg break googly
- Role: Batsman

Domestic team information
- Years: Team
- 1979/80–1980/80: Western Australia

Career statistics
Competition	First-class
Matches	8
Runs scored	286
Batting average	26.00
100s/50s	1/1
Top score	112
Balls bowled	925
Wickets	5
Bowling average	101.40
5 wickets in innings	0
10 wickets in match	0
Best bowling	1/26
Catches/stumpings	5/–
- Source: CricketArchive, 15 August 2011

Colin Edward Penter (born 20 July 1955) is a former Australian cricketer who played for Western Australia between 1979 and 1980.

He played eight matches for Western Australia Colts against other states' colts sides before making his first-class for Western Australia against New South Wales in October 1979, scoring 112 on debut and featuring in a partnership of 132 runs with Tony Mann (52*). He made a half-century in his third match, against Tasmania, but failed to make more than 50 runs in any of his further innings, playing his final match against the touring India national cricket team in November 1980, scoring 42* in his only innings.

His brother Kevan Penter also played for Western Australia Colts between 1973 and 1975, and is the current president of the University Cricket Club in the Western Australian Grade Cricket competition.
