= Edward Bishop (cricketer) =

Australian cricketer

Personal information
- Full name: Edward George Bishop
- Born: 4 August 1872
- Died: 16 February 1943 (aged 70); Nedlands, Western Australia, Australia
- Batting: Right-handed
- Role: Bowler

Domestic team information
- Years: Team
- 1892–1899: Western Australia

Career statistics
Competition	FC
Matches	3
Runs scored	11
Batting average
100s/50s
Top score
Balls bowled
Wickets	8
Bowling average
5 wickets in innings
10 wickets in match
Best bowling
Catches/stumpings
- Source: Cricinfo, 28 July 2013

Edward Bishop (4 August 1872 – 16 February 1943) was an Australian cricketer. He played for Western Australia in 1892 and 1899.

== See also ==
- List of Western Australia first-class cricketers
