= William Miller (cricketer, born 1905) =

Australian cricketer

Personal information
- Born: 9 March 1905; Perth, Western Australia
- Died: 24 June 1974 (aged 69); Perth, Western Australia
- Source: Cricinfo, 22 August 2017

William Miller (9 March 1905 – 24 June 1974) was an Australian cricketer. He played his only first-class match in 1924/25, for Western Australia.
