= Robert McFarlane (cricketer) =

Australian cricketer (born 1955)

Personal information
- Born: 7 February 1955 (age 71); Corrigin, Western Australia
- Source: Cricinfo, 6 November 2017

Robert McFarlane (born 7 February 1955) is an Australian cricketer. He played two first-class matches for Western Australia in 1981/82.
