= Henry Grigg =

Australian cricketer

Personal information
- Born: 24 May 1906; Fremantle, Western Australia
- Died: 9 July 1991 (aged 85); Inglewood, Perth, Australia
- Batting: Right-handed
- Source: Cricinfo, 26 September 2017

Henry Grigg (24 May 1906 – 9 July 1991) was an Australian cricketer. He played three first-class matches for Western Australia in 1925/26, with 30 being his highest score across six innings.

== See also ==
- List of Western Australia first-class cricketers
