= Malcolm Wolfe =

Australian cricketer

Personal information
- Full name: Malcolm Frederick Wolfe
- Born: 28 July 1952 (age 74); Gnowangerup, Western Australia
- Batting: Left-handed
- Bowling: Right-arm off break
- Role: Batsman

Domestic team information
- Years: Team
- 1982/83: Western Australia

Career statistics
Competition	First-class
Matches	1
Runs scored	39
Batting average	39.00
100s/50s	0/0
Top score	39
Balls bowled	6
Wickets	0
Bowling average	–
5 wickets in innings	–
10 wickets in match	–
Best bowling	–
Catches/stumpings	1/–
- Source: CricketArchive, 15 December 2012

Malcolm Frederick Wolfe (born 28 July 1952) is a former Australian cricketer who played a single match for Western Australia.

Born in Gnowangerup, Western Australia, Wolfe played several matches at colts level during the early 1970s, but did not play at first-class level until the 1982–83 season. His sole match at state level came in a Sheffield Shield match against New South Wales in October 1982 at the WACA Ground. In the match, Wolfe batting fourth in Western Australia's only innings, behind Geoff Marsh, Shane Clements and Greg Shipperd. He scored 39 runs before being dismissed by John Skilbeck, having combined with Shipperd (166) for an 87-run partnership for the third wicket.
