= William Roach (cricketer) =

Australian cricketer

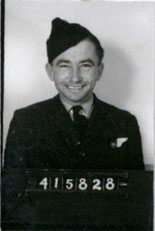

Personal information
- Born: 12 December 1914; South Fremantle, Western Australia, Australia
- Died: 8 June 1944 (aged 29); Frisian Islands
- Batting: Left-handed
- Role: Batsman
- Source: Cricinfo, 27 September 2017

William Roach (12 December 1914 – 8 June 1944) was an Australian cricketer. He played three first-class matches for Western Australia in 1933/34.
