= Warren Wishart =

Australian cricketer (born 1971)

Personal information
- Born: 17 February 1971 (age 55); Perth, Western Australia
- Source: Cricinfo, 10 November 2017

Warren Wishart (born 17 February 1971) is an Australian cricketer. He played seven first-class matches for Western Australia in 1993/94.
