= Henry Walkerden =

Australian cricketer

Personal information
- Full name: Henry Ernest Walkerden
- Born: 20 November 1885; Brunswick, Victoria, Australia
- Died: 16 May 1966 (aged 80); Coburg, Victoria, Australia
- Batting: Right-handed

Domestic team information
- Years: Team
- 1909/10: Western Australia
- Source: ESPNcricinfo, 28 December 2015

Henry Ernest Walkerden (20 November 1885 – 16 May 1966) was an Australian cricketer. A right-handed batsman, Walkerden played one first-class cricket match for Western Australia in the 1909–10 season, scoring six runs.
