= Lloyd Herring =

Australian cricketer

Personal information
- Full name: Llewellyn Lloyd Herring
- Born: 3 April 1871; Clunes, Victoria, Australia
- Died: 5 August 1922 (aged 51); Nedlands, Western Australia
- Batting: Right-handed
- Role: Batsman

Domestic team information
- Years: Team
- 1898/99: Western Australia

Career statistics
Competition	First-class
Matches	1
Runs scored	41
Batting average	20.50
100s/50s	0/0
Top score	34
Catches/stumpings	0/–
- Source: Cricinfo, 28 July 2013

Lloyd Herring (3 April 1871 – 5 August 1922) was an Australian cricketer. He played for Western Australia in 1898 and 1899.
