= Ron Sands =

Australian cricketer

Personal information
- Full name: Ronald Francis Sands
- Born: 16 September 1921; Perth, Western Australia
- Died: 5 September 1995 (aged 73); Nedlands, Western Australia
- Batting: Right-handed
- Role: Wicket-keeper

Domestic team information
- Years: Team
- 1947/48: Western Australia

Career statistics
| Competition | First-class |
|---|---|
| Matches | 1 |
| Runs scored | 15 |
| Batting average | 7.50 |
| 100s/50s | 0/0 |
| Top score | 13 |
| Catches/stumpings | 1/0 |
- Source: CricketArchive, 12 December 2012

Ronald Francis Sands (16 September 1921 – 5 September 1995) was an Australian cricketer who played a single first-class match for Western Australia. Born in Perth, Sands enlisted in the Royal Australian Navy in December 1940, and served at the rank of able seaman until October 1942, when he was discharged. He subsequently re-enlisted in the Australian Army in May 1943, and served as a driver in the Service Corps until the end of the war. After leaving the military, Sands took up playing for Subiaco in the WACA grade cricket competition, playing as a wicket-keeper. In February 1948, he was selected to play for Western Australia against India during their 1947–48 tour of Australia, having been considered a potential longterm replacement for Gwilym Kessey at state level. In the match, held at the WACA Ground, Sands was dismissed cheaply in both innings, and took two catches, one in each innings. This was to be his only first-class match. For the 1948–49 season, Sands switched to play for Midland–Guildford, having been appointed the club's captain-coach. In February 1950, he moved to New South Wales in an attempt to play Sydney grade cricket for the St George Cricket Club. Sands was unsuccessful, and returned to Western Australian and Midland–Guildford for the 1951–52 season. In later years, he gave up the position of wicket-keeper, and played solely as a batsman. Sands died in Nedlands in September 1995.
