= Ian Gallash =

Australian cricketer

Personal information
- Born: 17 June 1937 (age 89); Perth, Western Australia
- Batting: Right-handed
- Bowling: Right arm fast medium
- Source: Cricinfo, 6 November 2017

Ian Gallash (born 17 June 1937) is an Australian cricketer. He played eleven first-class matches for Western Australia during 1962/63 and 1963/64.
