= Ernest Harvey (cricketer) =

Australian cricketer

Ernest Harvey (14 December 1880 – 19 October 1923) was an Australian cricketer.

Harvey was born in Redfern, Sydney, Australia. He died in Perth, Australia, aged 43. He played one first-class match, for the Western Australia cricket team.

== See also ==
- List of Western Australia first-class cricketers
