= Alfred Randell =

Australian cricketer

Personal information
- Full name: Alfred Charles Randell
- Born: 10 May 1884; Perth, Western Australia
- Died: 13 September 1958 (aged 74); Sydney, New South Wales
- Batting: Right-handed

Domestic team information
- Years: Team
- 1912/13–1921/22: Western Australia
- Source: Cricinfo, 14 July 2017

Alfred Charles Randell (10 May 1884 – 13 September 1958) was an Australian cricketer. He played five first-class matches for Western Australia between the 1912–13 season and 1921–22.

Born at Perth in 1884, Randell played club cricket for the North Perth and Maylands-Mount Lawley clubs in the city. He played in four of his five first-class matches during the 1912–13 season. He scored a total of 139 runs during the season, and played in four of Western Australia's five matches. He made his final first-class appearance in 1921–22, as well as playing for the side against an Australian XI in 1911–12 and the touring England Test side in 1920–21, both matches not being awarded first-class status.

From 1946 until his death in 1958, Randell was Western Australia's representative on the Australian Board of Control for International Cricket. He died at Sydney in September 1958, following a board meeting. He was aged 74.
