= Joseph Lanigan =

Australian cricketer

Personal information
- Born: 8 July 1891; Mogumber, Australia
- Died: 30 September 1972 (aged 81); Glendalough, Australia
- Source: Cricinfo, 17 July 2017

Joseph Lanigan (8 July 1891 – 30 September 1972) was an Australian cricketer. He played two first-class matches for Western Australia in 1921/22 and 1922/23.

== See also ==
- List of Western Australia first-class cricketers
