= Trevor Bidstrup =

Australian cricketer

Personal information
- Full name: Trevor Allan Bidstrup
- Born: 29 December 1937; Midland, Western Australia
- Died: 25 December 2022 (aged 84); Bolwarra, New South Wales, Australia
- Batting: Right-handed
- Bowling: Right arm fast medium
- Role: Bowler

Domestic team information
- Years: Team
- 1957/58–1960/61: Western Australia
- Source: Cricinfo, 3 November 2017

Trevor Allan Bidstrup (29 December 1937 – 25 December 2022) was an Australian cricketer. He played two first-class matches for Western Australia, one each in the 1957/58 and 1960/61 seasons.

Bidstrup died in December 2022, at the age of 84.

== See also ==
- List of Western Australia first-class cricketers
