= Geoffrey Forsaith =

Australian cricketer (1931–2020)

Personal information
- Born: 5 January 1931; Perth, Western Australia
- Died: 1 October 2020 (aged 89); Sydney, New South Wales
- Batting: Left-handed
- Bowling: Right arm fast medium
- Source: Cricinfo, 6 November 2017

Geoffrey Milner Forsaith (5 January 1931 – 1 October 2020) was an Australian cricketer. He played one first-class match for Western Australia in 1961/62. Forsaith died in Sydney on 1 October 2020, at the age of 89.
