= Thomas Cullinan (Australian cricketer) =

Australian cricketer (??–1907)

Personal information
- Full name: Thomas Henry Cullinan
- Born: South Australia
- Died: 31 July 1907; Fremantle, Western Australia

Domestic team information
- Years: Team
- 1892/93: Western Australia

Career statistics
Competition	First-class
Matches	1
Runs scored	9
Batting average	4.50
100s/50s	0/0
Top score	8
Balls bowled	12
Wickets	0
Bowling average	–
5 wickets in innings	–
10 wickets in match	–
Best bowling	–
Catches/stumpings	0/–
- Source: CricketArchive, 2 December 2012

Thomas Henry Cullinan (died 31 July 1907) was an Australian cricketer. Little is known of his early life, other than that he was a native of South Australia, and had been resident in Unley before emigrating to Fremantle, Western Australia. Playing at grade cricket level for the Fremantle District Cricket Club, Cullinan was selected in the state team's squad for their inaugural tour of the eastern colonies, in the 1892–93 season, with William Back and Bill Bateman the other Fremantle players selected in the squad. He had originally been an emergency reserve for the tour, but made the team after other players were unable to gain time off work. Cullinan's one first-class match on the tour was played against South Australia at the Adelaide Oval in late March 1893, and he recorded scores of eight runs in the first innings and one run in the second innings. Cullinan also participated in several minor matches on tour, including against the Melbourne Cricket Club and a Victorian "juniors" team. He died in Fremantle in July 1907.
