= Harold Lang (cricketer) =

Australian cricketer (1905–1991)

Personal information
- Born: 23 August 1905; Stawell, Victoria
- Died: 23 April 1991 (aged 85); Nedlands, Western Australia
- Source: Cricinfo, 27 September 2017

Harold Lang (23 August 1905 – 23 April 1991) was an Australian cricketer. He played two first-class matches for Western Australia from 1929/30 to 1931/32.

== See also ==
- List of Western Australia first-class cricketers
