= Bret Mulder =

Australian cricketer (born 1964)

Personal information
- Born: 6 February 1964 (age 62); Perth, Western Australia
- Batting: Right-handed
- Bowling: Right arm offbreak
- Role: Bowler

Domestic team information
- Years: Team
- 1983/84–1998/99: Western Australia
- FC debut: 18 November 1983 Western Australia v Victoria
- Last FC: 26 November 1998 Western Australia v New South Wales

Career statistics
Competition	First-class
Matches	25
Runs scored	101
Batting average	8.41
100s/50s	0/0
Top score	25*
Balls bowled	4,850
Wickets	59
Bowling average	35.79
5 wickets in innings	3
10 wickets in match	1
Best bowling	6/65
Catches/stumpings	14/–
- Source: cricketarchive, 6 October 2011

Bret Mulder (born 6 February 1964) is an Australian former cricketer.

Mulder made his debut for Western Australia in 1983. He played 14 times for WA until 1987. He returned to the state team in 1997, playing another 11 matches until 1998.

Mulder is assistant coach of the Denmark national cricket team.
