= Peter Wishart (cricketer) =

Australian cricketer

Personal information
- Born: 18 June 1937 (age 89); Perth, Western Australia
- Batting: Left-handed
- Source: Cricinfo, 3 November 2017

Peter Wishart (born 18 June 1937) is an Australian cricketer. He played 26 first-class matches for Western Australia between 1959/60 and 1964/65, scoring 1105 runs with six half centuries and a top score of 115.
