= List of Western Australia cricketers =

The following articles contain lists of cricketers who have played for the Western Australian cricket team, organised by format:

- List of Western Australia first-class cricketers
- List of Western Australia List A cricketers
- List of Western Australia Twenty20 cricketers

== See also ==
- List of Western Australia cricket captains
- Western Australia Combined XI
- List of Perth Scorchers cricketers
- List of Perth Scorchers (WBBL) cricketers
