= Football Hall of Fame Western Australia =

Football Hall of Fame Western Australia was formed in 1996 to promote, preserve and protect the history of soccer in Western Australia.

== Hall of Legends ==
Name	Year inducted
Ron Adair	2005
Sandra Brentnall	2012
Robbie Dunn	2005
Gary Marocchi	2005
John McInroy	2005
Alan Vest	2016
Robert Zabica	2012

== Hall of Champions ==
Name	Year inducted
Alan Beale	1996
Alex Marr	1996
Alistair Edwards	2008
Allan Pottier	2012
Anna Senjuschenko	1996
Arno Bertogna	2002
Bobby Despotovski	2012
Chris Wissink	2005
Con Purser	1996
Craig Naven	2008
David Jones	1996
David O'Callaghan	1996
Denis Barstow	2002
Don McArdle	1996
Eric Edmonds	2005
Frank McShane	1996
Gareth Naven	2008
Gary Marocchi	1996
Gary Mateljan	2005
Graham Oughton	1996
Hugh Miller	1996
Jack Conduit	1996
Jack Smethurst	1996
James Gordon	1996
John Davidson	1996
John Henderson	1996
John McInroy	1996
John O'Connell	1996
John Spanos	2005
John Van Oosten	2005
Judy Pettitt	2012
Julie Gorton	2012
Len Dundo	1996
Luciana De Lenno	2008
Mike Ireson	2002
Nick McCallum	2005
Nino Segon	2005
Norrie Sutton	2008
Paul Sobek	2002
Peter Holt	1996
Peter Mitchell	2002
Ray Ilott	1996
Richard Kuzimski	2005
Robbie Dunn	2002
Robert Cherry	1996
Robert Zabica	2008
Ron Adair	1996
Ronnie Campbell	2008
Roy Jones	2005
Royston Evans	2002
Sandra Brentnall	1996
Sauro Iozzelli	2002
Saverio Madaschi	2002
Scott Miller	2012
Sharon Mateljan	1996
Shaun Murphy	2008
Stan Lazaridis	2012
Steven Sceats	1996
Stewart Johnson	1996
Teresa White	2008
Theo Paap	1996
Tommy Maras	2008
Tony Franken	2012
Tony Witschge	2002
Tracey Wheeler	2008
Wally Gardner	2012
William Waddell	1996
Willie McNally	2012
Zygmunt Pieda	2002

== Hall of Merit for Players ==
Name	Year inducted
Alex Senjuschenko	
Dave Roxby	
David Kamasz	
Frank Reid	
Geoff Cole	
Harold Boys	
Rene de Koning	

== Hall of Recognition ==
Name	Year inducted
Alan Robertson	
Alan Vest	
Aleck Peters	
Alex Mansfield	
Alex McDowall	
Barbara Rogoysky	
Barry Harwood	
Bob McShane	
Bob Watson	
Claude Eayrs	
David Andrews	
David Mortimer	
David Schrandt	
David Woodfin	
Dick Fearon	
Domenic Italiano	
Doug Grant	
Eddie Evans	
Eddie Lennie	
Eric Thomas	
Eric Williams	
Frank Kettell	
Marilyn Kettell	
Frank Miller	
Fred Newton	
Graham Normanton	
Harry Croft	
Henk Beumer	
Ivan Garic	
John Bleach	
John Van Hoek	
John Venn	
John Ward	
Julius Re	
Lou Ricci	
Mal Brown	
Marilyn Learmont	
Mick Mateljan	
Oscar Mate	
Barbara Gibson	
Peter Dimopoulos	
Peter Rickers	
Rita Richardson	
Roger Lefort	
Roger Males	
Ron Moss	
Ron Oswald	
Ron Tindall	
Roy Stedman	
Salvatore Scuito	
Stan Power	
Stuart Kamasz	
Ted Gray	
Tom D’Orsogna	
Zyggie Kramer	
