= List of Western Australia cricket captains =

This is a list of people who have captained Western Australia at the first-class, List A and Twenty20 formats of cricket. In total, 61 different players have captained Western Australia at some form of the game. Mitchell Marsh is currently the team's captain, with Adam Voges having retired at the end of the 2016/17 season . At Twenty20 level, Western Australia does not currently compete, being replaced by the Perth Scorchers from the 2011–12 season. Statistics are correct as of 12 January 2014:

== First-class ==
№	Name	Nationality	First	Last	M	W	L	D	T	Win %
1	Herbert Orr	England	1892–93	1892–93	2	0	2	0	0	0.00%
2	Bill Moore	Australia	1898–99	1898–99	1	0	1	0	0	0.00%
3	Karl Quist	Australia	1905–06	1905–06	2	1	0	1	0	50.00%
4	Harold Evers	Australia	1906–07	1920–21	10	1	4	5	0	10.00%
5	Thomas Hogue	Australia	1907–08	1908–09	2	0	0	2	0	0.00%
6	Arthur Christian	Australia	1908–09	1921–22	5	1	3	1	0	20.00%
7	Leonidas Bott	Australia	1922–23	1924–25	2	0	0	2	0	0.00%
8	Harold Rowe	Australia	1922–23	1929–30	7	0	7	0	0	0.00%
9	Mac Evans	Australia	1924–25	1924–25	1	0	1	0	0	0.00%
10	Robert Hewson	Australia	1925–26	1931–32	2	0	2	0	0	0.00%
11	Patrick Quinlan	Australia	1926–27	1926–27	1	0	1	0	0	0.00%
12	James Herbert	Australia	1926–27	1926–27	1	0	1	0	0	0.00%
13	Arthur Richardson	Australia	1927–28	1928–29	3	0	0	3	0	0.00%
14	Dick Bryant	Australia	1929–30	1935–36	16	0	5	11	0	0.00%
15	Ossie Lovelock	Australia	1936–37	1936–37	1	0	1	0	0	0.00%
16	William Rowlands	Australia	1937–38	1938–39	6	0	4	2	0	0.00%
17	Merv Inverarity	Australia	1939–40	1939–40	2	0	0	2	0	0.00%
18	Douglas McKenzie	Australia	1945–46	1945–46	1	0	0	1	0	0.00%
19	George Robinson	Australia	1946–47	1946–47	1	0	0	1	0	0.00%
20	Keith Carmody	Australia	1947–48	1955–56	35	7	17	11	0	20.00%
21	Allan Edwards	Australia	1950–51	1950–51	2	0	1	1	0	0.00%
22	Wally Langdon	Australia	1952–53	1952–53	6	1	3	2	0	16.66%
23	Ken Meuleman	Australia	1955–56	1960–61	34	7	11	16	0	20.59%
24	John Rutherford	Australia	1958–59	1960–61	2	1	0	1	0	50.00%
25	Bob Simpson	Australia	1960–61	1960–61	4	2	0	2	0	50.00%
26	Laurie Sawle	Australia	1960–61	1960–61	4	0	2	2	0	50.00%
27	Barry Shepherd	Australia	1961–62	1965–66	37	7	15	15	0	18.92%
28	Murray Vernon	Australia	1962–63	1966–67	9	1	6	2	0	11.11%
29	Graham McKenzie	Australia	1963–64	1963–64	1	0	0	1	0	0.00%
30	Tony Lock	England	1963–64	1970–71	38	14	11	13	0	36.84%
31	John Inverarity	Australia	1971–72	1978–79	52	25	13	14	0	48.08%
32	Ian Brayshaw	Australia	1971–72	1976–77	5	3	2	0	0	60.00%
33	Rod Marsh	Australia	1975–76	1983–84	20	9	4	7	0	45.00%
34	Ric Charlesworth	Australia	1978–79	1979–80	4	2	1	1	0	50.00%
35	Tony Mann	Australia	1979–80	1979–80	6	2	3	1	0	33.33%
36	Kim Hughes	Australia	1980–81	1984–85	29	14	7	8	0	48.28%
37	Ken McEwan	South Africa	1980–81	1980–81	2	1	0	1	0	50.00%
38	Greg Shipperd	Australia	1981–82	1984–85	7	1	0	6	0	14.29%
39	Craig Serjeant	Australia	1981–82	1982–83	9	1	2	6	0	11.11%
40	Bruce Laird	Australia	1982–83	1983–84	3	0	0	3	0	0.00%
41	Dennis Lillee	Australia	1983–84	1983–84	3	2	0	1	0	66.66%
42	Wayne Clark	Australia	1984–85	1984–85	1	0	1	0	0	0.00%
43	Graeme Wood	Australia	1985–86	1989–90	54	20	8	26	0	37.04%
44	Mike Veletta	Australia	1988–89	1991–92	8	3	2	3	0	37.50%
45	Wayne Andrews	Australia	1989–90	1990–91	10	2	4	4	0	20.00%
46	Geoff Marsh	Australia	1990–91	1993–94	31	12	8	11	0	38.71%
47	Damien Martyn	Australia	1994–95	2005–06	20	5	10	5	0	25.00%
48	Tom Moody	Australia	1994–95	2000–01	42	20	8	14	0	47.62%
49	Adam Gilchrist	Australia	1996–97	2002–03	11	4	4	3	0	36.36%
50	Brendon Julian	Australia	1997–98	1999–00	5	1	2	2	0	20.00%
51	Justin Langer	Australia	1998–99	2006–07	34	14	11	9	0	41.18%
52	Michael Hussey	Australia	2002–03	2012–13	17	6	4	7	0	35.29%
53	Jo Angel	Australia	2002–03	2002–03	2	0	1	1	0	0.00%
54	Murray Goodwin	Zimbabwe	2003–04	2003–04	1	0	1	0	0	0.00%
55	Marcus North	Australia	2005–06	2012–13	40	14	19	17	0	35.00%
56	Adam Voges	Australia	2007–08	2013–14	27	10	13	4	0	37.04%
57	Shaun Marsh	Australia	2013–14	2013–14	2	0	0	2	0	0.00%

== List A ==
№	Name	Nationality	First	Last	M	W	T	L	N/R	Win %
1	Tony Lock	England	1969–70	1970–71	6	4	0	1	1	80.00%
2	John Inverarity	Australia	1971–72	1978–79	13	9	0	4	0	69.23%
3	Rod Marsh	Australia	1975–76	1979–80	9	7	0	2	0	77.78%
4	Tony Mann	Australia	1979–80	1979–80	1	0	0	1	0	0.00%
5	Kim Hughes	Australia	1980–81	1984–85	17	12	0	5	0	70.58%
6	Ken McEwan	South Africa	1980–81	1980–81	1	0	0	1	0	0.00%
7	Craig Serjeant	Australia	1981–82	1981–82	2	2	0	0	0	100.00%
8	Dennis Lillee	Australia	1983–84	1983–84	1	0	0	1	0	0.00%
9	Graeme Wood	Australia	1985–86	1989–90	20	13	1	5	1	71.05%
10	Wayne Andrews	Australia	1987–88	1989–90	4	2	0	2	0	50.00%
11	Geoff Marsh	Australia	1989–90	1993–94	25	16	0	5	0	64.00%
12	Mike Veletta	Australia	1992–93	1992–93	1	0	0	1	0	0.00%
13	Damien Martyn	Australia	1994–95	2005–06	11	4	0	7	0	36.36%
14	Mark Lavender	Australia	1994–95	1994–95	1	1	0	0	0	100.00%
15	Tom Moody	Australia	1995–96	2000–01	32	20	0	10	2	66.67%
16	Brendon Julian	Australia	1996–97	1999–00	7	3	0	4	0	42.86%
17	Justin Langer	Australia	1998–99	2006–07	43	29	0	13	1	69.05%
18	Adam Gilchrist	Australia	1999–00	2002–03	7	5	0	2	2	71.43%
19	Simon Katich	Australia	2001–02	2001–02	4	2	0	2	0	50.00%
20	Michael Hussey	Australia	2002–03	2012–13	16	9	0	7	0	56.25%
21	Marcus North	Australia	2005–06	2012–13	35	15	0	20	0	42.86%
22	Adam Voges	Australia	2007–08	2015–16	23	8	0	15	0	34.78%
23	Brett Dorey	Australia	2008–09	2008–09	1	0	0	1	0	0.00%
24	Luke Ronchi	Australia	2011–12	2011–12	1	0	0	1	0	0.00%
25	Michael Beer	Australia	2013–14	2013–14	6	1	0	5	0	16.67%

== Twenty20 ==
№	Name	Nationality	First	Last	M	W	L	T	N/R	Win %
1	Marcus North	Australia	2005–06	2010–11	15	8	7	0	0	53.33%
2	Adam Voges	Australia	2005–06	2010–11	13	7	6	0	0	53.85%

== See also ==
- List of Western Australia first-class cricketers
- List of Western Australia List A cricketers
- List of Western Australia Twenty20 cricketers
