= Zygmunt Pieda =

Polish footballer (born 1933)

Personal information
- Full name: Zygmunt Pieda
- Date of birth: 23 April 1933 (age 93)
- Place of birth: Szopienice, Poland
- Height: 1.70 m (5 ft 7 in)
- Position: Forward

Senior career*
Years	Team	Apps	(Gls)
- KS Mała Dąbrówka
1952–1954	Unia Chorzów		
1954–1955	Legia Warsaw	32	(2)
1956–1964	Ruch Chorzów		
1965–1970	Cracovia		

Managerial career
- Cracovia
- Western Australia
- Morley-Windmills
- Inglewood Kiev
- Osborne Park
- * Club domestic league appearances and goals

Zygmunt Pieda (born 23 April 1933) is a Polish former footballer.

== Playing career ==
=== Poland ===
Pieda played for Ruch Chorzów and Legia Warsaw in a twelve-year career in the Polish Ekstraklasa, captaining Legia to a cup and league double in 1955.

=== Australia ===
In 1966 he was lured along with countrymen Paweł Sobek, Henryk Lukoszek and Władysław Musiał to Australia to play for struggling Perth team Cracovia. After one season the team won the State League.

== Honours ==
=== Individual ===
- D'Orsogna Cup Man of the Match: 1967
- Football Hall of Fame Western Australia Hall of Champions Inducted: 2002
- Football Hall of Fame Western Australia Century of Champions, The 1960s

=== Club ===
Legia Warsaw

- Ekstraklasa Winner: 1955
- Polish Cup Winner: 1955

Cracovia

- Western Australia State League: 1966
- D'Orsogna Cup Winner: 1967
- Night Series Winner: 1967
