= Mac Evans =

Australian sportsman

Personal information
- Full name: Royston Macauley Evans
- Born: 13 January 1884; Adelaide, South Australia
- Died: 12 March 1977 (aged 93); Perth, Western Australia
- Batting: Right-handed
- Bowling: Right-arm medium
- Role: All-rounder

Domestic team information
- Years: Team
- 1906/07–1924/25: Western Australia
- FC debut: 16 March 1907 Western Australia v New South Wales
- Last FC: 25 October 1924 Western Australia v MCC

Career statistics
Competition	First-class
Matches	11
Runs scored	270
Batting average	15.00
100s/50s	0/0
Top score	34*
Balls bowled	400
Wickets	1
Bowling average	214.00
5 wickets in innings	0
10 wickets in match	0
Best bowling	1/33
Catches/stumpings	6/–
- Source: CricketArchive, 14 October 2011

Royston Macauley Evans (13 January 1884 – 12 March 1977) was an Australian sportsman. He played both cricket and soccer for Western Australia. As a cricketer, Evans played 11 first-class matches for the Western Australian state team between 1907 and 1924. Playing as an all-rounder, Evans batted right-handed and bowled right-arm medium. He made 270 runs at an average of 15.00, and took one wicket, at an average of 214.00. He captained the side against the MCC in October 1924. He also played cricket for the North Perth Cricket Club in the WACA District competition.

As a soccer player, Evans was involved in the early history of the game in Western Australia. He formed the Rangers club in 1905, and was included in the state team's first interstate tour, in 1909, playing in all ten games. After World War I, he served as an administrator in the Soccer Football Association of Western Australia, as an executive and vice-president. He later served as Chief Traffic Manager of Western Australian Government Railways, before being appointed president of the WA Soccer Association in 1953. He was inducted into the Football Hall of Fame Western Australia in 2002.

== See also ==
- List of Western Australia cricket captains
