= Cracovia SC =

Cracovia Soccer Club
- Nickname: White Eagles
- Short name: Cracovia
- Founded: 1955
- Ground: Cracovia Club
- League: Football West Amateur League Division 2
- 2017: 7th

Cracovia Soccer Club is a football team based in Beechboro, Western Australia, and is the footballing arm of the Cracovia Club, a Polish Australian community organisation.

== History ==
The club was formed in 1950 at St Brigid's Parish Hall by members of the Perth Polish Australian community. The club was named Polish Sport Club Cracovia after the city of Kraków in Poland. It is a name shared by Polish team Cracovia. The club was initially based in Perth before moving to premises in Barlee Street, Highgate in 1972. The club was based in Highgate until 1990 when it moved to its current location in Beechboro.

=== Success ===
In 1965, after a number of seasons in the lower divisions of the Western Australia State League, Cracovia with the assistance of the Polish Olympic Committee recruited a number of seasoned Polish footballers including Władysław Musiał, Paweł Sobek, Zygmunt Pieda and Henryk Lukoszek. Success was immediate with Cracovia winning the first division in 1965 and the State League in 1966.

=== Decline ===
After a decade near the top of the State League Cracovia were relegated in 1974. From that point the club's success was limited to brief spells in the top flight before leaving the semi-professional competition in the mid-90s to compete in the state amateur competition.

During the early 1980s Bobby Moore played one match as a guest for Cracovia.

Due to regulations of the state soccer federation the club was known as Beechboro White Eagles in the 1990s.

=== Current ===
As of 2025, the club plays in the Amateur League Division 1.
