= Stadion Lechii =

Stadion Lechii may refer to:

- Stadion Energa Gdańsk
- Gdańsk Sports Center Stadium
