= Leonidas Bott =

Australian cricketer and engineer

Personal information
- Full name: Leonidas Cecil Bott
- Born: 14 July 1889; Adelaide, South Australia
- Died: 21 August 1969 (aged 80); Perth, Western Australia
- Batting: Right-handed
- Bowling: Right-arm medium
- Role: Batsman

Domestic team information
- Years: Team
- 1912/13–1925/26: Western Australia
- FC debut: 25 October 1912 Western Australia v South Australia
- Last FC: 21 November 1925 Western Australia v South Australia

Career statistics
Competition	First-class
Matches	14
Runs scored	400
Batting average	16.66
100s/50s	0/1
Top score	54
Balls bowled	214
Wickets	4
Bowling average	31.75
5 wickets in innings	0
10 wickets in match	0
Best bowling	2/3
Catches/stumpings	7/–
- Source: CricketArchive, 14 November 2011

Leonidas Cecil Bott (14 July 1889 – 21 August 1968) was an Australian cricketer and engineer who played 14 first-class matches for Western Australia between 1912 and 1925.

Born in Adelaide, Bott was educated at Perth Boys' School and Christian Brothers' College, and later received a scholarship to study at the University of Adelaide. He played WACA grade cricket with North Fremantle, Perth, North Perth and Mount Lawley, and also played a number of games for Western Australia before and after the First World War, captaining the side in two matches in 1922 and 1924. He was named in the Perth Cricket Club Team of the Century in 2012.

Bott worked as an engineer, and was involved in the construction of the Kalgoorlie–Port Augusta railway in 1912. He later served as assistant-superintending engineer at the Victorian Postmaster-General's Department. In 1953, he was awarded the Coronation Medal of Queen Elizabeth II.

== See also ==
- List of Western Australia cricket captains
