= Sam Whiteman (Australian cricketer) =

Australian cricketer (born 1992)

Personal information
- Full name: Sam McFarlane Whiteman
- Born: 19 March 1992 (age 34); Doncaster, South Yorkshire, England
- Batting: Left-handed
- Role: Batter

Domestic team information
- Years: Team
- 2012/13–Present: Western Australia (squad no. 9)
- 2013/14–2019/20: Perth Scorchers (squad no. 9)
- 2021/22–2022/23: Sydney Thunder (squad no. 3)
- 2023: Northamptonshire (squad no. 6)
- 2026–: Yorkshire (squad no. 4)
- FC debut: 1 November 2012 WA v Victoria
- LA debut: 16 September 2012 WA v New South Wales

Career statistics
Competition	FC	LA	T20
Matches	136	85	59
Runs scored	7,532	2,429	836
Batting average	33.62	36.80	16.72
100s/50s	18/34	2/17	0/3
Top score	193	137*	68
Catches/stumpings	207/6	46/4	28/6
- Source: Cricinfo, 25 October 2026

Sam McFarlane Whiteman (born 19 March 1992) is an English-born-Australian cricketer currently contracted to Western Australia and the Perth Scorchers. He has also played for Australia A. Whiteman is a wicket-keeper who bats left-handed.

== Early life ==
Born in Doncaster, South Yorkshire, Whiteman emigrated with his family to Western Australia at an early age, and was raised in Bunbury, in the state's south-west region. Playing cricket from an early age, he toured England with an Australian Schools under-16 representative team during the 2007 English cricket season, aged 15. Whiteman played representative cricket for Western Australia at both under-17 and under-19 level, and also played several games for the Australian under-19 cricket team in 2009, against the Indian and Sri Lankan under-19 teams. In 2010, he was awarded the Adam Gilchrist Cricket Development Scholarship, which allowed him to spend the 2010 season playing for the Weybridge Cricket Club in the Surrey Championship, as well as playing several Second XI matches for the Surrey County Cricket Club. He led Weybridge's runs totals during the season, scoring 572 runs at an average of 44.00.

== Domestic career ==
Having also played for Western Australia's under-23 side in the Futures League, Whiteman was awarded a Western Australian Cricket Association (WACA) rookie contract for the 2012–13 season. He made his debut for Western Australia in the 2012–13 Ryobi One-Day Cup against New South Wales, scoring 31 runs. His first half-century, an innings of 74, came in a Ryobi Cup match against South Australia, and was Western Australia's highest score of the match. Whiteman's highest score at first-class level, 96 runs, was achieved opening the batting against Tasmania in November 2012. Although usually playing as a wicket-keeper, Whiteman played his first few matches at state level as a specialist batsman, although towards the end of the season he took over from Tom Triffitt as Western Australia's first-choice wicket-keeper. At grade cricket level, Whiteman plays for the Rockingham-Mandurah District Cricket Club, having made his first-grade debut during the 2007–08 season, at the age of 15.

In April 2014, Whiteman was selected in the Australia A squad for the 2014 off-season, with the team playing series against India A and South Africa A. In the first match between Australia A and India A, played in July 2014 at Allan Border Field, he scored 174 runs batting eighth in Australia's first innings, his first century at first-class level. Whiteman and Mitchell Marsh, who scored 211 runs, put on 371 runs for the seventh wicket, an Australian record and the second-highest seventh-wicket partnership recorded, behind the 460-run record set by Bhupinder Singh and Pankaj Dharmani during the 1994–95 season. The previous Australian record, set by Queenslanders Cassie Andrews and Eric Bensted, had stood since the 1934–35 season.

Whiteman suffered a serious injury whilst keeping wicket to Mitchell Johnson in the BBL final. Repeated surgeries on his hand followed. He returned in 2018 to the Scorchers squad as a batsman only after playing a couple of games for WA Premier Cricket side Fremantle, and played 2 matches in Big Bash 7 after a year out of the game.

== English County Cricket ==
Whiteman played for Northamptonshire County Cricket Club during part of the 2023 English season. In January 2026, he signed a three-year contract with Yorkshire County Cricket Club.
