= List of Perth Scorchers cricketers =

The Perth Scorchers are an Australian cricket franchise who play in the Big Bash League, the national domestic Twenty20 competition. The club was established in 2011 as an inaugural member of the eight-club league. The Big Bash League consists of a regular season and a finals series of the top four teams. The two "Big finalists" earn the right to compete in the international Twenty20 tournament called the Champions League Twenty20 (CLT20). This list includes players who have played at least one match for the Scorchers in the Big Bash League and the Champions League Twenty20.

== List of players ==
Correct as of 26 January 2026.

Players are listed according to the date of their debut for the Scorchers. All statistics are for Big Bash League and Champions League Twenty20 only.

- The number to the left of player name represents 'cap'. For players who debuted for club in the same match, player caps are ordered by alphabetical order of last name.
- In category "Debut" games are listed as Tournament/Round. e.g. BBL02/8 would equate to 2012–13 Big Bash League, Perth Scorchers' 8th Match of the tournament or CLT20(2012)/1 would be 2012 Champions League Twenty20, Round 1 (of Group stage).
- Hover over column headings for key
- Current squad members are in bold

Player							Batting				Fielding		Bowling				
	Player	National team	Seasons	Debut	Championships	Mat	Runs	HS	Ave	SR	Ct	St	Wkts	BBI	Ave	Econ	SR
1	Michael Beer	Australia	2011-2014	BBL01/1		33	16	7	4.00	55.17	6	-	25	3/13	27.76	6.25	26.6
2	Paul Collingwood	England	2011-2012	BBL01/1		10	151	38	18.87	126.89	-	-	0	-	-	11.75	-
3	Ben Edmondson	Australia	2011-2012	BBL01/1		11	0	0*	0.00	0.00	3	-	15	4/40	24.26	8.98	16.2
4	Herschelle Gibbs	South Africa	2011-2013	BBL01/1		20	519	71	27.31	135.15	7	-	-	-	-	-	-
5	Brad Hogg	Australia	2011-2016	BBL01/1	BBL03, BBL04	54	59	28*	8.42	105.35	15	-	51	4/29	23.66	6.28	22.5
6	Michael Hussey	Australia	2011-2013	BBL01/1		4	35	21*	11.66	97.22	3	-	-	-	-	-	-
7	Simon Katich	Australia	2011-2014	BBL01/1	BBL03,	37	627	75	26.12	120.80	12	-	-	-	-	-	-
8	**Mitchell Marsh**	Australia	2011-2026	BBL01/1	BBL03, BBL11, BBL15	90	2467	102	37.95	133.20	37	-	27	2/10	37.07	8.81	25.2
9	Marcus North	Australia	2011-2013	BBL01/1		23	442	70	31.57	107.80	7	-	0	-	-	22.00	-
10	Nathan Rimmington	Australia	2011-2012	BBL01/1		11	37	22	12.33	115.62	3	-	11	2/18	24.72	7.45	19.9
11	Luke Ronchi	Australia	2011-2012	BBL01/1		13	80	34	8.00	100.00	9	5	-	-	-	-	-
12	Shaun Marsh	Australia	2011-2019	BBL01/2	BBL03, BBL04	40	1519	99*	47.46	127.21	14	-	-	-	-	-	-
13	Nathan Coulter-Nile	Australia	2011-2019	BBL01/3	BBL03, BBL04	43	318	42*	18.70	145.20	11	-	50	3/9	23.14	7.55	18.3
14	Tom Beaton	Australia	2012	BBL01/6		2	22	22	22.00	115.78	1	-	-	-	-	-	-
15	Josh Lalor	Australia	2012	BBL01/7		1	-	-	-	-	-	-	0	-	-	13.50	-
16	Joe Mennie	Australia	2012-2013	CLT20(2012)/1		7	6	2	1.50	27.27	1	-	6	2/21	23.66	7.28	19.5
17	Ryan Duffield	Australia	2012	CLT20(2012)/4		1	-	-	-	-	-	-	1	1/17	17.00	5.66	18.0
18	Tom Triffitt	Australia	2012-2013	BBL02/1		12	35	25	5.00	92.10	7	1	-	-	-	-	-
19	Adam Voges	Australia	2012-2018	BBL02/1	BBL03, BBL04, BBL06	54	1129	71*	31.36	125.16	26	-	4	1/12	28.00	8.61	19.5
20	Hilton Cartwright	Australia	2012-2019	BBL02/2	BBL06	37	558	68*	23.25	106.89	11	-	2	2/41	45.50	11.14	24.5
21	Marcus Stoinis	Australia	2012-2013	BBL02/2		3	10	9	5.00	83.33	1	-	-	-	-	-	-
22	Alfonso Thomas	South Africa	2012-2014	BBL02/3	BBL03	16	8	3	2.00	50.00	10	-	16	4/8	24.81	7.26	20.5
23	Jason Behrendorff	Australia	2012-2025	BBL02/5	BBL03, BBL04, BBL11, BBL12	112	121	26	13.44	104.31	38	-	148	4/22	19.45	7.12	16.3
24	**Ashton Agar**	Australia	2013-2026	CLT20(2013)/1	BBL06, BBL11	108	877	68	15.94	115.39	57	-	73	3/19	32.89	7.38	26.7
25	Liam Davis	Australia	2013	CLT20(2013)/1		3	18	1	9.00	138.46	1	-	-	-	-	-	-
26	**Joel Paris**	Australia	2013-2026	CLT20(2013)/1		32	43	20*	8.60	91.48	12	-	31	3/22	28.51	8.61	19.8
27	**Ashton Turner**	Australia	2013-2026	CLT20(2013)/1	BBL04, BBL06, BBL11, BBL12, BBL15	149	2587	99*	26.94	146.48	56	-	20	2/1	22.65	7.42	18.3
28	Burt Cockley	Australia	2013	CLT20(2013)/2		1	-	-	-	-	-	-	0	-	-	15.00	-
29	Sam Whiteman	Australia	2013-2024	CLT20(2013)/4	BBL03, BBL04, BBL06	49	711	68	17.34	120.3	26	6	-	-	-	-	-
30	Yasir Arafat	Pakistan	2013-2015	BBL03/2	BBL04	20	60	18*	12.00	113.20	1	-	33	4/24	19.03	8.24	13.8
31	Tim Armstrong	Australia	2013	BBL03/2		2	14	11	7.00	70.00	2	-	-	-	-	-	-
32	Craig Simmons	Australia	2014	BBL03/4	BBL03	11	378	112	34.36	152.41	2	-	-	-	-	-	-
33	Patrick Cummins	Australia	2014	BBL03/7	BBL03	4	10	7	5.00	100.00	2	-	4	2/6	32.75	10.07	19.5
34	Cameron Bancroft	Australia	2014-2023	CLT20(2014)/4	BBL12	69	1617	95*	33.68	124.09	34	4	-	-	-	-	-
35	Michael Carberry	England	2014-2016	BBL04/1	BBL04	15	353	77*	35.30	127.43	3	-	-	-	-	-	-
36	Marcus Harris	Australia	2014-2024	BBL04/1		15	241	53	18.53	118.71	5	-	-	-	-	-	-
37	Michael Klinger	Australia	2014-2019	BBL04/1	BBL04, BBL06	49	1284	105*	28.53	117.26	17	-	-	-	-	-	-
38	James Muirhead	Australia	2014-2018	BBL04/1		3	-	-	-	-	1	-	2	1/14	34.00	8.50	24.0
39	Andrew Tye	Australia	2014–2025	BBL04/1	BBL04, BBL06, BBL11, BBL12	114	264	44	12.00	116.48	38	-	159	5/23	20.28	7.98	15.2
40	Matthew Dixon	Australia	2014-2016	BBL04/2		4	0	0	0.00	0.00	-	-	6	3/32	22.00	8.25	16.0
41	David Willey	England	2015-2019	BBL05/1		27	229	55	14.31	108.01	9	-	26	3/22	24.26	7.42	19.6
42	**Jhye Richardson**	Australia	2016-2026	BBL05/8	BBL06, BBL11, BBL15	82	321	33*	15.28	120.22	23	-	113	4/9	20.91	7.89	15.8
43	Ian Bell	England	2016-2017	BBL06/1	BBL06	10	231	61	33.00	126.92	1	-	-	-	-	-	-
44	Mitchell Johnson	Australia	2016-2018	BBL06/1	BBL06	19	4	4*	-	66.66	7	-	20	3/3	22.75	6.14	22.2
45	Tim Bresnan	England	2017-2018	BBL06/6	BBL06	10	70	43	70.00	159.09	4	-	17	3/40	18.11	8.47	12.8
46	Will Bosisto	Australia	2017-2019	BBL07/1		11	102	36*	14.57	97.14	3	-	1	1/9	44.00	7.33	36.0
47	**Josh Inglis**	Australia	2017-2026	BBL07/1	BBL11, BBL12, BBL15	83	1887	79	29.03	139.15	74	17	-	-	-	-	-
48	Josh Philippe	Australia	2017	BBL07/1		1	7	7	7	70	0	-	-	-	-	-	-
49	Tim David	Australia	2018-2020	BBL07/4		12	109	18	18.16	136.25	4	-	0	-	-	3	-
50	**Matthew Kelly**	Australia	2018-2025	BBL07/7	BBL12	39	95	23*	11.87	121.79	13	-	55	4/25	20.54	8.11	15.1
51	Usman Qadir	Pakistan	2018-2019	BBL08/1		7	9	5	9	47.36	1	-	6	1/25	33.83	8.45	24
52	**Aaron Hardie**	Australia	2019–2026	BBL08/7	BBL12, BBL15	73	1499	94*	37.40	133.48	31	-	38	3/31	26.26	8.37	18.8
53	Cameron Green	Australia	2019–2020	BBL08/8		13	106	36	15.14	108.16	4	-	0	-	-	10.5	-
54	**Nick Hobson**	Australia	2019–2026	BBL08/10	BBL12	46	554	48*	23.08	132.85	24	-	-	-	-	-	-
55	Clint Hinchliffe	Australia	2019	BBL08/12		3	12	9	12	70.58	0	-	1	1/21	62	7.75	48
56	Sean Terry	Ireland	2019	BBL08/14		1	4	4	4	80	1	-	-	-	-	-	-
57	Fawad Ahmed	Australia	2019-2020	BBL09/1		31	28	19	5.6	127.27	5	-	30	3/16	26.96	7.32	22.1
58	Chris Jordan	England	2019-2020	BBL09/1		13	45	11	5.62	93.75	9	-	15	3/28	24.93	8.69	17.2
59	Liam Livingstone	England	2019-2021	BBL09/1		28	851	79	30.39	138.14	10	-	9	2/4	16.55	8.2	12.1
60	Jaron Morgan	Australia	2020	BBL09/10		1	1	1	1	33.33	0	-	-	-	-	-	-
61	Kurtis Patterson	Australia	2020	BBL09/11	BBL11	18	430	78	28.66	138.7	14	-	-	-	-	-	-
62	Morné Morkel	South Africa	2020	BBL09/14		1	-	-	-	-	0	-	0	-	-	18	-
63	Colin Munro	New Zealand	2020–2022	BBL10/1	BBL11	29	833	114*	36.21	127.76	15	-	-	-	-	-	-
64	Joe Clarke	England	2020	BBL10/1		3	44	34	14.66	183.33	0	-	-	-	-	-	-
65	Jason Roy	England	2020–2021	BBL10/4		12	355	74*	32.27	130.51	6	-	-	-	-	-	-
66	**Laurie Evans**	England	2021–2026	BBL11/1	BBL11, BBL15	36	748	85*	37.40	160.17	11	2	-	-	-	-	-
67	Peter Hatzoglou	Australia	2021–2023	BBL11/1	BBL11	25	16	12*	-	106.66	4	-	23	3/14	27.17	7.35	22.1
68	Tymal Mills	England	2021–2022	BBL11/3		7	1	1*	-	100	1	-	12	3/23	15.83	7.35	12.9
69	**Lance Morris**	Australia	2021–2025	BBL11/7		28	1	1	0.50	20.00	6	-	39	5/24	19.53	7.78	15.0
70	Chris Sabburg	Australia	2022	BBL11/11		3	10	7*	10	100	0	-	-	-	-	-	-
71	David Moody	Australia	2022	BBL11/13		1	8	8	8	53.33	0	-	0	-	-	9	-
72	Faf du Plessis	South Africa	2022–2023	BBL12/1		7	163	68	23.28	153.77	4	-	-	-	-	-	-
73	Adam Lyth	England	2022–2023	BBL12/1		7	73	35	10.42	96.05	3	-	-	-	-	-	-
74	Stephen Eskinazi	England	2023–2024	BBL12/8	BBL12	13	258	66*	23.45	119.44	9	-	-	-	-	-	-
75	**Cooper Connolly**	Australia	2023–2026	BBL12/8	BBL12, BBL15	37	786	77	30.23	17.41	17	-	27	3/23	18.25	6.84	16.0
76	**David Payne**	England	2023–2026	BBL12/10	BBL12, BBL15	12	6	5*	3.0	85.71	8	-	21	3/18	15.23	6.95	13.1
77	Hamish McKenzie	Australia	2023–2024	BBL13/1		4	6	6	6	120	-	-	2	2/12	30.5	6.1	30.0
78	Zak Crawley	England	2023–2024	BBL13/3		6	155	65*	31.00	108.39	1	-	-	-	-	-	-
79	**Sam Fanning**	Australia	2024–2026	BBL13/11		5	133	41	26.60	141.48	2	-	-	-	-	-	-
80	**Finn Allen**	New Zealand	2024–2026	BBL14/1	BBL15	21	647	101	30.80	184.33	13	1	-	-	-	-	-
81	Keaton Jennings	England	2024	BBL14/1		3	48	35	16.00	106.66	1	-	-	-	-	-	-
82	Matty Hurst	England	2024–2025	BBL14/1		5	64	28	12.8	91.42	6	1	-	-	-	-	-
83	Matthew Spoors	Australia Canada	2024–2025	BBL14/3		5	78	29	26.00	101.29	-	-	1	1/8	62.00	10.33	36.0
84	**Brody Couch**	Australia	2025–2026	BBL15/1	BBL15	8	5	5*	–	71.42	1	-	5	2/12	41.40	10.09	24.6
85	**Mahli Beardman**	Australia	2025–2026	BBL14/9	BBL15	13	2	2	2.00	33.33	4	-	16	3/17	20.43	7.97	15.3
86	**Joel Curtis**	Australia	2026	BBL15/6		1	1	1	1.00	50.00	1	-	-	-	-	-	-
87	**Luke Holt**	Australia	2026	BBL15/8		3	8	8*	–	200.0	2	-	1	1/22	52.00	10.40	30.0

Source: ESPN.cricinfo Scorchers Batting records and ESPN.cricinfo Scorcher Bowling & Fielding records

== See also ==
- List of Perth Scorchers (WBBL) cricketers
