= Lechia Gdańsk Ladies (football) =

Polish association football club

- Full name: Klub Sportowy Lechia Gdańsk Kobiet Spółka Akcyjna
- Nickname(s): Gdańskie Lwy (Gedanian Lions); Biało-Zieloni (White-Greens); Lechiści (Lechistas)
- Founded: June 2016; 9 years ago (as Biało-Zielone Gdańsk); June 2019; 6 years ago (Officially, since joining the Lechia Gdańsk Academy)
- Ground: Gdańsk Sports Center Stadium
- Capacity: 12,244
- Manager: Artur Kaim
- League: III liga, group II
- 2024–25: III liga, group II, 4th of 10
- Website: https://bialo-zielone-lechia-gd.futbolowo.pl/
Home colours	Away colours

Lechia Gdańsk Ladies (Polish: Lechia Gdańsk Kobiet), formerly known as Biało-Zielone Gdańsk, is the ladies football team for Lechia Gdańsk.

== History ==
The team were created in 2016 as Biało-Zielone Gdańsk and focused on football training for girls in youth teams. Biało-Zielone Gdańsk was closely linked with Lechia Gdańsk in its early years. After Lechia and AP Lotos Gdańsk, then known as Akademia Piłkarska Lechia Gdańsk, started having differences in how the academy should be run, the Biało-Zielone team allowed Lechia to have its own ladies team that was not associated with the team that Lechia and AP Lotos Gdańsk, with funding from Grupa Lotos, had created together in 2015. Biało-Zielone were created with the agreement that the team would eventually become part of the Lechia Gdańsk structure, and signed a long-term plan of being officially associated with Lechia Gdańsk in 2016. During the three years the club was known as Biało-Zielone Gdańsk the club won promotion to the II liga in their first season, and spent the following two seasons in the II liga.

It was announced in June 2019 that the "Biało-Zielone Gdańsk" team was to be officially incorporated into the Lechia Gdańsk Academy, leading to an official Lechia Gdańsk Ladies team, as well as girls teams for various age groups throughout the academy set-up. Due to the official affiliation with Lechia, the Ladies team would see increased funds for all footballing activities, as well as the use of better facilities, leading to the team to become more professional as a result. This incorporation would also see the team taking the Lechia Gdańsk name, changing from "Biało-Zielone Gdańsk" to "Lechia Gdańsk Kobiet".

The end of the 2018–19 season saw the full incorporation of the Lechia Gdańsk Ladies into the Lechia academy. This resulted in the newly created Lechia Gdańsk Ladies playing in the III liga for the 2019–20 season, due to Biało-Zielone's relegation in their final season.

=== Club names ===
- Biało-Zielone Gdańsk (2016–2019)
- KS Lechia Gdańsk Kobiet SA (2019–)

== Honours ==
=== III liga ===
- Runners-up (1): 2016–17 (Note: III liga (Pomeranian group).)
- Third place (1): 2021–22 (Note: III liga (group II).)

== Seasons ==
Season	League	Tier	Position	Matches	Points	W	D	L	GF	GA
Biało-Zielone Gdańsk
2016–17	III liga (Pomeranian group)	IV	2 of 10	18	41	13	2	3	71	23
2017–18	II liga (Group II)	III	11 of 12	22	6	2	0	20	28	103
2018–19	II liga (Group II)	III	12 of 12	22	2	0	2	20	27	97
Lechia Gdańsk
2019–20 (Note: The 2019–20 season did not resume after the winter break due to the coronavirus pandemic. The season was later cancelled with only half of the games having been played.)	III liga (Pomeranian group)	IV	1 of 10	9	23	7	2	0	51	5
2020–21	III liga (group II)	IV	4 of 12	22	50	16	2	4	86	27
2021–22	III liga (group II)	IV	3 of 11	20	45	14	3	3	80	29
2022–23	III liga (group II)	IV	4 of 11	20	40	13	1	6	79	30
2023–24	III liga (group II)	IV	7 of 10	18	16	5	1	12	40	79
2024–25	III liga (group II)	IV	4 of 10	18	31	10	1	7	59	48

† Season ongoing

== Stats ==
=== League top goalscorers ===
Season	Player(s)	Goals
2019–20	Oliwia Kasprowicz	14
2020–21	Zuzanna Łachinowicz	23
2021–22	Weronika Szmatuła	20
2022–23	Sara Podsiadło	11
