= Herbert Orr =

English cricketer

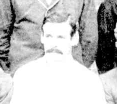
- Orr in 1927

Personal information
- Full name: Herbert Richard Orr
- Born: 3 February 1865; Kensington, London
- Died: 19 November 1940 (aged 75); St John's, Sevenoaks, Kent
- Batting: Right-handed
- Bowling: Right-arm slow
- Role: Batsman

Domestic team information
- Years: Team
- 1886–1887: Cambridge University
- 1892/93: Western Australia
- 1900–1921: Bedfordshire

Career statistics
Competition	FC
Matches	4
Runs scored	98
Batting average	12.25
100s/50s	0/0
Top score	44
Balls bowled	78
Wickets	0
Bowling average	–
5 wickets in innings	–
10 wickets in match	–
Best bowling	–
Catches/stumpings	2/–
- Source: CricketArchive, 17 July 2011

Herbert Richard Orr (3 February 1865 – 22 May 1940) was an English cricketer who played four first-class matches for Cambridge University and Western Australia between 1886 and 1892.

== Life and career ==
Born in Kensington in London, Orr was educated at Bedford School and Jesus College, Cambridge. He played for Cambridge University in 1886 and 1887. He played a single match for the Melbourne Cricket Club against Lord Sheffield's XI during the English team's 1891–92 tour, and later moved to Western Australia, where he was the state's inaugural cricket captain. Orr captained the team in each of its first two matches, with Western Australia losing both.

Returning to England in 1899, Orr was made a second lieutenant in the Cadet Corps (Bedford County School) in 1902, attached to the 1st Bedfordshire Regiment of the Royal Engineers. He went on to play 111 minor counties matches for Bedfordshire County Cricket Club between 1900 and 1921. His brothers, Rowland and John Orr, also represented Bedfordshire in minor counties matches. Orr died in Sevenoaks, Kent, in May 1940.
