= Ron Adair =

Association football player (1931–2026)

Personal information
- Date of birth: 2 June 1931
- Place of birth: Derry, Northern Ireland
- Date of death: 20 May 2026 (aged 94)
- Position: Defender

Youth career
- Victoria Park

Senior career*
Years	Team	Apps	(Gls)
1952–1953	North Perth		
1954	Maccabeans		
1955	Perth Azzurri		
1956	North Shore		
1957	Swan Athletic		

International career
1954–1958	Australia	13	(1)
- * Club domestic league appearances and goals

Ron Adair (2 June 1931 – 20 May 2026) was an association football player who played as a defender. Born in Northern Ireland, he made 13 appearances for the Australia national team, scoring once.

== Club career ==
Adair played his junior football for Victoria Park in Western Australia before joining North Perth in 1952. After playing two seasons for North Perth he joined Maccabeans for a season before transferring to Azzurri. In 1956 Adair played for North Shore in New South Wales before returning to WA to play for Swan Athletic.

== State career ==
Adair played 23 times for Western Australia, captaining the state 11 times.

== International career ==
Adair played three full international matches for the Australia national association football team between 1954 and 1958, scoring one goal. Adair captained Australia in two B-internationals - against Rapid Vienna in 1955 and Heart of Midlothian in 1959.

== Death ==
Adair died on 20 May 2026, at the age of 94.

== Honours ==
Individual

- Football Federation Australia - Football Hall of Fame Inductee: 1999
- Western Australian State League Best and Fairest: 1953, 1954, 1955
- Football Hall of Fame Western Australia Inductee: 2005
