= Władysław Musiał =

Polish footballer

Personal information
- Full name: Władysław Musiał
- Date of birth: 22 March 1931
- Place of birth: Poland
- Date of death: 20 December 2010 (aged 79)
- Place of death: Poland
- Height: 1.66 m (5 ft 5 1/2 in)
- Positions: Midfielder; utility player

Senior career*
Years	Team	Apps	(Gls)
1946–1950	Gedania Gdańsk		
1950–1953	Zawisza Bydgoszcz		
1953–1964	Lechia Gdańsk	204	(30)
1965–1968	Cracovia White Eagles		
- * Club domestic league appearances and goals

Władysław Musiał (22 March 1931 – 20 December 2010) was a Polish former footballer.

Musiał played for Lechia Gdańsk in the Polish Ekstraklasa.

In 1965 Musiał transferred to Australian club Cracovia where he played four seasons.

Musiał was recognised in the Football Hall of Fame Western Australia's team of the 1960s.

Musiał is commemorated by a star at the MOSiR Stadium in Gdańsk. The "Avenue of Stars" commemorates the efforts and success of former players and coaches.
