= Mitchell Marsh =

Australian cricketer (born 1991)

Mitch Marsh
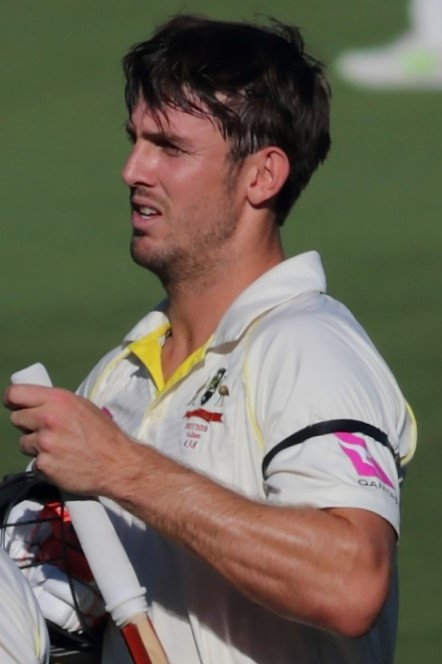
- Marsh in 2018

Personal information
- Full name: Mitchell Ross Marsh
- Born: 20 October 1991 (age 35); Attadale, Western Australia
- Nickname: Bison
- Height: 1.93 m (6 ft 4 in)
- Batting: Right-handed
- Bowling: Right-arm medium
- Role: Top-order batter
- Relatives: Geoff Marsh (father); Shaun Marsh (brother); Melissa Marsh (sister)

International information
- National side: Australia (2011–present)
- Test debut (cap 438): 22 October 2014 v Pakistan
- Last Test: 26 December 2024 v India
- ODI debut (cap 190): 19 October 2011 v South Africa
- Last ODI: 18 November 2026 v England
- ODI shirt no.: 8
- T20I debut (cap 54): 16 October 2011 v South Africa
- Last T20I: 21 November 2026 v England
- T20I shirt no.: 8

Domestic team information
- Years: Team
- 2008/09–present: Western Australia
- 2010: Deccan Chargers
- 2011–2013: Pune Warriors India
- 2011/12–present: Perth Scorchers
- 2016: Rising Pune Supergiant
- 2020: Sunrisers Hyderabad
- 2022–2024: Delhi Capitals
- 2025-2026: Lucknow Super Giants
- 2026–present: Sunrisers Leeds

Career statistics
Competition	Test	ODI	T20I	FC
Matches	46	108	89	122
Runs scored	2,083	3,448	2,350	6,415
Batting average	28.53	37.47	33.57	33.06
100s/50s	3/9	4/25	1/14	13/29
Top score	181	177*	103*	211
Balls bowled	3,483	2,213	300	9,425
Wickets	51	57	17	171
Bowling average	40.41	35.71	22.76	31.60
5 wickets in innings	1	1	0	2
10 wickets in match	0	0	0	0
Best bowling	5/46	5/33	3/24	6/84
Catches/stumpings	27/–	38/–	43/–	69/–
Medal record
Men's cricket
Representing Australia
ICC Cricket World Cup
Winner	2015 Australia and New Zealand
Winner	2023 India
ICC T20 World Cup
Winner	2021 UAE and Oman
U19 World Cup
Winner	2010 New Zealand
- Source: Cricinfo, 22 November 2026

Mitchell Ross Marsh (born 20 October 1991) is an Australian international cricketer who represents Australia in ODIs and captains in T20Is. Marsh previously played Test cricket, and has captained in ODIs and has served as vice captain in all formats. Marsh currently plays for Western Australia for domestic cricket, Perth Scorchers in the Big Bash League and the Lucknow Super Giants in the Indian Premier League.

Marsh was a member of the Australian teams that won the 2015 Cricket World Cup, 2021 T20 World Cup and vice-captain for the 2023 Cricket World Cup.

Marsh previously played for Deccan Chargers, Pune Warriors India, Sunrisers Hyderabad and Delhi Capitals.

== Early and personal life ==
Marsh is the second son of Geoff Marsh and younger brother of Shaun Marsh, both of whom have played for the Australian national team. His sister, Melissa Marsh, is a former professional basketball player and he is cousin to retired AFL player, Brad Sheppard. He was raised in Perth, Western Australia, where he attended Wesley College.

In addition to cricket, Marsh was also a talented Australian rules footballer in his youth and represented Western Australia at the 2008 AFL Under 18 Championships. Although a West Australian, Marsh has stated that he has always supported the North Melbourne Football Club

In April 2023, he married Greta Mack.

== Domestic career ==
Marsh made his debut for the Warriors at the age of 17 in February 2009 in a Ford Ranger Cup game at Bunbury. He became the youngest ever player in an Australian domestic one-day game and Western Australia's youngest debutant for 70 years. In April 2009, he played for Australia's under-19 team against India and was the team captain during the 2010 Under-19 Cricket World Cup. Under his leadership Australia won the tournament, Marsh having a successful tournament scoring 201 runs, including a match winning 97 in the semi-final against Sri Lanka.

Marsh was signed by Deccan Chargers for the 2010 Indian Premier League and in 2011 was bought by Pune Warriors, the team coached at the time by his father. He played for Pune for the three years that the team existed and in 2016 and 2017 played for Rising Pune Supergiants for the two seasons that team existed.

Playing for Australia A against India A in July 2014 at Allan Border Field, Marsh scored 211 runs batting seventh in Australia's first innings, his first double century. He and Sam Whiteman, who scored 174 runs, put on 371 runs for the seventh wicket, an Australian record and, at the time, the second-highest seventh-wicket partnership in first-class cricket. The previous Australian record, set by Queenslanders Cassie Andrews and Eric Bensted, had stood since the 1934–35 season.

In 2020, Marsh signed to play in England for Middlesex County Cricket Club in the 2020 t20 Blast competition, but the move was cancelled due to the rescheduling of the competition in the wake of the COVID-19 pandemic. He signed again for the 2021 season, but this move was also cancelled after Marsh was called up to play international cricket for Australia. He was bought by Sunrisers Hyderabad for the 2020 IPL, although he only played in one match of the competition due to injury, and he withdrew from the 2021 Indian Premier League due to bio-bubble fatigue during the pandemic.

In the 2022 IPL Auction, Marsh was bought by the Delhi Capitals. Marsh currently plays for Lucknow Super Giants in the IPL. Marsh was signed by the Seattle Orcas for the first edition of Major League Cricket in March 2023.

== International career ==
=== Debut years ===
In September 2011, Marsh was named in Australia's Twenty20 squad to tour South Africa. He was later added to the One Day International squad following Brett Lee's withdrawal due to injury. He made a spectacular debut for Australia in the second T20I match of the series, scoring 36 runs including four sixes, three of which were hit in the final over of the Australian innings. In August 2014, Marsh scored 89 runs against Zimbabwe in first match of the Tri-series at Harare Sports Club, adding 109 runs for the fourth wicket with Glenn Maxwell and contributing to partnerships of 47 and 33 with Aaron Finch and George Bailey. Later in the competition he scored 86 not out against South Africa.

Marsh made his Test match debut for Australia against Pakistan in the United Arab Emirates on 22 October 2014.

=== 2015–20 ===
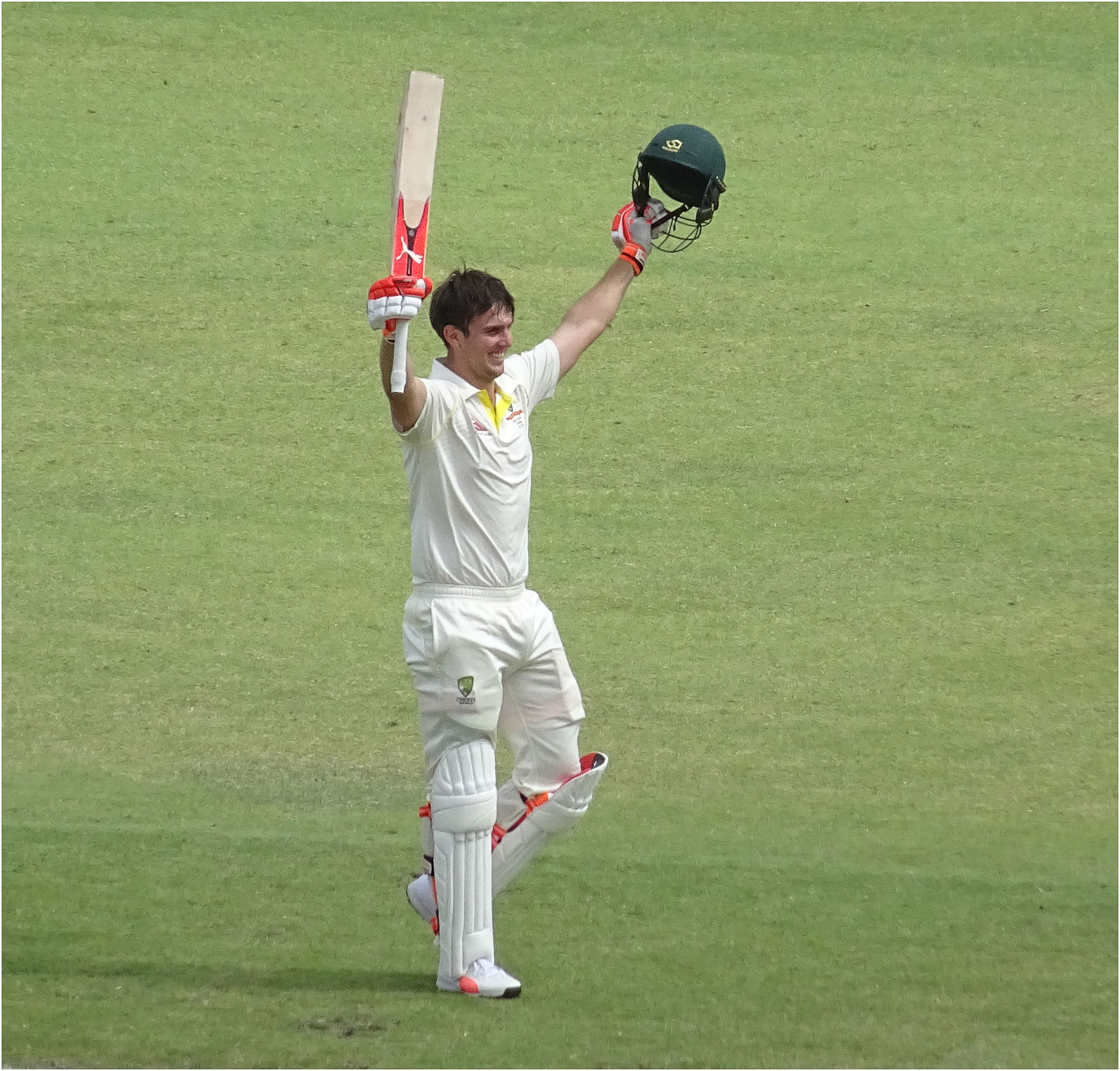
Marsh after his maiden Test century

Playing regularly in the One Day International team, Marsh took a five-wicket haul against England during the 2015 Cricket World Cup, and scored his maiden ODI century against India in 2016 at the SCG. He was, however, dropped from the Australian Test team after the first Test of the 2016–17 series against South Africa, coming back into the team during the 2017 series against India and playing in two Tests before he suffered an injury. Later in the year, he replaced Peter Handscomb in the third match of 2017–18 Ashes series, scoring his maiden Test century. His first innings score of 181 was one short of his brother Shaun's career best score of 182.

In March 2018, Marsh was fined 20 percent of his match fee and given one demerit point for using offensive language during the second Test between Australia and South Africa, after being dismissed by Kagiso Rabada. The following month, he was awarded a national contract by Cricket Australia for the 2018–19 season and was named as cover for Marcus Stoinis ahead of Australia's 2019 Cricket World Cup match against Pakistan in June 2019. The following month he was named in Australia's squad for the 2019 Ashes series in England, but was not selected for the first four Tests of the series. In the fifth and final match of the series, Marsh took his first five-wicket haul in Test cricket, taking 5/46 in the first innings, but ended on the losing team.

In October 2019, Marsh broke his bowling hand after punching a wall, following his dismissal, during a Sheffield Shield match against Tasmania. As a result, he was forced to miss the start of Australia's Test summer. In April 2020 he was again awarded a central contract ahead of the 2020–21 season and in July 2020 was named in a 26-man preliminary squad of players to begin training ahead of a possible tour to England following the COVID-19 pandemic. In August, Cricket Australia confirmed that the fixtures would be taking place, with Marsh included in the touring party.

=== 2021-onwards ===
==== T20I and ODI tour of West Indies and Bangladesh 2021 ====
In July 2021, with regular top-order bats David Warner and Steve Smith unavailable, Marsh was promoted to No.3 for the first time in T20Is, in the first Twenty20 International match of Australia's tour of the West Indies, Marsh scored his maiden T20I half-century, scoring 51 runs from 31 deliveries. He continued his good form, scoring another half-century in the following match and in the fourth T20I made 75 runs and took his career best T20I bowling figures of 3/24. Marsh was promoted to No.3 for the ODI matches, but less successful, only managing returns of 20 and 8 in the first two matches before he was demoted to no.4 in the 3rd game, scoring 29. A 5-match T20I series against Bangladesh followed, with Marsh batting No.3 again, he scored 45, 44, and scored and his fourth T20I half-century in the 3rd match with 51 runs. Batting No.4 in the fourth match, Marsh only scored 11 before being bowled. He was pushed back to 3 in the fifth game but scored 4, out lbw.

==== T20 World Cup in the UAE 2021 ====
In August 2021, Marsh was named in Australia's squad for the 2021 ICC Men's T20 World Cup.

In October 2021, despite the return of Smith, Marsh retained the No.3 position for the first match of the World Cup against South Africa. Marsh only scored 11 before being caught. In the following match against Sri Lanka, Marsh was demoted down the order, not batting in a 7-wicket win for Australia. Marsh was dropped for Australia's third game, against England, replaced by Smith who only managed 1 run as England cruised to an 8-wicket run over Australia. Marsh's dropping drew criticism from Shane Warne, who said he would have Marsh at No.3 over Smith in T20Is. Marsh was recalled for the next match against Bangladesh, he scored 16 not out in an 8-wicket win for Australia. In the next game against the West Indies, Marsh scored another half-century with 53 runs. In the semi-final against Pakistan, Marsh scored 28 runs before he was out caught.

In November 2021, Marsh batting No.3 scored his sixth T20I half-century for the year, helping Australia win the 2021 ICC Men's T20 World Cup, scoring 77 runs in the final and earning player of the match.

==== Ashes in Australia 2021–22 ====
In December 2021, Marsh was included in Australia's Test squad as back-up for the Fourth 2021–2022 Ashes Test after Travis Head withdrew due to COVID-19. Marsh didn't play.

==== Tour of Pakistan 2022 ====
In February 2022, Marsh was named in Australia's Test, ODI and T20Is squads for a tour of Pakistan. Marsh remained outside of the Test team but injured his hip at training so was unavailable for the 3 ODIs and 1 T20I.

==== Tour of Sri Lanka 2022 ====
In April 2022, Marsh was named to return from injury, included in Australia's Test, ODI and T20Is squads for a tour of Sri Lanka.

In June 2022, Marsh injured his calf in the 2nd T20I against Sri Lanka, ruling him out of the 3rd T20I and the first 2 ODIs. Marsh returned for the 3rd ODI match, batting No.3 in place of an injured Smith but only managed scores of 10, 26 and 24 in a 3–2 series loss. Marsh again didn't play any Tests.

==== Zimbabwe in Australia 2022 ====
In August 2022, Steve Smith returned to the ODI team from injury moving Marsh back to No.6 for the 1st ODI against Zimbabwe in which Marsh only managed a score of 2 from 3 deliveries. Marsh then suffered an ankle injury after the 1st ODI against Zimbabwe forcing him out for the rest of the series and the following ODI series against New Zealand.

==== West Indies and England in Australia 2022 ====
In September 2022, Marsh was named to return from injury for both the 2022 T20 World Cup and T20I tour of India. Marsh was later withdrawn from the Indian series as precaution. Marsh was named for the West Indies T20I series.

In October 2022, Marsh returned from injury in the 1st T20I against the West Indies but only scored 3 runs, out caught. Marsh didn't feature in the 2nd or 3rd T20I. Marsh was named for the England T20I series in which he played all 3 games with scores of 36, 45 and 0.

==== T20 World Cup in Australia 2022 ====
Marsh opened the batting scoring 35 runs against India in the 2022 T20 World Cup warm-up match against India. Marsh had a disappointing World Cup with only 106 runs in 4 matches with scores of 16, 17, 28 and 45. Marsh also only bowled one over during the World Cup due to the ankle injury he suffered in August. Australia failed to defend their T20 World Cup crown on home soil.

In December 2023, Marsh underwent ankle surgery, again ruling him out of another home summer and potential Test recall.

==== Tour of India 2023 ====
In March 2023, Marsh returning from injury, was promoted to open the batting in ODIs for the first time, in a 3-match series against India. Marsh scored 81, 66 not out and 47, earning player of the series award.

==== Ashes in England 2023 ====
In April 2023, Marsh was selected for the 2023 Ashes Tour of England.

In July 2023, Marsh made his long-awaited Test return in the 3rd Ashes Test against England at Headingley to replace injured all-rounder Cameron Green. Coming to the crease at 4 for 85 shortly before lunch on day one, he scored his third Test century, a quickfire 118 from 118 balls, featuring powerful stroke-play with 17 fours and 4 sixes and including 113 runs in the second session. It was his first Test match appearance since 2019 and first century outside Australia, the others coming at home against England in the 2017–18 Ashes series. Mark Taylor described it as Marsh's best century, given he arrived at the crease with Australia 4/85 and England looking to close out the match. Mel Jones, commentating the innings, noted Marsh's unwavering temperament and assertiveness at the crease despite his lack of playing time in the preceding months.

==== T20I and ODI tour of South Africa 2023 ====
In August 2023, Marsh was named as captain of both the T20I and ODI team for a T20I and ODI tour of South Africa. In his first match as Australia T20I captain, Marsh scored a career high of 92 not out, followed it up with 77 not out in the second match. Marsh only scored 15 runs in the third match. Australia winning the series 3-nil. Marsh was awarded player of the series . Marsh struggled for form in the ODI series with scores of 17, 0, 29 and 6 batting no.3 in the first four ODIs. In the final ODI with the series 2-all, Marsh opened the batting scoring 71 in place of an injured Travis Head. Australia lost the series after winning the first two games of the series under Marsh's captaincy.

==== ODI tour of India 2023 ====
In September 2023, Marsh scored 4 runs in the 1st ODI and 96 runs in the 3rd ODI against India in ODIs while opening the batting.

==== ODI World Cup in India 2023 ====
In October 2023, Marsh was named as Australia's ODI vice-captain for the 2023 World Cup. Marsh was out for 0 in the opening match of the World Cup against India. He scored 7 against South Africa and a half century against Sri Lanka with 52 runs. Against Pakistan he scored his 1st ODI century since 2016 with 121 runs. Marsh only managed to score 9 runs against Netherlands. Following the return of Travis Head, Australia shifted Marsh to No.3 and Smith to No.4 against New Zealand with Marsh scoring 36 runs. He returned home for a brief period for a family emergency, missing the match against England before returning against Afghanistan, scoring 24. Against Bangladesh he scored his second 100 for the tournament and his highest score in ODIs with 177 not out. Marsh was out for 0 in the semi-final against South Africa and out for 15 against India in the Final. Australia won led by a Travis Head century.

==== Pakistan and West Indies in Australia 2023–24 ====
In December 2023, Marsh scored 90, 63 not out, 41, 96 and 54 in the 3 Tests against Pakistan, in his first home test series since 2018.

In January 2024, Marsh only managed scores of 5, 21 and 10 in the 2 Test series against the West Indies. Marsh was named for the T20I series but rested for the ODI series against West Indies.

In February 2024, Marsh continued as T20I captain but only managed scores of 16, 29 and 17 in the 2024 home series against the West Indies 2–1 victory.

==== Tour of New Zealand 2024 ====
Marsh returned to form with 72 not out in the 1st T20I against New Zealand, 26 in the 2nd before being rested for the 3rd T20I. Australia won the series 3–0 and Marsh was named played of the series. Marsh scored 40 in the 1st innings of the 1st test before he scored 0 in the 2nd innings and 0 in the 1st innings of the 2nd test before scoring 80 to end the series.

==== T20 World Cup in the West Indies and USA 2024 ====
In May 2024, Marsh was named as Australia's captain for the 2024 ICC Men's T20 World Cup tournament Australia failed to make the T20 World Cup finals for the second straight T20 World Cup and the first under Marsh as captain. Marsh again failed to fire only managing a top score of 37 for the tournament.

==== T20I and ODI tour of Scotland and England ====
In September 2024, Marsh captained Australia to a 3-nil T20I series victory against Scotland. He scored 2 in the 1st T20I before missing the last 2 games due to illness against England in a drawn series. He returned to the ODI team as captain in the absence of Pat Cummins. Marsh scored 10, 60, 24 and 28 in the first four ODIs before being injured bowling in the 4th ODI. Australia won the series 3–2.

==== India in Australia 2024–25 ====
In November 2024, Marsh scored 6 and 47 runs and took 3 wickets in the 1st 2024-25 Border-Gavaskar Trophy Test at Perth, but then failed to score more than 9 runs in the next three Tests along with failing to take a wicket. Marsh was subsequently dropped for the 5th Test for 31-year old debutant Beau Webster.

==== Champions Trophy in Pakistan and United Arab Emirates 2025 ====
In January 2025, Marsh was dropped from the Test team for the tour of Sri Lanka. Marsh was unavailable due to injury for the 2025 ICC Champions Trophy.

==== Tour of Pakistan 2026 ====
Australia's captain Mitchell Marsh acknowledged the team's poor performance in the 3–0 series loss to Pakistan in Lahore, where they were outplayed in both batting and bowling. Missing key players like Tim David, Josh Hazlewood, Nathan Ellis, and Glenn Maxwell, who were given time to recover for the World Cup, Australia fielded a weakened team. Travis Head, Xavier Bartlett, Josh Inglis, Marcus Stoinis, and Ben Dwarshuis featured in limited matches, with some playing only one or two. Despite these challenges, Australia faces fitness and form concerns ahead of their opening World Cup match against Ireland on February 11 in Colombo.

== Achievements ==
- ICC Men's T20I Team of the Year: 2021.
- ICC Men's ODI Team of the Year: 2016
- Australian T20I Player of the Year: 2022
- Allan Border Medal: 2023

== Career best performances ==
	Batting			
	Score	Fixture	Venue	Season
Test	181	Australia v England	WACA Ground, Perth	2017
ODI	177*	Australia v Bangladesh	Maharashtra Cricket Association Stadium, Maharashtra	2023
T20I	103*	Australia v New Zealand	Bay Oval, Mount Maunganui	2025
FC	211	Australia A v India A	Allan Border Field, Brisbane	2014
LA	177*	Australia v Bangladesh	Maharashtra Cricket Association Stadium, Maharashtra	2023
T20	100*	Perth Scorchers v Hobart Hurricanes	Blundstone Arena, Hobart	2021

	Bowling (innings)			
	Figures	Fixture	Venue	Season
Test	5/46	Australia v England cricket team	The Oval, London	2019
ODI	5/33	Australia v England	MCG, Melbourne	2015
T20I	3/24	Australia v West Indies	Daren Sammy National Cricket Stadium, Gros Islet	2021
FC	6/84	Western Australia v Queensland	WACA Ground, Perth	2011
LA	5/33	Australia v England	MCG, Melbourne	2015
T20	4/6	Western Australia v New South Wales	WACA Ground, Perth	2010
