= Anna Senjuschenko =

Australian soccer player

Personal information
- Full name: Anna Senjuschenko
- Date of birth: 16 September 1961
- Place of birth: Perth, Western Australia
- Date of death: 19 August 1979 (aged 17)
- Place of death: Perth, Western Australia
- Position: Centre back

International career^{‡}
Years	Team	Apps	(Gls)
1978	Australia	4	(0)
- ‡ National team caps and goals as of 03:02, 23 May 2019 (UTC)

Anna Senjuschenko (Russian: Анна Сенющенко; 16 September 1961 – 19 August 1979) was an Australian soccer player who won four unofficial caps for the Australia women's national soccer team.

Senjuschenko was an elegant central defender, noted for her powerful shooting. At the 1978 Women's World Invitational Tournament, she was named Australia's best player and named to the team of the tournament. The following year she was involved in a fatal traffic accident, while travelling as a passenger in a car in central Perth. In 1996 Senjuschenko was named to the Football Hall of Fame Western Australia.

Anna's brother Alex Senjuschenko was also a soccer centre-half and Football Hall of Fame Western Australia member. Their parents were Russian and moved to Australia in the early 1950s. Alex died in April 2012.
