= Ray Ilott =

Australian soccer player (1948–2016)

Personal information
- Full name: Raymond Ilott
- Date of birth: 11 January 1948
- Place of birth: London, England
- Date of death: 27 November 2016 (aged 68)
- Position: Forward

Senior career*
Years	Team	Apps	(Gls)
	Leyton Orient	0	(0)
- Walthamstow Avenue
1968–1970	Cheshunt	40	(?)
1970–1976	SMA Cottesloe/Ascot		
1977	Rockingham United		
1978	Floreat Athena		
1979–1982	Forrestfield United		
1983–1985	Balga		
1986	Wanneroo City		

International career
1975	Australia	4	(0)

Managerial career
- Forrestfield
- Balga
- Wanneroo
- Hamersley
- Stirling Macedonia
- Kingsway Olympic
- Kingsley
- * Club domestic league appearances and goals

Ray Ilott (11 January 1948 – 27 November 2016), was an Australian association footballer.

== Playing career ==
=== Club career ===
Ilott was briefly on the books of Football League Division Two team Leyton Orient before playing for a number of English non-league teams. Between 1968 and 1970 he played 40 times for Cheshunt before announcing he was emigrating to Australia.

After arriving in Australia in 1970, Ilott played for Ascot in the Western Australia State League.

=== State career ===
Ilott played 32 times for Western Australia.

=== International career ===
Ilott played four full international matches for Australia in 1975, all against the USSR.

== Honours ==
=== Player ===
- Rothmans Gold Medal - Best and Fairest in State League: 1974
- Football Hall of Fame Western Australia Hall of Champions Inductee: 1996

Ascot

- Western Australia State League League Champion: 1974
- Western Australia State League Night Series Champion: 1974

Forrestfield United

- Western Australia State League Top Four Champion: 1981

=== Manager ===
Forrestfield United

- Western Australia State League Top Four Champion: 1981

Stirling Macedonia

- Western Australia State League League Champion: 1987
- Western Australia State League Night Series Champion: 1988
