= Gdańsk Sports Center Stadium =

Multi-purpose stadium in Gdańsk, Poland

Coordinates: 54°22′4.59″N 18°37′15.79″E

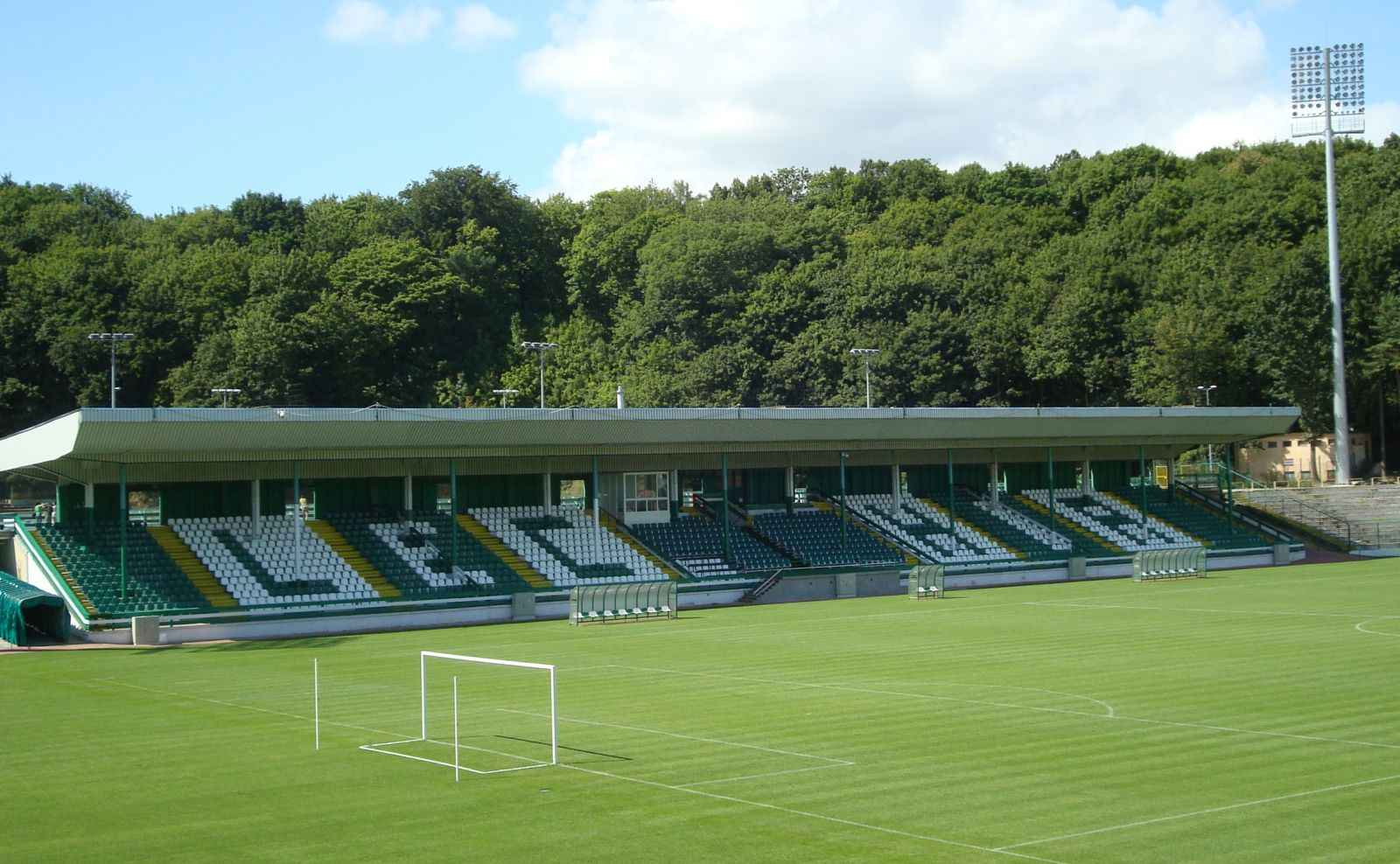
- Interactive map of Gdańsk Sports Center Stadium
- Full name: Stadion Gdańskiego Ośrodka Sportu
- Former names: Stadion MOSiR
- Location: Gdańsk, Poland
- Owner: Gdańsk Sports Center
- Capacity: 12,244
- Surface: Grass
- Field size: 110 x 69 m (120 x 75 yd)

Construction
- Built: 1927
- Renovated: 1935, 1983, 2008

Tenants
- Lechia Gdańsk (1945–2011); RC Lechia Gdańsk (1956–2012); Lechia Gdańsk II (2005–2019); Lechia Gdańsk Ladies (2019–present)

The Stadion Gdańskiego Ośrodka Sportu (Gdańsk Sports Center Stadium), sometimes officially called the Lechia Gdańsk Stadion or simply the Lechia Stadion is a multi-purpose stadium in Gdańsk, Poland. The stadium has a capacity of about 12,000 people, however it held 40,000 spectators during a match between Lechia Gdańsk and Italian side Juventus. The stadium was formerly called the "Stadium of the City Centre of Sports and Relaxation" (Polish: Stadion Miejskiego Ośrodka Sportu i Rekreacji), and was known as Stadion MOSiR for short, until the Gdańsk Sports Center took over the stadium management in 2000.

The ground was once the major centre of all sporting activities for the Lechia Gdańsk sports club. The ground was in the centre of a complex which included tennis courts, and an additional football pitch. After the stadium was rebuilt after being damaged during the Second World War, Lechia stopped playing football matches on fields in Gdańsk and made the stadium their home. The stadium hosted all games for the football and rugby teams for over 60 years before the facilities had become too outdated.

The Lechia Gdańsk men's football team played all of their home matches at the stadium from 1945 until 2011 when they moved to Stadion Energa Gdańsk which had been built for Euro 2012. RC Lechia Gdańsk started playing at the stadium from 1956, currently mainly playing at the specialised rugby pitch at the Gdańsk Athletics and Rugby Stadium, however the rugby team still plays games at the stadium, especially games against their main rivals RC Arka Gdynia. The stadium also formerly held games for Lechia Lechia Gdańsk II who had used the stadium for home games sporadically from 1963 until 2005, when the second team was fully integrated into the Lechia set-up and used the stadium for all their home games until 2019.

Currently, the stadium is mostly used only for footballing purposes. It is the home stadium for the Lechia Gdańsk Ladies team, and is used for training purposes by the men's senior team. Occasionally, Lechia Gdańsk Rugby also use the stadium when they have major games where a large crowd is expected.

== Facilities ==
During the 2007–08 winter break some of the stadiums and training grounds facilities were updated, including heated turf, more modern floodlights (emitting 2,000 lux), a semi-artificial pitch surface, two new training pitches, tennis courts, an updated gymnasium and athletic hall, and a hotel and office building.

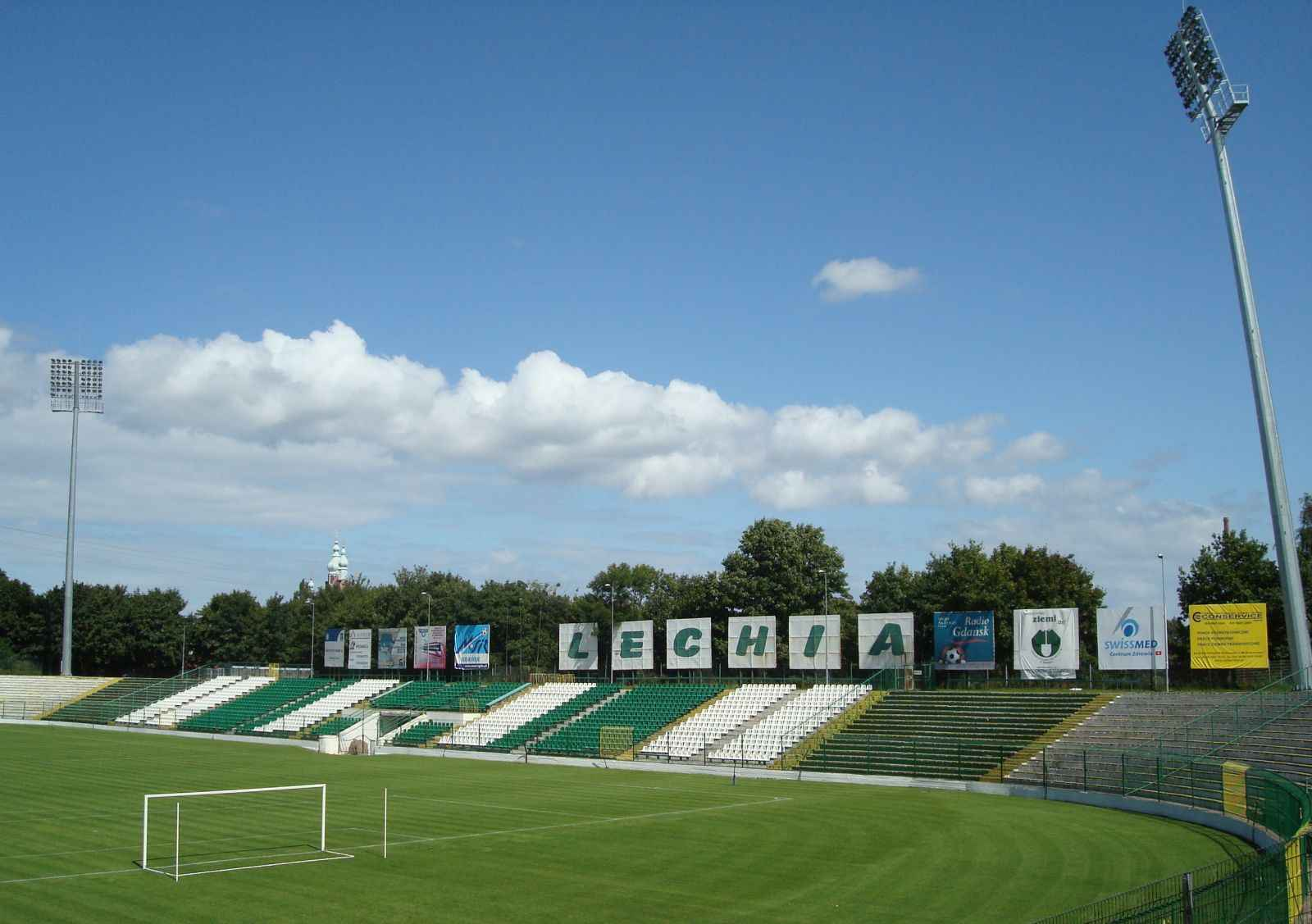

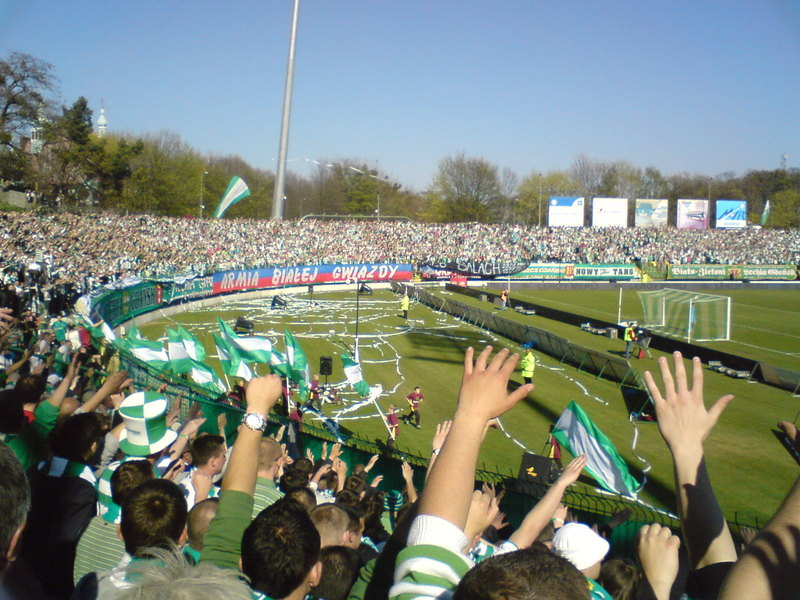

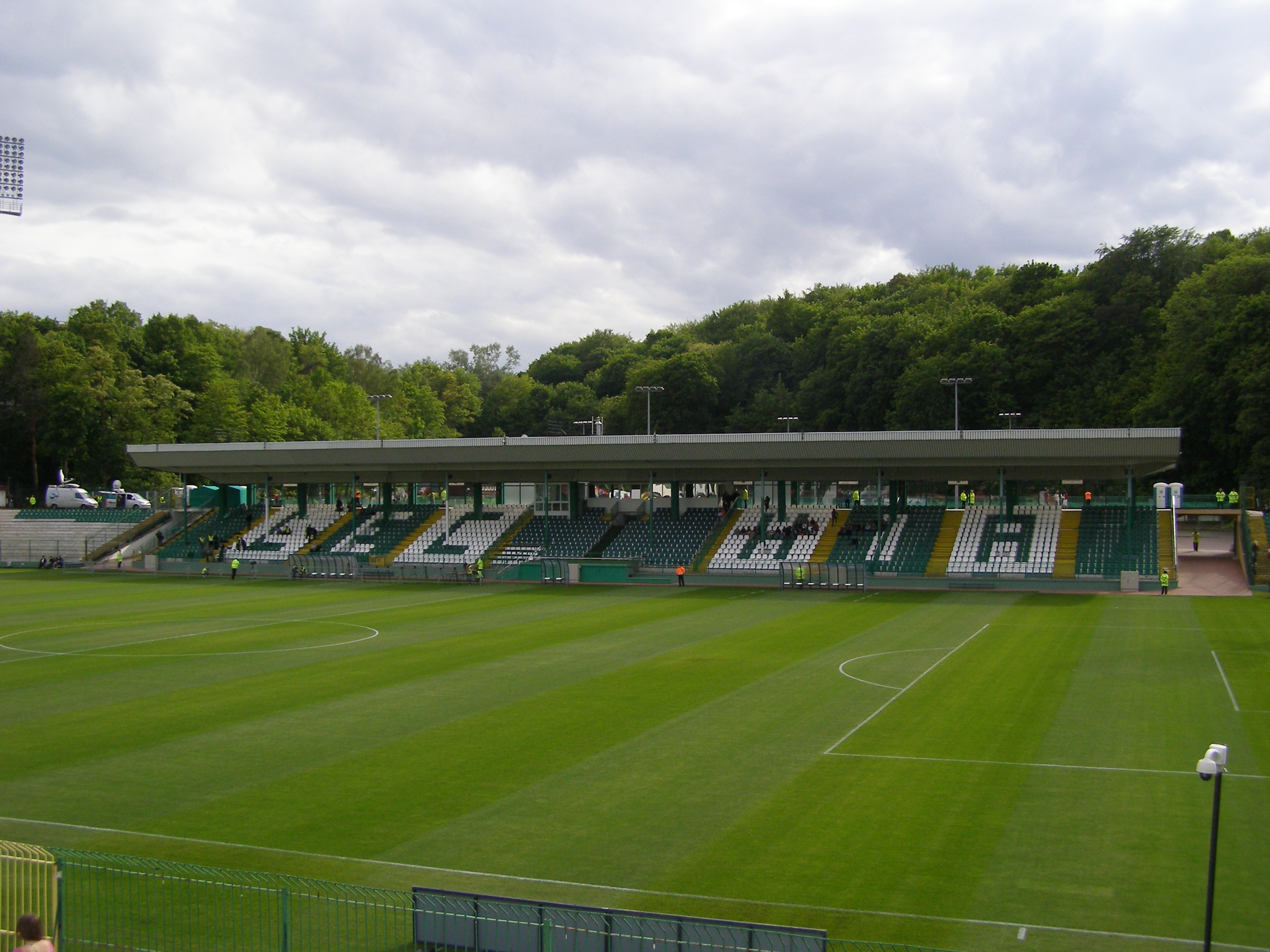

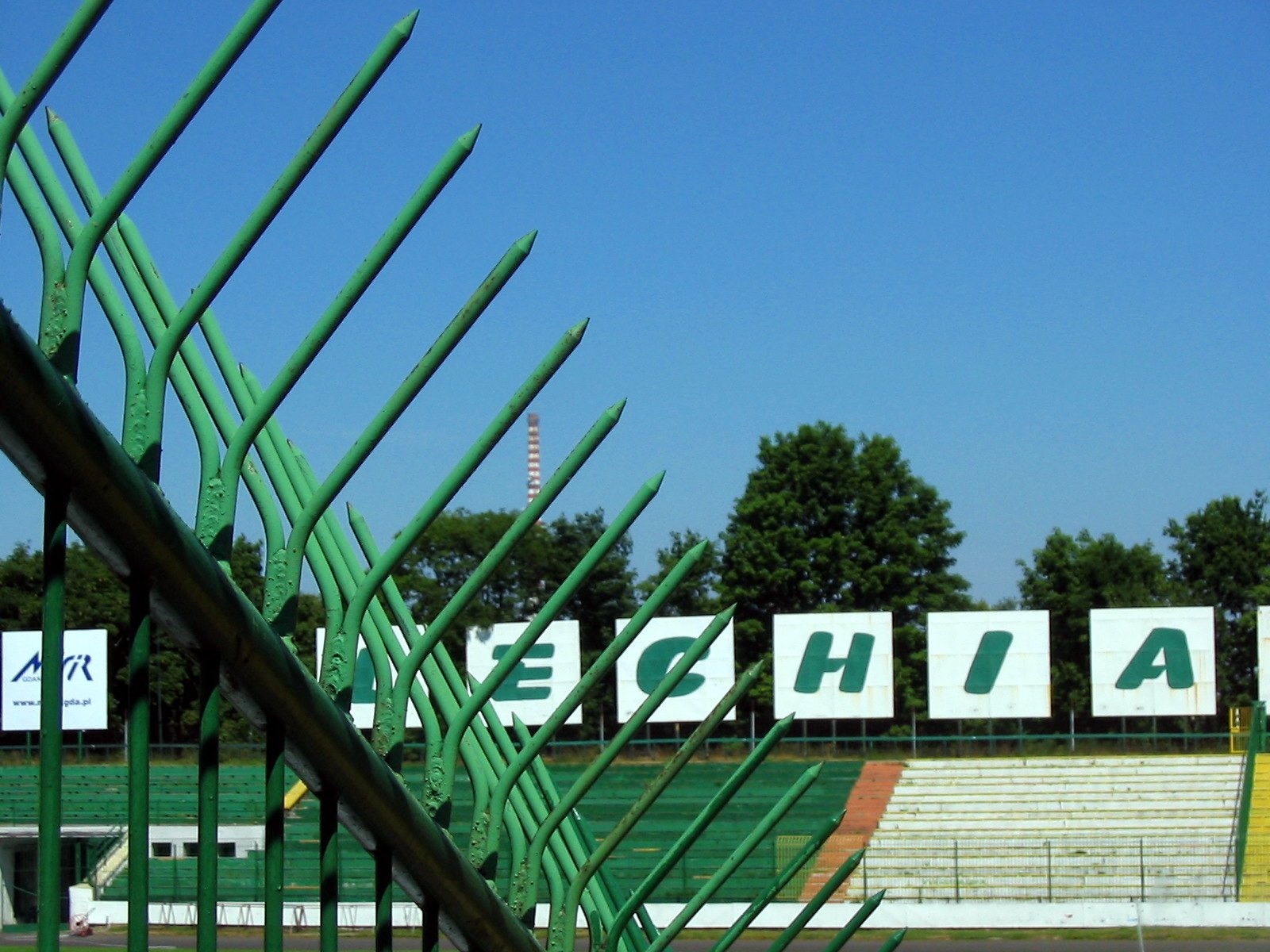

== Internationals ==
=== Poland national football team ===
The Poland national football team only played once at the stadium, when Poland played Cyprus in the qualification rounds for the 1988 European Championships.

Nr	Competition	Date	Opponent	Result
1	Euro 1988 qualifying	12 April 1987	Cyprus	0–0

The Polish women's national football team also played at this stadium, only in 2025. It was a friendly match against Latvia.

Nr	Competition	Date	Opponent	Result
1	Friendly match	2 December 2025	Latvia	3–0

=== Euro 2012 ===
During the Euro 2012 finals the Germany national team chose Gdańsk as their base and the Gdańsk Sports Center Stadium as their training ground.

== Avenue of Stars ==
At the MOSiR Stadium Lechia have an "Avenue of Stars" which commemorates the efforts and success of former players and coaches from the senior football team. There are currently 21 players with stars at the stadium, including all-time top goal scorer, Roman Rogocz, and all-time appearance maker, Zdzisław Puszkarz. Due to MOSiR becoming the training ground in 2011 after the move to the PGE Arena Gdańsk there have been calls for the stars to be moved to the new stadium by some fans, while others see the stadium as the historic home of Lechia Gdańsk and the perfect place to keep the players commemorative stars.

Those people who have received stars are;

Name	Lechia apps.	Lechia goals	Notes
Jerzy Apolewicz	260	57	Only played for Lechia during his career.
Michał Globisz	-	-	Lechia's first team manager from 1981 to 1982, 1984 & 1986, Lechia's assistant manager from 1985 to 1986, and Lechia's youth team manager from 1974 to 1981.
Józef Gładysz	231	9	Only played for Lechia during his career, managed the team from 1996 to 1997.
Andrzej Głownia	217	28	-
Henryk Gronowski	276	0	Played once for Poland.
Robert Gronowski	186	59	Played once for Poland. Managed the team in 1966.
Jerzy Jastrzębowski	89	24	Only played professionally for Lechia. Was Lechia's manager during the Polish Cup and Polish SuperCup wins in 1983.
Bogusław Kaczmarek	57	7	Managed Lechia twice from 1989 to 1992 and 2012–2013.
Alfred Kokot	128	51	Lechia's first ever international player and international goalscorer.
Henryk Kokot	86	20	-
Roman Korynt	340	9	Lechia's joint highest appearance maker. Most international appearances for a Lechia player with 32.
Jerzy Kruszczyński	71	45	Won the Polish SuperCup in 1983. Highest goalscorer in a season for Lechia with 31 in 1983–1984.
Lech Kulwicki	213	6	Won the Polish Cup and Polish SuperCup in 1983.
Hubert Kusz	182	2	Spent over 10 years at Lechia.
Władysław Musiał	213	31	Spent over 10 years at Lechia.
Ryszard Polak	143	22	Won the Polish Cup and Polish SuperCup in 1983.
Zdzisław Puszkarz	340	61	Lechia's joint highest appearance maker. Played once for Poland.
Andrzej Salach	337	20	Only played for Lechia during his career. Won the Polish Cup and Polish SuperCup in 1983.
Jakub Smug	17	0	-
Roman Rogocz	168	108	Lechia's highest ever goalscorer. Received the Order of Polonia Restituta in 2011.
Zbigniew Żemojtel	213	1	Spent over 10 years at Lechia.

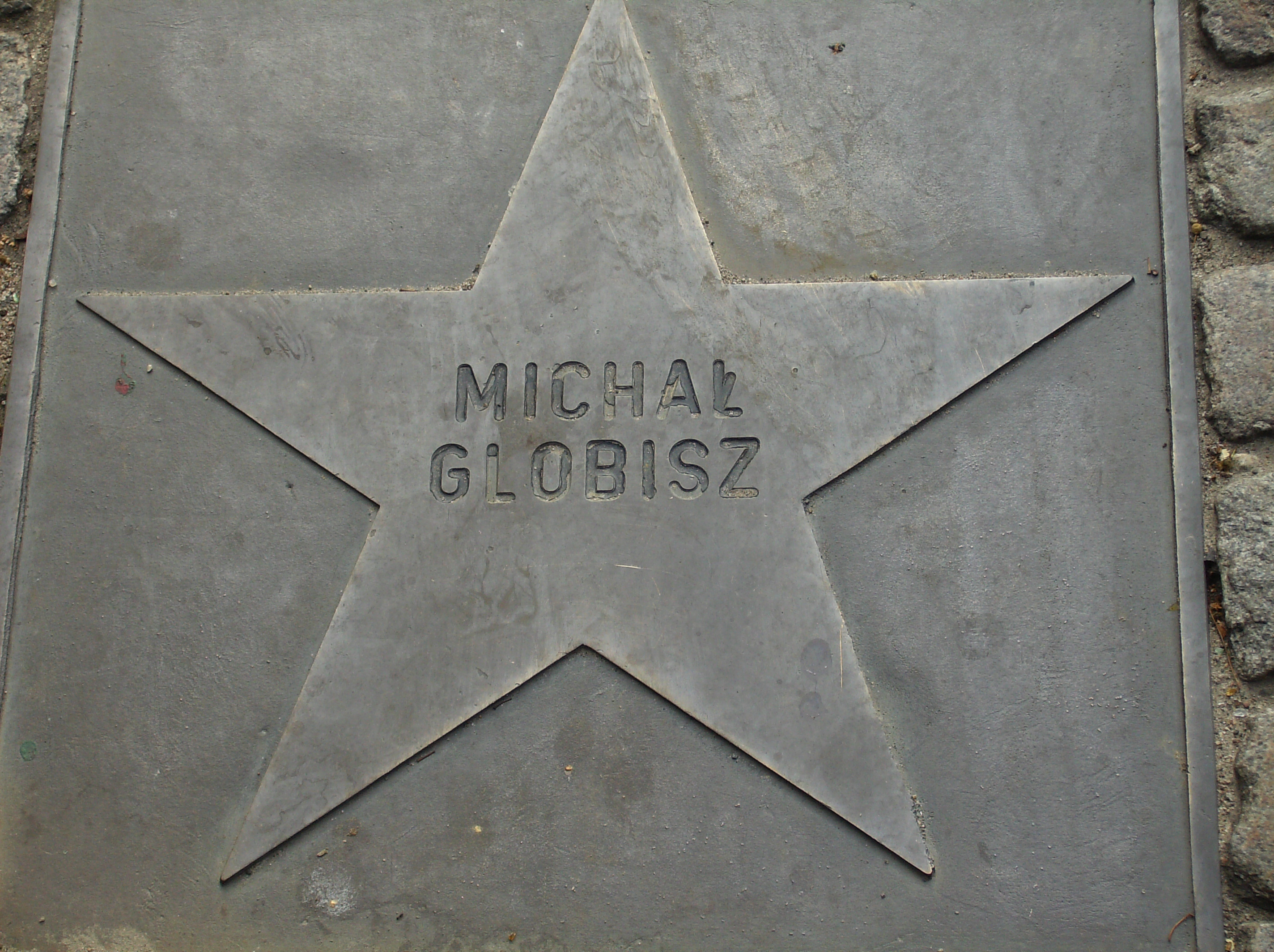

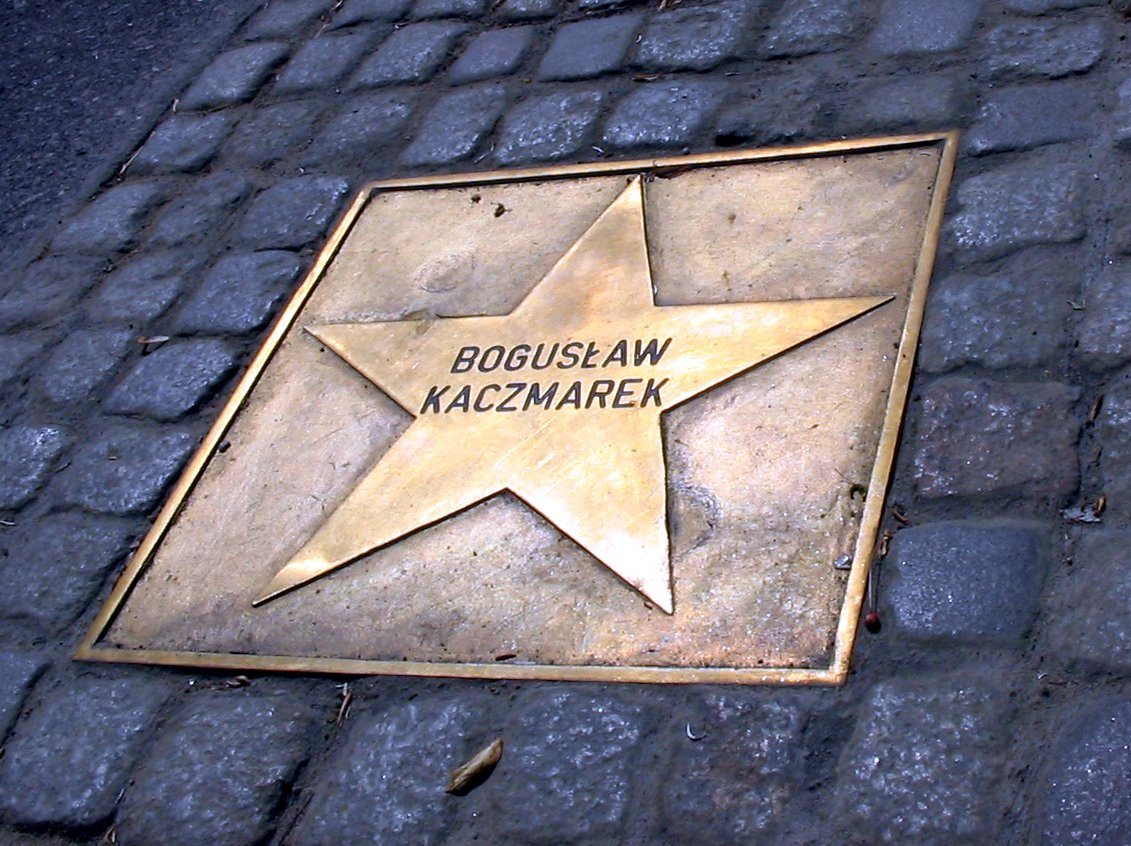

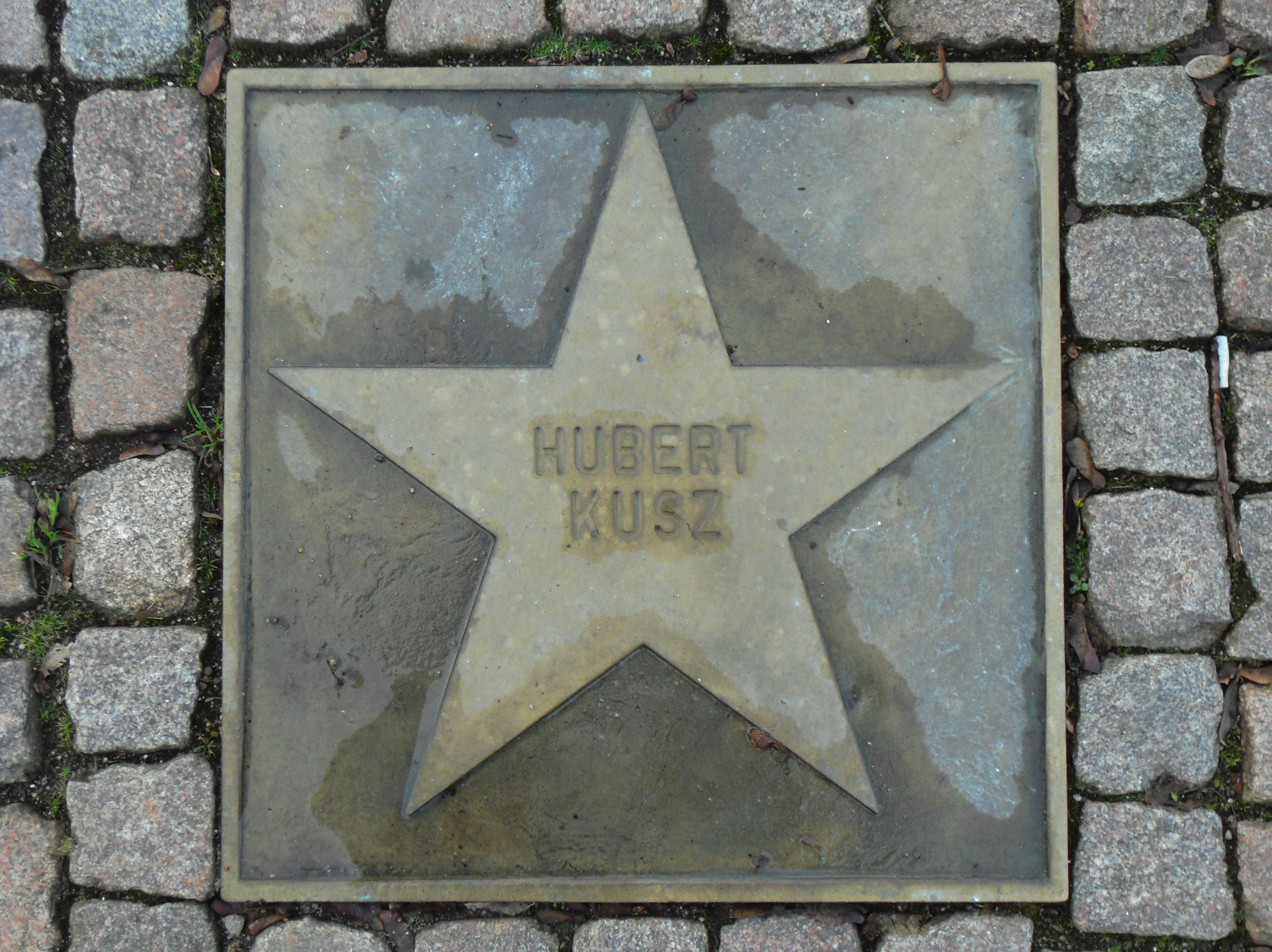

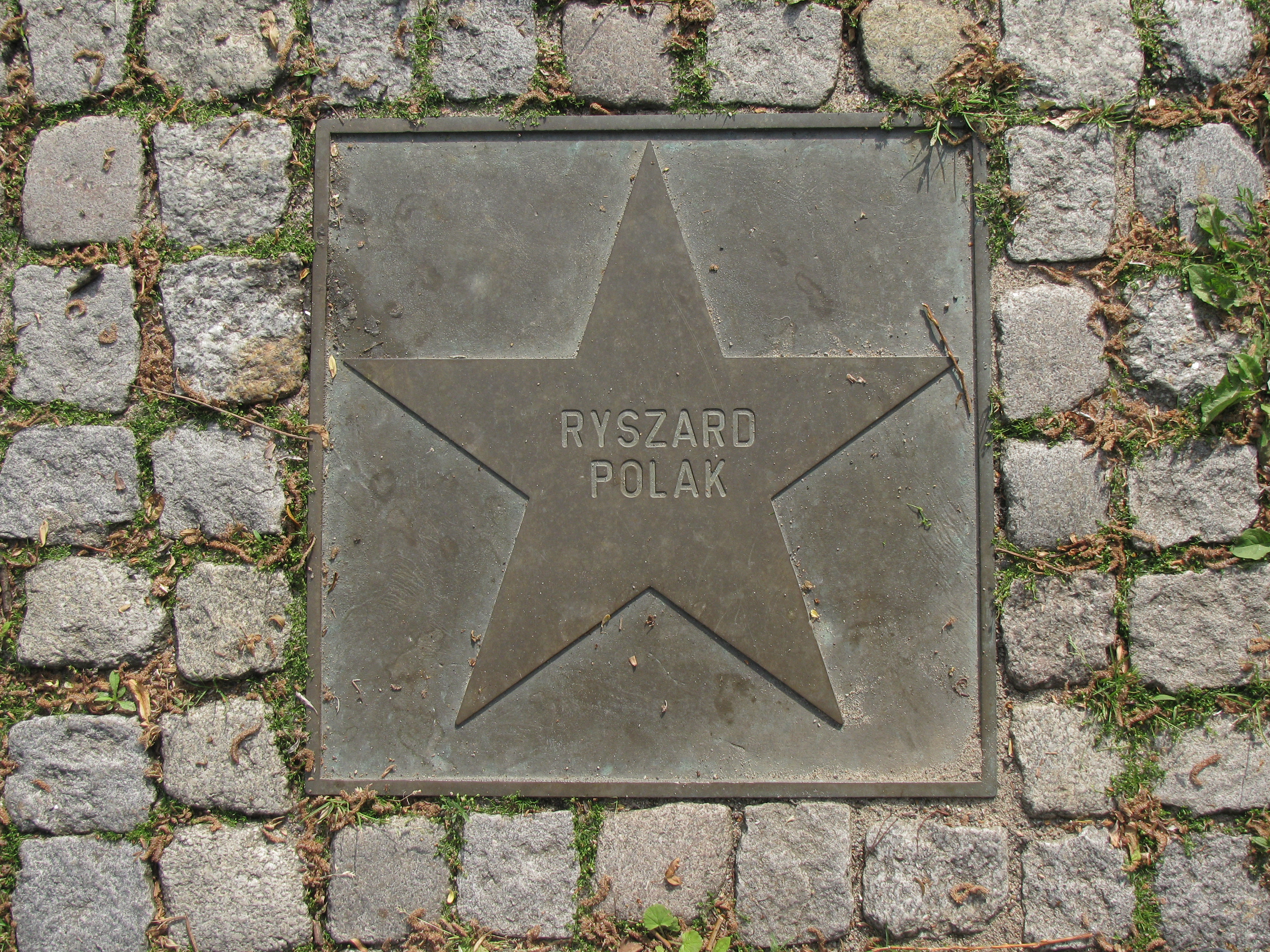

== Concerts ==
David Bowie was scheduled to perform at the stadium during his Earthling Tour on July 27, 1997, but the show was cancelled.
