= Cracovia Club =

Community organisation in Australia

Cracovia Club is a Polish Australian community organisation based in Bennett Springs, Western Australia.

== History ==
The club was formed in 1950 at St Brigid's Parish Hall in Northbridge by members of the Perth Polish Australian community. The club was named Polish Sport Club Cracovia after the city of Kraków in Poland. It is a name shared by Polish football team Cracovia. The club was initially based in Perth before moving to premises in Barlee Street, Highgate in 1972. The club was based in Highgate until 1990 when it moved to its current location in Bennett Springs (then Beechboro).

== Soccer ==
Soccer played an important early part in the club's history. Much of the club's efforts were put into ensuring success. However through the years the sporting side of the club has become less prominent with more of a focus on community activities.

=== Current ===
The club now has a team playing in the Football West Social Division 1.

== Other sports ==
A number of sports have been played competitively by the Cracovia Club including netball, tennis and table tennis.
