= List of Perth Scorchers (WBBL) cricketers =

List of cricketers

The Perth Scorchers are an Australian cricket club who play in the Women's Big Bash League, the national women's domestic Twenty20 competition. The club was established in 2015 as an inaugural member of the eight-club league. This list includes players who have played at least one match for the Scorchers in the Women's Big Bash League.

== List of players ==
Correct as of 12 February 2023.

Players are listed according to the date of their debut for the Scorchers. All statistics are for Women's Big Bash League only.

- The number to the left of player name represents 'cap'. For players who debuted for club in the same match, player caps are ordered by alphabetical order of last name.
- In category "Debut" games are listed as Tournament/Round. e.g. BBL03/8 would equate to 2017–18 Women's Big Bash League, Perth Scorchers' 8th Match of the tournament.
- Hover over column headings for key

Perth Scorchers Players							Batting				Fielding		Bowling				
	Player	Nat	Seasons	Debut	Championships	Mat	Runs	HS	Ave	SR	Ct	St	Wkts	BBI	Ave	Econ	SR
1	Suzie Bates	(New Zealand)	2015–2017	WBBL01/1		25	530	54*	27.89	97.24	8	–	21	3/25	25.9	6.28	24.7
2	Emma Biss	(Australia)	2015–2016	WBBL01/1		14	40	18	13.33	97.56	2	–	5	2/14	26.4	6.71	23.6
3	Nicole Bolton	(Australia)	2015–2020	WBBL01/1		86	1494	71	22.29	95.28	22	–	41	3/20	27.92	6.8	24.6
4	Katherine Sciver-Brunt	(England)	2015–2018	WBBL01/1		44	447	41	17.88	103.47	13	–	49	4/17	17.71	5.15	20.6
5	Charlotte Edwards	(England)	2015–2016	WBBL01/1		15	462	88*	42	103.58	0	–	–	–	–	–	–
6	Heather Graham	(Australia)	2015–2021	WBBL01/1	WBBL07	100	1026	44*	16.81	98.18	35	–	102	3/16	21.11	6.86	18.4
7	Katie-Jane Hartshorn	(Australia)	2015–2017	WBBL01/1		21	5	4*	–	62.5	2	–	16	4/23	23.93	6.27	22.8
8	Chloe Piparo	(Australia)	2015–2024	WBBL01/1	WBBL07	121	919	50*	13.71	97.04	36	–	–	–	–	–	–
9	Nicky Shaw	(England)	2015–2016	WBBL01/1		15	2	2	0.5	22.22	4	–	16	3/28	20	5.61	21.3
10	Elyse Villani	(Australia)	2015–2019	WBBL01/1		58	1706	84*	34.12	114.88	34	1	3	3/16	15	8.18	11
11	Jenny Wallace	(Australia)	2015–2016	WBBL01/1		11	53	29	8.83	86.88	5	3	–	–	–	–	–
12	Emma King	(Australia)	2015–2019	WBBL01/2		54	28	6*	9.33	84.84	7	–	41	3/17	26.36	6.42	24.6
13	Megan Banting	(Australia)	2015–2020	WBBL01/5		27	82	18	5.85	82	2	1	–	–	–	–	–
14	Deandra Dottin	(Barbados)	2015–2016	WBBL01/7		6	75	28	15	117.18	2	–	5	2/17	26.2	6.89	22.8
15	Piepa Cleary	(Australia)	2015–2023	WBBL01/9	WBBL07	81	145	18*	13.06	91.19	22	–	56	3/16	26.42	7.18	22.0
16	Lauren Ebsary	(Australia)	2016–2019	WBBL02/1		46	549	61*	27.45	106.8	14	–	–	–	–	–	–
17	Rebecca Grundy	(England)	2016	WBBL02/1		4	–	–	–	–	2	–	5	2/18	18	6.42	16.8
18	Anya Shrubsole	(England)	2016–2017	WBBL02/5		12	12	9*	4	109.09	3	–	9	2/9	27	5.26	30.7
19	Mathilda Carmichael	(Australia)	2017–2022	WBBL03/1	WBBL07	45	259	35	13.63	98.85	9	–	–	–	–	–	–
20	Thamsyn Newton	(New Zealand)	2017–2018	WBBL03/1		14	50	16	12.5	96.15	4	–	6	2/15	23.33	9.43	14.8
21	Nat Sciver-Brunt	(England)	2017–2019	WBBL03/1		38	890	84	32.96	120.92	24	–	14	2/18	41.14	7.23	34.1
22	Emily Smith	(Australia)	2017–2018	WBBL03/1		27	2	2	0.66	25	3	5	–	–	–	–	–
23	Mikayla Hinkley	(Australia)	2017–2025	WBBL03/4		20	166	32	11.85	93.25	10	–	–	–	–	–	–
24	Taneale Peschel	(Australia)	2017–2023	WBBL03/5	WBBL07	73	63	12*	7.87	103.27	8	–	50	3/13	29.88	7.05	25.4
25	Hayleigh Brennan	(Australia)	2018	WBBL04/1		9	11	7*	11	100	1	–	1	1/19	114	8.14	84
26	Kate Cross	(England)	2018–2019	WBBL04/1		14	70	20	10	109.37	7	–	6	2/26	60	7.29	49.3
27	Meg Lanning	(Australia)	2018–2019	WBBL04/1		24	920	101	43.8	125.68	10	–	–	–	–	–	–
28	Bhavisha Devchand	(Australia)	2018–2019	WBBL04/2		4	17	8*	8.5	77.27	1	–	1	1/15	48	9.6	30
29	Amy Jones	(England)	2018–2024	WBBL04/2		52	1019	80	23.15	119.74	20	5	–	–	–	–	–
30	Hayley Jensen	(New Zealand)	2018–2019	WBBL04/4		6	30	12*	10	96.77	1	–	8	2/16	22.87	7.95	17.2
31	Jemma Barsby	(Australia)	2019–2020	WBBL05/1		27	110	31	12.22	90.9	8	–	5	2/19	58	7.8	44.6
32	Kim Garth	(Republic of Ireland)	2019	WBBL05/1		15	23	8*	11.5	104.54	1	–	14	3/21	24.21	6.78	21.4
33	Georgia Redmayne	(Australia)	2019	WBBL05/1		15	137	51	15.22	95.13	5	1	–	–	–	–	–
34	Samantha Betts	(Australia)	2019–2021	WBBL05/7		18	1	1*	1	33.33	1	–	13	3/21	21.76	7.44	17.5
35	Kath Hempenstall	(Australia)	2019	WBBL05/14		2	–	–	–	–	0	–	–	–	–	–	–
36	Sophie Devine	(New Zealand)	2020–2025	WBBL06/1	WBBL07	77	1084	103	32.84	121.11	34	–	64	4/25	24.01	7.80	18.4
37	Sarah Glenn	(England)	2020	WBBL06/1		14	35	19	5.83	106.06	2	–	17	4/18	18.88	6.25	18.1
38	Beth Mooney	(Australia)	2020–2025	WBBL06/1	WBBL07	80	3024	105	47.25	129.61	37	21	–	–	–	–	–
39	Lauren Down	(New Zealand)	2020	WBBL06/4		7	26	12	8.66	96.29	3	–	–	–	–	–	–
40	Chamari Athapaththu	(Sri Lanka)	2021	WBBL07/1		10	182	70*	30.33	117.41	5	–	0	–	–	10	–
41	Marizanne Kapp	(South Africa)	2021–2022	WBBL07/1	WBBL07	28	335	68*	25.76	125.46	5	–	24	4/10	21.91	5.5	23.8
42	Alana King	(Australia)	2021–2025	WBBL07/1	WBBL07	66	416	33*	18.08	117.18	27	–	84	5/16	18.02	6.64	16.2
43	Lilly Mills	(Australia)	2021–2025	WBBL07/1	WBBL07	60	77	15*	5.13	85.55	13	–	55	4/25	19.09	7.40	15.4
44	Lisa Griffith	(Australia)	2021–2023	WBBL07/4	WBBL07	10	9	7	4.5	90	3	–	3	2/17	30.66	7.07	26
45	Amy Edgar	(Australia)	2021–2025	WBBL07/14		53	262	36*	13.78	95.27	14	–	42	4/19	24.73	7.56	19.6
46	Maddy Green	(New Zealand)	2022	WBBL08/1		14	240	58	24	105.26	10	–	–	–	–	–	–
47	Holly Ferling	(Australia)	2022	WBBL08/5		5	8	8*	–	200	1	–	1	1/25	62	7.75	48
48	Lauren Winfield-Hill	(England)	2023	WBBL09/1		5	93	29	18.60	104.49	1	–	–	–	–	–	–
49	Maddy Darke	(Australia)	2023–2025	WBBL09/1		27	350	45*	15.21	108.02	3	–	–	–	–	–	–
50	Chloe Ainsworth	(Australia)	2023–2025	WBBL09/1		36	149	41	13.54	104.92	14	–	40	3/22	22.30	6.96	19.2
51	Stella Campbell	(Australia)	2023	WBBL09/1		4	–	–	–	–	1	–	2	2/10	32	9.14	21
52	Carly Leeson	(Australia)	2024	WBBL10/1		4	2	1	0.5	16.66	1	–	2	1/16	34.5	6.9	30
53	Ebony Hoskin	(Australia)	2024–2025	WBBL10/1		13	7	2*	3.5	53.84	4	–	8	2/10	34.62	7.95	26.1
54	Dayalan Hemalatha	(India)	2024	WBBL10/2		8	99	41	12.37	110	2	–	–	–	–	–	–
55	Brooke Halliday	(New Zealand)	2024	WBBL10/8		3	109	47	36.33	118.47	1	–	–	–	–	–	–
56	Katie Mack	(Australia)	2025	WBBL11/1		13	297	79	24.75	112.92	8	–	–	–	–	–	–
57	Paige Scholfield	(England)	2025	WBBL11/1		13	161	46*	23	143.75	5	–	–	–	–	–	–
58	Freya Kemp	(England)	2025	WBBL11/1		13	193	35	21.44	147.32	5	–	–	–	–	–	–
59	Ruby Strange	(Australia)	2025	WBBL11/4		10	0	0*	–	0	2	–	4	2/16	44.50	8.47	31.5

Source: ESPN.cricinfo Scorchers Batting records and ESPN.cricinfo Scorchers Bowling & Fielding records

== See also ==
- List of Perth Scorchers cricketers
