= Jack Conduit =

English soccer player (1906–1985)

Personal information
- Full name: John "Jack" Conduit
- Date of birth: 3 November 1906
- Place of birth: Wolverhampton, England
- Date of death: 4 April 1985 (aged 78)
- Position: Forward

Youth career
- 1919–1920: Wolverhampton Wanderers
- 1921–1923: Perth City

Senior career*
Years	Team	Apps	(Gls)
1923–1927	Perth City	7	(11)
1928–1940	Victoria Park	122+	(307)
Total		129+	(318)
- * Club domestic league appearances and goals

John "Jack" Conduit was an Australian soccer player who played as a forward during the 1930s. He was a prominent figure in the infamous Victoria Park, side that dominated Western Australian Football from 1926 to 1940, winning 24 trophies.

== Early life ==
Conduit was born on 23 November 1906 in Wolverhampton, England. He played in Wolverhampton Wanderers' youth side in the late 1910s and flourished as a defender. His form in the youth side managed to get him a call-up to the England Schoolboys side against the Scottish Junior side, but failed to get any further as he departed to Western Australia in 1920.

== Club career ==
=== Perth City ===
Perth City secretary Stan Power invited Conduit to join the club's youngsters after seeing playing football on the Perth Esplanade. His progress was fast and, by the age of 17, he had made the first of his 80 senior appearances for Perth City, where he established a reputation as a fine goalscorer. He proved this in scoring five against Claremont in two games and a hat-trick against Thistle in his final season with Perth.

=== Victoria Park ===
Conduit scored ten goals against his former club, six goals in a 15–2 win over Armadale and four goals in an impressive win over Thistle. "It is unlikely that a better inside-left can be found in the whole Commonwealth," wrote The West Australian on 28 July 1928. "He is clever with the ball and has wonderful hitting power with both feet." At the end of the season, he was named the league's top scorer with an impressive 42 goals in just 14 games. Victoria Park were crowned champions without losing a game after scoring 115 goals while conceding just 16. The icing on the cake was in October when Victoria Park won the Charity Cup beating Subiaco 5–1, with Conduit scoring his team's second goal.

Victoria Park won the First Division Championship in 1929. Conduit was again the top scorer with 35 goals, including a 30-yard drive in the last round loss to Casuals. The season ended with Victoria Park winning the Challenge Cup 4–2 against Caledonians, with Conduit scoring the last goal. In March, he was among six Victoria Park players who led Western Australia to a 5–3 victory over an England Cricket XI. He may not have found the net that day, but he made up for it later in the year with a brace in the state team's 7–1 win over HMAS Canberra. The following season was a little more disappointing, with Victoria Park finishing third in the Championship and failing to qualify for the cup final.

Conduit scored all the goals in a 5–0 win over Caledonians on the opening day of the 1931 regular season, not only putting him top of the goalscoring charts but also securing the Victoria Park title on goal difference against Thistle. He made headlines in October by scoring twice in ten minutes to lead his side to the Charity Cup and two weeks later added a Challenge Cup winners' medal. The following year, he was crowned top scorer for the fourth consecutive time, with 28 goals, including three against the Caledonians and four against Fremantle. But he did better than those two goals by scoring six goals in Western Australia's win over the Japanese Navy. And to end the season, he scored another hat-trick, against Thistle, in the semi-final of the Charity Cup, which Victoria Park won after beating North Perth in the final.

Conduit's talents were not limited to goals and in 1933 he was awarded the Dunkling Medal as the league's best player. "Conduit's stunning technique and unerring judgment marked him out as a player of exceptional skill, while his determination and erratic style of play revealed his value as a match-winning attacker," said "the West Australian" on 3 October 1933. In July, he made headlines by marrying Eileen Kiddle just hours after he "gave the keeper no chance with a 20-yard strike" that ended the Caledonians' unbeaten run. He scored the only goal in October's Challenge Cup final against the Northern Casuals and the following month he repeated this feat when Victoria Park won the Charity Cup against the same opposition.

Victoria Park were then the dominant force in the Championship and in 1934 they won every trophy on offer, were crowned league champions and lifted the Charity Cup and the Challenge Cup. Conduit was instrumental in their success, scoring a hat-trick in a 7–2 win over Thistle at the end of the season and scoring a brace in an 8–1 win over Subiaco in the Charity Cup final. The opportunity to join Blackpool came as the state team prepared for Melbourne's football centenary carnival. Conduit found the net in a 3–2 win over HMS Sussex, whose team included seven first-class amateur players, who were clearly impressed by their performance. Two weeks later, he was offered to join the English second-tier club; A few days later, Conduit had accepted. Unfortunately it did not work out for Conduit and after being released by Blackpool, he returned to Perth in 1935, where he scored a hat-trick in the state team's 12–3 win over the Japanese Navy. He continued this form in the new season, scoring 14 goals in six games, including six against Thistle. Another four in the last round took his tally to 22 goals and gave Victoria Park back-to-back league titles. He scored again in a 4–1 Charity Cup win over Caledonians a few weeks later.

Conduit was in the mix most weekends of the 1936 season, as Victoria Park finished top of the table again. Along the way he scored a hat-trick against Claremont, kicked four goals in an Association Cup semi-final win over East Claremont and kicked five goals against Midland in the league's final fixture. However, he failed to find the back of the net in October's Challenge Cup final, which ended 1–1 after 140 minutes, with the referee playing four extra periods before declaring the trophy to be lifted by both Victoria Park and the Caledonians. Victoria Park were rarely troubled in 1937, winning the First Division title unbeaten, lifting the Association Cup and sharing the Challenge Cup for the second time with Caledonians. Conduit scored seven goals against Fremantle in two games, scored twice against Thistle, North Perth, Midland and East Claremont before scoring in the 4–1 Association Cup final win over Caledonians in October.

The following season began with Conduit in fine form, scoring eight goals in his first four league games, including a hat-trick away against the Maccabeans. Victoria Park won the league title largely thanks to Conduit's 29 goals, which made him the competition's top scorer. October began with two appearances and a goal for the State against India and ended with the Victoria Park captain lifting the Challenge Cup. Victoria Park won their sixth consecutive Division One title beating Caledonians 3–2 on the final day of the 1939 season Conduit's highlights of the year were a hat-trick against East Claremont and his final appearances for the team state against Maccabi, scoring three times across two friendly matches. In the title decider he put Victoria Park 2–1 up, but Caledonians sent the game into extra time, however his teammate A Henderson saved the day to find the late winner.

Conduit continued to do what he does best in this final season. The 35-year-old scored hat-tricks against the Northern Casuals and Fremantle before scoring two in the penultimate game of the 1940 season. Those two goals put Victoria Park in pole position to win the championship, but East Claremont equalized to steal the trophy by a single point. A reason for this may be due to Victoria Park being deducted two points at the start of the season for fielding an unregistered player.

== Death ==
Conduit died on 3 April 1985 at the age of 80. In 1996 the Football Hall of Fame Western Australia honoured him as one of 29 inaugural inductees into the Hall of Champions. Several years later he was named in the Century of Champions, which recognised the State's 100 greatest players between 1896 and 1996.

== Honours ==
Victoria Park

- West Australia League: 1928, 1929, 1931, 1934, 1935, 1936, 1937, 1938, 1939
- West Australia Charity Cup: 1928, 1931, 1932, 1933, 1934, 1935
- West Australia Challenge Cup: 1929, 1931, 1933, 1934, 1936, 1937, 1938, 1940

Individual

- West Australia League Top Scorer: 1928, 1929, 1930, 1931, 1932, 1938
