= Tommy Maras =

Australian soccer player

Personal information
- Full name: Thomas Peter Maras
- Date of birth: 13 September 1967 (age 59)
- Place of birth: Australia
- Position: Goalkeeper

Senior career*
Years	Team	Apps	(Gls)
1983–1988	Spearwood Dalmatinac	98	
1989–2001	Perth SC	248	(7)
1994–1995	Kuala Lumpur FA	29	(0)
1992, 1995	Happy Valley AA	35	(0)
1996–1999	Perth Glory Represented Western Australia	28 24	(1)
- * Club domestic league appearances and goals as of 9 August 2007 ‡ National team caps and goals as of 9 August 2007

Thomas Peter Maras (born 13 September 1967) is a retired Australian footballer. After retiring from the game he works as a registered builder and property developer in Perth. Inducted into the Western Australian soccer hall of fame in 2008.
