= Jakub Smug =

Polish footballer

Personal information
- Full name: Jakub Smug
- Date of birth: 23 February 1914
- Place of birth: Ustrzyki Dolne, Austrian Empire
- Date of death: 3 November 2010 (aged 96)
- Place of death: Gdańsk, Poland
- Height: 1.73 m (5 ft 8 in)
- Position: Defender

Senior career*
Years	Team	Apps	(Gls)
1931–1936	Świteź Lwów		
1936–1939	Pogoń Stryj		
1940–1941	Mołkia Stanisławów		
1945	Mołkia Stanisławów		
1945–1947	Polonia Bytom		
1947–1950	Lechia Gdańsk	3	(0)
1949–1951	Lechia Gdańsk II		
- * Club domestic league appearances and goals

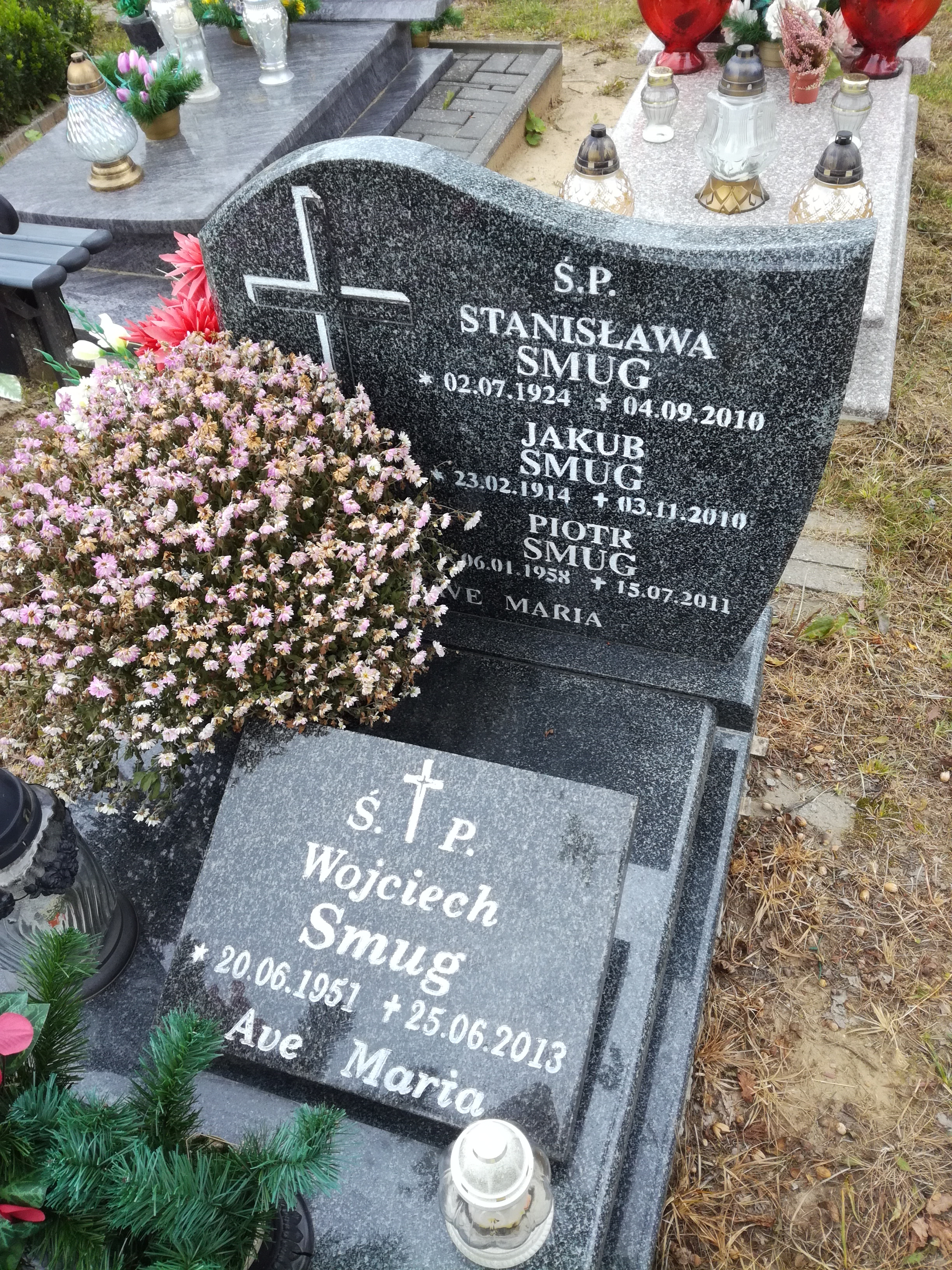
The grave of footballer Jakub Smug (1914-2010) at the Łostowicki Cemetery in Gdańsk.

Jakub Smug (23 February 1914 – 3 November 2010) was a Polish footballer who played as a defender.

== Biography ==
Smug was born in Ustrzyki Dolne, then part of the Austrian Empire just before the outbreak of World War 1. After the war, the area where he grew up in became the Second Polish Republic. At some point, he moved to Lviv to work in a factory. During his time at the factory, he was approached and asked to play for Świteź Lwów, with whom in his first game, aged 17, he scored both of the goals as Świteź beat Hasmonea Lviv 2–1. In 1936, he spent time in the army, afterwards playing with Pogoń Stryj from 1936 until 1939, as well as making appearances for the Lviv national team. During World War II, Smug spent his time in Stanisławów (now called Ivano-Frankivsk) and occasionally had to go into hiding.

After the war, he played with Polonia Bytom, which after a tour of Poland with the club he decided he wanted to live closer to his brother in Gdynia, so moved to Gdańsk and played with Lechia Gdańsk. He made his Lechia debut on 27 July 1947 against HCP Poznań. Most of his early Lechia appearances were in play-off games or in national cup competitions. It was not until 1949 when Smug played in the league for Lechia, playing three times in the I liga, the top league in Poland. His first I liga game was a 5–3 win against Ruch Chorzów, the club's first win in the top division. His final appearance for Lechia came on 13 November 1949 against Polonia Bytom. Lechia lost the game 8–0, which still stands as the club's record defeat.

After football, Smug continued to hold close links with Lechia Gdańsk, and in May 2010 he was honoured with a star on Lechia's "Avenue of Stars", a way the club has commemorated Lechia Gdańsk legends. He died on 3 November 2010, aged 96. His funeral took place on 6 November, and he is buried in the Łostowickie Cemetery, Gdańsk.
