= Wayne Andrews (cricketer) =

Australian cricketer (born 1958)

Personal information
- Full name: Wayne Stewart Andrews
- Born: 19 November 1958 (age 67); Melbourne, Victoria, Australia
- Batting: Left-handed
- Bowling: Slow left-arm orthodox
- Role: Batsman

Domestic team information
- Years: Team
- 1982–95: Western Australia

Career statistics
Competition	First-class	List A
Matches	91	47
Runs scored	4684	902
Batting average	37.17	33.40
100s/50s	5/32	1/5
Top score	139	103*
Balls bowled	3606	633
Wickets	40	13
Bowling average	39.52	36.53
5 wickets in innings	0	0
10 wickets in match	0	n/a
Best bowling	3/43	2/14
Catches/stumpings	71/–	15/–
- Source: CricketArchive, 21 June 2011

Wayne Stewart Andrews (born 19 November 1958) is an Australian cricketer, who played for Western Australia between 1982 and 1995.

== Early career ==
Andrews was born in Melbourne and moved to Western Australia at a young age. He appeared for the Western Australia Colts during the 1978–79 and 1979–80 seasons, and was also selected in FW Millett's XI which played a match against Ireland in Belfast in 1979.

== Playing career ==
=== Western Australia career ===
Andrews made his first-class debut for Western Australia against South Australia on 25 February 1983, at the Adelaide Oval, making 48 on debut batting at no. 6. He made his List A debut for Western Australia against Victoria in the semi-final of the 1982–83 McDonald's Cup, held at the WACA Ground in Perth.

In total, Andrews played 91 first-class matches, scoring 4684 runs at an average of 37.17, with a highest score of 139 achieved against New South Wales during the 1985–86 season at the WACA Ground. He also took 40 wickets at an average of 39.52 with 3/43 being his best bowling figures. He also played 47 List A matches, scoring 902 runs at an average of 33.40, with a highest score of 103*.

Andrews captained Western Australia in 10 Sheffield Shield matches in 1990 and 1991, and in a single domestic one-day match in 1990.

=== Lancashire League career ===
Andrews played 23 matches for Church in the Lancashire League as their professional during the 1987 English cricket season. He was both the club's leading run-scorer and wicket-taker, scoring 771 runs at an average of 38.55, with a highest of 112, and taking 60 wickets at an average of 15.21 bowling left-arm spin, including four 5-wicket hauls, with a best of 6/38.

== Recognition ==
On 28 July 2000, Andrews was awarded the Australian Sports Medal for his "91 Sheffield Shield career appearances for WA netting 4684 runs and 40 wickets".

== See also ==
- List of Western Australia first-class cricketers
