= Eric Bensted =

Australian cricketer

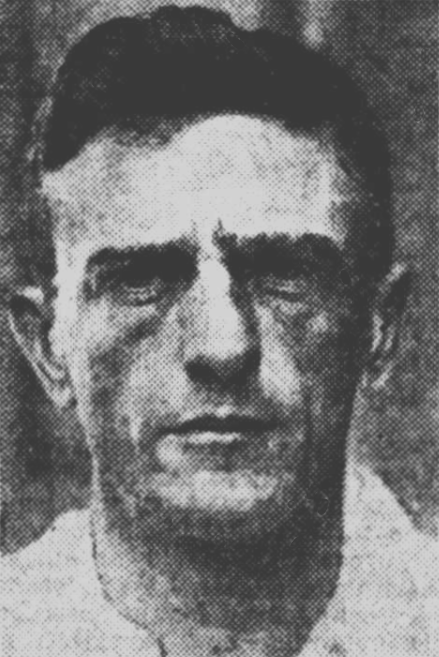

Personal information
- Full name: Eric Charles Bensted
- Born: 11 January 1901; Killarney, Queensland, Australia
- Died: 24 March 1980 (aged 79); Brisbane, Queensland
- Batting: Right-handed
- Bowling: Right-arm fast-medium

Domestic team information
- Years: Team
- 1923-24 to 1936-37: Queensland

Career statistics
Competition	First-class
Matches	58
Runs scored	2700
Batting average	26.73
100s/50s	3/15
Top score	155
Balls bowled	6,598
Wickets	76
Bowling average	43.34
5 wickets in innings	0
10 wickets in match	0
Best bowling	4/28
Catches/stumpings	38/–
- Source: Cricinfo, 27 October 2019

Eric Charles Bensted (11 February 1901 – 24 March 1980) was a cricketer who played first-class cricket for Queensland from 1923 to 1936.

Bensted, an all-rounder, was the first Queensland player to play in 50 Sheffield Shield matches. His highest score was 155 against New South Wales in 1934-35, when he and Cassie Andrews added 335 in 239 minutes for the seventh wicket after Queensland were 6 for 113. They set an Australian seventh-wicket record that stood until 2014.
