= Paweł Sobek =

Polish footballer (1929–2015)

Personal information
- Full name: Paweł Szczepan Sobek
- Date of birth: 23 December 1929
- Place of birth: Bytom, Second Polish Republic
- Date of death: 14 September 2015 (aged 85)
- Place of death: Perth, Australia
- Position: Forward

Youth career
- –1945: Fortuna Bytom

Senior career*
Years	Team	Apps	(Gls)
1945–1950	Szombierki Bytom		
1951	Górnik Radlin		
1951–1964	Szombierki Bytom		
1965	Cracovia		

International career
1952–1953	Poland	5	(1)
- * Club domestic league appearances and goals

Paweł Szczepan Sobek (23 December 1929 – 14 September 2015) was a Polish footballer who played as a forward.

== Club career ==
Sobek played for Szombierki Bytom and Górnik Radlin in the Ekstraklasa.

In 1965, he moved to Australia to play for Cracovia in Perth, Western Australia. After retiring, he was inducted into the West Australian Football Hall of Fame.

== International career ==
Sobek made five appearances for the Poland national team in full internationals, including one match at the 1952 Olympic Football tournament.
