= Cassie Andrews =

Australian cricketer

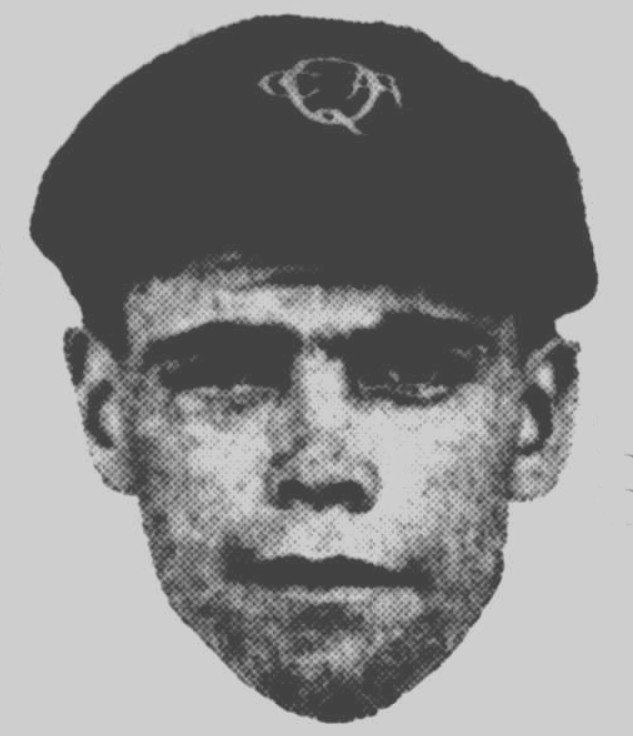

Personal information
- Full name: William Charles Andrews
- Born: 14 July 1908; West Maitland, Australia
- Died: 9 June 1962 (aged 53); Bombay, India

Domestic team information
- Years: Team
- 1928/29-1930/31: New South Wales
- 1931/32-1936/37: Queensland

Career statistics
Competition	First-class
Matches	39
Runs scored	2246
Batting average	31.63
100s/50s	3/9
Top score	253
Balls bowled	292
Wickets	6
Bowling average	31.83
5 wickets in innings	–
10 wickets in match	–
Best bowling	2/37
Catches/stumpings	17/–
- Source: Cricinfo, 27 July 2014

William Charles Andrews (14 July 1908 – 9 June 1962), better known as Cassie Andrews, was an Australian first class cricketer.

Opening the batting for Queensland against New South Wales in 1934-35, Andrews scored 253, adding 335 in 239 minutes for the seventh wicket with Eric Bensted after Queensland were 6 for 113, setting an Australian seventh-wicket record that stood until 2014.
