= Western Australia cricket team =

Australian domestic cricket team

Western Australia

Personnel
- Captain: First Class (Australia) Aaron Hardie List A (Australia) Ashton Turner
- Coach: (Australia) Beau Casson

Team information
- Colours: Gold Black
- Founded: 1893; 133 years ago
- Home ground: WACA Ground (1899–)
- Capacity: 10,000

History
- First-class debut: South Australia in 1893 at Adelaide Oval
- Sheffield Shield wins: 18 (1948, 1968, 1972, 1973, 1975, 1977, 1978, 1981, 1984, 1987, 1988, 1989, 1992, 1998, 1999, 2022, 2023, 2024)
- One-Day Cup wins: 17 (1971, 1974, 1977, 1978, 1983, 1986, 1990, 1991, 1997, 2000, 2004, 2014, 2017, 2019, 2021, 2022, 2023)
- Official website: WACA
First-class
One-day

The Western Australian men's cricket team, formerly nicknamed the Western Warriors, represent the Australian state of Western Australia in Australian domestic cricket. The team is selected and supported by the Western Australian Cricket Association (WACA), and plays its home games at the WACA Ground and Perth Stadium in Perth.

The team mainly plays matches against other Australian states in the first-class Sheffield Shield competition and the 50 over One-Day Cup, but occasionally plays matches against touring international sides. Western Australia previously also fielded sides at Twenty20 level, but was replaced by the Perth Scorchers for the inaugural 2011–12 season of the Big Bash League. Western Australia's current captains are Aaron Hardie in the Sheffield Shield and Ashton Turner in the One-Day Cup, and the current coach is Adam Voges.

== History ==
Western Australia played their opening first-class matches on a tour of the Eastern states during the 1892–93 season, playing two games, against South Australia at the Adelaide Oval, and against Victoria at the MCG. The team was captained by Herbert Orr.

They continued to play first-class matches against South Australia, Victoria and New South Wales, interspersed with matches against visiting teams from overseas, until they were admitted to the Sheffield Shield for the 1947–48 season. They played each other state only once a season at first, then beginning in 1956–57 they began playing each state twice, like the other teams.

Since joining the Sheffield Shield in 1947–48, Western Australia has won the competition 16 times, second only to New South Wales in that period. In the One-Day Cup, the team leads the winners table comfortably with 17 wins followed by New South Wales with twelve wins.

Western Australia men's team were known as the Warriors from 1995 to 2019. This logo was used from 2013 to 2019.

The state has a history of producing Australian Test players such as Justin Langer, Dennis Lillee, Adam Gilchrist, Michael Hussey, Terry Alderman and Geoff Marsh, along with Shaun Marsh, Marcus North, Adam Voges, and Mitchell Marsh in recent times. Englishman Tony Lock also represented his country in the 1967–68 season as a WA player – he was no longer attached to any English county.

Aside from test players, several Western Australian players have recently made their international debut in other forms of the game, such as Joel Paris with his One Day International debut, and Andrew Tye with his debut in international Twenty20 cricket.

Langer was appointed as coach of WA, along with the Perth Scorchers, in late 2012 and oversaw a period of success after almost a decade without silverware. Langer's Warriors won the 2014–15 One-Day Cup, while the side were Sheffield Shield runners-up in both 2013–14 and 2014–15. The Scorchers also went back-to-back in the Big Bash League in 2013–14 and 2014–15 along with a further title 2016–17.

Following Langer's appointment as Australian coach in 2018, recently retired captain and former test batsmen Adam Voges was selected as the Warriors new coach. Under Voges watch, WA won the 2019-20 One-Day Cup, but its struggles in ending its Sheffield Shield drought continued. They still produced more International players during this time, but mainly in limited overs cricket, with Jhye Richardson and Cameron Green both making test debuts in recent years.

The summer of 2021–22 became a highly successful summer for WA, winning another One-Day Cup (its second in three years with a win over New South Wales and fourth in a decade), while the Scorchers also took home its fourth BBL title, both being achieved despite being on the road for several weeks due to COVID-19 restrictions preventing both teams to play at home despite finishing first in both competitions. The Sheffield Shield, the one title that eluded WA for 23 years, was ended in a home draw against Victoria but won on first innings bonus points. Shaun Marsh captained the team to victory 21 years after his first-class debut.

== Honours ==
- Sheffield Shield (18)

1948, 1968, 1972, 1973, 1975, 1977, 1978, 1981, 1984, 1987, 1988, 1989, 1992, 1998, 1999, 2021, 2022, 2023

- One-Day Cup (16)

1971, 1974, 1977, 1978, 1983, 1986, 1990, 1991, 1997, 2000, 2004, 2014, 2017, 2019, 2021, 2022, 2023

== Identity ==
The Western Australian team's uniform has largely remained unchanged with a black baggy cap used for its Sheffield Shield uniform, and a gold shirt with black trousers used for its One-Day Cup uniform. Previously, the WA team wore a predominantly black uniform for the former state based Big Bash competition. The team is currently sponsored by Healthway WA's alcohol health problem related program, "Alcohol: Think Again", after being associated with electronics retailer Retravision for over 20 years.

Prior to adopting a nickname, the Western Australian team was known under the state's name or the WACA name. In 1995, the ACB announced that all state cricket associations, including the WACA, would give their state teams nicknames, with the Warriors name chosen for the WA men's team due to the state team's history of being resilient.

In 2014, following a rebrand for the WACA, the team returned to using baggy black caps, after using baggy gold caps since the 1970s. The rest of the teams uniform remained unchanged.

In 2019, the WACA announced that the Warriors nickname, along with the Fury name for the women's team, would be discontinued for both teams.

== Current squad ==
Sources: WACA Players with international caps are listed in bold.

No.	Name	Nationality	Birth date	Batting style	Bowling style	Contract Type & Notes
Batters
35	**Hilton Cartwright**	Australia	14 February 1992 (age 34)	Right-handed	Right-arm medium	
28	Sam Fanning	Australia	20 October 2000 (age 26)	Left-handed	—N/a	
7	Jayden Goodwin	Australia	13 December 2001 (age 24)	Right-handed	Right-arm leg break	Rookie contract
59	Corey Wasley	Australia	12 July 2005 (age 21)	Left-handed	Right-arm off break	
48	Teague Wyllie	Australia	14 April 2004 (age 22)	Right-handed	—N/a	
All-rounders
8	**Cooper Connolly**	Australia	22 August 2003 (age 23)	Left-handed	Slow left-arm orthodox	
12	Keaton Critchell	Australia	11 January 1997 (age 29)	Right-handed	Right-arm fast-medium	
31	**Cameron Green**	Australia	3 June 1999 (age 27)	Right-handed	Right-arm fast-medium	Cricket Australia contract
21	**Aaron Hardie**	Australia	7 January 1999 (age 27)	Right-handed	Right-arm medium-fast	
10	**Mitch Marsh**	Australia	20 October 1991 (age 35)	Right-handed	Right-arm fast-medium	Cricket Australia contract
23	**D'Arcy Short**	Australia	9 August 1990 (age 36)	Left-handed	Left-arm unorthodox	
17	**Ashton Turner**	Australia	25 January 1993 (age 33)	Right-handed	Right-arm off break	List A captain
Wicket-keepers
11	**Cameron Bancroft**	Australia	19 November 1992 (age 33)	Right-handed	Right-arm off break	
11	Baxter Holt	Australia	21 October 1999 (age 27)	Right-handed	Right-arm off break	
95	**Josh Inglis**	Australia	4 May 1995 (age 31)	Right-handed	—N/a	Cricket Australia contract
9	Sam Whiteman	Australia	19 March 1992 (age 34)	Left-handed	—N/a	FC captain
Spin bowlers
18	**Ashton Agar**	Australia	14 October 1993 (age 33)	Left-handed	Slow left-arm orthodox	Cricket Australia contract
-	Hamish McKenzie	Australia	21 September 1999 (age 27)	Left-handed	Left-arm unorthodox	
77	Corey Rocchiccioli	Australia	8 October 1997 (age 29)	Right-handed	Right-arm off break	
Pace bowlers
42	Mahli Beardman	Australia	31 August 2005 (age 21)	Right-handed	Right-arm fast	
5	**Jason Behrendorff**	Australia	20 April 1990 (age 36)	Right-handed	Left-arm fast-medium	
26	Brody Couch	Australia	5 December 1999 (age 26)	Right-handed	Right-arm fast	
24	**Cameron Gannon**	United States	23 January 1989 (age 37)	Right-handed	Right-arm fast-medium	Australian passport
84	Sam Greer	Australia	–	Right-handed	Right-arm fast-medium	
25	Liam Haskett	Australia	31 May 2001 (age 25)	Right-handed	Left-arm fast-medium	
26	Bryce Jackson	Australia	28 November 1999 (age 26)	Right-handed	Right-arm fast-medium	
12	Matt Kelly	Australia	7 December 1994 (age 31)	Right-handed	Right-arm fast-medium	
1	**Lance Morris**	Australia	28 March 1998 (age 28)	Right-handed	Right-arm fast	Cricket Australia contract
3	**Joel Paris**	Australia	12 November 1992 (age 33)	Left-handed	Left-arm fast-medium	
2	**Jhye Richardson**	Australia	20 September 1996 (age 30)	Right-handed	Right-arm fast	Cricket Australia contract
13	Charlie Stobo	Australia	8 March 1995 (age 31)	Right-handed	Right-arm medium	
68	**Andrew Tye**	Australia	12 December 1986 (age 39)	Right-handed	Right-arm fast-medium	Marsh Cup squad
26	Josh Vernon	Australia	2 May 2005 (age 21)	Right-handed	Right-arm medium	

== Coaching staff ==
- Head coach: Adam Voges
- Assistant coach: Geoff Marsh
- Development coach - Under 19s: Wayne Andrews
- Physiotherapist: Nick Jones
- Strength & Conditioning Coordinator: Warren Andrews
- Performance analysis Coordinator: Dean Plunkett

== See also ==
- Cricket in Western Australia
- Western Australia women's cricket team
- Perth Scorchers
