= List of Western Australia List A cricketers =

In List A cricket, Western Australia have played 299 matches, winning 168, losing 124, tying one and having nine matches either abandoned or ending in no result. Western Australia played its first List A match against South Australia in the quarter-final of 1969–70 Vehicle & General Australasian Knockout Cup. In total, 166 players have represented Western Australia. The team has played most of its matches in the Australian domestic limited-overs competition, but has also played matches against touring international sides. Western Australia is the most successful team in Australia domestic one-day history, having won the tournament 12 times and finished runners-up ten times since the tournament's inception. Western Australia also won the 2000–01 Champions Cup.

== List of players ==
Statistics are only for matches played for Western Australia
Players currently holding a state contract are marked with an asterisk (*)
Players who have played international cricket are highlighted in blue
Statistics are correct as of the 2017–18 JLT One-Day Cup season:

No.	Name	Nat	First	Last	Mat	Runs	HS	Avg	100	50	Wkt	BB	Ave	4wi	C	St	Ref
1	Terry Prindiville	(Australia)	1969–70	1970–71	3	27	21	9.00	0	0	1	1/46	46.00	0	0	0	
2	Derek Chadwick	(Australia)	1969–70	1971–72	8	103	24	14.71	0	0	–	–	–	–	3	0	
3	John Inverarity	(Australia)	1969–70	1978–79	20	458	90	30.53	0	4	13	3/19	21.92	0	17	0	
4	Rod Marsh	(Australia)	1969–70	1983–84	34	762	99*	31.75	0	5	–	–	–	–	51	1	
5	Ian Brayshaw	(Australia)	1969–70	1977–78	19	245	58*	22.27	0	2	17	3/28	24.47	0	3	0	
6	Bob Meuleman	(Australia)	1969–70	1970–71	3	66	49	22.00	0	0	–	–	–	–	1	0	
7	Ross Edwards	(Australia)	1969–70	1974–75	15	228	45*	19.00	0	0	–	–	–	–	14	0	
8	Tony Mann	(Australia)	1969–70	1983–84	13	162	59*	20.25	0	1	5	2/34	36.80	0	6	0	
9	Tony Lock	(England)	1969–70	1970–71	6	1	1	0.33	0	0	10	3/20	18.30	0	3	0	
10	Sam Gannon	(Australia)	1969–70	1978–79	10	4	3*	4.00	0	0	17	4/21	20.94	2	5	0	
11	Bob Massie	(Australia)	1969–70	1973–74	9	1	1	1.00	0	0	11	2/12	21.90	0	0	0	
12	Dennis Lillee	(Australia)	1969–70	1983–84	26	117	32	8.35	0	0	48	4/21	15.92	2	5	0	
13	Jock Irvine	(Australia)	1970–71	1970–71	3	87	50	43.50	0	1	–	–	–	–	1	0	
14	Graham McKenzie	(Australia)	1969–70	1983–84	6	32	25	16.00	0	0	13	4/13	10.61	1	0	0	
15	Ken McAullay	(Australia)	1970–71	1973–74	6	128	74	25.60	0	1	–	–	–	–	1	0	
16	Les Varis	(Australia)	1970–71	1971–72	5	45	19*	22.50	0	0	5	2/26	23.00	0	2	0	
17	Brian Hanna	(Australia)	1970–71	1972–73	3	8	8	2.66	0	0	–	–	–	–	0	0	
18	Graeme Watson	(Australia)	1971–72	1974–75	8	263	99	37.57	0	2	11	2/31	24.72	0	5	0	
19	Barry Thornton	(Australia)	1971–72	1971–72	1	–	–	–	–	–	0	0/44	–	0	0	0	
20	Terry MacGill	(Australia)	1970–71	1970–71	1	13	13	13.00	0	0	–	–	–	–	0	0	
21	Bruce Duperouzel	(Australia)	1971–72	1971–72	1	–	–	–	–	–	–	–	–	–	0	0	
22	Paul Nicholls	(Australia)	1972–73	1973–74	2	38	34	19.00	0	0	3	3/28	9.33	0	0	0	
23	Bruce Yardley	(Australia)	1973–74	1982–83	22	289	59*	22.23	0	1	16	2/30	42.25	0	6	0	
24	Jim Hubble	(Australia)	1973–74	1973–74	2	13	13*	–	0	0	3	3/27	23.33	0	0	0	
25	Dennis Baker	(Australia)	1973–74	1981–82	9	32	21*	32.00	0	0	15	4/35	19.13	1	1	0	
26	Wally Edwards	(Australia)	1973–74	1975–76	7	180	54	25.71	0	2	–	–	–	–	2	0	
27	Rob Langer	(Australia)	1973–74	1981–82	15	338	99*	28.16	0	1	2	2/18	25.00	0	6	0	
28	Wayne Clark	(Australia)	1973–74	1984–85	27	21	8*	2.62	0	0	26	4/20	35.57	1	5	0	
29	Bruce Laird	(Australia)	1974–75	1983–84	24	487	62	20.29	0	3	–	–	–	–	10	0	
30	Terry Alderman	(Australia)	1974–75	1992–93	45	49	24*	9.80	0	0	58	4/14	25.70	2	15	0	
31	Mick Malone	(Australia)	1974–75	1981–82	19	189	47*	21.00	0	0	26	4/30	22.53	1	4	0	
32	Kim Hughes	(Australia)	1975–76	1987–88	30	619	69	22.10	0	4	0	0/2	–	0	9	0	
33	Ric Charlesworth	(Australia)	1975–76	1979–80	12	154	33	14.00	0	0	–	–	–	–	5	0	
34	Craig Serjeant	(Australia)	1976–77	1981–82	19	539	65	33.68	0	2	–	–	–	–	12	0	
35	Tom Mullooly	(Australia)	1976–77	1976–77	1	–	–	–	–	–	1	1/54	54.00	0	0	0	
36	Graeme Wood	(Australia)	1977–78	1991–92	50	1211	108	29.53	1	6	0	0/16	–	0	15	0	
37	Kevin Wright	(Australia)	1977–78	1979–80	5	15	12*	15.00	0	0	–	–	–	–	8	1	
38	Graeme Porter	(Australia)	1979–80	1986–87	12	33	16	6.60	0	0	19	4/49	18.52	1	1	0	
39	Ken McEwan	(South Africa)	1979–80	1980–81	10	257	99	28.55	0	2	–	–	–	–	4	0	
40	Greg Shipperd	(Australia)	1979–80	1987–88	17	594	86	45.69	0	5	–	–	–	–	7	0	
41	Mark O'Neill	(Australia)	1979–80	1980–81	6	113	52	22.60	0	1	7	3/27	23.28	0	4	0	
42	Tim Zoehrer	(Australia)	1980–81	1993–94	46	637	83	28.95	0	3	0	0/30	–	0	54	4	
43	Darryl Smith	(Australia)	1980–81	1984–85	4	43	42	21.50	0	0	6	4/24	23.83	1	2	0	
44	Wayne Daniel	(Barbados)	1981–82	1981–82	1	–	–	–	–	–	0	0/58	–	0	0	0	
45	David Boyd	(Australia)	1981–82	1983–84	9	26	13*	6.50	0	0	15	5/15	18.33	2	0	0	
46	Ken MacLeay	(Australia)	1981–82	1991–92	45	366	39	17.42	0	0	59	5/30	23.13	2	9	0	
47	Geoff Marsh	(Australia)	1981–82	1993–94	46	1708	110	47.44	3	13	–	–	–	–	22	0	
48	Shane Clements	(Australia)	1981–82	1984–85	8	123	35	17.57	0	0	1	1/61	61.00	0	2	0	
49	Geoff Millar	(Australia)	1981–82	1982–83	3	31	30	15.50	0	0	4	2/17	24.25	0	2	0	
50	Tom Hogan	(Australia)	1981–82	1990–91	19	114	33	19.00	0	0	18	3/25	41.05	0	6	0	
51	Wayne Andrews	(Australia)	1982–83	1994–95	47	902	103*	33.40	1	5	13	2/14	36.53	0	15	0	
52	Mike Veletta	(Australia)	1983–84	1994–95	54	1281	105*	32.02	1	9	–	–	–	–	28	1	
53	Shaun Graf	(Australia)	1983–84	1983–84	3	46	37*	–	0	0	4	3/26	28.25	0	1	0	
54	Wayne Hill	(Australia)	1984–85	1984–85	1	–	–	–	–	–	–	–	–	–	1	0	
55	Peter Clough	(Australia)	1984–85	1985–86	3	12	12*	–	0	0	4	2/36	32.50	0	1	0	
56	Mark McPhee	(Australia)	1985–86	1993–94	17	594	97	37.12	0	5	–	–	–	–	6	0	
57	Tom Moody	(Australia)	1985–86	2000–01	88	2402	102*	34.81	2	16	80	4/30	29.20	1	29	0	
58	Chris Matthews	(Australia)	1985–86	1990–91	20	103	29	9.36	0	0	28	3/32	22.32	0	1	0	
59	Bruce Reid	(Australia)	1985–86	1995–96	28	17	13*	8.50	0	0	32	4/40	26.34	1	4	0	
60	Gary Ireland	(Australia)	1985–86	1986–87	2	18	10	9.00	0	0	–	–	–	–	0	0	
61	Giles Bush	(Australia)	1985–86	1985–86	1	–	–	–	–	–	0	0/30	–	0	0	0	
62	Peter Gonnella	(Australia)	1985–86	1989–90	8	180	52	36.00	0	1	–	–	–	–	1	0	
63	Robert Gartrell	(Australia)	1985–86	1985–86	3	15	14*	15.00	0	0	–	–	–	–	2	0	
64	Michael Cox	(Australia)	1985–86	1986–87	5	61	38	20.33	0	0	–	–	–	–	10	0	
65	Todd Breman	(Australia)	1985–86	1987–88	5	32	21	16.00	0	0	4	2/64	48.25	0	10	0	
66	Vic Marks	(England)	1986–87	1986–87	2	19	19	19.00	0	0	0	0/37	–	0	0	0	
67	Peter Capes	(Australia)	1987–88	1990–91	17	30	12	7.50	0	0	15	3/25	37.93	0	3	0	
68	Steve Milosz	(Australia)	1987–88	1987–88	2	5	3*	–	0	0	2	2/60	48.00	0	0	0	
69	Peter Henderson	(Australia)	1987–88	1987–88	1	2	2*	–	0	0	0	0/50	–	0	0	0	
70	James Brayshaw	(Australia)	1988–89	1989–90	9	125	55*	41.66	0	1	–	–	–	–	4	0	
71	Alan Mullally	(England)	1988–89	1989–90	6	–	–	–	–	–	9	3/30	23.11	0	3	0	
72	Ken Lilly	(Australia)	1988–89	1988–89	1	–	–	–	–	–	1	1/19	19.00	0	0	0	
73	Steve Russell	(Australia)	1989–90	1993–94	7	48	34	24.00	0	0	5	2/50	52.60	0	2	0	
74	Darrin Ramshaw	(Australia)	1989–90	1989–90	2	15	15	7.50	0	0	–	–	–	–	1	0	
75	Brendon Julian	(Australia)	1989–90	2000–01	65	667	64	14.82	0	1	73	4/41	29.49	2	18	0	
76	Mark Palmer	(Australia)	1989–90	1989–90	1	0	0	0.00	0	0	–	–	–	–	2	0	
77	Chris Mack	(Australia)	1989–90	1989–90	3	–	–	–	–	–	4	2/34	23.50	0	1	0	
78	Mark Lavender	(Australia)	1991–92	1996–97	30	931	100	35.80	1	8	–	–	–	–	8	0	
79	Damien Martyn	(Australia)	1991–92	2005–06	66	2446	140	47.96	4	19	23	3/3	17.73	0	22	0	
80	Martin McCague	(England) (Northern Ireland)	1991–92	1991–92	6	1	1	0.50	0	0	7	4/34	22.42	1	2	0	
81	Justin Langer	(Australia)	1992–93	2007–08	110	3811	146	40.54	8	26	–	–	–	–	55	0	
82	Jo Angel	(Australia)	1992–93	2003–04	82	78	19*	6.50	0	0	105	5/16	26.74	3	8	0	
83	Mark Atkinson	(Australia)	1992–93	2000–01	31	136	31	9.06	0	0	39	4/38	29.53	1	10	0	
84	Rob Kelly	(Australia)	1992–93	1994–95	4	60	20	15.00	0	0	–	–	–	–	2	0	
85	Jamie Stewart	(Australia)	1992–93	1998–99	36	78	14	9.75	0	0	39	4/34	32.05	1	8	0	
86	Duncan Spencer	(England)	1993–94	2000–01	10	19	10	4.75	0	0	15	4/35	27.46	2	3	0	
87	Brad Hogg	(Australia)	1993–94	2007–08	83	1280	59	29.76	0	2	66	4/37	32.00	2	37	0	
88	Craig Coulson	(Australia)	1993–94	1994–95	6	4	4*	4.00	0	0	8	3/31	30.00	0	1	0	
89	Adam Gilchrist	(Australia)	1994–95	2007–08	45	1264	131	34.16	2	7	–	–	–	–	77	7	
90	Murray Goodwin	(Zimbabwe)	1994–95	2004–05	56	1673	167	37.17	1	12	–	–	–	–	20	0	
91	Sean Cary	(Australia)	1994–95	2001–02	16	8	7*	–	0	0	11	2/25	47.72	0	3	0	
92	David Fitzgerald	(Australia)	1994–95	1994–95	1	32	32	32.00	0	0	–	–	–	–	1	0	
93	Jeremy Allen	(Australia)	1994–95	1994–95	1	12	12*	–	0	0	3	3/62	20.66	0	0	0	
94	Kade Harvey	(Australia)	1994–95	2004–05	86	829	53*	21.81	0	2	115	4/8	26.09	7	14	0	
95	Simon Katich	(Australia)	1995–96	2013–14	47	1510	118	36.82	2	12	1	1/16	58.00	0	16	0	
96	Rob Baker	(Australia)	1995–96	2001–02	29	367	55	19.31	0	1	9	3/25	41.11	0	6	0	
97	Ryan Campbell	(Australia)	1995–96	2005–06	79	1684	108	22.45	1	7	–	–	–	–	109	8	
98	Michael Hussey	(Australia)	1996–97	2012–13	91	2918	106	39.43	3	23	12	3/52	29.00	0	49	0	
99	Matt Mason	(Australia) (Republic of Ireland)	1996–97	1997–98	2	2	2	2.00	0	0	3	2/61	34.33	0	1	0	
100	Michael Dighton	(Australia)	1997–98	1999–00	5	28	18	7.00	0	0	–	–	–	–	1	0	
101	Steven Glew	(Australia)	1997–98	1997–98	1	2	2	2.00	0	0	–	–	–	–	0	0	
101	Chris Rogers	(Australia)	1998–99	2007–08	46	1184	117*	30.35	1	6	–	–	–	–	20	0	
102	Matthew Nicholson	(Australia)	1998–99	2002–03	14	67	21	13.40	0	0	9	2/23	48.22	0	3	0	
103	Brad Oldroyd	(Australia)	1998–99	2001–02	8	8	5	8.00	0	0	6	2/36	45.33	0	2	0	
104	Darren Wates	(Australia)	1999–00	2007–08	50	323	44*	21.53	0	0	52	3/27	38.48	0	8	0	
105	Brad Williams	(Australia)	1999–00	2005–06	38	88	23	12.57	0	0	63	4/29	22.92	5	6	0	
106	Steve Nikitaras	(Australia)	1999–00	2000–01	10	6	6	6.00	0	0	7	3/30	44.85	0	2	0	
107	Stuart Karppinen	(Australia)	1999–00	2002–03	12	59	23	14.75	0	0	5	2/40	78.00	0	5	0	
108	Marcus North	(Australia)	1999–00	2013–14	90	3053	134*	41.82	5	22	41	3/26	30.46	0	36	0	
109	Peter Worthington	(Australia)	2000–01	2002–03	26	260	54	23.63	0	2	32	4/36	30.15	1	8	0	
110	Scott Meuleman	(Australia)	2001–02	2006–07	17	456	71	30.40	0	3	–	–	–	–	4	0	
111	Luke Ronchi	(Australia) (New Zealand)	2001–02	2011–12	74	1809	113*	28.26	4	11	–	–	–	–	109	15	
112	Michael Clark	(Australia)	2000–01	2004–05	12	58	27	29.00	0	0	17	3/34	30.58	0	5	0	
113	Shaun Marsh*	(Australia)	2002–03	2017–18	76	2960	186	42.89	8	15	1	1/14	31.00	0	30	0	
114	Paul Wilson	(Australia)	2002–03	2003–04	20	5	5	5.00	0	0	15	2/21	45.60	0	3	0	
115	Callum Thorp	(Australia)	2002–03	2003–04	10	16	12	16.00	0	0	14	4/46	30.14	1	2	0	
116	Beau Casson	(Australia)	2002–03	2003–04	19	47	18	7.83	0	0	15	4/31	30.20	1	3	0	
117	Michael Thistle	(Australia)	2003–04	2003–04	2	–	–	–	–	–	4	3/32	21.50	0	0	0	
118	John Taylor	(Australia)	2003–04	2003–04	8	47	34	11.75	0	0	11	3/27	26.36	0	0	0	
119	Aaron Heal	(Australia)	2003–04	2010–11	36	250	50	13.88	0	1	40	4/58	37.92	1	7	0	
120	Ben Edmondson	(Australia)	2003–04	2011–12	30	52	16*	10.40	0	0	46	5/39	29.47	2	3	0	
121	Adam Voges*	(Australia)	2004–05	2016–17	85	2832	112	41.04	3	22	21	3/20	45.80	0	39	0	
122	Steve Magoffin	(Australia)	2004–05	2009–10	38	147	24	14.70	0	0	47	3/29	32.08	0	11	0	
123	Brett Dorey	(Australia)	2004–05	2010–11	42	219	45	9.52	0	0	54	5/48	30.79	2	15	0	
124	Mathew Inness	(Australia)	2005–06	2005–06	3	0	0*	–	0	0	1	1/36	113.00	0	2	0	
125	David Bandy	(Australia)	2005–06	2010–11	20	288	54	26.18	0	1	8	2/21	40.75	0	9	0	
126	Matthew Petrie	(Australia)	2005–06	2005–06	3	–	–	–	–	–	2	1/34	56.50	0	0	0	
127	Liam Davis*	(Australia)	2005–06	2012–13	26	854	116*	34.16	2	2	–	–	–	–	3	0	
128	Shawn Gillies	(Australia)	2005–06	2007–08	5	23	10	7.66	0	0	3	3/50	52.00	0	4	0	
129	Sean Ervine	(Zimbabwe)	2006–07	2007–08	13	291	134*	32.33	1	0	9	4/51	40.77	1	6	0	
130	Luke Pomersbach	(Australia)	2006–07	2010–11	33	599	104*	21.39	1	1	0	0/16	–	0	18	0	
131	Matt Johnston	(Australia)	2007–08	2010–11	16	209	44	29.85	0	0	5	4/28	24.60	1	1	0	
132	Danny McLauchlan	(Australia)	2007–08	2007–08	6	22	18	7.33	0	0	6	4/50	50.00	1	2	0	
133	Theo Doropoulos	(Australia)	2007–08	2009–10	20	473	92	26.27	0	4	2	1/14	87.50	0	6	0	
134	Paul Davis	(Australia)	2007–08	2008–09	5	25	12	8.33	0	0	7	3/49	32.57	0	1	0	
135	Trent Kelly	(Australia)	2008–09	2008–09	3	–	–	–	–	–	5	3/31	22.40	0	0	0	
136	Michael Johnson	(Australia)	2008–09	2008–09	2	16	14	8.00	0	0	–	–	–	–	2	0	
137	Marcus Stoinis	(Australia)	2008–09	2009–10	4	63	24	15.75	0	0	–	–	–	–	1	0	
138	Justin Coetzee	(Australia)	2008–09	2009–10	5	49	39	16.33	0	0	1	1/33	135.00	0	0	0	
139	Mitch Marsh*	(Australia)	2008–09	2017–18	37	1190	124	44.07	2	7	19	4/40	30.42	1	20	0	
140	Drew Porter	(Australia)	2008–09	2011–12	4	43	36*	14.33	0	0	1	1/40	83.00	0	2	0	
141	Brad Knowles	(Australia)	2008–09	2009–10	10	50	23	16.66	0	0	15	5/62	28.46	1	3	0	
142	Craig Simmons	(Australia)	2008–09	2014–15	13	313	98	24.07	0	2	–	–	–	–	1	0	
143	Wes Robinson	(Australia)	2009–10	2011–12	16	561	87	35.06	0	5	–	–	–	–	3	0	
144	Ashley Noffke	(Australia)	2009–10	2010–11	8	99	43	14.14	0	0	10	3/43	32.90	0	1	0	
145	Michael Hogan	(Australia)	2009–10	2012–13	25	67	27	13.40	0	0	35	5/44	32.28	2	8	0	
146	Luke Towers	(Australia)	2009–10	2009–10	2	12	6	6.00	0	0	–	–	–	–	1	0	
147	Jake Fawcett	(Australia)	2009–10	2009–10	2	15	15	7.50	0	0	0	0/7	–	0	1	0	
148	Nathan Coulter-Nile*	(Australia)	2009–10	2017–18	28	292	53*	20.85	0	1	56	5/26	22.89	4	13	0	
149	Michael Swart	(Australia) (Netherlands)	2009–10	2010–11	5	82	56	16.40	0	1	0	0/9	–	0	1	0	
150	Michael Beer	(Australia)	2010–11	2014–15	21	59	13*	9.83	0	0	18	3/39	44.61	0	3	0	
151	Ryan Duffield*	(Australia)	2010–11	2013–14	12	37	18*	18.50	0	0	14	4/58	40.85	1	2	0	
152	Matt Dixon*	(Australia)	2010–11	2011–12	4	1	1	1.00	0	0	2	1/39	68.50	0	1	0	
153	Tom Beaton*	(Australia)	2010–11	2011–12	11	268	71	26.80	0	2	–	–	–	–	2	0	
154	Marcus Harris*	(Australia)	2010–11	2014–15	13	284	69	21.84	0	1	–	–	–	–	1	0	
155	Phil Adams	(Australia)	2010–11	2010–11	2	10	5	5.00	0	0	–	–	–	–	2	0	
156	Jason Behrendorff*	(Australia)	2010–11	2017–18	33	110	24*	10.00	0	0	38	5/27	30.57	1	8	0	
157	Cameron Bancroft*	(Australia)	2011–12	2017–18	30	911	176	36.44	1	7	–	–	–	–	20	0	
158	Travis Birt*	(Australia)	2011–12	2012–13	11	162	35	14.72	0	0	–	–	–	–	3	0	
159	Nathan Rimmington*	(Australia)	2011–12	2016–17	27	309	55	22.07	0	1	27	4/34	40.14	2	3	0	
160	D'Arcy Short*	(Australia)	2011–12	2017–18	12	228	119*	32.57	1	1	12	3/53	33.75	0	4	0	
161	Tim Armstrong	(Australia)	2011–12	2012–13	2	1	1	0.50	0	0	1	1/15	53.00	0	1	0	
162	Sam Whiteman*	(Australia)	2012–13	2016–17	33	518	74	20.72	0	2	–	–	–	–	29	3	
163	Tom Triffitt	(Australia)	2012–13	2012–13	5	40	17	8.00	0	0	–	–	–	–	5	0	
164	Mitchell Johnson	(Australia)	2012–13	2015–16	6	45	16	9.00	0	0	15	5/31	17.33	1	1	0	
165	Will Bosisto*	(Australia)	2012–13	2012–13	1	0	0	0.00	0	0	–	–	–	–	0	0	
166	Hilton Cartwright*	(Australia)	2012–13	2017–18	22	311	35	19.43	0	0	9	2/14	41.00	0	7	0	
167	John Rogers*	(Australia)	2012–13	2013–14	9	158	68	19.75	0	1	–	–	–	–	0	0	
168	Ashton Agar*	(Australia)	2012–13	2016–17	20	283	64	25.72	0	1	20	3/8	38.85	0	10	0	
168	Joel Paris*	(Australia)	2012–13	2015–16	13	39	16*	39.00	0	0	24	4/13	17.79	1	6	0	
169	Ashton Turner*	(Australia)	2012–13	2017–18	17	154	51	51.33	0	1	1	1/32	114.00	0	1	0	
170	Burt Cockley	(Australia)	2012–13	2013–14	2	0	0	0.00	0	0	2	2/91	84.00	0	1	0	
171	Andrew Tye*	(Australia)	2013–14	2017–18	24	135	28*	15.00	0	0	50	5/46	21.32	3	8	0	
172	Michael Klinger	(Australia)	2014–15	2017–18	25	1061	143	46.13	2	5	–	–	–	–	9	0	
173	Simon Mackin*	(Australia)	2014–15	2017–18	6	0	-	-	-	-	10	5/33	28.50	1	0	0	
174	Jhye Richardson*	(Australia)	2015–16	2017–18	8	30	17	15.00	0	0	13	3/60	30.00	0	5	0	
175	David Moody*	(Australia)	2016–17	2017–18	8	2	1	–	0	0	8	3/47	41.25	0	3	0	
176	Jonathan Wells*	(Australia)	2016–17	2017–18	4	130	57	0	1	–	–	–	–	1	0		
177	Matthew Kelly*	(Australia)	2017–18	2017–18	4	–	–	–	0	0	0	0/34	-	0	1	0	

== See also ==
- List of Western Australia first-class cricketers
- List of Western Australia Twenty20 cricketers
- List of Western Australia cricket captains
