= List of Western Australia Twenty20 cricketers =

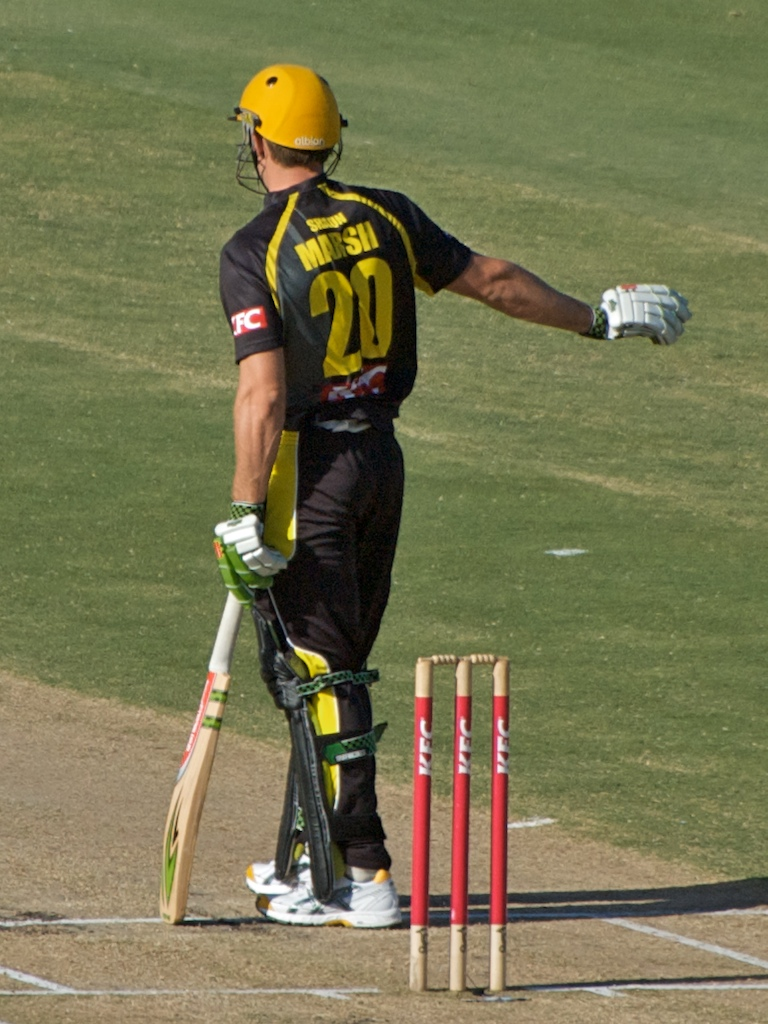
Shaun Marsh (pictured) scored the most runs for Western Australia during its time in the KFC Twenty20 Big Bash.

In Twenty20 cricket, Western Australia (nicknamed the Warriors) played 31 matches between 2006 and 2011, all in the KFC Twenty20 Big Bash. The team made its Twenty20 debut in the 2005–06 competition. Western Australia finished second in the 2007–08 competition, qualifying them for the 2008 Champions League Twenty20 in India, which was later canceled due to political unrest. After the 2010–11 season, the competition was replaced by the Big Bash League, with Western Australia replaced by the Perth Scorchers franchise. Although the team is currently defunct, in total, 44 players represented Western Australia at Twenty20 cricket.

== Key ==
General

- ‡ – captain
- † – wicket-keeper
- Nat – nationality
- First – date of debut
- Last – date of latest game
- M – number of matches played

Batting

- HS – highest score
- Avg – runs scored per dismissal
- 100 – number of centuries
- 50 – number of half-centuries scored
- * – batsman remained not out

Bowling

- W – wickets taken in career
- BBI – best bowling in an innings
- Ave – runs per wicket
- 3wi – number of four-wicket hauls

Fielding

- C – catches taken
- St – stumpings effected

== List of players ==
Statistics are correct as of 15 June 2013, and include only Twenty20 matches played for Western Australia:

No.	Name	Nat	First	Last	Mat	Runs	HS	Avg	100	50	Wkt	BB	Ave	3wi	C	St	Ref
1	Luke Ronchi †	(Australia)	6 Jan. 2006	27 Jan. 2011	26	509	76	23.13	0	2	–	–	–	–	21	8	Ref
2	Ryan Campbell	(Australia)	6 Jan. 2006	10 Jan. 2006	2	56	55	27.50	0	1	2	2/26	16.50	0	1	0	
3	Adam Voges ‡	(Australia)	6 Jan. 2006	27 Jan. 2011	28	683	74*	27.32	0	2	7	1/2	34.71	0	8	0	
4	Damien Martyn	(Australia)	6 Jan. 2006	6 Jan. 2006	1	36	36	36.00	0	0	–	–	–	–	2	0	
5	Marcus North ‡	(Australia)	6 Jan. 2006	27 Jan. 2011	15	290	59	24.16	0	1	5	2/19	41.40	0	3	0	
6	Shaun Marsh	(Australia)	6 Jan. 2006	18 Jan. 2011	23	792	108*	39.60	1	5	0	0/13	–	0	10	0	
7	David Bandy	(Australia)	6 Jan. 2006	29 Dec. 2009	13	145	52*	20.71	0	1	9	2/26	26.66	0	5	0	
8	Brad Hogg	(Australia)	6 Jan. 2006	10 Jan. 2007	4	32	26	32.00	0	0	8	3/19	14.12	2	3	0	
9	Peter Worthington	(Australia)	6 Jan. 2006	10 Jan. 2007	5	14	6*	7.00	0	0	4	2/36	32.25	0	1	0	
10	Brett Dorey	(Australia)	6 Jan. 2006	18 Jan. 2011	20	27	14*	5.40	0	0	26	3/19	22.03	3	9	0	
11	Ben Edmondson	(Australia)	6 Jan. 2006	13 Jan. 2011	12	5	2*	5.00	0	0	18	4/14	20.61	3	0	0	
12	Luke Pomersbach	(Australia)	10 Jan. 2006	27 Jan. 2011	20	365	79	20.27	0	1	–	–	–	–	9	0	
13	Chris Rogers	(Australia)	10 Jan. 2006	10 Jan. 2006	1	16	16	16.00	0	0	–	–	–	–	0	0	
14	Beau Casson	(Australia)	10 Jan. 2006	10 Jan. 2006	1	–	–	–	–	–	0	0/16	–	0	0	0	
15	Steve Magoffin	(Australia)	10 Jan. 2006	30 Dec. 2008	5	12	11*	12.00	0	1	2	2/15	35.50	0	1	0	
16	Scott Meuleman	(Australia)	1 Jan. 2007	1 Jan. 2007	1	46	46	46.00	0	0	–	–	–	–	0	0	
17	Theo Doropoulos	(Australia)	1 Jan. 2007	10 Jan. 2010	14	197	43	21.88	0	0	1	1/22	27.00	0	12	0	
18	Sean Ervine	(Zimbabwe)	1 Jan. 2007	13 Jan. 2008	9	65	56*	16.25	0	1	3	3/18	33.66	1	6	0	
19	Darren Wates	(Australia)	1 Jan. 2007	1 Jan. 2007	1	–	–	–	–	–	0	0/23	–	0	1	0	
20	Jim Allenby	(England)	4 Jan. 2007	4 Jan. 2007	1	4	4	4.00	0	0	–	–	–	–	2	0	
21	Matt Johnston	(Australia)	4 Jan. 2007	13 Jan. 2011	4	36	17	18.00	0	0	4	2/5	11.25	0	0	0	
22	Tim MacDonald	(Australia)	4 Jan. 2007	10 Jan. 2007	3	8	8	–	0	0	3	1/18	22.00	0	0	0	
23	Aaron Heal	(Australia)	7 Jan. 2007	13 Jan. 2011	19	53	13	7.57	0	0	23	2/13	21.30	0	5	0	
24	Liam Davis	(Australia)	31 Dec. 2007	27 Jan. 2011	6	104	53	17.33	0	1	–	–	–	–	0	0	
25	Trent Kelly	(Australia)	31 Dec. 2007	31 Dec. 2007	1	–	–	–	–	–	–	–	–	–	1	0	
26	Danny McLauchlan	(Australia)	31 Dec. 2007	13 Jan. 2008	6	2	2	2.00	0	0	5	1/22	38.40	0	2	0	
27	Mathew Inness	(Australia)	4 Jan. 2008	6 Jan. 2008	2	–	–	–	–	–	4	2/22	18.50	0	0	0	
28	Michael Johnson †	(Australia)	28 Dec. 2008	30 Dec. 2008	2	11	8*	11.00	0	0	–	–	–	–	0	0	
29	Umar Gul	(Pakistan)	28 Dec. 2008	15 Jan. 2009	5	18	8	9.00	0	0	12	4/15	12.25	2	5	0	
30	Craig Simmons	(Australia)	30 Dec. 2008	15 Jan. 2009	4	71	31*	23.66	0	0	–	–	–	–	0	0	
31	Justin Coetzee	(Australia)	15 Jan. 2009	15 Jan. 2009	1	23	23*	–	0	0	–	–	–	1	0	0	
32	Chris Gayle	(Jamaica)	29 Dec. 2009	25 Jan. 2011	7	243	92	34.71	0	2	2	1/26	79.00	0	3	0	
33	Mitchell Marsh	(Australia)	29 Dec. 2009	5 Jan. 2010	3	24	21	12.00	0	0	4	4/6	1.50	1	5	0	
34	Ashley Noffke	(Australia)	29 Dec. 2009	16 Jan. 2010	4	17	13*	8.50	0	0	4	2/23	38.25	0	1	0	
35	Nathan Coulter-Nile	(Australia)	29 Dec. 2009	30 Dec. 2010	6	24	19*	24.00	0	0	4	2/44	47.75	0	3	0	
36	Brad Knowles	(Australia)	29 Dec. 2009	16 Jan. 2010	5	15	14	15.00	0	0	9	3/20	15.77	1	1	0	
37	Drew Porter	(Australia)	1 Jan. 2010	1 Jan. 2010	1	0	0	0.00	0	0	2	2/27	13.50	0	0	0	
38	Wes Robinson	(Australia)	5 Jan. 2010	16 Jan. 2010	3	139	54	46.33	0	1	–	–	–	–	1	0	
39	Michael Hogan	(Australia)	5 Jan. 2010	27 Jan. 2011	6	–	–	–	–	–	6	4/26	28.00	1	1	0	
40	Tom Beaton	(Australia)	30 Dec. 2010	27 Jan. 2011	6	67	21*	16.75	0	0	–	–	–	–	4	0	
41	Michael Swart	(Australia) (Netherlands)	30 Dec. 2010	27 Jan. 2011	2	23	18	11.50	0	0	3	3/31	14.00	1	2	0	
42	Sajid Mahmood	(England)	30 Dec. 2010	27 Jan. 2011	5	2	2	0.66	0	0	5	2/16	30.20	0	0	0	
43	Mick Lewis	(Australia)	30 Dec. 2010	27 Jan. 2011	6	18	9*	18.00	0	0	8	3/46	25.50	1	0	0	
44	Michael Beer	(Australia)	18 Jan. 2011	27 Jan. 2011	3	11	11*	–	0	0	3	1/21	26.00	0	1	0	

== See also ==
- List of Western Australia first-class cricketers
- List of Western Australia List A cricketers
