= Paul Davis (cricketer) =

Australian cricketer

Personal information
- Full name: Paul John Davis
- Born: 24 April 1981 (age 45); Subiaco, Western Australia
- Height: 1.94 m (6 ft 4 in)
- Batting: Right-handed
- Bowling: Left-arm fast-medium
- Role: Bowler

Domestic team information
- Years: Team
- 2007/08–2008/09: Western Australia

Career statistics
Competition	First-class	List A
Matches	1	5
Runs scored	39	25
Batting average	39.00	8.33
100s/50s	0/0	0/0
Top score	37	12
Balls bowled	180	240
Wickets	4	7
Bowling average	24.75	32.57
5 wickets in innings	0	0
10 wickets in match	0	0
Best bowling	3/48	3/49
Catches/stumpings	0/–	1/–
- Source: CricketArchive, 1 February 2013

Paul John Davis (born 24 April 1981) is an Australian cricketer who previously played several matches for Western Australia in domestic competitions. From Perth, Davis represented Western Australia at both under-17 and under-19 level, as well as playing grade cricket for Mount Lawley. Having previously played several matches for the state second XI, he made his limited-overs debut for Western Australia late in the 2007–08 season of the Ford Ranger Cup, against Victoria at the WACA Ground. In his second match, Davis took 3/49 to help dismiss Queensland for 111, bowling alongside Steve Magoffin and Ben Edmondson. Due to this form, he gained a full contract with the Western Australian Cricket Association (WACA) for the following season.

Davis played three further one-day matches the following season, as well as his only first-class match, a Sheffield Shield game against Queensland. In the match, played in Perth, he took four wickets and scored 37 runs in Western Australia's first innings, putting on 91 runs for the ninth wicket with Marcus North. Although not since selected at state level since January 2009, Davis continues to play grade cricket for Mount Lawley, and at the conclusion of the 2009–10 season he tied with Matthew Johnston for the Olly Cooley Medal, awarded to the best first-grade player.
