= Wally Watts =

Personal information
- Full name: Walter Watts
- Born: 17 June 1872; Adelaide, South Australia
- Died: 9 July 1946 (aged 74); Perth, Western Australia
- Original team: Midland-Swans
- Position: Utility

Playing career^{1}
Years	Club	Games (Goals)
1894	Imperials	unknown
1895 - 1896	Fremantle	unknown
unknown	Midland Junction	unknown
- ^{1} Playing statistics correct to the end of 1916.

Walter Watts (17 June 1872 – 9 July 1946) was an Australian sportsman, best known as the oldest player to have played a senior game in the West Australian Football League (WAFL).

Born in Adelaide, South Australia, in 1872, Watts initially started his football career with the Port Adelaide Football Club. In 1894 he moved to Fremantle, Western Australia, and in the 1890s, represented the Imperials Football Club, the Fremantle Football Club, and a number of Fremantle representative cricket teams which played against touring Victorian and Australian sides. Watts later moved to Midland Junction, where he worked as a blacksmith for the Midland Railway of Western Australia at the Midland Railway Workshops. He was a foundation member of the Midland First Grade cricket team (later Midland-Swan and Midland-Guildford), and was responsible for the improvement of the Midland Oval for the use of both the cricket and football team. The scoreboard at the ground is named after Watts. Watts played for the cricket club for over thirty years, and as late as the 1927–28 season, when he took a five-wicket haul against North Fremantle at the age of 55, with help from a sticky wicket.

Watts was also a noted player of Australian rules football for the Midland Junction Football Club, playing alongside several of his sons. He played his final game, against Subiaco on 5 August 1916, at the age of 44 years and 49 days, making him the oldest person to play senior football in the West Australian Football League (WAFL). He had been called out of retirement for one final game due to a player shortage at the club caused by a large number of players enlisting in the military. Watts and another "old-timer", Dick Hardie, replaced two of Watts' sons, Frederick and Albert, who were injured, in the team.

After retiring from the Railway Workshops, Watts invented and patented a number of railway track devices, including for a universal movement switch. He also represented the Midland-Guildford Cricket Club on the Western Australian Cricket Association (WACA), and served on a number of committees. Watts died on July 9, 1946, at Perth Hospital, Western Australia.

Walter Watts married Florence Louise Russell in 1892 at Hindley Street, Adelaide, South Australia. Together they had nine sons and three daughters. Five of Wally's sons played First Grade cricket, and another three played senior football. Albert Watts, the first of Wally and Florence's children to be born in Western Australia, captained Perth over four seasons, and captained Western Australia in eight matches. Two of his granddaughters later married Laurie Bandy and Ted Tyson, both noted sportsmen during the 1930s and 1940s.
