= Ken Lilly =

Australian cricketer

Personal information
- Full name: Kenneth Edward Lilly
- Born: 25 December 1959 (age 66); Perth, Western Australia
- Batting: Right-handed
- Bowling: Right-arm fast-medium
- Role: Bowler

Domestic team information
- Years: Team
- 1988/89: Western Australia

Career statistics
| Competition | First-class | List A |
|---|---|---|
| Matches | 2 | 1 |
| Runs scored | 4 | – |
| Batting average | 4.00 | – |
| 100s/50s | 0/0 | – |
| Top score | 4* | – |
| Balls bowled | 360 | 30 |
| Wickets | 6 | 1 |
| Bowling average | 42.50 | 19.00 |
| 5 wickets in innings | 0 | 0 |
| 10 wickets in match | 0 | 0 |
| Best bowling | 3/72 | 1/19 |
| Catches/stumpings | 0/– | 0/– |
- Source: CricketArchive, 17 January 2013

Kenneth Edward Lilly (born 25 December 1959) is a former Australian cricketer. From Perth, Lilly played several matches for the state colts team from the early 1980s onwards, but did not make his debut at senior level until the 1988–89 season, when he was aged 29. A right-arm fast bowler, he played two Sheffield Shield matches late in the season, as well as a single match in the limited-overs FA Insurance Cup. Lilly made his first-class debut against Victoria in January 1989 at the WACA Ground, taking 3/72 in the first innings and four wickets for the match. His second (and last) first-class match came against New South Wales the following month. He took two wickets in the match, but finished with an economy rate of 5.48 from his 21 overs, failing to bowl a maiden. Lilly's only one-day game at state level came between his two Sheffield Shield matches. He took 1/19 from five overs, helping to dismiss Tasmania for 121 runs. Lilly did not play at state level again, with Western Australia's fast-bowling stocks including several Australian internationals, notably Terry Alderman, Ken MacLeay, Chris Matthews, and Bruce Reid. However, he remained active at grade cricket level, and later coached North Perth, where he was involved in the establishment of a trophy commemorating former state player Mark McPhee.
