= Peter Henderson (cricketer) =

Australian cricketer

Personal information
- Full name: Peter Henderson
- Born: 24 April 1965; Mount Barker, Western Australia
- Died: 28 February 2010 (aged 44); Perth, Western Australia
- Batting: Left-handed
- Bowling: Right-arm medium
- Role: Bowler

Domestic team information
- Years: Team
- 1988: Western Australia

Career statistics
Competition	List A
Matches	1
Runs scored	2
Batting average	–
100s/50s	0/0
Top score	2*
Balls bowled	55
Wickets	0
Bowling average	–
5 wickets in innings	–
10 wickets in match	–
Best bowling	–
Catches/stumpings	0/–
- Source: CricketArchive, 15 December 2012

Peter Henderson (24 April 1965 – 28 February 2010) was an Australian cricketer who played a single match for Western Australia. Born in Mount Barker, Western Australia, Henderson represented Western Australia at under-19s level, and later attended the Western Australian Institute of Sport. His sole match at state level came during the 1987–88 McDonald's Cup, a limited-overs knockout competition.

In the match, played at the WACA Ground in March 1988, Henderson was part of a pace attack that included Terry Alderman, Ken MacLeay, and Chris Matthews, but failed to take a wicket, recording figures of 0/50 from 9.1 overs. At grade cricket level, Henderson played 15 seasons for the Scarborough and South Perth Cricket Clubs, captaining and winning club champion awards at both clubs. Bowling right-arm medium pace, he led Scarborough's wicket-taking for the 1987–88 season, taking 60 wickets.

Henderson died in February 2010, with his name commemorated in the Peter Henderson Memorial Trophy, which is contested between Scarborough and South Perth.
