= Geoff Millar =

Australian cricketer (born 1955)

Personal information
- Full name: Geoffrey Alan Millar
- Born: 22 November 1955 (age 70); Subiaco, Western Australia
- Batting: Right-handed
- Bowling: Right-arm medium
- Role: Bowling all-rounder

Domestic team information
- Years: Team
- 1981/82–1982/83: Western Australia

Career statistics
Competition	First-class	List A
Matches	1	3
Runs scored	20	31
Batting average	20.00	15.50
100s/50s	0/0	0/0
Top score	20	30
Balls bowled	114	144
Wickets	0	4
Bowling average	–	24.25
5 wickets in innings	–	0
10 wickets in match	–	0
Best bowling	–	2/17
Catches/stumpings	0/–	2/–
- Source: CricketArchive, 14 December 2012

Geoffrey Alan Millar (born 22 November 1955) is a former Australian cricketer who played several matches for Western Australia during the early 1980s. From Perth, Millar played at colts level during the late 1970s, generally as an all-rounder. He made his Sheffield Shield debut for Western Australia during the 1981–82 competition, and failed to take a wicket in what was to be his only first-class match. In the match, against Queensland at the WACA Ground in February 1982, he was part of a pace attack that included David Boyd (who he opened the bowling with in the first innings), Mick Malone, and Ken MacLeay. Millar also appeared at List A level several times for Western Australia. In his first match, the third-place playoff of the 1981–82 McDonald's Cup, he took 2/17 and scored 30 runs, and was thus named man of the match. His two further matches both occurred in the following year's tournament. At grade cricket level, Millar played 177 matches for the Mount Lawley District Cricket Club.
