= Laurie Bandy =

Australian cricketer

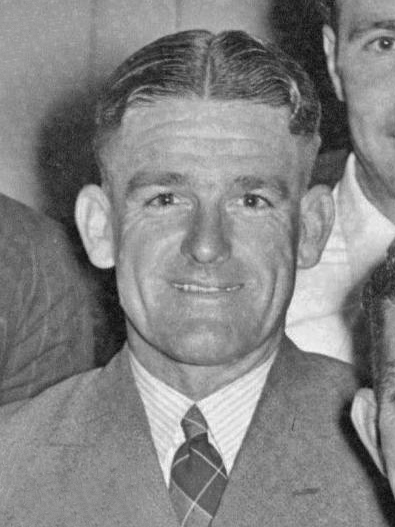
- Bandy in 1948

Personal information
- Full name: Lawrence Henry Bandy
- Born: 3 September 1911; Perth, Western Australia
- Died: 18 July 1984 (aged 72); Scarborough, Western Australia
- Batting: Right-handed
- Bowling: Right-arm leg break
- Role: Batsman

Domestic team information
- Years: Team
- 1939/40–1947/48: Western Australia

Career statistics
Competition	First-class
Matches	7
Runs scored	270
Batting average	27.00
100s/50s	0/1
Top score	53*
Balls bowled	264
Wickets	3
Bowling average	36.33
5 wickets in innings	0
10 wickets in match	0
Best bowling	2/16
Catches/stumpings	6/–
- Source: CricketArchive, 15 January 2012

Lawrence Henry Bandy (3 September 1911 – 18 July 1984) was an Australian cricketer who represented Western Australia in seven first-class matches between 1940 and 1948. Born in Perth, Bandy débuted for Western Australia Colts in 1935, scoring a duck against New South Wales. He made his first-class debut four-and-a-half years later, in February 1940, playing two matches against a touring South Australian team. For a time during the mid-1940s, Bandy was considered Western Australia's premier batsman. However, WA was not yet admitted into the Sheffield Shield competition, so Bandy was restricted to playing touring teams. Western Australia was admitted into the Shield for the 1947–48 season, albeit on a limited basis. Bandy played three matches in the first season, which included a score of 53 not out, his highest score and only first-class half-century.

Bandy did not play any further first-class matches. At grade cricket level, he holds several records for the Joondalup Cricket Club (previously the North Perth Cricket Club), including the most appearances (273 between the 1930–31 and 1951–52 seasons), and most career runs (8,267). Overall, Bandy played 309 grade cricket matches, the fourth-most of all-time, scoring 9,458 runs, the equal fourth-most of all-time. He later married a granddaughter of Wally Watts, a noted sportsman who represented Midland-Guildford on the committee of the Western Australian Cricket Association (WACA), and was also a brother-in-law of the Australian rules footballer Ted Tyson. Bandy died at his home in Scarborough in 1984.
