= Phil O'Meara =

Australian cricketer (born 1951)

Personal information
- Full name: Phillip Anthony O'Meara
- Born: 13 June 1951 (age 75); Kellerberrin, Western Australia
- Batting: Right-handed
- Role: Batsman

Domestic team information
- Years: Team
- 1977/78: Western Australia

Career statistics
Competition	First-class
Matches	1
Runs scored	29
Batting average	14.50
100s/50s	0/0
Top score	20
Catches/stumpings	2/–
- Source: CricketArchive, 20 September 2011

Phillip Anthony O'Meara (born 13 June 1951) is an Australian former cricketer. He played one first-class match for Western Australia in the 1978 Sheffield Shield against Queensland at the Gabba, making 9 runs in the first innings and 20 runs in the second. O'Meara also played grade cricket for the Fremantle District Cricket Club in the Western Australian Grade Cricket competition. He holds the record for the most runs made in a season for the club: 834 runs in the 1978–79 season. He is the current vice-president of the Victorian Sub-District Cricket Association.
