= Matthew Petrie =

Australian cricketer

Personal information
- Full name: Matthew John Petrie
- Born: 27 October 1978 (age 48); South Brisbane, Queensland, Australia
- Batting: Right-handed
- Bowling: Right-arm fast-medium
- Role: Bowler

Domestic team information
- Years: Team
- 2006: Western Australia

Career statistics
Competition	FC	LA
Matches	1	3
Runs scored	4	n/a
Batting average	4.00	n/a
100s/50s	0/0	n/a
Top score	4*	n/a
Balls bowled	210	132
Wickets	1	2
Bowling average	88.00	56.50
5 wickets in innings	0	0
10 wickets in match	0	n/a
Best bowling	1/59	1/34
Catches/stumpings	0/-	0/-
- Source: CricketArchive, 31 January 2013

Matthew John Petrie (born 27 October 1978) is a former Australian cricketer who played several matches for Western Australia during the 2005–06 season. From Brisbane, Petrie spent his early career in Queensland, representing the state at under-19 and colts level, as well as later attending the Queensland Academy of Sport. A right-arm fast bowler, he moved to Western Australia prior to the 2004–05 season, and during the season represented a state representative side against the touring Pakistanis, although the match was not accorded first-class status. Also playing for Willetton in the WACA district competition, Petrie led the competition's bowling averages, which led to occasional selection in the state second XI team playing in the Cricket Australia Cup.

Petrie again played against a touring side the following season, taking 4/78 against the touring South Africans in December 2005. This form led to his selection the following month to play for Western Australia in a limited-overs ING Cup against Queensland, held at the WACA Ground. Petrie went on to play in two further ING Cup matches, taking two wickets, and a single Pura Cup match, taking one wicket. With Western Australia's fast-bowling attack including established players Brett Dorey, Ben Edmondson, and Steve Magoffin, he did not play at state level again, and later returned to Queensland.
