= Mark P. Atkinson =

Australian cricketer

Mark Atkinson
Personal information
- Full name: Mark Peter Atkinson
- Born: 27 November 1970 (age 55); Bentley, Western Australia, Australia
- Nickname: Rowan
- Height: 180 cm (5 ft 11 in)
- Batting: Right-handed
- Bowling: Right-arm fast-medium
- Role: Bowling all rounder

Domestic team information
- Years: Team
- 1992/3–2000/01: Western Australia

Career statistics
Competition	First-class	List A
Matches	21	30
Runs scored	423	136
Batting average	21.15	9.06
100s/50s	0/1	0/0
Top score	52*	31
Balls bowled	3,502	1,535
Wickets	54	39
Bowling average	35.61	29.53
5 wickets in innings	1	0
10 wickets in match	0	0
Best bowling	5/92	4/38
Catches/stumpings	13/–	10/–
- Source: ESPNCricinfo, 21 June 2011

Mark Peter Atkinson (born 27 November 1970) is an Australian former professional cricketer, who played for Western Australia between 1992 and 2001.

== Early career ==
Atkinson was born in Bentley, Western Australia, in 1970. He represented the WAIS Colts and Australian Cricket Academy sides. Atkinson played grade cricket for Perth Cricket Club, winning consecutive Olly Cooley Medals for the best player in the Western Australian Grade Cricket competition in 1995–96 and 1996–97.

== Playing career ==
=== Western Australia career ===
Atkinson made his debut for Western Australia in 1992. In total he played 21 first-class matches, taking 54 wickets at an average of 35.61 with a best of 5/92, and 31 List A matches, taking 39 wickets at an average of 29.53, with a best of 4/38.

=== English career ===
Atkinson also played cricket in England, including two matches for the Surrey Second XI in 1997, taking two wickets, and 24 matches for Church in the Lancashire League as the team's professional in 1994. He was both the team's leading run-scorer and second-highest wicket-taker, scoring 809 runs at an average of 44.94 with a best of 122 not out, and taking 46 wickets at an average of 25.63, with a best of 8/61.
