= Jeremy Allen =

Australian cricketer (born 1971)

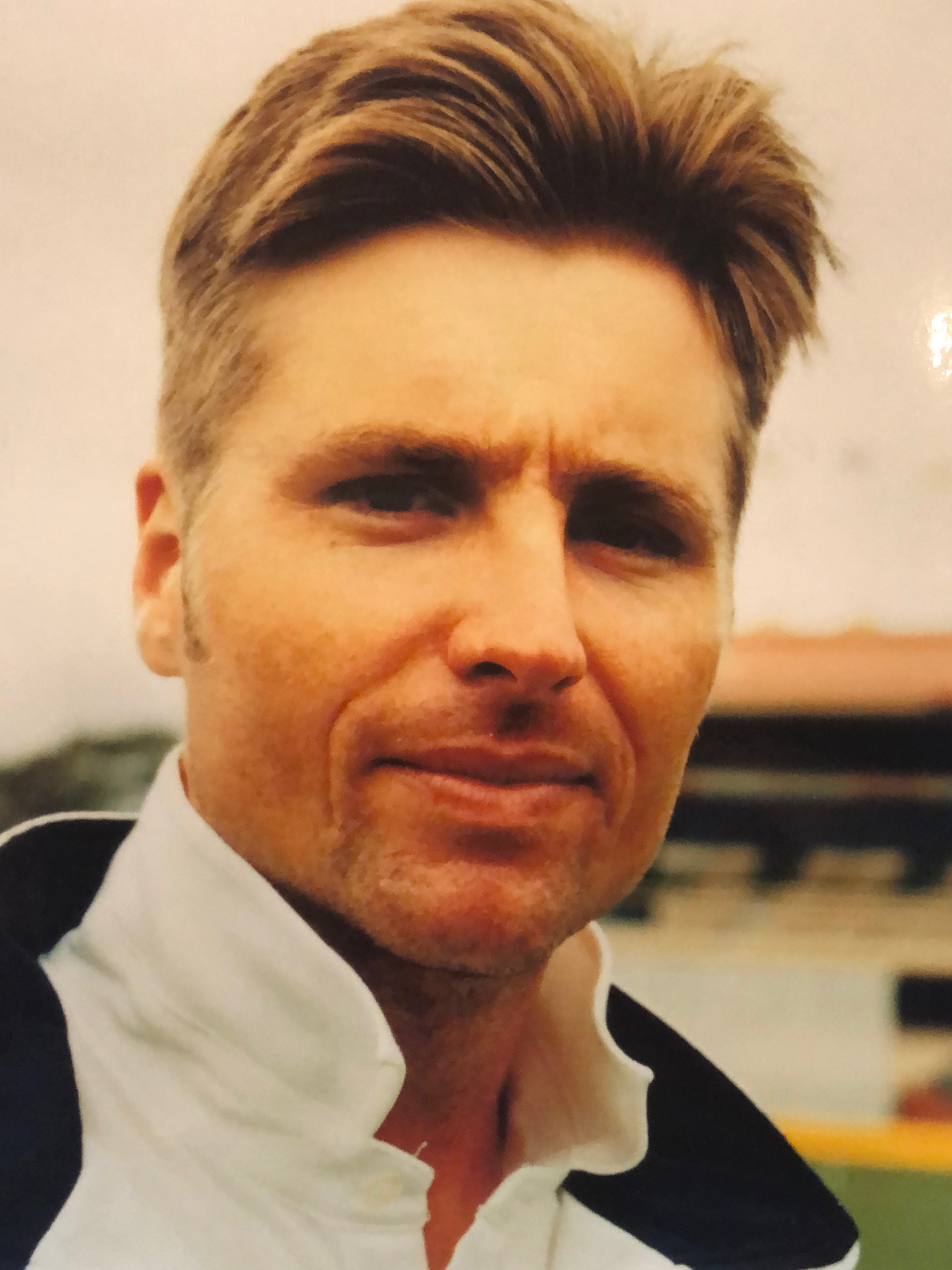

Personal information
- Full name: Jeremy Michael Allen
- Born: 11 June 1971 (age 55); Subiaco, Western Australia
- Height: 6 ft 3 in (1.91 m)
- Batting: Right-handed
- Bowling: Left-arm fast-medium
- Role: Bowler

Domestic team information
- Years: Team
- 1994/95–1996/97: Western Australia

Career statistics
Competition	First-class	List A
Matches	1	1
Runs scored	30	12
Batting average	30.00	–
100s/50s	0/0	0/0
Top score	30	12*
Balls bowled	120	60
Wickets	0	3
Bowling average	–	20.66
5 wickets in innings	–	0
10 wickets in match	–	0
Best bowling	–	3/62
Catches/stumpings	0/–	0/–
- Source: CricketArchive, 1 February 2013

Jeremy Michael Allen (born 11 June 1971) is a former Australian cricketer. From Perth, Allen represented Western Australia at both under-17 and under-19 level, and played grade cricket for Subiaco–Floreat. A regular player for the state second XI from the early 1990s, he did not make his senior debut until the 1994–95 season, playing a Mercantile Mutual Cup match against Queensland. On debut at the WACA Ground, he took 3/62 from his ten overs to help Western Australia win by a single run. Despite this performance, Allen did not play any further limited-overs matches for Western Australia, with the state fast-bowling attack including established players Sean Cary, Craig Coulson, and Brendan Julian. His only other match at state level came during the 1996–97 season of the Sheffield Shield. In what was to be his only first-class match, he failed to take a wicket against Tasmania, but did score 30 runs batting tenth in Western Australia's second innings. Although he attended the Australian Cricket Academy in 1996, Allen spent the rest of his career in minor competitions.
