= Wayne Hill =

Australian cricketer

Personal information
- Full name: Wayne Douglas Hill
- Born: 5 December 1953 (age 72); Subiaco, Western Australia
- Batting: Right-handed
- Role: Wicket-keeper

Domestic team information
- Years: Team
- 1983/84–1984/85: Western Australia

Career statistics
Competition	First-class	List A
Matches	8	1
Runs scored	83	–
Batting average	10.37	–
100s/50s	0/0	–
Top score	31*	–
Balls bowled	6	–
Wickets	0	–
Bowling average	–	–
5 wickets in innings	–	–
10 wickets in match	–	–
Best bowling	–	–
Catches/stumpings	23/0	1/0
- Source: CricketArchive, 15 December 2012

Wayne Douglas Hill (born 5 December 1953) is a former Australian cricketer who played several matches as a wicket-keeper for Western Australia, and later served in a number of positions with the Western Australian Cricket Association (WACA). From Perth, Hill made his first-class debut for Western Australia during the 1983–84 Sheffield Shield, playing four matches during the competition when Rod Marsh was unavailable due to selection for the national team. He scored 31 not out in Western Australia's first innings, in what was to be his highest first-class score. Marsh retired at the end of the season, and Hill played in Western Australia's first three Sheffield Shield matches, as well as a tour match against the West Indies and a match in the limited-overs McDonald's Cup. However, he was subsequently replaced by Tim Zoehrer as wicket-keeper in both competitions, and did not play at state level again. Hill continued to play at grade cricket level for the Perth Cricket Club, retiring after the 1987–88 season with 162 matches and a club-record 323 dismissals (264 catches and 59 stumpings). From 1995, he served on the selection panel for Western Australia, and was appointed chairman of selectors in April 2002. Hill retired from the panel at the conclusion of the 2006–07 season, and was replaced by Tom Hogan as chairman.
