= Scarborough Cricket Club =

Scarborough Cricket Club may refer to

- Scarborough Cricket Club (Australia), Western Australia
- Scarborough Cricket Club (England), North Yorkshire
