= Merv Inverarity =

Australian cricketer

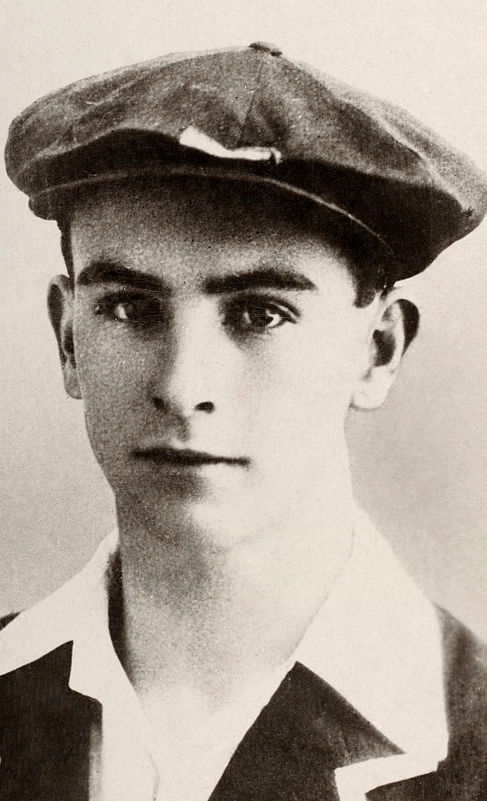

Personal information
- Full name: Mervyn Inverarity
- Born: 25 October 1907; Claremont, Western Australia
- Died: 17 March 1979 (aged 71); Cottesloe, Western Australia
- Batting: Right-handed
- Bowling: Right-arm medium Right-arm leg break
- Role: All-rounder
- Relatives: John Inverarity (son); Alison Inverarity (granddaughter)

Domestic team information
- Years: Team
- 1925/26–1939/40: Western Australia

Career statistics
| Competition | First-class |
|---|---|
| Matches | 26 |
| Runs scored | 736 |
| Batting average | 17.11 |
| 100s/50s | 0/4 |
| Top score | 68* |
| Balls bowled | 3,099 |
| Wickets | 53 |
| Bowling average | 39.69 |
| 5 wickets in innings | 3 |
| 10 wickets in match | 0 |
| Best bowling | 6/162 |
| Catches/stumpings | 12/– |
- Source: CricketArchive, 27 July 2011

Mervyn Inverarity (25 October 1907 – 17 March 1979) was an Australian cricketer who played 26 first-class matches for Western Australia between 1925 and 1940.

Inverarity attended Scotch College, Perth, in the 1920s, also playing for Western Australia Colts during the same period. He made his first-class debut for Western Australia against South Australia in October 1925, recording innings figures of 6/179 on debut.

An all-rounder, Inverarity scored 736 runs during his career, at an average of 17.11, with a highest score of 68*. He also took 53 wickets at an average of 39.69, with a best bowling of 6/162. Inverarity captained Western Australia in two matches in the 1939–40 season. He also captained Fremantle District Cricket Club in the Western Australian Grade Cricket competition, and holds the all-time career runs aggregate record for the club, with 6133 runs. His son John Inverarity played Test cricket for Australia.
