= Graham Ramshaw =

Australian rules footballer

Personal information
- Born: 7 August 1945; North Fremantle, Western Australia
- Died: 15 September 2006 (aged 61); North Beach, Western Australia
- Original team: Perth (WANFL)
- Debut: Round 12, 1965, Fitzroy vs. Collingwood, at Brunswick St
- Height: 185 cm (6 ft 1 in)
- Weight: 78 kg (172 lb)

Playing career^{1}
Years	Club	Games (Goals)
1962-1963 & 1965-1973	Perth	175 (127)
1964	Fitzroy	6 (4)
1974-1975	Central District	3 (0)
Total		184 (131)
- ^{1} Playing statistics correct to the end of 1975.

Graham Joseph Ramshaw (7 August 1945 – 15 September 2006) was a leading Australian rules footballer, playing for Perth Football Club in the Western Australian Football League (WAFL), Fitzroy Football Club in the Victorian Football League (VFL) and Central District in the South Australian National Football League (SANFL).

== Early years ==
Born in North Fremantle, Western Australia to a long-serving Perth committee member, Ramshaw was a student at Manning Primary School and Applecross High School, and was a star junior footballer, being awarded the best player of the national State schoolboys' football carnival in Brisbane in 1959.

== Career ==
Ramshaw made his senior debut for Perth aged 17 in 1963 as a full forward and impressed to the extent that VFL club Fitzroy sought to recruit him for the 1964 VFL season. Perth were reluctant to clear him but, after threats from Ramshaw to step down from football, cleared him to Fitzroy just prior to the 30 June clearance deadline and Ramshaw played six games and kicked four goals for Fitzroy before returning to Perth for the 1965 season.

Ramshaw was a premiership player with Perth in 1966, 1967 and 1968, the first as a full forward while the latter two as a full back. Ramshaw was awarded life membership of Perth in 1972 and finished with 178 games for Perth.

In 1974 Ramshaw transferred to SANFL club Central District, where he spent two injury riddled years, playing just three games for no goals. Following his retirement from football, Ramshaw returned to Western Australia and worked in the concrete and waste management industries.

== Death ==
Ramshaw died from cancer in North Beach, Western Australia, aged 61. He was survived by his wife Kaye, three sons and seven grandchildren. One son, Darrin Ramshaw, played cricket for Western Australia and Victoria and football for Perth, while another, Troy, played three games for Perth.
