= Ryan Campbell =

Australian cricketer (born 1972)

Personal information
- Full name: Ryan John Campbell
- Born: 7 February 1972 (age 54); Perth, Western Australia
- Nickname: Cambo
- Batting: Right-handed
- Bowling: Right-arm off spin
- Role: Wicket-keeper
- Relatives: Tom Lammonby (cousin)

International information
- National sides: Australia (2002); Hong Kong (2016)
- ODI debut (cap 146): 17 January 2002; Australia v New Zealand
- Last ODI: 22 December 2002; Australia v Sri Lanka
- T20I debut (cap 21): 8 March 2016; Hong Kong v Zimbabwe
- Last T20I: 12 March 2016; Hong Kong v Scotland

Domestic team information
- Years: Team
- 1995/96–2005/06: Western Australia
- 2012: Ahmedabad Rockets (ICL)
- 2016: Kowloon Cantons (T20 Blitz)

Head coaching information
- Years: Team
- 2017–2022: Netherlands
- 2023–present: Durham

Career statistics
Competition	ODI	T20I	FC	LA
Matches	2	3	98	105
Runs scored	54	36	6,009	2,286
Batting average	27.00	12.00	36.41	23.56
100s/50s	0/0	0/0	11/37	1/10
Top score	38	29	203	108
Balls bowled	–	60	24	–
Wickets	–	2	0	–
Bowling average	–	34.00	–	–
5 wickets in innings	–	0	–	–
10 wickets in match	–	0	–	–
Best bowling	–	2/28	–	–
Catches/stumpings	4/1	1/–	267/15	139/11
- Source: CricketArchive, 12 March 2016

Ryan John Campbell (born 7 February 1972) is an Australian former cricketer who represented both Australia and Hong Kong internationally. He is the current head coach of Durham, on a contract covering the 2023 to 2025 seasons.

Campbell was born in Perth. He made his debut for Western Australia during the 1995–96 season, and initially played as a specialist batsman, with Adam Gilchrist keeping wicket. He later replaced Gilchrist as wicket-keeper following the latter's elevation to the national team in the late 1990s. Having first played for Australia A during the 1997–98 season, Campbell made his ODI debut in January 2002, against New Zealand. His only other appearance at that level came in December of the same year, against Sri Lanka. He was substituting for Gilchrist on both occasions. Campbell made his last appearances for Western Australia during the 2005–06 season, subsequently being replaced by Luke Ronchi.

After the conclusion of his domestic career in Australia, Campbell began working in the media, as a sports presenter on radio and cricket commentator on television. In 2008, he played a single season with the Ahmedabad Rockets, a franchise in the unsanctioned Indian Cricket League (ICL). Campbell moved to Hong Kong in 2012, to play for and coach the Kowloon Cricket Club. In 2016, aged 43, he was included in the Hong Kong national team's squad for the 2016 World Twenty20 in India. He made his Twenty20 International (T20I) debut for Hong Kong against Zimbabwe in the 2016 World Twenty20 on 8 March 2016, scoring 9 runs as an opener. At the age of 44 years and 30 days, he became the oldest player to debut in a T20I match.

== Personal life ==
Campbell was born in Osborne Park, a suburb of Perth, Western Australia, and played WACA grade cricket for Bayswater-Morley, Scarborough, and Joondalup. He has Hong Kong Chinese ancestry through his grandmother, with one of his great-grandfathers being born in Kowloon. Campbell's wife and son were also born in Hong Kong. His brother in law is Andrew Heffernan, who competed in the equestrian events at the 2012 Summer Olympics. Campbell suffered from depression during his playing career, and in 2001 contemplated retiring early to focus on his health, eventually deciding to continue playing. He is a supporter of Beyond Blue, an Australian mental health advocacy group.

== Playing career ==
=== Australia ===
Campbell was inducted into the Australian Cricket Academy in 1994, and made his first-class debut for an academy team in April 1995, playing against the New Zealand Cricket Academy. His debut for Western Australia came in February 1996, during the 1995–96 season of the Mercantile Mutual Cup (the national one-day competition). Campbell initially played as a specialist batsman, with Adam Gilchrist serving as wicket-keeper. He did keep wicket on his Sheffield Shield debut (against Tasmania in November 1996), which came in Gilchrist's absence, but spent the remainder of the season as an opening batsman, partnering with Mike Hussey. Campbell was one of only three WA players to appear in every Sheffield Shield match during the 1996–97 season, and finished with 672 runs, behind only Mike Hussey and Justin Langer amongst his teammates. Against Victoria, he scored a maiden first-class century, making 113 runs from 106 balls. He brought up his century in only 86 balls, making it the fastest hundred of the season.

During the 1997–98 Sheffield Shield season, Campbell was again among the leading batsmen for WA, scoring 726 runs from eleven matches. He scored three centuries during the season, including 177 against New South Wales, and also kept wicket in four games while Adam Gilchrist was on national duty. In August 1998, Campbell was selected for Australia A for the first time, touring Ireland and Scotland with the team. Later in 1998, he also played for Australia A in a one-off day-night game against the senior Australian team, opening the batting with Michael Slater. Campbell made further appearances for Australia A the following year, all in the one-day format, appearing in three games against the touring Sri Lankans and a five-game series against India A, which was played at the Woodley Cricket Field in Los Angeles.

Campbell made career-best scores in both the first-class and one-day formats during the 1999–00 season, both of which came against Queensland. He made 203 from 222 balls in a Pura Milk Cup fixture at the WACA Ground, helping WA win by an innings and 257 runs, and later scored 108 runs from 85 balls in the final of the Mercantile Mutual Cup. Campbell finished the 1999–00 Pura Milk Cup with 885 runs from ten matches, which was the most for WA and behind only Matthew Elliott and Darren Lehmann overall. However, his output was much reduced the following season, as he struggled with a knee injury that eventually required surgery.

In January 2002, Campbell was selected to play for Australia in an ODI against New Zealand, after Adam Gilchrist withdrew from the team to spend time with his newborn son. He stumped Mark Richardson off the bowling of Shane Warne in New Zealand's innings, and later scored 38 runs from 52 balls opening the batting with Mark Waugh, eventually being dismissed by Daniel Vettori. Campbell made his second and final ODI appearance for Australia in December of the same year, against Sri Lanka. He again came into the team as a replacement for Gilchrist, who was suffering from groin and knee injuries. He batted lower in the order, at number six, and made 16 runs from 18 balls.

Campbell had been named in Australia's initial 30-man squad for the 2003 World Cup in South Africa, but did not make the final cut. He was one of four wicket-keepers in the initial squad, alongside Gilchrist, Brad Haddin, and Jimmy Maher, with Gilchrist and Maher eventually being selected for the World Cup. Campbell played his last matches for Australia A in April 2003, against South Africa A, and remained Western Australia's primary wicket-keeper until his retirement in January 2006, midway through the 2005–06 season.

=== India ===
In September 2008, Campbell signed with the Ahmedabad Rockets franchise for the second season of the Indian Cricket League (ICL), a BCCI-unsanctioned predecessor to the Indian Premier League (IPL). In his third game of the tournament, against the Mumbai Champs, he scored 92 not out from just 51 balls, and was named man of the match. Two games later, against the Royal Bengal Tigers, he scored another half-century, 66 not out from 35 balls. Campbell finished the season with 237 runs from eight appearances, which was behind only Murray Goodwin for his team. His strike rate of 160.13 was behind only Imran Nazir among players scoring 200 runs or more.

=== Hong Kong ===
Campbell first played in Hong Kong as early as 1997, when he represented Australia at the Hong Kong Sixes. In January 2016, after meeting the residency qualifications for Hong Kong, he was named in the national squad for the 2016 World Twenty20 in India. Aged 44, the oldest player at the tournament, Campbell played in all three of his team's matches (against Zimbabwe, Afghanistan, and Scotland), scoring 36 runs and taking two wickets. His best performance came against Afghanistan, where he scored 27 runs from 24 balls and took 2/28 from four overs.

== Coaching career ==
Campbell spent time as an advisor to the Hong Kong national team in 2010, helping the side prepare for the cricket tournament at the 2010 Asian Games. He moved to Hong Kong permanently in April 2012, taking up a position as a player-coach at the Kowloon Cricket Club. In May 2013, he was also appointed as the Hong Kong national team's specialist batting coach.

In January 2017, Campbell was appointed head coach of the Dutch national team. He took over from Chris Adams (the interim head coach) in April 2017. Both his wife and son are Dutch citizens.

In April 2022, while in the UK, Campbell suffered a cardiac arrest, and was in intensive care in a coma. He was discharged from Royal Stoke University Hospital three weeks later.

In October–November 2022, Campbell supervised Netherlands' highly praised campaign at the Men's T20 World Cup; after progressing to the Super 12, they defeated South Africa to secure automatic qualification for the next T20 World Cup in 2024.

In December 2022, Campbell was appointed head coach of Durham on a three-year contract to the end of the 2025 season, succeeding James Franklin.

== Media career ==
In 2007, Campbell joined Nova 93.7 as the sport reporter on the breakfast show with Nathan and Nat, replacing Tim Gossage. He has also commentated Ford Ranger One Day Cup matches for Fox Sports, and provided commentary for Network Ten's coverage of the Indian Premier League.
