= Barry Thornton (cricketer) =

Australian cricketer (born 1941)

Personal information
- Full name: Barry Thomas Thornton
- Born: 3 June 1941 (age 85); South Perth, Western Australia
- Batting: Right-handed
- Bowling: Right-arm fast-medium
- Role: Bowling all-rounder

Domestic team information
- Years: Team
- 1971/72: Western Australia

Career statistics
Competition	First-class	LA
Matches	1	1
Runs scored	24	–
Batting average	–	–
100s/50s	0/0	–
Top score	16*	–
Balls bowled	128	64
Wickets	1	0
Bowling average	87.00	–
5 wickets in innings	0	–
10 wickets in match	0	–
Best bowling	1/47	–
Catches/stumpings	0/–	0/–
- Source: CricketArchive, 15 December 2012

Barry Thomas Thornton (born 3 June 1941) is a former Australian cricketer who played twice for Western Australia during the 1971–72 season. From Perth, Thornton debuted at state level in a limited-overs match against New South Wales in November 1971, during the quarter-final of the Coca-Cola Knockout Cup. Part of a pace attack that included Sam Gannon, Bob Massie, and Graeme Watson, he failed to take a wicket from his eight overs, finishing with figures of 0/44. Thornton's only first-class match came the following week against the touring Rest of the World XI. Bowling first change to Gannon and Massie, he dismissed Hylton Ackerman for 50 runs in the World XI's first innings, and was also involved in the run out of Zaheer Abbas. Thornton did not take a wicket in the World XI's second innings, although he scored 24 runs in the match without being dismissed, including his highest first-class score of 16*.
