= Mark Palmer (cricketer) =

Australian cricketer (born 1967)

Personal information
- Full name: Mark Brendon Palmer
- Born: 10 February 1967 (age 59); Subiaco, Western Australia
- Nickname: uncle mark
- Batting: Right-handed
- Role: Wicket-keeper

Domestic team information
- Years: Team
- 1989/90: Western Australia

Career statistics
Competition	List A
Matches	1
Runs scored	0
Batting average	0.00
100s/50s	0/0
Top score	0
Catches/stumpings	2/–
- Source: CricketArchive, 5 January 2013

Mark Brendon Palmer (born 10 February 1967) is a former Australian cricketer who played a single List A match for Western Australia during the 1989–90 season. From Perth, Palmer played at state under-16 and under-19 level, and played several matches as wicket-keeper for the Australian under-19 cricket team during both the 1985–86 and 1986–87 seasons. He went on to attend the Western Australian Institute of Sport (WAIS), participating in its cricket program. Having previously played for the state colts team, Palmer's sole match at senior state level came against Sri Lanka, during its 1989–90 tour of Australia. The match, played at the end of Sri Lanka's tour, was the first of a two-part series, with both matches held at the WACA Ground in early February 1990. Western Australia trialled several new players in both matches, with Palmer one of four List A debutants in the match, alongside Brendan Julian, Chris Mack, and Darrin Ramshaw. Replacing usual state wicket-keeper Tim Zoehrer, Palmer was bowled by Rumesh Ratnayake for a golden duck, but took two catches in Sri Lanka's innings, off the bowling of Peter Capes and Steve Russell. He did not play at state level again.
