= Clint Heron =

Zimbabwean cricketer (born 1979)

Personal information
- Full name: Clint Jack Heron
- Born: 3 April 1979 (age 47); Salisbury, Rhodesia
- Height: 1.79 m (5 ft 10 in)
- Batting: Right-handed
- Bowling: Right-arm off break
- Relatives: Jack Heron (father)

Domestic team information
- Years: Team
- 2005/06–2006/07: Western Australia

Career statistics
Competition	First-class
Matches	6
Runs scored	307
Batting average	27.90
100s/50s	–/4
Top score	84
Balls bowled	–
Wickets	–
Bowling average	–
5 wickets in innings	–
10 wickets in match	–
Best bowling	–
Catches/stumpings	6/–
- Source: Cricinfo, 22 September 2012

Clint Jack Heron (born 3 April 1979 in Salisbury, Rhodesia) is a Zimbabwean cricketer, who played for Western Warriors. Heron, nicknamed Torus, is a right-handed batsman and bowls right arm off-break. On his first-class debut in November 2005 he scored 84 against Tasmania, this remains his highest score in first-class cricket. His father, Jack, played ODIs for Zimbabwe. He also played for the two Scarborough Cricket Club's, in both Northern & Southern Hemispheres.
