= Danny McLauchlan =

Australian cricketer

Personal information
- Full name: Daniel James McLauchlan
- Born: 17 December 1977 (age 48); Sydney, New South Wales, Australia
- Batting: Right-handed
- Bowling: Left-arm fast bowling
- Role: Bowler

Domestic team information
- Years: Team
- 2007–2008: Western Australia

Career statistics
Competition	FC	List A	T20
Matches	2	6	6
Runs scored	25	22	2
Batting average	12.50	7.33	2
100s/50s	0/0	0/0	0/0
Top score	20*	18	2
Balls bowled	402	336	138
Wickets	8	6	5
Bowling average	22.00	50.00	38.40
5 wickets in innings	0	0	0
10 wickets in match	0	0	0
Best bowling	4/76	4/50	1/22
Catches/stumpings	0/-	2/-	2/-
- Source: ESPN Cricinfo, 12 January 2015

Daniel James 'Danny' McLauchlan (born 12 December 1977) is an Australian cricketer.

Originally from Sydney, New South Wales, McLauchlan was a member of the Australia Under-19 cricket team that toured Pakistan in March 1997 and played in two Under-19 Tests and an Under-19 One Day International. He moved to Western Australia and was selected to play in the final two 2006–07 Pura Cup season, taking 4 wickets for 76 runs in his first-class cricket debut.

McLauchlan was contracted with Western Australia for the 2007/08 season, after his impressive debut performance and performing well for Western Australian Grade Cricket team Scarborough Cricket Club throughout the previous summer.

He played a number of List A and Twenty20 games for Western Australia during the 2007/08 season, but was not offered a contract for 2008/09.

Returning to Sydney, he continued to play cricket in the Sydney Cricket Association, but has (at the end of season 2014/15) been suspended a record ten times for a wide range of Code of Conduct breaches mostly involving crude and/or offensive verbal attacks on opposing players and umpires. At the end of the 2014/15 season McLaughlan moved away from Sydney Grade Cricket taking up a role playing in the First Grade competition in Newcastle. Within only a few games of that season's start he was once again in hot water with match officials being cited for a range of abuse of umpire issues.
