= Peter Worthington (cricketer) =

Australian cricketer (born 1979)

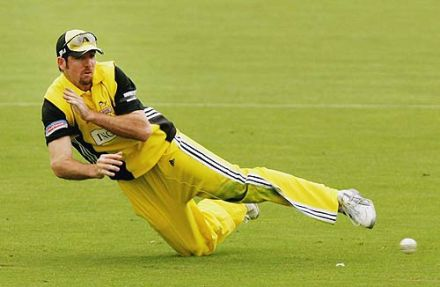
- Worthington making a diving stop

Personal information
- Full name: Peter Colin Worthington
- Born: 12 July 1979 (age 47); Middle Swan, Western Australia
- Height: 1.83 m (6 ft 0 in)
- Batting: Right-handed
- Bowling: Right-arm medium
- Role: All-rounder

Domestic team information
- Years: Team
- 2002/03-2006/07: Western Australia

Peter Colin Worthington (born 12 July 1979) is an Australian cricketer who played domestic cricket for Western Australia from the 2000–01 to 2006–07 seasons.

An all-rounder, he attended the Australian Cricket Academy in 2003. He played in seven first-class cricket matches for the Western Warriors – one in 2002–03, five in 2003–04 and one in 2004–05. His best bowling of 6/59 – his only 5-wicket haul at senior level – came in Western Australia's first Pura Cup match of 2003–04. With three wickets in South Australia's first innings and 50 runs with the bat in a losing run chase, this was easily his best first-class performance, and the only occasion on which he was man of the match. His performances subsequently faded, and he fell out of contention for a place in the state side, but he hit 73* – his second first-class half-century, and his highest batting score at senior level – in his last first-class match, against New South Wales.

He continued to play one-day cricket and Twenty20 cricket for Western Australia until 2006. In all, he played in 26 List A matches and five T20 matches. He made two List A half-centuries, in addition to two in first-class cricket. He played in the final of the ING Cup in 2002–03 that Western Australia lost to New South Wales, only one ING Cup match in 2003–4, but then all 10 of the ING Cup matches played by Western Australia in 2005–06.

He has played for Mildenhall in the East Anglian Premier Cricket League for several seasons starting in 2005.

== See also ==
- List of Western Australia first-class cricketers
- List of Western Australia List A cricketers
- List of Western Australia Twenty20 cricketers
