= Michael Thistle =

Australian cricketer

Personal information
- Full name: Michael James Thistle
- Born: 5 August 1980 (age 46); Perth, Western Australia
- Batting: Right-handed
- Bowling: Right-arm fast-medium
- Role: Bowler

Domestic team information
- Years: Team
- 2003/04: Western Australia

Career statistics
Competition	First-class	List A
Matches	1	2
Runs scored	14	–
Batting average	7.00	–
100s/50s	0/0	–
Top score	14	–
Balls bowled	132	–
Wickets	0	4
Bowling average	–	21.50
5 wickets in innings	–	0
10 wickets in match	–	0
Best bowling	–	3/32
Catches/stumpings	0/–	0/–
- Source: CricketArchive, 1 February 2013

Michael James Thistle (born 5 August 1980) is an Australian cricketer who previously played several matches for Western Australia in domestic competitions.

== Career ==
From Perth, Thistle first played for the state second XI during the 2000–01 season, and later attended the Australian Cricket Academy. A right-arm fast bowler, he did not make his debut at state level until the 2003–04 season, when he played two limited-overs matches in the ING Cup and a single first-class in the Pura Cup. On his one-day debut, he took 3/32, including the wicket of John Davison with his second ball. These were to be Thistle's only matches at state level, although he did play several second XI games the following season. He spent the 2005 English cricket season playing for Havant in the Southern Premier Cricket League, and also played several matches for Hampshire's team in the Second XI Championship. In the WACA district competition, Thistle plays for Bayswater–Morley.
