= Midland-Guildford Cricket Club =

Australian cricket club

Midland Guildford Cricket Club plays in the Western Australian Grade Cricket competition. Their home ground is Lilac Hill Park.

== History ==
Midland Guildford Cricket Club started its association with the WACA in 1902/03 when it submitted a B-Grade team in the WACA Competition under the name Midland Junction and District Turf Cricket Club. In 1910/11 the club was admitted to the First Grade competition with a team also playing in B2-Grade. The home ground at the time was Midland Oval.

In 1914/15 Midland Junction's area took in the Swan District region and changed its name to Midland-Swan Cricket Club.

In 1918/19, arising from the post-war reconstruction of the club, and in deference to the many players from Guildford, the Club's name was again changed to the Midland Guildford Cricket Club. Only a B-Grade team played in the competition for this season.

In 1919/20 Midland Guildford entered a First Grade team in the WACA competition.

In October 1923, it was decided that the club colours would be black and white.

In September 1941, World War II was raging and due to high-pressure work programmes for military requirements in the Midland workshops, no Midland Guildford teams were nominated.

The club remained in abeyance until the 1946/47 season when it was reconstructed. The first game was played in October 1946.

Midland Guildford Cricket Club has always provided a pathway for individuals to develop their game and to aspire to state and international selection. A number of players have attained these goals. The club has further developed overseas players who have gone on to represent their own countries.

In the 1981/82 season, the club moved its home ground from Midland Oval to the picturesque Lilac Hill Park ground in Caversham.

Over the years Midland Guildford Cricket Club has had many successes – the most memorable being the 19-years during which it hosted the Lilac Hill Festival Matches against visiting overseas teams.

The club has a good working relationship with the WACA and now fields four senior men's teams, four junior teams and two female teams.

== Notable players ==
- Jo Angel
- Wally Edwards
- Brendan Julian
- Simon Katich
- Tony Mann
- Tom Moody
- Keith Slater
- Alec Stewart
- Bruce Yardley
- Tim Zoehrer
- Kevin Gartrell
- Dom Sibley
- Tom Colley
