= Chris Mack (cricketer) =

Australian cricketer (born 1970)

Personal information
- Full name: Christopher David Mack
- Born: 30 June 1970 (age 56); Subiaco, Western Australia
- Batting: Right-handed
- Bowling: Right-arm fast
- Role: Bowler

Domestic team information
- Years: Team
- 1989/90–1990/91: Western Australia

Career statistics
Competition	First-class	List A
Matches	9	4
Runs scored	14	12
Batting average	2.33	–
100s/50s	0/0	0/0
Top score	8	12*
Balls bowled	1,811	214
Wickets	22	7
Bowling average	45.00	20.71
5 wickets in innings	0	0
10 wickets in match	0	0
Best bowling	4/72	3/51
Catches/stumpings	1/–	1/–
- Source: CricketArchive, 19 January 2013

Christopher David Mack (born 30 June 1970) is a former Australian cricketer who played several matches for Western Australia during the early 1990s. From Perth, Mack played two series for the Australian under-19 cricket team, and made his state debut aged 19. A right-arm fast bowler, he went on to attend the Australian Cricket Academy and the Western Australian Institute of Sport. Mack was a regular selection at both first-class and List A during the 1989–90 and 1990–91 seasons. Although he later spent a season playing in the Lancashire League in England, he did not play at state level again, with his last match for Western Australia coming at the age of 21.

== Domestic career ==
From Perth, Mack was a talented junior player, making his debut for the state under-19s team aged 17. A right-arm fast bowler, he went on to represent the Australian under-19 cricket team the following season, playing two Tests and three One Day Internationals (ODIs) against the touring New Zealand under-19s in early 1989. Mack was subsequently accepted into the Australian Cricket Academy's 1990 intake group, and later graduated from the cricket program at the Western Australian Institute of Sport. Following good form in an academy game against the touring Sri Lankans, Mack was selected to make his state debut in the first of two limited-overs matches Western Australia was playing against the tourists. The matches, both played at the WACA Ground in early February, were effectively considered trial matches by the state selectors, with Brendan Julian, Mark Palmer, and Darrin Ramshaw also making their List-A debuts. Mack took 1/28 from ten overs in the first match, and 1/32 in the second match.

This form was enough to secure his place in Western Australia's team for the upcoming Sheffield Shield match against Tasmania. On his first-class debut, Mack took 3/70 and 2/27 opening the bowling with Alan Mullally, allowing him to retain his place for the next match. With the bouncy pace of the WACA Ground favouring his style of bowling, he went on to play in all of Western Australia's three remaining Sheffield Shield matches, finishing the season with 11 wickets. Still aged only 19, Mack was able to qualify for an Australian Young Cricketers team that toured the West Indies in August 1989, taking nine wickets at an average of 15.66 in a three-Test series against the West Indies under-19s.

During the 1990–91 season, the majority of Mack's matches were again played at the end of Western Australia's Sheffield Shield campaign. He took eleven wickets from his five matches, but was quite expensive, finishing with an average of 52.27. His best bowling figures in an innings, 4/72, were taken in the second innings of the match against Queensland in January 1991, again assisted by the pitch at the WACA. Mack spent the 1991 English cricket season playing for Burnley in the Lancashire League, as the club's designated professional. In his 26 matches, he took 77 wickets at an average of 20.20 to lead his team's wicket-taking, as well as finishing fourth in the overall wicket-taking. In the succeeding Australian season, Mack was unable to gain selection for the state team, instead playing only colts matches. He did not play for Western Australia again, with his last season played at the age of 21.
