= Drew Porter =

Australian cricketer

Personal information
- Full name: Drew Nathan Porter
- Born: 7 September 1985 (age 41); Attadale, Western Australia
- Batting: Right-handed
- Bowling: Right-arm medium

Domestic team information
- Years: Team
- 2008/09–2011/12: Western Australia
- FC debut: 30 January 2009 Western Australia v Queensland
- Last FC: 25 November 2011 Western Australia v New South Wales
- LA debut: 8 February 2009 Western Australia v South Australia
- Last LA: 6 November 2011 Western Australia v Queensland

Career statistics
Competition	FC	LA	T20
Matches	5	4	1
Runs scored	62	43	0
Batting average	7.75	14.33	0.00
100s/50s	0/0	0/0	0/0
Top score	18*	36*	0
Balls bowled	684	126	18
Wickets	10	1	2
Bowling average	45.60	83.00	13.50
5 wickets in innings	0	0	0
10 wickets in match	0	0	0
Best bowling	2/27	1/40	2/27
Catches/stumpings	5/–	2/–	0/–
- Source: CricketArchive, 15 October 2011

Drew Nathan Porter (born 7 September 1985) is an Australian former cricketer.

The son of Graeme Porter, who played One Day International cricket for Australia, Porter was educated at Leeming Primary School and Kent Street Senior High School. He played cricket from an early age, representing Western Australia at schoolboy, Under-15, Under-17 and Under-19, and was named in the Australian Cricket Board's Under-17 development squad in 2003.

He played cricket in England in 2006, playing for Bashley (Rydal) in the Southern Premier League and Second XI matches for Hampshire.

Porter made his first-class debut for Western Australia against Queensland in January 2009, making 18 not out and taking one wicket. He has played three further first-class matches, as well as three List A and one Twenty20 match. He also plays grade cricket for Melville in the Western Australian Grade Cricket competition.
