= Scarborough Cricket Club (Australia) =

Cricket club based in Western Australia

Scarborough Cricket Club plays in the Western Australian Grade Cricket competition, the Retravision Shield. Nicknamed the Gulls, its home ground is Abbett Park. The club was founded in 1946.

One of Western Australia's most successful cricket clubs in recent history, Scarborough won the 1st Grade competition in 2006–07, 2007–08, 2008–09 and 2009–10, the first team to win four straight titles since 1919.

Scarborough's head coach since 2006 is former Gulls paceman Simon Bowman, while batsman Clint Heron captained the 2008–09 and 2009–10 grand final wins.

The club has produced several players who have represented Australia, most notably Justin Langer, Marcus Stoinis and Marcus Harris. Daryl Mitchell represented the club whilst living in Perth before going on to represent his native New Zealand.

Its most recent State or BBL representatives include Theo Doropoulos, Michael Johnson, Andrew Tye, Justin Coetzee, Cooper Connolly and Matthew Spoors.
