= John Inverarity =

Australian cricketer

Personal information
- Full name: Robert John Inverarity
- Born: 31 January 1944 (age 82); Subiaco, Western Australia
- Batting: Right-handed
- Bowling: Slow left-arm orthodox
- Role: Batsman
- Relatives: Merv Inverarity (father); Alison Inverarity (daughter)

International information
- National side: Australia
- Test debut (cap 246): 25 July 1968 v England
- Last Test: 10 August 1972 v England

Domestic team information
- Years: Team
- 1962/63–1978/79: Western Australia
- 1979/80–1984/85: South Australia

Career statistics
| Competition | Test | FC | LA |
|---|---|---|---|
| Matches | 6 | 223 | 30 |
| Runs scored | 174 | 11,777 | 686 |
| Batting average | 17.39 | 35.90 | 32/66 |
| 100s/50s | 0/1 | 26/60 | 0/5 |
| Top score | 56 | 187 | 90 |
| Balls bowled | 372 | 16,840 | 615 |
| Wickets | 4 | 221 | 15 |
| Bowling average | 23.25 | 30.67 | 25.80 |
| 5 wickets in innings | 0 | 7 | 0 |
| 10 wickets in match | 0 | 0 | 0 |
| Best bowling | 3/26 | 7/86 | 3/19 |
| Catches/stumpings | 4/– | 251/– | 20/– |
- Source: CricketArchive, 19 January 2013

Robert John Inverarity MBE (born 31 January 1944) is a former Australian cricketer who played six Test matches. A right-handed batsman and left-arm orthodox spin bowler in his playing career, Inverarity was also one of the enduring captains in the Australian Sheffield Shield during the late 1970s and early 1980s, captaining both Western Australia and South Australia.

Inverarity was chair of selectors for Cricket Australia from 2011 to 2014.

== Cricket career overview ==
Inverarity played in six Tests between 1968 and 1972 and played first class cricket for Western Australia, South Australia and Australia over a period of twenty-three years between 1962 and 1985. As a state player, he captained Western Australia to Sheffield Shield glory four times in five years. When his teaching career took him to Adelaide his new team of South Australia went on to win the Shield in 1981–82. After retiring from cricket in 1985 (aged 41) he continued teaching, before going into coaching on the English county scene with Kent and Warwickshire.

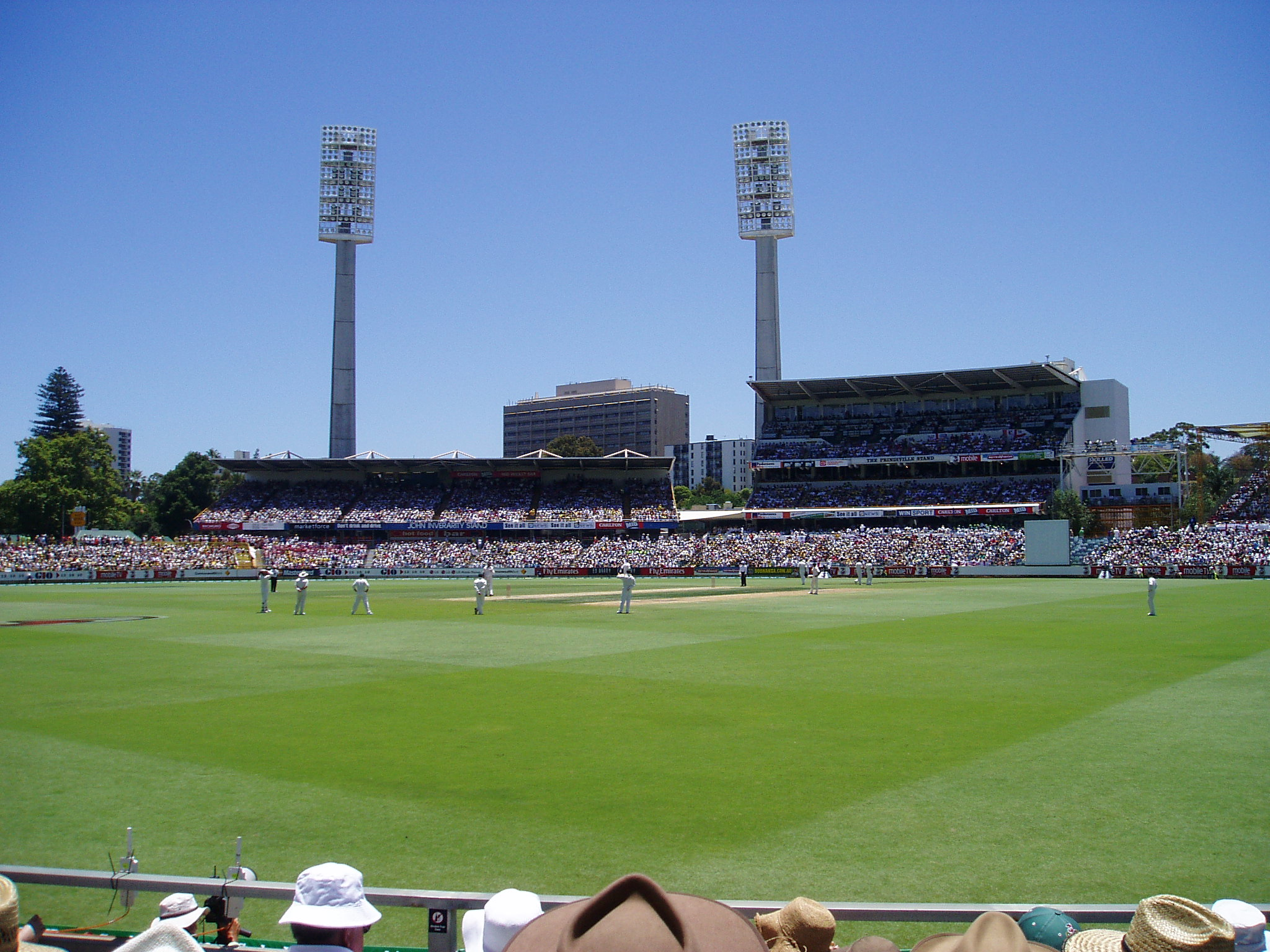
The Inverarity Stand (centre-left) at the WACA Ground

To recognise his contribution to the state team, the Western Australian Cricket Association named a stand at the WACA cricket ground in his honour. The stand, built in 1970 for the WACA's inaugural Test and initially named the "Test Stand", was later renamed to the "Inverarity-Western Underwriters Stand". It has since been demolished.

In 2011, Inverarity was named as the new full-time chairman of selectors for Cricket Australia, beating a high-profile field including Geoff Lawson, Tom Moody, Rod Marsh and chair Trevor Hohns.

== Teaching ==
Inverarity began his career as a teacher during the twilight years of his cricketing career. He taught mathematics at various prestigious independent schools (including stints at Tonbridge School and King's College School in the United Kingdom) and also served as Vice-Principal at Pembroke School (1981–1988) in Adelaide and Guildford Grammar School, and Headmaster of Hale School (1989–2003) in Perth. In 2001, the new music and drama centre at Hale was named in his honour – The John Inverarity Music and Drama Centre. In 2006, he was appointed warden of St George's College, a residential college of the University of Western Australia. He was also appointed as a member of the University Senate by the Governor Ken Michael.

== Family ==
Inverarity's father was Merv Inverarity, a Western Australian first-class cricketer during the 1930s and '40s and later senior administrator within the Western Australian Cricket Association.

Inverarity's daughter Alison Inverarity was an Olympic high jumper, representing Australia at the 1992, 1996 and 2000 Summer Olympics.

== Cricket biography ==
=== Early First-class cricket ===
Inverarity made his first class debut in 1962–3. He made 127 runs at 25.40. In 1963–64 he made 517 runs at 28.72, including 42 against NSW. In 1964–65 he made 385 at 35.00 with a top score of 144. During these seasons, he occasionally bowled but took no wickets.

In 1965–66 he made 549 runs at 39.21, including a career high of 177, and took 2 wickets at 26. In 1966–67 he made 183 runs at 36.60, with a top score of 114 and took no wickets.

In 1967–68 Inverarity made 779 runs at 59.92 and took 4 wickets. Highlights included 82 against Victoria. This consistent form led to his selection on the 1968 Ashes.

=== Test player ===
In England Inverarity impressed batting nearly four hours in a tour game against Leicestershire to make 67. Other efforts included 70 against Northamptonshire Inverarity was made 12th man for the first test. He made his test debut in the fourth test, when Bill Lawry was injured. He scored 8 and 34 in a drawn game that ensured Australia kept the Ashes. (His first scoring shot was a boundary).

Inverarity kept his spot for the fifth test at the Oval. In the first innings he scored 1 in the first innings, then played his most famous test match innings: 56 off 253 balls, having opened the innings he was last man out, failing to save the game, with only minutes left in the match. This squared the series 1-1. On the tour overall he scored 645 runs at 24.80 and took two wickets.

In 1968–69 Inverarity player the first test against the West Indies but was then dropped in favour of Doug Walters. He made 660 first class runs that summer at 44.00 and took two wickets. A score of 159 against NSW was his 11th first class century and fourth century that summer. He also made 103 against NSW.

Inverarity was not picked on the Australian team to tour India and South Africa in 1969–70. Playing at home he made 377 runs at 31.41 and took no wickets. In one Shield game at the Adelaide Oval, he was nearly dismissed by a bird – he was clean-bowled for 0 by a ball from Greg Chappell that deviated in mid-air after fatally hitting a swallow. He was recalled by umpire Colin Egar, going on to make 89 runs.

Inverarity toured New Zealand in early 1970 with an Australian XI that included Greg Chappell and Dennis Lillee. Inverarity was vice captain to Sam Trimble. He made 376 runs at 37.60, including a century against Otago. In the same game he also took 5–28, his first five-wicket haul. He also scored a century against the New Zealand XI.

In 1970–71 Inverarity scored 810 runs at 54.00 and took 9 wickets at 39.8, but was unable to force his way into the test team.

=== Test recall ===
In 1971–72 Inverarity scored 742 runs at 41.22 and took 13 wickets at 33. That summer he became WA captain. He scored 66 for WA against the touring World XI.

In December 1971 he and John Benaud were picked in the Australian side to play the World XI, replacing Ian Redpath and Bruce Francis. Inverarity was also picked as vice captain. This was despite him having made three successive ducks for WA. However he was ruled unfit to play and was replaced by Graeme Watson. Inverarity recovered to play for Australia in the fourth and fifth tests.

Inverarity was selected for the 1972 Ashes, although Keith Stackpole was preferred as vice captain. However he was the third selector.

Inverarity was chosen in the side for the first test (his first since 1968).

He was left out of the side for the 3rd test in favour of Ashley Mallett. He replaced Bruce Francis for the fourth test. He kept his spot for the fifth test.

In England in 1972 he scored 553 runs at 26.33 and took 37 wickets at 26.5.

=== First Class Player ===
In 1972–73 Inverarity made 380 runs at 34.54 and took 7 wickets at 31.

In 1973–74 he made 681 runs at 48.64 and took one wicket.

In 1974–75 he made 426 runs at 28.40 and took four wickets.

In 1975–76 he made 93 runs at 15.50. He went to work in England in 1976–7, teaching at Tonbridge School, Kent.

=== World Series Cricket ===
Inverarity returned to Australia for the beginning of the 1977–78 season, resuming his captaincy of Western Australia. There was some talk that Inverarity might be recalled to the Australian team to captain, but this subsided when Bob Simpson elected to return to test cricket.

That season Inverarity scored 470 runs at 33.57 and took 12 wickets at 19.6. He also led WA to another Sheffield Shield victory.

Simpson led Australia on the 1978 tour of the West Indies, after which he retired. At the beginning of the 1978–79 summer there was press speculation again that Inverarity would be selected in the test side, and he scored 187 in a Shield game at the beginning of the summer. However he was overlooked; Graham Yallop led Australia to a 5–1 defeat against England. Inverarity scored 510 runs at 51.00 and took five wickets. He scored 102 against NSW.

=== South Australia ===
World Series Cricket players returned to state sides in the summer of 1979–80. Inverarity moved to South Australia and played for that state. He made 365 runs at 26.07 and took five wickets.

In 1980–81, a summer where he was increasingly unavailable due to work commitments, he scored 321 runs at 26.75 and took three wickets.

In 1981–82 Inverarity served as vice captain to David Hookes in South Australia. Inverarity made 348 runs at 38.66 and took 30 wickets at 21.3. He scored his first century in three seasons, against Queensland, in what was his 126th Sheffield Shield game, making him the person who had played most Shield matches. He also took 5–40 against NSW. South Australia won the Sheffield Shield.

In 1982–83 he made 698 runs at 43.62 and took 19 wickets at 38.

In 1983–84 he made 419 runs at 41.90 and took 18 wickets at 49.5.

In 1984–85 Inverarity made 363 runs at 25.92 and took a career best 43 wickets at 23.6. During this summer there was some press speculation that Inverarity could be recalled to the national side to captain Australia in the wake of the resignation of Kim Hughes. However he was not chosen. Inverarity's last game was against Qld. He scored a fighting 55. "He batted very well," said Jeff Thomson. "I gave him everything today and he never backed away once. A younger man would have given it away but he stuck to his task." He also took 7-86, a career best performance. Inverarity said:

I may be getting the wickets but my legs tell me it's time to quit. I made the decision to play until the end of this season and I'm content to live with that. I'll stick by that decision no matter what happens over the next two days... I think people who retire because they're playing badly and likely to get dropped are copping out. If you're good enough you get picked and if you're not you don't. I've always been prepared to throw my hat in the ring and take that risk."

== Coach ==
In 2003 Inverarity was director of coaching at Warwickshire and kept the position for three years. They won the 2004 championship. He later said of the team "They played very determined cricket, game after game. They kept the pressure on for four days. It was a reward for application and bowling persistently, patiently, and for the batsmen it was about enduring the difficult periods and making hay when things got better."

== Selector ==
Inverarity served as Australian cricket selector from 2011 to 2014. He was replaced as chairman by Rod Marsh.
