= Sam Gannon =

Australian cricketer (1947–2021)

Sam Gannon OAM
Personal information
- Born: 8 February 1947
- Died: 5 February 2021 (aged 73)
- Batting: Right-handed
- Bowling: Left-arm fast-medium

International information
- National side: Australia
- Test debut (cap 290): 16 December 1977 v India
- Last Test: 7 January 1978 v India

Domestic team information
- Years: Team
- 1966/67–1978/79: Western Australia

Career statistics
Competition	Test	FC	LA
Matches	3	40	10
Runs scored	3	141	4
Batting average	3.00	6.40	4.00
100s/50s	0/0	0/0	0/0
Top score	3*	20	3*
Balls bowled	726	3,565	617
Wickets	11	117	17
Bowling average	32.81	30.47	20.94
5 wickets in innings	0	2	0
10 wickets in match	0	0	0
Best bowling	4/77	6/107	4/21
Catches/stumpings	3/–	19/–	5/–
- Source: Cricinfo, 25 May 2020

John Bryant "Sam" Gannon OAM (8 February 1947 – 5 February 2021) was an Australian cricketer who played in three Test matches during the 1977/78 season.

== Career ==
Gannon made his first-class debut for Western Australia in 1966–67, taking three wickets against Victoria and 6/107 against South Australia.

He played in the Shield-winning WA sides of 1967–68 and took seven wickets against the touring Indian side.

In 1970–71 he took 4/41 against the touring English side.

In 1971–72 he took 5/97 against Victoria. WA won the Shield that year.

From November 1972 he did not play for WA for five years.

=== World Series Cricket and Test Selection ===
When World Series Cricket happened he was recalled to the West Australian side and had a strong season. He took four wickets against NSW and 4/70 against India.

He was called into the Australian side for the second Test against India, replacing an injured Alan Hurst.

He took 3/84 and 4/77 (including a spell of 4/13), helping Australia win by two wickets. This effort meant Gannon kept his place for the next two Tests.

He took only four wickets over the next two Tests, both of which Australia lost. Gannon was dropped for the 5th Test against India and the subsequent tour of West Indies in favour of Ian Callen. According to one report, "Gannon captured 11 wickets at 32.82 in his three Tests, but most of his victims were tailenders, and the top order Indian batsmen seldom experienced difficulty against him."

At the beginning of the 1978–79 season, selector Neil Harvey said Gannon was a prospect for Test selection. However he was not picked and the season turned out to be his last.

== Post-playing career ==
Following his retirement from cricket, Gannon became a highly successful businessman.

Gannon was elected chairman of the Western Australian Cricket Association in August 2013.

Gannon was awarded the Medal of the Order of Australia (OAM) in the 2017 Queen's Birthday Honours for service to cricket.

He died three days before his 74th birthday.
