= Fremantle District Cricket Club =

Personnel
- Captain: Jake Carder
- Coach: Joe Piromalli

Team information
- Founded: 1852
- Home ground: Stevens Reserve
- Official website: Fremantle District Cricket Club

Fremantle District Cricket Club is a cricket club which competes in the Western Australian Grade Cricket competition, the highest level of club cricket in Western Australia.

== History ==
Records of a cricket club known as Fremantle Cricket Club date back to at least the early 1880s when an annual cricket match was played between the Metropolitan Cricket Club (representing Perth) and Fremantle CC. The current club dates its history to 1886.

== Home ground ==
The club plays its home fixtures at Stevens Reserve, Fremantle and shares the facilities with the Fremantle Hockey Club.

== Records ==
- Highest Score For: 9/587 v. Subiaco-Floreat 1978/79
- Highest Score Against: 495 by Karrakatta 1897/98
- Lowest Score For: 10 v. North Perth 1907/08
- Lowest Score Against: 12 by I Zingari 1886/87
- Highest aggregate in career: 6133 by Merv Inverarity
- Highest aggregate in season: 834 by Phil O'Meara in 1978/79
- Highest individual score: 208 by Mitchell Marsh v. Gosnells Cricket Club, Sutherland Park 2008/09
