= Graeme Porter =

Australian cricketer (born 1955)

Personal information
- Full name: Graeme David Porter
- Born: 18 March 1955 (age 71); Middle Swan, Western Australia
- Batting: Right-handed
- Bowling: Right-arm medium
- Role: Bowler

International information
- National side: Australia
- ODI debut (cap 56): 13 June 1979 v Pakistan
- Last ODI: 16 June 1979 v Canada

Domestic team information
- Years: Team
- 1976/77–1986/87: Western Australia

Career statistics
Competition	ODI	FC	LA
Matches	2	30	14
Runs scored	3	666	30
Batting average	3.00	21.48	6.00
100s/50s	0/0	0/4	0/0
Top score	3	64	16
Balls bowled	108	4,392	741
Wickets	3	52	22
Bowling average	11.00	32.26	17.50
5 wickets in innings	0	0	0
10 wickets in match	0	0	0
Best bowling	2/13	4/59	4/49
Catches/stumpings	1/–	20/–	2/–
- Source: CricInfo, 24 October 2013

Graeme David Porter (born 18 March 1955) is a former Australian international cricketer.

He played in two 1979 Cricket World Cup matches in England as a medium pace bowler taking three wickets at an average of 11.00. He also took 52 wickets in 32 first-class matches for Western Australia.

After retiring from professional cricket, he taught mathematics at Trinity College, Perth and at Kent Street Senior High School, where he also coached their cricket scholarship team. His son, Drew Porter, also played for Western Australia.
