= Mark McPhee =

Australian cricketer

Personal information
- Full name: Mark William McPhee
- Born: 25 January 1964; Katanning, Western Australia
- Died: 15 August 1999 (aged 35); Gingin, Western Australia
- Batting: Right-handed
- Role: Opening batsman

Domestic team information
- Years: Team
- 1984/85–1993/94: Western Australia
- FC debut: 9 November 1984 Western Australia v Victoria
- Last FC: 29 October 1993 Western Australia v Queensland
- LA debut: 13 October 1985 Western Australia v South Australia
- Last LA: 6 February 1994 Western Australia v New South Wales

Career statistics
Competition	First-class	List A
Matches	40	17
Runs scored	1,699	594
Batting average	27.85	37.12
100s/50s	2/9	0/5
Top score	135	97
Catches/stumpings	16/–	6/–
- Source: CricketArchive, 6 October 2011

Mark William McPhee (25 January 1964 – 15 August 1999) was an Australian cricketer who played for Western Australia from 1984 to 1999.

== Career ==
Having previously attended the Western Australian Institute of Sport and played for the Western Australia under-19 cricket team, McPhee made his first-class debut for Western Australia against Victoria in November 1984, scoring 85 runs from 127 balls batting at number five before being dismissed by Merv Hughes. Playing almost exclusively as an opening batsman, McPhee recorded two centuries in his first-class career, with a highest score of 135. In total, McPhee scored 1699 runs in 40 first-class games at an average of 27.85, and 594 runs in 17 limited overs games at an average of 37.12, with a highest score of 97.

In August 1999, McPhee was killed when a truck collided with his four-wheel drive near Gingin. The Mark McPhee Memorial Trophy was established by the Fremantle and North Perth Cricket Clubs, the two teams he played for in the Western Australian Grade Cricket competition.
