= Mount Lawley District Cricket Club =

Mount Lawley District Cricket Club is a semi-professional cricket club which plays in Western Australian Grade Cricket competition which is now referred as Western Australian Premier Cricket. The club joined the Western Australian Cricket Association "A" grade district competition as the Maylands-Mount Lawley Cricket Club in 1924-25 after having applied for entry two years earlier. The name was changed to Mount Lawley Cricket Club in 1927–28.

The club's first home ground was Maylands Oval, which later became known as Shearn Park. This was granted in 1923. In 1947-48 senior matches moved to Inglewood Oval, then in October 1978 to Cornwall Reserve in Dianella. In 1982-83 the ground was renamed Breckler Park.

== Current A grade squad ==
Current A grade team is captained by former Sussex and Glamorgan first class cricketer Stewart Walters and include players like Clint Hinchliffe who now represents Melbourne stars in Big Bash league and formerly represented Perth scorchers and Western Australia in first class cricket. All rounder Darius D'Silva represents United Arab Emirates in International Cricket where he debuted in ODI and T20I formats recently.Veteran Chris Prescott and Braydon Thompson adds experience in pace department while spinner Mohamed Ijaz, a former Sri Lanka under 19 representative is also part of the squad. Opening Batsman Corey Evans has represented the State in under age cricket. Other squad members include pace bowling all rounder Liam Purdy, wicket keeper batsman Andrew Bottega, middle order batsmen Oliver Mouchemore, Ethan Petta and Nic Marciano. Head coach of the club is David Virgo.

== Notable players ==
Chris Matthews was the first homegrown Mount Lawley player to join the Australian team. Other notable Mount Lawley players who played international cricket include Ashley Mallett, Terry Jenner, Tony Mann, Colin Milburn, Geoff Marsh, Dermot Reeve, Ravi Ratnayeke, Mike Veletta, Michael Klinger, Dean Brownlie, and Chris Jordan, Even though John McGuire hasn’t played international cricket, he was considered to be one of the best batsman of his generation and scored over 10000 first grade runs and holds several of the batting records of Mount Lawley. Other notable first class cricketers include Paul Davis and Tom Beaton.
