= Brian Hanna =

Australian cricketer (born 1946)

Personal information
- Full name: Brian Leslie Hanna
- Born: 7 October 1946 (age 80); Katanning, Western Australia
- Batting: Right-handed
- Bowling: Right-arm medium
- Role: Batsman

Domestic team information
- Years: Team
- 1970/71–1972/73: Western Australia
- FC debut: 29 January 1971 Western Australia v New Zealanders
- Last FC: 15 December 1972 Western Australia v South Australia
- LA debut: 31 January 1971 Western Australia v New Zealanders
- Last LA: 29 October 1972 Western Australia v South Australia

Career statistics
Competition	First-class	List A
Matches	7	3
Runs scored	213	8
Batting average	17.75	2.66
100s/50s	0/1	0/0
Top score	51*	8
Balls bowled	32	–
Wickets	0	–
Bowling average	–	–
5 wickets in innings	–	–
10 wickets in match	–	–
Best bowling	–	–
Catches/stumpings	6/–	0/–
- Source: CricketArchive, 12 October 2011

Brian Leslie Hanna (born 7 October 1946) is an Australian former cricketer. Originally from Katanning, he played seven first-class and three List A matches for Western Australia from the 1970–71 to 1972–73 seasons. Playing mainly as a top-order batsman, he made 213 runs at an average of 17.75, with a highest score of 51 not out.
