= Giles Bush =

Australian cricketer (born 1956)

Personal information
- Born: 9 September 1956 (age 70); Perth, Western Australia
- Source: Cricinfo, 6 November 2017

Giles Bush (born 9 September 1956) is an Australian cricketer. He played nine first-class matches for Western Australia between 1984/85 and 1990/91.
