= Matt Johnston =

Australian former professional cricketer (born 1985)

Personal information
- Full name: Matthew James Johnston
- Born: 15 October 1985 (age 41); South Perth, Western Australia
- Batting: Left-handed
- Bowling: Right-arm medium
- Role: All-rounder

Domestic team information
- Years: Team
- 2006/07–2010/11: Western Australia
- 2011/12–2012/13: Tasmania
- 2011/12: Hobart Hurricanes
- 2012/13: Adelaide Strikers

Career statistics
Competition	FC	LA	T20
Matches	4	21	11
Runs scored	141	302	75
Batting average	23.50	27.45	18.75
100s/50s	0/0	0/0	0/0
Top score	59	44	17
Balls bowled	222	304	138
Wickets	3	6	7
Bowling average	36.00	36.00	27.85
5 wickets in innings	0	0	0
10 wickets in match	0	0	0
Best bowling	1/17	4/28	2/5
Catches/stumpings	2/–	1/–	2/–
- Source: CricketArchive, 19 January 2013

Matthew James Johnston (born 15 October 1985) is an Australian former professional cricketer who played for Tasmania, Western Australia, Adelaide Strikers and Hobart Hurricanes.

Johnston played grade cricket for Willetton, and won the Olly Cooley Medal for best player in the Western Australian Grade Cricket competition in 2010 and 2011.

He played one first-class, 17 List A and four Twenty20 cricket matches for Western Australia between 2007 and 2011, before being dropped at the end of the 2010–11 season. He went on to be signed by Tasmania in June 2011, and by the Hobart Hurricanes in the Big Bash League in July 2011.

Johnston played two matches for Walsden in the Central Lancashire League in 2005 as their overseas player, taking 3 wickets at an average of 12.67 and making 41 runs in his only innings.
