= Rob Kelly (cricketer) =

Australian cricketer (born 1969)

Personal information
- Born: 18 May 1969 (age 57); Perth, Western Australia
- Source: Cricinfo, 10 November 2017

Rob Kelly (born 18 May 1969) is an Australian cricketer. He played three first-class matches for Western Australia in 1992/93.
