= Trent Kelly (cricketer) =

Australian cricketer (born 1984)

Trent Peter Kelly (born 24 March 1984 in Henley Beach) is a former Australian cricketer who played first-class cricket for South Australia and Western Australia. In Adelaide, his grade cricket club was the Western Eagles.

Kelly was a right-arm paceman and right-handed batsman who played eight matches of first-class cricket between 2004 and 2011 and seven List A matches between 2002 and 2008. He retired in October 2015. Kelly was an assistant coach for the South Australian under-19 team at the 2014–15 Under 19 National Championships.

Since his retirement from playing, Kelly has worked as a groundsman in Adelaide. He supervised the preparation of the pitches used for the opening rounds of the 2020–21 Sheffield Shield season.
