= Darrin Ramshaw =

Australian cricketer (born 1965)

Personal information
- Full name: Darrin Joseph Ramshaw
- Born: 29 November 1965 (age 60); Subiaco, Western Australia
- Batting: Right-handed
- Role: Batsman; Occasional wicket-keeper

Domestic team information
- Years: Team
- 1989/90: Western Australia
- 1990/91–1993/94: Victoria

Career statistics
Competition	First-class	LA
Matches	24	9
Runs scored	1,165	300
Batting average	27.73	33.33
100s/50s	0/9	0/3
Top score	85	82
Catches/stumpings	33/0	1/0
- Source: CricketArchive, 15 January 2013

Darrin Joseph Ramshaw (born 29 November 1965) is a former Australian cricketer who played at domestic level for Western Australia and Victoria during the late 1980s and early 1990s. The son of Graham Ramshaw, Ramshaw was a talented junior sportsman, playing Australian rules football for the Perth Football Club in the West Australian Football League (WAFL) and representing the Australian under-19 cricket team. He made his Sheffield Shield debut for Western Australia during the 1989–90 season, but moved to Victoria the following season, where he established himself as an opening batsman. Later moving to the middle order, in the absence of Dean Jones Ramshaw captained Victoria in several matches during the 1993–94 season, but that season was his last at state level. He later served as assistant coach of Tasmania and coach of Western Australia's under-19 team.

== Career ==
The son of Graham Ramshaw, a leading Australian rules football player, Ramshaw grew up in Perth, Western Australia, and occasionally played matches for the Perth Football Club in the West Australian Football League (WAFL). A talented junior sportsman, he played cricket for Western Australia at under-16, under-19, and colts level, and toured the British Isles during the 1983 season with the Australian national under-19 cricket team, playing three Tests and two One Day Internationals (ODIs). On tour, Ramshaw led Australia's Test runs aggregates, with 111 runs from two innings, and finished third in the ODI aggregates. His form on tour led to his selection for Test and ODI series the following year against a Sri Lankan under-19 team, with the Australian under-19s including two future Australian captains—Mark Taylor and Steve Waugh.

Ramshaw debuted at state level during the 1989–90 season, playing his first first-class in that season's Sheffield Shield, against South Australia at the WACA Ground. Scoring eleven runs on debut in a match where Geoff Marsh scored a triple century (355 not out), later in the season he played two further Shield matches and two limited-overs matches against the touring Sri Lankan national team. With Western Australia's batting line-up at the time including internationals Mike Veletta, Geoff Marsh, Graeme Wood, and Tom Moody, as well as experienced state players Wayne Andrews and Mark McPhee, Ramshaw moved to Victoria the following season to further his career. He spent most of the 1990–91 season playing second XI matches, but was promoted to the Sheffield Shield team for two matches late in the season. Ramshaw was subsequently included in the squad for its 1991 tour of England, playing in two matches against Essex County Cricket Club.

Now usually playing as an opening batsman, and often partnering with Wayne Phillips, Ramshaw was a regular selection in Victoria's team during the 1991–92 Sheffield Shield, playing seven matches for 371 runs at an average of 33.72. This included four half-centuries, although he was never able to progress past 60 runs in a single innings. During the season, Ramshaw also played two matches in the one-day Federated Automobile Insurance Cup, serving as wicket-keeper in the match against New South Wales in the absence of regular keeper Darren Berry. He did not play at all the following season, but returned for the 1993–94 season, which was to be his last at state level. Displaced from his previous role as an opener, Ramshaw played as a middle-order batsman, scoring 502 runs at an average of 29.52 from nine matches. This again included four half-centuries, with his highest first-class score an innings of 85 runs against New South Wales. Late in the season, when regular captain Dean Jones was on international duty, Ramshaw served as captain of Victoria for three Shield matches and two one-day matches. After the conclusion of his playing career, he served as assistant coach of Tasmania for a period in the early 2000s, as well as co-coach of Western Australia's under-19 team during the 2003–04 season, with Doug Harris.
