= Sean Cary =

Australian former cricket player

Personal information
- Full name: Sean Ross Cary
- Born: 10 March 1971 (age 55); Subiaco, Western Australia
- Batting: Right-handed
- Bowling: Right-arm fast-medium
- Role: Bowler

Domestic team information
- Years: Team
- 1994/95–2001/02: Western Australia
- FC debut: 29 October 1994 Western Australia v England XI
- Last FC: 8 November 2001 Western Australia v Queensland
- LA debut: 30 November 1994 Western Australia v Zimbabweans
- Last LA: 3 February 2002 Western Australia v New South Wales

Career statistics
Competition	First-class	List A
Matches	39	16
Runs scored	178	8
Batting average	8.47	-
100s/50s	0/0	0/0
Top score	13	7*
Balls bowled	8,011	763
Wickets	102	11
Bowling average	36.01	47.72
5 wickets in innings	0	0
10 wickets in match	0	0
Best bowling	4/9	2/25
Catches/stumpings	14/–	3/–
- Source: CricketArchive, 17 July 2012

Sean Ross Cary (born 10 March 1971) is an Australian former cricketer. Cary played for Western Australia in Australian domestic cricket. After retiring he became an administrator and has served as a match referee.
