= Theo Doropoulos =

Australian cricketer

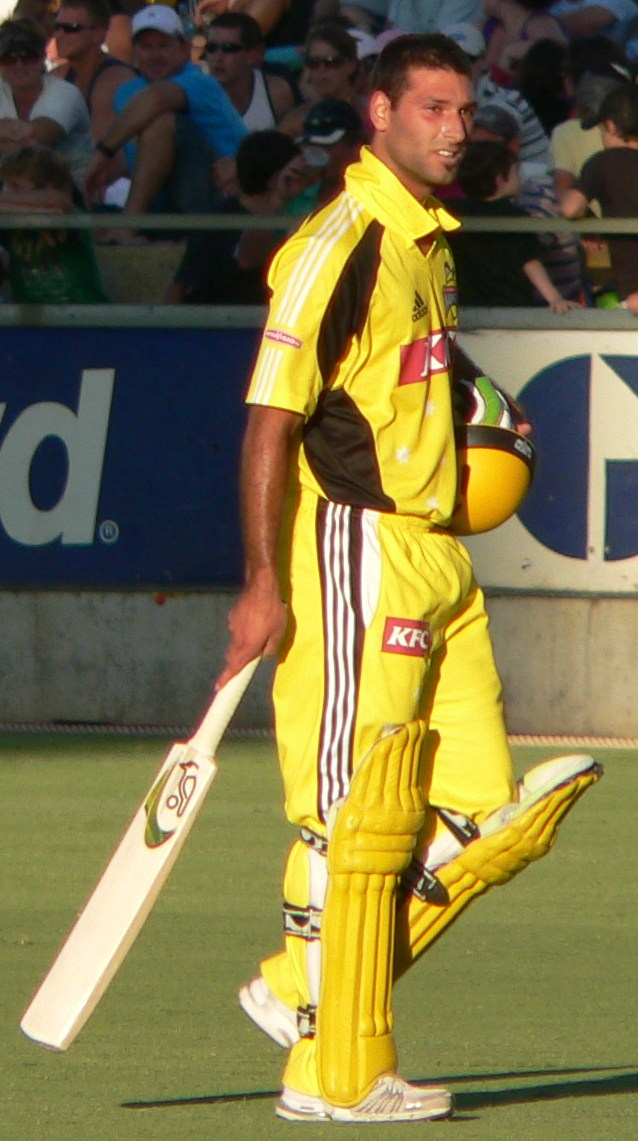

Personal information
- Full name: Theo Paul Doropoulos
- Born: 25 April 1985 (age 41); Subiaco, Western Australia
- Nickname: Zoolander
- Height: 182 cm (6 ft 0 in)
- Batting: Right-handed
- Bowling: Right-arm fast-medium
- Role: Batsman

Domestic team information
- Years: Team
- 2006/07–2009/10: Western Australia
- 2011/12: South Australia
- 2012/13: Wellington

Career statistics
Competition	FC	LA	T20
Matches	10	23	20
Runs scored	300	581	224
Batting average	20.00	29.05	18.86
100s/50s	0/2	0/5	0/0
Top score	65	92	43
Balls bowled	348	204	66
Wickets	5	3	5
Bowling average	51.00	65.66	22.00
5 wickets in innings	0	0	0
10 wickets in match	0	0	0
Best bowling	2/16	1/13	3/24
Catches/stumpings	6/–	8/–	13/–
- Source: CricInfo, 15 December 2018

Theo Paul Doropoulos (born 25 April 1985) is an Australian journalist and former Australian cricketer of Greek descent. He played for South Australia, Western Australia and Wellington.

Doropoulos is currently weekend sports presenter on Seven News in Melbourne.

== Career ==
Doropoulos represented Australia at under-19 level, Western Australia at both under-17 and under-19 and played for Hale School in the Darlot Cup and South Shields Cricket Club in the English North East Premier League. He played as a right-handed batsman and bowled right-arm fast-medium. He made his Twenty20 debut for Western Australia in January 2007 and his first-class cricket and List A cricket debuts in November 2007.

Doropoulos previously held the record for the highest score in an under-19 One Day International, scoring 179 not out against England in 2003.

Doropoulos’s most noticeable moment came during a test match between Australia and the West Indies at the WACA Ground in 2009 when after Nathan Hauritz went down with an injury during the West Indies second innings with Doropoulos becoming a substitute fielder in his place. Doropoulos upon his introduction to the field dropped a catch from Sulieman Benn off his WA teammate Mitchell Johnson. However, he made amends soon after, catching Benn, again off the bowling of Johnson. Doropoulos was mistaken in several times by commentators, most notably Michael Slater, who said it was Marcus Stoinis who took the catch.

In June 2011, after being dropped from Western Australia's squad, Doropoulos signed with South Australia. He also played 3 matches for the Adelaide Strikers in the Big Bash League.

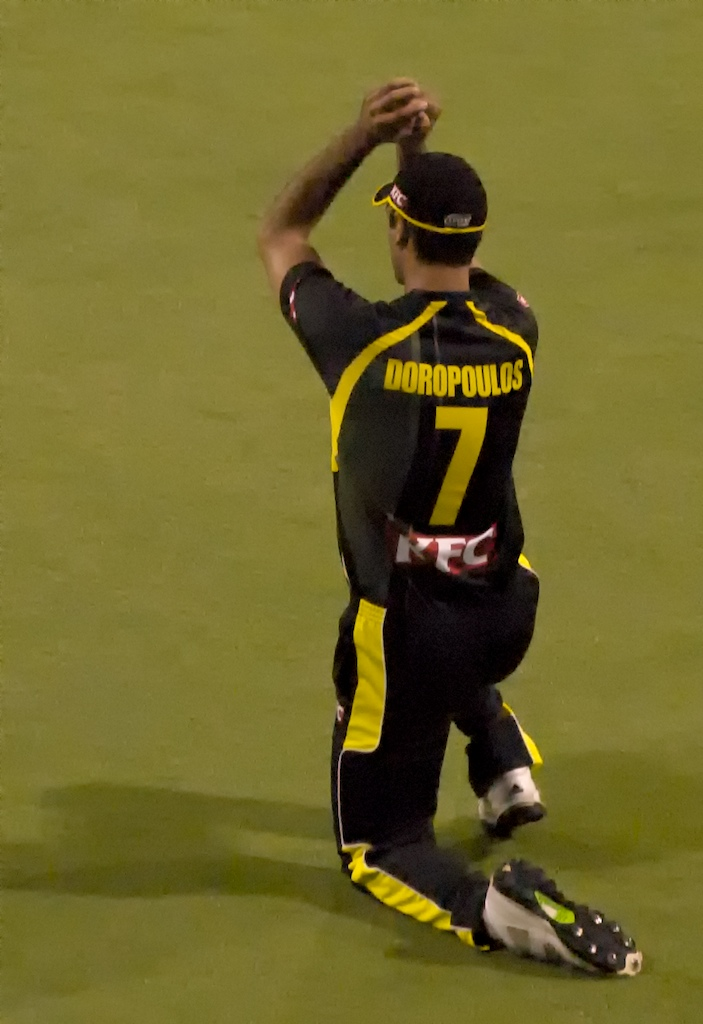
Doropoulos fielding for WA against Victoria in the 2009–10 KFC Twenty20 Big Bash.

== Media career ==
After South Australia did not offer him a contract in 2012, Doropoulos transitioned into media, becoming a sports reporter for the Seven Network in Adelaide. On Seven News Adelaide, he primarily covered AFL football while also reporting on cricket, his former sport.

In 2024, he moved to Melbourne and took on a similar role at Seven News Melbourne. He also appeared as a boundary commentator for the network’s cricket coverage, a role he had previously performed on Triple M’s AFL broadcasts.

In February 2025, Doropoulos replaced Abbey Gelmi as the weekend sports presenter on Seven News Melbourne.
