= Justin Coetzee =

Australian cricketer (born 1984)

Personal information
- Full name: Justin Petrus Coetzee
- Born: 12 June 1984 (age 42); Durban, Natal, South Africa
- Batting: Left-handed
- Bowling: Left-arm fast-medium
- Role: All-rounder

Domestic team information
- Years: Team
- 2008/09–2009/10: Western Australia

Career statistics
Competition	FC	LA	T20
Matches	1	5	1
Runs scored	16	49	23
Batting average	8.00	16.33	–
100s/50s	0/0	0/0	0/0
Top score	15	39	23*
Balls bowled	108	150	–
Wickets	2	1	–
Bowling average	27.50	135.00	–
5 wickets in innings	0	0	–
10 wickets in match	0	0	–
Best bowling	1/18	1/33	–
Catches/stumpings	1/–	0/–	1/–
- Source: CricketArchive, 2 October 2011

Justin Petrus Coetzee (born 12 June 1984) is a South-Africa-born Australian cricketer who previously played for Western Australia. He is an all-rounder who bats left-handed and is a left-arm medium bowler.

== Career ==
Coetzee first came to notice playing for the Western Australian 2nd XI side against the touring Pakistan XI in 2004, when he took 10 wickets in the match. After playing a few more games for the second XI in the 2004-05 summer, he did not make his senior debut for the Warriors until 2009, when he was selected in a Twenty20 match against Queensland at the WACA Ground. He did not bowl and dropped a difficult chance, but was more successful with the bat, scoring 23 not out from 15 balls to be the second top scorer for the Warriors in their 62 run loss.
