= Michael Johnson (cricketer) =

Australian cricketer

Personal information
- Full name: Michael Anthony Johnson
- Born: 11 July 1988 (age 38); Perth, Western Australia
- Batting: Right-handed
- Role: Wicket-keeper

Domestic team information
- Years: Team
- 2008/09–2011/12: Western Australia
- 2013: Worcestershire (squad no. 33)

Career statistics
Competition	FC	LA	T20
Matches	20	8	2
Runs scored	384	48	11
Batting average	13.24	9.50	11.00
100s/50s	0/1	0/0	0/0
Top score	53	17*	8*
Catches/stumpings	48/2	4/2	0/0
- Source: CricketArchive, 31 May 2020

Michael Anthony Johnson (born 11 August 1988) is an Australian cricketer who played for Western Australia and Worcestershire County Cricket Club.
