= Chris Matthews (cricketer) =

Australian cricketer (born 1962)

Personal information
- Full name: Christopher Darrell Matthews
- Born: 22 September 1962 (age 64); Cunderdin, Western Australia
- Batting: Left-handed
- Bowling: Left-arm fast

International information
- National side: Australia
- Test debut (cap 338): 14 November 1986 v England
- Last Test: 21 November 1988 v West Indies

Domestic team information
- Years: Team
- 1984/85–1990/91: Western Australia
- 1988: Lancashire
- 1991/92–1994/95: Tasmania

Career statistics
Competition	Test	First-class
Matches	3	100
Runs scored	54	2,146
Batting average	10.80	20.24
100s/50s	0/0	0/9
Top score	32	75
Balls bowled	750	21,058
Wickets	6	380
Bowling average	52.16	28.10
5 wickets in innings	0	22
10 wickets in match	0	0
Best bowling	3/106	8/101
Catches/stumpings	1/–	31/–
- Source: CricInfo, 25 May 2020

Christopher Darrell Matthews (born 22 September 1962) is a former Australian cricketer, who played for the Australian national cricket team, Western Australia, Lancashire County Cricket Club, and Tasmania. Matthews was a left arm fast bowler, recording a bowling average of 52.16 in Test and 28.1 in First-class cricket.

Matthews signed for Lancashire County Cricket Club in 1988, but only managed three matches for them. He returned to Western Australia, but failed to hold down a regular spot, and so moved to play for Tasmania in 1990, where he became highly successful, taking 119 wickets for them before retiring at the end of the 1994–95 season.
