= Ken MacLeay =

Australian cricketer

Cricket information
- Batting: Right-handed
- Bowling: Right-arm medium

International information
- National side: Australia
- ODI debut (cap 74): 31 January 1983 v New Zealand
- Last ODI: 26 January 1987 v England

Domestic team information
- Years: Team
- 1981/82–1991/92: Western Australia
- 1991–1992: Somerset

Career statistics
Competition	ODI	FC	LA
Matches	16	129	100
Runs scored	139	3750	929
Batting average	12.63	26.97	17.20
100s/50s	0/0	3/19	3/19
Top score	41	114*	43
Balls bowled	857	22122	4759
Wickets	15	300	116
Bowling average	41.73	30.26	26.10
5 wickets in innings	1	6	3
10 wickets in match	0	0	0
Best bowling	6/39	6/93	6/39
Catches/stumpings	2/–	79/–	28/–
- Source: CricInfo, 8 June 2007

Kenneth Hervey MacLeay (born 2 April 1959) is a former English-born Australian cricketer.

He was an all-rounder who played 16 One Day Internationals for Australia between 1983 and 1987. MacLeay played in the 1983 Cricket World Cup in England taking 6 for 39 against India.

MacLeay played in 129 first-class matches for Western Australia between 1981 and 1991. He was a regular in a strong WA team appearing in Sheffield Shield final winning team four times. MacLeay also played county cricket in England for Somerset in 1991 and 1992.

In 2001, MacLeay was named as a life member of the WACA Ground in Perth for his contributions to cricket.

== Career ==
In 1982–83 MacLeay leapt to attention when he took 5–7 off 21 balls for WA against Victoria.

=== International career ===
He made his one-day debut for Australia in 1982–83 against New Zealand, taking 1–39 and scoring 3. His next game was in the second final; Macleay scored 10 and took 1–56.

In March 1983 he starred for Australian in a special one-off one day match against New Zealand to raise funds to the bushfire victims. MacLeay took 1–42 with the ball and top scored in Australia's (unsuccessful) run chase, with 41 off 37 balls.

He was initially overlooked for selection on the 1983 World Cup but was later called up as a replacement.

He played the West Indies, taking 1–31 and scoring 1. He was kept in the team to play India, only making 4 with the bat but taking 6–39 with the ball. His returns against Zimbabwe were 9 and 0–45. In the second match against India he took 1–48 and scored 5.

Australia tried him in the one day team in 1983–84. In a game against Pakistan he went for 0–39. Against the West Indies his figures were 0–47 and 15. MacLeay was then dropped.

In 1986–87 he scored 114 against NSW.
