= Steve Magoffin =

Australian cricketer (born 1979)

Personal information
- Full name: Steven James Magoffin
- Born: 17 December 1979 (age 46); Corinda, Queensland, Australia
- Height: 1.94 m (6 ft 4 in)
- Batting: Left-handed
- Bowling: Right-arm fast-medium
- Role: Bowler

Domestic team information
- Years: Team
- 2004/05–2010/11: Western Australia
- 2007: Surrey
- 2008: Worcestershire
- 2011/12: Queensland
- 2012–2017: Sussex (squad no. 64)
- 2018: Worcestershire
- FC debut: 17 October 2004 WA v Tasmania
- LA debut: 15 October 2004 WA v Tasmania

Career statistics
Competition	FC	LA	T20
Matches	160	53	12
Runs scored	2,657	228	21
Batting average	16.60	20.72	10.50
100s/50s	0/5	0/0	0/0
Top score	79	24*	11*
Balls bowled	31,759	2,646	246
Wickets	597	66	9
Bowling average	23.60	31.57	40.44
5 wickets in innings	27	0	0
10 wickets in match	4	0	0
Best bowling	8/20	4/58	2/15
Catches/stumpings	35/–	12/–	3/–
- Source: CricketArchive, 1 September 2018

Steven James Magoffin (born 17 December 1979) is a former Australian cricketer, who most recently played for Worcestershire in English county cricket, and having previously played for Western Australia and Queensland in Australian domestic matches. He has also played county cricket as an overseas player for Surrey and Sussex.

A former Queensland Academy of Sport player, Magoffin made his debut for WA in 2004-05 where he played every Pura Cup in the season, finishing with 28 wickets at 35.10. He has a career-best haul of 8 for 20, playing for Sussex against Somerset in 2013. He played a few matches for Surrey in April and May, 2007 as a substitute for Matthew Nicholson.

In 2015, Magoffin applied for a UK passport, thus making him a naturalised UK player.

Magoffin retired at the end of the 2018 English cricket season.
