= Grade cricket =

Top cricket competition in each Australian state and territory

Grade cricket (also known as premier cricket) is the name of the senior inter-club or district cricket competitions in each of the Australian states and territories. The term may refer to:

- Victorian Premier Cricket
- NSW Premier Cricket
- Queensland Premier Cricket
- Western Australian Premier Cricket
- South Australian Premier Cricket
- Darwin & District Grade Cricket
- ACT Premier Cricket

== See also ==
- Australian national cricket team
- Australia national women's cricket team
- Cricket in Australia
- The Grade Cricketer
