= WA Cricket =

Sport governing body in Western Australia

- Sport: Cricket
- Founded: 1885; 141 years ago
- Affiliation: Cricket Australia
- Headquarters: WACA Ground
- Location: East Perth, Western Australia
- Chairperson: Avril Fahey
- CEO: John Stephenson

Official website
- www.wacricket.com.au
- (Western Australia)
- (Australia)

WA Cricket (officially known as the Western Australian Cricket Association or WACA) is the governing body for cricket in Western Australia.

The WACA was formed on 5 November 1885. In 1893, the association opened the WACA Ground.

== Elite cricket ==
WA Cricket is responsible for managing Western Australia's first-class cricket male team in the Sheffield Shield and Marsh Cup and female team in the Women's National Cricket League (WNCL).

In the Big Bash League and Women's Big Bash League, the state is represented by the Perth Scorchers and Perth Scorchers (Women) respectively.

== Competitions ==
WA Cricket is responsible for administering Western Australian Premier Cricket.

The Association formerly hosted a popular annual cricket festival at Lilac Hill in Guildford between a Chairman's XI and the visiting International XI team. The first match in 1990 drew a crowd of 12,000 to watch the hosts play the England XI. The last of these was held in 2009 due to the difficulty in scheduling matches of this type in international team tours.

== Affiliations ==
WA Cricket is affiliated with Cricket Australia.

== See also ==
- Cricket in Western Australia
