= Western Australian Premier Cricket =

Semi-professional cricket competition

Western Australian Premier Cricket is a club cricket competition played at a level below the first-class Western Warriors and other state teams. The competition is administered by the Western Australian Cricket Association. It is the premier club cricket competition in Western Australia and players vying for Western Warriors and national team selection are typically chosen from Premier Cricket competition clubs. Retiring international and first-class players wishing to continue playing will generally return to their original Premier Cricket club. There are currently 16 teams in the competition.

== History ==
1st Grade clubs compete for the 'Alcohol.Think Again District Cricket Competition Shield'.

The First Grade minor premiers win the 'Kevin Sullivan Silver Cup' as well as a cash prize of $3000.

== Western Australian Premier Cricket Clubs ==
=== Western Australian Premier Cricket Club Teams (Current) ===
Colours	Name	Nickname	Debut(s) & Grade(s)	Location	Home ground(s)	Coach	Captain	Last Tile(s)+
	Bayswater- Morley^{[a]}	Bears	1933–34 (2nd, 3rd); 1947–48 (1st)	Bayswater	Hillcrest Reserve	Ben Williams	Liam O'Connor	1998–99
	Claremont- Nedlands^{[b]}	Tigers	1898–99 (All Grades)	Nedlands	Cresswell Park; Melvista Oval	Jim Allenby	Nick Hobson	2019–20
	Fremantle^{[c]}	Port Boys	1887–88 (All Grades)	Fremantle	Stevens Reserve	Joe Piromalli	Brayden Sutton	1990–91
	Gosnells	Hawks	1987–88 (All Grades)	Southern River	Sutherlands Park	Luis Reece	-	-
	Joondalup^{[d]}	Centurions	1885–86 (All Grades)	Iluka	Iluka Sports Complex	Mike Smith	Jaron Morgan	2014–15
	Melville	Storm	1957–58 (2nd, 3rd); 1960–61 (4th); 1968–69 (1st)	Alfred Cove	Tompkins Park	Brad Thompson	Sean Terry	2004–05
	Midland- Guildford	Swans	1946–47 (All Grades)	Caversham	Lilac Hill Park	James Godfrey	Keaton Critchell	1993–94
	Mount; Lawley^{[e]}	Hawks	1924–25 (All Grades)	Dianella	Breckler Park	David Virgo	Stewart Walters	1992–93
	Perth^{[f]}	Demons	1862 (All Grades)	Carlisle	Fletcher Park	Jason Thompson	Jonathan Wells	2023–24
	Rockingham- Mandurah	Mariners	1995–96 (2nd, 3rd); 1996–97 (1st)	Secret Harbour	Lark Hill Sports Complex	Craig Simmons	Teague Wyllie	2015–16
	Scarborough	Gulls	1957–58 (2nd, 3rd, 4th); 1969–70 (1st)	Scarborough	Abbett Park	Wes Robinson	Nicholas Maiolo	2009–10
	South; Perth^{[g]}	Sky Blues	1930–31 (All Grades)	South Perth	Richardson Park	Bret Mulder	Hugh Brown	1996–97
	Subiaco- Floreat^{[h]}	Lions	1907–08 (All Grades)	Floreat	Floreat Oval; Alderbury St. Reserve	Wayne Clark	Geremy Fatouros	2021–22
	Wanneroo	Roos	1979–80 (2nd, 3rd, 4th); 1983–84 (1st)	Madeley	Kingsway Reserve	Joel Charles	Christian Smith	2020–21
	Willetton^{[i]}	Dragons	1889–90 (All Grades)	Willetton	Burrendah Reserve	Aaron Harwood	Cameron Bancroft	-
	University of West. Aust.	Students	1885–86 (All Grades)	Crawley	James Oval; UWA Sports Ground	Will Stibbs	Will Bosisto	2024–25

- DCC = District Cricket Club

+ Last Title/s in 1st Grade

Notes

^{a} Bayswater-Morley was known as the Bassendean Cricket Club between 1932–33 and 1947–48, the Bassendean Turf Cricket Club from 1947–48 to 1960–61 and the Bassendean-Bayswater Cricket Club from 1960–61 to 1980–81.
^{b} Claremont-Nedlands was formed in 1989 from a merger of the Claremont-Cottesloe and Nedlands Cricket Clubs. The Claremont-Cottesloe Cricket Club, founded in 1898, was known as the Claremont Cricket Club between 1906 and 1948. The Nedlands Cricket Club was founded in 1928.
^{c} Fremantle Cricket Club first competed in the competition in the 1887–88 season. The club withdrew from the competition several times to participate in local competitions, but fielded a team in the WACA competition from 1887–88 to 1888–89, 1890–91 to 1893–94, 1906–07 to 1908–09, 1910–11 to 1913–14, and from 1921–22 onwards. The club combined with Claremont for three seasons from 1942–43 to 1944–45 during the Second World War.
^{d} Joondalup was known as the North Perth Cricket Club before 1999–2000.
^{e} Mount Lawley was known as the Maylands-Mount Lawley Cricket Club between 1924–25 and 1927–28.
^{f} Perth was known as the Metropolitans Cricket Club between 1885–86 and 1898–99, the East Perth Cricket Club between 1899–1900 and 1907–08, and again from 1910–11 to 1953–54, and as the Corinthians Cricket Club 1908–09 to 1909–10.
^{g} South Perth participated in the competition from 1930–31 to 1934–35, in 1941–42 and from 1945–46 onwards.
^{h} Subiaco-Floreat was formed from a merger of the Subiaco and Floreat Park Cricket Clubs in 1977–78. The Subiaco Cricket Club was founded in 1907–08 as the Subiaco-Leederville Cricket Club, changing its name to Subiaco in 1942–43. The Floreat Park was founded in 1957–58, but only played 2nd Grade cricket.
^{i} The West Perth Cricket Club (formed in 1889 as Federal CC and known as West Perth from 1890 to 1891) merged with South Suburban C.A. club Willetton (formed in 1973) in late 1982, effective from the 1983–84 season. The merged entity became known as the Southern Districts Cricket Club from 1983–84 to 1987–88. Willetton's SSCA arm broke away prior to the 1987–88 season and changed their name to the Willetton Senior Cricket Club, whilst Southern Districts became the Willetton District Cricket Club in 1988–89.

=== Western Australian Premier Cricket Club Teams (Former) ===
Former clubs include:

- Australians
- CBC
- Central
- City Temperance
- East Fremantle
- Henley Park
- High School
- I'Zingari
- Karrakatta Which won the Western Australian cricket premiership in both of its first two years of existence in the late 1890s.
- Maylands
- North-East Fremantle
- North Fremantle
- Perth Boys School
- Port
- Richmond
- South Fremantle
- North Perth
- Wanderers

== Associated competitions ==
- Alcohol.Think Again Premier Cricket Competition (First Grade)
- Second Grade
- Third Grade
- Fourth Grade
- Ted Hussey Shield (Under 17)
- Tony Mann Shield - formerly John McGuire Shield (Under 15)
- Graham McKenzie Shield (Under 14)
- John Inverarity Shield (Under 13)
- One Day League (formerly the Sunday League)
- District Premier Twenty20
- WADCC Statewide Twenty20
- Colts Twenty20 (an Under 21 Knockout Competition)
- Female A Grade
- Female B Grade
- Female Youth

== See also ==
- Western Australian Cricket Association
- Grade cricket
- Cricket in Western Australia
