= Australian Domestic One-Day Cricket Final =

The Australian Domestic One-Day Cricket Final is the last match in the domestic List A Limited overs cricket series in Australia. The competition has had many names since its inception; since 2024-25 it has been known as the Dean Jones Trophy.

Under the current competition format, the final is played at the home ground of the team that finishes the regular competition in first place. Under previous competition formats, the final has been played at the home ground of the finalist with the best record in the competition to that point or, in the very early years, at a neutral venue.

== Vehicle & General Australasian Knock-out Competition ==
1969–70 Final
1 January 1970
Scorecard

Victoria; 129 (34.6 overs)	v	New Zealand; 4/130 (31.4 overs)
Les Joslin 29 (?); Bob Cunis 3/26 (8 overs)		Bevan Congdon 69 (133); Alan Thomson 2/44 (8 overs)

New Zealand won by 6 wickets
Melbourne Cricket Ground, Melbourne
Attendance: 14,238
Player of the match: Bevan Congdon (NZ)

- Victoria won the toss and elected to bat.
- 1970-71: Queensland v Western Australia at Melbourne – 6 February 1971
  - Western Australia 170 (John Inverarity 90, Tony Dell 2-18) (38.2 ov)
  - Queensland 79 (Phil Carlson 23, Graham McKenzie 4-13) (23.5 ov)
    - Western Australia won by 91 runs
    - Player of the Match: John Inverarity (WA)
    - Crowd 5,595

== Coca-Cola Australasian Knock-out Competition ==
- 1971-72: South Australia v Victoria at Adelaide – 6 February 1972
  - South Australia 190 (Ian Chappell 82, Greg Chappell 59, Jim Higgs 3-25, Robert Rowan 3-35) (38.7 ov)
  - Victoria 2-192 (Bill Lawry 108, Keith Stackpole 52, Jeff Hammond 1-41) (33.4 ov)
    - Victoria won by 8 wickets
    - Player of the Match: Bill Lawry (Vic)
    - Crowd 9,189
- 1972-73: Queensland v New Zealand at Brisbane – 21 January 1973
  - New Zealand 9-170 (Bevan Congdon 75, Geoff Dymock 2-18) (35 ov)
  - Queensland 132 (Phil Carlson 33, Bob Cunis 3-15, David O'Sullivan 3-29) (31.3 ov)
    - New Zealand won by 38 runs
    - Player of the Match: Bevan Congdon (NZ)
    - Crowd 7,049

== Gillette Cup ==
- 1973-74: New Zealand v Western Australia at Melbourne – 3 February 1974
  - New Zealand 150 (John Morrison 50, Graham McKenzie 3-20, Wayne Clark 3-38) (36.3 ov)
  - Western Australia 3-151 (Wally Edwards 54, Bevan Congdon 2-31) (26.6 ov)
    - Western Australia won by 7 wickets
    - Player of the Match: Graham McKenzie (WA)
- 1974-75: New Zealand v Western Australia at Melbourne – 2 February 1975
  - Western Australia 76 (Rob Langer 40, Richard Collinge 4-20, Ewen Chatfield 3-5) (26.1 ov)
  - New Zealand 2-77 (Bevan Congdon 40*, Dennis Lillee 2-27) (17 ov)
    - New Zealand won by 8 wickets
    - Player of the Match: Richard Collinge (NZ)
    - Crowd 4,462
- 1975-76: Western Australia v Queensland at Perth – 8 February 1976
  - Queensland 7-236 (Greg Chappell 61, Martin Kent 61, Dennis Lillee 3-41) (40 ov)
  - Western Australia 232 (Ian Brayshaw 52, Dennis Lillee 32 (20), Greg Chappell 3-38) (39 ov)
    - Queensland won by 4 runs
    - Player of the Match: Greg Chappell (Qld)
    - Crowd 11,134
- 1976-77: Victoria v Western Australia at Melbourne – 23 January 1977
  - Victoria 164 (Paul Hibbert 38, Dennis Lillee 2-30, Mick Malone 2-34) (37.3 ov)
  - Western Australia 9-165 (Mick Malone 47*, Alan Hurst 3-31) (39.3 ov)
    - Western Australia won by 1 wicket
    - Player of the Match: Mick Malone (WA)
    - Crowd 32,908
- 1977-78: Western Australia v Tasmania at Perth – 5 February 1978
  - Tasmania 9-184 (Roger Woolley 56, Terry Alderman 4-40, John Inverarity 3-19) (40 ov)
  - Western Australia 3-185 (Graeme Wood 108*, Jack Simmons 1-33) (37.1 ov)
    - Western Australia won by 7 wickets
    - Player of the Match: Graeme Wood (WA)
    - Crowd 13,753
- 1978-79: Tasmania v Western Australia at TCA Ground, Hobart – 14 January 1979
  - Tasmania 6-180 (Jack Simmons 55*, Trevor Docking 46*, Graeme Porter 2-29) (50 ov)
  - Western Australia 133 (Craig Serjeant 47, Jack Simmons 4-17, Anthony Benneworth 3-14) (45 ov)
    - Tasmania won by 47 runs
    - Player of the Match: Jack Simmons (Tas)
    - Crowd 10,822

== McDonald's Cup ==
- 1979-80: Victoria v New South Wales at Melbourne – 25 November 1979
  - New South Wales 8-198 (Doug Walters 59*, Shaun Graf 2-34) (50 ov)
  - Victoria 6-199 (Julien Wiener 64, Graeme Beard 2-36) (47.4 OV)
    - Victoria won by 4 wickets
    - Player of the Match: Julien Wiener (Vic)
    - Crowd 20,604
- 1980-81: Queensland v Western Australia at Brisbane – 22 February 1981
  - Queensland 9-188 (Kepler Wessels 53, Martin Kent 41, Dennis Baker 2-37) (48 ov)
  - Western Australia 116 (Craig Serjeant 28, Carl Rackemann 2-11) (32.5 ov)
    - Queensland won by 72 runs
    - Player of the Match: Martin Kent (Qld)
    - Crowd 20,043
- 1981-82: New South Wales v Queensland at Sydney – 7 March 1982
  - Queensland 8-224 (Wayne Broad 85, Geoff Lawson 2-33) (47 ov)
  - New South Wales 197 (Peter Toohey 66, Geoff Dymock 5-27) (44.4 ov)
    - Queensland won by 27 runs
    - Player of the Match: Wayne Broad (Qld)
    - Crowd 5,549
- 1982-83: Western Australia v New South Wales at Perth – 20 March 1983
    - Match abandoned without a ball bowled
- 1982-83 Replay: Western Australia v New South Wales at Perth – 8 October 1983
  - New South Wales 6-195 (Dirk Wellham 65*, David Boyd 2-29) (50 ov)
  - Western Australia 6-198 (Kim Hughes 61, Greg Shipperd 54, Geoff Lawson 2-27) (49.1 ov)
    - Western Australia won by 4 wickets
    - Crowd 9,179
- 1983-84: South Australia v Western Australia at Adelaide – 4 March 1984
  - South Australia 6-256 (Don O'Connor 96*, Ken MacLeay 2-25) (49 ov)
  - Western Australia 9-248 (Rod Marsh 54, Ian Carmichael 4-50) (49 ov)
    - South Australia won by 8 runs
    - Player of the Match: Don O'Connor (SA)
- 1984-85: New South Wales v South Australia at Sydney – 16 February 1985
  - New South Wales 7-278 (John Dyson 79, Peter Clifford 69, Dirk Wellham 51, Wayne Prior 3-53) (50 ov)
  - South Australia 190 (Michael Haysman 44, Greg Matthews 3-29) (45.5 ov)
    - New South Wales won by 88 runs
    - Player of the Match: Dirk Wellham (NSW)
    - Crowd 11,782
- 1985-86: Victoria v Western Australia at Melbourne – 9 March 1986
  - Western Australia 2-129 (Mike Veletta 67*) (26.2 ov); Victoria Did not bat
    - Match Abandoned
    - Crowd 9,370
- 1985-86 Replay: Victoria v Western Australia at Melbourne – 10 March 1986
  - Western Australia 167 (Wayne Andrews 71, Denis Hickey 5-26) (38 ov)
  - Victoria 148 (Dav Whatmore 34, Graeme Porter 3-28) (36.5 ov)
    - Western Australia won by 19 runs
    - Player of the Match: Denis Hickey (Vic)
    - Crowd 3,065
- 1986-87: Tasmania v South Australia at TCA Ground, Hobart – 15 March 1987
  - South Australia 6-325 (Glenn Bishop 116, Wayne B. Phillips 75 (43), Allister de Winter 3-84) (50 ov)
  - Tasmania 9-239 (Danny Buckingham 56, Tim May 3-50) (50 ov)
    - South Australia won by 86 runs
    - Player of the Match: Glenn Bishop (SA)
- 1987-88: New South Wales v South Australia at Sydney – 27 March 1988
  - New South Wales 7-219 (Trevor Bayliss 44, Darryl Scott 3-41) (50 ov)
  - South Australia 6-196 (Peter Sleep 48*, Steve Waugh 2-37) (50 ov)
    - New South Wales won by 23 runs
    - Player of the Match: Graham Smith (NSW)
    - Crowd 6,180

== FAI Cup ==
- 1988-89: Victoria v Queensland at Melbourne – 19 March 1989
  - Queensland 4-253 (Allan Border 77* (56), Greg Ritchie 60, Merv Hughes 1-49) (50 ov)
  - Victoria 90 (Damien Fleming 18*, Carl Rackemann 3–9, Dirk Tazelaar 3-18, John Maguire 3-30) (32.4 ov)
    - Queensland won by 163 runs
    - Player of the Match: Allan Border (Qld)
- 1989-90: Western Australia v South Australia at Perth – 31 March 1990
  - South Australia 87 (Michael Bevan 23*, Terry Alderman 4-14) (34.5 ov)
  - Western Australia 3-88 (Geoff Marsh 29*, Colin Miller 2-42) (19.1 ov)
    - Western Australia won by 7 wickets
    - Player of the Match: Terry Alderman (WA)
    - Crowd 11,675
- 1990-91: Western Australia v New South Wales at Perth – 27 October 1990
  - New South Wales 7-235 (Michael Bevan 74*, Bruce Reid 2-34) (50 ov)
  - Western Australia 3-236 (Geoff Marsh 91*, Mike Veletta 61*, Mark McPhee 58, Mark Waugh 1-26) (44.5 ov)
    - Western Australia won by 7 wickets
    - Player of the Match: Geoff Marsh (WA)
    - Crowd 11,294
- 1991-92: Western Australia v New South Wales at Perth – 26 October 1991
  - New South Wales 9-199 (Mark Taylor 50, Bruce Reid 3-35) (50 ov)
  - Western Australia 130 (Damien Martyn 54, Wayne Holdsworth 2-14) (40.1 ov)
    - New South Wales won by 69 runs
    - Player of the Match: Mark Taylor (NSW)
    - Crowd 10,825

== Mercantile Mutual Cup ==
- 1992-93: New South Wales v Victoria at Sydney – 20 February 1993
  - Victoria 186 (Paul Nobes 41, Brad McNamara 3-27) (50 ov)
  - New South Wales 6-187 (Michael Bevan 64*, Michael Slater 54, Darren Lehmann 1-26)
    - New South Wales won by 4 wickets
    - Player of the Match: Brad McNamara (NSW)
    - Crowd 11,070
- 1993-94: New South Wales v Western Australia at Sydney – 12 March 1994
  - New South Wales 4-264 (Richard Chee Quee 131, Michael Bevan 77, Damien Martyn 2-31) (50 ov)
  - Western Australia 9-218 (Justin Langer 65, Tim Zoehrer 61 (48), Brad McNamara 2-39) (49 ov)
    - New South Wales won by 43 runs (revised target)
    - Player of the Match: Richard Chee Quee (NSW)
    - Player of the Series: Stuart Law (Qld)
    - Crowd 6,136
- 1994-95: Victoria v South Australia at Melbourne – 5 March 1995
  - South Australia 169 (Darren Webber 47, Jason Bakker 4-15, Troy Corbett 4-30) (46.4 ov)
  - Victoria 6-170 (Matthew Elliott 46*, Joe Scuderi 3-36) (44.5 ov)
    - Victoria won by 4 wickets
    - Player of the Match: Troy Corbett (Vic)
    - Crowd 11,167
- 1995-96: Queensland v Western Australia at Brisbane – 3 March 1996
  - Western Australia 166 (Tom Moody 40, Geoff Foley 3-34, Scott Prestwidge 3-39) (49.1 ov)
  - Queensland 6-167 (Trevor Barsby 50, Brendon Julian 3-46) (44.5 ov)
    - Queensland won by 4 wickets
    - Player of the Match: Trevor Barsby (Qld)
    - Crowd 8,597
- 1996-97: Western Australia v Queensland at Perth – 2 March 1997
  - Queensland 148 (Geoff Foley 34*, Mark Atkinson 3-33) (40.1 ov)
  - Western Australia 2-149 (Ryan Campbell 50 (45), Scott Prestwidge 1-16) (35 ov)
    - Western Australia won by 8 wickets
    - Player of the Match: Ryan Campbell (WA)
    - Crowd 13,399
- 1997-98: New South Wales v Queensland at Sydney – 1 March 1998
  - New South Wales 166 (Phil Emery 38, Andy Bichel 3-25, Scott Prestwidge 3-25) (49.3 ov)
  - Queensland 8-167 (Scott Prestwidge 42*, Shane Lee 2-27) (47.5 ov)
    - Queensland won by 2 wickets
    - Player of the Match: Scott Prestwidge (Qld)
    - Crowd 11,164
- 1998-99: Victoria v New South Wales at Melbourne – 28 February 1999
  - Victoria 231 (Ian Harvey 57 (54), Mark Higgs 2-33) (50 ov)
  - New South Wales 192 (Michael Bevan 55, Paul Reiffel 2-30) (45.3 ov)
    - Victoria won by 39 runs
    - Player of the Match: Ian Harvey (Vic)
    - Player of the Series: Matthew Hayden (Qld)
- 1999-2000: Western Australia v Queensland at Perth – 27 February 2000
  - Western Australia 6-301 (Ryan Campbell 108 (85), Simon Katich 43, Michael Kasprowicz 2-59) (50 ov)
  - Queensland 256 (Jimmy Maher 102 (90), Martin Love 73, Jo Angel 3-49) (45.2 ov)
    - Western Australia won by 45 runs
    - Player of the Match: Brad Hogg (WA)
    - Player of the Series: Matthew Hayden (Qld)
    - Crowd 11,893
- 2000-01: Western Australia v New South Wales at Perth – 25 February 2001
  - Western Australia 7-272 (Mike Hussey 84* (68), Tom Moody 78, Shane Lee 2-39) (50 ov)
  - New South Wales 4-276 (Michael Bevan 135* (137), Michael Clarke 57, Duncan Spencer 2-57) (48.2 ov)
    - New South Wales won by 6 wickets
    - Player of the Match: Michael Bevan (NSW)
    - Players of the Series: Darren Lehmann (SA) and Sean Young (Tas)

== ING Cup ==
- 2001-02: Queensland v New South Wales at Brisbane – 24 February 2002
  - New South Wales 204 (Brad Haddin 45, Nathan Hauritz 4-47, James Hopes 3-33) (50 ov)
  - Queensland 185 (Martin Love 53, Shawn Bradstreet 4-23, Dominic Thornely 3-36) (48.5 ov)
    - New South Wales won by 19 runs
    - Player of the Match: Dominic Thornely (NSW)
    - Player of the Series: Darren Lehmann (SA)
    - Crowd 12,005
- 2002-03: Western Australia v New South Wales at Perth – 23 February 2003
  - Western Australia 207 (Peter Worthington 49*, Stuart Clark 3-34) (49.5 ov)
  - New South Wales 3-211 (Steve Waugh 88 (55), Simon Katich 75*, Brad Williams 3-55) (26.5 ov)
    - New South Wales won by 7 wickets
    - Player of the Match: Stuart Clark (NSW)
    - Player of the Series: Justin Langer (WA)
- 2003-04: Queensland v Western Australia at Brisbane – 29 February 2004
  - Queensland 244 (Clinton Perren 57, Stuart Law 50, Kade Harvey 4-28) (49.1 ov)
  - Western Australia 6-248 (Scott Meuleman 71, Kade Harvey 53* (42), Nathan Hauritz 2-55) (49.4 ov)
    - Western Australia won by 4 wickets
    - Player of the Match: Kade Harvey (WA)
    - Player of the Series: Brad Hodge (Vic)
    - Crowd 13,092
- 2004-05: Queensland v Tasmania at Brisbane – 20 February 2005
  - Queensland 7-246 (Jimmy Maher 104, Craig Philipson 56, Adam Griffith 2-37) (50 ov)
  - Tasmania 3-247 (Daniel Marsh 67*, Michael Dighton 57, Ashley Noffke 1-47) (47.1 ov)
    - Tasmania won by 7 wickets
    - Player of the Match: Jimmy Maher (Qld)
    - Player of the Series: James Hopes (Qld)
    - Crowd 12,357
- 2005–06: South Australia v New South Wales at Adelaide – 26 February 2006
  - South Australia 154 (Mark Cosgrove 49, Aaron Bird 3-30) (43.5 ov)
  - New South Wales 9-155 (Corey Richards 35, Shaun Tait 6-41) (40.4 ov)
    - New South Wales won by 1 wicket
    - Player of the Match: Shaun Tait (SA)
    - Player of the Series: Mark Cosgrove (SA)
    - Crowd 8,404

== Ford Ranger Cup ==
- 2006–07: Victoria v Queensland at Melbourne - 25 February 2007
  - Queensland 5-274 (Jimmy Maher 108, Clinton Perren 75, Darren Pattinson 2-49) (50 ov)
  - Victoria 9-253 (Andrew McDonald 65*, David Hussey 62, Aaron Nye 3-55) (50 ov)
    - Queensland won by 21 runs
    - Player of the Match: Jimmy Maher (Qld)
    - Player of the Series: Matthew Elliott (SA)
    - Crowd c. 5,000
- 2007–08: Tasmania v Victoria at Hobart - 23 February 2008
  - Victoria 158 (David Hussey 50, Andrew McDonald 35, Xavier Doherty 4-18) (37.3 ov)
  - Tasmania 9-132 (Travis Birt 38, Dane Anderson 25, Bryce McGain 3-11) (30.1 ov)
    - Tasmania won by 1 wicket (D-L Method)
    - Player of the Match: Brett Geeves (Tas)
    - Player of the Series: Matthew Elliott (SA)
    - Crowd 5,063
- 2008–09: Queensland v Victoria at Melbourne - 22 February 2009.
  - Queensland 8-187 (Chris Hartley 49*, Glen Batticciotto 40, Shane Harwood 2-23, Damien Wright 2-31) (50 ov)
  - Victoria 175 (Rob Quiney 52, Adam Crosthwaite 29, Nathan Rimmington 4-40, Ben Laughlin 3-25) (48 ov)
    - Queensland won by 12 runs
    - Player of the Match: Nathan Rimmington (Qld)
    - Player of the Series: Shane Harwood (Vic)
- 2009–10: Victoria v Tasmania at Melbourne - 28 February 2010.
  - Tasmania 6-304 (Tim Paine 100, Michael Dighton 80, Ed Cowan 61, Andrew McDonald 3-60, John Hastings 2-67) (50 ov)
  - Victoria 194 (Andrew McDonald 64, Matthew Wade 40, Gerard Denton 5-45, Xavier Doherty 2-43) (42.1 ov)
    - Tasmania won by 110 runs
    - Player of the Match: Tim Paine (Tas)
    - Player of the Series: Brad Hodge (Vic)
    - Crowd: 3,296

== Ryobi Cup ==
2010–2011 Final
27 February 2011
Scorecard

(home team) Victoria; 194 (36.4 overs)	v	Tasmania; 109 (31.1 overs)
Brad Hodge 61 (69); James Faulkner 4/20 (5.4 overs)		Ed Cowan 32* (68); Dirk Nannes 3/29 (10 overs)

Victoria won by 84 runs (D/L Method)
Melbourne Cricket Ground, Melbourne
Umpires: Simon Fry and Paul Reiffel
Player of the match: Dirk Nannes (Victoria)

- Tasmania won the toss and elected to field.
- Victoria won the 2010–11 Ryobi One-Day Cup

2011–2012 Final
25 February 2012
Scorecard

(home team) South Australia; 285 (49.4 overs)	v	Tasmania; 4/285 (50 overs)
Michael Klinger 81 (105); James Faulkner 4/75 (12 overs)		George Bailey 101 (105); Nathan Lyon 3/86 (13 overs)

Match tied
Adelaide Oval, Adelaide
Umpires: Paul Reiffel and John Ward
Player of the match: George Bailey (Tasmania)

- South Australia won the toss and elected to bat.
- South Australia won the 2011–12 Ryobi One-Day Cup due to more points accumulated in the round robin tournament.

2012–2013 Final
27 February 2013
14:15 (D/N)
Scorecard

Queensland; 9/146 (32/32 overs)	v	Victoria (home team); 144 (31.4/32 overs)
Jason Floros 47 (32); Clint McKay 2/24 (8 overs)		Peter Handscomb 42 (50); Ryan Harris 4/26 (7.4 overs)

Queensland won by 2 runs (D/L)
Melbourne Cricket Ground, Melbourne
Umpires: Simon Fry and John Ward
Player of the match: Ryan Harris (Queensland)

- Victoria won the toss and elected to field
- Match reduced to 32 overs per side
- Queensland won the 2012–13 Ryobi One-Day Cup

2013–2014 Final
27 October 2013
Scorecard

(home team) New South Wales; 6/317 (50 overs)	v	Queensland; 5/319 (49.1 overs)
Nic Maddinson 76 (74); James Hopes 3/64 (10 overs)		Usman Khawaja 104 (100); Doug Bollinger 2/53 (10 overs)

Queensland won by 5 wickets
North Sydney Oval, Sydney
Umpires: Simon Fry and John Ward
Player of the match: Usman Khawaja (Queensland)

- Queensland won the toss and elected to field.
- Queensland won the 2013–14 Ryobi One-Day Cup

== Matador BBQs One-Day Cup ==
2014–2015 Final
26 October 2014
14:00 (D/N)
Scorecard

Western Australia; 6/255 (50 overs)	v	New South Wales; 191 (44.1 overs)
Michael Klinger 96 (122); Gurinder Sandhu 2/38 (10 overs)		Shane Watson 83 (100); Jason Behrendorff 5/27 (8.1 overs)

Western Australia won by 64 runs
Sydney Cricket Ground
Umpires: Simon Fry (Aus) and John Ward (Aus)
Player of the match: Michael Klinger (Western Australia)

- Western Australia won the toss and elected to bat
- Western Australia won the 2014–15 Matador BBQs One-Day Cup

2015–2016 Final
25 October 2015
10:00
Scorecard

South Australia; 221 (46.3 overs)	v	New South Wales; 223/1 (29.5 overs)
Tom Cooper 105 (119); Josh Hazlewood 3/28 (9.3 overs)		Ed Cowan 88 (78); Kane Richardson 1/58 (7 overs)

New South Wales won by 9 wickets
North Sydney Oval, Sydney
Umpires: Mick Martell and John Ward
Player of the match: Josh Hazlewood (New South Wales)

- New South Wales won the toss and elected to field.
- New South Wales won the 2015–16 Matador BBQs One-Day Cup

2016–2017 Final
23 October 2016
9:30
Scorecard

Queensland; 186 (46.5 overs)	v	New South Wales; 4/188 (43.1 overs)
Usman Khawaja 35 (52); Nathan Lyon 4/10 (10 overs)		Moisés Henriques 85 (103); Michael Neser 3/20 (9 overs)

New South Wales won by 6 wickets
North Sydney Oval, Sydney
Umpires: Mick Martell and Paul Wilson
Player of the match: Nathan Lyon (New South Wales)

- New South Wales won the toss and elected to field.
- New South Wales won the 2016–17 Matador BBQs One-Day Cup

== JLT One-Day Cup ==
2017–2018 Final
21 October 2017
14:00 (D/N)
Scorecard

South Australia; 9/248 (50 overs)	v	Western Australia; 4/250 (43.4 overs)
Tom Cooper 63 (84); Andrew Tye 2/43 (10 overs)		Mitchell Marsh 80* (80); Kane Richardson 1/47 (8.4 overs)

Western Australia won by 6 wickets
Blundstone Arena, Hobart
Umpires: Sam Nogajski and Paul Wilson
Player of the match: Mitchell Marsh (Western Australia)

- South Australia won the toss and elected to bat.
- Western Australia won the 2017–18 JLT One-Day Cup

2018–2019 Final
10 October 2018
10:30
Scorecard

Victoria; 274 (50 overs)	v	Tasmania; 164 (40.4 overs)
Cameron White 88 (96); Gurinder Sandhu 7/56 (10 overs)		Alex Doolan 46 (73); Andrew Fekete 2/20 (6 overs)

Victoria won by 110 runs
Junction Oval, St Kilda
Umpires: Paul Wilson and Sam Nogajski
Player of the match: Peter Handscomb (Victoria)

- Victoria won the toss and elected to bat.
- Victoria won the 2018–19 JLT One-Day Cup
- Gurinder Sandhu (Tasmania) took a hat-trick in Victoria's innings dismissing Matthew Short, Fawad Ahmed and Andrew Fekete in consecutive deliveries.

== Marsh One-Day Cup ==
2019–2020 Final
26 November 2019
10:00
Scorecard

Queensland; 205 (49.3 overs)	v	Western Australia; 6/210 (48.0 overs)
Jimmy Peirson 79 (83); Jhye Richardson 3/35 (10 overs)		Shaun Marsh 101* (132); Mark Steketee 2/32 (10 overs)

Western Australia won by 4 wickets
Allan Border Field, Brisbane
Umpires: Gerard Abood and Shawn Craig
Player of the match: Shaun Marsh (Western Australia)

- Western Australia won the toss and elected to field.
- Western Australia won the 2019–20 Marsh One-Day Cup

2020–2021 Final
11 April 2021
9:30
Scorecard

New South Wales; 8/251 (50 overs)	v	Western Australia; 149 (40.3 overs)
Jack Edwards 108 (122); Jason Behrendorff 3/46 (10 overs)		Cameron Green 36 (55); Sean Abbott 4/23 (7 overs)

New South Wales won by 102 runs
Bankstown Oval, Sydney
Umpires: Gerard Abood and Shawn Craig
Player of the match: Jack Edwards (New South Wales)

- New South Wales won the toss and elected to bat.
- New South Wales won the 2020–21 Marsh One-Day Cup

2021–2022 Final
11 March 2022
9:35
Scorecard

Western Australia; 225/9 (50 overs)	v	New South Wales; 207 (46.3 overs)
Jhye Richardson 44 (64); Adam Zampa 3/40 (10 overs)		Moises Henriques 43 (75); Andrew Tye 4/30 (8 overs)

Western Australia won by 18 runs
Junction Oval, Melbourne
Umpires: Michael Graham Smith and Phillip Gillespie
Player of the match: Andrew Tye (Western Australia)

- Western Australia won the toss and elected to bat.
- Western Australia won the 2021-22 Marsh One-Day Cup

2022–2023 Final
8 March 2023
12.05
Scorecard

Western Australia; 7/387 (50 overs)	v	South Australia; 206 (31.4 overs)
Josh Inglis 138 (110); Wes Agar 2/56 (10 overs)		Henry Hunt 50 (55); Ashton Agar 5/64 (9.4 overs)

Western Australia won by 181 runs
WACA Ground, Perth
Umpires: Gerard Abood and Sam Nogajski
Player of the match: Josh Inglis (Western Australia)

- South Australia won the toss and elected to field.
- Western Australia won the 2022–23 Marsh One-Day Cup

2023–2024 Final
25 February 2024
Scorecard

New South Wales; 169 (42 overs)	v	Western Australia; 5/170 (33.2 overs)
Oliver Davies 51 (53); Joel Paris 4/21 (9 overs)		Hilton Cartwright 73* (80); Jack Edwards 1/22 (6 overs)

Western Australia won by 5 wickets
Cricket Central, Sydney
Umpires: Shawn Craig and Sam Nogajski
Player of the match: Hilton Cartwright (Western Australia)

- Western Australia won the toss and elected to field.
- Western Australia won the 2023-24 Marsh One-Day Cup

== Dean Jones Trophy ==
2024–2025 Final
1 March 2025
Scorecard

South Australia; 7/268 (50 overs)	v	Victoria; 204 (43.3 overs)
Harry Nielsen 68 (93); Peter Siddle 3/40 (10 overs)		Will Sutherland 50 (52); Henry Thornton 4/27 (9.3 overs)

South Australia won by 64 runs
Adelaide Oval, Adelaide
Umpires: Donovan Koch and Sam Nogajski
Player of the match: Henry Thornton (South Australia)

- Victoria won the toss and elected to field.
- South Australia won the 2024-25 Dean Jones Trophy
