= Australian cricket team in New Zealand in 1997–98 =

International cricket tour

The Australia national cricket team toured New Zealand in February 1998 and played a four-match series of Limited Overs Internationals (LOI) against the New Zealand national cricket team which was drawn 2–2. New Zealand were captained by Stephen Fleming and Australia by Steve Waugh.

== One Day Internationals (ODIs) ==
The series was tied 2-2.

=== 1st ODI ===
8 February 1998 (D/N)
Scorecard

| New Zealand; 212/7 (50 overs) | v | Australia; 215/3 (38.2 overs) |
| LG Howell 50 (63); GR Robertson 3/32 (10 overs) | | AC Gilchrist 118 (117); CD McMillan 2/38 (6.2 overs) |

Australia won by 7 wickets
Lancaster Park, Christchurch
Umpires: DB Cowie and DM Quested
Player of the match: AC Gilchrist (AUS)

- New Zealand won the toss and elected to bat.

=== 2nd ODI ===
10 February 1998
Scorecard

| Australia; 297/6 (50 overs) | v | New Zealand; 231 (47.3 overs) |
| ME Waugh 85 (112); SB O'Connor 3/55 (9 overs) | | CL Cairns 67 (76); MG Bevan 3/54 (10 overs) |

Australia won by 66 runs
Basin Reserve, Wellington
Umpires: DM Quested and EA Watkin
Player of the match: ME Waugh (AUS)

- Australia won the toss and elected to bat.

=== 3rd ODI ===
12 February 1998 (D/N)
Scorecard

| Australia; 236 (48.4 overs) | v | New Zealand; 240/3 (48.2 overs) |
| DS Lehmann 44 (55); CL Cairns 5/42 (7.4 overs) | | SP Fleming 111* (137); P Wilson 1/42 (6.2 overs); AJ Bichel 1/42 (10 overs) |

New Zealand won by 7 wickets
McLean Park, Napier
Umpires: BF Bowden and EA Watkin
Player of the match: SP Fleming (NZ)

- Australia won the toss and elected to bat.

=== 4th ODI ===
14 February 1998
Scorecard

| New Zealand; 223/7 (50 overs) | v | Australia; 193 (49.1 overs) |
| CZ Harris 55 (57); GR Robertson 3/29 (10 overs) | | AC Gilchrist 42 (40); SB Doull 4/25 (8 overs) |

New Zealand won by 30 runs
Eden Park, Auckland
Umpires: BF Bowden and RS Dunne
Player of the match: CZ Harris (NZ)

- Australia won the toss and elected to field.
