= Brad McNamara =

Australian cricketer (born 1965)

Personal information
- Full name: Bradley Edward McNamara
- Born: 30 December 1965 (age 60); Sydney, New South Wales
- Nickname: Buzzard
- Batting: Right-handed
- Bowling: Right-arm medium
- Role: All-rounder

Career statistics
Competition	First-class	List A
Matches	59	47
Runs scored	2,195	473
Batting average	27.78	18.19
100s/50s	2/11	0/2
Top score	137*	65*
Balls bowled	6,591	2,176
Wickets	116	60
Bowling average	26.82	23.41
5 wickets in innings	5	1
10 wickets in match	0	0
Best bowling	6/43	6/25
Catches/stumpings	35/–	14/–
- Source: CricketArchive, 11 January 2013

Bradley Edward McNamara (born 30 December 1965) is a former Australian cricketer who played for New South Wales during the late 1980s and early 1990s. Born in Sydney, McNamara was a right-handed bowling all-rounder, and played for the Australian national under-19 cricket team before playing for New South Wales. In 1999, at the end of his career, he also appeared in a single limited-overs match for the Middlesex Cricket Board.

== First-class career ==
McNamara was an all-rounder for the NSW Blues in Australian domestic cricket for over a decade. When without injuries he was a regular selection for the Blues, particularly in one-day teams.

As a medium pace bowler, his strength was his ability to worry batsmen with a combination of accuracy and unpredictability. Off a relatively short run, he combined good line and length with difficult to read "change-up" balls, swing and seam.

McNamara was the "man of the match" in his first List A match for New South Wales.

While not noted for big hitting, his hard working and stubborn approach to batting made him a key member of many Blues tail-end partnerships. He still jointly holds the Blues first-class tenth wicket partnership record against Tasmania, an unbroken 138-run stand with Phil Alley. McNamara retired from interstate competition at the end of the 1999–2000 season.

== Channel Nine ==
After his retirement from cricket, McNamara went to work for Channel Nine, becoming their Executive Producer of cricket.

On 6 July 2016, it was announced that McNamara was leaving the network after 17 years. McNamara was quoted as saying "it’s time for him to do something else"

== Personal life ==
McNamara was best man at Australian captain Steve Waugh's wedding. He played rhythm guitar, lead guitar and supplied backing vocals for Six & Out, a cricket-themed rock band composed of Blues teammates Gavin Robertson, Richard Chee Quee and Shane and Brett Lee.
