= 1994–95 Sheffield Shield season =

Australian cricket tournament

- Cricket format: First-class
- Tournament format(s): Double round-robin & Final
- Champions: Queensland (1st title)
- Participants: 6
- Matches: 31
- Player of the series: Dean Jones (Victoria)
- Most runs: Dean Jones (Victoria (1216)
- Most wickets: Carl Rackemann (Queensland) (52)

The 1994–95 Sheffield Shield season was the 93rd season of the Sheffield Shield, the domestic first-class cricket competition of Australia.

Queensland, after 63 years of competition, won the Shield for the first time after having previously finished runners-up on 11 occasions.

== Table ==
Team	Played	Won	Lost	Tied	Drawn	N/R	Points
Queensland	10	6	3	0	1	0	38
South Australia	10	6	1	0	3	0	38
Victoria	10	5	4	0	1	0	33.1
Western Australia	10	4	5	0	1	0	27.7
New South Wales	10	2	8	0	3	0	16.8
Tasmania	10	2	4	0	4	0	15.8

== Final ==
March 24–28 1995
Scorecard

South Australia	v	Queensland (H)
214 (81.4 overs); Jamie Brayshaw 53 (111); Tim Nielsen 53 (128); Carl Rackemann 3/54 (18 overs)		664 (199.5 overs); Trevor Barsby 151 (277); Martin Love 146 (283); Allan Border 98 (182); Jason Gillespie 3/112 (35 overs)
349 (121.2 overs); Paul Nobes 100 (273); Paul Jackson 3/81 (37.2 overs)

Queensland won by an innings and 101 runs
Venue: The Gabba, Brisbane
Umpires: Darrell Hair and Peter Parker

- South Australia won the toss and elected to bat.
