= Belsak (surname) =

Belsak is a surname. Notable people with the surname include:

- Andy Belsak (born 1971), Australian cricketer
- Matjaz Belsak (born 1992), Slovenian strongman and powerlifter
