= Ian Carmichael (disambiguation) =

Ian Carmichael (1920–2010) was an English actor.

Ian Carmichael may also refer to:

- Ian Carmichael (cricketer) (born 1960), English cricketer
- Ian Carmichael (musician) (born 1960), Scottish sound engineer
- Ian S. E. Carmichael (1930–2011), British-born American geologist
