= Darren Wates =

Australian cricketer (born 1977)

Personal information
- Full name: Darren Jude Wates
- Born: 2 July 1977 (age 49); Subiaco, Western Australia
- Nickname: Watesy
- Height: 1.87 m (6 ft 2 in)
- Batting: Right-handed
- Bowling: Right arm fast-medium
- Role: All-rounder

Domestic team information
- Years: Team
- 1999/00–2007/08: Western Australia
- FC debut: 9 December 1999 Western Australia v Queensland
- Last FC: 6 December 2007 Western Australia v Tasmania
- LA debut: 27 October 1999 Western Australia v Pakistanis
- Last LA: 19 December 2007 Western Australia v South Australia

Career statistics
Competition	FC	LA	T20
Matches	15	50	1
Runs scored	491	323	–
Batting average	35.07	21.53	–
100s/50s	0/3	0/0	–
Top score	99	44*	–
Balls bowled	2,235	2,451	12
Wickets	35	52	0
Bowling average	39.94	38.48	–
5 wickets in innings	0	0	–
10 wickets in match	0	0	–
Best bowling	4/77	3/27	–
Catches/stumpings	6/–	8/–	1/–
- Source: CricketArchive, 25 September 2008

Darren Jude Wates (born 2 July 1977) is an Australian former cricketer who played first-class and limited overs cricket for Western Australia.

Wates attended Aquinas College, Perth and the University of Western Australia. He started his career in the 1999–2000 season, in which he won the best new talent award on the way to the Western Warriors winning the Mercantile Mutual Cup Final.

In 2004, he gave away his career as a lawyer to become a full-time cricketer, but injuries have restricted his last few seasons, with persistent hamstring problems.

In the 2004 ING Cup Final, Wates starred with Kade Harvey to add 75 for the seventh wicket to guide the Western Warriors to their first title since 1999–2000. Wates hit the winning runs off the bowling of Clinton Perren in the final over of the match.
