= List of international cricket centuries by David Warner =

David Warner international centuries

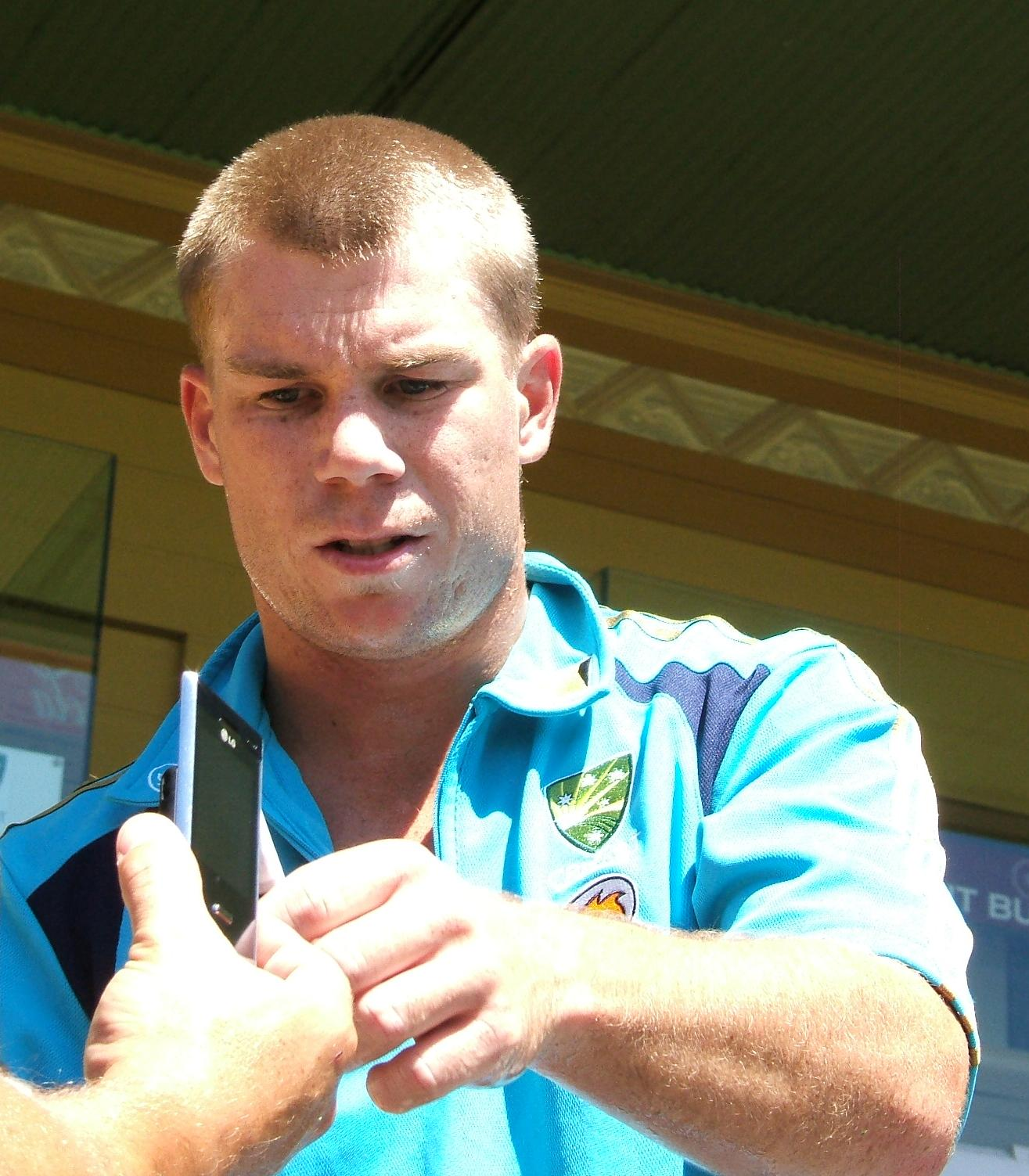
David Warner has scored 49 international centuries for Australia.

David Warner is an Australian international cricketer and former captain of the Australian national team in limited overs cricket. A left-handed opening batsman, Warner is well known for his "aggressive" batting style. As of December 2023, he has scored 49 centuries—26 in Tests, 22 in One Day Internationals (ODIs) and 1 in Twenty20 Internationals (T20Is)—for Australia. This is the most by any opener in international cricket.

Warner made his Test debut against New Zealand in December 2011 and scored his first century (123 not out) in the second match of the series held at the Bellerive Oval. He carried the bat in the fourth innings of the match, which Australia lost by seven runs. He followed that with a 69-ball century in the third match of the home series against India in January 2012. It was the joint-fourth fastest in terms of balls faced at the time. (Note: Warner had levelled West Indian cricketer Shivnarine Chanderpaul's record. As of January 2020, it is the fastest century by an opener and sixth fastest overall in Tests.) In January 2017, while playing against Pakistan at the Sydney Cricket Ground, he became the fifth cricketer—and the first in Australia—to score a century before lunch on the first day of a Test match. (Note: The others being Victor Trumper, Charlie Macartney, Don Bradman and Majid Khan.) His highest score of 335 not out was made against Pakistan at the Adelaide Oval in November 2019. Warner is one of three batsmen to score centuries in both innings of a Test match on three occasions. (Note: The other two are India's Sunil Gavaskar and Australia's Ricky Ponting.) In December 2022, he scored 200 in his hundredth Test match, becoming the second Australian (Note: The first was Ricky Ponting.) to score a century in his hundredth Test, and the second overall to score a double century. (Note: The first was Joe Root.) Among all countries, Warner has scored the most Test centuries (six) against Pakistan.

Warner scored his first ODI century in 2012, three years after his debut, when he made 163 against Sri Lanka in the first of three finals of the 2011–12 Commonwealth Bank Series. His 178 against Afghanistan in the 2015 World Cup was at the time the highest score by an Australian in the tournament's history. The following year, he scored seven centuries, (Note: In terms of most ODI centuries made by a player in a calendar year, Warner is behind Sachin Tendulkar (nine in 1998) and is joint-second with Sourav Ganguly (seven in 2000).) including a career-high score of 179 against Pakistan. On 28 September 2017, he played in his 100th ODI and became the first batsman for Australia and 8th batsman overall to score a century in his 100th ODI. His seven scores in excess of 150 in ODIs is second only to India's Rohit Sharma's eight. Among all countries, Warner has scored the most ODI centuries (five) against South Africa. Warner scored a man of the match innings of 89 in his T20I debut against South Africa in January 2009. His highest score in this format of 100 not out was made against Sri Lanka at the Adelaide Oval in October 2019.

As of November 2025, Warner ranks eleventh on the list of players who have scored the most centuries in international cricket.

== Key ==
- * – Remained not out
- † – Man of the match

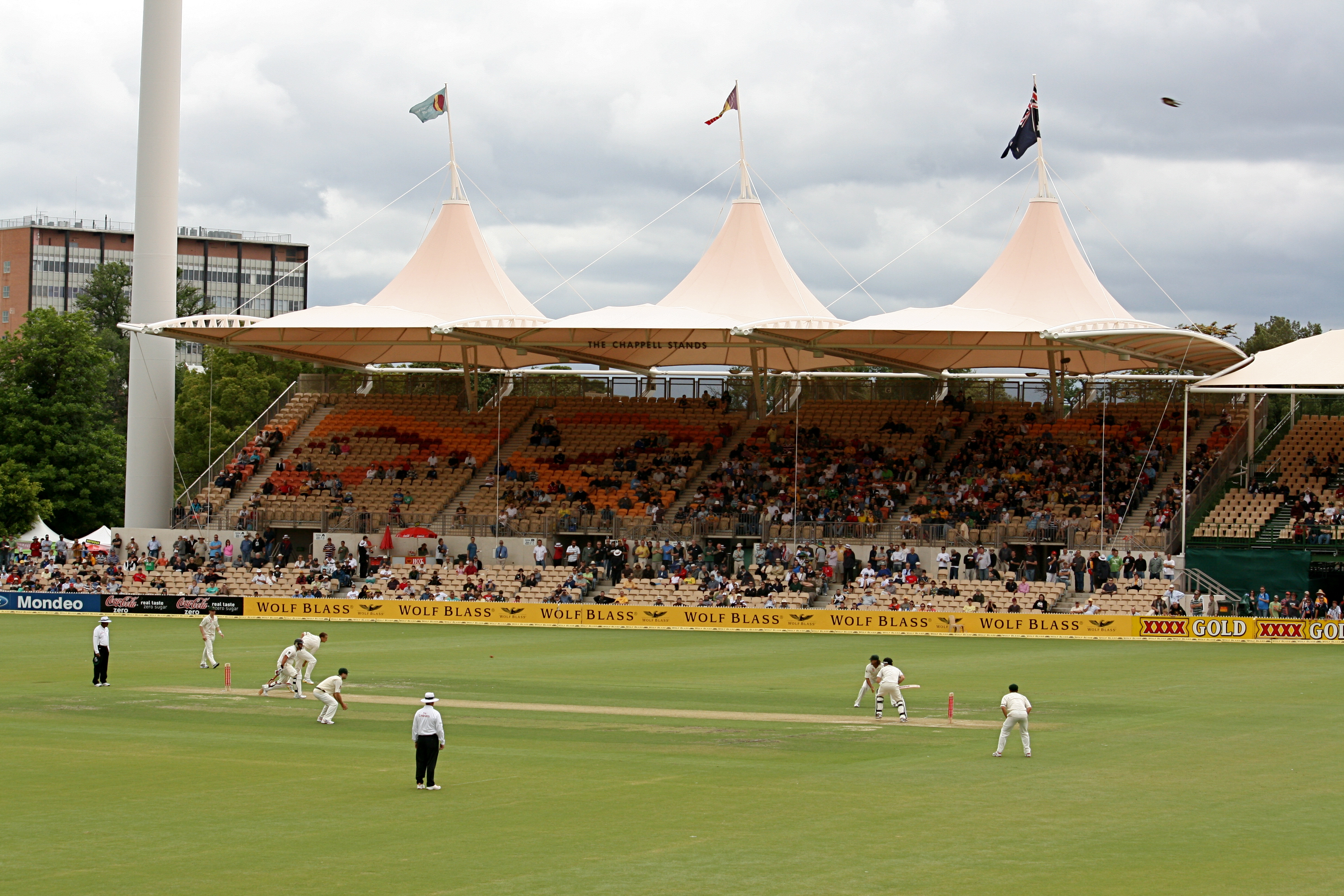
Adelaide Oval, where Warner has scored centuries in all three formats of the game.

== Test centuries ==
Test centuries scored by David Warner
No.	Score	Against	Pos.	Inn.	Test	Venue	H/A/N	Date	Result	Ref
1	123* †	New Zealand	2	4	2/2	Bellerive Oval, Hobart	Home	9 December 2011	Lost	
2	180 †	India	2	2	3/4	WACA Ground, Perth	Home	13 January 2012	Won	
3	119	South Africa	1	1	2/3	Adelaide Oval, Adelaide	Home	22 November 2012	Drawn	
4	124	England	2	3	1/5	The Gabba, Brisbane	Home	21 November 2013	Won	
5	112	England	2	3	3/5	WACA Ground, Perth	Home	13 December 2013	Won	
6	115	South Africa	2	3	1/3	SuperSport Park, Centurion	Away	12 February 2014	Won	
7	135 †	South Africa	2	1	3/3	Newlands Cricket Ground, Cape Town	Away	1 March 2014	Won	
8	145 †	South Africa	2	3	3/3	Newlands Cricket Ground, Cape Town	Away	1 March 2014	Won	
9	133	Pakistan	2	2	1/2	Dubai International Cricket Stadium, Dubai	Neutral	22 October 2014	Lost	
10	145	India	2	1	1/4	Adelaide Oval, Adelaide	Home	9 December 2014	Won	
11	102	India	2	3	1/4	Adelaide Oval, Adelaide	Home	9 December 2014	Won	
12	101	India	2	1	4/4	Sydney Cricket Ground, Sydney	Home	6 January 2015	Drawn	
13	163 †	New Zealand	2	1	1/3	The Gabba, Brisbane	Home	5 November 2015	Won	
14	116 †	New Zealand	2	3	1/3	The Gabba, Brisbane	Home	5 November 2015	Won	
15	253	New Zealand	2	1	2/3	WACA Ground, Perth	Home	13 November 2015	Drawn	
16	122* †	West Indies	1	2	3/3	Sydney Cricket Ground, Sydney	Home	3 January 2016	Drawn	
17	144	Pakistan	2	2	2/3	Melbourne Cricket Ground, Melbourne	Home	26 December 2016	Won	
18	113 †	Pakistan	2	1	3/3	Sydney Cricket Ground, Sydney	Home	3 January 2017	Won	
19	112	Bangladesh	1	4	1/2	Sher-e-Bangla National Cricket Stadium, Dhaka	Away	27 August 2017	Lost	
20	123	Bangladesh	2	2	2/2	Zohur Ahmed Chowdhury Stadium, Chittagong	Away	4 September 2017	Won	
21	103	England	2	1	4/5	Melbourne Cricket Ground, Melbourne	Home	26 December 2017	Drawn	
22	154	Pakistan	1	2	1/2	The Gabba, Brisbane	Home	21 November 2019	Won	
23	335* †	Pakistan	1	1	2/2	Adelaide Oval, Adelaide	Home	29 November 2019	Won	
24	111*	New Zealand	1	3	3/3	Sydney Cricket Ground, Sydney	Home	3 January 2020	Won	
25	200 †	South Africa	1	2	2/3	Melbourne Cricket Ground, Melbourne	Home	26 December 2022	Won	
26	164	Pakistan	1	1	1/3	Perth Stadium, Perth	Home	14 December 2023	Won	

== One Day International centuries ==
ODI centuries scored by David Warner
No.	Score	Against	Pos.	Inn.	S/R	Venue	H/A/N	Date	Result	Ref
1	163 †	Sri Lanka	1	1	103.82	The Gabba, Brisbane	Home	4 March 2012	Won	
2	100	Sri Lanka	2	1	71.42	Adelaide Oval, Adelaide	Home	6 March 2012	Lost	
3	127	England	1	2	110.43	Sydney Cricket Ground, Sydney	Home	16 January 2015	Won	
4	178 †	Afghanistan	1	1	133.83	WACA Ground, Perth	Home	4 March 2015	Won	
5	122	India	2	1	107.54	Sydney Cricket Ground, Sydney	Home	23 January 2016	Lost	
6	109 †	South Africa	1	1	90.83	Warner Park, Basseterre	Neutral	11 June 2016	Won	
7	106 †	Sri Lanka	1	2	84.12	Pallekele Cricket Stadium, Kandy	Away	4 September 2016	Won	
8	117	South Africa	1	1	109.34	Kingsmead Cricket Ground, Durban	Away	5 October 2016	Lost	
9	173 †	South Africa	1	2	127.20	Newlands Cricket Ground, Cape Town	Away	12 October 2016	Lost	
10	119 †	New Zealand	1	1	103.47	Manuka Oval, Canberra	Home	6 December 2016	Won	
11	156 †	New Zealand	1	1	121.88	Melbourne Cricket Ground, Melbourne	Home	9 December 2016	Won	
12	130 †	Pakistan	2	1	109.24	Sydney Cricket Ground, Sydney	Home	22 January 2017	Won	
13	179 †	Pakistan	1	1	139.84	Adelaide Oval, Adelaide	Home	26 January 2017	Won	
14	124 †	India	1	1	104.20	M. Chinnaswamy Stadium, Bangalore	Away	28 September 2017	Won	
15	107 †	Pakistan	2	1	96.39	County Ground, Taunton	Neutral	12 June 2019	Won	
16	166 †	Bangladesh	1	1	112.92	Trent Bridge, Nottingham	Neutral	20 June 2019	Won	
17	122	South Africa	1	2	104.27	Old Trafford, Manchester	Neutral	6 July 2019	Lost	
18	128* †	India	1	2	114.28	Wankhede Stadium, Mumbai	Away	14 January 2020	Won	
19	106	England	1	2	103.92	Melbourne Cricket Ground, Melbourne	Home	22 November 2022	Won	
20	106	South Africa	1	1	113.97	Mangaung Oval, Bloemfontein	Away	9 September 2023	Won	
21	163 †	Pakistan	1	1	131.45	M. Chinnaswamy Stadium, Bangalore	Neutral	20 October 2023	Won	
22	104	Netherlands	2	1	111.82	Arun Jaitley Cricket Stadium, Delhi	Neutral	25 October 2023	Won	

== Twenty20 International centuries ==
T20I centuries scored by David Warner
No.	Score	Against	Pos.	Inn.	S/R	Venue	H/A/N	Date	Result	Ref
1	100* †	Sri Lanka	2	1	178.57	Adelaide Oval, Adelaide	Home	27 October 2019	Won	
