= Andy Belsak =

Australian cricketer (born 1971)

Andrew Belsak
Personal information
- Full name: Andrew John Belsak
- Born: 14 June 1971 (age 55); Launceston, Tasmania, Australia
- Batting: Right-handed
- Bowling: Right-arm medium

Domestic team information
- Years: Team
- 1994/1995: Tasmania

Career statistics
Competition	List A
Matches	1
Runs scored	2
Batting average	2.00
100s/50s	–/–
Top score	2
Balls bowled	–
Wickets	–
Bowling average	–
5 wickets in innings	–
10 wickets in match	–
Best bowling	–
Catches/stumpings	–/–
- Source: Cricinfo, 5 October 2011

Andrew John Belsak (born 14 June 1971) is a former Australian cricketer. Belsak was a right-handed batsman who bowled right-arm medium pace. He was born in Launceston, Tasmania.

Belsak played a single List A match for Tasmania against Victoria in the 1994–95 Mercantile Mutual Cup. He was dismissed for 2 runs by Troy Corbett, with Victoria winning by 78 runs.

== See also ==
- List of Tasmanian representative cricketers
