= Six & Out =

Australian rock band

- Origin: New South Wales, Australia
- Genres: Rock
- Years active: 1999–2005, 2023–present
- Labels: ABC; EMI; Shock
- Members: Richard Chee Quee; Brett Lee; Shane Lee; Brad McNamara; Gavin Robertson

Six & Out is an Australian rock band consisting of five former New South Wales first-class cricketers. Formed in 1999, the band released two studio albums and played around 300 gigs on the live music circuit until its dissolution in early 2005. Almost two decades later, Six & Out reunited at the request of Australian Prime Minister Anthony Albanese, and continued its reunion with a series of live shows across late 2023 and early 2024.

The band's name is derived from the backyard cricket rule of 'six and out', which specifies that if a player hits a ball for six that causes the ball to be lost, the player is automatically dismissed from further batting.

== History ==
The band's genesis developed midway through the 1990s, when cricketing teammates Brad McNamara and Shane Lee began practising guitar while on tour in the United Kingdom. Fellow cricketers Gavin Robertson—already an accomplished musician in his own right—and Richard Chee Quee were later joined by Brett Lee, who could not play any instruments at the time. In August 1999, a snippet in The Sun-Herald announced the launch of Six & Out's debut single "Be a Part of It" as the theme song for the New South Wales Blues cricket squad, from which all band members were active players.

The band found burgeoning success on the live music circuit and by February 2000 were performing to 2000-strong crowds in metropolitan Sydney. During the Australian winter, Six & Out entered the recording studio to craft an album of originals and covers, concluding recording by October that year in preparation for the release of their first single "Can't Bowl, Can't Throw". The single, which was released in 2000, peaked at number 100 on the ARIA singles chart and referenced the infamous cricket incident involving Shane Warne, Scott Muller and 'Joe the Cameraman' during the second Test between Australia and Pakistan at Bellerive Oval in 1999; Joe provided backing vocals on the song.

Six & Out launched its self-titled debut record on 13 November 2000 at One World Sport bar in Darling Harbour, much to the chagrin of Muller, who had launched an official complaint to the Australian Cricketers' Association head Tim May about the lead single's content. Six & Out was officially released one week later via ABC/EMI, and included guest appearances from cricketer Steve Waugh, sports commentator Ray Warren, and musician Daryl Braithwaite. The single "Can't Bowl, Can't Throw" was released on the same day.

After a year of solid touring, Six & Out released a follow-up recording in January 2002, a five-track extended play entitled Bring It On!. The EP featured vocals from the Screaming Jets singer Dave Gleeson and the Angels frontman Doc Neeson.

In 2023, Australian Prime Minister Anthony Albanese invited the band to reunite for a one-off performance. Having enjoyed the experience of performing together again, Six & Out announced an Australian tour commencing in January 2024.

On 19 January 2024, cricketer Glenn Maxwell was hospitalised following the Six & Out concert at The Gov, a popular live music venue in Adelaide. The concert was also attended by Australian captain Pat Cummins and other Test team members such as Steve Smith and Alex Carey Cricket Australia commenced an investigation into the incident. Maxwell was in Adelaide for a golf tournament.

== Members ==
- Richard Chee Quee – lead vocals
- Brett Lee – bass guitar, vocals
- Shane Lee – guitar, vocals
- Brad McNamara – guitar, vocals
- Gavin Robertson – drums, vocals

== Discography ==
=== Albums ===
List of albums, with selected details
| Title | Details |
|---|---|
| Six & Out | Released: 20 November 2000; Label: ABC, EMI; Formats: CD |

=== Extended plays ===
List of EPs, with selected details
| Title | Details |
|---|---|
| Bring It On! | Released: 14 January 2002; Label: Shock; Format: CD |

=== Singles ===
List of singles, with selected chart positions
| Title | Year | Peak chart positions | Album |
| Title | Year | AUS | Album |
|---|---|---|---|
| "Can't Bowl, Can't Throw" | 2000 | 100 | Six & Out |
| "Eleven" (featuring Steve Waugh) | 2001 | — | Six & Out |
| "Totally Average Band" (featuring Dave Gleeson) | 2002 | — | Bring It On! |
