= 1999–2000 Sheffield Shield season =

Australian cricket tournament

- Cricket format: First-class
- Tournament format(s): Double round-robin & Final
- Champions: Queensland (3rd title)
- Participants: 6
- Matches: 31
- Player of the series: Darren Lehmann (South Australia)
- Most runs: Matthew Elliott (Victoria) (1,028)
- Most wickets: Paul Reiffel (Victoria) (59)

The 1999–2000 Sheffield Shield season was the 98th season of the Sheffield Shield, the domestic first-class cricket competition of Australia. Queensland won the championship.

== Naming ==
In November 1999, the Australian Cricket Board (ACB) announced that the winner of the interstate first-class competition would be awarded the Pura Milk Cup, instead of the Sheffield Shield, under a sponsorship arrangement with National Foods.

== Table ==
Team	Played	Won	Lost	Tied	Drawn	N/R	Points
Queensland	10	8	1	0	1	0	48
Victoria	10	6	2	0	2	0	36
Western Australia	10	4	4	0	2	0	30
South Australia	10	3	5	0	2	0	24
Tasmania	10	2	4	0	4	0	18
New South Wales	10	1	8	0	1	0	6

== Final ==
17–21 March 2000
Scorecard

(H) Queensland	v	Victoria
285 (124.4 overs); Stuart Law 129 (330); Paul Reiffel 5/65 (29.4 overs)		182 (88.5 overs); Ian Harvey 50 (121); Andy Bichel 6/47 (27.5 overs)
343 (175.5 overs); Martin Love 100 (288); Paul Reiffel 4/65 (40 overs)		1/31 (17.1 overs); Matthew Elliott 14* (52); Adam Dale 1/21 (8.1 overs)

Match Drawn, Queensland won by virtue of topping regular season ladder
Venue: Allan Border Field, Brisbane
Umpires: Darrell Hair and Steve Davis
Player of the match: Stuart Law (Queensland)

- Queensland won the toss and elected to bat.

== Statistics ==
=== Most runs ===
Player	Team	Mat	Inns	NO	Runs	Ave	HS	100	50
Matthew Elliott	Victoria	10	19	4	1028	68.53	183*	4	4
Darren Lehmann	South Australia	9	18	1	995	58.52	149	6	1
Ryan Campbell	Western Australia	10	18	0	885	49.16	203	2	5
Michael Hussey	Western Australia	10	18	1	874	51.41	172*	3	3
Jason Arnberger	Victoria	11	22	2	869	43.45	214	2	5

=== Most wickets ===
Player	Team	Mat	Inns	Overs	Wkts	Ave	Econ	BBI	BBM	5	10
Paul Reiffel	Victoria	11	20	425.2	59	16.64	2.30	5/65	9/130	1	0
Andy Bichel	Queensland	11	21	403.4	53	18.66	2.45	6/45	10/92	2	1
Brad Williams	Western Australia	10	19	365.4	50	23.02	3.14	6/74	9/114	5	0
Michael Kasprowicz	Queensland	6	11	202.3	42	11.64	2.41	5/32	10/88	4	1
Paul Wilson	South Australia	10	20	394.1	38	25.18	2.42	5/71	7/134	1	0
