= Kade Harvey =

Australian cricketer

Personal information
- Full name: Kade Murray Harvey
- Born: 7 October 1975 (age 51); Subiaco, Western Australia
- Batting: Right-handed
- Bowling: Right-arm medium
- Role: All-rounder

Domestic team information
- Years: Team
- 1994/95–2004/05: Western Australia
- FC debut: 16 March 1995 Western Australia v Victoria
- Last FC: 19 December 2004 Western Australia v South Australia
- LA debut: 3 February 1995 Western Australia v New South Wales
- Last LA: 11 February 2005 Western Australia v Queensland

Career statistics
Competition	First-class	List A
Matches	27	86
Runs scored	740	829
Batting average	24.66	21.81
100s/50s	1/2	0/2
Top score	100*	53*
Balls bowled	3,867	3,776
Wickets	60	115
Bowling average	35.35	21.81
5 wickets in innings	0	0
10 wickets in match	0	0
Best bowling	4/63	4/8
Catches/stumpings	18/–	14/–
- Source: CricketArchive, 12 October 2011

Kade Murray Harvey (born 7 October 1975) is a former Australian cricketer who played first-class cricket for Western Australia. He was an all-rounder who bowled right-arm medium and batted in the lower order. Outside of cricket he is a qualified pharmacist.

Having represented Western Australia at under-17 level and under-19, Harvey was invited to join the Australian Cricket Academy. He went on to play a couple of games for the national Under-19s team in a game against an Indian youth team in early 1995.

Later that year he made his debut for Western Australia, playing first-class and limited overs matches for them. He soon became earmarked as a specialist one-day player and won the "Best New Talent" award after the Mercantile Mutual Cup season of 1996–97. He had taken 18 one day domestic wickets that season which equaled the competition record. He won the man of the match award in the final of the 2003–04 ING Cup, taking 4 wickets for 28 runs and scoring 53 runs from 42 balls in a 75 run unbeaten partnership with Darren Wates to win the game for the Western Australia.

He made just the one first class hundred, an innings of 100 not out against Tasmania at Bellerive Oval in 2004.
