= Michael Bevan Medal =

- Awarded for: Player of the match in One-Day Cup final
- Country: Australia
- First award: 2025
- Currently held by: Kurtis Patterson (2026)

The Michael Bevan Medal is awarded to the player of the match in the One-Day Cup final in Australian domestic cricket. Named after former Australian international cricketer, Michael Bevan, the medal was minted and first awarded in 2025.

== History ==
The Michael Bevan Medal was created as a result of an initiative from Cricket Australia to re-name the One-Day Cup after a legend of one-day cricket in Australia, in the lead up to the 2024-25 season. The process included a fan vote but the final decision was decided and ratified by the Cricket Australia board, following a recommendation from the Australian Cricket Hall of Fame. Bevan received the third most votes in the fan vote, and while the One-Day Cup trophy was named after Dean Jones, Bevan was honoured with the player of the match award being named after him.

Henry Thornton of South Australia was the inaugural recipient of the award in the 2025 One-Day Cup final, as South Australia won the first Dean Jones Trophy.

== Winners ==
The list of winners of the Michael Bevan Medal is as follows:

Year	Winner	State
2025	Henry Thornton	South Australia
2026	Kurtis Patterson	New South Wales

== See also ==
- One-Day Cup (Australia)
