= Hunter Poon =

Australian cricketer (1894–1980)

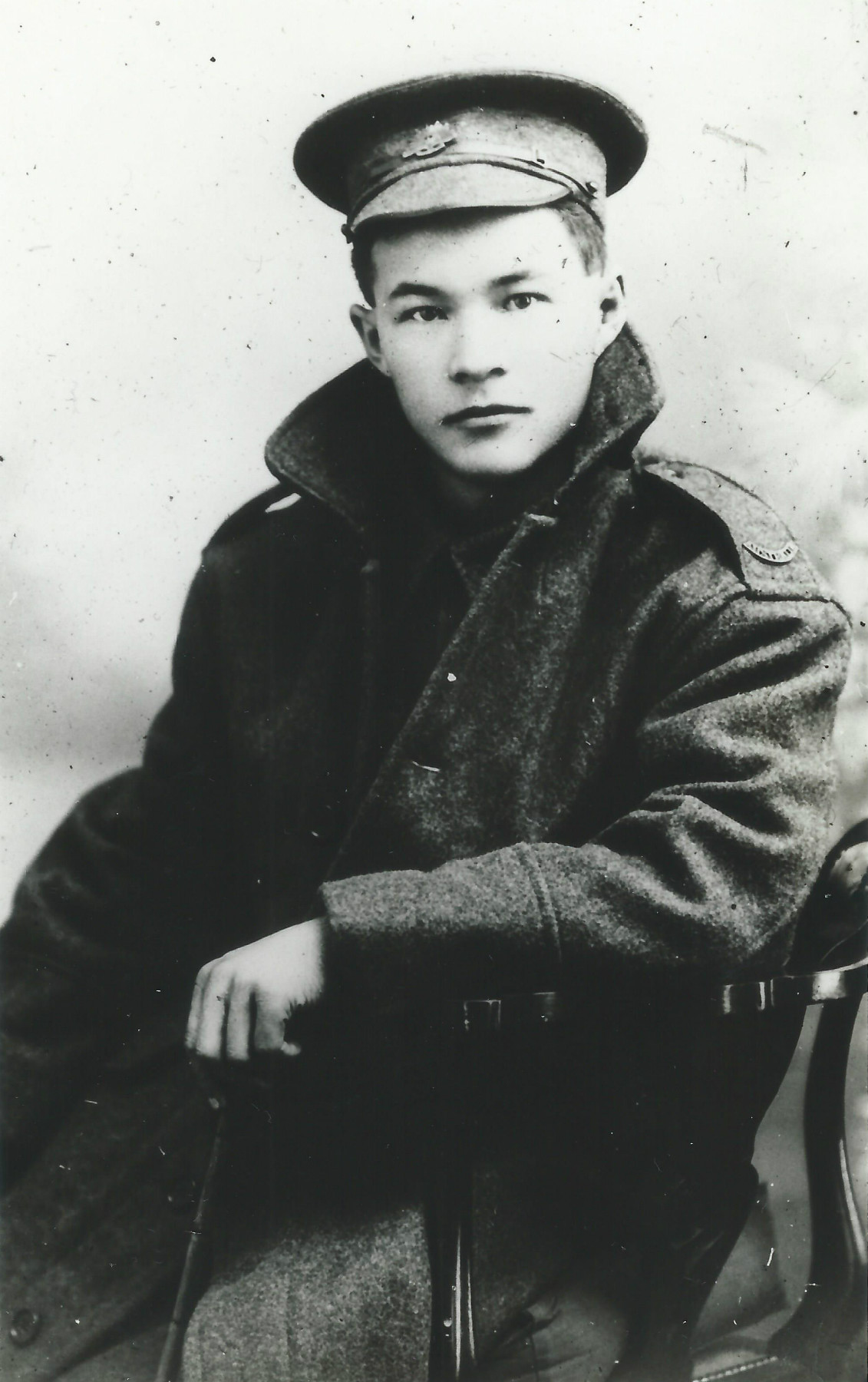
- Poon during World War I

Personal information
- Full name: Hunter Robert George Poon
- Born: 14 May 1894; Ballina, New South Wales, Australia
- Died: 25 January 1980 (aged 85); Greenslopes, Queensland, Australia
- Batting: Right-handed
- Role: Right arm leg spin

Domestic team information
- Years: Team
- 1923: Queensland
- First-class debut: 21 December 1923 Queensland v Victoria
- Last First-class: 1923 Queensland v Victoria

Career statistics
Competition	First-class
Matches	1
Runs scored	12
Batting average	6.00
100s/50s	0/0
Top score	10
Balls bowled	0
Wickets	-
Bowling average	-
5 wickets in innings	-
10 wickets in match	-
Best bowling	-
Catches/stumpings	7/0
- Source: CricketArchive, 21 September 2008

Hunter Robert George Poon (14 May 1894 – 25 January 1980) was an Australian cricketer and the first player of Chinese descent to appear in Australian first-class cricket.

== Biography ==
Hunter Robert George Poon was born near Ballina, New South Wales to a Cantonese man, William ("Lam") Poon, who had migrated to Australia to work on the north Queensland goldfields, and his half Chinese, half Anglo-Australian wife, Elizabeth (née Key). Hunter Poon's name appears on his birth certificate as Ander Leppit George Poon as the clerk registering his birth could not understand his father's accent. Poon moved with his family to Toowoomba, Queensland and was educated at Toowoomba Grammar School, becoming a school teacher after graduation. A right arm leg spin bowler and right-handed batsman, Poon became a leading cricketer around Toowoomba.

His career was interrupted by World War I, and Poon enlisted in the Australian Imperial Force on 5 September 1916, serving as a Lance Corporal with the 15th Battalion in France, where he was injured.

Returning from the war, with shrapnel wounds in his right hand and lower back, Poon continued to star in Toowoomba cricket and was chosen to represent Queensland in a first-class match against Victoria at the Melbourne Cricket Ground starting 21 December 1923. While Poon was unable to take a wicket and scored only 10 and two, his selection caused international headlines.

Although Poon never again played first-class cricket, he did play against the touring Marylebone Cricket Club twice. Representing Toowoomba, Poon played against MCC in December 1924, taking 0/19 and, batting at number four, scoring 11 and 0. In February 1933, during the Bodyline series, Poon represented Queensland Country against MCC in Toowoomba, taking 2/123 and 0/23 and scoring one with the bat. Poon took the Wickets of Herbert Sutcliffe, stumped by future Test wicket keeper Don Tallon, and Gubby Allen.

Poon died in Greenslopes, Brisbane in 1980, aged 85. The second cricketer of Chinese background to play first-class cricket in Australia, Richard Chee Quee, would not make his first-class debut until 1993.

== See also ==
- Richard Chee Quee
