= Benson & Hedges Challenge =

Cricket tournament

- Administrator: Australian Cricket Board
- Format: One Day International
- Tournament format: Quadrangular round robin followed by a final
- Number of teams: Australia; England; Pakistan; West Indies
- Current champion: England
- Most runs: (Australia) Dean Jones (227)
- Most wickets: (Pakistan) Wasim Akram (8)

The Benson and Hedges Challenge (also known as The Perth Challenge by non-commercial broadcasters such as ABC Local Radio) was a one-off one-day international cricket tournament played at the WACA Ground in Perth, Western Australia from 30 December 1986 to 7 January 1987 as part of the 1987 America's Cup Festival of Sport.

The tournament was won by England who defeated Pakistan by 5 wickets in the final. West Indies and host nation Australia also took part.

== The tournament and the America's Cup ==
This tournament saw the first matches played under floodlights at the WACA Ground with four of the seven matches being day/night games. In addition, the pitch square had been relaid prior to the 1985–86 season and had a full year to settle. The seating areas had been redeveloped with concourse seating installed and a new two-tier grandstand was under construction at the Swan River end of the ground.

The team uniforms for the tournament were based on the official shirts for the 1986-87 America's Cup being held concurrently in Fremantle. Each team's main colour made up the bottom half of the shirt, their secondary colour made up the top half and a white stripe surrounded the shirt over the chest. The official logo of the tournament was based on a 12-metre class yacht with a white cricket ball half doubling as the spinnaker.

Prize money for the tournament was $3,000 for winning and $1,500 for losing in the group stage, $10,000 for finishing runners-up and $20,000 for winning the tournament, making a total of $61,000.

Television coverage was provided by the Nine Network, while commercial free radio broadcasts were provided by ABC Local Radio.

== Uniforms ==
Australia
Australia kit

England
England kit

Pakistan
Pakistan kit

West Indies
West Indies kit

== Playing squads ==
=== Australia ===
Allan Border (captain), Glenn Bishop, David Boon, Simon Davis, Dean Jones, Craig McDermott, Ken MacLeay, Geoff Marsh, Greg Matthews, Simon O'Donnell, Bruce Reid, Steve Waugh, Mike Whitney, Tim Zoehrer

=== England ===
Mike Gatting (captain), Bill Athey, Ian Botham, Chris Broad, Phillip DeFreitas, Graham Dilley, Phil Edmonds, John Emburey, Neil Foster, David Gower, Allan Lamb, Jack Richards, Gladstone Small

=== Pakistan ===
Imran Khan (captain), Asif Mujtaba, Ijaz Ahmed, Javed Miandad, Manzoor Elahi, Mudassar Nazar, Qasim Omar, Rameez Raja, Saleem Jaffar, Saleem Yousuf, Shoaib Mohammad, Wasim Akram

=== West Indies ===
Viv Richards (captain), Winston Benjamin, Jeff Dujon, Joel Garner, Larry Gomes, Tony Gray, Gordon Greenidge, Roger Harper, Desmond Haynes, Michael Holding, Gus Logie, Malcolm Marshall, Richie Richardson, Courtney Walsh

== Match results ==
All matches played at WACA Ground, Perth. For full scorecards, follow this link

=== 1st match ===
30 December 1986 (D/N)
Scorecard

Pakistan; 199/8 (50 overs)	v	West Indies; 165 (46.2 overs)
Javed Miandad 53 (69); AH Gray 4/45 (10 overs)		RB Richardson 38 (48); Mudassar Nazar 3/36 (10 overs)

Pakistan won by 34 runs
WACA Ground, Perth, Western Australia
Umpires: PJ McConnell and SG Randell
Player of the match: Mudassar Nazar (PAK)

- West Indies won the toss and elected to field.
- Attendance: 11,900.

=== 2nd match ===
1 January 1987 (D/N)
Scorecard

England; 272/6 (49 overs)	v	Australia; 235 (48.2 overs)
BC Broad 76 (113); BA Reid 2/46 (10 overs)		DM Jones 104 (125); PAJ DeFreitas 3/42 (9.2 overs)

England won by 37 runs
WACA Ground, Perth, Western Australia
Umpires: RA French and PJ McConnell
Player of the match: IT Botham (ENG)

- England won the toss and elected to bat.
- The match was reduced to 49 overs per side.
- BC Broad, PAJ DeFreitas and GC Small (all ENG) made their ODI debuts.
- Attendance: 27,125.

=== 3rd match ===
2 January 1987 (D/N)
Scorecard

Australia; 273/6 (50 overs)	v	Pakistan; 274/9 (49.5 overs)
DM Jones 121 (113); Imran Khan 2/43 (10 overs)		Qasim Umar 67 (80); SR Waugh 4/48 (9.5 overs)

Pakistan won by 1 wicket
WACA Ground, Perth, Western Australia
Umpires: AR Crafter and SG Randell
Player of the match: DM Jones (AUS)

- Australia won the toss and elected to bat.
- GA Bishop (AUS) made his ODI debut.
- Attendance: 17,144.

=== 4th match ===
3 January 1987
Scorecard

England; 228/9 (50 overs)	v	West Indies; 209 (48.2 overs)
AJ Lamb 71 (108); J Garner 5/47 (10 overs)		AL Logie 51 (86); GR Dilley 4/46 (10 overs)

England won by 19 runs
WACA Ground, Perth, Western Australia
Umpires: RA French and PJ McConnell
Player of the match: GR Dilley (ENG)

- West Indies won the toss and elected to field.
- Attendance: 12,000.

=== 5th match ===
4 January 1987
Scorecard

West Indies; 255/8 (50 overs)	v	Australia; 91 (35.4 overs)
CG Greenidge 100 (119); SP O'Donnell 4/65 (10 overs)		SR Waugh 29 (47); AH Gray 3/9 (7.4 overs)

West Indies won by 164 runs
WACA Ground, Perth, Western Australia
Umpires: AR Crafter and SG Randell
Player of the match: CG Greenidge (WIN)

- Australia won the toss and elected to field.
- Attendance: 22,335.

=== 6th match ===
5 January 1987 (D/N)
Scorecard

Pakistan; 229/5 (50 overs)	v	England; 232/7 (49.4 overs)
Shoaib Mohammad 66 (117); JE Emburey 2/65 (10 overs)		BC Broad 97 (130); Manzoor Elahi 1/24 (3 overs); Shoaib Mohammad 1/24 (5 overs)

England won by 3 wickets
WACA Ground, Perth, Western Australia
Umpires: AR Crafter and RA French
Player of the match: BC Broad (ENG)

- Pakistan won the toss and elected to bat.
- Attendance: 9,304.

=== Final ===
7 January 1987
Scorecard

Pakistan; 166/9 (50 overs)	v	England; 167/5 (40.1 overs)
Javed Miandad 77* (127); GC Small 3/28 (10 overs)		MW Gatting 49 (72); Wasim Akram 3/27 (10 overs)

England won by 5 wickets
WACA Ground, Perth, Western Australia
Umpires: AR Crafter and RA French
Player of the match: Javed Miandad (PAK)

- England won the toss and elected to field.
- Attendance: 16,600.

Javed Miandad was named by Rod Marsh as the Benson and Hedges Challenge Champion (the name given to the Player of the Match in the Final) and was awarded an 18ct gold Longines Conquest watch, then valued at $15 000.

== Tournament highlights ==
- Pakistan's shock win over the West Indies in the opening match of the Challenge
- Ian Botham hitting Australian fast-medium bowler Simon Davis for 26 runs in an over
- John Emburey catching Ken MacLeay at long-on overhead, one-handed and falling backwards. The catch was named as Channel Nine's Classic Catch of 1986-87.
- Dean Jones scoring centuries on consecutive days against England and Pakistan
- Dean Jones and Steve Waugh adding 173 for the 4th wicket against Pakistan, then an Australian ODI 4th wicket record
- Asif Mujtaba guiding Pakistan from 6 for 129 to 9 for 274 against Australia
- England defeating a full-strength West Indies side to ensure an England-Pakistan final with two group matches to spare
- Gordon Greenidge scoring his first international century in Australia

The Challenge was England's second tournament victory of the 1986-87 Australian summer. They had retained The Ashes at the Melbourne Cricket Ground on 28 December 1986 and went on to win the Benson and Hedges World Series Cup against Australia and West Indies.
