= 2010–11 Australian cricket season =

Sporting season in Australia

- 2009–10 ^{.} Australian cricket season ^{.} 2011–12

The 2010–11 Australian cricket season consists of international matches played by the Australian cricket team in Australia as well as Australian domestic cricket matches under the auspices of Cricket Australia.

== One Day domestic cricket ==
The Ryobi One-Day Cup will open on 6 October 2010 with a match between the Queensland Bulls and the Tasmanian Tigers
