= Brad Williams (cricketer) =

Australian cricketer

Personal information
- Full name: Brad Andrew Williams
- Born: 20 November 1974 (age 51); Frankston, Victoria, Australia
- Batting: Right-handed
- Bowling: Right arm fast
- Role: Bowler

International information
- National side: Australia (2002–2004)
- Test debut (cap 386): 17 October 2003 v Zimbabwe
- Last Test: 24 March 2004 v Sri Lanka
- ODI debut (cap 145): 11 January 2002 v New Zealand
- Last ODI: 25 May 2004 v Zimbabwe

Domestic team information
- Years: Team
- 1994/95–1998/99: Victoria
- 1999/00–2005/06: Western Australia
- 2005: Durham

Career statistics
| Competition | Test | ODI | FC | LA |
|---|---|---|---|---|
| Matches | 4 | 25 | 69 | 91 |
| Runs scored | 23 | 27 | 860 | 173 |
| Batting average | 7.66 | 13.50 | 13.87 | 14.41 |
| 100s/50s | 0/0 | 0/0 | 0/0 | 0/0 |
| Top score | 10* | 13* | 41* | 23 |
| Balls bowled | 852 | 1,203 | 13,807 | 4,518 |
| Wickets | 9 | 35 | 227 | 139 |
| Bowling average | 45.11 | 23.25 | 32.62 | 23.66 |
| 5 wickets in innings | 0 | 2 | 10 | 2 |
| 10 wickets in match | 0 | 0 | 0 | 0 |
| Best bowling | 4/53 | 5/22 | 6/74 | 5/22 |
| Catches/stumpings | 4/– | 4/– | 25/– | 16/– |
- Source: Cricinfo, 1 October 2017

Brad Andrew Williams (born 20 November 1974) is an Australian former cricketer, who played Tests and ODIs.

== Domestic career ==
He is a right arm fast bowler who made his first-class debut for Victoria in the 1994–95 season as a nineteen-year-old.

Williams moved to Western Australia for the 1999–2000 season after struggling to hold down a regular spot in the Victorian team. On the bouncy WACA pitch in Perth he went on to his most successful domestic season, capturing 50 first-class wickets, leading to his national debut the following year.

After taking five first class wickets for the Warriors at a bowling average of 57 in the first three matches of the 2005–06 season, he was dropped for the fourth game of the season against the Tasmanian Tigers, and he reacted by storming out of the training session and withdrawing himself for the team to play the Tigers in an ING Cup one-day match. That was viewed by the Western Australian Cricket Association as a breach of his playing contract, and Williams was suspended for the remainder of the season. When Western Australia announced their squad for the 2006/07 season he was the notable omission, ostensibly ending his cricket career.

== International career ==
At the time he had raw speed and was widely tipped as a future star for the national team, although his debut for Australia didn't come until a One Day International match against New Zealand in January 2001.

Williams had to wait until October 2003 for his Test debut but he struggled to hold down a regular spot in the national team, due in part to limited opportunity.

== Career highlights ==
- Williams' best Test batting score of 10 not out was made against India, Melbourne, 2003–2004
- His best Test bowling figures of 4 for 53 came against India, Melbourne, 2003–2004
- Williams' best ODI batting score of 13 not out was made against New Zealand, Melbourne, 2001–2002
- His best ODI bowling figures of 5 for 22 came against Zimbabwe, Sydney, 2003–2004
