= Richard Chee Quee =

Australian cricketer (born 1971)

Personal information
- Full name: Richard Chee Quee
- Born: 4 January 1971 (age 55); Camperdown, New South Wales, Australia
- Nickname: Shiek, Cheeks
- Batting: Right-handed
- Role: Top Order Batsman

Domestic team information
- Years: Team
- 1992/93–1997/98: New South Wales

Career statistics
Competition	First-class	List A
Matches	21	24
Runs scored	1,029	876
Batting average	28.58	39.81
100s/50s	1/6	1/5
Top score	105	131
Catches/stumpings	16/–	15/–
- Source: ESPNcricinfo, 14 May 2008

Richard Chee Quee (born 4 January 1971) is an Australian former first-class cricketer.

Chee Quee is notable for being the second player of Chinese origin to play first-class cricket in Australia after Hunter Poon in 1923. He played from 1992–1993 to 2000–2001 for New South Wales and scored nearly 11,000 runs in Sydney grade cricket for the Randwick and Randwick Petersham club.

== Domestic one day career ==
His greatest innings in domestic one day cricket was his first and only one day domestic century, in the 1993/94 Australian Domestic One-Day Cricket Final, where he smashed 131 for the Blues against Western Australia as part of a 199 run partnership with Michael Bevan that helped the Blues defeat WA by 43 runs. The partnership still stands as the highest 2nd wicket partnership in a one day match for New South Wales.

== First Class cricket ==
In the longer form of the game he also only scored a single first class century, a quickfire 105 in a tour game against the travelling West Indies in December 1995. Despite the Windies only coming to Australia to participate in the revived One Day International Tri-Series the tour included a four day, first class match vs New South Wales that was held in Newcastle. Once again he teamed with Bevan and the pair put on a 1st innings 191 run 4th wicket partnership with Chee Quee scoring 105 against the formidable West Indian bowling attack that included Curtly Ambrose, Roger Harper and Courtney Walsh, who bowled him to end his 196 ball innings and later dismissed Bevan also bowled, for 86. He did not bat in the 2nd innings as the game ended in a draw when rain & lightning prevented New South Wales from scoring the last 12 runs on their 89 target.

== Non-playing career ==
He is the lead vocalist in the rock band Six & Out. He also takes part in coaching clinics run by the Australian Cricket Association Masters team.
