= Denis Hickey =

Australian cricketer (born 1964)

Cricket information
- Batting: Right-handed
- Bowling: Right-arm fast

Career statistics
Competition	First-class	List A
Matches	57	20
Runs scored	363	19
Batting average	9.55	3.16
100s/50s	0/0	0/0
Top score	34	6*
Balls bowled	9,889	876
Wickets	156	27
Bowling average	40.28	24.85
5 wickets in innings	6	1
10 wickets in match	1	0
Best bowling	7/81	5/26
Catches/stumpings	13/–	4/–
- Source: CricketArchive, 3 February 2023

Denis Jon Hickey (born 31 December 1964) is a former Australian first class cricketer who played for Victoria and South Australia in the Sheffield Shield. A right arm fast bowler, he spent the 1986 English summer playing with Glamorgan after receiving a cricket scholarship.

The closest he came to playing for Australia was a tour of Zimbabwe in 1991 with Australia A.

Since his cricketing days he has carved out a successful corporate career and was CEO of ING Real Estate in Sydney, then Lendlease's global COO and chief executive of Americas until 2022.
