= Paul Jackson (Australian cricketer) =

Australian cricketer (born 1961)

Personal information
- Full name: Paul William Jackson
- Born: 1 November 1961 (age 65); East Melbourne, Victoria
- Batting: Right-handed
- Bowling: Slow left-arm orthodox
- Role: Bowler

Domestic team information
- Years: Team
- 1985/86–1991/92: Victoria
- 1992/93–1998/99: Queensland
- FC debut: 25 January 1986 Victoria v South Australia
- Last FC: 19 March 1999 Queensland v Western Australia
- LA debut: 15 February 1986 Victoria v New South Wales
- Last LA: 21 February 1999 Queensland v New South Wales

Career statistics
Competition	First-class	List A
Matches	105	41
Runs scored	967	87
Batting average	12.72	21.75
100s/50s	0/0	0/0
Top score	49	18*
Balls bowled	22,867	2,123
Wickets	240	52
Bowling average	38.27	27.61
5 wickets in innings	3	1
10 wickets in match	0	0
Best bowling	6/55	5/22
Catches/stumpings	29/–	9/–
- Source: CricketArchive, 10 April 2023

Paul William Jackson (born 1 November 1961) is an Australian cricketer who represented Victoria and Queensland from 1985–86 until 1998–99. He was part of Queensland's side when it won the Sheffield Shield for the first time during the 1994/95 season. In the Sheffield Shield final, Jackson took the catch for the final wicket which gave Queensland victory.

In his professional life he is a banking and finance executive. He was appointed to the board of Cricket Victoria in 2007.

== Career ==
In 1987–88. Jackson won a man of the match award for a Victoria vs South Australia McDonald's Cup game, taking 4–26.

His best first class seasons were 1993–94 when he took 28 wickets at 43.57 and 1994–95 when he took 28 wickets at 32.32.
