= Glenn Bishop =

Australian cricketer

Personal information
- Full name: Glenn Andrew Bishop
- Born: 25 February 1960 (age 66); Adelaide, South Australia
- Batting: Right-handed
- Role: Batsman

International information
- National side: Australia
- ODI debut (cap 95): 2 January 1987 v Pakistan
- Last ODI: 4 January 1987 v West Indies

Domestic team information
- Years: Team
- 1982/83–1992/93: South Australia

Career statistics
Competition	ODI	FC	LA
Matches	2	96	38
Runs scored	13	6,206	885
Batting average	6.50	37.38	24.58
100s/50s	0/0	13/29	2/2
Top score	7	224*	119*
Balls bowled	–	91	6
Wickets	–	0	1
Bowling average	–	–	5.00
5 wickets in innings	–	–	0
10 wickets in match	–	–	0
Best bowling	–	–	1/5
Catches/stumpings	1/– /-	66/–	16/–
- Source: Cricinfo, 7 August 2011

Glenn Andrew Bishop (born 25 February 1960) is a former Australian and South Australian cricketer who represented Australia in two One Day Internationals, playing as a right-handed batsman.

At the age of 17, Bishop scored 129 and 101 for Salisbury Second XI in Adelaide's suburban competition, becoming the first to score a century in each innings for Salisbury. He made his first-class debut in 1982–83 for South Australia, primarily as an opening batsman, and was on the fringes of Australian selection in the mid-1980s.

Bishop was awarded an ESSO Australian Cricket Scholarship for the 1985 English cricket season, where he played for Leicestershire County Cricket Club's Second XI in the Second XI Championship.

Bishop made his ODI debut in January 1987 against Pakistan at the WACA Ground in the Benson & Hedges Perth Challenge series as an opening batsman. He scored only six from twenty balls, and took his only catch to dismiss Rameez Raja as Pakistan won the match off the second last ball with only one wicket in hand. He played his second and final ODI at the same venue two days later against the West Indies, this time at number five, managing only 7 from 29 deliveries. Bishop was selected as a reserve for the 1987 Cricket World Cup.

Bishop had a liking for international touring teams, scoring five of his thirteen first-class centuries against them, including three against New Zealand. He also performed best at the Adelaide Oval where he scored ten of his centuries, including his top-score of 224* against Tasmania in 1985–86. He passed the 5000 run mark in the 1990–91 season, setting a seventh wicket partnership record of 198 with Tim May.

Bishop retired at the end of the 1992–93 season, having played 96 matches, scoring 6206 runs at 37.38. In the limited overs format, he played 26 matches, scoring 708 runs at an average of 29.5 with two centuries, as well as his only wicket.

== Sources ==
- Cashman; Franks; Maxwell; Sainsbury; Stoddart; Weaver; Webster (1997). The A-Z of Australian cricketers. ISBN 978-0-19-550604-4.
