= Australian cricket team in India in 2017–18 =

International cricket tour

	India	Australia
- Dates: 12 September – 13 October 2017
Captains	Virat Kohli	Steve Smith (ODIs); David Warner (T20Is)

One Day International series
- Results: India won the 5-match series 4–1
Most runs	Rohit Sharma (296)	Aaron Finch (250)
Most wickets	Kuldeep Yadav (7)	Nathan Coulter-Nile (10)
- Player of the series: Hardik Pandya (Ind)

Twenty20 International series
- Results: 3-match series drawn 1–1
Most runs	Kedar Jadhav (27)	Moises Henriques (70)
Most wickets	Jasprit Bumrah (3)	Jason Behrendorff (4)

The Australia cricket team toured India in September and October 2017 to play five One Day Internationals (ODIs) and three Twenty20 International (T20I) matches. The Board of Control for Cricket in India (BCCI) confirmed the full dates in September 2017. Ahead of the ODIs, Australia played a 50-over warm-up match against India's Board President XI, with Australia winning by 103 runs. India won the ODI series 4–1 and returned to the top of the ICC ODI Championship. In accordance with the International Cricket Council's (ICC) new playing conditions, the Decision Review System (DRS) was used for the first time in a T20I match in this series. The T20I series was drawn 1–1, with the third match called off due to a wet outfield.

== Squads ==
ODIs		T20Is	
India	Australia	India	Australia
Virat Kohli (c); Rohit Sharma (vc); Jasprit Bumrah; Yuzvendra Chahal; ~~Shikhar Dhawan~~; MS Dhoni (wk); Ravindra Jadeja; Kedar Jadhav; Bhuvneshwar Kumar; Manish Pandey; Hardik Pandya; Axar Patel; Ajinkya Rahane; KL Rahul; Mohammed Shami; Kuldeep Yadav; Umesh Yadav	Steve Smith (c); David Warner (vc); Ashton Agar; Hilton Cartwright; Nathan Coulter-Nile; Pat Cummins; Peter Handscomb; James Faulkner; Aaron Finch; ~~Josh Hazlewood~~; Travis Head; Glenn Maxwell; Kane Richardson; Marcus Stoinis; Matthew Wade (wk); Adam Zampa	Virat Kohli (c); Rohit Sharma (vc); Jasprit Bumrah; Yuzvendra Chahal; Shikhar Dhawan; MS Dhoni (wk); Kedar Jadhav; Dinesh Karthik; Bhuvneshwar Kumar; Ashish Nehra; Manish Pandey; Hardik Pandya; Axar Patel; KL Rahul; Kuldeep Yadav	~~Steve Smith (c)~~; David Warner (vc); Jason Behrendorff; Daniel Christian; Nathan Coulter-Nile; ~~Pat Cummins~~; Aaron Finch; Travis Head; Moisés Henriques; Glenn Maxwell; Tim Paine (wk); Kane Richardson; Marcus Stoinis; Andrew Tye; Adam Zampa

Josh Hazlewood was ruled out of Australia's squad, after suffering an injury during the first Test against Bangladesh in August 2017. Kane Richardson was added to Australia's squad as a replacement for Hazlewood. Peter Handscomb was added Australia's ODI squad as a cover for Aaron Finch, who was struggling with a calf injury. Ashton Agar fractured a finger during the third ODI, therefore ruling him out of the rest of the series.

Shikhar Dhawan was not available for the first three ODIs, as he took leave to attend to his wife, who was unwell. After the third ODI, he was not named in India's squad for the final two ODI matches, with no replacement named. Ravindra Jadeja was added to India's ODI squad for the first three matches, as a replacement for Axar Patel who injured his ankle. Patel was included for the last two ODIs, replacing Jadeja.

Ahead of the T20I series, Australia rested Pat Cummins, due to his increased workload schedule. Andrew Tye was named as his replacement. While fielding during the fifth ODI, Steve Smith picked up a shoulder injury, and was sidelined for the T20I series, with Marcus Stoinis being called up as a replacement, and David Warner given the captaincy.

== Tour match ==
=== One-day: India Board President XI vs Australia ===
12 September 2017
Scorecard

Australia; 347/7 (50 overs)	v	India Board President XI; 244 (48.2 overs)
Marcus Stoinis 76 (60); Washington Sundar 2/23 (8 overs)		Shreevats Goswami 43 (54); Ashton Agar 4/44 (8.2 overs)

Australia won by 103 runs
M. A. Chidambaram Stadium, Chennai
Umpires: Jayaraman Madanagopal (Ind) and Sadashiv Iyer (Ind)

- Australia won the toss and elected to bat.

== ODI Series ==
=== 1st ODI ===
17 September 2017
13:30 (D/N)
Scorecard

India; 281/7 (50 overs)	v	Australia; 137/9 (21 overs)
Hardik Pandya 83 (66); Nathan Coulter-Nile 3/44 (10 overs)		Glenn Maxwell 39 (18); Yuzvendra Chahal 3/30 (5 overs)

India won by 26 runs (DLS method)
M. A. Chidambaram Stadium, Chennai
Umpires: Anil Chaudhary (Ind) and Marais Erasmus (SA)
Player of the match: Hardik Pandya (Ind)

- India won the toss and elected to bat.
- Rain during the innings break set Australia a revised target of 164 runs from 21 overs.
- Hilton Cartwright (Aus) made his ODI debut.

=== 2nd ODI ===
21 September 2017
13:30 (D/N)
Scorecard

India; 252 (50 overs)	v	Australia; 202 (43.1 overs)
Virat Kohli 92 (107); Nathan Coulter-Nile 3/51 (10 overs)		Marcus Stoinis 62* (65); Bhuvneshwar Kumar 3/9 (6.1 overs)

India won by 50 runs
Eden Gardens, Kolkata
Umpires: Anil Chaudhary (Ind) and Richard Illingworth (Eng)
Player of the match: Virat Kohli (Ind)

- India won the toss and elected to bat.
- Steve Smith (Aus) played in his 100th ODI.
- Kuldeep Yadav (Ind) became the third bowler for India to take a hat-trick in an ODI.

=== 3rd ODI ===
24 September 2017
13:30 (D/N)
Scorecard

Australia; 293/6 (50 overs)	v	India; 294/5 (47.5 overs)
Aaron Finch 124 (125); Jasprit Bumrah 2/52 (10 overs)		Hardik Pandya 78 (72); Pat Cummins 2/54 (10 overs)

India won by 5 wickets
Holkar Stadium, Indore
Umpires: Marais Erasmus (SA) and Chettithody Shamshuddin (Ind)
Player of the match: Hardik Pandya (Ind)

- Australia won the toss and elected to bat.

=== 4th ODI ===
28 September 2017
13:30 (D/N)
Scorecard

Australia; 334/5 (50 overs)	v	India; 313/8 (50 overs)
David Warner 124 (119); Umesh Yadav 4/71 (10 overs)		Kedar Jadhav 67 (69); Kane Richardson 3/58 (10 overs)

Australia won by 21 runs
M. Chinnaswamy Stadium, Bangalore
Umpires: Richard Illingworth (Eng) and Chettithody Shamshuddin (Ind)
Player of the match: David Warner (Aus)

- Australia won the toss and elected to bat.
- David Warner (Aus) played in his 100th ODI and became the first batsman for Australia to score a century in his 100th ODI.
- Umesh Yadav (Ind) took his 100th wicket in ODIs.

=== 5th ODI ===
1 October 2017
13:30 (D/N)
Scorecard

Australia; 242/9 (50 overs)	v	India; 243/3 (42.5 overs)
David Warner 53 (62); Axar Patel 3/38 (10 overs)		Rohit Sharma 125 (109); Adam Zampa 2/59 (8 overs)

India won by 7 wickets
Vidarbha Cricket Association Stadium, Nagpur
Umpires: Marais Erasmus (SA) and C. K. Nandan (Ind)
Player of the match: Rohit Sharma (Ind)

- Australia won the toss and elected to bat.

== T20I Series ==
=== 1st T20I ===
7 October 2017
19:00 (N)
Scorecard

Australia; 118/8 (18.4 overs)	v	India; 49/1 (5.3 overs)
Aaron Finch 42 (30); Kuldeep Yadav 2/16 (4 overs)		Virat Kohli 22* (14); Nathan Coulter-Nile 1/20 (2 overs)

India won by 9 wickets (DLS method)
JSCA International Stadium Complex, Ranchi
Umpires: Nitin Menon (Ind) and Chettithody Shamshuddin (Ind)
Player of the match: Kuldeep Yadav (Ind)

- India won the toss and elected to field.
- Rain during Australia's innings set India a revised target of 48 runs from 6 overs.
- Jason Behrendorff (Aus) made his T20I debut.

=== 2nd T20I ===
10 October 2017
19:00 (N)
Scorecard

India; 118 (20 overs)	v	Australia; 122/2 (15.3 overs)
Kedar Jadhav 27 (27); Jason Behrendorff 4/21 (4 overs)		Moisés Henriques 62* (46); Bhuvneshwar Kumar 1/9 (3 overs)

Australia won by 8 wickets
Barsapara Cricket Stadium, Guwahati
Umpires: Nitin Menon (Ind) and C. K. Nandan (Ind)
Player of the match: Jason Behrendorff (Aus)

- Australia won the toss and elected to field.
- This was the first international cricket match to be played at this venue.
- Kedar Jadhav played his last T20I.

=== 3rd T20I ===
13 October 2017
19:00 (N)
Scorecard

India	v	Australia

Match abandoned
Rajiv Gandhi International Cricket Stadium, Hyderabad
Umpires: Anil Chaudhary (Ind) and C. K. Nandan (Ind)

- No toss.
- No play was possible due to a wet outfield.
