= Don O'Connor =

Australian cricketer (born 1958)

Personal information
- Full name: Donald Frederick Gregory O'Connor
- Born: 20 July 1958 (age 68); Gilgandra, New South Wales, Australia
- Batting: Left-handed
- Bowling: Right-arm off break

Domestic team information
- Years: Team
- 1989/90: Tasmania
- 1983/84–1987/88: South Australia

Career statistics
Competition	First-class	List A
Matches	35	19
Runs scored	1,806	436
Batting average	35.41	36.33
100s/50s	2/14	–/2
Top score	120	96*
Balls bowled	121	–
Wickets	2	–
Bowling average	48.50	–
5 wickets in innings	–	–
10 wickets in match	–	–
Best bowling	1/2	–
Catches/stumpings	20/–	15/–
- Source: Cricinfo, 2 January 2011

Donald O'Connor (born 1958, Gilgandra, New South Wales) is an Australian cricketer who played first class cricket for Tasmania and South Australia. He was a talented left-handed batsman, who played interstate cricket from 1981 until 1990.

O'Connor was raised on a farm outside Gilgandra. He was educated at Gilgandra's St Joseph's Catholic Primary School by the Sisters of St Joseph (the 'black Joeys'). From 1971 to 1974 he attended Gilgandra High School. His cricketing talent showed early during his school years and in high school he was selected in regional representative schoolboy teams.

== See also ==
- List of Tasmanian representative cricketers
