= Jason Bakker =

Australian cricketer (born 1967)

Personal information
- Born: 12 November 1967 (age 59); Geelong, Australia

Domestic team information
- Years: Team
- 1995-2000: Victoria
- Source: Cricinfo, 12 December 2015

Jason Bakker (born 12 November 1967) is an Australian former cricketer. He played eleven first-class cricket matches for Victoria between 1995 and 2000.

In 2007 Bakker founded a sports management company, Signature Sports, and is the manager of cyclist Cadel Evans, among other athletes.

== See also ==
- List of Victoria first-class cricketers
