= Danny Buckingham =

Australian cricket player

Personal information
- Full name: Danny James Buckingham
- Born: 2 December 1964 (age 61); Burnie, Tasmania, Australia
- Batting: Right-handed
- Bowling: Leg-break
- Role: Occasional wicket-keeper

Domestic team information
- Years: Team
- 1983/84–1993/94: Tasmania

Career statistics
Competition	First-class	List A
Matches	83	23
Runs scored	4,769	506
Batting average	37.25	28.11
100s/50s	9/24	0/2
Top score	167	61
Balls bowled	1,243	–
Wickets	12	–
Bowling average	59.91	–
5 wickets in innings	0	–
10 wickets in match	0	–
Best bowling	2/27	–
Catches/stumpings	59/0	8/0
- Source: CricketArchive, 22 August 2010

Danny James Buckingham (born 2 December 1964) is an Australian former cricketer, who played for the Tasmanian Tigers from 1983–84 until 1993–94.

Buckingham was a reliable batting all-rounder, who only very occasionally bowled his right-arm leg spin, but contributed with the bat for Tasmania at a time when the fledgling state side was struggling for success.

His dogged contributions for a side which only very rarely won matches sees him as a member of the state's elite Cricket Hall of Fame in 2002.
