= Graham Smith (Australian cricketer) =

Australian cricketer (born 1964)

Personal information
- Full name: Graham Leslie Smith
- Born: 13 January 1964 (age 62); Stockinbingal, New South Wales, Australia
- Batting: Right-handed
- Bowling: Right-arm medium
- Role: All-rounder

Domestic team information
- Years: Team
- 1985/86–1989/90: New South Wales

Career statistics
Competition	List A
Matches	13
Runs scored	270
Batting average	33.75
100s/50s	0/1
Top score	58*
Balls bowled	447
Wickets	10
Bowling average	27.70
5 wickets in innings	0
10 wickets in match	–
Best bowling	2/13
Catches/stumpings	6/–
- Source: Cricinfo, 1 February 2017

Graham Leslie Smith (born 13 January 1964) is an Australian cricketer. He played thirteen List A matches for New South Wales between 1985/86 and 1989/90.

Smith was a lower-order batsman, medium-pace bowler and sharp fieldsman. He won the man of the match awards for his all-round contributions for New South Wales in three consecutive games in the 1987–88 McDonald's Cup: the last preliminary round against Tasmania, the semi-final against Victoria, and the final against South Australia, which New South Wales won.
