= Michael Bevan =

Australian cricketer

Personal information
- Full name: Michael Gwyl Bevan
- Born: 8 May 1970 (age 56); Belconnen, Australian Capital Territory
- Height: 180 cm (5 ft 11 in)
- Batting: Left-handed
- Bowling: Slow left-arm wrist spin
- Role: Batsman

International information
- National side: Australia (1994–2004)
- Test debut (cap 360): 28 September 1994 v Pakistan
- Last Test: 2 January 1998 v South Africa
- ODI debut (cap 116): 14 April 1994 v Sri Lanka
- Last ODI: 29 February 2004 v Sri Lanka
- ODI shirt no.: 12

Domestic team information
- Years: Team
- 1989/90: South Australia
- 1990/91–2003/04: New South Wales
- 1995–1996: Yorkshire
- 1998–2000: Sussex
- 2002: Leicestershire
- 2004: Kent
- 2004/05–2005/06: Tasmania

Career statistics
Competition	Test	ODI	FC	LA
Matches	18	232	237	427
Runs scored	785	6,912	19,147	15,103
Batting average	29.07	53.58	57.32	57.86
100s/50s	0/6	6/46	68/81	13/116
Top score	91	108*	216	157*
Balls bowled	1,285	1,966	8,769	3,546
Wickets	29	36	119	93
Bowling average	24.24	45.97	44.89	33.27
5 wickets in innings	1	0	1	1
10 wickets in match	1	0	1	0
Best bowling	6/82	3/36	6/82	5/29
Catches/stumpings	8/–	69/–	122/–	128/–
Medal record
Men's Cricket
Representing Australia
ICC Cricket World Cup
Winner	1999 England-Wales -Ireland-Scotland-Netherlands
Winner	2003 South Africa-Zimbabwe-Kenya
Runner-up	1996 India-Pakistan-Sri Lanka
Commonwealth Games
Silver medal – second place	1998 Kuala Lumpur
- Source: ESPNcricinfo, 6 March 2008

Michael Gwyl Bevan (born 8 May 1970) is an Australian former international cricketer. He played as a left-handed batsman and a slow left-arm wrist spin bowler. Bevan is widely considered as one of the greatest One Day International (ODI) batsmen of all-time, and topped the International Cricket Council's batting rankings in the format on numerous occasions. He was the first Canberra-born player to represent Australia at international level. He played 232 ODIs for Australia, and was a part of the Australian squads which won the 1999 and 2003 Cricket World Cups. He represented Australia at the 1998 Commonwealth Games, where cricket was included in the Games for the first time.

Bevan was an Australian Cricket Academy scholarship holder in 1989. He scored a total of 15,103 runs in List A cricket at an average of 57.86 runs per innings. This is the highest batting average for any player who has batted in 50 or more innings. In 2007 he was named in Australia's greatest ODI team, while in 2025, he was inducted into the Australian Cricket Hall of Fame. The Michael Bevan Medal, for the player of the match in the Australian Domestic One-Day Cricket Final, is named after him.

== Playing career ==
Michael Bevan's first senior club was Weston Creek Cricket Club in Canberra. He made his first-class debut during the 1989-90 domestic season for South Australia, scoring a century on debut against Western Australia.

After a single season with South Australia, Bevan moved to play for New South Wales, where he spent the majority of his career. He played in English County Cricket for Yorkshire, Leicestershire, Sussex and Kent County Cricket Clubs. After 14 seasons, he moved to play for Tasmania ahead of the 2004–05 season Sheffield Shield season, scoring a then-record 1,464 first-class runs in the season. He retired from cricket at the end of the 2006–07 season.

=== ODI career ===
He made his ODI debut on 14 April 1994 against Sri Lanka in the 1994 Austral-Asia Cup at Sharjah and was not required to bat, as Australia chased down 155 comfortably with nine wickets to spare. By the 1995–96 season, he became a regular in the team. He proved a reliable anchor at the bottom of the middle order, and he would often patiently guide Australia to victory following a rare top-order collapse – leading to him being nicknamed "The Finisher". By the end of his ODI career, Bevan was known as the "Pyjama Picasso". During his ODI career, he managed to hit just 21 sixes in 232 ODI matches, a testament to his calculating style and batting role that required protecting his vital wicket rather than attempting risky aerial shots. He batted 45 times in successful ODI run chases for Australia; and, out of those 45 outings, he remained unbeaten at the crease on 25 occasions.

One of his most famous "anchor" innings was in the New Year's Day One Day International at the Sydney Cricket Ground against the West Indies in 1996 during the Benson & Hedges World Series. With the Australians at one stage 6/38 chasing 173, his unbeaten 150-minute 78 got the Australians over the line with a four or more required on the last ball to achieve victory. He was the second leading run scorer in the 1995/96 Benson & Hedges World Series only behind Mark Taylor with an aggregate of 389 runs in 10 innings at an average of 194.50, bolstered by eight not-outs in his 10 innings.

He featured in his first World Cup tournament during the 1996 Cricket World Cup and played a crucial role to help Australia to reach the final of the tournament by scoring 69 runs in the semi-final clash against the West Indies, a match which is highly remembered and known due to the dramatic collapse of the West Indies in a low-scoring run chase of 208. He also played an important cameo of unbeaten 36 off 49 balls in the 1996 World Cup final which propelled Australia to a decent total of 241/7 on the board. However, his efforts went in vain as Sri Lanka chased down 242 to win their maiden World Cup title.

He was selected to the Australian squad for the 50-over cricket tournament at the 1998 Commonwealth Games where Australia became runners-up in the competition to South Africa. He was a key member of the Australian team which lifted the 1999 Cricket World Cup.

On 8 April 2000, he played arguably the best knock of his career where he steered the mammoth epic run chase of 321 by scoring an unbeaten 185 off just 132 deliveries in an unofficial ODI held in Dhaka which almost guaranteed Rest of the World XI for an unlikely victory against the Asia XI. Rest of the World XI at one stage were reeling at 7/196 in the 37th over and was staring at a big defeat before Bevan came to the rescue who smashed 19 fours and five sixes to provide a glimmer of hope. He alongside Andy Caddick put on a 119 run partnership for the eighth wicket which led to a great recovery for the chasing team. However, Rest of the World XI lost by just one run in the end despite the heroics of Bevan. Caddick was involved in a brain-fade moment in the critical juncture of the match as he was run out on the penultimate delivery effectively denying Rest of the World XI a famous win given the circumstances on how the game had panned out. However, his knock of 185 not out could not be realised as Bevan's highest ODI or even List A score due to the fact that the match did not have any status as it was deemed as an unofficial ODI meaning the match does not even count as a List A match.

In January 2002, he scored a crucial unbeaten 95 ball 102 in a match against New Zealand in a modest run chase of 246 at the iconic Melbourne Cricket Ground. He arrived to the crease as he once again had to do the bulk of scoring runs after a top-order collapse leaving Australia were reeling at 82/6 at one point and later 143/7. His knock guaranteed Australia a thrilling two wicket win over New Zealand with three balls to spare.

Bevan entered the 2003 Cricket World Cup injured. He played his first game in the group stage against India. He didn't bat until the fifth group game against Namibia and he registered a rusty 17 before being caught and bowled by Louis Burger. In the final group game against England, he came in with Australia struggling at 48–4. He then was joined by Andy Bichel at 135–8 with 70 runs still required to win. Bevan finished on 74 not out and Bichel 34 not out as Australia won in the final over. An unbeaten group stage was followed by an unbeaten Super Six stage. He made 56 against New Zealand helping Australia recover from 84–7 again batting with Bichel to help Australia win. His last knock was an unfortunate golden duck in the semi-final against Sri Lanka and he was not required to bat in the final which Australia won.

=== Test career ===
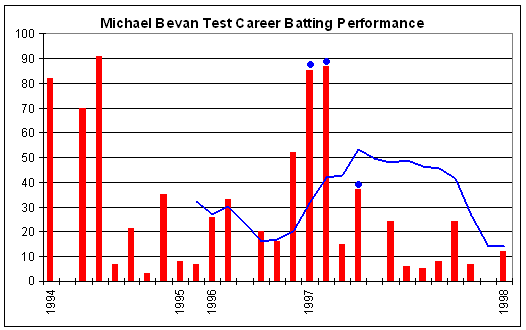
Michael Bevan's Test career batting performance.

Despite his ODI success, Bevan's Test career was not nearly as successful. Thought to be susceptible to short-pitched deliveries, he had limited success as a Test batsman, with an average of only 29. He ended up his topsy-turvy Test career without a career century to his name. However he scored heavily in domestic first-class cricket for New South Wales, averaging almost 60 with the bat. He performed well during his limited time as a bowler in Test matches, with his bowling style of left-arm unorthodox spin, which included taking ten wickets in a Test match against the West Indies at the Adelaide Oval.

The retirement of Allan Border opened doors for his arrival to international cricket. He made his Test debut against Pakistan on 28 September 1994 as the 360th Test cap for Australia. He had a promising start to his Test career scoring 82 batting at no 5 on his debut in Australia's first innings and just fell short of 18 runs which would have brought him in an elite list of Test centurions on debut. He continued his momentum in his debut Test series which was against Pakistan by making two more half-centuries. During the Test series against the West Indies in 1997–98, he showed his all-round prowess both with the bat and ball scoring two unbeaten 80s when batting down the order and often ran out of partners during the course of those knocks while also picking up 15 wickets.

He admitted that the reason why his Test career never really took off is mainly due to the psychological reasons and not the technical reasons.

=== Retirement ===
On 17 January 2007, due to injuries, Bevan announced his retirement from all forms of cricket. Bevan said, "It got to the stage where injuries and pain were holding back my motivation, and it got to the stage where I was finding it hard to get up for matches and that was probably a pretty clear indication that it was time to move on."

== Post-playing career ==
=== Coaching ===
Apart from coaching the Chennai Superstars in the Indian Cricket League, Bevan participated in the Beach Cricket Tri-Nations series for Australia. In January 2011, Bevan was announced the coach for Indian Premier League team Kings XI Punjab.

=== Television ===
In 2020, Bevan was revealed to be the 'Hammerhead' in the second season of The Masked Singer Australia and was the second contestant eliminated, placing 11th overall.

=== Professional career ===
Bevan later started a mortgage broking franchise and features on the Australian speaking circuit.
