= Clinton Perren =

Australian cricketer (born 1975)

Personal information
- Full name: Clinton Terrence Perren
- Born: 22 February 1975 (age 51); Herston, Queensland, Australia
- Nickname: CP
- Height: 1.81 m (5 ft 11 in)
- Batting: Right-handed
- Bowling: Right-arm medium
- Role: Batsman

Domestic team information
- Years: Team
- 1997/98–2008/09: Queensland
- 2003–2004: Cheshire
- FC debut: 27 October 1998 Queensland v New South Wales
- Last FC: 16 December 2008 Queensland v Tasmania
- LA debut: 13 December 1997 Queensland v New Zealanders
- Last LA: 18 February 2009 Queensland v South Australia

Career statistics
Competition	FC	LA	T20
Matches	84	105	7
Runs scored	4,785	2,919	147
Batting average	34.92	35.59	24.50
100s/50s	10/23	2/21	0/1
Top score	224	117	82
Balls bowled	342	329	–
Wickets	2	4	–
Bowling average	75.00	74.75	–
5 wickets in innings	0	0	–
10 wickets in match	0	0	–
Best bowling	1/7	1/10	–
Catches/stumpings	80/–	37/–	2/–
- Source: CricketArchive, 5 November 2011

Clinton Terrence Perren (born 22 February 1975) is a former Australian first-class cricketer who played for Queensland. He was a right-handed middle order batsman.

Perren was a graduate of the Australian cricket academy in 1995 but had to wait until the 1998–99 season to make his first-class debut. He was named Pura Cup player of the Year in 2002–03 and was rewarded by being selected to play for Australia A against South Africa A. In the 2003–04 season, he added a record 369 with Stuart Law for the second wicket against Western Australia.

He played a major part in his state's record total in the 2005–06 Pura Cup final. Perren scored 173 as Queensland scored 6 for 900 declared. He added 329 with Shane Watson which is a fourth wicket record for the Bulls. It capped off a great season by Perren as he had earlier scored the fourth-highest score ever by a Queenslander at the Gabba. He made 224 against South Australia, opening the batting.

He has failed to convert his 50s into centuries in the one day format, and had a highest score of 99 for many seasons until his maiden ING Cup century in 2004–05 against Tasmania.
