= 2009–10 Australian cricket season =

- 2008–09 ^{.} Australian cricket season ^{.} 2010–11

The 2009–10 Australian cricket season consists of international matches played by the Australian cricket team in Australia as well as Australian domestic cricket matches under the auspices of Cricket Australia.

== Australian Cricket Team ==
West Indies will tour Australia between November and February in a three-Test tour as well as ODIs and Twenty-20 matches.

Pakistan will tour Australia between December and February in a three-Test tour as well as ODIs and Twenty-20 matches.

New Zealand women will tour Australia in February 2010 for ODI and Twenty-20 series.

== Sheffield Shield ==
The Sheffield Shield will open on 13 October 2009 with matches between South Australia and Tasmania in Adelaide and Western Australia and Queensland in Perth.

== One Day Domestic ==
The Ford Ranger One Day Cup will open on 11 October 2009 with a match between Western Australia and Queensland at the WACA Ground.

== Twenty20 Domestic ==
The KFC Twenty20 Big Bash will open on 28 December 2009 with a match between Queensland and Victoria.
