= Ian Carmichael (cricketer) =

English cricketer (born 1960)

Ian Robert Carmichael (born 17 December 1960 in Hull) is a former English cricketer who played first-class cricket for Leicestershire and South Australia in the mid-1980s. A left-arm fast-medium bowler he took 86 wickets in 33 first-class matches.

== See also ==
- List of South Australian representative cricketers
