= Shane Lee (cricketer) =

Australian cricketer

Personal information
- Full name: Shane Lee
- Born: 8 August 1973 (age 53); Wollongong, New South Wales, Australia
- Batting: Right-handed
- Bowling: Right–arm medium
- Role: All-rounder
- Relatives: Brett Lee (brother)

International information
- National side: Australia (1995–2001)
- ODI debut (cap 124): 17 December 1995 v West Indies
- Last ODI: 3 April 2001 v India

Domestic team information
- Years: Team
- 1992/93–2001/02: New South Wales
- 1996: Somerset
- 2002: Worcestershire

Career statistics
Competition	ODI	FC	LA
Matches	45	93	147
Runs scored	477	5,071	2,869
Batting average	17.66	39.31	28.12
100s/50s	0/0	12/24	4/13
Top score	47	183*	115
Balls bowled	1,706	10,195	5,523
Wickets	48	150	162
Bowling average	25.93	40.52	26.45
5 wickets in innings	1	0	1
10 wickets in match	0	0	0
Best bowling	5/33	4/20	5/33
Catches/stumpings	23/–	74/–	73/–
Medal record
Men's Cricket
Representing Australia
ICC Cricket World Cup
Winner	1999 England-Wales -Ireland-Scotland-Netherlands
Runner-up	1996 India-Pakistan-Sri Lanka
- Source: Cricinfo, 4 October 2009

Shane Lee (born 8 August 1973) is a former Australian first-class cricketer. He was an all-rounder known for his hard batting and medium-pace bowling and is the elder brother of Australian pace bowler Brett Lee. He played for Australia and also captained the NSW team. Lee was a part of the Australian team that won the 1999 Cricket World Cup.

== Career ==
Lee was a promising junior, representing the Australia under-19 team. He was an AIS Australian Cricket Academy scholarship holder in 1990 and 1994 and was a contemporary of future international teammate Adam Gilchrist. He first played for New South Wales in 1993 and was called up for the Australian one day team in 1995.

Despite being included in the 1996 and 1999 World Cup squads, he only really established himself in the team in the 1999–2000 Carlton and United Series along with the emergence of his younger brother, fast bowler Brett Lee. His best bowling performance in ODI was 8.1–0–33–5 against Sri Lanka at MCG in 1999 during the Carlton & United Series.

He also had a successful season with Somerset, scoring over 1,000 runs in 1996, and Worcestershire in the English County Championship.

In 2002 aged just 29, Lee retired from cricket due to knee injuries. Between 1995 and 2001 he played 45 One Day Internationals scoring 477 runs and taking 48 wickets.

== Personal life ==
Lee is the oldest of three boys and they grew up in the Shellharbour suburb of Oak Flats. He regularly played cricket with younger brothers Brett and Grant outside their house and they followed his footsteps into the New South Wales under-17 team, although Grant later gave up the game at age 18.

== Post-playing career ==
Nine Network's Changing Rooms, hosted by Suzie Wilks, featured Shane and brother Brett renovating each other's rooms with help from a professional designer.

He is also a member of rock group Six & Out, along with his brother Brett and four former New South Wales teammates. Shane plays lead and rhythm guitars, and supplies backing vocals.

With businessman and ex-cricketer Neil Maxwell, he co-founded the marketing firm Insite Organisation, sold to Mitchell Communication Group in 2009.
