= Paul Nobes =

Australian cricketer

Personal information
- Born: 20 April 1964 (age 62)
- Batting: Right-handed

Career statistics
Competition	First-class	List A
Matches	86	35
Runs scored	6,180	1,021
Batting average	41.75	32.93
100s/50s	15/39	1/6
Top score	146*	140*
Balls bowled	53	–
Wickets	0	–
Bowling average	–	–
5 wickets in innings	–	–
10 wickets in match	–	–
Best bowling	–	–
Catches/stumpings	53/–	7/–
- Source: CricketArchive, 3 February 2023

Paul Christopher Nobes (born 20 April 1964) is a former Australian first class cricketer. He was a right-handed top order batsman, usually playing at 3 or as an opener.

Nobes attended Northfield High School in the northern suburbs of Adelaide from 1977–81. He started his state cricket career with South Australia in the 1988/89 season. After just one game he found himself facing the touring West Indian side and performed with distinction, making 95 in his second innings. He spent 1991/92 and 1992/93 with Victoria before he returned to South Australia and continued to perform consistently, scoring over 700 runs in each of the next three seasons.

Nobes performed well in Sheffield Shield finals, he made a century against Queensland when they lost the 1994/95 final and another when drew the final against Western Australia the following season. Since South Australia topped the rankings in the regular season, they won the Shield.

He later served as South Australia's chairman of selectors.
