= Troy Corbett =

Australian cricketer (born 1972)

Personal information
- Born: 11 October 1972 (age 54); Ouyen, Australia

Domestic team information
- Years: Team
- 1994-1997: Victoria
- Source: Cricinfo, 10 December 2015

Troy Corbett (born 11 October 1972) is an Australian former cricketer. He played 13 first-class cricket matches for Victoria between 1994 and 1997.

== See also ==
- List of Victoria first-class cricketers
