= Gavin Robertson =

Australian cricketer

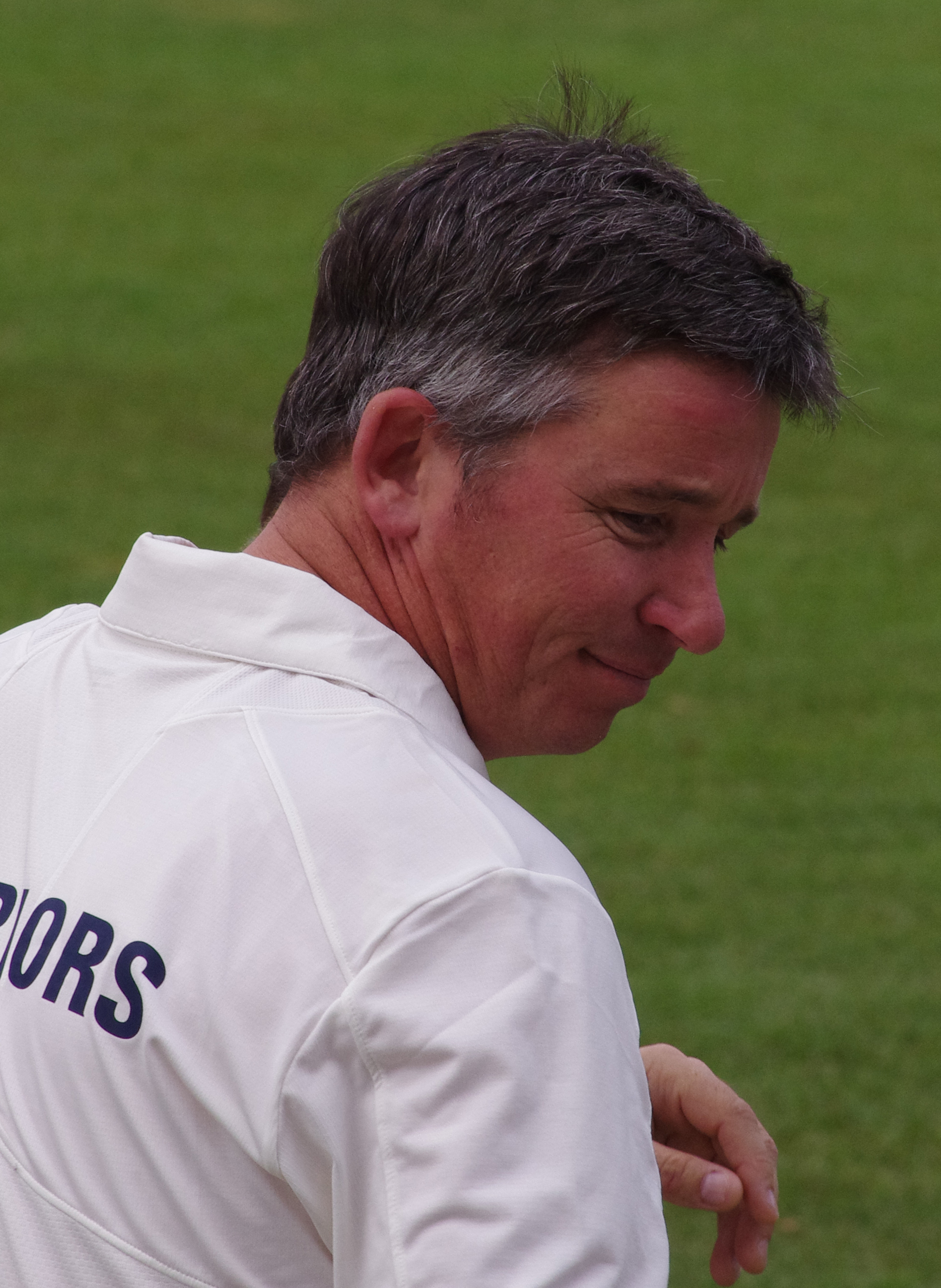

Personal information
- Full name: Gavin Ron Robertson
- Born: 28 May 1966 (age 60); St Leonards, New South Wales, Australia
- Batting: Right-handed
- Bowling: Right-arm offbreak
- Role: Bowler

International information
- National side: Australia
- Test debut (cap 375): 6 March 1998 v India
- Last Test: 22 October 1998 v Pakistan
- ODI debut (cap 119): 13 September 1994 v Sri Lanka
- Last ODI: 21 April 1998 v New Zealand

Domestic team information
- Years: Team
- 1987/88–1988/89: New South Wales
- 1989/90–1990/91: Tasmania
- 1991/92–1999/00: New South Wales

Career statistics
Competition	Test	ODI	FC	LA
Matches	4	13	58	64
Runs scored	140	45	1,658	284
Batting average	20.00	15.00	23.35	14.20
100s/50s	0/1	0/0	0/6	0/0
Top score	57	15	99	34*
Balls bowled	898	597	11,416	2,970
Wickets	13	8	127	58
Bowling average	39.61	53.75	41.86	35.15
5 wickets in innings	0	0	6	0
10 wickets in match	0	0	0	0
Best bowling	4/72	3/29	6/54	4/46
Catches/stumpings	1/–	3/–	30/–	18/–
Medal record
Representing Australia
Men's Cricket
Commonwealth Games
Silver medal – second place	1998 Kuala Lumpur	List-A cricket
- Source: Cricinfo, 12 December 2005

Gavin Ron Robertson (born 28 May 1966) is an Australian former cricketer. He was a right-handed offbreak bowler and a lower-order batsman.

== Career ==
Robertson made his debut for the New South Wales Blues in 1987. Two seasons later he moved to Tasmania in search of more playing time. He moved back to New South Wales after 2 seasons with the Tigers and was part of the successful 1992–93 Sheffield Shield-winning team. He retired in 2000.

Robertson made his Test debut for Australia in March 1998 against India in Chennai. He claimed 5 wickets in total. In Australia's first innings, by scoring 57, he shared a 96 runs partnership with Ian Healy for the 9th wicket to help the Australians for taking first innings lead. However, a Sachin Tendulkar century helped the Indians to post a match winning total in the second Innings.

Robertson currently hosts Talkin Sport on 2SM. He is also a regular panelist of Fox Sports program Bill & Boz.

== Personal life ==
Robertson is a member of the band Six & Out with four former New South Wales teammates. He plays the drums and supplies backing vocals. In May 2019 he was diagnosed with a brain tumour, and undertook operations and chemotherapy as treatment. He was able to play with the band at a reunion concert held in Melbourne in January 2024.
