= 2009–10 Sheffield Shield season =

Australian cricket tournament

2009–10 Sheffield Shield
- Administrator: Cricket Australia
- Cricket format: First-class
- Tournament format: Double round-robin
- Champions: Victoria (28th title)
- Participants: 6
- Matches: 30, plus final
- Player of the series: Chris Hartley (Queensland)
- Most runs: David Hussey (Victoria) 970 runs
- Most wickets: Ben Cutting (Queensland) 46 wickets

The 2009–10 Sheffield Shield season is the 108th season of official first-class domestic cricket in Australia. The season began on 13 October 2009. The Victorian Bushrangers were the winners of the competition, defeating the Queensland Bulls by 459 runs in the final held from 17 to 21 March 2010 at the Melbourne Cricket Ground

== Table ==
The top two teams after each round is played will compete for the Sheffield Shield final. The match will be contested at the home ground of the side that finishes first. In the result of a draw, the team that finished on top of the ladder, and hence hosting the match will be awarded the title. For an explanation of how points are awarded, see Sheffield Shield Points System.

Team	Pts	Pld	W	D	L	For		Against		Quo
Victoria	41	10	6	3	1	141	5245	164	5148	1.19
Queensland	32	10	5	3	2	159	4801	154	4647	1.00
New South Wales	26	10	4	3	3	126	5620	159	5096	1.39
Western Australia	20	10	2	2	6	160	5011	152	4836	0.98
Tasmania	17	10	2	4	4	168	4819	136	5390	0.74
South Australia	16	10	2	3	5	142	4852	131	5331	0.84

Last Updated on 15 March 2010.

== Teams ==
Club	Home Ground	Captain
New South Wales Blues	Sydney Cricket Ground	Simon Katich
Queensland Bulls	Brisbane Cricket Ground	Chris Simpson
Southern Redbacks	Adelaide Oval	Graham Manou
Tasmanian Tigers	Bellerive Oval	Daniel Marsh
Victorian Bushrangers	Melbourne Cricket Ground	Cameron White
Western Warriors	WACA Ground	Marcus North

== Fixtures ==
=== October ===
13–16 Oct 2009
Scorecard
Bulletin

Tasmania	v	South Australia (H)
236 (102.5 overs); Brady Jones 45* (87); Chris Duval 2/39 (24)		345 (102.4 overs); James Smith 116 (189); Jason Krejza 4/70 (29)
184 (94.4 overs); George Bailey 90 (181); Daniel Christian 4/31 (21.4)		1/76 (20.2 overs); James Smith 57 (61); Brett Geeves 1/12 (8)

South Australia won by 9 wickets
Adelaide Oval, Adelaide
Umpires: Gerard Abood & Simon Fry
Player of the match: James Smith

13–16 Oct 2009
Scorecard
Bulletin

(H) Western Australia	v	Queensland
9/406 dec. (148 overs); Marcus North 107 (167); Scott Walter 6/121 (39)		458 (167 overs); Ryan Broad 103 (253); Marcus North 2/82 (36)
1/132 (52 overs); Wes Robinson 67 (148); Glen Batticciotto 1/37 (15)

Match Drawn
WACA Ground, Perth
Umpires: Ian Lock & Mick Martel
Player of the match: Ryan Broad

30 Oct – 3 Nov 2009
Scorecard
Bulletin

(H) South Australia	v	Victoria
292 (92 overs); Tim Ludeman 62 (82); Clint McKay 3/49 (19)		9/643 dec. (147.1 overs); Brad Hodge 195 (256); Cullen Bailey 3/113 (22.1)
3/340 (129 overs); Daniel Harris 166* (392); John Hastings 1/27 (18)

Match Drawn
Adelaide Oval, Adelaide
Umpires: Geoff Joshua & Rod Tucker
Player of the match: Brad Hodge

=== November ===
1–4 Nov 2009
Scorecard
Bulletin

Tasmania	v	Queensland (H)
156 (63 overs); Brett Geeves 40 (98); Scott Walter 4/30 (16)		382 (126.1 overs); Glen Batticciotto 101 (241); Brett Geeves 5/106 (32)
219 (103.3 overs); Alex Doolan 59 (140); Ben Cutting 6/37 (23)

Queensland won by an innings and 7 runs
Brisbane Cricket Ground, Brisbane
Umpires: Paul Reiffel & Tony Ward
Player of the match: Ben Cutting

3–6 Nov 2009
Scorecard
Bulletin

Western Australia	v	New South Wales (H)
8/499 dec. (122.2 overs); Luke Ronchi 148 (154); Steven Smith 3/164 (34.1)		402 (133.1 overs); Simon Katich 108 (199); Marcus North 4/82 (33.1)
2/24 (7 overs); Wes Robinson 17 (20); Beau Casson 2/1 (2)

Match Drawn
Sydney Cricket Ground, Sydney
Umpires: Jeff Brookes & Bob Parry
Player of the match: Wes Robinson

8–11 Nov 2009
Scorecard
Bulletin

(H) South Australia	v	Queensland
5/477 dec. (142 overs); Cameron Borgas 164 (260); Chris Swan 2/58 (21)		308 (120.3 overs); Chris Hartley 68 (160); Aaron O'Brien 3/66 (35)
2/159 dec. (26 overs); Michael Klinger 92 (79); Ben Cutting 1/46 (7)		5/228 (86 overs); Ryan Broad 60 (170); Jake Haberfield 3/52 (15)

Match Drawn
Adelaide Oval, Adelaide
Umpires: Mick Martell & John Ward
Player of the match: Cameron Borgas

17–20 Nov 2009
Scorecard

(H) New South Wales	v	Tasmania
8/420 dec. (131.5 overs); Michael Clarke 106 (181); Daniel Marsh 2/50 (16.5 overs)		482 (153.5 overs); Daniel Marsh 134 (229); Stuart Clark 3/67 (29 overs)
5/208 (63 overs); Phillip Hughes 79 (150); Jason Krejza 2/80 (26 overs)

Match Drawn
Sydney Cricket Ground, Sydney
Umpires: Simon Fry and Bob Parry
Player of the match: Daniel Marsh

17–20 Nov 2009
Scorecard

Western Australia	v	Victoria (H)
277 (96.4 overs); Adam Voges 114 (231); Bryce McGain 4/41 (21 overs)		246 (87.1 overs); Cameron White 74 (123); Michael Hogan 3/29 (13 overs)
227 (76.0 overs); Luke Towers 49 (122); Andrew McDonald 3/22 (19 overs)		3/259 (75.3 overs); Chris Rogers 110 (198); Brett Dorey 1/24 (12 overs)

Victoria won by 7 wickets
Melbourne Cricket Ground, Melbourne
Umpires: Ian Lock and Geoff Joshua
Player of the match: Chris Rogers

24–27 Nov 2009
Scorecard

(H) Tasmania	v	South Australia
389 (113.5 overs); Ed Cowan 225 (324); Peter George 8/84 (28 overs)		363 (127.2 overs); Cameron Borgas 78 (161); Tim MacDonald 3/65 (25.0 overs)
4/129 (51.0 overs); George Bailey 64*; Peter George 3/47 (19 overs)

Match Drawn
Bellerive Oval, Hobart
Umpires: Mick Martell and John Ward
Player of the match: Ed Cowan

27–30 Nov 2009
Scorecard

(H) Victoria	v	Queensland
378 (87.3 overs); David Hussey 174 (183); Ben Cutting 4/60 (20.3 overs)		195 (58.4 overs); Nathan Reardon 58 (102); Clint McKay 3/60 (15 overs)
		133 (54.3 overs); Lee Carseldine 27 (59); John Hastings 4/30 (10 overs)

Victoria won by an innings and 50 runs
Melbourne Cricket Ground, Melbourne
Umpires: Steve Davis and Tony Ward
Player of the match: David Hussey

27–30 Nov 2009
Scorecard

(H) Western Australia	v	New South Wales
131 (40.2 overs); Mitchell Marsh 59 (70); Doug Bollinger 3/33 (10.2 overs)		274 (82.5 overs); Phillip Hughes 58 (65); Brad Knowles 4/99 (20.5 overs)
245 (65.4 overs); Shaun Marsh 94 (145); Doug Bollinger 5/68 (15.4 overs)		2/106 (25.5 overs); Phil Jaques 54 (73); Justin Coetzee 1/18 (2 overs)

New South Wales won by 8 wickets
WACA Ground, Perth
Umpires: Bruce Oxenford and Paul Wilson
Player of the match: Doug Bollinger

=== December ===
8–11 Dec 2009
Scorecard

Western Australia	v	Tasmania (H)
8/442 dec. (147.4 overs); Luke Towers 124 (286); Brett Geeves 3/90 (28 overs)		5/296 dec. (90.2 overs); Alex Doolan 135 (212); Adam Voges 3/38 (10.2 overs)
4/201 dec. (54 overs); Adam Voges 90* (130); Brett Geeves 2/50 (14 overs)		9/351 (85 overs); Ed Cowan 152 (227); Michael Hogan 3/64 (18 overs)

Tasmania won by 1 wicket
Bellerive Oval, Hobart
Umpires: Jeff Brookes and Ian Lock
Player of the match: Ed Cowan

10–13 Dec 2009
Scorecard

South Australia	v	Victoria (H)
6/517 dec. (151 overs); Michael Klinger 207* (367); John Hastings 2/68 (29 overs)		6/246 dec. (88 overs); Nick Jewell 70 (196); Aaron O'Brien 2/55 (15 overs)
2/109 dec. (28.2 overs); Mark Cosgrove 44* (56); John Hastings 2/29 (6 overs)		4/384 (94.4 overs); Nick Jewell 96 (158); Peter George 2/78 (23 overs)

Victoria won by 6 wickets
Melbourne Cricket Ground, Melbourne
Umpires: Gerard Abood and Bob Parry
Player of the match: Michael Klinger

11–14 Dec 2009
Scorecard

New South Wales	v	Queensland (H)
5/451 dec. (121.2 overs); Usman Khawaja 132* (236); Chris Simpson 3/98 (36.2 overs)		468 (105.5 overs); Chris Hartley 125 (207); Mitchell Starc 5/74 (17.5 overs)
184 (62.2 overs); Daniel Smith 58 (97); James Hopes 3/39 (14 overs)		1/168 (34.3 overs); Wade Townsend 72* (104)

Queensland won by 9 wickets
Brisbane Cricket Ground, Brisbane
Umpires: Simon Fry and Paul Reiffel
Player of the match: Chris Hartley

18–21 Dec 2009
Scorecard

(H) New South Wales	v	Victoria
8/390 dec. (106 overs); Phillip Hughes 122 (179); Andrew McDonald 3/55 (25 overs)		311 (107.1 overs); John Hastings 84 (142); Moises Henriques 3/69 (20 overs)
3/306 dec. (56.5 overs); Phil Jaques 131 (141); John Hastings 1/28 (10 overs)		5/144 (37.2 overs); Chris Rogers 94 (115); Grant Lambert 3/27 (10 overs)

Match Drawn
Newcastle Number 1 Sports Ground, Newcastle
Umpires: Mick Martell and Bruce Oxenford
Player of the match: Phillip Hughes

- No play possible on first day due to rain.

18–21 Dec 2009
Scorecard

Western Australia	v	South Australia (H)
401 (119 overs); Shaun Marsh 82 (165); Cullen Bailey 4/62 (27 overs)		6/249 dec. (101 overs); Michael Klinger 109* (287); Aaron Heal 2/55 (24 overs)
2/198 dec. (52.4 overs); Shaun Marsh 108* (140); Peter George 2/13 (8 overs)		246 (92 overs); Michael Klinger 60 (136); Brad Knowles 4/33 (14 overs)

Western Australia won by 104 runs
Adelaide Oval, Adelaide
Umpires: Simon Fry and Geoff Joshua
Player of the match: Shaun Marsh

=== Mid Season Break ===
There is a break in the regular schedule of first class games to allow for the 2009–10 KFC Twenty20 Big Bash competition.

=== January ===
29 Jan – 1 Feb 2010
Scorecard

Victoria	v	Tasmania (H)
297 (100 overs); John Hastings 93 (212); Brett Geeves 3/61 (23 overs)		262 (95.4 overs); Tim Paine 64 (83); James Pattinson 4/52 (21.4 overs)
340 (95.4 overs); Rob Quiney 153 (212); Luke Butterworth 4/57 (16 overs)		5/207 (72 overs); Ed Cowan 108 (221); Damien Wright 4/42 (21 overs)

Match Drawn
Bellerive Oval, Hobart
Umpires: Steven John and Ian Lock
Player of the match: Damien Wright

29 Jan – 1 Feb 2010
Scorecard

Queensland	v	New South Wales (H)
335 (96.4 overs); Lee Carseldine 109 (180); Trent Copeland 8/92 (28.4 overs)		243 (74.2 overs); Peter Forrest 62 (158); Ben Cutting 5/82 (16 overs)
252 (65.1 overs); Ryan Broad 129 (198); Grant Lambert 3/102 (21 overs)		176 (57.5 overs); Simon Katich 55 (123); Luke Feldman 5/32 (17 overs)

Queensland won by 168 runs
Sydney Cricket Ground, Sydney
Umpires: Gerard Abood and John Ward
Player of the match: Luke Feldman

=== February ===
8–11 Feb 2010
Scorecard
Bulletin

Queensland	v	Tasmania (H)
326 (112 overs); Wade Townsend 121 (258); Adam Griffith 5/85 (30 overs)		427 (117.2 overs); George Bailey 115 (167); Ben Cutting 6/90 (28 overs)
338 (113 overs); Chris Hartley 112 (255); Brendan Drew 4/81 (25 overs)		5/121 (33 overs); Daniel Marsh 49* (73); Ben Cutting 2/16 (17 overs)

Match Drawn
Bellerive Oval, Hobart
Umpires: Steven John and Rod Tucker
Player of the match: Chris Hartley

8–11 Feb 2010
Scorecard
Bulletin

(H) Western Australia	v	South Australia
284 (81.5 overs); Adam Voges 54 (85); Daniel Christian 4/63 (20 Overs)		9/380 dec. (127.2 overs); James Smith 78 (227); Michael Hogan 5/83 (32 overs)
189 (63 overs); Wes Robinson 43 (97); Daniel Christian 5/24 (13 overs)		8/94 (31.5 overs); Daniel Harris 17 (52); Brad Knowles 4/32 (7 overs)

South Australia won by 2 Wickets
WACA Ground, Perth
Umpires: Ian Lock and Paul Wilson
Player of the match: Daniel Christian

12–15 Feb 2010
Scorecard

New South Wales	v	Victoria (H)
225 (100.1 overs); Peter Forest 58 (188); Damien Wright 5/37 (25 overs)		418 (114 overs); Andrew McDonald 120 (186); Trent Copeland 3/93 (35 overs)
387 (93.2 overs); Phillip Hughes 149 (170); Steve Smith 124 (184); Andrew McDonald 3/51 (15 overs)		4/200 (50.5 overs); David Hussey 79 (82); Trent Copeland 2/56 (18 overs)

Victoria won by 6 wickets
Melbourne Cricket Ground, Melbourne
Umpires: Marais Erasmus and Mick Martell
Player of the match: Andrew McDonald

19–22 Feb 2010
Scorecard

New South Wales	v	South Australia (H)
6/566 dec. (129.5 overs); Phillip Hughes 192 (259); Peter Forrest 141 (184); Ben Rohrer 115* (119); Peter George 3/89 (30 overs)		288 (119.5 overs); Michael Klinger 63 (127); Trent Copeland 3/70 (32 overs); Stephen O'Keefe 3/98 (42.5 overs)
		103 (52.1 overs); Aaron O'Brian 34 (89); Trent Copeland 5/31 (18.1 overs)

New South Wales won by an innings and 174 runs
Adelaide Oval, Adelaide
Umpires: Jeff Brookes & Tony Ward
Player of the match: Phillip Hughes

19–22 Feb 2010
Scorecard

Tasmania	v	Western Australia (H)
261 (101.5 overs); George Bailey 58 (100); Steve Magoffin 6/44 (27.5 overs)		233 (68 overs); Liam Davis 67 (127); Tim MacDonald 2/27 (11 overs)
246 (93 overs); Daniel Marsh 60 (118); Brad Knowles 3/60 (18 overs)		204 (73.1 overs); Michael Swart 83 (149); Brenden Drew 3/50 (14.1 overs)

Tasmania won by 70 runs
WACA Ground, Perth
Umpires: Geoff Joshua and Bob Parry
Player of the match: Ed Cowan

22–25 Feb 2010
Scorecard

Victoria	v	Queensland (H)
316 (113 overs); Matthew Wade 84 (146); James Hopes 5/66 (30 overs)		170 (67.4 overs); Chris Hartley 47 (106); Damien Wright 3/41 (15.4 overs)
104 (37.2 overs); John Hastings 49 (72); Luke Feldman 3/25 (9 overs)		9/252 (76.5 overs); Chris Hartley 45 (91); Andrew McDonald 3/44 (8 overs)

Queensland won by 1 wicket
Brisbane Cricket Ground, Brisbane
Umpires: Marais Erasmus and Simon Fry
Player of the match: Chris Hartley

=== March ===
3–6 Mar 2010
Scorecard

New South Wales	v	Tasmania (H)
6/468 dec. (123.3 overs); Steve Smith 177 (247); Xavier Doherty 2 /102 (35 overs)		303 (110.1 overs); Alex Doolan 100 (164); Trent Copeland 5/56 (31.1 overs)
4/256 (54); Usman Khawaja 89 (107); Xavier Doherty 3/80 (14 overs)		214 (44.2 overs); James Faukner 59* (53); Mitchell Starc (4/51 12.2 overs)

New South Wales won by 216 runs
Bellerive Oval, Hobart
Umpires: Bob Parry and John Ward
Player of the match: Steve Smith

3–6 Mar 2010
Scorecard

(H) Queensland	v	South Australia
160 (45.2 overs); Nathan Rimmington 32 (40); Gary Putland 4/55 (15 overs)		72 (30.3 overs); Tim Ludeman20 (31); Chris Swan 5/26 (10.3 overs)
6/237 dec. (65 overs); Wade Townsend 114* (190); Gary Putland 3/39 (15 overs)		231 (77.5 overs); Daniel Harris 62 (160); Luke Feldman 4/63 (22 overs)

Queensland won by 94 runs
Brisbane Cricket Ground, Brisbane
Umpires: Mick Martel and Paul Reiffel
Player of the match: Luke Feldman

3–6 Mar 2010
Scorecard

Victoria	v	Western Australia (H)
199 (60.5 overs); Nick Jewell 55 (102); Brad Knowles 3/66 (13.5 overs)		274 (95 overs); Luke Pomersbach 74 (131); Damien Wright 3/72 (28 overs)
378 (103.4 overs); Matthew Wade 91 (130); Steve Magoffin 2/85 (27 overs)		249 (83.1 overs); Luke Ronchi 115 (136); Andrew McDonald 4/66 (20 overs)

Victoria won by 54 runs
WACA Ground, Perth
Umpires: Simon Fry and Bruce Oxenford
Player of the match: Damien Wright

10–13 Mar 2010
Scorecard

(H) New South Wales	v	South Australia
9/550 dec. (135.4 overs); Peter Nevill 105 (172); Usman Khawaja 102 (138); Steve Smith 100 (128); Mark Cleary 4/82 (28.4 overs)		267 (93.1 overs); Cameron Borgas 62 (143); Trent Copeland 4/55 (25.1 overs)
		244 (54 overs); Mark Cosgrove 100 (115); Steve Smith 7/64 (16)

New South Wales won by an innings and 39 runs
Sydney Cricket Ground, Sydney
Umpires: Ian Lock and Bruce Oxenford
Player of the match: Steve Smith

10–13 Mar 2010
Scorecard

Western Australia	v	Queensland (H)
286 (70.3 overs); Luke Pomersbach 74 (83); Luke Feldman 4/79 (18 overs)		106 (39.1 overs); Craig Philipson 30 (55); Nathan Coulter-Nile 3/11 (9 overs)
109 (26.1 overs); Luke Ronchi 49* (53); Chris Swan 3/35 (9 overs)		285 (85.1 overs); Chris Lynn 139 (194); Steve Magoffin 5/27 (18.1 overs)

Western Australia won by 3 wickets
Brisbane Cricket Ground, Brisbane
Umpires: Simon Fry and Bob Parry
Player of the match: Steve Magoffin

10–13 Mar 2010
Scorecard

Tasmania	v	Victoria (H)
222 (90.2 overs); Tim Paine 69 (156); Damien Wright 5/49 (22.2 overs)		382 (106.2 overs); David Hussey 140 (189); Aaron Finch 102 (158); Xavier Doherty 3/41 (19.2 overs)
114 (51.2 overs); Brendan Drew 40 (49); Darren Pattinsen 3/15 (12 overs)

Victoria won by an innings and 46 runs
Melbourne Cricket Ground, Melbourne
Umpires: Paul Reiffel and John Ward
Player of the match: Damien Wright

== Final ==
19–23 Mar 2010
Scorecard

(H) Victoria	v	Queensland
305 (98.5 overs); Matthew Wade 96 (207); John Hastings 47 (116); Damien Wright 42 (53); Chris Swan 3/65 (24 overs)		257 (97.4 overs); Ryan Broad 82 (206); Chris Lynn 40 (63); Ben Cutting 35* (74); Andrew McDonald 3/64 (26.3 overs)
8/591 dec. (146 overs); David Hussey 168 (198); Cameron White 89 (165); Rob Quiney 73 (112); Cameron Boyce 6/181 (44 overs)		182 (58.4 overs); Lee Carseldine 75 (121); Bryce McGain 4/70 (25.4 overs); John Hastings 3/25 (10 overs)

Victoria won by 457 runs
Melbourne Cricket Ground, Melbourne
Umpires: Simon Fry and Bruce Oxenford
Player of the match: Matthew Wade

- Rain delayed the start of play on day 3, but no time was lost.

== Statistics ==
=== Most Runs ===
Player	Team	Matches	Innings	Runs	Average	HS	100s	50s
David Hussey	Victoria	10	17	970	57.05	174	3	5
Ed Cowan	Tasmania	10	19	957	53.16	225	3	3
Phillip Hughes	New South Wales	10	17	953	56.05	192	3	5
Michael Klinger	South Australia	10	19	886	63.28	207*	2	5
Chris Hartley	Queensland	11	19	827	48.64	125	2	4

Last Updated on 22 March 2010

=== Most Wickets ===
Player	Team	Matches	Overs	Wickets	Average	BBI	5W
Ben Cutting	Queensland	11	335.3	46	23.91	6/37	3
John Hastings	Victoria	11	337.2	36	26.13	4/30	0
Peter George	South Australia	10	364.5	36	30.44	8/84	1
Damien Wright	Victoria	6	218.3	35	14.34	5/37	2
Trent Copeland	New South Wales	5	234.1	35	17.57	8/92	3

Last Updated on 22 March 2010

== See also ==
- 2009–10 Australian cricket season
