= 2011 Champions League Twenty20 squads =

This is a list of the squads that qualified for the 2011 Champions League Twenty20.

== Southern Redbacks ==
Coach: (Australia) Darren Berry

| No. | Player | Nat | Date of birth | Batting | Bowling style |
|---|---|---|---|---|---|
| 18 | Michael Klinger (c) | (Australia) | 4 June 1980 (aged 31) | Right | — |
| 23 | Cameron Borgas | (Australia) | 1 September 1983 (aged 28) | Right | Right arm off break |
| 45 | Daniel Christian | (Australia) | 4 May 1983 (aged 28) | Right | Right arm medium-fast |
| 26 | Tom Cooper | (Australia) | 26 November 1986 (aged 24) | Right | Right arm off break |
| 12 | Callum Ferguson | (Australia) | 21 November 1984 (aged 26) | Right | Right arm medium pace |
| 29 | Daniel Harris | (Australia) | 31 December 1979 (aged 31) | Right | Right arm medium pace |
| 22 | Tim Ludeman (wk) | (Australia) | 23 June 1987 (aged 24) | Right | — |
| 17 | Nathan Lyon | (Australia) | 20 November 1987 (aged 23) | Right | Right arm off break |
| 11 | Aaron O'Brien | (Australia) | 2 October 1981 (aged 29) | Left | Slow left-arm orthodox |
| 10 | Gary Putland | (Australia) | 10 February 1986 (aged 25) | Right | Left arm fast-medium |
| — | Adil Rashid | (England) | 17 February 1988 (aged 23) | Right | Right arm leg break |
| 47 | Kane Richardson | (Australia) | 12 February 1991 (aged 20) | Right | Right arm fast-medium |
| — | Chadd Sayers | (Australia) | 31 August 1987 (aged 24) | Right | Right arm medium pace |
| 19 | James Smith | (Australia) | 11 October 1988 (aged 22) | Right | Right arm off break |
| 32 | Shaun Tait | (Australia) | 22 February 1983 (aged 28) | Right | Right arm fast |

== New South Wales Blues ==
Coach: (Australia) Anthony Stuart

| No. | Player | Nat | Date of birth | Batting | Bowling style |
|---|---|---|---|---|---|
| 37 | Simon Katich (c) | (Australia) | 21 August 1975 (aged 36) | Left | Slow left-arm wrist-spin |
| 10 | Stuart Clark | (Australia) | 28 September 1975 (aged 35) | Right | Right arm fast-medium |
| 27 | Patrick Cummins | (Australia) | 8 May 1993 (aged 18) | Right | Right arm fast |
| 43 | Nathan Hauritz | (Australia) | 18 October 1981 (aged 29) | Right | Right arm off spin |
| 8 | Josh Hazlewood | (Australia) | 8 January 1991 (aged 20) | Left | Right arm fast |
| 21 | Moisés Henriques | (Australia) | 1 February 1987 (aged 24) | Right | Right arm fast-medium |
| 22 | Phillip Hughes | (Australia) | 30 November 1988 (aged 22) | Left | Right arm off break |
| 53 | Nic Maddinson | (Australia) | 21 December 1991 (aged 19) | Left | Slow left-arm orthodox |
| 72 | Stephen O'Keefe | (Australia) | 9 December 1984 (aged 26) | Right | Slow left-arm orthodox |
| 99 | Ben Rohrer | (Australia) | 26 March 1981 (aged 30) | Left | — |
| — | Daniel Smith (wk) | (Australia) | 17 March 1982 (aged 29) | Right | — |
| 19 | Steve Smith | (Australia) | 2 June 1989 (aged 22) | Right | Right arm leg break |
| 56 | Mitchell Starc | (Australia) | 30 January 1990 (aged 21) | Left | Left arm fast-medium |
| 31 | David Warner | (Australia) | 27 November 1986 (aged 24) | Left | Right arm leg spin |
| 17 | Shane Watson | (Australia) | 17 June 1981 (aged 30) | Right | Right arm medium-fast |

== Warriors ==
Coach: (South Africa) Russell Domingo

| No. | Player | Nat | Date of birth | Batting | Bowling style |
|---|---|---|---|---|---|
| 22 | Johan Botha (c) | (South Africa) | 2 May 1982 (aged 29) | Right | Right arm off break |
| — | Andrew Birch | (South Africa) | 7 June 1985 (aged 26) | Right | Right arm medium-fast |
| 34 | Nicky Boje | (South Africa) | 20 March 1973 (aged 38) | Left | Slow left-arm orthodox |
| 9 | Mark Boucher (wk) | (South Africa) | 3 December 1976 (aged 34) | Right | — |
| 41 | Colin Ingram | (South Africa) | 3 July 1985 (aged 26) | Left | Left arm leg spin |
| 77 | Justin Kreusch | (South Africa) | 27 September 1979 (aged 31) | Right | Right arm medium pace |
| — | Lyall Meyer | (South Africa) | 23 March 1982 (aged 29) | Left | Right arm fast |
| 16 | Makhaya Ntini | (South Africa) | 6 July 1977 (aged 34) | Right | Right arm fast |
| 36 | Wayne Parnell | (South Africa) | 30 July 1989 (aged 22) | Left | Left arm fast-medium |
| 5 | Ashwell Prince | (South Africa) | 28 May 1977 (aged 34) | Left | Right arm off break |
| 21 | Jon-Jon Smuts | (South Africa) | 21 August 1988 (aged 23) | Right | Slow left-arm orthodox |
| — | Kelly Smuts | (South Africa) | 22 January 1990 (aged 21) | Left | Right arm medium pace |
| 23 | Rusty Theron | (South Africa) | 24 July 1985 (aged 26) | Right | Right arm medium-fast |
| 10 | Craig Thyssen | (South Africa) | 25 March 1984 (aged 27) | Right | Right arm medium-fast |
| 64 | Lonwabo Tsotsobe | (South Africa) | 7 March 1984 (aged 27) | Right | Left arm fast-medium |

== Cape Cobras ==
Coach: (South Africa) Richard Pybus

| No. | Player | Nat | Date of birth | Batting | Bowling style |
|---|---|---|---|---|---|
| 34 | Justin Kemp (c) | (South Africa) | 24 March 1979 (aged 32) | Right | Right arm medium-fast |
| 21 | JP Duminy | (South Africa) | 14 April 1984 (aged 27) | Left | Right-arm off break |
| 11 | Herschelle Gibbs | (South Africa) | 23 February 1974 (aged 37) | Right | Right-arm off break |
| 9 | Rory Kleinveldt | (South Africa) | 15 March 1983 (aged 28) | Right | Right-arm medium-fast |
| 67 | Charl Langeveldt | (South Africa) | 17 December 1974 (aged 36) | Right | Right-arm fast-medium |
| 88 | Richard Levi | (South Africa) | 14 January 1988 (aged 23) | Right | Right-arm medium pace |
| 10 | Johann Louw | (South Africa) | 12 April 1979 (aged 32) | Right | Right-arm medium-fast |
| 28 | Justin Ontong | (South Africa) | 4 January 1980 (aged 31) | Right | Right-arm off break |
| 5 | Robin Peterson | (South Africa) | 4 August 1979 (aged 32) | Left | Slow left-arm orthodox |
| 24 | Vernon Philander | (South Africa) | 24 June 1985 (aged 26) | Right | Right-arm fast |
| 4 | Andrew Puttick | (South Africa) | 11 December 1980 (aged 30) | Left | — |
| — | Michael Rippon | (South Africa) | 14 September 1991 (aged 20) | Right | Slow left-arm wrist-spin |
| 3 | Owais Shah | (England) | 22 October 1978 (aged 32) | Right | Right-arm off break |
| 8 | Dale Steyn | (South Africa) | 27 June 1983 (aged 28) | Right | Right-arm fast |
| 44 | Dane Vilas (wk) | (South Africa) | 10 June 1985 (aged 26) | Right | — |

== Mumbai Indians ==
Coach: (India) Robin Singh

| No. | Player | Nat | Date of birth | Batting | Bowling style |
|---|---|---|---|---|---|
| 3 | Harbhajan Singh (c) | (India) | 3 July 1980 (aged 31) | Right | Right arm off break |
| 6 | Aiden Blizzard | (Australia) | 27 June 1984 (aged 27) | Left | Left arm medium pace |
| 56 | Yuzvendra Chahal | (India) | 23 July 1990 (aged 21) | Right | Right arm leg spin |
| 26 | Dilhara Fernando | (Sri Lanka) | 19 July 1979 (aged 32) | Right | Right arm fast-medium |
| 7 | James Franklin | (New Zealand) | 7 November 1980 (aged 30) | Left | Left arm fast-medium |
| 82 | Davy Jacobs | (South Africa) | 4 November 1982 (aged 28) | Right | — |
| 88 | Sarul Kanwar | (India) | 9 November 1987 (aged 23) | Right | Right arm off-break |
| 99 | Lasith Malinga | (Sri Lanka) | 28 August 1983 (aged 28) | Right | Right arm fast |
| 14 | Abu Nechim | (India) | 5 September 1988 (aged 23) | Right | Right arm medium-fast |
| 55 | Kieron Pollard | (Trinidad and Tobago) | 12 May 1987 (aged 24) | Right | Right arm medium-fast |
| 90 | Ambati Rayudu (wk) | (India) | 23 September 1985 (aged 26) | Right | Right arm off break |
| 2 | Tirumalasetti Suman | (India) | 15 December 1983 (aged 27) | Right | Right arm off break |
| 63 | Andrew Symonds | (Australia) | 9 June 1975 (aged 36) | Right | Right arm medium |

== Royal Challengers Bangalore ==
Coach: (South Africa) Ray Jennings

| No. | Player | Nat | Date of birth | Batting | Bowling style |
|---|---|---|---|---|---|
| 11 | Daniel Vettori (c) | (New Zealand) | 27 January 1979 (aged 32) | Left | Slow left-arm orthodox |
| 14 | Mayank Agarwal | (India) | 16 February 1991 (aged 20) | Right | — |
| 37 | Sreenath Aravind | (India) | 8 April 1984 (aged 27) | Left | Left arm medium-fast |
| 37 | Raju Bhatkal | (India) | 1 September 1985 (aged 26) | Right | Right arm medium pace |
| 23 | Tillakaratne Dilshan | (Sri Lanka) | 14 October 1976 (aged 34) | Right | Right arm off break |
| 333 | Chris Gayle | (Jamaica) | 21 September 1979 (aged 32) | Left | Right arm off break |
| 2 | Mohammad Kaif | (India) | 1 December 1980 (aged 30) | Right | Right arm off break |
| 21 | Arun Karthik | (India) | 15 February 1986 (aged 25) | Right | Right arm leg spin |
| 5 | Virat Kohli | (India) | 5 November 1988 (aged 22) | Right | Right arm medium pace |
| 61 | Abhimanyu Mithun | (India) | 25 October 1989 (aged 21) | Right | Right arm medium pace |
| 8 | Syed Mohammad | (India) | 3 June 1983 (aged 28) | Left | Slow left-arm orthodox |
| 26 | Dirk Nannes | (Australia) | 16 May 1976 (aged 35) | Right | Left arm fast-medium |
| 7 | Asad Pathan | (India) | 17 June 1984 (aged 27) | Right | Right arm medium pace |
| 15 | Saurabh Tiwary | (India) | 30 December 1989 (aged 21) | Left | — |
| 17 | AB de Villiers (wk) | (South Africa) | 17 February 1984 (aged 27) | Right | Right arm medium pace |

== Chennai Super Kings ==
Coach: (New Zealand) Stephen Fleming

| No. | Player | Nat | Date of birth | Batting | Bowling style |
|---|---|---|---|---|---|
| 7 | Mahendra Singh Dhoni (c & wk) | (India) | 7 July 1981 (aged 30) | Right | Right arm medium pace |
| 99 | Ravichandran Ashwin | (India) | 17 September 1986 (aged 25) | Right | Right arm off break |
| 33 | Subramaniam Badrinath | (India) | 30 August 1980 (aged 31) | Right | Right arm off break |
| 4 | Doug Bollinger | (Australia) | 24 July 1981 (aged 30) | Left | Left arm fast-medium |
| 47 | Dwayne Bravo | (Trinidad and Tobago) | 7 October 1983 (aged 27) | Right | Right arm medium-fast |
| 48 | Michael Hussey | (Australia) | 27 May 1975 (aged 36) | Left | Right arm medium pace |
| 27 | Shadab Jakati | (India) | 27 November 1980 (aged 30) | Left | Slow left-arm orthodox |
| 81 | Albie Morkel | (South Africa) | 10 June 1981 (aged 30) | Left | Right arm medium-fast |
| 3 | Suresh Raina | (India) | 27 November 1986 (aged 24) | Left | Right arm off break |
| 88 | Suraj Randiv | (Sri Lanka) | 30 January 1985 (aged 26) | Right | Right arm off break |
| 6 | Wriddhiman Saha | (India) | 24 October 1984 (aged 26) | Right | — |
| 38 | Tim Southee | (New Zealand) | 11 December 1988 (aged 22) | Right | Right arm medium-fast |
| 77 | Anirudha Srikkanth | (India) | 14 April 1987 (aged 24) | Right | — |
| 56 | Scott Styris | (New Zealand) | 10 July 1975 (aged 36) | Right | Right arm medium pace |
| 8 | Murali Vijay | (India) | 1 April 1984 (aged 27) | Right | Right arm off break |

== Kolkata Knight Riders ==
Coach: (Australia) Dav Whatmore

| No. | Player | Nat | Date of birth | Batting | Bowling style |
|---|---|---|---|---|---|
| 3 | Jacques Kallis (c) | (South Africa) | 16 October 1975 (aged 35) | Right | Right arm fast-medium |
| 21 | Iqbal Abdullah | (India) | 2 December 1989 (aged 21) | Left | Slow left-arm orthodox |
| 14 | Mohammed Shami | (India) | 9 March 1990 (aged 21) | Right | Right arm medium pace |
| 55 | Lakshmipathy Balaji | (India) | 27 September 1981 (aged 29) | Right | Right arm medium-fast |
| 22 | Rajat Bhatia | (India) | 22 October 1979 (aged 31) | Right | Right arm medium-fast |
| 36 | Manvinder Bisla (wk) | (India) | 27 December 1984 (aged 26) | Right | — |
| 27 | Ryan ten Doeschate | (Netherlands) | 30 June 1980 (aged 31) | Right | Right arm medium-fast |
| 5 | Gautam Gambhir | (India) | 14 October 1981 (aged 29) | Left | Right arm leg break |
| 24 | Brad Haddin | (Australia) | 23 October 1977 (aged 33) | Right | — |
| 75 | Shakib Al Hasan | (Bangladesh) | 24 March 1987 (aged 24) | Left | Slow left-arm orthodox |
| 3 | Brett Lee | (Australia) | 8 November 1976 (aged 34) | Right | Right arm fast |
| 16 | Eoin Morgan | (Republic of Ireland) | 10 September 1986 (aged 25) | Left | Right arm medium pace |
| 28 | Yusuf Pathan | (India) | 17 November 1982 (aged 28) | Right | Right arm off break |
| 9 | Manoj Tiwary | (India) | 14 November 1985 (aged 25) | Right | Right arm leg break |
| 99 | Jaydev Unadkat | (India) | 18 October 1991 (aged 19) | Right | Left arm medium pace |

== Auckland Aces ==
Coach: (Zimbabwe) Paul Strang

| No. | Player | Nat | Date of birth | Batting | Bowling style |
|---|---|---|---|---|---|
| 48 | Gareth Hopkins (c & wk) | (New Zealand) | 24 November 1976 (aged 34) | Right | — |
| 11 | James Adams | (England) | 23 September 1980 (aged 31) | Left | Left arm medium pace |
| 9 | Andre Adams | (New Zealand) | 17 July 1975 (aged 36) | Right | Right arm fast-medium |
| 1 | Michael Bates | (New Zealand) | 11 October 1983 (aged 27) | Right | Left arm medium-fast |
| 22 | Colin de Grandhomme | (Zimbabwe) | 22 July 1986 (aged 25) | Right | Right arm fast-medium |
| 31 | Martin Guptill | (New Zealand) | 30 September 1986 (aged 24) | Right | Right arm off spin |
| 16 | Roneel Hira | (New Zealand) | 23 June 1987 (aged 24) | Left | Slow left-arm orthodox |
| 6 | Anaru Kitchen | (New Zealand) | 21 February 1984 (aged 27) | Right | Slow left-arm orthodox |
| 32 | Chris Martin | (New Zealand) | 10 December 1974 (aged 36) | Right | Right arm fast-medium |
| — | Bruce Martin | (New Zealand) | 25 April 1980 (aged 31) | Right | Slow left-arm orthodox |
| 37 | Kyle Mills | (New Zealand) | 15 March 1979 (aged 32) | Right | Right arm fast-medium |
| 18 | Colin Munro | (New Zealand) | 11 March 1987 (aged 24) | Left | Right arm medium-fast |
| — | Robert Quiney | (Australia) | 20 August 1982 (aged 29) | Left | Right arm medium pace |
| 14 | Daryl Tuffey | (New Zealand) | 11 June 1978 (aged 33) | Right | Right arm fast-medium |
| 10 | Lou Vincent | (New Zealand) | 11 November 1978 (aged 32) | Right | Right arm medium pace |

== Trinidad and Tobago ==
Coach: (Trinidad and Tobago) Kelvin Williams

| No. | Player | Nat | Date of birth | Batting | Bowling style |
|---|---|---|---|---|---|
| 1 | Daren Ganga (c) | (Trinidad and Tobago) | 14 January 1979 (aged 32) | Right | Right arm off break |
| 7 | Samuel Badree | (Trinidad and Tobago) | 9 March 1981 (aged 30) | Right | Right arm leg break |
| 15 | Adrian Barath | (Trinidad and Tobago) | 14 April 1990 (aged 21) | Right | Right arm off break |
| 46 | Darren Bravo | (Trinidad and Tobago) | 6 February 1989 (aged 22) | Left | Left arm medium pace |
| 20 | Kevon Cooper | (Trinidad and Tobago) | 2 February 1989 (aged 22) | Right | Right arm medium pace |
| 51 | Rayad Emrit | (Trinidad and Tobago) | 8 March 1981 (aged 30) | Right | Right arm medium-fast |
| — | Shannon Gabriel | (Trinidad and Tobago) | 28 April 1988 (aged 23) | Right | Right arm fast-medium |
| 5 | Sherwin Ganga | (Trinidad and Tobago) | 13 February 1982 (aged 29) | Left | Right arm off break |
| 31 | Dave Mohammed | (Trinidad and Tobago) | 8 October 1979 (aged 31) | Left | Slow left-arm wrist-spin |
| 3 | Jason Mohammed | (Trinidad and Tobago) | 23 September 1986 (aged 25) | Right | Right arm off break |
| 24 | Sunil Narine | (Trinidad and Tobago) | 26 May 1988 (aged 23) | Left | Right arm off break |
| 40 | William Perkins | (Trinidad and Tobago) | 8 October 1986 (aged 24) | Right | — |
| 80 | Denesh Ramdin (wk) | (Trinidad and Tobago) | 13 March 1985 (aged 26) | Right | — |
| 14 | Ravi Rampaul | (Trinidad and Tobago) | 15 October 1984 (aged 26) | Left | Right arm fast-medium |
| 54 | Lendl Simmons | (Trinidad and Tobago) | 25 January 1985 (aged 26) | Right | Right arm medium-fast |

== Ruhuna ==
| No. | Player | Nat | Date of birth | Batting | Bowling style |
|---|---|---|---|---|---|
| 7 | Sanath Jayasuriya (c) | (Sri Lanka) | 30 June 1969 (aged 42) | Left | Slow left-arm orthodox |
| 21 | Amal Athulathmudali | (Sri Lanka) | 21 January 1987 (aged 24) | Left | Right arm fast-medium |
| 17 | Dinesh Chandimal (wk) | (Sri Lanka) | 18 November 1989 (aged 21) | Right | Right arm off break |
| 23 | Janaka Gunaratne | (Sri Lanka) | 14 March 1981 (aged 30) | Right | Right arm off break |
| 69 | Arosh Janoda | (Sri Lanka) | 11 September 1987 (aged 24) | Right | Right arm medium-fast |
| — | Shihan Kamileen | (Sri Lanka) | 30 September 1990 (aged 20) | Right | Right arm off break |
| 14 | Shalika Karunanayake | (Sri Lanka) | 14 February 1987 (aged 24) | Right | Right arm fast-medium |
| — | Yashodha Lanka | (Sri Lanka) | 1 October 1992 (aged 18) | Right | Left arm medium-fast |
| 9 | Chinthaka Perera | (Sri Lanka) | 14 February 1985 (aged 26) | Right | Right arm fast-medium |
| 8 | Kushal Janith Perera | (Sri Lanka) | 17 August 1990 (aged 21) | Left | — |
| — | Bhanuka Rajapaksa | (Sri Lanka) | 24 October 1991 (aged 19) | Left | Right arm medium pace |
| 5 | Tillakaratne Sampath | (Sri Lanka) | 23 June 1982 (aged 29) | Right | Right arm off break |
| — | Alankara Asanka Silva | (Sri Lanka) | 4 April 1985 (aged 26) | Right | Right arm off break |
| 34 | Milinda Siriwardana | (Sri Lanka) | 4 December 1985 (aged 25) | Left | Slow left-arm orthodox |
| 6 | Mahela Udawatte | (Sri Lanka) | 19 July 1986 (aged 25) | Left | Right arm off break |
| — | Omesh Wijesiriwardene | (Sri Lanka) | 10 March 1983 (aged 28) | Right | Right arm fast-medium |

== Somerset ==
Coach: (England) Andrew Hurry

| No. | Player | Nat | Date of birth | Batting | Bowling style |
|---|---|---|---|---|---|
| 8 | Alfonso Thomas (c) | (South Africa) | 9 February 1977 (aged 34) | Right | Right arm fast-medium |
| 18 | Alex Barrow | (England) | 6 May 1992 (aged 19) | Right | Right arm off break |
| 15 | Jos Buttler | (England) | 8 September 1990 (aged 21) | Right | — |
| 3 | Nick Compton | (England) | 26 June 1983 (aged 28) | Right | Right arm off break |
| 16 | Adam Dibble | (England) | 9 March 1991 (aged 20) | Right | Right arm medium-fast |
| 20 | George Dockrell | (Republic of Ireland) | 22 July 1992 (aged 19) | Right | Slow left-arm orthodox |
| 24 | Lewis Gregory | (England) | 24 May 1992 (aged 19) | Right | Right arm fast-medium |
| 25 | James Hildreth | (England) | 9 September 1984 (aged 27) | Right | Right arm medium-fast |
| 14 | Chris Jones | (England) | 5 November 1990 (aged 20) | Right | Right arm medium pace |
| 11 | Murali Kartik | (India) | 11 September 1976 (aged 35) | Left | Slow left-arm orthodox |
| 22 | Craig Kieswetter (wk) | (England) | 28 November 1987 (aged 23) | Right | — |
| 9 | Steve Kirby | (England) | 4 October 1977 (aged 33) | Right | Right arm fast-medium |
| 12 | Roelof van der Merwe | (South Africa) | 31 December 1984 (aged 26) | Right | Slow left-arm orthodox |
| 26 | Craig Meschede | (England) | 21 November 1991 (aged 19) | Right | Right arm medium-fast |
| 17 | Steve Snell | (England) | 27 February 1983 (aged 28) | Right | — |
| 23 | Arul Suppiah | (Malaysia) | 30 August 1983 (aged 28) | Right | Slow left-arm orthodox |
| 7 | Peter Trego | (England) | 12 June 1981 (aged 30) | Right | Right arm medium pace |

== Leicestershire Foxes ==
Coach: (England) Phil Whitticase

| No. | Player | Nat | Date of birth | Batting | Bowling style |
|---|---|---|---|---|---|
| 11 | Matthew Boyce | (England) | 13 August 1985 (aged 26) | Left | Right arm medium pace |
| 17 | Nathan Buck | (England) | 26 April 1991 (aged 20) | Right | Right arm fast-medium |
| 5 | Josh Cobb | (England) | 17 August 1990 (aged 21) | Right | Right arm leg spin |
| 6 | Harry Gurney | (England) | 25 October 1986 (aged 24) | Right | Left arm fast-medium |
| 15 | Claude Henderson | (South Africa) | 14 June 1972 (aged 39) | Right | Slow left-arm orthodox |
| 77 | Matthew Hoggard (c) | (England) | 31 December 1976 (aged 34) | Right | Right arm fast-medium |
| 1 | Will Jefferson | (England) | 25 October 1979 (aged 31) | Right | — |
| 4 | Andrew McDonald | (Australia) | 5 June 1981 (aged 30) | Right | Right arm medium pace |
| 22 | Jigar Naik | (England) | 10 August 1984 (aged 27) | Right | Right arm off spin |
| 3 | Paul Nixon (wk) | (England) | 21 October 1970 (aged 40) | Left | Left arm medium pace |
| 12 | Abdul Razzaq | (Pakistan) | 2 December 1979 (aged 31) | Right | Right arm fast-medium |
| 14 | Greg Smith | (England) | 16 November 1988 (aged 22) | Right | Slow left-arm orthodox |
| 9 | James Taylor | (England) | 6 January 1990 (aged 21) | Right | Right arm leg spin |
| 8 | Jacques Du Toit | (South Africa) | 2 January 1980 (aged 31) | Right | Right arm fast-medium |
| 35 | Wayne White | (England) | 22 September 1985 (aged 26) | Right | Right arm fast-medium |
