= List of New South Wales Twenty20 cricketers =

A total of 47 players represented New South Wales in Twenty20 cricket matches between the team's first and final matches, in January 2006 and October 2011. Following the introduction of the Big Bash League, New South Wales is effectively defunct in Twenty20 competitions, instead being replaced by two franchises—the Sydney Sixers and the Sydney Thunder.

== List of players ==
No.	Name	First	Last	M	Runs	HS	Avg	SR	100	50	W	BB	Ave	Econ	4/i	C	St	Ref
1	Phil Jaques	8 Jan. 2006	5 Feb. 2011	14	322	69	26.83		0	2	–	–	–	–	–	1	0	
2	Jarrad Burke	8 Jan. 2006	21 Jan. 2006	3	48	30	16.00	114.28	0	0	1	1/26	26.00	8.66	0	1	0	
3	Daniel Smith	8 Jan. 2006	7 Oct. 2011	37	478	62	17.07		0	1	–	–	–	–	–	13	6	
4	Dominic Thornely	8 Jan. 2006	5 Feb. 2011	24	404	57*	22.44		0	1	10	2/21	31.45	7/68	0	7	0	
5	Daniel Christian	8 Jan. 2006	10 Jan. 2007	7	68	24	11.33		0	0	6	3/38	18.16	9.08	0	2	0	
6	Aaron O'Brien	8 Jan. 2006	6 Jan. 2008	10	105	38	15.00		0	0	11	2/7	21.50	7.92	0	2	0	
7	Ian Moran	8 Jan. 2006	21 Jan. 2006	3	12	12*	12.00		0	0	3	3/21	17.33	10.40	0	1	0	
8	Moises Henriques	8 Jan. 2006	7 Oct. 2011	38	544	51*	19.42		0	1	31	3/11	28.87	8.39	0	22	0	
9	Matthew Nicholson	8 Jan. 2006	6 Jan. 2008	6	34	20*	34.00		0	0	6	2/18	23.14	8.50	0	1	0	
10	Aaron Bird	8 Jan. 2006	5 Jan. 2010	12	29	17*	9.66	82.85	0	0	21	3/21	17.42	9.22	0	5	0	
11	Doug Bollinger	8 Jan. 2006	9 Jan. 2011	16	–	–	–	–	–	–	14	3/22	30.00	7.47	0	5	0	
12	Stephen Phillips	10 Jan. 2006	21 Jan. 2006	2	53	33	26.50	139.47	0	0	–	–	–	–	–	1	0	
13	Craig Simmons	21 Jan. 2006	21 Jan. 2006	1	39	39	39.00	185.71	0	0	–	–	–	–	–	0	0	
14	Ed Cowan	1 Jan. 2007	10 Jan. 2007	4	53	25	13.25		0	0	–	–	–	–	–	1	0	
15	Brad Haddin	1 Jan. 2007	9 Jan. 2011	9	162	54	18.00		0	1	–	–	–	–	–	6	6	
16	Simon Katich	1 Jan. 2007	7 Oct. 2011	23	436	53	27.25		0	1	–	–	–	–	–	15	0	
17	Nathan Hauritz	1 Jan. 2007	24 Sep. 2011	16	58	23*	29.00		0	0	17	3/21	19.76	6.54	0	5	0	
18	Nathan Bracken	1 Jan. 2007	6 Jan. 2009	8	7	7*	7.00		0	0	11	3/38	21.00	8.16	0	0	0	
19	Scott Coyte	1 Jan. 2007	5 Feb. 2011	12	70	28*	17.50		0	0	6	2/35	61.00	9.63	0	4	0	
20	Tim Lang	1 Jan. 2007	10 Jan. 2007	4	10	8	3.33	50.00	0	0	6	2/26	18.14	7.91	0	0	0	
21	David Warner	5 Jan. 2007	7 Oct. 2011	34	1232	135*	42.48		2	7	0	0/13	–	13.00	0	13	0	
22	Andrew Johns	7 Jan. 2007	10 Jan. 2007	2	9	9	9.00	81.81	0	0	0	0/9	–	9.00	0	0	0	
23	Steve Smith	1 Jan. 2008	7 Oct. 2011	25	329	45*	21.93		0	0	22	4/13	15.86	7.27	2	8	0	
24	Mark Cameron	1 Jan. 2008	24 Jan. 2009	6	15	14*	–	107.14	0	0	5	2/45	38.00	7.91	0	2	0	
25	Glenn McGrath	8 Jan. 2008	24 Jan. 2009	1	0	0	0.00	0.00	0	0	1	1/11	11.00	2.75	0	2	0	
26	Beau Casson	8 Jan. 2008	30 Dec. 2008	4	–	–	–	–	–	–	1	1/20	99.00	9.00	0	1	0	
27	Phillip Hughes	26 Dec. 2008	24 Jan. 2011	17	527	83	37.64		0	4	–	–	–	–	–	10	0	
28	Ben Rohrer	26 Dec. 2008	7 Oct. 2011	27	362	47*	24.13		0	0	–	–	–	–	–	6	0	
29	Peter Forrest	6 Jan. 2009	12 Jan. 2009	2	21	13*	21.00		0	0	–	–	–	–	–	2	0	
30	Stephen O'Keefe	12 Jan. 2009	7 Oct. 2011	13	73	50	12.16		0	1	12	3/23	23.58	7.25	0	4	0	
31	Simon Keen	17 Jan. 2009	17 Jan. 2009	1	4	4	4.00		0	0	–	–	–	–	–	0	0	
32	Brendon McCullum	24 Jan. 2009	24 Jan. 2009	1	10	10	10.00		0	0	–	–	–	–	–	0	0	
33	Brett Lee	9 Oct. 2009	4 Jan. 2011	7	48	48	24.00		0	0	8	2/10	12.37	4.12	0	3	0	
34	Stuart Clark	9 Oct. 2009	7 Oct. 2011	17	4	4*	–		0	0	22	3/12	15.78	5.77	0	2	0	
35	Dwayne Smith	30 Dec. 2009	17 Jan. 2010	5	31	25	7.75		0	0	6	2/4	17.50	7.68	0	3	0	
36	Mitchell Starc	30 Dec. 2009	7 Oct. 2011	10	3	3	2.00		0	0	8	2/21	33.50	8.50	0	1	0	
37	Josh Hazlewood	30 Dec. 2009	5 Jan. 2010	3	6	6*	–		0	0	1	1/35	85.00	8.76	0	0	0	
38	Usman Khawaja	2 Jan. 2010	1 Feb. 2011	7	119	65	19.83		0	1	–	–	–	–	–	1	0	
39	Grant Lambert	13 Jan. 2010	17 Jan. 2010	2	–	–	–	–	–	–	4	3/20	12.75	7.50	0	0	0	
40	Peter Nevill	17 Jan. 2010	19 Jan. 2011	3	13	13	6.50		0	0	–	–	–	–	–	3	1	
41	Nic Maddinson	4 Jan. 2011	9 Jan. 2011	2	1	1	1.00		0	0	–	–	–	–	–	0	0	
42	Trent Copeland	19 Jan. 2011	19 Jan. 2011	1	–	–	–	–	–	–	0	0/26	–	13.00	0	0	0	
43	Pat Cummins	19 Jan. 2011	7 Oct. 2011	11	10	7*	5.00		0	0	18	4/16	15.31	6.84	2	1	0	
44	Tim Armstrong	22 Jan. 2011	22 Jan. 2011	1	11	11*	–	183.33	0	0	–	–	–	–	–	0	0	
45	Sean Abbott	22 Jan. 2011	5 Feb. 2011	5	20	10*	10.00		0	0	5	3/15	14.00	7.77	0	2	0	
46	Luke Doran	5 Feb. 2011	5 Feb. 2011	1	0	0*	–		0	0	0	0/31	–	7.68	0	0	0	
47	Shane Watson	24 Sep. 2011	7 Oct. 2011	5	75	34	15.00		0	0	–	–	–	–	–	1	0	

== List of captains ==
No.	Name	Nat	First	Last	Mat	Won	Tied	Lost	No result	Win%	Ref
1	Matthew Nicholson	(Australia)	8 January 2006	10 January 2006	3	2	0	1	0	66.67%	
2	Simon Katich	(Australia)	1 January 2007	7 October 2011	23	12	1	9	0	52.17%	
3	Dominic Thornely	(Australia)	26 December 2008	6 January 2009	3	2	0	1	0	66.67%	
4	Moises Henriques	(Australia)	30 December 2009	22 January 2011	6	3	0	3	0	50.00%	
5	Stuart Clark	(Australia)	4 January 2011	5 February 2011	7	3	0	4	0	42.86%	
