= 2010–11 Twenty20 Big Bash =

Twenty20 Big Bash 2010–11
- Administrator: Cricket Australia
- Cricket format: Twenty20
- Tournament format(s): Group stage and knockout
- Champions: Southern Redbacks (1st title)
- Participants: 6
- Matches: 20
- Most runs: Daniel Harris (SA) (304)
- Most wickets: Patrick Cummins (NSW) (11); Nathan Lyon (SA) (11)

The 2010–11 KFC Twenty20 Big Bash was the sixth season of the KFC Twenty20 Big Bash, the official Twenty20 domestic cricket competition in Australia. Six teams representing six states in Australia participated in the competition. The competition began on 30 December 2010. It was won by South Australia, who defeated New South Wales in the final.

This season used a new format comprising 18 regular matches, a preliminary final and a final. This format had 3 additional regular matches to the 2009–10 season.

== Table ==
Teams received 2 points for a win, 1 for a tie or no result, and 0 for a loss. At the end of the regular matches the teams ranked two and three play each other in the preliminary final at the home venue of the team ranked two. The winner of the preliminary final earns the right to play the first placed team in the final at the home venue of the first placed team. In the event of several teams finishing with the same number of points, standings are determined by most wins, then net run rate (NRR).

The two teams that make the final will qualify for the 2011 Champions League Twenty20 tournament.

Pos	Team	Pld	W	L	T	NR	Pts	NRR
1	Southern Redbacks	6	5	1	0	0	10	1.438
2	Tasmanian Tigers	6	4	2	0	0	8	0.181
3	New South Wales Blues	6	3	3	0	0	6	−0.160
4	Western Warriors	6	3	3	0	0	6	−0.662
5	Queensland Bulls	6	2	4	0	0	4	0.077
6	Victoria Bushrangers	6	1	5	0	0	2	−0.887

== Teams ==
Club	Home Ground	Captain	International Player(s)
New South Wales Blues	Stadium Australia, Sydney	David Warner	Stuart Clark, Moises Henriques, Pat Cummins
Queensland Bulls	Brisbane Cricket Ground	James Hopes	Michael Lumb
Southern Redbacks	Adelaide Oval	Michael Klinger	Kieron Pollard, Adil Rashid
Tasmanian Tigers	Bellerive Oval, Hobart	George Bailey	Ryan ten Doeschate, Rana Naved-ul-Hasan
Victorian Bushrangers	Melbourne Cricket Ground	Cameron White	Dwayne Bravo, Matt Prior
Western Warriors	WACA Ground, Perth	Marcus North	Chris Gayle, Sajid Mahmood

- *Signed on full contract i.e. able to play other forms of cricket for the state

== Fixtures ==
Scores are listed in the Australian format of wickets/runs.

=== Round 1 ===
30 December 2010
17:30
Scorecard

Tasmania; 6/189 (20 overs)	v	Western Australia (H); 126 (19 overs)
Tim Paine 71 (57); Mick Lewis 3/46 (4 overs)		Adam Voges 38 (24); Naved-ul-Hasan 3/19 (4 overs)

Tasmania won by 63 runs
WACA Ground, Perth
Attendance: 15,000
Umpires: Simon Fry and Mick Martell
Player of the match: Tim Paine (Tas)

- Tasmania won the toss and elected to bat.

2 January 2011
19:00
Scorecard

(H) Victoria; 4/188 (20 overs)	v	Queensland; 9/155 (20 overs)
Aaron Finch 58 (38); Ben Cutting 1/26 (3 overs)		James Hopes 36 (26); Clint McKay 3/26 (4 overs)

Victoria won by 33 runs
Melbourne Cricket Ground, Melbourne
Attendance: 29,429
Umpires: Gerald Abood and Bob Parry
Player of the match: Aaron Finch (Vic)

- Victoria won the toss and elected to bat.

4 January 2011
19:00
Scorecard

New South Wales; 5/168 (20 overs)	v	South Australia (H); 147 (17.2 overs)
David Warner 73* (58); Nathan Lyon 2/30 (4 overs)		Kieron Pollard 53 (24); Nathan Hauritz 3/21 (3.2 overs)

New South Wales won by 21 runs
Adelaide Oval, Adelaide
Attendance: 17,720
Umpires: Paul Reiffel and Paul Wilson
Player of the match: Steve O'Keefe (NSW)

- New South Wales won the toss and elected to bat.

=== Round 2 ===
7 January 2011
19:00
Scorecard

Tasmania; 9/118 (20 overs)	v	Queensland (H); 2/119 (13.5 overs)
George Bailey 37 (30); Nathan Rimmington 2/23 (4 overs)		James Hopes 65* (44); Xavier Doherty 1/19 (3 overs)

Queensland won by 8 wickets
Brisbane Cricket Ground, Brisbane
Attendance: 6,201
Umpires: Gerard Abood and John Ward
Player of the match: James Hopes (Qld)

- Queensland won the toss and elected to field.

8 January 2011
19:00
Scorecard

(H) South Australia; 3/171 (20 overs)	v	Victoria; 116 (17 overs)
Michael Klinger 76* (53); Shane Harwood 1/27 (3 overs)		Cameron White 43 (31); Daniel Christian 4/31 (4 overs)

South Australia won by 55 runs
Adelaide Oval, Adelaide
Attendance: 14,576
Umpires: Mick Martell and Paul Reiffel
Player of the match: Michael Klinger (SA)

- South Australia won the toss and elected to bat.

9 January 2011
19:00
Scorecard

Western Australia; 5/205 (20 overs)	v	New South Wales (H); 4/104 (11.5 overs)
Shaun Marsh 85 (45); Stuart Clark 2/27 (4 overs)		David Warner 50 (34); Matt Johnston 2/23 (3 overs)

Western Australia won by 19 runs (D/L)
Stadium Australia, Sydney
Attendance: 15,021
Umpires: Ian Lock and Bob Parry
Player of the match: Shaun Marsh (WA)

- Western Australia won the toss and elected to bat.
- Rain reduced NSW's target to 124 runs from 11.5 overs according to the Duckworth–Lewis method.

=== Round 3 ===
11 January 2011
19:00
Scorecard

Victoria; 8/107 (15 overs)	v	Tasmania (H); 1/108 (11.3 overs)
Matt Prior 51 (29); Jason Krezja 3/13 (2 overs)		Jonathan Wells 51* (33); John Hastings 1/19 (2 overs)

Tasmania won by 9 wickets
Bellerive Oval, Hobart
Attendance:
Umpires: Geoff Joshua and Tony Ward
Player of the match: Jonathan Wells (Tas)

- Tasmania won the toss and elected to field.
- Rain before the start of play restricted both teams to 15 overs.

13 January 2011
17:30
Scorecard

South Australia; 8/202 (20 overs)	v	Western Australia (H); 9/156 (20 overs)
Daniel Harris 70 (37); Brett Dorey 3/33 (4 overs)		Marcus North 48 (29); Daniel Harris 2/14 (1.4 overs)

South Australia won by 46 runs
Western Australia Cricket Association Ground, Perth
Attendance: 11,772
Umpires: Gerald Abood and Ashley Barrow
Player of the match: Daniel Harris (SA)

- South Australia won the toss and elected to bat.

=== Round 4 ===
18 January 2011
17:30
Scorecard

Victoria; 8/145 (20 overs)	v	Western Australia (H); 4/146 (17.1 overs)
Aaron Finch 61 (46); Michael Hogan 4/26 (4 overs)		Shaun Marsh 93* (59); Dwayne Bravo 1/11 (2 overs)

Western Australia won by 6 wickets
WACA Ground, Perth
Attendance: 11,260
Umpires: Ian Lock and John Ward
Player of the match: Shaun Marsh (WA)

- Victoria won the toss and elected to bat.

19 January 2011
19:00
Scorecard

Tasmania; 6/152 (20 overs)	v	New South Wales (H); 5/150 (20 overs)
Travis Birt 47 (36); Patrick Cummins 3/29 (4 overs)		Ben Rohrer 47 (29); Naved-ul-Hasan 2/31 (4 overs)

Tasmania won by 2 runs
Stadium Australia, Sydney
Attendance: 16,609
Umpires: Ashley Barrow and Geoff Joshua
Player of the match: Naved-ul-Hasan (Tas)

- Tasmania won the toss and elected to bat.

20 January 2011
19:00
Scorecard

(H) South Australia; 6/159 (20 overs)	v	Queensland; 9/149 (20 overs)
Daniel Harris 45 (36); Chris Simpson 3/17 (4 overs)		Michael Lumb 24 (13); Adil Rashid 2/26 (4 overs)

South Australia won by 10 runs
Adelaide Oval, Adelaide
Attendance:
Umpires: Steve Davis and Paul Wilson
Player of the match: Daniel Christian (SA)

- South Australia won the toss and elected to bat.

=== Round 5 ===
22 January 2011
19:00
Scorecard

New South Wales; 7/168 (20 overs)	v	Victoria (H); 7/151(20 overs)
Usman Khawaja 65 (43); James Pattinson 3/22 (4 overs)		Aaron Finch 53 (37); Sean Abbott 2/25 (4 overs)

New South Wales won by 17 runs
Melbourne Cricket Ground, Melbourne
Attendance: 17,118
Umpires: Geoff Joshua and Tony Ward
Player of the match: Steve O'Keefe (NSW)

- New South Wales won the toss and elected to bat.

24 January 2011
17:30
Scorecard

(H) Tasmania; 110 (19.1 overs)	v	South Australia; 1/112 (11.3 overs)
Ryan ten Doeschate 22 (30); Nathan Lyon 3/14 (4 overs)		Daniel Harris 66* (40); Ben Hilfenhaus 1/16 (2 overs)

South Australia won by 9 wickets
Bellerive Oval, Hobart
Attendance:
Umpires: Mick Martell and John Ward
Player of the match: Nathan Lyon (SA)

- Tasmania won the toss and elected to bat.

24 January 2011
19:30
Scorecard

New South Wales; 7/140 (20 overs)	v	Queensland (H); 9/123 (20 overs)
Ben Rohrer 47* (25); Michael Neser 3/33 (4 overs)		Nathan Rimmington 24* (11); Sean Abbott 3/15 (3 overs)

New South Wales win by 17 runs
Brisbane Cricket Ground, Brisbane
Attendance:
Umpires: Bob Parry and Paul Wilson
Player of the match: Ben Rohrer (NSW)

- New South Wales won the toss and elected to bat.
- Match postponed from 15 January due to Queensland floods.

25 January 2011
19:00
Scorecard

Western Australia; 4/202 (20 overs)	v	Queensland (H); 5/170 (20 overs)
Chris Gayle 92 (40); Michael Neser 1/28 (2 overs)		Nathan Reardon 56 (45); Mick Lewis 2/39 (4 overs)

Western Australia won by 32 runs
Brisbane Cricket Ground, Brisbane
Attendance: 11,601
Umpires: Geoff Joshua and Ian Lock
Player of the match: Chris Gayle (WA)

- Western Australia won the toss and elected to bat.

=== Round 6 ===
27 January 2011
19:00
Scorecard

(H) Tasmania; 7/170 (20 overs)	v	Western Australia; 8/130 (20 overs)
George Bailey 51 (30); Michael Swart 3/31 (4 overs)		Luke Ronchi 43 (29); Jason Krejza 2/17 (4 overs)

Tasmania won by 40 runs
Bellerive Oval, Hobart
Attendance:
Umpires: Ashley Barrow and Tony Ward
Player of the match: George Bailey (Tas)

- Tasmania won the toss and elected to bat.

28 January 2011
19:00
Scorecard

(H) Victoria; 4/144 (20 overs)	v	South Australia; 5/147 (19.2 overs)
Matthew Wade 52* (31); Daniel Christian 2/41 (4 overs)		Daniel Harris 41 (35); Jon Holland 2/23 (4 overs)

South Australia won by 5 wickets
Melbourne Cricket Ground, Melbourne
Attendance: 13,329
Umpires: Bob Parry and Paul Wilson
Player of the match: Matthew Wade (Vic)

- Victoria won the toss and elected to bat.

29 January 2011
19:00
Scorecard

(H) New South Wales; 120 (19.3 overs)	v	Queensland; 2/124 (13.5 overs)
Dominic Thornely 34 (29); Ben Laughlin 3/25 (4 overs)		James Hopes 62* (38); Moises Henriques 1/23 (2.5 overs)

Queensland won by 8 wickets
Stadium Australia, Sydney
Attendance: 19,849
Umpires: Simon Fry and Mick Martell
Player of the match: James Hopes (Qld)

- New South Wales won the toss and elected to bat.

== Knockout stage ==
=== Preliminary final ===
1 February 2011
19:00
Scorecard

(H) Tasmania; 103 (17 overs)	v	New South Wales; 1/107 (12.5 overs)
Travis Birt 22 (21); Patrick Cummins 4/16 (4 overs)		David Warner 70* (49); Jason Krezja 1/31 (2.5 overs)

New South Wales won by 9 wickets
Bellerive Oval, Hobart
Attendance: 5,058
Umpires: Paul Reiffel and John Ward
Player of the match: Patrick Cummins (NSW)

- Tasmania won the toss and elected to bat.
- Rain before the start of play restricted both teams to 17 overs.

=== Final ===
5 February 2011
19:00
Scorecard

New South Wales; 8/153 (20 overs)	v	South Australia (H); 2/155 (17.3 overs)
Daniel Smith 43 (35); Kane Richardson 3/31 (4 overs)		Cameron Borgas 62* (39); Dominic Thornely 1/5 (1 over)

South Australia won by 8 wickets
Adelaide Oval, Adelaide
Attendance: 27,290
Umpires: Ian Lock and John Ward
Player of the match: Cameron Borgas (SA)

- New South Wales won the toss and elected to bat.

== Statistics ==
=== Highest team totals ===
The following table lists the six highest team scores during this season.

Team	Total	Opponent	Ground
Western Australia	5/205	New South Wales	Stadium Australia, Sydney
Western Australia	4/202	Queensland	Brisbane Cricket Ground, Brisbane
South Australia	8/202	Western Australia	Western Australia Cricket Association Ground, Perth
Tasmania	6/189	Western Australia	Western Australia Cricket Association Ground, Perth
Victoria	4/188	Queensland	Melbourne Cricket Ground, Melbourne
South Australia	3/171	Victoria	Adelaide Oval, Adelaide

Last Updated 25 January 2011.

=== Most runs ===
The top five highest run scorers (total runs) in the season are included in this table.

Player	Team	Runs	Inns	Avg	S/R	HS	100s	50s	4s	6s
Daniel Harris	South Australia	304	6	60.80	138.81	70	0	2	28	12
David Warner	New South Wales	298	8	49.66	127.89	73*	0	3	29	10
Aaron Finch	Victoria	222	5	44.40	132.93	61	0	3	21	7
Shaun Marsh	Western Australia	202	4	67.33	156.58	93*	0	2	15	10
George Bailey	Tasmania	185	7	30.83	143.41	51	0	1	16	5

Last Updated 1 February 2011.

=== Highest scores ===
This table contains the top five highest scores of the season made by a batsman in a single innings.

Player	Team	Score	Balls	4s	6s	Opponent	Ground
Shaun Marsh	Western Australia	93*	59	9	3	Victoria	Western Australia Cricket Association Ground, Perth
Chris Gayle	Western Australia	92	40	7	8	Queensland	Brisbane Cricket Ground, Brisbane
Shaun Marsh	Western Australia	85	45	4	6	New South Wales	Stadium Australia, Sydney
Michael Klinger	South Australia	76*	53	4	2	Victoria	Adelaide Oval, Adelaide
David Warner	New South Wales	73*	58	7	1	South Australia	Adelaide Oval, Adelaide

Last Updated 25 January 2011.

=== Most wickets ===
The following table contains the five leading wicket-takers of the season.

Player	Team	Wkts	Mts	Ave	S/R	Econ	BBI
Patrick Cummins	New South Wales	11	6	14.09	12.8	6.59	4/16
Nathan Lyon	South Australia	11	7	17.72	14.1	7.50	3/14
Adil Rashid	South Australia	10	7	14.00	12.6	6.66	3/15
Jason Krejza	Tasmania	9	7	15.44	14.5	6.36	3/13
Stuart Clark	New South Wales	9	7	17.22	17.3	5.96	3/28

=== Best bowling figures ===
This table lists the top five players with the best bowling figures in the season.

Player	Team	Overs	Figures	Opponent	Ground
Patrick Cummins	New South Wales	4.0	4/16	Tasmania	Bellerive Oval, Hobart
Michael Hogan	Western Australia	4.0	4/26	Victoria	Western Australia Cricket Association Ground, Perth
Daniel Christian	South Australia	4.0	4/31	Victoria	Adelaide Oval, Adelaide
Jason Krejza	Tasmania	2.0	3/13	Victoria	Bellerive Oval, Hobart
Nathan Lyon	South Australia	4.0	3/14	Tasmania	Bellerive Oval, Hobart

== Media coverage ==
Television

- Fox Sports (live) – Australia
- Star Cricket (live) – India, Sri Lanka, Pakistan
- SKY Sport (live) – New Zealand
- Supersport (live) – South Africa
