= 2008–09 Twenty20 Big Bash =

Twenty20 Big Bash 2008–09
- Administrator: Cricket Australia
- Cricket format: Twenty20
- Tournament format: Single round-robin then knockout
- Champions: New South Wales Blues (1st title)
- Participants: 6
- Matches: 17
- Attendance: 176,644 (10,391 per match)
- Player of the series: Lee Carseldine (Qld)
- Most runs: Lee Carseldine (Qld) 298 (221 balls)
- Most wickets: Aaron Bird (NSW) 13 (183 runs, 23 overs)

The 2008–09 KFC Twenty20 Big Bash was the 4th season of the official Twenty20 domestic cricket competition in Australia. Six teams representing six states in Australia participated in the competition. The competition began on 26 December 2008 when the Queensland Bulls took on the New South Wales Blues at the Brisbane Cricket Ground (Gabba).

This season comprised 15 regular matches, a preliminary final and a final, the same as was in the 2007–08 season except with the addition of the preliminary final.

== Table ==
Teams received 2 points for a win, 1 for a tie or no result, and 0 for a loss. The teams ranked two and three played each other at the home venue of the team ranked two, for the right to play the first placed team in a final at the venue of the first placed team. In the event of several teams finishing with the same number of points, standings were determined by most wins, then most wins among the teams concerned, then net run rate (NRR).

The two teams that made the final have qualified for the 2009 Champions League Twenty20.

Pos	Team	Pld	W	L	T	NR	Pts
1	New South Wales Blues	5	3	2	0	0	6
2	Queensland Bulls	5	3	2	0	0	6
3	Victorian Bushrangers	5	3	2	0	0	6
4	Southern Redbacks	5	2	3	0	0	4
5	Western Warriors	5	2	3	0	0	4
6	Tasmanian Tigers	5	2	3	0	0	4

== Teams ==
Club	Home ground	Captain
New South Wales Blues	ANZ Stadium, Sydney	David Warner
Queensland Bulls	Brisbane Cricket Ground	James Hopes
Southern Redbacks	Adelaide Oval	Michael Klinger
Tasmanian Tigers	Bellerive Oval, Hobart	George Bailey
Victorian Bushrangers	Melbourne Cricket Ground	Cameron White
Western Warriors	WACA Ground, Perth	Marcus North

== Fixtures ==
26 December 2008
18:45
(scorecard)

(H) Queensland; 7/161 (20 overs)	v	New South Wales; 5/162 (19.4 overs)
Chris Simpson 39 (25); Nathan Reardon 27 (15); Doug Bollinger 3/22 (4 overs); Moises Henriques 2/26 (4 overs)		Phil Hughes 80* (60); Ben Rohrer 24 (17); Nathan Rimmington 2/28 (3.4 overs); Ryan Harris 1/33 (4 overs)

New South Wales won by 5 wickets with 2 balls remaining
Brisbane Cricket Ground, Brisbane
Attendance: 10,514
Umpires: NS McNamara & RL Parry
Player of the match: Phil Hughes (NSW)

- Broadcast by Fox Sports

28 December 2008
16:00
(scorecard)

Victoria; 5/203 (20 overs)	v	Tasmania (H); 168 (18.3 overs)
David Hussey 100 (47); Cameron White 24 (16); Gerard Denton 2/37 (4 overs); Jason Krejza 1/23 (4 overs)		Travis Birt 58 (34); Rhett Lockyear 26 (15); Andrew McDonald 3/32 (4 overs); Damien Wright 3/34 (3.3 overs)

Victoria won by 35 runs
Bellerive Oval, Hobart Att: 3709
Umpires: SG John & PR Reiffel
Player of the match: David Hussey (Vic)

28 December 2008
18:45
(scorecard)

(H) South Australia; 182 (19.2 overs)	v	Western Australia; 6/121 (17.0 overs)
Callum Ferguson 58 (38); Daniel Harris 35 (20); Umar Gul 4/15 (3.2 overs); Brett Dorey 2/33 (4 overs)		Adam Voges 28 (18); Luke Pomersbach 24 (16); Gary Putland 2/17 (3 overs); Mark Cleary 2/26 (4 overs)

South Australia won by 35 runs D/L method
Adelaide Oval, Adelaide Att: 9254
Umpires: AR Collins and IH Lock
Player of the match: Callum Ferguson (SA)

- Rain stopped play after 5.1 overs of the WA innings with the score 1/37. 3 overs were lost. Revised target 157 runs from 17 overs.

30 December 2008
19:15
(scorecard)

(H) New South Wales; 5/148 (20 overs)	v	Western Australia; 5/149 (19.1 overs)
Phil Hughes 35 (34); Steven Smith 34* (21); Adam Voges 1/13 (2 overs); Marcus North 1/27 (4 overs)		Marcus North 45* (37); Adam Voges 39 (31); Nathan Bracken 2/24 (4 overs); Dominic Thornely 1/19 (3 overs)

Western Australia won by 5 wickets with 5 balls remaining
ANZ Stadium, Sydney Att: 12290
Umpires: GA Abood and RJ Tucker
Player of the match: Marcus North (WA)

1 January 2009
16:00
(scorecard)

(H) Tasmania; 8/184 (20 overs)	v	Queensland; 4/166 (20 overs)
Rhett Lockyear 52 (28); George Bailey 52 (34); Ryan Harris 3/26 (4 overs); Chris Simpson 3/28 (4 overs)		James Hopes 58 (38); Glen Batticciotto 38 (34); Gerard Denton 1/24 (4 overs); Xavier Doherty & Jason Krejza 1/29 (4 overs)

Tasmania won by 18 runs
Bellerive Oval, Hobart Att: 3177
Umpires: BJ Muir and AP Ward
Player of the match: Rhett Lockyear (Tas)

2 January 2009
18:45
(scorecard)

South Australia; 5/183 (20 overs)	v	Victoria (H); 2/184 (19.5 overs)
Daniel Harris 98 (62); Tom Cooper 50 (36); Shane Harwood 3/27 (4 overs); Clint McKay 1/41 (4 overs)		Brad Hodge 75* (61); Cameron White 51 (33); Daniel Christian 1/24 (2 overs); Sohail Tanvir 1/30 (4 overs)

Victoria won by 8 wickets with 1 ball remaining
Melbourne Cricket Ground, Melbourne Att: 10484
Umpires: GC Joshua and JD Ward
Player of the match: Daniel Harris (SA)

4 January 2009
16:00
(scorecard)

(H) Victoria; 7/161 (20 overs)	v	Queensland; 4/165 (19.4 overs)
Brad Hodge 42 (37); David Hussey 29* (28); James Hopes 2/38 (4 overs); Nathan Rimmington 1/24 (4 overs)		Lee Carseldine 67* (44); James Hopes 39 (28); Dirk Nannes 2/19 (4 overs); Damien Wright 1/32 (4 overs)

Queensland won by 6 wickets with 2 balls remaining
Skilled Stadium, Geelong Att: 12327
Umpires: AP Ward and JD Ward
Player of the match: Lee Carseldine (Qld)

4 January 2009
18:15
(scorecard)

Tasmania; 128 (20 overs)	v	Western Australia (H); 7/132 (19.5 overs)
Rhett Lockyear 49 (34); George Bailey 39 (38); Umar Gul 3/21 (4 overs); Brett Dorey 3/22 (4 overs)		Craig Simmons 31* (20); Luke Ronchi 17 (17); Jason Krejza 1/21 (4 overs); Ben Hilfenhaus 1/22 (4 overs)

Western Australia won by 3 wickets with 1 ball remaining
WACA Ground, Perth Att: 10534
Umpires: JK Brookes and MD Martell
Player of the match: Craig Simmons (WA)

6 January 2009
18:45
(scorecard)

(H) South Australia; 8/160 (20 overs)	v	New South Wales; 6/161 (18.2 overs)
Tom Cooper 46 (41); Daniel Christian 31 (26); Shaun Tait 3/30 (4 overs); Dan Cullen 1/14 (2.2 overs)		David Warner 65 (35); Phillip Hughes 30 (29); Aaron Bird 3/35 (4 overs); Nathan Bracken 3/38 (4 overs)

New South Wales won by 4 wickets with 10 balls remaining
Adelaide Oval, Adelaide Att: 13378
Umpires: AR Collins and DJ Harper
Player of the match: David Warner (NSW)

8 January 2009
18:45
(scorecard)

(H) Victoria; 7/183 (20 overs)	v	Western Australia; 105 (17 overs)
Brad Hodge 73 (54); David Hussey 37 (22); Ben Edmondson 4/25 (4 overs); Umar Gul 2/32 (4 overs)		Shaun Marsh 25 (22); Adam Voges 21 (19); Cameron White 4/10 (2 overs); David Hussey 2/24 (4 overs)

Victoria won by 78 runs
Melbourne Cricket Ground, Melbourne Att: 11159
Umpires: GC Joshua and PR Reiffel
Player of the match: Brad Hodge (Vic)

9 January 2009
18:45
(scorecard)

South Australia; 7/163 (20 overs)	v	Queensland (H); 3/164 (18 overs)
Michael Klinger 42 (32); Daniel Harris 40 (28); Chris Simpson 2/30 (4 overs); Ben Laughlin 1/24 (4 overs)		Lee Carseldine 67 (47); Nathan Reardon 46 (23); Daniel Christian 1/28 (3 overs); Mark Cleary 1/35 (4 overs)

Queensland won by 7 wickets with 12 balls remaining
Brisbane Cricket Ground, Brisbane Att: 12356
Umpires: JK Brookes and BNJ Oxenford
Player of the match: Lee Carseldine (Qld)

12 January 2009
19:15
(scorecard)

Tasmania; 7/194 (20 overs)	v	New South Wales (H); 8/166 (20 overs)
Rhett Lockyear 51 (29); Travis Birt 44 (17); Doug Bollinger 2/32 (4 overs); Aaron Bird 2/40 (4 overs)		Moises Henriques 42 (25); Ben Rohrer 30 (23); Jason Krejza 3/23 (4 overs); Xavier Doherty 2/26 (4 overs)

Tasmania won by 28 runs
ANZ Stadium, Sydney Att: 10216
Umpires: GA Abood and RL Parry
Player of the match: Jason Krejza (Tas)

- Rain stopped play after 17 overs of the NSW innings with the score 8/136. No overs were lost.

15 January 2009
16:00
(scorecard)

South Australia; 8/176 (20 overs)	v	Tasmania (H); 124 (19.3 overs)
Daniel Christian 54 (34); Callum Ferguson 44 (33); Chris Duval 2/27 (4 overs); Jason Krejza 1/23 (4 overs)		Jason Krejza 31 (22); Michael Dighton 28 (18); Daniel Christian 4/23 (4 overs); Dan Cullen 2/22 (3.3 overs)

South Australia won by 52 runs
North Tasmania Cricket Association Ground, Launceston Att: 6743
Umpires: SG John and IH Lock
Player of the match: Daniel Christian (SA)

15 January 2009
18:15
(scorecard)

Queensland; 3/189 (20 overs)	v	Western Australia (H); 127 (17.5 overs)
Lee Carseldine 74 (45); Nathan Reardon 51 (32); Umar Gul 2/38 (4 overs); Marcus North 1/24 (4 overs)		Craig Simmons 26 (10); Justin Coetzee 23* (15); Nathan Rimmington 3/14 (3 overs); Chris Simpson 3/27 (4 overs)

Queensland won by 62 runs
WACA Ground, Perth Att: 12562
Umpires: MD Martell and P Wilson
Player of the match: Lee Carseldine (Qld)

17 January 2009
19:15
scorecard

(H) New South Wales; 8/128 (20 overs)	v	Victoria; 9/126 (20 overs)
Dominic Thornely 36* (36); Simon Katich 35 (26); Dirk Nannes 4/11 (4 overs); Jon Holland 1/21 (4 overs)		Aaron Finch 43 (46); Adam Crosthwaite 20 (14); Aaron Bird 2/25 (4 overs); Mark Cameron 1/17 (4 overs)

New South Wales won by 2 runs
ANZ Stadium, Sydney Att: 11982
Umpires: AR Craig and SD Fry
Player of the match: Dirk Nannes (Vic)

== Knockout stage ==
=== Preliminary final ===
21 January 2009
18:45
(scorecard)

(H) Queensland; 6/112 (20 overs)	v	Victoria; 4/113 (18 overs)
Lee Carseldine 52 (55); Chris Hartley 27* (34); Dirk Nannes 2/20 (4 overs); Damien Wright 1/18 (4 overs)		Brad Hodge 59* (54); Adam Crosthwaite 40* (35); Ryan Harris 2/12 (3 overs); Nathan Rimmington 2/12 (4 overs)

Victoria won by 6 wickets with 12 balls remaining
Brisbane Cricket Ground, Brisbane
Attendance: 8,367
Umpires: PR Reiffel and RJ Tucker
Player of the match: Brad Hodge

- Broadcast by Fox Sports

=== Final ===
24 January 2009
19:15
(scorecard)

Victoria; 4/166 (20 overs)	v	New South Wales (H); 5/167 (20 overs)
Robert Quiney 91 (56); Andrew McDonald 30* (29); Aaron Bird 3/21 (4 overs); Doug Bollinger 1/31 (4 overs)		Ben Rohrer 44* (20); Phillip Hughes 43 (32); Shane Harwood 2/27 (4 overs); Bryce McGain 2/32 (4 overs)

New South Wales won by 5 wickets on the last ball
ANZ Stadium, Sydney
Attendance: 17,592
Umpires: BNJ Oxenford and RJ Tucker
Player of the match: Ben Rohrer

- Broadcast by Fox Sports

== Statistics ==
=== Highest Team Totals ===
Team	Total	Opponent	Ground
Victoria	5/203	Tasmania	Bellerive Oval
Tasmania	7/194	New South Wales	ANZ Stadium
Victoria	2/184	South Australia	Melbourne Cricket Ground
Tasmania	8/184	Queensland	Bellerive Oval
South Australia	5/183	Victoria	Melbourne Cricket Ground

=== Most Runs ===
Player	Team	Runs	Inns	Avg	S/R	HS	100s	50s
Lee Carseldine	Queensland	298	6	99.33	134.84	74	–	4
Brad Hodge	Victoria	262	6	65.50	119.63	75*	–	3
Daniel Harris	South Australia	200	5	40.00	149.25	98	–	1
Rhett Lockyear	Tasmania	179	5	35.80	167.28	52	–	2
David Hussey	Victoria	173	4	173.00	169.60	100*	1	1

=== Highest Scores ===
Player	Team	Score	Balls	4s	6s	Opponent	Ground
David Hussey	Victoria	100*	47	12	3	Tasmania	Bellerive Oval
Daniel Harris	South Australia	98	62	9	4	Victoria	Melbourne Cricket Ground
Robert Quiney	Victoria	91	56	4	8	New South Wales	ANZ Stadium
Phil Hughes	New South Wales	80*	60	8	1	Queensland	Brisbane Cricket Ground
Brad Hodge	Victoria	75*	61	6	1	South Australia	Melbourne Cricket Ground

=== Most Wickets ===
Player	Team	Wkts	Mts	Ave	S/R	Econ	BBI
Aaron Bird	New South Wales	13	6	14.08	10.6	7.96	3/21
Umar Gul	Western Australia	12	5	12.25	9.6	7.60	4/15
Dirk Nannes	Victoria	12	7	13.83	13.0	6.38	4/11
Chris Simpson	Queensland	9	6	18.33	14.6	7.50	3/27
Nathan Rimmington	Queensland	9	6	18.44	14.4	7.66	3/23

=== Best Bowling Figures ===
Player	Team	Overs	Figures	Opponent	Ground
Cameron White	Victoria	2.0	4/10	Western Australia	Melbourne Cricket Ground
Dirk Nannes	Victoria	4.0	4/11	New South Wales	ANZ Stadium
Umar Gul	Western Australia	3.2	4/15	South Australia	Adelaide Oval
Daniel Christian	South Australia	4.0	4/23	Tasmania	North Tasmania Cricket Association Ground
Ben Edmondson	Western Australia	4.0	4/25	Victoria	Melbourne Cricket Ground
