= Heritage Oval =

Sports ground in Toowoomba, Queensland

Coordinates: 27°32′32.15″S 151°57′47.62″E

Southern Cross Reserve
- Interactive map of Southern Cross Reserve

Ground information
- Location: Toowoomba, Australia
- Country: Australia
- Establishment: 1972 (first recorded match)
- Capacity: 10,000

Team information
Queensland	(1994 & 2007)
- As of 21 October 2011; Source: Ground profile

Southern Cross Reserve, also known as Heritage Oval, is a sports ground in Toowoomba, Queensland, Australia located in the suburb of Harlaxton. It is used primarily for cricket and Australian rules football.

The first recorded match on the ground came in 1972 when Toowoomba played Queensland. It held its only first-class match in 1994 when Queensland played an England XI side, with the match ending in a victory by 37 runs for the England XI. The ground later held a Twenty20 match in the 2006–07 Big Bash when Queensland played Victoria, with Queensland winning by 38 runs.

A Youth Test match was held there in 1997 when Australia Under-19s played Pakistan Under-19s.

The oval also serves as the home ground of the South Toowoomba Bombers, who play in the AFL Darling Downs competition
