= Glen Batticciotto =

Australian cricketer

Personal information
- Full name: Glen Charles Batticciotto
- Born: 18 August 1981 (age 45); Redcliffe, Queensland, Australia
- Batting: Left-handed
- Bowling: Right-arm medium
- Role: Batsman

Domestic team information
- Years: Team
- 2008/09–2009/10: Queensland

Career statistics
Competition	FC	LA	T20
Matches	5	9	11
Runs scored	177	179	107
Batting average	22.12	29.83	17.83
100s/50s	1/0	0/1	0/0
Top score	101	54*	38
Balls bowled	90	–	–
Wickets	1	–	–
Bowling average	37.00	–	–
5 wickets in innings	0	–	–
10 wickets in match	0	–	–
Best bowling	1/37	–	–
Catches/stumpings	4/–	2/–	7/–
- Source: CricInfo, 20 May 2022

Glen Charles Batticciotto (born 18 August 1981) is an Australian cricketer who played for Queensland and the Australian under-19 side. A left-handed batsman and occasional right-arm medium pace bowler, Batticciotto began his career with the Queensland U-19 team and the Queensland Academy of Sport as well as playing for Australia in the U-19 World Cup. He made his List-A and Twenty20 debut for Queensland in 2008, before making his first class cricket debut on 13 October 2009 following a period of strong form which earned him the Peter Burge Medal.

== Career ==
Strong performances at club cricket level in Brisbane brought Batticciotto to the Australian U-19 team alongside Mitchell Johnson, Shane Watson and Michael Clarke. He made two appearances in January 2000 during the U-19 World Cup, however he failed at both opportunities. The first, against Ireland's U-19 on 13 January, saw Batticciotto score a first-ball duck. On 20 January, he faced Pakistan U-19, and was dismissed after three balls, again failing to score. Prolific play at club level continued, however, earning Batticciotto the Peter Burge Medal. He played out 2003 in England, playing club cricket and making appearances for Middlesex and Essex Second XIs. He played in the Lancashire League and East Anglia Premier Leagues through until 2008. Success brought a debut for Queensland on 19 November 2008, against New South Wales. He scored three from eight balls. On 26 December he took part in the KFC Twenty20 Big Bash, scoring 11 from 11 balls on debut, and on 13 October 2009, he faced Western Australia on his first class debut. He made 13 runs, and took one wicket for 37.
