= 2005–06 Twenty20 Big Bash =

Twenty20 domestic cricket of Australia 2005 -2006

2005–06 KFC Twenty20 Big Bash
- Administrator: Cricket Australia
- Cricket format: Twenty20
- Tournament format: Round-robin
- Champions: Victorian Bushrangers (1st title)
- Participants: 6
- Matches: 7
- Attendance: 68,829 (9,833 per match)
- Most runs: Brad Hodge (132)
- Most wickets: Shane Harwood (7)

The 2005–06 KFC Twenty20 Big Bash was the inaugural season of the official Twenty20 domestic cricket competition in Australia. The six states were represented by six teams. The Queensland Bulls and the Tasmanian Tigers played in the first match, with no result being declared due to rain. The six teams were split into two groups of three, with Victoria finishing on top of Group A and New South Wales on top of Group B. It consisted of seven matches, including the final. The Victorian Bushrangers won the inaugural tournament, defeating the New South Wales Blues in the final at North Sydney Oval.

== Group stages ==
=== Group A ===
| Team | Pld | W | T | L | NR | NRR | Pts |
|---|---|---|---|---|---|---|---|
| Victorian Bushrangers | 2 | 2 | 0 | 0 | 0 | 1.761 | 4 |
| Western Warriors | 2 | 1 | 0 | 1 | 0 | 1.300 | 2 |
| Southern Redbacks | 2 | 0 | 0 | 2 | 0 | −3.128 | 0 |

6 January 2006
18:45 (D/N)
Scorecard

| Victoria; 9/163 (20 overs) | v | Western Australia (home team); 7/161 (20 overs) |
| Liam Buchanan 47 (40); Ben Edmondson 3/16 (4 overs) | | Adam Voges 51 (41); Shane Harwood 2/21 (4 overs) |

Victorian Bushrangers won by 2 runs
WACA Ground, Perth
Umpires: Jeff Brookes and Andrew Craig
Player of the match: Cameron White (Vic)

- Western Warriors won the toss and elected to field.
- Attendance: 15,200

8 January 2006
15:30
Scorecard

| South Australia; 113 (19.2 overs) | v | Victoria (home team); 2/114 (12.1 overs) |
| Shane Deitz 34 (34); Shane Harwood 3/13 (3.2 overs) | | Jonathan Moss 41* (31); Darren Lehmann 1/12 (2 overs) |

Victorian Bushrangers won by 8 wickets
Junction Oval, Melbourne
Umpires: Gerard Abood and John Ward
Player of the match: Jonathan Moss (Vic)

- Victorian Bushrangers won the toss and elected to field.
- Attendance: 8,000

10 January 2006
18:30 (D/N)
Scorecard

| Western Australia; 6/174 (20 overs) | v | South Australia (home team); 120 (18.3 overs) |
| Ryan Campbell 55 (37); Dan Cullen 2/14 (3 overs) | | Ken Skewes 33 (25); Steve Magoffin 2/15 (3 overs) |

Western Warriors won by 54 runs
Adelaide Oval, Adelaide
Umpires: Andy Collins and Simon Fry

- Southern Redbacks won the toss and elected to field.
- Attendance: 14,928

=== Group B ===
| Team | Pld | W | T | L | NR | NRR | Pts |
|---|---|---|---|---|---|---|---|
| New South Wales Blues | 2 | 2 | 0 | 0 | 0 | 2.218 | 4 |
| Queensland Bulls | 2 | 0 | 0 | 1 | 1 | −0.983 | 1 |
| Tasmanian Tigers | 2 | 0 | 0 | 1 | 1 | −3.450 | 1 |

6 January 2006
18:30 (D/N)
Scorecard

| (home team) Queensland; 7/136 (20 overs) | v | Tasmania; 1/15 (3.1 overs) |
| Jimmy Maher 59 (51); Ben Hilfenhaus 3/17 (4 overs) | | Michael Di Venuto 5 (11); Mitchell Johnson 1/9 (2 overs) |

No result
The Gabba, Brisbane
Umpires: Tim Laycock and Bruce Oxenford

- Tasmanian Tigers won the toss and elected to field.
- Heavy rain and hail stopped play after 3.1 overs of Tasmania's innings.
- Attendance: 10,083

8 January 2006
16:00
Scorecard

| Queensland; 167 (17.3 overs) | v | New South Wales (home team); 5/168 (18 overs) |
| Michael Buchanan 48 (27); Ian Moran 3/21 (3 overs) | | Dominic Thornely 57* (38); Derek Tate 2/28 (4 overs) |

New South Wales Blues won by 5 wickets
North Sydney Oval, Sydney
Umpires: Nick Fowler and Rod Tucker

- Queensland Bulls won the toss and elected to bat.
- Attendance: 10,470

10 January 2006
16:00
Scorecard

| New South Wales; 6/188 (20 overs) | v | Tasmania (home team); 119 (17.3 overs) |
| Phil Jaques 61 (30); Adam Polkinghorne 3/31 (4 overs) | | Xavier Doherty 33 (29); Matt Nicholson 2/18 (3 overs) |

New South Wales Blues won by 69 runs
Bellerive Oval, Hobart
Umpires: Ken McGinniss and Brian Muir
Player of the match: Phil Jaques (NSW)

- Tasmanian Tigers won the toss and elected to field.
- Attendance: 4,479

== Final ==
21 January 2006
14:00
Scorecard

| Victoria; 7/233 (20 overs) | v | New South Wales (home team); 140 (15.3 overs) |
| Brad Hodge 106 (54); Aaron Bird 3/39 (4 overs) | | Craig Simmons 39 (21); Cameron White 3/8 (2 overs) |

Victorian Bushrangers won by 93 runs
North Sydney Oval, Sydney
Umpires: Nick Fowler and Rod Tucker

- Victorian Bushrangers won the toss and elected to bat.
- Attendance: 5,669
