= Jarrad Burke =

Australian cricketer (born 1983)

Jarrad Nathan Burke (born 7 January 1983) is an Australian cricketer who played Twenty20 cricket for the New South Wales Blues. He is a left-handed batsman and a slow left-arm orthodox bowler. He did not play any first-class or List A cricket for New South Wales.

== See also ==
- List of New South Wales representative cricketers
- List of New South Wales Twenty20 cricketers
