= Stephen Phillips (cricketer) =

Australian cricketer (born 1980)

Personal information
- Full name: Stephen Justin Phillips
- Born: 30 May 1980 (age 46); Fairfield, New South Wales, Australia
- Batting: Right-handed

Domestic team information
- Years: Team
- 2005/06: New South Wales
- Source: ESPNcricinfo, 15 January 2017

Stephen Justin Phillips (born 30 May 1980) is an Australian former cricketer. He played two Twenty20 matches for New South Wales in the 2005–06 Twenty20 Big Bash.

== See also ==
- List of New South Wales representative cricketers
