= Brad Knowles =

Australian cricketer (born 1981)

Personal information
- Full name: Bradley Aaron Knowles
- Born: 29 October 1981 (age 45); Moe, Victoria, Australia
- Nickname: Beyonce
- Height: 179 cm (5 ft 10 in)
- Batting: Left-handed
- Bowling: Right-arm fast
- Role: Bowler

Domestic team information
- Years: Team
- 2003/04–2004/05: Victoria
- 2008/09–2011/12: Western Australia
- FC debut: 23 November 2004 Victoria v New South Wales
- Last FC: 10 March 2010 Western Australia v Queensland
- LA debut: 21 February 2004 Victoria v Western Australia
- Last LA: 17 February 2010 Western Australia v Tasmania

Career statistics
Competition	FC	LA	T20
Matches	9	20	5
Runs scored	140	85	15
Batting average	17.50	14.16	15.00
100s/50s	0/0	0/0	0/0
Top score	36	23	14
Balls bowled	1,579	964	114
Wickets	33	26	9
Bowling average	27.39	29.15	15.77
5 wickets in innings	0	1	0
10 wickets in match	0	0	0
Best bowling	4/32	5/62	3/20
Catches/stumpings	3/–	4/–	1/–
- Source: CricketArchive, 15 December 2010

Bradley Aaron Knowles (born 29 October 1981) is an Australian cricketer who previously played domestically for Victoria and Western Australia. A right-arm fast bowler, Knowles made his Pura Cup debut for Victoria against New South Wales in 2004–05, as a replacement for Mick Lewis. Knowles lost his Cricket Victoria contract at the end of an "injury interrupted" 2006/07 season, although he played a match for Victoria after that. Knowles moved to Western Australia for the 2008/09 season and, after showing form in the local competition, was given two opportunities with the Western Warriors at the end of the season. In the latter of the two matches, Knowles had career best bowling figures of 5/42. He was subsequently signed by the Warriors for the 2009/10 season. Following an "impressive" first season for the Warriors, in which he was the team's second leading wicket taker, Knowles injured his knee before the start of the 2010/11 season, causing him to miss the entire season.
