= Asad Pathan =

Indian cricketer (born 1984)

Personal information
- Full name: Asad Ullah Khan Pathan
- Born: 17 June 1984 (age 42); Ankleshwar, Gujarat, India
- Batting: Right-handed
- Bowling: Right-arm medium
- Role: Batsman

Domestic team information
- Years: Team
- 2009/10; 2014–2018: Railways
- 2011–2013: Gujarat
- 2011–2012: Royal Challengers Bangalore
- LA debut: 22 February 2012 Gujarat v Maharashtra
- T20 debut: 20 October 2012 Railways v Uttar Pradesh

Career statistics
Competition	FC	LA	T20
Matches	2	20	34
Runs scored	28	383	656
Batting average	7	19.15	23.42
100s/50s	0/0	0/2	0/4
Top score	24	63	87*
Catches/stumpings	0/0	2/–	8/0

Asad Ullah Khan Pathan is an Indian cricketer. He currently plays for Railways, previously played for Gujarat, played t10 in Dubai, played six games in IPL for Royal Challengers Bangalore
