= Luke Towers =

Australian cricketer (born 1988)

Luke James Charles Towers (born 18 June 1988) is an Australian cricketer who previously played for Western Australia as an opening batsman.

Originally from Bunbury, he made his first-class debut for the Warriors in February 2009 following consistent performances for his club side Melville and carrying his bat in making 143 not out for the WA Second XI against the Queensland Academy of Sport. He made his List A debut in October 2009.

He made his maiden first-class century in December 2009, scoring a chanceless 124 against Tasmania at Bellerive Oval. This followed speculation that his poor performances in the first four games of the season would see Towers struggle to maintain his position in the side.

In the English 2009 summer, Towers played for Totton and Eling Cricket Club in the Southern Premier Cricket League and the Hampshire Second XI in the Second XI Championship. His best performance in an otherwise lean season for Totton and Eling was scoring 99 not out from 68 balls in the opening round of the Southern Electric T20 Cup. He was more successful playing for Hampshire Second XI, top scoring for the side with 553 runs at an average of 110.60, including a high score of 212 not out and two other centuries.

On 6 February 2011 Towers was the substitute fieldsman for Australia in the 7th ODI against England in Perth, Western Australia.
