= Sarul Kanwar =

Indian cricketer (born 1987)

Personal information
- Full name: Sarul Kanwar
- Born: 8 November 1987 (age 39); Saharanpur, Uttar Pradesh, India
- Batting: Right-handed
- Bowling: Right-arm off break
- Role: Opening Batsman

Domestic team information
- Years: Team
- 2010–2012: Punjab
- 2011: Mumbai Indians (squad no. 88)
- 2018: Uttar Pradesh
- 2021–: Chandigarh

Career statistics
Competition	FC	LA	T20
Matches	6	2	9
Runs scored	556	21	189
Batting average	50.54	10.50	21.00
100s/50s	2/2	0/0	0/0
Top score	130	21	49
Catches/stumpings	2/–	0/–	4/–
- Source: ESPNcricinfo, 10 October 2011

Sarul Kanwar (born 8 November 1987), is an Indian cricketer. An attacking opening batsman from Punjab, he has 2 first-class centuries for Punjab in the last two Ranji Trophy seasons.

== Career ==
In 2001, he left his home town Saharanpur to Chandigarh to play cricket for Punjab. He improved his game and started practicing in the Sector 16 Stadium under coach Harish Sharma. He put on many impressive performances in the next eight years. In the Katoch Shield in 2008, he scored 746 runs including 3 centuries. In the Nayudu Under-22 Championships, he scored 610 runs. He was playing in the Punjab "B" Team then. His contributions led to Punjab winning these titles. His performances were rewarded with a Ranji Trophy camp call-up for the first time. He was selected in Punjab's 2010 Ranji Trophy season.

He made his first-class debut for Punjab in 2010, and List A debut in 2011, Kanwar has been impressive in his first-class career since. In his first Ranji Trophy season in 2010, he topped 500 runs, with 2 centuries.

His Twenty20 exploits were not as successful, yet he landed an Indian Premier League contract with the Mumbai Indians. Despite not getting a game in the 2011 IPL, when he finally got a chance in the 2011 Champions League Twenty20 in an injury ravaged Mumbai Indians side, he quickly grabbed it with a rapacious 45 off 21 balls versus South African franchise Cape Cobras with 3 fours and 5 sixes. He was then looking for another six but was caught by Owais Shah off a Robin Peterson delivery near the boundary. The Mumbai Indians amassed 176 thanks to another 58 by Kieron Pollard. The match eventually finished a no result due to rain. He was bought out by his team in favour of Mumbai batsman Sushant Marathe for IPL 5. Kanwar has now started practising with Sunrise Cricket Academy under Jitendra Kumar. Jitendra has been associated with Punjab Kings as side arm king.
