= Twenty20 Big Bash =

Cricket Tournament

KFC Twenty20 Big Bash
- KFC Twenty20 Big Bash Logo
- Countries: Australia
- Administrator: Cricket Australia
- Format: Twenty20
- First edition: 2005–06
- Latest edition: 2010–11
- Tournament format: Double round-robin and knockout finals
- Number of teams: 6
- Current champion: Southern Redbacks (1st title)
- Most successful: Victorian Bushrangers (4 titles)
- Most runs: Brad Hodge (919)
- Most wickets: Dirk Nannes (31)

The KFC Twenty20 Big Bash was a domestic Twenty20 cricket competition in Australia. The competition was organised by Cricket Australia, and sponsored by fast food chicken outlet KFC.

Running over six seasons from 2005–06 to 2010–11, the KFC Twenty20 Big Bash was the first top level domestic Twenty20 competition in Australia, contested by the six traditional Sheffield Shield state cricket teams. The competition was replaced by the franchise-based Big Bash League from 2011–12.

Victoria was the most successful team during the tournament's running, winning four out of the six titles.

== Teams ==
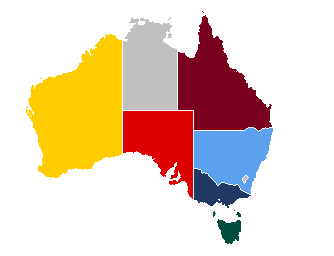

Team name (Sponsored name)	Home ground(s)	Last win	Wins	Runners up
Victorian Bushrangers	Melbourne Cricket Ground, Melbourne	2009–10	4	1
New South Wales Blues	Sydney Cricket Ground, ANZ Stadium, Sydney	2008–09	1	2
Southern Redbacks	Adelaide Oval, Adelaide	2010–11	1	1
Tasmanian Tigers	Bellerive Oval, Hobart	—N/a	0	1
Western Warriors	The WACA, Perth	—N/a	0	1
Queensland Bulls	The Gabba, Brisbane	—N/a	0	0

== Placings ==
Season	Winner	Runner-up	Third	Fourth	Fifth	Sixth
2005–06	Victoria	New South Wales	Western Australia	Queensland	South Australia	Tasmania
2006–07	Victoria	Tasmania	Western Australia	South Australia	Queensland	New South Wales
2007–08	Victoria	Western Australia	Tasmania	New South Wales	Queensland	South Australia
2008–09	New South Wales	Victoria	Queensland	South Australia	Western Australia	Tasmania
2009–10	Victoria	South Australia	Queensland	Western Australia	New South Wales	Tasmania
2010–11	South Australia	New South Wales	Tasmania	Western Australia	Queensland	Victoria

== Finals ==
Year	Final Venue	Final Attendance	Final		
Year	Final Venue	Final Attendance	Winner	Result	Runner-up
2005–06; Details	North Sydney Oval, Sydney	5,669	(Victoria (state)) Victoria; 233 for 7 (20 overs)	Victoria won by 93 runs Scorecard	(New South Wales) New South Wales; 140 all out (15.3 overs)
2006–07; Details	Melbourne Cricket Ground, Melbourne	28,960	(Victoria (state)) Victoria; 160 for 6 (20 overs)	Victoria won by 10 runs Scorecard	(Tasmania) Tasmania; 150 for 8 (20 overs)
2007–08; Details	WACA, Perth	16,589	(Victoria (state)) Victoria; 203 for 8 (20 overs)	Victoria won by 32 runs Scorecard	(Western Australia) Western Australia; 171 all out (19.3 overs)
2008–09; Details	ANZ Stadium, Sydney	17,592	(New South Wales) New South Wales; 167 for 5 (20 overs)	New South Wales won by 5 wickets Scorecard	(Victoria (state)) Victoria; 166 for 4 (20 overs)
2009–10; Details	Adelaide Oval, Adelaide	17,722	(Victoria (state)) Victoria; 166 for 7 (20 overs)	Victoria won by 48 runs Scorecard	(South Australia) South Australia; 118 for 9 (20 overs)
2010–11; Details	Adelaide Oval, Adelaide	27,920	(South Australia) South Australia; 155 for 2 (17.3 overs)	South Australia won by 8 wickets Scorecard	(New South Wales) New South Wales; 153 for 8 (20 overs)

== Records ==
- Highest Score: 7/233 Victorian Bushrangers vs New South Wales Blues, 21 Jan 2006, at North Sydney Oval.
- Lowest Score: 71 (16.2 overs) New South Wales, vs Western Warriors, 5 Jan 2010, at WACA Ground.
- Biggest Winning Margin: 127 Western Warriors vs New South Wales Blues, 5 Jan 2010, at WACA Ground.
- Lowest Winning Margin: 2 Victorian Bushrangers vs Western Warriors, 6 Jan 2006, at WACA Ground, Perth.
  New South Wales Blues vs Victorian Bushrangers, 17 Jan 2009, at ANZ Stadium, Sydney.
- Highest Individual Score: 111 (56 balls) Michael Dighton, Tasmanian Tigers vs New South Wales Blues, 10 Jan 2007, at ANZ Stadium, Sydney.
- Most Runs: Brad Hodge (919).
- Fastest Half-Century: 18 Balls David Warner, New South Wales Blues vs Tasmanian Tigers, 30 Dec 2009 Bellerive Oval, Hobart
- Best Bowling: 6/25 (3 overs) Michael Dighton, Tasmanian Tigers vs Queensland Bulls, 1 Jan 2007, at The Heritage Oval, Toowoomba.
- Most Wickets: See Infobox.
- Most Catches: 13 David Hussey, Victorian Bushrangers.
- Largest Crowd: 43,125 – Victorian Bushrangers vs Tasmanian Tigers, 15 Jan 2010 at the Melbourne Cricket Ground.

== Television coverage ==
All games, including the finals were covered by Fox Sports.
