= 2006–07 Twenty20 Big Bash =

Twenty20 Big Bash 2006–07
- Administrator: Cricket Australia
- Cricket format: Twenty20
- Tournament format: Single round-robin
- Champions: Victoria (2nd title)
- Participants: 6
- Matches: 12, plus final
- Most runs: Brad Hodge (Vic) 172 (122 balls)
- Most wickets: Mick Lewis (Vic) 9 (79 runs 11.2 overs)

The 2006–07 KFC Twenty20 Big Bash was the second season of official Twenty20 domestic cricket in Australia. Six teams representing six states in Australia participated in the competition. The competition was won by the Victorian Bushrangers for the second time after they defeated the Tasmanian Tigers at the Melbourne Cricket Ground.

== Table ==
Teams receive 2 points for a win, 1 for a tie or no result, and 0 for a loss.

Pos	Team	Pld	W	L	T	NR	Pts	NRR
1	Victorian Bushrangers	4	3	0	0	1	7	2.433
2	Tasmanian Tigers	4	2	1	0	1	5	1.400
3	Western Warriors	4	2	2	0	0	4	−0.324
4	Southern Redbacks	4	2	2	0	0	4	−0.775
5	Queensland Bulls	4	2	2	0	0	4	−0.750
6	New South Wales Blues	4	0	4	0	0	0	−1.000

== Teams ==
Club	Home ground	Captain
New South Wales Blues	Telstra Stadium	Simon Katich
Queensland Bulls	Brisbane Cricket Ground	James Hopes
Southern Redbacks	Adelaide Oval	Darren Lehmann
Tasmanian Tigers	Bellerive Oval	George Bailey
Victorian Bushrangers	Melbourne Cricket Ground	Cameron White
Western Warriors	WACA Ground	Marcus North

== Fixtures ==
1 January 2007
report

Queensland; 9/202 (20 overs)	v	Tasmania; 184 (18.1 overs)

Queensland won by 38 runs
Heritage Oval, Toowoomba, Att: 4,602

1 January 2007
report

Western Australia; 4/194 (20 overs)	v	New South Wales; 8/168 (20 overs)

Western Australia won by 26 runs
WACA Ground, Perth

1 January 2007
report

Victoria; 7/203 (20 overs)	v	South Australia; 8/169 (20 overs)

Victoria won by 34 runs
Adelaide Oval, Adelaide

4 January 2007
report

Western Australia; 4/193 (20 overs)	v	South Australia; 138 (20 overs)

Western Australia won by 55 runs
WACA Ground, Perth

4 January 2007
report

Tasmania	v	Victoria

Match abandoned without a ball bowled
Bellerive Oval, Hobart

- Constant drizzle from 30 mins prior to the start of the match prevented any play. The match was abandoned at 5.45 pm.

5 January 2007
report

Queensland; 7/173 (20 overs)	v	New South Wales; 8/164 (20 overs)

Queensland won by 9 runs
Brisbane Cricket Ground, Brisbane, Att: 27,653

7 January 2007
report

South Australia; 9/150 (20 overs)	v	New South Wales; 9/142 (20 overs)

South Australia won by 8 runs
No. 1 Sports Ground, Newcastle

7 January 2007
report

Tasmania; 4/208 (20 overs)	v	Western Australia; 8/123 (20 overs)

Tasmania won by 85 runs
Bellerive Oval, Hobart

7 January 2007
report

Victoria; 6/194 (20 overs)	v	Queensland; 106 (16.2 overs)

Victoria won by 34 runs
Melbourne Cricket Ground, Melbourne

10 January 2007
report

Western Australia; 6/201 (20 overs)	v	Victoria; 5/206 (18.1 overs)

Victoria won by 5 wickets
Melbourne Cricket Ground, Melbourne

10 January 2007
report

Tasmania; 7/202 (20 overs)	v	New South Wales; 165 (19.5 overs)

Tasmania won by 37 runs
Telstra Stadium, Sydney, Att: 18,462

10 January 2007
report

South Australia; 6/147 (20 overs)	v	Queensland; 128 (18.2 overs)

South Australia won by 19 runs
Adelaide Oval, Adelaide

=== Final ===
13 January 2007
report

Victoria; 6/160 (20 overs)	v	Tasmania; 8/150 (20 overs)

Victoria won by 10 runs
Melbourne Cricket Ground, Melbourne, Att: 28,960
