= Daniel Smith (Australian cricketer) =

Australian cricketer (born 1982)

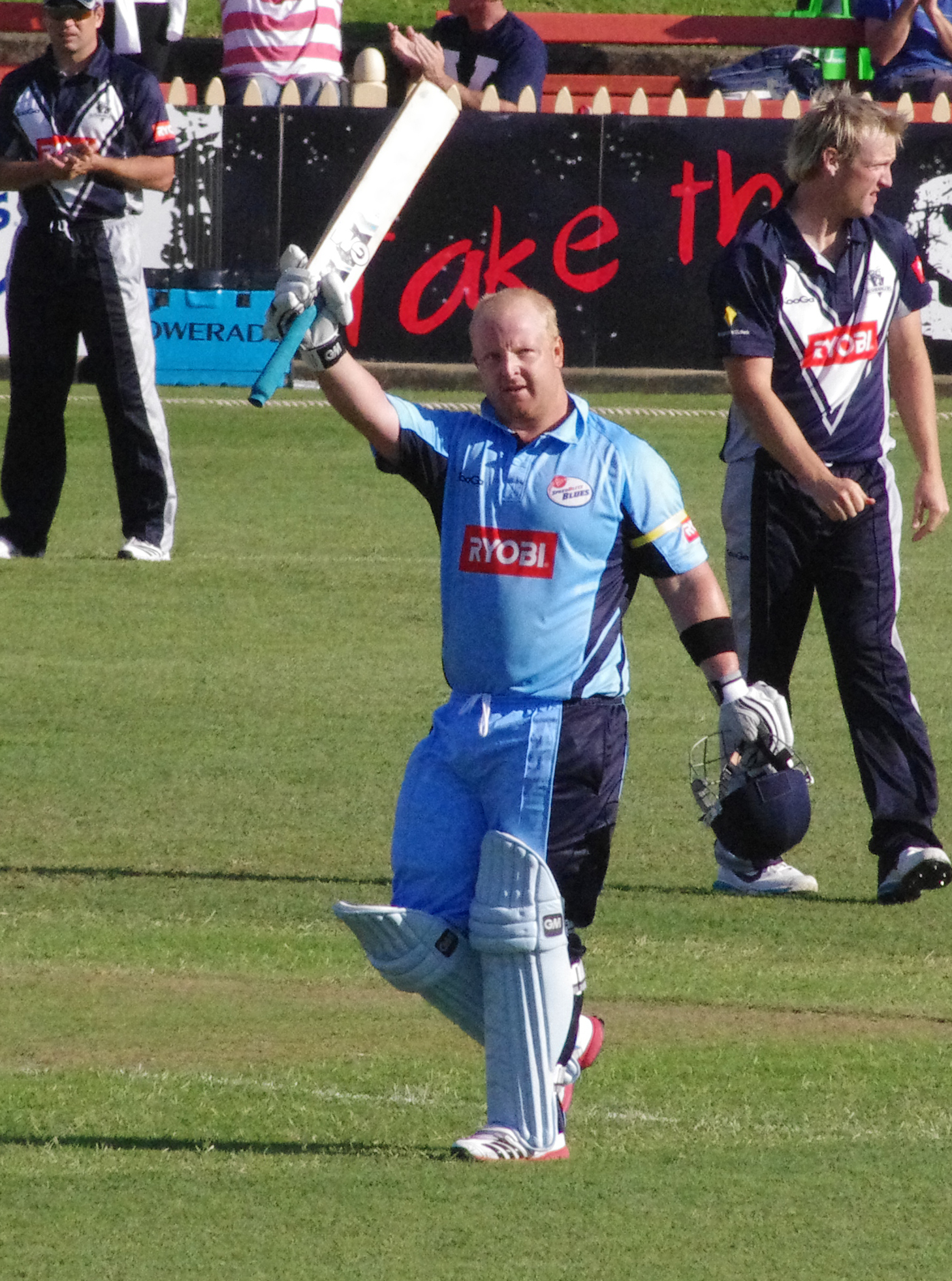
- Daniel Smith acknowledges the crowd after making a century against Victoria in Ryobi One-Day Cup, 2011.

Personal information
- Born: 17 March 1982 (age 44); Westmead, Sydney, Australia
- Nickname: Tugboat
- Height: 1.79 m (5 ft 10 in)
- Batting: Right-handed
- Role: Wicket-keeper

Domestic team information
- Years: Team
- 2005–2012: New South Wales (squad no. 13)
- 2011–2012: Sydney Thunder
- 2012–2014: Sydney Sixers (squad no. 13)

Career statistics
Competition	FC	LA	T20
Matches	25	30	44
Runs scored	828	720	522
Batting average	24.35	32.72	15.05
100s/50s	0/6	1/1	0/1
Top score	96	179*	62
Catches/stumpings	86/1	21/2	13/6
- Source: ESPNcricinfo, 11 October 2020

Daniel Lindsay Richard Smith (born 17 March 1982, Westmead, Sydney, New South Wales) is a former Australian cricketer. He played for New South Wales in the Pura Cup and Ford Ranger Cup competitions. He was involved in the thrilling 2008–09 KFC Twenty20 Big Bash final, scoring 1 not out and running through for a quick bye on the last ball to secure victory for the Blues. Smith also starred in the 2009 Champions League Twenty20 for the victorious NSW Blues. Daniel was the equal leading wicketkeeper for the series with four dismissals including 3 stumpings.

He plays for Sydney Cricket Club in the Sydney Grade Cricket Competition as a top order batsman, as well as a wicket-keeper.

Smith had consolidated his spot in the NSW team as Brad Haddin's understudy with some very handy first class innings.

He retired from Domestic one day and cricket and first class cricket following the season 2011–12.

Smith was the leading run scorer for NSW Blues in the Ryobi One day cup in 2011–12 season.

He is current holder of the NSW record for highest one day score of all time 179* in 2011–12 season.

Smith is also the assistant coach of NSW KFC Big Bash franchise Sydney Thunder, and a squad member as a wicket-keeper/batsman, and also captained the team in the absence of David Warner in the National team.

In 2012–13 Smith played in the inaugural Sri Lankan Premier League for the Basnahira Cricket Dundee. He has also signed for the Sydney Sixers in the second of the KFC Big Bash League.

== Career Best Performances ==
Updated 27 October 2010

	Batting			
	Score	Fixture	Venue	Season
FC	96	New South Wales v South Australia	Sydney Cricket Ground	2008
LA	179*	New South Wales Blues v Victorian Bushrangers	North Sydney Oval	2011
T20	62	New South Wales Blues v Royal Challengers Bangalore	M. Chinnaswamy Stadium	2011

== See also ==
- List of New South Wales representative cricketers
