= James Smith (South Australia cricketer) =

Australian cricketer (born 1988)

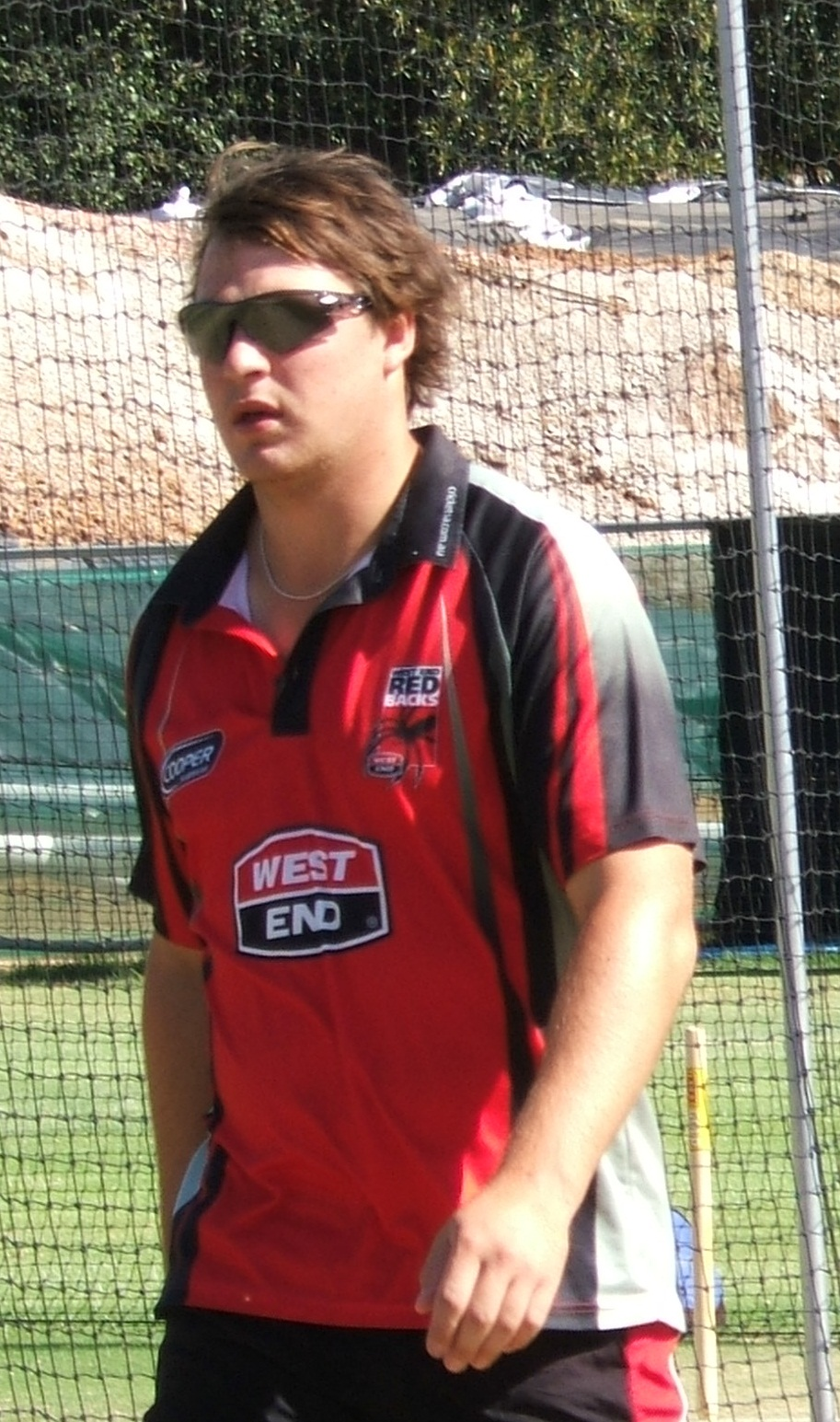
- Smith in 2010

Personal information
- Full name: James David Smith
- Born: 11 October 1988 (age 38); Murray Bridge, South Australia
- Batting: Right-handed
- Bowling: Right-arm off break
- Role: Batsman

Domestic team information
- Years: Team
- 2006/07–2012/13: South Australia

Career statistics
Competition	FC	LA	T20
Matches	27	10	2
Runs scored	1,272	159	20
Batting average	26.50	17.66	10.00
100s/50s	1/11	0/1	0/0
Top score	116	68	15
Balls bowled	18	0	6
Wickets	0	–	1
Bowling average	–	–	15.00
5 wickets in innings	–	–	0
10 wickets in match	–	–	0
Best bowling	–	–	1/15
Catches/stumpings	19/0	8/0	0/0
- Source: ESPNcricinfo, 27 October 2015

James David Smith (born 11 October 1988) is an Australian former cricketer. A right-handed batsman and occasional right-arm off break bowler, he played first-class cricket for South Australia between 2007 and 2012. He scored a century against Tasmania in late 2009, but did not repeat the feat again at state level. He was released by South Australia at the end of the 2012–13 season. In all, he scored 1,272 runs in 27 first-class matches at an average of 26.50. He also appeared ten times in List A matches, and twice in Twenty20 competitions, making one Big Bash League appearance, for the Adelaide Strikers in late 2012.

He is the older brother of Kelvin Smith, who made his debut for South Australia in the season following James' release.
