= Daniel Harris (cricketer) =

Australian cricketer (born 1979)

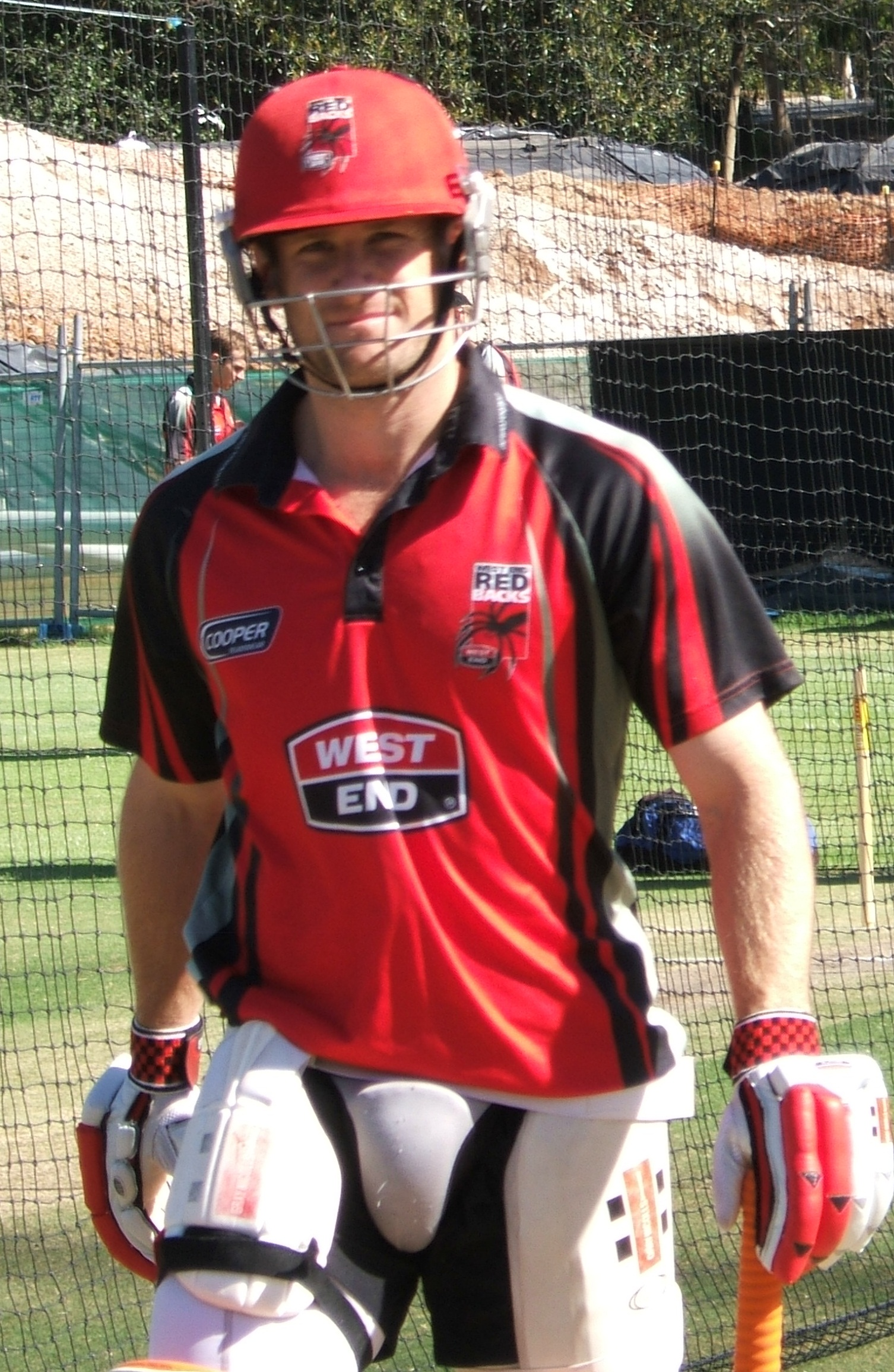

Personal information
- Full name: Daniel Joseph Harris
- Born: 31 December 1979 (age 46); North Adelaide, South Australia
- Height: 175 cm (5 ft 9 in)
- Batting: Right-handed
- Bowling: Right-arm medium
- Role: Batsman

Domestic team information
- Years: Team
- 1999/00–2011/12: South Australia
- 2011/12: Adelaide Strikers
- 2012: Deccan Chargers
- 2012: Ruhuna Royals
- 2012/13–2013/14: Melbourne Renegades
- 2013: Khulna Royal Bengals
- 2013/14–2014/15: Northern Districts

Career statistics
Competition	FC	LA	T20
Matches	58	49	78
Runs scored	3,329	1,195	1,965
Batting average	31.11	24.89	29.77
100s/50s	5/21	0/9	1/9
Top score	166*	79	108*
Balls bowled	1,226	110	400
Wickets	13	1	21
Bowling average	44/.15	121.00	24.61
5 wickets in innings	0	0	0
10 wickets in match	0	0	0
Best bowling	4/71	1/24	3/18
Catches/stumpings	55/–	17/–	30/–
- Source: ESPNcricinfo, 1 December 2021

Daniel Joseph Harris (born 31 December 1979) is an Australian former cricketer who played for South Australia, Adelaide Strikers, Melbourne Renegades and the Deccan Chargers.

Harris retired from professional cricket in 2014 to become a full-time doctor.

== Playing career ==
Harris is a regular player for South Australia in all 3 forms of the game and played a pivotal role in helping the Redbacks win the 2010–11 KFC Twenty20 Big Bash. His outstanding season was rewarded by being named the Australian Cricketers Association's Twenty20 Player of the Year.

Harris was picked up by Deccan Chargers to play in Indian Premier League during the 2012 IPL player auction.

Harris also signed with the Melbourne Renegades for the second season of the Big Bash League in 2012.

== Personal life ==
Harris is a qualified medical doctor.
