= Dominic Thornely =

Australian cricketer

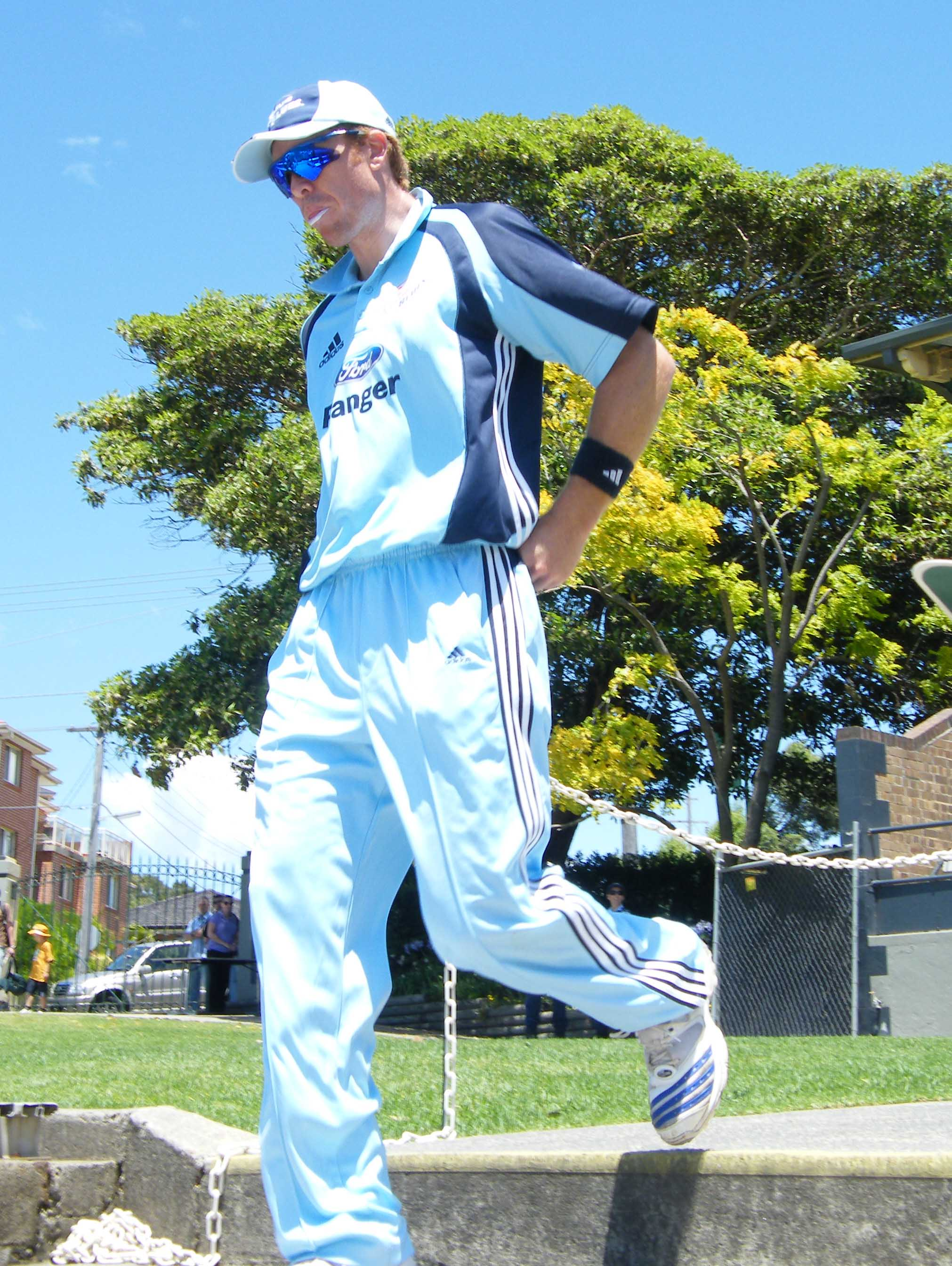

Personal information
- Full name: Dominic John Thornely
- Born: 1 October 1978 (age 48); Albury, New South Wales, Australia
- Height: 1.97 m (6 ft 6 in)
- Batting: Right-handed
- Bowling: Right-arm medium Right-arm off spin
- Role: Batsman

Domestic team information
- Years: Team
- 2001/02–2010/11: New South Wales
- 2005: Surrey
- 2006: Hampshire
- 2008: Mumbai Indians
- 2011/12–2012/13: Sydney Sixers

Career statistics
Competition	FC	LA	T20
Matches	83	100	57
Runs scored	5,166	2,406	778
Batting average	42.69	29.34	21.02
100s/50s	10/29	2/15	0/3
Top score	261*	108	67*
Balls bowled	4,822	2,005	533
Wickets	56	52	28
Bowling average	39.83	32.86	24.50
5 wickets in innings	0	0	0
10 wickets in match	0	0	0
Best bowling	3/38	3/17	4/22
Catches/stumpings	51/–	31/–	23/–
- Source: , 17 August 2009

Dominic John Thornely (born 1 October 1978) is an Australian former first-class cricketer who played for the New South Wales cricket team in Australian domestic cricket.

Thornely made his debut for New South Wales aged 25 and made his maiden first-class century with 143 against Victoria at Newcastle. He went on to receive Australia A selection in his debut season. He held an Australian Cricket Academy scholarship in 1997.

He had an outstanding 2004–05 series in the Pura Cup scoring 1065 runs at 62.65 with 4 centuries, helping NSW to win the competition. His highest score of 261 was made against Western Australia at the SCG and in it he beat the record of David Hookes for most sixes in an Australian domestic game with 11. Another record came in his 219-run stand for the last wicket with Stuart MacGill. MacGill only contributed 27 of those runs.

He played county cricket with Surrey in 2005 and for Hampshire in 2007. He represented Mumbai Indians in the Indian Premier League 2008 season.
