= Victoria cricket team =

Australian domestic cricket team

Personnel
- Captain: Will Sutherland (FC); Peter Handscomb (List A)
- Coach: Chris Rogers

Team information
- Colours: Navy blue White; Grey; Gold
- Founded: 1851; 175 years ago
- Home ground: Melbourne Cricket Ground; Junction Oval
- Capacity: 100,024; 7,000

History
- First-class debut: Tasmania in 1851 at Launceston
- Sheffield Shield wins: 32 (1893, 1895, 1898, 1899, 1907, 1908, 1915, 1922, 1924, 1925, 1928, 1930, 1931, 1934, 1935, 1937, 1947, 1951, 1963, 1967, 1970, 1974, 1979, 1980, 1991, 2004, 2009, 2010, 2015, 2016, 2017, 2019)
- One-Day Cup wins: 6 (1972, 1980, 1995, 1999, 2011, 2018)
- KFC Twenty20 Big Bash wins: 4 (2006, 2007, 2008, 2010)
- Global Super League wins: 0
- Official website: Victorian Cricket Team; Facebook; Twitter; Instagram
First-class
One-day

The Victoria cricket team is an Australian first-class men's cricket team based in the Australian state of Victoria. The men's team, which first played in 1851, represents the state of Victoria in the Marsh Sheffield Shield first-class competition and the Marsh One Day Cup 50-over competition.

It was known as the Victorian Bushrangers between 1995 and 2018, before dropping the Bushrangers nickname and electing to be known as simply Victoria in all cricket competitions. Victoria shares home matches between the Melbourne Cricket Ground in East Melbourne and the Junction Oval in St Kilda. The team is administered by Cricket Victoria and draws its players primarily from Victoria's Premier Cricket competition along with players from throughout the country. Victoria also played in the now-defunct Twenty20 competition, the Twenty20 Big Bash, which was replaced by the franchise-based Big Bash League.

The Victorian cricket team is the second-most successful state team in Australian first-class cricket, having won 32 Sheffield Shield titles, the most recent of which was in the 2018–19 season. The Victorians have also claimed six One-Day Cups and four Big Bash tiles.

== History ==
The team's origins date back to the very start of Australian cricket when the Melbourne Cricket Club (MCC) was formed in 1838, and in that same year an MCC team played its first match against the Victorian Military. However, the first official inter-colonial (now interstate) game was contested between Port Phillip and Van Diemen's Land in 1851, in Launceston.

Victoria was the dominant force in the early days of Australian first-class cricket, winning two of the first three Sheffield Shield tournaments, and most of its early domestic friendly games against the other states. The first game between the great rivals Victoria and New South Wales was played at the Melbourne Cricket Ground (MCG) in 1856.

The annual Sheffield Shield tournament initially began in the 1892/93 season, contested by Victoria, New South Wales and South Australia. Victoria won that tournament by defeating both opponents twice each. During the history of the Shield, Victoria has won the competition 32 times, most recently in the 2018/19 season.

The Victorian Cricket Association, now Cricket Victoria, was founded in 1895 and since March 2018 has been based at its headquarters, the CitiPower Centre in St Kilda.

Victoria has featured a significant number of cricketing greats, such as Warwick Armstrong, Bill Woodfull, Bill Ponsford, Neil Harvey, Hugh Trumble, Lindsay Hassett, Dean Jones, Jack Blackham, Jack Ryder, Bill Lawry, Bob Cowper, Shane Warne, Keith Miller and Ian Redpath. (See here for a full listing of past players).

Victoria has been a powerful force in Australian cricket and the Australian cricket team has, at least until recent decades, never been short of Victorians in the line up.

The tradition of starting a cricket match at the MCG on Boxing Day also featured Victoria when they played New South Wales in 1965.

Victoria is the only first-class cricket team to have scored over 1,000 in an innings, which it achieved twice in the 1920s – 1,023 against Tasmania in 1922–23, and 1,107 against New South Wales in 1926–27.

== Identity ==
Throughout its history, Victoria's dominant colour has been navy blue, either in full when playing One-Day or Twenty20 competitions or on predominantly white kits in first-class cricket. The team logo replicates that of Cricket Victoria and has done so since the organisation chose to cease referring to the Bushrangers nickname when describing the men's team. The current major sponsor of the team is the CitiPower.

== Honours ==
- Sheffield Shield Titles – (32): 1892/93, 1894/95, 1897/98, 1898/99, 1900/01, 1907/08, 1914/15, 1921/22, 1923/24, 1924/25, 1927/28, 1929/30, 1930/31, 1933/34, 1934/35, 1936/37, 1946/47, 1950/51, 1962/63, 1966/67, 1969/70, 1973/74, 1978/79, 1979/80, 1990/91, 2003/04, 2008/09, 2009/10, 2014/15, 2015/16, 2016/17, 2018/19.
- National One Day Cup Titles – (6): 1971/72, 1979/80, 1994/95, 1998/99, 2010/11, 2018/19.
- KFC Twenty20 Big Bash Titles^{1} – (4): 2005/06, 2006/07, 2007/08, 2009/10

^{1} Now defunct competition

== Squad ==
Squad for the 2024/25 domestic season. Players with international caps are listed in bold.

No.	Name	Nationality	Birth date	Batting style	Bowling style	Notes
Batters
20	Dylan Brasher	Australia	15 March 2001 (age 25)	Left-handed	—N/a	
23	Josh Brown	Australia	26 December 1993 (age 32)	Right-handed	Right-arm off break	
22	Ashley Chandrasinghe	Australia	17 December 2001 (age 24)	Left-handed	—N/a	
–	Harry Dixon	Australia	16 February 2005 (age 21)	Left-handed	Right-arm off break	
54	**Peter Handscomb**	Australia	26 April 1991 (age 35)	Right-handed	—N/a	Marsh Cup captain
14	**Marcus Harris**	Australia	21 July 1992 (age 34)	Left-handed	Right-arm off break	
37	Campbell Kellaway	Australia	11 January 2002 (age 24)	Left-handed	—N/a	
10	**Will Pucovski**	Australia	2 February 1998 (age 28)	Right-handed	—N/a	
3	Tom Rogers	Australia	2 July 1999 (age 27)	Left-handed	—N/a	
2	**Matthew Short**	Australia	8 November 1995 (age 30)	Right-handed	Right-arm off break	Cricket Australia contract
All-rounders
32	**Glenn Maxwell**	Australia	14 October 1988 (age 38)	Right-handed	Right-arm off break	Cricket Australia contract
11	Jonathan Merlo	Australia	15 December 1998 (age 27)	Right-handed	Right-arm medium-fast	
12	**Will Sutherland**	Australia	27 October 1999 (age 26)	Right-handed	Right-arm medium-fast	Sheffield Shield captain
Wicket-keepers
8	Liam Blackford	Australia	10 January 2004 (age 22)	Left-handed	—N/a	
7	Sam Harper	Australia	10 December 1996 (age 29)	Right-handed	Right-arm medium	
8	Jai Lemire	Australia		Right-handed	—N/a	
Spin bowlers
9	Reiley Mark	Australia		Right-handed	Right-arm leg break	
28	**Todd Murphy**	Australia	15 November 2000 (age 25)	Left-handed	Right-arm off break	Cricket Australia contract
9	Doug Warren	Australia	17 July 2001 (age 25)	Left-handed	Left-arm orthodox	
Pace bowlers
–	Austin Anlezark	Australia	16 June 2005 (age 21)	Left-handed	Right-arm medium	
25	**Scott Boland**	Australia	11 March 1989 (age 37)	Right-handed	Right-arm fast-medium	Cricket Australia contract
26	Xavier Crone	Australia	19 December 1997 (age 28)	Right-handed	Right-arm fast-medium	
1	Sam Elliott	Australia	18 February 2000 (age 26)	Right-handed	Right-arm medium	
–	Harry Hoekstra	Australia	2 July 2006 (age 20)	Right-handed	Left-arm medium	
13	Cameron McClure	Australia	25 September 2001 (age 25)	Right-handed	Right-arm fast-medium	
17	Fergus O'Neill	Australia	27 January 2001 (age 25)	Right-handed	Right-arm fast-medium	
35	Tyler Pearson	Australia		Left-handed	Right-arm medium-fast	
35	Mitchell Perry	Australia	27 April 2000 (age 26)	Left-handed	Right-arm fast-medium	
64	**Peter Siddle**	Australia	25 November 1984 (age 41)	Right-handed	Right-arm fast-medium	

== Records ==
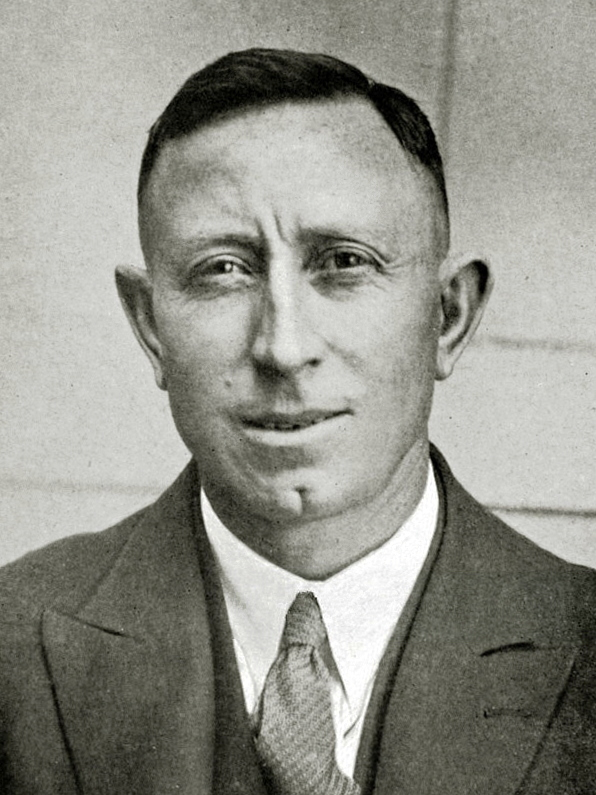
Jack Ryder scored 4613 runs at 50.14 for Victoria

First Class Batting Records for Victoria

Matches	Player	Runs	Average
140	Brad Hodge	10474	45.34
110	Dean Jones	9622	54.05
103	Matthew Elliott	9470	52.32
105	David Hussey	7476	45.58
135	Cameron White	7453	36.17
85	Bill Lawry	6615	52.92
76	Graham Yallop	5881	46.07
58	Lindsay Hassett	5535	63.62
76	Jason Arnberger	5504	42.01
43	Bill Ponsford	5413	83.27

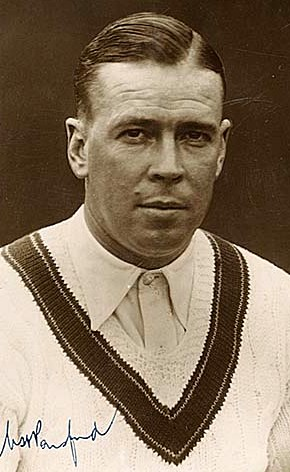
Victorian great Bill Ponsford

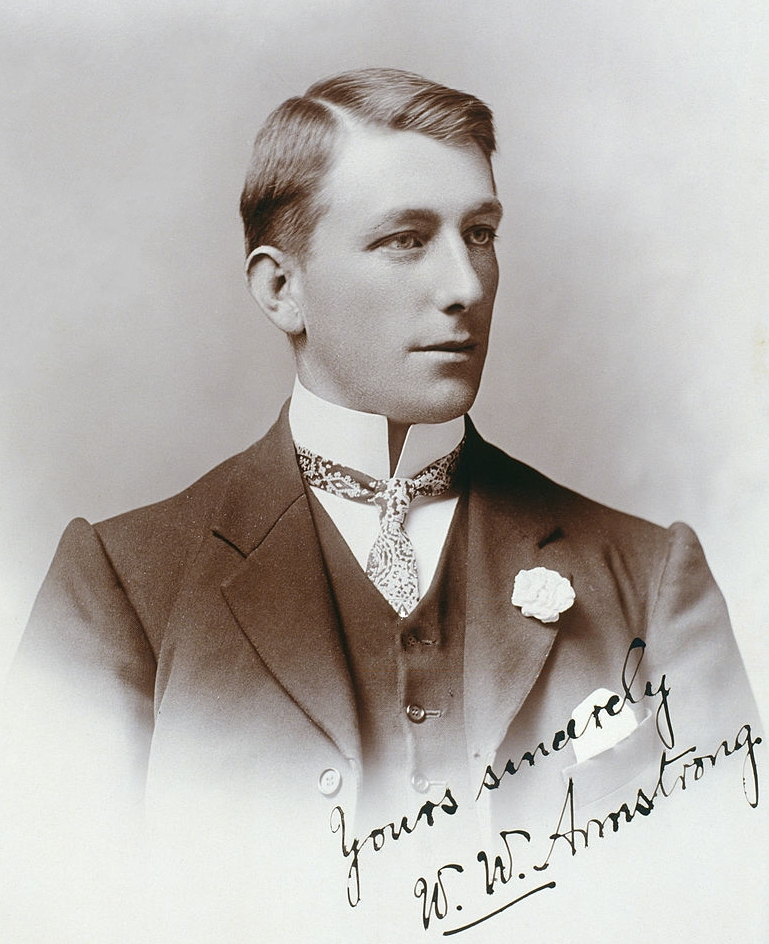
Warwick Armstrong scored 4497 runs for Victoria and took 177 wickets at 24.12

First Class Bowling Records for Victoria

Matches	Player	Wickets	Average
86	Paul Reiffel	318	25.91
71	Alan Connolly	297	26.07
94	Tony Dodemaide	281	31.61
76	Merv Hughes	267	30.59
75*	Scott Boland	253	26.60
101	Ray Bright	252	35.00
41	Chuck Fleetwood-Smith	246	24.52
75	Jim Higgs	240	29.88
61	Peter Siddle	233	24.13
67	Damien Fleming	221	30.20

List A Batting Records for Victoria

Matches	Player	Runs	Average
139	Brad Hodge	5597	47.03
120	Cameron White	3643	37.55
101	David Hussey	3546	43.77
78	Matthew Elliott	2640	37.71
74	Rob Quiney	2361	36.89
62*	Aaron Finch	2353	42.01
55	Dean Jones	2122	50.52
63*	Peter Handscomb	1911	39.81
53	Matthew Wade	1696	37.68
84	Andrew McDonald	1589	31.15

List A Bowling Records for Victoria

Matches	Player	Wickets	Average
54	Shane Harwood	88	23.72
62	Mick Lewis	83	28.53
69	Ian Harvey	81	27.40
48	John Hastings	78	29.11
84	Andrew McDonald	72	38.23
54*	Jon Holland	68	33.44
120	Cameron White	57	39.01
39	Clint McKay	51	32.43
26*	James Pattinson	50	24.46
46	Damien Fleming	48	33.00

== See also ==
- Cricket in Victoria
- Cricket Victoria
- Cricket Australia
- List of Victoria first-class cricketers
- Victoria women's cricket team
