= 2006–07 Australian cricket season =

Cricket season review

- 2005–06 ^{.} Australian cricket season ^{.} 2007–08

The 2006–07 Australian cricket season is made up of three domestic competitions for the men; the first-class Pura Cup, the List A Ford Ranger One Day Cup and the Twenty20 competition KFC Twenty20 Big Bash. The women compete in the Women's National Cricket League, although Tasmania does not have a first-class women's team. The season started on 11 October 2006 with a domestic Ford Ranger One Day Cup match between Queensland and Tasmania, and culminated with the World Cup Final between Australia and Sri Lanka on 28 April 2007.

The international season started with the Champions Trophy in October and November, followed by the 5-Test match Ashes series and a single Twenty20 match against England until early January. The English tour was followed by the 2006–07 Commonwealth Bank Series, an ODI triangular series against England and New Zealand which lasted until mid February. Later in the summer, Australia toured New Zealand, playing for the 2006–07 Chappell–Hadlee Trophy, and competed in the World Cup in March and April.

== Roll of honour ==
=== International series ===
- Rose Bowl: Australia Women beat New Zealand Women 5–0 in 5-ODI series.
- Champions Trophy: Australia beat West Indies by eight wickets in the final.
- Ashes: Australia beat England 5–0 in 5-Test Match series.
- Commonwealth Bank Series: Australia finished first in pool table, but lost to England, who finished second in the pools, 2–0 in Best of 3 ODI Finals Series.
- Chappell–Hadlee Trophy: New Zealand won 3–0 in 3 Match ODI Series.
- 2007 Cricket World Cup: Australia beat Sri Lanka in the final, undefeated throughout the tournament.

=== Domestic tournaments ===
- Pura Cup: Tasmanian Tigers defeated New South Wales Blues in Final.
- Ford Ranger One Day Cup: Queensland defeated Victoria in Final.
- KFC Twenty20 Big Bash: Victorian Bushrangers defeated Tasmanian Tigers in Final.
- Women's National Cricket League: New South Wales Breakers defeated Victoria Spirit 2–1 in the three-match final.
- Cricket Australia Cup (2nd XI): New South Wales Second XI finished first in the pool table.

== International tours and tournaments ==
=== Ashes ===
The 2006–07 cricket series between Australia and England for the Ashes was played in Australia between 23 November 2006 and 5 January 2007. The five Test matches were at Brisbane, Adelaide, Perth, Melbourne and Sydney. Australia won the series 5–0, the first whitewash victory in 86 years, and regained the ashes that were held by England after its win in 2005. Australia also won the Twenty20 International.

=== Commonwealth Bank Series ===
Australia was a clear winner in the round robin stage, with 7 wins and only 1 loss, but lost against England in the best-of-3 series final.

=== Chappell–Hadlee Trophy ===
3 ODI matches between Australia and New Zealand to be held in New Zealand.

=== World Cup ===
The premier One Day International tournament was held in the West Indies from 13 March to 28 April. Australia topped their group in the competition, defeating Scotland, the Netherlands and South Africa along the way. They remained undefeated throughout the Super 8 stage of the competition and again topped the group table. They defeated South Africa in the semi-final and went on to complete an unbeaten tournament with victory over Sri Lanka in a rain-affected final.

== Domestic competitions ==
=== Tables ===
Pura Cup
Rk	Team	Pld	W	L	LWF	DWF	DLF	Pts
1	Tasmanian Tigers	10	6	2	0	1	1	38
2	NSW Blues	10	4	2	1	1	2	28
3	Western Warriors	10	3	3	1	3	0	26
4	Victorian Bushrangers	10	4	2	1	0	3	26
5	Queensland Bulls	10	4	4	0	1	1	26
6	Southern Redbacks	10	1	5	1	2	1	12
Source: CricketArchive.com

Ford Ranger Cup
Rk	Team	Pld	W	T	L	NR/A	BP	Pts
1	Victorian Bushrangers	10	7	0	3	0	4	32
2	Queensland Bulls	10	6	0	4	0	2	26
3	Western Warriors	10	5	0	5	0	2	22
4	Southern Redbacks	10	5	0	5	0	1	21
5	Tasmanian Tigers	10	4	0	6	0	1	17
6	NSW Blues	10	3	0	7	0	1	13
Source: CricketArchive.com

KFC Twenty20 Big Bash
Rk	Team	Pld	W	T	L	NR/A	Pts
1	Victorian Bushrangers	4	3	0	0	1	7
2	Tasmanian Tigers	4	2	0	1	1	5
3	Western Warriors	4	2	0	2	0	4
4	Queensland	4	2	0	2	0	4
5	Southern Redbacks	4	2	0	2	0	4
6	NSW Blues	4	0	0	4	0	0
Source: CricketArchive.com

Women's National League
Rk	Team	Pld	W	NR/A	T	L	BP	Pts
1	Victoria Spirit	8	6	0	0	2	4	28
2	NSW Breakers	8	5	0	0	3	5	25
3	Queensland Fire	8	5	0	0	3	3	23
4	Southern Scorpions	8	3	1	0	4	0	14
5	Western Fury	8	0	1	0	7	0	2
Source: CricketArchive.com

For an explanation of the points system for the Pura Cup, please see Pura Cup#Points system.

Legend:

- W: Outright win
- DWF: Draws when first innings won
- DLF: Draws when first innings lost
- LWF: Losses when first innings won
- L: Losses

=== Matches ===
Fixtures during the 2006–07 season
Date	Home team	Away team	Ground	Competition	Result
October
11 October	Queensland Bulls	Tasmanian Tigers	Gabba	FRC	Bulls by 9 wkts
13,14,15,16 October	Queensland Bulls	Tasmanian Tigers	Gabba	Pura	Tigers by 7 wkts
13 October	Western Warriors	Victorian Bushrangers	WACA	FRC	Warriors by 11 runs
15,16,17,18 October	Western Warriors	Victorian Bushrangers	WACA	Pura	Draw
15 October	New South Wales Blues	Southern Redbacks	North Sydney Oval	FRC	Redbacks by 5 wkts (D/L)
16 October	Queensland Fire	New Zealand Women	Peter Burge Oval	Women's OD	NZ by 45 runs
17,18,19,20 October	New South Wales Blues	Southern Redbacks	SCG	Pura	Draw
18 October	Australia Women	New Zealand Women	Allan Border Field	Women's T20	Tied
18 October	Australia	West Indies	Brabourne Stadium (Ind)	CT 1	WI by 10 runs
20 October	Australia Women	New Zealand Women	Allan Border Field	1st Women's ODI	Aus by 1 run
21 October	Australia	England	Sawai Mansingh Stadium (Ind)	CT 2	Aus by 6 wkts
22 October	Australia Women	New Zealand Women	Allan Border Field	2nd Women's ODI	Aus by 1 wkt
22,23,24,25 October	Western Warriors	Tasmanian Tigers	WACA	Pura	Tigers by 6 runs
24 October	Australia Women	New Zealand Women	Allan Border Field	3rd Women's ODI	Aus by 5 runs
25 October	Queensland Bulls	New South Wales Blues	Gabba	FRC	Bulls by 65 runs
26 October	Australia Women	New Zealand Women	Allan Border Field	4th Women's ODI	Aus by 85 runs
27,28,29,30 October	Queensland Bulls	New South Wales Blues	Gabba	Pura	Blues by 74 runs
27,28,29,30 October	Southern Redbacks	Victorian Bushrangers	Adelaide Oval	Pura	Bushrangers by 215 runs
27 October	Western Warriors	Tasmanian Tigers	WACA	FRC	Tigers by 43 runs
28 October	Australia Women	New Zealand Women	Allan Border Field	5th Women's ODI	Aus by 4 wkts
29 October	India	Australia	PCA Stadium (Ind)	CT 3	Aus by 6 wkts
November
1 November	New Zealand	Australia	PCA Stadium (Ind)	CT SF	Aus by 34 runs
3,4,5,6 November	Southern Redbacks	New South Wales Blues	Adelaide Oval	Pura	Blues by 2 wkts
4 November	Tasmanian Tigers	Queensland Bulls	Bellerive Oval	FRC	Tigers by 5 wkts
5 November	West Indies	Australia	Brabourne Stadium (Ind)	CT Final	Aus by 8 wkts (D/L)
8 November	Southern Redbacks	New South Wales Blues	Adelaide Oval	FRC	Blues by 4 wkts
10 November	Prime Minister's XI	England XI	Manuka Oval	Tour	PM's XI by 166 runs
11 November	Southern Scorpions	Western Fury	Centennial Park, Nuriootpa	NCL	Scorpions by 12 runs
12,13,14 November	New South Wales Blues	England XI	SCG	Tour	Draw
11 November	Southern Scorpions	Western Fury	Centennial Park, Nuriootpa	NCL	Abandoned
12,13,14,15 November	Western Warriors	Queensland Bulls	WACA	Pura	Bulls by inns&16 runs
12 November	Victorian Bushrangers	Tasmanian Tigers	MCG	FRC	Bushrangers by 55 runs
14,15,16,17 November	Victorian Bushrangers	Tasmanian Tigers	MCG	Pura	Draw
17,18,19 November	Southern Redbacks	England XI	Adelaide Oval	Tour	Draw
17 November	Western Warriors	Queensland Bulls	WACA	FRC	Warriors by 81 runs
18 November	New South Wales Breakers	Victoria Spirit	Sydney Cricket Ground	NCL	Breakers by 3 wkts
19 November	Tasmanian Tigers	New South Wales Blues	Bellerive Oval	FRC	Blues by 7 wkts
19 November	New South Wales Breakers	Victoria Spirit	Sydney Cricket Ground	NCL	Spirit by 6 wkts
22 November	New South Wales Blues	Western Warriors	SCG	FRC	Blues by 1 run
23,24,25,26,27 November	Australia	England	Gabba	1st Test	Aus by 277 runs
24,25,26,27 November	New South Wales Blues	Western Warriors	SCG	Pura	Draw
24,25,26,27 November	Victorian Bushrangers	Queensland Bulls	MCG	Pura	Bushrangers by 90 runs
29 November	Victorian Bushrangers	Queensland Bulls	MCG	FRC	Bushrangers by 8 runs
December
1,2,3,4,5 December	Australia	England	Adelaide Oval	2nd Test	Aus by 6 wickets
2 December	Queensland Fire	New South Wales Breakers	Allan Border Field	NCL	Fire by 36 runs
3 December	Tasmanian Tigers	Southern Redbacks	NTCA Ground	FRC	Tigers by 8 wickets
3 December	Victorian Bushrangers	Western Warriors	MCG	FRC	Bushrangers by 4 wickets
3 December	Queensland Fire	New South Wales Breakers	Allan Border Field	NCL	Fire by 6 wickets
6,7,8,9 December	Tasmanian Tigers	Southern Redbacks	Bellerive Oval	Pura	Draw
6 December	New South Wales Blues	Queensland Bulls	SCG	FRC	Bulls by 24 runs
8 December	Queensland Bulls	Victorian Bushrangers	Gabba	FRC	Bushrangers by 32 runs
9,10 December	Western Warriors	England XI	WACA	Tour	Draw
10 December	New South Wales Blues	Victorian Bushrangers	Manuka Oval	FRC	Bushrangers by 8 wickets
13 December	Southern Redbacks	Queensland Bulls	Adelaide Oval	FRC	Redbacks by 3 wickets
14,15,16,17,18 December	Australia	England	WACA	3rd Test	Aus by 206 runs
15,16,17,18 December	Southern Redbacks	Queensland Bulls	Adelaide Oval	Pura	Bulls by 280 runs
15,16,17,18 December	Victorian Bushrangers	New South Wales Blues	MCG	Pura	Bushrangers by an inns and 63 runs
16 December	New South Wales Breakers	Western Fury	Hurstville Oval	NCL	Breakers by 6 wickets
16 December	Queensland Fire	Southern Scorpions	Allan Border Field	NCL	Scorpions by 1 run (D/L)
17 December	Tasmanian Tigers	Western Warriors	Bellerive Oval	FRC	Warriors by 9 runs
17 December	New South Wales Breakers	Western Fury	Hurstville Oval	NCL	Breakers by 2 wickets
17 December	Queensland Fire	Southern Scorpions	Allan Border Field	NCL	Scorpions by 7 wickets
19,20,21,22 December	Tasmanian Tigers	Western Warriors	Bellerive Oval	Pura	Warriors by 3 wickets
20 December	Victorian Bushrangers	New South Wales Blues	MCG	FRC	Bushrangers by 9 wickets
23 December	Southern Redbacks	Victorian Bushrangers	Adelaide Oval	FRC	Bushrangers by 29 runs
26,27,28,29,30 December	Australia	England	MCG	4th Test	Aus by an inns and 99 runs
January
1 January	Queensland Bulls	Tasmanian Tigers	Gabba	T20	Bulls by 38 runs
1 January	Southern Redbacks	Victorian Bushrangers	Adelaide Oval	T20	Bushrangers by 34 runs
1 January	Western Warriors	New South Wales Blues	WACA	T20	Warriors by 26 runs
2,3,4,5,6 January	Australia	England	SCG	5th Test	Aus by 10 wickets
4 January	Western Warriors	Southern Redbacks	WACA	T20	Warriors by 55 runs
5 January	Queensland Bulls	New South Wales Blues	Gabba	T20	Bulls by 9 runs
5 January	Tasmanian Tigers	Victorian Bushrangers	Bellerive Oval	T20	Match abandoned
6 January	Western Fury	Victoria Spirit	Aquinas College Memorial Oval	NCL	Spirit by 5 wickets
7 January	New South Wales Blues	Southern Redbacks	No. 1 Sports Ground	T20	Redbacks by 8 runs
7 January	Tasmanian Tigers	Western Warriors	Bellerive Oval	T20	Tigers by 85 runs
7 January	Victorian Bushrangers	Queensland Bulls	MCG	T20	Bushrangers by 88 runs
7 January	Western Fury	Victoria Spirit	Aquinas College Memorial Oval	NCL	Spirit by 5 wickets
9 January	Australia	England	SCG	T20 Int'l	Aus by 77 runs
10 January	New South Wales Blues	Tasmanian Tigers	Telstra Stadium	T20	Tigers by 37 runs
10 January	Southern Redbacks	Queensland Bulls	Adelaide Oval	T20	Redbacks by 19 runs
10 January	Victorian Bushrangers	Western Warriors	MCG	T20	Bushrangers by 5 wickets
12 January	Australia	England	MCG	ODI 1	Aus by 8 wickets
13 January	Victorian Bushrangers	Tasmanian Tigers	MCG	T20 Final	Bushrangers by 10 runs
13 January	Southern Scorpions	New South Wales Breakers	University Oval	NCL	Breakers by 50 runs
13 January	Victoria Spirit	Queensland Fire	Central Reserve	NCL	Spirit by 57 runs
14 January	Australia	New Zealand	Bellerive Oval	ODI 2	Aus by 105 runs
14 January	Southern Scorpions	New South Wales Breakers	University Oval	NCL	Breakers by 8 wickets
14 January	Victoria Spirit	Queensland Fire	Central Reserve	NCL	Spirit by 80 runs
16,17,18,19 January	New South Wales Blues	Victorian Bushrangers	SCG	Pura	Bushrangers by 3 wickets
16 January	England	New Zealand	Bellerive Oval	ODI 3	Eng by 3 wickets
17 January	Western Warriors	Southern Redbacks	WACA	FRC	Warriors by 1 wicket
19,20,21,22 January	Tasmanian Tigers	Queensland Bulls	Bellerive Oval	Pura	Tigers by 8 wickets
19,20,21,22 January	Western Warriors	Southern Redbacks	WACA	Pura	Warriors by an inns and 55 runs
19 January	Australia	England	Gabba	ODI 4	Aus by 4 wickets
21 January	Australia	New Zealand	SCG	ODI 5	Aus by 2 wickets
23 January	England	New Zealand	Adelaide Oval	ODI 6	NZ by 90 runs
24 January	New South Wales Blues	Tasmanian Tigers	Telstra Stadium	FRC	Tigers by 3 wickets
25 January	Queensland Bulls	Western Warriors	Gabba	FRC	Bulls by 2 runs (D/L)
26,27,28,29 January	Victorian Bushrangers	Southern Redbacks	MCG	Pura	Bushrangers by 3 wickets
26 January	Australia	England	Adelaide Oval	ODI 7	Aus by 9 wickets
26 January	Victoria Spirit	New South Wales Breakers	Central Reserve	NCL Final 1	Breakers by 1 wicket
27 January	Victoria Spirit	New South Wales Breakers	Central Reserve	NCL Final 2	Spirit by 8 wickets
28 January	Victoria Spirit	New South Wales Breakers	Central Reserve	NCL Final 3	Breakers by 3 wickets
27,28,29,30 January	New South Wales Blues	Tasmanian Tigers	SCG	Pura	Blues by an inns and 165 runs
28,29,30,31 January	Queensland Bulls	Western Warriors	Gabba	Pura	Warriors by an inns and 45 runs
28 January	Australia	New Zealand	WACA	ODI 8	Aus by 8 runs
30 January	England	New Zealand	WACA	ODI 9	NZ by 58 runs
31 January	Victorian Bushrangers	Southern Redbacks	MCG	FRC	Bushrangers by 7 wickets
February
2 February	Australia	England	SCG	ODI 10	Eng by 92 runs
3 February	Southern Redbacks	Western Warriors	Adelaide Oval	FRC	Redbacks by 3 wickets
4 February	Australia	New Zealand	MCG	ODI 11	Aus by 5 wickets
6 February	England	New Zealand	Gabba	ODI 12	Eng by 14 runs
7 February	Western Warriors	New South Wales Blues	WACA	FRC	Warriors by 8 wickets
9,10,11,12 February	Queensland Bulls	Southern Redbacks	Gabba	Pura	Draw
9,10,11,12 February	Western Warriors	New South Wales Blues	WACA	Pura	Blues by 188 runs
9 February	Australia	England	MCG	ODI Final 1	Eng by 4 wickets
11 February	Australia	England	SCG	ODI Final 2	Eng by 34 runs (D/L)
12,13,14,15 February	Tasmanian Tigers	Victorian Bushrangers	Bellerive Oval	Pura	Tigers by 3 wickets
13 February	Australia	England	Adelaide Oval	ODI Final 3	Match cancelled
14 February	Queensland Bulls	Southern Redbacks	Gabba	FRC	Redbacks by 7 wickets
16 February	New Zealand	Australia	Westpac Stadium (NZ)	1st ODI	NZ by 10 wickets
17 February	Tasmanian Tigers	Victorian Bushrangers	Bellerive Oval	FRC	Bushrangers by 143 runs
18 February	New Zealand	Australia	Eden Park (NZ)	2nd ODI	NZ by 5 wickets
20 February	New Zealand	Australia	Seddon Park (NZ)	3rd ODI	NZ by 1 wicket
21 February	Southern Redbacks	Tasmanian Tigers	Adelaide Oval	FRC	Redbacks by 3 wickets
25 February	Victorian Bushrangers	Queensland Bulls	MCG	KRC Final	Bulls by 21 runs
March
1,2,3,4 March	New South Wales Blues	Queensland Bulls	SCG	Pura	Draw
1,2,3,4 March	Southern Redbacks	Tasmanian Tigers	Adelaide Oval	Pura	Tigers by 8 wickets
1,2,3,4 March	Victorian Bushrangers	Western Warriors	MCG	Pura	Draw
8,9,10,11 March	Queensland Bulls	Victorian Bushrangers	Gabba	Pura	Bulls by 101 runs
8,9,10,11 March	Southern Redbacks	Western Warriors	Adelaide Oval	Pura	Redbacks by 61 runs
8,9,10,11 March	Tasmanian Tigers	New South Wales Blues	Bellerive Oval	Pura	Tigers by 7 wickets
14 March	Australia	Scotland	Warner Park Stadium (St Kitts)	WC A 1	Aus by 203 runs
18 March	Australia	Netherlands	Warner Park Stadium (St Kitts)	WC A 2	Aus by 229 runs
19,20,21,22,23,24 March	Tasmanian Tigers	New South Wales Blues	Bellerive Oval	Pura Final	Tigers by 421 runs
24 March	Australia	South Africa	Warner Park Stadium (St Kitts)	WC A 3	Aus by 83 runs
27,28 March	Australia	West Indies	Sir Vivian Richards Stadium (Antigua)	WC S8 1	Aus by 103 runs
31 March	Australia	Bangladesh	Sir Vivian Richards Stadium (Antigua)	WC S8 2	Aus by 10 wickets
8 April	Australia	England	Sir Vivian Richards Stadium (Antigua)	WC S8 3	Aus by 7 wickets
13 April	Australia	Ireland	Kensington Oval (Barbados)	WC S8 4	Aus by 9 wickets
16 April	Australia	Sri Lanka	Queen's Park (Grenada)	WC S8 5	Aus by 7 wickets
20 April	Australia	New Zealand	Queen's Park (Grenada)	WC S8 6	Aus by 215 runs
25 April	Australia	South Africa	Beausejour Stadium (St Lucia)	WC SF	Aus by 7 wickets
28 April	Australia	Sri Lanka	Kensington Oval (Barbados)	WC Final	Aus by 53 runs (D/L)

=== Squads ===
VICTORIA

Cricket Australia Contracts

- Brad Hodge
- Shane Warne

State Contracts

- Jason Arnberger
- Rob Cassell
- Adam Crosthwaite
- Gerard Denton
- Shane Harwood
- David Hussey
- Nick Jewell
- Michael Klinger
- Brad Knowles
- Mick Lewis
- Lloyd Mash
- Andrew McDonald
- Jonathan Moss
- Dirk Nannes
- Peter Siddle
- Cameron White
- Allan Wise

Rookie Contracts

- Grant Baldwin
- Aiden Blizzard
- Aaron Finch
- Matthew Gale
- Jon Holland
- Peter Nevill

SOUTH AUSTRALIA

Cricket Australia Contracts

- Dan Cullen
- Jason Gillespie
- Shaun Tait

State Contracts

- Nathan Adcock
- Cullen Bailey
- Greg Blewett
- Cameron Borgas
- Ben Cameron
- Mark Cleary
- Mark Cosgrove
- Shane Deitz
- Matthew Elliott
- Callum Ferguson
- Daniel Harris
- Ryan Harris
- Trent Kelly
- Darren Lehmann
- Graham Manou
- Gary Putland
- Paul Rofe

Rookie Contracts

- Lachlan Oswald-Jacobs
- Tom Plant
- Simon Roberts
- Chadd Sayers
- Ken Skewes

NEW SOUTH WALES

Cricket Australia Contracts

- Nathan Bracken
- Stuart Clark
- Michael Clarke
- Brad Haddin
- Phil Jaques
- Simon Katich
- Brett Lee
- Glenn McGrath
- Stuart MacGill

State Contracts

- Aaron Bird
- Doug Bollinger
- Mark Cameron
- Beau Casson
- Ed Cowan
- Scott Coyte
- Murray Creed
- Nathan Hauritz
- Moises Henriques
- Jason Krejza
- Grant Lambert
- Tim Lang
- Greg Mail
- Matthew Nicholson
- Aaron O'Brien
- James Packman
- Grant Roden
- Craig Simmons
- Daniel Smith
- Dominic Thornely

Rookie Contracts

- Tom Cooper
- Peter Forrest
- John Hastings
- Usman Khawaja
- Stephen O'Keefe
- Martin Paskal
- David Warner

WESTERN AUSTRALIA

Cricket Australia Contracts

- Adam Gilchrist
- Brad Hogg
- Mike Hussey
- Justin Langer
- Damien Martyn

State Contracts

- Dave Bandy
- Brett Dorey
- Ben Edmondson
- Sean Ervine
- Shawn Gillies
- Aaron Heal
- Clint Heron
- Matthew Inness
- Andrew James
- Tim MacDonald
- Steve Magoffin
- Shaun Marsh
- Scott Meuleman
- Marcus North
- Chris Rogers
- Luke Ronchi
- Adam Voges
- Darren Wates
- Peter Worthington

Rookie Contracts

- Arron Crawford
- Nathan Coulter-Nile
- Liam Davis
- Theo Doropoulos
- Craig King
- Josh Mangan
- Luke Pomersbach

QUEENSLAND

Cricket Australia Contracts

- Matthew Hayden
- Mitchell Johnson
- Michael Kasprowicz
- Andrew Symonds
- Shane Watson

State Contracts

- Andy Bichel
- Ryan Broad
- Daniel Doran
- Chris Hartley
- James Hopes
- Shane Jurgensen
- Nick Kruger
- Martin Love
- Jimmy Maher
- Brendan Nash
- Ashley Noffke
- Clinton Perren
- Craig Philipson
- Nathan Rimmington
- Chris Simpson
- Lachlan Stevens
- Grant Sullivan

Rookie Contracts

- Murray Bragg
- Ben Cutting
- Ryan Le Loux
- Nathan Reardon

TASMANIA

Cricket Australia Contract

- Ricky Ponting

State Contracts

- George Bailey
- Michael Bevan
- Travis Birt
- Luke Butterworth
- Sean Clingeleffer
- David Dawson
- Michael Dighton
- Michael Di Venuto
- Xavier Doherty
- Andrew Downton
- Brendan Drew
- Brett Geeves
- Adam Griffith
- Ben Hilfenhaus
- Dan Marsh
- Tim Paine
- Damien Wright

Rookie Contracts

- Dane Anderson
- Alex Doolan
- Chris Duval
- Jason Shelton
- Matthew Wade
- Jonathan Wells

Additional training squad members

- Nick Grainger
- Scott Kremerskothen
- Rhett Lockyer
- Darren McNees
- Adam Polkinghorne
- Jade Selby
- Luke Swards
- Nathan Wegman
