= 2005–06 Australian cricket season =

- Australian cricket season ^{.} 2006–07

The 2005–06 Australian cricket season took place from October 2005 to March 2006.

== Honours ==
- Championship – Queensland
- Limited Overs KO Cup – New South Wales

== Events ==
The 2005–06 Australian cricket season began on 2005-10-05 with the first official ICC Super Series match, and the home season lasted until 2006-03-27 when the Pura Cup final concluded. The national team are, however, playing away matches until 2006-04-28. Australia played six home Tests during this season – three against West Indies and three against South Africa – and also hosted the three-team VB Series, between Australia, South Africa and Sri Lanka. The team also toured New Zealand for One Day Internationals in December, played five ODIs and three Tests in South Africa in February and March, and visited Bangladesh for the first time in April. Also, the season included a new domestic competition, for the first time in 36 seasons – a Twenty20 tournament called the Twenty20 Big Bash was held in January 2006, with two groups of three teams and the group winners proceeding to the final.

Australia won both their home Test series in November and December, winning the Frank Worrell Trophy by virtue of a 3–0 whitewash of the West Indies before defeating South Africa 2–0. Meanwhile, in domestic cricket, New South Wales Blues assumed the ascendancy in both competitions, followed by the Victorian Bushrangers; at the beginning of the New Year, the Blues were four points ahead of the Bushrangers in the Pura Cup, and six points ahead in the ING Cup. The Blues beat the Bushrangers in a top-of-the-table battle in the ING Cup on 2 January, leaving the Bushrangers eleven points adrift in second place, but the Bushrangers came back later in the month with three unbeaten matches against the Blues in the space of a week; a win in the ING, was followed up with a draw with first-innings points in the Pura and finally a win in the Twenty20 Big Bash final.

The Blues only won two matches from then on, falling all the way to last place in the Pura Cup, but one of the two ING Cup wins was a one-wicket win in the final against the Southern Redbacks, which secured them one title for this season as well. Australia came from one match down in the three-match final of the VB Series to beat Sri Lanka 2–1, and shortly afterwards began their winter tour of South Africa. South Africa won the Twenty20 International and the first two One-day Internationals, but Australia came back to 2–2, before the fifth match where the record for highest team total was broken twice. South Africa won that, but were brought down in the Tests, where Australia won the first and declared in the second.

The Pura Cup was rounded off in March; Queensland Bulls qualified for their eighth successive final with a match to spare, while the Bushrangers and the Warriors fought for the last spot at the Junction Oval. The Bushrangers successively chased 360 in that game to book their ticket for Brisbane and the final, where they conceded 900 runs in the first innings to lose by an innings and 354 runs.

== Domestic competition tables ==
Pura Cup
Pos	Team	Pld	W	DWF	DLF	LWF	L	Pts
1	Queensland Bulls	10	5	2	1	0	2	34
2	Victoria Bushrangers	10	4	2	0	1	3	30
3	Southern Redbacks	10	4	1	2	0	3	26
4	Tasmanian Tigers	10	4	0	2	1	3	26
5	Western Warriors	10	3	1	2	0	4	24
6	NSW Blues	10	3	1	2	0	4	20

For an explanation of the points system, please see Pura Cup#Points system

Legend:

- W: Outright win
- DWF: Draws when first innings won
- DLF: Draws when first innings lost
- LWF: Losses when first innings won
- L: Losses

ING Cup
Pos	Team	Pld	W	NR/A	T	L	BP	Pts
1	Southern Redbacks	10	6	0	1	3	3	29
2	NSW Blues	10	6	1	0	2	3	25
3	Victoria Bushrangers	10	5	0	0	5	3	23
4	Western Warriors	10	5	0	0	5	2	22
5	Tasmanian Tigers	10	3	1	1	5	1	17
6	Queensland Bulls	10	3	0	0	7	0	12

For an explanation of the points system, please see Ing Cup's points system

Legend:

- W: Win
- NR/A: No result or Abandoned
- L: Loss
- BP: Bonus points

Women's National League
Pos	Team	Pld	W	NR	L	BP	Pts
1	NSW Breakers	8	7	0	1	5	33
2	Queensland Fire	8	5	0	3	3	23
3	Southern Scorpions	8	5	0	3	1	21
4	Victoria Spirit	8	2	0	6	1	9
5	Western Fury	8	1	0	7	0	4

The same points system is used as in the men's ING Cup.

Legend:

- W: Win
- NR: No result
- L: Loss
- BP: Bonus points

== Roll of honour ==
Test series:

- ICC Super Series Test match: Australia beat ICC World XI by 210 runs
- Frank Worrell Trophy: Australia beat the West Indies 3–0 over three Tests to retain the trophy for the sixth time running
- South Africans in Australia: Australia beat South Africa 2–0 in three Tests
- Australians in South Africa: Australia beat South Africa 3–0 in three Tests
- Australians in Bangladesh: Australia beat Bangladesh 2–0 in two Tests in April 2006

ODI series:

- Super Series: Australia beat the ICC World XI 3–0
- Chappell–Hadlee Trophy (in New Zealand): Australia beat New Zealand 2–1
- VB Series: Australia beat Sri Lanka 2–1 in the final series. South Africa finished third
- Australians in South Africa: Australia lost 2–3 to South Africa
- Australians in Bangladesh: A series of three ODIs in April 2006

Twenty20 International:

- Australia won the one-off Twenty20 International at home to South Africa
- Australia lost the one-off Twenty20 International in South Africa

Pura Cup:

- Queensland Bulls beat Victorian Bushrangers in the final and won the Pura Cup

ING Cup:

- New South Wales Blues beat Southern Redbacks in the final and won the ING Cup

KFC Twenty20 Big Bash:

- Victorian Bushrangers beat New South Wales Blues in the final and won the KFC Twenty20 Big Bash

Women's Test:

- India women in Australia: Australia beat India in the only Test by an innings and four runs

Women's ODIs:

- India women in Australia: Australia beat India 3–0

Women's National League:

- New South Wales Breakers beat Queensland Fire 2–1 in the finals to win the National League.

== October ==
=== Super Series ODIs ===
The first official match of the season was held on 5 October at the Telstra Dome between the ICC World XI and Australia, although there had been a one-day friendly match between the World XI and Victoria which did not have List A status three days earlier, and the Cricket Australia Cup begun on 26 September. The first ODI was won by Australia, who bowled the World XI out for 162 to win the first match by 93 runs, and on the second ground in the second ODI they batted to 328 for 4 on their way to a 55-run win and securing a series victory. The final, dead-rubber match was also played at the Telstra Dome, and once again Australia batted first, making 293 for 5 before bowling the World XI out for 137.

- First ODI, 5 October: Australia beat ICC World XI by 93 runs
- Second ODI, 7 October: Australia beat ICC World XI by 55 runs
- Third ODI, 9 October: Australia beat ICC World XI by 146 runs to win the series 3–0

=== Supertest ===
The domestic competitions began on 14 October, with Queensland Bulls losing the first game as they posted 99 in reply to the NSW Blues' total of 243 for 7 in the one-day ING Cup, at the same day as the six-day Supertest between Australia and the World XI began at the SCG. Australia took care of the Supertest as well – after making their way to 260 for 4 due to 111 from Matthew Hayden, Adam Gilchrist continued with 94 as Australia posted 345. The Aussies then dismissed six men in single figures, as the World XI were bowled out for 190 – Virender Sehwag making 76, while spinners Shane Warne and Stuart MacGill shared seven wickets – but Hayden and Ricky Ponting added 122 for the second wicket, and though Australia lost their last eight wickets for 47 runs, the World XI were set a target of 355 to win. Five World batsmen were then dismissed for ducks, MacGill took five for 43, and Australia completed a whitewash of the World XI with their 210-run win.

- Supertest, 14 – 17 October: Australia beat ICC World XI by 210 runs to win series 1–0
- ING Cup, 14 October: New South Wales Blues (6pts) beat Queensland Bulls (0pts) by 144 runs

=== Pura Cup begins, and first full ING round ===
On 17 October, the Pura Cup began, with the Bulls taking on the Tasmanian Tigers. Tasmania were effectively 17 for 7 in the second innings when rain intervened, ending the match in a draw. A day later, Victorian Bushrangers completed a four-wicket victory at the WACA Ground to go top of the Pura Cup table. The week-end from 22 to 23 October saw a full round of ING Cup games, the Blues beating the Southern Redbacks to go top of the table, while the Bulls and the Western Warriors also chased down targets to record wins.

- Pura Cup, 17 – 20 October: Queensland Bulls (2pts) drew with Tasmanian Tigers (0pts)
- Pura Cup, 18 – 21 October: Victorian Bushrangers (6pts) beat Western Warriors (0pts) by four wickets
- ING Cup, 22 October: Queensland Bulls (4pts) beat Tasmanian Tigers (0pts) by two wickets
- ING Cup, 23 October: New South Wales Blues (4pts) beat Southern Redbacks (0pts) by three wickets
- ING Cup, 23 October: Western Warriors (4pts) beat Victorian Bushrangers (0pts) by five wickets

=== Last week of October ===
One Pura Cup game was played in the last week of October, the Blues facing the Redbacks at the Sydney Cricket Ground, and New South Wales prevailed for their fourth win of the season. They declared twice – in the first innings at 515 for 9, in the second at 187 for 2 – and took the 20 required wickets to win by 187 runs. The West Indies also started their tour with a drawn first-class match against the Bulls, where Marlon Samuels hit a career-best 257 before taking five for 87 in the second innings. Queensland led by 89 with one wicket in hand when the match ended.

The final matches of October saw the Bushrangers face the Warriors for the third time of the month, this time for an ING Cup clash at the Junction Oval in Melbourne, and the Bushrangers took advantage of home soil to win by eight wickets to go second in the table behind the Blues, whose one-day match with the Tigers was rained off.

- Pura Cup, 25 – 28 October: New South Wales Blues (6pts) beat Southern Redbacks (0pts) by 187 runs
- Tour match, 27 – 29 October: Queensland drew with the West Indians
- ING Cup, 29 October: Victoria Bushrangers (5pts) beat Western Warriors (0pts) by eight wickets
- ING Cup, 30 October: New South Wales Blues (2pts) v Tasmanian Tigers (2pts); match abandoned without a ball bowled

== November ==
=== First Test v WI ===
The first match in November was the Test match between Australia and the West Indies at the Brisbane Cricket Ground, which began on 3 November, and after a hundred in each innings from Australian captain Ricky Ponting, and five-wicket-hauls from Shane Warne (first innings) and Brett Lee (second innings), Australia hauled home a 379-run win. While the Test was on, the Redbacks recorded their first win of the season, beating the Bulls in the ING Cup after an unbeaten 109 from Mark Cosgrove, while the Blues' total of 309 for 8 was enough to beat the Warriors and widen the top-of-the-table in the other match on 4 November. The women's National Cricket League began the following day, with Southern Scorpions overcoming Queensland Fire, though the Scorpions' captain and number three batter, Karen Rolton, was dismissed for a golden duck. The following day, Rolton made 151 off 144 balls in chase of 254 in 50 overs, but the Scorpions still finished on 247 for 8 after Kirsten Pike took three wickets for the Fire.

- First Test, 3 – 6 November: Australia beat West Indies by 379 runs
- ING Cup, 4 November: New South Wales Blues (4pts) beat Western Warriors (0pts) by 25 runs
- ING Cup, 4 November: Southern Redbacks (4pts) beat Queensland Bulls (0pts) by six wickets
- Women's National League, 5 November: Southern Scorpions (4pts) beat Queensland Fire (0pts) by five wickets
- Women's National League, 6 November: Queensland Fire (4pts) beat Southern Scorpions (0pts) by seven runs

=== Domestic matches, first half of November ===
The Tigers and the Bushrangers also began a Pura Cup game on 4 November – the Tigers took a 180-run lead on first innings and forced the Bushrangers to follow on, but the Bushrangers turned the game around to win by 109 runs and went first in the Pura Cup table. NSW regained the Pura Cup ascendancy two days later, however, completing a victory at the Warriors' ground as they chased 88 to win by eight wickets despite a second-innings 161 from Western Australia's Chris Rogers. On the same day, the Bulls completed their second draw of the season against the Redbacks, in a match where nearly two days' play were lost to rain. Two days later, on 11 November, Victorian Bushrangers began a three-day tour match with the West Indies – it was drawn, as each team only completed one of two innings, with Victoria making 571 in their 122.4 overs. The West Indies were bowled out for 302 in the reply. The teams agreed to play a Twenty20 match at the end of the match, which Victoria won in the last over, despite six sixes and a 40-ball 81 from West Indian batsman Dwayne Smith.

In the ING Cup, the Warriors recorded a win to go second in the table, while the Bulls followed in third after they became the first team to beat the Blues in the season – despite 152 not out from Blues' opener Phil Jaques, the Bulls had Clinton Perren and Matthew Hayden respond with a 113-run second wicket stand on their way to a three-wicket win. The Warriors went straight from ING Cup success to Pura Cup disappointment – their third loss in a row in that competition came at the Redbacks, who won by 129 runs after Darren Lehmann hit a career-best 301 not out to send the Redbacks to a first-innings total of 552 for 7 declared. The Redbacks did not enforce the follow on after bowling them out 271 behind, but after setting a target of 411 in three and a half sessions, Dan Cullen took five for 92 to help bowl out the Warriors for a total of 271. Warriors wicket-keeper Ryan Campbell hit 186 runs in two innings in the match.

- Pura Cup, 4 – 7 November: Victoria Bushrangers (6pts) beat Tasmanian Tigers (2pts) by 109 runs
- Pura Cup, 6 – 9 November: New South Wales Bulls (6pts) beat Western Warriors (0pts) by eight wickets
- Pura Cup, 6 – 9 November: Queensland Bulls (2pts) drew with Southern Redbacks (0pts)
- Tour match, 11 – 13 November: Victoria drew with the West Indians
- Tour match, Twenty20, 13 November: Victoria beat the West Indians by four wickets
- ING Cup, 12 November: Western Warriors (5pts) beat Southern Redbacks (0pts) by six wickets
- ING Cup, 13 November: Queensland Bulls (4pts) beat New South Wales Blues (0pts) by three wickets
- Pura Cup, 14 – 17 November: Southern Redbacks (4pts) beat Western Warriors (0pts) by 129 runs

=== Second Test ===
The second Test began on 17 November, and this time the West Indies lasted all five days – one more than in Brisbane – despite falling for 149 in two sessions after choosing to bat. Matthew Hayden and Mike Hussey put on 231 for the first wicket, as Australia made 406, and the West Indies were 140 for 6 midway through the morning session on day four. Then Dwayne Bravo hit his highest Test score thus far with 113, and with the help of wicket-keeper Denesh Ramdin who made a career-best 71 and shared a 182-run stand with Bravo, he helped the West Indies to set a target of 78. Australia lost one wicket in the chase, that of Hayden, who was caught for 46 in the over before Hussey ended the match.

- Second Test, 17 – 21 November: Australia beat West Indies by nine wickets

=== Pura Cup Week Four ===
In the Pura Cup, the Blues took care of the Tigers inside three days, posting 522 for 9 declared before Stuart Clark took six wickets as Tasmania were bowled out for 294 and 138 in an innings-and-90-run defeat. Queensland also got their first win of the season, rain staying away from the 'Gabba as Queensland recovered from a 28-run first-innings deficit against the Bushrangers to make 405 in the second innings, before Michael Kasprowicz got the best first-class bowling figures in Australia all season with eight for 44. Victoria were bowled out for 155, despite number three Lloyd Mash making 83 in his second first-class match. The weekend also saw four matches in the women's National League, the Southern Scorpions and the Victoria Spirit winning one match each, while the NSW Breakers started the season unbeaten with two wins over Western Fury.

- Pura Cup, 18 – 20 November: New South Wales Blues (6pts) beat Tasmanian Tigers (0pts) by an innings and 90 runs
- Pura Cup, 18 – 21 November: Queensland Bulls (6pts) beat Victorian Bushrangers (2pts) by 225 runs
- Women's National League, 19 November: Southern Scorpions (4pts) beat Victoria Spirit (0pts) by one wicket
- Women's National League, 19 November: New South Wales Breakers (4pts) beat Western Fury (0pts) by seven wickets
- Women's National League, 20 November: Victoria Spirit (5pts) beat Southern Scorpions (0pts) by four wickets
- Women's National League, 20 November: New South Wales Breakers (5pts) beat Western Fury (0pts) by 118 runs

=== Third Test ===
The last ING Cup match of the month was on 25 November between the Warriors and the Tigers at the WACA Ground, a match that was decided on the last ball – the Warriors batted to 262 for 7 after 72 from Chris Rogers and 66 from Shaun Marsh, but Michael Di Venuto hit a hundred for the Tigers, before three wickets fell for 21 to leave the Tigers at 255 for 7 with an over to spare. After two runs came off the first four deliveries, Scott Kremerskothen hit Steve Magoffin for four off the penultimate ball before taking two off the last to win the game. On the same day, West Indies batsman Brian Lara hit 202 unbeaten runs in the third and final Test to become the second batsman to pass 11,000 Test runs, and he broke Allan Border's Test record of most runs on the following day, making 226 out of the West Indies total of 405. However, Australia replied with 428 after Hussey hit another century, and despite the efforts of Bravo (six for 84 in the first innings, 64 with the bat in the second), West Indies lost by seven wickets after Warne took six wickets in the West Indies' second innings and Hayden hit an unbeaten 87 to take Australia to the target and the whitewash.

- Third Test, 25 – 29 November: Australia beat West Indies by seven wickets to win the series 3–0 and win the Frank Worrell Trophy
- ING Cup, 25 November: Tasmanian Tigers (4pts) beat Western Warriors (0pts) by three wickets

=== Pura Cup Week Five ===
Michael Clarke had been dropped from the Australian team, but responded to the selectors with 201 not out for the NSW Blues in a rain-hit game with the Bulls at the SCG, which ended in a draw, the Bulls' third of the season. The Redbacks also had the help of a dropped Test player as they climbed to third place – Jason Gillespie took seven wickets in the first innings, and nine for 125 in total, before half-centuries from Matthew Elliott and Callum Ferguson gave the Redbacks a win in the final session. The last match of the month was in the Pura Cup, where the Warriors batted first against the Tigers and took a 171-run first-innings lead to take their first points of the season, before being bundled out for 176 in the second innings and losing by two wickets after George Bailey made a century and the Tigers made it to eight for 348 – their highest total thus far in the season.

- Pura Cup, 26 – 29 November: New South Wales Blues (2pts) drew with Queensland Bulls (0pts)
- Pura Cup, 26 – 29 November: Southern Redbacks (6pts) beat Victorian Bushrangers (0pts) by seven wickets
- Pura Cup, 27 – 30 November: Tasmanian Tigers (6pts) beat Western Warriors (2pts) by two wickets

== December ==
=== Chappell–Hadlee Trophy ===
Australia's national team travelled to New Zealand for a one-week, three-match ODI series called the Chappell-Hadlee Trophy – at the first match in Auckland, Australia made eight for 252 after Ricky Ponting and Simon Katich hit half-centuries, and though the opposing captain Daniel Vettori took two wickets and let away 29 runs in ten overs (the third-most economical bowler in the match), it was Australian bowler Brett Lee who became Man of the Match due to his bowling. He bowled four maidens with the new ball, taking three wickets for five runs including both the Marshall twins, Hamish and James, and ended with the bowling analysis of 6–4–5–3. Stuart Clark, playing in his second One-day International, got three for 19, and New Zealand were bowled out for 105 in a 147-run loss.

The first match of December was an ING Cup match between the Redbacks and the Bushrangers. The Bushrangers could go second in the table with a win, but after rain delayed the start for 90 minutes and shortened both teams' innings to 41 overs, spinners Dan Cullen and Darren Lehmann shared seven wickets and limited the Bushrangers to a total of eight for 204 in their rain-shortened innings. Michael Klinger notched up 103, the Bushrangers' first one-day century of the season, but Greg Blewett and Mark Cosgrove shared an unbeaten 143-run partnership for the third wicket to guide the Redbacks home after two wickets from Peter Siddle had seen the Redbacks to two for 62. In the women's league, the Breakers extended their run of victories to four, while one bonus point and a win in the first match against Western Fury was enough to see Victoria Spirit into the second place, despite losing the second match.

- First One-day International, 3 December: Australia beat New Zealand by 147 runs
- ING Cup, 3 December: Southern Redbacks (4pts) beat Victorian Bushrangers (0pts) by seven wickets
- Women's National League, 3 December: New South Wales Breakers (5pts) beat Queensland Fire (0pts) by seven wickets
- Women's National League, 3 December: Victoria Spirit (5pts) beat Western Fury (0pts) by 81 runs
- Women's National League, 4 December: New South Wales Breakers (5pts) beat Queensland Fire (0pts) by 78 runs
- Women's National League, 4 December: Western Fury (4pts) beat Victoria Spirit (0pts) by three wickets

=== South Africans arrive ===
South Africa began their tour of Australia on 5 December, 11 days before the first Test match, with a three-day tour match against Western Australia. After a century from Adam Voges, the Warriors declared on eight for 391, before bowling out South Africa from 179 and 164 in their two innings to take the win by an innings and 48 runs. Meanwhile, the Blues travelled to Victoria and the Bushrangers for a Pura Cup match scheduled to start on 6 December, but heavy rain in Melbourne saw the first day's play called off. After play started at 2pm on the second day, Phil Jaques hit 124 not out as the Blues closed on two for 217, but after he was dismissed no Blues batsman made 25, and the Blues lost their last eight wickets for 80, Allen Wise taking a career-best six for 89 along the way. The Bushrangers then had four top-order batsmen hit half-centuries, and Test bowler MacGill bowled 22 wicketless overs as the Bushrangers racked up a first-innings lead, making 462. Six batsmen were then dismissed for sub-15 scores, with Shane Harwood notching up four scalps and Wise two, but Brad Haddin hung on to make 71 not out, and Matt Nicholson batted with him for 90 minutes for 9 to see the Blues close on seven for 139 and draw the game.

- Tour match, 5 – 7 December: Western Australia beat the South Africans by an innings and 48 runs
- Pura Cup, 6 – 9 December: Victorian Bushrangers (2pts) drew with New South Wales Blues (0pts)

=== End of New Zealand tour ===
The final two ODIs of the Chappell–Hadlee Trophy saw four team scores above 320, and a record chase in the final dead rubber match. The second match between Australia and New Zealand saw Australia bat first, and after Australia had been four for 101 after Simon Katich was run out, an Australian record partnership between Michael Clarke and Andrew Symonds followed. The pair who added 220 for the fifth wicket, Symonds hitting eight sixes and twelve fours on his way to a record score in ODIs between the two sides. His 156 was the third-highest by an Australian against any opponent, and the stand with Clarke paved the way for a total of 322 for 5. New Zealand needed 53 from the last 33 balls, and New Zealand still needed 24 off the final two overs. However, Brett Lee's penultimate over yielded 18 runs, as Brett Lee bowled a no-ball and a wide, and another ball was adjudged a no-ball as Australia had too few players inside the circle. Mick Lewis was left to bowl the last over, and with six runs required the last two batsmen were run out, leaving New Zealand on 320 – two runs short of victory. Australia thus won the Chappell–Hadlee Trophy with a match to spare.

A warm-up match without List A status saw South Africa beat the Cricket Australia Chairman's XI at Lilac Hill, with medium pacer Garnett Kruger taking four wickets and Herschelle Gibbs hitting an unbeaten 91 in the chase. A day later, in the last match of the Chappell–Hadlee Trophy, Mitchell Johnson was given his debut as Super Sub, coming in after Australia had batted to seven for 331 with four half-centuries. Johnson bowled nine overs for 64, without taking a wicket, and Scott Styris hit a hundred as New Zealand chased down the target for the highest successful run chase in ODI cricket thus far. Meanwhile, in the ING Cup, the Redbacks went second after beating the Tigers, former Test bowler Jason Gillespie making up for his wicketless match by taking part in an unbeaten eight-wicket stand of 34 to see the Redbacks to the target, and in the final match of the week the Bushrangers, including Shane Warne, beat the Bulls after Grant Lindsay had taken three wickets and the Bulls were bowled out for 185, Liam Buchanan and David Hussey hit half-centuries and the Bushrangers won by five wickets, taking a bonus point.

- Second ODI, 7 December: Australia beat New Zealand by two runs
- Tour match, 9 December: South Africans beat Cricket Australia Chairman's XI by eight wickets
- Third ODI, 10 December: New Zealand beat Australia by two wickets; Australia win the series 2–1 and become the first winners of the Chappell–Hadlee Trophy
- ING Cup, 10 December: Southern Redbacks (4pts) beat Tasmanian Tigers (0pts) by three wickets
- ING Cup, 11 December: Victorian Bushrangers (5pts) beat Queensland Bulls (0pts) by six wickets

=== Third week of December ===
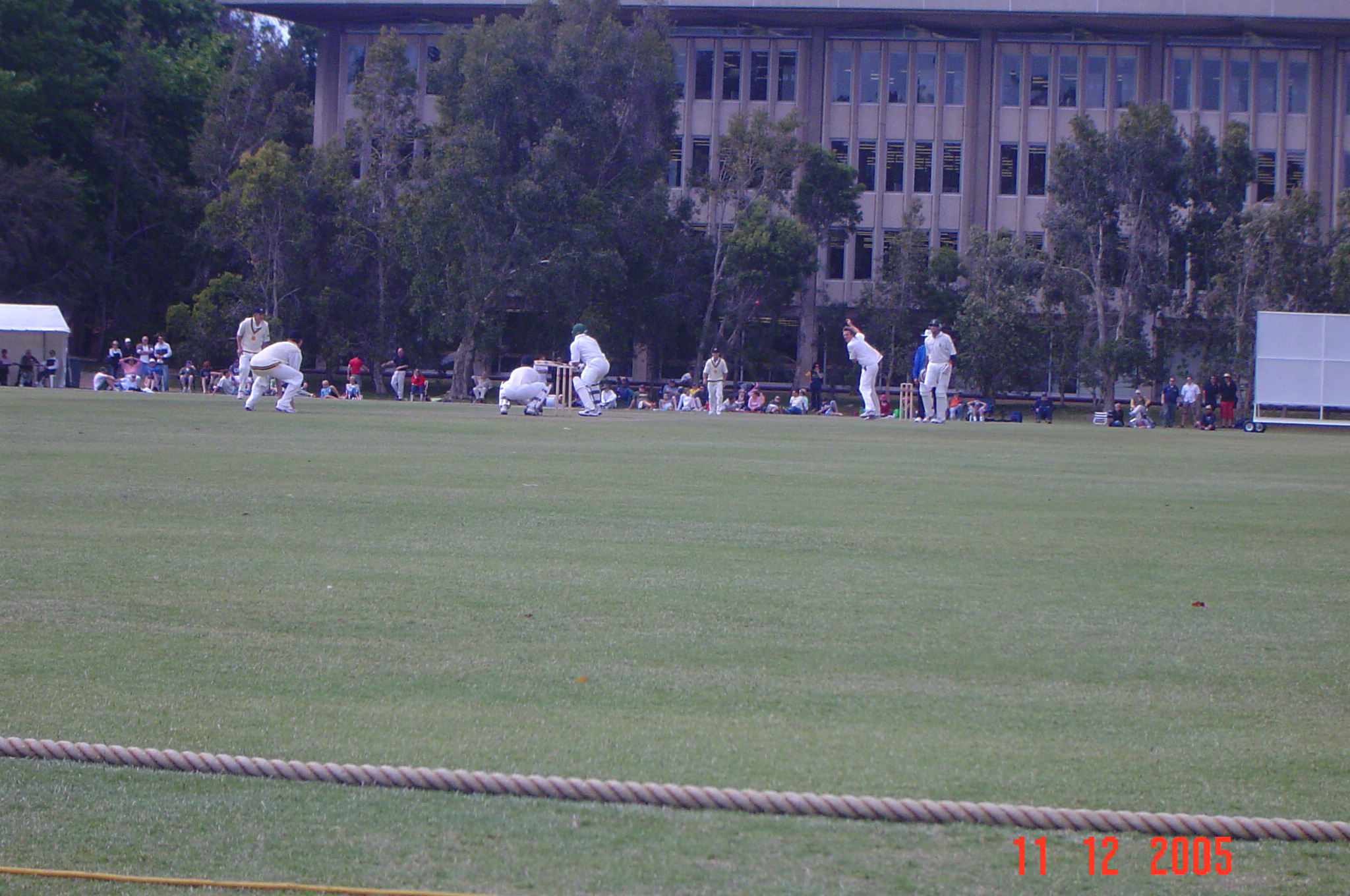
The South Africans taking on Western Australia at University of Western Australia

The third match of the South Africans' tour was also against Western Australia, but this time against a team containing only two of the players they had played the previous week, and none of the players that had players the Warriors' recent Pura Cup game. South Africa still failed to win, and conceded an eight-run first innings deficit in a drawn game. Meanwhile, in the Pura Cup, the Tigers batted to six for 311 on the first day against the Redbacks, with 292 of the runs coming in a fourth-wicket stand between Travis Birt (who made 140) and George Bailey (155). Sean Clingeleffer also made a half-century, as the Tigers declared on eight for 421, but the Redbacks batted to a total of 638 after five batsmen passed 50 and eight passed 30. The Tigers, however, batted to four for 291 and a draw, as opener David Dawson batted for six and a half hours for 144 not out, a career best score and his second century in 14 first-class games.

- Tour match, 11 – 13 December: Western Australia XI drew with South Africans
- Pura Cup, 12 – 15 December: Southern Redbacks (2pts) drew with Tasmanian Tigers (0pts)

=== Last matches before Christmas ===
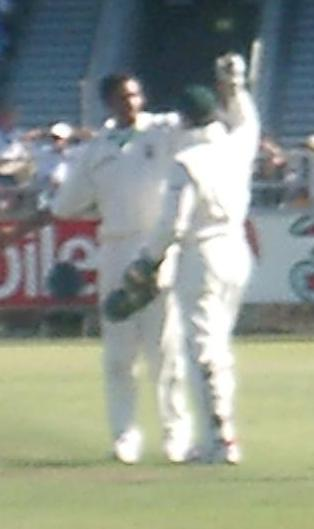
South African bowler Makhaya Ntini (left) celebrates

Australia went into the Test at the WACA Ground as favourites, but still conceded a first innings lead, before Brad Hodge scored a maiden Test century in the second innings. He went on to convert it to a double, ending with 203 not out, and Australia declared on eight for 528. South Africa were left to chase 491 for the victory, or bat for four sessions for the draw; the latter was achieved and the teams would go into the Boxing Day Test with the series tied at 0–0. The Melbourne Herald Sun claimed that the Australian captain Ponting "was dealing with one of the biggest blunders of his career", after Australia failed to win the match.

With the Warriors out of their own stadium due to the Test match, they travelled east to Queensland and the Gabba, where Brett Dorey and Beau Casson helped them restrict the Bulls while in the field. In the first innings, Dorey bowled the most of any Warriors bowler, and in his 31 overs he took a career-best seven for 87. The Bulls lost their last eight wickets for 116, but still posted 308 after a century from opener Lachlan Stevens, his first ton in first-class cricket. Another seven-for came in the Warriors' innings, when the Bulls' Michael Kasprowicz took seven for 103, as the Warriors lost their last eight wickets for 114, two less than Queensland. However, with three half-centuries from Clint Heron, Marcus North and Damien Martyn having sent the Warriors to three for 217, they took a lead of 23. The Bulls were then bowled out for 242, spinner Casson taking five for 88 including two ducks, but with the seventh ball of the Warriors' innings they lost Chris Rogers for three, and after Clint Heron hit a half-century, seven balls from Andy Bichel yielded three wickets and sent the Warriors from 129 for 3 to 130 for 6. Bichel then held a catch at gully to dismiss Campbell, but with 47 required and three wickets in hand, Shaun Marsh and Dorey combined to give the Warriors the winning runs.

There were four matches in the Women's National League this weekend; New South Wales and South Australia won one each of the two matches played at Newcastle, with Karen Rolton hitting an unbeaten 141 in the second match for the Southern Scorpions, while Queensland Fire won both matches against Western Fury. Two ING Cup matches were also played out on 18 December; the Bushrangers chased down a target of 247 set by the Tigers after David Hussey and Cameron White shared a fourth-wicket stand of 162, while Phil Jaques hit an unbeaten 158, a career-best in List A cricket, to give the Blues a total of 282 for 4 before Stuart Clark (7.3–0–36–4) and Michael Clarke (8–0–27–3) helped to bowl out the Redbacks for 209, which gave the Blues a 73-run win and five points in this top-of-the-table battle. The Blues now had a seven-point lead over the second-placed Bushrangers. Four days later, the round of games was completed, with the Warriors posting 226 against the Bulls after Damien Martyn, Marcus North and Dave Bandy hit half-centuries. Pete Worthington then claimed the first five wickets, as the Bulls were five for 113, and they eventually needed ten off the last over. However, Chris Hartley hit a six off the first ball, and with two needed to win off three balls he hit another six to secure the victory.

- First Test, 16 – 20 December: Australia drew with South Africa
- Pura Cup, 17 – 20 December: Western Warriors (6pts) beat Queensland Bulls (0pts) by three wickets
- Women's National League, 17 December: New South Wales Breakers (5pts) beat Southern Scorpions (0pts) by 60 runs (D/L Method)
- Women's National League, 17 December: Queensland Fire (5pts) beat Western Fury (0pts) by 38 runs (D/L Method)
- Women's National League, 18 December: Southern Scorpions (4pts) beat New South Wales Breakers (0pts) by three runs
- Women's National League, 18 December: Queensland Fire (4pts) beat Western Fury (0pts) by four wickets
- ING Cup, 18 December: Victorian Bushrangers (4pts) beat Tasmanian Tigers (0pts) by six wickets
- ING Cup, 18 December: New South Wales Blues (5pts) beat Southern Redbacks (0pts) by 73 runs
- ING Cup, 22 December: Queensland Bulls (4pts) beat Western Warriors (0pts) by two wickets

=== Boxing Day Test ===
The second Test began at Melbourne Cricket Ground on 26 December, Boxing Day, with Australia batting to two for 154 before Shaun Pollock and André Nel started taking wickets; Nel finished with bowling figures on the day of four for 58 as Australia lost seven wickets for 96 and were nine for 248. However, 107 runs were added between Mike Hussey and Glenn McGrath for the tenth wicket, a record in Australia–South Africa Tests , and Australia took a lead of 44 on first innings. A century from Matthew Hayden and 72 off 54 balls from Andrew Symonds gave Australia a total of seven for 321 before they declared, and South Africa were bowled out for 181, with Shane Warne taking four second-innings wickets.

- Second Test, 26 – 30 December: Australia beat South Africa by 184 runs

== January ==
=== Final Test ===
South Africa came back from their deficit to be in the advantage, according to Cricinfo commentator Peter English , on the second day of the third Test at Sydney. Jacques Kallis and Ashwell Prince broke an 80-year-old record for the highest fourth-wicket partnership for South Africa against Australia. Ricky Ponting then scored a century to bring Australia within 97 runs of South Africa, and rain cut 70 overs off the fourth day before South Africa declared 286 runs ahead midway through the morning session on the fifth. Ponting then hit another century, becoming the first batsman to hit centuries in both innings of his 100th Test, and guided Australia to an eight-wicket win.

Meanwhile, in the ING Cup, the Blues defended a total of 259 to beat the Bushrangers in the top of the table clash despite an unbeaten 123 from Michael Klinger, as spinner and former Test player Michael Clarke took three for 20, while the Bulls failed to take the opportunity to go into second place as they were limited to nine for 186 by the Tigers, who proceeded to chase down the target in the very last over after a sixth-wicket stand worth 100 between Michael Bevan and 21-year-old wicket-keeper Tim Paine.

- Third Test, 2 – 6 January: Australia beat South Africa by eight wickets and won the series 2–0
- ING Cup, 2 January: New South Wales Blues (4pts) beat Victorian Bushrangers (0pts) by eight runs
- ING Cup, 2 January: Tasmanian Tigers (4pts) beat Queensland Bulls (0pts) by four wickets

=== Twenty20 Big Bash ===
The group stage of this tournament began on 6 January and ran until 10 January, three days before the VB Series began. The Bulls opened against the Tigers at the Gabba in the first group, losing their first four wickets inside five overs with Ben Hilfenhaus taking two, but a 79-run partnership between Jimmy Maher and Steve Paulsen took the Bulls past the 15-over mark. Hilfenhaus got another wicket, ending with three for 17, and Paulsen was caught off the very last ball to end with 45 of the Bulls' total of seven for 136. In the fourth over of the Tigers' innings, heavy rain stopped play with the score on one for 15, and play was not restarted. In Group A, the Bushrangers batted to nine for 163 in 20 overs, though the Warriors' Ben Edmondson conceded only 16 in his four overs, taking three wickets. Cameron White and Liam Buchanan then put on 69 for the fourth wicket, and the last 43 balls yielded 74 runs for the Bushrangers. Adam Voges made a half-century, but after three run outs the Warriors needed eight off the last five balls. They got five, thus losing by two runs.

Between the first and second round of Twenty20 matches, there were two women's games between Victoria Spirit and New South Wales Breakers in Melbourne. New South Wales won them both to end with seven wins, while Victoria fell down to fourth place in the table after the two defeats.

The Bushrangers made it two from two and qualified for the final two days later, after bowling the Redbacks out for 113 with Shane Harwood getting the best figures with three for 13. 14 extras and an unbeaten 41 from Jonathan Moss took the Bushrangers past the target in 12.1 of the allotted 20 overs. In the other group, the Bulls hit at a rate of 9.5 runs an over against the Blues, but were bowled out 15 balls before the end to end with a total of 167. Ian Moran took three for 21 for the Blues, getting numbers 6, 7 and 8 out, and also hit 12 not out in the chase. David Thornely shared a 59-run sixth-wicket stand with Moran to see the Blues to the target with two overs and five wickets to spare.

On 10 January, the Warriors and the Redbacks played out a match which had little significance, as the Bushrangers had already qualified from the group, yet 15,000 people came to the WACA Ground. They saw the home side bat to six for 174 after opener Ryan Campbell made a half-century, before the Redbacks lost their first five wickets for 33. Ken Skewes and Shane Deitz added 38 for the sixth wicket, before Dave Bandy and Campbell shared four of the last five wickets to bowl the Redbacks out for 120. In the other match, a virtual semi-final, Phil Jaques hit 61 off 30 balls for the Blues, the highest contribution to the Blues' total of six for 188. Adam Polkinghorne took three for 31 for the Tigers, but made 13 runs in the reply, as six Blues' bowlers got a wicket and helped bowl out the Tigers for 119 to send the Blues to the final meeting with the Bushrangers.

- Twenty20 Big Bash, 6 January, Group A: Victorian Bushrangers (2pts) beat Western Warriors (0pts) by two runs
- Twenty20 Big Bash, 6 January, Group B: Queensland Bulls (1pt) v Tasmanian Tigers (1pt); No result
- Women's National League, 7 January: New South Wales Breakers (5pts) beat Victoria Spirit (0pts) by 48 runs
- Women's National League, 8 January: New South Wales Breakers (5pts) beat Victoria Spirit (0pts) by five wickets
- Twenty20 Big Bash, 8 January, Group A: Victorian Bushrangers (2pts) beat Southern Redbacks (0pts) by eight wickets
- Twenty20 Big Bash, 8 January, Group B: New South Wales Blues (2pts) beat Queensland Bulls (0pts) by five wickets
- Twenty20 Big Bash, 10 January, Group A: Western Warriors (2pts) beat Southern Redbacks (0pts) by 54 runs
- Twenty20 Big Bash, 10 January, Group B: New South Wales Blues (2pts) beat Tasmanian Tigers (0pts) by 69 runs

=== VB Series Warm-ups ===
The South Africans scored almost twice as much as the Bulls in their warm-up match, as Boeta Dippenaar and Jacques Rudolph outscored Queensland's first eight partnerships. The two added 88 for the fourth wicket, helping to total 205, and Garnett Kruger and Shaun Pollock then shared six wickets with the first 61 balls of the match. Eventually, Queensland were bowled out for 111. The following day, the Bushrangers bowled out Sri Lanka for 120, with Allan Wise taking five for 25, before Michael Klinger hit a half-century and Victoria won with seven wickets and 15.4 overs to spare, and in a final warm-up the South Africans beat the Queensland Academy by 46 runs after 80 from Jacques Kallis.

- Tour match, 10 January: South Africans beat Queensland Bulls by 94 runs
- Tour match, 11 January: Victorian Bushrangers beat Sri Lankans by seven wickets
- Tour match, 13 January: South Africans beat Queensland Academy of Sport by 46 runs

=== Australia's first home loss ===
Five matches were played from Friday to Sunday; the VB Series began with two matches, while a full round of ING Cup matches was played on the Saturday. On Friday the 13th, Australia beat Sri Lanka by 116 runs in the tri-series opener, with Sri Lanka's two most experienced bowlers, Chaminda Vaas and Muttiah Muralitharan, yielding combined bowling figures of 20–1–140–0, while in the ING Cup, the Warriors won and earned a bonus point at home after chasing down 198 to win in the fortieth over, with Justin Langer getting a half-century. The following day, the Bushrangers beat the Blues to cut the deficit at the top of the table to six points, with Gerard Denton and Cameron White sharing six wickets between them. Chasing 188 to win, the Bushrangers were three for 160, but lost four wickets in 23 balls before Andrew McDonald's 14 not out took them across the line. In the final match, the Tigers and the Redbacks tied in a match that was cut from 50 to 35 overs a side following rain. Michael Bevan made 54 for the Tigers, who chased a revised target of 172 to win, and when Bevan was dismissed the Tigers required 13 off 14 balls. Three more wickets fell, Shaun Tait taking two in an over, and both teams had to be content with the tie. Finally, South Africa beat Australia by five wickets on a Sunday game in Brisbane, with Brett Lee conceding 17 off his final over after South Africa had needed 47 off 30 balls.

- VB Series, 1st Match, 13 January: Australia beat Sri Lanka by 116 runs
- ING Cup, 13 January: Western Warriors (5pts) beat Queensland Bulls (0pts) by six wickets
- ING Cup, 14 January: Victorian Bushrangers (5pts) beat New South Wales Blues (0pts) by two wickets
- ING Cup, 14 January: Southern Redbacks (2pts) tied with Tasmanian Tigers (2pts) (D/L Method)
- VB Series, 2nd Match, 15 January: South Africa beat Australia by five wickets

=== Pura Cup Week Six ===
The sixth round of matches began on 15 January, with the Warriors hosting the Bulls at the WACA, and after the Warriors had elected to bat and were bowled out for 190, centuries from Martin Love and WA-born Brendan Nash gave the Bulls a lead. Wicket-keeper Hartley also hit 73 for the Bulls, who took a 280-run lead on first innings, and though the Warriors replied with 407 after Adam Voges' 178, they were bowled out shortly before tea on day four to set Queensland 128 in 40 overs. After half-centuries from Jimmy Maher and Love, they broke that target with nine wickets to spare.

In the VB Series match at Brisbane, South Africa were sent back to earth by Sri Lanka, so that all teams had one win after the first round of matches. Jehan Mubarak and Kumar Sangakkara shared a 112-run stand for the second wicket on the way to a total of eight for 282, and though Jacques Rudolph and Mark Boucher hit half-centuries South Africa were bowled out for 188 in the chase.

The Blues and the Bushrangers had started a day later in their game at Lismore, and at the close of the third day's play the Bushrangers were in their second innings, leading by 92 with ten wickets in hand. Opener Jason Arnberger had batted for nine hours to secure a double century, ending on 235 not out before the Bushrangers declared, but despite a first innings total of 519 their eventual lead was 82 runs on first innings. With the last day rained off, the match ended in a draw.

Further south, the Redbacks and the Tigers avoided that fate, as the Redbacks rode on a 369-run first innings lead to win by 194 runs, bowling the Tigers out six overs after tea. Two people named Bailey took centre stage in the final innings – chasing 563 to win, Tasmania's George Bailey hit 130, but Redbacks' spinner Cullen took five for 146 as the Tigers were bowled out for 368. The Redbacks' win sent them second in the table, but four teams were within four points at this point.

- Pura Cup, 15 – 18 January: Queensland Bulls (6pts) beat Western Warriors (0pts) by nine wickets
- Pura Cup, 16 – 19 January: Victorian Bushrangers (2pts) drew with New South Wales Blues (0pts)
- Pura Cup, 16 – 19 January: Southern Redbacks (6pts) beat Tasmanian Tigers (0pts) by 194 runs
- VB Series, 17 January: Sri Lanka (5pts) beat South Africa (0pts) by 94 runs

=== First Twenty20 winners ===
South Africa suffered their second loss in three days in the VB Series, in a match with eleven single-figure scores. However, Phil Jaques made 94, the highest score by an Australian on ODI debut, and Brett Lee took career-best figures of five for 22 to help bowl South Africa out for 186, two less than in Brisbane three days earlier.

The Bushrangers and the Blues, the two teams that had topped the ING and Pura tables at New Year, also faced off in the Twenty20 final at the North Sydney Oval. Despite the match being played in front of a home crowd, the Bushrangers accumulated the highest total in Australian Twenty20 cricket thus far, ending with seven for 233 after Brad Hodge made 106 in 54 balls and Cameron White hit six sixes to end with 46 not out. White also took three for eight with the ball, as the Blues were at nought for 64 but then lost all their wickets for 76 runs to hand the title to the Victorians.

The last four matches in the regular season stage of the women's National League were also completed; Queensland hosted Victoria for two games, and qualified for the final after a 42-run win in the first match (where they restricted Victoria to 109 for 9 in 32 overs chasing 152 to win), and a century from 21-year-old Kasee Marxsen helped them set a target of 97 to win against the Bushrangers. The Scorpions travelled to Perth, but despite winning both matches, they finished third in the overall standings, and did not qualify for the final series against the Breakers. Queensland Fire finished second in the regular season ladder, qualifying thanks to more bonus points.

In the VB Series, Sri Lanka batted first at the SCG, and posted seven for 309 against an Australian team without Phil Jaques or Glenn McGrath. The Sri Lankan team, meanwhile, included Sanath Jayasuriya who returned from injury by hitting 114 off 96 balls to be named Man of the Match, as Australia were bowled out for 258. However, Sri Lanka failed to back up their winning run, as South African opener Boeta Dippenaar hit 125 not out against them two days later and helped set a target of 264. Sri Lanka were 224 for 4 in reply, but Mahela Jayawardene was bowled by Johannes van der Wath, and Andrew Hall then claimed two wickets in two balls and followed up with a maiden 50th over when Sri Lanka needed 11 to win.

- VB Series, 20 January: Australia (5pts) beat South Africa (0pts) by 59 runs
- Twenty20 Big Bash Final, 21 January: Victorian Bushrangers beat New South Wales Blues by 95 runs
- Women's National League, 21 January: Queensland Fire (5pts) beat Victorian Bushrangers (0pts) by 42 runs
- Women's National League, 21 January: Southern Scorpions (5pts) beat Western Fury (0pts) by nine wickets
- Women's National League, 22 January: Queensland Fire (5pts) beat Victorian Bushrangers (0pts) by 97 runs
- Women's National League, 22 January: Southern Scorpions (5pts) beat Western Fury (0pts) by three wickets
- VB Series, 22 January: Sri Lanka (4pts) beat Australia (0pts) by 51 runs
- VB Series, 24 January: South Africa (4pts) beat Sri Lanka (0pts) by nine runs

=== ING Cup Wednesday ===
All six state teams were in action in the ING Cup on Wednesday 25 January, with Victoria, New South Wales and South Australia recording wins. Victorian Bushrangers batted first against the Bulls, and after losing the first three wickets for 59, David Hussey added 205 with Cameron White to set a new state record partnership for the fourth wicket . White backed up his 85 with four wickets for 23 as the Bulls were 13 runs short of victory at the 'Gabba. In Hobart, there were two centuries in the match between Tasmania and New South Wales; Phil Jaques, who had been left out by Australia three days earlier, hit 138 as New South Wales posted 311 for 7, but Tim Paine responded with 111, sharing an opening stand of 179 with Travis Birt. After the opening partnership, however, Tasmania ended on 299 for 9, with Stuart MacGill and Aaron O'Brien claiming three wickets each. Another century came at the WACA; Mark Cosgrove hit 121 for the visiting Southern Redbacks, who set a target of 272 for the hosting Western Warriors to chase, but only Shaun Marsh and Chris Rogers passed 30 as the Warriors were bowled out for 163.

- ING Cup, 25 January: Victorian Bushrangers (4pts) beat Queensland Bulls (0pts) by 12 runs
- ING Cup, 25 January: New South Wales Blues (4pts) beat Tasmanian Tigers (0pts) by 12 runs
- ING Cup, 25 January: Southern Redbacks (5pts) beat Western Warriors (0pts) by 108 runs

=== Last week of January ===
Australia, again without the resting Ricky Ponting notched up consecutive victories over Sri Lanka; on 26 January in Adelaide, they successfully chased down 219 to win by five wickets after a half-century from Simon Katich, while makeshift captain Adam Gilchrist shared an opening stand of 191 with Katich at Perth three days later, when Australia needed 234 to win. In the two ING matches on 29 January, the Redbacks went unbeaten for their third 50-over match in a row after chasing 223 successfully against the Bushrangers, while the Warriors defended 236 against the Tigers despite 105 from Tigers captain Michael Di Venuto. To round off the month, South Africa and Sri Lanka entertained the Perth crowd, and a spell of 10–3–17–2 from Shaun Pollock limited Sri Lanka to 221. South Africa chased that down with five overs to spare and took another step towards the three-match final series. The win also meant Australia were assured of a place in the final.

- VB Series, 26 January: Australia (4pts) beat Sri Lanka (0pts) by five wickets
- VB Series, 29 January: Australia (4pts) beat Sri Lanka (0pts) by six wickets
- ING Cup, 29 January: Southern Redbacks (5pts) beat Victorian Bushrangers (0pts) by seven wickets
- ING Cup, 29 January: Western Warriors (4pts) beat Tasmanian Tigers (0pts) by 13 runs
- VB Series, 31 January: South Africa (4pts) beat Sri Lanka (0pts) by five wickets

== February ==
=== Conclusion, VB Series group stage ===
A round of three-day games started at Hobart on 1 February, with the Warriors bowling out the Tigers for 86 on first innings, as Steve Magoffin took bowling figures of 17–12–15–3. Chris Rogers then outscored the Tigers by hitting 135 in the Warriors' total of 215, and though the Tigers posted 276 the second time around, the Warriors chased it down with seven wickets to spare after a partnership of 106 between Rogers and Shaun Marsh. On 2 February, play began at the 'Gabba, where Queensland built a 287-run lead on first innings after 116 from Martin Love and half-centuries from numbers eight and nine, Andy Bichel and Daniel Doran. The Blues responded with 378, but Love and Shane Watson took Queensland past the target of 92 inside 17 overs after the first two wickets fell for 20. The Redbacks also surrendered a first-innings lead at Adelaide, though Victoria fell from one for 164 to 249 all out, and despite 68 off 64 balls from Shaun Tait of the Redbacks, the Bushrangers chased down the target after a half-century from Jason Arnberger.

In the VB Series, Australia played South Africa twice, winning both games after batting first; in the first game, they totalled seven for 281 after a 109-run sixth-wicket partnership between Mike Hussey and Andrew Symonds, and Brett Lee then took four wickets as South Africa were bowled out for 201. In the second, Australia batted to a total of six for 344, with Adam Gilchrist, Ricky Ponting and Damien Martyn all making half-centuries at rates quicker than a run a ball. Despite 37 off 16 balls from Johannes van der Wath South Africa made six for 287 in reply, losing again to make the 7 February match in Hobart a play-off match for the right to play Australia in the final.

The weekend between 3 and 5 February also saw the final stages of the women's National League, with New South Wales Breakers playing Queensland Fire in three matches at the North Sydney Oval. In the first match, the Breakers bowled out the Fire for 174, then chased down the target thanks to half-centuries from Leah Poulton and Alex Blackwell; the following day, it was the Breakers who batted first and made a sub-200 total. Chasing 155 to win, the Fire were six for 70, but wicket-keeper Jodie Purves made 61 and added 49 with Megan White for the eighth wicket to bring the series to a final decider. The Breakers batted first in that match, and made the lowest score of the series with 146 all out, as Jude Coleman took four for 28; and with another top-score from Purves, this time for 37, the Fire needed three with three wickets in hand. However, Charlotte Anneveld, who had taken her first wickets in National League cricket earlier on, took two wickets in the 47th over to complete a haul of four for 29, and Sarah Andrews broke the final partnership when she had White bowled for 13, leaving New South Wales winners by two runs.

In the international matches, South Africa led by three points before the final group stage match, but still needed at least a tie or a no-result to qualify. Sri Lanka batted first, and made nine for 257 after a century partnership between Marvan Atapattu and Sanath Jayasuriya, and Sri Lankan seamer Chaminda Vaas then took two South African wickets in the seventh over. Graeme Smith rebuilt with Mark Boucher (partnership of 58) and Ashwell Prince, but another double strike, this time from substitute Malinga Bandara set South Africa back to five for 114. Bandara took two more wickets, was named Man of the Match, and Cricinfo journalist Peter English described his performance as "stunning" . South Africa were eventually all out for 181, with Jayasuriya, Muttiah Muralitharan and Tillakaratne Dilshan chipping in with a wicket each, and Sri Lanka qualified for the three-match final series.

- Pura Cup, 1 – 3 February: Western Warriors (6pts) beat Tasmanian Tigers (0pts) by seven wickets
- Pura Cup, 2 – 4 February: Queensland Bulls (6pts) beat New South Wales Blues (0pts) by eight wickets
- Pura Cup, 2 – 4 February: Victorian Bushrangers (6pts) beat Southern Redbacks (0pts) by seven wickets
- VB Series, 3 February: Australia (5pts) beat South Africa (0pts) by 80 runs
- Women's National League, First Final, 3 February: New South Wales Breakers beat Queensland Fire by eight wickets
- Women's National League, Second Final, 4 February: Queensland Fire beat New South Wales Breakers by three wickets
- VB Series, 5 February: Australia (4pts) beat South Africa (0pts) by 57 runs
- Women's National League, Third Final, 5 February: New South Wales Breakers beat Queensland Fire by two runs
- VB Series, 7 February: Sri Lanka (5pts) beat South Africa (0pts) by 76 runs

=== VB Series Finals ===
In the first match of the three-match final series Sri Lanka pulled off a "convincing" loss to inflict the first defeat on Australia since 22 January. Set 275 to win after half-centuries from Marvan Atapattu and Kumar Sangakkara, Australia scored 51 without loss in the first ten overs, but a total of five run outs and three for 40 from Muttiah Muralitharan sent them all out for 252.

The second match saw Chaminda Vaas take three wickets as Australia were three for 10, but Ricky Ponting shared a 237-run stand with Andrew Symonds, an Australian all-wicket record partnership . Michael Clarke made his half-century in 27 balls, and Australia scored what was then their highest score in a limited-over international (five for 368). In reply, Nathan Bracken took four for 30 off six overs, and though Russel Arnold hit an unbeaten 64, Sri Lanka were bowled out for 201.

Having opted to bat in the third match, Sri Lanka set a target of 267 after half-centuries from Sangakkara, Arnold and Mahela Jayawardene, while Bracken got three for 44 for Australia. However, the target was no match for Adam Gilchrist and Simon Katich; the two shared an opening stand of 196 before Gilchrist was bowled by Muralitharan for a 91-ball 122. Katich also reached his century, ending on 107 not out, and with Ricky Ponting he guided Australia past the target.

- VB Series, 10 February: Sri Lanka beat Australia by 22 runs
- VB Series, 12 February: Australia beat Sri Lanka by 167 runs
- VB Series, 14 February: Australia beat Sri Lanka by nine wickets and won the series 2–1

=== Pura Cup Week Eight ===
The Tigers began their match one day before Australia and Sri Lanka faced off in the VB Series, and recorded their first win since November; the Bushrangers, by contrast, hadn't lost since November. The first-innings third-wicket stand between Michael Di Venuto and Travis Birt of the Tigers was worth 143, eight more than Victoria managed in their first innings, and though Cameron White and Shane Warne scored half-centuries for Victoria the second time around, they fell 121 short of their target of 409. In Sydney, the Warriors batted to nine for 508 thanks to centuries from Marcus North (151 not out) and Luke Ronchi (100), and Steve Magoffin and Brett Dorey then took three wickets each as the Blues were bowled out for 117. The second time around, the Blues made 478, but despite three wickets from spinner Jason Krejza the Warriors made it home with six wickets to spare.

- Pura Cup, 13 February – 16 February: Tasmanian Tigers (6pts) beat Victorian Bushrangers (0pts) by 120 runs
- Pura Cup, 14 February – 17 February: Western Warriors (6pts) beat New South Wales Blues (0pts) by six wickets

=== ING Cup conclusion ===
The final round of the ING Cup was opened in Brisbane, where the Redbacks posted nine for 313 after a century from Greg Blewett. Despite 12 wides from Redbacks fast bowler Shaun Tait, the Bulls were bowled out for 245, and the Redbacks secured a bonus point and a six-point lead over the third-placed Bushrangers, who needed six points in their match the following day to draw level with the Redbacks. On the same day, Australia Under-19 played their final match in the U-19 World Cup, losing their semi-final to Pakistan Under-19 by 163 runs to finish joint third with England Under-19.

Twice the run rate of the opposition was needed in order to obtain six points, and after Tasmania won the toss and batted to seven for 242, the Bushrangers needed 485 to be able to qualify for the final. Instead, they lost both wickets in the opening over to Adam Griffith, who got career best ING figures of four for 36 as the Bushrangers were bowled out for 128. This meant that the Blues and the Redbacks had qualified for the final before the final match between the Blues and the Warriors, which the latter won by a margin of one run; the Blues had needed seven off Ben Edmondson's last over, but two wickets fell on the first two balls, and Aaron Bird and Stuart MacGill could only add five from the last four.

In the only women's Test match of the season, the hosts won inside three of the scheduled four days; captain Karen Rolton opted to bat first, and made 63, and a half-century from Lisa Sthalekar took Australia to 250. Fast bowler Cathryn Fitzpatrick then got the best figures with three for 24 as India were bowled out for 93 and made to follow on, and in the second innings, Sthalekar got five for 30 and India were bowled out for 153, four short of making Australia bat again.

The final match of the Pura Cup's eighth week was also concluded; the Bulls earned a 138-run lead on first innings, then added 365 in their second with Clinton Perren making 168 not out before they declared. Andy Bichel and Michael Kasprowicz then shared eight of ten Redback wickets as the visitors were bowled out for 209.

- ING Cup, 17 February: Southern Redbacks (5pts) beat Queensland Bulls (0pts) by 68 runs
- ING Cup, 18 February: Tasmanian Tigers (5pts) beat Victorian Bushrangers (0pts) by 114 runs
- Women's Test, 18 – 20 February: Australia Women beat India Women by an innings and four runs and won the series 1–0
- ING Cup, 19 February: Western Warriors (4pts) beat New South Wales Blues (0pts) by one run
- Pura Cup, 19 February – 21 February: Queensland Bulls (6pts) beat Southern Redbacks (0pts) by 294 runs

=== Tour of South Africa begins, and ING Cup final ===
Australia embarked on their second set of matches against South Africa this season, this time in South Africa. The tour began with a Twenty20 international at the Wanderers, where South Africa won by two runs after half-centuries from Graeme Smith and Herschelle Gibbs. Australia needed 19 off the final over, but could only get 10 off the first five balls, and despite Brett Lee hitting the last ball for six over midwicket South Africa took the first spoils.

The women's team played a series of three One-day Internationals over four days in the last week of February; they began at St Peter's College, Adelaide, where two of the three matches. Australia won the first after being bowled out for 173 in 49 overs, with Karen Rolton taking four for 29 and helping to stop India for 161 despite 66 from Anjum Chopra. The second match saw no such efforts from Chopra, as India were bowled out for 89 with Cathryn Fitzpatrick taking five wickets, and Karen Rolton hit 47 as Australia won by four wickets.

On the same day as Australia's women secured the One-day Internationals, the men's tour of South Africa continued, this time with a One Day International win at Centurion. Australia batted first, making eight for 229 after half-centuries from Michael Clarke and Michael Hussey, and the recalculated target under the Duckworth–Lewis method was 204 in 41 overs. Graeme Smith hit 119 not out to take South Africa home with six wickets to spare. Back in Australia, the Redbacks hosted the Blues for the ING Cup final, and aimed to take their first win in 19 years . However, despite a match top-score of 49 from Mark Cosgrove and six wickets from Shaun Tait, the Redbacks could not defend their total of 154. Stuart MacGill secured the trophy with a leg glance off Darren Lehmann, the second time he'd hit the winning runs for the Blues in as many seasons .

The final women's One-day International saw India bat out 50 overs, but their total of seven for 128 was not enough, as Alex Blackwell and Rolton both hit half-centuries and took Australia to a nine-wicket win.

- Twenty20 International, 24 February: South Africa beat Australia by two runs
- First Women's One-day International, 25 February: Australia Women beat India Women by 12 runs
- First One-day International, 26 February: South Africa beat Australia by six wickets
- Second Women's One-day International, 26 February: Australia Women beat India Women by six wickets
- ING Cup Final, 26 February: New South Wales Blues beat Southern Redbacks by one wicket to win the ING Cup
- Third Women's One-day International, 28 February: Australia Women beat India Women by nine wickets

== March ==
=== Pura Cup Week Nine ===
New South Wales followed up their ING Cup trophy with a three-day defeat at the Bellerive Oval, after totalling 141 and 157 in their two innings. Tasmanian bowler Ben Hilfenhaus took ten for 87 in the match, including seven in the second innings, while Travis Birt top scored, hitting seven sixes and nineteen fours in a four-hour 160. Meanwhile, in South Africa, Australia suffered their second-highest loss by runs in One-day Internationals, Makhaya Ntini taking six for 22 as Australia were all out for 93 to lose by 196 runs. The result meant Australia had to win their three last matches to take the series.

On 5 March, Queensland Bulls won the league stage and made sure the Pura Cup final would be held in Brisbane after beating Victoria by 106 runs . Jimmy Maher and Matthew Hayden opened by adding 153 for the first wicket, and despite seven for 100 from Shane Warne, Queensland totalled 408 after an unbeaten 76 from Andy Bichel. The Bushrangers barely made half of that, ending on 212 with Jonathan Moss top scoring with 60, and Queensland declared shortly before the close of play on day three on five for 189. All five Bulls' bowlers got at least one wicket on the final day, and though Nick Jewell and Cameron White put on 100 for the fifth wicket, a double strike from injured leg spinner Daniel Doran after tea saw the Bushrangers to seven for 239. Michael Kasprowicz and Andy Bichel took the last three wickets to give Queensland their eighth successive Pura Cup final appearance. Australia also came back to 1–2 in the five-match ODI series in South Africa, successfully defending 255 to win despite half-centuries from Shaun Pollock and AB de Villiers. Brett Lee took four for 48 for Australia.

The Warriors could have gone second in the Pura Cup table if they had managed to force a win on the final day against the Redbacks, having earned a three-run first innings lead when Steve Magoffin had Dan Cullen caught behind for six midway through day three. Effectively 88 for three overnight, the Warriors lost nightwatchman Beau Casson and Adam Voges in the first session, but Marcus North and Dave Bandy batted out four hours in a 211-run fifth-wicket partnership. The Warriors batted out the day to draw the game, and were thus third, with a chance to qualify with a win in the final round at the Bushrangers.

- Pura Cup, 2 – 4 March: Tasmanian Tigers (6pts) beat New South Wales Blues (0pts) by an innings and 55 runs
- Pura Cup, 2 – 5 March: Queensland Bulls (6pts) beat Victorian Bushrangers (0pts) by 106 runs
- Pura Cup, 3 – 6 March: Western Warriors (2pts) drew with Southern Redbacks (0pts)
- Second One-day International, 3 March: South Africa beat Australia by 196 runs
- Third One-day International, 5 March: Australia beat South Africa by 24 runs

=== "The greatest match ever" ===
Those were words used by iafrica.com columnist Dan Nicholl following the fifth One-day International between Australia and South Africa. Australia had won the fourth match, taking victory by one wicket after Nathan Bracken and Stuart Clark added 23 for the ninth wicket and Clark and Mick Lewis batted together to secure victory in the last over, which left the series tied at 2–2 with one to play. Australia won the toss, chose to bat first, and amassed runs off the South African bowlers. Their total of four for 434 was the highest team total thus far in ODI cricket, leaving South Africa to chase 435 to win – over 100 runs more than any team had chased before.

Yet, they did it. Herschelle Gibbs and Graeme Smith added 187 in 20.5 overs for the second wicket, and though Nathan Bracken took five wickets and South Africa were down to the last man, Mark Boucher won them the game by hitting a four off the fifth ball of the final over. Gibbs and Ricky Ponting (164) were jointly awarded the Man of the Match award, but Ponting declined .

- Fourth One-day International, 10 March: Australia beat South Africa by one wicket
- Fifth One-day International, 12 March: South Africa beat Australia by one wicket and won the One-day International series 3–2

=== Pura Cup Week Ten ===
The final round of the Pura Cup was also played out; the winner of the Bushrangers–Warriors match at Junction Oval in Melbourne would join the Bulls in the final, while a draw would see it come down to quotient with other sides. The Tigers finished first, winning their third match in succession after bowling the Bulls out for 176 and 140, while Michael Bevan scored a century and captain Daniel Marsh made 96 not out. The Redbacks and the Blues played out a match with three declared innings at Adelaide; South Australia batted first, making seven for 541 after centuries from Shane Deitz, Cameron Borgas and Mark Cosgrove, and the Blues responded with six for 314 before declaring, knowing that their only chance of qualifying for the final would be a win in this game. The Redbacks batted for 27 overs, making three for 115 before setting the Blues 343 in a minimum of 100 overs. The Blues were five for 233 after 80 overs, when the Redbacks took the new ball , but Paul Rofe took three wickets in thirteen balls. In the last hour, the Redbacks needed two wickets, and claimed the last when Aaron O'Brien was bowled for 48 by former Australian Test bowler Jason Gillespie with seven balls remaining.

However, the result from Melbourne meant that the Redbacks' total of 26 points was not enough. The Warriors had earned a 19-run lead on first innings, though the Bushrangers' last three wickets had added more than their first seven (7–92 to 206 all out), and eight double-digit figures with a high of 66 from Chris Rogers gave the Warriors a lead of 360 with 15 overs left on the third day. Before this match, the highest fourth innings total to win at the Junction Oval was six for 209 by Western Australia in 1956–57. The final day was delayed by rain , but after four half-centuries and 46 not out from captain Cameron White, the Bushrangers totalled five for 361 to win the match by five wickets and qualify for the final. Warriors pacer Brett Dorey, leading wicket-taker for the season in the Warriors , ended with nought for 102 off 25 overs.

- Pura Cup, 10 – 13 March: Southern Redbacks (6pts) beat New South Wales Blues (0pts) by 45 runs
- Pura Cup, 10 – 12 March: Tasmanian Tigers (6pts) beat Queensland Bulls (0pts) by an innings and 40 runs
- Pura Cup, 10 – 13 March: Victorian Bushrangers (6pts) beat Western Warriors (0pts) by five wickets

=== South Africa Tests and Pura Cup final ===
The first Test of the three-match series in South Africa, at Newlands, was over inside three days after Stuart Clark claimed nine for 89 on Test debut to be named Man of the Match in Australia's seven-wicket win. South Africa batted first, making 205 with Nicky Boje's 31 from number nine the highest score, and Matthew Hayden and Ricky Ponting then brought Australia within 30 of that before Ponting was caught off the bowling of Jacques Kallis. Another half-century, from Andrew Symonds, took Australia to a lead of 103, and Clark was leading wicket-taker in the second innings to bowl South Africa out for 197, and despite three wickets from Makhaya Ntini, Australia made it to the target and won their third successive Test against South Africa.

In the second Test, Ricky Ponting scored centuries in both the first and second innings to pass Don Bradman's mark of 29 Test hundreds , while a five-wicket-haul from Brett Lee helped Australia take a lead of 108 on first innings despite 114 from Jacques Kallis. Half an hour before tea on day four, Ponting declared with a lead of 409, but weather conditions stopped play after tea and meant Australia had one day to bowl out South Africa and take the Test series win . AB de Villiers added 91 with Graeme Smith for the first wicket, but Shane Warne accounted for them both and four more to take his first five-wicket-haul of the series and end with six for 86. South Africa were seven for 181 at one point, but Mark Boucher put on 72 with Nicky Boje for the eighth wicket and 39 with André Nel for the ninth to give South Africa a chance of the draw; however, with six overs remaining, Makhaya Ntini was given lbw to Warne and Australia could cheer.

The final match of the domestic season was played at the 'Gabba, and after the Bushrangers had made 344 in the first innings (with three batsmen, Brad Hodge, Nick Jewell and David Hussey, making over three-quarters of the score), it was the hosts' turn to bat. They overtook the Victorian score with just one wicket lost, that of Lachlan Stevens for 66, and continued to bat well past it. In fact, they batted past the previous state record of 687 from 1930–31, with Jimmy Maher (223), Shane Watson (201, retired hurt), Clinton Perren (173) and Martin Love (169) all passing 150 for Queensland. They lost three wickets in four overs to Dirk Nannes after passing 850, but eventually declared on six for 900, the eleventh highest first class score of all time . The Queensland innings was also the first time in first-class cricket history that four individual scores of 150 occurred in the same innings. Mitchell Johnson then took two wickets before stumps on the third day, and four on the fourth, to help bowl the Bushrangers out for 202 and secure the Pura Cup for Queensland. Daniel Doran also took three wickets in the second innings.

- First Test, 16 – 18 March: Australia beat South Africa by seven wickets
- Second Test, 24 – 28 March: Australia beat South Africa by 112 runs
- Pura Cup Final, 26 – 29 March: Queensland Bulls beat Victorian Bushrangers by an innings and 354 runs and won the Pura Cup
