= Tom Plant =

Tom Plant may refer to:

- Tom Plant (speed skater)
- Tom Plant (cricketer)
- Tom Plant (politician)

== See also ==
- Thomas Gustave Plant, shoe manufacturer
