= NTCC =

NTCC may refer to:

- New Testament Christian Churches of America
- Northeast Texas Community College, USA
- Nantou County Council, Taiwan
- New Town Cricket Club, Australia
- Norwegian Touring Car Championship
- National Theatre Company of China
