= Simon Roberts =

Simon Roberts may refer to:

- Simon Roberts (actor), British actor
- Simon Roberts (photographer) (born 1974), British socio-documentary photographer
- Simon Roberts (Herefordshire cricketer) (born 1983), English cricketer, played for Herefordshire 2002–09
- Simon Roberts (Cambridge cricketer) (1926–2009), South African cricketer, played for Cambridgeshire and Cambridge University in the 1940s
- Simon Roberts (Australian cricketer) (born 1985), Australian cricketer
- Simon Roberts (footballer) (1876–1908), Australian rules footballer
- Simon Roberts (businessman) (born 1971), CEO of Sainsbury's
- Simon Roberts (Formula One) (born 1962), Formula One team principal
