= Matthew Wade =

Australian cricketer (born 1987)

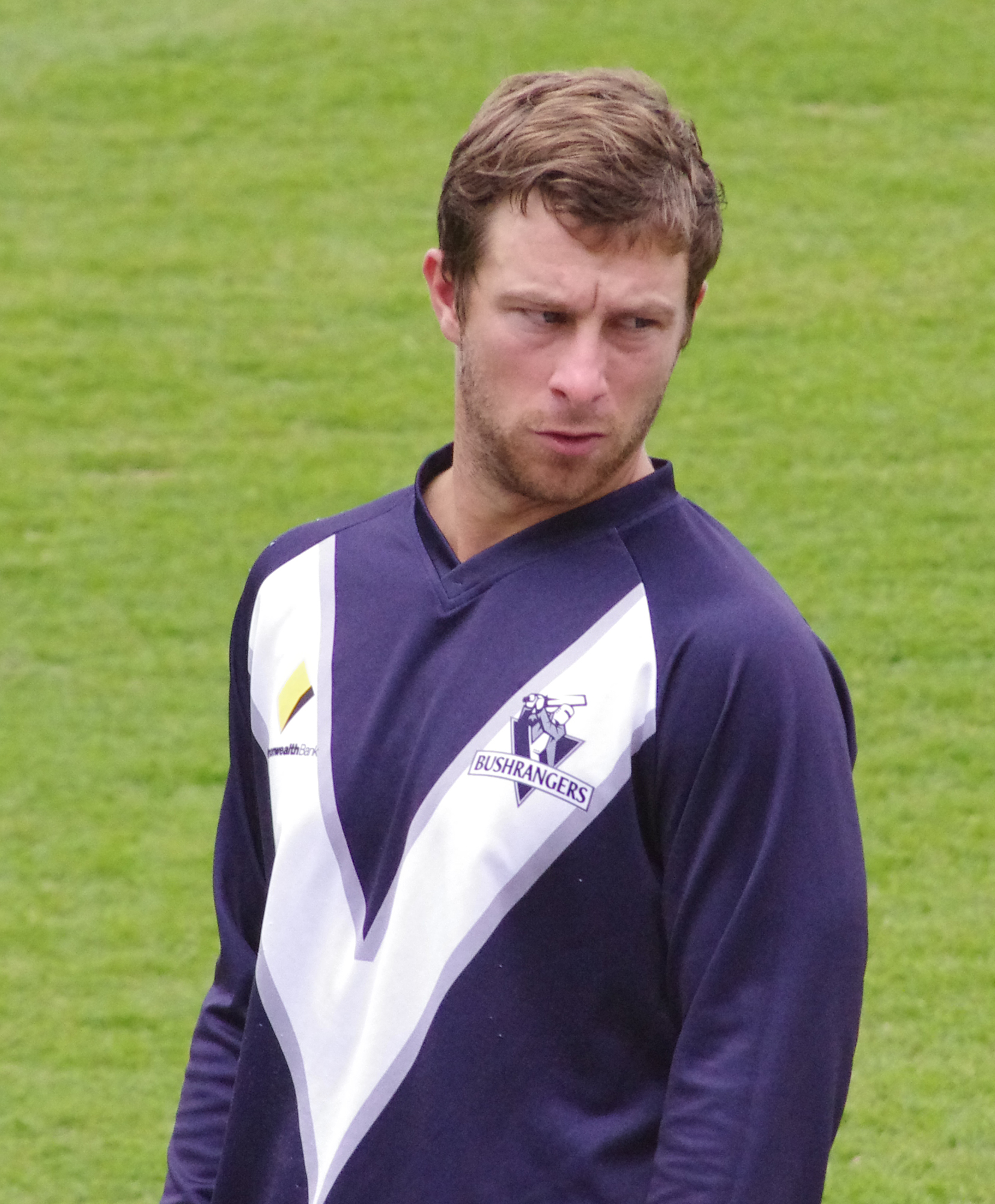
- Wade in October 2011

Personal information
- Full name: Matthew Scott Wade
- Born: 26 December 1987 (age 38); Hobart, Tasmania, Australia
- Nickname: Wadey
- Height: 1.70 m (5 ft 7 in)
- Batting: Left-handed
- Bowling: Right-arm medium
- Role: Wicket-keeper-batter
- Relatives: Scott Wade (father); Jeremy Howe (cousin)

International information
- National side: Australia (2011–2024)
- Test debut (cap 428): 7 April 2012 v West Indies
- Last Test: 15 January 2021 v India
- ODI debut (cap 192): 5 February 2012 v India
- Last ODI: 26 July 2021 v West Indies
- ODI shirt no.: 13
- T20I debut (cap 53): 13 October 2011 v South Africa
- Last T20I: 24 June 2024 v India
- T20I shirt no.: 13

Domestic team information
- Years: Team
- 2006/07,2017/18–present: Tasmania
- 2007/08–2016/17: Victoria
- 2011: Delhi Daredevils
- 2011/12–2013/14: Melbourne Stars
- 2014/15–2015/16: Melbourne Renegades
- 2016: Warwickshire
- 2017/18–2025/26: Hobart Hurricanes
- 2022–2024: Gujarat Titans
- 2022: Birmingham Phoenix
- 2023: Joburg Super Kings
- 2023: Karachi Kings
- 2023: London Spirit

Career statistics
Competition	Test	ODI	T20I	FC
Matches	36	97	92	166
Runs scored	1,613	1,867	1,202	9,187
Batting average	29.87	26.29	26.13	40.47
100s/50s	4/5	1/11	0/3	19/54
Top score	117	100*	80	152
Balls bowled	30	–	–	520
Wickets	0	–	–	8
Bowling average	–	–	–	44.25
5 wickets in innings	–	–	–	0
10 wickets in match	–	–	–	0
Best bowling	–	–	–	3/13
Catches/stumpings	74/11	108/9	58/6	442/21
Medal record
Men's Cricket
Representing Australia
T20 World Cup
Winner	2021 UAE & Oman
- Source: ESPNcricinfo, 24 June 2024

Matthew Scott Wade (born 26 December 1987) is a former Australian international cricketer. He plays domestic cricket for the Tasmanian cricket team.

In December 2020, Wade captained Australia for the first time in international cricket. On 15 March 2024, he announced his retirement from red ball cricket after the final match of 2023–24 Sheffield Shield season. He was an integral member of the Australian team that won the 2021 ICC Men's T20 World Cup.

== Personal life ==
Wade was born in Hobart on 26 December 1987. He is the son of Scott Wade, an Australian rules footballer who played for Hawthorn in the Victorian Football League (VFL), for Clarence and Hobart in the Tasmanian Football League (TFL), and served a long tenure as CEO of AFL Tasmania. His grandfather, Michael Wade, served as president of the Hobart Football Club. Wade is the cousin of Collingwood Football Club defender Jeremy Howe.

Wade represented Tasmania in junior cricket and junior football, vice-captaining the Tassie Mariners in the TAC Cup, where he played alongside future Australian Football League players Sam Lonergan, Grant Birchall and Jack Riewoldt. He represented Australia at the 2006 ICC Under-19 Cricket World Cup.

At the age of 16, he was diagnosed with testicular cancer, and received two rounds of chemotherapy before he was cleared of the disease.

Wade is colour blind. He has suffered difficulties on the field due to the colours of certain cricket balls.

== Domestic and T20 franchise career ==
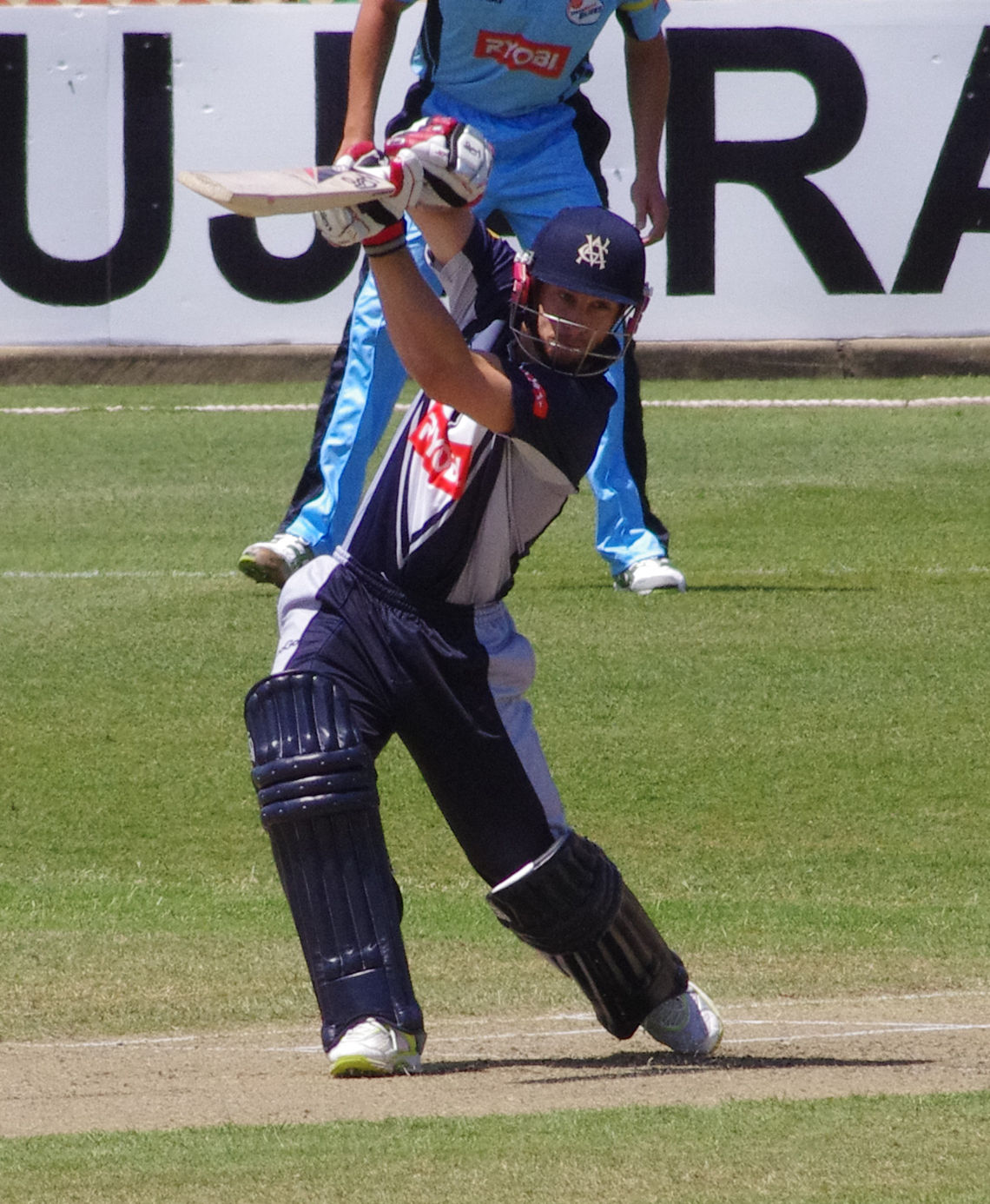
Wade batting for Victoria in 2011.

Wade played one List A match for the Tasmania Tigers in the 2006–07 Ford Ranger One Day Cup season, his only match for Tasmania in any form of the game in his first spell with the state team. His opportunities to be selected as a wicketkeeper in his home state were minimal due to the presence of Tim Paine, who at the time was seen as the likely successor to Brad Haddin as wicketkeeper in the Australian national team. Rather than attempt to become a specialist batsman, Wade moved to Victoria in the 2007/08 season, and within two years had established himself as the state's first choice wicketkeeper ahead of incumbent Adam Crosthwaite.

Wade scored his maiden first-class century in the 2008/09 season. He made an important contribution to Victoria's win in the 2009/10 Sheffield Shield final against Queensland, when he came out to bat with the team at 5/60 and scored 96 runs. Victoria won the match by 457 runs and Wade was named man of the match. He was suspended and fined for pitch tampering in 2013 and in February 2015, scored 152 for Victoria in the Sheffield Shield, his highest first-class score to date.

In January 2011, Wade signed with the Delhi Daredevils, going on to play three times for Delhi in the 2011 Indian Premier League.

Before the 2017/18 season, Wade chose to return to his home state of Tasmania for family reasons. He assumed the first choice wicket keeper role with Tim Paine a member of the Test team, although Wade was selected as a specialist batsman when Paine returned from national duties. The move also saw Wade traded from the Melbourne Renegades to the Hobart Hurricanes in the Big Bash. He went on to be named in the Sheffield Shield team of the year in March 2018.

Mid-way through the 2018/19 season, Wade was appointed captain of Tasmanian team and the Hurricanes after a decision by Cricket Tasmania to remove George Bailey to focus on his batting performance.

In February 2022, he was bought by the Gujarat Titans in the auction for the 2022 Indian Premier League tournament. In April 2022, he was bought by the Birmingham Phoenix for the 2022 season of The Hundred in England. In December 2022, Wade was drafted by the Karachi Kings as their Platinum Category round pick at the 2023 PSL draft

In March 2024, Wade announced he would retire from first-class cricket after the final for the 2023-2024 Sheffield Shield season.

In September 2026, Wade announced his retirement from the Big Bash League.

== International career ==
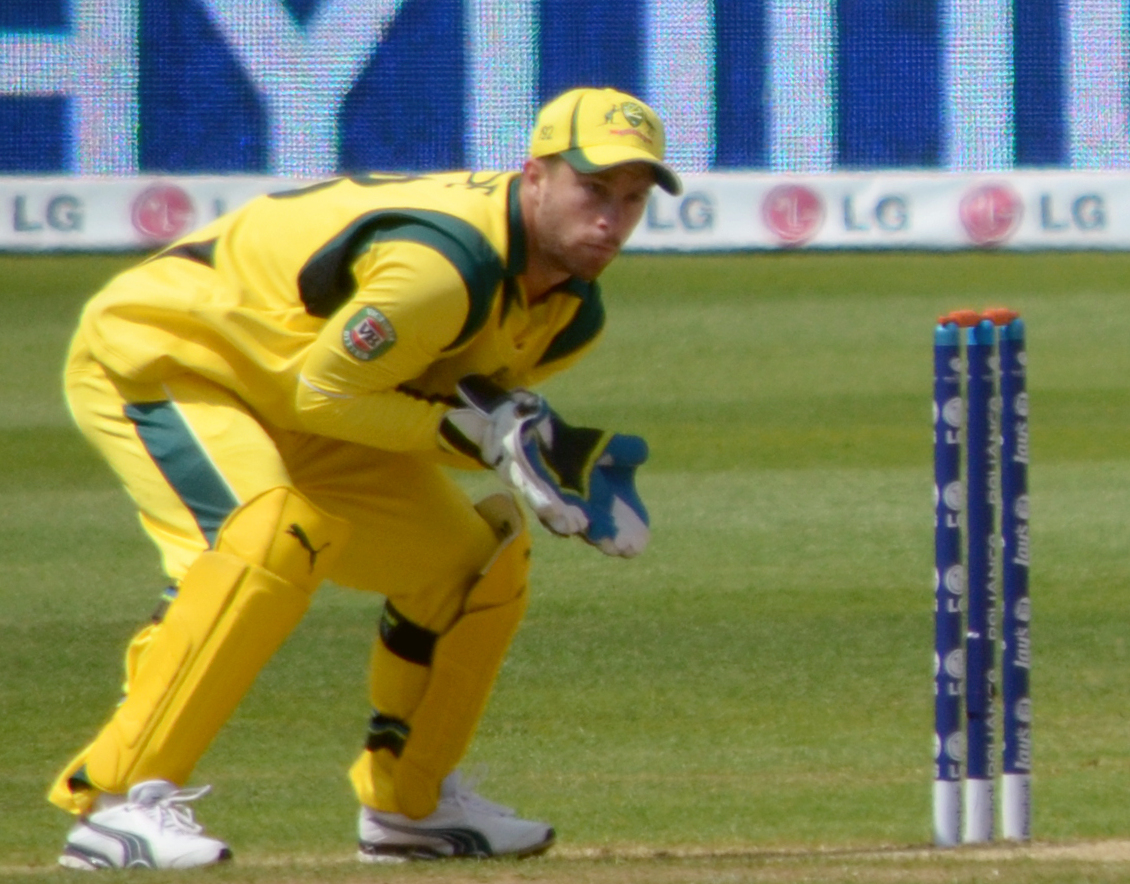
Wade wicketkeeping for Australia in 2013 ODI

Following his success in domestic limited overs cricket, Wade was called up to the Australian team for the first time in October 2011, for a Twenty20 International against South Africa. In February 2012, he made his international breakthrough as a T20I player against India in Sydney, opening the batting and scoring 72 runs from 43 balls to earn the Man of the Match award.

Following that T20I series, Wade was called up to the Australian One Day International team for the 2011–12 Commonwealth Bank Series. He won the Man of the Match award on debut, scoring 67 runs off 69 balls against India at the Melbourne Cricket Ground. During the series, he cemented his place as Australia's first choice limited overs wicket-keeper, and usually opened the batting.

Wade was part of the Australian team for the 2011–12 tour of the West Indies as the limited overs wicketkeeper. However, after Test wicketkeeper Brad Haddin returned home before the Test matches because his daughter was ill, Wade was selected to replace him. He made his Test debut on 7 April against the West Indies at Barbados, and scored his maiden Test century (106) in the third Test in Roseau. Wade was then selected ahead of Haddin for Australia's following Test series against South Africa in November 2012, and held his place until the end of the 2012–13 season, encompassing a home series against Sri Lanka, and a tour of India. He scored his second Test century in the third Test against Sri Lanka in Sydney.

However, from the 2013 Ashes series, Wade lost his Test position to Brad Haddin. He retained his position as ODI wicketkeeper for a period of time, but was ultimately left out of the Australian 2015 Cricket World Cup squad for Haddin. However, after the retirement of Brad Haddin at the end of 2014–15, Wade was recalled to the team for the ODI, and T20I series against England in 2015; but, lost the Test wicketkeeping position to Peter Nevill. It was not until November 2016, three and a half years after his previous Test match, that Wade returned to the Test team, recalled ahead of a struggling Nevill, for the third Test against South Africa, and the subsequent home series against Pakistan.

On 13 January 2017, in the first ODI against Pakistan of a 5-match series, Wade scored his maiden ODI century, which came from 100 balls. He reached 100 on the final ball of Australia's innings, and his effort came when Australia was in trouble at 5 for 78 early in the innings. On the second last ball he got 2 runs off of a ball hit to the infield due to a misfield, which allowed him to retain the strike to complete the hundred. Wade was given out LBW earlier in his innings, but the decision was overturned after he asked for a review.

On 27 January 2017, he was named as ODI captain of Australia in injured Steve Smith's place for their series against New Zealand. He was not fit for the first ODI and ruled out from the squad. Aaron Finch was named stand-in captain for the match. Before the second ODI of that series Wade was ruled out of series due to back injury and Finch continued to captain in the remaining matches.

In July 2019, Wade was added to Australia's squad for the 2019 Cricket World Cup, as cover for Usman Khawaja, who was ruled out of the knock-out stage of the tournament with a hamstring injury.

In July 2019, he was named in Australia's squad for the 2019 Ashes series in England. Wade played in all five matches, making 337 runs across 10 innings at an average 33.70, including two centuries. The series was drawn 2-2. In April 2020, Cricket Australia awarded Wade with a central contract ahead of the 2020–21 season.

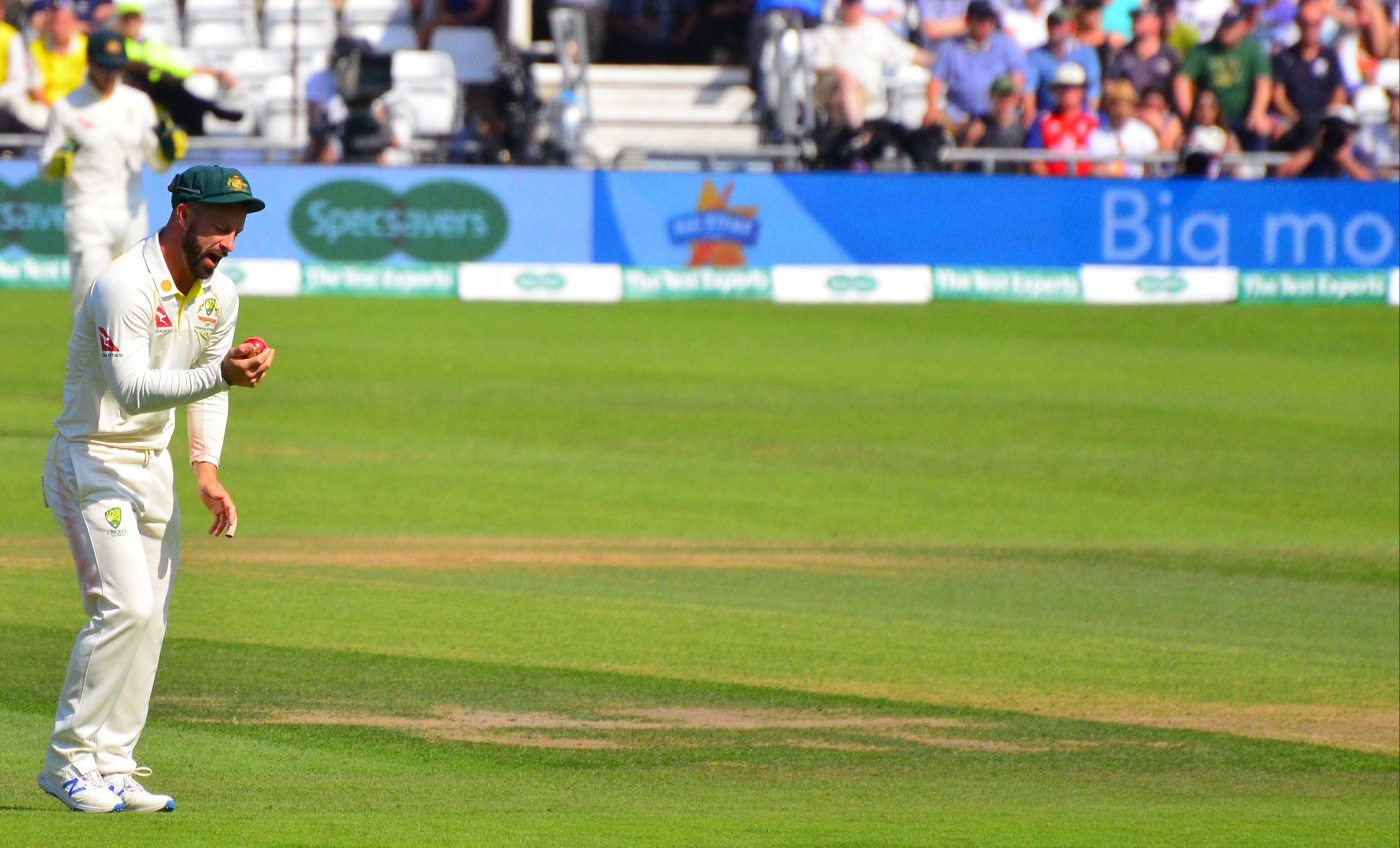
Wade fielding during the third Test of the 2019 Ashes at Headingley

On 16 July 2020, Wade was named in a 26-man preliminary squad of players to begin training ahead of a possible tour to England following the COVID-19 pandemic. On 14 August 2020, Cricket Australia confirmed that the fixtures would be taking place, with Wade included in the touring party. On 6 December 2020, Wade captained Australia for the first time, leading the team in a T20I match against India at the SCG after Aaron Finch was ruled out due to injury. In August 2021, he was named captain for Australia's five-match T20I series against Bangladesh. Later the same month, Wade was named in Australia's squad for the 2021 ICC Men's T20 World Cup.

In May 2024, he was named in Australia’s squad for the 2024 ICC Men's T20 World Cup tournament.

On 29 October 2024, Wade announced his retirement from international cricket.

== List of international centuries ==
He has scored four centuries in Test matches and one in a One Day International. His highest Test score of 117 came against England at The Oval in September 2019. His highest ODI score of 100 not out came against Pakistan at The Gabba in January 2017.

Test centuries
No.	Score	Opponents	Venue	Date	Result	Ref
1	106	West Indies	Windsor Park, Dominica	23 April 2012	Australia won	
2	102*	Sri Lanka	Sydney Cricket Ground, Sydney	3 January 2013	Australia won	
3	110	England	Edgbaston Cricket Ground, Birmingham	1 August 2019	Australia won	
4	117	England	The Oval, London	12 September 2019	Australia lost	

ODI centuries
No.	Score	Opponents	Venue	Date	Result	Ref
1	100*	Pakistan	The Gabba, Brisbane	13 January 2017	Australia won	
