= Frankston Peninsula Cricket Club =

- One Day name: Frankston Peninsula Heat

Personnel
- Captain: (Australia) Scott Boland
- Coach: (Australia) Peter Marshall
- Chief executive: Dennis Prendergast

Team information
- Colors: Red , Gold & Blue
- Founded: 1880 (Frankston Cricket Club)
- Home ground: Adrian Butler Oval

History
- 1st XI 2 Day wins: 0
- 1st XI One Day wins: 0
- 1st XI T20 Cup wins: 0
- Official website: www.fpcc.vic.cricket.com.au

The Frankston Peninsula Cricket Club is a cricket club in Victorian Premier Cricket, the elite club competition of Melbourne, Australia. The club played sub-district cricket from 1974-75 to 1992-93 and played its first season of premier cricket in 1993-94. Its home ground is the Adrian Butler Oval in Frankston.

Since promotion from the sub districts to Victorian Premier Cricket in 1993–94, the club has yet been able to win a 1st XI premiership; their best effort was runner-up to St Kilda Cricket Club in 2000–01.

== History ==
The Frankston Peninsula Cricket Club was founded in 1880 under the name of the Frankston Cricket Club. The club played in the Victorian sub-district cricket association, which is a step down from Victorian Premier Cricket (VCA), from 1974-75 to 1992-93. Then in 1993 the club was accepted into the VCA and changed its name to the Frankston Peninsula Cricket Club, starting a new era for the club. Frankston Peninsula played its first season of premier cricket in 1993-94 at its home ground, the Adrian Butler Oval in Frankston.

1996-97 the Frankston Peninsula Seconds won the Premiership.

During the 2001-02 season, the club finished a disappointing 16th in the competition. The 2002-03 season saw great improvement however, with the club finished in 5th on the ladder and an impressive 4th on the ladder in a positive one day campaign. In the 2-day finals Frankston Peninsula made it to the Grand final, playing St Kilda. With St Kilda 289 & 4/175 defeating Frankston Peninsula 201 at the Albert Ground. The next year saw the club perform just as well during the regular season, finishing 6th in the 2-day and one-day competitions. But in the 2-day finals they were again defeated by St Kilda in the Qualifying Final. The 2004-05 and 2005-06 seasons finished in disappointment, with the club unable to make the finals on both occasions. The 2005-06 season however saw the Club revamp its scoreboard The Tim Gloury Scoreboard to further enhance the facility. In a positive 2006-07 season the club finished 6th in the competition and 15th in a disappointing one day campaign. But were once again defeated by St Kilda in the 2-day finals and Footscray-Edgewater in the One-Day finals. The following year once again saw Frankston Peninsula finish 16th in the competition. The 2008-09 saw the club finish in 6th on the 2-day ladder and 15th on the one-day ladder. Carlton knocked out Frankston Peninsula in the finals due to wet weather giving Carlton the Draw they needed. In 2009-10, Frankston Peninsula finished 6th on the 2-day ladder and 15th on the one-day ladder, the same positions as the year before. They were once again defeated by St Kilda in the first round of finals.

== Ground ==
A game of cricket being played on the Adrian Butler Oval.

The Frankston Peninsula Cricket Club boasts two top quality playing surfaces the Adrian Butler Oval (used by the 1st and 2nd XI) and the Jubilee Park East Oval (used by the 3rd and 4th XI). Situated in between both grounds is the two story Kevin Collopy Pavilion, which allows spectators to view either game from a great view point. The Butler Oval was reconstructed in 1991 just prior to the Frankston Cricket Club's first attempt to gain admission to the VCA or Victorian Premier League. Since then it has won the Award for the best 1st & 2nd XI ground on 8 occasions. The East Oval was reconstructed in 1999 and after the 3rds and 4ths spent the 1999~2000 Season playing home games at the R.M.Hooper Oval in Hastings. The ground was adjudged the Best of the 3rds and 4ths Grounds for the next 3 seasons, including two more seasons after that.

The Collopy Pavilion, which overlooks both grounds, was completed in mid-2002 and was officially opened on 27 October. It commands a brilliant view of Port Phillip Bay, at night the lights of the City and on playing days the ideal view of games being played on both grounds.

Premier Grounds Award:

Firsts and Seconds (8): 1996/97, 1997/98, 1998/99, 1999/00, 2000/01, 2001/02, 2002/03, 2005/06, 2009/10.

Thirds and Fourths (5): 2000/01, 2001/02, 2002/03, 2005/06, 2007/08.

== Club song ==
If you are a Frankston boy, then sing along with me,
We are the Heat on the road to victory,
All for one and one for all we will answer to the call,
We are the greatest team of all.
Good old Frankston boys forever,
We will always stick together,
We will always do our best to see it through,
For the good old red, gold and blue.

== Honours ==
Honors for the Frankston Peninsula Cricket Club in Victorian Premier Cricket, since the clubs induction into the Victorian Cricket Association in 1993.

=== Club ===
Premierships and Runners-up for all the clubs elevens since the clubs induction into the VCA in 1993.

Team	2-day		One-Day		T20	
Team	Premiers	Runners-up	Premiers	Runners-up	Premiers	Runners-up
Firsts	0	1	0	0	0	0
Seconds	1	0	0	0	0	0
Thirds	0	0	0	1	0	0
Fourths	0	0	2	2	0	0

=== Australian Representatives ===
Frankston Peninsula players who have also played for the Australian Test, One Day International or Twenty20 International cricket teams.

- Shaun Graf
- Bryce McGain
- Jon Holland
- Scott Boland

=== Victorian Representatives ===
Players who have represented the Victorian Bushrangers and have also played for the Frankston Peninsula Cricket Club. Brackets indicate time spent playing for Frankston Peninsula.

- Shaun Graf
- Bryce McGain
- Matthew Mott
- Nick Jewell
- Jon Holland
- Scott Boland

=== International Representatives ===
Players who have represented the International Cricket and have also played for the Frankston Peninsula Cricket Club

- Kushal Bhurtel
