= Nathan Wegman =

Australian cricketer (born 1977)

Personal information
- Full name: Nathan John Wegman
- Born: 4 June 1977 (age 49); Launceston, Tasmania, Australia
- Nickname: Weggy
- Batting: Right-handed
- Bowling: Right-arm fast-medium
- Role: Bowler

Domestic team information
- Years: Team
- 2007/08: Tasmania

Career statistics
Competition	List A	Twenty20
Matches	2	1
Runs scored	–	–
Batting average	–	–
100s/50s	–	–
Top score	–	–
Balls bowled	99	18
Wickets	5	0
Bowling average	15.60	–
5 wickets in innings	0	–
10 wickets in match	0	–
Best bowling	4/44	–
Catches/stumpings	0/–	0/–
- Source: CricInfo, 18 July 2020

Nathan Wegman (born 4 June 1977) is an Australian former cricketer who played for Tasmania in 2007–08. He plays his club cricket for New Town Cricket Club. He is a tall fast bowler with a whipping action, who produces deceptive pace. In his debut List A match for the Tigers, Wegman bowled beautifully to take 4/44 off 8.5 overs, including the prized wicket of New South Wales captain Simon Katich.

Although a Launcestonian by birth, Nathan moved to Clarence to play in the more competitive TCA competition, a move which paid dividends when he was called up to the Tasmanian Tigers to help cover the bowling injury crisis of 2006.
