= James Packman =

Australian cricketer (born 1979)

Personal information
- Full name: James Russell Packman
- Born: 21 August 1979 (age 47); Paddington, New South Wales, Australia
- Batting: Right-handed
- Role: Batsman

Domestic team information
- Years: Team
- 2005: New South Wales

Career statistics
Competition	FC	LA
Matches	5	2
Runs scored	267	35
Batting average	26.70	17.50
100s/50s	1/0	0/0
Top score	107	33
Catches/stumpings	1/-	1/-
- Source: CricketArchive, 29 September 2014

James Russell Packman (born 21 August 1979) is a former Australian professional cricketer who played at state level for New South Wales during the 2004–05 domestic season. A right-handed middle-order batsman from Sydney, Packman made his first-grade debut for Gordon in the Sydney Grade Cricket competition during the 2000–01 season. On debut for the New South Wales Second XI against the Victorian Second XI during the 2004–05 season, he scored 165 runs. He was subsequently selected to make his senior debut for New South Wales in the ING Cup, playing two limited-overs matches in January 2005.

Packman then played five consecutive Sheffield Shield matches for New South Wales, which were to be his only matches at first-class level. In his second match, against Western Australia at the WACA Ground, he scored 107 runs batting seventh in the second innings, his highest score and only century at state level. Packman's final match for New South Wales came in the competition's final, against Queensland in March 2005. He was run out without facing a ball in the first innings, recording a "diamond duck", but the team won the match by one wicket, winning its second Shield in three years. Packman is a graduate of Macquarie University, and was working as a funds manager prior to his cricket career. As of the 2013–14 season, he was still playing for Gordon at first-grade level, and has scored over 5,000 runs for the club.

Packman works as a Financial Planner having started with Westpac's BT and currently with Bell Partners - AHW Wealth Management.

== See also ==
- List of New South Wales representative cricketers
