= Ryan Le Loux =

Australian cricketer (born 1984)

Personal information
- Full name: Ryan Nicholas Le Loux
- Born: 30 April 1984 (age 42); Darlinghurst, New South Wales
- Batting: Right-handed
- Bowling: Right-arm leg break googly
- Role: All-rounder

Domestic team information
- Years: Team
- 2004–2005, 2014: Queensland
- Source: , 18 April 2020

Ryan Nicholas Le Loux (born 30 April 1984) in Darlinghurst, Sydney. He is an Australian cricketer who played for the Queensland Bulls in the Pura Cup in 2005.

He was the overseas player for Dutch Premier League team Voorburg Cricket Club in 2006 and 2007. He is also the current club captain of the Redlands Tigers in the Brisbane grade competition. In 2007, he set the record for highest individual score in a Brisbane first grade match of 302 against Beenleigh-Logan, overhauling the previous mark of 300 set by Sandgate-Redcliffe's Matthew Goggin in the 2002/03 season.

In November 2005 he acted at the twelfth man for the Australia national cricket team in a Test match against the West Indies.

== See also ==
- List of Queensland first-class cricketers
