= Grant Lindsay =

Australian cricketer (born 1979)

Personal information
- Full name: Grant Paul Lindsay
- Born: 25 August 1979 (age 47); Mount Waverley, Victoria, Australia
- Batting: Left-handed
- Bowling: Right-arm medium
- Role: Bowling all-rounder

Domestic team information
- Years: Team
- 2005/06–2006/07: Victoria
- Only First-class: 8 March 2007 Victoria v Queensland
- List A debut: 3 December 2005 Victoria v South Australia
- Last List A: 17 February 2007 Victoria v Tasmania

Career statistics
Competition	First-class	List A
Matches	1	15
Runs scored	8	88
Batting average	4.00	14.66
100s/50s	0/0	0/1
Top score	7	59
Balls bowled	48	336
Wickets	0	11
Bowling average	–	27.09
5 wickets in innings	–	0
10 wickets in match	–	–
Best bowling	–	3/34
Catches/stumpings	3/0	4/0
- Source: CricketArchive, 11 November 2011

Grant Paul Lindsay (born 25 August 1979) is an Australian cricketer who played for the Victorian Bushrangers. He is a right arm medium-pace bowler and capable lower-order batsman, especially in one day cricket. Seen as more of a one-day specialist, he played only one first-class game while playing one day cricket regularly from 2005/06 to 2006/07.
