= Adam Crosthwaite =

Australian professional cricketer

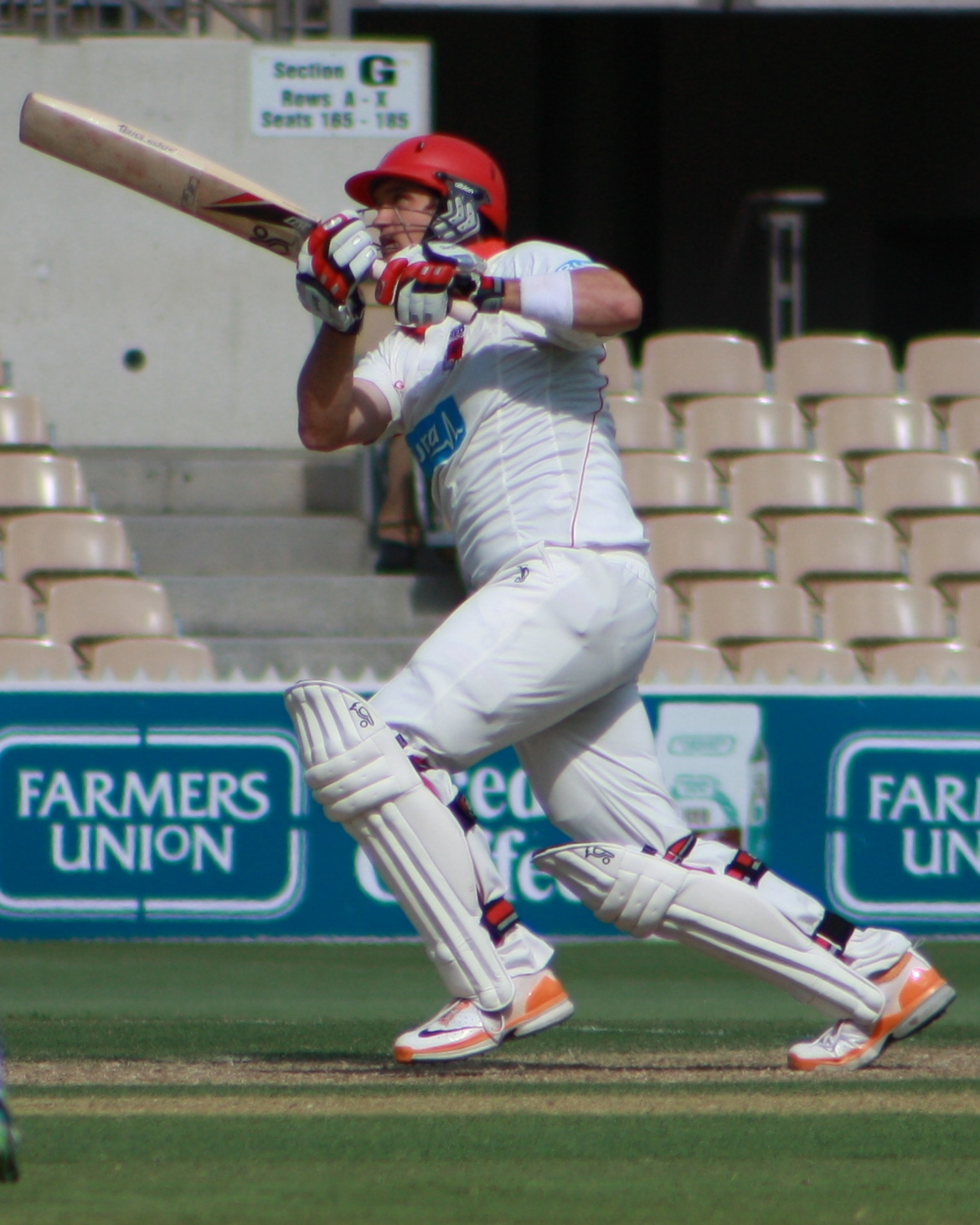

Personal information
- Full name: Adam John Crosthwaite
- Born: 22 September 1984 (age 42); Melbourne, Victoria, Australia
- Nickname: Tugger, Crossy
- Height: 1.81 m (5 ft 11 in)
- Batting: Right-handed
- Role: Wicket-keeper

Domestic team information
- Years: Team
- 2002/03–2008/09: Victoria
- 2009/10–2010/11: New South Wales
- 2011/12: South Australia
- 2011/12: Adelaide Strikers

Career statistics
Competition	FC	LA	T20
Matches	31	62	26
Runs scored	978	718	363
Batting average	21.73	20.51	20.16
100s/50s	0/3	0/4	0/1
Top score	72*	72	52*
Catches/stumpings	93/9	80/9	14/10
- Source: Cricinfo, 11 February 2020

Adam John Crosthwaite (born 22 September 1984) is an Australian former professional cricketer who played for Victoria, New South Wales and South Australia as a wicket keeper. He was part of Australia's Under-19 World Cup win in 2002.

Due to the emergence of Matthew Wade in the Victorian Side in 2010 Crosthwaite moved to New South Wales. He played for the Adelaide Strikers in the inaugural Twenty20 Big Bash League and moved to play for South Australia. He was member of the 2011–12 Ryobi One-Day Cup winning team for South Australia.
