= 2007–08 Australian cricket season =

- 2006–07 ^{.} Australian cricket season ^{.} 2008–09

The 2007–08 Australian cricket season consists of international matches played by the Australian cricket team as well as Australian domestic cricket matches under the auspices of Cricket Australia. The season lasts from October 2007 to March 2008.

== Australian Cricket Team ==
The national team reached the semi-finals of the one major international tournament during the season, the World Twenty20 in South Africa, and will also play a number of international matches during tours. Australia are confirmed to host six Test matches, 11 One-day Internationals and two Twenty20 Internationals, and play seven One-day Internationals abroad, all in a series with India. In addition, tours of Pakistan in March and West Indies in April are on the ICC Future Tours Programme, but no schedule has been confirmed.

== Pura Cup ==
The Pura Cup is scheduled to begin on 12 October with the four-day match between Queensland and Tasmania. After a home and away round robin league, where each team plays 10 first class matches, the two top teams qualify for the five-day final, to be played between 16 March and 20 March.

== One Day Domestic ==
The One Day Domestic Cup began on 10 October with last season's finalists Queensland losing to Tasmania by 89 runs under the Duckworth-Lewis method. As in the Pura Cup, the top two teams after the home and away rounds, which were Tasmania and Victoria, faced off against each other in the final at Bellerive Oval on 23 February. In a tense, rain-affected game, Tasmania just squeezed past Victoria by one wicket under the Duckworth-Lewis method.

== Twenty20 Domestic ==
The KFC Twenty20 Big Bash has been expanded again this season, from 13 to 16 matches in total, so each state plays each other once. The tournament opens on 31 December and lasts until 13 January, coinciding with the second Test between Australia and India. Last season each team would only play four games, and could thus not meet all teams during the round robin stage, but this has now been corrected. Victoria, two-time Twenty20 champions, will, however, play three away games.
