= Nick Jewell =

Australian rules footballer, cricketer

Personal information
- Full name: Nicholas Jewell
- Born: 27 August 1977 (age 49); Melbourne, Victoria, Australia
- Nickname: Tugga
- Height: 1.95 m (6 ft 5 in)
- Batting: Right-handed
- Bowling: Left-arm medium
- Role: Batter

Domestic team information
- Years: Team
- 2001/02–2010/11: Victoria
- FC debut: 28 February 2002 Victoria v Western Australia
- Last FC: 10 October 2010 Victoria v Western Australia
- LA debut: 1 February 2002 Victoria v Queensland
- Last LA: 18 December 2003 Victoria v Western Australia

Career statistics
Competition	First-class	List A
Matches	62	14
Runs scored	4014	384
Batting average	37.86	27.42
100s/50s	6/26	0/2
Top score	188	60
Balls bowled	216	12
Wickets	2	0
Bowling average	53.50	–
5 wickets in innings	0	–
10 wickets in match	0	–
Best bowling	1/7	–
Catches/stumpings	37/0	1/0
- Source: CricketArchive, 24 November 2010

Nicholas Jewell (born 27 August 1977) is a former Australian rules footballer and a professional cricketer who played for Victoria.

Jewell was educated at Caulfield Grammar School in Melbourne and played for Under-18s football for Prahran; in Year 12 at Caulfield, he set a then Associated Public Schools of Victoria record for the most runs in a season (later eclipsed in season 2005–06 by Melbourne Grammar School cricket captain Bryan Vance), and captained the school's First XI team. Jewell played one Australian Football League game for the Richmond Football Club in 1997, the club for whom his father Tony Jewell had played for, before turning his attention to cricket.

He made his second XI debut for the Victorian Bushrangers in the 2001–02 season, and made his senior debut shortly afterwards, in a four-run ING Cup loss to the Queensland Bulls. Jewell was seen as a one-day specialist early in his career and opened the batting with a focus on attack. This left him unsettled, and he switched between the second XI and the first XI for the following three seasons.

In the 2005–06 season he changed his approach and adopted a dour, defensive style that saw him start in all first class games played by Victoria. In January 2006, Jewell scored his maiden first-class century against New South Wales Blues at Lismore.

On 21 November 2007, playing for Victoria against Queensland at the Gabba, Jewell made his highest first class score of 188. He and Brad Hodge batted undefeated for the entire third day of the game, only the fourth wicketless day's play in the history of the competition.

Jewell played his premier cricket for St Kilda (1995/96 to 2007/08) and for Frankston Peninsula (2008/09 to 2010/11). He was more of an all-rounder at grade level than he was at first class level, averaging 39.0 with the bat and taking 160 wickets at 22.4 across his career.
