= Murray Bragg =

Australian cricketer (born 1984)

Personal information
- Born: 26 February 1984 (age 42); Brisbane, Australia
- Source: Cricinfo, 1 October 2020

Murray Bragg (born 26 February 1984) is an Australian cricketer who was a wicket-keeper batsman. He played in one first-class match for Queensland in 2007.

Bragg grew up in Jimboomba, Queensland on a thirteen acre property. He began his cricket career playing for Norths in Brisbane Grade Cricket and in 2002 he was selected in the Queensland Under-19's junior cricket team. In 2005 he graduated as an accountant and began working for Grant Thornton however flexible working arrangements allowed him to continue his cricket career and in 2006/07 he received a Queensland state contract as a wicketkeeper.

Bragg played his only first-class game in October 2007 replacing regular keeper Chris Hartley who went on to play 100 consecutive games for Queensland after Bragg's match. He moved to Valley for the 2007/08 grade cricket season, however his cricket career ended around 2008 and he continued working for Grant Thornton becoming an Audit & Assurance Partner in Brisbane in December 2018.

== See also ==
- List of Queensland first-class cricketers
