= Grant Roden =

Australian cricketer (born 1980)

Personal information
- Born: 29 February 1980 (age 46); Sydney, Australia
- Source: ESPNcricinfo, 23 January 2017

Grant Roden (born 29 February 1980) is an Australian cricketer. He played one List A match for New South Wales in 2005/06.

== See also ==
- List of New South Wales representative cricketers
