= Darren McNees =

Australian cricketer (born 1979)

Personal information
- Full name: Darren Alexander McNees
- Born: 14 June 1979 (age 47); Nyah West, Victoria, Australia
- Batting: Right-handed
- Bowling: Right-arm fast-medium

Domestic team information
- Years: Team
- 2004/05–2005/06: Tasmania
- FC debut: 24 February 2005 Tasmania v Victoria
- Last FC: 12 December 2005 Tasmania v South Australia
- LA debut: 18 December 2005 Tasmania v Victoria
- Last LA: 14 January 2006 Tasmania v South Australia

Career statistics
Competition	FC	LA	T20
Matches	3	3	2
Runs scored	54	18	3
Batting average	13.50	18.00	3.00
100s/50s	0/0	0/0	0/0
Top score	27	17	3
Balls bowled	560	162	36
Wickets	7	5	0
Bowling average	55.14	21.60	–
5 wickets in innings	0	0	–
10 wickets in match	0	0	–
Best bowling	3/47	2/28	–
Catches/stumpings	1/–	1/–	0/–
- Source: CricketArchive, 2 January 2011

Darren Alexander McNees (born 14 June 1979) is an Australian cricketer who played for Tasmania.

A tall fast bowler, Darren McNees toured India with the Australian Cricket Academy, but could not break into his home state's line-up. He joined the long list of the Tigers' imported fast bowlers as Tasmania kept seeking to find bowlers to back up their home grown batting talent. He impressed on his domestic one day debut, taking 2 for 28, but failed to hold down a regular spot in the side.
