= Tim Lang (cricketer) =

Australian cricketer (born 1981)

Personal information
- Full name: Timothy Elwyn Lang
- Born: 26 March 1981 (age 45); Mudgee, Australia
- Source: ESPNcricinfo, 4 January 2017

Tim Lang (born 26 March 1981) is an Australian former cricketer. He played first-class and List A cricket for South Australia in 2010/11 and Twenty20 cricket for New South Wales in 2006/07.

== See also ==
- List of New South Wales representative cricketers
