= 2008–09 Australian cricket season =

- 2007–08 ^{.} Australian cricket season ^{.} 2009–10

The 2008–09 Australian cricket season consists of international matches played by the Australian cricket team in Australia as well as Australian domestic cricket matches under the auspices of Cricket Australia. The season lasted from October 2008 to March 2009.

== Australian Cricket Team ==
New Zealand and South Africa both toured Australia, playing Tests and ODI series.

== Sheffield Shield ==
The Sheffield Shield opened on 10 October 2008. The season marked the return of the original name of the first-class competition, after being called "Pura Cup" since 1999.

The final was a drawn match between Victoria and Queensland at the Junction Oval in Melbourne. Victoria won the cup by virtue of finishing at the top of the points table.

== One Day Domestic ==
The Ford Ranger One Day Cup was won by Queensland, beating Victoria in the final on 22 February 2009 at the MCG.

== Twenty20 Domestic ==
The KFC Twenty20 Big Bash opened on 26 December 2008. New South Wales defeated Victoria in the final at ANZ Stadium, Sydney on 24 January 2009.
