= Tom Plant (cricketer) =

Australian cricketer (born 1984)

Personal information
- Full name: Thomas Christopher Plant
- Born: 31 March 1984 (age 42); Ashford, South Australia
- Nickname: Planty
- Height: 1.79 m (5 ft 10 in)
- Batting: Right-handed
- Role: Opening batter

Domestic team information
- Years: Team
- 2004/05–2008/09: South Australia

Career statistics
Competition	FC	LA
Matches	13	1
Runs scored	420	9
Batting average	16.15	9.00
100s/50s	1/0	0/0
Top score	125	9
Catches/stumpings	7/–	0/–
- Source: Cricinfo, 11 October 2024

Thomas Christopher Plant (born 31 March 1984) is an Australian former cricketer. He played in thirteen first-class matches for South Australia between 2004 and 2008. In 2007 during Sri Lanka's tour of Australia, he made 124 in a tour match for the Chairman's XI.

== See also ==
- List of South Australian representative cricketers
