= Adam Polkinghorne =

Australian cricketer (born 1975)

Personal information
- Full name: Adam William Polkinghorne
- Born: 23 August 1975 (age 51); Karoonda, South Australia
- Nickname: Polka
- Height: 185 cm (6 ft 1 in)
- Batting: Left-handed
- Bowling: Right-arm fast-medium
- Role: All rounder

Domestic team information
- Years: Team
- Tasmania

Career statistics
Competition	First-class	List A
Matches	2	18
Runs scored	60	174
Batting average	20.00	13.38
100s/50s	0/0	0/0
Top score	39	35
Balls bowled	306	617
Wickets	5	10
Bowling average	36.40	57.50
5 wickets in innings	0	0
10 wickets in match	0	0
Best bowling	2/32	2/35
Catches/stumpings	1/–	3/–
- Source: Cricinfo, 31 December 2006

Adam William Polkinghorne (born 23 August 1975) is an Australian former cricket player, who played as an all-rounder for the Tasmanian Tigers. He is more of a bowling all-rounder, and his fast-medium deliveries are difficult to score from. As a batsman he is a useful left-handed hitter who likes to slog down the order. As of 2006 he has so far yet to be able to transfer his exploits for club side South Hobart/Sandy Bay Sharks, where his club efforts have seen him named club player of the year four times.
