= New Town Cricket Club =

- Founded: 1923
- Home ground: New Town Oval
- Colours: Green/Gold
- Head coach: Peter Di Venuto
- Captain: Mitchell Owen
- TCA Titles: 14
- 2021/22: 1st
- Website: https://newtowncricketclub.com

New Town Cricket Club (NTCC), also known as "The Bucks", is a Grade level cricket club representing New Town in Tasmania's Grade Cricket Competition. NTCC play their home games at New Town Oval, in New Town, a suburb of Hobart.

New Town have won 13 premierships, including a remarkable 7 in 9 years during the 1960s, making them 5th on the overall winners list. Many talented players have played for New Town including three by the names of Joe Darling, Len Maddocks and Roger Woolley, who also represented Australia at test level. Mitchell Owen, who played in the Hobart Hurricanes maiden BBL victory also played for New Town.

== Honours ==
TCA Premierships: (14) 1925–26, 1926–27, 1927–28, 1929–30, 1930–31, 1938–39, 1961–62, 1963–64, 1964–65, 1966–67, 1967–68, 1968–69, 1969–70, 2021–22.
