= Simon Roberts (Australian cricketer) =

Australian cricketer (born 1985)

Personal information
- Born: 13 November 1985 (age 40); Adelaide, Australia
- Source: Cricinfo, 25 September 2020

Simon Roberts (born 13 November 1985) is an Australian cricketer. He played in one Twenty20 match for South Australia in 2007.

== See also ==
- List of South Australian representative cricketers
