= Jason Arnberger =

Australian cricketer (born 1972)

Personal information
- Full name: Jason Lee Arnberger
- Born: 18 November 1972 (age 53); Penrith, New South Wales, Australia
- Nickname: Cheese
- Height: 177 cm (5 ft 10 in)
- Batting: Right-handed
- Bowling: Right arm fast-medium
- Role: Opening batsman

Domestic team information
- Years: Team
- 1994/95–1996/97: New South Wales
- 1997/98–2005/06: Victoria

Career statistics
Competition	First-class	List A
Matches	88	27
Runs scored	6,049	541
Batting average	39.79	21.64
100s/50s	13/32	0/4
Top score	239*	79
Catches/stumpings	58/–	0/–
- Source: CricInfo, 29 April 2025

Jason Lee Arnberger (born 18 November 1972) is an Australian first-class cricketer who played for the Victorian Bushrangers and New South Wales in Australian domestic cricket. He was a right-handed opening batsman. Arnberger's nickname is "Cheese". He was born at Penrith, New South Wales.

Arnberger started his career with NSW but in 1997-98 he moved to Victoria as the presence of Mark Taylor and Michael Slater at the top of the order had made it difficult for him to get a game. Aged 31, he suffered a back injury which nearly ended his career but he came back strongly, scoring 639 runs with three hundreds and repeated his good performance with 721 at 45.06 the following season as he went on to win the Player of the Year award. His highest First Class score came against New South Wales in Lismore, making 239 not out. He finished his career in seventh place on Victoria's leading run getters with 5505 at 42.01. He is also in the record books with a partnership of 353 with Matthew Elliott against Tasmania. He is only one of 3 Victorian batsman to have twice scored a hundred in each innings of a match.
