= 2008–09 Sheffield Shield season =

Cricket tournament

2008–09 Sheffield Shield
- Administrator(s): Cricket Australia
- Cricket format: First-class
- Tournament format(s): Double round-robin
- Champions: Victoria (27th title)
- Participants: 6
- Matches: 31
- Player of the series: Phillip Hughes (NSW)
- Most runs: Michael Klinger (SA) (1203 Runs)
- Most wickets: Brett Dorey (WA) (42 wickets)

The 2008–09 Sheffield Shield season was the 107th season of official first-class domestic cricket in Australia. After nine seasons of being named the Pura Cup, it was announced that the Australian interstate trophy would return to its previous name of the Sheffield Shield as part of a new sponsorship agreement with Weet-Bix. The season began on 10 October 2008 when Queensland took on Tasmania at the Gabba. The two points table leaders at the end of the regular season, Victoria and Queensland, played each other in the final at the Junction Oval, with Victoria becoming Sheffield Shield champions after a drawn match thanks to their superior results in the regular season.

== Table ==
| Pos | Team | Pld | W | D | L | Quo | Pts |
|---|---|---|---|---|---|---|---|
| 1 | Victoria (Q) | 10 | 6 | 4 | 0 | 1.520 | 44 |
| 2 | Queensland (Q) | 10 | 4 | 1 | 5 | 0.949 | 28 |
| 3 | South Australia | 10 | 4 | 3 | 3 | 1.064 | 26 |
| 4 | Tasmania | 10 | 4 | 1 | 5 | 0.881 | 26 |
| 5 | Western Australia | 10 | 3 | 2 | 5 | 0.836 | 20 |
| 6 | New South Wales | 10 | 2 | 3 | 5 | 0.878 | 18 |

Source: ESPNcricinfo
Rules for classification: The top two ranked teams qualify for the final, with the top-ranked team winning the right to host the final.
- Points system: 6 for a win, 3 for a tie, 0 for a draw or loss.
- Bonus point system: 2 for a first innings lead in a drawn or lost match, 1 for a first innings tie in a drawn or lost match.

== Teams ==
| Club | Home Ground | Captain |
|---|---|---|
| New South Wales Blues | Sydney Cricket Ground | Simon Katich |
| Queensland Bulls | The Gabba | Chris Simpson |
| Southern Redbacks | Adelaide Oval | Graham Manou |
| Tasmanian Tigers | Bellerive Oval | Daniel Marsh |
| Victorian Bushrangers | Melbourne Cricket Ground | Cameron White |
| Western Warriors | WACA Ground | Marcus North |

== Fixtures ==
=== Round 1 ===
10–12 October
Scorecard

| (H) Queensland | v | Tasmania |
| 236 (55.1 overs); Chris Swan 76 (84); Tim Macdonald 4/42 (10.1 overs) | | 106 (46.3 overs); Brett Geeves 31* (69); Ashley Noffke 3/14 (14 overs) |
| 62 (31.5 overs); Chris Swan 16 (34); Ben Hilfenhaus 5/14 (12 overs) | | 144 (51.4 overs); Rhett Lockyear 34 (73); James Hopes 4/24 (11.4 overs) |

Queensland won by 48 runs
The Gabba, Brisbane
Umpires: Bruce Oxenford and John Ward
Player of the match: Chris Hartley (Queensland)

- Tasmania won the toss and elected to field.
- Points: Queensland 6, Tasmania 0

10–13 October
Scorecard

| New South Wales | v | Western Australia (H) |
| 177 (58.2 overs); Nathan Bracken 63 (45); Steve Magoffin 4/36 (19 overs) | | 265 (92 overs); Theo Doropoulos 41 (87); Grant Lambert 5/82 (21 overs) |
| 310 (116.1 overs); Dominic Thornely 97 (166); Steve Magoffin 6/66 (26.1 overs) | | 2/224 (54.5 overs); Luke Pomersbach 78 (74); Grant Lambert 1/41 (9 overs) |

Western Australia won by 8 wickets
WACA Ground, Perth
Umpires: Andrew Craig and Bob Parry
Player of the match: Steve Magoffin

- Western Australia won the toss and elected to field.
- Points: Western Australia 6, New South Wales 0
- Arron Crawford (Western Australia) made his first-class debut.
- Grant Lambert (New South Wales) took his maiden five-wicket haul in first-class cricket.

14–17 October
Scorecard

| Victoria | v | South Australia (H) |
| 6/473d (134.4 overs); Nick Jewell 164 (256); Paul Rofe 3/80 (27 overs) | | 7/357d (137 overs); Michael Klinger 150* (350); Shane Harwood 2/78 (28 overs) |
| 151 (46.4 overs); Shane Harwood 31 (54); Dan Cullen 3/60 (20 overs) | | 7/176 (61 overs); Daniel Harris 62 (141); Andrew McDonald 3/15 (9 overs) |

Match drawn
Adelaide Oval, Adelaide
Umpires: Rod Tucker and Tony Ward
Player of the match: Nick Jewell

- Victoria won the toss and elected to bat.
- Points: Victoria 2, South Australia 0
- Jon Holland (Victoria) made his first-class debut.

=== Round 2 ===
19–22 October
Scorecard

| Tasmania | v | Western Australia (H) |
| 187 (72.2 overs); George Bailey 71 (159); Adam Voges 3/12 (7.0 overs) | | 283 (87.1 overs); Steve Magoffin 79 (190); Brett Geeves 5/76 (23.1 overs) |
| 292 (127.2 overs); Rhett Lockyear 77 (134); Marcus North 3/51 (25.0 overs) | | 6/197 (59 overs); Theo Doropoulos 58* (85); Brett Geeves 4/62 (23.0 overs) |

Western Australia won by 4 wickets
WACA Ground, Perth
Umpires: Paul Reiffel and Mick Martell
Player of the match: Steve Magoffin (Western Australia)

- Western Australia won the toss and elected to field.
- Points: Western Australia 6, Tasmania 0

21–23 October
Scorecard

| (H) Queensland | v | Victoria |
| 245 (65.3 overs); Ryan Broad 96 (148); Dirk Nannes 4/45 (12.0 overs) | | 353 (113.4 overs); Robert Quiney 127 (216); Ashley Noffke 3/72 (26.0 overs) |
| 150 (49.4 overs); Greg Moller 38 (81); Dirk Nannes 7/50 (16.0 overs) | | 1/45 (11.2 overs); Nick Jewell 27* (37); Ryan Harris 1/27 (5.2 overs) |

Victoria won by 9 wickets
The Gabba, Brisbane
Umpires: Andrew Craig and Ian Lock
Player of the match: Dirk Nannes (Victoria)

- Victoria won the toss and elected to field.
- Points: Victoria 6, Queensland 0
- Robert Quiney (Victoria) scored his maiden century in first-class cricket.

24–27 October
Scorecard

| (H) South Australia | v | New South Wales |
| 313 (92.4 overs); Graham Manou 80 (124); Burt Cockley 3/37 (15.4 overs) | | 576 (162.4 overs); Phillip Hughes 198 (328); Shaun Tait 3/104 (29.4 overs) |
| 5/300 (117 overs); Michael Klinger 74 (199); Burt Cockley 1/39 (19 overs) |

Match drawn
Adelaide Oval, Adelaide
Umpires: Jeff Brookes and Rod Tucker
Player of the match: Phillip Hughes (New South Wales)

- South Australia won the toss and elected to bat.
- Points: New South Wales 2, South Australia 0

=== Round 3 ===
31 October – 3 November
Scorecard

| Queensland | v | Western Australia (H) |
| 208 (81.4 overs); Clinton Perren 58 (158); Steve Magoffin 3/23 (17 overs) | | 206 (85.1 overs); Marcus North 94 (199); Ryan Harris 4/67 (29 overs) |
| 8/321d (104.4 overs); Chris Broad 118 (224); Brett Dorey 4/75 (28 overs) | | 196 (63 overs); Luke Pomersbach 104 (158); Ashley Noffke 4/27 (15 overs) |

Queensland won by 127 runs
WACA Ground, Perth
Umpires: Ian Lock and Mick Martell
Player of the match: Ashley Noffke (Queensland)

- Western Australia won the toss and elected to field.
- Points: Queensland 6, Western Australia 0
- Paul Davis and Wes Robinson (Western Australia) both made their first-class debut.

3–6 November
Scorecard

| South Australia | v | Tasmania (H) |
| 232 (76.5 overs); Callum Ferguson 65 (86); Tim MacDonald 6/40 (14.5 overs) | | 252 (73.5 overs); Travis Birt 42 (86); Peter George 4/56 (15.5 overs) |
| 200 (70.3 overs); Daniel Harris 47 (122); Ben Hilfenhaus 5/53 (20.3 overs) | | 7/184 (73.5 overs); Tim Paine 69 (160); Mark Cleary 2/42 (18 overs) |

Tasmania won by 3 wickets
Bellerive Oval, Hobart
Umpires: Bruce Oxenford and Tony Ward
Player of the match: Ben Hilfenhaus (Tasmania)

- Tasmania won the toss and elected to field.
- Points: Tasmania 6, South Australia 0
- Peter George (South Australia) made his first-class debut.
- Tim MacDonald (Tasmania) took his maiden five-wicket haul in first-class cricket.

4–7 November
Scorecard

| (H) New South Wales | v | Victoria |
| 261 (91.1 overs); Usman Khawaja 66 (126); Clint McKay 4/33 (22.1 overs) | | 440 (143.2 overs); Chris Rogers 159 (302); Burt Cockley 5/84 (19.2 overs) |
| 8/340 (134 overs); Phillip Hughes 86 (171); Jon Holland 3/96 (38 overs) |

Match drawn
Sydney Cricket Ground, Sydney
Umpires: Paul Reiffel and Simon Fry
Player of the match: Chris Rogers (Victoria)

- New South Wales won the toss and elected to bat.
- Points: Victoria 2, New South Wales 0
- Burt Cockley (New South Wales) took his maiden five-wicket haul in first-class cricket.

=== Round 4 ===
10–13 November
Scorecard

| Western Australia | v | South Australia (H) |
| 309 (124 overs); Wes Robinson 141 (340); Dan Cullen 3/91 (41 overs) | | 9/479d (168.2 overs); Michael Klinger 255 (502); Brett Dorey 3/68 (27.2) |
| 6/247 (76 overs); Luke Pomersbach 144 (166); Allan Wise 2/24 (13 overs) |

Match drawn
Adelaide Oval, Adelaide
Umpires: Simon Fry and John Ward
Player of the match: Michael Klinger

- Western Australia won the toss and elected to bat.
- Points: South Australia 2, Western Australia 0
- James Smith and Tom Cooper (South Australia) both made their first-class debut.
- Wes Robinson (Western Australia) scored his maiden century in first-class cricket.

15–18 November
Scorecard

| Tasmania | v | Victoria (H) |
| 218 (90.3 overs); George Bailey 73 (185); Andrew McDonald 3/29 (17 overs) | | 484 (134.5 overs); Nick Jewell 92 (168); Brett Geeves 4/103 (31 overs) |
| 300 (112.5 overs); Brett Geeves 99* (147); Clint McKay 5/78 (30.5) | | 0/35 (7.2 overs); Chris Rogers 21* (20) |

Victoria won by 10 wickets
Melbourne Cricket Ground, Melbourne
Umpires: Ian Lock and Bob Parry
Player of the match: Clint McKay (Victoria)

- Tasmania won the toss and elected to bat.
- Points: Victoria 6, Tasmania 0
- Clint McKay (Victoria) took his maiden five-wicket haul in first-class cricket.

21–24 November
Scorecard

| (H) New South Wales | v | Queensland |
| 210 (78.5 overs); Beau Casson 63 (124); Chris Swan 4/21 (16 overs) | | 354 (101.3 overs); Martin Love 110 (206); Burt Cockley 5/76 (19 overs) |
| 262 (99.1 overs); Daniel Smith 70 (50); Chris Simpson 5/68 (24.1) | | 0/119 (29 overs); Nick Kruger 61* (77) |

Queensland won by 10 wickets
Sydney Cricket Ground, Sydney
Umpires: Gerard Abood and Simon Taufel
Player of the match: Martin Love (Queensland)

- Points: Queensland 6, New South Wales 0
- Chris Simpson (Queensland) took his maiden five-wicket haul in first-class cricket.

=== Round 5 ===
21–24 November
Scorecard

| (H) Western Australia | v | Victoria |
| 239 (98.4 overs); Marcus North 103 (231); James Pattinson 3/43 (20 overs) | | 326 (76.2 overs); Chris Rogers 115 (132); Brett Dorey 5/104 (26 overs) |
| 8/404d (115 overs); Marcus North 141 (227); Damien Wright 5/53 (32 overs) | | 4/321 (72.5 overs); Chris Rogers 147* (232); Brett Dorey 3/75 (20 overs) |

Victoria won by 6 wickets
WACA Ground, Perth
Umpires: Andrew Craig and John Ward
Player of the match: Chris Rogers (Victoria)

- Victoria won the toss and elected to field.
- Points: Victoria 6, Western Australia 0
- James Pattinson (Victoria) made his first-class debut.

28 November – 1 December
Scorecard

| (H) Queensland | v | South Australia |
| 352 (74.2 overs); Lee Carseldine 152 (174); Allan Wise 3/72 (18 overs) | | 411 (108 overs); Callum Ferguson 132 (136); Shane Watson 7/69 (21 overs) |
| 392 (87.5 overs); Shane Watson 81 (83); Daniel Christian 4/89 (19 overs) | | 7/334 (95.5 overs); Michael Klinger 137 (270); Chris Swan 3/56 (17 overs) |

South Australia won by 3 wickets
The Gabba, Brisbane
Umpires: Jeff Brookes and Paul Reiffel
Player of the match: Michael Klinger (South Australia)

- South Australia won the toss and elected to field.
- Points: South Australia 6, Queensland 0

2–4 December
Scorecard

| New South Wales | v | Tasmania (H) |
| 172 (65.2 overs); Phillip Hughes 93 (167); Gerard Denton 5/18 (9.2 overs) | | 127 (46.4 overs); Gerard Denton 48 (105); Nathan Bracken 5/28 (20 overs) |
| 173 (50.5 overs); Phillip Hughes 108 (152); Daniel Marsh 3/33 (8.5 overs) | | 7/221 (80 overs); Tim Paine 59* (102); Nathan Bracken 3/41 (22 overs) |

Tasmania won by 3 wickets
Bellerive Oval, Hobart
Umpires: Bob Parry and Simon Fry
Player of the match: Phillip Hughes (New South Wales)

- Tasmania won the toss and elected to field.
- Points: Tasmania 6, New South Wales 2
- Jonathan Wells (Tasmania) made his first-class debut.

=== Round 6 ===
15–17 December
Scorecard

| Western Australia | v | Victoria (H) |
| 211 (87.2 overs); David Bandy 66 (113); Damien Wright 4/42 (25 overs) | | 296 (69.3 overs); Andrew McDonald 60 (70); David Bandy 3/24 (7.3 overs) |
| 140 (53.2 overs); David Bandy 40 (73); Andrew McDonald 4/38 (10.2 overs) | | 2/58 (11 overs); Chris Rogers 25 (28); Steve Magoffin 2/33 (6 overs) |

Victoria won by 8 wickets
Melbourne Cricket Ground, Melbourne
Umpires: Ian Lock and Tony Ward
Player of the match: Damien Wright (Victoria)

- Victoria won the toss and elected to field.
- Points: Victoria 6, Western Australia 0
- Joshua Mangan (Western Australia) made his first-class debut.

16–19 December
Scorecard

| Queensland | v | Tasmania (H) |
| 230 (91.5 overs); Nick Kruger 41 (82); Luke Butterworth 3/44 (18 overs) | | 214 (109.1 overs); David Dawson 38 (167); Ryan Harris 4/59 (31 overs) |
| 93 (45.3 overs); Nathan Rimmington 16* (14); Luke Butterworth 5/13 (11.3 overs) | | 4/111 (28 overs); Rhett Lockyear 34 (50); James Hopes 3/13 (7 overs) |

Tasmania won by 6 wickets
Bellerive Oval, Hobart
Umpires: Bruce Oxenford and Jeff Brookes
Player of the match: Luke Butterworth (Tasmania)

- Tasmania won the toss and elected to field.
- Points: Tasmania 6, Queensland 2
- James Faulkner (Tasmania) made his first-class debut.
- Luke Butterworth (Tasmania) took his maiden five-wicket haul in first-class cricket.

18–21 December
Scorecard

| New South Wales | v | South Australia (H) |
| 6/483d (150.5 overs); Phillip Hughes 114 (224); Dan Christian 2/122 (35.5 overs) | | 3/304d (113.1 overs); Michael Klinger 125 (314); Mark Cameron 1/61 (21 overs) |
| 2/120d (20.4 overs); Ben Rohrer 57* (41); Dan Cullen 1/23 (4 overs) | | 224 (74.2 overs); Younis Khan 90 (202); Doug Bollinger 6/47 (16.2 overs) |

New South Wales won by 75 runs
Adelaide Oval, Adelaide
Umpires: Gerard Abood and Rod Tucker
Player of the match: Doug Bollinger (New South Wales)

- New South Wales won the toss and elected to bat.
- Points: New South Wales 6, South Australia 0

=== Round 7 ===
30 January – 2 February
Scorecard

| (H) New South Wales | v | Tasmania |
| 4/521d (128 overs); Phillip Hughes 151 (248); Tim Macdonald 1/69 (18 overs) | | 328 (120.5 overs); Brett Geeves 99* 113; Doug Bollinger 3/61 (26 overs) |
| 5/157d (39 overs); Phillip Hughes 82* (116); Gerard Denton 2/28 (10 overs) | | 236 (87 overs); Jonathan Wells 85 (162); Mark Cameron 4/51 (16 overs) |

New South Wales won by 114 runs
Newcastle Number 1 Sports Ground, Newcastle
Umpires: Jeff Brookes and Rod Tucker
Player of the match: Phillip Hughes (New South Wales)

- New South Wales won the toss and elected to bat.
- Points: New South Wales 6, Tasmania 0
- Alex Doolan (Tasmania) made his first-class debut.
- Brett Geeves (Tasmania) was stranded on 99 not out for the second time this season, both times after teammate Tim Macdonald was caught for the tenth wicket. Only Len Hutton, Rajeev Nayyar, and Michael Richardson had previously suffered this fate twice in first-class cricket, and Geeves is the only one of the four to have never achieved a first-class century.

30 January – 2 February
Scorecard

| (H) Queensland | v | Western Australia |
| 247 (76.2 overs); Martin Love 96 (180); Brett Dorey 6/28 (20.2 overs) | | 236 (75.1 overs); Luke Pomersbach 79 (96); Ryan Harris 4/60 (20 overs) |
| 179 (52.3 overs); Lee Carseldine 55 (82); Brett Dorey 5/60 (18.3 overs) | | 4/193 (51.4 overs); Adam Voges 80* (75); Lee Carseldine 1/28 (5.4 overs) |

Western Australia won by 6 wickets
The Gabba, Brisbane
Umpires: Bob Parry and Simon Fry
Player of the match: Brett Dorey (Western Australia)

- Western Australia won the toss and elected to field.
- Points: Western Australia 6, Queensland 2
- Drew Porter and Marcus Stoinis (Western Australia), and Scott Walter (Queensland) all made their first-class debut.

30 January – 2 February
Scorecard

| (H) Victoria | v | South Australia |
| 400 (127.2 overs); Nick Jewell 105 (157); Daniel Harris 3/45 (22 overs) | | 9/348d (101.2 overs); Graham Manou 124 (207); Andrew McDonald 6/68 (25.2 overs) |
| 2/262d (62 overs); Chris Rogers 93 (149); Dan Christian 5/62 (19 overs) | | 289 (83.3 overs); Callum Ferguson 115 (144); Bryce McGain 5/104 (28 overs) |

Victoria won by 25 runs
Melbourne Cricket Ground, Melbourne
Umpires: John Ward and Mick Martell
Player of the match: Graham Manou (South Australia)

- Victoria won the toss and elected to bat.
- Points: Victoria 6, South Australia 0
- Dan Christian (South Australia) took his maiden five-wicket haul in first-class cricket.

=== Round 8 ===
13–16 February
Scorecard

| (H) South Australia | v | Queensland |
| 6/489d (144 overs); Mark Cosgrove 133 (179); Chris Simpson 2/145 (45 overs) | | 8/300d (109 overs); Ryan Broad 84 (232); Cullen Bailey 5/90 (31 overs) |
| 7/143d (29 overs); Michael Klinger 57 (68); Chris Swan 3/28 (8 overs) | | 313 (93.5 overs); Chris Hartley 102 (166); Jake Haberfield 4/60 (16 overs) |

South Australia won by 19 runs
Adelaide Oval, Adelaide
Umpires: Jeff Brookes and Tony Ward
Player of the match: Graham Manou (South Australia)

- South Australia won the toss and elected to bat.
- Points: South Australia 6, Queensland 0
- Jake Haberfield (South Australia) made his first-class debut.

15–17 February
Scorecard

| New South Wales | v | Victoria (H) |
| 227 (93.4 overs); Greg Mail 101 (212); Clint McKay 3/29 (23 overs) | | 447 (112.2 overs); Brad Hodge 98 (122); Burt Cockley 4/65 (19.2 overs) |
| 218 (73.5 overs); Greg Mail 49 (100); John Hastings 5/61 (18.5 overs) |

Victoria won by an innings and 2 runs
Melbourne Cricket Ground, Melbourne
Umpires: John Ward and Simon Fry
Player of the match: Clint McKay (Victoria)

- New South Wales won the toss and elected to bat.
- Points: Victoria 6, New South Wales 0
- Peter Nevill (New South Wales) made his first-class debut.
- John Hastings (Victoria) took his maiden five-wicket haul in first-class cricket.

16–18 February
Scorecard

| Western Australia | v | Tasmania (H) |
| 189 (76 overs); Wes Robinson 84 (175); Luke Butterworth 4/16 (17 overs) | | 163 (75.2 overs); Daniel Marsh 64 (150); Brett Dorey 5/37 (23.2 overs) |
| 168 (70.2 overs); Steve Magoffin 59* (128); Chris Duval 4/29 (18 overs) | | 5/197 (55.1 overs); Daniel Marsh 58* (77); Steve Magoffin 3/59 (15 overs) |

Tasmania won by 5 wickets
Bellerive Oval, Hobart
Umpires: Ian Lock and Mick Martell
Player of the match: Daniel Marsh (Tasmania)

- Tasmania won the toss and elected to field.
- Points: Tasmania 6, Western Australia 2
- Luke Towers and Michael Johnson (Western Australia) both made their first-class debut.

=== Round 9 ===
26 February – 1 March
Scorecard

| New South Wales | v | Queensland (H) |
| 269 (99.2 overs); Usman Khawaja 112 (180); James Hopes 4/80 (27 overs) | | 7/547d (140 overs); Martin Love 219 (353); Grant Lambert 3/143 (31 overs) |
| 149 (62.1 overs); Usman Khawaja 41 (98); James Hopes 5/34 (22 overs) |

Queensland won by an innings and 129 runs
The Gabba, Brisbane
Umpires: Brian Jerling and Ian Lock
Player of the match: Martin Love (Queensland)

- New South Wales won the toss and elected to field.
- Points: Queensland 6, New South Wales 0
- Usman Khawaja (Queensland) scored his maiden century in first-class cricket.

26 February – 1 March
Scorecard

| Victoria | v | Tasmania (H) |
| 535 (143.2 overs); Matthew Wade 100 (173); Jason Krejza 3/107 (32.2 overs) | | 300 (112.5 overs); George Bailey 130 (241); Darren Pattinson 5/38 (22 overs) |
| 158 (58 overs); Matthew Wade 46 (89); Brett Geeves 6/47 (22 overs) | | 5/155 (44 overs); Alex Doolan 42 (80); John Hastings 3/46 (13 overs) |

Match drawn
Bellerive Oval, Hobart
Umpires: Bruce Oxenford and Simon Fry
Player of the match: Matthew Wade (Victoria)

- Tasmania won the toss and elected to field.
- Points: Victoria 2, Tasmania 0
- Steve Gilmour (Victoria) made his first-class debut.
- Matthew Wade (Victoria) scored his maiden century in first-class cricket.

26 February – 1 March
Scorecard

| (H) Western Australia | v | South Australia |
| 243 (79 overs); Luke Pomersbach 51 (51); Mark Cleary 4/70 (26 overs) | | 9/457d (149.2 overs); Daniel Harris 124 (211); Adam Voges 4/97 (34.2 overs) |
| 228 (79.4 overs); Luke Pomersbach 57 (117); Dan Christian 4/52 (15 overs) | | 1/17 (1.5 overs); James Smith 15 (12); Drew Porter 1/4 (1 over) |

South Australia won by 9 wickets
WACA Ground, Perth
Umpires: Bob Parry and Paul Reiffel
Player of the match: Daniel Harris (South Australia)

- South Australia won the toss and elected to field.
- Points: South Australia 6, Western Australia 0

=== Round 10 ===
5–8 March
Scorecard

| (H) Queensland | v | Victoria |
| 302 (84.2 overs); Shane Watson 145 (167); John Hastings 4/56 (21 overs) | | 8/806d (236 overs); Brad Hodge 261 (394); Chris Simpson 4/194 (65 overs) |
| 1/187 (45 overs); Ryan Broad 100* (130); Jon Holland 1/75 (16 overs) |

Match drawn
The Gabba, Brisbane
Umpires: Ian Lock and Paul Reiffel
Player of the match: Brad Hodge (Victoria)

- Queensland won the toss and elected to bat.
- Points: Victoria 2, Queensland 0

5–8 March
Scorecard

| Western Australia | v | New South Wales (H) |
| 210 (75.1 overs); Aaron Heal 66 (94); Burt Cockley 4/37 (18 overs) | | 8/526d (156 overs); Usman Khawaja 172 (258); David Bandy 2/36 (17 overs) |
| 4/248 (103.2 overs); David Bandy 87 (159); Mitchell Starc 1/32 (21 overs) |

Match drawn
Sydney Cricket Ground, Sydney
Umpires: Bruce Oxenford and John Ward
Player of the match: Usman Khawaja (New South Wales)

- Western Australia won the toss and elected to bat.
- Points: New South Wales 2, Western Australia 0
- David Warner and Mitchell Starc (New South Wales) both made their first-class debut.

5–8 March
Scorecard

| Tasmania | v | South Australia (H) |
| 301 (106.1 overs); George Bailey 123 (231); Mark Cleary 7/91 (34.1 overs) | | 253 (86.4 overs); Callum Ferguson 54 (105); Luke Butterworth 5/43 (14.4 overs) |
| 9/289d (93 overs); Luke Butterworth 77 (122); Daniel Christian 4/76 (18 overs) | | 5/338 (79.1 overs); Mark Cosgrove 118 (141); Jeremy Smith 1/33 (8 overs) |

South Australia won by 5 wickets
Adelaide Oval, Adelaide
Umpires: Bob Parry and Brian Jerling
Player of the match: Mark Cleary (South Australia)

- Tasmania won the toss and elected to bat.
- Points: South Australia 6, Tasmania 2
- Jeremy Smith (Tasmania) made his first-class debut.

== Final ==
13–17 March
Scorecard

| (H) Victoria | v | Queensland |
| 510 (166 overs); Cameron White 135 (282); Andrew Symonds 4/48 (24 overs) | | 200 (61 overs); Martin Love 41 (58); Dirk Nannes 4/65 (17 overs) |
| 5/282d (51 overs); Brad Hodge 90 (116); Chris Simpson 2/49 (13 overs) | | 1/221 (52 overs); Ryan Broad 109 (132); Shane Harwood 1/47 (8 overs) |

Match drawn
Junction Oval, Melbourne
Umpires: Bruce Oxenford and Paul Reiffel
Player of the match: Cameron White (Victoria)

- Victoria won the toss and elected to bat.
- Victoria win the Sheffield Shield by virtue of finishing top of the points table.

== Statistics ==
=== Most Runs ===
| Player | Team | Matches | Innings | Runs | Average | HS | 100s | 50s |
|---|---|---|---|---|---|---|---|---|
| (Australia) Michael Klinger | South Australia | 10 | 19 | 1203 | 70.76 | 255 | 4 | 4 |
| (Australia) Chris Rogers | Victoria | 11 | 19 | 1195 | 74.68 | 159 | 5 | 5 |
| (Australia) Phil Hughes | New South Wales | 7 | 13 | 891 | 74.25 | 198 | 4 | 3 |

=== Most Wickets ===
| Player | Team | Matches | Overs | Wickets | Average | BBI | 5W |
|---|---|---|---|---|---|---|---|
| (Australia) Brett Dorey | Western Australia | 10 | 365.3 | 42 | 24.11 | 6/28 | 4 |
| (Australia) Dirk Nannes | Victoria | 8 | 235.0 | 38 | 21.00 | 7/50 | 1 |
| (Australia) Steve Magoffin | Western Australia | 9 | 331.3 | 38 | 22.86 | 6/66 | 1 |

== See also ==
- 2008–09 Australian cricket season
