= 2009–10 Ford Ranger One Day Cup season =

2009–10 Ford Ranger One Day Cup
- Administrator: Cricket Australia
- Cricket format: Limited overs cricket
- Tournament format: Double round-robin
- Champions: Tasmania (4th title)
- Participants: 6
- Matches: 31
- Player of the series: Brad Hodge (Victoria)
- Most runs: Brad Hodge (Victoria) (622)
- Most wickets: Xavier Doherty (Tasmania) (20)

The 2009–10 Ford Ranger One Day Cup was the 40th season of official List A domestic cricket in Australia. The season began on 11 October 2009 when Western Australia played Queensland.

== Points Table ==
The top two teams after all rounds are played compete in the Ford Ranger One Day Cup final. The match is contested at the home ground of the side that finishes first. (For an explanation of how points are awarded, see Ford Ranger One Day Cup – Points system).

Pos	Team	Pld	W	L	T	NR	BP	Pts	NRR	For	Against
1	Victoria	10	6	4	0	0	1	25	0.187	2716/484.4	2646/488.3
2	Tasmania	10	6	4	0	0	0	24	0.138	2337/448.2	2357/464.3
3	Queensland	10	5	5	0	0	1	21	0.174	2396/473	2369/484.2
4	New South Wales	10	5	5	0	0	1	21	−0.108	2305/469.3	2425/483.2
5	Western Australia	10	4	6	0	0	2	18	−0.079	2224/475	2194/460.5
6	South Australia	10	4	6	0	0	1	17	−0.353	2386/454.5	2373/423.5

== Teams ==
Club	Home ground	Captain
New South Wales Blues	Sydney Cricket Ground	Simon Katich
Queensland Bulls	Brisbane Cricket Ground	Chris Simpson
Southern Redbacks	Adelaide Oval	Graham Manou
Tasmanian Tigers	Bellerive Oval	George Bailey
Victorian Bushrangers	Melbourne Cricket Ground	Cameron White
Western Warriors	WACA Ground	Marcus North

== Fixture ==
=== October ===
11 October 2009
Scorecard

Queensland; 9/161 (50 overs)	v	Western Australia (H); 8/162 (49.3 overs)
Lee Carseldine 54 (81); Brett Dorey 3/29 (10 overs)		Ashley Noffke 43 (74); Ben Laughlin 3/33 (10 overs)

Western Australia won by 2 wickets
WACA Ground, Perth
Umpires: Mick Martell and Paul Wilson
Player of the match: Ashley Noffke

18 October 2009
Scorecard

(H) South Australia; 9/249 (50 overs)	v	Tasmania; 3/250 (42.1 overs)
Daniel Harris 68 (98); Xavier Doherty 3/46 (10 overs)		Michael Dighton 69 (57); Daniel Christian 1/34 (7.1 overs)

Tasmania won by 7 wickets
Adelaide Oval, Adelaide
Umpires: Gerard Abood and Steve Davis
Player of the match: Michael Dighton

21 October 2009
Scorecard

South Australia; 184 (46.3 overs)	v	Queensland (H); 4/187 (37 overs)
Tom Cooper 54 (69); Scott Walter 4/34 (10 overs)		Ryan Broad 60 (90); Mark Cosgrove 2/27 (7 overs)

Queensland won by 6 wickets
Brisbane Cricket Ground, Brisbane
Umpires: Bob Parry and John Ward
Player of the match: Scott Walter

- Queensland earned 1 bonus point.

24 October 2009
Scorecard

Western Australia; 224 (48.2 overs)	v	Queensland (H); 4/198 (36 overs)
Theo Doropoulos 63 (63); Nathan Rimmington 3/40 (9.2 overs)		Chris Hartley 70 (95); Ashley Noffke 2/37 (7 overs)

Queensland won by 6 wickets (D/L Method)
Brisbane Cricket Ground, Brisbane
Umpires: Bruce Oxenford and Bob Parry
Player of the match: Chris Hartley

- Rain delay reduced Queensland target to 197 runs from 37 overs

30 October 2009
Scorecard

(H) Queensland; 9/233 (50 overs)	v	Tasmania; 209 (48.3 overs)
Lee Carseldine 73 (91); Xavier Doherty 3/25 (10 overs)		George Bailey 87 (115); Nathan Rimmington 3/25 (9.3 overs)

Queensland won by 24 runs
Brisbane Cricket Ground, Brisbane
Umpires: Paul Reiffel and Tony Ward
Player of the match: Lee Carseldine

=== November ===
1 November 2009
Scorecard

Western Australia; 179 (44.1 overs)	v	New South Wales (H); 3/184 (36.4 overs)
Wes Robinson 78 (91); Burt Cockley 4/39 (8.1 overs)		Phillip Hughes 72 (110); Ashley Noffke 2/34 (10 overs)

New South Wales won by 7 wickets
North Sydney Oval, Sydney
Umpires: Jeff Brookes and Bob Parry
Player of the match: Burt Cockley

- New South Wales earned 1 bonus point.

4 November 2009
Scorecard

(H) South Australia; 9/247 (50 overs)	v	Victoria; 5/248 (42.4 overs)
Cameron Borgas 90 (123); Darren Pattinson 3/34 (10 overs)		Brad Hodge 114 (112); Shaun Tait 3/57 (10 overs)

Victoria won by 5 wickets
Adelaide Oval, Adelaide
Umpires: Geoff Joshua and Rod Tucker
Player of the match: Brad Hodge

7 November 2009
Scorecard

Tasmania; 7/300 (50 overs)	v	Victoria (H); 6/301 (49.2 overs)
Rhett Lockyear 111 (98); Shane Harwood 3/68 (10 overs)		Aaron Finch 87 (87); Brendan Drew 2/55 (10 overs)

Victoria won by 4 wickets
Melbourne Cricket Ground, Melbourne
Umpires: Geoff Joshua and Paul Reiffel
Player of the match: Aaron Finch

14 November 2009
Scorecard

Queensland; 6/266 (50 overs)	v	South Australia; 236 (49 overs)
Nathan Reardon 83 (125); Jake Haberfield 3/38 (10 overs)		Michael Klinger 76 (120); Alister McDermott 3/39 (10 overs)

Queensland won by 30 runs
Traeger Park, Alice Springs
Umpires: Mick Martell and Tony Ward

14 November 2009
Scorecard

(H) Victoria; 5/304 (50 overs)	v	Western Australia; 213 (44 overs)
Brad Hodge 113 (126); Brett Dorey 2/80 (9 overs)		Luke Ronchi 58 (73); John Hastings 4/38 (10 overs)

Victoria won by 91 runs
Melbourne Cricket Ground, Melbourne
Umpires: Ian Lock and Paul Reiffel
Player of the match: Brad Hodge

- Victoria earned 1 bonus point.

15 November 2009
Scorecard

(H) New South Wales; 8/271 (50 overs)	v	Tasmania; 4/272 (46 overs)
Steve Smith 81 (58); Brendan Drew 3/56 (10 overs)		George Bailey 81 (76); Stuart Clark 2/64 (10 overs)

Tasmania won by 6 wickets
North Sydney Oval, Sydney
Umpires: Gerard Abood and Rod Tucker
Player of the match: Steve Smith

25 November 2009
Scorecard

(H) Western Australia; 3/309 (50 overs)	v	New South Wales; 180 (38 overs)
Shaun Marsh 116 (141); Josh Hazlewood 1/40 (7 overs)		Moises Henriques 59 (72); Aaron Heal 4/58 (9 overs)

Western Australia won by 129 runs
WACA Ground, Perth
Umpires: Ian Lock and Bruce Oxenford
Player of the match: Shaun Marsh

- Western Australia earned 1 bonus point.

29 November 2009
Scorecard

(H) Tasmania; 7/130 (17 overs)	v	South Australia; 3/131 (15.1 overs)
George Bailey 35 (29); Jake Haberfield 3/22 (3 overs)		Tom Cooper 78 (43); Gerard Denton 2/20 (3 overs)

South Australia won by 7 wickets
Bellerive Oval, Hobart
Umpires: Steven John and John Ward
Player of the match: Tom Cooper

- Rain delayed the start, with the match reduced to 17 overs per side.

=== December ===
2 December 2009
Scorecard

Queensland; 5/261 (50 overs)	v	Victoria (H); 241 (48.4 overs)
Craig Philipson 85 (79); James Pattinson 2/53 (8 overs)		Matthew Wade 67 (62); Ben Laughlin 3/43 (8.4 overs)

Queensland won by 20 runs
Melbourne Cricket Ground, Melbourne
Umpires: Ashley Barrow and Steve Davis
Player of the match: Chris Simpson

5 December 2009
Scorecard

New South Wales; 177 (40.3 overs)	v	Tasmania (H); 7/178 (45 overs)
Moises Henriques 37 (58); Gerard Denton 3/19 (5 overs)		George Bailey 74* (89); Steve Smith 3/43 (10 overs)

Tasmania won by 3 wickets
NTCA Ground, Launceston
Umpires: Steven John and Ian Lock
Player of the match: George Bailey

5 December 2009
Scorecard

Victoria; 8/277 (50 overs)	v	Western Australia (H); 5/279 (49.3 overs)
Cameron White 60 (80); Ashley Noffke 3/43 (10 overs)		Adam Voges 64 (71); John Hastings 3/42 (10 overs)

Western Australia won by 5 wickets
Hands Memorial Oval, Bunbury
Umpires: Mick Martell and Paul Wilson
Player of the match: Luke Ronchi

9 December 2009
Scorecard

(H) Queensland; 258 (49.2 overs)	v	New South Wales; 6/259 (47.5 overs)
Nick Kruger 67 (103); Josh Hazlewood 2/38 (8.2 overs)		Steve Smith 75* (84); Chris Swan 2/36 (8 overs)

New South Wales won by 4 wickets
Brisbane Cricket Ground, Brisbane
Umpires: Simon Fry and Paul Reiffel
Player of the match: Steve Smith

13 December 2009
Scorecard

Western Australia; 9/193 (50 overs)	v	Tasmania (H); 6/194 (48.2 overs)
Mitchell Marsh 92 (117); Gerard Denton 3/27 (7 overs)		Luke Butterworth 63* (86); Nathan Coulter-Nile 2/27 (9 overs)

Tasmania won by 4 wickets
Bellerive Oval, Hobart
Umpires: Jeff Brookes and Tony Ward
Player of the match: Luke Butterworth

15 December 2009
Scorecard

South Australia; 7/339 (50 overs)	v	Victoria (H); 290 (43.5 overs)
Mark Cosgrove 104 (81); James Pattinson 3/55 (10 overs)		Chris Rogers 140 (116); Matthew Weeks 4/54 (8.5 overs)

South Australia won by 49 runs
Melbourne Cricket Ground, Melbourne
Umpires: Geoff Joshua and Bob Parry
Player of the match: Mark Cosgrove

23 December 2009
Scorecard

Victoria; 188 (46.4 overs)	v	New South Wales (H); 6/189 (45 overs)
John Hastings 38 (49); Mitchell Starc 3/36 (7.4 overs)		Usman Khawaja 56 (104); James Pattinson 6/48 (10 overs)

New South Wales won by 4 wickets
Sydney Cricket Ground, Sydney
Umpires: Gerard Abood and Bruce Oxenford
Player of the match: James Pattinson

=== Mid Season Break ===
There is a break in the regular schedule of List A games to allow for the 2009–10 KFC Twenty20 Big Bash competition.

=== January ===
26 January 2010
Scorecard

(H) New South Wales; 294 (50 overs)	v	South Australia; 7/295 (49.4 overs)
Steve Smith 92 (106); Gary Putland 3/53 (10 overs)		Michael Klinger 124 (133); Mitchell Starc 3/67 (10 overs)

South Australia won by 3 wickets
North Dalton Park, Wollongong
Umpires: Jeff Brookes and John Ward
Player of the match: Michael Klinger

27 January 2010
Scorecard

Victoria; 7/326 (50 overs)	v	Tasmania (H); 9/306 (50 overs)
Brad Hodge 139 (157); Gerard Denton 2/64 (10 overs)		Travis Birt 97 (110); John Hastings 3/62 (10 overs)

Victoria won by 20 runs
Bellerive Oval, Hobart
Umpires: Steven John and Ian Lock
Player of the match: Brad Hodge

30 January 2010
Scorecard

Western Australia; 9/228 (50 overs)	v	South Australia (H); 4/229 (40 overs)
Marcus North 85* (102); Daniel Christian 4/32 (10 overs)		Michael Klinger 113 (123); Nathan Coulter-Nile 2/38 (7 overs)

South Australia won by 6 wickets
Adelaide Oval, Adelaide
Umpires: Simon Fry and Tony Ward
Player of the match: Daniel Christian

- South Australia earned 1 bonus point.

=== February ===
3 February 2010
Scorecard

(H) New South Wales; 4/293 (50 overs)	v	Queensland; 9/287 (50 overs)
Phil Jaques 171* (143); Ben Cutting 3/45 (9 overs)		Craig Philipson 100 (112); Trent Copeland 3/70 (10 overs)

New South Wales won by 6 runs
Sydney Cricket Ground, Sydney
Umpires: Gerard Abood and Rod Tucker
Player of the match: Phil Jaques

6 February 2010
Scorecard

South Australia; 9/233 (50 overs)	v	Western Australia (H); 5/234 (39 overs)
Michael Klinger 51 (71); Ben Edmondson 3/45 (10 overs)		Luke Pomersbach 104 (102); Gary Putland 2/37 (7 overs)

Western Australia won by 5 wickets
WACA Ground, Perth
Umpires: Ian Lock and Paul Wilson
Player of the match: Luke Pomersbach

- Western Australia were awarded a bonus point.

10 February 2010
Scorecard

New South Wales; 224 (49.3 overs)	v	Victoria (H); 5/216 (42.4 overs)
Phil Jaques 60 (65); Bryce McGain 3/37 (10 overs)		Matthew Wade 50 (68); Nathan Bracken 2/34 (9 overs)

Victoria won by 5 wickets (D/L Method)
Melbourne Cricket Ground, Melbourne
Umpires: Geoff Joshua and Mick Martell
Player of the match: Bryce McGain

- Rain interrupted play during the 13th over of Victorias innings. A revised target of 213 runs off 43 overs was set using the Duckworth–Lewis method.

13 February 2010
Scorecard

(H) Tasmania; 5/264 (50 overs)	v	Queensland; 245 (49.3 overs)
George Bailey 112* (108); Ben Laughlin 2/62 (10 overs)		Nathan Reardon 79 (84); Xavier Doherty 4/28 (10 overs)

Tasmania won by 19 runs
Bellerive Oval, Hobart
Umpires: Steven John and Bob Parry
Player of the match: George Bailey

17 February 2010
Scorecard

(H) Western Australia; 7/231 (50 overs)	v	Tasmania; 5/234 (49.5 overs)
Luke Ronchi 55 (85); Xavier Doherty 4/32 (10 overs)		Travis Birt 93* (99); Marcus North 3/38 (10 overs)

Tasmania won by 5 wickets
WACA Ground, Perth
Umpires: Geoff Joshua and Bob Parry
Player of the match: Travis Birt

20 February 2010
Scorecard

Victoria; 4/325 (50 overs)	v	Queensland (H); 300 (48.1 overs)
Brad Hodge 136* (118); Nathan Rimmington 1/42 (10 overs)		Lee Carseldine 105 (98); Andrew McDonald 4/50 (10 overs)

Victoria won by 25 runs
Brisbane Cricket Ground, Brisbane
Umpires: Simon Fry and Norm McNamara
Player of the match: Brad Hodge

24 February 2010
Scorecard

South Australia; 7/243 (50 overs)	v	New South Wales; 5/246 (46 overs)
Daniel Harris 63 (73); Nathan Bracken 3/48 (10 overs)		Ben Rohrer 63 (83); Jake Haberfield 2/49 (8 overs)

New South Wales won by 5 wickets
Adelaide Oval, Adelaide
Umpires: Jeff Brookes and Tony Ward
Player of the match: Nathan Bracken

== Final ==
28 February 2010
Scorecard

Tasmania; 6/304 (50 overs)	v	Victoria (H); 194 (42.1 overs)
Tim Paine 100 (118); Andrew McDonald 3/60 (10 overs)		Andrew McDonald 64 (80); Gerard Denton 5/45 (9 overs)

Tasmania won by 110 runs
Melbourne Cricket Ground, Melbourne
Umpires: Bruce Oxenford, Paul Reiffel and
Simon Fry (TV Umpire)
Player of the match: Tim Paine

== Statistics ==
=== Most Runs ===
Player	Matches	Innings	Runs	Balls	Strike rate	Average	HS	100s	50s
Brad Hodge (Vic)	11	11	622	665	93.53	69.11	139	4	0
George Bailey (Tas)	11	11	538	637	84.45	59.77	112*	1	5
Michael Klinger (SA)	9	9	502	621	80.83	56.77	124	2	3
Lee Carseldine (Qld)	10	10	463	589	78.60	46.30	105	1	4
Travis Birt (Tas)	10	10	445	450	98.88	63.57	97	0	5
Nathan Reardon (Qld)	10	10	393	468	83.97	39.30	83	0	4

Last updated 2 March 2010

=== Most Wickets ===
Player	Matches	Overs	Wickets	Economy rate	Average	Strike rate	BBI	5W
Xavier Doherty (Tas)	11	89.1	20	4.56	20.35	26.7	4/28	0
John Hastings (Vic)	11	103.3	19	5.45	29.73	32.6	4/38	0
Gerard Denton (Tas)	7	54	16	4.96	16.75	20.2	5/45	1
Nathan Rimmington (Qld)	10	93.2	15	4.36	27.13	37.3	3/25	0
Jake Haberfield (SA)	10	76.4	15	5.36	27.40	30.6	3/22	0
Ben Cutting (Qld)	10	91	15	4.85	29.46	36.4	3/30	0

Last updated 3 March 2010
