= 2009–10 Twenty20 Big Bash =

Twenty20 Big Bash 2009–10
- Administrator: Cricket Australia
- Cricket format: Twenty20
- Tournament format: Single round-robin then knockout
- Champions: Victorian Bushrangers (4th title)
- Participants: 6
- Matches: 17
- Attendance: 308,590 (18,152 per match)
- Player of the series: David Warner (NSW) and Kieron Pollard (SA)
- Most runs: Kieron Pollard (SA) 190 (131 balls)
- Most wickets: John Hastings (Vic) 10 (28 overs, 207 runs)

The 2009–10 KFC Twenty20 Big Bash is the fifth season of the KFC Twenty20 Big Bash, the official Twenty20 domestic cricket competition in Australia. Six teams representing six states in Australia are participating in the competition. The competition began on 28 December 2009 when the Queensland Bulls played the Victorian Bushrangers at the Brisbane Cricket Ground (Gabba).

This season comprised 15 regular matches, a preliminary final and a final, the same as it was in the 2008–09 season.

== Table ==
Teams received 2 points for a win, 1 for a tie or no result, and 0 for a loss. At the end of the regular matches the teams ranked two and three play each other in the preliminary final at the home venue of the team ranked two. The winner of the preliminary final earns the right to play the first placed team in the final at the home venue of the first placed team. In the event of several teams finishing with the same number of points, standings are determined by most wins, then net run rate (NRR).

The two teams that made the final qualified for the 2010 Champions League Twenty20.

Pos	Team	Pld	W	L	T	NR	Pts	NRR
1	Southern Redbacks	5	4	1	0	0	8	0.740
2	Queensland Bulls	5	3	2	0	0	6	1.003
3	Victorian Bushrangers	5	3	2	0	0	6	−0.869
4	Western Australia	5	2	3	0	0	4	0.680
5	New South Wales Blues	5	2	3	0	0	4	−0.764
6	Tasmanian Tigers	5	1	4	0	0	2	−0.728

== Teams ==
Club	Home Ground	Captain	International Players
New South Wales Blues	Stadium Australia, Sydney	David Warner	Dwayne Smith
Queensland Bulls	Brisbane Cricket Ground	James Hopes	Daniel Vettori
Southern Redbacks	Adelaide Oval	Daniel Harris	Kieron Pollard, Shahid Afridi
Tasmanian Tigers	Bellerive Oval, Hobart	George Bailey	Naved-ul-Hasan
Victorian Bushrangers	Melbourne Cricket Ground	Cameron White	Ross Taylor, Dwayne Bravo
Western Warriors	WACA Ground, Perth	Adam Voges	Chris Gayle

== Fixtures ==
=== Round 1 ===
28 December 2009
18:45
Scorecard

Victoria; 8/157 (20 overs)	v	Queensland (H); 6/121 (16 overs)
Ross Taylor 58 (36); Dwayne Bravo 36 (18); Ryan Harris 3/23 (4 overs)		Craig Philipson 33 (27); James Hopes 22 (15); John Hastings 3/21 (4 overs)

Victoria won by 3 runs (D/L method).
Brisbane Cricket Ground, Brisbane
Attendance: 7,748
Umpires: Gerard Abood and Bruce Oxenford
Player of the match: Ross Taylor

- Rain stopped the Queensland innings at 16 overs with a par score of 124.

29 December 2009
17:15
Scorecard

South Australia; 6/196 (20 overs)	v	Western Australia (H); 167 (19 overs)
Kieron Pollard 45 (31); Mark Cosgrove 42 (29); Aaron Heal 2/39 (4 overs)		Adam Voges 45 (25); Chris Gayle 44 (24); Shahid Afridi 4/19 (4 overs)

South Australia won by 29 runs
WACA Ground, Perth
Attendance: 17,308 (house full)
Umpires: Mick Martell and Paul Wilson
Player of the match: Shahid Afridi

30 December 2009
18:45
Scorecard

New South Wales; 4/194 (20 overs)	v	Tasmania (H); 163 (19 overs)
Phillip Hughes 71* (50); David Warner 67 (24); Naved-ul-Hasan 2/41 (4 overs)		Tim Paine 48 (18); Rhett Lockyear 25 (13); Steve Smith 4/13 (4 overs)

New South Wales won by 31 runs
Bellerive Oval, Hobart
Attendance: 6,515
Umpires: Tony Ward and John Ward
Player of the match: David Warner

=== Round 2 ===
1 January 2010
18:45
Scorecard

(H) Tasmania; 8/167 (20 overs)	v	Western Australia; 150 (18.5 overs)
Travis Birt 54 (42); Naved-ul-Hasan 47 (27); Aaron Heal 2/15 (4 overs)		Adam Voges 31 (20); Luke Ronchi 27 (17); Naved-ul-Hasan 3/29 (3.5 overs)

Tasmania won by 17 runs
Bellerive Oval, Hobart
Attendance: 6,126
Umpires: Tony Ward and John Ward
Player of the match: Naved-ul-Hasan

2 January 2010
18:45
Scorecard

New South Wales; 6/178 (20 overs)	v	Victoria (H); 4/179 (19.4 overs)
David Warner 40 (20); Steve Smith 35 (26); Dwayne Bravo 3/32 (4 overs)		Matthew Wade 41 (24); Brad Hodge 40 (36); Dwayne Smith 1/24 (3.4 overs)

Victoria won by 6 wickets
Melbourne Cricket Ground, Melbourne
Attendance: 28,052
Umpires: Geoff Joshua and Bob Parry
Player of the match: Dwayne Bravo

3 January 2010
18:45
Scorecard

Queensland; 4/156 (20 overs)	v	South Australia (H); 6/160 (19 overs)
James Hopes 63 (45); Andrew Symonds 27 (23); Shahid Afridi 1/25 (4 overs)		Daniel Harris 34 (19); Mark Cosgrove 43* (40); Nathan Rimmington 2/30 (4 overs); Chris Simpson 2/30 (4 overs)

South Australia won by 4 wickets
Adelaide Oval, Adelaide
Attendance: 17,500 (house full)
Umpires: Robert Brooks and Rod Tucker
Player of the match: Shahid Afridi

=== Round 3 ===
5 January 2010
Scorecard

(H) Western Australia; 1/198 (20 overs)	v	New South Wales; 71 (16.2 overs)
Shaun Marsh 108* (58); Wes Robinson 54 (55); Mitchell Starc 1/25 (3 overs)		Phil Jaques 16 (17); Steve Smith 14 (15); Mitchell Marsh 4/6 (2.2 overs)

Western Australia won by 127 runs
WACA Ground, Perth
Attendance: 13,888
Umpires: Ian Lock and Mick Martell
Player of the match: Shaun Marsh

7 January 2010
Scorecard

(H) South Australia; 7/202 (20 overs)	v	Victoria; 111 (14 overs)
Kieron Pollard 52 (22); Daniel Harris 48 (33); John Hastings 2/30 (4 overs)		Aaron Finch 48 (38); Clint McKay 15 (8); Shaun Tait 3/12 (2 overs); Kieron Pollard 2/8 (1 over)

South Australia won by 91 runs
Adelaide Oval, Adelaide
Attendance: 16,460 (house full)
Umpires: Simon Fry and Geoff Joshua
Player of the match: Shaun Tait

8 January 2010
Scorecard

(H) Queensland; 153 (20 overs)	v	Tasmania; 9/144 (20 overs)
James Hopes 50 (31); Lee Carseldine 25 (17); Brett Geeves 4/30 (4 overs); Gerard Denton 2/30 (4 overs)		Tim Paine 39 (20); John Rogers 27 (19); James Hopes 3/25 (4 overs); Ryan Harris 2/26 (4 overs)

Queensland won by 9 runs
Brisbane Cricket Ground, Brisbane
Attendance: 16,494
Umpires: Paul Reiffel and Rod Tucker
Player of the match: James Hopes

=== Round 4 ===
10 January 2010
17:15
Scorecard

(H) Western Australia; 5/152 (20 overs)	v	Victoria; 8/128 (20 overs)
Wes Robinson 34 (20); Luke Pomersbach 32 (19); Dirk Nannes 2/15 (4 overs)		Andrew McDonald 32 (25); Cameron White 31 (28); Brad Knowles 3/20 (4 overs)

Western Australia won by 24 runs
WACA Ground, Perth
Attendance: 17,612 (house full)
Umpires: Jeff Brookes and Mick Martell
Player of the match: Ashley Noffke

12 January 2010
18:45
Scorecard

(H) South Australia; 131 (18 overs)	v	Tasmania; 9/108 (20 overs)
Graham Manou 33 (17); Kieron Pollard 27 (23); Naved-ul-Hasan 3/15 (3 overs); James Faulkner 2/11 (3 overs)		Travis Birt 22 (28); Brett Geeves 18 (14); Aaron O'Brien 3/15 (4 overs); Shaun Tait 3/27 (4 overs)

South Australia won by 23 runs
Adelaide Oval, Adelaide
Attendance: 14,440
Umpires: Simon Fry and Paul Wilson
Player of the match: Aaron O'Brien

13 January 2010
19:15
Scorecard

Queensland; 4/110 (9 overs)	v	New South Wales (H); 7/56 (9 overs)
Andrew Symonds 38* (21); Chris Simpson 34 (14); Dwayne Smith 2/18 (2 overs); Mitchell Starc 1/16 (2 overs)		Daniel Smith 20* (14); Dominic Thornely 15* (15); Nathan Rimmington 3/13 (2 overs); Daniel Vettori 1/7 (2 overs)

Queensland won by 54 runs
Stadium Australia, Sydney
Attendance: 29,743
Umpires: Gerard Abood and Paul Reiffel
Player of the match: Nathan Rimmington

- Rain reduced play to 9 overs per side.

=== Round 5 ===
15 January 2010
18:45
Scorecard

Tasmania; 8/160 (20 overs)	v	Victoria (H); 1/161 (16.5 overs)
Tim Paine 61 (32); Ed Cowan 23 (19); Clinton McKay 2/24 (4 overs)		Brad Hodge 90 (56); Aaron Finch 58 (39); Xavier Doherty 1/30 (4 overs)

Victoria won by 9 wickets
Melbourne Cricket Ground, Melbourne
Attendance: 43,125
Umpires: Bob Parry and John Ward
Player of the match: Brad Hodge

16 January 2010
18:45
Scorecard

(H) Queensland; 7/203 (20 overs)	v	Western Australia; 5/166 (20 overs)
Chris Simpson 76 (38); Craig Philipson 46* (28); Brad Knowles 2/48 (4 overs); Aaron Heal 1/28 (4 overs)		Wes Robinson 51 (40); Luke Ronchi 34 (27); Ben Cutting 2/30 (4 overs); James Hopes 2/30 (4 overs)

Queensland won by 37 runs
Brisbane Cricket Ground, Brisbane
Attendance: 17,645
Umpires: Simon Fry and Paul Reiffel
Player of the match: Chris Simpson

17 January 2010
19:15
Scorecard

South Australia; 81 (14.4 overs)	v	New South Wales (H); 2/82 (8.4 overs)
Kieron Pollard 13 (15); Daniel Harris 11 (6); Grant Lambert 3/20 (3 overs); Dwayne Smith 2/4 (2 overs)		David Warner 54 (21); Phillip Hughes 25 (27); Gary Putland 1/18 (2.4 overs); Shahid Afridi 1/20 (2 overs)

New South Wales won by 8 wickets
Stadium Australia, Sydney
Attendance: 26,406
Umpires: Gerard Abood and Ian Lock
Player of the match: David Warner

== Knockout stage ==
=== Preliminary final ===
19 January 2010
18:45
Scorecard

(H) Queensland; 5/149 (20 overs)	v	Victoria; 4/150 (18.5 overs)
Ben Dunk 70* (40); James Hopes 44* (55); Dirk Nannes 2/26 (4 overs); Andrew McDonald 1/22 (4 overs)		David Hussey 60* (39); Brad Hodge 30 (28); Ben Cutting 2/34 (4 overs); Nathan Rimmington 1/14 (2 overs)

Victoria won by 6 wickets
Brisbane Cricket Ground, Brisbane
Attendance: 11,806
Umpires: Paul Reiffel and Rod Tucker
Player of the match: David Hussey

=== Final ===
23 January 2010
18:45
Scorecard

Victoria; 7/166 (20 overs)	v	South Australia (H); 9/118 (20 overs)
Aaron Finch 48 (34); Aiden Blizzard 42* (19); Aaron O'Brien 3/26 (4 overs); Gary Putland 1/27 (4 overs)		Kieron Pollard 44 (33); Mark Cosgrove 22 (24); Andrew McDonald 3/21 (4 overs); James Pattinson 3/27 (4 overs)

Victoria won by 48 runs
Adelaide Oval, Adelaide
Attendance: 17,722 (house full)
Umpires: Simon Fry and Paul Reiffel
Player of the match: Aiden Blizzard

== Statistics ==
=== Highest team totals ===
The following table lists the six highest team scores during this season.

Team	Total	Opponent	Ground
Queensland	7/203	Western Australia	Brisbane Cricket Ground
South Australia	7/202	Victoria	Adelaide Oval
Western Australia	1/198	New South Wales	WACA Ground
South Australia	6/196	Western Australia	WACA Ground
New South Wales	4/194	Tasmania	Bellerive Oval
Victoria	4/179	New South Wales	Melbourne Cricket Ground

Last Updated 23 January 2010.

=== Most runs ===
The top five highest run scorers (total runs) in the season are included in this table.

Player	Team	Runs	Inns	Avg	S/R	HS	100s	50s
Kieron Pollard	South Australia	190	6	31.66	145.03	52	0	1
Aaron Finch	Victoria	189	5	47.25	143.18	58*	0	1
James Hopes	Queensland	185	6	37.00	120.91	63	0	2
Brad Hodge	Victoria	181	7	25.85	115.28	90	0	1
Shaun Marsh	Western Australia	175	5	43.75	133.58	108*	1	1

Last Updated 23 January 2010.

=== Highest scores ===
This table contains the top five highest scores of the season made by a batsman in a single innings.

Player	Team	Score	Balls	4s	6s	Opponent	Ground
Shaun Marsh	Western Australia	108*	58	6	6	New South Wales	WACA Ground
Brad Hodge	Victoria	90	56	6	5	Tasmania	Melbourne Cricket Ground
Chris Simpson	Queensland	76	38	11	3	Western Australia	Brisbane Cricket Ground
Phillip Hughes	New South Wales	71*	50	6	1	Tasmania	Bellerive Oval
Ben Dunk	Queensland	70*	40	6	2	Victoria	Brisbane Cricket Ground

Last Updated 23 January 2010.

=== Most wickets ===
The following table contains the five leading wicket-takers of the season.

Player	Team	Wkts	Mts	Ave	S/R	Econ	BBI
John Hastings	Victoria	10	7	20.70	16.8	7.39	3/21
Aaron Heal	Western Australia	9	5	13.00	13.3	5.85	2/13
Brad Knowles	Western Australia	9	5	15.77	12.6	7.47	3/20
Naved-ul-Hasan	Tasmania	9	5	16.11	12.5	7.69	3/15
Nathan Rimmington	Queensland	8	6	15.75	13.5	7.00	3/13

Last Updated 23 January 2010.

=== Best bowling figures ===
This table lists the top five players with the best bowling figures in the season.

Player	Team	Overs	Figures	Opponent	Ground
Mitchell Marsh	Western Australia	2.2	4/6	New South Wales	WACA Ground
Steve Smith	New South Wales	4.0	4/13	Tasmania	Bellerive Oval
Shahid Afridi	South Australia	4.0	4/19	Western Australia	WACA Ground
Brett Geeves	Tasmania	4.0	4/30	Queensland	Brisbane Cricket Ground
Shaun Tait	South Australia	2.0	3/12	Victoria	Adelaide Oval

Last Updated 23 January 2010.

== Media coverage ==
Television

- Fox Sports (live) – Australia
- Star Cricket (live) – India, Sri Lanka, Pakistan
- Sky Sports (live) – United Kingdom and Ireland
- SKY Sport (live) – New Zealand
- Supersport (live) – South Africa
