= Steve Gilmour =

Steve Gilmour may refer to:

- Steve Gilmour (cricketer)
- Steve Gilmour (politician)
