= Jon Holland =

Australian cricketer (born 1987)

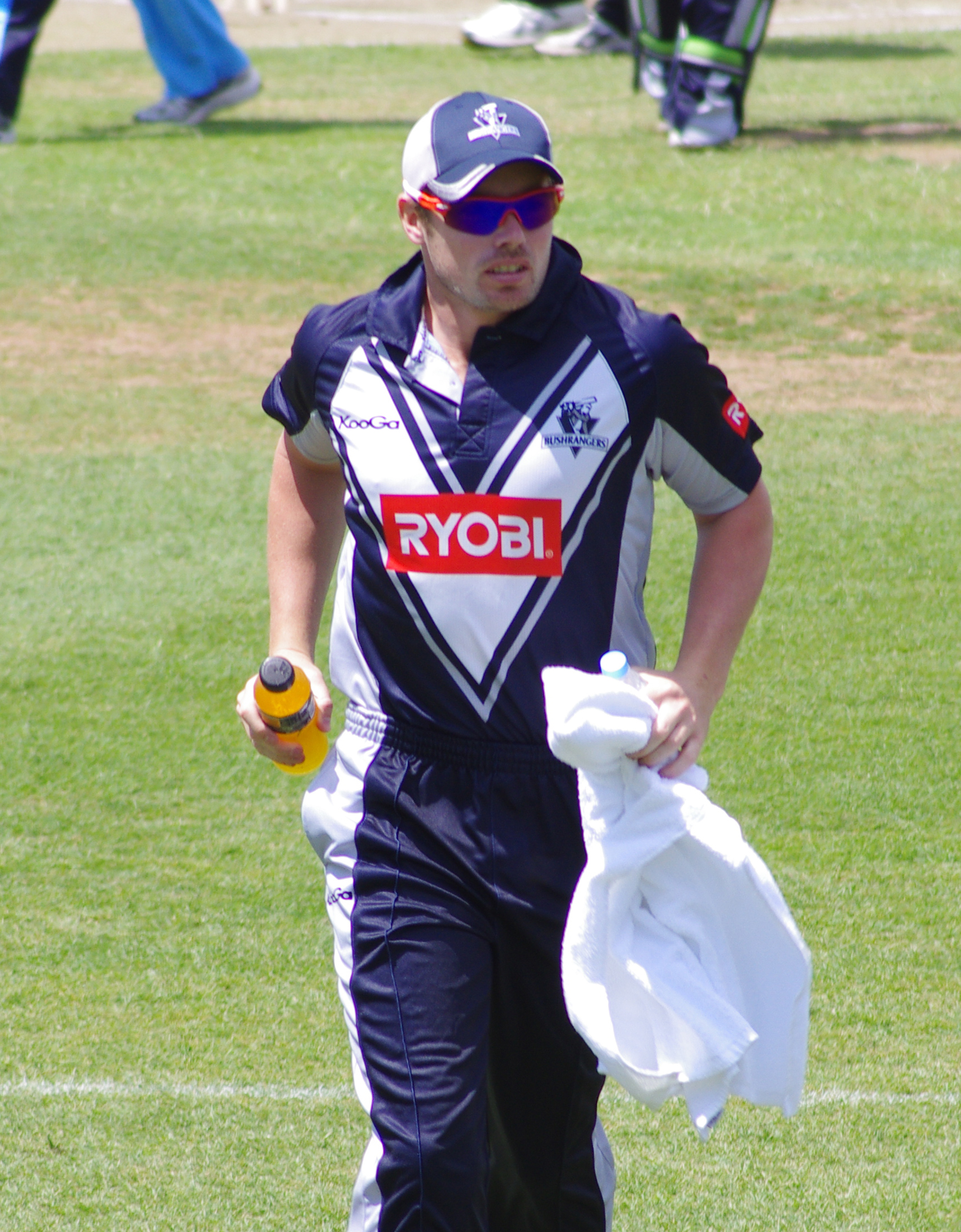
- Holland in 2011

Personal information
- Full name: Jonathan Mark Holland
- Born: 29 May 1987 (age 39); Sandringham, Victoria, Australia
- Height: 1.81 m (5 ft 11 in)
- Batting: Right-handed
- Bowling: Slow left-arm orthodox
- Role: Bowler

International information
- National side: Australia (2016–2018)
- Test debut (cap 444): 4 August 2016 v Sri Lanka
- Last Test: 16 October 2018 v Pakistan

Domestic team information
- Years: Team
- 2008/09–present: Victoria
- 2013/14–2015/16: Adelaide Strikers
- 2017/18–2020/21: Melbourne Renegades

Career statistics
Competition	Test	FC	LA	T20
Matches	4	91	57	29
Runs scored	6	874	176	12
Batting average	3.00	14.81	8.80	3.00
100s/50s	0/0	0/2	0/0	0/0
Top score	3	55	14	5*
Balls bowled	960	19,363	2,905	468
Wickets	9	288	71	16
Bowling average	63.77	33.03	34.11	39.06
5 wickets in innings	0	11	1	0
10 wickets in match	0	0	–	–
Best bowling	3/83	7/82	6/29	2/19
Catches/stumpings	1/–	29/–	16/–	8/–
- Source: ESPNcricinfo, 24 December 2022

Jonathan Mark Holland (born 29 May 1987) is a former Australian cricketer. He played as a slow left-arm orthodox bowler and a right-handed tail-end batsman.

== Early career ==
Holland made his state cricket debut for Victoria in October 2008. He only played four first-class games in the 2008–09 Sheffield Shield season and didn't secure a permanent place in Victoria's first-class team, as he had to compete for a place in the team with the much older spin bowler Bryce McGain. However, he made his debut at a time when Australia lacked top-level spin bowlers, so he was rushed into Australia's second-level team, Australia A, for a series against Pakistan A in June 2009. He was selected by the Australian national team for a seven-match series in India in October 2009, but did not play a single game in the series. He was set to make his One Day International debut in the final match of the series, but the match was cancelled due to rain. Holland experienced injury problems with his left shoulder through his early career, forcing him to undergo a shoulder reconstruction in 2010.

Holland continued to play at state level for Victoria over the following years, and in the winter of 2012 he was against selected to play for Australia A, this time in England. In October 2012, national selector John Inverarity called him Australia's second-best spin bowler, saying, "I think it's fair to say that we're of the view that the two best spinners we've got just at this moment are Nathan Lyon and Jon Holland." Despite this, he still struggled to get an opportunity to bowl for Victoria, as the team prioritised its lineup of fast bowlers. While playing a grade cricket game in October 2012, Holland re-injured his left shoulder and underwent another shoulder reconstruction, ruling him out of the rest of the 2012–13 season.

Holland was joined at Victoria by fellow spin bowler Fawad Ahmed, who gradually took over from Holland as Victoria's first choice spinner. In the 2015–16 Sheffield Shield season, Holland was used primarily in matches where Victoria needed two spin bowlers. Despite this he still performed well in the matches where he was selected.

== International career ==
In July 2016, Holland was selected for Australia A to replace the injured Ashton Agar. Australia A were preparing for a match in Brisbane at the same time as Australia's Test team were on a tour of Sri Lanka. On this tour, Steve O'Keefe suffered a hamstring injury, so Holland was chosen to replace him. He had to fly from Brisbane back to his home in Melbourne to renew his expired passport and then fly from Melbourne to Galle to join the Australian team. He made his Test debut on 4 August 2016 in the second Test and had his baggy green cap presented to him by former Australian fast bowler Merv Hughes. He bowled alongside Nathan Lyon on spinning pitches in Sri Lanka, but he failed to have a strong impact.

Holland did not become a regular member of the Test team, as Nathan Lyon remained their first-choice spin bowler and both O'Keefe and Agar were ahead preferred to Holland when fit. Holland wasn't included in the Test squad again until January 2018, when he was selected to join the team's upcoming tour of South Africa.

Holland's performances at state level put him back up as Australia's second-choice spin bowler, and played alongside Lyon again against Pakistan in the United Arab Emirates in October 2018. He struggled again on turning pitches, because his finger spin technique was unable to get as much out of the pitch as Australia's part-time wrist spin bowler Marnus Labuschagne.
