= Jimmy Maher =

Australian cricketer

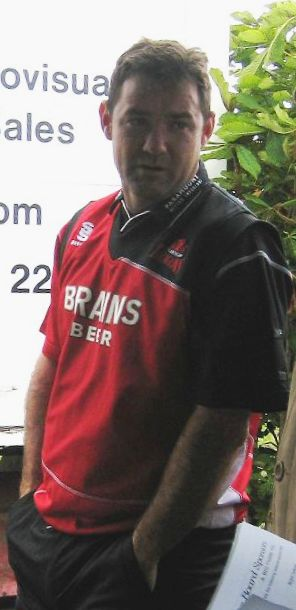

Personal information
- Full name: James Patrick Maher
- Born: 27 February 1974 (age 52); Innisfail, Queensland, Australia
- Nickname: Mahbo
- Height: 182 cm (6 ft 0 in)
- Batting: Left-handed
- Bowling: Right-arm medium
- Role: Batsman

International information
- National side: Australia (1998–2003)
- ODI debut (cap 137): 14 January 1998 v New Zealand
- Last ODI: 9 November 2003 v New Zealand
- ODI shirt no.: 46

Domestic team information
- Years: Team
- 1993/94–2007/08: Queensland
- 2001: Glamorgan
- 2003: Glamorgan
- 2005–2006: Durham
- 2007: Glamorgan
- 2008: Hyderabad Heroes

Career statistics
Competition	ODI	FC	LA	T20
Matches	26	206	214	18
Runs scored	438	13,149	7,439	366
Batting average	25.76	38.78	39.15	26.14
100s/50s	0/1	27/61	16/36	0/3
Top score	95	223	187	59
Balls bowled	–	852	165	–
Wickets	–	10	6	–
Bowling average	–	50.40	28.00	–
5 wickets in innings	–	0	0	–
10 wickets in match	–	0	0	–
Best bowling	–	3/11	3/29	–
Catches/stumpings	18/–	210/3	104/1	4/–
Medal record
Men's Cricket
Representing Australia
ICC Cricket World Cup
Winner	2003 South Africa-Zimbabwe-Kenya
- Source: CricketArchive, 7 August 2017

James Patrick Maher (born 27 February 1974) is an Australian former cricketer, who played One Day Internationals. He is "an attractive left-handed batsman with a clumping cover-drive". He was a part of the Australian squad which won the 2003 Cricket World Cup.

Maher competed in the Gladiator Team Sports Challenge in 1995.

== Domestic career ==
The following two seasons were a prolific pair for Maher playing for Queensland, a time which included a period at Glamorgan. In 2001–02, he became the first batsman to reach 1000 runs in the Pura Cup.

On 25 February 2007, Maher was named Man of the Match in the Ford Rangers Cup Final against the Victorian Bushrangers after making 108 from 133 balls. The Queensland Bulls went on to win the match by 21 runs. It was the third time that he had scored a century for Queensland in a One Day domestic final.

He retired from all types of cricket at the end of the Australian 2007–08 domestic season. Soon afterwards, he joined the Zee Telefilms' rebel Indian Cricket League, playing for the Hyderabad Heroes as an opening batsman.

Having spent two season at Durham Maher played for Glamorgan in 2007 after supporters funded the signing.

== International career ==
He was first selected to play for Australia in two one-day matches in 1997–98, due to illness and injury respectively to Mark Waugh and Steve Waugh.

He came back into the international fold in 2002, after the Waugh brothers were sacked following an ODI season in which Australia failed to make the finals of the triangular ODI series. He responded with a steady innings of 95 against South Africa. He was included in the Australian ODI squad as a spare batsman and as a fill-in wicketkeeper for the next few seasons, including the 2003 Cricket World Cup.

== Controversy ==
On 11 February 2007 Maher was criticised by South Australian cricket captain Darren Lehmann for not declaring to make a game of their Pura Cup match at the Gabba. Lehmann said he thought he was playing Tasmania referring to Tasmania's reliance on final day run chases.

Maher caused controversy in 1995 following Queensland's Sheffield Shield win over South Australia, when he said during a television interview "I'm as full as a coon's Valiant". Indigenous Australians criticised Maher for his statement and its racial undertone. Maher later publicly apologised over the statement.

Preceded by Stuart Law	Queensland ING Cup captain 2002/03–2007/08	Succeeded by Chris Simpson
Preceded by Stuart Law	Queensland Pura Cup captain 2002/03–2007/08	Succeeded by Chris Simpson
