= Jeremy Smith (cricketer) =

Australian cricketer (born 1988)

Jeremy Stewart Smith (born 23 October 1988 in Launceston, Tasmania) is an Australian cricketer who plays for the Tasmania Tigers on a rookie contract. He represented the Australian team at the 2008 U/19 Cricket World Cup, taking three wickets. In February 2009 he made his List A debut against Victoria.

== See also ==
- List of Tasmanian representative cricketers
