= David Bandy =

Australian cricketer (born 1978)

David Charles Bandy (born 19 July 1978 in Subiaco, Western Australia) is an Australian first-class cricketer who played for Western Australia between 2005 and 2010. He played an allrounder who batted right-handed and bowled right-arm medium.

Bandy did not play for the Western Australian XI until the age of 27.
