= Tim MacDonald =

Australian cricketer

Tim Macdonald
Personal information
- Full name: Timothy Peter Macdonald
- Born: 7 September 1980 (age 46); Subiaco, Western Australia
- Batting: Right-handed
- Bowling: Right-arm medium-fast

Career statistics
Competition	FC	LA	T20
Matches	21	1	3
Runs scored	120	–	8
Batting average	6.31	–	–
100s/50s	0/0	–	0/0
Top score	17	–	8*
Balls bowled	3,393	48	66
Wickets	50	0	3
Bowling average	35.30	–	22.00
5 wickets in innings	1	–	0
10 wickets in match	0	–	0
Best bowling	6/40	–	1/18
Catches/stumpings	8/–	1/–	0/–
- Source: Cricinfo, 24 May 2020

Timothy Peter Macdonald (born 7 September 1980) is an Australian cricket coach and former cricketer, who is an assistant coach of the England women's cricket team. As a player, MacDonald was a bowler who played for Western Australia and Tasmania.

== Career ==
Macdonald was a pace bowler who represented Western Australia and Tasmania. He played club cricket for Claremont-Nedlands in the WACA District League; he took 70 wickets in the 2005-06 tournament at an average of 11.63. He was signed by Western Australia for the 2006–07 season. He was not selected for the Tasmania squad for the 2011–12 season.

In the 2013–14 season, Macdonald was player-coach of the Claremont-Nedlands; he took 42 wickets in the season, the most of any Claremont-Nedlands player. After the season, MacDonald retired from playing cricket. He was named the WACA District League Senior Coach of the Year for the 2016–17 season.

MacDonald later worked as an assistant coach under Lisa Keightley at Perth Scorchers and Western Fury. He was an assistant coach for the Australia women's national cricket team for their 2017–18 series in India. McDonald was later an assistant coach of the England women's cricket team for the 2020 ICC Women's T20 World Cup, and in August 2020, he was given the role full-time.
