= James Hopes =

Australian cricketer (born 1978)

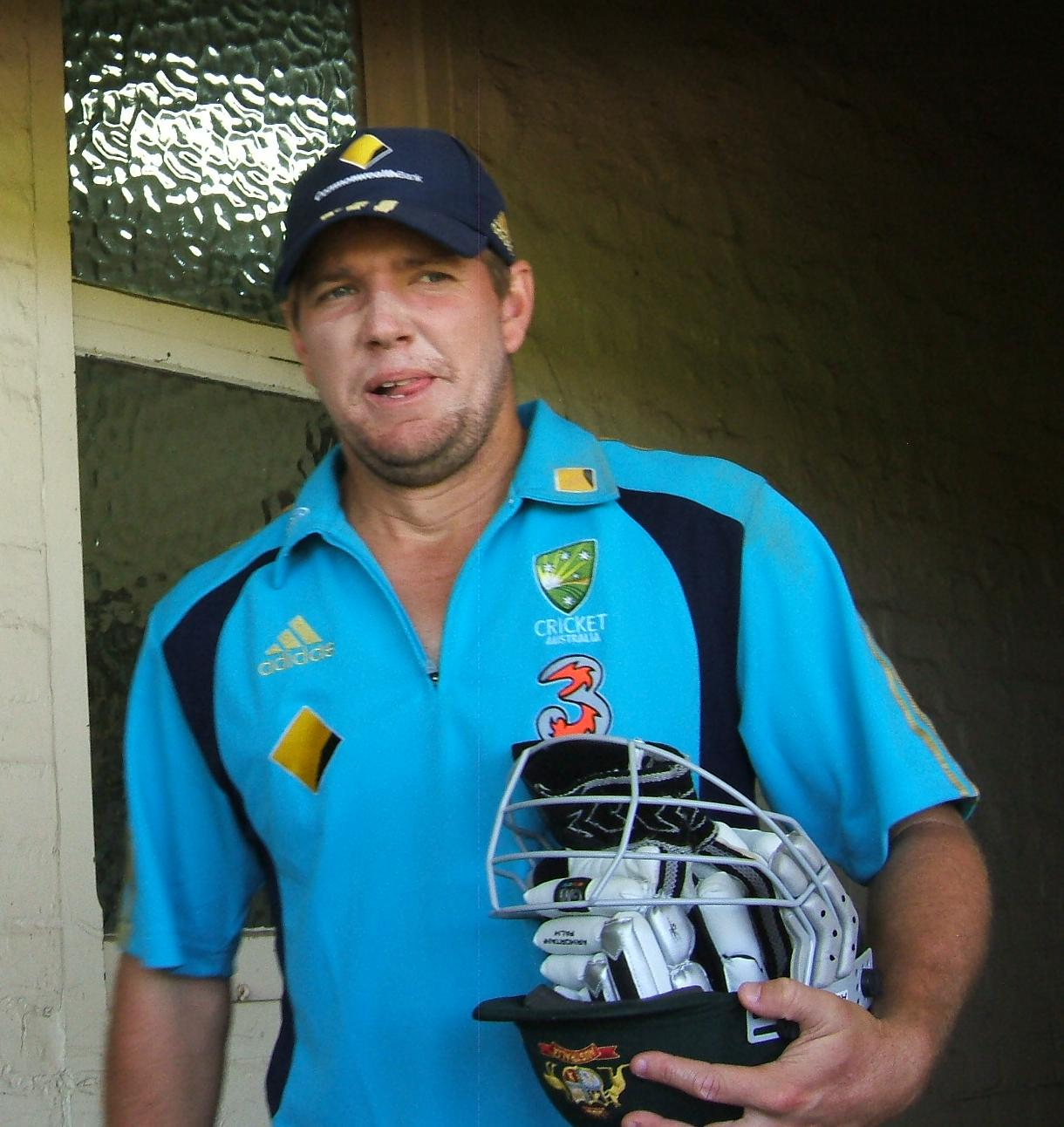
- Hopes at a training session at Adelaide Oval

Personal information
- Full name: James Redfern Hopes
- Born: 24 October 1978 (age 48); Townsville, Queensland, Australia
- Nickname: Catfish
- Height: 1.8 m (5 ft 11 in)
- Batting: Right-handed
- Bowling: Right-arm medium
- Role: All-rounder

International information
- National side: Australia (2005–2010)
- ODI debut (cap 151): 1 March 2005 v New Zealand
- Last ODI: 20 October 2010 v India
- T20I debut (cap 3): 17 February 2005 v New Zealand
- Last T20I: 6 July 2010 v Pakistan

Domestic team information
- Years: Team
- 2000/01–2015/16: Queensland
- 2011/12–2015/16: Brisbane Heat
- 2008: Kings XI Punjab
- 2011: Delhi Daredevils

Career statistics
Competition	ODI	T20I	FC	LA
Matches	84	12	108	209
Runs scored	1,326	105	5,402	3,800
Batting average	25.01	21.00	31.77	25.33
100s/50s	0/3	0/0	5/34	2/16
Top score	63*	30	146	115
Balls bowled	3,157	222	19,436	9,128
Wickets	67	10	301	228
Bowling average	35.58	28.30	26.66	30.59
5 wickets in innings	1	0	11	2
10 wickets in match	–	–	0	–
Best bowling	5/14	2/26	6/40	5/14
Catches/stumpings	25/–	3/–	48/–	53/–
- Source: ESPNcricinfo, 21 December 2022

James Redfern Hopes (born 24 October 1978) is an Australian cricket coach and former cricketer. Hopes played domestic cricket for Queensland, and had represented Australia in One Day International and Twenty20 International cricket from 2005 to 2010. Hopes was consistently one of the best bowlers in Australian domestic cricket through his career, and when he retired in 2016 he was the top wicket-taker of the last decade despite never being selected to play in a Test match for Australia.

After his playing career, Hopes was the bowling coach of the Delhi Capitals in the Indian Premier League until 2020.

== Early career ==
Hopes represented his home state of Queensland in both under-17s and under-19s cricket, which resulted in him being selected to play for the Australian under-19 cricket team for a tour of Pakistan in the 1996/97 season and the 1998 Under-19 Cricket World Cup. Hopes made his debut for Queensland's senior team in 2001 in both one-day cricket and first-class cricket.

He had opened innings for Queensland in 2006/07 scoring 553 runs and taking 21 wickets in the Pura Cup, and capturing a season-high 20 victims and a first one-day century in the FR Cup.

== International career ==
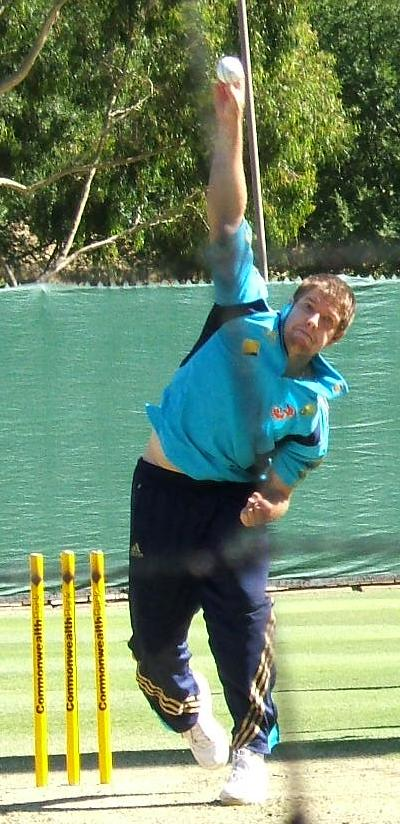
Hopes bowling in the Adelaide Oval nets, January 2009

Hopes was selected to play for the Australian national cricket team for the first time in February 2004, replacing injured all-rounder Shane Watson. He made eight ODI appearances in 2004/05. He did not take more than a wicket in a match although his batting showed promise with a top score of 43 against Sri Lanka. Hopes was dropped from the squad at the end of the 2004–05 VB Series and missed the tour to South Africa, but when Shane Watson suffered a calf problem in Bangladesh he was replaced again by Hopes. He was once again dropped from the squad ahead of the 2007 Cricket World Cup.

In 2007/08, Hopes experienced a busy campaign with 24 ODIs as he took part in all of Australia's one-day series. In March 2008, he scored his maiden ODI half century during his 28th match, scoring 63 off 80 balls against India in the 2nd final of the 2007–08 Commonwealth Bank Series, bringing Australia close to an unlikely win. His effort though was in vain as India went on to win the game and the tournament.

Hopes became a regular part of Australia's national team in ODI cricket at a time when the team had lost their number 1 ranking and sought to rebuild with new players. He reached his peak in late 2009 when he was ranked as the second-best all-rounder in the world. In early 2010 he scored his third half-century with 56 off 26 balls against West Indies at the Melbourne Cricket Ground. His most productive day at international level came in June 2010 when his 5 for 14 ensured Australia would not be embarrassed by losing to Ireland in an ODI in Dublin. He was named the player of the match for achieving his career-best bowling figures. After playing 84 ODIs, Hopes was dropped from the national side for good ahead of the 2011 Cricket World Cup, missing out on the second world cup in a row despite playing for Australia consistently between the two.

== Indian Premier League ==
Ahead of the inaugural season of the Indian Premier League (IPL), Hopes was bought by Kings XI Punjab on the second day of the auction (at US$300,000, he was the most expensive signing of the day). He was a fine contributor during the season, scoring half-centuries against Chennai Super Kings and Rajasthan Royals. Hopes had to be released from his contract for the first part of the 2009 IPL so he could play for the Australian national team. He ultimately did not play for Australia at this time, as he had a minor knee injury, but missing this time in the IPL cost him over $100,000. Hopes missed the second event to rest an injury, and was hurt in the lead-up to the third tournament.

Hopes changed teams and played for the Delhi Daredevils in the 2011 IPL. He played well despite the team having a poor season, and when captain Virender Sehwag was injured he was chosen to replace him as interim captain for the final three games. Delhi lost two of those three matches and finished in last place. He was transferred to the Pune Warriors for the 2012 IPL, but had to pull out of the tournament due to a knee injury.

== Later domestic career ==
In 2010/11, he was handed the state captaincy replacing Chris Simpson. He was named Sheffield Shield Player of the Series for the 2010/11 series. He became 49th captain of the state.

In November 2010, Hopes picked up 3 for 40 and then top scored with 73 as the Bulls pushed well past Tasmania's disappointing 196 on the second day at Bellerive Oval.

In December 2010, he took-up coaching role of Queensland as caretaker coach began with a victory after he replaced Trevor Barsby on a sensational day for the Bulls where they bowled out Western Australia on 136 and won the match by 76 runs.

In Big Bash match against Tasmania, he scored unbeaten 65 runs and also affected a run-out and took a one-handed catch to dismiss Ryan ten Doeschate was declared the Man-of-the-Match.

In Big Bash match against New South Wales, he scored unbeaten 62 runs 38 balls and the set match off the very first ball when James Hopes bowled Usman Khawaja who chopped a pull back onto his stumps.

In 2011, an allround performance from Hopes led Queensland to a comfortable six-wicket victory against New South Wales in Ryobi Cup. Hopes provided a solid start with 41 off 56 deliveries before this he took 4 wickets for 16 runs.

Hopes took six-wicket haul and ensured that Queensland finished in third place on the 2010/11 Sheffield Shield table with victory by an innings and three runs over Victoria. Hopes was named the Sheffield Shield Player of the Series for 2010/11 at the State Cricket Awards in Hobart. Hopes finished season with averaged of 58.70 with the bat and 20.11 with the ball winning 23 votes won the award ahead of Tasmania allrounder Luke Butterworth.

In 2011 Big Bash League, Hopes was signed with the Brisbane Heat.

As captain, Hopes led Queensland to back-to-back Sheffield Shield finals in 2012 and 2013, winning the title in 2012. He retired from all forms of cricket at the end of the 2015–16 Sheffield Shield season. Over his last three seasons, he took 102 first-class wickets, more than any other Australian bowler in that time.
