= Grant Lambert =

Australian cricketer (born 1977)

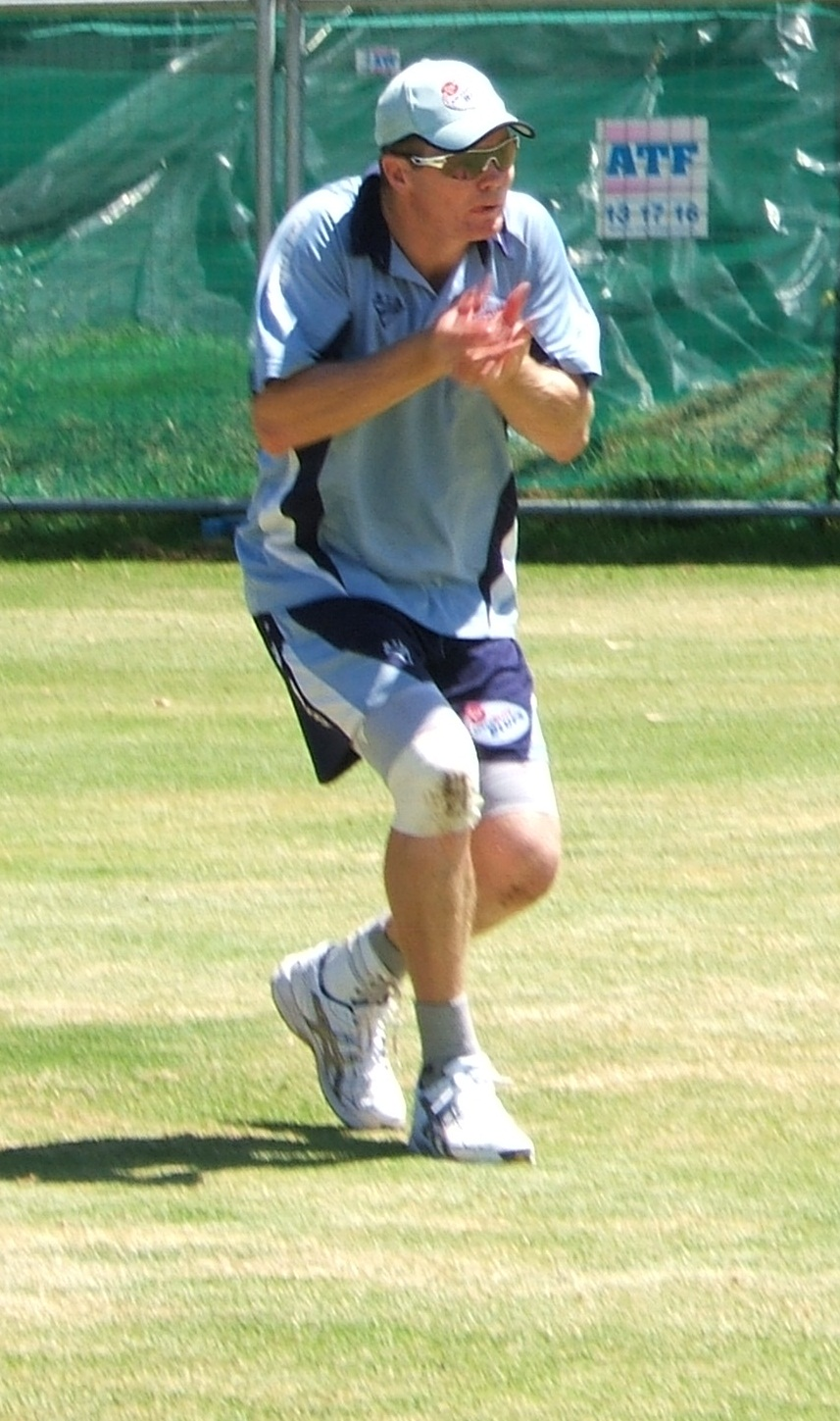

Personal information
- Full name: Grant Michael Lambert
- Born: 5 August 1977 (age 49); Parramatta, Australia
- Nickname: Lambos
- Height: 1.94 m (6 ft 4 in)
- Batting: Right-handed
- Bowling: Right-arm fast
- Role: All rounder

Domestic team information
- Years: Team
- 2001/02–2009/10: New South Wales Blues

Career statistics
Competition	FC	LA	T20
Matches	39	15	2
Runs scored	1,215	191	–
Batting average	23.36	23.87	–
100s/50s	0/6	0/0	–
Top score	86	48*	–
Balls bowled	5,105	696	30
Wickets	88	15	4
Bowling average	35.97	43.86	12.75
5 wickets in innings	2	0	0
10 wickets in match	0	0	0
Best bowling	5/74	2/33	3/20
Catches/stumpings	16/–	3/–	0/–
- Source: , 23 April 2023

Grant Michael Lambert (born 5 August 1977) is an Australian cricketer. He played first-class cricket for New South Wales as a right-arm fast-medium bowler and a right-handed batsman. His best bowling effort was 4/80 against Tasmania in 2005/06. He twice won the Bill O'Reilly Medal as the best player in the Sydney Grade competition.

He was educated at Patrician Brothers' College Blacktown and has contributed to the coaching of the school's elite cricket program.

== Sydney Grade Cricket record ==
On 24 February 2007 Lambert broke a 63-year-old record for the most runs in a Sydney Grade Cricket season. Playing for Fairfield-Liverpool against Northern Districts at Rosedale Oval, Lambert scored 94 to take his season total to 1458 runs. This moved him 45 runs ahead of Bill Alley's record of 1413 runs set in the 1943/44 season. Lambert reached the mark in 20 innings, which included six centuries and five 50s, at an average of 104.14. Alley required 24 innings at 70.65 to set the previous record. In this same game the Fairfield-Liverpool side broke a 20-year ground record for the highest team total of 5 dec for 447, in which Northern Districts chased down the runs only to fall at 304 all out.
