= Burt Cockley =

Australian cricketer

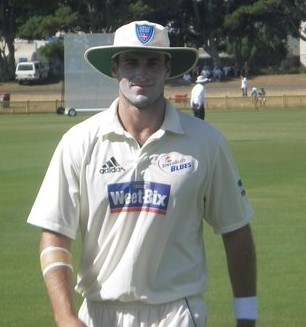

Personal information
- Full name: Burt Thomas Cockley
- Born: 3 April 1986 (age 40); Newcastle, New South Wales, Australia
- Batting: Right-handed
- Bowling: Right-arm Fast-medium
- Role: Bowler

Domestic team information
- Years: Team
- 2007/08–2009/10: New South Wales
- 2012/13–2013/14: Western Australia
- 2013/14: Perth Scorchers

Career statistics
Competition	FC	LA	T20
Matches	14	7	1
Runs scored	37	6	–
Batting average	5.28	6.00	–
100s/50s	0/0	0/0	–
Top score	11*	6*	–
Balls bowled	2,226	196	18
Wickets	44	7	0
Bowling average	28.40	55.28	–
5 wickets in innings	2	0	–
10 wickets in match	0	0	–
Best bowling	5/76	4/39	–
Catches/stumpings	0/–	1/–	0/–
- Source: , 24 April 2023

Burt Thomas Cockley (born 3 April 1986) is an Australian cricketer who has played for New South Wales and Western Australia. He is a right-handed batsman and a right-arm fast bowler.

Born and raised in Newcastle New South Wales, Cockley attended school at Callaghan College. As a young cricketer he played for the Waratah-Mayfield District Cricket Club. At the age of 17 he made his First Grade debut for Waratah-Mayfield. After being selected in the NSW Country Colts and NSW Country sides, Cockley moved to Sydney to play for Randwick Petersham Cricket Club in the Sydney Grade Cricket Competition.

After only one season in Sydney, Cockley was picked for the NSW State side. He debuted in First Class cricket for NSW against Tasmania at Hobart in the 2007–08 season. In February 2009 he was signed by the Kings XI Punjab franchise of the Indian Premier League for the 2009 season and in November 2009 he was added to Australia's injury-ravaged squad in India, as a replacement for Peter Siddle. The last match of the tour which he was called up for was cancelled due to monsoon weather.

Upon returning home from the ODI tour of India, Cockley was struck down with a stress fracture in his back while playing against Western Australia and ruled out for the following 5 months. Upon his return through grade cricket with his grade club, Randwick Petersham DCC, he ruptured his ACL in his front leg while bowling a bouncer. Complication ensued with staph infection in his knee which required the hamstring graft to be removed. 10 weeks later a new graft was inserted into his knee once the infection and knee had settled down following the complications.

Cockley returned to playing after 10 months of rehab and managed to finish out the remainder of the 2011–12 season with NSW 2nd XI. He moved to Western Australia in 2012 and played his first matches for the state team early in 2013. Cockley tore his meniscus in the same troubled knee while playing against England in a tour game for Western Australia which required surgery. Cockley came off contract at the end of the 2013–14 season.

Cockley now resides in Dallas, Texas. Cockley completed his master's of sports science degree from the University of Kansas and working as the Head of Physical Performance at USA Cricket.
