= Brett Geeves =

Australian cricketer (born 1982)

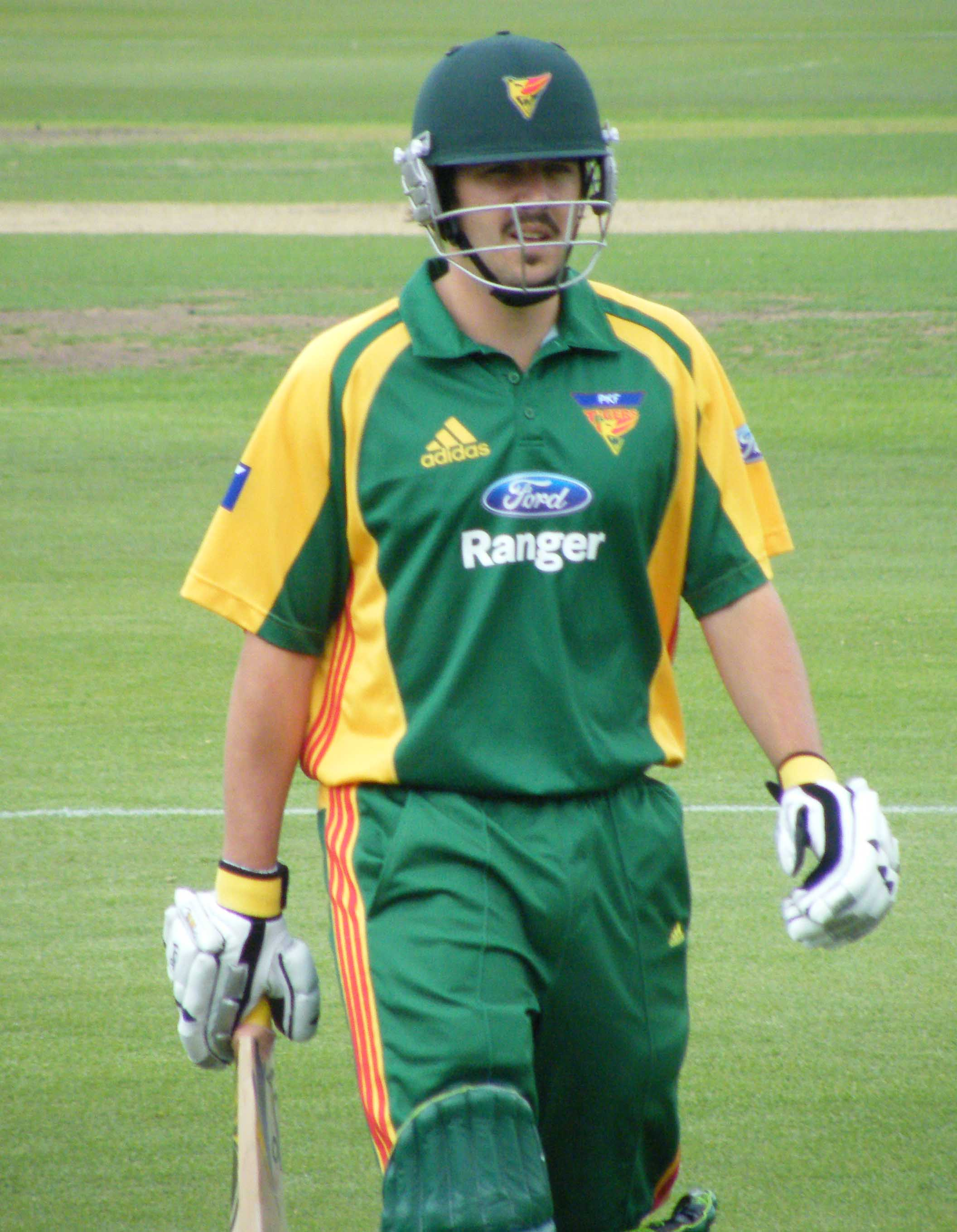

Personal information
- Full name: Brett Geeves
- Born: 13 June 1982 (age 44); Claremont, Tasmania, Australia
- Nickname: Banger
- Height: 1.85 m (6 ft 1 in)
- Batting: Right-handed
- Bowling: Right-arm fast-medium
- Role: Bowler

International information
- National side: Australia (2008–2009)
- ODI debut (cap 168): 30 August 2008 v Bangladesh
- Last ODI: 9 April 2009 v South Africa

Domestic team information
- Years: Team
- 2000/01–2010/11: Tasmania
- 2008: Delhi Daredevils

Career statistics
Competition	ODI	T20I	FC	LA
Matches	2	1	41	72
Runs scored	10	–	1,006	340
Batting average	–	–	21.86	13.07
100s/50s	0/0	–	0/4	0/0
Top score	10*	–	99*	37*
Balls bowled	90	20	8,126	3,551
Wickets	3	2	140	103
Bowling average	26.00	17.50	33.10	29.20
5 wickets in innings	0	0	6	1
10 wickets in match	0	0	0	0
Best bowling	2/11	2/35	6/47	5/45
Catches/stumpings	1/–	0/–	12/–	17/–
- Source: CricketArchive, 18 July 2020

Brett Geeves (born 13 June 1982) is an Australian retired cricketer, who played for the Tasmanian Tigers in Australian domestic cricket, and for the Glenorchy Cricket Club in Tasmanian club cricket. He was also selected by the Delhi DareDevils in the Indian Premier League. Primarily a right-arm opening bowler, Geeves scored 99 not out on two occasions in the Sheffield Shield.

In 2011, he was forced to retire from domestic and international cricket due to a series of back injuries. He now works in government programs and provides commentary for local media.

== International career ==
Geeves made his One Day International debut against Bangladesh on 30 August 2008, taking 2 for 11. In March 2009 he was called up to the Australian squad touring South Africa after Doug Bollinger suffered an abdominal-muscle strain while training in the nets.
