= Nick Kruger =

Australian cricketer (born 1983)

Personal information
- Full name: Nicholas James Kruger
- Born: 14 August 1983 (age 43); Paddington, New South Wales, Australia
- Batting: Left-handed
- Bowling: Right-arm medium
- Role: Batsman

Domestic team information
- Years: Team
- 2002/03–2009/10: Queensland (squad no. 32)
- 2010/11–2011/12: Tasmania

Career statistics
Competition	FC	List A
Matches	28	10
Runs scored	1,321	254
Batting average	27.52	25.40
100s/50s	3/4	0/2
Top score	172	71
Balls bowled	311	37
Wickets	2	3
Bowling average	95.00	12.33
5 wickets in innings	0	0
10 wickets in match	0	0
Best bowling	1/31	2/25
Catches/stumpings	18/–	2/–
- Source: CricketArchive, 12 November 2017

Nicholas James Kruger (born 14 August 1983) is an Australian cricketer who has played first-class cricket for Queensland and List A cricket for Tasmania. A left hand opening batsman, Kruger made his debut in 2003 as 19-year-old, however, his career has been set back by a number of shoulder injuries. He scored his highest first-class score in a tour match against the touring West Indies cricket team in November 2009.

In 2011, Kruger transferred to Tasmania, and made his debut for them in a List A one-day game against Victoria at Hobart on 9 February 2011. He made 19 with the bat and took 2/25 with the ball.
