= Steve Gilmour (cricketer) =

Australian cricketer (born 1986)

Personal information
- Full name: Steve Thomas Gilmour
- Born: 16 October 1986 (age 40); Australia
- Nickname: Happy
- Batting: Right-handed
- Bowling: Right-arm fast-medium

Domestic team information
- Years: Team
- 2010–present: Victoria

Career statistics
Competition	First-class	List A
Matches	3	1
Runs scored	48	–
Batting average	16	–
100s/50s	0/0	–
Top score	29	–
Balls bowled	400	12
Wickets	9	1
Bowling average	35.88	15
5 wickets in innings	0	0
10 wickets in match	0	0
Best bowling	3/66	1/15
Catches/stumpings	0/–	0/–
- Source: Cricinfo, 31 July 2011

Steve Gilmour (born 16 October 1986) is a former Australian professional cricketer. Gilmour made his first-class debut late in the 2008–09 season. He was contracted to the Victorian Bushrangers with the squad number 30 for the 2011/12 Australian cricket summer
