= Gerard Denton =

Australian first-class cricketer

Personal information
- Full name: Gerard John Denton
- Born: 7 August 1975 (age 51); Mount Isa, Queensland, Australia
- Height: 1.86 m (6 ft 1 in)
- Batting: Right-handed
- Bowling: Right-arm fast-medium
- Role: Bowler

Domestic team information
- Years: Team
- 1994/95–2004/05: Tasmania (squad no. 6)
- 2005/06–2006/07: Victoria
- 2007/08–2010/11: Tasmania (squad no. 6)

Career statistics
Competition	FC	LA	T20
Matches	58	45	13
Runs scored	605	99	24
Batting average	11.86	16.50	12.00
100s/50s	0/0	0/0	0/0
Top score	48	35	10
Balls bowled	10,318	2,137	260
Wickets	181	61	12
Bowling average	31.28	28.24	29.50
5 wickets in innings	5	1	0
10 wickets in match	0	0	0
Best bowling	6/31	5/45	3/26
Catches/stumpings	16/–	9/–	4/–
- Source: CricInfo, 18 July 2020

Gerard John Denton (born 7 August 1975) is an Australian former first-class cricketer who played for Tasmania. The right-arm fast-medium bowler began his first-class cricket for Tasmania, despite having been born in Queensland. He switched to the Victoria for two seasons (2005/06 and 06/07), before returning to Tasmania for the 2007/08 season.

Denton has had a career hampered by injuries. When fit he can be destructive, as shown by when he dismissed Stuart Law, Allan Border and Jimmy Maher in the space of six deliveries on debut in the 1994–95 summer. He took a couple of years off before returning in 1998–99 for Tasmania and earning Australia A selection. Stress fractures would set him back both in 1999–2000 and 2000–01. He recovered and reappeared in 2001–02 and after a couple of decent seasons he was back to his best in 2003–04, taking 30 wickets at 33.13. He moved to Victoria the following summer but did not get much game time due to hip and foot injuries. His only appearance for the Bushrangers was an ING Cup game. In 2005–06 he made the headlines by breaking one of Justin Langer's ribs which cost the opener a Test place. It would be another painful season for Denton as he suffered from appendicitis late in the summer which meant that he could not line up in the Pura Cup final. He still finished Victoria's leading wicket taker with 33 at 28.15 from his eight matches.
