= Craig Philipson =

Australian cricketer (born 1982)

Personal information
- Full name: Craig Andrew Philipson
- Born: 18 November 1982 (age 43); Herston, Queensland, Australia
- Nickname: Flipper
- Height: 1.73 m (5 ft 8 in)
- Batting: Right-handed
- Bowling: Right-arm medium
- Role: Batsman

Domestic team information
- Years: Team
- 2003/04–2010/11: Queensland
- 2011/12: Sydney Thunder
- FC debut: 21 January 2004 Queensland v Tasmania
- Last FC: 18 December 2010 Queensland v New South Wales
- LA debut: 17 January 2004 Queensland v New South Wales
- Last LA: 8 December 2010 Queensland v Western Australia

Career statistics
Competition	FC	LA	T20
Matches	29	57	26
Runs scored	1,136	1,528	354
Batting average	24.17	34.72	18.63
100s/50s	2/3	1/9	0/0
Top score	119	100	46*
Balls bowled	138	66	–
Wickets	3	2	–
Bowling average	30.00	29.00	–
5 wickets in innings	0	0	–
10 wickets in match	0	0	–
Best bowling	2/18	1/2	–
Catches/stumpings	22/–	19/–	6/–
- Source: CricketArchive, 5 November 2011

Craig Andrew Philipson (born 18 November 1982) is an Australian cricketer who played for Queensland in Australian domestic cricket as an attacking right-handed batsman.

Philipson scored 110 on his first class debut, against Tasmania. In 2004–05 he had his best season to date with 447 Pura Cup runs at 37.25. He is a former Australia Under-19 player and was part of the side that won the 2002 World Cup.
