= Scott Walter =

Australian cricketer (born 1989)

Personal information
- Full name: Scott Hugh Walter
- Born: 2 May 1989 (age 37); Brisbane, Queensland, Australia
- Batting: Right-handed
- Bowling: Left-arm fast-medium

Domestic team information
- Years: Team
- 2008/09–2012/13: Queensland

Career statistics
Competition	First-class	List A
Matches	11	6
Runs scored	78	0
Batting average	13.00	–
100s/50s	0/0	0/0
Top score	15*	0*
Balls bowled	1,710	246
Wickets	34	8
Bowling average	30.73	30.43
5 wickets in innings	2	0
10 wickets in match	0	0
Best bowling	6/121	4/34
Catches/stumpings	5/–	3/–
- Source: Cricinfo, 7 January 2012

Scott Hugh Walter (born 2 May 1989) is an Australian former professional cricketer, who played as a left-arm fast-medium bowler for Queensland. He was born at Brisbane.

Walter represented Queensland at youth level and played for the Queensland Academy of Sport. In the 2008–09 season, he represented Queensland's senior team for the first time, with performances that included a six-wicket haul in a Sheffield Shield match against Western Australia and another four wickets in a limited overs match against South Australia. His first class debut earlier in the season had been marred by an injury that meant he could only bowl eight overs in the match.

Post first-class cricket, Walter played first grade cricket for the University of Queensland cricket club in the Queensland Premiere Cricket competition until 2021. Highlights of his club career include bowling figures of 9/15 against the Redland Cricket Club.
