= Wes Robinson =

Australian cricketer (born 1980)

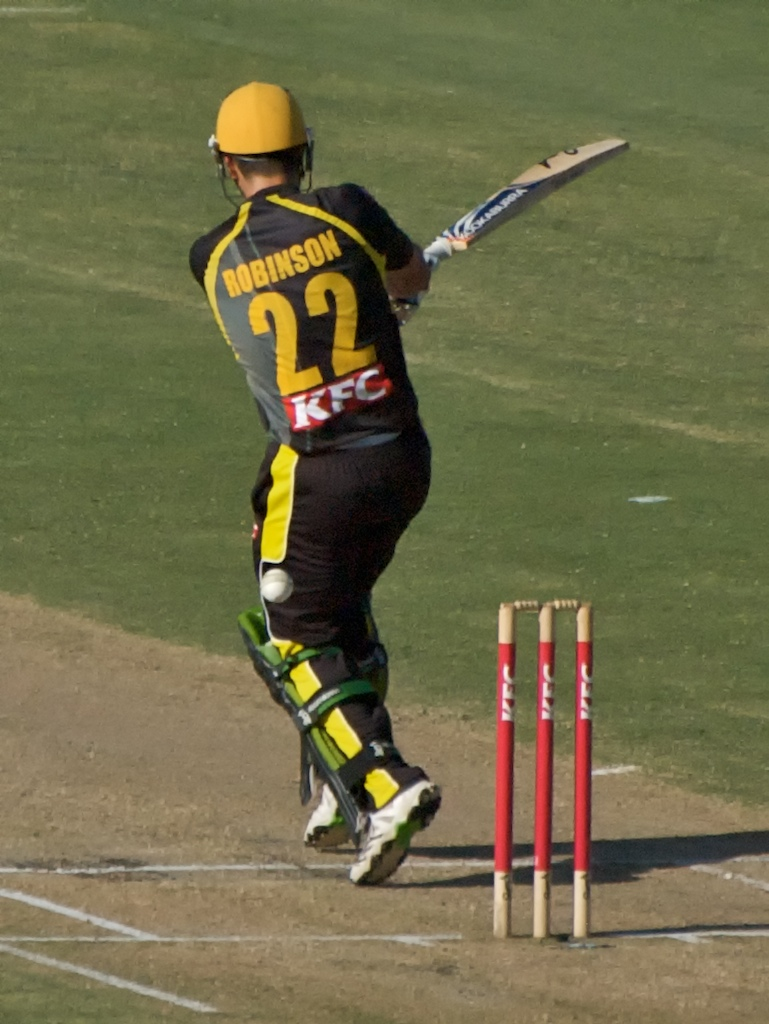

Personal information
- Full name: Wesley Michael Robinson
- Born: 26 December 1980 (age 45); Duncraig, Western Australia
- Batting: Left-handed
- Bowling: Left-arm medium
- Role: Batsman

Domestic team information
- Years: Team
- 2008/09–2012/13: Western Australia

Career statistics
Competition	FC	LA	T20
Matches	35	16	3
Runs scored	2,254	562	139
Batting average	34.67	35.12	46.33
100s/50s	2/15	0/5	0/2
Top score	141	87	54
Balls bowled	370	–	–
Wickets	6	–	–
Bowling average	39.83	–	–
5 wickets in innings	0	–	–
10 wickets in match	0	–	–
Best bowling	2/26	–	–
Catches/stumpings	18/–	3/0	1/0
- Source: Cricinfo, 24 May 2020

Wesley Michael Robinson (born 26 December 1980) is an Australian former first-class cricketer who played for Western Australia.

Robinson made his first class debut for Western Australia at the age of 28. Robinson made 143 representing Cricket Australia's Chairman's XI against an Indian XI in December 2011. Robinson was not offered a new WA contract at the end of 2011–2 season and moved to Victoria, playing for VCA club Footscray-Edgewater in the 2012–13 season.
