= John Hastings (cricketer) =

Australian cricketer

Personal information
- Full name: John Wayne Hastings
- Born: 4 November 1985 (age 41); Penrith, New South Wales, Australia
- Nickname: The Duke
- Height: 1.98 m (6 ft 6 in)
- Batting: Right-handed
- Bowling: Right-arm fast-medium
- Role: All-rounder

International information
- National side: Australia (2010–2017)
- Only Test (cap 430): 30 November 2012 v South Africa
- ODI debut (cap 184): 20 October 2010 v India
- Last ODI: 2 June 2017 v New Zealand
- T20I debut (cap 47): 31 October 2010 v Sri Lanka
- Last T20I: 9 September 2016 v Sri Lanka
- T20I shirt no.: 41

Domestic team information
- Years: Team
- 2007/08–2016/17: Victoria
- 2012/13–2017/18: Melbourne Stars
- 2014: Chennai Super Kings
- 2014–2015: Durham
- 2016: Kolkata Knight Riders
- 2017: Worcestershire
- 2018: Quetta Gladiators

Career statistics
Competition	Test	ODI	FC	LA
Matches	1	29	75	113
Runs scored	52	271	2,231	1,260
Batting average	26.00	27.10	22.08	20.65
100s/50s	0/0	0/1	0/11	0/2
Top score	32	51	93	69*
Balls bowled	234	1,486	13,191	5,872
Wickets	1	42	239	179
Bowling average	153.00	29.90	27.22	27.59
5 wickets in innings	0	1	7	3
10 wickets in match	0	0	0	0
Best bowling	1/51	6/45	7/60	6/45
Catches/stumpings	1/–	5/–	35/–	35/–
- Source: ESPNcricinfo, 5 October 2021

John Wayne Hastings (born 4 November 1985) is an Australian former international cricketer who played for the Victoria cricket team. He played as an all-rounder.

In October 2017, he announced his retirement from Test and One Day International cricket. Later that month, he retired from all forms of cricket following a lung condition.

== Domestic career ==
At the end of the 2006–07 season, Hastings was recruited from New South Wales, where he had represented the state in under-age and Second XI teams. He impressed with his first one-day games for Victoria and grabbed three wickets in six deliveries on debut in 2007–08, when he was asked to bowl at the death against Queensland. His first-class debut, against the touring Indian national team, was ruined by rain. Hastings was given three more first-class opportunities in 2008–09, taking 16 wickets at 18.56, including 5 for 61 against his home state.

On 9 January 2011, he was bought by the Kochi Tuskers Kerala for US$20,000, and in 2014 the Chennai Super Kings purchased him.

He previously played for the Melbourne Stars, a Twenty20 team. He is contracted to play for English county side Durham for the 2016 English season. He won the Big Bash Smash for the longest six of the competition

In the players auction for the 2014 IPL, he was bought by Chennai Super Kings for Rs. 50 lakhs (Rs. 5 million).

In 2014, he along with Calum McLeod holds the highest 6th wicket partnership in T20 history (126*)

== International career ==
After a series of injuries to several senior Australian pacemen, Hastings was called into the ODI team to tour India in October 2010. He made his ODI debut against India in Visakhapatnam in October 2010. He did not bat and took 2/44 from ten overs. He removed centurion Virat Kohli and then bowled captain MS Dhoni for a duck later in the same over.

On 18 January 2011, he was announced in Australia's 15-man squad for the 2011 Cricket World Cup.

On 30 November 2012, Hastings made his début as Australia's 430th Test Cricketer against South Africa at the WACA.

In 2015, after a series of injuries to several senior Australian pacemen again, Hastings was called into the ODI team, this time as India tours in Australia in January 2016.

In 2018, however, he has a career-threatening health issue, where he coughs out blood only while bowling. As such, he did not play cricket in 2018.

== Honours ==
- Bradman Young Cricketer of the Year: 2010
