= Mick Martell =

Australian cricket umpire (born 1966)

Personal information
- Full name: Michael Douglas Martell
- Born: 28 September 1966 (age 60); Perth, Western Australia
- Role: Umpire

Umpiring information
- ODIs umpired: 8 (2014–2017)
- T20Is umpired: 4 (2014–2017)
- WODIs umpired: 3 (2009–2011)
- WT20Is umpired: 1 (2011)
- Source: CricketArchive, 22 February 2017

Michael Douglas Martell (born 28 September 1966) is an Australian cricket umpire and former cricketer.

== Playing career ==
Martell played 34 first grade matches in Western Australian Grade Cricket for Wanneroo and Bayswater-Morley. He later played for Balcatta Cricket Club in the WA Suburban Turf competition where he was the Champion Cricketer for the 2000–2001 season.

== Umpiring career ==
After an arm injury cut short his cricket career, he took up umpiring. He made his debut at domestic level in October 2007 at one day level and at first-class level in October 2008.

He umpired in his first Twenty20 International match in November 2014, in the 2nd T20I between Australia and South Africa. He umpired his first ODI on 23 November 2014 at the SCG between Australia and South Africa.
