= Aaron Heal =

Australian cricketer (born 1983)

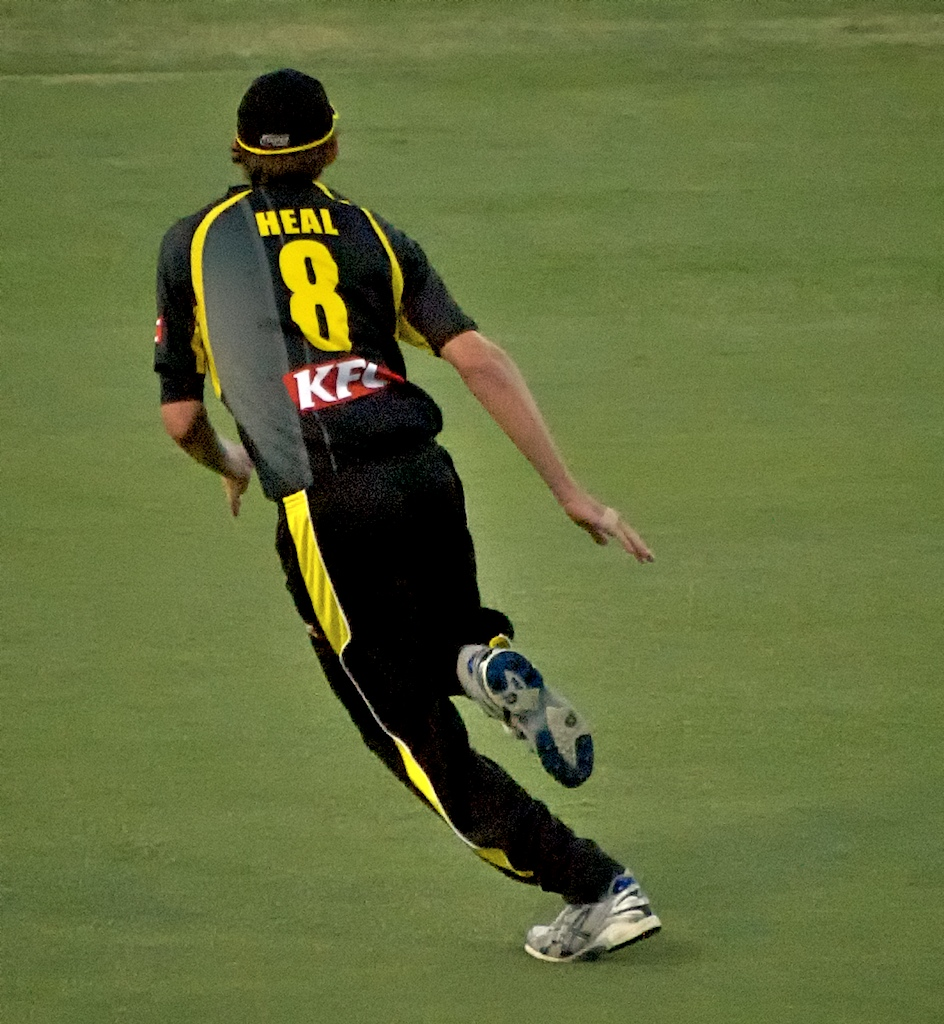
- Heal fielding during the 2009-10 KFC Twenty20 Big Bash

Personal information
- Full name: Aaron Keith Heal
- Born: 13 March 1983 (age 43); Armadale, Western Australia
- Batting: Left-handed
- Bowling: Slow left-arm orthodox

Domestic team information
- Years: Team
- 2003/04–2010/11: Western Australia
- 2011/12: Melbourne Renegades

Career statistics
Competition	FC	LA	T20
Matches	10	36	23
Runs scored	439	250	54
Batting average	20.90	13.88	6.00
100s/50s	0/4	0/1	0/0
Top score	81*	50	13
Balls bowled	3,507	1,874	490
Wickets	36	40	26
Bowling average	51.05	37.92	22.15
5 wickets in innings	2	0	0
10 wickets in match	1	0	0
Best bowling	5/57	4/58	2/13
Catches/stumpings	7/–	7/–	5/–
- Source: CricketArchive, 3 January 2014

Aaron Keith Heal (born 13 March 1983) is an Australian cricketer who played domestically for Western Australia and later the Melbourne Renegades. A left-arm orthodox spinner and capable lower-order batsman, Heal debuted during the 2003–04 season, and played in the team that won that season's ING Cup. He established himself in Western Australia's first-class (Sheffield Shield) and limited-overs (Ford Ranger Cup) sides during the 2006–07 season, taking over from Brad Hogg as the team's primary spinner, but was selected less regularly over the following seasons. Heal's last first-class and one-day matches came during the 2010–11 season, but he was a regular when the team played in the KFC Twenty20 Big Bash, maintaining both a low economy rate and a low bowling average. His performances at Twenty20 led to his naming in Australia's initial 30 man squad for the 2009 ICC World Twenty20. Heal signed with the Melbourne Renegades for inaugural season of the Big Bash League, playing four matches.
