= Bob Parry =

Australian cricket umpire (born 1953)

Personal information
- Full name: Robert Leslie Parry
- Born: 2 January 1953 (age 73); Melbourne, Victoria, Australia
- Role: Umpire

Umpiring information
- ODIs umpired: 4 (2002)
- T20Is umpired: 2 (2006–2007)
- WODIs umpired: 3 (2002–2008)
- FC umpired: 98 (1998–2012)
- LA umpired: 64 (1997–2012)
- T20 umpired: 17 (2006–2012)
- Source: Cricinfo, 9 October 2013

Robert Leslie Parry (born 2 January 1953) is an Australian former cricket umpire. Parry umpired in One Day Internationals and Twenty20 Internationals as well as in Australian domestic cricket from 1998 until 2012.

== Umpiring career ==
In December 1998 he had his first-class debut and then his ODI debut on 11 January 2002. His international debut with the T20 International was on 9 January 2006. He had 7 test matches all as 3rd umpire and 34 ODIs, 4 of which were on-field and 30 of which were as 3rd umpire. He had 3 T20 Internationals, 2 of which were on-field and 1 of which was 3rd umpire. He had 79 Sheffield Shield/Pura Cup matches which included four finals (77 on-field and 2 as 3rd umpire). He had 53 one-day domestic matches which included two finals (45 on-field and 8 as 3rd umpire). He also had 24 other first-class or list "A" matches which includes tour matches, Aus A and Women's International matches.

== See also ==
- List of One Day International cricket umpires
- List of Twenty20 International cricket umpires
