= Rhett Lockyear =

Australian cricketer (born 1983)

Personal information
- Full name: Rhett John Gaven Lockyear
- Born: 28 February 1983 (age 43); Mudgee, New South Wales, Australia
- Height: 1.82 m (6 ft 0 in)
- Batting: Right-handed
- Bowling: Right-arm medium
- Role: Batsman

Domestic team information
- Years: Team
- 2004/05–2011/12: Tasmania
- 2011/12: Hobart Hurricanes
- 2012/13: Sydney Thunder
- FC debut: 29 November 2004 Tasmania v Queensland
- Last FC: 10 March 2010 Tasmania v Victoria
- LA debut: 25 January 2006 Tasmania v New South Wales
- Last LA: 22 December 2010 Tasmania v Western Australia

Career statistics
Competition	FC	LA	T20
Matches	15	21	23
Runs scored	570	412	415
Batting average	19.00	24.23	18.04
100s/50s	0/3	1/1	0/3
Top score	85	111	64
Balls bowled	126	12	60
Wickets	3	0	2
Bowling average	20/66	–	15.00
5 wickets in innings	0	–	0
10 wickets in match	0	–	0
Best bowling	1/1	–	2/20
Catches/stumpings	6/–	13/–	5/–
- Source: Cricinfo, 5 July 2011

Rhett John Gaven Lockyear (born 28 February 1983) is an Australian former professional cricket player, who played for the Sydney Thunder and the Tasmanian Tigers. He plays club cricket for Tasmania University Cricket Club.

Rhett is a right-handed middle order batsman who has recurentely been performing consistently for club side University. He has had limited opportunities to establish himself in the Tiger's line-up.

On 18–20 November 2007, he assisted the Australian national side as a 12th man during the Hobart Test against Sri Lanka. In the first innings, he was involved in the run out of Farveez Maharoof and caught Michael Vandort off the bowling of Mitchell Johnson. In the second innings he was involved in the run out of Dilhara Fernando.

In October 2011 he was a member of the Australian squad at the 2011 Hong Kong International Cricket Sixes tournament. In the opening game against Ireland, he captained the team and retired not out on 31 runs.
