= Chris Simpson (cricketer) =

Australian cricketer

Personal information
- Full name: Christopher Patrick Simpson
- Born: 9 January 1982 (age 44); Brisbane, Queensland, Australia
- Nickname: Simmo
- Height: 1.89 m (6 ft 2 in)
- Batting: Right-handed
- Bowling: Right-arm offbreak
- Role: All-rounder

Domestic team information
- Years: Team
- 2002/03–2010/11: Queensland
- 2011/12: Melbourne Stars
- FC debut: 6 March 2003 Queensland v New South Wales
- Last FC: 18 December 2010 Queensland v New South Wales
- LA debut: 16 November 2003 Queensland v Victoria
- Last LA: 6 November 2010 Queensland v Tasmania

Career statistics
Competition	FC	LA	T20
Matches	51	57	24
Runs scored	1,791	667	333
Batting average	21.57	16.26	15.85
100s/50s	2/10	0/1	0/1
Top score	120	61*	76
Balls bowled	6,085	2,193	402
Wickets	47	49	23
Bowling average	69.42	35.44	22.00
5 wickets in innings	1	0	0
10 wickets in match	0	0	0
Best bowling	5/68	4/34	3/17
Catches/stumpings	41/–	25/–	7/–
- Source: CricketArchive, 5 November 2011

Christopher Patrick Simpson (born 9 January 1982) is a former Australian cricketer who captained Queensland from 2007 to 2010 and has been chairman of Queensland Cricket since July 2019. He was a right-arm offbreak bowler and right-handed batsman.

Simpson attended school at Villanova College in Coorparoo, where he played for the 1st XI from grade 9 to 12. Simpson was originally a fast bowler, turning to offspin in 2001–02.

He played his first Pura Cup in 2002–03 season against New South Wales, but it wasn't till 2005–06 that Simpson started tasting success. He played four Pura Cup games and was selected for the Prime Minister's XI against the West Indies. He faced the West Indies again, playing for Queensland, and picked up four wickets. His batting impressed, with two half-centuries in a total of 158 runs at 26.33. He credits a stint with Forfarshire in the Scottish Cricket League, during his younger days, as being hugely important in developing him both as a player and a person.

Simpson's highest first-class score was 120 against New South Wales in 2007–08. His best bowling figures were 5 for 68 against New South Wales in 2008–09.

Simpson has a master's degree in finance from London Business School and an executive MBA from Queensland University of Technology. He has worked in executive positions in finance and banking. As of 2024 he is a freelance consultant with Byrne, Camel & Co, and the managing director of Cultivate Agri Partnerships, which specializes in agricultural finance.

He is married to former Miss Universe Australia winner 2007, Kimberley Busteed. They have two daughters, Victoria and Evie.

Sporting positions
Preceded by Jimmy Maher	Queensland captain 2007/08–2010/11	Succeeded by James Hopes
