= 2007–08 Twenty20 Big Bash =

Twenty20 Big Bash 2007–08
- Administrator: Cricket Australia
- Cricket format: Twenty20
- Tournament format: Single round-robin
- Champions: Victoria (3rd title)
- Participants: 6
- Matches: 16
- Player of the series: David Hussey (Vic)
- Most runs: Shaun Marsh (WA) (290)
- Most wickets: Dirk Nannes (Vic) (12)

The 2007–08 KFC Twenty20 Big Bash was the 3rd season of the official Twenty20 domestic cricket in Australia. Six teams representing six states in Australia participated in the competition. The competition began on 31 December 2007 when the Queensland Bulls took on two-time champions the Victorian Bushrangers at the new Tony Ireland Stadium in Thuringowa. Another match between the Western Warriors and the previous year's finalists the Tasmanian Tigers was held on the same day at the WACA Ground.

This season comprised 15 regular matches, instead of twelve from the 2006–07 season. This allowed each team to play every other team once.

== Table ==
Teams received 2 points for a win, 1 for a tie or no result, and 0 for a loss. The top two teams, Western Australia and Victoria, played in the final at the WACA Ground in Perth. These two teams also qualified for the 1st edition of the Champions Twenty20 League, expected to be hosted by India in December 2008.

Pos	Team	Pld	W	L	T	NR	Pts	NRR
1	Western Warriors	5	4	1	0	0	8	0.584
2	Victorian Bushrangers	5	4	1	0	0	8	0.582
3	Tasmanian Tigers	5	3	2	0	0	6	0.681
4	New South Wales Blues	5	2	3	0	0	4	−0.078
5	Queensland Bulls	5	1	3	0	1	3	−0.294
6	Southern Redbacks	5	0	4	0	1	1	−1.719

== Teams ==
Club	Home Ground	Captain
New South Wales Blues	ANZ Stadium, Sydney	Simon Katich
Queensland Bulls	Brisbane Cricket Ground	James Hopes
Southern Redbacks	Adelaide Oval	Daniel Harris
Tasmanian Tigers	Bellerive Oval, Hobart	George Bailey
Victorian Bushrangers	Melbourne Cricket Ground	Cameron White
Western Warriors	WACA Ground, Perth	Adam Voges

== Fixtures ==
31 December 2007
15:00
Scorecard

Victoria; 7/187 (20 overs)	v	Queensland (H); 140 (19.3 overs)
Andrew McDonald 43 (28); Adam Crosthwaite 31 (24); Shane Watson 2/31 (4 overs)		Jimmy Maher 44 (35); Michael Kasprowicz 20 (16); Andrew McDonald 3/20 (4 overs)

Victoria won by 47 runs
Tony Ireland Stadium, Thuringowa
Attendance: 10,024
Umpires: AR Curran and TP Laycock
Player of the match: Andrew McDonald

31 December 2007
17:30
Scorecard

(H) Western Australia; 4/188 (20 overs)	v	Tasmania; 5/189 (18.4 overs)
Luke Pomersbach 79 (45); Adam Voges 39 (24); Brett Geeves 1/24 (4 overs)		George Bailey 51* (29); Dane Anderson 31 (20); David Bandy 2/41 (4 overs)

Tasmania won by 5 wickets with 8 balls remaining
WACA Ground, Perth, Att:
Umpires: IH Lock and MD Martell
Player of the match: George Bailey

1 January 2008
18:30
Scorecard

(H) South Australia; 9/134 (20 overs)	v	New South Wales; 2/135 (17 overs)
Ryan Harris 31 (38); Daniel Harris 22 (11); Moises Henriques 2/19 (4 overs)		Brad Haddin 54 (44); Dominic Thornley 37* (22); Jason Gillespie 1/16 (3 overs)

New South Wales won by 8 wickets with 18 balls remaining
Adelaide Oval, Adelaide
Attendance: 9,112
Umpires: SD Fry and AD Willoughby
Player of the match: Simon Katich

4 January 2008
16:30

Victoria; 9/186 (20 overs)	v	Western Australia (H); 5/187 (18.3 overs)
Brad Hodge 45 (30); Andrew McDonald 31 (24); Aaron Heal 2/18 (4 overs)		Sean Ervine 56* (34); Luke Pomersbach 39 (22); Dirk Nannes 2/29 (4 overs)

Western Australia won by 5 wickets with 9 balls remaining
WACA Ground, Perth
Umpires: AR Craig and IH Lock
Player of the match: Sean Ervine

4 January 2008
18:30
Scorecard

(H) Queensland	v	South Australia

Match abandoned without a ball bowled
Brisbane Cricket Ground, Brisbane

4 January 2008
18:30
Scorecard

New South Wales; 8/157 (20 overs)	v	Tasmania (H); 5/161 (19.5 overs)
Brad Haddin 49 (41); David Warner 31 (22); Ben Hilfenhaus 3/28 (4 overs)		George Bailey 54 (38); Michael Dighton 29 (23); Doug Bollinger 2/26 (3 overs)

Tasmania won by 5 wickets with 1 ball remaining
Bellerive Oval, Hobart
Umpires: SG John and BJ Muir
Player of the match: George Bailey

6 January 2008
16:30
Scorecard

South Australia; 7/127 (20 overs)	v	Tasmania (H); 2/131 (10.3 overs)
Callum Ferguson 40 (36); Nathan Adcock 39 (42); Ben Hilfenhaus 2/21 (4 overs)		Rhett Lockyear 64 (27); Michael Dighton 30 (21); Mark Cosgrove 1/22 (2.3 overs)

Tasmania won by 8 wickets with 57 balls remaining
Bellerive Oval, Hobart
Attendance: 3,531
Umpires: SG John and GJ Luck
Player of the match: Rhett Lockyear

6 January 2008
18:30
Scorecard

(H) Victoria; 6/154 (20 overs)	v	New South Wales; 8/142 (20 overs)
David Hussey 70* (40); Brad Hodge 44 (41); Steve Smith 2/15 (2 overs)		Dominic Thornley 26 (20); Moises Henriques 24 (16); David Hussey 2/20 (4 overs)

Victoria won by 12 runs
Melbourne Cricket Ground, Melbourne
Attendance: 15,000
Umpires: AP Ward and JD Ward
Player of the match: David Hussey

6 January 2008
18:30
Scorecard

Queensland; 9/154 (20 overs)	v	Western Australia (H); 6/157 (20 overs)
Shane Watson 51 (30); Lee Carseldine 32 (21); Brett Dorey 3/19 (4 overs)		Shaun Marsh 70 (49); David Bandy 34* (26); Lee Carseldine 2/13 (3 overs)

Western Australia won by 4 wickets
WACA Ground, Perth
Attendance: 8,000
Umpires: JK Brookes and MD Martell
Player of the match: Shaun Marsh

8 January 2008
18:30
Scorecard

(H) New South Wales; 8/121 (20 overs)	v	Queensland; 115 (20 overs)
Dominic Thornley 40 (36); Nathan Hauritz 23 (25); Ashley Noffke 2/13 (4 overs)		Nathan Reardon 31 (31); Aaron Nye 20 (17); Steve Smith 4/15 (3 overs)

New South Wales won by 6 runs
ANZ Stadium, Sydney
Attendance: 23,000
Umpires: GA Abood and RD Goodger

8 January 2008
18:30

(H) Victoria; 7/178 (20 overs)	v	Tasmania; 171 (20 overs)
David Hussey 54 (33); Cameron White 30 (26); Brett Geeves 3/36 (4 overs)		Travis Birt 40 (24); Michael Dighton 31 (20); Clinton McKay 3/49 (4 overs)

Victoria won by 7 runs
Melbourne Cricket Ground, Melbourne
Umpires: PR Reiffel and AP Ward
Player of the match: David Hussey

8 January 2008
18:30
Scorecard

(H) South Australia; 97 (19.3 overs)	v	Western Australia; 5/98 (16.3 overs)
Nathan Adcock 28 (26); Graham Manou 20* (25); Ben Edmondson 4/14 (3.3 overs)		Adam Voges 36* (36); Theo Doropoulos 25* (21); Ryan Harris 2/18 (4 overs)

Western Australia won by 5 wickets with 21 balls remaining
Adelaide Oval, Adelaide
Attendance: 4,580
Umpires: AR Collins and SJ Davis
Player of the match: Ben Edmondson

10 January 2008
Scorecard

(H) New South Wales; 7/159 (20 overs)	v	Western Australia; 4/160 (17.3 overs)
Steve Smith 33 (26); Scott Coyte 28* (14); Brett Dorey 2/23 (4 overs)		Shaun Marsh 67 (50); Luke Ronchi 52 (26); Steve Smith 3/18 (3.3 overs)

Western Australia won by 6 wickets with 15 balls remaining
ANZ Stadium, Sydney
Umpires: GA Abood and TJ Keel
Player of the match: Luke Ronchi

10 January 2008
Scorecard

Victoria; 9/142 (20 overs)	v	South Australia (H); 137 (19.3 overs)
David Hussey 50 (37); Robert Quiney 20 (24); Shaun Tait 3/28 (4 overs)		Daniel Harris 48 (36); Daniel Christian 40 (20); Bryce McGain 2/10 (4 overs)

Victoria won by 5 runs
Adelaide Oval, Adelaide
Umpires: SD Fry and AD Willoughby
Player of the match: David Hussey

10 January 2008
Scorecard

Tasmania; 8/174 (20 overs)	v	Queensland (H); 1/177 (16.1 overs)
Luke Butterworth 36 (34); Rhett Lockyear 24 (12); Aaron Nye 3/28 (4 overs)		Shane Watson 69* (32); James Hopes 60 (29); Luke Butterworth 1/23 (2 overs)

Queensland won by 9 wickets with 23 balls remaining
Brisbane Cricket Ground, Brisbane
Attendance: 10,558
Umpires: AR Curran and BNJ Oxenford
Player of the match: James Hopes

== Final ==
13 January 2008
17:00
Scorecard

Victoria; 8/203 (20 overs)	v	Western Australia (H); 171 (19.3 overs)
Aiden Blizzard 47 (20); David Hussey 38* (24); Aaron Heal 2/25 (4 overs)		Shaun Marsh 86 (55); Theo Doropoulos 43 (27); Dirk Nannes 4/23 (4 overs)

Victoria won by 32 runs
WACA Ground, Perth
Attendance: 16,589
Umpires: IH Lock and BNJ Oxenford
Player of the match: Aiden Blizzard

== Statistics ==
=== Highest Team Totals ===
Team	Total	Opponent	Ground
Victoria	8/203	Western Australia	WACA Ground
Tasmania	5/189	Western Australia	WACA Ground
Western Australia	4/188	Tasmania	WACA Ground
Western Australia	5/187	Victoria	WACA Ground
Victoria	7/187	Queensland	Tony Ireland Stadium

=== Most Runs ===
Player	Runs	Inns	Avg	S/R	HS	100s	50s
Shaun Marsh (Western Australia)	290	6	58.00	142.15	86	–	3
David Hussey (Victoria)	237	6	47.40	153.89	70*	–	3
Luke Pomersbach (Western Australia)	178	6	35.60	142.40	79	–	1
Brad Hodge (Victoria)	172	6	28.66	126.47	45	–	–
Aiden Blizzard (Victoria)	145	6	24.16	185.89	47	–	–

=== Highest Scores ===
Player	Score	Balls	Opponent	Ground	4s	6s
Shaun Marsh (Western Australia)	86	55	Victoria	WACA Ground	7	4
Luke Pomersbach (Western Australia)	79	45	Tasmania	WACA Ground	9	4
David Hussey (Victoria)	70*	40	New South Wales	Melbourne Cricket Ground	4	4
Shaun Marsh (Western Australia)	70	49	Queensland	WACA Ground	8	1
Shane Watson (Queensland)	69*	32	Tasmania	Brisbane Cricket Ground	2	7

=== Most Wickets ===
Player	Wkts	Mts	Ave	S/R	Econ	BBI
Dirk Nannes (Victoria)	12	6	12.33	12.0	6.16	4/23
Steve Smith (New South Wales)	9	4	5.33	5.6	5.64	4/15
Aaron Heal (Western Australia)	9	6	17.66	15.7	6.71	2/18
Brett Dorey (Western Australia)	9	6	20.44	15.3	8.00	3/19
David Hussey (Victoria)	8	6	12.00	11.2	6.40	2/10

=== Best Bowling Figures ===
Player	Overs	Figures	Opponent	Ground
Ben Edmondson (Western Australia)	4.0	4/14	South Australia	Adelaide Oval
Steve Smith (New South Wales)	3.3	4/15	Queensland	ANZ Stadium
Dirk Nannes (Victoria)	4.0	4/23	Western Australia	WACA Ground
Steve Smith (New South Wales)	3.3	3/18	Western Australia	ANZ Stadium
Brett Dorey (Western Australia)	4.0	3/19	Queensland	WACA Ground

=== Player of the Series ===
David Hussey, Victorian Bushrangers

== See also ==
- Pura Cup season 2007-08
- Ford Ranger One Day Cup season 2007-08
- Australian cricket team in 2007-08
