= 2007–08 Ford Ranger One Day Cup season =

2007–08 Ford Ranger One Day Cup
- Administrator: Cricket Australia
- Cricket format: Limited overs cricket
- Tournament format: Double round-robin
- Champions: Tasmania (3rd title)
- Participants: 6
- Matches: 31
- Player of the series: Matthew Elliott (SA)
- Most runs: Michael Dighton (Tas) (549)
- Most wickets: Brendan Drew, Brett Geeves, Xavier Doherty (Tas); Bryce McGain (Vic) (15)

The 2007–08 Ford Ranger One Day Cup was the 38th season of official List A domestic cricket in Australia. Six teams representing six states in Australia took part in the competition. The competition began on 10 October 2007 when the 2006–07 season's champions, the Queensland Bulls took on the Tasmanian Tigers at the Gabba.

After several months delay when it was reported that the naming rights for the One Day Domestic Competition had lapsed, it was determined that for the 2007–08 season it would remain as the Ford Ranger Cup.

The 2007–08 Cup Final was played on 23 February 2008 at Bellerive Oval. In a low-scoring but dramatic, rain-interrupted match, Tasmania defeated Victoria by 1 wicket with only 5 balls to spare. Victoria scored 158, but the Tasmanians' innings target was reduced to 131 runs from 31 overs under the Duckworth–Lewis method.

== Table ==
The top two teams after each round was played competed in the Ford Ranger One Day Cup final. The match was contested at the home ground of the side that finished first. (For an explanation of how points are rewarded, see Ford Ranger One Day Cup – Points system).

Pos	Team	Pld	W	L	T	NR	BP	Pts	NRR
1	Tasmanian Tigers	10	7	3	0	0	4	32	0.563
2	Victorian Bushrangers	10	7	3	0	0	1	29	0.261
3	Southern Redbacks	10	4	5	0	1	2	20	−0.290
4	Queensland Bulls	10	4	5	0	1	2	20	−0.606
5	Western Warriors	10	4	6	0	0	3	19	0.080
6	New South Wales Blues	10	2	6	0	2	2	14	−0.259

== Teams ==
Club	Home ground	Captain
New South Wales Blues	Sydney Cricket Ground	Simon Katich
Queensland Bulls	Brisbane Cricket Ground	Jimmy Maher
Southern Redbacks	Adelaide Oval	Nathan Adcock
Tasmanian Tigers	Bellerive Oval	Daniel Marsh
Victorian Bushrangers	Melbourne Cricket Ground	Cameron White
Western Warriors	WACA Ground	Adam Voges

== Fixtures ==
=== Group matches ===
10 October

Tasmania; 7/226 (50 overs)	v	Queensland (H); 6/63 (23.3 overs)
Tim Paine 73* (95); Mark Divin 41 (39); Grant Sullivan 2/43 (9 overs)		Jimmy Maher 18 (39); Clinton Perren 16 (47); Brendan Drew 3/15 (5.3 overs)

Tasmania won by 89 runs (D/L method)
Brisbane Cricket Ground, Brisbane
Umpires: SD Fry and TP Laycock
Player of the match: Tim Paine

12 October

(H) Western Australia; 9/268 (50 overs)	v	New South Wales; 8/267 (50 overs)
Luke Ronchi 104 (92); Adam Voges 68 (71); Mark Cameron 2/55 (10 overs)		Phil Jaques 83 (108); Simon Katich 82 (81); Brett Dorey 2/36 (10 overs)

Western Australia won by 1 run
WACA Ground, Perth
Umpires: JK Brookes and PD Parker
Player of the match: Luke Ronchi

19 October

Victoria; 263 (50 overs)	v	South Australia (H); 247 (49.5 overs)
Cameron White 76 (94); Aiden Blizzard 72 (101); Ryan Harris 5/58 (9 overs)		Mark Cosgrove 92 (102); Nathan Adcock 49 (59); Shane Harwood 5/45 (9.5 overs)

Victoria won by 16 runs
Adelaide Oval, Adelaide
Umpires: AR Collins and BNJ Oxenford
Player of the match: Cameron White

21 October

Tasmania; 8/181 (50 overs)	v	Western Australia (H); 2/185 (37.2 overs)
Michael Dighton 38 (68); Daniel Marsh 34 (56); Adam Voges 3/33 (10 overs)		Justin Langer 75* (99); Shaun Marsh 66 (92); Brendan Drew 1/34 (7.2 overs)

Western Australia won by 8 wickets with 76 balls remaining
WACA Ground, Perth
Umpires: IH Lock and MD Martell
Player of the match: Aaron Heal

24 October

Queensland; 4/127 (27.5 overs)	v	New South Wales (H)
Ryan Broad 55* (82); Aaron Nye 43 (44); Mark Cameron 2/26 (5.5 overs)

No Result
Sydney Cricket Ground, Sydney
Umpires: GA Abood and RL Parry

27 October

South Australia; 7/207 (45 overs)	v	Tasmania (H); 4/216 (34 overs)
Graham Manou 50 (54); Daniel Harris 43 (50); Ben Hilfenhaus 2/41 (9 overs)		Michael Dighton 90 (90); Daniel Marsh 53* (45); Shaun Tait 3/44 (9 overs)

Tasmania won by 6 wickets with 66 balls remaining (D/L method)
Bellerive Oval, Hobart
Umpires: SJ Davis and SG John
Player of the match: Michael Dighton

31 October

Western Australia; 269 (50 overs)	v	Victoria (H); 8/222 (50 overs)
Justin Langer 105 (106); Adam Voges 51 (55); Clinton McKay 3/49 (9 overs)		David Hussey 54 (52); Aiden Blizzard 44 (45); Brad Hogg 4/37 (10 overs)

Western Australia won by 47 runs
Melbourne Cricket Ground, Melbourne
Umpires: DL Orchard and JD Ward
Player of the match: Justin Langer

4 November

(H) Tasmania; 5/325 (50 overs)	v	New South Wales; 275 (48.5 overs)
Daniel Marsh 106* (99); Travis Birt 79 (92); Nathan Hauritz 1/35 (10 overs)		Brad Haddin 138* (116); Peter Forrest 39 (64); Nathan Wegman 4/44 (8.5 overs)

Tasmania won by 50 runs
Bellerive Oval, Hobart
Umpires: SG John and PD Parker
Player of the match: Daniel Marsh

7 November

New South Wales; 7/233 (50 overs)	v	South Australia (H); 5/234 (50 overs)
Dominic Thornely 68 (65); Simon Katich 50 (56); Daniel Cullen 3/47 (10 overs)		Matthew Elliott 83 (113); Mark Cosgrove 51 (57); Steve O'Keefe 2/34 (10 overs)

South Australia won by 5 wickets
Adelaide Oval, Adelaide
Umpires: SD Fry and IH Lock
Player of the match: Matthew Elliott

14 November

(H) Western Australia; 144 (47.2 overs)	v	Queensland; 8/148 (39.5 overs)
Brad Hogg 33 (59); Adam Voges 28 (67); Chris Swan 4/24 (8 overs)		Craig Philipson 62 (89); Aaron Nye 31 (56); Steve Magoffin 3/29 (9 overs)

Queensland won by 2 wickets
WACA Ground, Perth
Umpires: AR Craig and PR Reiffel
Player of the match: Chris Swan

21 November

Western Australia; 6/305 (50 overs)	v	South Australia (H); 2/308 (47 overs)
Sean Ervine 134 (129); Luke Ronchi 69 (58); Shaun Tait 2/50 (10 overs)		Matthew Elliott 133* (137); Darren Lehmann 126* (104); Steve Magoffin 1/62 (9 overs)

South Australia won by 8 wickets
Adelaide Oval, Adelaide
Umpires: AR Collins and RL Parry
Player of the match: Darren Lehmann

23 November

(H) Queensland; 243 (48.1 overs)	v	Victoria; 193 (45.4 overs)
Clinton Perren 60 (75); Craig Philipson 42 (51); John Hastings 3/50 (10 overs)		Brad Hodge 50 (67); Adam Crosthwaite 43 (68); Lee Carseldine 2/15 (6 overs)

Queensland won by 8 wickets
Brisbane Cricket Ground, Brisbane
Umpires: TP Laycock and RJ Tucker
Player of the match: Aaron Nye

25 November

(H) New South Wales; 264 (49.5 overs)	v	Tasmania; 1/266 (45.5 overs)
Brad Haddin 74 (78); Simon Katich 56 (52); Brett Geeves 3/47 (10 overs)		Michael Dighton 144 (137); Ricky Ponting 111 (134); Nathan Bracken 1/38 (10 overs)

Tasmania won by 9 wickets
North Sydney Oval, Sydney
Umpires: RD Goodger and IH Lock
Player of the match: Michael Dighton

28 November

New South Wales; 7/259 (50 overs)	v	Victoria (H); 4/260 (46.1 overs)
Phillip Hughes 68 (89); Simon Katich 58 (84); Dirk Nannes 3/28 (10 overs)		Robert Quiney 89 (57); David Hussey 80 (89); Nathan Bracken 2/44 (9 overs)

Victoria won by 6 wickets
Melbourne Cricket Ground, Melbourne
Umpires: PR Reiffel and AP Ward
Player of the match: Robert Quiney

1 December

Western Australia; 6/227 (50 overs)	v	Tasmania (H); 7/229 (47.5 overs)
Adam Voges 88 (118); Darren Wates 44 (60); Brendan Drew 2/32 (10 overs)		Michael Dighton 106 (119); Luke Butterworth 32* (30); Danny McLauchlan 4/50 (10 overs)

Tasmania won by 3 wickets
Bellerive Oval, Hobart
Umpires: BJ Muir and BNJ Oxenford
Player of the match: Michael Dighton

5 December

South Australia; 7/203 (39 overs)	v	Queensland (H); 4/159 (28 overs)
Daniel Christian 94* (89); Shane Deitz 32 (43); Michael Kasprowicz 3/38 (7 overs)		Shane Watson 70 (86); James Hopes 61* (49); Jason Gillespie 2/30 (6 overs)

Queensland won by 6 wickets with 6 balls remaining (D/L method)
Brisbane Cricket Ground, Brisbane
Umpires: NS McNamara and JD Ward
Player of the match: James Hopes

9 December

(H) New South Wales	v	South Australia

Match abandoned without a ball bowled
North Dalton Park, Wollongong
Umpires: GA Abood and RJ Tucker

12 December

(H) Queensland; 9/157 (43 overs)	v	New South Wales; 1/58 (15 overs)
Craig Philipson 45 (91); Chris Hartley 31 (60); Dominic Thornely 3/20 (4 overs)		Phil Jaques 26* (46); Daniel Smith 24* (31); Scott Brant 1/24 (6 overs)

New South Wales won by 17 runs (D/L method)
Brisbane Cricket Ground, Brisbane
Umpires: DL Orchard and PR Reiffel
Player of the match: Mark Cameron

15 December

Victoria; 257 (48.4 overs)	v	Tasmania (H); 231 (47.2 overs)
Robert Quiney 78 (95); Aiden Blizzard 46 (42); Brett Geeves 3/49 (9.4 overs)		George Bailey 58 (56); Dane Anderson 46 (64); Dirk Nannes 3/28 (9.2 overs)

Victoria won by 26 runs
Bellerive Oval, Hobart
Umpires: TP Laycock and BJ Muir
Player of the match: Robert Quiney

19 December

South Australia; 3/329 (50 overs)	v	Western Australia (H); 259 (43.5 overs)
Matthew Elliott 146 (141); Mark Cosgrove 70 (68); Steve Magoffin 2/57 (10 overs)		Shaun Marsh 68 (73); Luke Ronchi 57 (45); Nathan Adcock 3/45 (5 overs)

South Australia won by 70 runs
WACA Ground, Perth
Umpires: JK Brookes and IH Lock
Player of the match: Matthew Elliott

23 December

Queensland; 170 (45 overs)	v	South Australia (H); 3/171 (32.1 overs)
Ashley Noffke 45 (64); Lee Carseldine 45 (72); Paul Rofe 2/32 (10 overs)		Matthew Elliott 94 (91); Daniel Harris 34 (52); Aaron Nye 1/22 (6.1 overs)

South Australia won by 7 wickets with 107 balls remaining
Adelaide Oval, Adelaide
Umpires: SJ Davis and SD Fry
Player of the match: Matthew Elliott

18 January

Tasmania; 6/250 (50 overs)	v	Victoria (H); 9/238 (50 overs)
Dane Anderson 48 (78); Daniel Marsh 45 (60); Bryce McGain 3/49 (10 overs)		Robert Quiney 65 (76); John Hastings 31 (27); Ben Hilfenhaus 2/35 (10 overs)

Tasmania won by 12 runs
Melbourne Cricket Ground, Melbourne
Umpires: G Joshua and PR Reiffel

23 January

(H) New South Wales; 7/244 (50 overs)	v	Western Australia; 193 (43.2 overs)
Phillip Hughes 42 (75); Nathan Hauritz 37* (32); Ben Edmondson 2/44 (8 overs)		Shaun Marsh 103 (126); Marcus North 48 (62); Dominic Thornley 3/22 (7.2 overs)

New South Wales won by 51 runs
Sydney Cricket Ground, Sydney
Umpires: GA Abood and JD Ward
Player of the match: Dominic Thornley

27 January

South Australia; 159 (47.3 overs)	v	Victoria (H); 6/160 (32.3 overs)
Graham Manou 41 (72); Ryan Harris 39 (74); Clinton McKay 2/17 (8 overs)		David Hussey 47 (49); Adam Crosthwaite 37 (66); Shaun Tait 3/57 (10 overs)

Victoria won by 4 wickets with 105 balls remaining
Traralgon Showgrounds, Victoria
Umpires: RL Parry and AP Ward

27 January

(H) Tasmania; 9/280 (50 overs)	v	Queensland; 8/284 (46.5 overs)
Travis Birt 71* (70); Mark Divin 63 (66); James Hopes 3/62 (9 overs)		James Hopes 115 (81); Jimmy Maher 114 (108); Mark Divin 4/47 (10 overs)

Queensland won by 2 wickets with 19 balls remaining
NTCA Ground, Launceston
Umpires: SD Fry and SG John

2 February

(H) Western Australia; 9/225 (50 overs)	v	Victoria; 8/226 (49.5 overs)
Marcus North 71 (74); Theo Doropoulos 55 (51); Darren Pattinson 3/14 (7 overs)		Michael Klinger 54 (84); Cameron White 46 (56); Ben Edmondson 4/46 (10 overs)

Victoria won by 2 wickets with 1 ball remaining
WACA Ground, Perth
Umpires: JK Brookes and IH Lock
Player of the match: Darren Pattinson

6 February

Queensland; 214 (48.4 overs)	v	Victoria (H); 3/209 (43 overs)
Chris Simpson 42 (49); Aaron Nye 39 (61); Clinton McKay 3/42 (8.4 overs)		Brad Hodge 119* (134); Cameron White 64* (82); Scott Brant 2/23 (6 overs)

Victoria won by 7 wickets with 24 balls remaining (D/L method)
Melbourne Cricket Ground, Melbourne
Umpires: RL Parry and PR Reiffel
Player of the match: Brad Hodge

13 February

Tasmania; 5/277 (50 overs)	v	South Australia (H); 156 (39.2 overs)
Tim Paine 115 (130); Michael Dighton 44 (70); Nathan Adcock 3/50 (10 overs)		Graham Manou 25 (63); Daniel Harris 24 (18); Xavier Doherty 3/21 (10 overs)

Tasmania won by 121 runs with 64 balls remaining
Adelaide Oval, Adelaide
Umpires: SD Fry and RL Parry
Player of the match: Tim Paine

16 February

Western Australia; 9/242 (50 overs)	v	Queensland (H); 111 (17.5 overs)
Theo Doropoulos 75 (63); Matt Johnston 44 (79); Ashley Noffke 3/27 (10 overs)		Shane Watson 46 (27); Craig Philipson 13 (12); Ben Edmondson 3/21 (4.5 overs)

Western Australia won by 131 runs with 192 balls remaining
Brisbane Cricket Ground, Brisbane
Umpires: TP Laycock and BNJ Oxenford
Player of the match: Theo Doropoulos

20 February

Victoria; 8/352 (50 overs)	v	New South Wales (H); 6/288 (50 overs)
Brad Hodge 116 (113); David Hussey 113 (64); Nathan Hauritz 3/54 (10 overs)		Brad Haddin 52 (69); David Warner 50* (55); Shane Harwood 2/43 (9 overs)

Victoria won by 64 runs
Sydney Cricket Ground, Sydney
Umpires: JK Brookes and RJ Tucker
Player of the match: David Hussey

== Final ==
23 February

Victoria; 158 (37.3 overs)	v	Tasmania (H); 9/131 (30.1 overs)
David Hussey 50 (69); Andrew McDonald 35 (61); Xavier Doherty 4/18 (6.3 overs)		Travis Birt 37* (37); Dane Anderson 25 (22); Bryce McGain 3/11 (5 overs)

Tasmania won by 1 wicket with 5 balls remaining (D/L method)
Bellerive Oval, Hobart
Umpires: PD Parker and RJ Tucker
Player of the match: Brett Geeves

== Statistics ==
=== Highest Team Totals ===
Team	Total	Opponent	Ground
Victorian Bushrangers	8/352	New South Wales Blues	Sydney Cricket Ground
Southern Redbacks	3/329	Western Warriors	WACA Ground
Tasmanian Tigers	5/325	New South Wales Blues	Bellerive Oval
Southern Redbacks	2/308	Western Warriors	Adelaide Oval
Western Warriors	6/305	Southern Redbacks	Adelaide Oval

=== Most Runs ===
Player	Runs	Inns	Avg	100s	50s
Michael Dighton (Tasmania)	549	11	54.90	2	1
Matthew Elliott (South Australia)	521	9	74.42	2	2
David Hussey (Victoria)	484	11	44.00	1	3
Robert Quiney (Victoria)	380	9	47.50	–	4
Travis Birt (Tasmania)	355	11	44.37	–	2

=== Highest Scores ===
Player	Score	Balls	Opponent	Ground	4s	6s
Michael Dighton (Tasmania)	146*	138	New South Wales	North Sydney Oval	13	7
Matthew Elliott (South Australia)	146	141	Western Australia	WACA Ground	14	3
Brad Haddin (New South Wales)	138*	116	Tasmania	Bellerive Oval	10	2
Sean Ervine (Western Australia)	134*	129	South Australia	Adelaide Oval	8	2
Matthew Elliott (South Australia)	133*	137	Western Australia	Adelaide Oval	11	2

=== Most Wickets ===
Player	Wkts	Mts	Avg	SR	5WI
Bryce McGain (Victoria)	15	10	24.40	34.4	–
Brett Geeves (Tasmania)	15	10	25.20	32.6	–
Xavier Doherty (Tasmania)	15	11	25.53	35.8	–
Brendan Drew (Tasmania)	15	11	30.46	33.8	–
Steve Magoffin (Western Australia)	14	9	27.21	32.9	–

=== Best Bowling Figures ===
Player	Overs	Figures	Opponent	Ground
Shane Harwood (Victoria)	9.5	5/45	South Australia	Adelaide Oval
Ryan Harris (South Australia)	9	5/58	Victoria	Adelaide Oval
Xavier Doherty (Tasmania)	6.3	4/18	Victoria	Bellerive Oval
Chris Swan (Queensland)	8	4/24	Western Australia	WACA Ground
Brad Hogg (Western Australia)	10	4/37	Victoria	Melbourne Cricket Ground

== See also ==
- 2007–08 Sheffield Shield season
- 2007–08 KFC Twenty20 Big Bash
- Australian cricket team in 2007–08
