= Showground =

A showground is a place where events occur, including agricultural shows, and associated facilities. In Australia, New Zealand and the United States, showgrounds often house dirt track speedways.

Showground may refer to:

Australia

- Adelaide Showgrounds, in South Australia
- Ballarat Showgrounds, in Victoria
- Bendigo Showgrounds, in Victoria
- Brisbane Showgrounds, in Queensland
- Claremont Showground, in Perth, Western Australia
- Fairfield Showground, in Sydney, New South Wales
- Geelong Showgrounds, in Victoria
- Kiama Showground, in New South Wales
- Melbourne Showgrounds, in Victoria
  - Showgrounds railway station, adjacent to the Royal Melbourne Showgrounds
- Newcastle Showground, in New South Wales
- Redcliffe Showgrounds, in Queensland
- Royal Hobart Showground, in Tasmania
- Sydney Showground (Moore Park), in New South Wales
- Sydney Showground (Olympic Park) in New South Wales
- Sydney Showground Stadium, in New South Wales
- Sydney Showground Speedway, in New South Wales
- The Showgrounds, Wangaratta, in Victoria
- Toowoomba Showgrounds, in Queensland
- Traralgon Showgrounds, in Victoria
- Wangaratta Showgrounds in Victoria
- Wollongong Showground, in New South Wales

Ireland

- RDS Showgrounds, in Dublin
- The Showgrounds (Sligo)

New Zealand

- Addington Showgrounds, in Christchurch
- Epsom Showgrounds, in Auckland
- Palmerston North Showgrounds

United Kingdom

- Agricultural Showgrounds, Frome, in England
- Ballymena Showgrounds, in Northern Ireland
- Balmoral Showgrounds, in Belfast, Northern Ireland
- East of England Showground, in Peterborough, England
- Great Yorkshire Showground, in Harrogate, England
- Kent Showground, in England
- Newark Showground, in England
- Royal Bath and West Showground, in Shepton Mallet, England
- Royal Highland Showground, in Scotland
- Shropshire Agricultural Showground, in England
- The Showgrounds (Coleraine), in Northern Ireland
- The Showgrounds (Limavady), in Northern Ireland
- The Showgrounds (Newry), in Northern Ireland
- Three Counties Showground, in Malvern, England
- South of England Showground, in Ardingly, Sussex

Zimbabwe

- Showground, Bulawayo
