= Kingborough Cricket Club =

Kingborough District Cricket Club
- Founded: 1931
- Home ground: Kingston Twin Ovals
- Colours: Black and Gold
- President: Jeff Ross
- Head coach: Thomas Martyn
- Captain: Dylan Hay
- TCA Titles: 9
- 2014/15: Premiers

Kingborough District Cricket Club (KDCC) also known as the "Kingborough Knights" represent Kingborough in Tasmania's Grade Cricket Competition.

The KDCC fields teams in all Cricket Tasmania Men's and Boy's competitions, in addition to Women's Premier League and Girl's junior competitions.

== Honours ==
Cricket Tasmania Premier League First Grade Premierships: (9) 1940–41, 1946–47, 1957–58, 1971–72, 1996–97, 1997–98, 2006–07, 2008–09, 2014–15

== 2006/07 Premiership Team ==
Adam French (captain), Stuart Clark, David Dawson, Mark Divin, Brady Jones, Tim Scott, Jake Steele, Brad Lovell, Luke Swards, Jason Shelton, Bryce Turnbull and Tom Bevan

== 2007/08 Premiership Team ==
Adam French (captain), Stuart Clark, David Dawson, Mark Divin, Brady Jones, Tim Scott, Rob Davey, Jake Steele, Jason Shelton, Brad Lovell and Bryce Turnbull

== 2014/15 Premiership Team ==
Adam Maher (captain), Jason Shelton, Trent Rollins, Beau Webster, Brady Jones, Chris Bury, Brad Lovell, Clive Rose, Jake Steele, Shane Holland and Jackson Bird

== Notable Past & Current Players ==
- Clive Rose
- Jackson Bird
- David Dawson
- Mark Divin
- Gerard Denton
- Michael DiVenuto
- Chris Matthews
- Umer Rashid
- Steve Stubbings
- Michael Bevan
- Mark Hatton
- Brady Jones
- Beau Webster
- Cameron Wheatley
- Adam Maher
- Jake Weatherald
- Nivethan Radhakrishnan
