= Australian cricket team in 2007–08 =

This article contains information, results and statistics regarding the Australian national cricket team in the 2007–08 season. Statisticians class the 2007–08 season as those matches played on tours that started between September 2007 and April 2008.

== Player contracts ==
The 2007–08 list of contracted players was announced on 1 May 2007. Note that uncontracted players still are available for selection for the national cricket team.

Player	State	Test cap	ODI cap	ODI shirt
Ricky Ponting (captain)	Tas	366	123	14
Adam Gilchrist (vice-captain)	WA	381	129	18
Glenn McGrath	NSW	358	113	9
Cullen Bailey	SA			
Nathan Bracken	NSW	387	142	59
Stuart Clark	NSW	396	153	8
Michael Clarke	NSW	389	149	23
Dan Cullen	SA	397	159	6
Jason Gillespie	SA	370	127	4
Brad Haddin	NSW		144	57
Matthew Hayden	Qld	359	111	28
Ben Hilfenhaus	Tas		161	20
Brad Hodge	Vic	394	154	17
Brad Hogg	WA	367	126	31
James Hopes	Qld		151	39
Michael Hussey	WA	393	150	48
Phil Jaques	NSW	395	158	5
Mitchell Johnson	Qld	398	156	25
Brett Lee	NSW	383	140	58
Stuart MacGill	NSW	374	141	45
Chris Rogers	WA	399		12
Andrew Symonds	Qld	388	139	63
Shaun Tait	SA	392	162	32
Adam Voges	WA		163	24
Shane Watson	Qld	391	148	33
Cameron White	Vic		152	7

== Match summary ==
Format	P	W	L	D	T	NR
Twenty20 International	9	5	4	–	–	–
One Day International	20	11	6	–	–	3
Tests	6	4	1	1	–	–
Total	35	20	11	1	-	3

M = Matches Played, W = Won, L = Lost, D = Drawn, T = Tied, NR = No Result
Last updated 8 March 2008

Tournament Summary

- Australia made the semi-final stage of the 2007 Twenty20 World Championship
- Australia won the Future Cup ODI series against India 4–2
- Australia won the Warne–Muralitharan Trophy against Sri Lanka 2–0
- Australia won the Chappell–Hadlee Trophy against New Zealand 2–0
- Australia won the Border–Gavaskar Trophy against India 2–1
- Australia lost the Commonwealth Bank Series finals against India 2–0

== Twenty20 World Championship ==
Australia's 2007–08 season began with the 2007 Twenty20 World Championship in South Africa. Australia were placed in Group B and their first official match saw them take on Zimbabwe on 12 September 2007 in Cape Town.

To prepare for the tournament, Australia played two warm-up games against New Zealand and South Africa.

=== Unofficial Warm-Up: v New Zealand, 8 September, Benoni ===
8 September
12:00 UTC

New Zealand; 8/182 (20 overs)	v	Australia; 6/187 (18.2 overs)
Craig McMillan 60 (29); Ross Taylor 53 (39); Ben Hilfenhaus 3/11 (3 overs)		Michael Hussey 72 (44); Andrew Symonds 70 (43); Shane Bond 3/26 (3.2 overs)

Australia won by 4 wickets with 10 balls remaining
Willowmoore Park, Benoni
Umpires: Ian Howell & Nigel Llong

Australia were sent in to bowl by New Zealand and early wickets by Ben Hilfenhaus and Brett Lee restricted New Zealand to 4/61 off 9.2 overs. Despite this, a strong partnership of 67 between Ross Taylor and Craig McMillan saw the Kiwis claw their way back. Nathan Bracken claimed the vital wicket of Taylor for 53 and Mitchell Johnson dismissed McMillan for 60 on the last ball of the innings restricting New Zealand to a chaseable 182. Hilfenhaus was the pick of the bowlers for Australia, taking 3/11 off his 3 overs. Nathan Bracken also played a vital role taking 2/34 off his 4 overs.

Australia's innings began poorly with Shane Bond taking the wickets of Adam Gilchrist and Matthew Hayden within 4 deliveries. Brad Hodge was dismissed in the second over leaving Australia reeling at 3–15. A very strong partnership between Andrew Symonds and Michael Hussey rescued Australia, as they put on 113 for the fourth wicket. Despite their dismissals, this partnership was enough to see Australia cruise to victory with ten balls to spare. Hussey top scored for Australia scoring 72 off 44 balls, however Symonds was not far behind scoring 70 off 43 balls.

=== Unofficial Warm-Up: v South Africa, 9 September, Centurion ===
9 September
12:00 UTC

Australia; 8/179 (20 overs)	v	South Africa; 2/183 (19.1 overs)
Andrew Symonds 45 (26); Mitchell Johnson 30* (12); Shaun Pollock 2/16 (3 overs)		Graeme Smith 89* (61); AB de Villiers 65 (35); Ben Hilfenhaus 1/24 (3 overs)

South Africa won by 8 wickets with 5 balls remaining
SuperSport Park, Centurion, Gauteng
Umpires: Asad Rauf & Tony Hill

Australia were sent in to bat by South Africa and were on the back foot early. In the third over of Australia's innings, Adam Gilchrist and Brad Haddin fell in successive balls to South African pace-bowler Shaun Pollock. Brad Hodge fell in the fourth and Australia were in trouble at 3/21 after 3.4 overs. Just as he did in the warm-up against New Zealand, Andrew Symonds steadied the ship scoring a strong 45 off 26 balls. Despite Symonds' resistance, South Africa continued to steadily take wickets, and only a late flurry of powerful hitting by tailender Mitchell Johnson propelled Australia to a healthy target of 8/179.

South Africa's innings got off to a flying start, and despite Ben Hilfenhaus continuing his good warm-up form by dismissing Herschelle Gibbs in the 6th over for 20, Graeme Smith and AB de Villiers put on a partnership of 116 runs which helped guide South Africa to an easy 8 wicket victory.

=== Group B: v Zimbabwe, 12 September, Cape Town ===
12 September
16:00 UTC

Australia; 9/138 (20 overs)	v	Zimbabwe; 5/139 (19.5 overs)
Brad Hodge 35* (22); Andrew Symonds 33 (25); Elton Chigumbura 3/20 (3 overs)		Brendan Taylor 60* (45); Hamilton Masakadza 27 (28); Stuart Clark 2/22 (4 overs)

Zimbabwe won by 5 wickets with 1 ball remaining
Newlands Cricket Ground, Cape Town
Umpires: Asad Rauf & Tony Hill
Player of the match: Brendan Taylor

Twenty20 International Debuts: Mitchell Johnson, Brad Hodge

Australia got their new season off to a poor start, losing their first official match to Zimbabwe. After winning the toss and electing to bat, Australia were off to a shaky start as some tight and effective Zimbabwean bowling had them at 3/19 off 4 overs. Things never really picked up for the Australian batsmen, who appeared to be suffering from a lack of match practice. In slow conditions Brad Hodge did his best to attempt to steer the innings in the right direction, scoring 35 off 22. However regular wickets falling at the other end meant that Australia were restricted to 138 off their 20 overs.

Brendan Taylor was the hero for Zimbabwe, as he remained not out on 60 to see the Zimbabweans home to a memorable victory with only one ball remaining. It was a severe wake up call for a quite complacent Australia and in the post-match interview, captain Ricky Ponting explained that Australia have "got to start respecting [Twenty20] now".

=== Group B: v England, 14 September, Cape Town ===
14 September
12:00 UTC

England; 135 (20 overs)	v	Australia; 2/136 (14.5 overs)
Andrew Flintoff 31 (19); Kevin Pietersen 21 (20); Nathan Bracken 3/16 (4 overs)		Matthew Hayden 67* (43); Adam Gilchrist 45 (28); Andrew Flintoff 1/25 (4 overs)

Australia won by 8 wickets with 31 balls remaining
Newlands Cricket Ground, Cape Town
Umpires: Asad Rauf & Tony Hill
Player of the match: Nathan Bracken

After their shock loss to Zimbabwe, Australia needed to beat England in order to progress through to the Super 8 stage of the tournament. England won the toss and their captain Paul Collingwood sent Australia in to field. The Australians put in a very disciplined performance with the ball, taking wickets at regular intervals and keeping the run rate low throughout the innings. Nathan Bracken and Mitchell Johnson each took 3 wickets, while Stuart Clark and Brett Lee took 2 and 1 respectively. Several of England's batsmen got starts, however failed to convert them with their top scorer being Andrew Flintoff, reaching 31.

Australia cruised to victory on the back of a 79 run opening partnership between Matthew Hayden and Adam Gilchrist. They reached the target within 15 overs and therefore successfully progressed to the Super 8 stage of the tournament.

Australia finished first in Group B based upon net run-rate, and were placed in Group F for the Super 8 stage.

Group B
Pos	Seed	Team	Pld	W	L	NR	Pts	NRR
1	B1	Australia	2	1	1	0	2	0.987
2	B2	England	2	1	1	0	2	0.209
3	B3	Zimbabwe	2	1	1	0	2	−1.196

Source: ESPNCricinfo

=== Group F: v Bangladesh, 16 September, Cape Town ===
16 September
12:00 UTC

Bangladesh; 8/123 (20 overs)	v	Australia; 1/124 (13.5 overs)
Tamim Iqbal 32 (40); Aftab Ahmed 31 (34); Brett Lee 3/27 (4 overs)		Matthew Hayden 73* (48); Adam Gilchrist 43 (28); Shakib Al Hasan 0/15 (2 overs)

Australia won by 9 wickets with 37 balls remaining
Newlands Cricket Ground, Cape Town
Umpires: Asad Rauf & Tony Hill
Player of the match: Brett Lee

Australia's Super 8's campaign got off to an excellent start as they defeated Bangladesh comfortably in Cape Town. After winning the toss, Australian captain Ricky Ponting elected to field first. Australia bowled excellently, tying down the Bangladeshi batsmen, and only allowing them to score at 6 an over. Brett Lee took the first international Twenty20 hat-trick during this innings and finished with figures of 3/27. Bangladesh's innings never gained momentum and Australia restricted them to 123 off 20 overs.

Adam Gilchrist and Matthew Hayden put on their first Twenty20 century partnership to help the Australians chase down the target of 124 comfortably with over 6 overs to spare.

=== Group F: v Pakistan, 18 September, Johannesburg ===
18 September
12:00 UTC

Australia; 7/164 (20 overs)	v	Pakistan; 4/165 (19.1 overs)
Michael Hussey 37 (25); Brad Hodge 36 (29); Sohail Tanvir 3/31 (4 overs)		Misbah-ul-Haq 66* (42); Shoaib Malik 52* (38); Stuart Clark 3/27 (4 overs)

Pakistan won by 6 wickets with 5 balls remaining
Wanderers Stadium, Johannesburg
Umpires: Mark Benson & Nigel Llong
Player of the match: Misbah-ul-Haq

Australia's second Super 8's game was not as successful as their first. Sent in to bat, Australia struggled to find any momentum. While many Australian batsmen got starts, tight Pakistan bowling restricted their scoring chances. Michael Hussey top scored for Australia with 37, and at one point a total of 180 plus even looked possible for Australia. Effective bowling at the death however, restricted Australia to 7/164 off their 20 overs. During this innings, Australian captain Ricky Ponting received a hamstring strain and was ruled out of action for between two and four weeks.

Pakistan's top order had struggled throughout the tournament, and this continued in their innings. Stuart Clark took 3 quick wickets to have Pakistan 4/46 after 6.4 overs. Despite this, an excellent 100 run partnership between Pakistan captain Shoaib Malik and Misbah-ul-Haq rescued Pakistan and guided them home with 5 balls to spare. This loss meant that Australia had to win their next Super 8's match against Sri Lanka in order to progress to the semi-finals.

=== Group F: v Sri Lanka, 20 September, Cape Town ===
20 September
08:00 UTC

Sri Lanka; 101 (19.3 overs)	v	Australia; 0/102 (10.2 overs)
Jehan Mubarak 28 (26); Kumar Sangakkara 22 (23); Stuart Clark 4/20 (4 overs)		Matthew Hayden 58* (38); Adam Gilchrist 31* (25); Dilhara Fernando 0/12 (3 overs)

Australia won by 10 wickets with 58 balls remaining
Newlands Cricket Ground, Cape Town
Umpires: Asad Rauf & Ian Howell
Player of the match: Stuart Clark

With the winner of this match going through to the semi-finals, it was virtually a knockout. Australia won the toss and stand in captain Adam Gilchrist elected to bowl first. This decision was justified as Australia demolished Sri Lanka's top order, having them 7/43 down after 10 overs. While Jehan Mubarak resisted, Sri Lanka were dismissed for a meagre 101 and needed a minor miracle to escape with a victory. Stuart Clark was the pick of the Australian bowlers taking 4/20, the best ever figures by an Australian in Twenty20 Internationals.

Openers Adam Gilchrist and Matthew Hayden once again got the Australians off to a magnificent start, and guided them to a very comfortable 10 wicket victory, the first in the Twenty20 World Championship. As a result of this match, Australia finished second in Group F, and therefore qualified for the semi-finals where they would meet India.

Group F
Pos	Team	Pld	W	L	NR	Pts	NRR
1	Pakistan	3	3	0	0	6	0.843
2	Australia	3	2	1	0	4	2.256
3	Sri Lanka	3	1	2	0	2	−0.697
4	Bangladesh	3	0	3	0	0	−2.031

Source: ESPNCricinfo

=== Semi-final: v India, 22 September, Durban ===
22 September
16:00 UTC

India; 5/188 (20 overs)	v	Australia; 7/173 (20 overs)
Yuvraj Singh 70 (30); MS Dhoni 36 (18); Mitchell Johnson 2/31 (4 overs)		Matthew Hayden 62 (47); Andrew Symonds 43 (26); Sreesanth 2/12 (4 overs)

India won by 15 runs
Kingsmead, Durban
Umpires: Asad Rauf & Mark Benson
Player of the match: Yuvraj Singh

The semi-final stage of the 2007 Twenty20 World Championship saw Australia knocked out by eventual winners India. The Indians won the toss and elected to bat, and after a steady start, an explosive innings by Yuvraj Singh coupled with a quickfire 36 by MS Dhoni saw the Indians reach a strong total of 188 from 20 overs on a batsman friendly Durban pitch. Mitchell Johnson was Australia's best bowler taking 2 wickets in his 4 over spell.

Facing a difficult task to progress to the final, Australia seemed on target to reach India's total after Matthew Hayden once again top scored for the Australians with 62 off 47 balls. It was in the later overs that Australia's chase was dismantled, as the wicket of Andrew Symonds seemed to give the Indians momentum. Australia managed 173 off their 20 overs, and thus India won by 15 runs and knocked Australia out of the tournament.

== Tour of India ==
On 26 September, Australia arrived in India for a 7-game One Day International series, contesting the Future Cup. The first game of the series was played on 29 September 2007, and the tour concluded with a one off Twenty20 International on 20 October 2007.

=== First ODI: 29 September, Bangalore ===
29 September
09:00 UTC

Australia; 7/307 (50 overs)	v	India; 1/9 (2.4 overs)
Michael Clarke 130 (132); Brad Haddin 69 (83); Sreesanth 3/55 (10 overs)		Gautam Gambhir 4* (10); Sachin Tendulkar 0 (6); Mitchell Johnson 1/1 (1 over)

No Result
M. Chinnaswamy Stadium, Bangalore
Umpires: Steve Bucknor & Suresh Shastri

Series was level at 0–0

=== Second ODI: 2 October, Kochi ===
2 October
03:30 UTC

Australia; 6/306 (50 overs)	v	India; 222 (47.3 overs)
Brad Haddin 87* (69); Andrew Symonds 87 (83); Sreesanth 3/67 (9 overs)		MS Dhoni 58 (88); Robin Uthappa 41 (30); Brad Hogg 3/40 (9.3 overs)

Australia won by 84 runs
Nehru Stadium, Kochi
Umpires: Steve Bucknor & Suresh Shastri
Player of the match: Brad Haddin

Australia led the series 1–0

=== Third ODI: 5 October, Hyderabad ===
5 October
03:30 UTC

Australia; 7/290 (50 overs)	v	India; 243 (47.4 overs)
Andrew Symonds 89 (67); Matthew Hayden 60 (70); Irfan Pathan 2/57 (10 overs)		Yuvraj Singh 121 (115); Sachin Tendulkar 43 (71); Brett Lee 3/37 (8 overs)

Australia won by 47 runs
Rajiv Gandhi International Cricket Stadium, Hyderabad
Umpires: Steve Bucknor & Suresh Shastri
Player of the match: Andrew Symonds

Australia led the series 2–0

=== Fourth ODI: 8 October, Chandigarh ===
8 October
03:30 UTC

India; 4/291 (50 overs)	v	Australia; 7/283 (50 overs)
Sachin Tendulkar 79 (119); MS Dhoni 50* (35); James Hopes 2/43 (9 overs)		Matthew Hayden 92 (92); Andrew Symonds 75 (84); Harbhajan Singh 2/43 (10 overs)

India won by 8 runs
Sector 16 Stadium, Chandigarh
Umpires: Steve Bucknor & Suresh Shastri
Player of the match: MS Dhoni

Australia led the series 2–1

=== Fifth ODI: 11 October, Vadodara ===
11 October
03:30 UTC

India; 148 (50 overs)	v	Australia; 1/149 (25.5 overs)
Sachin Tendulkar 47 (73); Zaheer Khan 28 (44); Mitchell Johnson 5/26 (10 overs)		Adam Gilchrist 79* (77); Ricky Ponting 39* (39); R. P. Singh 1/15 (2 overs)

Australia won by 9 wickets with 145 balls remaining
IPCL Sports Complex Ground, Vadodara
Umpires: Aleem Dar & Amiesh Saheba
Player of the match: Mitchell Johnson

Australia led the series 3–1

=== Sixth ODI: 14 October, Nagpur ===
14 October
03:30 UTC

Australia; 8/317 (50 overs)	v	India; 7/299 (50 overs)
Andrew Symonds 107* (88); Adam Gilchrist 51 (47); Zaheer Khan 2/62 (10 overs)		Sourav Ganguly 86 (111); Sachin Tendulkar 72 (72); Brad Hogg 4/49 (10 overs)

Australia won by 18 runs
Vidarbha Cricket Association Ground, Nagpur
Umpires: Aleem Dar & Amiesh Saheba
Player of the match: Andrew Symonds

Australia led the series 4–1

=== Seventh ODI: 17 October, Mumbai ===
17 October
09:00 UTC

Australia; 193 (41.3 overs)	v	India; 8/195 (46 overs)
Ricky Ponting 57 (78); Mitchell Johnson 24* (31); Murali Kartik 6/27 (10 overs)		Robin Uthappa 47 (59); Zaheer Khan 31* (43); Mitchell Johnson 3/46 (10 overs)

India won by 2 wickets with 24 balls remaining
Wankhede Stadium, Mumbai
Umpires: Aleem Dar & Amiesh Saheba
Player of the match: Murali Kartik

Australia won the series 4–2

Man of the Series: Andrew Symonds

=== Twenty20 International: 20 October, Mumbai ===
20 October
09:00 UTC

Australia; 5/166 (20 overs)	v	India; 3/167 (18.1 overs)
Ricky Ponting 76 (53); Michael Clarke 25* (15); Irfan Pathan 2/34 (4 overs)		Gautam Gambhir 63 (52); Robin Uthappa 35 (26); Ben Hilfenhaus 1/28 (4 overs)

India won by 7 wickets with 11 balls remaining
Brabourne Stadium, Mumbai
Umpires: Amiesh Saheba & Suresh Shastri
Player of the match: Gautam Gambhir

== Sri Lanka in Australia ==
Sri Lanka travelled to Australia for a two-match Test series contesting the Warne–Muralitharan Trophy in November. The first Test began in Brisbane on 8 November. On 1 November, a 13-man squad was named by the Australian selectors for the first Test. Phil Jaques was named as a replacement for the retiring Justin Langer while Brad Hogg and Stuart MacGill were selected in place of the retiring Shane Warne. Mitchell Johnson and Shaun Tait were also named in the squad, however Tait pulled out due to an elbow injury and was replaced by Ben Hilfenhaus.

Australia won the inaugural Warne–Muralitharan Trophy 2–0, with Brett Lee winning Man of the Series.

=== First Test: 8–12 November, Brisbane ===
Australian XI: Phil Jaques, Matthew Hayden, Ricky Ponting (c), Michael Hussey, Michael Clarke, Andrew Symonds, Adam Gilchrist (wk), Brett Lee, Mitchell Johnson, Stuart Clark, Stuart MacGill

8–12 November
00:00 UTC
Report

Australia	v	Sri Lanka
4/551 Dec. (151 overs); Michael Clarke 145* (249); Michael Hussey 133 (249); M Muralitharan 2/170 (50 overs)		211 (81.5 overs); Marvan Atapattu 51 (183); Chamara Silva 40 (45); Brett Lee 4/26 (17.5 overs)
		300 (99.2 overs); Michael Vandort 82 (170); Mahela Jayawardene 49 (115); Brett Lee 4/86 (27 overs)

Australia won by an innings and 40 runs
Brisbane Cricket Ground, Brisbane
Umpires: Tony Hill & Rudi Koertzen
Player of the match: Brett Lee

Test Debut: Mitchell Johnson

Australia led the series 1–0

=== Second Test: 16–20 November, Hobart ===
Australian XI: Phil Jaques, Matthew Hayden, Ricky Ponting (c), Michael Hussey, Michael Clarke, Andrew Symonds, Adam Gilchrist (wk), Brett Lee, Mitchell Johnson, Stuart Clark, Stuart MacGill

16 November – 20
23:30 UTC
Report

Australia	v	Sri Lanka
5/542 Dec. (139 overs); Phil Jaques 150 (237); Michael Hussey 132 (220); Dilhara Fernando 2/134 (26 overs)		246 (81.2 overs); Mahela Jayawardene 104 (194); Kumar Sangakkara 57 (76); Brett Lee 4/82 (23.2 overs)
2/210 Dec. (46 overs); Phil Jaques 68 (95); Ricky Ponting 53* (102); Lasith Malinga 1/61 (12 overs)		410 (104.3 overs); Kumar Sangakkara 192 (282); Marvan Atapattu 80 (164); Brett Lee 4/87 (26.3 overs)

Australia won by 96 runs
Bellerive Oval, Hobart
Umpires: Aleem Dar & Rudi Koertzen
Player of the match: Brett Lee

Australia won the series 2–0

Man of the Series: Brett Lee

== New Zealand in Australia ==
New Zealand travelled to Australia in December for a one-off Twenty20 International and the three-match Chappell–Hadlee Trophy.

=== Twenty20 International: 11 December, Perth ===
11 December
09:05 UTC

Australia; 6/186 (20 overs)	v	New Zealand; 132 (18.3 overs)
Andrew Symonds 85* (46); Michael Clarke 33 (26); Mark Gillespie 2/39 (4 overs)		Jacob Oram 66* (31); Scott Styris 18 (15); Ashley Noffke 3/18 (3.3 overs)

Australia won by 54 runs
WACA Ground, Perth
Umpires: Steve Davis & Peter Parker
Player of the match: Andrew Symonds

Twenty20 International Debuts: Luke Pomersbach, Ashley Noffke, Adam Voges, Shaun Tait

=== First ODI: 14 December, Adelaide ===
14 December
03:15 UTC

New Zealand; 7/254 (50 overs)	v	Australia; 3/255 (42.3 overs)
Brendon McCullum 96 (103); Ross Taylor 50 (52); Shaun Tait 3/59 (10 overs)		Ricky Ponting 107* (108); Adam Gilchrist 51 (29); Kyle Mills 2/68 (10 overs)

Australia won by 7 wickets with 45 balls remaining
Adelaide Oval, Adelaide
Umpires: Mark Benson & Steve Davis
Player of the match: Ricky Ponting

Australia led the series 1–0

=== Second ODI: 16 December, Sydney ===
16 December
03:15 UTC

New Zealand; 3/30 (6 overs)	v	Australia
Scott Styris 12* (13); Ross Taylor 5* (8); Brett Lee 2/12 (3 overs)

No result
Sydney Cricket Ground, Sydney
Umpires: Mark Benson and Steve Davis

Australia led the series 1–0

=== Third ODI: 20 December, Hobart ===
20 December
23:00 UTC

Australia; 6/282 (50 overs)	v	New Zealand; 168 (34 overs)
Ricky Ponting 134* (133); Andrew Symonds 52 (63); Jacob Oram 2/34 (10 overs)		Scott Styris 75 (79); Mark Gillespie 24 (24); Brett Lee 3/47 (9 overs)

Australia won by 114 runs
Bellerive Oval, Hobart
Umpires: Mark Benson & Peter Parker
Player of the match: Ricky Ponting

Australia won the series 2–0

Man of the Series: Ricky Ponting

== India in Australia ==
India arrived in Australia in December for a four match test series as well as a one off Twenty20 International and the Commonwealth Bank Series.

=== First Test: 26–30 December, Melbourne ===
Australian XI: Phil Jaques, Matthew Hayden, Ricky Ponting (c), Michael Hussey, Michael Clarke, Andrew Symonds, Adam Gilchrist (wk), Brett Lee, Brad Hogg, Mitchell Johnson, Stuart Clark

26 December – 29
23:30 UTC
Report

Australia	v	India
343 (92.4 overs); Matthew Hayden 124 (183); Phil Jaques 66 (108); Anil Kumble 5/84 (25 overs)		196 (71.5 overs); Sachin Tendulkar 62 (77); Sourav Ganguly 43 (79); Stuart Clark 4/28 (15 overs)
7/351 Dec. (88 overs); Michael Clarke 73 (113); Phil Jaques 51 (103); Harbhajan Singh 3/101 (26 overs)		161 (74 overs); VVS Laxman 42 (112); Sourav Ganguly 40 (78); Mitchell Johnson 3/21 (15 overs)

Australia won by 337 runs
Melbourne Cricket Ground, Melbourne
Umpires: Mark Benson & Billy Bowden
Player of the match: Matthew Hayden

Australia lead the series 1–0

=== Second Test: 2–6 January, Sydney ===
Australian XI: Phil Jaques, Matthew Hayden, Ricky Ponting (c), Michael Hussey, Michael Clarke, Andrew Symonds, Adam Gilchrist (wk), Brett Lee, Brad Hogg, Mitchell Johnson, Stuart Clark

2 January – 6
23:30 UTC
Report

Australia	v	India
463 (112.3 overs); Andrew Symonds 162* (226); Brad Hogg 79 (102); Anil Kumble 4/106 (25.3 overs)		532 (138.2 overs); Sachin Tendulkar 154* (243); VVS Laxman 109 (142); Brett Lee 5/119 (32.2 overs)
7/401 Dec. (107 overs); Michael Hussey 145* (259); Matthew Hayden 123 (196); Anil Kumble 4/148 (40 overs)		210 (70.5 overs); Sourav Ganguly 51 (56); Anil Kumble 45* (111); Michael Clarke 3/5 (1.5 overs)

Australia won by 122 runs
Sydney Cricket Ground, Sydney
Umpires: Mark Benson & Steve Bucknor
Player of the match: Andrew Symonds

Australia led the series 2–0

=== Third Test: 16–19 January, Perth ===
Australian XI: Phil Jaques, Chris Rogers, Ricky Ponting (c), Michael Hussey, Michael Clarke, Andrew Symonds, Adam Gilchrist (wk), Brett Lee, Mitchell Johnson, Stuart Clark, Shaun Tait

16 January – 19
02:30 UTC
Report

India	v	Australia
330 (98.2 overs); Rahul Dravid 93 (183); Sachin Tendulkar 71 (128); Mitchell Johnson 4/86 (28.2 overs)		212 (50 overs); Andrew Symonds 66 (70); Adam Gilchrist 55 (61); RP Singh 4/68 (14 overs)
294 (80.4 overs); VVS Laxman 79 (156); Irfan Pathan 46 (64); Stuart Clark 4/61 (19 overs)		340 (86.5 overs); Michael Clarke 81 (134); Mitchell Johnson 50* (80); Irfan Pathan 3/54 (16 overs)

India won by 72 runs
WACA Ground, Perth
Umpires: Asad Rauf & Billy Bowden
Player of the match: Irfan Pathan

Test debut: Chris Rogers

Australia led the series 2–1

=== Fourth Test: 24–28 January, Adelaide ===
Australian XI: Phil Jaques, Matthew Hayden, Ricky Ponting (c), Michael Hussey, Michael Clarke, Andrew Symonds, Adam Gilchrist (wk), Brett Lee, Brad Hogg, Mitchell Johnson, Stuart Clark

24 January – 28
00:00 UTC
Report

India	v	Australia
526 (152.5 overs); Sachin Tendulkar 153 (205); Anil Kumble 87 (205); Mitchell Johnson 4/126 (37.5 overs)		563 (181 overs); Ricky Ponting 140 (266); Michael Clarke 118 (243); Irfan Pathan 3/112 (36 overs)
7/269 Dec. (90 overs); Virender Sehwag 151 (236); MS Dhoni 20 (44); Mitchell Johnson 2/33 (16 overs)

Match Drawn
Adelaide Oval, Adelaide
Umpires: Asad Rauf & Billy Bowden
Player of the match: Sachin Tendulkar

Australia won the series 2–1

Man of the Series: Brett Lee

=== Twenty20 International: 1 February, Melbourne ===
1 February
08:35 UTC

India; 74 (17.3 overs)	v	Australia; 1/75 (11.2 overs)
Irfan Pathan 26 (30); Gautam Gambhir 9 (6); Nathan Bracken 3/11 (2.3 overs)		Michael Clarke 37* (36); Adam Gilchrist 25 (22); Praveen Kumar 1/15 (2 overs)

Australia won by 9 wickets with 52 balls remaining
Melbourne Cricket Ground, Melbourne
Umpires: Bruce Oxenford & Simon Taufel
Player of the match: Michael Clarke

Twenty20 International Debut: David Hussey

== Commonwealth Bank Series ==
The Commonwealth Bank One Day International series will take place throughout February with the finals series being held in March. This season Australia will take on Sri Lanka and India.

Group stage
Pos	Team	Pld	W	L	T	NR	BP	Pts	NRR	For	Against
1	Australia	8	5	2	0	1	4	26	0.769	1477/329.3	1208/325.2
2	India	8	3	3	0	2	1	17	0.121	1184/248.2	1250/269
3	Sri Lanka	8	2	5	0	1	0	10	−0.949	1167/298.3	1370/282

Source: Cricinfo

=== Match One: 3 February, Brisbane ===
3 February
03:15 UTC

India; 194 (45 overs)	v	Australia; 3/51 (7.2 overs)
Gautam Gambhir 39 (51); MS Dhoni 37 (61); Brett Lee 5/27 (9 overs)		James Hopes 17 (12); Adam Gilchrist 14 (17); Sreesanth 2/17 (3.2 overs)

No Result
Brisbane Cricket Ground, Brisbane
Umpires: Steve Davis & Rudi Koertzen

One Day International debut: Ashley Noffke

=== Match Three: 8 February, Sydney ===
8 February
03:15 UTC

Australia; 6/253 (50 overs)	v	Sri Lanka; 125 (31.3 overs)
Michael Clarke 77* (86); Adam Gilchrist 61 (81); Chaminda Vaas 2/34 (10 overs)		Kumar Sangakkara 42 (41); Chaminda Vaas 18 (30); Nathan Bracken 5/47 (8.3 overs)

Australia won by 128 runs
Sydney Cricket Ground, Sydney
Umpires: Tony Hill & Simon Taufel
Player of the match: Nathan Bracken

=== Match Four: 10 February, Melbourne ===
10 February
03:15 UTC

Australia; 159 (43.1 overs)	v	India; 5/160 (45.5 overs)
Michael Hussey 65* (88); Matthew Hayden 25 (21); Ishant Sharma 4/38 (9.1 overs)		Sachin Tendulkar 44 (54); Rohit Sharma 39* (61); Mitchell Johnson 2/24 (10 overs)

India won by 5 wickets with 25 balls remaining
Melbourne Cricket Ground, Melbourne
Umpires: Rudi Koertzen & Simon Taufel
Player of the match: Ishant Sharma

=== Match Six: 15 February, Perth ===
15 February
04:30 UTC

Australia; 236 (49.4 overs)	v	Sri Lanka; 173 (45.3 overs)
Adam Gilchrist 118 (132); Michael Clarke 43 (69); Lasith Malinga 4/47 (9.4 overs)		Kumar Sangakkara 80 (114); Chamara Kapugedera 26 (60); Nathan Bracken 3/21 (10 overs)

Australia won by 63 runs
WACA Ground, Perth
Umpires: Daryl Harper & Rudi Koertzen
Player of the match: Adam Gilchrist

=== Match Seven: 17 February, Adelaide ===
17 February
03:15 UTC

Australia; 9/203 (50 overs)	v	India; 153 (41.2 overs)
Michael Clarke 79 (108); Brad Hogg 32 (52); Irfan Pathan 4/41 (10 overs)		MS Dhoni 37 (50); Gautam Gambhir 34 (42); Mitchell Johnson 3/42 (10 overs)

Australia won by 50 runs
Adelaide Oval, Adelaide
Umpires: Tony Hill & Peter Parker
Player of the match: Michael Clarke

=== Match Nine: 22 February, Melbourne ===
22 February
03:15 UTC

Australia; 7/184 (50 overs)	v	Sri Lanka; 4/77 (29.3 overs)
Michael Hussey 64* (98); Michael Clarke 50 (69); Farveez Maharoof 2/20 (10 overs)		Mahela Jayawardene 27 (45); Kumar Sangakkara 22 (59); Stuart Clark 2/8 (5 overs)

Australia won by 24 runs (D/L method)
Melbourne Cricket Ground, Melbourne
Umpires: Rudi Koertzen & Simon Taufel
Player of the match: Michael Hussey

=== Match Ten: 24 February, Sydney ===
24 February
03:15 UTC

Australia; 7/317 (50 overs)	v	India; 299 (49.1 overs)
Ricky Ponting 124 (133); Andrew Symonds 59 (49); Sreesanth 2/58 (8 overs)		Gautam Gambhir 113 (119); Robin Uthappa 51 (46); Brett Lee 5/58 (9.1 overs)

Australia won by 18 runs
Sydney Cricket Ground, Sydney
Umpires: Daryl Harper & Tony Hill
Player of the match: Ricky Ponting

=== Match Twelve: 29 February, Melbourne ===
29 February
03:15 UTC

Sri Lanka; 221 (50 overs)	v	Australia; 208 (48.1 overs)
Tillakaratne Dilshan 62 (70); Mahela Jayawardene 50 (66); Nathan Bracken 4/29 (10 overs)		Adam Gilchrist 83 (50); Brett Lee 37 (59); Ishara Amerasinghe 3/44 (10 overs)

Sri Lanka won by 13 runs
Melbourne Cricket Ground, Melbourne
Umpires: Daryl Harper & Tony Hill
Player of the match: Adam Gilchrist

=== Final One: 2 March, Sydney ===
2 March
03:15 UTC

Australia; 8/239 (50 overs)	v	India; 4/242 (45.5 overs)
Matthew Hayden 82 (88); Michael Hussey 45 (67); Harbhajan Singh 2/38 (10 overs)		Sachin Tendulkar 117* (120); Rohit Sharma 66 (87); James Hopes 2/42 (8.5 overs)

India won by 6 wickets with 25 balls remaining
Sydney Cricket Ground, Sydney
Umpires: Daryl Harper & Rudi Koertzen
Player of the match: Sachin Tendulkar

=== Final Two: 4 March, Brisbane ===
4 March
03:15 UTC

India; 9/258 (50 overs)	v	Australia; 249 (49.4 overs)
Sachin Tendulkar 91 (121); Yuvraj Singh 38 (38); Nathan Bracken 3/31 (9 overs)		James Hopes 63 (80); Matthew Hayden 55 (68); Praveen Kumar 4/46 (10 overs)

India won by 9 runs
Brisbane Cricket Ground, Brisbane
Umpires: Tony Hill & Simon Taufel
Player of the match: Praveen Kumar

India won the Commonwealth Bank Series finals 2–0

Man of the Series: Nathan Bracken

== Tour of Pakistan ==
Australia were scheduled do play Tests and One Day Internationals in Pakistan in March and April 2008, however Cricket Australia postponed the tour due to security concerns. The tour will now be played in 2009 and 2010.

== Statistics ==
=== Matches Played ===
The following is a table of statistics charting appearances by Australian cricketers in the 2007–08 season. The minimum requirement for inclusion is one match played. The players will be arranged in alphabetical order.

No.	Player	T20I	ODI	Test	Total
59	Nathan Bracken	9	17	–	26
8	Stuart Clark	7	8	6	21
23	Michael Clarke	8	20	6	34
18	Adam Gilchrist	9	19	6	34
57	Brad Haddin	3	8	-	11
28	Matthew Hayden	7	16	5	28
20	Ben Hilfenhaus	1	-	-	1
17	Brad Hodge	8	7	-	15
31	Brad Hogg	-	17	3	20
39	James Hopes	1	19	-	20
29	David Hussey	1	–	-	1
48	Michael Hussey	8	13	6	27
5	Phil Jaques	-	–	6	6
25	Mitchell Johnson	7	16	6	29
58	Brett Lee	9	18	6	33
45	Stuart MacGill	-	–	2	2
22	Ashley Noffke	2	1	-	3
14	Ricky Ponting	5	18	6	29
16	Luke Pomersbach	1	–	-	1
12	Chris Rogers	-	–	1	1
63	Andrew Symonds	9	20	6	35
32	Shaun Tait	1	3	1	5
24	Adam Voges	2	-	-	2
33	Shane Watson	1	-	-	1

Last updated 8 March 2008

=== Batting ===
==== Twenty20 Internationals ====
The following is a table of statistics charting Australian batsmen in Twenty20 International cricket in the 2007–08 season. The minimum requirement for inclusion is one innings played. The players will be arranged by most runs scored.

Player	Mts	Inns	NO	BF	Runs	Avg	S/R	HS	50s	100s
Matthew Hayden	7	7	3	202	282	70.50	139.60	73*	4	-
Andrew Symonds	9	6	2	135	212	53.00	157.04	85*	1	-
Adam Gilchrist	9	9	1	144	207	25.87	143.75	45	-	-
Ricky Ponting	5	5	1	118	137	34.25	116.10	76	1	-
Michael Clarke	8	5	2	81	98	32.66	120.98	37*	-	-
Brad Hodge	8	5	2	77	94	31.33	122.07	36	–	–
Michael Hussey	8	4	-	76	87	21.75	114.47	37	-	-
Adam Voges	2	1	–	20	26	26.00	130.00	26	-	-
Brett Lee	9	4	2	13	17	8.50	130.77	13	-	-
Brad Haddin	3	3	2	24	16	16.00	66.66	6	-	-
Luke Pomersbach	1	1	-	7	15	15.00	214.29	15	-	-
Mitchell Johnson	7	3	2	7	14	14.00	200.00	9	-	-
Nathan Bracken	9	1	–	3	4	4.00	133.33	4	-	-
Ashley Noffke	2	1	–	0	0	0.00	0.00	0	-	-

Last updated 5 February 2007

==== One Day Internationals ====
The following is a table of statistics charting Australian batsmen in One Day International cricket in the 2007–08 season. The minimum requirement for inclusion is one innings played. The players will be arranged by most runs scored.

Player	Mts	Inns	NO	BF	Runs	Avg	S/R	HS	50s	100s
Matthew Hayden	16	15	-	765	634	42.26	82.87	92	6	-
Ricky Ponting	18	17	3	746	631	45.07	84.58	134*	1	3
Andrew Symonds	20	18	3	647	619	41.26	95.67	107*	5	1
Michael Clarke	20	18	2	793	591	36.93	74.52	130	4	1
Adam Gilchrist	19	18	1	571	581	34.17	101.75	118	5	1
James Hopes	19	16	1	372	349	23.26	93.81	63	1	–
Michael Hussey	13	10	3	409	287	41.00	70.17	65*	2	-
Brad Haddin	8	7	1	312	238	39.66	76.28	87*	2	–
Brett Lee	18	14	6	145	97	12.12	66.89	37	–	–
Brad Hogg	17	7	1	136	85	14.16	62.50	32	-	-
Mitchell Johnson	16	9	4	85	60	12.00	70.58	24*	-	-
Brad Hodge	7	6	-	108	59	9.83	54.62	20	–	–
Nathan Bracken	17	6	2	63	20	5.00	31.74	14*	-	-
Stuart Clark	8	3	2	10	8	8.00	80.00	8*	-	-

Last updated 28 March 2008

==== Tests ====
The following is a table of statistics charting Australian batsmen in Test cricket in the 2007–08 season. The minimum requirement for inclusion is one innings played. The players will be arranged by most runs scored.

Player	Mts	Inns	NO	BF	Runs	Avg	S/R	HS	50s	100s
Michael Hussey	6	10	2	1,129	591	73.87	52.34	145*	–	3
Phil Jaques	6	10	–	1,039	561	56.10	53.99	150	4	2
Michael Clarke	6	9	1	961	532	66.50	55.35	145*	3	2
Andrew Symonds	6	9	3	699	513	85.50	73.39	162*	4	1
Matthew Hayden	5	8	–	826	503	62.87	60.89	124	–	3
Ricky Ponting	6	10	1	718	408	45.33	56.82	140	3	1
Adam Gilchrist	6	8	1	291	217	31.00	74.57	67*	2	–
Brad Hogg	3	5	2	240	148	49.33	61.66	79	1	–
Mitchell Johnson	6	5	3	187	112	56.00	59.89	50*	1	–
Brett Lee	6	7	2	208	86	17.20	41.34	59	1	–
Stuart Clark	6	5	0	73	56	11.20	76.71	32	–	–
Chris Rogers	1	2	0	27	19	9.50	70.37	15	–	–
Shaun Tait	1	2	0	19	12	6.00	63.15	8	–	–

Last updated 29 January 2008

Mts = Matches, Inns = Innings, NO = Not Outs, BF = Balls Faced, Avg = Batting Average, S/R = Batting Strike Rate, HS = Highest Score

=== Bowling ===
==== Twenty20 Internationals ====
The following is a table of statistics charting Australian bowlers in Twenty20 International cricket in the 2007–08 season. The minimum requirement for inclusion is one ball bowled. The players will be arranged by most wickets taken.

Player	Mts	Wkts	Runs	Avg	S/R	Econ	BBI	BBM	Ovrs	5WI	10WM
Stuart Clark	7	12	177	14.75	14.00	6.32	4/20	–	28.0	–	–
Brett Lee	9	11	236	21.45	18.60	6.90	3/27	–	34.1	-	-
Nathan Bracken	9	11	180	16.36	15.7	6.24	3/11	–	28.5	-	-
Mitchell Johnson	7	10	172	17.20	16.20	6.37	3/22	-	27.0	-	-
Ashley Noffke	2	4	41	10.25	11.2	5.46	3/18	–	7.3	-	-
Michael Clarke	8	3	86	28.66	18.00	9.55	1/13	–	9.0	-	-
Adam Voges	2	2	5	2.50	6.0	2.50	2/5	-	2.0	-	-
Shaun Tait	1	2	22	11.00	12.00	5.50	2/22	–	4.0	-	-
James Hopes	1	1	10	10.00	18.0	3.33	1/10	-	3.0	-	-
David Hussey	1	1	12	12.00	18.0	4.00	1/12	-	3.0	-	-
Shane Watson	1	1	19	19.00	20.0	5.70	1/19	–	3.2	-	-
Ben Hilfenhaus	1	1	28	28.00	24.00	7.00	1/28	-	4.0	-	-
Andrew Symonds	9	1	180	180.00	101.00	10.69	1/2	–	16.5	-	-
Brad Hodge	8	0	20	-	-	10.00	-	-	2.0	-	-

Last updated 5 February 2008

==== One Day Internationals ====
The following is a table of statistics charting Australian bowlers in One Day International cricket in the 2007–08 season. The minimum requirement for inclusion is one ball bowled. The players will be arranged by most wickets taken.

Player	Mts	Wkts	Runs	Avg	S/R	Econ	BBI	BBM	Ovrs	5WI	10WM
Brett Lee	18	29	703	24.24	29.60	4.90	5/27	-	143.2	2	-
Nathan Bracken	17	26	629	24.19	32.40	4.47	5/47	-	140.3	1	-
Mitchell Johnson	16	25	571	22.84	32.10	4.26	5/26	-	134.0	1	-
Brad Hogg	17	23	583	25.34	32.60	4.66	4/49	–	125.0	-	-
James Hopes	19	17	450	26.47	40.80	3.88	2/16	-	115.5	-	-
Stuart Clark	8	9	212	23.55	35.70	3.95	2/8	-	53.4	-	-
Michael Clarke	20	6	204	34.00	40.00	5.10	3/52	-	40.0	-	-
Shaun Tait	3	5	89	17.80	21.60	4.95	3/59	-	18.0	-	-
Ashley Noffke	1	1	46	46.00	54.0	5.11	1/46	-	9.0	-	-
Andrew Symonds	20	1	137	137.00	155.0	5.30	1/27	-	25.5	-	-
Brad Hodge	7	0	18	-	-	9.00	-	-	2.0	-	-

Last updated 28 March 2008

==== Tests ====
The following is a table of statistics charting Australian bowlers in Test cricket in the 2007–08 season. The minimum requirement for inclusion is one ball bowled. The players will be arranged by most wickets taken.

Player	Mts	Wkts	Runs	Avg	S/R	Econ	BBI	BBM	Ovrs	5WI	10WM
Brett Lee	6	40	823	20.57	42.2	2.92	5/119	8/112	281.3	1	-
Mitchell Johnson	6	24	771	32.12	62.5	3.08	4/86	6/159	250.1	-	-
Stuart Clark	6	21	651	31.00	64.0	2.90	4/28	6/106	224.2	-	-
Andrew Symonds	6	11	278	25.27	55.6	2.72	3/51	3/70	102.0	-	-
Brad Hogg	3	8	481	60.12	93.7	3.84	2/51	4/133	125.0	-	-
Stuart MacGill	2	5	326	65.20	114.0	3.43	2/81	3/183	95.0	-	-
Michael Clarke	6	4	136	34.00	67.2	3.03	3/5	3/33	44.5	-	-
Shaun Tait	1	0	92	–	–	4.38	–	–	21.0	-	-

Mts = Matches, Wkts = Wickets, Runs = Runs scored off bowler, Avg = Bowling Average, S/R = Bowling Strike Rate, BBI = Best Bowling Innings, Econ = Economy Rate, BBM = Best Bowling Match, Ovrs = Overs Bowled, 5WI = 5 Wickets Innings, 10WM = 10 Wickets Match

=== Catches ===
The following is a table of statistics charting catches taken by Australian fieldsmen in the 2007–08 season. The minimum requirement for inclusion is one catch. The players will be arranged in alphabetical order.

Player	T20I	ODI	Test	Total
Nathan Bracken	3	3	–	6
Stuart Clark	2	1	-	3
Michael Clarke	5	7	9	21
Adam Gilchrist †	16	29	35	80
Brad Haddin †	-	3	–	3
Matthew Hayden	-	7	3	10
Brad Hodge	3	4	–	7
Brad Hogg	-	3	1	4
James Hopes	1	5	–	6
David Hussey	1	-	–	1
Michael Hussey	3	6	12	21
Phil Jaques	-	-	2	2
Mitchell Johnson	2	3	2	7
Brett Lee	5	4	2	11
Ricky Ponting	3	10	9	22
Chris Rogers	-	–	1	1
Andrew Symonds	2	7	1	10
Shaun Tait	-	1	1	2
Adam Voges	1	–	–	1

† Wicketkeeper
Last updated 28 March 2008

== Important events ==
- In the 2007 Twenty20 World Championship, Brett Lee became the first bowler to take a hat-trick in Twenty20 International history. Lee dismissed Shakib Al Hasan, Mashrafe Mortaza and Alok Kapali in consecutive balls to achieve this feat.
- Australian opening batsman Matthew Hayden was the top run scorer of the 2007 Twenty20 World Championship with 265 runs.
- Mitchell Johnson's figures of 5/26 against India in Vadodara were the best One Day International figures by an Australian in India.
- Michael Clarke made his Australian captaincy debut against New Zealand in the Twenty20 International match in Perth on 11 December 2007.
- On 25 January 2008, Adam Gilchrist broke Mark Boucher's world record of 413 for the most dismissals by a wicket-keeper in Test history, catching Anil Kumble off Mitchell Johnson.
- Veteran wicket-keeper Adam Gilchrist announced his retirement from all forms of cricket on 26 January 2008, effective at the conclusion of the Commonwealth Bank Series.
- On 29 January 2008 fast bowler Shaun Tait announced that he would quit cricket for an indefinite period of time due to physical and emotional exhaustion.
- On 26 February 2008 seamer Brett Lee won the Allan Border Medal for his outstanding bowling performance in 2007.
- On 27 February 2008 spinner Brad Hogg announced his retirement from all forms of cricket effective at the conclusion of the Commonwealth Bank Series.

== See also ==
- 2007–08 Sheffield Shield season
- 2007–08 KFC Twenty20 Big Bash
- 2007–08 Ford Ranger One Day Cup season
- International cricket in 2007–08
