= David Dawson (cricketer) =

Australian cricket player

Personal information
- Full name: David Graham Dawson
- Born: 7 March 1982 (age 44); Canberra, Australian Capital Territory
- Nickname: Smokey
- Height: 1.77 m (5 ft 10 in)
- Batting: Right-handed
- Role: Wicketkeeper

Domestic team information
- Years: Team
- 2004/05–2008/09: Tasmania
- 2011/12–2012/13: New South Wales

Career statistics
Competition	First-class	List A
Matches	31	14
Runs scored	1,348	289
Batting average	24.07	24.08
100s/50s	2/5	1/1
Top score	144*	124*
Catches/stumpings	35/0	9/0
- Source: CricInfo, 18 July 2020

David Graham Dawson (born 7 March 1982) is an Australian former cricketer who played for Tasmania and New South Wales. He plays club cricket for Kingborough Cricket Club.

Dawson broke into the Australian first class cricket scene in spectacular fashion when on debut he became the first batsman to ever score a century on debut and carry the bat through the innings at the same time.
