= Cameron Wheatley =

Australian cricketer (born 1992)

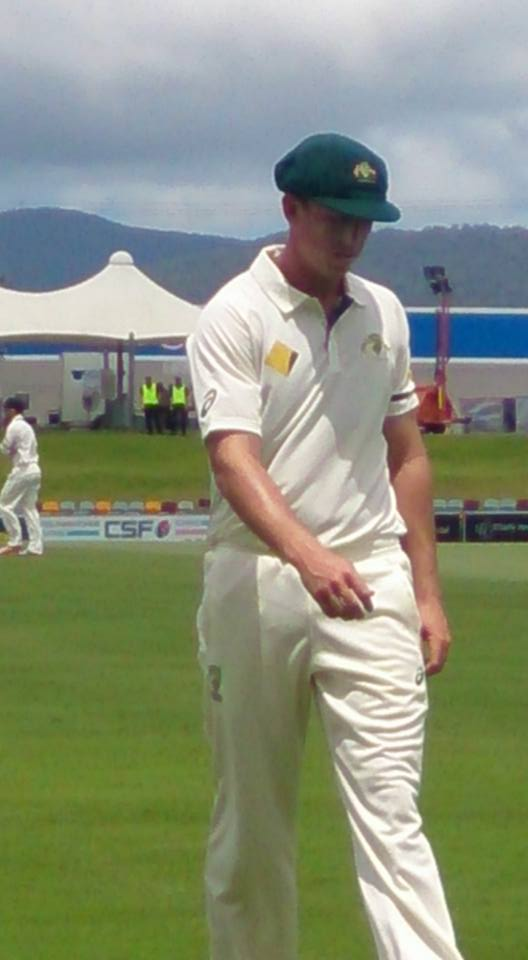
- Cameron Wheatley

Personal information
- Full name: Cameron Keith Robert Wheatley
- Born: 16 April 1992 (age 34); Hobart, Tasmania
- Nickname: Cam Wheatley
- Batting: Right-handed
- Bowling: Right arm Fast medium
- Role: Bowler

Domestic team information
- Years: Team
- 2016/17: Cricket Australia XI
- FC debut: 8 December 2016 Cricket Australia XI v Pakistan

Career statistics
Competition	First-class
Matches	1
Runs scored	0
Batting average	0.00
100s/50s	0
Top score	0
Balls bowled	156
Wickets	2
Bowling average	31.50
5 wickets in innings	0
10 wickets in match	0
Best bowling	2/63
Catches/stumpings	1/–
- Source: Cricinfo, 27 April 2023

Cameron Wheatley (born 16 April 1992) is an Australian cricketer. He made his first-class debut for Cricket Australia XI during Pakistan's tour of Australia on 8 December 2016. He opened the bowling on his first-class debut, finishing with figures of 2/63 for the match. During the second innings of his first-class debut, he was caught at slip after edging the ball to former Pakistan cricket captain Younis Khan. Wheatley was named in Tasmania's 13-man squad for their pink ball 2015–16 Sheffield Shield season match against Queensland. Wheatley earned a full state contract for the Tasmanian Tigers for the 2016–17 season. He played Tasmanian grade cricket for Kingborough Cricket Club.
