= Showground, Bulawayo =

Showground
- Interactive map of Showground

Ground information
- Location: Bulawayo, Matabeleland, Zimbabwe
- Country: Zimbabwe
- Coordinates: 20.1710°S 28.5892°E
- Establishment: c. 1962

Team information
Rhodesia	(1961/62)
- As of 10 December 2013; Source: Ground profile

The Showground was a cricket ground in Bulawayo, Matabeleland, Zimbabwe, attached to the complex known today as the Trade Fair Showgrounds. Today the ground no longer functions for cricketing purposes. A single first-class cricket match was played there in February 1962 when Rhodesia played an International XI. The International XI won the match by six wickets, with the International XI's Hanif Mohammad top-scoring with 80 and Rhodesia's Joe Partridge taking the best figures of the match with 4/54. This remains the only first-class fixture played at the ground and additionally the only recorded match played there.

== See also ==
- List of cricket grounds in Zimbabwe
