= Brady Jones =

Australian cricketer (born 1988)

Personal information
- Born: 16 September 1988 (age 38); Australia
- Height: 1.83 m (6 ft 0 in)
- Batting: Right-handed
- Bowling: Right-arm offbreak
- Role: Wicketkeeper

Domestic team information
- Years: Team
- 2009-2012: Tasmania

Career statistics
Competition	FC	LA
Matches	17	8
Runs scored	274	26
Batting average	17.12	13.00
100s/50s	0/0	0/0
Top score	45*	16*
Balls bowled	0	0
Wickets	0	0
Bowling average	n/a	n/a
5 wickets in innings	0	0
10 wickets in match	0	n/a
Best bowling	n/a	n/a
Catches/stumpings	66/1	12/–
- Source: Cricinfo, 15 October 2012

Brady Jones (born 16 September 1988) is an Australian cricketer who played for Tasmania.

Jones played 17 first class matches, but at the end of the 2011–12 season, his contract with Cricket Tasmania was not renewed. Jones subsequently joined Clarence Football Club and played in the Tasmanian Football League. He was selected for the TFL representative side to play the VFL, becoming the first person to represent Tasmania in both football and cricket in the same year. Jones also won the Lefroy Medal for being the best Tasmanian player in that match.

== See also ==
- List of Tasmanian representative cricketers
