= Dane Anderson =

Australian cricketer (born 1984)

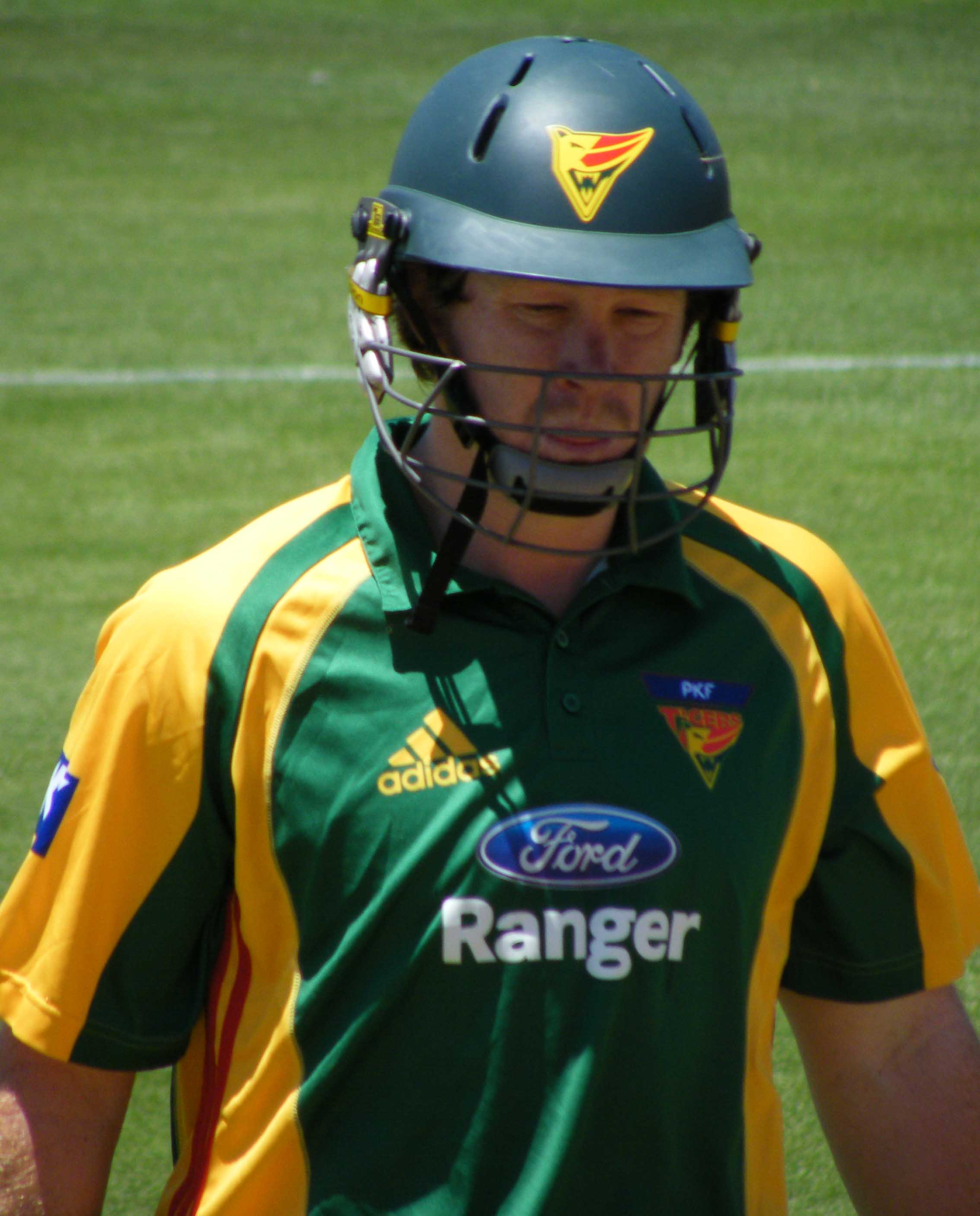

Personal information
- Full name: Dane John Anderson
- Born: 19 October 1984 (age 42); Launceston, Tasmania, Australia
- Nickname: Angry
- Height: 1.80 m (5 ft 11 in)
- Batting: Left-handed
- Bowling: Right-arm off break
- Role: Batsman

Domestic team information
- Years: Team
- 2005/06–2008/09: Tasmania

Career statistics
Competition	FC	LA	T20
Matches	7	24	10
Runs scored	229	585	171
Batting average	19.08	37.85	19.00
100s/50s	0/0	0/1	0/0
Top score	47	79	40
Balls bowled	36	36	–
Wickets	0	1	–
Bowling average	–	35.00	–
5 wickets in innings	–	0	–
10 wickets in match	–	0	–
Best bowling	–	1/22	–
Catches/stumpings	5/–	7/–	3/1
- Source: CricInfo, 18 July 2020

Dane John Anderson (born 19 October 1984) is an Australian former cricketer who played for Tasmania and club cricket for Glenorchy Cricket Club. Anderson is a left-handed batsman and a part-time wicket-keeper, who was a member of the Tasmanian Tigers winning team in the Ford Ranger One Day Cup season 2007-08.
