= Toowoomba Showgrounds =

Toowoomba Showgrounds may refer to the following in Queensland, Australia:

- Toowoomba Showgrounds, Campbell Street, Toowoomba, 1905–1985
- Toowoomba Showgrounds (Glenvale), from 1985
