= Nathan Adcock =

Australian cricketer and lawyer

- Born: Nathan Tennyson Adcock; 22 April 1978 (age 48); Campbelltown, South Australia
- Education: St Peter's College; University of Adelaide
- Occupation: Lawyer
- Cricket career

Personal information
- Nickname: Bowser
- Batting: Right-handed
- Bowling: Right-arm off break

Domestic team information
- Years: Team
- 1997/98–2007/08: South Australia
- FC debut: 15 October 1997 South Australia v Tasmania
- Last FC: 21 January 2008 South Australia v Victoria
- LA debut: 5 October 1997 South Australia v New South Wales
- Last LA: 13 February 2008 South Australia v Tasmania

Career statistics
Competition	FC	LA	T20
Matches	29	45	8
Runs scored	1,190	938	86
Batting average	23.80	25.35	12.28
100s/50s	1/4	0/6	0/0
Top score	114	91*	39
Balls bowled	975	456	84
Wickets	13	12	7
Bowling average	45.46	35.83	15.57
5 wickets in innings	0	0	0
10 wickets in match	0	0	0
Best bowling	3/30	3/45	3/19
Catches/stumpings	34/–	22/–	1/–
- Source: ESPNcricinfo, 5 March 2018

Nathan Tennyson Adcock (born 22 April 1978) is a lawyer and former professional cricketer who played for the South Australia cricket team, who he captained for part of the 2007–08 season before being replaced with Graham Manou and dropped from South Australia's squad altogether.

== Education ==
Adcock was educated at St Peter's College, Adelaide where he completed matriculation in 1995. He was invited back to serve as School Captain in 1996. He commenced a commerce/law degree in 1997 at the University of Adelaide, however his burgeoning first-class cricket career meant it took him a little longer than average to complete the two programs. He graduated from the law school in 2004, and was admitted to practice law that same year.

== Career ==
Adcock commenced working for Hunt & Hunt Lawyers, whilst captaining the Adelaide University first grade cricket side and remaining a member of South Australia's state squad.

Adcock placed his legal career on hold when on 28 August 2007, he was named as captain of the South Australian cricket team replacing Darren Lehmann who had stepped down. The previous season Adcock only played only four first-class matches however he topped SA's first-class averages with 324 runs at 46. When he was appointed captain, the team's coach Mark Sorell stated that he was guaranteed to play every match for South Australia in the 2007/08 season. However, midway through the season, he suffered a form slump, averaging less than 20, and was replaced as captain by Graham Manou. At the end of the season, Adcock was not offered a new contract.

In 2009, Adcock joined law firm Fenwick Elliott Grace with his principal area of practice being construction and engineering. A commercial lawyer, He later became a partner at Lynch Meyer.

== Other ==
He was appointed as a board member of the South Australian Cricket Association in May 2014.
