= Traralgon Showgrounds =

Cricket ground in Traralgon, Victoria, Australia

Coordinates: 38°11′56.76″S 146°32′45.16″E

Traralgon Showground
Ground information
- Location: Traralgon, Australia
- Establishment: 1978 (first recorded match)

Team information
Victoria	(2008)
- As of 21 October 2011; Source: Ground profile

Traralgon Showground is a cricket ground in Traralgon, Victoria, Australia. The first recorded match held on the ground came when WSC Australia played WSC Cavaliers in the 1978 World Series Cricket. A List A match was held there in the 2007–08 Ford Ranger Cup between Victoria and South Australia, which Victoria won by 4 wickets.
