= Aaron Nye =

Australian cricketer (born 1978)

Personal information
- Full name: Aaron James Nye
- Born: 9 November 1978 (age 48); Herston, Queensland, Australia
- Batting: Right-handed
- Bowling: Right-arm medium Right arm offbreak
- Role: Batter

Domestic team information
- Years: Team
- 2003/04–2008/09: Queensland
- FC debut: 4 March 2004 Queensland v New South Wales
- Last FC: 7 March 2008 Queensland v Victoria
- LA debut: 10 October 2004 Queensland v New South Wales
- Last LA: 14 December 2008 Queensland v Tasmania

Career statistics
Competition	FC	LA	T20
Matches	8	20	7
Runs scored	380	330	33
Batting average	29.23	19.41	6.60
100s/50s	1/2	0/0	0/0
Top score	102	43	20
Balls bowled	278	331	78
Wickets	5	8	7
Bowling average	35.00	34.50	16.14
5 wickets in innings	0	0	0
10 wickets in match	0	0	0
Best bowling	2/89	3/55	3/26
Catches/stumpings	9/–	6/–	4/–
- Source: CricInfo, 22 January 2022

Aaron James Nye (born 9 November 1978 in Brisbane, Queensland) is a professional Australian cricketer who played for Queensland between 2004 and 2008. He made his first-class debut for Queensland in March 2004 against New South Wales. Nye was not offered a Queensland contract ahead of the 2009–2010 season.
