= Michael Dighton =

Australian cricket player

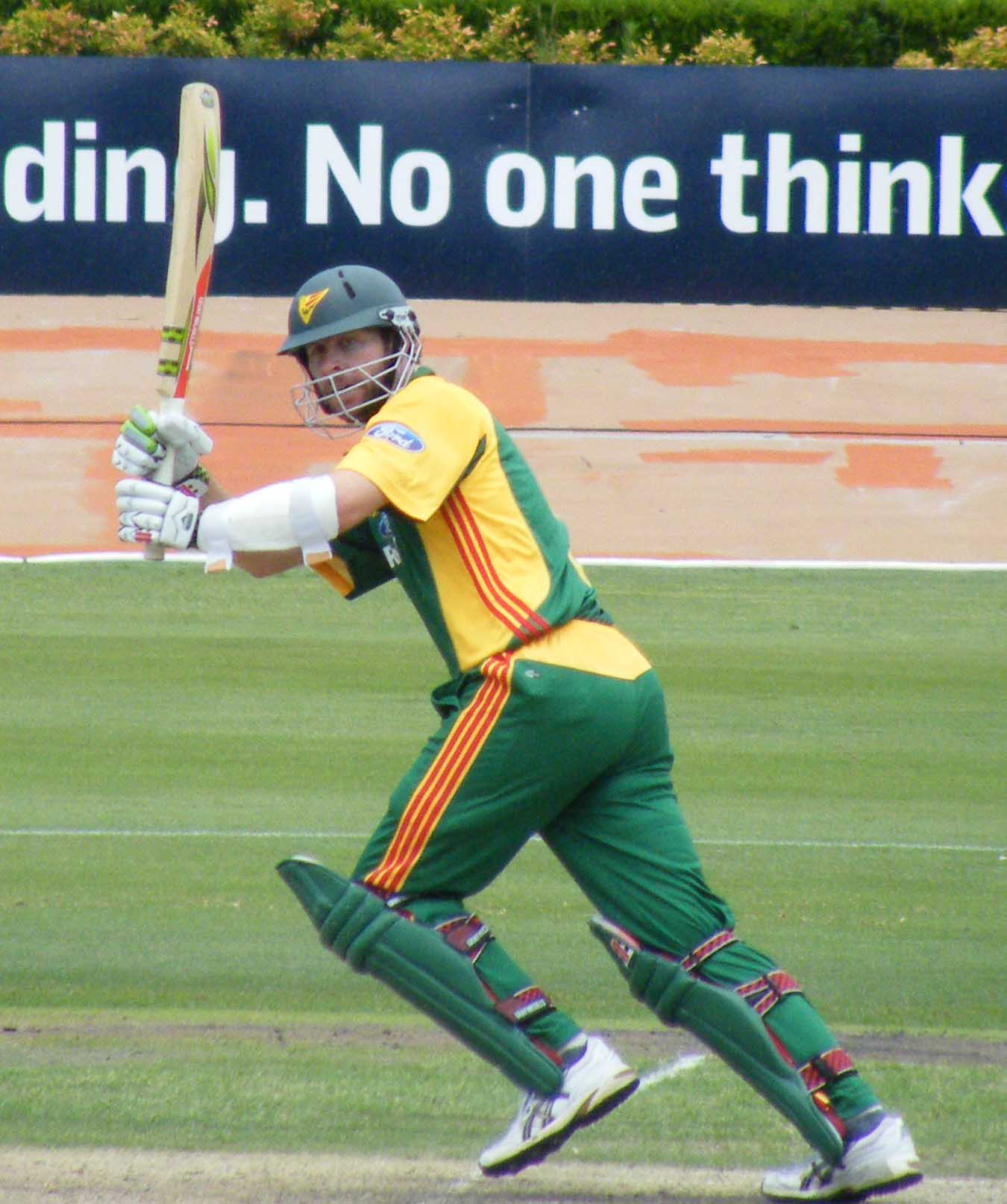

Personal information
- Full name: Michael Gray Dighton
- Born: 24 April 1976 (age 50); Toowoomba, Queensland, Australia
- Nickname: Dights
- Height: 1.93 m (6 ft 4 in)
- Batting: Right-handed
- Bowling: Right-arm medium-fast
- Role: Batsman

Domestic team information
- Years: Team
- 1997/98–2000/01: Western Australia
- 2001/02–2009/10: Tasmania (squad no. 3)
- 2004: Hampshire County Cricket Club
- 2007: Derbyshire County Cricket Club

Head coaching information
- Years: Team
- 2011–2012: Canada

Career statistics
Competition	FC	LA	T20
Matches	71	99	22
Runs scored	4,208	3,190	455
Batting average	33.93	33.57	23.94
100s/50s	8/21	4/23	1/0
Top score	182*	146*	111
Balls bowled	570	522	96
Wickets	6	15	9
Bowling average	53.66	30.80	13.44
5 wickets in innings	0	0	1
10 wickets in match	0	0	0
Best bowling	2/47	2/23	6/25
Catches/stumpings	50/–	34/1	6/–
- Source: CricInfo, 18 July 2020

Michael Gray Dighton (born 24 April 1976) is an Australian cricket coach and former player. He played domestic cricket for Western Australia and Tasmania as well as English county cricket for Hampshire and Derbyshire. He was head coach of Canada from 2011 to 2012.

== Playing career ==
Dighton was educated at Kent Street Senior High School in Perth . He began his career with the Western Warriors but later switched to the Tasmanian Tigers. He plays club cricket for North Hobart Cricket Club. He was an opening batsman, particularly in One-day cricket, and played a leading role in the Tigers victorious ING Cup campaign of 2004–05. He bowled occasional leg spin, and was also a wicket-keeper. Dighton failed to recapture the form which saw him score at an average of 55 in 2003 in the Pura Cup, but still retained his place as one-day opener.

In 2007, he recorded the best bowling figures by a bowler on T20 debut (6-25) and was the only debutant to take a 6-wicket haul on T20 debut.

On 15 November 2008, Dighton scored 34 off 13 balls for the Emirates All*Stars against the Australian national team in an exhibition Twenty/20 match. He and Adam Gilchrist scored quickly, hitting boundaries and helping the team (specially made for the occasion) on to win. During the fielding innings, he caught a surprising one-handed catch in the deep to dismiss Cameron White.

== Coaching career ==
Dighton was appointed head coach of the Canada national cricket team in September 2011. He resigned in April 2012 after the team failed to progress through the 2012 ICC World Twenty20 Qualifier.
