= Bryce McGain =

Australian cricketer

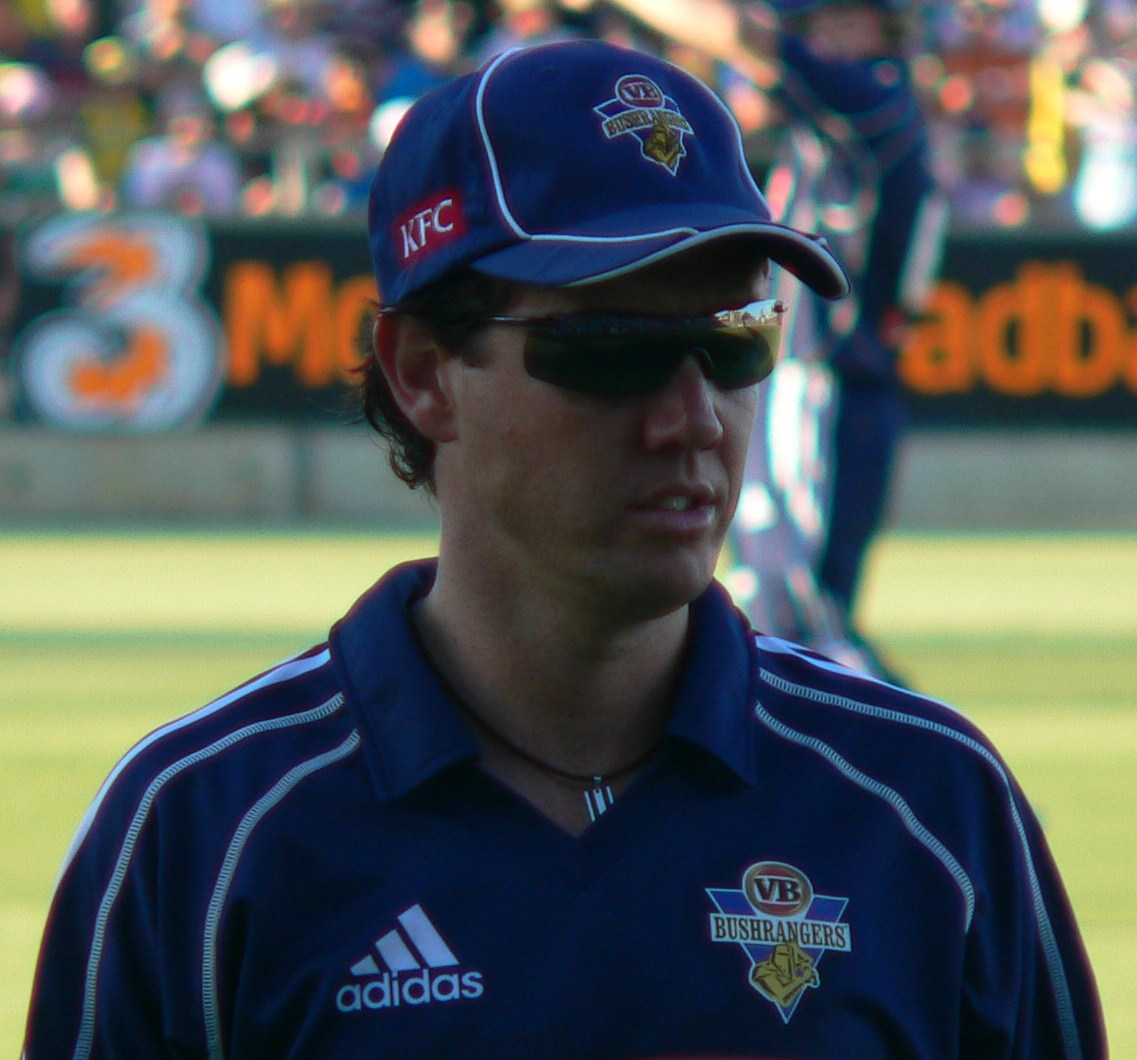
- Bryce during the 2007/08 Twenty20 Final at the WACA ground.

Personal information
- Full name: Bryce Edward McGain
- Born: 25 March 1972 (age 54); Mornington, Victoria, Australia
- Height: 1.82 m (6 ft 0 in)
- Batting: Right-handed
- Bowling: Right-arm leg-break and googly
- Role: Bowler

International information
- National side: Australia
- Only Test (cap 410): 19 March 2009 v South Africa

Domestic team information
- Years: Team
- 2001/02–2010/11: Victoria
- 2002: Denmark
- 2010: Essex
- 2011/12: Adelaide Strikers

Career statistics
Competition	Test	FC	LA	T20
Matches	1	33	26	13
Runs scored	2	248	97	11
Batting average	1.00	10.78	19.40	11.00
100s/50s	0/0	0/0	0/1	0/0
Top score	2	25	51	6*
Balls bowled	108	6,321	1320	271
Wickets	0	101	34	14
Bowling average	–	35.48	31.20	25.42
5 wickets in innings	–	5	0	0
10 wickets in match	–	0	0	0
Best bowling	–	6/112	3/11	2/10
Catches/stumpings	0/–	13/–	9/–	4/–
- Source: CricketArchive, 1 February 2013

Bryce Edward McGain (born 25 March 1972) is an Australian former cricketer who played a single Test match for the Australia national cricket team, as well as domestically for Victoria. McGain made his first-class debut in 2002 against New South Wales at the Sydney Cricket Ground. However, due to other Victorian spinners—Shane Warne and Cameron White—he was unable to hold down a place in the side. He worked in the IT section of a bank and played Victorian Premier Cricket for Prahran Cricket Club before being called up to the Victorian side again.

McGain became a regular for Victoria in the 2007 season and took 38 wickets at 34.78. This led spin mentor Terry Jenner to suggest that McGain could be selected in the Australian Test team for the 2007–08 home series against India. Although this predicted selection did not happen, McGain was later selected for the 2008–09 four-Test tour of India after playing for Australia A in India in September 2008. During this tour, he played in a 2-day tour match against Rajasthan Cricket Association XI, but he did not get to bat or bowl. He had to return home due to a shoulder injury after having only played in this one tour match.

McGain made his Test debut at the age of 36 at Newlands in Cape Town in the third Test against South Africa in March 2009. In his Test debut he conceded 0/149 from 18 overs, the worst figures returned by an Australian in a Test match at that time, and as of 2025, 2nd to Mitchell Swepson's 0/156 from 53.4 overs in 2022 against Pakistan. The South African batsmen targeted him for attack and hit many sixes from his bowling. He made two in the first innings and was run out for a duck in the second.

Bryce was also a local Australian Rules footballer, playing at the Silvan Football Club in the YVMDFL between 1996 and 2001, playing 82 games and kicking 93 goals. A midfielder, Bryce won three club senior Best & Fairest's in 1997, 1999 and 2000. Along with the YVMDFL 2000 Senior League Best & Fairest award. Bryce was also inducted into Silvan's "Team of Century" in 2002.
