= Mark Divin =

Australian cricketer (born 1980)

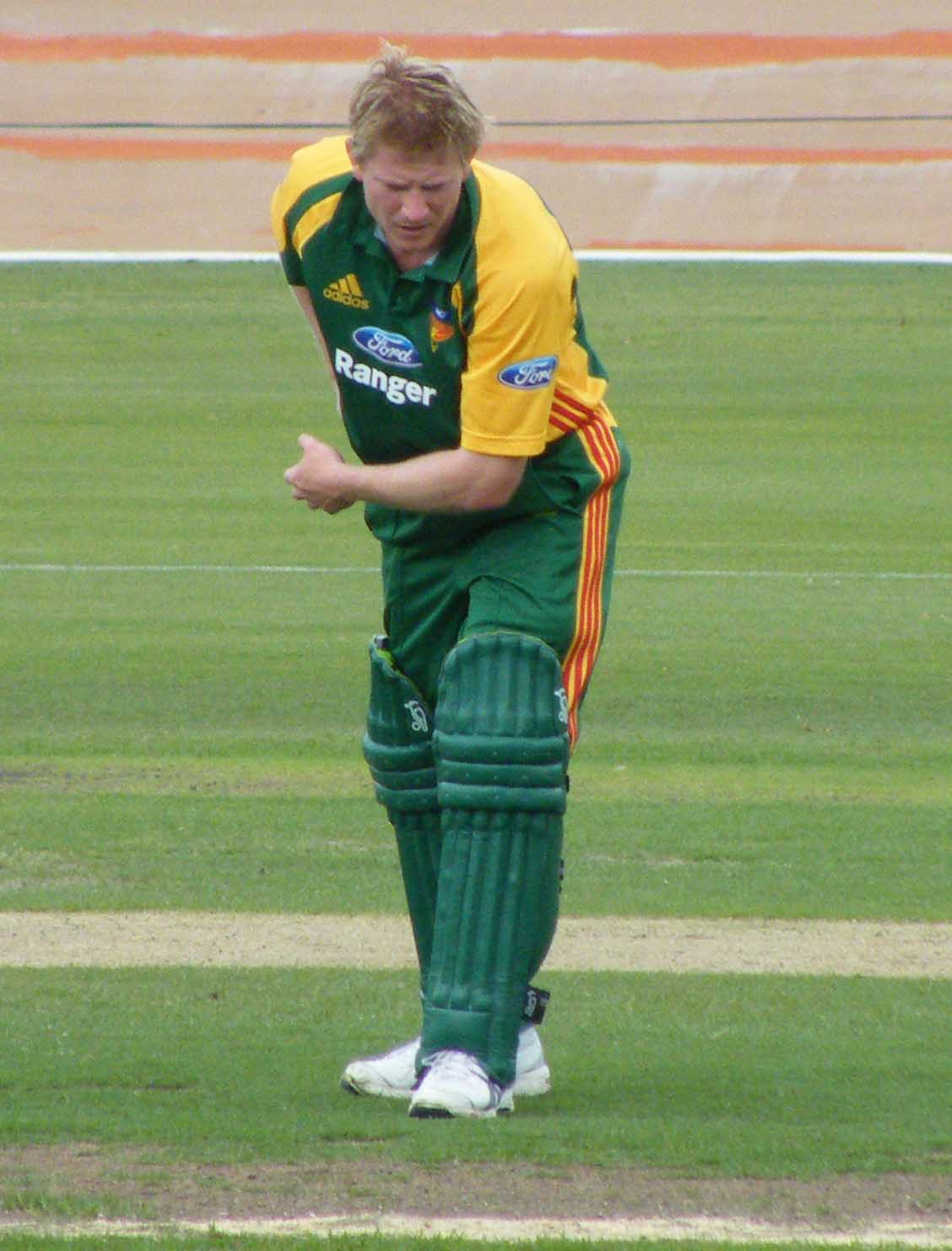

Personal information
- Full name: Mark Andrew Divin
- Born: 6 February 1980 (age 46); Footscray, Melbourne, South Australia

Domestic team information
- Years: Team
- 2007/08–2008/09: Tasmania

Career statistics
Competition	List A	Twenty20
Matches	13	8
Runs scored	222	29
Batting average	22.20	7.25
100s/50s	0/1	0/0
Top score	63	7
Balls bowled	540	174
Wickets	12	6
Bowling average	35.41	42.50
5 wickets in innings	0	0
10 wickets in match	0	0
Best bowling	4/47	1/23
Catches/stumpings	4/–	3/–
- Source: CricInfo, 18 July 2020

Mark Andrew Divin (born 6 February 1980) is an Australian former professional cricketer who played for Tasmania.
