= Shaun Tait =

Australian cricketer (born 1983)

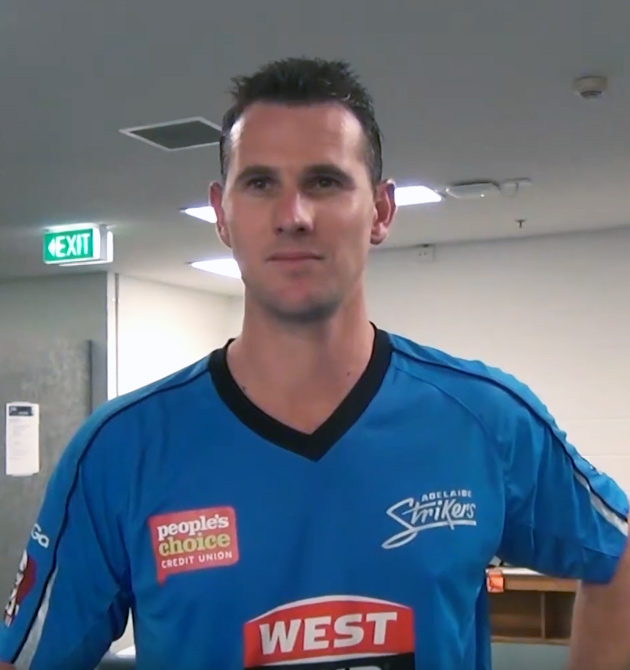
- Tait in 2013

Personal information
- Full name: Shaun William Tait
- Born: 22 February 1983 (age 43); Nairne, South Australia
- Nickname: Sloon, Wild Thing
- Height: 1.93 m (6 ft 4 in)
- Batting: Right-handed
- Bowling: Right-arm fast
- Role: Bowler

International information
- National side: Australia (2004–2016)
- Test debut (cap 392): 25 August 2005 v England
- Last Test: 16 January 2008 v India
- ODI debut (cap 162): 2 February 2007 v England
- Last ODI: 24 March 2011 v India
- ODI shirt no.: 32
- T20I debut (cap 27): 11 December 2007 v New Zealand
- Last T20I: 31 January 2016 v India

Domestic team information
- Years: Team
- 2002/03–2014/15: South Australia
- 2004: Durham
- 2010–2013: Rajasthan Royals
- 2010, 2016: Glamorgan
- 2011/12: Mid West Rhinos
- 2011/12: Melbourne Renegades
- 2012/13–2013/14: Wellington
- 2012/13–2014/15: Adelaide Strikers
- 2013: Chittagong Kings
- 2013, 2015: Essex
- 2015/16–2016/17: Hobart Hurricanes
- 2016: Peshawar Zalmi

Career statistics
Competition	Test	ODI	FC	LA
Matches	3	35	50	101
Runs scored	20	250	509	110
Batting average	6.66	12.50	12.41	6.11
100s/50s	0/0	0/0	0/2	0/0
Top score	8	16	68	22*
Balls bowled	414	1688	9263	5,063
Wickets	5	62	198	182
Bowling average	60.40	23.56	28.59	23.84
5 wickets in innings	0	0	7	3
10 wickets in match	0	0	1	0
Best bowling	3/97	4/39	7/29	8/43
Catches/stumpings	1/–	48/–	65/–	23/–
Medal record
Men's Cricket
Representing Australia
ICC Cricket World Cup
Winner	2007 West Indies
- Source: ESPNcricinfo, 10 May 2019

Shaun Tait (born 22 February 1983) is an Australian cricket coach and former cricketer. He played as a right arm fast bowler and represented Australia in all three forms of cricket, but had most success in One Day Internationals, in which he was a member of Australia's undefeated team at the 2007 Cricket World Cup, and Twenty20 cricket. Tait won four different awards throughout his career including the Bradman Young Cricketer of the Year in 2004. He is considered one of the fastest bowlers of all time. He was appointed as the bowling coach of the Bangladesh national cricket team in February 2022. He also served as the bowling coach of Pakistan national cricket team between 2022 and 2023 and then since 2026.

Tait retired from Test cricket in 2009, and later from One Day Internationals in March 2011, to concentrate on playing T20 cricket. In March 2017, Tait announced his retirement from all forms of cricket.

== Domestic career ==
Tait played for South Australia throughout his first-class career, also playing for Australia A and, in 2004, for Durham County Cricket Club in England. He took almost 200 first-class wickets after making his first-class debut at the age of 19 against Western Australia in December 2002 at Adelaide Oval. He only bowled in one innings on debut, taking three wickets for the cost of 77 runs (3/77) from 22.2 overs. Tait played five matches during his first season, taking 20 wickets at a bowling average of 22.55 runs per wicket. He made his List A debut in February 2003 and as a result of his strong first season, was awarded a place at the Australian Cricket Academy alongside players such as Ben Hilfenhaus and Luke Ronchi.

Tait was South Australia's leading wicket taker, and the second leading wicket taker overall in the 2003–04 ING Cup with 18 wickets at an average of 19.61. The highlight of his season was his record-breaking haul of 8/43 against Tasmania on 9 January 2004. These were the best figures by an Australian in List A cricket, and the eighth-best List A figures of all time. He was selected in the Australia A team to take on the touring India team. He took 3/85 in the Indians' first innings. He once again had a strong Sheffield Shield season, taking 30 wickets at an average of 28.33 and he was awarded the Bradman Young Cricketer of the Year award.

In July 2004, Tait was signed by Durham County Cricket Club for the second half of the English County Championship season. His first match was against a Somerset team captained by fellow Australian Ricky Ponting, although he did not take a wicket and bowled 21 no balls in his 12 overs. Tait only played one more first-class match for Durham before returning to Australia.

Tait was awarded his first Cricket Australia central-contract for the 2004–05 season, being included ahead of Queensland fast bowler Andy Bichel. Tait repaid the selectors' faith in him by having his best season to date; he took 65 first-class wickets at an average of 20.16, surpassing Clarrie Grimmett's record for most wickets in a season for a South Australian bowler.

After missing the opening half of the 2005–06 domestic season with an injury to his right shoulder, sustained on the Ashes tour, Tait struggled on his return, taking only 14 wickets at 38.35 in the four matches in which he was able to play. Despite this, he was still named as part of the Australia A squad to play in the 2006 Top End Series. A strong season in 2006–07, taking 29 wickets at 27.10, saw him win the Lord Hampden Trophy for South Australia's player of the season.

An elbow injury kept Tait out for the opening parts of the 2007–08 Sheffield Shield season, however, upon recovery, a match against Queensland at the Brisbane Cricket Ground saw him take his first 10-wicket haul. He took 3/69 in the first innings and 7/29 in the second, his best first-class figures.

== International career ==
Tait was named in Australia's Test squad to tour Sri Lanka in 2004 as a replacement for the injured Brett Lee, although he did not play in a Test on the tour. After an impressive domestic summer, in April 2005 he was named in Australia's squad to tour England for the 2005 Ashes series and made his Test match debut against England on 25 August 2005 at Trent Bridge in the fourth match of the series. Some suggested that Tait should have played in the first Test of the series, but an injury to Glenn McGrath and the poor form of Jason Gillespie gave Tait his chance later in the series. Tait bowled 24 overs and took 3/97 in his first innings, the best figures of any Australian fast bowler in the match. While he went wicketless in the second innings, he held his spot to play in the final Test of the Ashes series at The Oval, taking 1/61 in the first innings and 1/28 in the second.

A shoulder injury ahead of the Super Series against the ICC World XI, saw Tait ruled out of playing and despite calls from Jason Gillespie and Ian Chappell for his inclusion in the team for the 2006–07 Ashes series in Australia, he did not get a place in the team with the selectors opting for Stuart Clark.

Tait made his One Day International debut in February 2007 against England at the Sydney Cricket Ground in the 2006–07 Commonwealth Bank Series. Later that month, he was selected as a part of Australia's squad to take on New Zealand for the 2006–07 Chappell–Hadlee Trophy in New Zealand. Tait was selected for the final two games of the series, taking two wickets as New Zealand chased down scores of over 300 twice and whitewashed a strong Australian team.

Tait was selected in Australia's 15-man squad for the 2007 Cricket World Cup in the West Indies. Although he was not expected to play a major role in the Australian team, an injury to Brett Lee meant that a relatively inexperienced Tait assumed Lee's mantle as the spearhead of the bowling attack. Despite the added pressure, Tait performed to much acclaim in the World Cup, finishing the tournament as the equal second leading wicket-taker with 23 wickets at an average of 20.30. This included a Player of the Match performance against England in which he claimed 3/41, and taking 4/39 against a strong South African team in the semi-final. He went wicketless in a rain affected final against Sri Lanka, but Australia won the tournament in what was described as the "most dominant campaign" by a team in World Cup history.

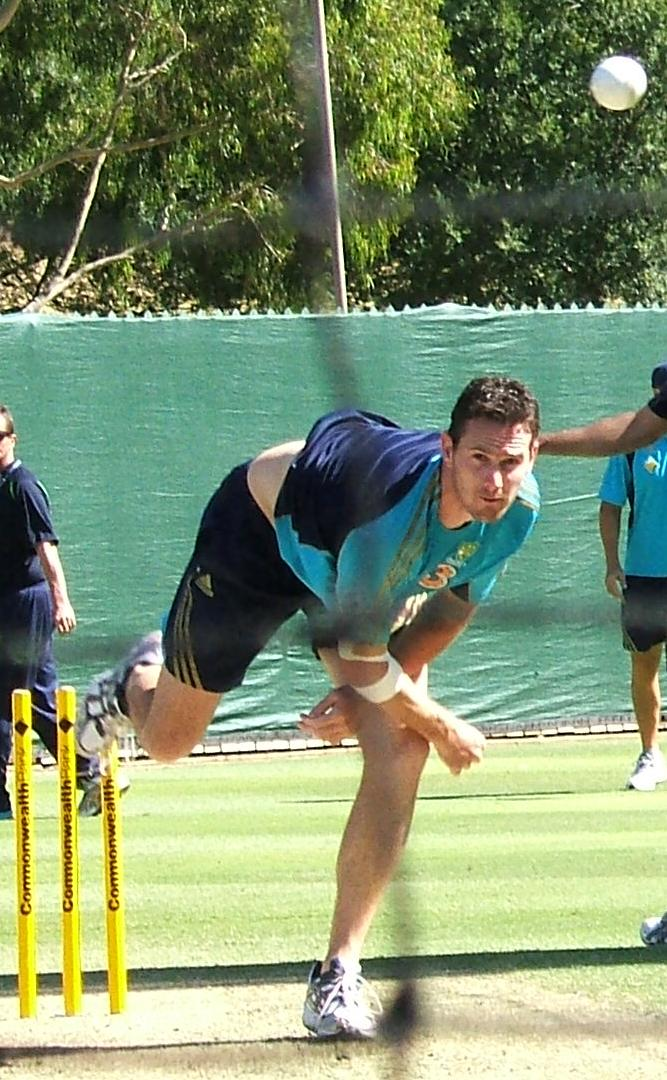
Tait bowling in the Adelaide Oval nets, January 2009

Tait was selected in the 13-man squad for Sri Lanka's tour of Australia in November 2007, however his ongoing elbow injury forced him out, being replaced by Ben Hilfenhaus. Having returned to fitness in December, he once again earned a spot in the Australian squad, this time for the series against India. While there was some suggestion that Australia might use Tait in a four pronged pace-attack as early as the first Test, spinner Brad Hogg was selected over Tait for the first two Tests. Tait was eventually chosen in place of Hogg for the third Test, with the WACA wicket expected to suit his fast bowling. He went wicketless; his claims to "bowl over" the Indian team had backfired and he announced that he would take an indefinite break from cricket after the match.

=== Sabbatical ===
In January 2008, Tait announced that he would take an indefinite break from cricket, citing being physically and emotionally exhausted. He stated, "A break from professional cricket will hopefully give me a clear mind and a chance for my body to rest and recover." In March he said he was "feeling normal again" and was aiming for a comeback at the start of the 2008–09 season. He was awarded a central-contract for the season.

In February 2009, the Rajasthan Royals of the Indian Premier League bought Tait, although he later withdrew from the tournament following an injury. In May 2009 Cricket Australia announced that Tait would not have his contract renewed for the 2009–10 season. Tait described this as "a kick in the teeth". Following the withdrawal of Andrew Symonds' contract after he was sent back from Britain before the 2009 ICC World Twenty20, Tait was given a replacement contract.

=== 2010 to retirement ===
In 2009, Tait gave up first-class cricket indefinitely to focus on the shorter forms of the game. He played in Australia's one-day squad in 2010 and rejoined the Australian one-day squad for the 2011 Cricket World Cup, playing in seven games and taking 11 wickets before the team lost to India in the quarter-finals. Following Australia's exit from the tournament, Tait announced his retirement from 50-over cricket, stating that he intended to focus on playing Twenty20 cricket.

He played in the Indian Premier League for Rajasthan between 2010 and 2013, in the Australian Big Bash League for Melbourne Renegades, Adelaide Strikers and Hobart Hurricanes, in the United Kingdom for Glamorgan and Essex County Cricket Clubs and for teams in a number of other leagues around the world until his retirement from cricket in 2017. During the 2015–16 Big Bash season, he bowled an economical spell of 3/16 for Hobart and was recalled to the national team for the T20 International series against India, but missed selection for the 2016 ICC World Twenty20 after failing to take a wicket in the two matches he played. Tait announced his retirement from playing in March 2017 due to a chronic elbow injury.

== Coaching career ==
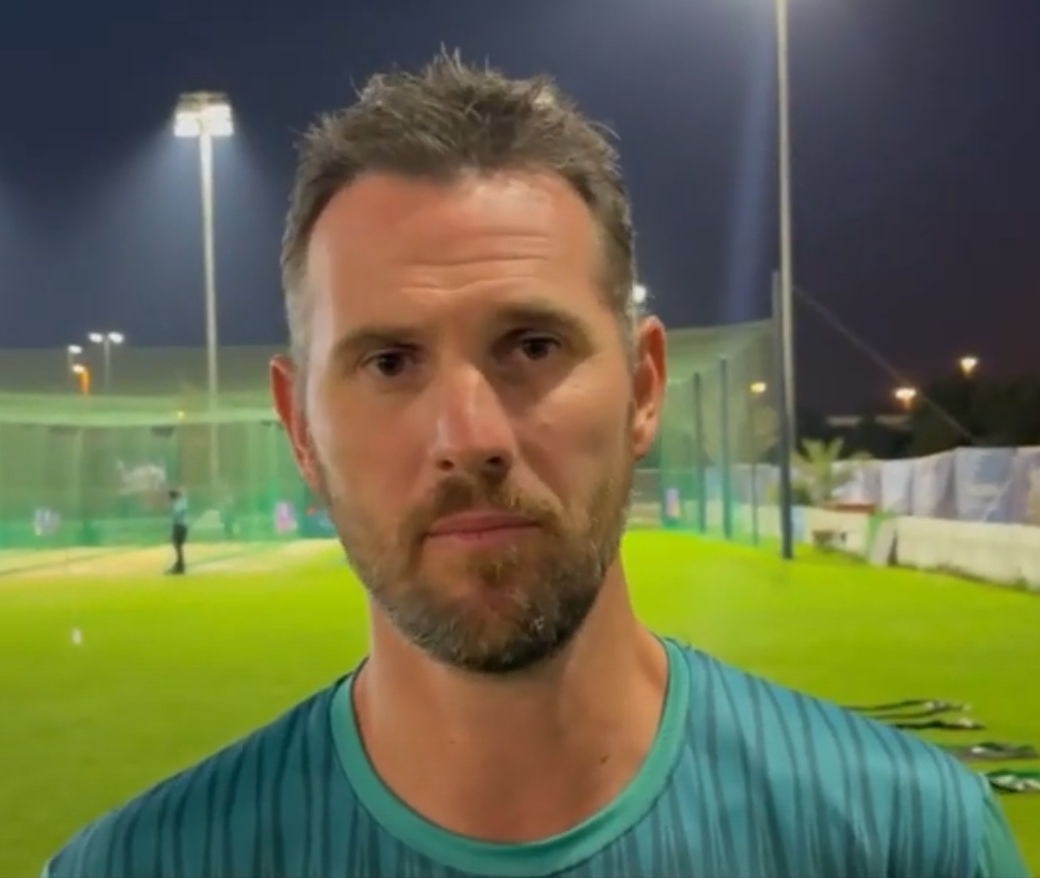
Tait as bowling consultant of the Afghanistan cricket team in 2021

In August 2021 Tait was appointed as a bowling consultant to the Afghanistan national cricket team. At the end of the same year he resigned from the post and in February 2022 was appointed as the bowling coach of the Pakistan national cricket team for 12 months. He wa then appointed as a bowling coach of Bangladesh national cricket team. In October 2026, he was re-appointed as the bowling coach of Pakistan.

== Playing style ==
Tait's delivery action was a sling style reminiscent of former Australian fast bowler Jeff Thomson's action. Dubbed "The Wild Thing", during his career Tait was considered one of the fastest bowlers in the world, regularly bowling at speeds up to 155 km/h. During a Twenty20 international match in February 2010 Tait bowled a ball measured at 160.7 km/h, the fastest ball ever recorded in Australia. Tait has often been described as "erratic" and is capable of bowling many extras, although his unpredictability can be a positive factor in dismissing batsmen. Tait has also been criticised as being "expensive."

After a Twenty20 match against New Zealand on 11 December 2007, in which Tait troubled the batsmen and took 2/22, New Zealand captain Daniel Vettori and coach John Bracewell publicly raised doubts over the legality of Tait's bowling action. Tait labelled the comments as a "disgrace" and added that he would be willing to undergo tests to prove his action was legal.

== Career best performances ==
	Bowling			
	Score	Fixture	Venue	Season
Test	3/97	Australia v England	Trent Bridge, Nottingham	2005
ODI	4/39	Australia v South Africa	Beausejour Stadium, Gros Islet, Saint Lucia	2006/07
T20I	3/13	Australia v Pakistan	MCG, Melbourne	2009/10
FC	7/29	South Australia v Queensland	Gabba, Brisbane	2007/08
LA	8/43	South Australia v Tasmania	Adelaide Oval, Adelaide	2003/04
T20	5/32	South Australia v Royal Challengers Bangalore	M. Chinnaswamy Stadium, Bangalore	2011/12

== Personal life ==
In August 2013, Tait became engaged to Indian model and entrepreneur Mashoom Singha. They were married in June 2014 in Mumbai. In March 2017, Tait announced that he had become an overseas citizen of India.

== Awards ==
- Bradman Young Cricketer of the Year: 2004
- Lord Hampden Trophy: 2007
- ICC Emerging Player of the Year: 2007
- Australian Cricketers' Association All-star Ford Ranger Cup team: 2007–08

Preceded by Ian Bell	Emerging Player of the Year; 2007	Succeeded by Ajantha Mendis
