= Graham Manou =

Australian cricketer

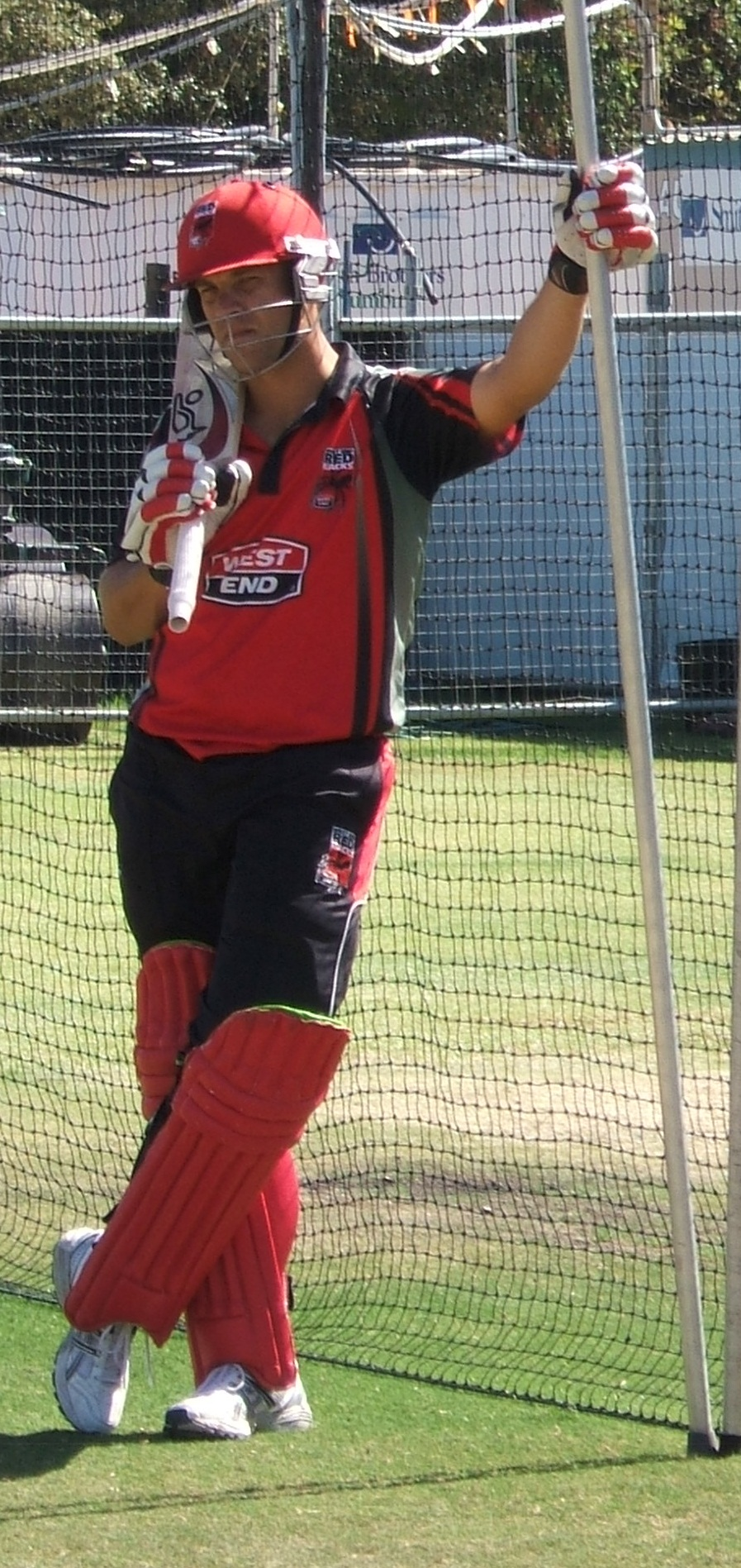
- Manou in a practice session

Personal information
- Full name: Graham Allan Manou
- Born: 23 April 1979 (age 47); Modbury, South Australia, Australia
- Nickname: Choc
- Batting: Right-handed
- Role: Wicket-keeper

International information
- National side: Australia (2009)
- Only Test (cap 411): 30 July 2009 v England
- ODI debut (cap 180): 31 October 2009 v India
- Last ODI: 8 November 2009 v India

Domestic team information
- Years: Team
- 1999/00–2010/11: South Australia
- 2011/12: Melbourne Renegades

Career statistics
Competition	Test	ODI	FC	LA
Matches	1	4	103	118
Runs scored	21	7	4,003	1,613
Batting average	21.00	7.00	25.49	21.79
100s/50s	0/0	0/0	6/20	0/4
Top score	13*	7	190	63
Catches/stumpings	3/0	5/0	328/21	152/16
- Source: CricketArchive, 20 April 2014

Graham Allan Manou (born 23 April 1979) is a former Australian cricketer who played for South Australia and the Melbourne Renegades in Australian domestic cricket, as well as one Test match and several One Day Internationals for the Australian national cricket team. He is a wicket-keeper and aggressive right-handed batsman who has taken more dismissals than any other South Australian player in One Day domestic cricket. Manou announced his retirement from First Class cricket in March 2011. In May 2022, he was appointed as the general manager of cricket performance of the Victoria cricket team. For this, he left Cricket Australia (CA).

== Junior career ==
Manou was a successful junior cricketer, who won the Player of the Tournament award when captaining South Australia at the 1997–98 national under-19 carnival.

== Domestic career ==
He made his first-class debut on 22 March 1999 playing for the Australian Cricket Academy against a Matabeleland Invitational XI at Queens Sports Club in Bulawayo. In the 1999–2000 Australian domestic season, Manou replaced the retired Tim Nielsen in the South Australian side as wicket-keeper for the Pura Cup and Mercantile Mutual competitions. Although he impressed with the gloves he struggled with the bat as he scored ducks in four of his first five innings, including a pair against the touring Pakistanis. His batting has improved since then and in 2003–04, when given an opportunity to open the batting, Manou posted a score of 130. He later bettered this in 2007–08 when he scored 190 against Tasmania in a Pura Cup game at the Bellerive Oval.

In 2004–05, Manou was appointed vice-captain of the Redbacks and when Darren Lehmann was either on national duty or injured he would be the stand in captain. He led from the front with 433 runs and 36 dismissals. In 2005–06 he took a personal best of 42 Pura Cup dismissals along with 21 in the ING Cup. With the bat he has twice collected $50,000 for his team by hitting the ING sign on the fence (on the full).

In season 2008–09, Manou scored 647 runs at an average of 46.21 with a highest score of 124 in Sheffield Shield competition leaving him on the verge of Ashes squad selection. His fine season was capped off with the honour of being selected as the vice captain for the Domestic Sheffield Shield, One Day and Twenty-20 teams of the year.

== International career ==
He was named in the 2009 Ashes squad, and subsequently made his Test debut in the 3rd Test at Edgbaston, after Brad Haddin broke his finger during the warm-up, making Haddin the first Australian wicketkeeper to miss a test since Ian Healy broke his thumb in 1994. He claimed his first dismissal when he caught Alastair Cook off the bowling of Peter Siddle. During his first innings in the same match he was bowled by James Anderson for just 8 runs. On 31 October 2009, Manou made his one day international debut against India when he was called upon to replace Tim Paine, who had himself been called up as a replacement, after Paine broke a finger.

== Personal life ==
Manou's wife is Australian Olympic runner Tamsyn Manou, formerly Tamsyn Lewis.
