= List of Tasmanian representative cricketers =

This is a list of cricket players who have played representative cricket for Tasmania in Australia.

It includes players that have played at least one match, in senior first-class, List A cricket, or Twenty20 matches. Practice matches are not included, unless they have officially been classified as first-class, List A or T20 games. The list is in chronological order of the players' first appearances for the Tasmania first team in any form of cricket; where two or more players debuted in the same match, they are ordered by their surnames. The list is complete to the end of the 2010/11 season.

== Tasmania in senior cricket ==
Though Tasmania took part in the first recognised first-class cricket match in Australia in 1850/51, it remained on the peripheries of Australian cricket for more than a century, confined to "friendly" first-class matches against other Australian states, primarily Victoria, and touring teams from the other Test-playing nations. After World War II, even the friendly matches against other Australian states became less frequent. To supplement the limited local schedule, matches were arranged in several seasons for a "Tasmania Combined XI", with the side consisting of some Tasmanian cricketers and others imported, usually from mainland Australia; matches played by this team do not count as first-class games for the Tasmania cricket team, and are therefore not included in this table.

From the late 1960s, with the import of foreign players, such as the English cricketers John Hampshire, Jack Simmons and Alan Knott, Tasmania was admitted first into the List A competitions and then into first-class competition.

The Sheffield Shield is the premier domestic cricket competition in Australia. It was founded in 1892, but a Tasmanian representative side was not permitted to enter the competition by the Australian Cricket Board (now Cricket Australia) until the 1977/78 season. Even then the first two seasons were on a trial basis only.

Whilst they initially struggled to prove competitive at first-class level, the Tasmanian Tigers won their first domestic trophy in 1978/79, capturing the domestic List A cricket Gillette Cup. This was a success repeated when they won the Ford Ranger Cup in 2004/05, and again in 2007/08. The Tigers also won their first First class cricket title in 2006/07, winning the Sheffield Shield, then known as the Pura Cup, in that year. A second success followed in 2010/11. Tasmania has also been twice runners-up in the domestic Twenty20 competition.

== Cricketers ==
=== Key ===
- First – Year of debut
- Last – Year of latest game
- Apps – Number of matches played
- – Player has represented Australia in a Test match, Limited Overs International or Twenty20 International match.
- – Player has represented a nation other than Australia in a Test match, Limited Overs International or Twenty20 International.

=== Players whose debut was between 1851 and 1900 ===
No	Name	First	Last	Apps	First	Last	Apps	First	Last	Apps	Notes
No	Name	First-class			List A			Twenty20			Notes
1.	Charles Arthur	1850/51	1850/51	1	–	–	–	–	–	–	
2.	Gervase Du Croz	1850/51	1850/51	1	–	–	–	–	–	–	Played for Victoria against Tasmania in 1853/54
3.	William Field	1850/51	1850/51	1	–	–	–	–	–	–	
4.	Vincent Giblin	1850/51	1850/51	1	–	–	–	–	–	–	
5.	George Gibson	1850/51	1857/58	3	–	–	–	–	–	–	
6.	William Henty	1850/51	1851/52	2	–	–	–	–	–	–	
7.	George Maddox	1850/51	1857/58	4	–	–	–	–	–	–	
8.	John Marshall	1850/51	1853/54	3	–	–	–	–	–	–	He captained the team in the first first-class match
9.	Robert McDowall	1850/51	1853/54	2	–	–	–	–	–	–	
10.	John Tabart	1850/51	1857/58	5	–	–	–	–	–	–	
11.	Walter Westbrook	1850/51	1853/54	2	–	–	–	–	–	–	
12.	Henry Allison	1851/52	1857/58	2	–	–	–	–	–	–	
13.	John Cox	1851/52	1857/58	2	–	–	–	–	–	–	Played for Victoria against Tasmania in 1853/54
14.	Adye Douglas	1851/52	1851/52	1	–	–	–	–	–	–	
15.	Henry Lette	1851/52	1851/52	1	–	–	–	–	–	–	
16.	Arthur Marriott	1851/52	1851/52	1	–	–	–	–	–	–	
17.	Wilson McEwan	1851/52	1851/52	1	–	–	–	–	–	–	
18.	John Watson	1851/52	1851/52	1	–	–	–	–	–	–	
19.	Richard Cox	1853/54	1853/54	1	–	–	–	–	–	–	
20.	Augustus Lochner	1853/54	1853/54	1	–	–	–	–	–	–	
21.	George Matson	1853/54	1857/58	2	–	–	–	–	–	–	
22.	Robert Still	1853/54	1857/58	2	–	–	–	–	–	–	
23.	Joseph Ware	1853/54	1853/54	1	–	–	–	–	–	–	
24.	Nicholas Clayton	1857/58	1857/58	1	–	–	–	–	–	–	
25.	Joseph Dixon	1857/58	1857/58	2	–	–	–	–	–	–	
26.	Charles Evans	1857/58	1857/58	1	–	–	–	–	–	–	
27.	Walter Jamieson	1857/58	1857/58	2	–	–	–	–	–	–	
28.	Thomas Westbrook	1857/58	1857/58	2	–	–	–	–	–	–	
29.	George Briant	1857/58	1857/58	1	–	–	–	–	–	–	
30.	William Brown	1857/58	1857/58	1	–	–	–	–	–	–	
31.	John Mace	1857/58	1857/58	1	–	–	–	–	–	–	
32.	George Marshall	1857/58	1857/58	1	–	–	–	–	–	–	
33.	Thomas Patterson	1857/58	1857/58	1	–	–	–	–	–	–	
34.	Thomas Whitesides	1857/58	1868/69	2	–	–	–	–	–	–	
35.	George Arthur	1868/69	1877/78	2	–	–	–	–	–	–	
36.	John Arthur	1868/69	1872/73	3	–	–	–	–	–	–	He also played for Rest of Australia in 1872/73
37.	William Birch	1868/69	1877/78	2	–	–	–	–	–	–	
38.	James Burn	1868/69	1868/69	1	–	–	–	–	–	–	
39.	Daniel Cuthbert	1868/69	1877/78	2	–	–	–	–	–	–	
40.	Thomas Daly	1868/69	1868/69	1	–	–	–	–	–	–	
41.	Henry Dumaresq	1868/69	1868/69	1	–	–	–	–	–	–	
42.	Henry Evans	1868/69	1868/69	1	–	–	–	–	–	–	He later played for Wellington
43.	James Hamilton	1868/69	1868/69	1	–	–	–	–	–	–	
44.	Cecil Perry	1868/69	1868/69	1	–	–	–	–	–	–	He later played for Canterbury
45.	Richard Barnes	1870/71	1870/71	1	–	–	–	–	–	–	He also played for Rest of Australia in 1872/73
46.	Henry Barrett	1870/71	1870/71	1	–	–	–	–	–	–	
47.	Henry Bayly	1870/71	1877/78	2	–	–	–	–	–	–	
48.	Edward Butler	1870/71	1883/84	5	–	–	–	–	–	–	He played for Victoria against Tasmania in 1872/73 and in four matches in England in 1877
49.	Miles Coverdale	1870/71	1870/71	1	–	–	–	–	–	–	
50.	George Davies	1870/71	1883/84	7	–	–	–	–	–	–	Later Speaker of House of Assembly in Tasmanian parliament and knighted
51.	James Ferguson	1870/71	1877/78	2	–	–	–	–	–	–	
52.	William Glynn	1870/71	1870/71	1	–	–	–	–	–	–	
53.	Frederick Haymes	1870/71	1872/73	2	–	–	–	–	–	–	
54.	John Thomas	1870/71	1870/71	1	–	–	–	–	–	–	
55.	George Herbert Bailey	1872/73	1892/93	2	–	–	–	–	–	–	13 of his 15 first-class matches were for the 1878 Australians in England. Father of Keith Bailey.
56.	Charles Butler	1872/73	1898/99	6	–	–	–	–	–	–	
57.	William Collins	1872/73	1872/73	1	–	–	–	–	–	–	
58.	Edward Freeman	1872/73	1872/73	1	–	–	–	–	–	–	
59.	John Lord	1872/73	1872/73	1	–	–	–	–	–	–	He played for Hampshire in 1864
60.	James Martin	1872/73	1872/73	1	–	–	–	–	–	–	
61.	William Walker	1872/73	1877/78	2	–	–	–	–	–	–	
62.	John Walshe	1872/73	1872/73	1	–	–	–	–	–	–	
63.	James Bennison	1877/78	1877/78	1	–	–	–	–	–	–	
64.	Henry Lovett	1877/78	1877/78	1	–	–	–	–	–	–	
65.	Edward Lucas	1877/78	1877/78	1	–	–	–	–	–	–	
66.	William Martin	1877/78	1877/78	1	–	–	–	–	–	–	
67.	Kenneth Burn	1883/84	1909/10	25	–	–	–	–	–	–	He toured England in 1890 and played two Tests there
68.	George Gatehouse	1883/84	1899/1900	14	–	–	–	–	–	–	
69.	Harold Hale	1883/84	1910/11	13	–	–	–	–	–	–	He played in England between 1886 and 1890 for Gloucestershire and Cambridge University
70.	Vere Harris	1883/84	1883/84	4	–	–	–	–	–	–	He played once for Western Australia in 1898/99
71.	Thomas Kendall	1883/84	1888/89	5	–	–	–	–	–	–	He played in the first-ever Tests in 1876/77 and once for Victoria in 1879/80
72.	Richard Kirby	1883/84	1883/84	4	–	–	–	–	–	–	
73.	James Mansfield	1883/84	1883/84	4	–	–	–	–	–	–	
74.	Louis Sams	1883/84	1883/84	4	–	–	–	–	–	–	Brother of Richard Sams
75.	William Sidebottom	1883/84	1894/95	8	–	–	–	–	–	–	
76.	Eustace Maxwell	1888/89	1897/98	5	–	–	–	–	–	–	
77.	Claude Rock	1888/89	1892/93	3	–	–	–	–	–	–	He played for Cambridge University from 1884 to 1886. Brother of Norman Rock.
78.	Thomas Ryan	1888/89	1889/90	2	–	–	–	–	–	–	
79.	John Savigny	1888/89	1910/11	13	–	–	–	–	–	–	Brother of William Savigny
80.	William Savigny	1888/89	1895/96	4	–	–	–	–	–	–	Brother of John Savigny
81.	Charles Vautin	1888/89	1895/96	2	–	–	–	–	–	–	
82.	Charles Eady	1889/90	1907/08	20	–	–	–	–	–	–	He toured England in 1896 playing one Test and appeared in a single Test in Australia in 1901/02
83.	Charles McAllen	1889/90	1900/01	10	–	–	–	–	–	–	
84.	George Pennefather	1889/90	1896/97	2	–	–	–	–	–	–	
85.	George Vautin	1889/90	1889/90	1	–	–	–	–	–	–	He played once for Victoria in 1894/95
86.	Henry Wilson	1889/90	1900/01	6	–	–	–	–	–	–	Brother of John Wilson
87.	John Wilson	1889/90	1889/90	1	–	–	–	–	–	–	Brother of Henry Wilson
88.	Norman Rock	1890/91	1893/94	2	–	–	–	–	–	–	Brother of Claude Rock
89.	Edward Windsor	1890/91	1911/12	24	–	–	–	–	–	–	He also played twice in Australian XI v The Rest matches, once on each side
90.	John Bingham	1892/93	1900/01	6	–	–	–	–	–	–	
91.	Alfred Douglas	1893/94	1895/96	3	–	–	–	–	–	–	
92.	Richard Sams	1893/94	1904/05	2	–	–	–	–	–	–	Brother of Louis Sams
93.	John Watt	1893/94	1895/96	3	–	–	–	–	–	–	Father of John Charles Watt
94.	Norman Westbrook	1893/94	1908/09	6	–	–	–	–	–	–	
95.	Francis Campbell	1894/95	1894/95	1	–	–	–	–	–	–	
96.	John Howe	1894/95	1894/95	1	–	–	–	–	–	–	
97.	Colin Campbell	1896/97	1896/97	1	–	–	–	–	–	–	
98.	George Palmer	1896/97	1896/97	1	–	–	–	–	–	–	He had played in 17 Test matches between 1880 and 1886 and for Victoria between 1878/79 and 1894/95
99.	Tom Tabart	1896/97	1908/09	10	–	–	–	–	–	–	
100.	Francis Pictet	1897/98	1897/98	1	–	–	–	–	–	–	
101.	John Ramsay	1897/98	1897/98	1	–	–	–	–	–	–	Later knighted for career as a surgeon
102.	William Ward	1897/98	1906/07	4	–	–	–	–	–	–	
103.	Osborne Douglas	1898/99	1904/05	7	–	–	–	–	–	–	
104.	Charles Hammond	1898/99	1899/1900	2	–	–	–	–	–	–	
105.	Walter Richardson	1898/99	1911/12	4	–	–	–	–	–	–	Brother of Leslie Richardson
106.	Norman Dodds	1898/99	1907/08	12	–	–	–	–	–	–	He also played for Australia on a non-Test tour of New Zealand in 1909–10.
107.	Reginald Hawson	1898/99	1913/14	27	–	–	–	–	–	–	Brother of Stan Hawson
108.	George Paton	1898/99	1913/14	21	–	–	–	–	–	–	
109.	Alfred Pickett	1899/1900	1899/1900	2	–	–	–	–	–	–	
110.	Edgar Hawson	1899/1900	1904/05	5	–	–	–	–	–	–	Brother of Reginald Hawson

=== Players whose debut was between 1900 and 1940 ===
No	Name	First	Last	Apps	First	Last	Apps	First	Last	Apps	Notes
No	Name	First-class			List A			Twenty20			Notes
111.	Arthur Betts	1902/03	1902/03	1	–	–	–	–	–	–	
112.	Frederick Chancellor	1902/03	1911/12	11	–	–	–	–	–	–	
113.	Ernest Harrison	1902/03	1910/11	10	–	–	–	–	–	–	
114.	Frederick Richardson	1902/03	1902/03	1	–	–	–	–	–	–	
115.	Keith Bailey	1903/04	1903/04	2	–	–	–	–	–	–	Son of George Herbert Bailey
116.	Leonard Cuff	1903/04	1904/05	3	–	–	–	–	–	–	He had played for Canterbury, Auckland and New Zealand sides since 1886/87.
117.	Douglas Smith	1903/04	1904/05	3	–	–	–	–	–	–	
118.	Alexander Addison	1903/04	1903/04	1	–	–	–	–	–	–	
119.	Eric James	1903/04	1903/04	1	–	–	–	–	–	–	
120.	Albert Frost	1904/05	1907/08	3	–	–	–	–	–	–	
121.	John Charles Watt	1904/05	1904/05	1	–	–	–	–	–	–	Son of John Watt
122.	Frederick Hanson	1906/07	1907/08	2	–	–	–	–	–	–	
123.	John Hudson	1906/07	1911/12	6	–	–	–	–	–	–	
124.	James Meech	1906/07	1909/10	2	–	–	–	–	–	–	
125.	Harry Henri	1907/08	1907/08	1	–	–	–	–	–	–	
126.	Charles Martin	1907/08	1928/29	21	–	–	–	–	–	–	
127.	Harry Smith	1907/08	1914/15	4	–	–	–	–	–	–	He played a single match for Victoria in 1912/13
128.	Leonard Ward	1907/08	1907/08	1	–	–	–	–	–	–	
129.	William Forster	1907/08	1907/08	1	–	–	–	–	–	–	
130.	Thomas Carroll	1907/08	1921/22	11	–	–	–	–	–	–	
131.	Charles Payne	1907/08	1912/13	4	–	–	–	–	–	–	
132.	Arthur Braithwaite	1908/09	1908/09	2	–	–	–	–	–	–	
133.	Ashley Facy	1908/09	1922/23	4	–	–	–	–	–	–	He also played for Australia on a non-Test tour of New Zealand and for Victoria.
134.	Harry Parkinson	1908/09	1913/14	6	–	–	–	–	–	–	
135.	Thomas Elliott	1908/09	1913/14	3	–	–	–	–	–	–	
136.	William Reid	1908/09	1908/09	1	–	–	–	–	–	–	
137.	Hastings Woolley	1908/09	1908/09	1	–	–	–	–	–	–	
138.	William Eltham	1909/10	1913/14	11	–	–	–	–	–	–	
139.	Ted McDonald	1909/10	1910/11	2	–	–	–	–	–	–	He played 11 Test matches between 1920/21 and 1921/22. From 1911/12 to 1921/22 he played for Victoria; from 1924 to 1931 he played for Lancashire.
140.	Stanley McKenzie	1909/10	1912/13	5	–	–	–	–	–	–	
141.	Keith Westbrook	1909/10	1909/10	1	–	–	–	–	–	–	Nephew of Russell Westbrook; brother of Roy Westbrook
142.	Ernest Free	1909/10	1909/10	1	–	–	–	–	–	–	
143.	Thornton Rockliffe	1909/10	1909/10	1	–	–	–	–	–	–	
144.	Sydney Frost	1910/11	1910/11	2	–	–	–	–	–	–	
145.	Charles Russen	1910/11	1910/11	1	–	–	–	–	–	–	He played as a full substitute for John Savigny, who failed to appear for the match
146.	Llewellyn Thomas	1910/11	1921/22	7	–	–	–	–	–	–	
147.	Roy Westbrook	1910/11	1913/14	3	–	–	–	–	–	–	Nephew of Russell Westbrook; brother of Keith Westbrook. He played 11 matches for Otago from 1914/15 to 1921/22.
148.	Edmond Boddam	1910/11	1913/14	5	–	–	–	–	–	–	
149.	Lynwood Gill	1911/12	1912/13	3	–	–	–	–	–	–	Played for Queensland in 1926/27 and 1927/28.
150.	Leonard Tumilty	1911/12	1911/12	2	–	–	–	–	–	–	
151.	Norman Vincent	1911/12	1911/12	2	–	–	–	–	–	–	
152.	Alan Newton	1911/12	1933/34	27	–	–	–	–	–	–	
153.	Arthur Thomlinson	1911/12	1911/12	1	–	–	–	–	–	–	
154.	Arthur Crowder	1911/12	1911/12	1	–	–	–	–	–	–	
155.	Eustace Headlam	1911/12	1911/12	1	–	–	–	–	–	–	Brother of Felix Headlam
156.	Rupert Pennycuick	1911/12	1912/13	3	–	–	–	–	–	–	
157.	Arthur Watt	1911/12	1925/26	7	–	–	–	–	–	–	Son of John Watt, brother of John Charles Watt
158.	Reginald Davis	1912/13	1914/15	4	–	–	–	–	–	–	
159.	Charles Robinson	1912/13	1913/14	4	–	–	–	–	–	–	He played one match for Western Australia in 1920/21.
160.	Harold Allen	1912/13	1913/14	2	–	–	–	–	–	–	
161.	George Linney	1912/13	1912/13	1	–	–	–	–	–	–	His son Keith played for Somerset in the 1930s.
162.	Edward Butler	1913/14	1914/15	2	–	–	–	–	–	–	
163.	Thomas Freeman	1913/14	1913/14	1	–	–	–	–	–	–	
164.	Hubert Myers	1913/14	1924/25	4	–	–	–	–	–	–	He played for Yorkshire from 1901 to 1910.
165.	Horace Smith	1913/14	1927/28	6	–	–	–	–	–	–	
166.	Julian Woods	1913/14	1913/14	1	–	–	–	–	–	–	
167.	Laurence Gatenby	1913/14	1913/14	2	–	–	–	–	–	–	
168.	Robert Bayles	1913/14	1913/14	1	–	–	–	–	–	–	Brother of William Bayles
169.	William Bayles	1913/14	1913/14	1	–	–	–	–	–	–	Brother of Vivian Bayles
170.	Algernon Findlay	1913/14	1930/31	7	–	–	–	–	–	–	
171.	Felix Headlam	1913/14	1914/15	2	–	–	–	–	–	–	Brother of Eustace Headlam
172.	James Jakins	1913/14	1913/14	1	–	–	–	–	–	–	
173.	Phillip Shawe	1913/14	1914/15	2	–	–	–	–	–	–	
174.	Weller Arnold	1914/15	1914/15	1	–	–	–	–	–	–	
175.	Sidney Lord	1914/15	1914/15	1	–	–	–	–	–	–	
176.	Ronald Powell	1914/15	1914/15	1	–	–	–	–	–	–	
177.	Frank Butler	1921/22	1923/24	3	–	–	–	–	–	–	He played for Canterbury in 1914/15.
178.	Bert Davie	1921/22	1922/23	2	–	–	–	–	–	–	He played for Victoria in 1926/27.
179.	Geoffrey Martin	1921/22	1932/33	23	–	–	–	–	–	–	
180.	Les Richardson	1921/22	1921/22	1	–	–	–	–	–	–	Brother of Walter Richardson.
181.	Frederick Toby	1921/22	1921/22	1	–	–	–	–	–	–	
182.	George Allan	1922/23	1927/28	7	–	–	–	–	–	–	
183.	Garnet Goodrick	1922/23	1922/23	1	–	–	–	–	–	–	
184.	Philip Henty	1922/23	1928/29	7	–	–	–	–	–	–	
185.	Geoffrey Loney	1922/23	1922/23	1	–	–	–	–	–	–	
186.	Alfred Rushforth	1922/23	1936/37	24	–	–	–	–	–	–	
187.	Owen Burrows	1923/24	1936/37	32	–	–	–	–	–	–	
188.	Neil Davis	1923/24	1935/36	11	–	–	–	–	–	–	Brother of Arthur Davis.
189.	Allen Limb	1923/24	1928/29	3	–	–	–	–	–	–	
190.	Clyde Lucas	1923/24	1923/24	1	–	–	–	–	–	–	
191.	Rex Bennett	1924/25	1925/26	3	–	–	–	–	–	–	He played five matches for South Australia in 1922/23.
192.	Arthur Davis	1924/25	1925/26	2	–	–	–	–	–	–	Brother of Neil Davis.
193.	Douglas Green	1924/25	1936/37	25	–	–	–	–	–	–	
194.	Albert Shugg	1924/25	1924/25	2	–	–	–	–	–	–	
195.	Syd James	1924/25	1924/25	1	–	–	–	–	–	–	
196.	Clarence Lee	1925/26	1925/26	1	–	–	–	–	–	–	
197.	Douglas Wardlaw	1925/26	1928/29	7	–	–	–	–	–	–	Brother of Robert Wardlaw.
198.	Roy Wilkins	1925/26	1925/26	2	–	–	–	–	–	–	
199.	Alfred Watson	1925/26	1927/28	4	–	–	–	–	–	–	
200.	Jim Atkinson	1926/27	1933/34	22	–	–	–	–	–	–	He played four times for Victoria between 1921/22 and 1925/26.
201.	Rex Townley	1926/27	1935/36	16	–	–	–	–	–	–	
202.	Raymond Friend	1927/28	1928/29	2	–	–	–	–	–	–	
203.	Clarence Driscoll	1927/28	1927/28	1	–	–	–	–	–	–	Brother of Vernon Driscoll.
204.	Vernon Driscoll	1927/28	1931/32	4	–	–	–	–	–	–	Brother of Clarence Driscoll.
205.	Austin Punch	1927/28	1927/28	1	–	–	–	–	–	–	He played for New South Wales between 1919/20 and 1928/29.
206.	Arnell Horton	1928/29	1928/29	1	–	–	–	–	–	–	
207.	Stephen Wellington	1928/29	1928/29	1	–	–	–	–	–	–	
208.	Victor Hooper	1928/29	1932/33	14	–	–	–	–	–	–	
209.	Gerald James	1928/29	1945/46	35	–	–	–	–	–	–	
210.	Leslie Richardson	1928/29	1931/32	9	–	–	–	–	–	–	
211.	Gordon Gibson	1928/29	1932/33	6	–	–	–	–	–	–	
212.	Leslie Phelps	1928/29	1928/29	1	–	–	–	–	–	–	
213.	Cecil Wood	1928/29	1929/30	5	–	–	–	–	–	–	
214.	Walter McDonald	1928/29	1928/29	1	–	–	–	–	–	–	He had played for Victoria in 1921/22 and Queensland in 1924/25.
215.	Edward Pickett	1928/29	1935/36	11	–	–	–	–	–	–	He was Australian national snooker champion in 1955.
216.	Laurie Nash	1929/30	1931/32	17	–	–	–	–	–	–	He played Test cricket in 1931/32 and 1936/37 and for Victoria in 1936/37.
217.	Gordon Lethborg	1929/30	1932/33	4	–	–	–	–	–	–	
218.	Jack Badcock	1929/30	1933/34	19	–	–	–	–	–	–	He played seven Tests from 1936/37 to 1938 and for South Australia from 1934/35 to 1940/41.
219.	Alan Cuff	1929/30	1929/30	1	–	–	–	–	–	–	Son of Leonard Cuff.
220.	Douglas Vautin	1929/30	1929/30	1	–	–	–	–	–	–	Son of Charles Vautin.
221.	Desmond Brain	1930/31	1930/31	3	–	–	–	–	–	–	
222.	John Brain	1930/31	1930/31	2	–	–	–	–	–	–	
223.	Stuart Taylor	1930/31	1930/31	2	–	–	–	–	–	–	
224.	Norman Murray	1930/31	1930/31	2	–	–	–	–	–	–	
225.	Sydney Putman	1930/31	1938/39	20	–	–	–	–	–	–	
226.	Edward Smith	1930/31	1938/39	12	–	–	–	–	–	–	
227.	Thomas Matthews	1930/31	1930/31	3	–	–	–	–	–	–	
228.	Ron Ward	1930/31	1935/36	5	–	–	–	–	–	–	
229.	Bill Cahill	1931/32	1931/32	4	–	–	–	–	–	–	
230.	Ron Morrisby	1931/32	1951/52	33	–	–	–	–	–	–	He toured India with the Australians in 1935/36 but no Tests were played on the tour.
231.	Cyril Parry	1931/32	1933/34	15	–	–	–	–	–	–	He played for South Australia from 1925/26 to 1930/31.
232.	Ken Gourlay	1932/33	1936/37	3	–	–	–	–	–	–	
233.	James Walsh	1932/33	1936/37	15	–	–	–	–	–	–	
234.	Reginald Broomby	1932/33	1932/33	2	–	–	–	–	–	–	
235.	James Tringrove	1932/33	1938/39	3	–	–	–	–	–	–	
236.	Clifton Jeffery	1932/33	1946/47	15	–	–	–	–	–	–	
237.	Arthur Trebilcock	1932/33	1932/33	1	–	–	–	–	–	–	
238.	Artie Combes	1932/33	1946/47	8	–	–	–	–	–	–	Brother of Maxwell Combes
239.	Max Combes	1932/33	1938/39	10	–	–	–	–	–	–	Brother of Artie Combes
240.	Frank Davis	1933/34	1933/34	2	–	–	–	–	–	–	
241.	Raymond Ferrall	1933/34	1934/35	5	–	–	–	–	–	–	
242.	John Rothwell	1933/34	1933/34	4	–	–	–	–	–	–	
243.	Ron Thomas	1933/34	1950/51	24	–	–	–	–	–	–	
244.	Alan Pearsall	1933/34	1938/39	7	–	–	–	–	–	–	
245.	Philip Dulling	1934/35	1934/35	1	–	–	–	–	–	–	
246.	Joe Sankey	1934/35	1947/48	7	–	–	–	–	–	–	
247.	Jack Gardiner	1935/36	1948/49	13	–	–	–	–	–	–	
248.	John Nicolson	1936/37	1938/39	4	–	–	–	–	–	–	
249.	Douglas Thollar	1936/37	1938/39	3	–	–	–	–	–	–	
250.	Bruce Wardlaw	1936/37	1936/37	1	–	–	–	–	–	–	Brother of Douglas Wardlaw.
251.	Eric Dwyer	1937/38	1937/38	1	–	–	–	–	–	–	
252.	Julian Murfett	1937/38	1947/48	11	–	–	–	–	–	–	
253.	Cecil Oakes	1937/38	1938/39	2	–	–	–	–	–	–	

=== Players whose debut was between 1940 and 1969 ===
No	Name	First	Last	Apps	First	Last	Apps	First	Last	Apps	Notes
No	Name	First-class			List A			Twenty20			Notes
254.	Ray Elliott	1945/46	1945/46	1	–	–	–	–	–	–	
255.	Donald Ellis	1945/46	1945/46	1	–	–	–	–	–	–	
256.	Arthur Lovett	1945/46	1945/46	1	–	–	–	–	–	–	He played once for Western Australia in 1950/51.
257.	Eric Morse	1945/46	1946/47	3	–	–	–	–	–	–	
258.	Max Thomas	1945/46	1956/57	17	–	–	–	–	–	–	
259.	Alfred Wilkes	1945/46	1948/49	8	–	–	–	–	–	–	
260.	Brian Booth	1946/47	1959/60	8	–	–	–	–	–	–	
261.	Donald Clark	1946/47	1946/47	3	–	–	–	–	–	–	
262.	Leonard Alexander	1946/47	1951/52	9	–	–	–	–	–	–	
263.	Jack Laver	1946/47	1951/52	11	–	–	–	–	–	–	
264.	Colin Richardson	1946/47	1950/51	8	–	–	–	–	–	–	
265.	Derreck Calvert	1946/47	1952/53	3	–	–	–	–	–	–	
266.	Keith Kildey	1946/47	1946/47	1	–	–	–	–	–	–	
267.	Noel Diprose	1947/48	1956/57	15	–	–	–	–	–	–	
268.	Darrell Jackman	1947/48	1950/51	5	–	–	–	–	–	–	
269.	Wal Walmsley	1947/48	1947/48	3	–	–	–	–	–	–	He played for New South Wales in 1945/46 and later played for Queensland and Northern Districts.
270.	Emerson Rodwell	1947/48	1955/56	15	–	–	–	–	–	–	
271.	Trevor Gordon	1948/49	1948/49	2	–	–	–	–	–	–	
272.	Reg Richardson	1948/49	1951/52	4	–	–	–	–	–	–	
273.	Athol Shephard	1948/49	1959/60	7	–	–	–	–	–	–	
274.	Harry Ward	1948/49	1948/49	1	–	–	–	–	–	–	
275.	Terence Cowley	1948/49	1961/62	24	–	–	–	–	–	–	
276.	Ivor Clay	1949/50	1950/51	3	–	–	–	–	–	–	
277.	Rex Davidson	1949/50	1955/56	11	–	–	–	–	–	–	
278.	Basil Reid	1949/50	1952/53	5	–	–	–	–	–	–	
279.	Keith Schmidt	1949/50	1960/61	15	–	–	–	–	–	–	
280.	Lloyd Smith	1950/51	1958/59	7	–	–	–	–	–	–	
281.	Arthur Triffitt	1950/51	1950/51	1	–	–	–	–	–	–	
282.	Doug Walton	1950/51	1960/61	7	–	–	–	–	–	–	
283.	Keith Dollery	1950/51	1950/51	2	–	–	–	–	–	–	He played for Queensland in 1947/48, Auckland in 1949/50 and Warwickshire from 1951 to 1956.
284.	Geoffrey Martin	1950/51	1950/51	1	–	–	–	–	–	–	Son of Geoff Martin.
285.	Jack Shelton	1950/51	1956/57	2	–	–	–	–	–	–	
286.	Geoffrey Goodwin	1951/52	1951/52	2	–	–	–	–	–	–	
287.	John Maddox	1951/52	1956/57	8	–	–	–	–	–	–	
288.	Richard Newman	1951/52	1952/53	4	–	–	–	–	–	–	
289.	Clifton Hurburgh	1951/52	1951/52	1	–	–	–	–	–	–	
290.	Dale Anderson	1952/53	1963/64	6	–	–	–	–	–	–	
291.	Rex Garwood	1952/53	1955/56	5	–	–	–	–	–	–	
292.	Bill Hird	1952/53	1960/61	14	–	–	–	–	–	–	
293.	Donald Broughton	1952/53	1952/53	1	–	–	–	–	–	–	
294.	Bertie Brownlow	1952/53	1956/57	6	–	–	–	–	–	–	
295.	Ray Stokes	1952/53	1965/66	6	–	–	–	–	–	–	
296.	Byron Hyland	1953/54	1963/64	11	1969/70	1969/70	1	–	–	–	
297.	Ross Dufty	1953/54	1960/61	2	–	–	–	–	–	–	
298.	Bernard Considine	1954/55	1954/55	1	–	–	–	–	–	–	He played for Victoria from 1949/50 to 1952/53.
299.	Brian Richardson	1954/55	1969/70	4	1969/70	1969/70	1	–	–	–	
300.	Ken MacDonald	1955/56	1955/56	2	–	–	–	–	–	–	
301.	Dennis Blair	1956/57	1956/57	2	–	–	–	–	–	–	
302.	David McGuire	1956/57	1958/59	3	–	–	–	–	–	–	
303.	Harold Pinkus	1956/57	1956/57	2	–	–	–	–	–	–	He scored a century on debut
304.	Roy Brain	1958/59	1958/59	2	–	–	–	–	–	–	
305.	Brian Patterson	1958/59	1972/73	16	1969/70	1973/74	5	–	–	–	
306.	Edward Richardson	1958/59	1959/60	3	–	–	–	–	–	–	
307.	Ray Heffernan	1959/60	1967/68	9	–	–	–	–	–	–	
308.	Graeme Hudson	1959/60	1961/62	8	–	–	–	–	–	–	
309.	Thomas Rocher	1959/60	1959/60	2	–	–	–	–	–	–	
310.	Brian Carney	1959/60	1959/60	1	–	–	–	–	–	–	
311.	Brian Sheen	1960/61	1963/64	3	–	–	–	–	–	–	
312.	Gregory Tilyard	1960/61	1960/61	1	–	–	–	–	–	–	
313.	Richard Wallace	1960/61	1960/61	1	–	–	–	–	–	–	
314.	Darrel Baldock	1960/61	1960/61	1	–	–	–	–	–	–	
315.	Gerry Connor	1960/61	1963/64	2	–	–	–	–	–	–	He played for Western Australia in 1958/59.
316.	Ian Cowley	1960/61	1963/64	3	–	–	–	–	–	–	
317.	Ian Crowden	1960/61	1963/64	6	–	–	–	–	–	–	
318.	Kevin Miller	1960/61	1960/61	1	–	–	–	–	–	–	
319.	John Aldridge	1961/62	1963/64	4	–	–	–	–	–	–	He played for Worcestershire from 1956 to 1960.
320.	Leon Braslin	1961/62	1961/62	1	–	–	–	–	–	–	
321.	Barry Harper	1961/62	1968/69	4	–	–	–	–	–	–	
322.	Glen Waters	1961/62	1961/62	3	–	–	–	–	–	–	
323.	Bruce John	1963/64	1963/64	1	–	–	–	–	–	–	
324.	Len Maddocks	1963/64	1967/68	3	–	–	–	–	–	–	He played 11 Tests for Australia from 1954/55 to 1956/57 and for Victoria from 1946/47 to 1961/62.
325.	Harold Allen	1965/66	1970/71	8	1969/70	1973/74	3	–	–	–	
326.	Daniel Archer	1965/66	1965/66	1	–	–	–	–	–	–	
327.	Kevin Brown	1965/66	1969/70	4	1969/70	1970/71	2	–	–	–	
328.	Graeme Farrell	1965/66	1969/70	5	–	–	–	–	–	–	
329.	Kerry Flint	1965/66	1965/66	1	–	–	–	–	–	–	
330.	Kerry Hooper	1965/66	1972/73	2	1972/73	1972/73	1	–	–	–	
331.	Brent Palfreyman	1965/66	1972/73	4	1970/71	1971/72	2	–	–	–	
332.	Ray Biffin	1967/68	1967/68	1	–	–	–	–	–	–	
333.	Gregory Blair	1967/68	1967/68	1	–	–	–	–	–	–	He played for Victoria in 1968/69.
334.	John Hampshire	1967/68	1978/79	14	1977/78	1978/79	7	–	–	–	He played Test cricket for England from 1969 to 1975 and ODI cricket in 1970/71 and 1971/72. He played first-class and List A cricket for Yorkshire and Derbyshire from 1961 to 1984.
335.	Lyndon Menegon	1967/68	1970/71	2	–	–	–	–	–	–	
336.	Don Pearce	1967/68	1968/69	2	–	–	–	–	–	–	
337.	Baden Sharman	1967/68	1969/70	3	1969/70	1969/70	1	–	–	–	
338.	Kevin Badcock	1968/69	1975/76	9	1969/70	1976/77	9	–	–	–	
339.	Michael Gandy	1968/69	1968/69	1	–	–	–	–	–	–	
340.	Neil Hawke	1968/69	1968/69	1	–	–	–	–	–	–	He played 27 Tests between 1962/63 and 1968. He played for Western Australia in 1959/60 and for South Australia from 1960/61 to 1967/68.
341.	Alan Jacobson	1968/69	1968/69	1	–	–	–	–	–	–	
342.	Barry Stewart	1968/69	1968/69	1	–	–	–	–	–	–	

=== Players whose debut was between 1969 and 1985 ===
No	Name	First	Last	Apps	First	Last	Apps	First	Last	Apps	Notes
No	Name	First-class			List A			Twenty20			Notes
343.	Leslie Appleton	1969/70	1973/74	6	1969/70	1974/75	6	–	–	–	
344.	Bruce Hodgetts	1969/70	1970/71	3	1969/70	1970/71	2	–	–	–	
345.	Stephen Howard	1969/70	1978/79	19	1969/70	1978/79	16	–	–	–	
346.	Rohan Kanhai	1969/70	1969/70	2	–	–	–	–	–	–	He played 79 Test matches and seven ODIs for West Indies.
347.	Alan Knott	1969/70	1969/70	2	1969/70	1969/70	1	–	–	–	He played 95 Test matches and 20 ODIs for England.
348.	Brian Cartledge	1970/71	1972/73	3	1970/71	1972/73	3	–	–	–	
349.	Rodney Cass	1970/71	1972/73	3	1970/71	1972/73	2	–	–	–	He played for Essex from 1964 to 1967 and for Worcestershire from 1969 to 1975.
350.	Khalid Ibadulla	1970/71	1971/72	2	1970/71	1971/72	2	–	–	–	He played four Test matches for Pakistan from 1964/65 to 1967. He played for Warwickshire from 1954 to 1972 and for Otago from 1964/65 to 1966/67.
351.	Peter Roberts	1970/71	1974/75	4	1972/73	1974/75	4	–	–	–	
352.	Gary Knight	–	–	–	1971/72	1973/74	2	–	–	–	Brother of Robert Knight.
353.	Graeme Miller	–	–	–	1971/72	1971/72	1	–	–	–	Brother of Kevin Miller.
354.	Tony Benneworth	1971/72	1978/79	13	1971/72	1981/82	10	–	–	–	
355.	Peter Gatenby	1971/72	1971/72	1	1971/72	1971/72	1	–	–	–	
356.	Peter Lever	1971/72	1971/72	1	1971/72	1971/72	1	–	–	–	He played 17 Tests for England between 1970/71 and 1975. He played first-class and List A cricket for Lancashire from 1960 to 1983.
357.	Bruce Doolan	1972/73	1977/78	11	1972/73	1977/78	11	–	–	–	
358.	Jack Simmons	1972/73	1978/79	19	1972/73	1978/79	15	–	–	–	He played for Lancashire from 1968 to 1989.
359.	Michael Leedham	1973/74	1981/82	3	1973/74	1975/76	2	–	–	–	
360.	Sadiq Mohammad	1974/75	1974/75	2	1973/74	1974/75	3	–	–	–	He played 41 Test matches and 19 ODIs for Pakistan from 1969/70 to 1981/82.
361.	Robert Panitzki	1973/74	1975/76	4	1974/75	1975/76	3	–	–	–	
362.	Kenneth Thomson	1973/74	1973/74	1	–	–	–	–	–	–	
363.	Gary Whitney	1973/74 1	1978/79	8	1973/74 1	1978/79	7	–	–	–	
364.	Jim Wilkinson	1973/74	1974/75	3	1974/75	1976/77	2	–	–	–	
365.	Trevor Docking	1976/77	1979/80	15	1974/75	1980/81	16	–	–	–	
366.	Graeme Mansfield	1974/75	1976/77	3	1974/75	1975/76	3	–	–	–	
367.	Barry Beard	1974/75	1974/75	2	1974/75	1974/75	1	–	–	–	
368.	Peter Warren	1974/75	1976/77	3	1974/75	1976/77	2	–	–	–	
369.	Gerald Davies	1974/75	1974/75	1	–	–	–	–	–	–	
370.	David Hughes	1975/76	1976/77	2	1975/76	1976/77	3	–	–	–	He played for Lancashire from 1967 to 1991.
371.	Michael Norman	1975/76	1978/79	11	1975/76	1978/79	5	–	–	–	
372.	Craig Brown	1975/76	1976/77	2	1975/76	1976/77	2	–	–	–	-
373.	Michael Sellers	1975/76	1976/77	3	1975/76	1978/79	3	–	–	–	
374.	Rowan Sherriff	1976/77	1978/79	6	1975/76	1979/80	10	–	–	–	
375.	Christopher Hargrave	1976/77	1980/81	5	–	–	–	–	–	–	
376.	Colin Arnold	1976/77	1976/77	1	–	–	–	–	–	–	
377.	Ray Brown	1976/77	1976/77	1	–	–	–	–	–	–	
378.	Garry Cowmeadow	1976/77	1978/79	13	1977/78	1978/79	8	–	–	–	
379.	Dennis Baker	1977/78	1977/78	6	1977/78	1977/78	4	–	–	–	He played for Western Australia from 1972/73 to 1981/82, except for this one season with Tasmania.
380.	Bruce Neill	1977/78	1977/78	3	1977/78	1977/78	1	–	–	–	
381.	Blair Campbell	1977/78	1979/80	10	–	–	–	–	–	–	
382.	David Smith	1977/78	1983/84	29	1977/78	1983/84	14	–	–	–	
383.	Roger Woolley	1977/78	1987/88	77	1977/78	1986/87	25	–	–	–	He played two Tests in 1982/83 and 1983/84 and four ODIs in 1982/83.
384.	Robert Knight	1977/78	1981/82	14	1978/79	1980/81	2	–	–	–	Brother of Gary Knight.
385.	David Gatenby	1978/79	1978/79	4	–	–	–	–	–	–	He played first-class and List A cricket for Canterbury in 1972/73.
386.	David Boon	1978/79	1998/99	139	1978/79	1998/99	64	–	–	–	He played 107 Tests between 1984/85 and 1995/96 and 181 ODIs between 1983/84 and 1994/95.
387.	Gary Goodman	1978/79	1985/86	29	1978/79	1992/93	12	–	–	–	He played for South Australia in 1980/81.
388.	Mark Scholes	1978/79	1981/82	8	1978/79	1980/81	5	–	–	–	
389.	Greg Wilson	1979/80	1981/82	9	1978/79	1981/82	7	–	–	–	
390.	Neil Majewski	1978/79	1979/80	5	1979/80	1979/80	4	–	–	–	
391.	Brian Davison	1979/80	1987/88	49	1979/80	1987/88	18	–	–	–	He played for Rhodesia from 1967/68 to 1978/79, for Leicestershire from 1970 to 1983 and for Gloucestershire in 1985.
392.	Richard Hadlee	1979/80	1979/80	6	1979/80	1979/80	4	–	–	–	He played 86 Tests and 115 ODIs for New Zealand.
393.	Robert Jeffery	1979/80	1981/82	20	1979/80	1981/82	9	–	–	–	He played for New South Wales in 1978/79.
394.	Phillip Blizzard	1979/80	1983/84	26	1980/81	1987/88	14	–	–	–	He played for New South Wales in 1985/86.
395.	Chris Broadby	1979/80	1987/88	10	1980/81	1980/81	1	–	–	–	
396.	Stuart Saunders	1979/80	1988/89	56	1982/83	1983/84	6	–	–	–	
397.	Nick Allanby	1980/81	1982/83	6	1980/81	1982/83	4	–	–	–	
398.	Peter Clough	1980/81	1983/84	35	1980/81	1983/84	10	–	–	–	He played for Western Australia in 1984/85 and 1985/86.
399.	Rod McCurdy	1980/81	1980/81	7	1980/81	1980/81	3	–	–	–	He played 11 ODIs in 1984/85.
400.	David Robinson	1980/81	1981/82	9	1980/81	1981/82	3	–	–	–	He played for Victoria in 1984/85.
401.	Anthony Spillane	–	–	–	1980/81	1980/81	2	–	–	–	
402.	Anthony Walters	–	–	–	1980/81	1980/81	1	–	–	–	
403.	Leslie Allen	1980/81	1983/84	7	1980/81	1981/82	3	–	–	–	
404.	Ian Beven	1980/81	1983/84	18	1980/81	1983/84	8	–	–	–	He also played first-class and List A cricket for Scotland and for Scotland in the 1996/97 ICC Trophy.
405.	Peter Faulkner	1982/83	1989/90	42	1980/81	1988/89	11	–	–	–	He toured South Africa with "rebel" Australian XIs in 1985/86 and 1986/87. Father of James Faulkner.
406.	Dale O'Halloran	1980/81	1980/81	1	–	–	–	–	–	–	
407.	Peter Mancell	1981/82	1982/83	13	1981/82	1982/83	2	–	–	–	
408.	Franklyn Stephenson	1981/82	1981/82	7	1981/82	1981/82	2	–	–	–	He played first-class and List A cricket for domestic teams in West Indies, England and South Africa as well.
409.	David Mullett	1981/82	1981/82	1	–	–	–	–	–	–	
410.	Stanley Reid	1981/82	1982/83	11	1982/83	1982/83	2	–	–	–	
411.	Emmanuel Benjamin	1981/82	1981/82	1	–	–	–	–	–	–	He played first-class cricket for Punjab from 1973/74 to 1977/78.
412.	Roland Butcher	1982/83	1982/83	12	1982/83	1982/83	3	–	–	–	He played three Tests for England in 1980/81 and three ODIs in 1980 and 1980/81.
413.	Michael Holding	1982/83	1982/83	9	1982/83	1982/83	3	–	–	–	He played 60 Tests and 102 ODIs for West Indies between 1975/76 and 1986/87.
414.	Mark Ray	1982/83	1985/86	41	1982/83	1985/86	5	–	–	–	He played first-class cricket for New South Wales in 1981/82.
415.	Steve Small	1982/83	1983/84	13	1982/83	1983/84	4	–	–	–	He played first-class and List A cricket for New South Wales between 1978/79 and 1992/93.
416.	William Kirkman	1982/83	1986/87	4	1984/85	1984/85	1	–	–	–	
417.	Graham Astley	1983/84	1983/84	1	1983/84	1983/84	2	–	–	–	
418.	Francis Woolley	–	–	–	1983/84	1983/84	2	–	–	–	
419.	Danny Buckingham	1983/84	1993/94	83	1983/84	1993/94	23	–	–	–	
420.	Roland Hyatt	1983/84	1985/86	21	1983/84	1985/86	5	–	–	–	
421.	Neil Williams	1983/84	1983/84	7	1983/84	1983/84	1	–	–	–	He played in one Test for England in 1990.
422.	Richard Soule	1983/84	1990/91	57	1986/87	1989/90	11	–	–	–	
423.	Keith Bradshaw	1984/85	1987/88	25	1984/85	1987/88	9	–	–	–	
424.	Roger Brown	1984/85	1986/87	31	1984/85	1986/87	7	–	–	–	
425.	Patrick Patterson	1984/85	1984/85	10	1984/85	1984/85	2	–	–	–	He played 28 Tests and 59 ODIs for West Indies between 1985/86 and 1992/93.
426.	Michael Tame	1984/85	1986/87	8	1984/85	1986/87	8	–	–	–	
427.	Richard Bennett	1984/85	1991/92	35	1985/86	1985/86	1	–	–	–	

=== Players whose debut was between 1985 and 2000 ===
No	Name	First	Last	Apps	First	Last	Apps	First	Last	Apps	Notes
No	Name	First-class			List A			Twenty20			Notes
428.	Winston Davis	1985/86	1985/86	8	1985/86	1985/86	2	–	–	–	He played 15 Tests and 35 ODIs for West Indies between 1982/83 and 1987/88.
429.	Mark Hill	1985/86	1985/86	5	1985/86	1985/86	2	–	–	–	
430.	Lynton Rowlands	–	–	–	1985/86	1985/86	1	–	–	–	
431.	Troy Cooley	1985/86	1995/96	33	1995/96	1995/96	3	–	–	–	
432.	Christopher Dell	1985/86	1985/86	1	–	–	–	–	–	–	
433.	Errol Harris	1985/86	1987/88	14	1986/87	1986/87	2	–	–	–	He played one List A match for Queensland in 1991/92.
434.	Bruce Cruse	1985/86	1992/93	25	1987/88	1991/92	2	–	–	–	
435.	Peter Bowler	1986/87	1986/87	2	1986/87	1986/87	2	–	–	–	Though brought up in Australia, most of his cricket was in England between 1986 and 2004, for Leicestershire, Derbyshire and Somerset.
436.	Richard Ellison	1986/87	1986/87	9	1986/87	1986/87	3	–	–	–	He played in 11 Tests and 14 ODIs for England between 1984 and 1986.
437.	Glenn Hughes	1986/87	1991/92	40	1986/87	1991/92	12	–	–	–	He played for Orange Free State in 1989/90. Brother of Kim Hughes.
438.	Allister de Winter	1986/87	1989/90	21	1986/87	1992/93	10	–	–	–	
439.	Stephen Milosz	1986/87	1986/87	11	1986/87	1986/87	1	–	–	–	He played for Western Australia between 1983/84 and 1987/88.
440.	Robert Gartrell	1986/87	1986/87	3	–	–	–	–	–	–	He played for Western Australia in 1984/85 and 1985/86.
441.	Neville Jelich	1986/87	1987/88	9	1986/87	1986/87	2	–	–	–	He played for Queensland in 1985/86.
442.	Greg Campbell	1986/87	1991/92	29	1988/89	1991/92	10	–	–	–	He played four Tests and 12 ODIs in 1989 and 1989/90.
443.	Tim Bower	1987/88	1991/92	15	1989/90	1993/94	2	–	–	–	
444.	Michael Taylor	1987/88	1988/89	19	1987/88	1988/89	4	–	–	–	He played for Victoria from 1977/78 to 1984/85.
445.	Jamie Cox	1987/88	2005/06	171	1988/89	2003/04	82	–	–	–	He played for Somerset in English domestic first-class, List A and T20 cricket from 1999 to 2004.
446.	Dennis Lillee	1987/88	1987/88	6	1987/88	1987/88	1	–	–	–	He played 70 Tests and 63 ODIs between 1970/71 and 1983/84.
447.	Nicholas Courtney	1987/88	1994/95	24	1992/93	1995/96	12	–	–	–	Nickname = The Beast
448.	Claye Young	1987/88	1987/88	3	–	–	–	–	–	–	
449.	Rod Tucker	1988/89	1998/99	100	1987/88	1998/99	45	–	–	–	He played for New South Wales from 1985/86 to 1987/88.
450.	Dave Gilbert	1988/89	1991/92	38	1988/89	1991/92	9	–	–	–	He played nine Tests and 14 ODIs between 1985 and 1986/87.
451.	Greg Shipperd	1988/89	1990/91	26	1988/89	1990/91	4	–	–	–	He played for Western Australia from 1977/78 to 1987/88.
452.	Dirk Wellham	1988/89	1990/91	32	1988/89	1990/91	7	–	–	–	He played six Tests and 17 ODI between 1981 and 1986/87.
453.	Scott Hookey	1989/90	1989/90	7	1989/90	1991/92	3	–	–	–	He played for New South Wales in 1987/88 and 1994/95.
454.	Don O'Connor	1989/90	1989/90	2	1989/90	1989/90	2	–	–	–	He played for South Australia between 1981/82 and 1987/88.
455.	Gavin Robertson	1989/90	1990/91	17	1989/90	1990/91	5	–	–	–	He played in four Tests and 13 ODIs between 1994 and 1998/99. He played for New South Wales in 1987/88 and from 1992/93 to 1999/2000.
456.	Peter McPhee	1989/90	1992/93	27	1990/91	1992/93	8	–	–	–	Player of the year with a then record 43 wickets in the 90/91 first class season
457.	Michael Farrell	1989/90	1995/96	25	1990/91	1997/98	32	–	–	–	
458.	Shaun Young	1991/92	2001/02	112	1990/91	2001/02	70	–	–	–	He played one Test in 1997. Brother of Claye Young.
459.	Tim Coyle	1990/91	1990/91	7	1990/91	1990/91	1	–	–	–	
460.	Kevin Pearce	1990/91	1990/91	1	–	–	–	–	–	–	
461.	Josef Holyman	1990/91	1991/92	9	1991/92	1991/92	3	–	–	–	
462.	Stuart Oliver	1990/91	1995/96	5	1992/93	1995/96	5	–	–	–	
463.	Chris Matthews	1991/92	1994/95	39	1991/92	1994/95	11	–	–	–	He played three Tests between 1986/87 and 1988/89. He played for Western Australia between 1984/85 and 1990/91.
464.	Dene Hills	1991/92	2001/02	109	1992/93	2001/02	46	–	–	–	
465.	Mark Atkinson	1991/92	1999/2000	94	1992/93	1999/2000	41	–	–	–	
466.	Michael Di Venuto	1991/92	2007/08	145	1992/93	2007/08	110	2005/06	2006/07	6	He played nine ODIs between 1996/97 and 1997/98.
467.	Colin Miller	1992/93	1999/2000	57	1992/93	1999/2000	36	–	–	–	He played 18 Tests between 1998/99 and 2000/01. He also played for South Australia and Victoria.
468.	Ricky Ponting	1992/93	2010/11	58	1992/93	2007/08	43	–	–	–	He played 168 Tests and 376 ODIs (one for an International XI).
469.	Nigel Brookes	–	–	–	1992/93	1992/93	1	–	–	–	
470.	Ian Connell	–	–	–	1992/93	1992/93	1	–	–	–	
471.	David Castle	1992/93	1992/93	1	–	–	–	–	–	–	
472.	Mark Ridgway	1993/94	1999/2000	46	1993/94	1999/2000	23	–	–	–	
473.	Steven Herzberg	1993/94	1993/94	7	1993/94	1993/94	1	–	–	–	He also played for Western Australia, Kent, Somerset and Worcestershire.
474.	Scott Plummer	–	–	–	1993/94	1993/94	1	–	–	–	
475.	Anthony Humphreys	1993/94	1993/94	1	–	–	–	–	–	–	
476.	Brian Robinson	1993/94	1994/95	7	1994/95	1994/95	3	–	–	–	
477.	Mark Wasley	1994/95	1994/95	1	1994/95	1994/95	3	–	–	–	He played first-class cricket for Western Australia in 1990/91.
478.	Andy Belsak	–	–	–	1994/95	1994/95	1	–	–	–	
479.	David Millns	1994/95	1994/95	6	1994/95	1994/95	1	–	–	–	He played for Nottinghamshire and Leicestershire between 1988 and 2001.
480.	Richard Allanby	1994/95	1994/95	2	1996/97	1996/97	2	–	–	–	Brother of Nick Allanby.
481.	Mark Hatton	1994/95	1996/97	14	1994/95	1995/96	6	–	–	–	
482.	Todd Pinnington	1994/95	2000/01	2	1998/99	2000/01	7	–	–	–	
483.	Anthony Daly	1994/95	1995/96	13	1994/95	1996/97	6	–	–	–	
484.	Josh Marquet	1994/95	1997/98	22	1994/95	2001/02	17	–	–	–	
485.	Adam McGinty	–	–	–	1994/95	1994/95	1	–	–	–	He played first-class cricket for Victoria in 1995/96 and 1996/97.
486.	Gerard Denton	1994/95	2009/10	40	1995/96	2010/11	23	2008/09	2009/10	7	He played for Victoria between 2004/05 and 2007/08.
487.	Robert Hodgson	1995/96	1998/99	3	1995/96	1995/96	2	–	–	–	
488.	John Saint	1995/96	1996/97	4	1995/96	1997/98	6	–	–	–	
489.	Daniel Marsh	1996/97	2009/10	137	1996/97	2009/10	105	2006/07	2008/09	13	He played for South Australia in 1993/94 and for Leicestershire in 2001.
490.	Andrew Saballus	1996/97	1996/97	1	1996/97	1996/97	2	–	–	–	
491.	Andrew Dykes	1998/99	2000/01	18	1996/97	2000/01	17	–	–	–	
492.	Paul Hutchison	1996/97	1997/98	3	1996/97	1997/98	6	–	–	–	He played for South Australia from 1991/92 to 1994/95.
493.	Damien Wright	1997/98	2006/07	65	1997/98	2006/07	55	2006/07	2006/07	4	He played for Victoria from 2008/09 and for five English counties.
494.	Ben Targett	1997/98	2000/01	16	1997/98	1999/2000	5	–	–	–	
495.	Scott Mason	1997/98	2003/04	28	1999/2000	2001/02	8	–	–	–	
496.	Greg Rowell	1998/99	1998/99	6	1998/99	1998/99	4	–	–	–	He played for New South Wales from 1989/90 to 1990/91 and for Queensland from 1991/92 to 1997/98.
497.	Scott Kremerskothen	1999/2000	2005/06	37	1998/99	2005/06	44	–	–	–	
498.	Andrew Downton	1999/2000	2004/05	32	1999/2000	2003/04	4	–	–	–	
499.	Shannon Tubb	1999/2000	2005/06	12	2001/02	2005/06	10	2005/06	2005/06	2	He played List A cricket for South Australia in 2004/05.

=== Players whose debut was after 2000 ===
No	Name	First	Last	Apps	First	Last	Apps	First	Last	Apps	Notes
No	Name	First-class			List A			Twenty20			Notes
500.	Sean Clingeleffer	2000/01	2007/08	74	2000/01	2003/04	40	–	–	–	
501.	Brett Geeves	2004/05	2009/10	41	2000/01	2010/11	64	2007/08	2009/10	10	He played ODI and international T20 matches in 2008 and 2008/09.
502.	David Saker	2000/01	2002/03	23	2000/01	2001/02	16	–	–	–	He played for Victoria from 1994/95 to 1999/2000.
503.	Mark Colegrave	2000/01	2000/01	1	–	–	–	–	–	–	
504.	Shane Watson	2000/01	2003/04	26	2000/01	2003/04	30	–	–	–	He played 30 Tests, 138 ODIs, and 24 International T20 matches. He also played for Queensland and New South Wales.
505.	Graeme Cunningham	2002/03	2002/03	2	2000/01	2002/03	23	–	–	–	He played List A cricket for Australian Capital Territory in 1998/99 and 1999/2000.
506.	Kade Munday	–	–	–	2000/01	2000/01	1	–	–	–	
507.	Adam Polkinghorne	2002/03	2005/06	2	2000/01	2005/06	18	2005/06	2006/07	5	
508.	Brad Thomas	2001/02	2001/02	1	2000/01	2001/02	4	–	–	–	
509.	Shane Jurgensen	2000/01	2002/03	17	2001/02	2002/03	6	–	–	–	He played for Western Australia in 1998/99 and for Queensland from 2003/04 to 2006/07.
510.	Michael Dighton	2001/02	2008/09	53	2001/02	2009/10	74	2006/07	2009/10	16	He played for Western Australia from 1997/98 to 1999/2000 and for Derbyshire in 2007.
511.	Xavier Doherty	2001/02	2010/11	40	2001/02	2010/11	82	2005/06	2010/11	24	He played two Tests and 13 ODIs from 2010/11.
512.	George Bailey	2004/05	2016/17	101	2001/02	2010/11	120	2005/06	2010/11	26	Bailey played five tests for Australia, 29 T20's (25 as captain) and 90 ODI's (40 as captain).
513.	Matthew Pascoe	–	–	–	2001/02	2001/02	1	–	–	–	He played for Queensland in 1998/99 and 2000/01.
514.	Adam Griffith	2002/03	2010/11	45	2002/03	2007/08	47	2005/06	2005/06	2	He played for Leicestershire in 2006.
515.	Ben Oliver	2002/03	2002/03	2	2002/03	2002/03	4	–	–	–	He played for Victoria between 1999/2000 and 2001/02.
516.	Chris Bassano	2002/03	2002/03	2	–	–	–	–	–	–	He played for Derbyshire from 2001 to 2005.
517.	Travis Birt	2004/05	2010/11	50	2003/04	2010/11	73	2005/06	2010/11	27	He played three International T20 matches in 2009/10. He also played for Derbyshire in 2006 and 2007 and for Wellington in 2010/11.
518.	Luke Butterworth	2006/07	2010/11	40	2003/04	2010/11	49	2006/07	2010/11	5	He played List A cricket for Scotland in 2011.
519.	Michael Bevan	2004/05	2006/07	19	2004/05	2006/07	18	–	–	–	He played 18 Tests and 232 ODIs between 1993/94 and 2003/04. He played for South Australia in 1989/90, for New South Wales from 1990/91 to 2003/04 and for four English county sides.
520.	David Dawson	2004/05	2008/09	23	2004/05	2008/09	10	–	–	–	
521.	Andy Blignaut	2004/05	2004/05	1	–	–	–	–	–	–	He played 19 Tests, 54 ODIs and one International T20 for Zimbabwe between 1999 and 2010.
522.	Rhett Lockyear	2004/05	2009/10	15	2005/06	2010/11	21	2005/06	2010/11	23	
523.	Darren McNees	2004/05	2005/06	3	2005/06	2005/06	3	2005/06	2005/06	2	
524.	Ben Hilfenhaus	2005/06	2010/11	43	2005/06	2010/11	41	2005/06	2010/11	14	He played 17 Tests, 15 ODIs and six International T20s since 2006/07.
525.	Dane Anderson	2006/07	2008/09	7	2005/06	2008/09	24	2005/06	2007/08	10	
526.	Tim Paine	2005/06	2010/11	36	2005/06	2010/11	46	2005/06	2010/11	18	He played four Tests, 26 ODIs and five International T20s since 2009.
527.	Brendan Drew	2005/06	2010/11	30	2005/06	2010/11	45	2006/07	2010/11	15	
528.	Chris Duval	2007/08	2008/09	7	2006/07	2008/09	5	2008/09	2008/09	2	He played for South Australia before and after playing for Tasmania.
529.	Jason Krejza	2006/07	2010/11	23	2006/07	2010/11	24	2007/08	2010/11	17	He played two Tests and eight ODIs from 2008/09. He played for New South Wales in 2004/05 and 2005/06.
530.	Matthew Wade	–	–	–	2006/07	2006/07	1	–	–	–	He has played for Victoria since 2007/08.
531.	Mark Divin	–	–	–	2007/08	2008/09	13	2007/08	2008/09	8	
532.	Nathan Wegman	–	–	–	2007/08	2007/08	2	2007/08	2007/08	1	
533.	Tim MacDonald	2007/08	2009/10	20	2007/08	2007/08	1	–	–	–	He played for Western Australia in 2006/07.
534.	Jonathan Wells	2008/09	2010/11	17	2010/11	2010/11	9	2010/11	2010/11	5	
535.	James Faulkner	2008/09	2010/11	14	2008/09	2010/11	18	2009/10	2010/11	11	Son of Peter Faulkner.
536.	Alex Doolan	2008/09	2010/11	23	2010/11	2010/11	5	2009/10	2009/10	3	
537.	Jeremy Smith	2008/09	2008/09	1	2008/09	2010/11	2	–	–	–	
538.	Ed Cowan	2009/10	2010/11	21	2009/10	2010/11	22	2009/10	2010/11	3	He played for Oxford University in 2003 and for New South Wales from 2004/05 to 2008/09.
539.	Brady Jones	2009/10	2010/11	12	2009/10	2010/11	4	–	–	–	
540.	Wade Irvine	–	–	–	2009/10	2009/10	1	–	–	–	
541.	Adam Maher	2009/10	2010/11	13	–	–	–	–	–	–	
542.	Rana Naved-ul-Hasan	–	–	–	–	–	–	2009/10	2010/11	12	
543.	John Rogers	2009/10	2009/10	1	–	–	–	2009/10	2009/10	3	
544.	Steven Cazzulino	2010/11	2010/11	2	–	–	–	–	–	–	
545.	Mark Cosgrove	2010/11	2010/11	11	2010/11	2010/11	11	2010/11	2010/11	7	He played three ODIs in 2005/06 and 2006/07. He played for South Australia from 2002/03 to 2009/10 and for Glamorgan from 2006 to 2010.
546.	Matthew Day	–	–	–	2010/11	2010/11	1	–	–	–	
547.	Ryan ten Doeschate	–	–	–	–	–	–	2010/11	2010/11	7	He played 33 ODIs for Netherlands. He has played for Essex since 2003.
548.	Nick Kruger	2010/11	2010/11	5	2010/11	2010/11	1	–	–	–	He played for Queensland from 2002/03 to 2009/10.
549.	Tom Triffitt	2010/11	2010/11	4	2010/11	2010/11	3	–	–	–	
550	Simon Milenko	2016/17	2016/17	3	2016/17	2016/17		-	-	-	He plays for Tasmania and the Hobart Hurricanes.
