= Barry Stewart =

Barry Stewart can refer to:

- Barry Stewart (Australian cricketer) (1940-1975), Australian cricketer
- Barry Stewart (English cricketer) (born 1980), English cricketer
- Barry Stewart (rugby union) (born 1976), Scottish rugby union player
