= Nicholas Clayton =

Nicholas Clayton may refer to:

- Nicholas J. Clayton (1840–1916), architect
- Nicholas Clayton (cricketer) (1826–1867), Australian cricketer
- Nicholas Clayton (divine) (1733–1797), English Presbyterian minister
