= John Mace =

John Mace can refer to:

- John Mace (Australian cricketer) (1839–1906), Australian cricketer
- John Mace (English cricketer) (1828–1905), English cricketer
- John Mace (New Zealand Army officer) (1932–2026), New Zealand military commander
