= George Matson =

Australian cricketer

Personal information
- Born: 5 December 1817; Rochester, Kent, England
- Died: 22 July 1898 (aged 80); Brighton, England

Domestic team information
- Years: Team
- 1853-1858: Tasmania
- Source: Cricinfo, 5 January 2016

George Matson (5 December 1817 – 22 July 1898) was an Australian cricketer. He played two first-class matches for Tasmania between 1853 and 1858.

== See also ==
- List of Tasmanian representative cricketers
