= Peter Roberts (cricketer) =

Australian cricketer (born 1952)

Personal information
- Born: 16 February 1952 (age 74); Hobart, Tasmania, Australia

Domestic team information
- Years: Team
- 1970-1975: Tasmania
- Source: Cricinfo, 13 March 2016

Peter Roberts (born 16 February 1952) is an Australian former cricketer. He played six first-class matches for Tasmania between 1970 and 1975.

== See also ==
- List of Tasmanian representative cricketers
