= Sidney Lord =

Australian cricketer

Personal information
- Born: 20 October 1886
- Died: Unknown

Domestic team information
- Years: Team
- 1914/15: Tasmania
- Source: Cricinfo, 24 January 2016

Sidney Lord (born 20 October 1886, date of death unknown) was an Australian cricketer. He played one first-class match for Tasmania in 1914/15.

== See also ==
- List of Tasmanian representative cricketers
