= John Walshe (cricketer) =

Australian cricketer

John Hamilton Walshe (1841 – 17 April 1893) was an Australian cricketer who played for Tasmania. He was born in England and died in Hobart. He committed suicide by cutting his own throat with a razor.

== Career ==
Walshe made a single first-class appearance for the team, during the 1872–73 season, against Victoria. Batting last in the order he scored 7 and 0, both times being not out. Walshe bowled in both innings too, taking 3 for 34 and 0 for 8. He was associated with the Wellington Cricket Club in Hobart for some years.

== Suicide ==
For a few years Walshe was an engrossing clerk with the Tasmanian Lands Office, but was on sick leave for a while before his death. An inquest found that he had committed suicide by cutting his throat with a razor.

== See also ==
- List of Tasmanian representative cricketers
