= Arthur Marriott =

English-born Australian cricketer

Personal information
- Full name: Arthur John Marriott
- Born: c. 1821; England
- Died: 31 March 1866 (aged 44–45); Nice, France

Domestic team information
- Years: Team
- 1852: Tasmania
- Only First-class: 29 March 1852 Tasmania v Victoria

Career statistics
| Competition | First-class |
|---|---|
| Matches | 1 |
| Runs scored | 9 |
| Batting average | 4.50 |
| 100s/50s | 0/0 |
| Top score | 7 |
| Catches/stumpings | 0/– |
- Source: CricketArchive, 17 August 2010

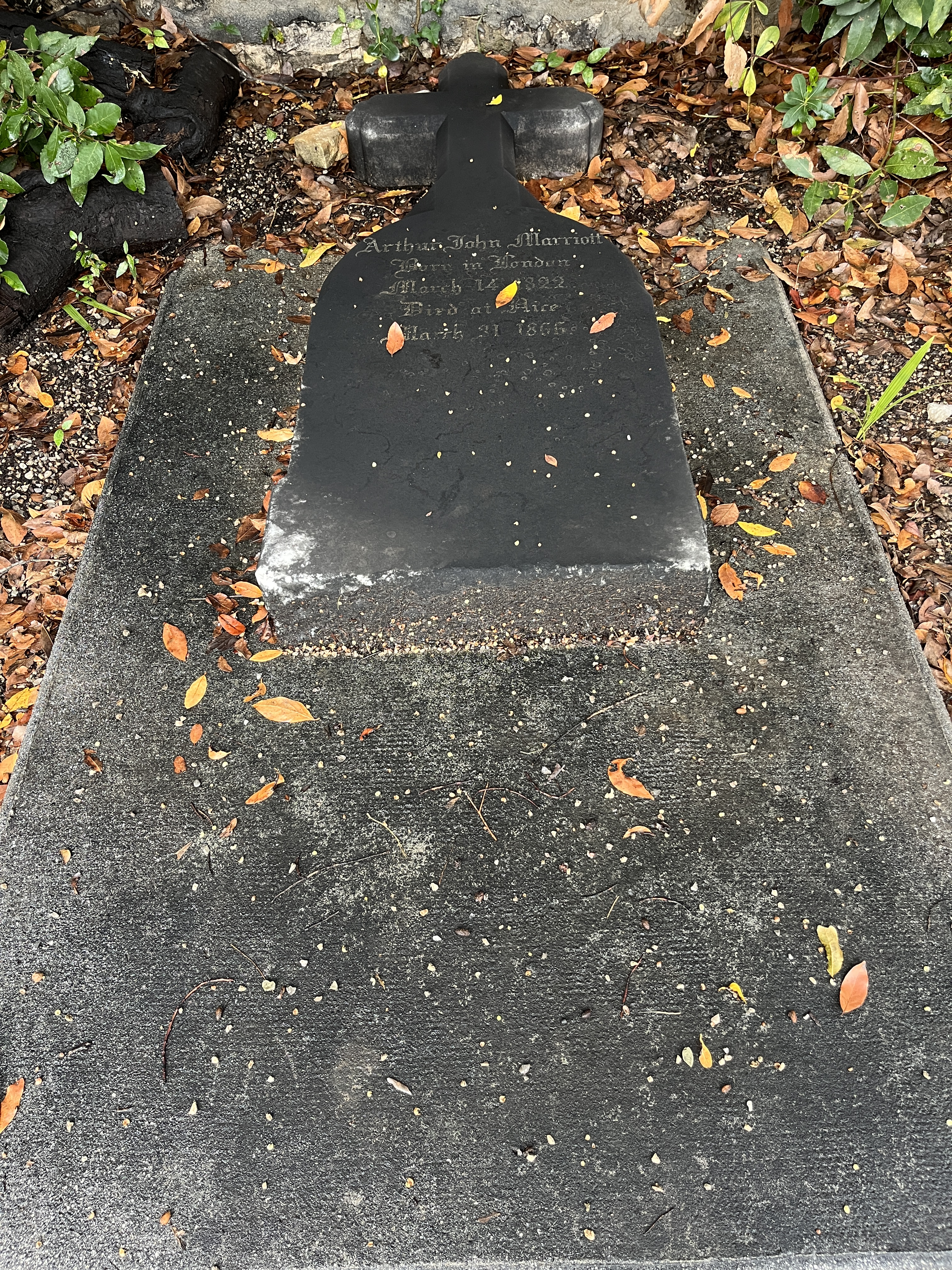
Grave of Arthur John Marriott in Ste-Marguerite cemetery in Nice (France - 06)

Arthur Marriott (c. 1821 – 31 March 1866) was an English-born Australian cricketer who played for Tasmania. He was born in England and died in Nice.

Marriott made a single first-class appearance for the side, during the 1851–52 season, against Victoria. From the upper-middle order, he scored 2 runs in the first innings in which he batted, and 7 runs in the second.

== See also ==
- List of Tasmanian representative cricketers
