= Leonard Alexander =

Australian cricketer

Personal information
- Born: 1 September 1921; Hobart, Tasmania, Australia
- Died: 22 July 2012 (aged 90); Hobart, Tasmania, Australia

Domestic team information
- Years: Team
- 1946-1952: Tasmania
- Source: Cricinfo, 8 March 2016

Leonard Alexander (1 September 1921 – 22 July 2012) was an Australian cricketer. He played nine first-class matches for Tasmania between 1946 and 1952.

== See also ==
- List of Tasmanian representative cricketers
