= Richard Kirby (cricketer) =

Australian cricketer

Personal information
- Born: 28 January 1861; Hobart, Tasmania, Australia
- Died: 26 August 1947 (aged 86); Hobart, Tasmania, Australia

Domestic team information
- Years: Team
- 1883-1884: Tasmania
- Source: Cricinfo, 13 January 2016

Richard Kirby (28 January 1861 – 26 August 1947) was an Australian cricketer. He played four first-class matches for Tasmania between 1883 and 1884.

== See also ==
- List of Tasmanian representative cricketers
