= Gregory Wilson (Australian cricketer) =

Australian cricketer (born 1958)

Greg Wilson
Personal information
- Full name: Gregory James Wilson
- Born: 4 January 1958 (age 68); Launceston, Tasmania, Australia
- Batting: Right-handed
- Bowling: Right-arm fast-medium

Domestic team information
- Years: Team
- 1979/80–1981/82: Tasmania

Career statistics
Competition	FC	LA
Matches	9	7
Runs scored	63	38
Batting average	5.25	38.00
100s/50s	–/–	–/–
Top score	19*	13
Balls bowled	1,266	352
Wickets	12	9
Bowling average	58.00	25.66
5 wickets in innings	–	–
10 wickets in match	–	–
Best bowling	2/23	3/33
Catches/stumpings	1/–	–/–
- Source: Cricinfo, 2 January 2011

Gregory James Wilson (born 4 January 1958 in Launceston, Tasmania) was an Australian cricket player, who played for the Tasmania. He was a right-handed batsman and right arm fast-medium bowler who represented Tasmania from 1979 until 1982.

== See also ==
- List of Tasmanian representative cricketers
