= William Bayles (cricketer) =

Australian cricketer

Personal information
- Born: 8 January 1896; Ross, Tasmania, Australia
- Died: 17 December 1960 (aged 64); Launceston, Tasmania, Australia

Domestic team information
- Years: Team
- 1913/14: Tasmania
- Source: Cricinfo, 23 January 2016

William Bayles (8 January 1896 – 17 December 1960) was an Australian cricketer. He played one first-class match for Tasmania in 1913/14.

== See also ==
- List of Tasmanian representative cricketers
