= Douglas Vautin =

Australian cricketer

Personal information
- Born: 26 July 1896; Hobart, Tasmania, Australia
- Died: 11 January 1976 (aged 79); Mount Martha, Victoria, Australia

Domestic team information
- Years: Team
- 1929/30: Tasmania
- Source: Cricinfo, 4 March 2016

Douglas Vautin (26 July 1896 – 11 January 1976) was an Australian cricketer. He played one first-class match for Tasmania in 1929/30.

== See also ==
- List of Tasmanian representative cricketers
