= Weller Arnold =

Australian cricketer

Personal information
- Born: 23 September 1882; Hobart, Tasmania, Australia
- Died: 28 October 1957 (aged 75); Hobart, Tasmania, Australia

Domestic team information
- Years: Team
- 1914/15: Tasmania
- Source: Cricinfo, 24 January 2016

Weller Arnold (23 September 1882 – 28 October 1957) was an Australian cricketer. He played one first-class match for Tasmania in 1914/15.

== See also ==
- List of Tasmanian representative cricketers
