= George Pennefather =

Australian cricketer

Personal information
- Born: 28 September 1864; Launceston, Tasmania, Australia
- Died: 16 October 1945 (aged 81); Launceston, Tasmania, Australia

Domestic team information
- Years: Team
- 1889-1897: Tasmania
- Source: Cricinfo, 14 January 2016

George Pennefather (28 September 1864 – 16 October 1945) was an Australian cricketer. He played two first-class matches for Tasmania between 1889 and 1897.

== See also ==
- List of Tasmanian representative cricketers
