= Eustace Maxwell =

Australian cricketer

Personal information
- Born: 20 January 1864; Hobart, Tasmania, Australia
- Died: 18 May 1939 (aged 75); Hobart, Tasmania, Australia

Domestic team information
- Years: Team
- 1888-1898: Tasmania
- Source: Cricinfo, 13 January 2016

Eustace Maxwell (20 January 1864 – 18 May 1939) was an Australian cricketer. He played five first-class matches for Tasmania between 1888 and 1898.

== See also ==
- List of Tasmanian representative cricketers
