= Gerald Davies (cricketer) =

Australian cricketer (born 1949)

Personal information
- Born: 29 January 1949 (age 77); Cinderford, Gloucestershire, England

Domestic team information
- Years: Team
- 1974-1975: Tasmania
- Source: Cricinfo, 14 March 2016

Gerald Davies (born 29 January 1949) is an Australian former cricketer. He played one first-class match for Tasmania in 1974/75.

== See also ==
- List of Tasmanian representative cricketers
