= Neville Jelich =

Australian cricketer (born 1962)

Personal information
- Full name: Nedelko Jelich
- Born: 11 March 1962 (age 64); Belgrade, Yugoslavia
- Batting: Left-handed

Domestic team information
- Years: Team
- 1986/87–1987/88: Tasmania
- 1985/86: Queensland

Career statistics
Competition	FC	LA
Matches	10	3
Runs scored	490	40
Batting average	27.22	20.00
100s/50s	1/2	–/–
Top score	126	30
Balls bowled	348	24
Wickets	–	2
Bowling average	–	7.50
5 wickets in innings	–	–
10 wickets in match	–	–
Best bowling	–	2/15
Catches/stumpings	1/–	2/–
- Source: Cricinfo, 3 January 2011

Nedelko 'Neville' Jelich (born 11 March 1962) is a Yugoslavian born former Australian cricket player, who played first class cricket for Queensland and Tasmania. He debuted for Queensland in the 1985–86 season, but transferred to Tasmania the following summer, where he played until the end of the 1987–88 season. He was a left-handed middle order batsman, and scored one first class century.

He was born at Orasje, near Belgrade in the former Yugoslavia.

== See also ==
- List of Tasmanian representative cricketers
