= James Martin (Australian cricketer) =

Australian cricketer

Personal information
- Born: 25 February 1851; Launceston, Van Diemen's Land
- Died: 22 October 1930 (aged 79); Launceston, Tasmania, Australia

Domestic team information
- Years: Team
- 1872: Tasmania
- Source: Cricinfo, 12 January 2016

James Martin (25 February 1851 – 22 October 1930) was an Australian cricketer. He played one first-class match for Tasmania in 1872.

== See also ==
- List of Tasmanian representative cricketers
