= Gordon Gibson (cricketer) =

Australian cricketer

Personal information
- Born: 1 November 1908; Hobart, Tasmania, Australia
- Died: 7 July 1967 (aged 58); Melbourne, Australia

Domestic team information
- Years: Team
- 1928-1933: Tasmania
- Source: Cricinfo, 4 March 2016

Gordon Gibson (1 November 1908 – 7 July 1967) was an Australian cricketer. He played six first-class matches for Tasmania between 1928 and 1933.

== See also ==
- List of Tasmanian representative cricketers
