= Les Richardson =

Australian cricketer

Personal information
- Born: 9 January 1887; Sandford, Tasmania, Australia
- Died: 15 November 1962 (aged 75); Hobart, Tasmania, Australia

Domestic team information
- Years: Team
- 1921/22: Tasmania
- Source: Cricinfo, 24 January 2016

Les Richardson (9 January 1887 – 15 November 1962) was an Australian cricketer. He played one first-class match for Tasmania in 1921/22.

== See also ==
- List of Tasmanian representative cricketers
