= Trevor Gordon (cricketer) =

Australian cricketer

Personal information
- Born: 18 February 1915; Hobart, Tasmania, Australia
- Died: 22 October 2011 (aged 96); Hobart, Tasmania, Australia

Domestic team information
- Years: Team
- 1948-1949: Tasmania
- Source: Cricinfo, 8 March 2016

Trevor Gordon (18 February 1915 – 22 October 2011) was an Australian cricketer. He played two first-class matches for Tasmania in 1948/49.

== See also ==
- List of Tasmanian representative cricketers
