= John Howe (cricketer) =

Australian cricketer

Personal information
- Born: 27 December 1868; Kotree, India
- Died: 29 July 1939 (aged 70); Neutral Bay, New South Wales, Australia

Domestic team information
- Years: Team
- 1894: Tasmania
- Source: Cricinfo, 16 January 2016

John Howe (27 December 1868 – 29 July 1939) was an Australian cricketer. He played one first-class match for Tasmania in 1894.

== See also ==
- List of Tasmanian representative cricketers
