= Thomas Ryan (cricketer) =

Australian cricketer

Personal information
- Born: 4 May 1865; Hobart, Tasmania, Australia
- Died: 20 April 1921 (aged 55); Hobart, Tasmania, Australia

Domestic team information
- Years: Team
- 1888-1890: Tasmania
- Source: Cricinfo, 13 January 2016

Thomas Ryan (4 May 1865 – 20 April 1921) was an Australian cricketer. He played two first-class matches for Tasmania between 1888 and 1890.

== See also ==
- List of Tasmanian representative cricketers
