= Louis Sams =

Australian cricketer

Personal information
- Born: 26 August 1863; Westbury, Tasmania, Australia
- Died: 6 July 1941 (aged 77); Brisbane, Australia

Domestic team information
- Years: Team
- 1883-1884: Tasmania
- Source: Cricinfo, 13 January 2016

Louis Sams (26 August 1863 – 6 July 1941) was an Australian cricketer. He played four first-class matches for Tasmania between 1883 and 1884.

== See also ==
- List of Tasmanian representative cricketers
