= Edward Freeman (cricketer, born 1848) =

Australian cricketer

Personal information
- Born: 7 November 1848; Hobart, Van Diemen's Land
- Died: 11 August 1905 (aged 56); Hobart, Tasmania, Australia

Domestic team information
- Years: Team
- 1872: Tasmania
- Source: Cricinfo, 12 January 2016

Edward Freeman (7 November 1848 – 11 August 1905) was an Australian cricketer. He played one first-class match for Tasmania in 1872.

== See also ==
- List of Tasmanian representative cricketers
