= Eric Dwyer =

Australian cricketer

Personal information
- Born: 15 June 1917; St Helens, Tasmania, Australia
- Died: 15 May 1997 (aged 79); Canberra, Australia

Domestic team information
- Years: Team
- 1937-1938: Tasmania
- Source: Cricinfo, 7 March 2016

Eric Dwyer (15 June 1917 – 15 May 1997) was an Australian cricketer. He played one first-class match for Tasmania in 1937/38.

== See also ==
- List of Tasmanian representative cricketers
