= John Bingham (cricketer) =

Australian cricketer

Personal information
- Born: 15 July 1864; Forcett, Tasmania, Australia
- Died: 23 July 1946 (aged 82); Hobart, Tasmania, Australia

Domestic team information
- Years: Team
- 1892-1901: Tasmania
- Source: Cricinfo, 16 January 2016

John Bingham (15 July 1864 – 23 July 1946) was an Australian cricketer. He played six first-class matches for Tasmania between 1892 and 1901.

== See also ==
- List of Tasmanian representative cricketers
