= Alfred Watson (cricketer) =

Australian cricketer

Personal information
- Full name: Alfred Edward Watson
- Born: 31 August 1888; Carlton, Melbourne, Australia
- Died: 6 May 1957 (aged 68); South Melbourne, Australia
- Batting: Right-handed
- Bowling: Right-arm medium-pace, right-arm off-spin
- Role: All-rounder

Domestic team information
- Years: Team
- 1925–1928: Tasmania

Career statistics
Competition	First-class
Matches	4
Runs scored	130
Batting average	16.25
100s/50s	0/0
Top score	47
Balls bowled	677
Wickets	8
Bowling average	38.37
5 wickets in innings	0
10 wickets in match	0
Best bowling	4/95
Catches/stumpings	2/–
- Source: Cricinfo, 4 December 2022

Alfred Edward Watson (31 August 1888 – 6 May 1957) was an Australian cricketer. He played four first-class matches for Tasmania between 1926 and 1928.

Watson moved from Victoria to Tasmania in 1924. He made his first-class debut in March 1926 at the age of 37, when he represented Tasmania against the Australian team that was on its way to England. The Australian XI won by an innings and 184 runs, but Watson took four wickets.

Watson married Florence Hillard in Melbourne in March 1913. They had five sons. She died in Melbourne in August 1955. He died in Melbourne in May 1957.

== See also ==
- List of Tasmanian representative cricketers
