= Sydney Putman =

Australian cricketer

Personal information
- Born: 25 March 1912; Hobart, Tasmania, Australia
- Died: 20 September 1947 (aged 35); Hobart, Tasmania, Australia

Domestic team information
- Years: Team
- 1930-1939: Tasmania
- Source: Cricinfo, 6 March 2016

Sydney Putman (25 March 1912 – 20 September 1947) was an Australian cricketer. He played 21 first-class matches for Tasmania between 1930 and 1939.

== See also ==
- List of Tasmanian representative cricketers
