= Graeme Miller (cricketer) =

Australian cricketer

Personal information
- Born: 24 September 1940; Launceston, Tasmania, Australia
- Died: 30 May 2008 (aged 67); Launceston, Tasmania, Australia

Domestic team information
- Years: Team
- 1970-1971: Tasmania
- Source: Cricinfo, 13 March 2016

Graeme Miller (24 September 1940 – 30 May 2008) was an Australian cricketer. He played one first-class match for Tasmania in 1970/71.

== See also ==
- List of Tasmanian representative cricketers
