= Kenneth Thomson (cricketer) =

Australian cricketer (born 1947)

Personal information
- Born: 5 January 1947 (age 79); Hobart, Tasmania, Australia

Domestic team information
- Years: Team
- 1973-1974: Tasmania
- Source: Cricinfo, 13 March 2016

Kenneth Thomson (born 5 January 1947) is an Australian former cricketer. He played one first-class match for Tasmania in 1973/74.

== See also ==
- List of Tasmanian representative cricketers
