= James Jakins =

Australian cricketer

Personal information
- Born: 1 October 1886; Melbourne, Australia
- Died: 12 December 1948 (aged 62); Wivenhoe, Tasmania, Australia

Domestic team information
- Years: Team
- 1913/14: Tasmania
- Source: Cricinfo, 24 January 2016

James Jakins (1 October 1886 – 12 December 1948) was an Australian cricketer. He played one first-class match for Tasmania in 1913/14.

== See also ==
- List of Tasmanian representative cricketers
