= Jack Shelton (cricketer) =

Australian cricketer (1924–2006)

Personal information
- Full name: Herbert John Shelton
- Born: 21 January 1924; Launceston, Tasmania, Australia
- Died: 1 June 2006 (aged 82); Launceston, Tasmania, Australia

Domestic team information
- Years: Team
- 1951-1957: Tasmania
- Source: Cricinfo, 9 March 2016

Herbert John "Jack" Shelton (21 January 1924 – 1 June 2006) was an Australian cricketer. He played three first-class matches for Tasmania between 1951 and 1957.

== Military service ==
He served in the Army, as Private, in the Army Ordnance Workshops (9 March 1942 – 12 June 1942); and, at 18 years, 5 months, upon transfer to the Royal Australian Air Force, as a Warrant Officer, Royal Australian Air Force (19 June 1942 – 26 October 1945).

== Cricket ==
He played for Tasmania against the M.C.C. touring team in Hobart on 13 January 1951, and a week later, in Launceston, on 19 January 1951. He also played for Tasmania, against Victoria, at St Kilda Cricket Ground, on 22 January 1957.

== See also ==
- List of Tasmanian representative cricketers
