= Alfred Wilkes (cricketer) =

Australian cricketer

Personal information
- Born: 15 November 1922; Launceston, Tasmania, Australia
- Died: 27 August 1998 (aged 75); Evandale, Tasmania, Australia

Domestic team information
- Years: Team
- 1945-1949: Tasmania
- Source: Cricinfo, 7 March 2016

Alfred Wilkes (15 November 1922 – 27 August 1998) was an Australian cricketer. He played eight first-class matches for Tasmania between 1945 and 1949. He also played for North Launceston.

== See also ==
- List of Tasmanian representative cricketers
