= George Marshall (Tasmania cricketer) =

Australian cricketer

Personal information
- Born: 12 September 1832; Sorell, Van Diemen's Land
- Died: 13 July 1905 (aged 72); Sorell, Tasmania, Australia

Domestic team information
- Years: Team
- 1858: Tasmania
- Source: Cricinfo, 6 January 2016

George Marshall (12 September 1832 – 13 July 1905) was an Australian cricketer. He played one first-class match for Tasmania in 1858.

== See also ==
- List of Tasmanian representative cricketers
