= Tim Bower =

Australian cricketer

Personal information
- Full name: Timothy Donald Bower
- Born: 10 September 1968 (age 58); Devonport, Tasmania, Australia
- Batting: Right-handed
- Bowling: Right-arm fast-medium

Domestic team information
- Years: Team
- 1987/88–1993/94: Tasmania

Career statistics
Competition	FC	LA
Matches	15	2
Runs scored	74	–
Batting average	6.16	–
100s/50s	–/–	–/–
Top score	16*	–
Balls bowled	2,478	108
Wickets	27	2
Bowling average	49.03	35.00
5 wickets in innings	–	–
10 wickets in match	–	–
Best bowling	3/37	2/34
Catches/stumpings	1/–	–/–
- Source: Cricinfo, 4 January 2011

Timothy Donald Bower (born 10 September 1968) was an Australian cricketer who played for Tasmania.

== See also ==
- List of Tasmanian representative cricketers
