= Geoffrey Goodwin (cricketer) =

Australian cricketer

Personal information
- Born: 12 February 1923; Hobart, Tasmania, Australia
- Died: 20 September 1981 (aged 58); Melbourne, Australia

Domestic team information
- Years: Team
- 1951-1952: Tasmania
- Source: Cricinfo, 9 March 2016

Geoffrey Goodwin (12 February 1923 – 20 September 1981) was an Australian cricketer. He played two first-class matches for Tasmania in 1951/52.

== See also ==
- List of Tasmanian representative cricketers
