= Donald Broughton =

Australian cricketer

Personal information
- Born: 4 February 1931; Hobart, Tasmania, Australia
- Died: 11 December 1987 (aged 56); Hobart, Tasmania, Australia

Domestic team information
- Years: Team
- 1952-1953: Tasmania
- Source: Cricinfo, 10 March 2016

Donald Broughton (4 February 1931 – 11 December 1987) was an Australian cricketer. He played one first-class match for Tasmania in 1952/53.

== See also ==
- List of Tasmanian representative cricketers
