= John Brain =

Australian cricketer

Personal information
- Born: 9 February 1905; Hobart, Tasmania, Australia
- Died: 21 June 1961 (aged 56); Hobart, Tasmania, Australia

Domestic team information
- Years: Team
- 1930-1931: Tasmania
- Source: Cricinfo, 4 March 2016

John Brain (9 February 1905 – 21 June 1961) was an Australian cricketer. He played two first-class matches for Tasmania between 1930 and 1931.

== See also ==
- List of Tasmanian representative cricketers
