= Richard Cox (Australian cricketer) =

Australian cricketer

Richard Cox (21 April 1830 – 27 March 1865) was an Australian cricketer who played for Tasmania. He was born in Hobart and died in Fingal.

Cox made a single first-class appearance for the side, during the 1853–54 season, against Victoria. In the only innings in which he batted, he scored 34 runs.

== See also ==
- List of Tasmanian representative cricketers
