= Ernest Free =

Australian cricketer

Personal information
- Born: 17 September 1867; Rokeby, Tasmania, Australia
- Died: 5 July 1946 (aged 78); Hobart, Tasmania, Australia

Domestic team information
- Years: Team
- 1909/10: Tasmania
- Source: Cricinfo, 19 January 2016

Ernest Peardon Free (17 September 1867 — 5 July 1946) was an Australian cricketer. He was a right-handed batsman and wicketkeeper who played for Tasmania. He was born in Rokeby and died in Hobart.

Free made a single first-class appearance for the team, during the 1909-10 season, against New South Wales. From the lower order, he scored 12 runs in the first innings, and 11 runs in the second. He held four catches in the match and made one stumping. He played a number of minor-grade representative matches for a Tasmania Country XI, and also for the South against the North in the famous long-running intrastate series.

Free was a blacksmith in the Rokeby district for much of his adult life.

== See also ==
- List of Tasmanian representative cricketers
