= Graeme Farrell (Tasmania cricketer) =

Australian cricketer (born 1947)

Personal information
- Born: 2 November 1947 (age 79); Launceston, Tasmania, Australia

Domestic team information
- Years: Team
- 1965-1970: Tasmania
- Source: Cricinfo, 13 March 2016

Graeme Farrell (born 2 November 1947) is an Australian former cricketer. Farrel played in seven first-class matches for Tasmania for five years; between 1965 and 1970.

== See also ==
- List of Tasmanian representative cricketers
