= Graeme Hudson =

Australian cricketer

Personal information
- Born: 16 June 1930; Wynyard, Tasmania, Australia
- Died: 23 September 1974 (aged 44); Launceston, Tasmania, Australia

Domestic team information
- Years: Team
- 1959-1962: Tasmania
- Source: Cricinfo, 11 March 2016

Graeme Hudson (16 June 1930 – 23 September 1974) was an Australian cricketer. He played ten first-class matches for Tasmania between 1959 and 1962.

== See also ==
- List of Tasmanian representative cricketers
