= Henry Barrett (cricketer) =

Australian cricketer

Personal information
- Born: 19 August 1837; Launceston, Van Diemen's Land
- Died: 10 September 1910 (aged 73); Westbury, Tasmania, Australia

Domestic team information
- Years: Team
- 1870: Tasmania
- Source: Cricinfo, 12 January 2016

Henry Barrett (19 August 1837 – 10 September 1910) was an Australian cricketer. He played one first-class match for Tasmania in 1870.

== See also ==
- List of Tasmanian representative cricketers
