= John Hudson (cricketer) =

Australian cricketer

Personal information
- Born: 23 July 1882; Launceston, Tasmania, Australia
- Died: 16 March 1961 (aged 78); Hobart, Tasmania, Australia

Domestic team information
- Years: Team
- 1906-1912: Tasmania
- Source: Cricinfo, 18 January 2016

John Hudson (23 July 1882 – 16 March 1961) was an Australian cricketer. He played six first-class matches for Tasmania between 1906 and 1912.

== See also ==
- List of Tasmanian representative cricketers
