= Reginald Richardson =

Australian cricketer

Personal information
- Born: 16 October 1922; Hobart, Tasmania, Australia
- Died: 2 July 2003 (aged 80); Hobart, Tasmania, Australia

Domestic team information
- Years: Team
- 1948-1952: Tasmania
- Source: Cricinfo, 8 March 2016

Reginald Richardson (6 October 1922 – 2 July 2003) was an Australian cricketer. He played four first-class matches for Tasmania between 1948 and 1952.

== See also ==
- List of Tasmanian representative cricketers
