= Kerry Flint =

Australian cricketer (born 1946)

Personal information
- Born: 17 September 1946 (age 80); Smithton, Tasmania, Australia

Domestic team information
- Years: Team
- 1965-1966: Tasmania
- Source: Cricinfo, 13 March 2016

Kerry Flint (born 17 September 1946) is an Australian former cricketer. He played one first-class match for Tasmania in 1965/66.

== See also ==
- List of Tasmanian representative cricketers
