= Douglas Wardlaw =

Australian cricketer

Personal information
- Born: 19 July 1904; Hobart, Tasmania, Australia
- Died: 20 May 1968 (aged 63); St Marys, Tasmania, Australia

Domestic team information
- Years: Team
- 1925-1929: Tasmania
- Source: Cricinfo, 1 March 2016

Douglas Wardlaw (19 July 1904 – 20 May 1968) was an Australian cricketer. He played seven first-class matches for Tasmania between 1925 and 1929.

== See also ==
- List of Tasmanian representative cricketers
