= Norman Vincent =

Australian cricketer

Personal information
- Born: 10 November 1883; Sunderland, England
- Died: 12 February 1958 (aged 74); Melbourne, Australia

Domestic team information
- Years: Team
- 1911-1912: Tasmania
- Source: Cricinfo, 20 January 2016

Norman Vincent (10 November 1883 – 12 February 1958) was an Australian cricketer. He played two first-class matches for Tasmania between 1911 and 1912.

== See also ==
- List of Tasmanian representative cricketers
