= Peter Warren (cricketer) =

Australian cricketer (born 1953)

Peter Charles Warren
Personal information
- Born: 13 May 1953 (age 73); Launceston, Tasmania, Australia

Domestic team information
- Years: Team
- 1974-1977: Tasmania
- Source: Cricinfo, 14 March 2016

Peter Warren (born 13 May 1953) is an Australian former cricketer. He played three first-class matches for Tasmania between 1974 and 1977.

== See also ==
- List of Tasmanian representative cricketers
