= Leon Braslin =

Australian cricketer (born 1938)

Personal information
- Born: 12 May 1938 (age 88); New Norfolk, Tasmania, Australia

Domestic team information
- Years: Team
- 1961-1962: Tasmania
- Source: Cricinfo, 13 March 2016

Leon Braslin (born 12 May 1938) is an Australian former cricketer. He played one first-class match for Tasmania in 1961/62.

== See also ==
- List of Tasmanian representative cricketers
