= Phillip Shawe =

Australian cricketer

Personal information
- Full name: Phillip Henry Villiers Washington Shawe
- Born: September 1889; Bangalore, India
- Died: 24 September 1945 (aged 55–56); Melbourne, Australia

Domestic team information
- Years: Team
- 1913-1915: Tasmania
- Source: Cricinfo, 24 January 2016

Phillip Shawe (September 1889 – 24 September 1945) was an Australian cricketer. He played two first-class matches for Tasmania between 1913 and 1915.

== See also ==
- List of Tasmanian representative cricketers
