= Thomas Patterson (cricketer) =

Australian cricketer

Personal information
- Born: 16 September 1839; Hobart, Van Diemen's Land

Domestic team information
- Years: Team
- 1858: Tasmania
- Source: Cricinfo, 6 January 2016

Thomas Patterson (born 16 September 1839, date of death unknown) was an Australian cricketer. He played one first-class match for Tasmania in 1858.

== See also ==
- List of Tasmanian representative cricketers
