= Lyndon Menegon =

Australian cricketer (born 1948)

Personal information
- Born: 11 February 1948 (age 78); Burnie, Tasmania, Australia

Domestic team information
- Years: Team
- 1967-1971: Tasmania
- Source: Cricinfo, 13 March 2016

Lyndon Menegon (born 11 February 1948) is an Australian former cricketer. He played two first-class matches for Tasmania between 1967 and 1971.

== See also ==
- List of Tasmanian representative cricketers
