= Harry Henri =

Australian cricketer

Personal information
- Born: 27 July 1865; Tauranga, New Zealand
- Died: 5 February 1947 (aged 81); Lindisfarne, Tasmania, Australia

Domestic team information
- Years: Team
- 1907: Tasmania
- Source: Cricinfo, 18 January 2016

Harry Henri (27 July 1865 – 5 February 1947) was an Australian cricketer. He played one first-class match for Tasmania in 1907.

== See also ==
- List of Tasmanian representative cricketers
