= Philip Dulling =

Australian cricketer

Personal information
- Born: 5 May 1909; Launceston, Tasmania, Australia
- Died: 1 September 1974 (aged 65); Launceston, Tasmania, Australia

Domestic team information
- Years: Team
- 1934-1935: Tasmania
- Source: Cricinfo, 6 March 2016

Philip Dulling (5 May 1909 – 1 September 1974) was an Australian cricketer. He played one first-class match for Tasmania in 1934/35.

== See also ==
- List of Tasmanian representative cricketers
