= Richard Sams =

Australian cricketer

Personal information
- Born: 1864; Launceston, Tasmania, Australia
- Died: 5 March 1933 (aged 68–69); Roseville, New South Wales, Australia

Domestic team information
- Years: Team
- 1893-1905: Tasmania
- Source: Cricinfo, 16 January 2016

Richard Sams (1864 – 5 March 1933) was an Australian cricketer. He played two first-class matches for Tasmania between 1893 and 1905.

== See also ==
- List of Tasmanian representative cricketers
