= Keith Schmidt =

Australian cricketer

Personal information
- Born: 19 December 1921; Hobart, Tasmania, Australia
- Died: 4 October 2017 (aged 95); Hobart, Tasmania, Australia

Domestic team information
- Years: Team
- 1949-1961: Tasmania
- Source: Cricinfo, 9 March 2016

Keith Schmidt (19 December 1921 – 4 October 2017) was an Australian cricketer. He played sixteen first-class matches for Tasmania between 1949 and 1961.

== See also ==
- List of Tasmanian representative cricketers
