= Sydney Frost =

Australian cricketer (1881–1952)

Personal information
- Born: 21 January 1881; Launceston, Tasmania, Australia
- Died: 19 December 1952 (aged 71); Melbourne, Australia

Domestic team information
- Years: Team
- 1910-1911: Tasmania
- Source: Cricinfo, 20 January 2016

Sydney Frost (21 January 1881 – 19 December 1952) was an Australian cricketer. He played two first-class matches for Tasmania between 1910 and 1911.

== See also ==
- List of Tasmanian representative cricketers
