= William Reid (Tasmania cricketer) =

Australian cricketer

Personal information
- Born: 29 October 1882; Launceston, Tasmania, Australia
- Died: 29 December 1950 (aged 68); Melbourne, Australia
- Source: Cricinfo, 21 September 2020

William Reid (29 October 1882 – 29 December 1950) was an Australian cricketer. He played in one first-class match for Tasmania in 1908/09.

== See also ==
- List of Tasmanian representative cricketers
