= Nicholas Courtney (cricketer) =

Australian cricketer

Personal information
- Full name: Nicholas Charles Palliser Courtney
- Born: 18 July 1967 (age 59); Launceston, Tasmania, Australia
- Batting: Right-handed
- Bowling: Right-arm medium

Domestic team information
- Years: Team
- 1987/88–1995/96: Tasmania

Career statistics
Competition	FC	LA
Matches	24	12
Runs scored	990	215
Batting average	24.75	19.54
100s/50s	–/6	–/–
Top score	88	40
Balls bowled	561	60
Wickets	10	4
Bowling average	41.70	15.25
5 wickets in innings	–	–
10 wickets in match	–	–
Best bowling	2/22	4/19
Catches/stumpings	16/–	5/–
- Source: Cricinfo, 3 January 2011

Nicholas Charles Palliser Courtney (born 18 July 1967 in Launceston, Tasmania) was an Australian cricketer who played for Tasmania.

He made his debut against the touring Sri Lankans in the 1987–88 season, and made fairly regular appearances for the Tigers until the 1994–95 season.

== See also ==
- List of Tasmanian representative cricketers
