= Frederick Chancellor =

Australian cricketer

Personal information
- Born: 27 August 1878; Hobart, Tasmania, Australia
- Died: 16 June 1939 (aged 60); Hobart, Tasmania, Australia

Domestic team information
- Years: Team
- 1902-1912: Tasmania
- Source: Cricinfo, 17 January 2016

Frederick Chancellor (27 August 1878 – 16 June 1939) was an Australian cricketer. He played eleven first-class matches for Tasmania between 1902 and 1912.

Chancellor was well known as a sportsman in Hobart playing for the local Lefroy Football Club and Break o' Day Cricket Club. He played as an all-rounder in cricket bowling medium pace and he played First-class cricket in matches for Tasmania primarily against Victoria and touring English test squads. He also represented Tasmania in Australian Football matches and was voted the best and fairest footballer in southern Tasmania at one time. Later in life Chancellor took up Bowls playing for the Derwent and Royal Hobart bowling clubs and he was selected to represent Tasmania in Bowls in 1934 and was a member of the Royal Hobart Club up until his passing.

In his professional career Chancellor was a member of the Chancellor wine and spirit merchant company. He had never married and had no children. He died in his sleep having previously been in good health.

== See also ==
- List of Tasmanian representative cricketers
