= Alfred Pickett =

Australian cricketer

Personal information
- Born: 1871; Ulverstone, Tasmania, Australia
- Died: 19 March 1953 (aged 81–82); Ulverstone, Tasmania, Australia

Domestic team information
- Years: Team
- 1899-1900: Tasmania
- Source: Cricinfo, 17 January 2016

Alfred Pickett (1871 – 19 March 1953) was an Australian cricketer. He played two first-class matches for Tasmania between 1899 and 1900. He also played for Abbotsham and Leven.

== See also ==
- List of Tasmanian representative cricketers
