= Daniel Cuthbert =

Australian cricketer

Daniel Charles Cuthbert
Personal information
- Born: 2 February 1846; Franklin, Tasmania, Australia
- Died: 6 July 1912 (aged 66); Hobart, Tasmania, Australia

Domestic team information
- Years: Team
- 1868–1878: Tasmania
- Source: Cricinfo, 7 January 2016

Daniel Charles Cuthbert (2 February 1846 – 6 July 1912) was an Australian cricketer. He played two first-class matches for Tasmania between 1868 and 1878. Cuthbert was a law conveyancer in Hobart, and worked for the firm Butler, McIntyre & Butler.

== See also ==
- List of Tasmanian representative cricketers
