= Ken MacDonald (cricketer) =

Australian cricketer

Personal information
- Born: 3 January 1934; Premaydena, Tasmania, Australia Married: Leita Meers 1958 Children: Peter and Judith
- Died: 1 July 1999 (aged 65); Hobart, Tasmania, Australia

Domestic team information
- Years: Team
- 1955-1956: Tasmania
- Source: Cricinfo, 11 March 2016

Ken MacDonald (3 January 1934 – 1 July 1999) was an Australian cricketer. He played two first-class matches for Tasmania between 1955 and 1956.

== See also ==
- List of Tasmanian representative cricketers
