= Joseph Ware (cricketer) =

English cricketer

Joseph Maitland Ware (8 September 1822 – 21 September 1868) was an English cricketer who played for Tasmania. He was born in London and died in Lausanne.

Ware made a single first-class appearance for the side, during the 1853–54 season, against Victoria. From the upper-middle order, he scored 9 runs in the first innings in which he batted, and 1 not out in the second.

== See also ==
- List of Tasmanian representative cricketers
