= Graeme Mansfield =

Australian cricketer (born 1942)

Personal information
- Born: 27 December 1942 (age 83); Hobart, Tasmania, Australia

Domestic team information
- Years: Team
- 1974-1977: Tasmania
- Source: Cricinfo, 14 March 2016

Graeme Mansfield (born 27 December 1942) is an Australian former cricketer. He played three first-class matches for Tasmania between 1974 and 1977.

== See also ==
- List of Tasmanian representative cricketers
