= Neil Davis (cricketer) =

Australian cricketer

Personal information
- Born: 1 August 1900; Launceston, Tasmania, Australia
- Died: 25 April 1974 (aged 73); Evans Head, New South Wales, Australia

Domestic team information
- Years: Team
- 1923-1936: Tasmania
- Source: Cricinfo, 24 January 2016

Neil Davis (1 August 1900 – 25 April 1974) was an Australian cricketer. He played eleven first-class matches for Tasmania between 1923 and 1936.

== See also ==
- List of Tasmanian representative cricketers
