= Charles Martin (Tasmania cricketer) =

Australian cricketer

Charles William Beresford Martin
Personal information
- Born: 6 October 1888; Launceston, Tasmania, Australia
- Died: 30 October 1951 (aged 63); Melbourne, Australia

Domestic team information
- Years: Team
- 1907-1929: Tasmania
- Source: Cricinfo, 18 January 2016

Charles William Beresford Martin (6 October 1888 – 30 October 1951) was an Australian cricketer. He played 21 first-class matches for Tasmania between 1907 and 1929.

== See also ==
- List of Tasmanian representative cricketers
