= Stuart Taylor (cricketer) =

Australian cricketer

Personal information
- Born: 13 April 1900; Melbourne, Australia
- Died: 2 February 1978 (aged 77); Perth, Australia

Domestic team information
- Years: Team
- 1930-1931: Tasmania
- Source: Cricinfo, 4 March 2016

Stuart Taylor (13 April 1900 – 2 February 1978) was an Australian cricketer. He played two first-class matches for Tasmania between 1930 and 1931.

== See also ==
- List of Tasmanian representative cricketers
