= David McGuire (cricketer) =

Australian cricketer (1931–2007)

Personal information
- Born: 13 November 1931; Hobart, Tasmania, Australia
- Died: 26 February 2007 (aged 75); Hobart, Tasmania, Australia

Domestic team information
- Years: Team
- 1956-1959: Tasmania
- Source: Cricinfo, 11 March 2016

David McGuire (13 November 1931 – 26 February 2007) was an Australian cricketer. He played three first-class matches for Tasmania between 1956 and 1959.

== See also ==
- List of Tasmanian representative cricketers
