= Thomas Freeman (Australian cricketer) =

Australian cricketer

Personal information
- Born: 13 June 1894; Hobart, Tasmania, Australia
- Died: 19 June 1965 (aged 71); Melbourne, Australia

Domestic team information
- Years: Team
- 1913/14: Tasmania
- Source: Cricinfo, 23 January 2016

Thomas Freeman (13 June 1894 – 19 June 1965) was an Australian cricketer. He played one first-class match for Tasmania in 1913/14.

== See also ==
- List of Tasmanian representative cricketers
