= Frederick Hanson (cricketer) =

Australian cricketer

Personal information
- Born: 7 April 1872; Hobart, Tasmania, Australia
- Died: 24 September 1917 (aged 45); Hobart, Tasmania, Australia

Domestic team information
- Years: Team
- 1906-1908: Tasmania
- Source: Cricinfo, 18 January 2016

Frederick Hanson (7 April 1872 – 24 September 1917) was an Australian cricketer. He played two first-class matches for Tasmania between 1906 and 1908.

== See also ==
- List of Tasmanian representative cricketers
