= Henry Lovett =

Australian cricketer

Personal information
- Born: 3 March 1856; Hobart, Colony of Tasmania
- Died: 20 May 1937 (aged 81); Hobart, Tasmania, Australia

Domestic team information
- Years: Team
- 1877: Tasmania
- Source: Cricinfo, 13 January 2016

Henry Lovett (3 March 1856 – 20 May 1937) was an Australian cricketer. He played one first-class match for Tasmania in 1877.

== See also ==
- List of Tasmanian representative cricketers
