= Francis Campbell (cricketer) =

Australian cricketer

Personal information
- Born: 20 April 1867; Hobart, Tasmania, Australia
- Died: 14 May 1929 (aged 62); Gladesville, New South Wales, Australia

Domestic team information
- Years: Team
- 1894: Tasmania
- Source: Cricinfo, 16 January 2016

Francis Campbell (20 April 1867 – 14 May 1929) was an Australian cricketer. He played one first-class match for Tasmania in 1894.

== See also ==
- List of Tasmanian representative cricketers
