= Frederick Richardson (Australian cricketer) =

Australian cricketer

Personal information
- Born: 29 March 1878; Campbell Town, Tasmania, Australia
- Died: 7 March 1955 (aged 76); Campbell Town, Tasmania, Australia

Domestic team information
- Years: Team
- 1902: Tasmania
- Source: Cricinfo, 17 January 2016

Frederick Richardson (29 March 1878 – 7 March 1955) was an Australian cricketer. He played one first-class match for Tasmania in 1902.

In that match, he scored 22 runs. He bowled a single over, from which six runs were scored.

== See also ==
- List of Tasmanian representative cricketers
