= Richard Barnes (cricketer) =

Australian cricketer

Personal information
- Born: c. 1849; Ireland
- Died: 30 April 1902; Melbourne, Victoria

Domestic team information
- Years: Team
- 1870-1873: Tasmania
- Source: Cricketarchive, 20 January 2016

Richard Barnes (c. 1849 - 30 April 1902) was an Australian cricketer. He played two first-class matches between 1870 and 1873, one for Tasmania and one for the Rest of Australia XI.

== See also ==
- List of Tasmanian representative cricketers
