= James Burn =

Australian cricketer

Personal information
- Born: 31 July 1849; Hobart, Tasmania, Australia

Domestic team information
- Years: Team
- 1868: Tasmania
- Source: Cricinfo, 7 January 2016

James Burn (born 31 July 1849, date of death unknown) was an Australian cricketer. He played one first-class match for Tasmania in 1868.

== See also ==
- List of Tasmanian representative cricketers
