= Gordon Lethborg =

Australian cricketer

Personal information
- Full name: Gordon John Lethborg
- Born: 23 November 1907; Scottsdale, Tasmania, Australia
- Died: 31 August 1989 (aged 81); Launceston, Tasmania, Australia

Domestic team information
- Years: Team
- 1929-1933: Tasmania
- Source: Cricinfo, 4 March 2016

Gordon Lethborg (23 November 1907 – 31 August 1989) was an Australian cricketer. He played four first-class matches for Tasmania between 1929 and 1933.

== See also ==
- List of Tasmanian representative cricketers
