= Ronald Powell (Australian cricketer) =

Australian cricketer

Personal information
- Born: 27 September 1883; New Norfolk, Tasmania, Australia
- Died: 22 August 1922 (aged 38); Queensland, Australia

Domestic team information
- Years: Team
- 1914/15: Tasmania
- Source: Cricinfo, 24 January 2016

Ronald Powell (27 September 1883 – 22 August 1922) was an Australian cricketer. He played one first-class match for Tasmania in 1914/15.

== See also ==
- List of Tasmanian representative cricketers
