= Thomas Matthews (Australian cricketer) =

Australian cricketer

Personal information
- Born: 9 February 1905; Longley, Tasmania, Australia
- Died: 11 May 1990 (aged 85); Longley, Tasmania, Australia

Domestic team information
- Years: Team
- 1930-1931: Tasmania
- Source: Cricinfo, 6 March 2016

Thomas Matthews (9 February 1905 – 11 May 1990) was an Australian cricketer. He played three first-class matches for Tasmania between 1930 and 1931.

== See also ==
- List of Tasmanian representative cricketers
