= Frederick Toby =

Australian cricketer

Personal information
- Born: 9 December 1888; Sydney, Australia
- Died: 1963 (aged 74–75)

Domestic team information
- Years: Team
- 1921/22: Tasmania
- Source: Cricinfo, 24 January 2016

Frederick Toby (9 December 1888 – 1963) was an Australian cricketer. He played one first-class match for Tasmania in 1921/22.

== See also ==
- List of Tasmanian representative cricketers
