= Frederick Haymes =

Australian cricketer

Personal information
- Born: 5 April 1849; Launceston, Van Diemen's Land
- Died: 12 March 1928 (aged 78); Lakes Entrance, Victoria, Australia

Domestic team information
- Years: Team
- 1870-1873: Tasmania
- Source: Cricinfo, 12 January 2016

Frederick Haymes (5 April 1849 – 12 March 1928) was an Australian cricketer. He played two first-class matches for Tasmania between 1870 and 1873.

== See also ==
- List of Tasmanian representative cricketers
