= Frank Davis (cricketer) =

Australian cricketer

Personal information
- Born: 29 May 1904; Launceston, Tasmania, Australia
- Died: 12 September 1973 (aged 69); Launceston, Tasmania, Australia

Domestic team information
- Years: Team
- 1933-1934: Tasmania
- Source: Cricinfo, 6 March 2016

Frank Davis (29 May 1904 – 12 September 1973) was an Australian cricketer. He played two first-class matches for Tasmania between 1933 and 1934.

== See also ==
- List of Tasmanian representative cricketers
