= James Meech =

Australian cricketer

Personal information
- Born: 16 December 1884; Hobart, Tasmania, Australia
- Died: 31 October 1955 (aged 70); Hobart, Tasmania, Australia

Domestic team information
- Years: Team
- 1906-1910: Tasmania
- Source: Cricinfo, 18 January 2016

James Meech (16 December 1884 – 31 October 1955) was an Australian cricketer. He played two first-class matches for Tasmania between 1906 and 1910.

== See also ==
- List of Tasmanian representative cricketers
