= Donald Ellis =

Australian cricketer

Personal information
- Born: 5 October 1917; Launceston, Tasmania, Australia
- Died: 4 September 2001 (aged 83); Launceston, Tasmania, Australia

Domestic team information
- Years: Team
- 1945-1946: Tasmania
- Source: Cricinfo, 7 March 2016

Donald Ellis (5 October 1917 – 4 September 2001) was an Australian cricketer. He played one first-class match for Tasmania in 1945/46.

== See also ==
- List of Tasmanian representative cricketers
