= Robert Bayles =

Australian cricketer

Personal information
- Born: 7 July 1892; Ross, Tasmania, Australia
- Died: 16 May 1959 (aged 66); Launceston, Tasmania, Australia

Domestic team information
- Years: Team
- 1913/14: Tasmania
- Source: Cricinfo, 23 January 2016

Robert Bayles (7 July 1892 – 16 May 1959) was an Australian cricketer. He played one first-class match for Tasmania in 1913/14.

== See also ==
- List of Tasmanian representative cricketers
