= James Tringrove =

Australian cricketer

Personal information
- Born: 25 November 1907; Hobart, Tasmania, Australia
- Died: 11 September 1979 (aged 71); Hobart, Tasmania, Australia

Domestic team information
- Years: Team
- 1932-1939: Tasmania
- Source: Cricinfo, 6 March 2016

James Tringrove (25 November 1907 – 11 September 1979) was an Australian cricketer. He played three first-class matches for Tasmania between 1932 and 1939.

== See also ==
- List of Tasmanian representative cricketers
