= Francis Pictet =

Australian cricketer

Personal information
- Born: 4 June 1866; Bath, Somerset, England

Domestic team information
- Years: Team
- 1897: Tasmania
- Source: Cricinfo, 16 January 2016

Francis Pictet (born 4 June 1866, date of death unknown) was an Australian cricketer. He played one first-class match for Tasmania in 1897.

== See also ==
- List of Tasmanian representative cricketers
