= Glen Waters =

Australian cricketer (born 1943)

Personal information
- Born: 3 May 1943 (age 83); Launceston, Tasmania, Australia

Domestic team information
- Years: Team
- 1961-1962: Tasmania
- Source: Cricinfo, 13 March 2016

Glen Waters (born 3 May 1943) is an Australian former cricketer. He played three first-class matches for Tasmania between 1961 and 1962.

== See also ==
- List of Tasmanian representative cricketers
