= Basil Reid =

Australian cricketer

Personal information
- Full name: Basil Stanley Reid
- Born: 17 May 1924; Launceston, Tasmania, Australia
- Died: 16 July 2000 (aged 76); Launceston, Tasmania, Australia
- Batting: Right-handed
- Role: Batsman

Domestic team information
- Years: Team
- 1949-1953: Tasmania

Career statistics
Competition	FC
Matches	6
Runs scored	203
Batting average	16.91
100s/50s	0/0
Top score	49
Catches/stumpings	2/0
- Source: Cricinfo, 8 March 2016

Basil Reid (17 May 1924 – 16 July 2000) was an Australian cricketer. He played six first-class matches for Tasmania between 1949 and 1953.

== See also ==
- List of Tasmanian representative cricketers
