= George Briant =

Australian cricketer

Personal information
- Born: 1828; Hackney, London, England
- Died: 10 May 1914 (aged 85–86); Hobart, Tasmania, Australia

Domestic team information
- Years: Team
- 1858: Tasmania
- Source: Cricinfo, 6 January 2016

George Briant (1828 – 10 May 1914) was an Australian cricketer. He played one first-class match for Tasmania in 1858.

== See also ==
- List of Tasmanian representative cricketers
