= William Forster (cricketer) =

Australian cricketer (1884–1930)

Personal information
- Born: 1 March 1884; Gateshead, England
- Died: 7 February 1930 (aged 45); Melbourne, Australia

Domestic team information
- Years: Team
- 1907-08: Tasmania
- Source: Cricinfo, 18 January 2016

William Forster (1 March 1884 – 7 February 1930) was an Australian cricketer. He played one first-class match for Tasmania in 1907–08.

== See also ==
- List of Tasmanian representative cricketers
