= Walter Jamieson =

Australian cricketer

Personal information
- Born: 21 July 1828; Plenty, Tasmania, Australia
- Died: 28 December 1881 (aged 53); Plenty, Tasmania, Australia

Domestic team information
- Years: Team
- 1858: Tasmania
- Source: Cricinfo, 6 January 2016

Walter Jamieson (21 July 1828 – 28 December 1881) was an Australian cricketer. He played two first-class matches for Tasmania in 1858.

== See also ==
- List of Tasmanian representative cricketers
