= Reginald Broomby =

Australian cricketer

Personal information
- Born: 6 January 1905; Launceston, Tasmania, Australia
- Died: 10 May 1984 (aged 79); Southport, Queensland, Australia

Domestic team information
- Years: Team
- 1932–1933: Tasmania
- Source: ESPNcricinfo, 6 March 2016

Reginald Broomby (6 January 1905 – 10 May 1984) was an Australian cricketer. He played two first-class matches for Tasmania between 1932 and 1933.

== See also ==
- List of Tasmanian representative cricketers
