= Gregory Tilyard =

Australian cricketer (born 1932)

Personal information
- Born: 19 March 1932 (age 94); Sandford, Tasmania, Australia

Domestic team information
- Years: Team
- 1960-1961: Tasmania
- Source: Cricinfo, 12 March 2016

Gregory Almeria Sydney Tilyard (born 19 March 1932) is an Australian former cricketer. He played one first-class match for Tasmania in 1960/61.

== See also ==
- List of Tasmanian representative cricketers
