= James Ferguson (cricketer) =

Australian cricketer

Personal information
- Born: 19 February 1848; Launceston, Tasmania, Australia
- Died: 10 May 1913 (aged 65); Brisbane, Australia

Domestic team information
- Years: Team
- 1870-1878: Tasmania
- Source: Cricinfo, 12 January 2016

James Ferguson (19 February 1848 – 10 May 1913) was an Australian cricketer. He played two first-class matches for Tasmania between 1870 and 1878.

== See also ==
- List of Tasmanian representative cricketers
