= Ian Crowden =

Australian cricketer (1933–2023)

Personal information
- Full name: Ian Bruce Crowden
- Born: 22 February 1933; Deloraine, Tasmania, Australia
- Died: 30 April 2023 (aged 90); Hobart, Tasmania, Australia
- Batting: Right-handed
- Bowling: Right-arm off-spin

Domestic team information
- Years: Team
- 1960–1961: Tasmania
- 1963–1964: Tasmania

Career statistics
Competition	First-class
Matches	8
Runs scored	232
Batting average	15.46
100s/50s	0/1
Top score	52
Balls bowled	612
Wickets	16
Bowling average	30.81
5 wickets in innings	2
10 wickets in match	0
Best bowling	5/49
Catches/stumpings	3/–
- Source: Cricinfo, 26 August 2017

Ian Bruce Crowden (22 February 1933 – 30 April 2023) was an Australian cricketer. He played eight first-class matches for Tasmania between 1961 and 1963.

His best batting and bowling performances came in the same match, against South Australia in Adelaide in 1962–63, when he took 5 for 49 in South Australia's only innings and made 52, the top score in Tasmania's second innings.

Crowden died in Hobart, Tasmania on 30 April 2023, at the age of 90.

== See also ==
- List of Tasmanian representative cricketers
