= Donald Clark (cricketer) =

Australian cricketer

Personal information
- Born: 19 January 1914; Hobart, Tasmania, Australia
- Died: 16 August 1994 (aged 80); Hobart, Tasmania, Australia

Domestic team information
- Years: Team
- 1946-1947: Tasmania
- Source: Cricinfo, 7 March 2016

Donald Clark (19 January 1914 – 16 August 1994) was an Australian cricketer. He played three first-class matches for Tasmania between 1946 and 1947.

== See also ==
- List of Tasmanian representative cricketers
