= Peter Mancell =

Australian cricketer (born 1958)

Personal information
- Born: 15 March 1958 (age 68); Goulburn, New South Wales, Australia

Domestic team information
- Years: Team
- 1981-1983: Tasmania
- Source: Cricinfo, 15 March 2016

Peter Mancell (born 15 March 1958) is an Australian former cricketer. He played thirteen first-class matches for Tasmania between 1981 and 1983.

== See also ==
- List of Tasmanian representative cricketers
