= Miles Coverdale (cricketer) =

Australian cricketer

Personal information
- Born: 3 August 1846; Richmond, Tasmania, Australia
- Died: 3 April 1898 (aged 51); Hobart, Tasmania, Australia

Domestic team information
- Years: Team
- 1870: Tasmania
- Source: Cricinfo, 12 January 2016

Miles Coverdale (4 August 1846 – 3 April 1898) was an Australian cricketer. He played one first-class match for Tasmania in 1870.

== See also ==
- List of Tasmanian representative cricketers
