= Robert Panitzki =

Australian cricketer (born 1948)

Personal information
- Born: 29 April 1948 (age 78); Hobart, Tasmania, Australia

Domestic team information
- Years: Team
- 1973-1976: Tasmania
- Source: Cricinfo, 13 March 2016

Robert Panitzki (born 29 April 1948) is an Australian former cricketer. He played four first-class matches for Tasmania between 1973 and 1976.

== See also ==
- List of Tasmanian representative cricketers
