= Gary Knight (cricketer) =

Australian cricketer (born 1950)

Personal information
- Born: 20 July 1950 (age 76); Launceston, Tasmania, Australia

Domestic team information
- Years: Team
- 1972-1973: Tasmania
- Source: Cricinfo, 13 March 2016

Gary Knight (born 20 July 1950) is an Australian former cricketer. He played one first-class match for Tasmania in 1972/73.

== See also ==
- List of Tasmanian representative cricketers
