= James Walsh (cricketer) =

Australian cricketer

Personal information
- Full name: James Michael Walsh
- Born: 28 May 1913; Launceston, Tasmania, Australia
- Died: 5 July 1986 (aged 73); Launceston, Tasmania, Australia

Domestic team information
- Years: Team
- 1932-1937: Tasmania
- Source: Cricinfo, 6 March 2016

James Walsh (28 May 1913 – 5 July 1986) was an Australian cricketer. He played fifteen first-class matches for Tasmania between 1932 and 1937.

== See also ==
- List of Tasmanian representative cricketers
