= Philip Henty =

Australian cricketer

Personal information
- Born: 4 February 1883; Berwick, Victoria, Australia
- Died: 21 October 1949 (aged 66); Hobart, Tasmania, Australia

Domestic team information
- Years: Team
- 1922-1929: Tasmania
- Source: Cricinfo, 24 January 2016

Philip Henty (4 February 1883 – 21 October 1949) was an Australian cricketer. He played seven first-class matches for Tasmania between 1922 and 1929.

== See also ==
- List of Tasmanian representative cricketers
