= Thomas Westbrook (cricketer) =

Australian cricketer

Personal information
- Born: 18 September 1832; Hobart, Tasmania, Australia
- Died: 13 September 1911 (aged 78); Hobart, Tasmania, Australia

Domestic team information
- Years: Team
- 1858: Tasmania
- Source: Cricinfo, 6 January 2016

Thomas Westbrook (18 September 1832 – 13 September 1911) was an Australian cricketer. He played two first-class matches for Tasmania in 1858.

== See also ==
- List of Tasmanian representative cricketers
