= Doug Walton (cricketer) =

Australian cricketer

Personal information
- Born: 9 April 1927; New Norfolk, Tasmania, Australia
- Died: 18 February 2001 (aged 73); Hobart, Tasmania, Australia

Domestic team information
- Years: Team
- 1950-1961: Tasmania
- Source: Cricinfo, 9 March 2016

Doug Walton (9 April 1927 – 18 February 2001) was an Australian cricketer. He played nine first-class matches for Tasmania between 1950 and 1961.

== See also ==
- List of Tasmanian representative cricketers
