= Albert Shugg =

Australian cricketer

Personal information
- Born: 5 July 1894; Melbourne, Australia
- Died: 20 July 1941 (aged 47); Hobart, Tasmania, Australia

Domestic team information
- Years: Team
- 1924-1925: Tasmania
- Source: Cricinfo, 1 March 2016

Dr Albert William Shugg CBE, (5 July 1894 – 20 July 1941) was an Australian cricketer. He played two first-class matches for Tasmania between 1924 and 1925.

== See also ==
- List of Tasmanian representative cricketers
