= James Bennison =

Australian cricketer

Personal information
- Born: 16 February 1854; Hobart, Van Diemen's Land
- Died: 14 November 1916 (aged 62); Hobart, Tasmania, Australia

Domestic team information
- Years: Team
- 1877: Tasmania
- Source: Cricinfo, 13 January 2016

James Bennison (16 February 1854 – 14 November 1916) was an Australian cricketer. He played one first-class match for Tasmania in 1877.

== See also ==
- List of Tasmanian representative cricketers
