= Byron Hyland =

Australian cricketer (1930–2023)

Personal information
- Born: 14 January 1930; New Norfolk, Tasmania, Australia
- Died: 10 March 2023 (aged 93)

Domestic team information
- Years: Team
- 1953-1964: Tasmania
- Source: Cricinfo, 10 March 2016

Byron John Hyland (14 January 1930 – 10 March 2023) was an Australian cricketer. He played thirteen first-class matches for Tasmania between 1953 and 1964. Hyland died at home on 10 March 2023, at the age of 93.

== See also ==
- List of Tasmanian representative cricketers
