= Ken Gourlay =

Australian cricketer (1914–1999)

Personal information
- Born: 27 June 1914; Hobart, Tasmania, Australia
- Died: 28 January 1999 (aged 84); Hobart, Tasmania, Australia

Domestic team information
- Years: Team
- 1932-1937: Tasmania
- Source: Cricinfo, 6 March 2016

Ken Gourlay (27 June 1914 – 28 January 1999) was an Australian cricketer. He played three first-class matches for Tasmania between 1932 and 1937.

== See also ==
- List of Tasmanian representative cricketers
