= Lloyd Smith (cricketer) =

Australian cricketer

Personal information
- Born: 5 August 1928; Hobart, Tasmania, Australia
- Died: 26 August 2004 (aged 76); Hobart, Tasmania, Australia

Domestic team information
- Years: Team
- 1950-1959: Tasmania
- Source: Cricinfo, 9 March 2016

Lloyd Smith (5 August 1928 – 26 August 2004) was an Australian cricketer. He played eight first-class matches for Tasmania between 1950 and 1959.

== See also ==
- List of Tasmanian representative cricketers
