= William Birch (Australian cricketer) =

Australian cricketer

William Thomas Birch
Personal information
- Born: 26 October 1849; Hobart, Van Diemen's Land
- Died: 18 August 1897 (aged 47); Hobart, Tasmania, Australia

Domestic team information
- Years: Team
- 1868–1878: Tasmania
- Source: Cricinfo, 7 January 2016

William Thomas Birch (26 October 1849 – 18 August 1897) was an Australian cricketer. He played two first-class matches for Tasmania between 1868 and 1878. Birch had a long association with the Hobart City Council and was Town Clerk at the time of his death.

== See also ==
- List of Tasmanian representative cricketers
