= Richard Wallace (cricketer) =

Australian cricketer (1934–2019)

Personal information
- Born: 22 March 1934; Melbourne, Australia
- Died: 3 July 2019 (aged 85)

Domestic team information
- Years: Team
- 1960-1961: Tasmania
- Source: Cricinfo, 12 March 2016

Richard Wallace (22 March 1934 – 3 July 2019) was an Australian cricketer. He played one first-class match for Tasmania in 1960/61.

== See also ==
- List of Tasmanian representative cricketers
