= Bruce Wardlaw =

Australian cricketer

Personal information
- Full name: Robert Bruce Searl Wardlaw
- Born: 9 January 1914; Hobart, Tasmania, Australia
- Died: 12 September 1986 (aged 72); Launceston, Tasmania, Australia

Domestic team information
- Years: Team
- 1936-1937: Tasmania
- Source: Cricinfo, 6 March 2016

Bruce Wardlaw (9 January 1914 – 12 September 1986) was an Australian sportsman from Tasmania who was chosen at representative level at both cricket and Australian Football.

== Cricket career ==
He played one first-class match for Tasmania in 1936/37.

== Football player ==
Wardlaw played for North Launceston in the NTFA, winning the club Best and Fairest award in 1940, and was chosen a number of times to represent the North in the regular intrastate matches versus the South and North West Union.

== Personal life ==
Bruce Wardlaw served in the Australian Army during World War Two.

== See also ==
- List of Tasmanian representative cricketers
