= Roy Wilkins (cricketer) =

Australian cricketer

Personal information
- Born: 18 April 1892; Hobart, Tasmania, Australia
- Died: 17 July 1965 (aged 73); Hobart, Tasmania, Australia

Domestic team information
- Years: Team
- 1925-1926: Tasmania
- Source: Cricinfo, 1 March 2016

Roy Wilkins (18 April 1892 – 17 July 1965) was an Australian cricketer. He played two first-class matches for Tasmania between 1925 and 1926.

== See also ==
- List of Tasmanian representative cricketers
