= Vernon Driscoll =

Australian cricketer

Personal information
- Born: 11 April 1891; Glebe, Tasmania, Australia
- Died: 19 March 1967 (aged 75); Bellerive, Tasmania, Australia

Domestic team information
- Years: Team
- 1927-1932: Tasmania
- Source: Cricinfo, 1 March 2016

Vernon Driscoll (11 April 1891 – 19 March 1967) was an Australian cricketer. He played four first-class matches for Tasmania between 1927 and 1932.

== See also ==
- List of Tasmanian representative cricketers
