= John Thomas (Australian cricketer) =

Australian cricketer

Personal information
- Born: 12 April 1852; Merthyr Tydfil, Wales
- Died: 29 May 1915 (aged 63); Carlton, Victoria, Australia

Domestic team information
- Years: Team
- 1870: Tasmania
- Source: Cricinfo, 12 January 2016

John Thomas (12 April 1852 – 29 May 1915) was an Australian cricketer. He played one first-class match for Tasmania in 1870.

== See also ==
- List of Tasmanian representative cricketers
