= Keith Kildey =

Australian cricketer

Personal information
- Born: 30 April 1919; Leeton, New South Wales, Australia
- Died: 12 February 2005 (aged 85); Melbourne, Australia

Domestic team information
- Years: Team
- 1946-1947: Tasmania
- Source: Cricinfo, 8 March 2016

Edward Keith Kildey (30 April 1919 – 12 February 2005) was an Australian cricketer. He played one first-class match for Tasmania in 1946/47.

== See also ==
- List of Tasmanian representative cricketers
