= Jack Gardiner (cricketer) =

Australian cricketer

Personal information
- Born: 20 May 1913; Hobart, Tasmania, Australia
- Died: 11 September 1976 (aged 63); Hobart, Tasmania, Australia

Domestic team information
- Years: Team
- 1935-1949: Tasmania
- Source: Cricinfo, 6 March 2016

Jack Gardiner (20 May 1913 – 11 September 1976) was an Australian cricketer. He played fourteen first-class matches for Tasmania between 1935 and 1949.

== See also ==
- List of Tasmanian representative cricketers
