= Kerry Hooper =

Australian cricketer

Personal information
- Born: 9 June 1942; Launceston, Tasmania, Australia
- Died: 16 March 2017 (aged 74)

Domestic team information
- Years: Team
- 1965-1973: Tasmania
- Source: Cricinfo, 13 March 2016

Kerry Hooper (9 June 1942 – 16 March 2017) was an Australian cricketer. He played three first-class matches for Tasmania between 1965 and 1973.

== See also ==
- List of Tasmanian representative cricketers
