= Thomas Elliott (Australian cricketer) =

Australian cricketer

Personal information
- Born: 22 March 1879; Hobart, Tasmania, Australia
- Died: 21 October 1939 (aged 60); Launceston, Tasmania, Australia

Domestic team information
- Years: Team
- 1908-1914: Tasmania
- Source: Cricinfo, 19 January 2016

Thomas Elliott (22 March 1879 – 21 October 1939) was an Australian cricketer. He played three first-class matches for Tasmania between 1908 and 1914.

== See also ==
- List of Tasmanian representative cricketers
