= George Paton (cricketer) =

Australian cricketer

Personal information
- Born: 1 March 1879; Hobart, Tasmania, Australia
- Died: 5 October 1950 (aged 71); Hobart, Tasmania, Australia

Domestic team information
- Years: Team
- 1898-1914: Tasmania
- Source: Cricinfo, 17 January 2016

George Paton (1 March 1879 – 5 October 1950) was an Australian cricketer. He played 21 first-class matches for Tasmania between 1898 and 1914.

== See also ==
- List of Tasmanian representative cricketers
