= Thomas Daly (cricketer) =

Australian cricketer

Personal information
- Born: c. 1847
- Died: 23 September 1887 (aged 39–40); Inveresk, Tasmania, Australia

Domestic team information
- Years: Team
- 1868: Tasmania
- Source: Cricinfo, 7 January 2016

Thomas Daly (c. 1847 – 23 September 1887) was an Australian cricketer. He played one first-class match for Tasmania in 1868.

== See also ==
- List of Tasmanian representative cricketers
