= Eric Morse (cricketer) =

Australian cricketer

Personal information
- Born: 26 August 1918; Sheffield, Tasmania, Australia
- Died: 2 March 2010 (aged 91); Hobart, Tasmania Australia

Domestic team information
- Years: Team
- 1945-1947: Tasmania
- Source: Cricinfo, 7 March 2016

Eric Morse (26 August 1918 – 2 March 2010) was an Australian cricketer. He played three first-class matches for Tasmania between 1945 and 1947.

== See also ==
- List of Tasmanian representative cricketers
