= Kevin Miller (cricketer) =

Australian cricketer

Personal information
- Born: 12 October 1936 (age 90); Launceston, Tasmania, Australia

Domestic team information
- Years: Team
- 1960-1961: Tasmania
- Source: Cricinfo, 13 March 2016

Kevin Miller (born 12 October 1936) is an Australian former cricketer. He played one first-class match for Tasmania in 1960/61.

== See also ==
- List of Tasmanian representative cricketers
