= Harold Allen (cricketer, born 1886) =

Australian cricketer

Personal information
- Born: 13 October 1886; Invercargill, New Zealand
- Died: 9 July 1939 (aged 52); Hobart, Tasmania, Australia

Domestic team information
- Years: Team
- 1912-1924: Tasmania
- Source: Cricinfo, 23 January 2016

Harold Allen (13 October 1886 – 9 July 1939) was an Australian cricketer. He was born in 1886 in Invercargill, New Zealand. He played two first-class matches for Tasmania between 1912 and 1914.

== See also ==
- List of Tasmanian representative cricketers
