= Leslie Phelps =

Australian cricketer

Leslie Roy Phelps (24 January 1893 – 12 September 1972) was an Australian cricketer. He was a left-handed batsman and right-arm medium-fast bowler who played for Tasmania. He was born and died in Sydney.

Phelps made a single first-class appearance for the side, during the 1928–29 season, against New South Wales. From the tailend, he scored a single run in the first innings in which he batted, and a duck in the second, as Tasmania lost the match by an innings margin.

== See also ==
- List of Tasmanian representative cricketers
