= Douglas Thollar =

Australian cricketer

Personal information
- Born: 13 February 1919; George Town, Tasmania, Australia
- Died: 14 June 2005 (aged 86); Sydney, Australia

Domestic team information
- Years: Team
- 1936–1939: Tasmania
- Source: Cricinfo, 6 March 2016

Douglas Thollar (13 February 1919 – 14 June 2005) was an Australian cricketer. He played three first-class matches for Tasmania between 1936 and 1939.

== See also ==
- List of Tasmanian representative cricketers
