= Gregory Blair (cricketer) =

Australian cricketer (born 1947)

Personal information
- Born: 15 December 1947 (age 78); Launceston, Tasmania, Australia

Domestic team information
- Years: Team
- 1967: Tasmania
- 1969: Victoria
- Source: Cricinfo, 5 December 2015

Gregory Blair (born 15 December 1947) is an Australian former cricketer. He played one first-class cricket match for Tasmania in 1967 and one match for Victoria in 1969.

== See also ==
- List of Victoria first-class cricketers
- List of Tasmanian representative cricketers
