= Raymond Friend =

Australian cricketer

Personal information
- Born: 11 April 1898; Melbourne, Australia
- Died: 1991 (aged 92–93); Toorak, Victoria, Australia

Domestic team information
- Years: Team
- 1927-1929: Tasmania
- Source: Cricinfo, 1 March 2016

Raymond Friend (11 April 1898 – 1991) was an Australian cricketer. He played two first-class matches for Tasmania between 1927 and 1929.

== See also ==
- List of Tasmanian representative cricketers
