= Rowan Sherriff =

Australian cricketer (born 1951)

Personal information
- Full name: Rowan James Sherriff
- Born: 7 July 1951 (age 75); Sheffield, Tasmania, Australia
- Batting: Right-handed
- Bowling: Left-arm fast-medium

Domestic team information
- Years: Team
- 1975/76–1979/80: Tasmania

Career statistics
Competition	FC	LA
Matches	6	10
Runs scored	31	17
Batting average	7.75	–
100s/50s	–/–	–/–
Top score	23	16*
Balls bowled	852	596
Wickets	10	11
Bowling average	44.00	35.45
5 wickets in innings	–	–
10 wickets in match	–	–
Best bowling	2/13	3/16
Catches/stumpings	4/–	4/–
- Source: Cricinfo, 4 January 2011

Rowan James Sherriff (born 7 July 1951) is a former Australian cricketer, who played for Tasmania. He was a left-handed fast-medium bowler who represented the team from 1976 until 1979.

== See also ==
- List of Tasmanian representative cricketers
