= Rupert Pennycuick =

Australian cricketer

Personal information
- Born: 11 April 1893; Jericho, Tasmania, Australia
- Died: 17 January 1963 (aged 69); Sydney, Australia

Domestic team information
- Years: Team
- 1911-1913: Tasmania
- Source: Cricinfo, 22 January 2016

Rupert Pennycuick (11 April 1893 – 17 January 1963) was an Australian cricketer. He played three first-class matches for Tasmania between 1911 and 1913.

== See also ==
- List of Tasmanian representative cricketers
