= Francis Woolley =

Australian cricketer (born 1957)

Personal information
- Born: 11 February 1957 (age 69); Launceston, Tasmania, Australia

Domestic team information
- Years: Team
- 1983-1984: Tasmania
- Source: Cricinfo, 20 March 2016

Francis Woolley (born 11 February 1957) is an Australian former cricketer. He played two List A matches for Tasmania between 1983 and 1984.

== See also ==
- List of Tasmanian representative cricketers
