= Leonard Tumilty =

Australian cricketer

Personal information
- Born: 12 June 1884; Launceston, Tasmania, Australia
- Died: 27 March 1962 (aged 77); Launceston, Tasmania, Australia

Domestic team information
- Years: Team
- 1911-1912: Tasmania
- Source: Cricinfo, 20 January 2016

Leonard Tumilty (12 June 1884 – 27 March 1962) was an Australian cricketer. He played two first-class matches for Tasmania between 1911 and 1912.

== See also ==
- List of Tasmanian representative cricketers
