= Reginald Davis (cricketer) =

Australian cricketer

Personal information
- Born: 22 October 1892; Invermay, Tasmania, Australia
- Died: 11 July 1957 (aged 64); Launceston, Tasmania, Australia

Domestic team information
- Years: Team
- 1912-1915: Tasmania
- Source: Cricinfo, 22 January 2016

Reginald Davis (22 October 1892 – 11 July 1957) was an Australian cricketer. He played four first-class matches for Tasmania between 1912 and 1915.

== See also ==
- List of Tasmanian representative cricketers
