= Nigel Brookes =

Australian cricketer (born 1967)

Personal information
- Full name: Nigel Leigh Brookes
- Born: 12 December 1967 (age 58); Nowra, New South Wales, Australia
- Batting: Right-handed
- Bowling: Right-arm fast-medium

Domestic team information
- Years: Team
- 1992/93: Tasmania

Career statistics
Competition	List A
Matches	1
Runs scored	–
Batting average	–
100s/50s	–/–
Top score	–
Balls bowled	54
Wickets	–
Bowling average	–
5 wickets in innings	–
10 wickets in match	–
Best bowling	–
Catches/stumpings	–/–
- Source: Cricinfo, 5 October 2011

Nigel Leigh Brookes (born 12 December 1967) is a former Australian cricketer. Brookes was a right-handed batsman who bowled right-arm fast-medium. He was born at Nowra, New South Wales.

Brookes played a single List A match for Tasmania against England A in February 1993. He wasn't required to bat in this match, while with the ball he bowled 9 wicket-less overs, with Tasmania winning by 24 runs. He made no further appearances for Tasmania.

== See also ==
- List of Tasmanian representative cricketers
