= John Mace (Australian cricketer) =

Australian cricketer

Personal information
- Born: 7 May 1839; Sydney, Australia
- Died: 18 April 1906 (aged 66); Hawley-with-Minley, Hampshire, England

Domestic team information
- Years: Team
- 1858: Tasmania
- Source: Cricinfo, 6 January 2016

John Mace (7 May 1839 – 18 April 1906) was an Australian cricketer. He played one first-class match for Tasmania in 1858.

== See also ==
- List of Tasmanian representative cricketers
