= Andrew Saballus =

Australian cricketer (born 1969)

Personal information
- Full name: Andrew William Saballus
- Born: 1 June 1969 (age 57); Hobart, Tasmania, Australia
- Batting: Right-handed
- Bowling: Right-arm fast-medium

Domestic team information
- Years: Team
- 1996/97: Tasmania
- Only FC: 15 November 1996 Tasmania v Western Australia
- LA debut: 27 October 1996 Tasmania v Victoria
- Last LA: 2 November 1996 Tasmania v New South Wales

Career statistics
| Competition | First-class | List A |
|---|---|---|
| Matches | 1 | 2 |
| Runs scored | – | 5 |
| Batting average | – | 2.50 |
| 100s/50s | – | 0/0 |
| Top score | – | 5 |
| Balls bowled | 120 | 78 |
| Wickets | 0 | 1 |
| Bowling average | – | 76.00 |
| 5 wickets in innings | – | 0 |
| 10 wickets in match | – | 0 |
| Best bowling | – | 1/35 |
| Catches/stumpings | 1/– | 0/– |
- Source: CricketArchive, 17 August 2010

Andrew William Saballus (born 1 June 1969) is an Australian cricketer, who played for Tasmania in the 1996–97 season. He was born at Hobart.
