= Scott Plummer =

Australian cricketer (born 1966)

Personal information
- Full name: Scott Malcolm Plummer
- Born: 1 August 1966 (age 60); Launceston, Tasmania, Australia
- Batting: Right-handed
- Bowling: Right-arm fast-medium
- Role: Bowler

Domestic team information
- Years: Team
- 1993/94: Tasmania

Career statistics
Competition	List A
Matches	1
Runs scored	–
Batting average	–
100s/50s	–
Top score	–
Balls bowled	63
Wickets	1
Bowling average	41.00
5 wickets in innings	0
10 wickets in match	0
Best bowling	1/41
Catches/stumpings	1/–
- Source: Cricinfo, 4 January 2011

Scott Malcolm Plummer (born 1 August 1966) was an Australian cricketer who played List A cricket once for the Tasmania in the 1993/94 season.
