= Chris Broadby =

Australian cricket player

Personal information
- Full name: Christopher Laurence Broadby
- Born: 17 March 1959 (age 67); Hobart, Tasmania, Australia
- Batting: Right-handed
- Bowling: Slow left-arm orthodox

Domestic team information
- Years: Team
- 1979–1988: Tasmania

Career statistics
Competition	First-class	List A
Matches	11	1
Runs scored	142	–
Batting average	14.20	–
100s/50s	0/0	–
Top score	42*	–
Balls bowled	2,504	–
Wickets	20	–
Bowling average	66.70	–
5 wickets in innings	0	–
10 wickets in match	0	–
Best bowling	2/35	–
Catches/stumpings	5/–	0/–
- Source: CricketArchive, 15 August 2010

Christopher Laurence Broadby (born 17 March 1959) is an Australian cricketer who played for Tasmania. He was a right-handed batsman and left-arm orthodox bowler who played for the side between 1979–80 and 1987–88.
