= Mark Scholes =

Australian cricketer (born 1957)

Personal information
- Full name: Mark Bradley Scholes
- Born: 1 July 1956 (age 70); Melbourne, Victoria, Australia
- Batting: Left-handed
- Bowling: Right-arm medium-fast

Domestic team information
- Years: Team
- 1978–1981: Tasmania

Career statistics
Competition	First-class	List A
Matches	8	5
Runs scored	178	14
Batting average	22.25	7.00
100s/50s	0/0	0/0
Top score	34	13*
Balls bowled	922	292
Wickets	14	5
Bowling average	35.85	46.40
5 wickets in innings	1	0
10 wickets in match	0	0
Best bowling	5/86	2/53
Catches/stumpings	8/–	1/–
- Source: CricketArchive, 19 August 2010

Mark Bradley Scholes (born 1 July 1956) is a former Australian cricketer who played for Tasmania from 1978 to 1982. He was a left-handed batsman and right-arm medium-fast bowler.
