= Neil Majewski =

Australian cricketer (born 1954)

Personal information
- Full name: Neil John Majewski
- Born: 27 May 1954 (age 72); Footscray, Melbourne, Australia
- Batting: Right-handed
- Bowling: Right-arm fast-medium

Domestic team information
- Years: Team
- 1978/79: Tasmania
- FC debut: 24 February 1979 Tasmania v New South Wales
- Last FC: 29 December 1979 Tasmania v New South Wales
- LA debut: 10 November 1979 Tasmania v Queensland
- Last LA: 24 November 1979 Tasmania v Western Australia

Career statistics
Competition	First-class	List A
Matches	5	4
Runs scored	80	6
Batting average	10.00	–
100s/50s	0/0	0/0
Top score	21	6*
Balls bowled	788	222
Wickets	5	5
Bowling average	98.00	34.80
5 wickets in innings	0	0
10 wickets in match	0	0
Best bowling	2/50	2/30
Catches/stumpings	1/–	1/–
- Source: CricketArchive, 16 August 2010

Neil John Majewski (born 27 May 1954) is an Australian cricketer who played for Tasmania. He played as a right-handed batsman and right-arm fast-medium bowler in 1978/79.
