= Barry Stewart (Australian cricketer) =

Australian cricketer

Personal information
- Born: 6 May 1940; Wynyard, Tasmania, Australia
- Died: 23 July 1975 (aged 35); Wynyard, Tasmania, Australia

Domestic team information
- Years: Team
- 1968-1969: Tasmania
- Source: Cricinfo, 13 March 2016

Barry Stewart (6 May 1940 – 23 July 1975) was an Australian cricketer. He played one first-class match for Tasmania in 1968/69.

== See also ==
- List of Tasmanian representative cricketers
