= Adam McGinty =

Australian cricketer (born 1971)

Personal information
- Full name: Adam David McGinty
- Born: 24 March 1971 (age 55); Melbourne, Victoria, Australia
- Batting: Left-handed
- Bowling: Right-arm fast-medium
- Role: Bowler

Domestic team information
- Years: Team
- 1994/95: Tasmania
- 1995/96–1996/97: Victoria

Career statistics
Competition	First-class	List A
Matches	2	1
Runs scored	5	0
Batting average	2.50	–
100s/50s	0/0	0/0
Top score	4	–
Balls bowled	302	60
Wickets	4	0
Bowling average	36.50	–
5 wickets in innings	0	–
10 wickets in match	0	–
Best bowling	2/67	–
Catches/stumpings	2/–	0/–
- Source: CricInfo, 14 August 2010

Adam David McGinty (born 24 March 1971) is a former Australian cricketer who played for Victoria and Tasmania.
