= Norman Murray =

Australian cricketer

Personal information
- Born: 2 November 1908; Perth, Western Australia
- Died: 21 August 1967 (aged 58); Sydney, New South Wales

Domestic team information
- Years: Team
- 1930/31: Tasmania
- Source: Cricinfo, 4 March 2016

Norman Eric Murray (2 November 1908 – 21 August 1967) was an Australian cricketer. He played two first-class matches for Tasmania between 1930 and 1931.
