= Todd Pinnington =

Australian cricketer (born 1973)

Personal information
- Full name: Todd Andrew Pinnington
- Born: 21 March 1973 (age 53); Hobart, Tasmania, Australia
- Batting: Right-handed
- Role: Wicket-keeper

Domestic team information
- Years: Team
- 1994/95–2000/01: Tasmania
- FC debut: 17 November 1994 Tasmania v Victoria
- Last FC: 3 January 2001 Tasmania v Queensland
- LA debut: 6 December 1998 Tasmania v New South Wales
- Last LA: 21 January 2001 Tasmania v South Australia

Career statistics
Competition	First-class	List A
Matches	2	7
Runs scored	11	62
Batting average	3.66	15.50
100s/50s	0/0	0/0
Top score	5	38
Catches/stumpings	2/0	2/1
- Source: CricketArchive, 5 January 2011

Todd Andrew Pinnington (born 21 March 1973) is an Australian cricketer who played for Tasmania from 1994 until 2001. An agile wicketkeeper, Pinnington suffered from being considered second choice behind the reliable Mark Atkinson. He is also an excellent lower order attacking batsman who has scored heavily in the Tasmanian Grade Cricket competition.
