= Nicholas Clayton (cricketer) =

Australian cricketer

Personal information
- Born: 11 March 1826; Tasmania, Australia
- Died: 23 April 1867 (aged 41); Auckland, New Zealand

Domestic team information
- Years: Team
- 1858: Tasmania
- Source: Cricinfo, 5 January 2016

Nicholas Clayton (11 March 1826 – 23 April 1867) was an Australian cricketer. He played one first-class match for Tasmania in 1858.

== See also ==
- List of Tasmanian representative cricketers
