= Wade Irvine =

Australian cricketer (born 1986)

Personal information
- Born: 11 December 1986 (age 39); Canberra, Australia
- Batting: Right-handed
- Bowling: Right-arm medium; Right-arm offbreak
- Role: Batsman

Domestic team information
- Years: Team
- 2009/10: Tasmania
- Source: Cricinfo, 20 March 2016

Wade Irvine (born 11 December 1986) is an Australian cricketer. He played one List A match for Tasmania during the 2009–10 season.
