= List of Tasmania first-class cricket records =

The following is a collection of the Tasmania cricket team's first-class records. They are an Australian state cricket side. The Tasmania cricket team played the first ever first-class cricket match in Australia.

== Tasmania cricket team first-class records ==
=== Highest team totals ===
Rank	Runs	Opponent	Venue	Season
1	592	South Australia	Adelaide Oval, Adelaide	1987/88
2	569-6d	South Australia	Bellerive Oval, Hobart	1997/98
3	553-7d	Western Australia	WACA, Perth	2006/07
4	550	New South Wales	Bellerive Oval, Hobart	1990/91
5	548-5d	India	Bellerive Oval, Hobart	1999/00
Source: . Last updated: 22 June 2007.

=== Highest team totals against ===
Rank	Runs	Opponent	Venue	Season
1	1059	Victoria	MCG, Melbourne	1922/23
2	839	New South Wales	SCG, Sydney	1898/99
3	688	South Australia	Adelaide Oval, Adelaide	1935/36
4	637	South Australia	Adelaide Oval, Adelaide	1987/88
5	660	Victoria	MCG, Melbourne	1909/10
Source: . Last updated: 22 June 2007.

=== Lowest team totals ===
Rank	Runs	Opponent	Venue	Season
1	18	Victoria	MCG, Melbourne	1868/69
2	40	Otago	Carisbrook, Dunedin	1883/84
3	49	New South Wales	SCG, Sydney	1910/11
4	59	Canterbury	Lancaster Park, Dunedin	1883/84
=5	65	South Africa	NTCA Ground, Launceston	1952/53
=5	65	South Australia	Adelaide Oval, Adelaide	1961/62
Source: . Last updated: 22 June 2007.

=== Lowest team totals against ===
Rank	Runs	Opponent	Venue	Season
1	50	Victoria	Launceston Cricket Club Ground, Launceston	1853/54
2	53	New South Wales	Bellerive Oval, Hobart	2006/07
3	55	South Australia	Bellerive Oval, Hobart	2010/11
4	57	Victoria	Launceston Cricket Club Ground, Launceston	1850/51
5	62	Queensland	Gabba, Brisbane	2008/09
Source: . Last updated: 30 September 2013.

=== Greatest win margins (by innings) ===
Rank	Margin	Opponent	Venue	Season
1	inns & 151 runs	South Australia	Bellerive Oval, Hobart	1997/98
2				
3				
4				
5				
Source: . Last updated: 27 June 2007.

=== Greatest win margins (by runs) ===
Rank	Margin	Opponent	Venue	Season
1	421 runs	New South Wales*	Bellerive Oval, Hobart	2006/07
2	365 runs	Victoria	TCA Ground, Hobart	1898/99
3	213 runs	South Australia	Adelaide Oval, Adelaide	2003/04
4	195 runs	South Australia	Bellerive Oval, Hobart	2004/05
5	182 runs	South Australia	Bellerive Oval, Hobart	2011/12
Source: . Last updated: 30 September 2013.

* 2012–13 Sheffield Shield Final

== Individual records ==
=== Most matches played ===
Rank	Matches	Player	Period
1	168	Jamie Cox	1987/88 – 2005/06
2	145	Michael Di Venuto	1991/92 – 2007/08
3	139	David Boon	1978/79 – 1998/99
4	137	Daniel Marsh	1996/97 – 2009/10
5	112	Shaun Young	1991/92 – 2001/02
Source: . Last updated: 30 September 2013.

=== Most catches (fielder) ===
Rank	Catches	Player	Matches
1	172	Daniel Marsh	137
2	155	Michael Di Venuto	145
3	101	David Boon	139
4	81	Jamie Cox	168
5	77	Dene Hills	109
Source: . Last updated: 27 June 2007.

=== Most dismissals ===
Rank	Dismissals	Player	Matches
1	290 (261 c./29 st.)	Mark Atkinson	95
2	232 (220 c./12 st.)	Sean Clingeleffer	74
3	176 (168 c./8 st.)	Tim Paine	60
4	161 (145 c./16 st.)	Roger Woolley	85
5	124 (119 c./5 st.)	Richard Soule	57
Source: . Last updated: 30 September 2013.

== Batting records ==
=== Highest individual scores ===
Rank	Runs	Player	Opponent	Venue	Season
1	274	Jack Badcock	Victoria	NTCA Ground, Launceston	1933–34
2	265	Dene Hills	South Australia	Bellerive Oval, Hobart	1997–98
3	245	Jamie Cox	New South Wales	Bellerive Oval, Hobart	1999–2000
4	233	Ricky Ponting	Queensland	Albion	2000–01
5	229	Evan Gulbis	South Australia	Bellerive Oval, Hobart	2013–14
Source: . Last updated: 27 June 2007.

=== Most career runs ===
Rank	Runs	Player	Career
1	11,812 (304 inns.)	Jamie Cox	1987/88 – 2005/06
2	10,117 (591 inns.)	Michael Di Venuto	1991/92 –
3	9,096 (235 inns.)	David Boon	1978/79 – 1998/99
4	7,630 (202 inns.)	Dene Hills	1991/92 – 2001/02
5	5,999 (186 inns.)	Shaun Young	1991/92 – 2001/02
Source: . Last updated: 27 June 2007.

=== Most runs in a season ===
Rank	Runs	Player	Average	Season
1	1,464 (18 inns.)	Michael Bevan	97.60	2004/05
2	1,349 (21 inns.)	Jamie Cox	67.45	1996/97
3	1,220 (23 inns.)	Dene Hills	55.45	1997/98
4	1,070 (19 inns.)	Jamie Cox	66.87	2000/01
5	1,068 (23 inns.)	Dene Hills	48.54	1993/94
Source: . Last updated: 27 June 2007.

=== Highest batting averages ===
Rank	Average	Player	Career
1	60.07 (98 inns.)	Ricky Ponting	1992/93 –
2	46.91 (27 inns.)	John Hampshire	1961–1984
3	44.07 (88 inns.)	Brian Davison	1967/68 – 1987/88
4	42.90 (46 inns.)	Shane Watson	2000/01 –
5	41.15 (235 inns.)	David Boon	1978/79 – 1998/99
Qualification: 20 innings. Source: . Last updated: 27 June 2007.

=== Most centuries ===
Rank	Centuries	Player	Matches
1	34	Jamie Cox	168
2	27	Ricky Ponting	54
3	22	David Boon	139
4	19	Dene Hills	109
5	12	Michael Di Venuto	116
Source: . Last updated: 27 June 2007.

=== Partnership records ===
Wicket	Runs	Batsmen	Opponent	Venue	Season
1	297	Dene Hills & Jamie Cox	Victoria	Bellerive Oval, Hobart	1997/98
2	294	Jamie Cox & Michael Di Venuto	New South Wales	Bellerive Oval, Hobart	1999/00
3	294	Ben Dunk & Alex Doolan	Victoria	Bellerive Oval, Hobart	2015/16
4	319	Michael Bevan & Daniel Marsh	Western Australia	Bellerive Oval, Hobart	2004/05
5	319	Ricky Ponting & Rod Tucker	Western Australia	Bellerive Oval, Hobart	1994/95
6	213	Brian Davison & Roger Woolley	South Australia	Adelaide Oval, Adelaide	1980/81
7	293*	Ricky Ponting & Jason Krejza	New South Wales	Bellerive Oval, Hobart	2012/13
8	148	Brian Davison & Peter Faulkner	South Australia	Adelaide Oval, Adelaide	1983/84
9	148	Colin Newton & Horace Smith	Victoria	NTCA Ground, Launceston	1921/22
10	122	William Ward & Norman Dodds	Victoria	TCA Ground, Hobart	1898/99
Source: . Last updated: 26 February 2016.

== Bowling records ==
=== Most career wickets ===
Rank	Wickets	Player	Matches	Average
1	292	Jackson Bird	62	21.44
2	262	Ben Hilfenhaus	68	29.54
3	221	Luke Butterworth	69	24.61
4	210	Colin Miller	100	31.7
5	201	Shaun Young	104	39.22
Source: . Last updated: 27 June 2007.

=== Most wickets in a season ===
Rank	Wickets	Player	Matches	Season
1	70	Colin Miller	12	1997/98
2	50	Chris Matthews	11	1991/92
3	47	Chris Matthews	11	1992/93
4	45	Adam Griffith	9	2004/05
5	43	Peter McPhee	10	1990/91
Source: . Last updated: 27 June 2007.

=== Best career average ===
Rank	Average	Player	Balls	Wickets
1	20.38	Charles Eady	4,706	110
2	26.27	Michael Holding	2,230	36
3	27.98	Shane Watson	2,254	50
4	28.23	Edward Windsor	5,822	126
5	28.72	Shane Jurgensen	3,441	54
Qualification: 2000 balls bowled. Source: . Last updated: 27 June 2007.

=== Best figures in an innings ===
Rank	Figures	Player	Opponent	Venue	Season
1	8/31	William Brown	Victoria	TCA Ground, Hobart	1857/58
2	8/34	Charles Eady	Victoria	Melbourne Cricket Ground, Melbourne	1895/96
3	8/95	Peter Clough	Western Australia	NTCA Ground, Launceston	1983/84
4	7/24	Tom Kendall	Otago	Carisbrook, Dunedin	1883/84
5	7/42	William Brown	Victoria	TCA Ground, Hobart	1857/58
Source: . Last updated: 27 June 2007.

=== Best figures in a match ===
Rank	Bowling	Player	Opponent	Venue	Season
1	15/73	William Brown	Victoria	TCA Ground, Hobart	1857/58
2	13/185	Charles Eady	Victoria	TCA Ground, Hobart	1906/07
3	12/63	Charles Eady	Victoria	MCG, Melbourne	1895–96
4	12/119	Colin Miller	South Australia	Bellerive Oval, Hobart	1997–98
5	12/129	Charles Eady	Victoria	TCA Ground, Hobart	1898–99
Source: . Last updated: 27 June 2007.
