= List of Tasmania cricket captains =

The Australian state of Tasmania has one of the longest traditions of cricket-playing in the southern hemisphere. Cricket is recorded as having first been played in Tasmania very shortly after the arrival of British settlers on the island on 12 September 1803, however it wasn't until nearly fifty years later that First-class cricket was to be played there.

Despite the long wait since the foundation of the colony, Tasmania played in the first ever first-class cricket match in Australia, which was played on 11 February and 12 February 1851, against Victoria, with Tasmania emerging victorious by 3 wickets. For that first match, Tasmania was captained by John Marshall.

Following that first ever First-class match Tasmania endured a long period of isolation, in which the island's cricketers had to content themselves with occasional First-class matches against other colonies, primarily Victoria, and touring or representative sides.

Australia's elite First-class cricket competition, the Sheffield Shield was established in 1892, however Tasmania was not invited to participate in that elite competition until 1977, and even then, their first four seasons were on a limited fixture list.

These are lists of the men who have been the official Tasmanian captains in First-class, List A and Twenty20 domestic matches.
Where a player has a dagger (†) after his period of captaincy, that denotes that player deputised for the appointed captain. The dagger classification follows that adopted by Wisden Cricketers' Almanack.

== First-class captains ==
This is a list of cricketers who have captained the Tasmanian cricket team for at least one First-class match. It is complete up to the 2018/19 season.

Tasmanian First-class captains
Number	Name	Period of captaincy	Played	Won	Lost	Tied	Drawn	Winning rate
1	John Marshall	1851/52-53/54	3	2	1	0	0	66.66%
2	Robert Still	1857/58	1	0	1	0	0	0%
3	William Brown	1858/59	1	0	1	0	0	0%
4	John Arthur	1868/69	1	0	1	0	0	0%
5	John Davies	1871/72-1883/84	5	0	4	0	1	0%
6	William Walker	1873/74-77/78	2	0	2	0	0	0%
7	George Herbert Bailey	1879/80	1	0	1	0	0	0%
8	William Sidebottom	1888/89	1	0	1	0	0	0%
9	Charles McAllen	1889/90	1	0	1	0	0	0%
10	Claude Rock	1890/91-93/94	2	0	2	0	0	0%
11	Kenneth Burn	1893/94-1909/10	14	6	8	0	0	42.85%
12	Edgar Hawson	1904/05†	2	1	1	0	0	50%
13	Tom Tabart	1909/10†	1	0	1	0	0	0%
14	Ernest Harrison	1909/10†	1	0	1	0	0	0%
15	Reginald Hawson	1910/11-1914/15	9	3	5	0	1	33.33%
16	Llewellyn Thomas	1913/14†	2	0	2	0	0	0%
17	Sidney Lord	1914/15	1	0	1	0	0	0%
18	Thomas Carroll	1922/23	1	0	0	0	1	0%
19	Horace Smith	1923/24	1	1	0	0	0	0%
20	Alfred Rushforth	1924/25-35/36	9	3	5	0	1	33.33%
21	George Allan	1926/27-27/28†	2	0	2	0	0	0%
22	Rex Bennett	1926/27†	1	0	1	0	0	0%
23	Alfred Watson	1927/28†	2	0	2	0	0	0%
24	Jim Atkinson	1929/30-33/34	13	2	5	0	6	15.38%
25	Douglas Green	1931/32-33/34†	5	0	1	0	4	0%
26	Alan Newton	1932/33†	1	0	0	0	1	0%
27	Raymond Ferrall	1934/35†	1	0	0	0	1	0%
28	Sydney Putman	1937/38†	1	0	0	0	1	0%
29	Ronald Morrisby	1937/38-1951/52	11	0	6	0	5	0%
30	Jack Laver	1950/51†	1	0	1	0	0	0%
31	Emerson Rodwell	1950/51-55/56	5	1	2	0	2	20%
32	Thomas Davidson	1952/53†	2	0	2	0	0	0%
33	Bertie Brownlow	1956/57	2	0	2	0	0	0%
34	Terence Cowley	1958/59-61/62	9	0	7	0	2	0%
35	Len Maddocks	1963/64-67/68	3	0	1	0	2	0%
36	John Hampshire	1968/69	1	0	0	0	1	0%
37	Rohan Kanhai	1969/70	2	0	0	0	2	0%
38	Billy Ibadulla	1970/71-71/72	2	0	2	0	0	0%
39	Jack Simmons	1972/73-78/79	10	1	4	0	5	10.00%
40	Brian Davison	1979/80-87/88	27	2	18	0	7	7.40%
41	Roger Woolley	1981/82-85/86†	29	3	5	0	21	10.34%
42	David Boon	1985/86-98/99	58	13	25	0	20	22.41%
43	Mark Ray	1985/86†	7	0	5	0	2	0%
44	Keith Bradshaw	1986/87†	1	0	1	0	0	20%
45	Dirk Wellham	1987/88-90/91	30	5	6	0	19	16.66%
46	Dave Gilbert	1990/91†	5	1	2	0	2	20%
47	Rod Tucker	1991/92-94/95	30	7	5	0	18	23.33%
48	Jamie Cox	1999/2000-02/03	38	11	16	0	11	28.94%
49	Ricky Ponting	2001/02-2012	7	2	2	0	3	28.57%
50	Daniel Marsh	2002/03-2008/09	50	17	21	0	12	34%
51	Damien Wright	2003/04†	1	0	0	0	1	0%
52	Michael Di Venuto	2004/05†	5	1	3	0	1	20%
53	Michael Bevan	2004/05†	1	0	0	0	1	0%
54	George Bailey	2009/10-2018	61	22	25	0	13	36.06%
55	Xavier Doherty	2011	1	1	0	0	0	100.00%
56	Tim Paine	2010-2014	12	5	3	0	4	41.66%
57	Alex Doolan	2014-2016	7	0	6	0	1	0.00%
58	Jackson Bird	2016	1	0	0	0	1	0.00%
59	Matthew Wade	2018–present	0	0	0	0	0	0.00%

Notes:

- Where there are periods of time in which it appears there is no captain, it is because prior to Tasmania's entry into the Sheffield Shield they often went for periods in which the state played no first class cricket.
- Jack Simmons captained Tasmania to their first ever win in a Sheffield Shield match in against Western Australia, who they beat by 4 wickets on 30 January 1979.
- Whilst Ricky Ponting was in effect the Tasmanian cricket captain from 2001/02 until he announced he was standing down on 21 November 2007, this was primarily a ceremonial appointment in order to have the Australian captain as Tasmanian captain as well. In effect Daniel Marsh, his Vice-Captain, has performed the captaincy duties on most occasions, and was appointed outright following Ponting standing aside.
- Daniel Marsh captained Tasmania to their first ever Pura Cup title in 2006/07, when they beat the New South Wales Blues by 421 runs in the final on 23 March 2007.
- Source: Cricinfo Australian Domestic Seasons

== List A captains ==
Despite not participating in the Sheffield Shield at that time, Tasmania was included in the inaugural List A cricket competition in Australia that began in 1969/70, and has participated in every subsequent season. This is a complete list of every man who has captained the Tasmanian Tigers in List A cricket.

Tasmanian List A captains
Number	Name	Period of captaincy	Played	Won	Lost	Tied	No result	Winning rate
1	Alan Knott	1969/70	1	0	1	0	0	0%
2	Khalid Ibadulla	1970/71-71/72	2	0	2	0	0	0%
3	Jack Simmons	1972/73-78/79	15	6	9	0	0	40.00%
4	Brian Davison	1979/80-87/88	12	4	8	0	0	33.33%
5	Roger Woolley	1982/83-85/86	9	1	8	0	0	11.11%
6	David Boon	1985/86-98/99	35	12	22	0	1	34.28%
7	Keith Bradshaw	1986/87†	2	1	1	0	0	50%
8	Dirk Wellham	1988/89-90/91	7	0	7	0	0	0%
9	Rod Tucker	1992/93-95/96	13	3	10	0	0	23.07%
10	Jamie Cox	1996/97-2002/03	31	11	18	1	1	36.66%
11	Dene Hills	1999/2000†	1	1	0	0	0	100%
12	Ricky Ponting	2001/02-07/08	8	2	6	0	0	25.00%
13	Daniel Marsh	2003/04-2008/09	48	23	23	1	1	47.91%
14	Michael Di Venuto	2005/06†	8	3	4	1	0	43.75%
15	George Bailey	2006/7† & 2009/10 – present	48	27	26	1	1	56.25%
16	Xavier Doherty	2011	1	0	1	0	0	0%
17	Tim Paine	2013–present	11	6	5	0	0	54.54%
18	Jordan Silk	2014	4	1	2	0	1	33.33%

Notes:

- Source: Cricinfo Australian Domestic Seasons

All statistics correct as of 19 October 2016.

== Twenty20 captains ==
Tasmania played their first Twenty20 cricket match against the Queensland Bulls on 6 January 2006; however, the match ended with no result. Below is the record of all the men who have captained Tasmania in Twenty20 cricket matches.

Tasmanian Twenty20 captains
Number	Name	Period of captaincy	Played	Won	Lost	Tied	No result	Winning rate
1	Michael Di Venuto	2005/06	2	0	1	0	1	0%
2	Daniel Marsh	2006/07-2008/09	13	6	7	0	0	46.15%
3	George Bailey	2007/08† & 2009/10 – 2011	12	6	6	0	0	50%
4	Tim Paine	2010	1	0	1	0	0	0%

Notes:

- Source: Cricinfo Australian Domestic Seasons

All statistics correct as of 1 February 2011.

== See also ==
- List of Tasmanian representative cricketers
- Tasmanian Tigers
