= Mowbray Cricket Club =

- Nickname: The Eagles
- Founded: 1955
- Home ground: Invermay Park
- Colours: Maroon and Gold
- Chairman: Scott Plummer
- Head coach: John Hayes
- Captain: Spencer Hayes
- 2024–25: 2nd

Mowbray Cricket Club (MCC), also known as Mowbray Eagles, is a cricket team which represents the northern suburbs of Launceston in the Northern Tasmanian Cricket Association grade cricket competition, in the Australian state of Tasmania.

There is evidence of a cricket club in the Mowbray district as early as 1922. The current Mowbray cricket club was established in 1955 and has a history of nurturing outstanding Tasmanian talent including Australian representatives, Ricky Ponting and Greg Campbell, as well as Tasmanian representatives dating back to the 1950s.

The Mowbray club won the First Grade premiership in its debut season, 1955-56. In 1998-99, Mowbray became the first club in NTCA history to win Premierships from 1st to 4th grade in a single season (the four grades at the time being 1st, 2nd, 3rd & Under 16). The club's most recent success came in the 2025-26 season, winning the Cricket North T20 pennant.

== Australian Representatives ==
Greg Campbell
Ricky Ponting

== Tasmanian Representatives ==
Kevin Badcock
Ray Biffin
Roger Brown
Greg Campbell
Troy Cooley
Terry Cowley
Rex Davidson
Jarrod Freeman+
Bill Hird
Ricky Ponting+
Scott Plummer
Stan Reid
Michael Sellers
Richard Soule
Peter Warren
+ Also represented the Hobart Hurricanes in the BBL

== Other Notable Players To Represent Mowbray ==
John Abrahams
Harry Frei
Jack Simmons
Franklyn Stephenson

== Premierships ==
1ST GRADE	2ND GRADE	3RD GRADE	4TH GRADE	U16 GRADE	OVER 40	*CN T20
1955-56	1982-83	1984-85	2021-22	1998-99	2018-19	2025-26
1956-57	1991-92	1992-93	2023-24		2019-20	
1961-62	1997-98	1993-94			2020-21	
1974-75	1998-99	1998-99			2021-22	
1975-76	2002-03	2000-01			2023-24	
1981-82	2004-05	2019-20			2024-25	
1986-87	2005-06					
1998-99	2006-07					
2015-16	2008-09					
	2010-11					
	2016-17					
	2017-18					

- CN = Cricket North

== Northern Tasmanian Cricket Association/Cricket North Honours ==
BEST PLAYER
1991-92 - Richard Soule (joint winner)
1996-97 - Tim Quill
2005-06 - Jerome Illingworth
2013-14 - Justin Reeves

BATTING AVERAGE (TO 1982-83)
1957-58 - Rex Davidson
1961-62 - Terry Cowley
1963-64 - Laurie Farrell
1976-77 - Chris Holt
1981-82 - Stan Reid

BOWLING AVERAGE (TO 1982-83)
1955-56 - Bill Hird
1957-58 - R Butterworth
1958-59 - Terry Cowley
1961-62 - Terry Cowley
1962-63 - Terry Cowley
1974-75 - Brian Swindells
1977-78 - Peter Warren

BEST UNDER 19 PLAYER
1991-92 - Ricky Ponting
1997-98 - Clinton Reid
2017-18 - Jarrod Freeman

LIFE MEMBER
2005 - Ricky Ponting
2016 - Roger Brown

BATTING AVERAGE - WOMEN
2016-17 - Lyn Hendley

== Life Members ==
- Mrs Patricia Hird
- Bill Hird
- Keith Bain
- Terry Cowley
- Rex Davidson
- Max Rees
- John Houston
- Merv Gray
- Mrs Dawn Hughes
- Gordon Clarke
- Brian Swindells
- Graeme Hodgman
- Ken Warren
- Len Jones
- Michael Sellers
- David Sarich
- Brian Lynch
- Len Walsh
- Brad Jones
- Mark Illingworth
- Mrs Rosemary Tucker
- Mrs Pat Swindells
- Richard Soule
- Troy Cooley
- Dr Frank Madill
- Juan Salter
- Stan Reid
- Scott O'Byrne
- Ricky Ponting
- Clinton Reid
- Jerome Illingworth
- Simon Howard
- Mrs Debbie Reid
- Darren Price
- Wayne Richardson
- Mrs Lyn Bishop
- Matthew Scolyer
- Andrew Gower
- John Le Fevre
- Nick Hayes
- Mrs Narelle Scott
- Dale Scott
- Peter Warren
