= Jack Laver =

Australian cricketer (1917–2017)

Personal information
- Full name: Jack Francis Lee Laver
- Born: 9 March 1917; Malvern, Melbourne, Victoria
- Died: 3 October 2017 (aged 100); Launceston, Tasmania
- Batting: Right-handed
- Bowling: Right-arm off-spin

Domestic team information
- Years: Team
- 1946/47–1951/52: Tasmania

Career statistics
Competition	First-class
Matches	13
Runs scored	343
Batting average	14.91
100s/50s	0/2
Top score	93
Balls bowled	1,477
Wickets	20
Bowling average	42.80
5 wickets in innings	1
10 wickets in match	0
Best bowling	5/26
Catches/stumpings	13/–
- Source: CricketArchive, 15 October 2017

Jack Francis Lee Laver (9 March 1917 – 3 October 2017) was a Tasmanian cricketer who played 13 matches of first class cricket for Tasmania between 1946 and 1952.

Laver was an off-spin bowler and lower-order batsman. He made his highest first-class score of 93 on his debut, playing against Victoria in 1946–47. His innings took only 94 minutes. Two weeks later he took his best bowling figures of 5 for 26 (off only 34 balls) against the touring MCC team, including the wickets of Denis Compton and Bill Edrich. He captained Tasmania against Victoria in the 1950–51 season, but Tasmania lost the match by nine wickets.

He served in World War II as a lieutenant in the 6th Australian Division Provost Company.

In March 2017 he became only the third Australian first-class cricketer, after Ted Martin and Harold Stapleton, to reach 100 years of age. He died on 3 October 2017; his wife Nancy predeceased him. Test cricketer Frank Laver was his uncle, and tennis star Rod Laver was a second cousin.

Preceded by Ronald Morrisby	Tasmanian First-class cricket captains 1950/51	Succeeded by Emerson Rodwell
