= 2006–07 Sheffield Shield season =

Cricket tournament

- Administrator: Cricket Australia
- Cricket format: First class
- Tournament format: Double round-robin
- Champions: Tasmania (1st title)
- Participants: 6
- Matches: 31
- Player of the series: Chris Rogers (Western Australia )
- Most runs: Chris Rogers (Western Australia) (1202)
- Most wickets: Ben Hilfenhaus (Tasmania) (60)

The 2006–07 Sheffield Shield season, known as the Pura Cup, was the 105th season of the Australian domestic First-class cricket competition played in Australia, known as the Pura Cup. Tasmania defeated New South Wales in the final at Bellerive Oval, winning the trophy for the first time.

== Fixtures ==
- Game 1 – Qld v Tas (GABBA), Oct 13–16
- Game 2 – WA v Vic (WACA), Oct 15–18
- Game 3 – NSW v SA (SCG), Oct 17–20
- Game 4 – WA v Tas (WACA), Oct 22–25
- Game 5 – Qld v NSW (GABBA), Oct 27–30
- Game 6 – SA v Vic (Adelaide Oval), Oct 27–30
- Game 7 – SA v NSW (Adelaide Oval), Nov 3–6
- Game 8 – WA v Qld (WACA), Nov 12–15
- Game 9 – Vic v Tas (MCG), Nov 14–17
- Game 10 – NSW v WA (SCG), Nov 24–27
- Game 11 – Vic v Qld (MCG), Nov 24–27
- Game 12 – Tas v SA (Bellerive), Dec 6–9
- Game 13 – Vic v NSW (MCG), Dec 15–18
- Game 14 – SA v Qld (Adelaide Oval), Dec 15–18
- Game 15 – Tas v WA (Bellerive), Dec 19–22
- Game 16 – NSW v Vic (SCG), Jan 16–19
- Game 17 – Tas v Qld (Bellerive), Jan 19–22
- Game 18 – WA v SA (WACA), Jan 19–22
- Game 19 – Vic v SA (MCG), Jan 26–29
- Game 20 – NSW v Tas (SCG), Jan 27–30
- Game 21 – Qld v WA (GABBA), Jan 28–31
- Game 22 – Qld v SA (GABBA), Feb 9–12
- Game 23 – WA v NSW (WACA), Feb 9–12
- Game 24 – Tas v Vic (Bellerive), Feb 12–15
- Game 25 – NSW v Qld (SCG), Mar 1–4
- Game 26 – Vic v WA (MCG), Mar 1–4
- Game 27 – SA v Tas (Adelaide Oval), Mar 1–4
- Game 28 – Tas v NSW (Bellerive), Mar 8–11
- Game 29 – SA v WA (Adelaide Oval), Mar 8–11
- Game 30 – Qld v Vic (GABBA), Mar 8–11

== Squads ==
VICTORIA

- Cricket Australia Contract: Brad Hodge, Shane Warne
- State Contract: Jason Arnberger, Rob Cassell, Adam Crosthwaite, Gerard Denton, Shane Harwood, David Hussey, Nick Jewell, Michael Klinger, Brad Knowles, Michael Lewis, Lloyd Mash, Andrew McDonald, Jon Moss, Dirk Nannes, Peter Siddle, Cameron White, Allan Wise
- Rookie Contract: Grant Baldwin, Aiden Blizzard, Aaron Finch, Matthew Gale, Jon Holland, Peter Nevill

NEW SOUTH WALES

- Cricket Australia Contract: Nathan Bracken, Stuart Clark, Michael Clarke, Brad Haddin, Phil Jaques, Simon Katich, Brett Lee, Glenn McGrath, Stuart MacGill
- State Contract: Aaron Bird, Doug Bollinger, Mark Cameron, Beau Casson, Ed Cowan, Scott Coyte, Murray Creed, Nathan Hauritz, Moises Henriques, Jason Krejza, Grant Lambert, Tim Lang, Greg Mail, Matthew Nicholson, Aaron O’Brien, James Packman, Grant Roden, Craig Simmons, Daniel Smith, Dominic Thornely
- Rookie Contract: Tom Cooper, Peter Forrest, John Hastings, Usman Khawaja, Stephen O'Keefe, Martin Paskal, David Warner

QUEENSLAND

- Cricket Australia Contract: Matthew Hayden, Mitchell Johnson, Michael Kasprowicz, Andrew Symonds, Shane Watson
- State Contract: Andy Bichel, Ryan Broad, Daniel Doran, Chris Hartley, James Hopes, Shane Jurgensen, Nick Kruger, Martin Love, Jimmy Maher, Brendan Nash, Ashley Noffke, Clinton Perren, Craig Philipson, Nathan Rimmington, Chris Simpson, Lachlan Stevens, Grant Sullivan
- Rookie Contracts: Murray Bragg, Ben Cutting, Ryan LeLoux, Nathan Reardon

SOUTH AUSTRALIA

- Cricket Australia Contract: Daniel Cullen, Jason Gillespie, Shaun Tait
- State Contract: Nathan Adcock, Cullen Bailey, Greg Blewett, Cameron Borgas, Ben Cameron, Mark Cleary, Mark Cosgrove, Shane Deitz, Matthew Elliott, Callum Ferguson, Daniel Harris, Ryan Harris, Trent Kelly, Darren Lehmann, Graham Manou, Gary Putland, Paul Rofe
- Rookie Contract: Lachlan Oswald-Jacobs, Tom Plant, Simon Roberts, Chadd Sayers, Ken Skewes

WESTERN AUSTRALIA

- Cricket Australia Contract: Adam Gilchrist, Brad Hogg, Mike Hussey, Justin Langer, Damien Martyn
- State Contract: David Bandy, Brett Dorey, Ben Edmondson, Sean Ervine, Shawn Gillies, Aaron Heal, Clint Heron, Mathew Inness, Andrew James, Tim MacDonald, Steve Magoffin, Shaun Marsh, Scott Meuleman, Marcus North, Chris Rogers, Luke Ronchi, Adam Voges, Darren Wates, Peter Worthington
- Rookie Contract: Arron Crawford, Nathan Coulter-Nile, Liam Davis, Theo Doropoulos, Craig King, Josh Mangan, Luke Pomersbach

TASMANIA

- Cricket Australia Contract: Ricky Ponting
- State Contract: George Bailey, Michael Bevan, Travis Birt, Luke Butterworth, Sean Clingeleffer, David Dawson, Michael Dighton, Michael Di Venuto, Xavier Doherty, Andrew Downton, Brendan Drew, Brett Geeves, Adam Griffith, Ben Hilfenhaus, Dan Marsh, Tim Paine, Damien Wright
- Rookie Contract: Dane Anderson, Alex Doolan, Chris Duval, Jason Shelton, Matthew Wade, Jonathon Wells
- Squad Members: Nick Grainer, Scott Kremerskothen, Rhett Lockyear, Darren McNees, Adam Polkinghorne, Jade Selby, Luke Swards, Nathan Wegman

== Points table ==
Team	Pld	W	L	T	D	Abd	Pts	Quot
Tasmania	10	6	2	0	2	0	38	1.017
New South Wales	10	4	3	0	3	0	28	1.042
Victoria	10	4	3	0	3	0	26	1.112
Queensland	10	4	4	0	2	0	26	0.920
Western Australia	10	3	4	0	3	0	26	1.206
South Australia	10	1	6	0	3	0	12	0.776

== Final ==
The Final was played between Tasmania and New South Wales from March 19 to 23, 2007. By virtue of finishing on top of the table at the end of the season, Tasmania won the right to host the final at Bellerive Oval. Highlighted by individual efforts from Ben Hilfenhaus, Damien Wright and man-of-the-match Luke Butterworth, Tasmania won convincingly by 421 runs to claim their maiden first-class championship, after finishing runner-up three times. They had only been competing full-time since the 1982/83 season; before that, when they joined the competition, they only played one game against every state.

(H) Tasmania	v	New South Wales
340; Damien Wright 67; Doug Bollinger 5-73		230; Phil Jaques 82; Luke Butterworth 4-33
460; Sean Clingeleffer 107; Luke Butterworth 106		149; Damien Wright 5-13; Ben Hilfenhaus 4-22

Tasmania won by 421 runs
Venue: Bellerive Oval

== Statistics ==
=== Most runs ===
Player	Team	Mat	Inns	NO	Runs	Ave	HS	100	50
Chris Rogers	Western Australia	10	17		1202	70.70	279	3	7
Phil Jaques	New South Wales	11	21		987	47.00	192	3	5
Michael Di Venuto	Tasmania	11	20	2	961	53.38	181	3	5
David Hussey	Victoria	10	18	1	911	53.58	131	3	5
Dominic Thornely	New South Wales	11	21	2	801	42.15	138	2	2

=== Most wickets ===
Player	Team	Mat	Balls	Runs	Wkts	Avge	BBI	SR	5WI	10WM
Ben Hilfenhaus	Tasmania	11	3055	1523	60	25.38	7/79	50.9	3	
Andy Bichel	Queensland	9	1923	1110	45	24.66	7/54	42.7	1	
Ben Edmondson	Western Australia	10	1931	1228	41	29.95	6/28	47.0	1	1
Stuart MacGill	New South Wales	10	2504	1382	39	35.43	6/118	64.2	2	
Doug Bollinger	New South Wales	9	1816	1050	37	28.37	5/73	49.0	1	
