= William Walker (Australian cricketer) =

English-born Australian cricketer

Personal information
- Full name: William Holden Walker
- Born: 16 December 1835; Islington, London, England
- Died: 14 June 1886 (aged 50); Hobart, Tasmania, Australia
- Batting: Right-handed
- Bowling: Right-arm

Domestic team information
- Years: Team
- 1872/73–1877/78: Tasmania

Career statistics
Competition	First-class
Matches	2
Runs scored	73
Batting average	18.25
100s/50s	0/0
Top score	27
Balls bowled	213
Wickets	5
Bowling average	18.20
5 wickets in innings	0
10 wickets in match	0
Best bowling	3/20
Catches/stumpings	3/1
- Source: CricketArchive, 2 February 2016

William Holden Walker (16 December 1835 – 14 June 1886) was an English-born Australian cricketer. As captain of the Tasmanian cricket team, Walker was one of Tasmania's leading cricketers of his time. Known for his all-round capabilities, he was a right-handed batsman and an underarm bowler, as well as keeping wicket. Walker was named in the Cricket Tasmania Premier League's "Team of the Decade" for the decade spanning 1866–67 to 1875–76.

== Early life and professional career ==
Walker was born in Islington, London in 1835, the son of Holden and Mary Waldegrave Walker. During his early years in England, when Walker started playing cricket, his team came to be known as the Walker team. From England, Walker moved to Tasmania in 1859, and then to Launceston in 1862, where he became an employee of the soliciting firm Messrs Douglas & Collins. In 1866, he became the Council Clerk and Clerk of Petty Sessions for the town of Fingal. Subsequently, he was employed with solicitors Messrs Gill and Ball, Messrs Dobson and Mitchell and later became an accountant at Messrs Elliston and Featherstone.

== Cricketing career ==
Walker was a right-handed batsman and right-arm underarm bowler. One of Tasmania's leading cricketers of his time, his score of 60 in an 1860 North versus South Tasmania game set a record of being the highest individual score in such matches. In his profile of Walker for ESPNcricinfo, the sports writer Thomas Rose said: "He impressed in representative games and was often the shining light of a rather dismal Tasmanian side..."

After moving to Launceston, Walker made cricket famous in the city, captaining the Northern Tasmania cricket team. During the 1860s and 1870s, Walker also played for two clubs – Derwent and Wellington – under the then Tasmanian Cricket Association, standing out by scoring a century in one of his appearances.

Walker's first-class cricketing career spanned six years, from 1872 to 1878. He played two first-class cricket matches as captain of the Tasmanian cricket team during that period, scoring 73 runs and taking five wickets. During Cricket Tasmania's 150th anniversary celebrations, Walker was named as a member of the Cricket Tasmania Premier League's Team of the Decade for the decade 1866/67 – 1875/76 for having scored one of the only two centuries in Tasmania by any cricketer for the decade 1866 – 1875.

Walker took 60 wickets in the 1875–76 domestic season at an average of 8.47 runs per wicket, the best for all bowlers of the season. Walker was also a highly skilled wicket-keeper. Despite his all-round capabilities, Walker was best recognised and remembered for his impressive contributions as an inspirational captain, coming out as the best player in many matches irrespective of his team's performance.

== Death ==
At the age of 50, after suffering from a short illness, Walker died on 14 June 1886, at Pressland House, Hobart, Tasmania, with his funeral being held two days later. The Mercury wrote in its obituary on 15 June 1886: "Cricketers will learn with regret of the death, after a very short illness, of Mr. William Holden Walker, one of the oldest votaries of this thoroughly English game in the colony... Mr. Walker, who previous to his departure from England, was a member of the well-known Walker Team, brought cricketing into great prominence in Launceston... His efforts in the cause of cricket are so well known that they require no comment, but his sudden demise will cause a pang among the many friends who admired his genial and gentlemanly temperament."

Around a month after his death, on 13 July 1886, an amount of £590 from his estate was issued over as probate.
