= Bertie Brownlow =

Australian cricketer

Bertie Brownlow OAM
Personal information
- Full name: Bertie Brownlow
- Born: 20 May 1920; Portland, New South Wales, Australia
- Died: 22 October 2004 (aged 84); Hobart, Tasmania, Australia
- Batting: Left-handed
- Role: Wicket-keeper

Domestic team information
- Years: Team
- 1952/53–1956/57: Tasmania

Career statistics
Competition	FC
Matches	8
Runs scored	135
Batting average	10.38
100s/50s	0/0
Top score	46
Catches/stumpings	13/1
- Source: Cricinfo, 2 December 2008

Bertie Brownlow OAM (20 May 1920 – 22 October 2004) was a Tasmanian cricket player, who played first-class cricket for Tasmania eight times between the 1952–53 season and the 1956–57 season. He was an agile wicket-keeper.

Brownlow captained the Tasmanian side on two occasions in the 1956–57 season, but Tasmania lost both of those matches. Following his career as a player, Brownlow became a selector for the Tasmanian state side, and went on to serve as an administrator for the Tasmanian Cricket Association for many years, eventually serving as chairman.

In 1984 Brownlow was awarded the Medal of the Order of Australia for "service to sport, particularly cricket and hockey".

Bertie Brownlow died in his home in Hobart on 22 October 2004.

Preceded by Emerson Rodwell	Tasmanian First-class cricket captains 1956/57	Succeeded by Terence Cowley
