= Mark Ray =

Australian cricketer (born 1952)

Personal information
- Full name: Mark Ray
- Born: 2 October 1952 (age 74); Surry Hills, New South Wales, Australia
- Batting: Left-handed
- Bowling: Slow left-arm orthodox
- Role: All-rounder

Domestic team information
- Years: Team
- 1981–1982: New South Wales
- 1982–1986: Tasmania

Career statistics
Competition	First-class	List A
Matches	44	5
Runs scored	1948	93
Batting average	27.05	23.25
100s/50s	0/10	0/0
Top score	94	45
Balls bowled	4576	150
Wickets	41	2
Bowling average	49.65	64.50
5 wickets in innings	1	-
10 wickets in match	-	-
Best bowling	5/79	1/35
Catches/stumpings	41/–	0/–
- Source: cricinfo.com, 17 March 2008

Mark Ray (born 2 October 1952 in Surry Hills, New South Wales) is a former Australian first-class cricket player.

== Cricket career ==
Mark Ray played for New South Wales in the 1981–82 season, before moving to Tasmania, where he played for Tasmania from 1982-83 until he retired after the 1985–86 season. He also captained Tasmania on five occasions, becoming Tasmania's 40th captain.

A left-handed opening batsman, and slow left-arm orthodox bowler, he was a capable all-rounder, although his batting relied on a limited range of strokes and his bowling on accuracy and flight rather than spin. His highest first-class score was 94, for Tasmania against Western Australia in 1983–84. His best bowling figures were 5 for 79, for Tasmania against New South Wales in 1985–86, in his second-last match.

He later became a cricket author and journalist, working for many years at The Age in Melbourne.

== Books ==
- Geoff Lawson's Diary of the Ashes: As Told to Mark Ray 1990
- The Ashes: England in Australia 1990-91 (with Alan Lee) 1991
- Cricket: The Game Behind the Game 1994
- Border & Beyond 1995
- Shane Warne: My Own Story: As Told to Mark Ray (with Shane Warne) 1997
- Cricket Masala 2002
- Long Shadows: 100 Years of Australian Cricket 2006 (editor)

== See also ==
- List of Tasmanian representative cricketers
- List of New South Wales representative cricketers
