= Rex Davidson =

Australian cricketer (1927–2017)

Thomas Davidson
Personal information
- Full name: Thomas Rex Davidson
- Born: 30 July 1927; Campbell Town, Tasmania, Australia
- Died: 11 January 2017 (aged 89)
- Batting: Right-handed
- Role: Wicket-keeper

Domestic team information
- Years: Team
- 1949/50–1955/56: Tasmania

Career statistics
Competition	FC
Matches	13
Runs scored	509
Batting average	21.20
100s/50s	0/4
Top score	71
Catches/stumpings	12/4
- Source: CricInfo, 4 December 2008

Thomas Rex Davidson (30 July 1927 – 11 January 2017) was a Tasmanian cricketer. He played first class cricket for Tasmania twelve times between the 1949–1950 season and the 1955–1956 season. He and Bertie Brownlow alternated in that period as the side's wicket-keeper. Brownlow was preferred for his skills behind the stumps, whereas Davidson proved to be the better batsman of the two, contributing to the lower order with scores of over 50 on four occasions. Davidson filled in as captain of the side for two games in the 1952–1953 season, due to the absence through injury of then permanent captain Emerson Rodwell, but Tasmania lost both games under his captaincy.
