= Westbury Cricket Club =

Westbury Shamrocks Cricket Club
- Nickname: Shamrocks
- Sport: Cricket
- Association: Cricket North
- League: Cricket North, Greater Northern Cup
- Home ground: Ingamells Oval
- Colours: Maroon, Green and Gold
- President: Matthew Allen
- Head coach: Chathura Athukorala
- Captain: Joel Lloyd

Westbury Cricket Club, also known as Westbury Shamrocks, is a cricket team which represents Westbury, Tasmania in the Northern Tasmanian Cricket Association grade cricket competition, in the Australian state of Tasmania.

== Honours ==
- NTCA Premierships

== See also ==
- Cricket Tasmania
