= William Brown (Tasmanian cricketer) =

Tasmanian cricketer

Personal information
- Born: 1807; England
- Died: 28 August 1859; Hobart, Tasmania, Australia
- Role: Bowler (underarm)

Domestic team information
- Years: Team
- 1852: Tasmania

Career statistics
Competition	First-class
Matches	1
Runs scored	7
Batting average	3.50
100s/50s
Top score	7
Balls bowled
Wickets	15
Bowling average	4.86
5 wickets in innings	2
10 wickets in match	1
Best bowling	8/31
Catches/stumpings	4
- Source: CricketArchive, 4 February 2013

William Brown (1807 – 28 August 1859) was an English-born cricket player, who emigrated to Australia and played a first-class cricket game for Tasmania. He only played one first-class game in his career, on 4 March 1858, where he had the honour of captaining the team for that match. He had stepped in to replace the previous captain Robert Still in the second game of a two-match series against Victoria, played at the TCA Ground in Hobart.

He lost the toss and was obliged to bowl first, as the Victorian captain, Tom Wills, chose to bat. Brown decided to open the bowling himself, and made an immediate impact. In a devastating opening spell, Brown's lightning fast under arm bowling ripped through the Victorian order virtually unassisted, giving him first innings figures of 7 for 42 off 13 overs. His excellent figures had Victoria scuttled out for a paltry 78 off 26 overs. Despite the excellent bowling effort, Tasmania's batsmen, including Brown who made only 7, could not support the bowlers, and were also skittled, all out for 51, with John Tabart top scoring on 8. Brown again excelled at bowling in Victoria's second innings, taking 8 for 31 including two caught and bowled. Victoria had been dismissed for 67 off 20 overs, leaving Tasmania with a victory target of 95. Once again though, the Victorians demolished Tasmania's batting line-up, bowling the hosts out for just 25, with Brown out for a duck. Despite taking astonishing match figures of 15 for 73, as well as 4 catches, it was to be the only first-class match Brown would ever play.

Brown's figures of 8 for 31 would remain the best in first-class cricket for a bowler for Tasmania, until Sam Rainbird took eight wickets for 21 runs against Queensland in the 2021–22 Sheffield Shield season in March 2022.

William Brown died on 28 August 1859 in Hobart, Tasmania, aged 52 years.

== See also ==
- List of Tasmanian representative cricketers
