= Keith Bradshaw (cricketer) =

Australian cricketer (1963–2021)

Personal information
- Full name: Keith Bradshaw
- Born: 2 October 1963; Hobart, Tasmania, Australia
- Died: 8 November 2021 (aged 58); Adelaide, South Australia
- Batting: Right-handed
- Bowling: Right-arm medium

Domestic team information
- Years: Team
- 1984/85–1987/88: Tasmania

Career statistics
Competition	First-class	List A
Matches	25	9
Runs scored	1,083	180
Batting average	25.78	20.00
100s/50s	2/4	0/0
Top score	121	43
Balls bowled	738	150
Wickets	9	4
Bowling average	48.77	33.50
5 wickets in innings	0	0
10 wickets in match	0	0
Best bowling	3/81	1/15
Catches/stumpings	12/–	7/–
- Source: CricketArchive, 8 December 2022

Keith Bradshaw (2 October 1963 – 8 November 2021) was an Australian cricketer, accountant and administrator.

== Career ==
Bradshaw was a right-handed batsman who played in 25 first-class and nine List A limited-over matches for Tasmania between 1984–85 and 1987-88 without fulfilling his early promise. In his fifth match, he scored 121 against Queensland. He represented Sussex in 1986 at Second XI and Under-25 level, without breaking into the 1st XI. He lost his place in the Tasmanian team during the 1986–87 season and retired after making a final appearance during the following season. He deputised for the State Captain David Boon, during his absence, while on international duty. He returned to the University of Tasmania to complete his studies in 1988. Upon qualifying as an accountant, he forged a successful business career with Price Waterhouse and Deloitte rising to be a Partner.

In 2001, after a brief hiatus from competitive cricket, he made a final comeback with the Derwent Cricket Club in the Southern Tasmanian Cricket League, which lasted until the 2005–06 season.

He was appointed the Secretary & Chief Executive by the Marylebone Cricket Club on 30 January 2006, succeeding the retiring Roger Knight in October 2006. As Chief Executive of the MCC Bradshaw had a place on the administrative board of the England and Wales Cricket Board. It was reported that he was involved in the removal from office of England Head Coach Duncan Fletcher in April 2007. The MCC accepted his resignation as Secretary in August 2011. Bradshaw was awarded Honorary Life Membership.

In November 2011, it was announced that the South Australian Cricket Association had appointed Bradshaw as its next CEO.

== Death ==
Bradshaw died from multiple myeloma on 8 November 2021. He was 58 years old.

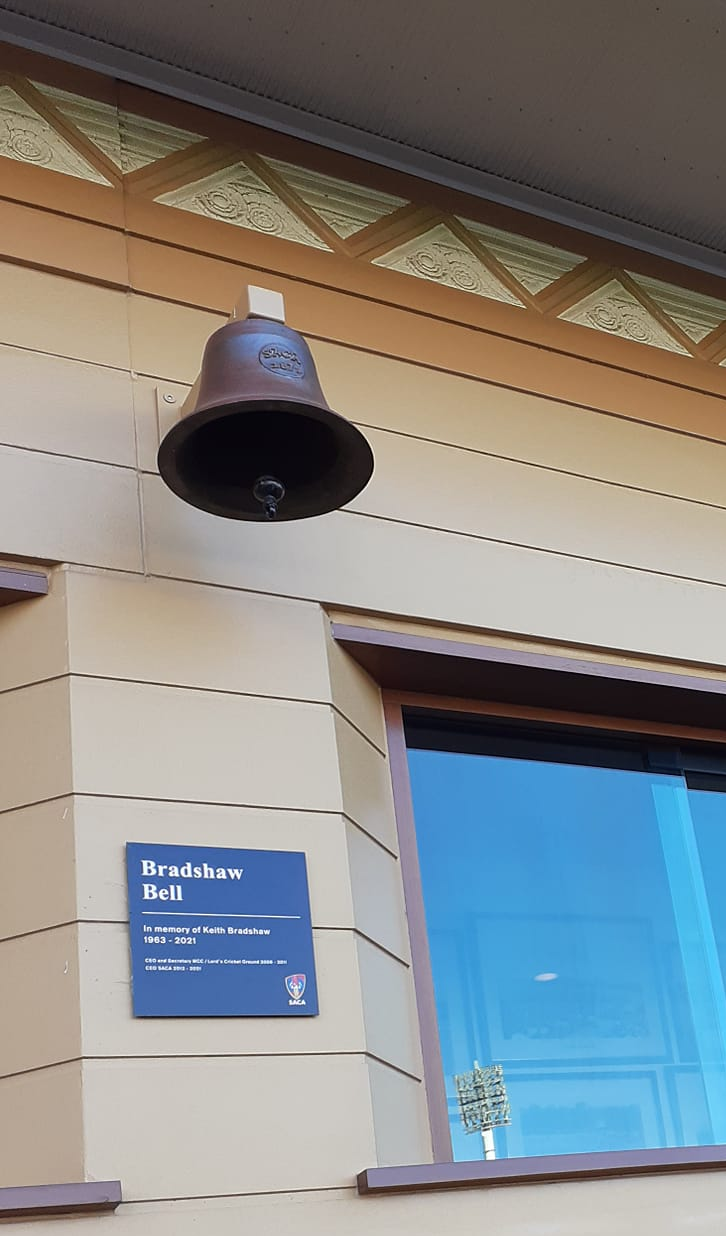
The Bradshaw Bell at Adelaide Oval

The Bradman Pavilion at Adelaide Oval houses the Bradshaw Bell, named after Keith. This bell is rung at the start of each day's play in a Test match.
