= Roger Woolley =

Australian cricketer

Personal information
- Full name: Roger Douglas Woolley
- Born: 16 September 1954 (age 72); Hobart, Tasmania, Australia
- Batting: Right-handed
- Role: Wicket-keeper

International information
- National side: Australia
- Test debut (cap 319): 22 April 1983 v Sri Lanka
- Last Test: 7 April 1984 v West Indies
- ODI debut (cap 77): 13 April 1983 v Sri Lanka
- Last ODI: 30 April 1983 v Sri Lanka

Domestic team information
- Years: Team
- 1977/78–1987/88: Tasmania

Career statistics
Competition	Test	ODI	FC	LA
Matches	2	4	85	29
Runs scored	21	31	4,781	526
Batting average	10.50	31.00	40.17	25.04
100s/50s	0/0	0/0	7/30	0/2
Top score	13	16*	144	80*
Balls bowled	–	–	76	–
Wickets	–	–	0	–
Bowling average	–	–	–	–
5 wickets in innings	–	–	–	–
10 wickets in match	–	–	–	–
Best bowling	–	–	–	–
Catches/stumpings	7/0	1/1	145/16	20/2
- Source: CricInfo, 2 December 2008

Roger Douglas Woolley (born 16 September 1954) is a former Australian cricketer who played in two Test matches and four One Day Internationals (ODIs) between 1983 and 1984. He was a middle-order batsman, and later a wicket-keeper. He was a member of the Tasmanian team that won their first domestic title in the 1978/79 Gillette Cup.

== Early career ==
From a cricketing family, Woolley attended New Town High School in Hobart and played league cricket in England with Great Harwood Cricket Club in the Ribblesdale League. Woolley made his first-class debut in Tasmania's initial Sheffield Shield season, 1977–78. After he missed Tasmania's first two games, which they lost easily, Woolley was selected as a middle-order batsman, and scored 49, 55, 103, one, 29 and 32 not out, helping Tasmania draw all three games. Of his century, Wisden said: "23-year-old Hobart insurance broker Roger Woolley confirmed earlier promise by hitting a delightful 103 in two and three-quarter hours. Displaying a fine array of cuts and drives, and a mature choice of the right ball to hit, he became the first Tasmanian-born player to score a Shield century for his home state." In his third match Woolley also kept wicket, taking four catches and a stumping and conceding only three byes.

Woolley remained Tasmania's keeper until the 1985–86 season, except when a knee injury forced him to miss most of the 1980–81 season. In 1978–79, against Western Australia in Devonport, Tasmania were chasing 357 for victory and had lost 6 for 187 when the captain, Jack Simmons, joined Woolley and they put on an unbroken seventh-wicket partnership of 172 to give Tasmania their first victory in the Shield; Woolley finished on 99 not out.

== Playing for Australia ==
Woolley proved to be a good wicket-keeper, and had his career not paralleled that of Rod Marsh he probably would have played more international cricket. In the 1982–83 season Woolley scored 551 runs at 42.38 and took 39 catches and two stumpings, and he got his chance for Australia when Marsh was unavailable for the brief tour of Sri Lanka in April 1983. He played in all four one-day matches and the single Test, becoming Tasmania's first Test player since its entry to the Sheffield Shield. Australia so dominated the Test match in Kandy that he was not needed to bat, but he took five catches in the innings victory.

He was selected for the tour of the West Indies in 1983–84 as deputy keeper to Wayne Phillips. He played only the Fourth Test in St John's, keeping wickets when Phillips opened the innings, but he scored only 13 and 8 in an innings defeat for Australia. At the time the Australian journalist Peter McFarline said his wicketkeeping "generally was again a long way short of the standard necessary."

== Later career ==
He had his most successful season with the bat in 1984–85, scoring 717 runs at 51.21, including his highest first-class score of 144 (and 61 in the second innings) against Western Australia in Perth. But, captaining a Tasmanian team that won none of its ten matches and finished last in the Shield, the quality of Woolley's keeping deteriorated. John MacKinnon in Wisden noted that "his wicket-keeping was erratic and his captaincy was inhibited by lack of confidence in his team". He played the rest of his career as a batsman, retiring after two matches in 1987–88.

Woolley was captain of the Tasmanian one-day team from 1982–83 until 1985–86, and although he also captained the first-class team on 28 occasions, he was never officially appointed as Tasmanian captain.

He later made his career in real estate. He regularly provides comments on ABC radio broadcasts of matches in Tasmania.

== Sources ==
- Findlay, R. (ed.) Tasmanian Cricket Yearbook 1983-84, Tasmanian Cricket Association: Hobart.

Preceded by Brian Davison	Tasmanian One-day cricket captains 1982/83–85/86	Succeeded by David Boon
