= Llewellyn Thomas (Australian cricketer) =

Australian cricketer

Personal information
- Born: 1 April 1883; Melbourne, Australia
- Died: 2 November 1962 (aged 79); Evandale, Tasmania, Australia

Domestic team information
- Years: Team
- 1910-1922: Tasmania
- Source: Cricinfo, 20 January 2016

Llewellyn Thomas (1 April 1883 – 2 November 1962) was an Australian cricketer. He played seven first-class matches for Tasmania between 1910 and 1922.

== See also ==
- List of Tasmanian representative cricketers
