= Michael Sellers (cricketer) =

Australian cricketer (born 1952)

Personal information
- Born: 5 July 1952 (age 74); Launceston, Tasmania, Australia

Domestic team information
- Years: Team
- 1975-1977: Tasmania
- Source: Cricinfo, 14 March 2016

Michael Sellers (born 5 July 1952) is an Australian former cricketer. He played two first-class matches for Tasmania between 1975 and 1977.

== See also ==
- List of Tasmanian representative cricketers
