= Ernest Harrison (cricketer) =

Australian cricketer

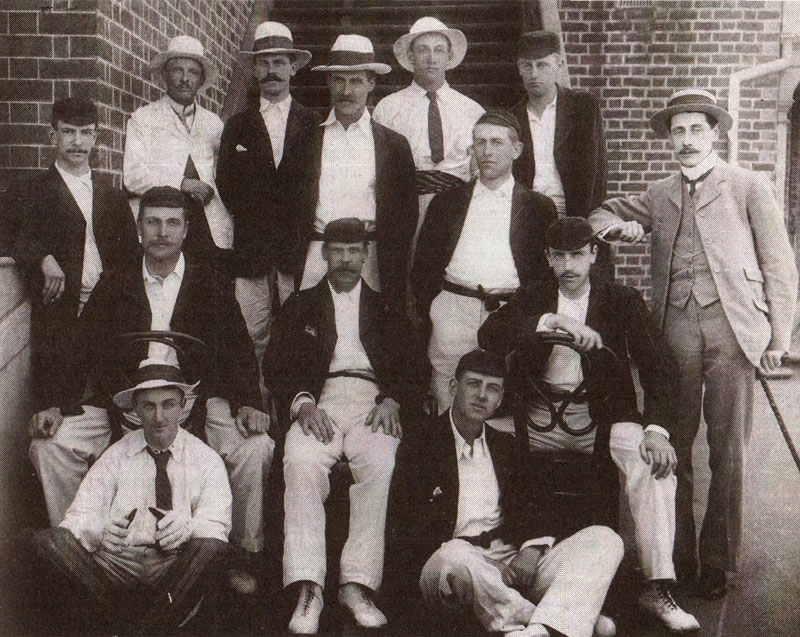
- The Tasmanian cricket team that beat Victoria at the MCG in 1902-03. Ernest Harrison is standing third from left.

Personal information
- Full name: Ernest Weedon Harrison
- Born: 22 July 1874; Campbell Town, Tasmania, Australia
- Died: 14 November 1968 (aged 94); New Norfolk, Tasmania, Australia
- Batting: Right-handed

Domestic team information
- Years: Team
- 1902-1911: Tasmania

Career statistics
Competition	First-class
Matches	10
Runs scored	376
Batting average	22.11
100s/50s	0/3
Top score	97
Balls bowled
Wickets	0
Bowling average	–
5 wickets in innings	0
10 wickets in match	0
Best bowling	–
Catches/stumpings	10/–
- Source: Cricinfo, 17 August 2020

Ernest Harrison (22 July 1874 – 14 November 1968) was an Australian cricketer. He played ten first-class matches for Tasmania between 1902 and 1911.

Harrison served overseas with the 15 Infantry Battalion of the Australian Army in World War I.

== See also ==
- List of Tasmanian representative cricketers
