= Kenneth Burn =

Australian cricketer

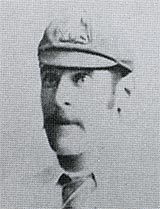
- Kenny Burn on the 1890 tour of England

Personal information
- Full name: Edwin James Kenneth Burn
- Born: 17 September 1862; Richmond, Tasmania
- Died: 20 July 1956 (aged 93); Hobart, Tasmania
- Batting: Right-handed
- Bowling: Right arm medium
- Role: All-rounder

International information
- National side: Australia
- Test debut (cap 56): 21 July 1890 v England
- Last Test: 11 August 1890 v England

Domestic team information
- Years: Team
- 1883/84–1909/10: Tasmania

Career statistics
Competition	Test	FC
Matches	2	48
Runs scored	41	1,750
Batting average	10.25	21.60
100s/50s	0/0	2/5
Top score	19	119
Balls bowled	–
Wickets	–	14
Bowling average	–	22.85
5 wickets in innings	–	0
10 wickets in match	–	0
Best bowling	–	3/15
Catches/stumpings	0/–	31/–
- Source: Cricinfo, 2 December 2008

Edwin James Kenneth Burn (17 September 1862 – 20 July 1956) was an Australian cricketer who played in two Tests on the tour to England in 1890. Although unsuccessful at Test level, Burn is best known for being one of the most prolific batsmen in Tasmania at club level in the nineteenth century.

== Club career ==
Burn was a prolific batsman in Tasmanian cricket for many years, playing first for his hometown side Richmond Cricket Club, and then the higher profile Wellington Cricket Club. He hit 41 centuries in all grades of cricket, two of them over 350 runs, and six of them in consecutive innings in the 1895–96 season. Without peer, he was undoubtedly Tasmania's best batsman of the 1890s at club and first-class level, leading the Tasmanian Grade Cricket batting averages on 11 occasions throughout his career. He also set two long-standing Australian club cricket records by scoring 1,200 runs at an average of 133.00 in the 1889–1900 season, and in scoring 123 not out and 213 not out for Wellington against Break O'Day in 1895–96, he became the first man to score a century and double century in the same match in Australia. By the time of his retirement from club cricket, Burn had amassed 12,163 runs, which is still the second highest total in the competition's history. Only Ronald Morrisby who made 16,000 runs in the 1950s has a higher total. Burn also took 362 wickets in his club career.

== First-class career ==
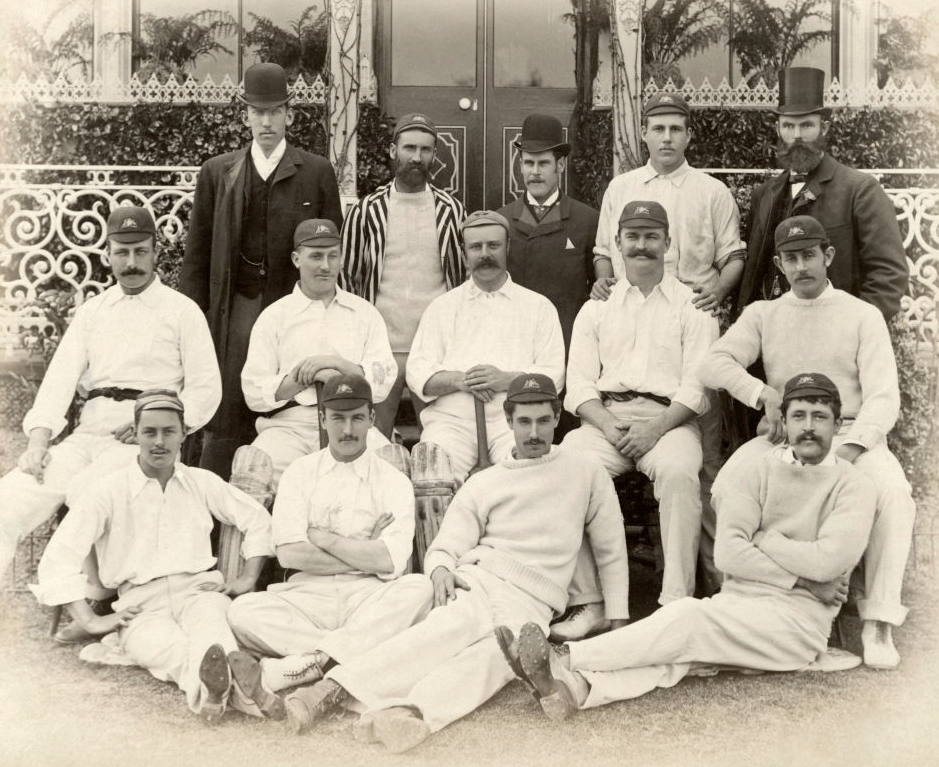
Burn back row middle pictured with the 1890 Australia national cricket team

In his first-class cricket career, which lasted from the 1883–84 season through to 1909–10, he made two centuries, with 119 the higher. He also managed to take 14 wickets at the respectable average of 22.85 with his right-arm medium pace bowling. Burn was also Tasmania's first successful first-class captain, leading the team to six victories in the 14 first-class matches that he led them for. His win percentage as captain of 42.85% has never been bettered.

== Test career ==
Burn's selection for the Australian touring party in 1890 bordered on the farcical: he was picked as a wicket-keeper in what Wisden termed "the one serious mistake in making up the side". Only after he had joined the team on the ship to England did he admit that he had never kept wicket.

Burn played in the first two Tests on the tour, both of them lost. In the first, he batted at No 10 and No 11; in the second, he was promoted to No 6 in the first innings and opened in the second innings. In all, he scored 41 runs.

At the time of his death at the age of 93 years and 307 days, Burn was the oldest living Test cricketer. His obituary in the 1957 Wisden calls him "Kenneth Edward Burn". The Lower Domain Road gates at Hobart's TCA Ground are named the K. E. Burn Memorial Gates in his honour.

Preceded by Norman Rock	Tasmanian first-class cricket captain 1893/94–1909/10	Succeeded by Reginald Hawson
Preceded by Reginald Allen	Oldest living Test cricketer 2 May 1952 – 20 July 1956	Succeeded by Harry Donnan
