= William Ward (Australian cricketer) =

Australian cricketer

Personal information
- Born: 15 May 1863; Hobart, Tasmania, Australia
- Died: 22 June 1948 (aged 85); East Malvern, Victoria, Australia

Domestic team information
- Years: Team
- 1897-1907: Tasmania
- Source: Cricinfo, 16 January 2016

William Ward (15 May 1863 – 22 June 1948) was an Australian cricketer. He played four first-class matches for Tasmania between 1897 and 1907.

== See also ==
- List of Tasmanian representative cricketers
