= Robert Still (cricketer) =

Australian cricketer

Personal information
- Full name: Robert Stuart Still
- Born: 15 March 1822; Bathurst, New South Wales, Australia
- Died: 5 July 1907 (aged 85); Launceston, Tasmania, Australia
- Bowling: Roundarm right-arm fast
- Relatives: William Still (brother)

Domestic team information
- Years: Team
- 1853/54–1857/58: Tasmania

Career statistics
Competition	FC
Matches	2
Runs scored	49
Batting average	16.33
100s/50s	–/–
Top score	23*
Balls bowled	132
Wickets	10
Bowling average	6.80
5 wickets in innings	–
10 wickets in match	–
Best bowling	4/23
Catches/stumpings	–/–
- Source: Cricinfo, 4 January 2011

Robert Stuart Still (15 March 1822 – 5 July 1907) was an Australian cricketer, who played two first-class cricket games for Tasmania, and had the honour of captaining the team on one of those occasions.

Still was born in Bathurst, New South Wales. A tall round arm bowler who could generate movement off the pitch, he proved an effective opening bowler. In his first match against Victoria, he opened the bowling, taking 4/23 off 11 overs, and in the second innings, he combined with opening partner, Robert McDowall to skittle out the Victorians for a paltry 50 off 18 overs. Still claimed 3/24 off 9 overs, and McDowall took 5/23 off 9. Between the two, they claimed 15 wickets to set up an 8 wickets victory for the Tasmanians.

He did not play another game for Tasmania until the 1857–58 season, when he was recalled to face the Victorians again. Tasmania were demolished for 33 on a damp green pitch, with Gideon Elliott taking an astonishing 9/2 off 19 overs. The Victorians replied with 115, Still claiming 3/21 off his 18 overs. Tasmania was again bundled out, this time for a slightly better 62, but it handed Victoria victory by an innings and 20 runs, with Still not required to bowl in a second innings, his first class career had ended.

Robert Still died in Launceston, Tasmania at the age of 85 years.

== See also ==
- List of Tasmanian representative cricketers
