= Rex Bennett =

Australian cricketer

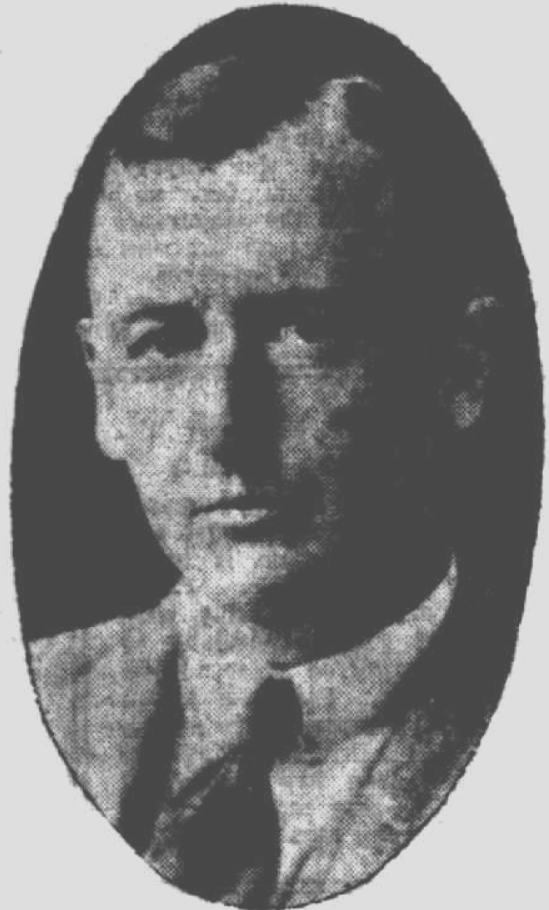

Personal information
- Full name: Rex Leland Bennett
- Born: 25 June 1896; Snowtown, South Australia
- Died: 14 December 1963 (aged 67); Sydney, New South Wales
- Batting: Right-handed
- Role: Wicket-keeper

Domestic team information
- Years: Team
- 1922/23: South Australia
- 1924/25-1925/26: Tasmania

Career statistics
Competition	First-class
Matches	8
Runs scored	163
Batting average	12.53
100s/50s	0/0
Top score	38
Catches/stumpings	9/7
- Source: Cricinfo, 24 January 2016

Rex Leland Bennett (25 June 1896 – 14 December 1963) was an Australian cricketer. He played five first-class matches for South Australia between 1922 and 1923 and three for Tasmania between 1924 and 1926.
