= Sean Clingeleffer =

Australian cricket player

Personal information
- Full name: Sean Geoffrey Clingeleffer
- Born: 9 May 1980 (age 46); Hobart, Tasmania, Australia
- Nickname: Clinger
- Height: 1.82 m (6 ft 0 in)
- Batting: Left-handed
- Role: Wicketkeeper

Domestic team information
- Years: Team
- 2000/01–2007/08: Tasmania

Career statistics
Competition	First-class	List A
Matches	74	40
Runs scored	2,708	362
Batting average	26.54	22.62
100s/50s	3/13	0/0
Top score	141*	48
Catches/stumpings	220/12	39/3
- Source: CricInfo, 18 July 2020

Sean Geoffrey Clingeleffer (born 9 May 1980) is an Australian former cricketer who played for Tasmania. He plays his club cricket for North Hobart Cricket Club.

After eight seasons with Tasmania and being a major part of their success in the Pura Cup Final in 2006–07 – scoring a century – he was dropped in 2007/08 after scoring 103 runs in five matches and subsequently not offered a contract for the 2008/09 season.
