= Rod Tucker =

Australian cricket umpire (born 1964)

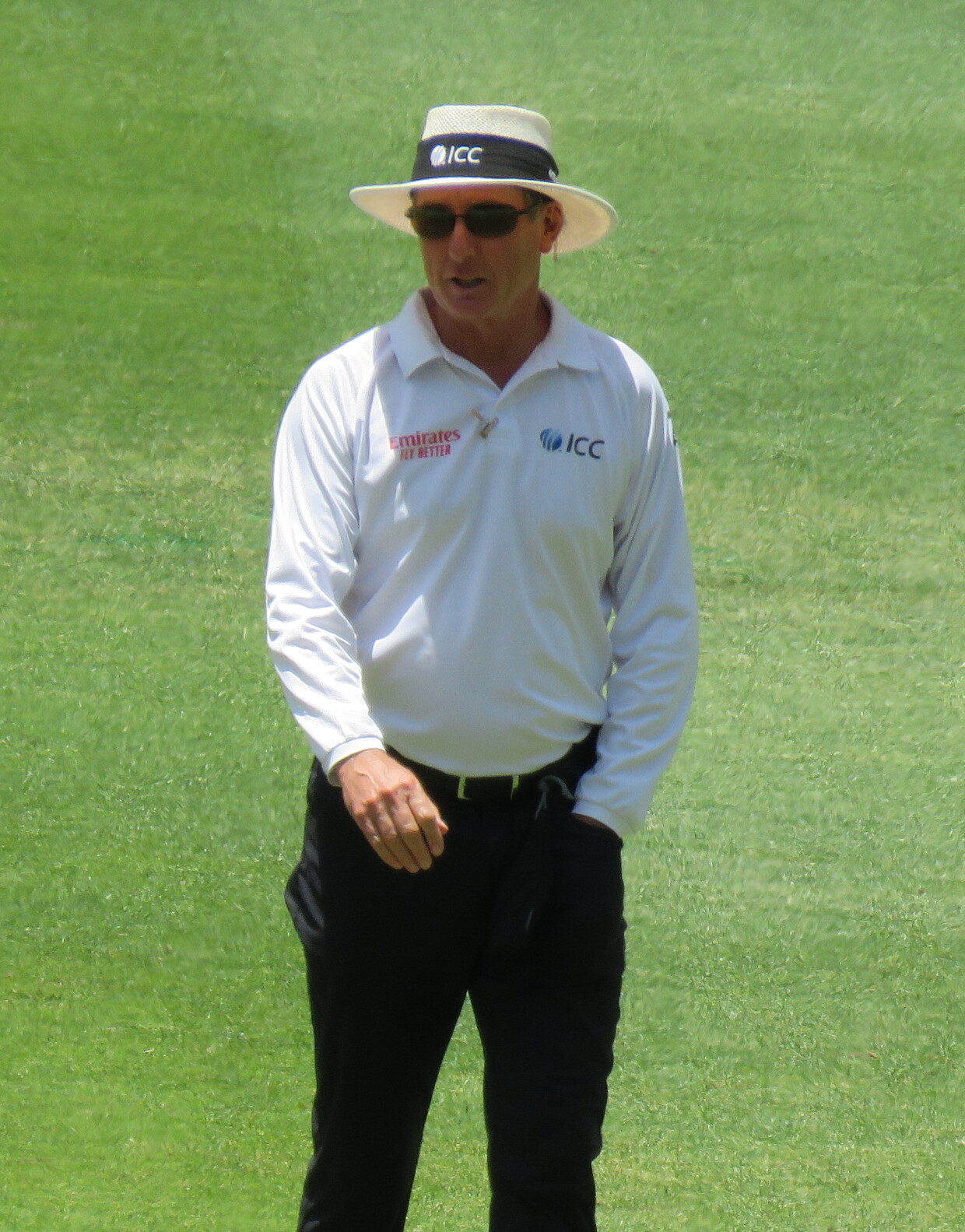
- Tucker in 2022

Personal information
- Full name: Rodney James Tucker
- Born: 28 August 1964 (age 62); Auburn, New South Wales, Australia
- Batting: Left-handed
- Bowling: Right-arm fast-medium
- Role: All-rounder
- Relatives: Darren Tucker (brother)

Domestic team information
- Years: Team
- 1985/86–1987/88: New South Wales
- 1988/89–1998/99: Tasmania
- 1999/00: Canberra

Umpiring information
- Tests umpired: 100 (2010–2025)
- ODIs umpired: 110 (2009–2026)
- T20Is umpired: 66 (2009–2026)
- WTests umpired: 1 (2008)
- WODIs umpired: 6 (2004–2008)
- WT20Is umpired: 5 (2010)

Career statistics
Competition	FC	LA
Matches	103	65
Runs scored	5,076	1,255
Batting average	36.25	24.13
100s/50s	7/28	0/7
Top score	165	85
Balls bowled	10,050	2,492
Wickets	123	69
Bowling average	41.40	28.72
5 wickets in innings	0	0
10 wickets in match	0	0
Best bowling	4/56	4/30
Catches/stumpings	69/–	20/–
- Source: Cricinfo, 23 November 2023

Rodney James Tucker (born 28 August 1964) is an Australian cricket umpire, member of the ICC Elite Umpire Panel and officiates in international Tests, ODIs and T20Is. He was a cricketer who played briefly for New South Wales from 1985/86 to 1987/88, before moving to Tasmania where he played from 1987/88 to 1998/99. He was also vice-captain of Tasmania from 1991/92 until 1995/96. He briefly played as Captain/Coach for the Canberra Comets in the 1999/2000 season before retiring from cricket as a player.

== Playing career ==
A left-handed batsman, Tucker scored 5,076 first-class runs at an average of 36.25, and took 123 first-class wickets at an average of 41.40, bowling right-arm medium. He played in Tasmania's sides that were runners-up in the Sheffield Shield in 1993–94 and 1997–98.

== Umpiring career ==
After his playing career, Tucker took to umpiring. He was appointed to the ICC International Panel of Umpires in 2008 and was quickly promoted to the ICC Elite Umpire Panel in 2010. He was one of the 20 umpires to stand in matches during the 2015 Cricket World Cup. Tucker stood in the 1st semi-final of the tournament, played between South Africa and New Zealand on 24 March 2015 at Auckland. He stood in the final of the 2016 ICC World Twenty20. On 2 January 2017, he stood in his 50th Test, when umpiring the second Test between South Africa and Sri Lanka at Newlands Cricket Ground. On 4 June 2026, he stood in his 100th Test, when umpiring the first Test at Lord's, the ICC having adjusted his roster so that he would reached the landmark at the home of cricket.

In April 2019, he was named as one of the sixteen umpires for the 2019 Cricket World Cup. In September 2023, he was named as one of the sixteen match officials for 2023 Cricket World Cup. He stood as an on-field umpire in 6 group stage matches and in a semi-final match.

== See also ==
- List of Test cricket umpires
- List of One Day International cricket umpires
- List of Twenty20 International cricket umpires

Preceded by Dirk Wellham	Tasmanian First-class cricket captains 1991/92-94/95	Succeeded by Jamie Cox
Preceded by Dirk Wellham	Tasmanian One-day cricket captains 1992/93-95/96	Succeeded by Jamie Cox
