= Emerson Rodwell =

Australian soldier, cricketer and commentator

Personal information
- Full name: Edwin Emerson Rodwell
- Born: 12 April 1921; Glenorchy, Tasmania, Australia
- Died: 27 February 2011 (aged 89)
- Batting: Right-handed
- Bowling: Right-arm medium
- Role: All-rounder

Domestic team information
- Years: Team
- 1947-48–1955-56: Tasmania

Career statistics
Competition	FC
Matches	18
Runs scored	709
Batting average	20.85
100s/50s	1/3
Top score	104
Balls bowled	569
Wickets	8
Bowling average	42.12
5 wickets in innings	0
10 wickets in match	0
Best bowling	3/67
Catches/stumpings	19/-
- Source: ESPNcricinfo, 4 March 2011

Edwin Emerson Rodwell, MM (12 April 1921 – 27 February 2011) was an Australian soldier, cricket player, umpire, commentator and administrator. He fought in World War II, in New Guinea, and Borneo, and was awarded the Military Medal. Rodwell was an opening batsman and a prolific run-scorer at club level, and represented Tasmania on 15 occasions at first-class level, captaining the side five times between 1950 and 1951 and 1955–56. He also played three times for a first-class "Tasmania Combined XI". During his captaincy Tasmania won their first first-class match after a winless period of over 20 years, making him the first successful Tasmanian captain since Jim Atkinson in the early 1930s.

== Early life ==
Born in Glenorchy, Tasmania, Emerson Rodwell attended The Hutchins School in Hobart and showed an early talent as an athlete. He was a promising Australian rules football player, who regularly represented Hutchins in the Old Scholars Football Association (OSFA), but his true talent lay in cricket.

By the age of 15 he had made his senior debut for his local side, Glenorchy Cricket Club in the Tasmanian Grade Cricket competition, and was at ease batting against adults at that young age.

He played as an aggressive opening batsman, and enjoyed attacking opening bowlers. By the age of 17 his name was already being discussed amongst state selectors, when his career was interrupted due to the suspension of all grade cricket following the outbreak of World War II.

== Military career ==
Emerson Rodwell enlisted in the Australian Army in 1940, after turning old enough to do so. He was attached to the 2/24th Battalion of the 26th Brigade, and infantry brigade of the 9th Division. Although the 9th Division had initially served in North Africa, including at the Siege of Tobruk, Rodwell never served in Europe or North Africa. Rodwell's service throughout the war was in the South West Pacific theatre of World War II.

He initially fought in New Guinea until 1943, and then in 1945 his Battalion went on to Borneo, where they played a vital part in the allied victory. During the Battle of Tarakan Rodwell was recommended for the Military Medal for his bravery in attacking enemy positions. The award was made for his actions during the attack on the "Wills feature". He was a Bren gunner with 1 section, 16 platoon, D Company 2/24th when his section commander was killed. Despite the fact it was his first time in action, Rodwell took command of the remaining members of the section, then placed himself in full view of the main loophole of a Japanese-held concrete pillbox, and fired his Bren gun at the loophole to give another member of his platoon chance to knock out the pillbox with a flamethrower. The award was gazetted on 3 July 1945.

He was discharged from the Army in November 1946, having obtained the rank of Warrant Officer Class 2.

== First-class career ==
Despite the interruption of more than six years to his cricketing career due to the war, Rodwell returned to Glenorchy Cricket Club after being demobbed, and set about where he had left off by terrorising the competition in the 1946–47 season. He immediately caught the attention of the state selectors, who finally gave him his long-awaited first-class debut against Victoria at the Melbourne Cricket Ground in January 1948. On debut he made 14 and 23, but performed much better with the ball, taking 3/67 in the first innings, but not getting to bowl in the second, as Victoria won by 10 wickets within 9 overs.

Rodwell made the only first-class century of his career on 25 January 1950. Going into the second day of a three-day game against Victoria, the Tasmanians were trailing by 12 runs on the first innings. They began their second innings with an excellent partnership between Ronald Thomas and Rodwell, taking the score past 100 without loss. Thomas soon departed, but Rodwell was in the finest form of his career, soon passing 100 himself. However, once he reached the milestone, he was dismissed soon after for 104, caught behind by Bert Wright off the bowling of Bernard Considine. His century had given Tasmania a lead of 297, but Victoria chased down the runs, winning by 4 wickets.

By 1950 Rodwell had been appointed as state captain, and enjoyed reasonable success, winning one and drawing two of the five matches he led the side for. It was an astute piece of captaincy on the part of Rodwell that led to the victory. After winning the toss and putting Victoria in to bat first, Tasmania skittled the Victorians for 119, setting up the victory.

In 1956, Rodwell, at the age of 35 decided to retire from first-class cricket having scored 709 runs and taken 8 wickets in 18 matches, and then returned to concentrating on his career at Glenorchy Cricket Club.

== Tasmanian grade cricket career ==
Rodwell was one of the premier club cricket players of the immediate post-war period in Tasmania. He dominated the Tasmanian Grade Cricket competition as both a batsman and as a captain. Playing as an aggressive opening batsman for his beloved Glenorchy Cricket Club, whom he represented for his whole club career, Rodwell amassed 11,542 first grade runs from 337 innings at an average of 38.47. He also had the competition's highest season average on six occasions, and was the leading run-scorer five times. During the 1949–50 season he compiled 1071 runs for the season, still the competition's second highest tally behind Ronald Morrisby who made 1099 runs in 1950–51.

His club career total of 11,542 is the third highest total in the competition's history behind Ronald Morrisby who made a remarkable 16,000 runs exactly, and Kenneth Burn who made 12,100 runs in his career. In the 1950–51 season Rodwell made his highest score of 215 against Kingborough Cricket Club at their home ground of Kingston Beach Oval.

Rodwell's prolific run-scoring as an opening batsman leads people to forget he was a talented all-rounder. Although only a medium pace bowler, he was able to move the ball quite dramatically off the pitch, and claimed 331 wickets during his club career. He also once claimed a wicket with a legitimate underarm delivery, as he had realised the technique had not been outlawed in the Tasmanian Grade Cricket Competition. His career best return was 7/44.

Rodwell was equally effective as Glenorchy's club captain. During his captaincy, the club dominated the TCA competition, winning seven titles, and being runner-up three times. They won the competition every season of the 1950s except for two (1954–55 and 1958–59). In all, Glenorchy won eight of their 14 TCA First Grade titles during his time as a player with the club. Rodwell's eight titles is still the most by a single player in TCA history.

== Later life ==
By the time he finished his playing career, Rodwell was already a life member of Glenorchy Cricket Club, where he continued to work as a club administrator, as well as the club's representative on the Tasmanian Cricket Association. He also worked as a delegate on several TCA sub-committees, and was made Chairman of the Umpire Appointment Board.

By the 1960s Rodwell was commentating on local cricket on 936 ABC local radio, where he quickly became a well known and recognised local celebrity for his expert and colourful analysis of the competition.

The Emerson Rodwell Medal, named in his honour in 2007 is awarded annually to the TCA Best and Fairest Player, in the Tasmanian Grade Cricket Competition. He died on 27 February 2011.

== See also ==
- List of Tasmanian representative cricketers

Preceded by Ronald Morrisby	Tasmanian First-class cricket captains 1950/51-55/56	Succeeded by Bertie Brownlow
