= Michael Di Venuto =

Australian cricketer (born 1973)

Personal information
- Full name: Michael James Di Venuto
- Born: 12 December 1973 (age 52); Hobart, Tasmania, Australia
- Nickname: Diva
- Batting: Left-handed
- Bowling: Right-arm medium Right arm leg break
- Role: Batsman, Coach

International information
- National sides: Australia (1997); Italy
- ODI debut (cap 133): 29 March 1997; Australia v South Africa
- Last ODI: 17 December 1997; Australia v New Zealand

Domestic team information
- Years: Team
- 1991/92–2007/08: Tasmania (squad no. 5)
- 1999: Sussex
- 2000–2006: Derbyshire (squad no. 3)
- 2007–2012: Durham (squad no. 23)
- 2011/12: Italy

Career statistics
Competition	ODI	FC	LA	T20
Matches	9	336	302	54
Runs scored	241	25,200	9,217	1,085
Batting average	26.77	45.90	33.15	23.08
100s/50s	0/2	60/146	15/48	0/7
Top score	89	254*	173*	95*
Balls bowled	0	807	200	78
Wickets	–	5	5	5
Bowling average	–	96.80	36.20	17.60
5 wickets in innings	–	0	0	0
10 wickets in match	–	0	0	0
Best bowling	–	1/0	1/10	3/19
Catches/stumpings	1/–	417/–	123/–	10/–
- Source: CricInfo, 18 July 2020

Michael James Di Venuto (born 12 December 1973) is an Australian cricket coach and former first-class cricketer who represented both Australia (in One Day Internationals) and Italy. The bulk of his first-class cricket career was spent playing for Tasmanian Tigers. After retiring from representative cricket in Australia, he continued playing for Durham County Cricket Club till July 2012, when he announced retirement from County Cricket. He has also previously played cricket in England for Derbyshire and Sussex. A left hand opening batsman, his form for Tasmania throughout the mid-1990s earned him a call up for the Australian national cricket team in the One Day International arena, although after nine games he was dropped. Like some of his contemporary Tasmanian teammates such as Jamie Cox, Dene Hills, and Shaun Young, Di Venuto can be considered unlucky to have not had a more successful international career, as he was playing at a time when the Australian national cricket team was highly dominant, and difficult to earn selection for. After retiring from Durham, he was appointed Australia's full-time batting coach by head coach Mickey Arthur, and was then head coach of Surrey from 2016 until 2020.

== Early career ==
Born in Hobart, Tasmania of Italian Australian extraction, Michael Di Venuto attended St Virgil's College, and began his cricketing career representing St. Virgil's Cricket Club. Michael's father, Enrico, and brother, Peter, were also talented cricketers, but were both surpassed by his own ability. Showing his talent from an early age, he soon joined North Hobart Cricket Club, who participate in the Tasmanian Cricket Association's TCA Grade Cricket Competition. It was in that competition that Di Venuto first made a name for himself. His form in the TCA competition soon drew the attention of state selectors, and Di Venuto was selected to make his first-class debut in the 1991–92 whilst still a teenager.

In the 1992–93 season, he returned to club cricket to find some more experience. His return worked well, and he won the Roger Wolley Medal for man-of-the-match in that season's TCA Grand Final, guiding them to the championship in the process. In that season, he also scored a brilliant innings score of 187 against University, still the second-highest score in Tasmanian grade competitions. Following a move to Kingborough Cricket Club, he again won the award in 1996–97, helping them to the trophy as well. In all, Di Venuto played in 8 TCA grand finals for both clubs.

In 2005–06, Di Venuto decided to return to the North Hobart Cricket Club where his grade cricket career had begun. Although his first-class career occupied much of his time, Di Venuto has returned to North Hobart occasionally, such as in March 2009, when a superbly-made 111 helped the Demons to victory over Clarence District Cricket Club to reach the TCA Grand Final, although the final was lost to arch-rivals University of Tasmania Cricket Club.

== First-class career ==
Di Venuto was called up to make his first-class debut against Queensland at the age of 19. In a match played at the Gabba from 13–16 March 1992, Di Venuto came into the Tasmanian side for the first time. Although not performing exceptionally, his 33 not out showed he had the temperament to move onto the next level, and helped Tasmania to a total of 400/6 declared. The match ended in a draw, but Di Venuto was now in the minds of the Tasmanian selectors. The following season Di Venuto did not feature for his state at first-class level, but returned to grade cricket to refine his technique. The break worked. Di Venuto returned for the 1993/94 season, and scored 678 runs at 37.66, with a high score of 125 a highlight. Di Venuto's return also helped Tasmania qualify for the Sheffield Shield final for the first time ever. They played against the New South Wales Blues at the Sydney Cricket Ground, but the occasion of reaching the final proved too much, with New South Wales won by an innings and 61 runs.

The following season he returned figures of 656 runs at 32.80 batting at number four, cementing his spot in the Tasmanian middle order. Di Venuto truly came to the fore in the 1995/96 season. His 791 runs at 43.94 saw him end the season as Tasmania's third most effective batsman, behind only experienced opener Dene Hills, and international legend David Boon. With his regular place in the order assured by the 1996/97 season, Di Venuto regularly moved into the number three spot to cover Ricky Ponting's absence through international duties. Although his form dipped slightly at times during the season under this extra pressure, he still returned 799 runs at 39.95. This was Tasmania's third highest tally for the year, but was well overshadowed by Jamie Cox, who scored a remarkable 1349 runs at 67.45. Along with Ponting (850 at 70.83), they kept the Tiger's in the hunt for another final, although the season fell away with Tasmania finishing fourth. Di Venuto's form in the 1996/97 Mercantile Mutual Cup was just as impressive – in five innings he scored 274 runs at 68.50, including a high-score of 129 not out. This was the second highest season tally behind only Queensland Bulls batsman Jimmy Maher, and earned him a call up to the Australian One Day International side.

His form for Tasmania in the late 1990s soon drew the attention of English county sides, and he signed for Sussex County Cricket Club for the 1999 season. He scored 1,133 runs for Derbyshire in 2005 but it was not enough to prevent relegation. Di Venuto has made the switch to Durham in readiness for the 2007 season, having served Derbyshire for eight years. Upon his first County Championship appearance for Durham in April 2007, Di Venuto carried his bat as the number one batsman throughout Durham's first innings. Di Venuto repeated this feat just three weeks later, scoring a double-century against Kent. In August 2009 Di Venuto hit his highest score of 254 not out against former side Sussex at Chester-le-Street.

Di Venuto's successes with the Tasmanian Tigers have been far greater. His 10,117 at 40.96 see him behind only Jamie Cox (11,812) as Tasmania's all-time leading run scorer. The mainstay of the top of the Tiger's batting order for over a decade, he is Tasmania's leading one-day run-scorer, and has the most "50's" in Pura Cup history. He is behind only David Boon and Jamie Cox for the most appearances for the Tigers. After 17 seasons representing his state side, and helping them to their first Sheffield Shield title, Di Venuto retired from the Tasmanian side in 2008.

On 9 July 2012, he retired from English county cricket. He played a key role in helping Durham win back-to-back first-class County Championship titles, including a huge haul of 1,654 runs with two double hundreds when they won the competition for a second time in 2009. But di Venuto has struggled for runs this season, averaging under 30, with Durham bottom of the First Division table.

== International career ==
Michael Di Venuto's form in the 1996/97 Mercantile Mutual Cup inspired the Australian national selectors to include him in the Australian squad for a tour to South Africa in 1997. He made his one-day international debut against South Africa in the first match of the one-day series at Buffalo Park, East London. South Africa won the toss and chose to field, and Di Venuto opened the batting alongside Mark Taylor. He took an aggressive approach from the outset, scoring 23 runs off 16 balls, before being caught off the bowling of Jacques Kallis. It was the fourth highest score in an Australian total of 223/9 off 50, but it wasn't enough to stop South Africa winning by 6 wickets. Di Venuto was omitted for the second match, and it didn't help his cause that his replacement, the experienced Mark Waugh scored 115 not out, carrying his bat through the innings to guide Australia to a victory by 7 wickets and level the series 1–1. Despite Mark Waugh's heroics, Di Venuto was given another chance in the third match, but was disappointingly run out for 13 in a match South Africa won by 13 runs. In the fourth match, he was again run out, this time for 14, but Australia won by 15 runs to again level the series at 2–2. Faced with a premature end to his international career, Di Venuto needed a big innings in the fifth match of the series, and he provided it. He and opening partner Greg Blewett put on a stand of 93 for the first wicket before Blewett fell. But Di Venuto carried on, scoring 89 off 135 balls, but finally fell a disappointing 11 runs short of a maiden One Day International century. Australia made 258, and won by 8 runs to take a 2–3 lead in the series, and Di Venuto's top score for the Australians earned him the man-of-the-match award, which later proved to be the highlight of his one-day career. Di Venuto was again omitted from the side for the 6th match, but returned in match seven, where he was only able to produce another disappointing score of 11.

Overall the tour to South Africa had produced mixed results for Di Venuto. his top-score of 89 had shown he had the talent to compete at international level, but he had also given his wicket away on more than one occasion, and offered inconsistent scores. The tour had resulted in 150 runs at 30.00 in 5 innings for Di Venuto, the fifth best return of the Australians. It was enough to see him again called up for the start of the 1997/98 Carlton & United Series against South Africa and New Zealand, where he was again asked to open the batting. In game one against South Africa at the Sydney Cricket Ground, he could only manage a score of 1. In match three against New Zealand at the Adelaide Oval, Di Venuto returned his second best career score of 77, and starring alongside Mark Waugh (104 runs) in an excellent opening stand of 156 for the first wicket. In match four the Australians again met South Africa, this time at the Melbourne Cricket Ground, but Di Venuto failed again with only 6 runs. This inconsistency was starting to weigh against Di Venuto, and the press began to doubt his temperament. When he only returned 7 runs against New Zealand in match six at the MCG, Di Venuto was dropped from the side, and he would not return to the Australian side. In four innings during the series Di Venuto had only managed 91 runs at 22.75.

In all, Michael Di Venuto represented Australia in nine One Day Internationals, scoring 241 runs at an average of 26.77. He had a high-score of 89 scored against South Africa at New Wanderers Stadium, Johannesburg, and his only other score of note was 77 against New Zealand at the Adelaide Oval. Although a talented batsman, his aggressive, attacking style of play which was shown by his strike-rate of 85.76, led him to give his wicket away cheaply too often, as he sought to go on the offensive early on in his innings.

He holds an Italian passport, allowing him to play county cricket without being classed as an overseas player and making him eligible for the Italian national cricket team. He made his debut for Italy 2012 ICC World Twenty20 Qualifier. His older brother, Peter played five games for Italy at the 2000 European Cricket Championship and two games in the 2002 edition of the tournament.

== Coaching ==
In 2013, Di Venuto was appointed the Australian national cricket team's full-time batting coach by head coach Mickey Arthur. In January 2016, due to an illness to incumbent coach Darren Lehmann, Di Venuto was appointed senior coach for the T20I series against India.

In February 2016 Di Venuto joined Surrey County Cricket Club as head coach, remaining there until 2020; he was head coach in 2018 when the club won its first County Championship title since 2002. In July 2021, along with Jeff Vaughan, he was appointed as the assistant coach of the Australian men's cricket team.
