= Richard Soule =

Australian cricketer (born 1966)

Personal information
- Full name: Richard Eric Soule
- Born: 5 September 1966 (age 60); Launceston, Tasmania, Australia
- Batting: Right-handed
- Role: Wicket-keeper
- Relatives: Jim Hammond (great-uncle)

Domestic team information
- Years: Team
- 1983/84–1990/91: Tasmania

Career statistics
Competition	FC	LA
Matches	57	11
Runs scored	1,490	145
Batting average	20.98	29.00
100s/50s	1/6	–/1
Top score	101*	51*
Balls bowled	10	–
Wickets	–	–
Bowling average	–	–
5 wickets in innings	–	–
10 wickets in match	–	–
Best bowling	–	–
Catches/stumpings	119/5	9/–
- Source: Cricinfo, 3 January 2011

Richard Eric Soule (born 5 September 1966) is a former Australian cricketer, who played for Tasmania. He played for Tasmania from 1983 until 1991.

He was a talented wicket-keeper, who played well during Tasmania's dark period in the 1980s when the side struggled for any success, and was also reliable lower order batsman.

== See also ==
- List of Tasmanian representative cricketers
