= Daniel Marsh =

Australian cricketer

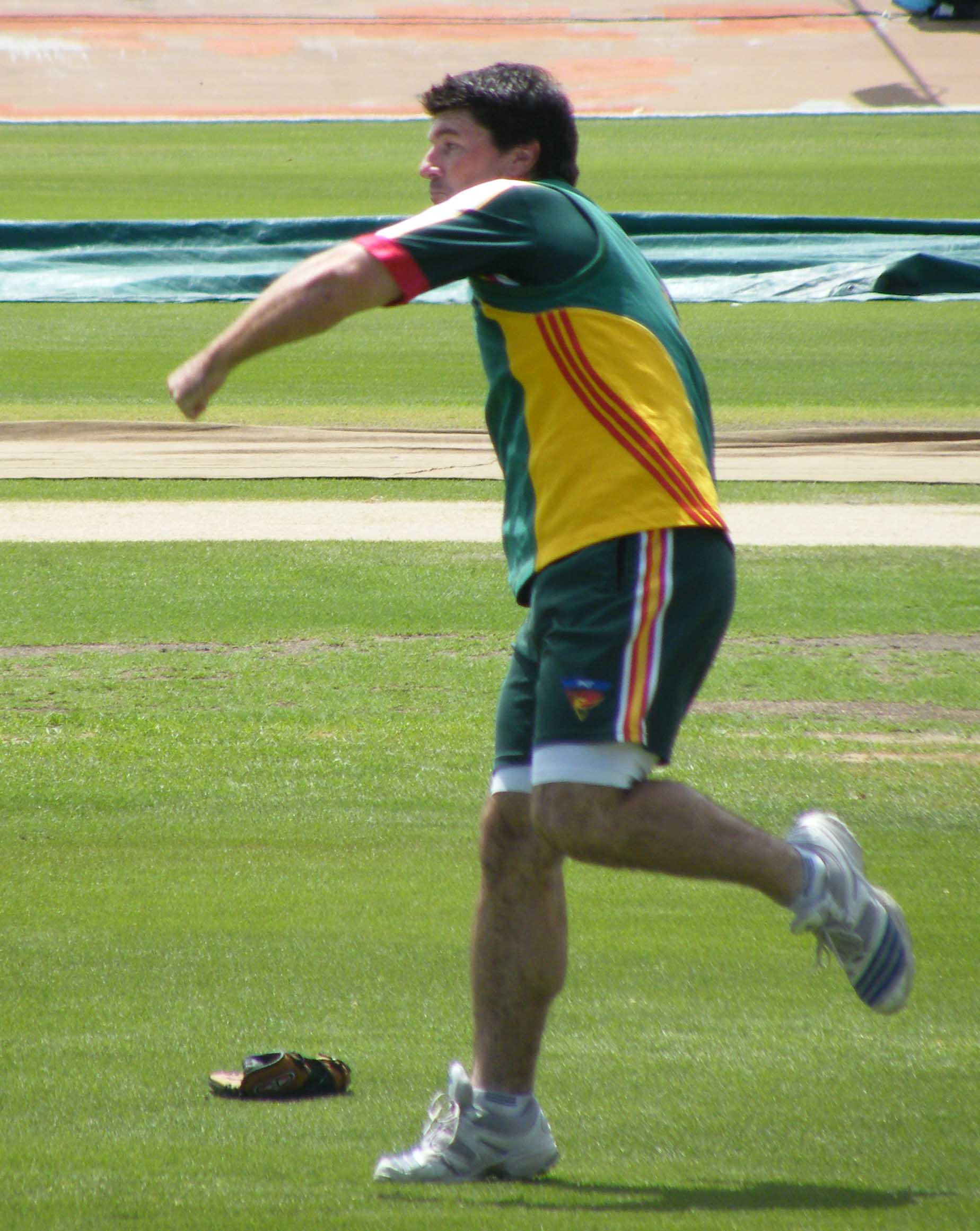

Personal information
- Full name: Daniel James Marsh
- Born: 14 June 1973 (age 53); Subiaco, Western Australia
- Nickname: SOB (Son of Bacchus)
- Height: 1.80 m (5 ft 11 in)
- Batting: Right-handed
- Bowling: Left-arm orthodox spin
- Role: All rounder

Domestic team information
- Years: Team
- 1993/94–1995/96: South Australia
- 1996/97–2009/10: Tasmania (squad no. 4)
- 2001: Leicestershire

Career statistics
Competition	FC	LA	T20
Matches	150	129	13
Runs scored	8,146	3,119	182
Batting average	37.36	33.53	16.54
100s/50s	16/43	4/16	0/0
Top score	157	106*	30
Balls bowled	16,265	3,799	173
Wickets	174	61	9
Bowling average	46.80	49.96	26.33
5 wickets in innings	1	0	0
10 wickets in match	0	0	0
Best bowling	7/57	4/44	3/18
Catches/stumpings	175/–	58/–	5/–
- Source: CricInfo, 17 August 2009

Daniel James Marsh (born 14 June 1973) is a former Australian cricketer who captained the Tasmanian Tigers. The son of the late former Australian keeper Rod Marsh, he was a right-handed batsman and a handy slow left-arm orthodox bowler. He played for South Australia early on in his career and played County Cricket for Leicestershire County Cricket Club.

Dan Marsh was a powerful striker of the ball and was capable of occupying the crease for long periods. He led the Tasmanians to just their second ever trophy when they won the 2004–05 ING Cup. He contributed a half century in the final. As Tasmania's stand-in captain in the absence of Australian Test cricket captain Ricky Ponting, Marsh led Tasmania to its maiden Pura Cup final win in 2006–07, and also captained the Tigers to their third domestic one-day trophy when they won the Ford Ranger Cup in 2007–08.

Whilst Ricky Ponting was officially the Tasmanian cricket captain from 2001/02 until he announced he was standing down on 21 November 2007, this was primarily a ceremonial appointment in order to have the Australian captain as Tasmanian captain as well. In effect Marsh, his vice-captain, performed the captaincy duties on most occasions, and was appointed outright following Ponting standing aside. He retired from First Class Cricket at the end of the 2009–10 Australian domestic season.

Preceded by Ricky Ponting	Tasmanian First-Class cricket captains 2002/03 – 2008/09	Succeeded by George Bailey
Preceded by Ricky Ponting	Tasmanian One-Day cricket captains 2003/04 – 2008–09	Succeeded by George Bailey
