= Jack Simmons (cricketer) =

English cricketer (born 1941)

John Simmons MBE
Personal information
- Full name: Jack Simmons
- Born: 28 March 1941 (age 85); Clayton-le-Moors, Lancashire, England
- Nickname: Flat Jack
- Height: 1.86 m (6 ft 1 in)
- Batting: Right-handed
- Bowling: Right-arm Off break
- Role: All rounder

Domestic team information
- Years: Team
- 1968 to 1989: Lancashire
- 1972–73 to 1979–80: Tasmania

Career statistics
Competition	FC	List A
Matches	450	471
Runs scored	9,417	3,421
Batting average	22.52	18.19
100s/50s	6/41	0/7
Top score	112	65
Balls bowled	67,009	21,070
Wickets	1,033	498
Bowling average	27.18	25.77
5 wickets in innings	41	5
10 wickets in match	6	n/a
Best bowling	7/59	5/17
Catches/stumpings	341/–	132/–
- Source: Cricinfo profile, 4 December 2008

John Simmons (born 28 March 1941) is a former English cricketer who played for Lancashire and Tasmania.

== Early life ==
Born 28 March 1941, Clayton-le-Moors, Lancashire, Simmons grew up there. He attended Accrington Technical School and then Blackburn Technical College, where he proved to be a gifted cricketer. He was a professional cricketer in the lower Lancashire leagues and, by his late 20s, Lancashire County Cricket Club had begun to scout him.

== First-class career ==
Simmons was a lower-order right-hand batsman and a right-arm off break bowler. A sharp close fielder, he played into his late 40s.

He was a late arrival to county cricket at the age of 28, but he enjoyed a 20-year career in which he was a regular part of the Lancashire side. His flat bowling trajectory and his accuracy meant that he could be economical in one-day cricket, and he was part of the successful Lancashire side that won the Gillette Cup, the premier one-day competition in England, for three years in a row from 1970 to 1972. Simmons and slow left-arm bowler David Hughes were the first pair of spin bowlers to be used regularly and successfully in one-day cricket, which had previously been the preserve of seam bowling.

In first-class cricket, Simmons reliably contributed more than 500 runs and 50 wickets in many seasons. Even at the age of 47, he took 63 wickets in 1988. The affection for "Flat Jack" in Lancashire was shown by his 1980 benefit, which raised £128,000. He was a Wisden Cricketer of the Year in 1985.

In 1972–73, he was invited to Tasmania as captain of the state side, whose first-class matches were restricted to games against touring sides. In six seasons as captain, Simmons led Tasmania into full first-class status and into the Sheffield Shield competition from 1977 to 1978.

== Later life ==
After half a dozen matches in the 1989 English season, Simmons retired. He was Lancashire chairman from 1997 to 2008 and is a senior vice-president. Simmons was elected as Chairman of Cricket for the England and Wales Cricket Board in February 2008, for two years.

== See also ==
- List of Tasmanian representative cricketers

Preceded by Rohan Kanhai	Tasmanian First-class cricket captains 1975/76-78/79	Succeeded by Brian Davison
Preceded by Khalid Ibadulla	Tasmanian One-day cricket captains 1972/73-78/79	Succeeded by Brian Davison
