= Jamie Cox =

Australian cricketer, born 1969

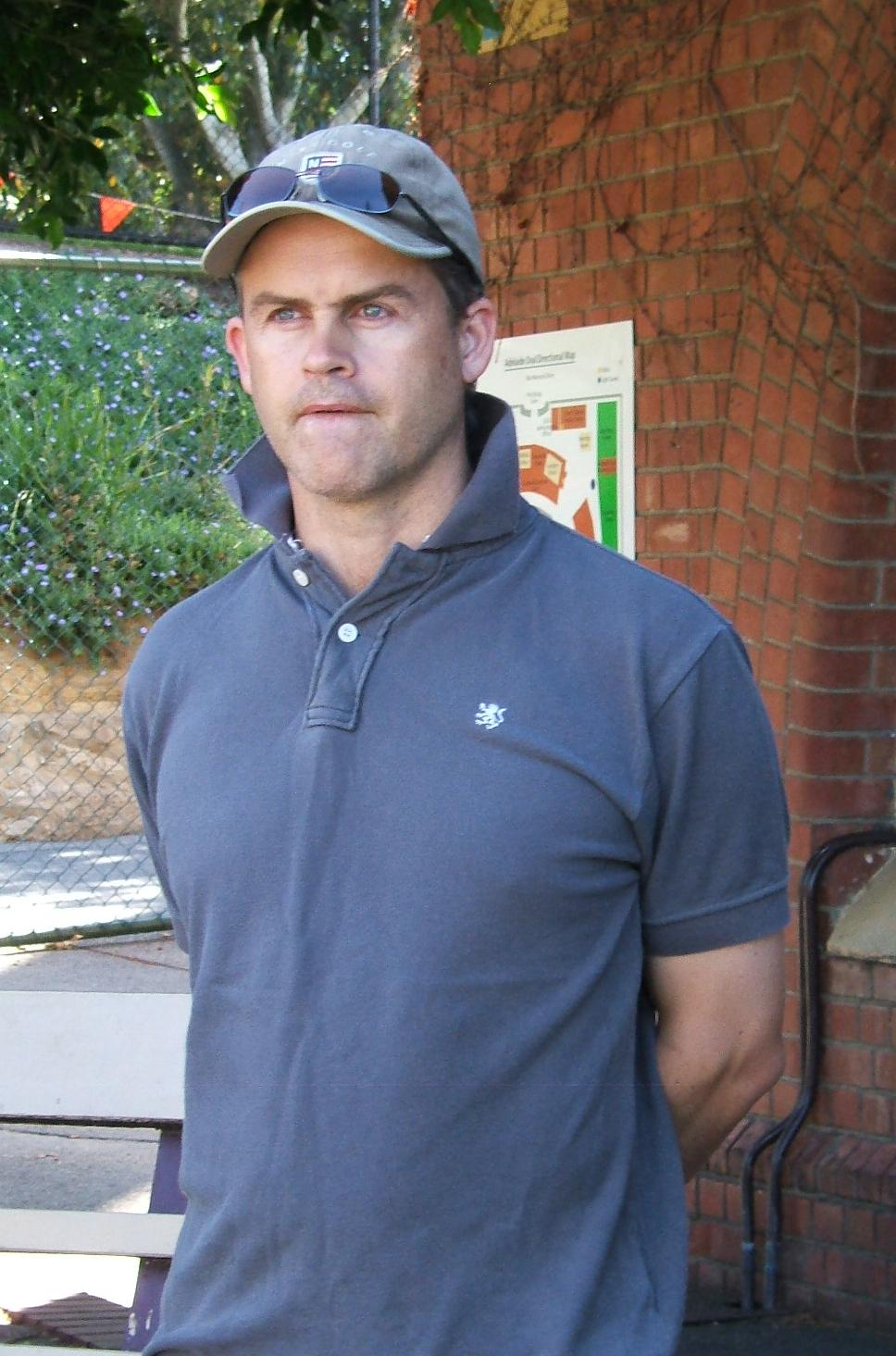

Personal information
- Full name: Jamie Cox
- Born: 15 October 1969 (age 57); Burnie, Tasmania, Australia
- Batting: Right-handed
- Bowling: Right-arm off break
- Role: Batsman

Domestic team information
- Years: Team
- 1987–2006: Tasmania
- 1999–2004: Somerset

Career statistics
Competition	FC	LA	T20
Matches	264	192	7
Runs scored	18,614	5,716	139
Batting average	42.69	31.75	23.16
100s/50s	51/81	6/39	0/1
Top score	250	131	53
Balls bowled	729	180	–
Wickets	5	4	–
Bowling average	94.00	36.00	–
5 wickets in innings	0	0	–
10 wickets in match	0	0	–
Best bowling	3/46	3/28	–
Catches/stumpings	124/–	63/–	2/–
- Source: Cricinfo, 25 February 2008

Jamie Cox (born 15 October 1969) is an Australian cricketer and former opening batsman for Tasmania in Australia's domestic competitions.

He then played county cricket in England where he captained Somerset. He is a former member of the Cricket Australia's National Selection Committee and previously Director of Cricket at the South Australian Cricket Association. He was then General Manager of Football Performance at the St Kilda Football Club in the AFL, before being appointed to the MCC staff as Assistant Secretary.

== Career ==
Cox was born at Burnie in Tasmania on 15 October 1969 and from a young age was breaking batting records. In high school, he broke the all-schools batting record for Australian school cricket, previously held by Bill Lawry. He made his first grade debut for Wynyard as a 15-year-old in 1984.

As a young player, Cox played Australian Rules Football for local side Wynyard, before being drafted to the Victorian Football League's Essendon Football Club in 1987. However, Cox never played a senior game with the Bombers, instead focusing on cricket.

In first grade cricket, Cox, with partner Dene Hills broke the Tasmanian first grade partnership record in his first season, and was immediately elevated to first-class cricket before his 18th birthday, in 1987.

Cox was expected to go from there to play for Australia and to captain Australia in Test cricket. However, in Cox's first 5 seasons and in spite of mostly batting with Hills, Cox finished with a batting average under 30. In 1992, at the age of 23, Jamie Cox had his first good season, where he averaged over 50, and from then on he averaged over 50 in 8 consecutive seasons, bringing his cumulative batting average up to nearly 50.

In 2001, Jamie Cox was playing county cricket for Somerset in England when the Australian tourists played.

At the end of the 2004 season with Somerset, Jamie Cox was dropped from the county team. Approaching retirement, with Tasmania failing to select him after playing the occasional game in the next season, he announced his retirement from first-class cricket in March 2006.

=== Post-playing career ===
Cox was a cricket media analyst/journalist and Athlete Career and Education Consultant with the Tasmanian Institute of Sport.

After writing his "Postcards" series in various newspapers while playing, he already appeared in both Australian and International print, including Inside Cricket magazine, and on ABC television broadcasts as a commentator.
Cox was used briefly as a boundary-line commentator during ABC Television's Tasmanian Football League broadcasts during the early part of the 1990s.

In November 2006, he was regarded as a surprise choice to replace Allan Border as a selector of the national cricket team. He stepped down from this role in 2011.

Cox was Director of Cricket at the South Australian Cricket Association from mid-2008 until his sacking in 2014.

He was General Manager of Football Performance at AFL club St Kilda from 2014 until he joined the MCC staff in 2021.

In December 2023, it was announced that he would be the next CEO of Somerset.

Sporting positions
Preceded by Rod Tucker	Tasmanian first-class cricket captains 1999/2000–2002/03	Succeeded by Ricky Ponting
Preceded by Rod Tucker	Tasmanian one-day cricket captains 1996/97–2002/03	Succeeded by Ricky Ponting
Preceded by Peter Bowler	Somerset County Cricket Captain; 1999–2002	Succeeded by Mike Burns
