= Derwent Cricket Club =

- Nickname: Oldest Cricket Club in Australia
- Short name: DCC
- Founded: 12 February 1835
- Home ground: North Warrane Oval
- Colours: Royal blue
- Captain: Marcus Jackson
- Titles: SCA 2nd Grade T20 Premiers; 4th Grade T20 Premiers; 10 TCA
- 2008–09 STCL: 1st

The Derwent Cricket Club was established 12 February 1835 after a resolution passed at a meeting of the Hobart Town Cricket Club, which then became the Derwent Cricket Club and is the "oldest cricket club in Australia".

DCC's first match was a single wicket match against Hobart Town Cricket Club, 18 February 1835, seeing DCC victorious by 6 runs. Derwent Cricket Club's first home turf was located on the original Government House grounds, called "the paddock".

The gentlemen of Derwent Cricket Club were extremely influential in early Hobart. Stars on and off the field, performing at the Argyle theatre. It was said "it is well known that club possesses considerable influence, a crowded house may be expected."

Derwent played matches against the youth of the original custodians of the land, these matches had considerable interest and excitement.

DCC's first game for a prize, was played between two teams from the club. Prize pool for the victors was 100 sovereigns, worth in today's money AUD 35,000.
