= Terence Cowley =

Australian cricketer

Personal information
- Full name: Terence John Cowley
- Born: 17 July 1928; Evandale, Tasmania
- Died: 30 January 2012 (aged 83); Launceston, Tasmania
- Batting: Left-handed
- Bowling: Right-arm medium fast
- Role: Bowler

Domestic team information
- Years: Team
- 1948-49 – 1961-62: Tasmania

Career statistics
Competition	FC
Matches	30
Runs scored	660
Batting average	12.94
100s/50s	–/4
Top score	59
Balls bowled	5738
Wickets	94
Bowling average	31.51
5 wickets in innings	3
10 wickets in match	1
Best bowling	6/55
Catches/stumpings	14/–
- Source: cricinfo.com, 1 December 2008

Terence John "Terry" Cowley (born 17 July 1928, in Evandale, Tasmania, died 30 January 2012 in Launceston, Tasmania) was a cricket player, who played first-class cricket for Tasmania.

He was a right-arm medium-fast bowler and he represented Tasmania in 30 first-class matches. Cowley had the honour of captaining the Tasmanian side five times in the 1960–61 and 1961–62 season, although Tasmania only managed to lose four and draw one during his captaincy.

== See also ==
- List of Tasmanian representative cricketers
