= Cricket Tasmania =

Sports governing body in Tasmania, Australia

- Sport: Cricket
- Founded: 1906; 120 years ago
- Affiliation: Cricket Australia
- Headquarters: Bellerive Oval
- Location: Bellerive, Tasmania

Official website
- www.crickettas.com.au
- (Tasmania)
- (Australia)

Cricket Tasmania (formerly the Tasmanian Cricket Association) is the administrative body for cricket in Tasmania, Australia, and is based at Bellerive Oval in Hobart.

Cricket Tasmania's primary purpose is to promote and develop the game of cricket in Tasmania, run junior and educational programmes and competitions and administer the Premier League competitions in the State.

Cricket Tasmania is also responsible for the selection and administration of Tasmania's first class cricket team, the Tasmanian Tigers that competes in the national Sheffield Shield, the Australian first-class competition, and the Hobart Hurricanes franchise that competes in the "Big Bash League", the domestic Twenty20 competition.

The current Chair of Cricket Tasmania (CT) is Tim Scott, who took over from former Australian cricket David Boon

Cricket in Tasmania is broadly organised into three regions; each with sub-regional competitions. The Southern Tasmanian Cricket association was formed in the 1850s and was renamed as the Tasmanian Cricket Association (TCA) in 1906 before the State responsibilities were taken over by Cricket Tasmania and the SCA returned to responsibilities for competitions in southern Tasmania. The Northern Tasmania Cricket Association was formed in 1886 covering north-eastern Tasmania competitions and is based at the historic "NTCA Ground" where the first First Class cricket match in Australia was played. The north-western region is managed by Cricket North West.

== See also ==
- History of Women's Cricket in Australia
- Lily Poulett-Harris
