= Tasmania cricket team =

Australian domestic cricket team

Tasmanian Tigers

Personnel
- Captain: (Australia) Jordan Silk
- Coach: (Australia) Jeff Vaughan

Team information
- Colours: Green Gold Red
- Founded: 1851; 175 years ago
- Home ground: Ninja Stadium
- Capacity: 20,000

History
- First-class debut: Victoria in 1851 at Launceston
- Sheffield Shield wins: 3 (2007, 2011, 2013)
- One-Day Cup wins: 4 (1979, 2005, 2008, 2010)
- KFC Twenty20 Big Bash wins: 0
- Official website: Tasmanian Tigers
First-class
One-day

The Tasmania men's cricket team, nicknamed the Tigers, represents the Australian state of Tasmania in cricket. They compete annually in the Australian domestic senior men's cricket season, which consists of the first-class Sheffield Shield and the limited overs Marsh One-Day Cup.

Tasmania played in the first first-class cricket match in Australia against Victoria in 1851, which they won by three wickets. Despite winning their first match, and producing many fine cricketers in the late 19th century, Tasmania was overlooked when the participants in Australian first-class tournament known as the Sheffield Shield were chosen in 1892. For nearly eighty years the Tasmanian team played an average of only two or three first-class matches per year, usually against one of the mainland Australian teams, or warm-up matches against a touring international test team. The English "bodyline" team of the 1930s played Tasmania in Launceston

Tasmania were finally admitted to regular competitions when they became a founding member of the Gillette Cup domestic one day cricket tournament upon its inception in 1969. They have performed well in it, winning it four times, and having been runners-up twice. It took a further eight seasons before Tasmania were admitted into the Sheffield Shield in 1977–78, and it was initially on a reduced fixtures list, but by the 1979–80 season, they had become full participants, and slowly progressed towards competitiveness within the tournament, first winning in the 2006–07 season—after almost 30 years in the competition. In the KFC Twenty20 Big Bash the Tigers have yet to win, but were runners-up in 2006–07.

Tasmania play their limited overs cricket in a predominantly green uniform, with red and gold as their secondary colours, and have a Tasmanian tiger as their team logo. They play home matches at Bellerive Oval, Clarence on Hobart's Eastern Shore, though matches are occasionally played at venues in Devonport, Launceston and Burnie.

== History ==
=== Introduction of cricket to Tasmania ===
Cricket almost certainly has been played in Tasmania since the time of European settlement in 1803. It was a popular pastime among marines, who were responsible for security in the fledgling colony. The first recorded match is known to have taken place in 1806, although it is most likely that unrecorded matches were already being played at this time. According to the colony's chaplain, and famed diarist, Robert Knopwood by 1814 the game had become very popular, especially around the festive season at Christmas.

By the 1820s there had still not been any official club organisation, but matches were being played on a regular basis. Cricket is recorded as having been played in the settlements at Richmond, Clarence Plains, Kempton, Sorell, in the Macquarie Valley west of Campbell Town, Westbury, Evandale, Longford and Hadspen.

Many of these matches seem to have been organised between hotel licensees, in order to create profits through the sale of food and beverages, and through betting on the outcome. One such match that was arranged in March 1826 by Joseph Bowden, the hotelier of the Lamb Inn on Brisbane Street was played for a winner's purse of 50 guineas between "Eleven Gentlemen from the Counties of Sussex and Kent against the choice of the whole Island of Van Diemen's Land".

There is no evidence to suggest an "official cricket season" during the first two decades of the colony, and many of these games initially seem to have been played around June and July, to coincide with the traditional English cricket season, rather than the Tasmanian summer. Accounts of such matches suggest games were often played in atrocious conditions due to winter rains and cold conditions. But by the 1830s, logic had prevailed and cricket seems to have reverted to the southern summer months. Club cricket had also become well-established by the 1830s. One of the earliest men responsible for organising cricket within the colony was John Marshall, who was established the Hobart Town Club soon after his arrival from England. Soon after in 1835 the Derwent Cricket Club was formed making it the oldest surviving cricket club in Tasmania, and in 1841, the Launceston Cricket Club was formed, making it the second oldest surviving cricket club in Tasmania, and third oldest in Australia. Cricket had soon also spread into many regional settlements throughout the Colony of Tasmania, making it one of the most popular pastimes there. Some matches were played as part of district festivals, with large banquets following play.

=== Beginnings of first-class cricket in Australia ===
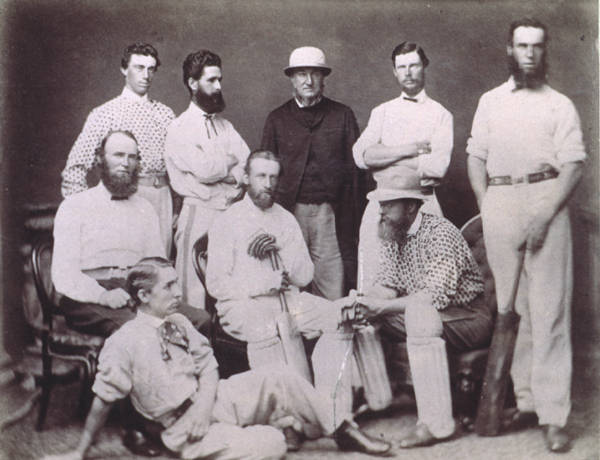
The Tasmanian team that played against Victoria in 1867.

By the late 1840s organised cricket was doing well in both Hobart and Launceston, and was spreading throughout the colony. In 1850 the first "North" versus "South" match was held in Oatlands, midway between Hobart and Launceston, and won by the South. The success of the match prompted promoters to organise an inter-colonial match, and the inaugural first-class cricket match played in Tasmania, which was also the first ever first-class cricket match in Australia, was played in 1851 between Victoria and Tasmania in Launceston at the Launceston Racecourse. The game was billed as "The Gentlemen of Port Phillip versus the Gentlemen of Van Diemen's Land". The game featured four-ball overs and no boundaries, attracted a crowd of about 2500 spectators, and it was a timeless match, but only lasted for two days. Tasmania emerged victorious by three wickets.

=== Geographic and social isolation ===
Despite winning the first ever first-class match in the Australian colonies, Tasmania felt its geographic isolation in the form of a lack of competition. Few touring teams wished to undertake the long sea journey to the island in the late 19th century. The game also developed more slowly, with Tasmanian clubs maintaining a belief in amateurism at a time when mainland clubs were turning to professionals to further their development. Also a lack of innovation stymied progress. The Victorian team that visited in 1858 had adopted the new round arm form of bowling, and it demolished the Tasmanian batting order unused to the technique. The population decline of the 1850s as Tasmanians moved to the Victorian goldfields also had a negative effect on the quality of players Tasmania could select.

Despite the problems facing Tasmanian cricket, local teams did occasionally play against competitive teams. The English tourists of 1861–62, played against Tasmania, winning by four wickets. Tasmania played against Victoria three times in the early 1870s, but lost all three matches, convincing the Victorians that Tasmania was not suitably competitive. Tasmania did not play another first-class match until 1877, when it travelled to Adelaide to take on South Australia.

The 1880s provided better progress for the colony. In 1880 the TCA Ground had been established, providing a permanent ground to play on in the colony's capital, Hobart. The establishment of an organised regular local competition led to improvement in the quality of players. John Davies, owner of local newspaper The Mercury, was a keen cricket fan, and through personal connections, he arranged various touring English teams to visit the colony, and victory for Tasmania against the English tourists in 1887–88 led to Victoria resuming competition with Tasmania.

In the 1890s, the colony was playing representative cricket against Victoria almost every year, and occasionally against New South Wales as well. The colony could also boast genuinely first-class quality players, such as Kenneth Burn, Charles Eady, and Edward Windsor, the first two of whom played test cricket for Australia. However, the retirement of Eady and Burn by 1910, and in-fighting between Hobart and Launceston again threatened first-class cricket in Tasmania. The outbreak of World War I also saw a large loss of playing talent, killed on the battlefields. Cricket was suspended during the war, and did not resume until 1923, albeit with severe financial problems.

=== Sheffield Shield wilderness ===
Tasmania v Indians at Hobart in January 1948.

Following World War I, Tasmanian representative teams usually had to content themselves with matches against touring international teams during brief stopovers, while they travelled by ship to mainland capitals. Occasionally Tasmania would play the odd game against mainland state teams, but it was usually only one first-class match per season. One notable visit was by the Jardine "bodyline" team in 1931, where they played Tasmania at the NTCA ground - England won.

The inter-war years proved a period of consolidation for Tasmania, as the state struggled to recover from the devastation of the war. Club cricket was hampered by rivalry between the south, north and north-west. Several exceptional cricketers emerged in this period, such as Laurie Nash, Jack Badcock, though a lack of opportunity led many to pursue cricket careers on the mainland. The quality of cricket in Tasmania varied from time to time, but after World War II the standard was high. Cricket resumed much faster than it had done after World War I, and excellent players such as Ronald Morrisby, Emerson Rodwell, and Bernard Considine emerged. This prompted moves to be made by the Tasmanian Cricket Association for further matches and recognition.

Despite the skills of Rodwell and Terence Cowley, Tasmania struggled to beat Victoria in the 1950s. As a result, the Victorian Cricket Association decided to end the regular matches against Tasmania, and the English tourists also decided to downgrade matches against the state to second-class status. As a result, the Tasmanian Cricket Association made a first attempt to join the Sheffield Shield in 1964, but was rejected. The Australian Cricket Board of Control outlined areas in which the state's administration would need to be improved before Tasmania could participate in the Shield. Despite this, Queensland, South Australia and Western Australia supported Tasmania by sending full-strength teams to take on the state as warm-ups to their Shield campaigns over the following few years. When the domestic one day competition was established in 1969, Tasmania was granted full playing status.

The arrival of Lancashire all rounder Jack Simmons in the 1972–73 season proved a turning point in the fortunes of the team. His inspirational captaincy lifted the competitiveness of Tasmania. In the 1974–75 and 1975–76 seasons, Tasmania were losing semi-finalists in the Gillette Cup. The Tasmanian team was finally admitted to the Sheffield Shield by the Australian Cricket Board in 1977 on a two-year trial basis, although it played a reduced roster in comparison to the other states. Tasmania's points on the ladder were calculated at x5 and /9 due to the fact they only played each other state once (instead of twice) during the season. A famous victory by 84 runs at the TCA Ground against the Indian tourists in 1977 helped the TCA to convince mainland cricket authorities that Tasmanian cricket was nationally competitive.

=== National competitiveness ===
Simmons had proved an inspirational captain for Tasmania, and although the team only won one of the twelve first-class matches under his leadership, that had more to do with the quality of the homegrown players at the time. His List A cricket record was more successful, leading Tasmania to six victories in eleven matches. He also assisted the TCA in modernising the administration of cricket in the state.

After making the Gillette Cup semi-finals in the 1974–75 and 1975–76 seasons, Tasmania qualified for the final for the first time in the 1977–78 season, but lost to Western Australia at the WACA Ground by seven wickets. A surprise victory came the following year in the 1978–79 Gillette Cup domestic one-day competition, in a repeat of the previous year's final. The game was played at the TCA Ground in Hobart, and the home ground advantage proved decisive, with Tasmania beating Western Australia by 47 runs. Within a fortnight Tasmania had won their first Sheffield Shield match, again beating Western Australia, this time by four wickets in Devonport. The victory showed the mainland states Tasmania was capable of competing among the nation's best.

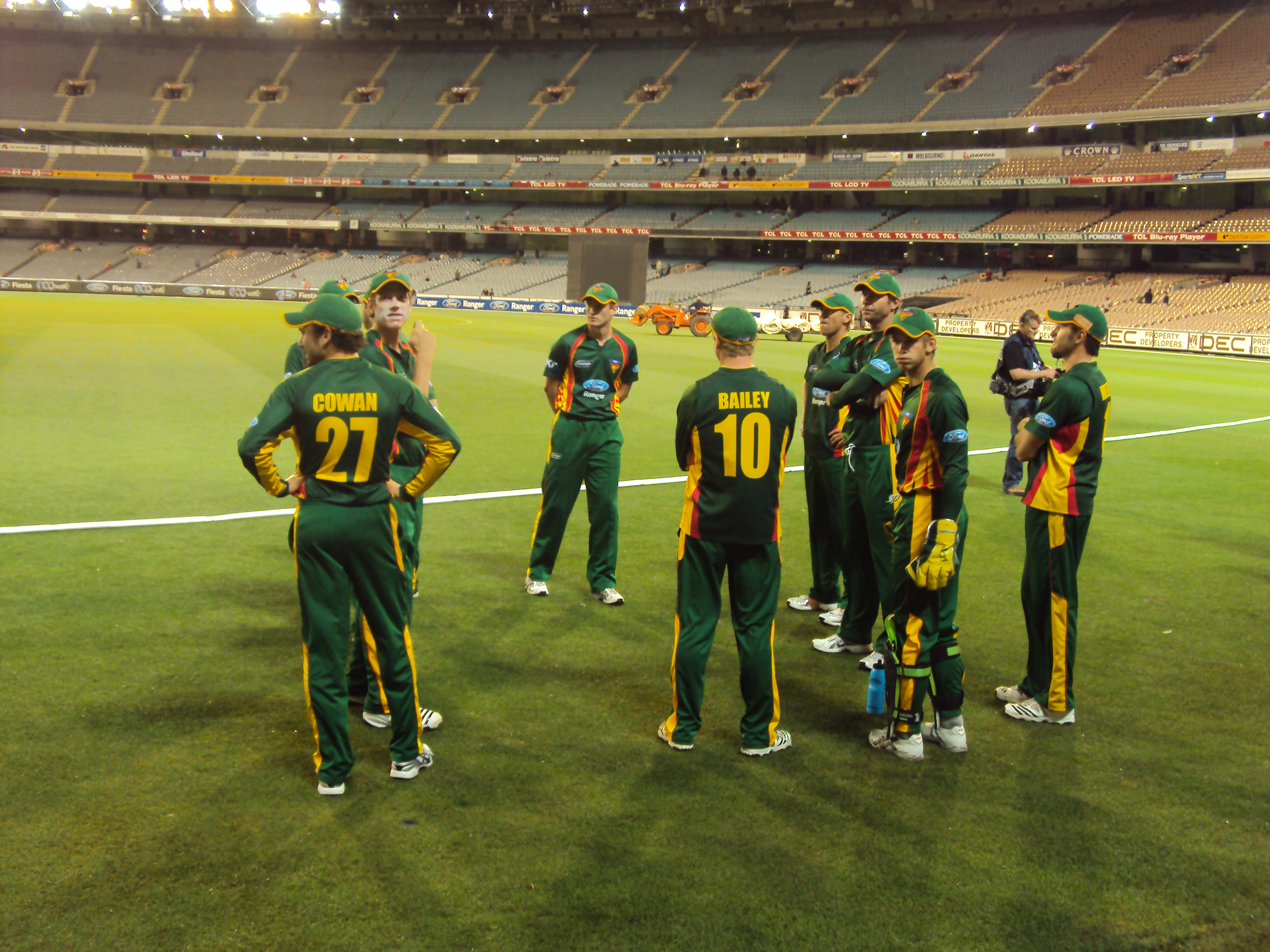
The Tasmanian Tigers at the 2009/10 Ford Ranger Cup Final. They won the game by 110 runs.

The presence of Simmons, and the 1978–79 Gillette Cup victory, had brought attention to Tasmanian cricket, and soon other international professionals joined the state for brief stints to both help out Tasmania's development, and gain further experience in Australian conditions. Michael Holding, Winston Davis, Patrick Patterson, Richard Hadlee and Dennis Lillee were among the more notable players to represent Tasmania in the late 1970s and early '80s.

After finally being admitted to the Sheffield Shield permanently, the Tasmanian team initially struggled for success and consistency, and were the competition's whipping-boys throughout the 1980s and early 90s. The rise of a local hero in the form of David Boon, who by 1984 had achieved international fame, showed the country, and the world, that Tasmanian cricket was here to stay. Wicket-keeper Roger Woolley also briefly rose to prominence, representing Australia in two tests, and four One Day Internationals in 1983–84. The pair had become the first Tasmanians to represent Australia at test level since Charles Eady in 1910.

Despite their skills, the Tasmanian team struggled to win throughout this period. Regardless of the lack of competitive success, one bright point came with the unearthing of talent in Ricky Ponting, who would go on to become one of the world's best batsmen.

=== Tasmanian Tigers era ===
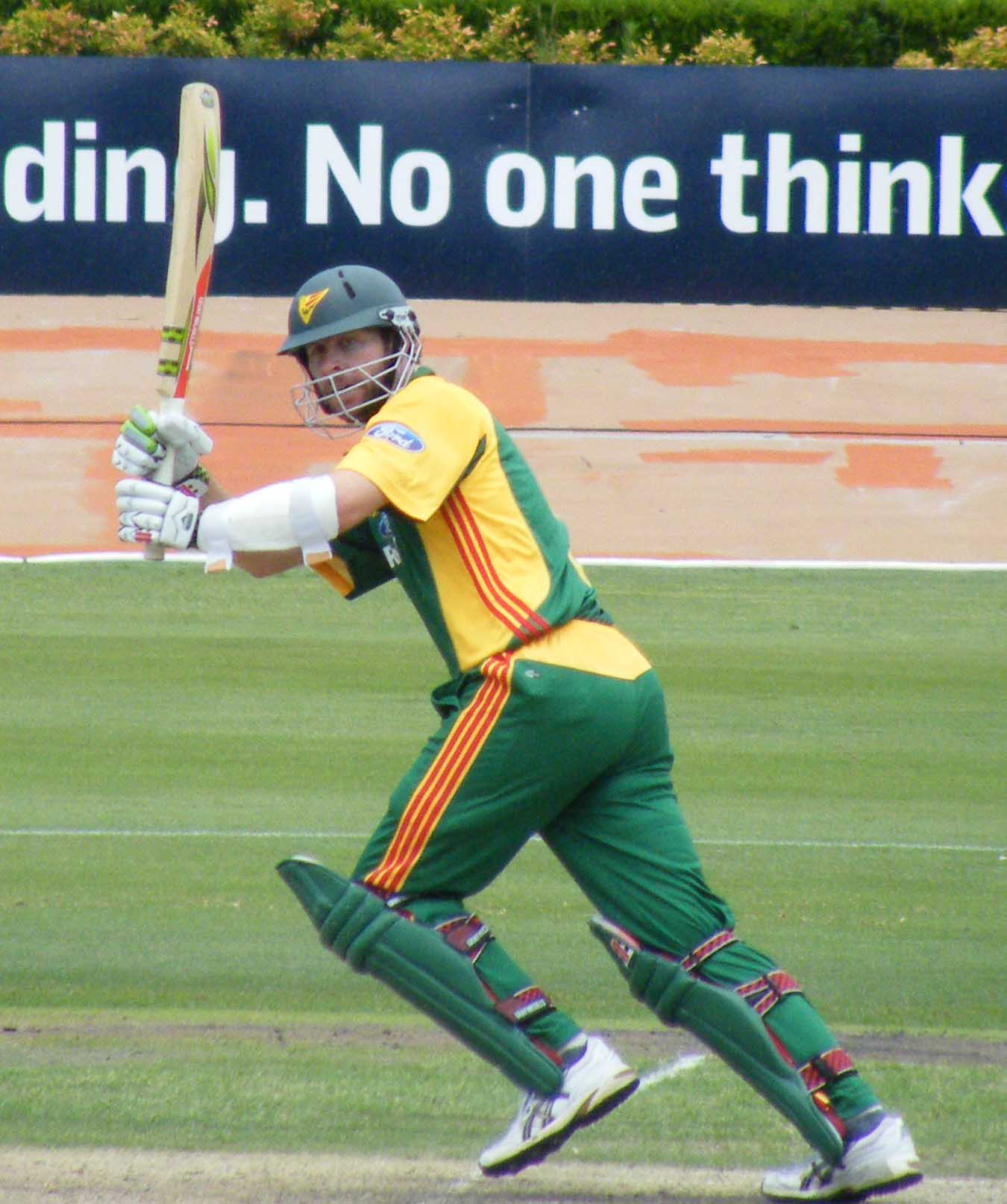
Tasmanian batsman Michael Dighton, who played an important role in the team's rise to prominence in the early 21st century.

A reshuffle in the administration and organisation of the TCA in 1991 did not have an immediate effect, but the mid-1990s brought a more professional approach, and the state's team re-branded as the Tasmanian Tigers, and with a new headquarters in the renovated Bellerive Oval, the state finally started to achieve more regular success. The team surged to the final for the first time in 1993–94, only to lose to New South Wales, but showed they were capable of successes at first class level. The 1997–98 season saw the Tigers qualify for the final off the back off a remarkable six straight victories, and they were desperately unlucky not to win the competition after such dominance.

In the late 1990s Tasmania continued to produce top level cricketers. Players such as Jamie Cox, Dene Hills, Shaun Young and Michael Di Venuto became stars of the state team, and can all be considered unlucky not to have found a place in the Australian team.

=== Recent success ===
The Tigers continue to remain competitive in all forms of the Australian domestic game, and in 2006–07 were successful in claiming their first-ever Sheffield Shield title. Five years later, they won the Shield a second time in 2010–11, and again in 2012–13. The Tigers have also qualified for the final on five other occasions in 1993–94, 1997–98, 2001–02 and 2011–12, 2023–24 but had to settle for second place.

The Tigers have fared better in the Ford Ranger Cup, winning it four times in 1978–79, 2004–05, 2007–08, and in 2009–10. They have also been runners-up twice in 1977–78, and 1986–87. The Tigers were also unlucky to finish as runners-up in the second season of the Australian domestic Twenty20 KFC Twenty20 Big Bash competition in 2006–07.

Tasmania's recent successes at domestic level have been reflected in selection for the Australian national cricket team. Spinner Jason Krejza played two tests on the back of solid performances for the state, but failed to impress at international level. Brett Geeves was selected in the One Day International squad for 2008, and has since gone on to also play in the Indian Premier League. Fast-bowler Ben Hilfenhaus was included in the national squad for the 2007 ICC World Twenty20 and a tour of India, before making his test cricket debut in South Africa in 2009. During the 2009 Ashes series, wicket-keeper Tim Paine was called into the squad as a late replacement for injured reserve wicket-keeper Graham Manou.

Cricket Australia encouraged the state teams to recruit a foreign star for the 2009/10 season, in order to boost the appeal of the KFC Twenty20 Big Bash internationally. Tasmania pulled off one of the biggest coups in this recruitment programme, when they signed Sri Lankan star Lasith Malinga. Disappointingly for the Tigers, Malinga was forced to withdraw due to a change in international commitments for the Sri Lankan team. On 16 November 2009, Cricket Tasmania announced that Dimitri Mascarenhas would replace Malinga as Tasmania's overseas player for the 2009/10 KFC Twenty20 Big Bash. However Rana Naved-Ul-Hasan played instead of Mascarenhas. Ul-Hasan also played the following season of the Big Bash.

== Home grounds ==
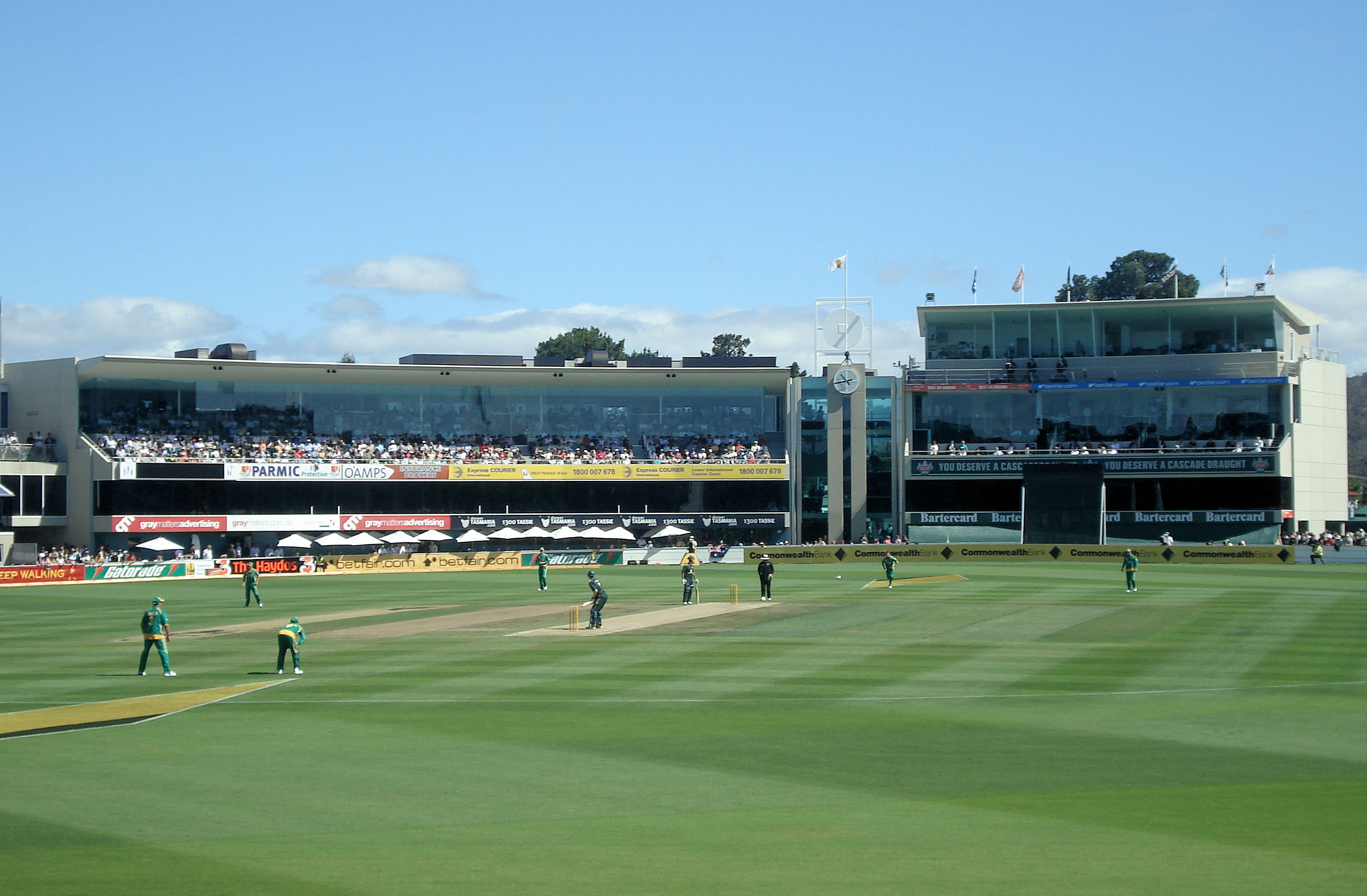
Bellerive Oval is Tasmania's current home ground.

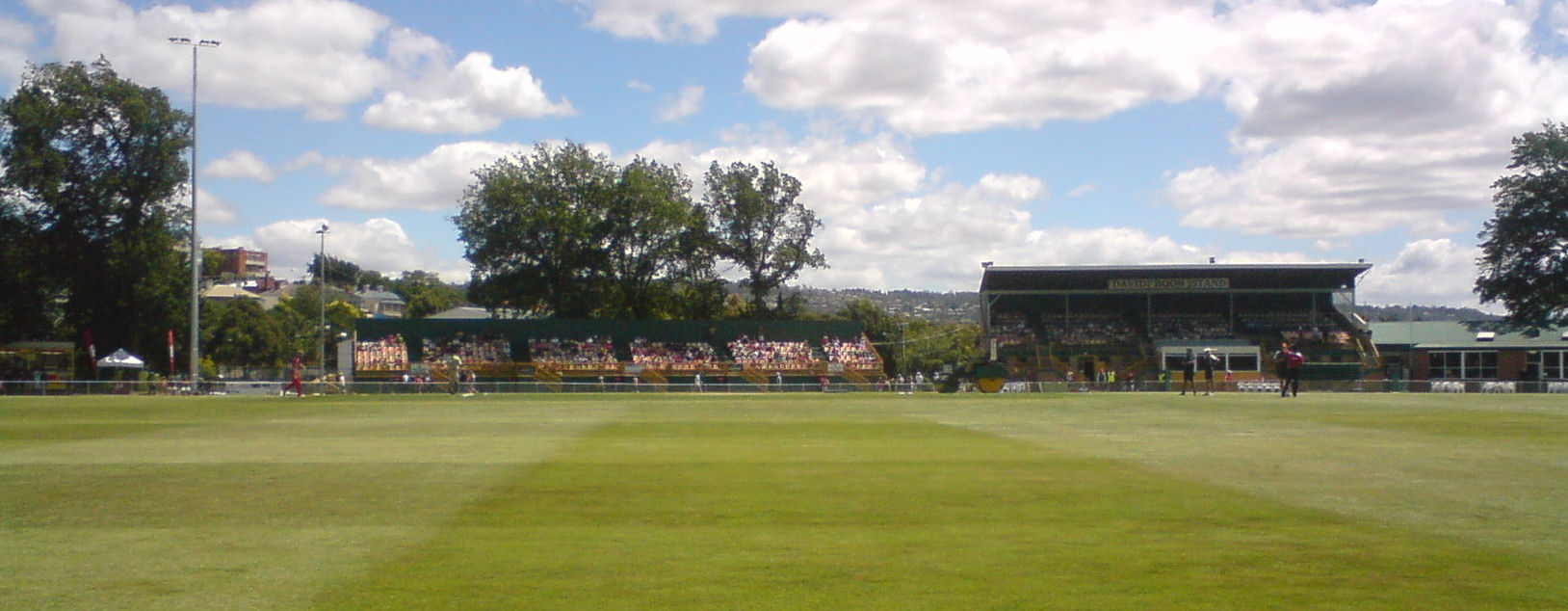
NTCA Ground

Tasmania have traditionally played cricket both in the state capital Hobart, and Launceston which is the largest city in the north of the state. Cricket was first played on open ground in Hobart, but soon dedicated fields began to be laid out. One such field was the TCA Ground on the Queens Domain. Although it wasn't officially opened until 1880, cricket had been played on the site prior to this. From the 1880s however, it became home to both the Tasmanian Cricket Association and the state's first-class team. To ensure equal access to the population in the north, Tasmania would often also play home matches at the NTCA Ground in Launceston, which had also hosted the first-ever first-class match in Australia, between Tasmania and Victoria in 1851.

When Tasmania was admitted to the Gillette Cup for the 1969–70 season, they began to spread the matches to a third venue, Devonport Oval in Devonport. The TCA Ground had remained the Tasmanian team's official home ground though.

During the re-branding process of the early 1990s, the TCA was faced with a dilemma about their ground. The TCA Ground had a reputation for poor soil and windy conditions, and games were often played in blustery condition with chilly winds blowing off nearby Mount Wellington. The decision was made to move both the offices of the Tasmanian Cricket Association, and the official home ground to Bellerive Oval in Clarence. The decision was a wise one, as it saw test cricket introduced to the state for the first time, and coincided with an improvement in results for the Tasmanian team.

== Squad ==
Players with international caps are listed in bold:

No.	Name	Nationality	Birth date	Batting style	Bowling style	Notes
Batters
-	Nick Davis	Australia	27 September 2002 (age 24)	Right-handed	Right-arm off break	Rookie contract
14	Jordan Silk	Australia	13 April 1992 (age 34)	Right-handed	Right-arm medium	Captain
9	Charlie Wakim	Australia	9 July 1991 (age 35)	Right-handed	Right-arm off break	
61	Tim Ward	Australia	16 February 1998 (age 28)	Left-handed	–	
11	Jake Weatherald	Australia	4 November 1994 (age 32)	Left-handed	Right-arm leg break	
33	Mac Wright	Australia	22 January 1998 (age 28)	Right-handed	Right-arm leg break	
All-rounders
30	Brad Hope	Australia	13 July 1999 (age 27)	Right-handed	Right-arm medium	
17	Raf MacMillan	Australia	1 February 2005 (age 21)	Right-handed	Right-arm off break	Rookie contract
46	Aidan O'Connor	Australia	13 July 2006 (age 20)	Right-handed	Right-arm medium-fast	Rookie contract
16	**Mitch Owen**	Australia	16 September 2001 (age 25)	Right-handed	Right-arm medium	
3	Nivethan Radhakrishnan	Australia	25 November 2002 (age 23)	Left-handed	Right-arm off break/Slow left-arm orthodox	Rookie contract
20	**Beau Webster**	Australia	1 December 1993 (age 32)	Right-handed	Right-arm off-break/medium	
Wicket-keepers
24	Jake Doran	Australia	2 December 1996 (age 29)	Left-handed	Left-arm medium	
32	Caleb Jewell	Australia	21 April 1997 (age 29)	Left-handed	—	
13	**Matthew Wade**	Australia	26 December 1987 (age 38)	Left-handed	Right-arm medium	
Bowlers
5	Gabe Bell	Australia	3 July 1995 (age 31)	Right-handed	Right-arm medium	
35	Iain Carlisle	Australia	5 January 2000 (age 26)	Right-handed	Right-arm fast-medium	
99	Kieran Elliott	Australia	12 September 1995 (age 31)	Right-handed	Right-arm medium	
72	**Nathan Ellis**	Australia	22 September 1994 (age 32)	Right-handed	Right-arm fast-medium	
12	**Riley Meredith**	Australia	21 June 1996 (age 30)	Left-handed	Right-arm fast	
27	Lawrence Neil-Smith	Australia	1 June 1999 (age 27)	Right-handed	Right-arm medium-fast	
6	Tom Rogers	Australia	3 March 1994 (age 32)	Right-handed	Right-arm medium-fast	
37	**Billy Stanlake**	Australia	4 November 1994 (age 32)	Right-handed	Right-arm fast	
48	Paddy Dooley	Australia	17 May 1997 (age 29)	Left-handed	Left-arm wrist spin	
19	Jarrod Freeman	Australia	15 July 2000 (age 26)	Right-handed	Right-arm off-break	
30	**Matthew Kuhnemann**	Australia	20 September 1996 (age 30)	Left-handed	Slow left-arm orthodox	

- Source: Cricket Tasmania

== Notable players ==
=== Other notable former players ===
- Keith Bradshaw
- Kenneth Burn
- Greg Campbell
- Troy Cooley
- Joe Darling
- Winston Davis
- Charles Eady
- Richard Hadlee
- John Hampshire
- Neil Hawke
- Michael Holding
- David Hughes
- Khalid Ibadulla
- Tom Kendall
- Alan Knott
- Peter Lever
- Dennis Lillee
- Scott Mason
- Rod McCurdy
- Joey Palmer
- Patrick Patterson
- Mark Ridgway
- Gavin Robertson
- Franklyn Stephenson
- Shane Watson
- Dirk Wellham
- Neil Williams

=== Cricket Tasmania Field of Fame ===
- Jack Simmons (1972–1979)
- Roger Woolley (1977–1988)
- David Boon (1978–1999)
- Brian Davison (1979–1988)
- Peter Clough (1980–1984)
- Danny Buckingham (1983–1992)
- Jamie Cox (1987–2006)
- Rod Tucker (1989–1996)
- Dene Hills (1991–2001)
- Shaun Young (1991–2001)
- Colin Miller (1992–2000)
- Ricky Ponting (1992–2013)
- Michael Di Venuto (1992–2008)
- Gillette Cup Team (1978–79)
- Pura Cup Team (2006–07)
- Daniel Marsh (1996–2010)
- George Bailey (2001–2020)
- James Faulkner (2008–2020)

=== Coaches ===
- Greg Shipperd
- Brian McFadyen (2002–2005)
- Tim Coyle (2005–2013)
- Daniel Marsh (2013–2017)
- Adam Griffith (2017–2022)

== Records ==
=== Honours ===
- Sheffield Shield/Pura Cup Champions: 3

2006–07, 2010–11, 2012–13

- Sheffield Shield/Pura Cup Runner-up (since introduction of final in 1982–83): 5

1993–94, 1997–98, 2001–02, 2011–12, 2023–24

- Domestic One-Day Cup Champions: 4

1978–79, 2004–05, 2007–08, 2009–10

- Domestic One-Day Cup Runner-up: 3

1977–78, 1986–87, 2011–12

- Domestic Twenty20 Cup Champions: 0

- Domestic Twenty20 Cup Runner-up: 1

2006–07
