= List of cricketers' biographies and autobiographies =

This is a list of biographies and autobiographies of cricketers.

First Published	Book	Based on	Author
1951	Spinning Round The World	Jim Laker	Jim Laker
1960	Over To Me	Jim Laker	Jim Laker
1961	Thrown Out	Ian Meckiff	Ian Meckiff
1967	Cricket Delightful	Mushtaq Ali	Mushtaq Ali
1968	Close on Cricket	Brian Close	Brian Close
1976	Cricket Rebel	John Snow	John Snow
1976	Ball of Fire: An Autobiography	Fred Trueman	Fred Trueman
1977	One More Over	Erapalli Prasanna	Erapalli Prasanna
1977	Sunny Days	Sunil Gavaskar	Sunil Gavaskar
1982	Sir Aubrey	C. Aubrey Smith	David Rayvern Allen
1983	Imran	Imran Khan	Imran Khan with Patrick Murphy
1984	Spartan Cricketer	Douglas Jardine	Christopher Douglas
1984	Wally Hammond	Wally Hammond	Gerald Howat
1985	Playing Days	Tony Lewis	Tony Lewis
1985	A Game Enjoyed	Peter May	Peter May and Michael Melford
1987	Archie Jackson: The Keats of Cricket	Archie Jackson	David Frith
1987	Boycott: The Autobiography	Geoffrey Boycott	Geoffrey Boycott
1991	Coming of Age	Eddie Hemmings	Eddie Hemmings with Graham Otway
1995	Beating the Field	Brian Lara	Brian Lara
1996	Uncorked! Diary of a Cricket Year	Dominic Cork	Dominic Cork
1997	Under The Southern Cross	David Boon	David Boon
1997	W. G. Grace: An Intimate Biography	W. G. Grace	Robert Low
1997	Dickie Bird: My Autobiography	Dickie Bird	Dickie Bird
1998	Wasim	Wasim Akram	Wasim Akram with Patrick Murphy
1998	You Guys Are History!	Devon Malcolm	Devon Malcolm with Patrick Murphy
1998	Anything But an Autobiography	Richie Benaud	Richie Benaud
1999	Mark Taylor: Time to Declare	Mark Taylor	Mark Taylor
1999	Courtney: Heart of the Lion	Courtney Walsh	Courtney Walsh
1999	White Lightning	Allan Donald	Allan Donald with Patrick Murphy
1999	Aravinda: My Autobiography	Aravinda de Silva	Aravinda de Silva with Shahriar Khan
1999	What Now?	Phil Tufnell	Phil Tufnell
2000	Sir Vivian: The Definitive Autobiography	Vivian Richards	Vivian Richards with Bob Harris
2000	Hands and Heals	Ian Healy	Ian Healy
2000	David Lloyd: The Autobiography - Anything but Murder	David Lloyd	David Lloyd with Alan Lee
2000	Botham: My Autobiography	Ian Botham	Ian Botham with Peter Hayter
2001	Dazzler: The Autobiography	Darren Gough	Darren Gough with David Norrie
2002	From Dusk to Dawn	Fazal Mahmood	Fazal Mahmood
2002	Garry Sobers: My Autobiography	Gary Sobers	Gary Sobers
2002	Mark Waugh: The Biography	Mark Waugh	James Knight
2002	Shane Warne: My Autobiography	Shane Warne	Shane Warne
2003	Menace: The Autobiography	Dennis Lillee	Dennis Lillee
2003	Opening Up	Mike Atherton	Mike Atherton
2004	Cutting Edge: My Autobiography	Javed Miandad	Javed Miandad
2004	Worth The Wait	Darren Lehmann	Darren Lehmann
2004	Basil D’Oliveira: Cricket and Conspiracy The Untold Story	Basil D’Oliveira	Peter Oborne
2004	Third Man to Fatty's Leg	Steve James	Steve James
2004	Playing with Fire: The Autobiography	Nasser Hussain	Nasser Hussain
2004	Straight from the Heart	Kapil Dev	Kapil Dev
2004	Playing For Keeps	Alec Stewart	Alec Stewart with Patrick Murphy
2004	Gazza: The Gary Kirsten Autobiography	Gary Kirsten	Gary Kirsten with Neil Manthorp
2005	Calling The Shots	Michael Vaughan	Michael Vaughan
2006	Out of My Comfort Zone	Steve Waugh	Steve Waugh
2006	The Nice Guy Who Finished First	Rahul Dravid	D. Prabhudesai
2006	Jim Laker: Nineteen for Ninety	Jim Laker	Brian Scovell
2006	Freddie Flintoff, My World	Andrew Flintoff	Andrew Flintoff
2006	Brim Full of Passion	Wasim Khan	Wasim Khan with Alan Wilkins
2006	Bearders - My Life in Cricket	Bill Frindall	Bill Frindall
2006	Twenty20 Vision	Mushtaq Ahmed	Mushtaq Ahmed
2006	Rising From The Ashes	Graham Thorpe	Graham Thorpe
2007	My Story - The Other Side of the Coin	Andy Ganteaume	Andy Ganteaume
2007	Cricket's Philosopher King	CLR James	Dave Renton
2007	Head On	Ian Botham	Ian Botham
2007	Monty's Turn	Monty Panesar	Monty Panesar
2007	Bill Edrich Biography	Bill Edrich	Alan Hill
2007	Portrait of a Flawed Genius	Shane Warne	Simon Wilde
2007	My Turn to Spin	Shaun Udal	Shaun Udal with Pat Symes
2007	The Flame Still Burns	Tom Cartwright	Stephen Chalke
2007	Pioneer Professional	George Lohmann	Keith Booth
2007	Cricket's Troubled Genius	Brian Lara	Brian Scovell
2007	Wasted?	Paul Smith	Paul Smith
2007	Behind the Shades: The Autobiography	Duncan Fletcher	Duncan Fletcher
2008	There's Only 2 Tony Cotteys	Tony Cottey	Tony Cottey with Dave Brayley
2008	Aggressive Master of Spin	Tony Lock	Alan Hill
2008	Starting Out: My Story So Far	Alastair Cook	Alastair Cook
2008	Bickers	Martin Bicknell	Martin Bicknell
2008	Coming Back to Me	Marcus Trescothick	Marcus Trescothick
2008	Out of the Park	Craig McMillan	Craig McMillan
2008	The Definitive Biography	Sachin Tendulkar	Vaibhav Purandare
2008	Line and Strength	Glenn McGrath	Glenn McGrath
2008	True Colours	Adam Gilchrist	Adam Gilchrist
2009	Imran Khan	Imran Khan	Christopher Sandford
2009	Strictly Me - My Life Under the Spotlight	Mark Ramprakash	Mark Ramprakash
2009	The Captain's Tales: Battle for the Ashes	David Fulton	David Fulton
2009	Portrait of a Rebel	Kevin Pietersen	Marcus Stead
2009	Harold Larwood	Harold Larwood	Duncan Hamilton
2009	Hoggy - Welcome to My World	Matthew Hoggard	Matthew Hoggard
2009	Cricket in the Park	Lord Sheffield	Roger Packham
2009	And God Created Cricket	Simon Hughes	Simon Hughes
2009	No Bull: From the Bush to the Baggy Green	Andy Bichel	Gerry Collins
2009	Graeme Smith: A Captain's Diary	Graeme Smith	Graeme Smith with Neil Manthorp
2009	Driving Ambition - My Autobiography	Andrew Strauss	Andrew Strauss
2010	Standing My Ground	Matthew Hayden	Matthew Hayden
2010	Thommo Speaks Out	Jeff Thomson	Ashley Mallett
2010	Blood, Sweat and Treason	Henry Olonga	Henry Olonga
2010	Keeping My Head: A Life in Cricket	Justin Langer	Justin Langer
2010	No Holding Back: The Autobiography	Michael Holding	Michael Holding
2010	Over But Not Out	Richie Benaud	Richie Benaud
2010	No Boundaries	Ronnie Irani	Ronnie Irani
2010	Start The Car: The World According to Bumble	David Lloyd	David Lloyd
2010	Taking the Mickey: The Inside Story	Mickey Arthur	Mickey Arthur with Neil Manthorp
2011	Jack Hobbs: England's Greatest Cricketer	Jack Hobbs	Leo McKinstry
2011	The Last Flannelled Fool	Michael Simkins	Michael Simkins
2011	Peter May Biography	Peter May	Alan Hill
2011	Ian Botham - The Power and The Glory	Ian Botham	Simon Wilde
2011	Fred Trueman - The Authorised Biography	Fred Trueman	Chris Waters
2011	The Breaks are Off - My Autobiography	Graeme Swann	Graeme Swann
2011	A Reappraisal of English Cricket's Most Controversial Captain	Tony Greig	David Tossell
2011	Roo's Book	Bruce Yardley	Bruce Yardley
2011	Don's Century	Don Bradman	Indra Vikram Singh
2011	Controversially Yours	Shoaib Akhtar	Shoaib Akhtar
2011	To The Point	Herschelle Gibbs	Herschelle Gibbs with Steve Smith
2011	The Following Game	Jonathan Smith	Jonathan Smith
2011	Brett Lee: My Life	Brett Lee	Brett Lee, James Knight
2011	Imran Versus Imran: The Untold Story	Imran Khan	Frank Huzur
2012	Return To The Crease	John Pennington	John Pennington
2012	Luck: What it Means and Why it Matters	Ed Smith	Ed Smith
2012	Daffy My Life in Cricket	Phil DeFreitas	Phil DeFreitas
2012	The Test of My Life: From Cricket to Cancer and Back	Yuvraj Singh	Yuvraj Singh
2012	Jimmy: My Story	James Anderson	James Anderson with Richard Gibson
2012	Watto	Shane Watson	Shane Watson with Jimmy Thomson
2012	Tuffer's Cricket Tales	Phil Tufnell	Phil Tufnell
2012	Keeping Quiet	Paul Nixon	Paul Nixon
2012	Jackers: A Life in Cricket	Robin Jackman	Robin Jackman with Colin Bryden
2012	The Valiant Cricketer	Trevor Bailey	Alan Hill
2012	Fierce Focus: Greg Chappell	Greg Chappell	Greg Chappell with Malcolm Knox
2012	My World in Cricket	Stuart Broad	Stuart Broad
2013	Underneath the Southern Cross	Michael Hussey	Michael Hussey
2013	Ponting: At the Close of Play	Ricky Ponting	Ricky Ponting
2013	The Gloves are Off: My Life in Cricket	Matt Prior	Matt Prior
2013	The Test of Will	Glenn McGrath	Glenn McGrath
2013	Bouch: Through My Eyes	Mark Boucher	Mark Boucher with Neil Manthorp
2013	Tony Greig: Love, War and Cricket - A Family Memoir	Tony Greig	Joyce Greig and Mark Greig
2014	Playing It My Way	Sachin Tendulkar	Sachin Tendulkar with Boria Majumdar
2014	KP: The Autobiography	Kevin Pietersen	Kevin Pietersen with David Walsh
2014	Rhino	Ryan Harris	Ryan Harris with Stephen Gray and Jason Phelan
2014	Cricket As I See It	Allan Border	Allan Border
2015	The Test: My Life, and the Inside Story of the Greatest Ashes Series	Simon Jones	Simon Jones
2015	Time to Talk	Curtly Ambrose	Curtly Ambrose with Richard Sydenham
2015	Second Innings: My Sporting Life	Andrew Flintoff	Andrew Flintoff
2015	Phillip Hughes: The Official Biography	Phillip Hughes	Malcolm Knox with Peter Lalor
2015	The Art of Captaincy (30th Anniversary Edition)	Mike Brearley	Mike Brearley
2015	Don Bradman - The Definitive Biography	Don Bradman	Roland Perry
2016	Mashrafe	Mashrafe Mortaza	Debabrata Mukherjee
2016	Mind the Windows: My Story	Tino Best	Tino Best with Jack Wilson
2016	Absolutely Foxed	Graeme Fowler	Graeme Fowler
2016	Six Machine: I Don't Like Cricket... I Love It	Chris Gayle	Chris Gayle
2016	AB - The Autobiography	AB de Villiers	AB de Villiers
2016	Unguarded: My Autobiography	Jonathan Trott	Jonathan Trott
2016	Michael Clarke: My Story	Michael Clarke	Michael Clarke
2016	Resilient	Mitchell Johnson	Mitchell Johnson
2016	Declared	Brendon McCullum	Brendon McCullum with Greg McGee
2016	The Wrong 'Un: The Brad Hogg Story	Brad Hogg	Brad Hogg with Greg Growden
2016	Driven: The Virat Kohli Story	Virat Kohli	Vijay Lokapally
2016	Coach	Darren Lehmann	Darren Lehmann with Brian Murgatroyd
2016	A Beautiful Game	Mark Nicholas	Mark Nicholas
2017	My Family's Keeper	Brad Haddin	Brad Haddin
2017	The Sound of Summer	Jim Maxwell	Jim Maxwell
2017	The Journey	Steve Smith	Steve Smith
2017	A Clear Blue Sky	Jonny Bairstow	Jonny Bairstow with Duncan Hamilton
2018	Imperfect	Sanjay Manjrekar	Sanjay Manjrekar
2018	A Century Is Not Enough	Sourav Ganguly	Sourav Ganguly with Gautam Bhattacharya
2018	No Spin: My Autobiography	Shane Warne	Shane Warne
2018	Moeen	Moeen Ali	Moeen Ali with Mihir Bose
2018	281 and Beyond	VVS Laxman	VVS Laxman with R Kaushik
2019	On Fire: My Story of England's Summer to Remember	Ben Stokes	Ben Stokes with Richard Gibson
2019	Game Changer	Shahid Afridi	Shahid Afridi with Wajahat S. Khan
2019	Sir Alastair Cook: The Autobiography	Alastair Cook	Alastair Cook
2021	Believe: What Life and Cricket Taught Me	Suresh Raina	Suresh Raina with Bharat Sundaresan
2021	Stargazing: The Players in My Life	Ravi Shastri	Ravi Shastri
2022	Sultan: A Memoir	Wasim Akram	Wasim Akram with Gideon Haigh
2023	Faf Through Fire	Faf du Plessis	Faf du Plessis
2024	I Have the Streets: A Kutty Cricket Story	Ravichandran Ashwin	Ravichandran Ashwin with Sidharth Monga
2024	The Showman	Glenn Maxwell	Glenn Maxwell
2024	Jimmy Anderson: Finding the Edge	James Anderson	James Anderson
