= Pat Murphy (sports journalist) =

British sports writer and radio broadcaster

Patrick "Pat" Murphy, is a British sports writer and radio broadcaster.

A former writer for the Birmingham Post, Murphy is referred to in a book he co-wrote as having "reported on cricket and football for BBC Radio Sport for the past 25 years". He has covered twelve England cricket tours. He has written over 40 books and has collaborated with, among others, Imran Khan, Wasim Akram, Allan Donald, Viv Richards and Graham Gooch. He has also written acclaimed biographies of Brian Clough and Ian Botham. He lives in Worcestershire and plays village cricket "to a stunningly mediocre standard."
