= Neil Manthorp =

British-born South African writer

Neil Manthorp is a British-born South African writer. Based in Cape Town, he is best known internationally for his coverage of cricket.

== Biography ==
Manthorp was born in England and emigrated with his family to South Africa at 12 months old. He boarded at Bradfield College. He began his journalistic career as a freelancer in 1986. Returning to South Africa in 1990 as the Apartheid system was collapsing, he set up MPW sports news agency. He has covered over 40 tours with the South Africa national cricket team.

== Career ==
He is a regular commentator for SABC radio and television and has also joined the host radio teams in West Indies, New Zealand, Australia and England. He writes for newspapers and magazines and recently completed his fifth book The Proteas: 20 Years, 20 Landmark Matches marking the 20th anniversary of South Africa's return to international cricket. He commentated for Talksport on the 2018 England tour of Sri Lanka.

== Bibliography ==
- Gazza: the Gary Kirsten biography
- The Beer Drinker's Guide to Losing Weight, (with Paddy Upton), The Penguin Group (SA) (Pty) Ltd, ISBN 0-14-027225-9
- Graeme Smith: A Captain's Diary 2007-2009, Jonathan Ball Publishers, ISBN 978-1-86842-353-8
- Taking the Mickey: the Mickey Arthur biography, Jonathan Ball Publishers, ISBN 978-1-86842-383-5
- The Proteas: 20 Years, 20 Landmark Matches, Burnet Media, ISBN 978-0-9870058-1-6
- Bouch: Through My Eyes, Jonathan Ball Publishers, ISBN 978-1-86842-590-7
