= Alan Hill (author) =

English cricket writer (1928–2021)

Alan Hill (1928 – 5 February 2021) was a prominent English biographer of cricketers.

== Career ==
Hill grew up in Yorkshire, and worked as a journalist, first in Yorkshire, then in London, where he joined Hayter's Sports Agency. He won The Cricket Society/MCC Book of the Year award twice: in 1986 for Hedley Verity: A Portrait of a Cricketer, and in 1991 for Herbert Sutcliffe: Cricket Maestro.

Reviewing Herbert Sutcliffe in Wisden, John Arlott called Hill's biographies "distinguished", "right in subject, treatment and content", and added: "Mr Hill's style is both balanced and unfussy; he knows when to state and when to quote ... he constantly leads the reader to think, thus heightening both his concentration and his interest." Reviewing Daring Young Men for Cricinfo, Rob Steen called Hill "a nostalgist of occasional elegance and vast industry". In Wisden in 2003 Frank Keating said, "Down the years, the diligent cuttings-librarian Hill has been a productive cottage industry, doing the game proud with a succession of fond and important studies".

Alan Hill lived and worked in the Mid Sussex village of Lindfield for the last 50 years of his life. He and his wife Betty, who predeceased him by seven days, had no children.

== Books ==
- The Family Fortune: A Saga of Sussex Cricket (1978)
- A Chain of Spin Wizards (1983)
- Hedley Verity: A Portrait of a Cricketer (1986)
- Johnny Wardle: Cricket Conjuror (1988)
- Les Ames (1990)
- Herbert Sutcliffe: Cricket Maestro (1991)
- Bill Edrich: A Biography (1994)
- Peter May: The Authorised Biography (1996)
- Jim Laker: A Biography (1998)
- The Bedsers: Twinning Triumphs (2001)
- Brian Close: Cricket's Lionheart (2002)
- Daring Young Men: The Story of England's Victorious Tour of Australia and New Zealand, 1954-55 (2005)
- Tony Lock: Aggressive Master of Spin (2008)
- The Valiant Cricketer: The Biography of Trevor Bailey (2012)
