= Ricky Ponting =

Australian cricketer (born 1974)

Ricky Ponting AO
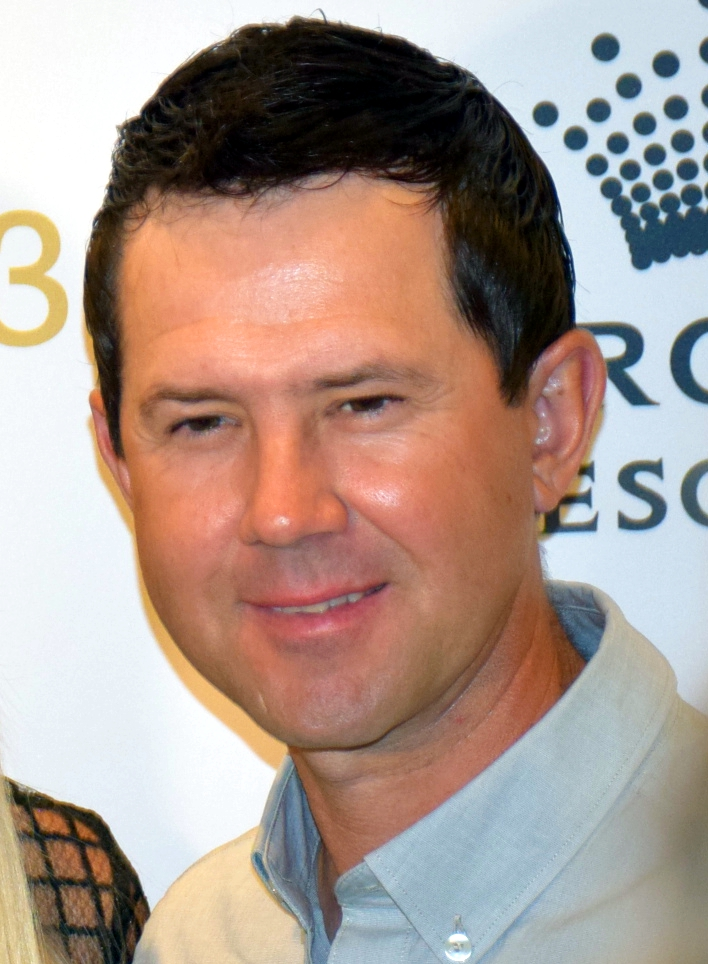
- Ponting in 2015

Personal information
- Full name: Ricky Thomas Ponting
- Born: 19 December 1974 (age 51); Launceston, Tasmania, Australia
- Nickname: Punter
- Height: 175 cm (5 ft 9 in)
- Batting: Right-handed
- Bowling: Right-arm medium
- Role: Top-order batter
- Relatives: Greg Campbell (uncle)

International information
- National side: Australia (1995–2012)
- Test debut (cap 366): 8 December 1995 v Sri Lanka
- Last Test: 3 December 2012 v South Africa
- ODI debut (cap 123): 15 February 1995 v South Africa
- Last ODI: 19 February 2012 v India
- ODI shirt no.: 14
- T20I debut (cap 10): 17 February 2005 v New Zealand
- Last T20I: 8 June 2009 v Sri Lanka
- T20I shirt no.: 14

Domestic team information
- Years: Team
- 1992/93–2012/13: Tasmania
- 2004: Somerset
- 2008: Kolkata Knight Riders
- 2011/12–2012/13: Hobart Hurricanes
- 2013: Mumbai Indians (squad no. 14)
- 2013: Surrey
- 2013: Antigua Hawksbills

Head coaching information
- Years: Team
- 2014–2016: Mumbai Indians
- 2017–2018: Australia
- 2018–2024: Delhi Capitals
- 2024–present: Washington Freedom
- 2025–present: Punjab Kings

Career statistics
| Competition | Test | ODI | FC | LA |
|---|---|---|---|---|
| Matches | 168 | 375 | 289 | 456 |
| Runs scored | 13,378 | 13,704 | 24,150 | 16,363 |
| Batting average | 51.85 | 42.03 | 55.90 | 41.74 |
| 100s/50s | 41/62 | 30/82 | 82/106 | 34/99 |
| Top score | 257 | 164 | 257 | 164 |
| Balls bowled | 587 | 150 | 1,506 | 349 |
| Wickets | 5 | 3 | 14 | 8 |
| Bowling average | 55.20 | 34.66 | 58.07 | 33.62 |
| 5 wickets in innings | 0 | 0 | 0 | 0 |
| 10 wickets in match | 0 | 0 | 0 | 0 |
| Best bowling | 1/0 | 1/12 | 2/10 | 3/34 |
| Catches/stumpings | 196/– | 160/– | 309/– | 195/– |
Medal record
Men's cricket
Representing Australia
ICC Cricket World Cup
| Runner-up | 1996 India-Pakistan-Sri Lanka |
| Winner | 1999 British Isles & Netherlands |
| Winner | 2003 South Africa-Zimbabwe-Kenya |
| Winner | 2007 West Indies |
ICC Champions Trophy
| Winner | 2006 India |
| Winner | 2009 South Africa |
Commonwealth Games
| Silver medal – second place | 1998 Kuala Lumpur |
- Source: ESPNcricinfo, 11 July 2013

Ricky Thomas Ponting AO (born 19 December 1974) is an Australian cricket coach, commentator, and former player. He is widely regarded as one of the greatest batsmen of all time and is the most successful captain in international cricket history, with 220 victories in 324 matches with a winning rate of 67.91%.

He has made the third highest number of centuries in international cricket, behind Sachin Tendulkar and Virat Kohli. He holds the record for winning most ICC tournaments as a captain in Men's Cricket, including the 2003 and 2007 Cricket World Cups, and 2006 and 2009 Champions Trophies. He was also a member of the 1999 Cricket World Cup winning Australian team.

Domestically, Ponting played for his home state of Tasmania as well as Tasmania's Hobart Hurricanes in Australia's domestic Twenty20 competition, the Big Bash League. He played as a specialist right-handed batsman, an excellent slip fielder, as well as a very occasional bowler. He led Australia to their second 5–0 Ashes win as well as victory at the 2003 and 2007 Cricket World Cups and was also a member of the 1999 World Cup winning team under Steve Waugh. He led Australia to consecutive ICC Champions Trophy victory in 2006 and 2009. Combative and at times a controversial captain, statistically he is one of the most successful Test captains of all time, with 48 victories in 77 Tests. As a player, Ponting is the only cricketer in history to be involved in 100 Test victories and was involved in the most ODI victories as a player, with 262 wins, having played in over 160 Tests and 370 ODIs.

A prolific batsman, Ponting is Australia's leading run-scorer in Test and ODI cricket. He was named "Cricketer of the Decade 2000" was named in the country's best Ashes XI in a Cricket Australia poll in 2017 and in July 2018 he was inducted into the ICC Hall of Fame. He is the current assistant coach of the Australian national men's cricket team, having been appointed to the role in February 2019.

Ponting announced his retirement from Test cricket in November 2012, the day before playing in his final Test against South Africa; this was his 168th and last Test appearance, equalling the Australian record held by Steve Waugh. He retired with a Test batting average of 51.85, although he continued to play cricket around the world until 2013.

== 1974–1995: Early life ==
=== Birth and personal life ===
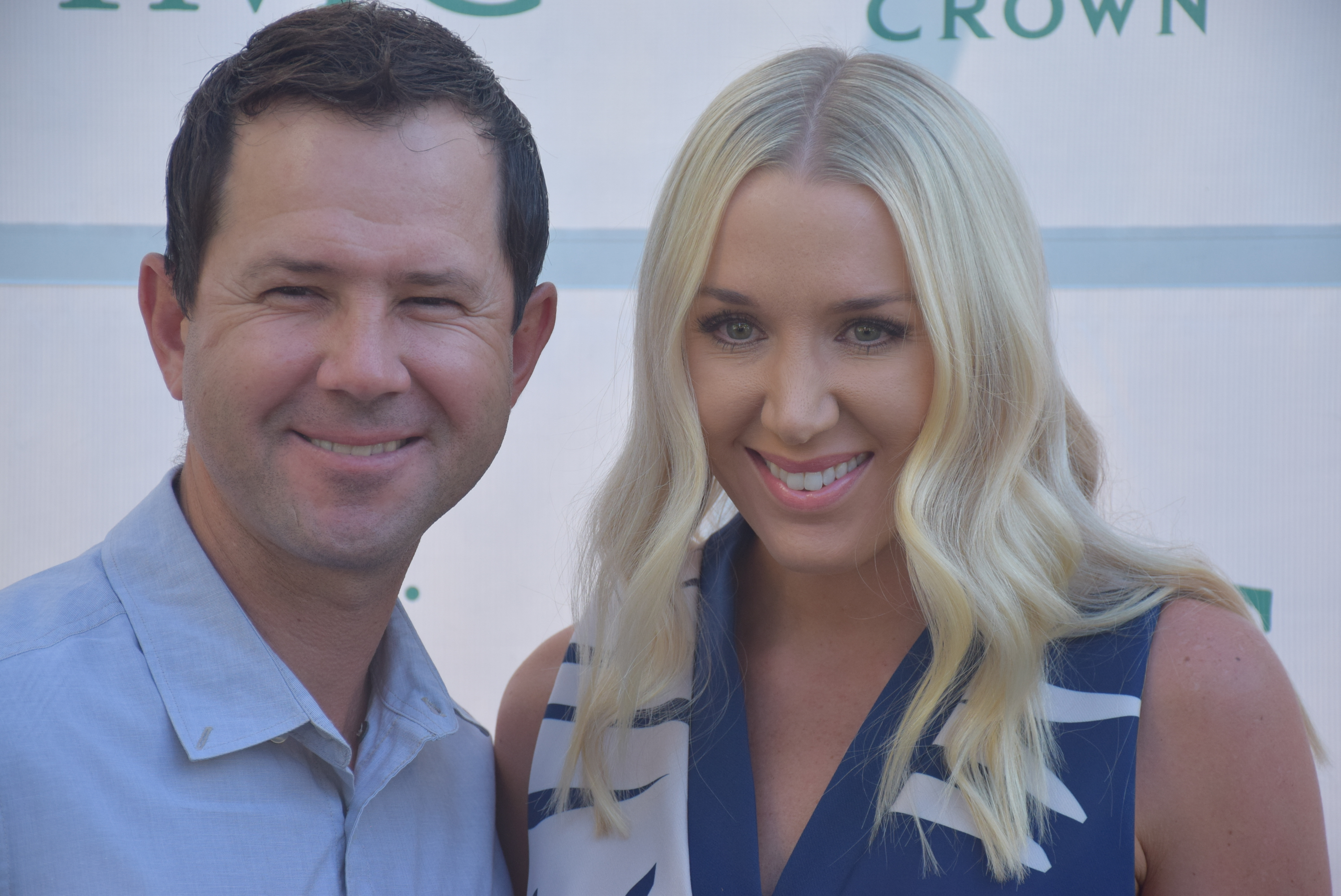
Ponting with his wife Rianna in 2016.

Born in Launceston, Tasmania, on 19 December 1974, Ricky Ponting is the eldest of Graeme and Lorraine Ponting's 3 children. Graeme was "a good club cricketer" and played Australian rules football, while Lorraine was a state vigoro champion. His uncle Greg Campbell played Test cricket for Australia in 1989 and 1990. Ponting's parents first lived in Prospect 4.1 km (2.5 mi) south of city centre; however, they moved into the working-class area of Newnham, 6 km (3.7 mi) north of central Launceston.

=== Junior ranks ===
Introduced to cricket by father Graeme and uncle Greg Campbell, Ponting played for the Mowbray Under-13s team at the age of 11 in 1985–86. In January 1986, he took part in the five-day annual Northern Tasmania junior cricket competition. After scoring four centuries in a week, bat manufacturer Kookaburra gave Ponting a sponsorship contract while in just eighth grade mainly on the back of these four centuries. Ponting took this form into the Under-16s week-long competition less than a month later, scoring an even century on the final day. Ted Richardson, the former head of the Northern Tasmanian Schools Cricket Association said: "Ricky is certainly the equal of David Boon at this level.

Australian Rules football was also a big part of Ponting's sporting life, and is a keen follower of the North Melbourne Kangaroos. In 2024, Ponting’s Wine brand (Ponting Wines) announced a partnership with North Melbourne During the winter he played junior football for North Launceston and up until he was 14, it could have become a possible sporting option. This was before he broke the humerus in his right arm playing for North Launceston Under-17s as a 13-year-old. Ponting's arm was so badly damaged, it had to be pinned. Told to endure a 14-week lay-off, he never played competitive football again.

During Tasmanian Sheffield Shield matches at the NTCA Ground (Northern Tasmanian Cricket Association Ground), Ponting helped out with the scoreboard, thereby surrounding himself with international cricketers. After leaving school at the end of year 10 in 1990, he began work as a groundsman at Scotch Oakburn College, a private school in Launceston. In 1991 the Northern Tasmanian Cricket Association sponsored Ponting to attend a fortnight's training at the Australian Cricket Academy in Adelaide. The two weeks turned into a full two-year sponsorship as he was said to be the best 17-year-old batsman Academy coach Rod Marsh had ever seen.

Playing five games for Tasmania for the 1992 Under-19 carnival in Perth, Ponting scored 350 runs, earning him selection in the 13-man national Under-19 development squad for the upcoming tour of South Africa—the first Australian cricket team to make an official tour to the country since Bill Lawry's team in 1970.

=== Early Australian domestic career ===
Ponting made his first-class debut for Tasmania in November 1992, when just 17 years and 337 days old, becoming the youngest Tasmanian to play in a Sheffield Shield match. However, he had to wait until 1995 before making his ODI debut, during a quadrangular tournament in New Zealand in a match against South Africa. His Test debut followed shortly after, when selected for the first Test of the 1995 home series against Sri Lanka in Perth, in which he scored 96. He lost his place in the national team several times in the period before early-1999, due to lack of form and discipline, before becoming One Day International captain in early-2002 and Test captain in early 2004. After scoring 114 not out in club match against Riverside, Ponting became the youngest player to appear for Tasmania in a Sheffield Shield match, breaking Boon's record by 14 days. In November 1992, with Ponting just 17 years and 337 days, he went to the crease at number four against South Australia at the Adelaide Oval. Despite scoring 56 in a 127-run partnership with Boon, he could not prevent a defeat, scoring just four in Tasmania's second innings. In his first match in Tasmania, this time against New South Wales, Ponting contributed 32 and 18 in a draw. He followed this up with 25 against Western Australia in a narrow loss. His first match in Sydney also marked the debut of future Australian opening bowler Glenn McGrath. His subsequent century also meant that Ponting became the youngest Tasmanian to score a first-class century at 18 years and 40 days, eclipsing Boon's record of 19 years and 356 days. After scoring another half century, Ponting scored back to back centuries against Western Australia on Australia's fastest wicket in Perth. He became the youngest batsmen in Shield history to score twin centuries in a match. After setting a goal of scoring 500 runs in the season, he ended up scoring 781 at 48.81. After season's end, Ponting played seven four-day games for the Australian Academy, scoring 484 runs at 96.70, even though he was still only 18.

Speculation ignited that Ponting was an outsider to join the Australian squad on their 1993 tour to England. Despite Ponting's reluctance to weigh into the debate, Tasmanian coach Greg Shipperd thought he could handle the experience. The selectors ended up choosing Western Australian batsman Damien Martyn for the tour, with Ponting selected in the academy squad captained by Justin Langer, which toured India and Sri Lanka for seven games in August–September 1993. Australian success was limited, with only several wins. No batsman scored a century, despite Ponting reaching 99 not out in a one-day game in Colombo. He finished the tour second highest in the aggregates, behind Langer. Before the start of the 1993–94 Sheffield Shield season, Ponting stated that he wanted to score 1000 runs for the season. In Tasmania's final match of the season, they needed to defeat South Australia outright to qualify for the final. Set 366 in 102 overs, Ponting scored 161 in a 290-run partnership that ended with Tasmania needing just 41 runs for victory. Despite Tasmania losing four quick wickets, they won with four wickets in hand. Disappointingly for Ponting, he could not repeat the performance in the final against New South Wales, scoring just one and 28, as Tasmania were defeated by an innings and 61 runs. The season saw Ponting score 965 runs at 48.25, close to his 1000 run goal.

A month after the final, he was again selected for the academy squad for three limited overs matches against a touring Indian team. Queenslander Stuart Law captained the Australian team that included former Australian keeper Rod Marsh. In Australia's victory in Canberra he top scored with 71 and before scoring 52 in victory in Sydney. The last match was also successful for the home team, with Ponting not required to bat.

Ponting started his 1994–95 campaign with a century against eventual Shield champions Queensland in Brisbane, impressing Queensland captain Allan Border, "He's just an outstanding prospect", Border said. Speculation again arose that Ponting could become a candidate for the upcoming tour to the West Indies. When Tasmania played Western Australia at Bellerive Oval on 4 November 1994, Ponting scored 211. The century was his fifth successive against Western Australia; Sir Donald Bradman is the only other batsman to score five consecutive centuries against another state in Shield history. Ten days after the double century, Ponting was named in the Australian XI to take on England at Bellerive Oval—in a match that was used as practice before the upcoming series in the West Indies. Future Australian representatives Matthew Hayden, Langer, Greg Blewett and Martyn were also selected. In a drawn match Ponting compiled a half-century.

A fourth team was introduced to the World Series Cup in 1994–95—Australia A—for the only time. Australian captain Mark Taylor was not a fan of this change as many fans supported Australia A rather than the national team. Despite the negative feedback it gave Ponting a chance on the international stage. Playing for Australia A, he scored 161 runs at 26.83 with one half-century.

== 1995–1999: Early International career ==
=== Australian debut ===
Ponting's domestic performances were rewarded when he was selected for the Australian ODI team to play in all the matches in the 1995 New Zealand Centenary quadrangular tournament in New Zealand, that also included South Africa and India. Ponting made his debut against South Africa at number six in the batting order. He scored one from six balls, as Australia successfully chased South Africa's target on a difficult batting track. Australia secured another victory in their next match, this time against New Zealand in Auckland, where Ponting scored 10 not out, after coming to wicket late in the innings. His highest series score came in the third International where Australia lost to India in Dunedin. Ponting was promoted to number three in the batting order and responded by scoring 62 from 92 balls. The innings was scored without a boundary and was based on "deft placement and judicious running." The loss failed to stop Australia from appearing in the final against New Zealand in Auckland. Ponting returned to number six and was seven not out when the winning runs were scored. He finished the series with 80 runs at 40 and strike rate of 71.42 runs per hundred balls.

Greg Shipperd publicly suggested that Ponting could be selected as a reserve wicket-keeper for the upcoming West Indies tour, despite not keeping-wicket for Tasmania. However, he had kept wicket in pre-season matches and during centre wicket practice. In any case Ponting was selected as a specialist batsman. "... It was like all my birthdays had come at once. I had some reservations about making my Test debut against arguably the best fast bowling attack in the world", Ponting later said. The West Indies had been cricket's powerhouse for close to two decades and teams included many feared fast bowlers. Before the tour, Australian captain Mark Taylor thought the last Test batting vacancy was possibly between Ponting and Justin Langer. "Ricky Ponting is more the stroke player while Justin is the tough man. It depends on what we need at the time but you can probably say Ricky has his neck in front because he's been on this tour [of New Zealand]", Taylor said. Rod Marsh believed Ponting's attitude and fearless approach could tear the West Indies apart. Nevertheless, Ponting did not expect to be selected. Steve Waugh noted that Ponting would "not be intimidated by the West Indians' inevitable waist-to-chin length." During the series, Ponting said the current crop of bowlers were not "of the same high class" that opposition teams had come to expect from the West Indies.

Ponting was selected for the third ODI on 12 March 1995 at Queen's Park Oval, when Mark Waugh missed out through injury. Ponting—batting at three—was involved in a 59-run partnership with Steve Waugh; however, he was dismissed for 43 when he lifted an attempted pull shot. Mark Waugh returned for the next match and Ponting was subsequently dropped until he replaced an out-of-form David Boon in the fifth and final match, where Ponting got a second-ball duck. In a three-day warm-up match ahead of the Tests, Ponting scored 19, with Greg Blewett scoring a century and Langer compiling a half-century. The performance was not enough for Ponting to force his way into the Test team; though, Australia did regain the Frank Worrell Trophy for the first time in 20 years, winning the series 2–1. When Ponting returned to Launceston in June 1995, Tasmania's TAB announced him as their part-time ambassador. He then undertook a tour to England with the Young Australians; a team that included fellow Tasmanian Shaun Young. It also included five future Test batsmen: Matthew Hayden, Matthew Elliott, Martin Love, Justin Langer and Stuart Law. Despite not batting as well as he "would have liked", Ponting returned to Australia with the fourth highest batting average—48.73.

Tasmania toured Zimbabwe for five games ahead of the 1995–96 Sheffield Shield. Ponting struggled, aggregating 99 runs at a modest 24.75. By the end of October, he had signed a contract with the Australian Cricket Board, along with 22 other Australian cricketers. He opened the batting with Boon in Tasmania's first match of the Sheffield Shield season, scoring 20 and 43. Ahead of the following match against Queensland in Hobart, Ponting set himself a goal of scoring a century in each innings; a feat he achieved in a high-scoring draw. His form continued against the touring Sri Lankans in a one-day game in Devonport, scoring 99. He scored another century against the same opposition in Launceston. During the match, the public address system at the NTCA Ground announced that Ponting was making his Test debut against Sri Lanka in Perth on 8 December. The following morning saw local newspaper The Examiner headline: "He's Ricky Ponting, he's ours ... and he's made it! Tassie's batting star will play in his first Test." Marsh continued his praise of Ponting, who replaced a dropped Blewett. "I have no doubt Ricky will be trying to get 100 in his first Test game. And I hope he does. You'd back him to. If Ricky carries with him the same attitude that he has seen him succeed at First-class cricket to the next level there is no reason why he will not continue to score."

Sri Lanka batted first and scored 251, before Ponting—batting at number five due to Steve Waugh's absence through injury—arrived at the crease with Australia at a comfortable 3/422. He started nervously, edging his first ball past first slip for a boundary from off-spinner Muttiah Muralitharan. When Ponting reached 96, Chaminda Vaas hit Ponting high on his thigh and was given out leg before wicket. Many members of the crowd and media argued it was an incorrect decision due to excessive height. He combined with Stuart Law, also playing on debut, for a partnership of 121. This was only the ninth ever century partnership by debutants in Test cricket. "I've got mixed emotions about my knock at the moment. 96 is a good score but it would have been nice to get a 100", Ponting said after the innings. "Once I struck a few in the middle of the bat, and I spent some time in the middle I tried to relax and enjoy it, just savour the moment." Australia won the match by an innings. In the second Test in Melbourne on Boxing Day, he scored a "compact" 71 in his only innings, combining for a century stand with Steve Waugh. He also took the wicket of Asanka Gurusinha in Sri Lanka's first innings amidst four economical overs.

However, Ponting's performance was overshadowed by Australian umpire Darrell Hair no-balling Muralitharan for throwing on seven occasions, increasing tensions between the two teams. Ponting's fellow Tasmanian Boon retired after the Third Test, and Ponting's performances were not as strong at number six in the batting order, managing six and 20. Australia won yet again, sweeping the series 3–0, and Ponting was in full praise of Boon. "I would have hated to be the first person to come through from Launceston and make it but he has proved it can be done", Ponting said a year before his Test debut. Ponting ended his debut Test series with 193 runs at 48.25.

Though Ponting's appearances for Tasmania continued to be limited, he was still able to top the 1995–96 season averages with 59.50. He played in all ten games of the World Series ODI Cup played between Australia, Sri Lanka and the West Indies after the Test series. Ponting started the series at number four but moved up a position midway through the season, after opener Michael Slater was dropped. He broke through for his maiden ODI century in his 12th match, scoring 123 from 138 balls against Sri Lanka at the MCG. However, the effort was not enough to prevent Sri Lanka from victory. Ponting ended his first home ODI tournament with 341 runs at 34.10, including one century and three fifties, as Australia ended as series champions.

=== 1996 World Cup ===
A Tamil Tiger bombing in Colombo coupled with death threats to some members of the team forced Australia to forfeit their scheduled 1996 Cricket World Cup match against Sri Lanka in Colombo. Ponting batted in the number three position for the entire tournament, and scored six in Australia's opening match victory over Kenya. He continued to be inconsistent with scores of 12 and 33 against India and Zimbabwe, before becoming the youngest batsman to score a World Cup century, when he scored 102 runs from 112 balls against the West Indies in Jaipur. Ponting wore a cap instead of a helmet to show the West Indians that he did not fear them. The effort was not enough, as Australia lost by four wickets. Australia finished second in their group and faced New Zealand in the quarter-finals. He scored 41 followed by a 15-ball duck in a semi-final victory against the West Indies, as Australia staggered to 8/207. Australia appeared to be heading out of the tournament when the Caribbean team reached 2/165, but a sudden collapse saw Australia win by six runs in the last over. Ponting scored 45 from 73 balls in the final at the Gaddafi Stadium in Lahore, which Australia lost to Sri Lanka. Ponting ended his first World Cup campaign with 229 runs at 32.71.

In August, Australia played in the Singer Cup in Sri Lanka, after a five-month break since the World Cup. Despite the political environment being more assured than during the World Cup, Australia still struggled to defeat the Sri Lankans, now full of confidence. Australia overpowered Zimbabwe, before going down the home team. They regrouped and defeated India; however, Sri Lanka defeated Australia, this time in the final. Ponting scored: 53, 46 not out, 0 and 17 for the series. With Boon's retirement, Ponting was elevated to the No. 3 position in the Test team, and his first assignment in his new role came in a one-off Test against India at the Feroz Shah Kotla in Delhi. Foreshadowing his future Test struggles in India, Ponting made 13 and 14 in a seven-wicket defeat. His failed to regain his form in the following Titan Cup involving India, South Africa and Australia. After a "scratchy" game against South Africa, Ponting was rested for the next match against India. Nevertheless, he was recalled for the return match against South Africa, making 17. The series ending poorly for Ponting, being bowled for a duck, as India won the finals. The pair of ODI tournaments on the subcontinent yielded Ponting only 168 runs at 28.00 from seven matches.

Ponting continued in the role for the series against the West Indies in 1996–97 in Australia. After two Test matches and three scores under 10, he was replaced by Justin Langer, despite scoring 88 in the First Test. He was out of the team for six months, and missed the remaining three Tests against the West Indies, the three Tests on the tour to South Africa, both series victories to Australia. Many "experts" thought the decision was unjustifiable. Former Australian coach, Bob Simpson, said: "I really feel that Ricky could have been persevered with. He's a fine young cricketer and he'll now have to prove that he's got the tenacity and temperament to go with it." Ponting's axing meant he had time to regain his form in the Sheffield Shield. Despite struggling at first, he scored twin centuries against South Australia in Hobart, and proceeded to score another ton against Queensland.

Ponting was selected for the 1997 Ashes tour of England, but did not play in any of the three preceding ODIs. He was not selected for the first three Tests; England won the first, Australia the third, and the second was drawn. Ponting was given three one-dayers and First-class match against Glamorgan to try to push his case for a Test inclusion. He scored a century in the latter, but managed just five against Middlesex in the last match before the Fourth Test. Michael Bevan was eventually dropped for Ponting, due to poor form and troubles against the short ball. In his first Ashes Test, Ponting scored his first Test century (127, batting at No. 6). He played the last three Tests and ended the series with 241 runs at 48.20. At the time Australia had a policy of the selecting the same team for ODIs, so Ponting only played in three ODIs in early stages of the 1996–97 season in Australia, scoring 68 runs at 22.66 in December 1996 before being dropped.

Ponting scored 119 runs at 39.66 in the three-Test home series against New Zealand in 1997–98, including a breezy 73 not out from 85 balls in the second innings of the First Test in Brisbane to help Australia set a winning target. He then made his first Test century on Australian soil, scoring 105 in the First Test against South Africa at the MCG. He added a fifty in the next match and ended the series with 248 runs at 49.60. Ponting has his most successful ODI season to date, scoring 462 runs at 57.75 in the annual tri-series, including a 100 against New Zealand and three fifties. The 100 was Ponting's third ODI century, but Australia had lost all three matches. He scored 76 in the third and deciding final against South Africa, which Australia won. In a brief four-match ODI tour of New Zealand at the end of the season, Ponting scored 76 runs at 25.33.

=== 1998 tours of the subcontinent and Ashes ===
Just 10 days after their tour of New Zealand, Australia played in a first-class warm-up match in India, ahead of their three match Test series. Sachin Tendulkar struck a double century in the opening warm-up match as the Australian bowlers struggled to cope with the conditions. Ponting came into the Test series with first-class scores of 53, 37 and 155 behind him. Batting at five and seven in the batting order respectively, he scored 18 in the first innings and two in the second on a "dusty turning track" in the opening Test in Chennai. Despite conceding a 71 first innings lead, Tendulkar struck 155 in India's second innings, as India won by 169 runs. Australia suffered further humiliation in the second Test at Eden Gardens. India—whom amassed 5/633 in reply to Australia's 233—went onto win by an innings and 16 runs, as Ponting scored 60 and nine.

Several days after the match, Ponting was thrown out of Equinox night club in Kolkata. The Indian media reported that Ponting was misbehaving with several women in the nightclub. Ponting was fined $1000 by Australian team management for the incident, and later apologised to staff. Ponting later wrote:

A few of the players wanted to go to a nightspot and so this guy had organised for us to get into a nightclub in Calcutta that was usually restricted to members and special guests. When we arrived at the nightclub this same guy spoke to the doorman. He explained that we were Australian cricketers and after a few minutes, they let us in. What we didn't know was that it was a couples night which meant the only way men could get in was in the company of a female. We were quite happy just hanging out together and having a few drinks, and for me it was a chance to celebrate North Melbourne's win in the AFL Ansett Cup final in Melbourne. Everyone was having a good time and knocking down a few beers and the next thing I knew I was asked to leave by one of the security guys. I am usually the last one to leave a nightclub and I wanted to stay, and there was a scuffle but that is all there was to it. I didn't realise we were the only single guys there. To be honest I couldn't remember half of what went on during the night because I'd had a skinful but I definitely did not assault women in the nightclub. Thankfully I had enough witnesses to prove it.

In the following Test in Bangalore, Australia won their first Test in India for 29 years, despite 177 not out from Tendulkar, which gave India a slender first innings lead. Ponting scored 16 his only innings as Australia won by eight wickets. He finished the series with 105 runs at 21.00 as the hosts took the Tests 2–1.

Despite a poor Test series, Ponting's form in ODIs remained strong. In consecutive tournaments in India and Sharjah following the Tests, Ponting scored 467 runs at 51.88. In addition to three fifties, Ponting scored 145 from 158 balls in the Pepsi Cup against Zimbabwe in Delhi, equalling Dean Jones' Australian record. Ponting also had his first confrontation with Harbhajan Singh, an Indian off spinner who went on to have much success against him. In the Coca-Cola Cup series ODI against India in April, he and Mark Waugh put on more than 80 runs in 12 overs before Harbhajan was introduced into the attack. In the spinners second over, Ponting took him for four then lofted him over mid-wicket for six next ball. The following delivery saw Ponting use his feet in an attempt to get to the pitch of the ball but missed the shot and was consequently stumped. After the dismissal the pair clashed verbally. Ponting wrote, "The Sharjah incident was the result of me being over-competitive but it had the potential to get quite nasty. I was really disappointed with the shot I played [to get dismissed] and when I looked up Harbahjan was right in my face giving me the finger [gesturing for Ponting to leave the ground with his index finger] and really mouthing off. Had he been a few more metres away from me I would have not reacted like I did or at the most I would have given him a bit of lip as I walked past. I just over-reacted to the provocation." Both players were consequently fined ($500) and reprimanded by the match referee, with Harbhajan also suspended for a single ODI as he was adjudged to have breached the ICC Cricket Code of Conduct.

On the subsequent tour of Pakistan less than six months later, Ponting was dropped in favour of Darren Lehmann. The left-hander was perceived to be a better player of spin and a better prospect on the dry pitches of the Indian subcontinent than Ponting. In the first Test starting in October, Lehmann scored 98 in Rawalpindi, as Australia won their first Test in Pakistan in 39 years. Ponting's only Test outing was in a high-scoring second Test draw in Peshawar, when he scored 76 not out and 43 as Lehmann was injured. The match saw Mark Taylor equal Don Bradman's Australian record score of 334, when he declared Australia's innings overnight on 4/599, despite being not out. Ponting was replaced by Lehmann for the final Test.

In between the Tests and the ODIs, Australia were knocked out of the 1998 Wills International Cup, starting in late October, when they were defeated by India in their opening match. In a knockout based tournament, Tendulkar scored 141 in India's total of 307; meanwhile, Ponting managed a 53 ball 41, in a 44 run defeat. In a tournament hosted in Bangladesh, South Africa were eventual victors, defeating the West Indies in the final. He played in all the following ODIs against Pakistan, which Australia won 3–0. In the final match, Ponting scored 124 not out from 129 balls, as Australia chased down 316 with six wickets to spare. He finished the series with 215 runs at 107.50.

When the Australians returned for the home series against England, Ponting was "in the worst run-scoring groove in his first-class career." Nevertheless, he was recalled in place of Lehmann, despite the latter's form in Pakistan. This was explained on the basis of "horses for courses"; it was reasoned that Ponting would be more effective against England's pace-oriented bowling attack. However, Ponting struggled in the first three Tests, scoring 47 runs at 11.75, and Lehmann regained his spot for the last two matches. He had played 22 Tests by the end of 1998, with 1,209 runs at an average of 36.63. Ponting was a permanent fixture in the ODI team throughout this period, and scored 322 runs at 46.00 during the Carlton & United (CUB series) series of 1998–99.

During the CUB series, Ponting was involved in a fight outside a pub in Kings Cross, New South Wales, and earned a three match suspension from the national team. He sustained a black eye in the fight. Forced to front a media conference with the black eye, Ponting admitted that he had a "problem with alcohol," and sought external help to attend to this problem. He also thought that his career was on "thin ice" and he had "overstepped" the mark, along with admitting that the episode may have ended his International captaincy aspirations.

== 1999–2002: The road back to the Australian team ==
Mark Taylor retired from international cricket on 2 February 1999, and was replaced by ODI captain Steve Waugh. Lehmann failed to make much impact in the final two Ashes Tests and was dropped for the 1998–99 tour of the West Indies, while Ponting was recalled. Ponting's ability against pace-bowling helped his push for inclusion, as the West Indies typically relied entirely on pacemen. However, he was unable to force his way into the team in the first two tests, with number three, Justin Langer, and number six, Greg Blewett, cementing their places in the team. Before the third Test, Blewett suffered a hand injury and Ponting was recalled into the team. On a pitch that became increasingly flat throughout the day, Ponting—who came to the crease with the score at 4–144—joined Steve Waugh in a 281 partnership. After Waugh survived one of Ambrose's "more threatening spells", he scored 199 and Ponting 104. He "batted with maturity and even temperament associated with the champions of the game", according to Waugh. Australia collapsed in their second innings to be bowled out for 146, with Ponting scoring 22. Left with a record run-chase in Barbados, the West Indies won by a single wicket, thanks to an unbeaten Brian Lara century. Australia had to win the Fourth and final Test in Antigua to retain the series, after going down 2–1. Ponting scored 21 and 21 not out in the match, as Australia won by 176 runs. The following seven-match ODI series was not a success for Ponting, scoring just 74 runs at 14.80 in five matches. The series was drawn at 3-all and included a tie.

=== First World Cup success (1999) ===
Australia started their 1999 World Cup campaign in England with success against minnows Scotland, before defeats by Pakistan and New Zealand. Ponting scored, 33, 47 and 49 respectively. After the twin defeats, pundits doubted whether Australia could make the semi-finals let alone win the tournament. Australia then defeated Bangladesh with 30 overs to spare, as Ponting batted out of his usual number three spot for the only time in the tournament. In an attempt to increase the run-rate with pinch hitter Brendon Julian, Ponting scored an unbeaten 18 from 10 balls at number four. Ponting scored 20, 23 and 36 in the following matches against the West Indies, India and Zimbabwe. In the last match of the Super Six stage of the tournament, Australia were to play South Africa in a match they needed to win to make the semi-finals. South Africa batted first and scored 271, before Australia slumped to 3/48. Steve Waugh joined Ponting in the middle and scored 22 runs in ten overs. Both then agreed increase the scoring in a mid-pitch conversation. South African all-rounder Jacques Kallis could not bowl because of strained abdominal muscles and the batting pair attacked the replacement bowlers, scoring 82 from 10 overs. They were involved in a 126-run stand until Ponting fell for 69 scored in 110 balls, including five fours and two sixes. Waugh went on to make 120 off 110 deliveries helping Australia win with two balls to spare. The teams met again in their next match, this time in the semi-final at Edgbaston on 17 June 1999. Australia only managed 213, with Ponting contributing a solid 37 from 48 balls. In reply, South Africa started strongly, talking 45 from the first nine overs without the loss of a wicket. However, Shane Warne dismissed Herschelle Gibbs and Gary Kirsten before long and eventually took 4/29 from 10 overs. The last over started with the Africans needing nine runs with one wicket in hand. Lower-order hitter, Lance Klusener, proceeded to score eight runs in the next two balls. Drama followed, as Donald was run-out two balls later, resulting in a tie. Australia qualified for the final because they finished higher than their opposition on the Super Six table. They comfortably accounted for Pakistan in the final, winning by eight wickets, after they were set a target of 132. Ponting scored 24 in Australia's first World Cup win since 1987. He ended the tournament with 354 runs at 39.33.

Australia soon travelled to Sri Lanka for a three-Test series, which they lost 1–0. Ponting was one of Australia's few effective players during the tour and was Man-of-the-Series, ending with 253 runs at 84.33. In the First Test defeat at Kandy, Ponting scored 96 and 51, almost half of Australia's match total of 328 runs. They lost the match by six wickets, partly due to being unable to handle the spin of Muralitharan who took eight wickets. The Second Test was severely interrupted by rain and Ponting scored just one in his only innings. He scored 105 not out in the Third Test in Colombo, his only Test century in Sri Lanka. Despite having a perceived weakness against spin, Ponting played Muralitharan the best out of all the Australian batsmen. He scored 31 as Australia won their inaugural Test against Zimbabwe by nine wickets. In the following ODI series between the respective countries, Ponting scored 288 runs at 57.60 with two fifties.

Ponting started the 1999–2000 season poorly, with ducks in his first three Test innings in the series against Pakistan, including a pair on his home ground Bellerive Oval. He ended the run in style, scoring 197 in the Third Test at the WACA. Australia won the series 3–0 and Ponting proceeded to score 125 in the First Test against India at the Adelaide Oval. He finished with an unbeaten 141 in the Third Test at the SCG, the culmination of another Australian whitewash. Ponting was the leading scorer for the series, compiling 375 runs at 125.00. He brought this form into the initial stages of the following 1999–2000 Carlton United ODI series, hitting 32 and 115, before three consecutive ducks. Ponting, however, ended the rut towards the back end of the series, stringing together 53, 43, 33, 50 and 78, as Australia won the tournament. Along with his impressive average of 40.4, Ponting's strike rate (87.06) was the highest of all recognised Australian batsmen. Perhaps more importantly, Ponting was selected as temporary vice-captain when Shane Warne was unavailable through injury, strengthening his claim for future higher honours. "It's now apparent to me that I'm one being viewed as a future Australia captain", Ponting acknowledged in his newspaper column. "I think it's fair to say unless I was being considered for a future leadership position in the team then someone with significantly more experience, like Mark [Waugh] would have been given the nod to be the team's vice-captain. Despite all his good fortune, Ponting slid into the boundary fence and seriously damaged his ankle during the second final against Pakistan, forcing him to miss the upcoming ODI series' in New Zealand and South Africa. The damaged ligaments required a two-hour operation, with doctors telling him how he would not be able to return to cricket until the next summer. He recovered quicker than expected and by May he returned to the golf course and was given approval to start cricket training. He returned to the international scene in August for a three-match ODI series against South Africa in Melbourne's indoor Docklands Stadium. He made only 60 runs, as the series was tied 1–1, with a tie.

Ahead of the first Test of the 2000–01 season in November, Ponting found form while playing for Tasmania. He scored 233 against a strong Queensland bowling team that included Andy Bichel, Adam Dale and Ashley Noffke. The innings included 37 boundaries and four sixes, and was so dominant, the next highest score for the innings was 61. In the second and final first-class match Ponting played for Tasmania in the season, he scored a more sedate 187 against New South Wales in Hobart, assuring him a place in the Test team, despite Damien Martyn (who replaced Ponting in the team when injured) scoring two centuries for Western Australia. Ponting was overlooked the ODI vice-captaincy, with Gilchrist given the role; however, Ponting captained a Northern Territory XI against the West Indies in the lead-up to the upcoming series. Though not known for extravagant claims, Steve Waugh told a journalist that Ponting could easily be the best batsman in the world, and put him alongside Sachin Tendulkar and Brian Lara. When Jamie Cox was selected for Australia A, Ponting was selected as captain of Tasmania for a domestic one-dayer against Victoria in December. His men won by nine wickets, with Ponting scoring an unbeaten 64 from 69 balls. Australia white-washed the West Indies 5–0 in the Test series; Ponting scored a modest 242 runs at 40.33, with a high score of 92.

=== Defeat in India and 2001 Ashes ===
Injury aside (he missed a three-Test tour of New Zealand in early 2000 after hurting his ankle in a fielding mishap in an ODI Final at Sydney), his position was now secured. Australia toured India in between February and April for three Tests and five ODIs. Australia had not won a Test series in India since 1969. Australian captain Steve Waugh began calling this the "Final Frontier". Australia lost the series 2–1 after winning the first Test, and Ponting finished with just 17 runs at an average of 3.4. He was dismissed all five times by Harbhajan Singh. Ponting had a habit of instinctively rocking onto the front foot and thrusting his wrists at Harbhajan's deliveries and was frequently caught in the bat pad positions because of this.

Despite this recent run of poor scores, Ponting was promoted to the key No. 3 position in the Australian batting order at the expense of the dropped Justin Langer, while Damien Martyn took Ponting's former spot at No. 6, for the very next Test series, the 2001 Ashes tour of England. Ponting began the series poorly, scoring 11, 14, 4, 14 and 17—the first four dismissals all to Darren Gough. In the first innings of the fourth Test, Ponting stood his ground while on 0 after edging to slips and refused to go off the field without a TV replay. Replays revealed that the ball had been grassed and Ponting subsequently went on to score 144 and 72 in the second innings. He scored his 216 runs in only 226 balls. In doing so, he repeated his feat in 1997 of returning to form at Headingley. He ended the series with 338 runs at 42.25. Starting with that 2001 Ashes series he has batted No. 3 in all but four of his Test innings.

The touring New Zealanders were not expected to provide much of a challenge to the in-form Australians during the three-match Test series starting in November. The opening Test in Brisbane, saw the tourists came within 11 runs of victory, before the Test was drawn; partly to do with inclement weather. Ponting scored five and a run-a-ball 32 not out in Australia's second innings, as they pushed for a declaration. After scoring 4, 0 and 0 in his previous Test outings at Bellerive Oval, Ponting broke through with a man-of-the-match performance of 157 not out in the Second Test, before further rain resulted in another draw. The result of the Third Test in Perth was no different, with Ponting scoring 31 and 26. Set a record 440 to win, Australia finished on 7/381 at stumps on the final day, despite half-centuries from Gilchrist and the Waugh twins. He ended the Test season 366 runs at 52.28.

== 2002–2004: Appointment as One Day International captain ==
=== Appointment as One Day International captain ===
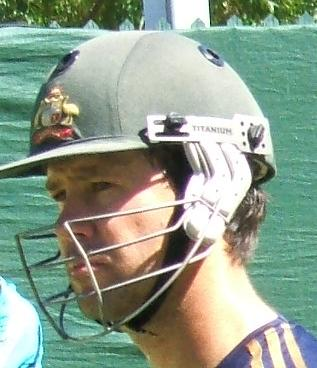
Ponting at a training session at the Adelaide Oval in 2009.

Although the Test team had continued to perform well, sweeping South Africa 3–0 in the home series in 2001–02, the One-Day International (ODI) team suffered a slump, failing to qualify for the finals of the triangular tournament, leading to the dropping of Steve Waugh from the one-day team in February 2002. Ponting was elevated to the captaincy, ahead of then vice-captain Adam Gilchrist. The fortunes of the ODI team revived immediately, and Ponting's men won their first series during the tour of South Africa, defeating the team that had won the tournament which ended Waugh's reign.

Following his elevation to the ODI captaincy, Ponting played a prominent role in the Test tour of South Africa. He scored 100 not out to steer Australia to a four-wicket win in the Second Test in Cape Town, bringing up the winning runs with a six from the bowling of Paul Adams. He struck 89 in the Third Test and ended the series with 308 runs at 77.25 with a strike rate of 76.48. Australia entered the seven-match ODI series without both of the Waugh twins.

Ponting was prominent in the 3–0 whitewash of Pakistan on neutral territory in late 2002. He struck 141 in the First Test in Colombo and 150 in the Third Test in Sharjah to end with 342 runs at 85.50.

=== 2002–03 Ashes victory and first World Cup success as captain ===
England toured for the 2002–03 Australian season, and Ponting struck 123 in the First Test in Brisbane. His form continued with 154 in the Second Test in Adelaide, meaning that he had scored four centuries in five Tests. Australia won the latter match by an innings and Ponting scored 68 in the Third Test in Perth as Australia took an unassailable 3–0 lead. He was unable to pass fifty in the final two Tests and ended the series with 417 runs at 52.12. Australia won the VB series held between and after the Tests. After the conclusion of the Third Test, Australia's 30-man squad for upcoming 2003 World Cup was announced. Steve Waugh was a somewhat surprising omission, despite being unable to force his way back into the ODI team since being dropped after team disappointment in the 2001–02 VB Series. Ponting scored a slow 18 from 30 deliveries in Australia's victory in the opening match of the 2002–03 VB series against England in Sydney. He proceeded to score 119 from 123 balls (nine fours and three sixes) in Australia's second match of the series—again against England, this time at the MCG—sharing an all wicket record Australian ODI partnership of 225 with Adam Gilchrist in the process. Despite a comfortable Australian victory, Warne dislocated his right shoulder while diving to stop a ball. The success continued through the 2002–03 ODI series in Australia. Winning the finals series against England 2–0.

Australia hit trouble on the personnel front in the lead up to the World Cup. Lehmann was handed a seven-match ban for racial abuse, the world's number 1 ranked ODI batsman Michael Bevan was injured, as was all rounder Shane Watson, who had to withdraw from the World Cup. At the time, another all-rounder, Andrew Symonds, had been performing poorly and had been heavily maligned by cricket analysts, but Ponting strongly advocated his inclusion. The selectors granted Ponting his wish, although the decision was considered highly controversial, especially with Waugh campaigning for his recall as an all-rounder.

A few days before the tournament started, Australia were in further turmoil, when leading bowler Shane Warne was sent home after failing a drugs test, and a replacement could not be flown in until after the first match. With Bevan and Lehmann still sidelined, Australia went into their opening match with little choice over their line-up, and Symonds having to play. However, Symonds repaid Ponting's faith with an unbeaten 140 after Australia lost three quick wickets to be in early trouble. Australia beat Pakistan, and gained further momentum by defeating India by nine wickets in less than half their allotted overs in the next match. Symonds continued to put in a series of match-winning performances and continued to be strongly backed by Ponting from then on. Ponting himself performed solidly with 53 against Pakistan and 24 not out, hitting the winning runs to guide Australia home.

He failed to perform in the rest of the group matches including just 2 against Namibia and 18 against England in a poor performance which Australia managed to win just. He began the Super Six stage with a massive 114 against Sri Lanka. This innings included 4 sixes and he was very aggressive. He failed in the rest of the Super Six stage and the semi-final against the same opposition (Sri Lanka). In the Final, they met India, who they had crushed in the group stage. Indian captain Sourav Ganguly controversially sent the Australians in to bat, citing cloud cover, but Ponting's batsmen attacked immediately and put the Indian bowlers under pressure. They went on to score 359–2, a record for a world cup final by over 100 runs. Ponting top-scored with a brilliant 140 not out from 121 balls. India's batsmen could not cope with the target, and were defeated by a record (for World Cup Final matches) 125 runs. "I have had some amazing times and some proud moments in my career, but the events at the Wanderers have topped the lot. Lifting the World Cup alongside 20 other proud Australians ... [It is] without doubt the best moment of my cricketing life." Ponting led his team to a dominant, undefeated, performance in the 2003 Cricket World Cup, winning all 11 of their matches.

Ponting was announced as long-term vice-captain in place of Adam Gilchrist for Australia's away series in the Caribbean starting in April 2003. The first Test was not the first time Ponting had been vice-captain of the Australian Test team however, as he was thrust into the role against the West Indies in 2000 and England in 2001—because of injuries to Steve Waugh. Although Gilchrist had not done anything untoward, Ponting was elevated because Australian selectors wanted him to captain if Waugh was to be injured. This was Ponting's third tour to the Caribbean, and he was rested from the only warm-up match ahead of the Tests. Nevertheless, he continued his World Cup form in the First Test, scoring 117 and 42 not out on a slow and low pitch, as Australia won by nine wickets. Ponting scored his first double century (206) in the Second Test, as he and Darren Lehmann shared an Australian third-wicket partnership record of 315 against a weak bowling attack. Australia defeated the West Indies by 118 runs on the final day—retaining the Frank Worrell Trophy. The Tasmanian's rich vein of form continued in the Third Test, after being rested for a tour match against Barbados. He scored 113 before running himself out, as Australia batted first on a pitch at the Kensington Oval described as the slowest Waugh had played on. Waugh's men proceeded to take a 3–0 series, with a comfortable nine-wicket victory. Ponting missed the final Test, as Australia conceded the Test record run chase of 418; nevertheless, Ponting was still awarded the man-of-the-series award, after ending the series with 523 runs at 130.75.

=== 5,000 Test runs ===
Test cricket record
| | Matches | Runs | Best | Average | 100s | 50s |
| Home | 92 | 7578 | 257 | 56.97 | 23 | 5 |
| Away | 71 | 5360 | 206 | 45.81 | 16 | 17 |
| Neutral | 5 | 440 | 150 | 55.00 | 2 | 7 |

Ponting then scored 10 and 59 as Australia recorded comfortable innings victories in their inaugural series against Bangladesh, played in Darwin and Cairns in the tropical north of Australia in the winter of 2003. In the third and final match of the ODI series following the Tests, Ponting scored a composed century, as he and Michael Bevan put on a run-a-ball 127-run stand.

Australia's cricket summer started in October; a month earlier than usual because of their ODI series in India following their home series against Zimbabwe. Due to the season's early start, many of the Australian players were not match fit. McGrath missed the series with an ankle injury, while there were concerns about whether Australia should be playing Zimbabwe because of Robert Mugabe's regime. The first Test started on 9 October in Perth, as Australia started strongly batted first against a Zimbabwean bowling attack that lacked penetration on a flat WACA wicket. However, Ponting was dismissed leg before wicket for 37, while Hayden went on to break Brian Lara's world record Test score of 375. Australia won the Test by an innings and 175 runs on the final day. In the next Test at the SCG Australia fielded an inexperienced team due to injuries and won by nine wickets; sweeping the series 2–0. Ponting struck 169 and 53 not out, and passed 5,000 Test runs during his first innings century. The Australian number three ended the two-match series with 259 runs at 129.50. In the midst of the lack of public attention and poor crowds, Ponting wrote how he was unsure whether Bangladesh and Zimbabwe should be playing Test cricket.

Australia flew to India two-day after the conclusion of the Zimbabwean series to play in the TVS Cup against India and New Zealand. They opened their campaign on 26 October against India in Gwalior, but were defeated by 37 runs, as Ponting was dismissed for two. Australia played New Zealand in match three of series in Faridabad. An early 9 am start saw New Zealand bowled out for 97, despite Australia bowling 17 wides. Australia comfortably reached the target, losing only two wickets in the process; one of which was Ponting for 12, who felt that he was "in terrible form.". Before Australia's next game, Ponting was named the Wisden International Cricketer of the Year in an award ceremony in Mumbai. Two days later, the city saw Australia defeat India by 77 runs, helped by Ponting's 31. He continued his run without a large score, managing just 16 in the fifth match of the series against New Zealand; however, Australia won a hard-fought contest. He regained his form in a victory over New Zealand in match—scoring 52 in Guwahati. Ponting improved further against India in match eight in Bangalore. After Gilchrist scored his first ODI century against India, Ponting scored an unbeaten 108 from 103 balls, to help Australia win by 61 runs. Ponting hit seven sixes and one four, becoming the first batsman to end up with only one four in an ODI century. Ponting struggled to come to terms with the pitch early, reaching his 50 in 69 balls, before scoring his next 50 in 31 deliveries. After defeating New Zealand, India qualified for the final against Australia. Batting first in Kolkata, Australia managed 5/235, as Ponting scored 36. India were bowled out for 198, leaving Australia victors by 37 runs. He finished the series with 296 runs—the third highest run-scorer—at an average of 42.83.

=== Most runs by an Australian in a calendar year (2003) ===
After making 54 and 50 in the rain-drawn First Test in Brisbane, Ponting scored double-centuries in back-to-back Tests against India, in the Second Test at Adelaide (242) and at Melbourne (257, his career high). He hit 31 not out in the second innings in Melbourne as Australia levelled the series 1–1 and scored 25 and 47 in the drawn Fourth Test in Sydney to end as the leading run-scorer for the series, with 706 runs at 100.85. Harbhajan had been sent home after the First Test with an injury to his spinning finger.

Having also scored 206 at Port-of-Spain earlier in the year, he became only the second player (Sir Donald Bradman the other) to hit three double-centuries in a calendar year. Ponting's 242 against India at Adelaide is also the highest ever Test score by a batsman whose team was subsequently defeated in the match. After Steve Waugh's retirement at the beginning of 2004 following the drawn home series against India, Ponting assumed the Test captaincy. Since 1997 the Australian team has not always had the same captain for Tests and for ODIs, with Mark Taylor and Steve Waugh being dropped from the ODI team whilst still the Test captain.

== 2004–2008: Appointment as Test captain ==
Ricky Ponting was destined to lead his country – I couldn't have handed Australian cricket's ultimate individual honour to a more capable and deserving man. A leader must earn respect and lead from the front, and on both of these counts Punter has undoubtedly excelled. When the one-day leadership duties were passed over to Ricky in South Africa, my main piece of advice to him was, 'Make sure you take care of your own game and maintain your form, because everything else will follow from that.' Since assuming the mantle, Punter has shown himself to be among the top three batsmen in the world in both forms of the game, and has elevated his hunger and desire for runs to a level most can only aspire to.

— Steve Waugh writing about Ponting replacing him as Australian captain

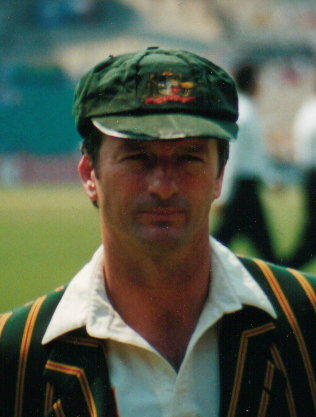
After Steve Waugh's (pictured) retirement at the beginning of 2004 following the drawn home series against India, Ponting assumed the Test captaincy.

Ponting started with a 3–0 clean sweep of the Test series in Sri Lanka. Ponting brought Symonds into the Test team on the back of strong ODI form, rather than first-class cricket, replacing Simon Katich, who had scored a century and unbeaten fifty in the last Test. However, this backfired and Symonds was dropped after two Tests. Nevertheless, it was a far cry from Australia's last two Test campaigns in Sri Lanka, which had resulted in a 1–0 and 0–1 results respectively. Individually though, Ponting struggled, especially in comparison to his efforts in 1999. He scored 198 runs at 33.00, his only effort beyond 30 being 92 in the first innings of the Third Test at the Sinhalese Sports Club ground in Colombo.

Australia hosted Sri Lanka for two Tests during the winter, in the tropical north. Ponting missed the victory in the First Test in Darwin due to a family bereavement, and scored 22 and 45 as the Second Test in Cairns was drawn.

Despite their success at World Cups, Australia continued their failure to win the ICC Champions Trophy. They were knocked out by hosts England in the semifinals in 2004.

After missing most of the tour of India due to injury, Ponting returned for the Fourth Test. By this time, Australia had taken an unassailable 2–0 series lead, his deputy Gilchrist leading the tourists to their first Test series win in India since 1969–70. Leading spinner Shane Warne injured himself on the eve of the match, which was played on a very dry pitch at the Wankhede Stadium in Mumbai. Off spinner Nathan Hauritz and leg spinner Cameron White, who were not regular wicket-takers in domestic cricket, were surprise selections ahead of Stuart MacGill for the tour. The reasoning given by the selectors was that as they intended to play only one spinner—Warne—MacGill was unlikely to play so they would not lose anything by taking some young spinners instead, in order to gain experience. However, it was too late for MacGill to be flown in, and Hauritz played and took 5/103. Ponting made 11 and 12 and Australia lost a low-scoring match in less than two days' equivalent playing time. Ponting was very vocal in criticising the playing surface after the match.

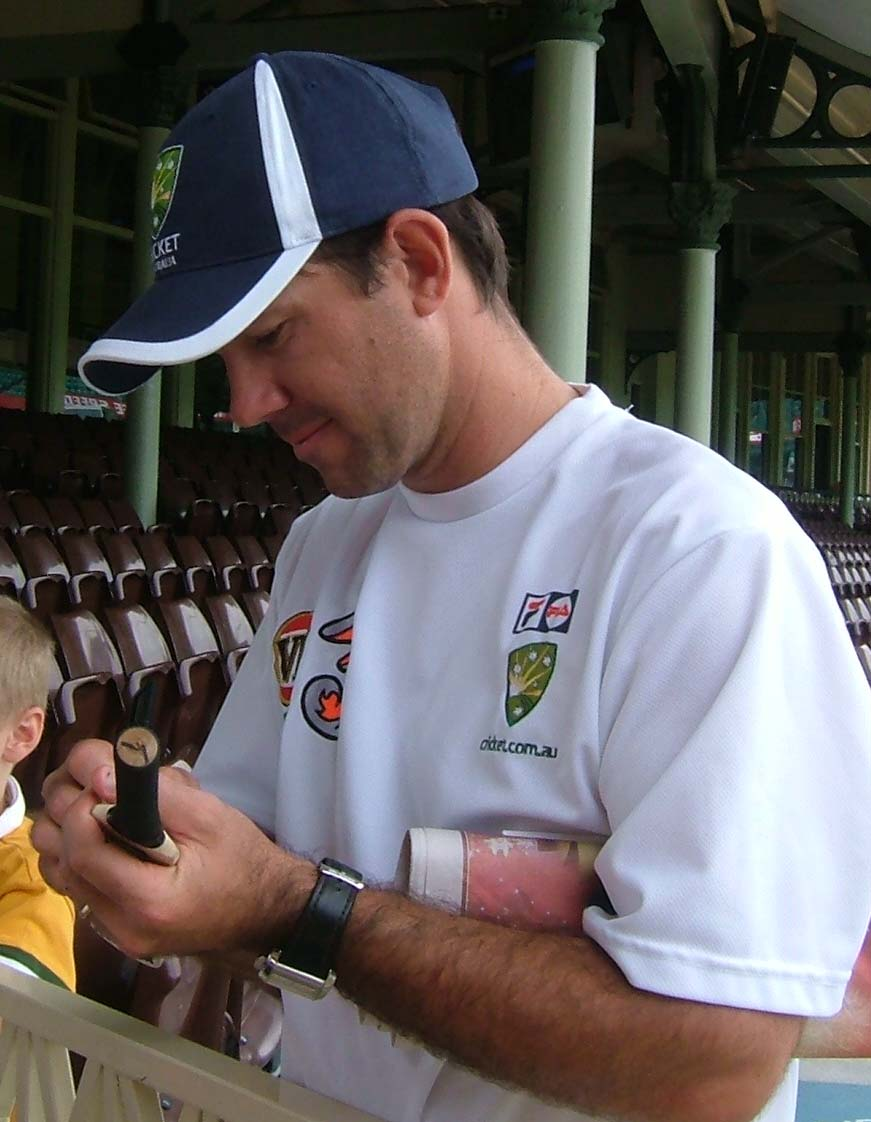
Ponting signing autographs in Sydney, 2005, before he scored his fourth career double century.

Ponting oversaw a successful campaign in the 2004–05 Australian season. They won all five Tests, defeating New Zealand 2–0 and Pakistan 3–0. Ponting scored 145 runs at 72.50 against New Zealand in a winning start to his Test captaincy on home soil. For his performances in 2004, he was named as captain of both the World Test XI and ODI XI by ICC.

Up to this point, Ponting's prolific form with the bat in 2003 had tapered away following his ascension to the captaincy and he had not made a century in eight Tests, a long period by his standards. In the First Test against Pakistan in Perth, Ponting made 98 in the second innings. Australia went on to crush the visitors by over 400 runs. Ponting struck 62 not out in the second innings as Australia won by nine wickets in the Second Test in Melbourne, and then brought up his maiden century as captain, scoring 207 in the New Year's Test in Sydney, which ended in another convincing nine-wicket triumph. He ended the series with 403 runs at 100.75.

Australia then won a three-Test tour against New Zealand away 2–0. Ponting ended the series in style, scoring 105 and 86 not out in the Third Test win in New Zealand. In his first Test series in the country, he scored 293 runs at 97.66.

=== Australia lose an Ashes series for the first time since 1987 ===
Australia lost to England 2–1 after starting the series as favourites. Ponting thus became the first Australian captain since Allan Border in 1986–87 to lose an Ashes series. The 2005 series was hailed as one of the great Test series, but Ponting faced significant criticism afterwards and his tenure as captain was questioned. In his defence, Ponting said that Australia had simply been outplayed and had not stepped up at crucial moments in the matches. He rejected suggestions that Shane Warne should be captain in his stead.

After the first two matches the score was 1–1, having lost Glenn McGrath during the warm-up at Edgbaston and falling short of victory by just 3 runs. England had the upper hand throughout the third Test at Old Trafford, where Australia needed to bat through the last day to force a draw. Ponting scored 156, the first Australian century of the series, and was dismissed only four overs from the end of the day. This left Australia nine wickets down but their final pair survived the remaining overs. In the fourth Test at Trent Bridge, Australia again batted poorly and was forced to follow-on. In the second innings, Ponting was well set on a score of 48, and England was in some difficulty due to an injury to key paceman Simon Jones, when the Australian captain was run out by a direct hit from the substitute fielder (Gary Pratt). Ponting reacted angrily, directing an abusive tirade at the English support team in the pavilion concerning the liberal use of substitutes as he walked into the Australian rooms. England had routinely used substitutes so that their bowlers could receive massages between their spells, but in this case, Pratt was on the field due to an injury to Jones, who had been taken to hospital and would go on to miss the fifth and final Test match of the series. Ponting was later fined 75% of his match fee by the match referee.

Australia went on to lose the match, despite a spirited fightback with the ball on the last day. Also in this match Ponting bowled six overs, and took his first wicket since March 1999; Michael Vaughan caught behind by Adam Gilchrist. The Fifth Test at The Oval was curtailed by rain and although Australia had the English batsmen in danger on the final day, a rearguard counterattacking partnership by Kevin Pietersen and Ashley Giles on the final afternoon secured a draw for the hosts. Thus, the Ashes were lost for the first time in 16 years.

The setback to Australia, and to Ponting as Australian captain, of the 2005 Ashes defeat, was to prove a strong motivation for the Australian camp to improve their standards and overcome any complacency that may have arisen from Australia's being the world's premier cricketing nation for a decade. Prior to the Ashes defeat, Australia's dominance had prompted the ICC to organise a series against a World XI, immediately after the Ashes. Following the Ashes defeat, Australia were expected to struggle against the World XI, but bounced back to whitewash them 3–0 in the ODIs; they also won the only Test easily, Ponting scoring 46 and 54. However, the series was also criticised due to the apparent lack of collective desire of the World XI, who were regarded more as a collection of individuals.

=== Twin centuries in 100th Test ===
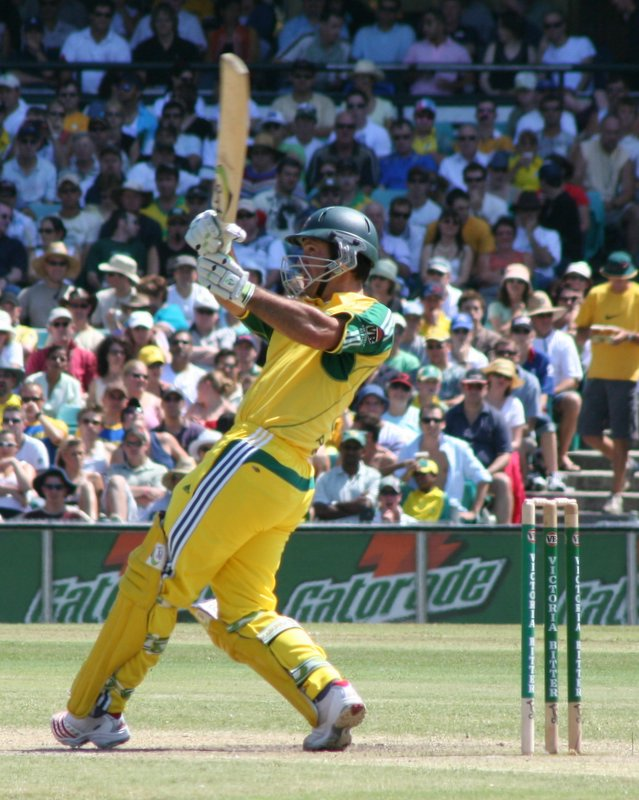
Ponting during his 124 against Sri Lanka on 12 February 2006 at the Sydney Cricket Ground.

Australia were untroubled during the 2005–06 home season—whitewashing the West Indies 3–0 before defeating South Africa 2–0 in three Tests. They then toured South Africa and recorded a 3–0 whitewash in the Tests. In the series against the West Indies, Ponting scored a century in each innings of the First Test in Brisbane, 149 and 104 not out. In his first Test as captain in front of the Tasmanian public, Ponting managed 17 and 0 not out, and he ended the series with 329 runs at 82.25.

Ponting was in a rich vein of form against the South Africans. After scoring 71 and 53 in the drawn First Test in Perth, Ponting scored 117 on Boxing Day in the Second Test at the MCG. Australia won the match and Ponting scored 120 and 143 not out to end the series and start the New Year with a dramatic win in the Third Test at the SCG. South African captain Graeme Smith declared on the final morning of a rain-curtailed match and tried to open up the game in a bid to equal the series. He left Australia a target of 287 runs in 76 overs, and Ponting made 143 not out in only 159 balls to secure an eight-wicket win. It was the first time anyone had scored two centuries in their 100th Test and Ponting was named man of the match and man of the series. He had scored 515 runs at 103.00.

For his performances in 2005, he was named once again as captain of the World Test XI by ICC.

=== Australia's first Champions Trophy victory ===
In 2005 Ponting began using cricket bats with a graphite covering over the wooden blade of the bat, as did other players contracted to Kookaburra Sport. This was ruled by the MCC to have contravened Law 6.1, which states that bats have to be made of wood, although they may be "covered with material for protection, strengthening or repair not likely to cause unacceptable damage to the ball". Ponting and Kookaburra agreed to comply, before the series against South Africa.

Australia continued their run in South Africa even in the absence of McGrath for family reasons. Ponting scored 103 and 116 in the Second Test in Durban, making it three Test centuries in consecutive innings at the ground. He ended the series with 348 runs at 58.00. Remarkably his performance at Durban meant that Ponting had scored twin centuries in three separate Tests between November 2005 and March 2006, as part of 1192 runs at 79.5 in nine matches over the same period.

On 12 March 2006 Ponting scored 164 in only 105 balls in the 5th ODI against South Africa in Johannesburg, as Australia made a record total of 434 for 4, only to be beaten by South Africa's 438 for 9. At the end of the match Ponting was jointly awarded Man of the Match with Herschelle Gibbs. Ponting was not happy with the performance and once in the dressing rooms delivered "the biggest spray" he hoped to do while captain of Australia.

The Australians moved on to their maiden Test tour of Bangladesh thereafter, and narrowly avoided an ignominious loss in the First Test at Fatullah. After the home team took an unexpected first innings lead, Ponting scored an unbeaten 118 in the second innings to guide his team to a three-wicket win. He scored 52 in the Second Test as Australia won by an innings and took the series 2–0.

Australia won the 2006 ICC Champions Trophy in India, finally winning the ODI tournament that had eluded them despite their World Cup success. After the final in Mumbai, Ponting drew some criticism for appearing to ask BCCI president and Indian cabinet minister Sharad Pawar to "leave the podium" and pointing towards the exit with his finger, while his teammate Damien Martyn pushed him gently in the back so that his team could commence celebrations. The issue, while minor, was solved when Ponting issued a formal apology to Pawar.

For his performances in 2006, he was named in the World ODI XI by the ICC. For his performances in 2006, he was named as captain of the World Test XI by ESPNcricinfo.

=== Ashes regained and 10,000 ODI runs at 2007 World Cup ===
In November 2006, the England cricket team again took on Australia in the first Test of a five Test series that was widely expected to be a tremendous contest between Australia, the top team on the world cricket rankings, and the England team, whose aggregated results over the last few years had it standing second in the rankings. Despite Australia this time having the advantage of playing on its own soil, the England team that had wrested the Ashes from the Australians was expected to be highly competitive.

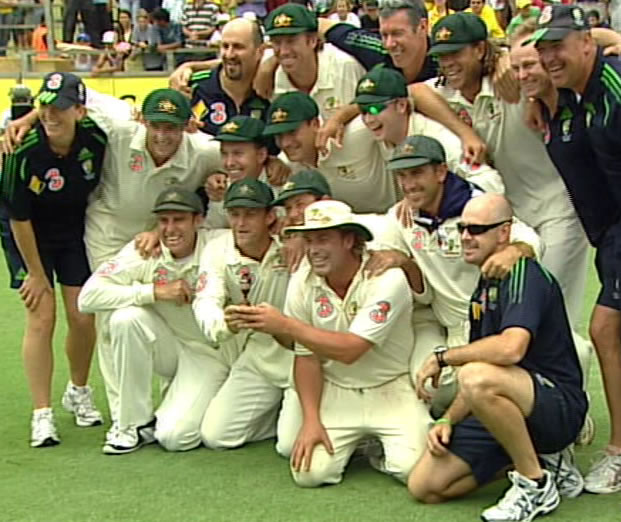
The Australian cricket team with a replica of The Ashes urn

In the First Test in Brisbane, Ponting top-scored in Australia's first innings with 196 runs, and he followed this up with 60 not out in the second as Australia took the initiative with a commanding win. In the Second Test in Adelaide, Ponting top-scored with 142, helping Australia to a total of 513 in response to England's 6/551. Australia went on to win the match by six wickets after a last day English collapse, Ponting making 49 in the chase. At the conclusion of the match, Ponting's batting average peaked at 59.99. The Third Test played at the WACA Ground saw another win to Australia by 206 runs to reclaim the Ashes; Ponting made 2 and 75. The 15 months they had been in English hands was the shortest period either nation had held the urn. Further wins in Melbourne and Sydney, made Ponting's team the second team (after Warwick Armstrong's Australian team in 1920–21) to win an Ashes series 5–0, and that against what had been thought to be a formidable team, the second strongest cricketing team in the world. Ponting was awarded Man of the Series for the 2006–07 Ashes series after scoring 576 runs at an average of 82.29 including 2 centuries and 2 half centuries. For his performances in 2006, he was named in the World Test XI by ICC.

Australia then started the ODI series well, qualifying in first place for the final. However, they stumbled and lost 2–0 to England in the finals. Ponting was then rested for the Chappell–Hadlee Trophy ahead of the World Cup, and in his absence, the Australians were whitewashed 3–0, leading to suggestions that his team had slumped just ahead of the most important ODI tournament in world cricket.

Australia left for St Vincent, Australia's venue for its two warm-up matches against Zimbabwe and England on 28 February without Brett Lee because of ankle damage. In the first warmup game against Zimbabwe, Ponting scored just 2 in Australia's 106 run victory. In Australia's second and last warm up game, this time against England, Ponting again failed to make an impact, scoring just 7 before he was bowled by off-spinner Jamie Dalrymple.

Australia started its World Cup campaign with three group matches played at Warner Park, St Kitts. Ponting himself began successfully with an innings of 113 from 93 deliveries that included five sixes, as Australia were dominant in 203-run victory against Scotland. Despite scoring just 23 in the next match against the Netherlands, Australia still amassed 358 and proceeded to win by 229 runs. In their next match against South Africa, Australia amassed 377/6—their highest score in World Cups. Ponting also scored 91 from 91 balls, and became the seventh player to score 10,000 ODI runs. Despite South Africa being 160 without loss in the 21st over, they crumbled, losing 9 wickets for just 74 runs.

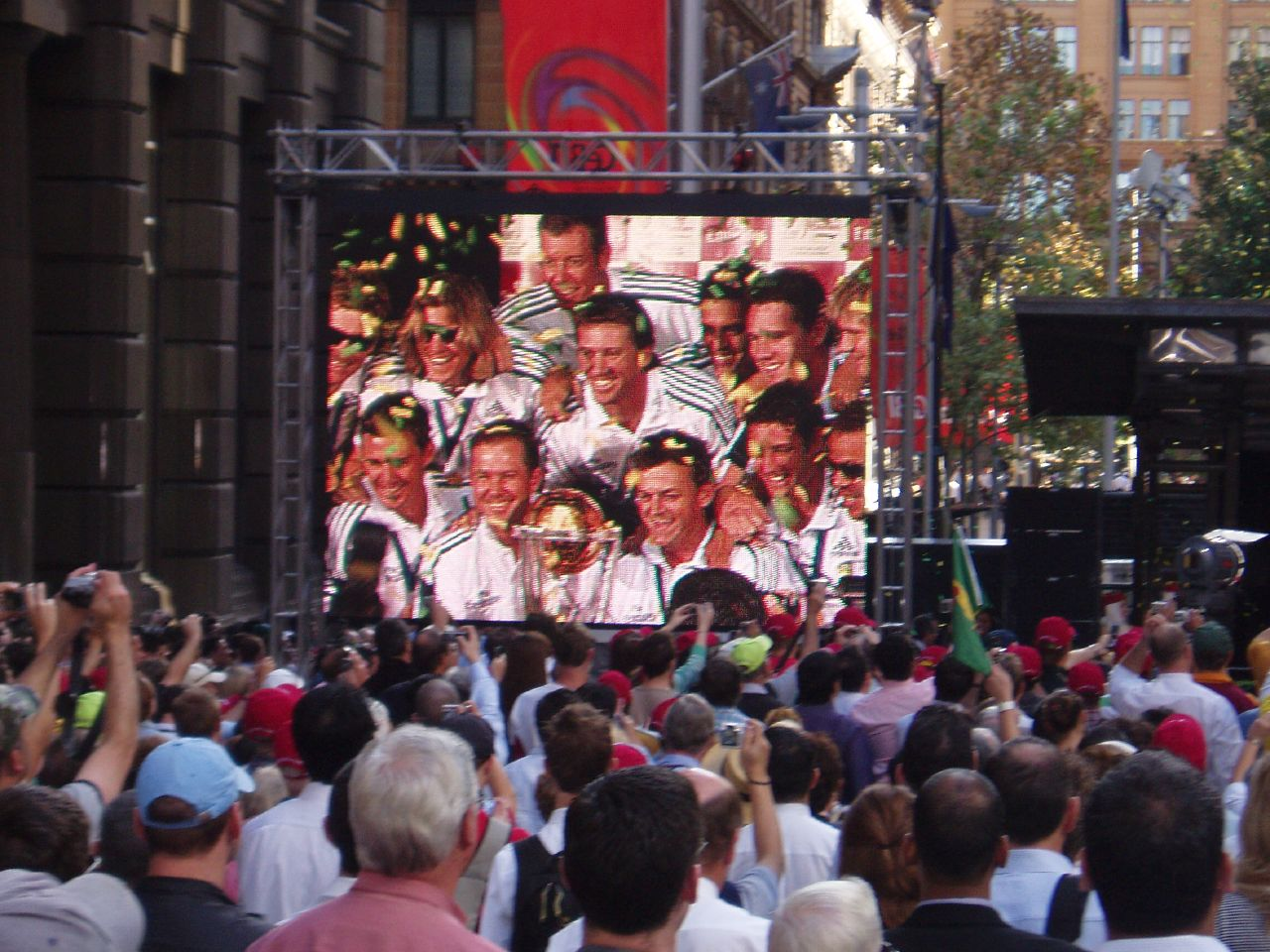
A large crowd of over 10,000 fans welcome the Australian team on completing the first World Cup hat-trick – Martin Place, Sydney.

Australia comfortably qualified for the Super Eights with their first match played at the new Sir Vivian Richards Stadium in Antigua. Ponting stated that he was not very impressed with the outfield labelling it "ridiculously sandy". The Australian captain was run out when on 35, with his team amassing 322 mainly thanks to 158 from Hayden. In a match spread out over two days, Australia comfortably defeated the home team by 103 runs. In their next match, Australia come up against lowly Bangladesh in another rain interrupted affair. This time the match was shortened to 22 overs per side. In the end Australia won by 10 wickets with Ponting not getting a chance to bat. In their next match against England, again in Antigua, Ponting scored a half-century, guiding Australia to a seven-wicket victory. After not getting a bat in Australia's rout of Ireland in Barbados, Ponting steered Australia to victory in their next match against Sri Lanka in Grenada, with 66 not out. Grenada was again the venue for Australia's final super eights match, this time against New Zealand. Again amongst the runs, Ponting produced a fluent 66 that included seven boundaries, with his team wrapping up their biggest victory of the tournament. With his men now firm favourites for the tournament, they again came up against South Africa in the semi-final. South Africa, who were reeling at 27/5, ended up setting Australia 150 to win. Although Ponting scored 22, Australia easily dispatched South Africa by 7 wickets. He was named as captain of the 'Team of the Tournament' by ESPNcricinfo.

For his performances in 2007, he was named in the World ODI XI by the ICC and ESPNcricinfo.

=== Sydney Test controversy ===
The 2007–08 started a new era for Australia, as McGrath and Warne had both retired at the end of the previous Ashes series. The pair had taken more than 1250 Test wickets between them, and the only three Test defeats that Australia had suffered under Ponting, once against India in Mumbai in 2004 and the two against England in 2005, had all occurred when one of the two were injured. Now that both had gone, critics wondered whether Australia and Ponting could maintain their success with their two main strike weapons absent. Australia had not played a Test since the Ashes, while being involved in 32 ODIs and eight Twenty20 Internationals. The period started well for Australia; winning the first Test against Sri Lanka in Brisbane by an innings and 40 runs. Ponting struck 56 from 84 balls (seven fours) in Australia's total of 551. The Second Test in Hobart, saw Ponting score 31 (66 balls) and 53 not out (2 fours and a six) in front of his home crowd, as Australia wrapped up the series 2–0. Ponting scored 140 runs at 70 and took three catches. For his performances in 2007, he was named as captain once again in the World Test XI by ICC.

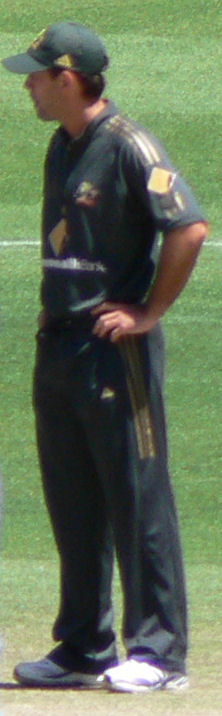
Ponting at the toss for an ODI against India at the Melbourne Cricket Ground.

The series against India however, was much harder-fought. Australia won the First Test easily, by 337 runs, but the matches thereafter were more difficult. The Second Test was closely fought and ended in Australian victory minutes before the end of play. This saw Australia equal the world record of 16 consecutive Test wins; Ponting, was part of Steve Waugh's team that set the previous record in 1999–2001. The cricket though was overshadowed by player conduct issues.

After the match ended the stadium erupted in cheering as the Indians walked off the field, and the Australians celebrated their record-equalling win. The Australian team did not shake hands with Indian players on the field, especially Kumble who was waiting there after the fall of the final wicket. Though the Australian and Indian teams shook hands before heading into the dressing rooms later, but Kumble, who was batting at the end of the match, showed his displeasure by not shaking hands with the umpires. India expressed their resentment by boycotting the post-match presentation ceremony. In the post-match press conference, Anil Kumble summed up his view of the game by stating, "Only one team is playing in the spirit of the game" – a statement that alluded to Australian captain Bill Woodfull's leaked private admonishment of English manager Sir Pelham Warner during the 1932–33 Bodyline series. Chetan Chauhan, India's team manager said his players were "agitated and upset by... the incompetent umpires here... [and hoped] that they will not officiate again in the series". Ponting was questioned over the wrong decision, the racism row, and especially the wicket of Ganguly during which he held his finger up to indicate to Mark Benson that Ganguly has been caught. Ponting was aggressive towards the Indian journalists, lashing out at them for "questioning my [Ponting's] integrity". The Australian players faced much questioning as a result of the fallout of the incident. The Australian team maintained that they play hard but fair. In regards to the racism issue, Ponting denied he did anything wrong by singularly reporting Harbhajan Singh for being abusive. Ponting stated that he was obligated to refer any incidents of racism to officials as it is widely agreed that racism is unacceptable anywhere in the world. After criticism of the Australian team in multiple media continued, a shocked Ponting promised to ensure that his team's conduct is not seen to be arrogant in future matches. Peter Roebuck, a columnist in The Sydney Morning Herald, branded Ponting as "arrogant" and insisted that be stripped of the captaincy.

In the early part of the Test series against India, Ponting continued to struggle against Harbhajan, falling to him three consecutive times in the first two Tests. On the third occasion, Ponting was again caught at bat pad, from the first ball that Harbhajan bowled to him, prompting the bowler to celebrate raucously. Harbhajan missed the Third Test and upon his return in the fourth Test, Ponting broke through for his first Test century against India in matches involving Harbhajan, scoring 140. However, the second half of the series was less successful for Australia as a team; India won the Third Test, ending the Australian streak, and the Fourth Test was a high-scoring draw. The Adelaide Test aside, Ponting had an otherwise unproductive season, scoring 268 runs at 38.28.

In the Commonwealth Bank series, Ponting struggled until Australia's last round robin match against India where he and another poor performing Australian batsmen, Andrew Symonds put on a 100 run partnership with Ponting making a hundred and Symonds making 50. Australia won two of their three-round robin matches against the Indians, but the tables were turned in the finals, which the tourists won 2–0.

=== Third Australian to score 10,000 Test runs ===
The tour of the West Indies was the first overseas Test series for Australia in 25 months, and the first for Ponting's new look bowling attack. In five previous Test series in 1999 and 2003, he averaged 98.71, with four hundreds. He also averaged 42.80 in 25 ODIs from four tours—1995, 1999, 2003 and the 2007 World Cup. After eight months of consecutive cricket from the World Twenty20, Ponting was surprised about how good he was feeling, despite believing that he would be weary from the amount of cricket he had played. In the only warm up match before the series—against a Jamaican XI, the Australians drew controversy from various sections of the media as they chose to wear a sponsors cap over the traditional Baggy Green cap. This was because wicket–keeper Brad Haddin did not want to receive a Baggy Green as he was yet to play in a Test. The rest of the team decided they wanted to look uniform although they wore their Baggy Greens in Jamaica's second innings. Ponting scored 17 in the first innings and 20 not out in the second, as a storm prevented an Australian victory.

After winning the toss and electing to bat in the First Test in Kingston, Jamaica, Ponting recorded his 35th Test century and was eventually dismissed for 158 from 224 balls. Despite forcing their way back into contention, the West Indies were defeated by 95 runs. In the Second Test, Ponting became the seventh player and third Australian to score 10,000 Test runs. It took Ponting 118 Tests and 196 innings to achieve the feat, one slower than Tendulkar and Lara. He was dismissed in the following over for 65. Ponting scored 38 in Australia's second innings, as the match ended in a draw. Australia won the third Test, and the Australian captain ended the series with 323 runs at 53.83. Although Australia won the three–Test series handsomely, with a 2–0 margin, they were to face stronger opposition overseas, in the next year. Difficulties were also beginning to appear in the spin department. MacGill, who had taken over 200 wickets in his career despite playing only sporadically due to the presence of Warne, suffered a loss of form and decided to retire during the series. Brad Hogg, the regular ODI spinner had also retired prior to the series, and Beau Casson made his debut in the final Test.

After not batting in Australia's Twenty20 loss in Bridgetown, Ponting was rested for the List A 50-over game against the University of West Indies Vice Chancellor's XI. He returned for the first three ODIs and scored just 87 runs at 29.00, notching up his 300th ODI during the 2nd match. Ponting scored 69 in the third match, before returning home because of a wrist injury. Under the captaincy of Michael Clarke in the final two games, Australia swept the series 5–0.

== 2008–2011: Decline in form ==
=== Mixed team performances ===
In 2008, Ponting led the Australians back to India and was under pressure following the confrontations during the Indian tour of Australia earlier in the year. He acknowledged that he was keen to rectify his poor Test batting record in India. In the First Test on a turning pitch in Bangalore, Ponting brought up his first Test century in India, 123 on the first day, although he eventually fell leg before wicket to Harbhajan. Australia had the hosts seven wickets down in their first innings, still more than 320 runs in arrears, but India recovered to salvage a draw after a rearguard effort.

In the Second Test in Mohali. Australia were defeated by 320 runs and Ponting was criticised for using part-timer bowlers against the free-scoring Indian batsmen in the second innings, because of a slow over-rate, which is can be penalised by a fine, or in severe instances, a ban to the captain. This meant that he was not able to use pace spearhead Brett Lee significantly.

The Third Test in Delhi saw a flat pitch, where India scored 7/613 in its first innings in which Ponting resorted to bowling himself for two overs. Ponting amassed 87 in Australia's first innings score of 577. The match ended in a draw and Australia needed to win in the Fourth Test in Nagpur to retain the Border-Gavaskar Trophy. On the fourth afternoon of the Fourth Test, the Indian batting collapsed, and Australia had an opportunity to bowl them out and chase a target of around 250–300 after the tea break. However, the Australians were a long way behind on their over rate, so in order to avoid a one match suspension, Ponting chose to bowl their part-time spinners and medium pacers such as Michael Clarke, Cameron White and Mike Hussey (who were all unsuccessful in capturing a wicket), as they took less time. In the meantime, captain MS Dhoni and Harbhajan both added half centuries. This drew strong criticism from many commentators, who suggested that their faster bowlers, who had been responsible for the collapse, could have bowled from a shorter run-up. When the fast bowlers were reintroduced, the last four wickets fell quickly. This left Australia chasing 382 runs for victory and they lost by 172 runs to cede the series 2–0. In the first innings, Ponting became Harbhajan's 300th Test wicket and the Australian captain ended the series with 264 runs at 37.71. While below his career standards, it was substantially better than his previous Test efforts in India.

Fined in India for a slow over rate, Ponting failed to redress the matter during the subsequent home series against New Zealand, when match referee Chris Broad dealt a second successive fine for being three overs behind in the First Test: Ponting was stripped of thirty per cent of his A$12,750 match fee, twice the punishment of his teammates in accordance with International Cricket Council rules for captains. Australia were largely untroubled by New Zealand, sweeping both Tests. Ponting scored only 100 runs at 33.33.

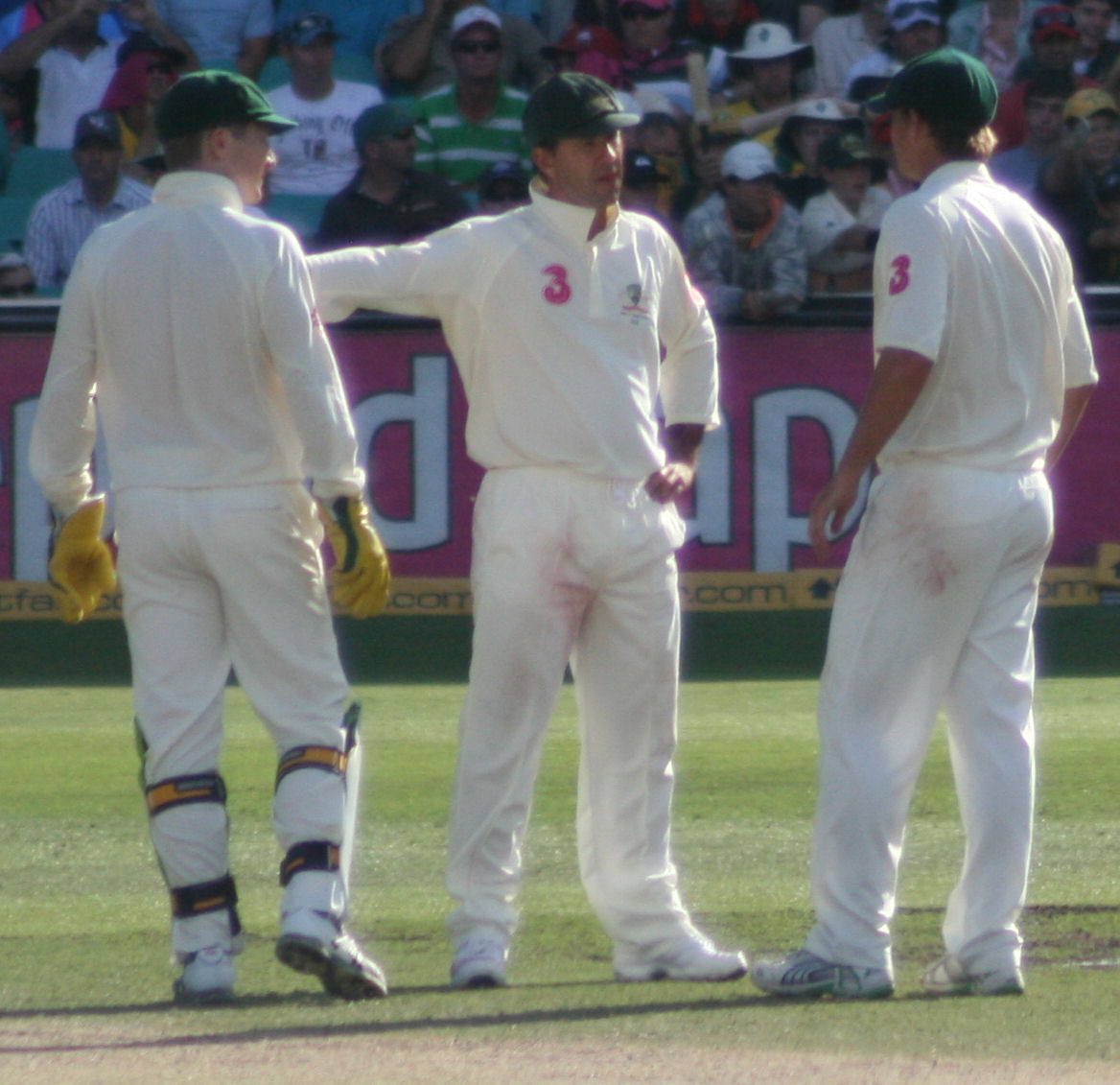
Ponting with Brad Haddin (left) and Nathan Hauritz (right) in the Third and final Test against South Africa in Sydney, January 2009

In the first Test against South Africa in Perth, starting in December, Ponting again had to reduce his reliance on his preferred pace bowlers, and rely more on spinners due to a slow over rate. His persistent problems with the over rate prompted some commentators to criticise him for spending too much time during the match conferring with bowlers. In the first innings he scored a duck, and managed 32 in Australia's second innings. Ponting's inexperienced attack had trouble dismissing the opposition batsmen, and South Africa made 4/414, the second highest successful runchase in history to win by six wickets on the final day.

Ponting experienced a form slump for much of 2008, albeit in comparison to his usually high standards. However, he again exceeded 1,000 runs in the calendar year. Ponting scored his 37th century in the first innings of the Second Test against South Africa on Boxing Day, and followed that with 99 in the second innings, seemingly a lone stand against the South African bowling attack. The tourists won the match by nine wickets to win the series. Australia thus lost their first home Test series since 1992–93. Australia lost the series 2–1, the first time South Africa had won a Test series against Australian since 1970, and the first on Australian soil. Ponting totalled 285 runs at 47.50 for the series.

With the retirement of experienced opening batsman Matthew Hayden—who was replaced by the uncapped 20-year-old Phillip Hughes—the Australian team that toured South Africa in February, March and April 2009 was its most inexperienced since the defections to World Series Cricket. This was further compounded by the loss of Andrew Symonds to injury, who was replaced by the uncapped Marcus North. The bowling attack also required major changes, due to the injuries to Brett Lee and Stuart Clark. Subsequently, paceman Mitchell Johnson was the only bowler with more than four Tests heading into the series. Of the First Test team, Hughes, North, Ben Hilfenhaus, Peter Siddle and Andrew McDonald had only five Tests between them, with the former three making their debut. Ponting's team took the series 2–1, so Australia maintained their No. 1 Test ranking. Ponting was praised for cobbling together an unexpected win, as South Africa were thought to be stronger on home soil. He scored eighties in the first two Tests, ending with 210 runs at 35.00.

For his performances in 2008, he was named as captain once again of the World ODI XI by the ICC.

=== Second Ashes series loss as captain ===
After losing their opening match of the 2007 World Twenty20 to Zimbabwe, Ponting's men were looking for a more positive start to the 2009 edition in England. They opened their campaign in early June against a West Indian outfit that had recently been whitewashed 2–0 in the Test series against England. However, Ponting made a second ball duck in Australia's seven wicket defeat. They played Sri Lanka in their next match, this time at Trent Bridge in Nottingham. Ponting hit five boundaries on his 25 before he was bowled trying the run-rate, before Sri Lanka won by six wickets. The defeat consequently eliminated Australia from the tournament.

In Australia's two drawn warm-up matches ahead of the 2009 Ashes, Ponting struggled to adjust to the English conditions, somewhat, with a highest score of 71. Nevertheless, he started the Ashes series strongly, scoring 150 in the First Test in Cardiff. In his 38th hundred and eighth in an Ashes series, the Australian number three batsman became just the fourth man to score 11,000 runs in Test cricket. The match ended in a draw and Ponting drew criticism for failing to bowl fast-bowler Ben Hilfenhaus while England's last-wicket pair of Monty Panesar and Jimmy Anderson were batting to save the match. Ponting could only manage two and 38, as Australia were defeated in the second Test at Lord's—their first Test defeat at the venue since 1934. On 31 July, during the Third Test at Edgbaston, Ponting became the highest Australian run-scorer in the history of Test cricket, overtaking former Australian captain Allan Border's total of 11,174 in his first-innings score of 38. The match was eventually drawn, partly due to poor weather.

... It takes three ingredients to make a great player – determination, courage and skill – and he's got all three in abundance. He's also developed into a great leader. Players really enjoy playing for him and that's sometimes a difficult trait to bring out in people. You can tell by the way the team respond to him that his leadership skills are among the finest. Combine this with his batting skill and that's a pretty intimidating package.

— Allan Border

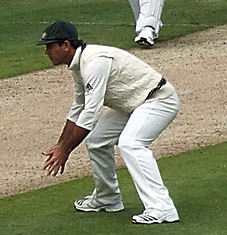
Ponting fielding during First Test in Cardiff

Australia went on to lose the series 2–1 and Ponting became only the third Australian captain to lose the Ashes twice. Despite not being a selector, Ponting was heavily criticised for Australia not playing Hauritz and his apparent reluctance to put faith in his spinners. He was questioned, particularly on Australia's recent habit of often not playing a specialist/regular spinner. Instances of these were the first three Tests in India, the omission of Krejza for the First Test against New Zealand immediately after taking 12 wickets on debut, and opting for no spinner in the first two Tests in South Africa.

On 7 September 2009, Ponting announced his retirement from Twenty20 international cricket in order to prolong his career. He was succeeded as Australian Twenty20 captain by team vice-captain Michael Clarke.

Australia came into the Champions Trophy ranked second in ODIs; along with being the events reigning champions. They opened their campaign against an undermanned West Indian outfit who were without prominent players because of an industrial dispute. On a "lively pitch", Ponting top-scored with 79, after reaching his half-century in 63 balls. He hit opening bowler and future nemesis, Kemar Roach, for four boundaries in the seventh over of the match, and scored a six and two fours against the fast-bowler when he was reintroduced into the attack in the 21st over. The innings set up Australia's comfortable 50-run victory. Australia next match against India was abandoned due to rain. Before the weather intervened Ponting had scored 65 from 85 deliveries, before being run out. The result meant Australia needed to defeat Pakistan in their third and final group match for a place in the semi-finals. Though Australia collapsed when Ponting was dismissed for a patient 32 in pursuit of low total they won by two wickets.

Australia defeated England by nine wickets in their semi-final, with Ponting scoring an unbeaten 111 from 115 deliveries (12 fours and one six); his 28th ODI century. During the innings, Ponting became the third batsman to score 12,000 ODI runs and was also involved in a record 252-run partnership with Watson—Ponting's seventh double-century stand for Australia in the format; the only player to achieve this feat. Despite Ponting's score of only one in the final in Centurion against New Zealand, Australia won by six wickets—their second consecutive Champions Trophy victory. Ponting was presented with the golden bat award for most runs in the tournament—288 at an average of 72 in four games—and also received the man-of-the-series award, before praising his young team for the title defence.

Australia proceeded to tour India for seven ODIs starting in mid-October and ending in early November. In the opening match, Ponting top-scored for Australia with 74 from 85 balls, as his team narrowly escaped defeat. Ponting made just 12 in India's comprehensive victory in the second match, while he scored a slow 59 from 93 balls (four boundaries) in another Indian victory in the third match. The Australian captain stuck a more fluent innings of 52, scored in 59 deliveries in the following fixture. Australia amassed their biggest total of the series in the fifth match, with Ponting contributing a run-a-ball 45. A slow, low, turning wicket was presented to the teams for the sixth ODI in Guwahati. Ponting fought his way to 25 from 57 balls, before falling to Harbhajan, as Australia comfortably chased down India's total of 170 with six wickets remaining. The final match in Mumbai was washed out after a cyclone formed over the Arabian Sea; securing a 4–2 series victory to the injury depleted Australians. "It's probably one of the best one-day series I have ever been involved in, with all the injuries and setbacks at the start of this tour", Ponting said. He ending the series with 267 runs at 44.50.

=== Troubles against the short ball ===
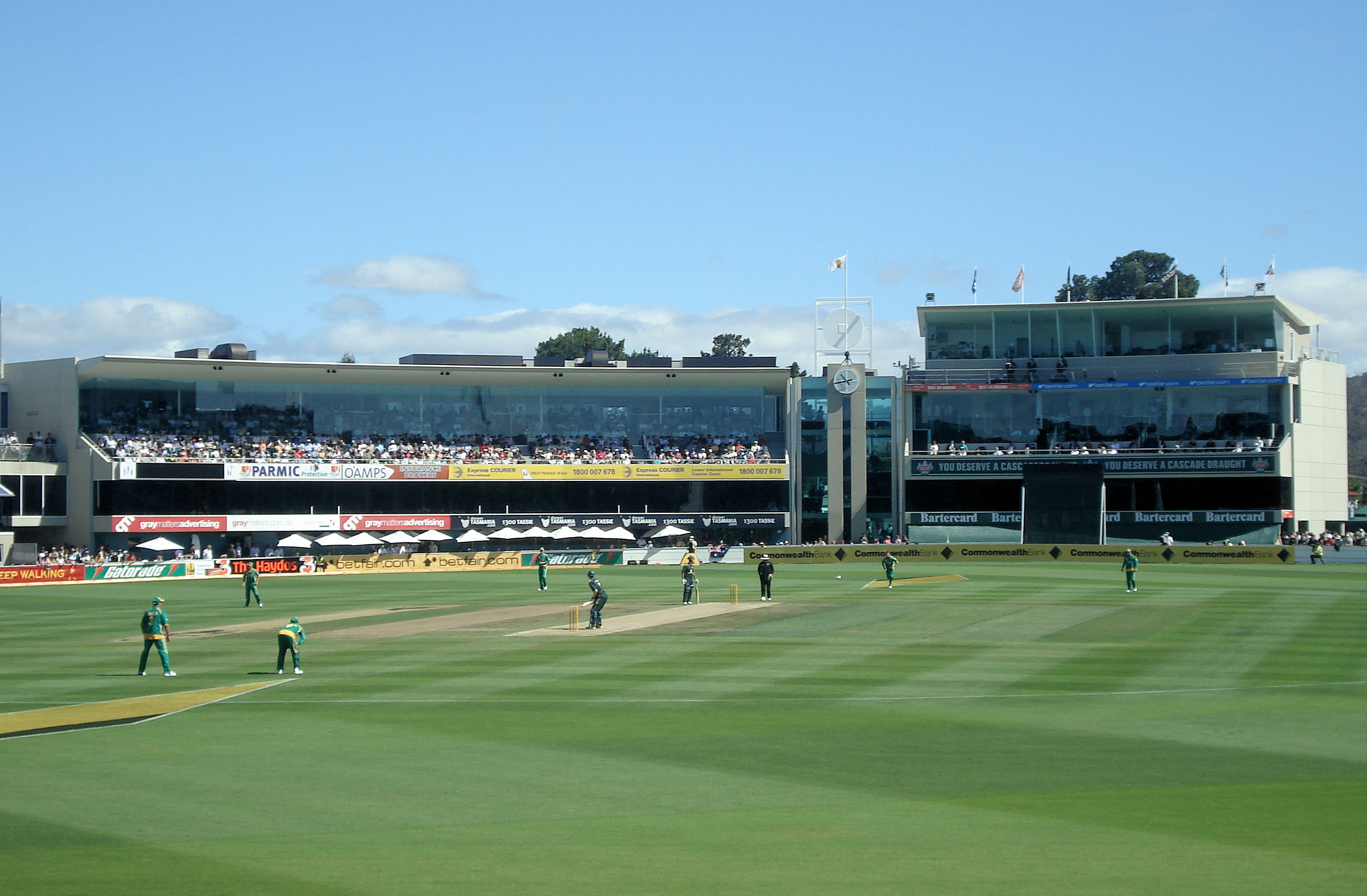
Ponting scored the first ever double-century (209) at his home ground Bellerive Oval (pictured) in the Third Test against Pakistan.

Leading West Indian batsmen Chris Gayle and Shivnarine Chanderpaul returned for the opening Test of the 2009–10 Australian cricket season starting on 26 November in Brisbane, after the industrial dispute was resolved. Ponting scored 55 in an Australian innings victory, before many sections of the media attacked the West Indies lack-lustre performance. Ponting produced scores of 35 and 20 in the following Test in Adelaide, as the touring team responded to their critics by securing a draw. For the first time since 2002, Ponting slid out of the top ten Test batting rankings—dropping to 12th—as Australia faced the prospect of falling to third in the team rankings if they were not able to achieve victory in the final Test of the series. Matters got worse for Ponting, as former Australian fast-bowler Rodney Hogg voiced that he should be sacked as captain and replaced with New South Wales leader Simon Katich. He said the team had become a "boys club" and was not preparing adequately for the future. However, former Australian Test opening batsman Justin Langer labelled Hogg's comments as "rubbish", something that was backed by Katich.

In the first innings of the Third and final Test, Ponting was immediately greeted with short pitched bowling. After mis-timing a pull-shot from Roach on his first ball, Ponting was struck on the elbow in the following delivery. After battling through obvious discomfort, Ponting eventually retired hurt on 23 from 25 balls—the only time he had taken such action in his international career. Nevertheless, he did manage to hit two fours and a six from short deliveries in Roach's 12th over. Michael Clarke replaced Ponting at his number three batting position, as the Australia captain did not want to risk further damage to his elbow tendon injury ahead of the Boxing Day Test against Pakistan in Melbourne. Nevertheless, Australia collapsed and he eventually came to the wicket at number nine, with Australia at 7/125. The West Indian bowlers again bowled short deliverers to Ponting until he turned one such delivery to short-leg and was dismissed for two.

After spending time in a hyperbaric chamber to increase the speed of his recovery from the elbow injury, Ponting recovered sufficiently to play in the Boxing Day Test, the opening match of a three-Test series against Pakistan. Despite still being inconvenienced by the injury, he scored 57 at close to a run-a-ball, before being dismissed by another short pitched delivery for 12 in Australia's second innings. The home team went on to win the match comfortably, and Ponting overtook Shane Warne's record of 91 Test victories and surpassing Steve Waugh as crickets most successful Test captain. Ponting scored 853 runs at 38.77 in 13 Tests in 2009, and scored only one century and seven half-centuries. Nevertheless, his ODI form was more convincing, topping the run-scoring list with MS Dhoni. His 1,198 runs were scored at an average of 42.78, including two centuries and nine half-centuries in 29 matches. Ponting was criticised for choosing to bat on a green pitch for the Second Test. Australia were dismissed for 127, and Ponting was re-dismissed from a short ball, this time for a first-ball duck, and many sections of the media called for him to stop playing the hook and pull shots. He fell for only 11 in the second innings, and when Australia lost their eighth wicket, they were only just over 50 ahead. However, a 123-run ninth-wicket partnership between Michael Hussey and Peter Siddle rescued the home-side, helping them win by 36 runs. After being dropped on zero, Ponting scored his fifth double-century in the Third and final Test in Hobart. His innings helped Australia complete a 3–0 series victory.

In the following five ODIs, Ponting could not continue his Hobart form, scoring 125 runs at 25 in the series, boosted by a half-century in the final match; his performances improved in the five ODIs starting soon after against the West Indies. He was named man-of-the-series thanks to his 295 runs at 73.75, including two-half centuries and his 29th ODI century and first in Brisbane during the fourth match.

=== 2010–11 Ashes defeat ===
Australia entered the 2010–11 Ashes series hoping to regain The Ashes from England on home soil as they had four years previously. The First Test in Brisbane was drawn after both teams posted large batting totals. Ponting was caught behind for 10 in the first innings and 51 not out in the second. A barren run followed in the subsequent three Tests, scoring 52 runs in total as Australia lost the series. Ponting became the first Australian captain to lose an Ashes series in Australia since Allan Border in 1987. During the Fourth Test Ponting was involved in an on-field argument with umpires, and was fined 40% of his match fee, which accounted to around $5,400. Ponting missed the Fifth Test due to a finger injury, and Michael Clarke stood in as Australia's captain. Australia's heavy defeat in the series and Ponting's poor run of form caused his position in the team to be questioned. Former Australian captain Steve Waugh suggested dropping him down the batting order; others, such as former Australian batsman and South African captain Kepler Wessels, called for him to relinquish the captaincy to focus on his batting.

Yet, for his performances in 2010, he was named as captain of the World ODI XI by the ICC.

=== 2011 World Cup and resignation as captain ===
Ponting retained the captaincy of Australia for the 2011 World Cup in India, Sri Lanka and Bangladesh. Australia had won the previous three World Cups and entered the tournament as the world's top-ranked ODI team. Australia qualified for the quarter-finals, although Ponting failed to find form, scoring 102 runs in five innings during the group stage of the tournament. Australia met India in the quarter-finals and were defeated by five wickets. Ponting scored 104, his first century in international cricket in over a year. After being knocked out of the tournament, Ponting resigned his position as captain at both Test and ODI levels, endorsed Michael Clarke as his successor, and indicated his intention to continue playing.

== 2011–2012: Post-captaincy ==
In 2011, Ponting was inducted into Australian Institute of Sport (AIS) 'Best of the Best'. He was selected in Michael Clarke's teams for the tours of Sri Lanka and South Africa in 2011, scoring an important half-century (62) in the fourth innings of the second Test against South Africa in Johannesburg, helping Australia chase down a target of 310 to draw the series 1–1.

In the 2011–12 Australian summer, a disappointing series draw with New Zealand gave rise to calls for Ponting to be removed from the team following perceived underperformances. The selectors resisted the calls, selecting Ponting for the Boxing Day Test—the first of a four-Test series against India. Ponting scored two half-centuries in Australia's first Test win, followed by a century (134) in Australia's first innings of the second Test in Sydney. The century was his first in Test cricket in almost two years. His fourth-wicket partnership of 288 runs with Clarke, who went on to make 329 not out, set a new record for the biggest partnership by an Australian pair of batsmen against India. Australia sealed the series win by defeating India in Perth, and in the fourth Test in Adelaide, Ponting and Clarke beat their own record, putting on 386 runs. The partnership was the fourth highest to that point in Australian Test cricket. Ponting's own score was 221. During the innings, he became only the third player and the first Australian (after Sachin Tendulkar and Rahul Dravid, who were playing in the same match) to pass 13,000 career Test runs.

== 2012: Test retirement ==
On Australia Day 2012 he was appointed as an Officer of the Order of Australia for services to cricket and, through the Ponting Foundation, the community. Ponting was promoted to captain in the 2011–12 Commonwealth Bank Series in Australia in Michael Clarke's absence due to injury. However, after only two games as captain he was dropped, having scored only 18 runs in 5 games of the 2011–12 Commonwealth Bank Series. At a press conference thereafter, Ponting conceded, "I don't expect to play one-day international cricket for Australia any more and I'm pretty sure the selectors don't expect to pick me either ... I will continue playing Test cricket and I'll continue playing for Tasmania as well".

On 29 November 2012 Ponting announced that he would retire from Test cricket after the WACA test against South Africa.

== 2013: Tasmania and Surrey ==
After retiring from test cricket, Ponting played out the Sheffield Shield season with eventual champions Tasmania. He was the competition's leading run scorer with 911 runs at an average of 75.91. As a result of his prolific form with the bat, he was named the Sheffield Shield player of the year.

He signed on to play for Surrey during June–July 2013. His score of 192 on debut against Derbyshire was the highest score by a Surrey batsman on their first class debut for the county. Ponting scored a defiant 169 not out in failing light against Nottinghamshire in his final first class innings, ensuring Surrey held on for a draw.

During the Ashes 2013, Ponting wrote a regular column for the Daily Mail.

At the formal opening of the Bellerive Oval redevelopment in January 2015, it was announced that the new Western Stand would be named the Ricky Ponting Stand in his honour. On 9 December 2015 Ponting also unveiled a bronze statue placed at the ground in his honour.

== Playing style ==
=== Approach to cricket ===
Ponting was known as an aggressive competitor, as manifested in his on-field conduct. According to former Australian captain Allan Border, what you see with Ponting is what you get, and "he wears his heart on his sleeve". Border also noted that Ponting has an abundance of determination, courage and skill.

His competitive attitudes could be overly aggressive, pushing the boundaries of cricket etiquette. In early 2006, in the Chappell–Hadlee Trophy, Ponting had an on-field argument with umpire Billy Bowden over signalling a no-ball because not enough players were within the inner circle. In mid-2006, during a tour of Bangladesh, Ponting was accused of "badgering the umpires until he got what he wanted".

The South African captain, Graeme Smith, described Ponting as the toughest competitor he had ever played against.

=== Batting ===
Ponting's results in international matches
| | Matches | Won | Lost | Drawn | Tied | No result |
| Test | 168 | 108 | 31 | 29 | 0 | – |
| ODI | 375 | 262 | 96 | - | 5 | 12 |
| T20I | 17 | 7 | 10 | – | - | - |

Ponting was known as an aggressive right-handed batsman who played a wide repertoire of shots with confidence, most notably the pull and hook. However, he had some technical weaknesses, such as shuffling across his stumps and being trapped leg before wicket, and thrusting his bat away from his body—especially early in his innings, because he wanted to move forward and across to drive, rather than backwards and across to cut the ball. Despite being widely renowned as the best player of the hook and pull shots in the world, Ponting was equally adept on both the front and back foot. However, during the latter stages of his career, the hook and pull shots were often the cause of his dismissal. He adopted a more traditional V-grip lower down the handle as he was a short batsman who doesn't have natural power on the shot.

He was considered by some observers to have trouble against quality spin, especially against Indian off spinner Harbhajan Singh, who dismissed Ponting on 13 occasions in international cricket. Ponting had a tendency to rock onto the front foot and thrust his wrists at spinning deliveries, resulting in many catches close to the wicket. Ponting rarely employed the sweep shot against spin, something considered unusual for a top-order batsman. Instead, he looked to use his feet to come down the wicket to spinners, or play off the back foot through the off-side. Former West Indian captain, Viv Richards, who was rated as the third best Test cricketer in a 2002 poll by Wisden, said Ponting was his favourite current-day player to watch, slightly ahead of Sachin Tendulkar.

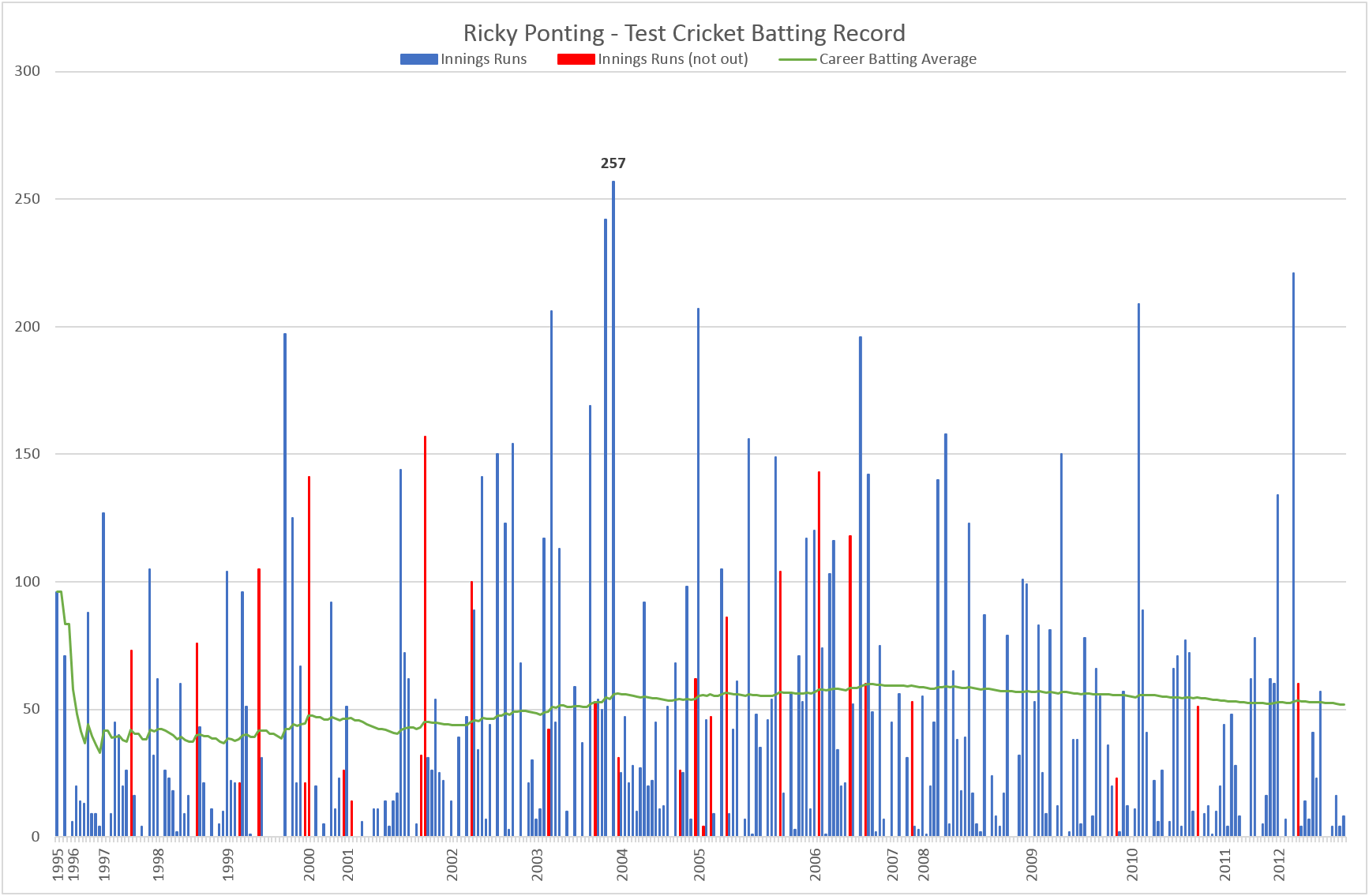
This is the complete graphical representation of the test cricket record of Ricky Ponting. Individual innings are represented by the blue and red (not out) bars; the green line is his career batting average. Current as of 8 January 2019.

=== Bowling and fielding ===
A right-arm medium bowler who tended to bowl off cutters or faster offspin, Ponting rarely bowled, although he notably dismissed West Indian batsman Brian Lara in an ODI match and former England captain Michael Vaughan in an Ashes Test in 2005. He was also ceremonially asked to bowl in his final test match against South Africa in 2012. He was, however, rated one of the best fielders in the world. He usually fielded in the slips, cover and silly point. His good eye and accurate throws often saw him run batsmen out with direct hits.

=== Captaincy ===
Record as captain
| | Matches | Won | Lost | Drawn | Tied | No result | Win % |
| Test | 77 | 48 | 16 | 7 | 0 | – | 62.34% |
| ODI | 229 | 164 | 51 | 0 | 2 | 12 | 71.62% |
| Twenty20 | 17 | 7 | 10 | 0 | 0 | – | 41.18% |
| Date last Updated: | | 2 September 2015 | | | | | |

Ponting has often been criticised for his lack of imagination in his captaincy, though many players who played under him say he is a good leader. According to former Australian opening batsman Justin Langer, "He is quite inspirational as a leader and I just never get all the detractors he has. Whether it's in the fielding practice, the nets, the way he holds himself off the field—every time he speaks, these young guys just listen, they hang on every word he says."

"Ponting captained 2 consecutive World Cup victories in 2003 and 2007 (out of Australia's hat-trick of World Cups – 1999, 2003, 2007)"

== Career best performances ==
| | Batting | | | |
| | Score | Fixture | Venue | Season |
|---|---|---|---|---|
| Test | 257 | Australia v India | MCG, Melbourne | 2003 |
| ODI | 164 | South Africa v Australia | Wanderers Stadium, Johannesburg | 2006 |
| T20I | 98* | New Zealand v Australia | Eden Park, Auckland | 2005 |
| FC | 257 | Australia v India | MCG, Melbourne | 2003 |
| LA | 164 | South Africa v Australia | Wanderers Stadium, Johannesburg | 2006 |
| T20 | 98* | New Zealand v Australia | Eden Park, Auckland | 2005 |

== Records and achievements ==
Ponting was the Wisden Leading Cricketer in the World in 2003 and one of the five Wisden Cricketers of the Year for 2006. He has been the Allan Border Medalist a record four times in 2004, 2006, 2007 and 2009 (with Michael Clarke). Ponting has won the award of Australia's best Test player in 2003, 2004 and 2007 and Australia's best One Day International player in 2002 and 2007.

- First batsman to score centuries in ODI cricket against all Test playing nations (Afghanistan and Ireland were not awarded Test status in Ponting's playing period).
- Ponting, along with Shane Watson, holds the record for the highest partnership for any wicket in the ICC Champions Trophy (252 not out for the second wicket).
- Ponting's score of 242 against India is the highest individual Test innings in a losing cause.
- He was awarded the Allan Border Medal by the CA in 2004, 2006, 2007 and 2009.
- ICC Men’s Test Cricketer of the Year: 2006
- ICC Men’s Cricketer of the Year: 2006, 2007
- ICC Men’s Test Team of the Year: 2004 (c), 2005 (c), 2006, 2007 (c)
- ICC Men’s ODI Team of the Year: 2004(c), 2006, 2007(c), 2008 (c), 2010(c)
- Sheffield Shield Player of the Year: 2012–13

He was named an Australia Post Legend of Cricket in 2021.

== Coaching ==
=== 2014–2017 Various Coaching Roles ===
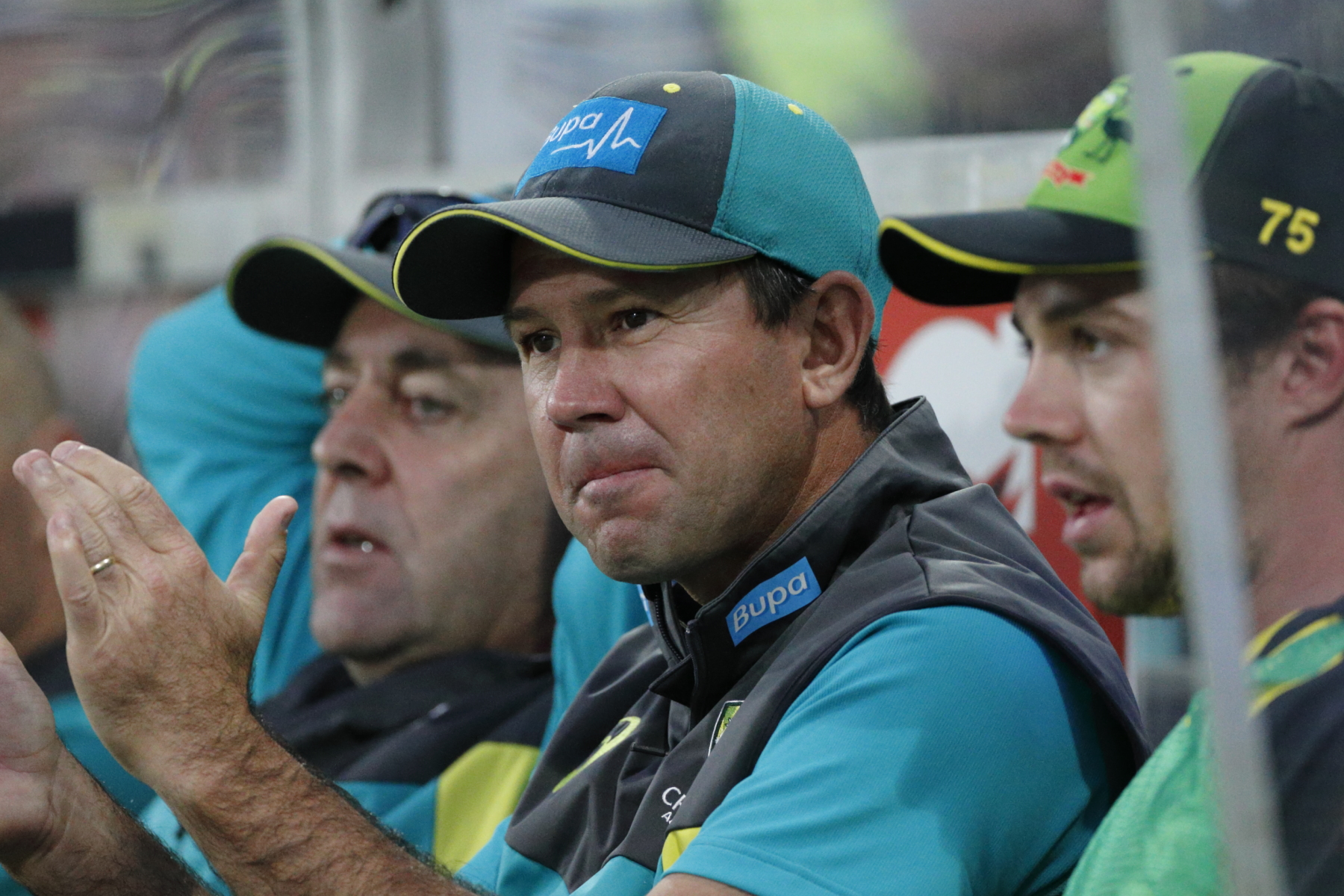
Ponting during the 2017–18 Tri-Series

Ponting coached the Mumbai Indians of the Indian Premier League from 2014 to 2016, helping them win a championship in the 2015 edition of the IPL. On 1 January 2017, Ponting was named an interim coach for Australia's T20I series against Sri Lanka. Ponting joined the Australian cricket coaching team as an assistant for the 2017–18 Trans-Tasman Tri-Series.

=== 2018–2024 Delhi Daredevils/Capitals Head Coach ===
Ponting was appointed as the new coach of Delhi Daredevils of the Indian Premier League on 3 January 2018. In the 2018 edition of the IPL, Delhi Daredevils finished last place. Ponting helped foster a new team environment, helping young talents such as Shreyas Iyer and Rishabh Pant grow. In 2019, Delhi (now Delhi Capitals), finished in 3rd place, a large improvement from their previous season. In 2020, Delhi would finish second, and in 2021 Delhi would finish in third place being the only team to qualify for the playoffs in 2019, 2020 and 2021, subsequently. In 2024, Ponting was sacked as the coach of Delhi Capitals in favour of Former Indian Captain Sourav Ganguly.

=== 2024–present Punjab Kings Head Coach ===
Ricky Ponting has been appointed head coach of Punjab Kings (PBKS) from IPL 2025, a little over two months after he and Delhi Capitals parted ways ending his seven-year tenure at the franchise.Ponting will be the sixth head coach in seven seasons at Punjab, who finished ninth in the 2024 season

=== 2024–present Washington Freedom Head Coach ===
Ponting was appointed as the new head coach of Washington Freedom ahead of the second season of Major League Cricket on 6 February 2024. The two-year signing was confirmed by the team on social media. The team won the tournament under his coaching and captain Steve Smith.

== Books ==
Throughout his career in international cricket, Ponting has been involved in the writing of a number of diaries on Australian cricket, which depict his experiences during the cricketing year. The books are produced with the help of a ghostwriter. His autobiography, Ponting: At the Close of Play, was published and released in November 2013.

- Ricky Ponting; Peter Staples (1998). Ricky Ponting. Ironbark Press. ISBN 978-0-330-36117-0.
- Ricky Ponting; Brian Murgatroyd (2003). Ricky Ponting's World Cup Diary. HarperCollins Publishers Australia. ISBN 978-0-7322-7847-2.
- Ricky Ponting; Brian Murgatroyd (2004). My First Year. HarperCollins Publishers Australia. ISBN 978-0-7322-7848-9.
- Ricky Ponting; Brian Murgatroyd (2005). Ashes Diary. HarperCollins Publishers Australia. ISBN 978-0-7322-8152-6.
- Ricky Ponting; Geoff Armstrong (2006). Captain's Diary 2006. HarperCollins Publishers Australia. ISBN 978-0-7322-8153-3.
- Ricky Ponting; Geoff Armstrong (2007). Captain's Diary 2007. HarperCollins Publishers Australia. ISBN 978-0-7322-8153-3.
- Ricky Ponting; Geoff Armstrong (2008). Captain's Diary 2008. HarperCollins Publishers Australia. ISBN 978-0-7322-8491-6.
- Ricky Ponting; Geoff Armstrong (2009). Captain's Diary 2009. HarperCollins Publishers Australia. ISBN 978-0-7322-8957-7.
- Ricky Ponting (2013). Ponting: At the Close of Play. HarperSport. ISBN 9780732291822.

== Personal life ==
Ponting is a passionate supporter of the North Melbourne Football Club. When touring with the Australian cricket team, Ponting would call friends at home to listen to the Kangaroos play. He helped raise more than $300,000 for childhood cancer support through a cricket game organised between North and Hawthorn, and in 2024, Ponting Wines became the official wine partner of the club.

Ponting married his long-time girlfriend, law student Rianna Cantor, in June 2002. After their marriage, Ponting credited Rianna as the reason for his increased maturity. The couple have three children.

== Sources ==
- Nick Richardson (2002). Ricky Ponting. Legend Books. ISBN 978-1-877096-13-6.
- Ricky Ponting; Peter Staples (1998). Ricky Ponting. Ironbark Press. ISBN 978-0-330-36117-0.
- Piesse, Ken (1999). The Taylor Years: Australian cricket 1994–99. Penguin Books Australia. ISBN 978-0-670-88829-0.
- Knight, James (2003). Mark Waugh: The biography. Harper Collins. ISBN 978-0-00-715454-8.
- Ricky Ponting; Brian Murgatroyd (2003). World Cup Diary. HarperCollins Publishers Australia. ISBN 978-0-7322-7847-2.
- Ricky Ponting; Brian Murgatroyd (2004). My First Year. HarperCollins Publishers Australia. ISBN 978-0-7322-7848-9.
- Armstrong, Geoff (2006). The 100 Greatest Cricketers. New Holland Publishers. ISBN 978-1-74110-439-4.
- Ricky Ponting; Brian Murgatroyd (2005). Ashes Diary. HarperCollins Publishers Australia. ISBN 978-0-7322-8152-6.
- Ricky Ponting; Geoff Armstrong (2006). Captain's Diary 2006. HarperCollins Publishers Australia. ISBN 978-0-7322-8153-3.
- Ricky Ponting; Geoff Armstrong (2007). Captain's Diary 2007. HarperCollins Publishers Australia. ISBN 978-0-7322-8153-3.
- Ricky Ponting; Geoff Armstrong (2008). Captain's Diary 2008. HarperCollins Publishers Australia. ISBN 978-0-7322-8491-6.
- Ricky Ponting; Geoff Armstrong (2009). Captain's Diary 2009. HarperCollins Publishers Australia. ISBN 978-0-7322-8957-7.

Sporting positions
| Preceded by Jamie Cox | Tasmanian First-class cricket captain 2001–02 – 2007–08 | Succeeded by Daniel Marsh |
| Preceded by Jamie Cox | Tasmanian List A cricket captain 2001–02 – 2007–08 | Succeeded by Daniel Marsh |
Awards
| Preceded by Matthew Hayden | Wisden Leading Cricketer in the World; 2004 | Succeeded by Shane Warne |
| Preceded by Andrew Flintoff joint with Jacques Kallis | Sir Garfield Sobers Trophy; 2006–2007 | Succeeded by Shivnarine Chanderpaul |
