= Ponting: At the Close of Play =

Book by Ricky Ponting

- First edition
- Author: Ricky Ponting
- Language: English
- Subject: Autobiography
- Genre: Autobiography
- Publisher: HarperSport
- Publication date: 21 October 2013
- Publication place: Australia
- Media type: Print (Hardcover & Paperback), E-book
- Pages: 721

Ponting: At the Close of Play is the autobiography of the former Australian cricketer Ricky Ponting. It was published on 21 October 2013 by HarperSport.
