= Wasim Khan =

English cricketer (born 1971)

Wasim Khan MBE
Personal information
- Full name: Wasim Gulzar Khan
- Born: 26 February 1971 (age 55); Birmingham, Warwickshire, England
- Batting: Left-handed
- Bowling: Right-arm leg spin

Domestic team information
- Years: Team
- 1992–1997: Warwickshire
- 1998–2000: Sussex
- 2001: Derbyshire
- 2002: Warwickshire

Career statistics
Competition	First-class	List A
Matches	58	30
Runs scored	2,835	303
Batting average	30.15	12.12
100s/50s	5/17	0/0
Top score	181	33
Balls bowled	132	114
Wickets	0	2
Bowling average	–	50.00
5 wickets in innings	–	0
10 wickets in match	–	0
Best bowling	–	1/7
Catches/stumpings	36/–	8/–
- Source: Cricinfo, 10 October 2011

Wasim Gulzar Khan MBE (born 26 February 1971) is a former English cricketer who was the first English player with Pakistani origin to play professional cricket in England. He was a left-handed batsman who also bowled right arm medium pace.

== Early life and career ==
Khan's family, originally from the Kashmir region, relocated to England in the early 1950s. Khan was born in Birmingham and attended Somerville Primary School before continuing on to Oldknow Secondary School. At the age of 12, he began to display a talent for cricket, and was encouraged to play by a teacher. Later that year in 1983, he was selected for the Warwickshire Under 13s team. Khan was the only state school boy in that team.

== Domestic career ==
He played first-class cricket for the record-breaking double-winning Warwickshire team in 1995, averaging 49 in the championship winning team. He also gained a NatWest winners medal. He represented England in the Under 19s.

== Cricket administration ==
=== England ===
Khan was seen as one of the most important men in English cricket, leading the Cricket Foundation's £50 million Chance to Shine campaign as the CEO. The campaign aimed to regenerate competitive cricket in state schools. Prior to this, he was Operations Director for the Cricket Foundation's campaign – Chance to Shine. Since launching in 2005, Chance to Shine has reached over 1.8 million children across 6,500 schools and has raised close to £40 million. He also sits on the Equality and Human Rights Commission Sports Group, The Prince's Trust Cricket Group, and has the Anti-Corruption and Security Unit of the England and Wales Cricket Board. In January 2015, he earned a Master of Business Administration from the Warwick Business School.

He was made a Member of the Order of the British Empire (MBE) in the 2013 Birthday Honours for services to cricket and the community.

In October 2014, he was made Chief Executive of the Leicestershire County Cricket Club.

=== Pakistan ===
In December 2018, he was appointed as the managing director of the Pakistan Cricket Board (PCB) and moved to Pakistan to take his office in February 2019. In September 2021, he resigned as PCB chief executive four months before the end of his contract.

=== International ===
In April 2022, Khan was appointed International Cricket Council's General Manager of cricket.

== Book ==
His autobiography Brim Full of Passion was voted Wisden Book of the Year in 2007.
