= Australian cricket team in Ceylon and India in 1935–36 =

International cricket tour

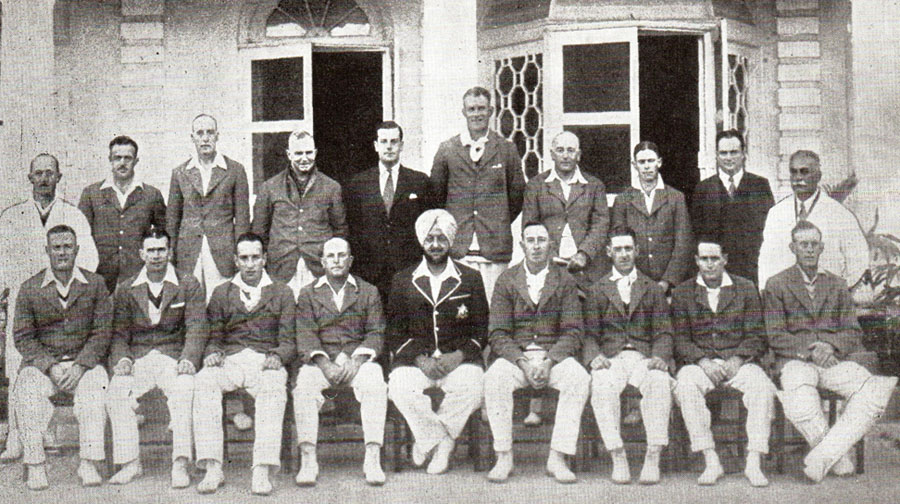
The Australian team. Standing, left to right: umpire, Harry Alexander, Hunter Hendry, Jack Ellis, Louis Tarrant, Lisle Nagel, Frank Tarrant, Ron Morrisby, Frank Warne, umpire. Seated: Frank Bryant, Ron Oxenham, Tom Leather, Charlie McCartney, Maharajah of Patiala, Jack Ryder, Hammy Love, Fred Mair, Wendell Bill. Absent: Bert Ironmonger, Arthur Allsopp.

An Australian cricket team toured Ceylon and India in 1935–36, playing 17 first-class matches between October 1935 and February 1936, including four unofficial Tests.

== Background ==
This tour was privately organized, and was not endorsed by the Australian Board of Control. Australia's Test team were touring South Africa, and the Board, determined that the Sheffield Shield season should not be further affected by the absence of leading players, stipulated that no current Sheffield Shield players would be allowed to tour India.

The finance for the tour was provided by The Maharaja of Patiala, and the team was selected and organized by the Australian cricketer Frank Tarrant, who had long playing experience in Australia, England and India. The team's official title was "His Highness the Maharaja of Patiala's Team of Australian Cricketers".

== The Australian team ==
The team chosen consisted largely of former Test players and fringe Sheffield Shield players. The players, with their ages at the start of the tour in late October 1935, were:

- Jack Ryder (captain; 46)
- Harry Alexander (30)
- Arthur Allsopp (27)
- Wendell Bill (25)
- Frank Bryant (25)
- John Ellis (45)
- Hunter Hendry (40)
- Bert Ironmonger (53)
- Tom Leather (25)
- Hammy Love (40)
- Charlie Macartney (49)
- Frederick Mair (34)
- Ronald Morrisby (20)
- Lisle Nagel (30)
- Ron Oxenham (44)

As well, Frank Warne (29) played in three of the first-class matches, Frank Tarrant (54) and Joseph Davis (age unknown) each played in two, and Tarrant's son Louis (31) played in one. The Maharaja of Patiala also played in one match for the Australians, as guest captain against Patiala, who were captained by his son, the Yuvraj of Patiala.

== The tour ==
The tour began in October 1935 in Colombo with one first-class match against Ceylon which the Australians won by an innings and 127 runs.

From November 1935 to February 1936, the team played 16 first-class matches in India, including four matches against an All-India XI:

- 1st international at Bombay Gymkhana – Australia won by 9 wickets
- 2nd international at Eden Gardens, Calcutta – Australia won by 8 wickets
- 3rd international at Bagh-e-Jinnah, Lahore – India won by 68 runs
- 4th international at M. A. Chidambaram Stadium, Madras – India won by 33 runs
