= Wazir =

Wazir often refers to:

- Vizier or wazir or wazier, a high-ranking political advisor or minister

Wazir may also refer to:

== Places ==
- Wazirabad, a City in Punjab, Pakistan
- Waziristan, a region in tribal belt of Khyber Pakhtunkhwa, Pakistan
- Wazir Akbar Khan (Kabul), a neighborhood in Kabul, Afghanistan
- Wazir, Nangarhar, a village in Khogyani District, Afghanistan

== Other uses ==
- Wazir (chess), a fairy chess piece that moves one space in an orthogonal direction
- Wazir (film), a 2016 Bollywood film starring Amitabh Bachchan and Farhan Akhtar
- Wazir (Pashtun tribe), a tribe in Waziristan, Pakistan
- Wazir (Khogyani clan), a tribe in Nangarhar Province, Afghanistan
- Waziri language, a Pashto dialects spoken in the Waziristan region of Pakistan
- Vizier (Brunei), or Wazir, a class of royal dignitaries in Brunei

== People with the name ==
- Wazir Khan (Lahore) (1560–1641), 17th-century court physician to Shah Jahan
- Wazir Khan (Sirhind) (1635–1710), governor of Sirhind in the Mughal Empire
- Wazir Ali Khan (1780–1817), fourth nawab of Awadh, India
- Wazir Akbar Khan (1816–1845), an Afghan prince, general, and emir
- Wazir Arsala Khan, Foreign Minister of Afghanistan in 1869
- Wazir Ali (1903–1950), India Test cricketer
- Wazir Mohammad (1929–2025), Pakistani cricketer and banker
- Haji Wazir (Bagram detainee), a detainee at Bagram who had a writ of habeas corpus filed on his behalf
- Ali Wazir (born 1976), Pakistani politician and leader of the Pashtun Tahafuz Movement
- Arif Wazir (1982–2020), Pakistani politician and leader of the Pashtun Tahafuz Movement
- Mir Kalam (Mir Kalam Khan Wazir) (born 1990), Pakistani politician and leader of the Pashtun Tahafuz Movement
- Khalil al-Wazir (1935–1988), Palestinian military leader and senior aide of Yasser Arafat
- Khalid Wazir (1936–2020), former Pakistani cricketer
- Safiya Wazir (born 1991), American politician
- Usman Wazeer (born 2000), Pakistani boxer
- Wazir Baig (born 1942), Pakistani politician and former speaker of Gilgit Baltistan Assembly
- Gilaman Wazir (1992–2024), Afghan Pashto poet and political activist

== See also ==
- Waziri (disambiguation)
- Vazir (disambiguation)
