= Walter Bradshaw =

Australian-born English cricketer

Personal information
- Full name: Walter Hulatt Bradshaw
- Born: 22 January 1909; Adelaide, South Australia, Australia
- Died: 13 July 1986 (aged 77); Adderbury, Oxfordshire, England
- Batting: Right-handed
- Bowling: Right-arm fast-medium

Domestic team information
- Years: Team
- 1948: Buckinghamshire
- 1936/37–1937/38: Europeans (India)
- 1935/36–1939/40: Rajputana
- 1929–1931: Oxford University

Career statistics
Competition	First-class
Matches	25
Runs scored	330
Batting average	11.00
100s/50s	–/1
Top score	81
Balls bowled	4,460
Wickets	76
Bowling average	26.32
5 wickets in innings	3
10 wickets in match	1
Best bowling	8/68
Catches/stumpings	12/–
- Source: Cricinfo, 22 July 2011

Walter Hulatt Bradshaw (22 January 1909 – 13 July 1986) was an Australian born English cricketer. Bradshaw was a right-handed batsman who bowled right-arm fast-medium. He was born in Adelaide, South Australia.

He was educated at Malvern College, where he played for the college cricket team. Bradshaw later undertook studies at Oxford University,. He made his first-class debut for Oxford University Cricket Club against the Free Foresters. He played twelve further first-class matches for the university, the last of which came against Cambridge University in 1931. With the bat, he scored 178 runs at an average of 14.83, with his only innings of note, a score of 81, coming against Gloucestershire in 1930. He was an average bowler when he played for Oxford University, taking 25 wickets at a bowling average of 39.28, with best figures of 4/15. While at Oxford, he also achieved an Oxford Blue in football.

After his studies at Oxford, Bradshaw became an educator and embarked on a teaching assignment in the British Raj. While there, he played in the Ranji Trophy for Rajputana and was the team's first Ranji Trophy captain. It was though for a combined Rajputana and Central India that he played his first first-class match in India against the touring Australian team in 1935. The match was not a successful one for him with the bat, with Bradshaw making scores of 2 and 0. With the ball, he took the wicket of Frank Bryant in the Australians first-innings for the cost of 56 runs from 17 overs. In their second innings, he took the wickets of Wendell Bill and Arthur Allsopp for the cost of 42 runs from 14 overs. His debut for Rajputana came in the same season against Central India. He made six further first-class appearances for the team, the last of which came against Southern Punjab. While in India, he also played two matches for the Europeans in 1938. His appearances in India benefited his bowling. A tall man, he had increased his strength, running in from a short run up and with the ability to lift the ball sharply and move the ball in from off. For Rajputana he took 31 wickets at an average of 20.09, with best figures of 7/52. These figures, his best in first-class cricket, came against Southern Punjab in 1938, a match in which he also took 5/69 to give him his only ten wicket haul in a match.

Following World War II, Bradshaw played Minor Counties Championship cricket for Buckinghamshire in 1948, making four appearances. For many years he worked as a master at Stowe School, where he coached the school cricket team. He died in Adderbury, Oxfordshire on 13 July 1986.
