= Louis Tarrant =

Australian cricketer and umpire (1903–1943)

Loris Tarrant
Personal information
- Full name: Loris Bernard Napoleon Tarrant
- Born: 29 December 1903; Clifton Hill, Victoria, Australia
- Died: 23 August 1943 (aged 39); Western Australia
- Role: Batsman, occasional wicket-keeper
- Relatives: Frank Tarrant (father); Ambrose Tarrant (grand-uncle)

Umpiring information
- FC umpired: 2 (1933)

Career statistics
Competition	First-class
Matches	1
Runs scored	16
Batting average	–
100s/50s	0/0
Top score	16*
Catches/stumpings	2/–
- Source: ESPNCricinfo, 11 January 2015

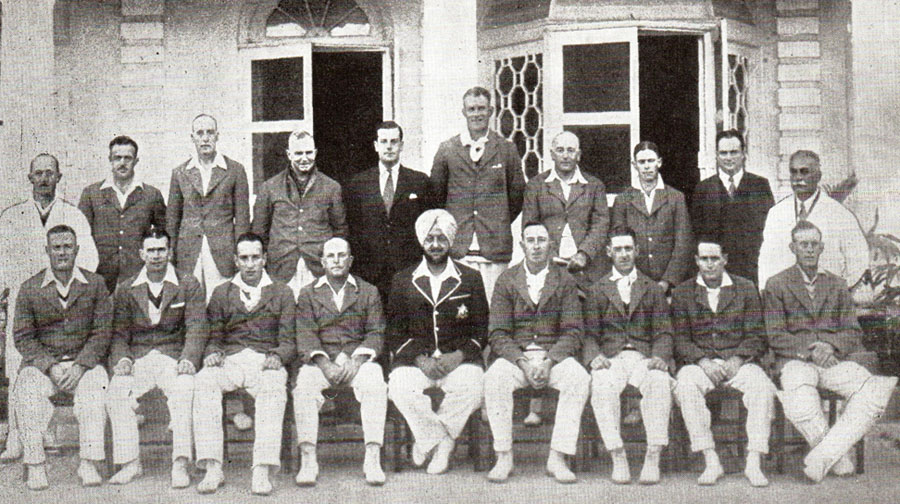
The 1935–36 Australian team on its tour of India. Loris (left) and Frank (right) Tarrant are either side of the 6 feet 6 inches (1.98 m) fast bowler Lisle Nagel in the back row.

Loris Bernard Napoleon Tarrant (29 December 1903 – 23 August 1943) was an Australian cricketer who both played and umpired first-class matches in India during the 1930s. Unusually, he made his debut as a first-class umpire before making his debut as a first-class player.

== Personal life ==
Born in Clifton Hill, Victoria, Tarrant was the son of Frank Tarrant, who played 329 first-class matches in Australia (for Victoria), England (for Middlesex), and India (for the Europeans and Patiala). Frank Tarrant's uncle, Ambrose Tarrant, also played at first-class level for Victoria.

Tarrant moved to England at the age of six months, returning to Australia as a young man. He later accompanied his father to India and became guardian and tutor to Yadavindra Singh, the Yuvraj (Crown Prince) of Patiala. He coached the prince in cricket, swimming, soccer and boxing. Yadavindra succeeded his father as Maharaja of Patiala in 1938 and the following year Tarrant was appointed as his aide-de-camp with the rank of captain, the only non-Sikh ADC.

Tarrant was interred at Karrakatta Cemetery in Perth, Western Australia, following his death in August 1943, aged 39.

== Umpiring career ==
While resident in India during the early 1930s, Tarrant, aged 29, umpired two first-class matches during an MCC team's 1933–34 tour of Ceylon and India. In the first, beginning on 9 November 1933, Southern Punjab, captained by the Maharaja of Patiala, hosted the Englishmen at Amritsar's Alexandra Ground. Tarrant umpired alongside his father, Frank, who was standing in a first-class match for only the second time (although he went to umpire two of the England–India Test matches played on the tour). Other father-and-son pairs known to have umpired in the same first-class match include M. G. Vijayasarathi and his son M. V. Nagendra, who umpired a match between Mysore and Andhra during the 1960–61 season, and Tom Sewell senior and junior, who umpired an 1863 Gentlemen v Players fixture.

The second match Tarrant umpired began the day after the conclusion of the first, with a Patiala team hosting the MCC at Patiala's Baradari Ground. Frank Tarrant played for Patiala rather than umpire, with his son's umpiring companion being (The Rt. Rev.) George Barne, an ex-Somerset player who was at the time Bishop of Lahore.

== Playing career ==
In December 1934, Tarrant made up the numbers as wicket-keeper for Patiala in a non-first-class match against a Bombay XI, led by J. D. Antia. His teammates in that game included his father, Indian Test players Lala Amarnath, Nazir Ali, and Wazir Ali, and Prince Peter of Greece, a cousin of three Kings of Greece and Prince Philip, Duke of Edinburgh, the future consort of Elizabeth II of the United Kingdom. When an Australian team toured during the 1935–36 season, Tarrant was called on to make up the team's numbers in two matches, firstly in a minor match against the Maharaja of Cooch Behar's team in Calcutta, and then in a match against Patiala, which was accorded first-class status.

In his only first-class innings, Tarrant, aged 32, scored 16 not out batting ninth in the Australians' total of 484 all out. Owing to injury and illness, the team was so depleted that Frank Tarrant, aged 55, and the Maharajah of Patiala, aged 44, were both called upon to play, with the Maharajah given the honour of captaining the Australian team. Patiala's captain was the Maharajah's son and heir, the Yuvraj of Patiala, who later succeeded him on the gadi (throne). The Patialas and the Tarrants consequently each became one of the few father–son pairings to play in the same first-class match, with the Maharajah and the Yuvraj the only combination known to have captained opposing sides.
