= Ronald Morrisby =

Personal information
- Full name: Ronald Orlando George Morrisby
- Born: 12 January 1915; Hobart, Tasmania
- Died: 10 June 1995 (aged 80); Hobart, Tasmania
- Batting: Right-handed
- Role: Batsman

Domestic team information
- Years: Team
- 1931/32–1951/52: Tasmania

Career statistics
Competition	FC
Matches	52
Runs scored	2,596
Batting average	32.45
100s/50s	3/14
Top score	145
Catches/stumpings	16/–
- Source: Cricinfo, 25 September 2009

Ronald Orlando George Morrisby (12 January 1915 – 10 June 1995), was an Australian cricketer who played first-class cricket for Tasmania from 1931 until 1952. He can be considered one of the most outstanding Tasmanian batsman of his era, and was unlucky never to be selected to play test cricket for Australia, despite having toured India with an Australian side. Morrisby was the 29th player to captain the Tasmanian first-class team, but was never able to lead them to victory. An exciting batsman with a preference for playing off the back foot, he played for South Hobart Cricket Club in the Tasmanian Grade Cricket competition, and still holds many records in that competition, including being the all-time leading run scorer.

== Club career ==
Ronald Morrisby still holds the record for the most runs in a single season in the Tasmanian Grade Cricket competition, having score 1099 runs in the 1950–51 season. His highest season average of 77.71 is also still the highest ever. Morrisby is also the all-time leading run-scorer in that competition, with his career total for South Hobart Cricket Club, a staggering 16,000 runs exactly. His highest score of 197 against Sandy Bay Cricket Club (his own team South Hobart, and Sandy Bay were later to merge) is the second highest score ever made in the Tasmanian grade competition. He also scored 180*, and passed 150 on six occasions, but never managed a double century in his entire career. Morrisby also holds the record for the highest ever first wicket partnership, when he and Jim Atkinson put on an unbeaten stand of 286 against New Town Cricket Club in the 1931–32 season. He was the highest season aggregate run-scorer in an incredible 13 separate seasons. Morrisby helped South Hobart to five premierships during his career, before finally retired from club cricket in 1960 at the age of 45.

== First-class career ==
Morrisby made his first-class debut against Victoria at the Melbourne Cricket Ground, unusually on Christmas Day, 25 December 1931. It was eighteen days before his seventeenth birthday. He was disappointingly bowled for 3 by Arthur Liddicut in his first innings, but a fine 67 in the second showed that he was of first-class cricket material. Morrisby took over the Tasmanian captaincy from Sydney Putman during the 1937–38 season, and held on to the post until his retirement in 1952. Putman was in fact the fourth non-permanent holder of the post during the 1930s, and so Morrisby can be considered the first permanent captain of Tasmania since Jim Atkinson stood down in 1934.

The Tasmanian team that played the Indians at Hobart in January 1948. Ron Morrisby, the captain, is seated third from the left.

Off the back of an excellent season in 1934–35 in the Tasmanian competition, Morrisby was somewhat surprisingly called up for the Australian team's tour on India in 1935–36, led by Frank Tarrant. He had an excellent tour, scoring 2 centuries, and 3 half-centuries, and played in all four unofficial Test matches (only first-class status) against India. His highest ever first-class score of 145 came against Patiala in Punjab. Having been set a competitive 352 to chase, Morrisby top-scored, including sharing a second-wicket partnership of 274 with New South Welshman, Wendell Bill. Including his matches for Tasmania in that year, Morrisby had the best first-class season of his career in 1935–36, scoring 811 runs at 40.55, with 2 centuries and 5 half-centuries.

As with most cricketers of his era, Morrisby's first-class career was interrupted by the outbreak of World War II. He only ever managed to score one additional century after the 1935-36 tour of India, which had proved to be the highlight of his first-class career, and that came in a match against the touring Indians in the 1947–48 season. They stopped in Tasmania to play two tour matches, and in the second at the NTCA Ground on 16 January 1948, Morrisby made 130 in a remarkable Tasmanian total of 458 all out, chasing the Indians first innings score of 7 for 457 declared. The match was rain-affected, and ended in a draw, but is notable in that it was the first-class debut of Emerson Rodwell, who was to become the next great Tasmanian batsman of the following generation. Morrisby continued playing first-class cricket until the 1951–52 season, when he retired at the age of 37. In 51 matches, Morrisby had accumulated 2596 runs at an average of 32.45 including 3 centuries, and 14 half-centuries, with a high score of 145. Ronald Morrisby also umpired in a match between Southern Tasmania Cricket Association and the North-West Tasmania Cricket Association in 1955–56.
