= Vaziri =

Vaziri (Persian: وزیری, Vazīri) is an Iranian surname derived from the word Vazir ‘minister’ (Persian: وزیر, Vazīr) and may refer to:

== People ==
- Ali-Naqi Vaziri (1887–1979), Iranian musicologist and composer
- Amir Vaziri (born 1979), Iranian footballer
- Kazem Vaziri Hamane, politician, minister
- Khosrow Vaziri (born 1942), Iranian wrestler known as The Iron Sheik
- Leila Vaziri (born 1985), American swimmer
- Mohsen Vaziri-Moghaddam (born 1924), Iranian artist, painter, and professor
- Qamar ol-Molouk Vaziri (1905–1959), Iranian vocalist and intellectual
- Shohreh Aghdashloo, (born Shohreh Vaziri-Tabar, 1952), actress

== Places in Iran ==
- Vaziri, Iran (disambiguation)

== See also ==
- Vazir (disambiguation)
- Waziri (disambiguation)
