= Edward Buultjens =

Personal information
- Full name: Edward Wilhelm Adolphus Buultjens
- Born: 18 February 1913; Matara, British Ceylon
- Died: May 1980 (aged 67); Sri Lanka
- Relatives: Rohan Buultjens (son)

International information
- National side: Ceylon (1935–1937)

Career statistics
Competition	FC
Matches	2
Runs scored	19
Batting average	4.75
100s/50s	0/0
Top score	10
Balls bowled	144
Wickets	2
Bowling average	34.00
5 wickets in innings	0
10 wickets in match	0
Best bowling	2/35
Catches/stumpings	1/–
- Source: CricketArchive, 22 April 2015

Edward Wilhelm Adolphus Buultjens (18 February 1913 – May 1980) was a Ceylonese cricketer who played first-class matches for Ceylon representative teams, the antecedents of the current Sri Lankan national side.

Born in Matara, on the southern coast of what was then the crown colony of Ceylon, Buultjens was a member of a Burgher family that had been resident in the country since the 18th century, descended from a Flemish sailor. He was the fifth child (and third son) of John William Buultjens, who was headmaster of St. Thomas' College (a school known for its involvement in cricket), and also a local justice of the peace.

Edward Buultjens attended Trinity College, Kandy, and received his Lion (an equivalent of the English Blue) in rugby union in 1933. His first recorded cricket match for Ceylon came during the 1935–36 season, when a Marylebone Cricket Club (MCC) side stopped over in Colombo on its way to a tour of Australia and New Zealand. Buultjens made his first-class debut less than a week later, playing for Ceylon against the touring Australian side led by Frank Tarrant. On debut at Viharamahadevi Park in late October 1935, he came in third in the batting order in both innings, behind Douglas Lieversz and Louis Mendis. In the first innings he scored two runs before being bowled by Ron Oxenham, who finished with 9/18 from his 13 overs – all his victims were either bowled or leg before wicket. He fared no better in the second innings, bowled for a duck by Lisle Nagel, but he did take the wickets of Wendell Bill and Jack Ryder, finishing with 2/35.

Buultjens again played for Ceylon against the MCC during the 1936–37 season. Later in the season, he made his second and final first-class appearance, against a touring side organised by South African businessman Sir Julien Cahn. Buultjens opened the batting with Louis Mendis, making 10 and 7, bowled by the South African Test representative Bob Crisp on both occasions. Buultjens bowled nine overs in the South Africans' first innings, but failed to take a wicket. Most of the bowling was done by George Pereira, who finished with 7/158 from 55 overs. Buultjens died in Sri Lanka in May 1980, aged 67. His son, Rohan Buultjens, played cricket for Sri Lanka in the early 1980s.
