= Rizwan Aftab Ahmed =

Pakistani businessman

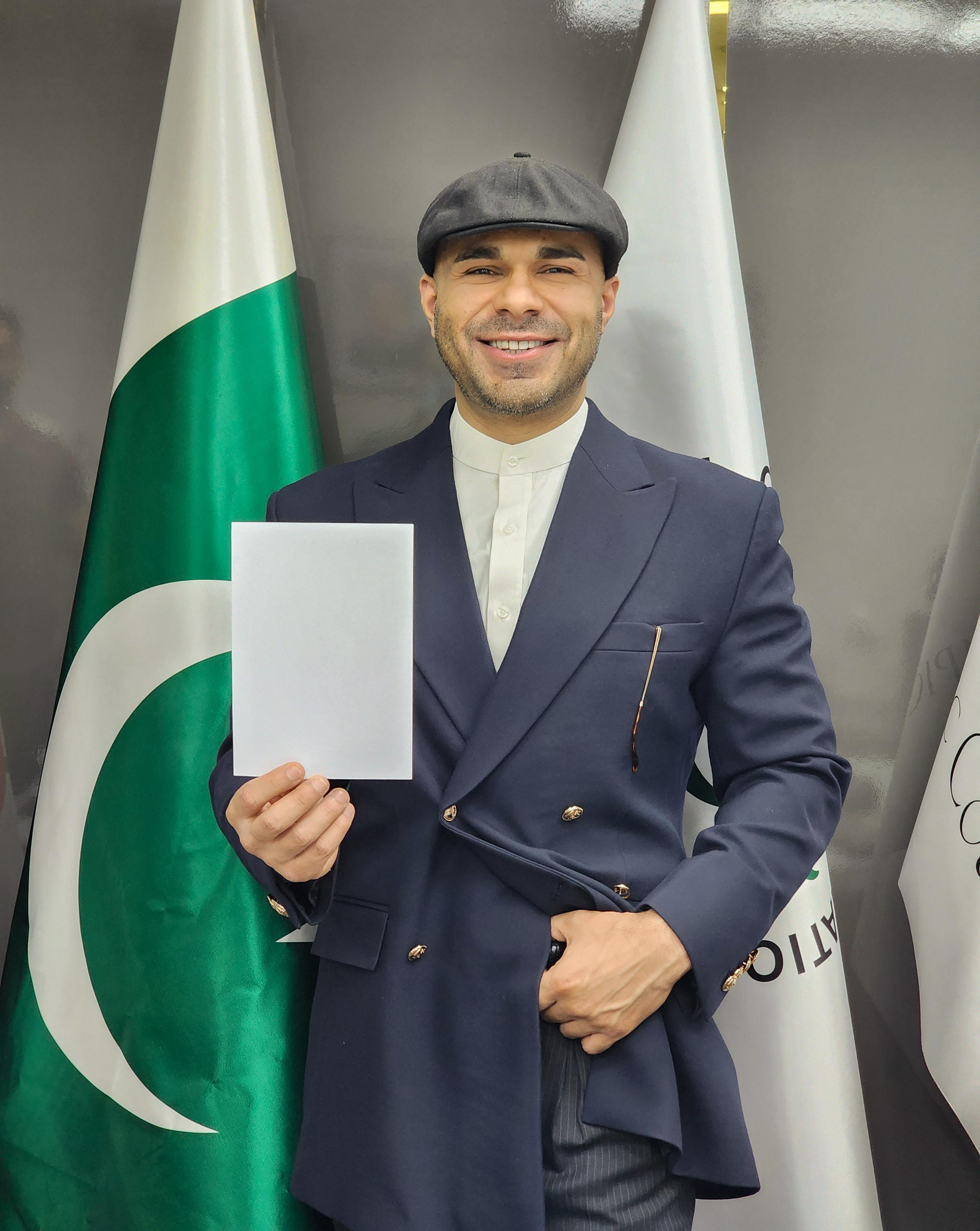
- Born: Pakistan
- Occupations: registered dietitian, healthcare entrepreneur
- Website: iamactivit.com

Rizwan Aftab Ahmed is a Pakistani dietitian, businessperson, and philanthropist. He is best known as the founder of ACTIVIT, a medical-grade nutritional supplement brand based in Pakistan.

== Early life and education ==
Rizwan's father, Prof. Dr. Aftab Ahmed, was a pioneer of orthopedics in Pakistan. He founded the orthopedic wing at Services Hospital, Lahore, and later established the National Hospital & Medical Centre in DHA Lahore. Rizwan's maternal grandfather, Iftikhar Ahmed Shah, was an athlete who represented Pakistan at the 1948 London Olympics. His third great-grandfather, Raja Ghazanfar Ali Khan, was a diplomat who served as Pakistan's Minister of Food, Agriculture, and Health following Pakistan independence in 1947 and was appointed as the first president of the Pakistan Hockey Federation. Rizwan's great-uncle was Faiz Ahmed Faiz, a noted poet and author. On his maternal side, his fourth great-grandfather, Syed Ghulam Haider Shah, was a spiritual leader in Jalalpur Sharif.

Rizwan graduated from Aitchison College. He then joined Queen's University at Kingston in Canada and obtained his BA degree in 2004, and later completed postgraduate certifications in Clinical Nutrition and Men's Health at Cornell University and Harvard Medical School.

== Career ==
In 2023, Rizwan launched ACTIVIT, a DRAP-registered multivitamin and supplement brand, aimed at providing high-quality nutrition affordably in Pakistan. The company provides nutritional, training, and medical support to athletes and lifetime free treatment at the National Hospital DHA. The revenues are channeled back to sports and welfare initiatives. During his tenure as Director of the National Hospital & Medical Centre, DHA Lahore, Rizwan has been active in athlete healthcare, contributing to the recovery and performance of several national athletes.

Rizwan has been assisting javelin thrower Arshad Nadeem since 2023. He supported Nadeem with injury recovery ahead of the 2024 Paris Olympics, facilitating specialized intervention and ongoing care under UK-based surgeon Dr. Ali Bajwa. Rizwan also arranged advanced medical imaging, including CT and MRI scans, as part of Nadeem's treatment plan. Rizwan supported Nooh Dastgir Butt with a monthly retainer and comprehensive lifeline healthcare for his family when his father suffered a heart crisis. Rizwan also assisted sprinter Shajar Abbas with injury management, including facilitating surgery.

He also established the ACTIVERSE, a collective of Pakistani sports figures sponsored by ACTIVIT that includes javelin thrower Arshad Nadeem, weightlifter Nooh Dastgir Butt, MMA striker Eman "Falcon" Khan, high-altitude mountaineer Shehroze Kashif, marathon runner Amin Mukaty, MMA fighter Rizwan Ali, triathlete Shahrez Khan, boxer Usman Wazeer, sprinter Shajar Abbas, and badminton player Mahoor Shahzad. Rizwan provided financial, medical, and nutritional support to boxer Usman Wazeer during a series of international professional fights. ACTIVIT sponsored six consecutive international bouts involving Wazeer, including contests against Indian opponents.

Under ACTIVIT, Rizwan signed former Pakistan fast bowler Shoaib Akhtar as a brand ambassador and expanded the company's athlete program to include professional cricketers through formal sponsorship agreements. The program provides nutritional support, medical coverage, and financial backing for participation in domestic and international tournaments. As part of this initiative, Rizwan has supported Pakistan Test captain Shaan Masood during overseas tours and league participation, and also sponsors Salman Ali Agha, Sajid Khan, and other national players. Under their agreements, athletes including Masood, Salman, and Sajid display the ACTIVIT logo on their equipment as part of their representation of the brand.

Rizwan provided support to marathon runner Amin Mukaty for his international marathon preparation and recovery management through ACTIVIT, including nutritional guidance and financial sponsorship during international competitions.

Rizwan sponsored Pakistan Combat Week 2024 and the Pakistan Open MMA Championship 2025. He served as the on-site medical director for both international competitions, where ACTIVIT implemented specialized sports medicine departments for athlete screening, emergency ringside care, and recovery management.

In September 2025, Rizwan arranged a training camp in the U.S., sponsoring training, nutrition, and medical support to prepare Nooh Dastgir Butt for the VIRUS Weightlifting Finals and UMWF World Championships, scheduled to be held in Daytona Beach, Florida. Rizwan supported Shahrez Khan's triathlon career, contributing to his development and performance in international competitions. They have jointly organised cross-country training camps at Aitchison College, where they mentor young Pakistani athletes in endurance sports. In October 2025, Shahrez Khan qualified for the Ironman 70.3 World Championship, which is scheduled to take place in Marbella, Spain, in November 2025. Rizwan Aftab provided financial, medical, and nutritional support to mixed martial artist Rizwan Ali during his participation in the Absolute Championship Akhmat (ACA), where Rizwan Ali defeated his Indian opponent.

During the partnership with ACTIVIT, Nooh Dastgir Butt competed in and achieved success at several international competitions, including the Pahlavon Mahmud Strongmen Games (OIC Open), the 2024 Commonwealth Classic Powerlifting Championship where he won seven gold medals and one bronze medal, the 2024 Asian Classic Powerlifting Championship where he set a 400kg Asian squat record, the 2024 Quaid-e-Azam Trophy National Classic Championship, and the 2025 World Strongman Championship in Uzbekistan, where he won two gold medals.

In November 2025, Rizwan Aftab, through ACTIVIT's athlete development program, partnered with tennis player Aisam-ul-Haq Qureshi, providing medical, nutritional, and financial support during Qureshi's participation in the ITF Masters 45+ World Championship in Turkey, where Qureshi won gold medals in the men's doubles and mixed doubles events. The collaboration continued at the ATP Challenger Cup 2025 in Pakistan.

Rizwan through ACTIVIT, supported Paralympic Athlete Haider Ali’s preparation during the period surrounding the 2024 Paris Paralympics and the 2026 World Para Athletics Grand Prix. The support included medical care, nutritional planning, and financial assistance intended to support training, recovery, and international competition.

In recognition of his maternal grandfather, Olympian Iftikhar Ahmed Shah, who represented Pakistan in swimming at the 1948 London Olympics, Rizwan supported the development of national-level swimmer Hamza Asif, providing medical supervision, nutritional guidance, performance diagnostics, and specialized training equipment through ACTIVIT. Rizwan also contributed to Hamza’s participation in the 2026 Asian Beach Games. Hamza's strength and conditioning training was provided in collaboration with Omar Ahmed (businessman), President of the Pakistan MMA Federation and CEO of Brave Gym Lahore.

On April 30, 2026, Rizwan signed a memorandum of understanding (MoU) between the ACTIVIT Welfare Foundation and the Lahore Arts Council (Alhamra) to establish cooperation on youth-focused programs in sports, the arts, wellness, and culture.

In May 2026, Rizwan and ACTIVIT Welfare Foundation sponsored and organized the ACTIVIT Margalla Triathlon in Islamabad in collaboration with Margalla Trail Runners. The ACTIVIT Margalla Triathlon was the first Olympic-format open-water triathlon held in Pakistan. It featured Olympic-and sprint-distance races and was held in connection with Youm-e-Marka-e-Haq and was dedicated to Pakistan’s armed forces and martyrs. In the same month, Rizwan and ACTIVIT sponsored Pakistani ultra-runner Waqar Ahmad Nasir during his successful title defense at the Seychelles Nature Trail Challenge.

In July 2026, Rizwan, through ACTIVIT, partnered with the Pakistan Mixed Martial Arts Federation (PAKMMAF) to launch the PAKMMAF ACTIVIT Contender Series, a competition platform intended to prepare Pakistani mixed martial artists for international competition.

== Awards and recognition ==
In December 2025, Rizwan Aftab Ahmed was honoured by the Governor of Punjab, Pakistan, Sardar Saleem Haider Khan, with two Certificates of Achievement in recognition of his work on sports, healthcare, and community services in Pakistan for his roles as CEO of ACTIVIT and as the Director of the National Hospital & Medical Centre, DHA Lahore.

In April 2026, Rizwan was honoured by the Pakistan Olympic Association (POA) in recognition of his contributions to the development and promotion of sports in Pakistan, particularly his support for athletes and national sports initiatives. The recognition was presented during the Pakistan Olympic Association's General Council meeting held in Lahore, where POA Secretary General Muhammad Khalid Mahmood acknowledged his services to Pakistani sports.

In May 2026, the Pakistan Sports Board (PSB) conferred its highest honour on Rizwan in recognition of his support for Pakistani athletes through financial assistance, medical care, nutrition, and performance services. The honour was presented by PSB Director General Muhammad Yasir Pirzada.
