= Buultjens =

Buultjens is a surname. Notable people with the surname include:

- Dooland Buultjens (1933–2004), Sri Lankan cricket umpire
- Edward Buultjens (1913–1980), Ceylonese cricketer
