= Vazirov =

Vazirov (Azerbaijani: Vəzirov) is an Azerbaijani surname. It is a slavicised version of Vazir. Notable people with the surname include:

- Abdurrahman Vazirov (1930–2022), Azerbaijani politician
- Hashim bey Vazirov (1868–1916), Azerbaijani journalist, writer and publisher
- Mir Hasan Vazirov (1889–1918), Azerbaijani politician and revolutionary
- Najaf bey Vazirov (1854–1926), Azerbaijani playwright and journalist
