= Wazir Khan =

Wazir Khan was a title bestowed by Mughal emperors, and may refer to:

- Wazir Khan (Lahore) (c 1560–1642), governor of Lahore
  - Wazir Khan Mosque, a mosque in Lahore commissioned by Khan when he was court physician
- Wazir Khan (Sirhind) (1635–1710), sub-governor of Sirhind
- Wazir Ali Khan (1780–1817), fourth nawab wazir of Oudh
- Wazir Akbar Khan (1816–1845), Afghan prince
  - Wazir Akbar Khan, Kabul, a neighbourhood of Kabul named after the Afghan prince
- Muhammad Wazir Khan (1834–1864), the second ruler of the princely state of Tonk
- Wazir Arsala Khan (19th century), Afghan politician
- Wazir Khan (Rampur) (1860–1926), chief musician of Rampur State and a descendant of Naubat Khan

== See also ==
- Wazir Khanum, Mughal princess, mother of 19th-century Indian Urdu poet Daagh Dehlvi
- Wazir (disambiguation)
- Khan (title)
- Khan (surname)
