= Nazir Ali =

Nazir Ali may refer to:

- Nazir Ali (cricketer) (1906–1975), a prominent player from the early days of Indian cricket.
- Nazir Ali (musician) (1945–2003), a Pakistani film music director
- Michael Nazir-Ali (born 1949), a Pakistani-born British Roman Catholic priest.
