= J. W. Hearne =

English cricketer (1891–1965)

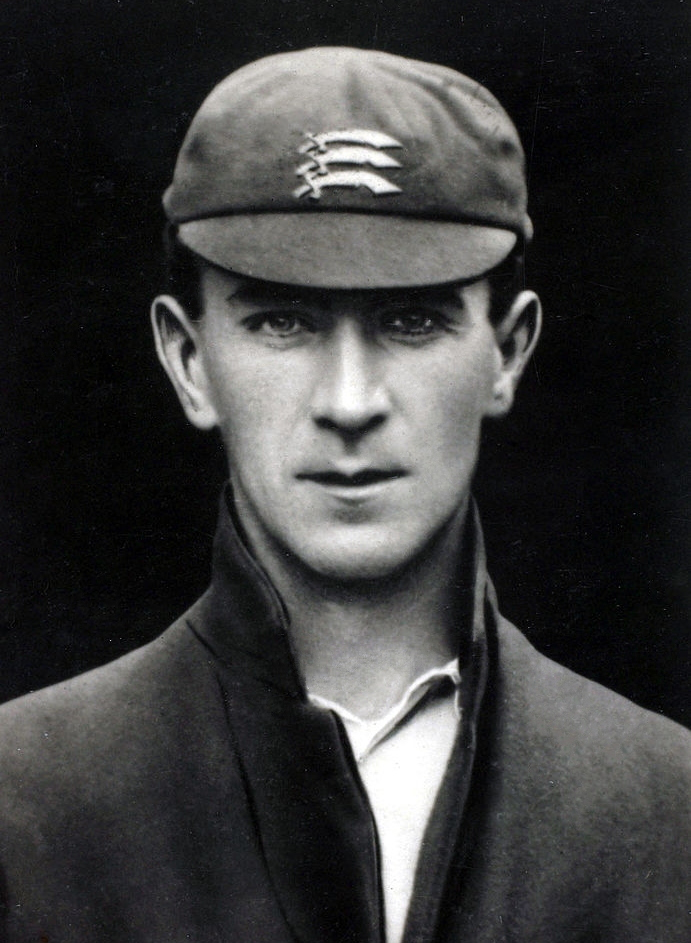
- Hearne on a 1922 card

Personal information
- Full name: John William Hearne
- Born: 11 February 1891; Hillingdon, England
- Died: 14 September 1965 (aged 74); West Drayton, England
- Nickname: Young Jack
- Batting: Right-handed
- Bowling: Right arm leg break

International information
- National side: England
- Test debut (cap 172): 15 December 1911 v Australia
- Last Test: 15 June 1926 v Australia

Domestic team information
- Years: Team
- 1909–1936: Middlesex

Career statistics
| Competition | Test | First-class |
|---|---|---|
| Matches | 24 | 647 |
| Runs scored | 806 | 37,252 |
| Batting average | 26.00 | 40.98 |
| 100s/50s | 1/2 | 96/159 |
| Top score | 114 | 285* |
| Balls bowled | 2,926 | 93,615 |
| Wickets | 30 | 1,839 |
| Bowling average | 48.73 | 24.42 |
| 5 wickets in innings | 1 | 107 |
| 10 wickets in match | 0 | 23 |
| Best bowling | 5/49 | 9/61 |
| Catches/stumpings | 13/– | 346/– |
- Source: Cricinfo, 29 September 2009

John William Hearne (known as Jack Hearne, J. W. Hearne and Young Jack to distinguish him from his distant cousin, J. T. Hearne; 11 February 1891 – 14 September 1965) was a Middlesex leg-spinning all-rounder cricketer who played from 1909 to 1936, and represented England in 24 Test matches between 1911 and 1926.

A skilful right-handed batsman, Hearne was exceptionally straight and a master at placing the ball into gaps. He was not an aggressive batsman, but his skill allowed him to score at quite an efficient rate against the best bowling. He bowled leg spin from a very short run-up, but had such speed of action that he was almost medium pace.

He was born on 11 February 1891 in Hillingdon, and was highly successful in local games even as a teenager, so that Middlesex engaged him soon after his eighteenth birthday in 1909. He was an immediate success with his sharp spin, coming second in the Middlesex averages behind Frank Tarrant, whilst in 1910, though erratic, he accomplished a sensational performance against Essex, taking 7 wickets for 2 runs in 25 balls. That year, still a teenager, Hearne made two hundred for Middlesex, and in the dry summer of 1911, he went from strength to strength. His major feats that year were 234 against Somerset, 6 for 17 against Essex and nine wickets in nine overs for 40 runs against Surrey, all at Lord's. In all, he took 102 wickets and scored 1627 runs at an average of 42.81, and was named as a Cricketer of the Year by Wisden.

In 1911/1912, Hearne toured Australia with one of the strongest England sides ever. He played in all the Tests, but was utterly hopeless as a bowler on Australian pitches both then and in 1920/1921 and 1924/1925, and it is not really clear why. He had the spin and the pace from the ground to succeed on rock-hard pitches, but he lacked flight and could rarely persist for long enough to be effective in a long struggle. As a batsman, he did very well in the first two Tests, with 114 at the Melbourne Cricket Ground, his only Test hundred. He became the youngest England player to score a Test century, a record broken only by Denis Compton in 1938. Hearne's and Compton's Test centuries remain the only ones scored by England players before their 21st birthday. In Hearne's case, however, his performances against Australia declined sharply afterwards.

In the following years, Hearne's all-round cricket, along with that of Frank Tarrant was a remarkable combination only paralleled by George Herbert Hirst and Wilfred Rhodes at Yorkshire. Though his opportunities were restricted in 1912, the following two years Hearn accomplished the remarkable feat of scoring 2000 runs and taking 100 wickets in a season, and he went to South Africa in 1913/1914. On the matting wickets, his bowling was much more formidable than in Australia, but with S. F. Barnes in irresistible form, he was barely needed.

After a disappointing season in 1919, Hearne's all-round play won Middlesex the County Championship in 1920, but, like all English spin bowlers of the time, he was remarkably hopeless on the rock-hard Australian wickets and accomplished little even with the bat. His bowling was affected by injury in 1921, but for the following three years his position as one of the country's premier all-rounders remained intact, with his batting skill on rain-affected wickets having few equals. However, from 1925 his bowling skill declined, though he was good enough as a batsman for England selection in 1926, and he remained a force to be reckoned with in county cricket into the 1930s – despite a major injury when fielding in 1928. In 1929, Hearne hit 285 not out against Essex at Leyton and on a very dusty wicket at Chesterfield in 1933 recalled his former bowling skill by taking 9 for 61, the best figures of his career.

However, from this time Hearne was losing his batting skill as well as his bowling, and his averages in the very favourable summers of 1933 and 1934 suggested his days were numbered. His poor form on the leatherjacket-infested wickets at Lord's in 1935 led to him being dropped during July, and after a short recall, after the opening match of 1936.

Over his career Hearne played in 465 first-class matches and batted in 744 innings (73 not out). He scored 27,612 runs at an average of 41.15, with a highest score of 285 not out. He scored 71 centuries and 115 half-centuries. He took 240 catches. He took 1.438 wickets off 72,082 deliveries at an average of 23.15 with a best bowling analysis of 9 wickets for 61 runs. He took five wickets in an innings on 88 occasions and ten wickets in a match 17 times.

After he was released by Middlesex at the end of that year, Hearne became a life member of the Marylebone Cricket Club (MCC) in 1949. He died on 14 September 1965 in West Drayton.
