= Waziri =

Waziri may refer to:

- Vizier when rendered in the Hausa and Fula languages
- Wazir (Pashtun tribe) from Waziristan
- Wazir (Khogyani clan) in southern Nangarhar Province, Afghanistan
- Waziri language, spoken by the Waziris of Waziristan
- Waziri (sheep), a breed of sheep originating in Waziristan
- Something or someone originating from Waziristan
- The family name of the Sokoto Grand Vizier
- The family name of Farida Mzamber Waziri, Chairman of Nigeria's Economic and Financial Crimes Commission and mentioned in many scam emails
- Mostafa Waziri, secretary-general of the Supreme Council of Antiquities of Egypt
- Waziri (fictional tribe), a fictional African tribe in the Tarzan novels and their adaptions

== See also ==
- Wazir (disambiguation)
