= Richard Bryant (Western Australia cricketer) =

Australian cricketer

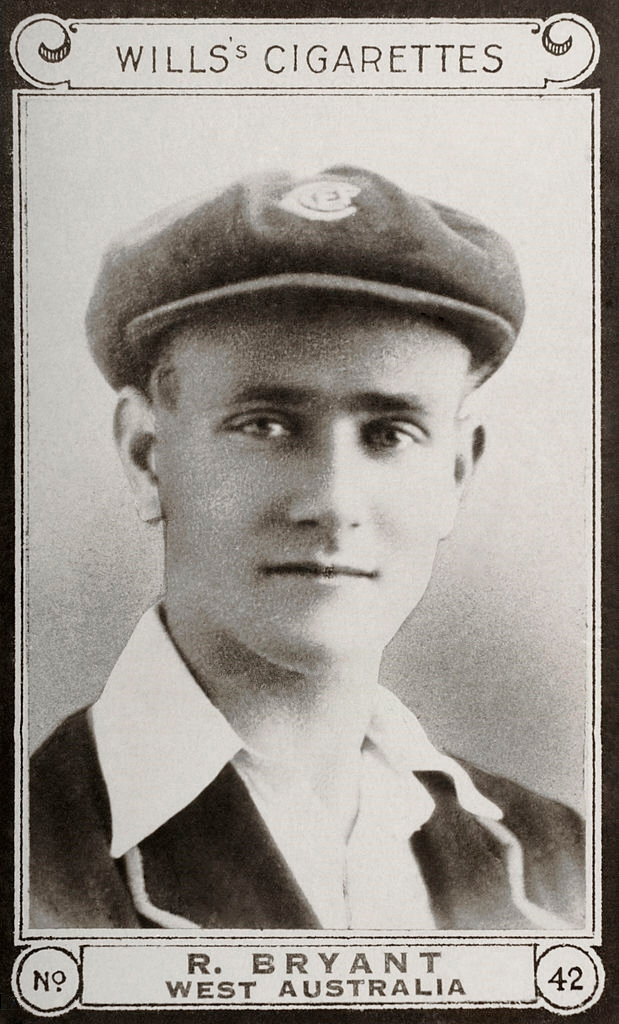

Personal information
- Born: 8 May 1904; Perth, Western Australia
- Died: 17 August 1989 (aged 85); Mount Lawley, Western Australia

Domestic team information
- Years: Team
- 1924/25–1935/36: Western Australia

Career statistics
Competition	First-class
Matches	29
Runs scored	1,088
Batting average	22.66
100s/50s	1/4
Top score	103
Balls bowled	1,642
Wickets	20
Bowling average	37.40
5 wickets in innings	0
10 wickets in match	0
Best bowling	4/48
Catches/stumpings	15/–
- Source: Cricinfo, 18 July 2017

Richard Bryant (8 May 1904 – 17 August 1989) was an Australian cricketer. He played 29 first-class matches for Western Australia between 1924 and 1936. His brothers Bill and Frank also played for Western Australia. In fact, when Bill played his only first-class match in March 1927, Richard and Frank were also on that Western Australia team.

Richard later managed the Western Australia team and brought it to winning the 1947–48 Sheffield Shield season.
