= Frank Bryant (cricketer) =

Australian cricketer

Personal information
- Full name: Francis Joseph Bryant
- Born: 7 November 1909; Perth, Western Australia
- Died: 11 March 1984 (aged 74); Glendalough, Western Australia
- Batting: Right-handed
- Relatives: Dick Bryant (brother)

Domestic team information
- Years: Team
- 1926/27–1936/37: Western Australia

Career statistics
Competition	First-class
Matches	35
Runs scored	1571
Batting average	27.56
100s/50s	3/6
Top score	155
Balls bowled	14
Wickets	0
Bowling average	–
5 wickets in innings	–
10 wickets in match	–
Best bowling	–
Catches/stumpings	12/–
- Source: Cricinfo, 18 July 2017

Francis Joseph Bryant OAM (7 November 1909 – 11 March 1984) was an Australian cricketer who played first-class cricket for Western Australia from 1927 to 1936. He later became Western Australia's leading cricket administrator.

== Cricket playing career ==
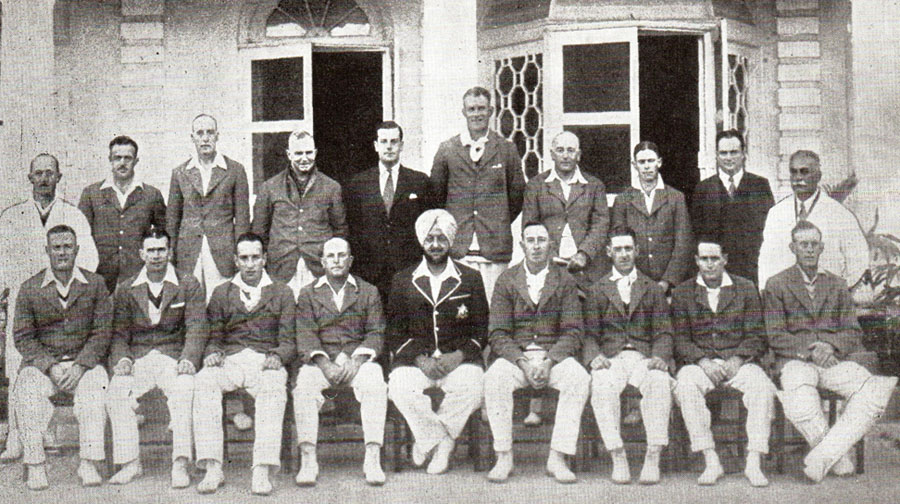
The 1935-36 Australian team in India. Frank Bryant is seated at the far left.

Bryant attended Christian Brothers' College, Perth, where in the 1927 season he scored more than 1000 runs in the First XI. Playing in the era before Western Australia was admitted to the Sheffield Shield, he made his first-class debut for Western Australia at the age of 17 in March 1927, alongside his older brothers Dick and Bill (who was playing his only first-class match) against South Australia at the WACA Ground in Perth. The next season, in a match at the WACA Ground against Victoria, he scored 113 not out in the second innings after Western Australia had trailed by 194 runs on the first innings. In 1933-34 he and Dick each made a century when Western Australia narrowly failed to achieve an innings victory over Victoria at the Melbourne Cricket Ground.

In 1935-36 he toured India with Frank Tarrant's Australian team. He made his highest first-class score of 155 in the match against Bombay (where the Australians only needed to bat once, after imposing the follow-on) and played in all four matches against India.

== Cricket administrative career ==
After service in the army in World War II Bryant went into the hotel business. He became Western Australia's most prominent cricket administrator. In the 1950s he successfully argued that Western Australia should play a full Sheffield Shield program, and later he was one of the leading advocates for Test status for the WACA Ground, which was achieved in 1970. He managed the Australian teams that toured New Zealand in 1966-67, 1969–70 and 1973-74. For his services to cricket he was awarded the Medal of the Order of Australia in 1981 and the Australian Sports Medal posthumously in 2000.
