= John Ellis (Victoria cricketer) =

Australian cricketer (1890–1974)

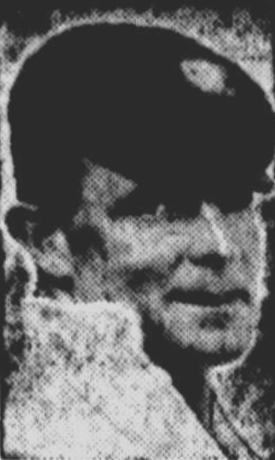

Personal information
- Full name: John Leslie Ellis
- Born: 9 May 1890; Malvern, Melbourne, Australia
- Died: 26 July 1974 (aged 84); Glen Iris, Melbourne, Australia
- Batting: Right-handed
- Bowling: Wicketkeeper

Domestic team information
- Years: Team
- 1918/19–1929/30: Victoria

Career statistics
Competition	First-class
Matches	101
Runs scored	2,351
Batting average	21.18
100s/50s	2/8
Top score	119
Catches/stumpings	187/107
- Source: Cricinfo, 6 June 2024

John Leslie Ellis (9 May 1890 – 26 July 1974) was an Australian cricketer. He played 101 first-class cricket matches, mostly for Victoria, between 1918 and 1930. He also toured with Australian teams to England in 1926 as reserve wicket-keeper and to India and Ceylon in 1935–36 as main wicket-keeper.
