= Vaziri, Iran =

Vaziri (Persian: وزيري) may refer to:

- Vaziri, Hormozgan
- Vaziri, Yazd
