= Vazir =

Vazir may refer to:

- Vazir Agha, Pakistani writer
- Yusif Vazir Chamanzaminli, Azerbaijani writer
- Vazir, Iran
- Vizier, high-ranking political advisor or minister in Islamic states

== See also ==
- Vaziri (disambiguation)
- Wazir (disambiguation)
