= Lisle Nagel =

Australian cricketer

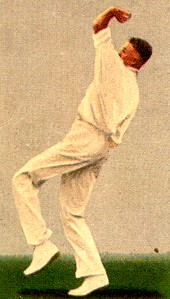

Personal information
- Born: 6 March 1905; Bendigo, Victoria, Australia
- Died: 23 November 1971 (aged 66); Mornington, Victoria, Australia
- Batting: Right-handed
- Bowling: Right-arm fast-medium

International information
- National side: Australia
- Only Test (cap 144): 2 December 1932 v England

Career statistics
Competition	Tests	First-class
Matches	1	26
Runs scored	21	407
Batting average	21.00	12.33
100s/50s	0/0	0/0
Top score	21*	44
Balls bowled	262	4611
Wickets	2	67
Bowling average	55.00	28.35
5 wickets in innings	0	3
10 wickets in match	0	0
Best bowling	2/110	8/32
Catches/stumpings	0/0	12/0
- Source: Cricinfo

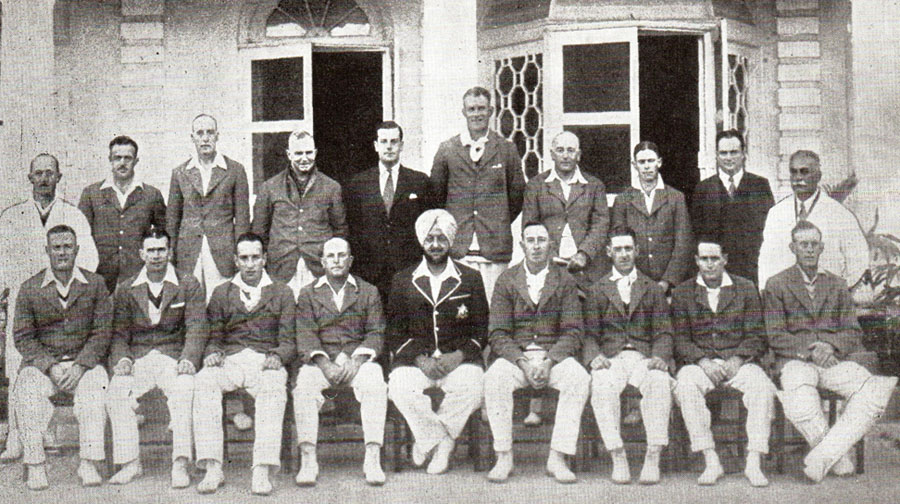
The 1935-36 Australian team in India. Lisle Nagel is the tall man in the back row.

Lisle Ernest Nagel (born 6 March 1905, Bendigo, Victoria — died 23 November 1971, Mornington, Victoria) was an Australian cricketer who played in one Test in 1932.

A tall right-arm fast bowler, Nagel played one match for Victoria in 1927–28, then played regularly between 1930–31 and 1933–34. He took 19 wickets at 25.05 in the 1931–32 season, including 6 for 35 against South Australia.

He was selected for an Australian XI that played the MCC in Melbourne in November 1932, and took 8 for 32 in the second innings to dismiss the MCC for 60. He played in the First Test that followed shortly afterwards, and took two wickets, but was left out of the Second Test.

He toured India and Ceylon with Frank Tarrant's Australian team in 1935–36.

Lisle played 139 First XI Victorian district cricket matches for Melbourne between 1927 and 1947, taking 438 wickets at 14.74. He took 86 wickets in the 1939-40 season, which as of 2021 stands as the most by a bowler in a district cricket season.

His twin brother, Vernon, also played first-class cricket for Victoria.

== See also ==
- One Test Wonder
- List of Victoria first-class cricketers
