= Ambrose Tarrant =

Australian cricketer

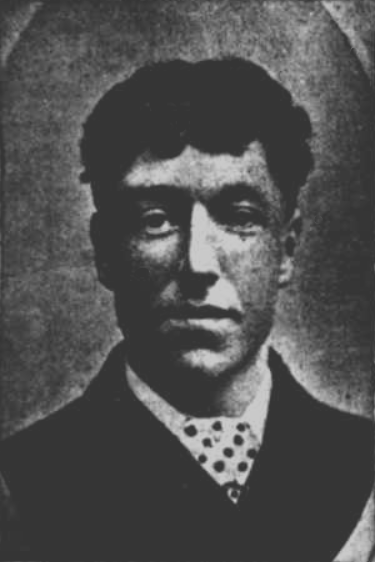

Personal information
- Full name: William Ambrose Tarrant
- Born: 22 September 1866; Fitzroy, Colony of Victoria
- Died: 1 November 1938 (aged 72); Fitzroy North, Victoria, Australia
- Batting: Right-handed
- Role: Batsman
- Relatives: FA Tarrant (nephew); LBN Tarrant (grandnephew)

Domestic team information
- Years: Team
- 1890–1898: Victoria

Career statistics
Competition	FC
Matches	9
Runs scored	233
Batting average	17.92
100s/50s	0/1
Top score	82
Catches/stumpings	4/–
- Source: CricketArchive, 11 January 2015

William Ambrose Tarrant (22 September 1866 – 1 November 1938) was an Australian cricketer who played at first-class level for Victoria during the 1890s.

A right-handed batsman born in Fitzroy, Tarrant made his debut for Victoria in January 1890, playing a standalone fixture against Tasmania at the TCA Ground in Hobart. His career continued until the 1897–98 season, with little success. In total, Tarrant played nine first-class matches, scoring 233 runs at an average of 17.92. Only one of those matches came in the Sheffield Shield, which had been instituted for the 1892–93 season, and Tarrant's final three matches came against Tasmania and Western Australia, neither of which played Shield matches at the time owing to their relative weakness. His highest first-class score (and only half-century) had come in Sydney in January 1892, an innings of 82 runs against New South Wales that helped Victoria win by an innings and 15 runs.

Outside of inter-colonial matches, Tarrant had a long and successful career for the South Melbourne and Fitzroy Cricket Clubs in VCA Pennant matches. He had participated in the inaugural 1889–90 premiership season, which succeeded an earlier Challenge Cup, and played regularly up until the 1909–10 season, by which time he was 43. His final career tally of 142 matches includes a one-off appearance for Fitzroy against University during the 1921–22 season, at the age of 55. Tarrant's nephew, Frank Tarrant, was a noted all-rounder who played over 300 first-class matches for Australian, English, and Indian teams. Frank Tarrant's son, Louis Tarrant, played a single first-class match and also umpired at first-class level.

== See also ==
- List of Victoria first-class cricketers
