= Jim Atkinson =

Australian rules footballer and cricketer

- Born: James Archibald Atkinson; 4 April 1896; Fitzroy North, Victoria
- Died: 11 June 1956 (aged 60); Beaconsfield, Tasmania
Australian rules football career
Personal information
- Height: 175 cm (5 ft 9 in)
- Weight: 72 kg (159 lb)
Playing career^{1}
Years	Club	Games (Goals)
1917–1925	Fitzroy	112 (0)
1926–1930	Lefroy (TFL)	
- ^{1} Playing statistics correct to the end of 1925.
Career highlights
- VFL premiership player: 1922; Fitzroy Club Champion: 1922
- Cricket career
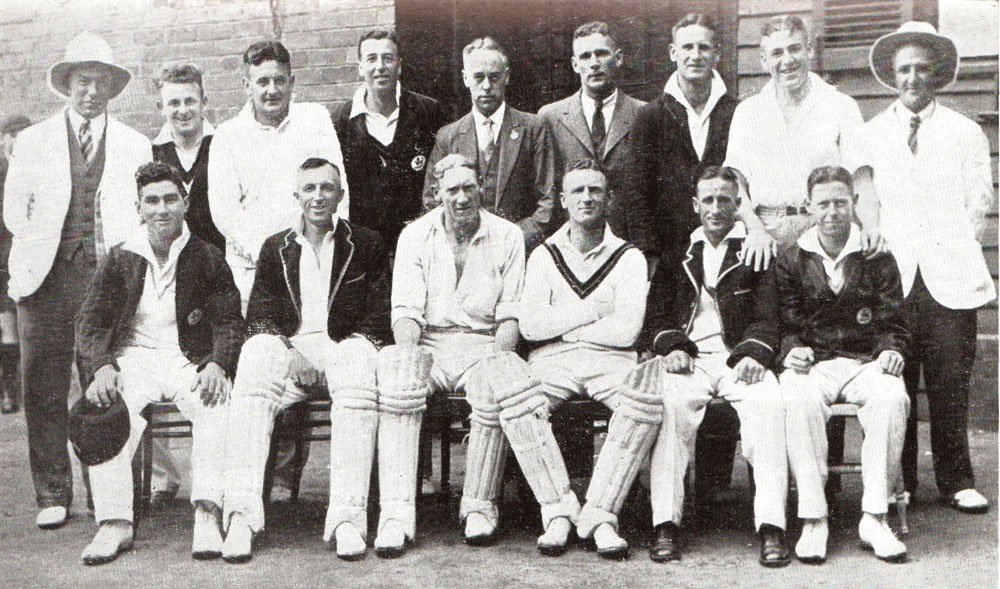
- The Tasmanian cricket team in 1932. Atkinson is seated third from left.

Cricket information
- Batting: Right-handed
- Bowling: Right-arm off-break
- Role: Batsman, occasional wicket-keeper

Domestic team information
- Years: Team
- 1921-22 – 1925-26: Victoria
- 1926-27 – 1933-34: Tasmania

Career statistics
Competition	FC
Matches	26
Runs scored	1408
Batting average	32.74
100s/50s	2/8
Top score	144*
Balls bowled	428
Wickets	4
Bowling average	74.50
5 wickets in innings	0
10 wickets in match	0
Best bowling	2/35
Catches/stumpings	33/2
- Source: cricinfo.com, 1 December 2008

James Archibald "Snowy" Atkinson (4 April 1896 – 11 June 1956) was an Australian rules footballer and first class cricketer.

== Family ==
The son of Michael James Atkinson, and Margaret Atkinson, née Markland, James Archibald Atkinson was born in Fitzroy North, Victoria on 4 April 1896. He married Mary Agnes McLoughlin in 1919.

== Football ==
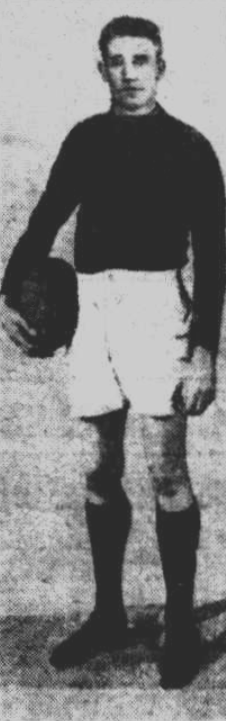
Atkinson in 1922.

Atkinson played his football with Fitzroy in the VFL from 1917 to 1925. He was a defender, and in 1922 was a member of Fitzroy's premiership side as well as winning their Club Champion award. Atkinson was club captain in 1924 and 1925.

He moved to Tasmania in 1926 and finished his footballing career with Lefroy. He represented Tasmania at the interstate football carnival in Melbourne in 1927. He broke "virtually every bone in his body" during his career, and his injuries finally forced him out of the game in 1930.

== Cricket ==
In cricket, Atkinson played 26 first-class games for Victoria and Tasmania between 1921–22 and 1933–34. "Probably Tasmania's greatest cricket captain" in the years before it entered the Sheffield Shield, he led the team in 19 first-class matches from 1928–29 to 1932–33.

An opening batsman, in 1927-28 he carried his bat for 144 not out against Victoria, and in 1929-30 he did it again, with 104 not out. Nevertheless, Tasmania lost each time.

In the two matches against the touring MCC in 1928-29 he scored 17, 47, 20 and 30, the last three innings of which were Tasmania's top scores. Against the South Africans in 1931-32 he scored 90, 1, 48 and 55, again top-scoring three times.

The Oxford Companion to Australian Cricket described him as an "uncompromising opening batsman, capable of thunderous hooks and drives, as well as delicate late cuts, and a fine close-to-the-wicket fieldsman". In Tasmania's victory over Victoria in Melbourne in 1928-29 he took seven catches – five in the first innings and two in the second – as well as scoring 54, the second-highest score in the match.

=== Tasmanian Cricket Association record ===
Playing with the South Hobart Cricket Club in the Tasmanian Cricket Association (TCA) competition he scored 1,000 runs in four seasons out of five, including 1,000 runs in three successive seasons.

== Publican ==
After he retired from senior club cricket in 1935 he became a publican in Launceston.

== Death ==
He died at Beaconsfield, Tasmania on 11 June 1956.

== See also ==
- 1927 Melbourne Carnival
- List of Victoria first-class cricketers
- List of Tasmanian representative cricketers
