= Bill Bryant (cricketer) =

Australian cricketer

Personal information
- Born: 15 January 1906; Perth, Western Australia
- Died: 1 January 1995 (aged 88); Perth, Western Australia
- Source: Cricinfo, 26 September 2017

Bill Bryant (15 January 1906 – 1 January 1995) was an Australian cricketer. He played one first-class match for Western Australia in March 1927, alongside his brothers Dick and Frank also on the team. Bill also played for Maylands-Mt. Lawley.
