= Khalid Wazir =

Pakistani cricketer (1936–2020)

Personal information
- Full name: Syed Khalid Wazir
- Born: 27 April 1936; Jullundur, Punjab, British India
- Died: 27 June 2020 (aged 84); Chester, England
- Batting: Right-handed
- Bowling: Right-arm fast-medium
- Role: Batsman
- Relatives: Nazir Ali (uncle); Wazir Ali (father)

International information
- National side: Pakistan (1954)
- Test debut (cap 16): 10 June 1954 v England
- Last Test: 22 July 1954 v England

Career statistics
Competition	Test	First-class
Matches	2	18
Runs scored	14	271
Batting average	7.00	15.05
100s/50s	0/0	0/1
Top score	9*	53
Balls bowled	–	1,530
Wickets	–	14
Bowling average	–	53.28
5 wickets in innings	–	0
10 wickets in match	–	0
Best bowling	–	3/82
Catches/stumpings	0/–	11/–
- Source: ESPNcricinfo, 23 May 2023

Syed Khalid Wazir (27 April 1936 – 27 June 2020) was a Pakistani cricketer who played in two Test matches in 1954.

The Wazir Ali Summer League is named after him.

== Early education and family ==
Wazir was born on 27 April 1936 in Jullundur, Punjab. His father Wazir Ali played Test cricket for India in the 1930s. His family moved to Karachi after partition in 1947. He was educated at the St. Patrick's High School, Karachi. During his school days, he played in Rubie Shield inter-school cricket tournament.

== Career ==
Wazir was selected for the 1954 tour of England when his uncle, Syed Nazir Ali, was one of selector of the team, raising questions such as nepotism. He selection came after just two first-class matches in which he had made 18 runs and taken 5 wickets. In 16 first-class matches on the tour he made 253 runs at 16.86 as a middle-order batsman and took 9 wickets at 54.90. He played in the first and third Tests, batting in the lower order and not bowling. He played no more first-class cricket after the tour, and is thus the only Test cricketer whose first-class career ended before he turned 19.

He played one match as a professional for East Lancashire in the Lancashire League in 1957, taking 5 for 57.
