= Vazir, Iran =

Vazir وزير
- Village
- Location within Iran
- Coordinates: 36°00′39″N 47°15′43″E
- Country: Iran
- Province: Kurdistan
- County: Divandarreh
- Bakhsh: Central
- Rural District: Qaratureh

Population (2006)
  - Total: 454
- Time zone: UTC+3:30 (IRST)
  - Summer (DST): UTC+4:30 (IRDT)

Vazir (Persian: وزير, also Romanized as Vazīr) is a village in Qaratureh Rural District, in the Central District of Divandarreh County, Kurdistan Province, Iran. At the 2006 census, its population was 454, in 94 families. The village is populated by Kurds.
