= Omar Ahmed (businessman) =

Pakistani mixed martial arts executive

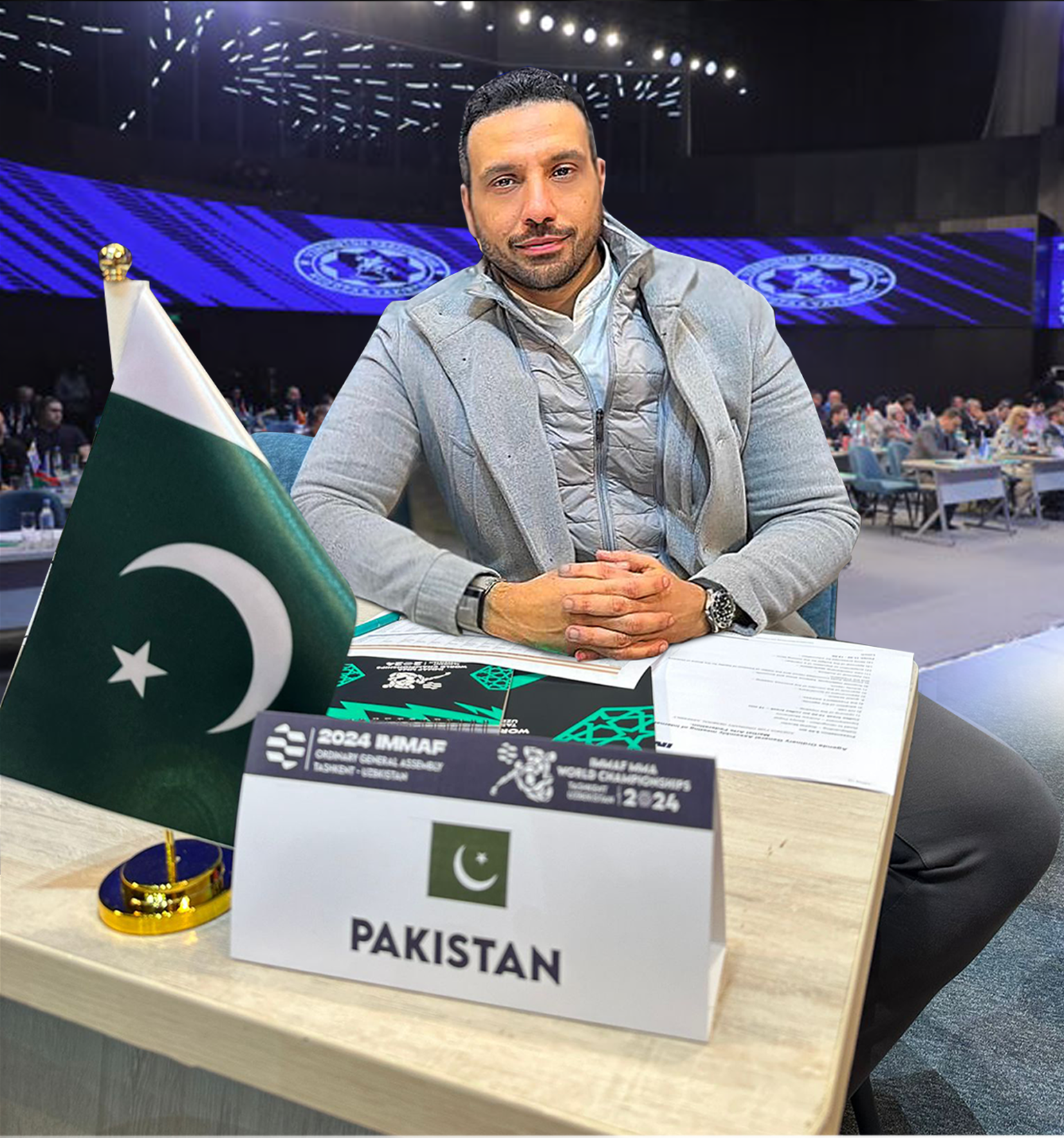
- Born: Pakistan
- Occupations: President of Pakistan Mixed Martial Arts Federation (PAKMMAF), CEO of BRAVE Gym.
- Website: pakmmafed.org

Omar Ahmed is a Pakistani mixed martial arts executive, former kick-boxer, security specialist and businessperson. He is the President of the Pakistan Mixed Martial Arts Federation (PAKMMAF), Director for South Asia on the International Mixed Martial Arts Federation (IMMAF), and a member of the IMMAF Police Sports Commission.

== Early life and education ==
Omar received his education in London, where he completed master's degrees in Strategic Communication, and Security and Risk Management.

== Career ==
Omar founded Train2Secure, which served as a security contractor for the 2012 London Olympics. He later moved to Pakistan, where he led Parwest Security, one of Pakistan's largest private security enterprises, where he was involved in high-risk operational planning and management.

In 2022, Omar was appointed president of the Pakistan MMA Federation, where he became responsible for the development of mixed martial arts in Pakistan.

In August 2024, he organised Pakistan Combat Week, featuring BRAVE CF 85 and the IMMAF Asian MMA Championship held in Lahore, Pakistan. The event, hosted in collaboration with Brave Combat Federation and the International Mixed Martial Arts Federation (IMMAF), was described as the largest international sporting competition held in Pakistan since the 1996 Cricket World Cup and the 2004 South Asian Games. The event featured over 300 athletes from 18 countries, with Pakistani fighters securing 12 medals, including two golds won by Eman Khan and Bano Butt. The event was broadcast in more than 100 countries in 15 languages and reached approximately 30 million viewers.

In December 2024, Omar led the Pakistani contingent to BRAVE CF 92 in Bahrain, where five Pakistani fighters recorded 5 consecutive victories against Indian opponents. The event noticed over 8,000 spectators.

In August 2025, under Omar's leadership, the federation staged the Pakistan Combat Night event, featuring quarterfinal matches and championship bouts featuring the Pakistan Open MMA Championship & Road to BRAVE in Lahore. The tournament served as a qualifying event for the IMMAF World Championships in Georgia and the Road to BRAVE 100. Eight Pakistani athletes qualified for the IMMAF World Championships in Georgia, while five fighters secured places on the Road to BRAVE 100 and the World Championship in Bahrain.

In October 2025, Omar personally funded the participation expenses of Pakistani fighters competing in the IMMAF World Championships in Georgia. These expenses included flight tickets, training camp fees, medical bills, and accommodation. The fighters won two silver medals through Shahab Ali and Abdul Manan, competing among more than 800 athletes from 72 countries.

In November 2025, Omar was elected to the IMMAF Police Sports Commission, the global platform that links the International Mixed Martial Arts Federation (IMMAF) with law enforcement and policing bodies.

=== Counter-extremism and rehabilitation ===
Omar has worked in the counter-extremism and de-radicalisation sectors during the peak of the war on terror. Through structured training and mentorship, he assisted at-risk youth in reintegrating into society.

=== Military and law enforcement training ===
Omar expanded the Federation's institutional outreach by designing and delivering specialised unarmed combat training programs for Pakistan’s security forces, including an MMA-based resilience and defensive-tactics module for the National Police Academy that has since been incorporated into its physical conditioning and decision-making curriculum. He also served as a guest instructor at the Special Operations School in Cherat, where he trained personnel from the Pakistan Special Services Group (SSG).

== Federation and gym initiatives ==
Omar serves as CEO of Brave Gym, a Lahore-based combat sports facility launched by Brave Combat Federation. The gym operates in partnership with Salman Iqbal and under the patronage of Sheikh Khalid bin Hamad Al Khalifa. The Federation also oversees the Real World Fight League (RWFL), a youth-focused MMA platform co-founded by Omar and Qaim Abass. The RWFL is designed to introduce young people in schools, colleges, and communities to structured MMA opportunities, and was shortlisted for the IMMAF Sustainability Awards for its social impact in youth development.

== Awards and recognitions ==
In September 2024, Prime Minister Shehbaz Sharif hosted a ceremony recognising the federation's achievements. Sharif praised Omar for hosting the event without government financial support, calling it "a new model of a self-sustaining sports economy."

In August 2025, Omar was honored with the Pride of Pakistan award by the Inter-Services Public Relations (ISPR) in recognition of his contributions to the combat sports. In September, the Real World Fight League and the Real Fight Project initiatives were shortlisted for the IMMAF Sustainability Awards in recognition of their social impact.
