= Vernon Nagel =

Australian cricketer (1905–1974)

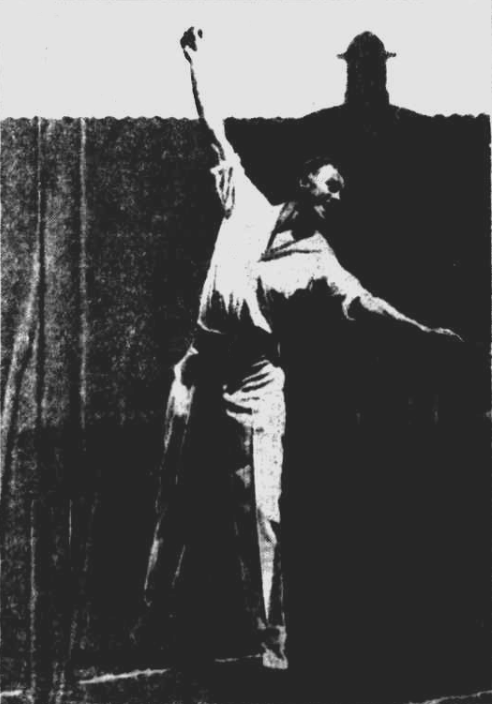

Personal information
- Born: 6 March 1905; Bendigo, Australia
- Died: 27 April 1974 (aged 69); Melbourne, Australia

Domestic team information
- Years: Team
- 1932-1936: Victoria
- Source: Cricinfo, 22 November 2015

Vernon Nagel (6 March 1905 – 27 April 1974) was an Australian cricketer. He played four first-class cricket matches for Victoria between 1932 and 1936.

== See also ==
- List of Victoria first-class cricketers
