= Frederick Mair =

Australian cricketer

Personal information
- Born: 15 April 1901; Sydney, Australia
- Died: 25 December 1959 (aged 58); Sydney, Australia
- Source: ESPNcricinfo, 6 January 2017

Frederick Mair (15 April 1901 – 25 December 1959) was an Australian cricketer. He played twenty-two first-class matches for New South Wales between 1933/34 and 1937/38.

== See also ==
- List of New South Wales representative cricketers
