= Wazir, Nangarhar =

Village in Afghanistan

Wazir وزير
- Village
- Location in Afghanistan
- Coordinates: 34°11′59″N 70°09′44″E
- Country: Afghanistan
- Province: Nangarhar Province
- District: Khogyani
- Time zone: UTC+4:30 (D† (Afghanistan Standard Time))

Wazir (Pashto: وزير) is a village in Khogyani District, Nangarhar Province, Afghanistan. It is the biggest village of the district. The population is Pashtun. Among the Khogyanis, the Lalai offshoot of the Wazirs live in the village.

== See also ==
- Nangarhar Province
