= Nazir Ali (cricketer) =

Indian cricketer (1906–1975)

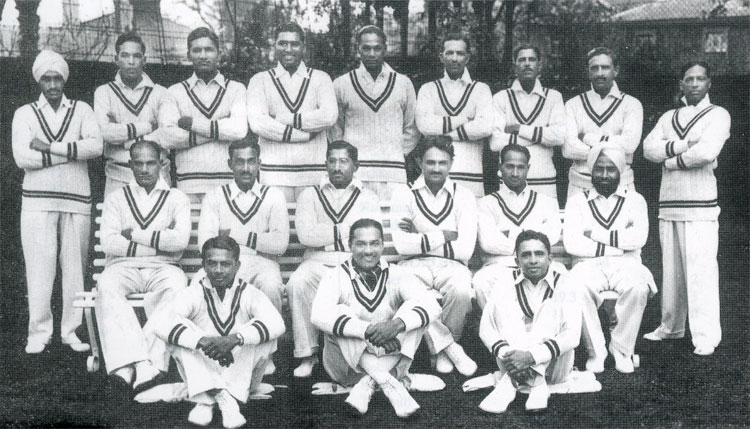
- The 1932 Indian Test Cricket team that toured England. Nazir Ali is seen sitting fifth on the bench starting with his brother, Syed Wazir Ali on the extreme left

Personal information
- Full name: Syed Nazir Ali
- Born: 8 June 1906; Jullundur, Punjab, British India
- Died: 18 February 1975 (aged 68); Lahore, Punjab, Pakistan
- Batting: Right-handed
- Bowling: Right-arm fast-medium
- Relatives: Wazir Ali (brother); Khalid Wazir (nephew)

International information
- National side: India (1932–1934)
- Test debut (cap 8): 25 June 1932 v England
- Last Test: 10 February 1934 v England

Career statistics
Competition	Test	First-class
Matches	2	75
Runs scored	30	3,440
Batting average	7.50	30.17
100s/50s	0/0	7/15
Top score	13	197
Balls bowled	138	8,360
Wickets	4	158
Bowling average	20.75	25.49
5 wickets in innings	0	6
10 wickets in match	0	0
Best bowling	4/83	7/93
Catches/stumpings	0/–	48/–
- Source: ESPNcricinfo, 10 May 2020

Syed Nazir Ali (8 June 1906 – 18 February 1975) was a prominent player from the early days of Indian cricket. Later, he migrated to Pakistan, where he played a few first-class matches and became an administrator. He was a Test selector from 1952 to 1968 and the Secretary of the Pakistan Cricket Board in 1953–54.

Nazir Ali was an attacking right-handed batsman, a fast-medium bowler, and a good fielder. He was the younger brother of Wazir Ali.

When MCC toured India in 1926/27, he impressed the MCC captain Arthur Gilligan who suggested that Nazir should qualify for Sussex. Some months later Nazir Ali wakened up the secretary of Sussex at 1 am asking for hospitality or to be sent where he could find it.

Nazir was lucky to have a patron in the Maharaja of Patiala who sent him to England to study electrical engineering. There he represented Sussex once and played in other matches, resuming his career in India four years later.

He played in India's first Test match in 1932 scoring 13 and 6 and picked up an injury while fielding during England's second innings. He scored 1020 runs and took 23 wickets in the tour. Nazir's most memorable feat was perhaps the 52, with five fours and three sixes, that he scored against Yorkshire out of India's 66 all out. No other batsmen scored more than three in that innings. This is still the lowest first class total to include an individual fifty.

Nazir played one other Test, against England at Madras in 1933/34. After 1947, he settled in Pakistan and was an administrator.
