= Wazir (Khogyani clan) =

Ethnic group in Afghanistan

The Wazir tribe (Pashto:وزیر) are one of the three major clans of the Khogyani tribe of Karlani Pashtun. The Wazir are primarily found in the southern and central regions of Nangarhar Province, Afghanistan, particularly Khogyani District and Pachir Aw Agam District.
