= Arthur Allsopp =

Australian cricketer

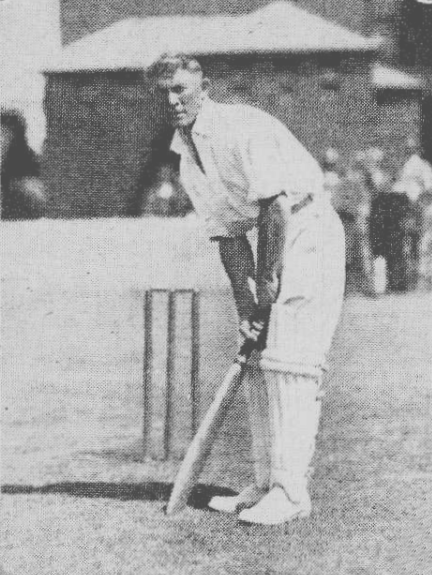

Personal information
- Born: 1 March 1908; Lithgow, New South Wales, Australia
- Died: 6 February 1993 (aged 84); Melbourne, Australia

Domestic team information
- Years: Team
- 1929/30–1930/31: New South Wales
- 1933/34–1934/35: Victoria
- Source: Cricinfo, 22 November 2015

Arthur Allsopp (1 March 1908 – 6 February 1993) was an Australian cricketer. He played five first-class cricket matches for Victoria between 1933 and 1935. He also played for Leeton.

== See also ==
- List of Victoria first-class cricketers
- List of New South Wales representative cricketers
