= Usman Wazeer =

Pakistani professional boxer

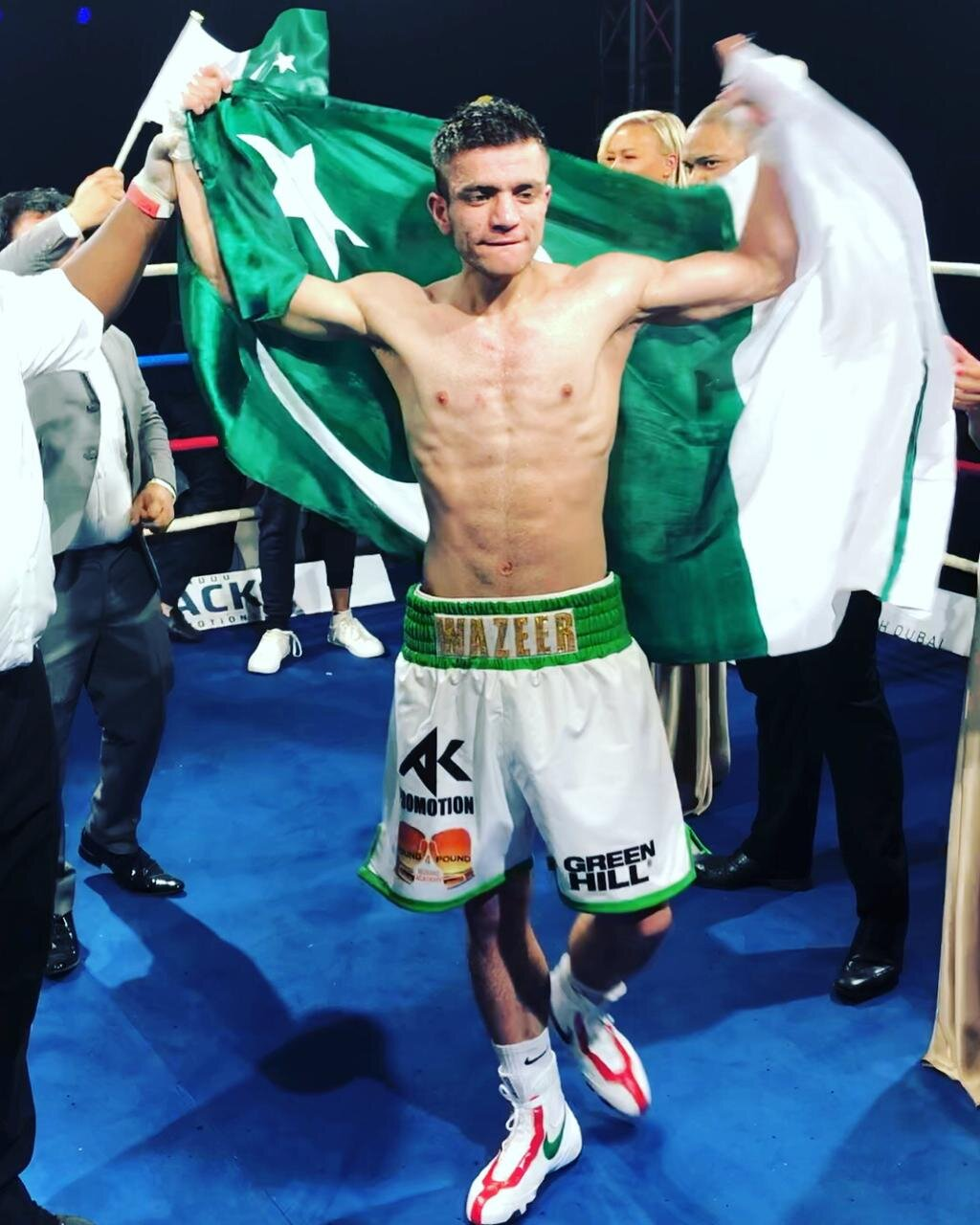

Personal information
- Nickname: Asian Boy
- Nationality: Pakistani
- Born: 16 April 2000 (age 26) Astore, Gilgit Baltistan, Pakistan
- Height: 5 ft 9 in (175 cm)
- Weight: Welterweight

Boxing career
- Reach: 71 in (180 cm)
- Stance: Orthodox

Boxing record
- Total fights: 18
- Wins: 18
- Win by KO: 13
- Losses: 0

Usman Wazeer (Urdu: عثمان وزیر; born 16 April 2000; commonly known as Usman ‘The Asian Boy’ Wazeer) is a Pakistani professional boxer.

== Professional boxing career ==
Wazeer began his professional boxing career in 2018 and made his debut in 2019 at welterweight.

=== Welterweight ===
==== Wazeer vs. Oubenais ====
Wazeer made his debut against the Moroccan Brahim Oubenais (0-1-0) at the FIVE Palm Jumeirah Hotel in Dubai. Wazeer won the fight by split decision after 4 rounds claiming his first professional victory.

==== Wazeer vs. Tamkhuntod ====
Wazeer won his second fight at the Jurado Hall of the Philippine Marine Corp after he TKO’d Visut Tamkhuntod (1-3-0) with a left body shot in the second round.

==== Wazeer vs. Simanjuntak ====
On 3 October 2020, Usman Wazeer faced Boido Simanjuntak at the Amir Khan Boxing Academy in Islamabad. The event was promoted by AK Promotions with Amir Khan as the promoter and sanctioned by the Pakistan Boxing Council (PBC). In the fifth round, Wazeer landed several solid body shots before delivering a right hook and left body combination, which resulted in a TKO victory over Simanjuntak. This win made Wazeer the first Pakistani boxer to capture the Asian Boxing Federation Welterweight Title.

==== Wazeer vs. Lopez ====
On 19 December 2020, Usman Wazeer defended his ABF Welterweight Title against Carlos Lopez (28-10-0) People’s Stadium Lyari, Karachi, Pakistan. The event was organized by Sikender Tajwar and sanctioned by the Pakistan Boxing Council (PBC). After an intense few rounds between the two fighters, in the sixth round Lopez fell to the canvas after injuring his knee. Unable to carry on Wazeer won the fight by TKO and retained the ABF Welterweight Title.

In 2021, Wazeer is set to become the first Pakistani Boxer to fight for the world youth title.

== Professional boxing record ==
16 fights	16 wins	0 losses
By knockout	11	0
By decision	5	0

No.	Result	Record	Opponent	Type	Round, time	Date	Location	Notes
16	Win	16-0	(India) Eswaran	UD	8	24 Apr 2025	World Siam Stadium, Thailand	
15	Win	15-0	(Tanzania) Albano Clement	UD	8	25 Jan 2025	DHA Phase 6 Sports Complex Lahore, Pakistan	
14	Win	14–0	(India) Thilak Selvam	TKO	1 (6), 1:40	26 Sep 2024	Spaceplus Bangkok RCA, Bangkok, Thailand	
13	Win	13–0	(Thailand) Petchdum Manopchaigym	TKO	3 (6), 0:43	27 Jun 2024	Spaceplus Bangkok RCA, Bangkok, Thailand	
12	Win	12–0	(Thailand) Namchai Chomkhamsri	TKO	3 (6), 2:17	30 Nov 2023	Spaceplus Bangkok RCA, Bangkok, Thailand	
11	Win	11–0	(Tanzania) Fikiri Salum Mohamed	UD	8	24 Jun 2023	Lalak Jan Stadium, Gilgit, Pakistan	Retained WBO Youth welterweight title
10	Win	10–0	(Thailand) Phatiphan Krungklang	TKO	7 (10), 2:11	3 Feb 2023	(United Arab Emirates) VIC MMA Gym, Dubai, UAE	Retained WBO Youth welterweight title
9	Win	9–0	(Thailand) Somphot Seesa	TKO	6 (10), 1:56	28 Sep 2022	Spaceplus Bangkok RCA, Bangkok, Thailand	Won vacant WBO Youth welterweight title
8	Win	8–0	(Thailand) Phatiphan Krungklang	RTD	2 (10), 3:00	11 Jun 2022	Lalak Jan Stadium, Gilgit, Pakistan	Won vacant WBA Asia welterweight title
7	Win	7–0	(Indonesia) Ramadhan Weriuw	KO	1 (10), 2:55	26 Mar 2022	(United Arab Emirates) Habtoor Grand Hotel, Dubai UAE	Retained Asian Boxing Federation welterweight title
6	Win	6–0	(Tanzania) Waziri Rosta	UD	8	15 Dec 2021	(United Arab Emirates) Cuban Boxing Club, Dubai, UAE	
5	Win	5–0	(Indonesia) Carlos Lopez	TKO	6 (10), 2:49	19 Dec 2020	People’s Stadium Lyari, Karachi, Pakistan	Retained Asian Boxing Federation welterweight title
4	Win	4–0	(Indonesia) Boido Simanjuntak	TKO	5 (10), 0:39	3 Oct 2020	Amir Khan Boxing Academy, Islamabad, Pakistan	Won vacant Asian Boxing Federation welterweight title
3	Win	3–0	(Thailand) Atthapon Baenkham	UD	4	14 Dec 2019	The Flash Grand Ballroom of the Elorde Sports Center, Manila, Philippines	
2	Win	2–0	(Thailand) Visut Tamkhuntod	TKO	2 (4), 2:58	7 Sep 2019	Jurado Hall of the Philippine Marine Corp, Manila, Philippines	
1	Win	1–0	(Morocco) Brahim Oubenais	SD	4	3 May 2019	(United Arab Emirates) FIVE Palm Jumeirah Hotel Dubai, Dubai, UAE	
