= Wazir Ali =

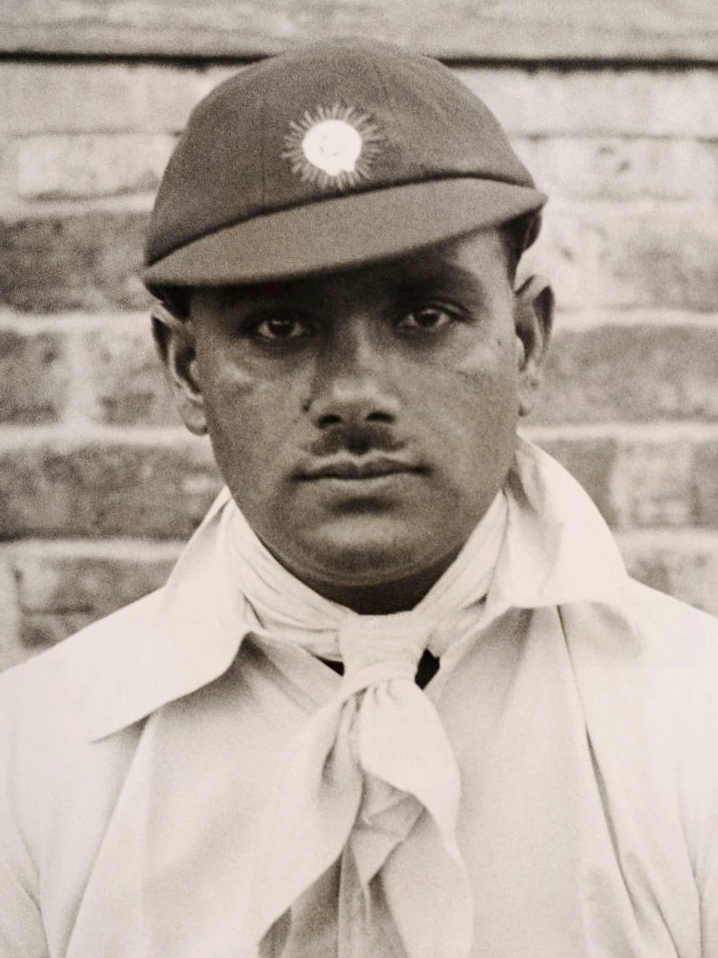
- Wazir Ali in 1932

Personal information
- Full name: Syed Wazir Ali
- Born: 15 September 1903; Jullundur, British Punjab, British India
- Died: 17 June 1950 (aged 46); Karachi, Sind, Pakistan
- Batting: Right-handed
- Bowling: Right-arm medium
- Role: All-rounder
- Relatives: Nazir Ali (brother); Khalid Wazir (son)

International information
- National side: India (1932–1936)
- Test debut (cap 11): 25 June 1932 v England
- Last Test: 15 August 1936 v England

Career statistics
Competition	Test	First-class
Matches	7	121
Runs scored	237	7,212
Batting average	16.92	38.77
100s/50s	0/0	22/21
Top score	42	268*
Balls bowled	30	2,308
Wickets	0	34
Bowling average	–	30.67
5 wickets in innings	–	1
10 wickets in match	–	0
Best bowling	–	5/22
Catches/stumpings	1/–	59/–
- Source: CricInfo, 10 May 2020

Syed Wazir Ali (15 September 1903 – 17 June 1950) was a prominent figure in early Indian cricket. He was a right-handed batsman and a medium pace bowler.

== Early life ==
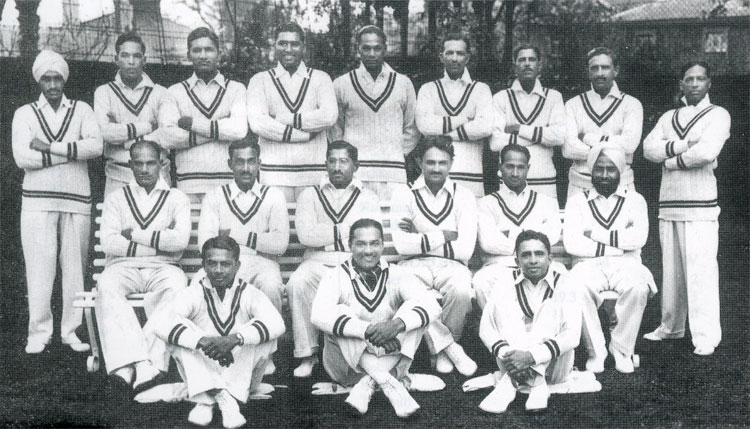
The 1932 Indian Test Cricket team that toured England. Syed Wazir Ali is seen sitting first on the bench followed by C. K. Nayudu, Maharaja of Porbandar (Captain), K. S. Limbdi (Vice-captain) and Nazir Ali, his brother.

Wazir played in all the Tests that India played before the second world war. In the tour of England in 1932, he scored 1229 runs in first class matches and 1725 overall. In the next tour in 1936 he was hampered by a hand injury but recorded his highest score of 42 in the Test at Manchester.

== First class cricket ==
Wazir was educated at Aligarh Muslim University. He made his first-class debut, aged 19, for Muslims against Sikhs at Lawrence Gardens (now Bagh-e-Jinnah), Lahore in the 1922-23 Lahore Tournament. For most of his first class career he played for Southern Punjab in the Ranji Trophy and Muslims in the Bombay Pentangular. His unbeaten 222 in the 1938/39 Ranji final against Bengal was then the highest in the tournament. Bengal had earlier been all out for 222, but Southern Punjab still ended up in the losing team. His career best score of 268 not out for Indian University Occasionals in 1935 was the highest score in Indian first class cricket. Both records were beaten by Vijay Hazare's undefeated 316 in 1939/40.

As a cricketing figure, Wazir Ali was second only to C.K. Nayudu among his contemporary Indian cricketers but he apparently resented it having to play second fiddle to Nayudu. Nayudu had many rivals and Wazir was often a stalking-horse for them. Mihir Bose contrasted the two: "To an extent Nayudu and Wazir Ali were natural rivals. Wazir, like Nayudu, was a powerful right-hand bat who could play some very elegant strokes including a charming cover drive, and he was also a more than useful medium-pace change bowler. Like Nayudu he played in only seven Tests, all against England, and did not have the opportunity to demonstrate his class or his ability to its full extent. What set the two men apart was that Wazir, eight years younger than Nayudu, did not possess the older man's determination and his obsession with the game. Nayudu was, undoubtedly the greater cricketer, and he left a deeper impression on the game … Wazir in contrast, died at the age of forty-six after an operation for appendicitis just three years after Pakistan was created, and he had little chance to impose his personality of the post-war game in that country.

Wazir captained India in two unofficial Tests against an Australian XI in 1935/36. Nayudu had captained the team in the first two matches of the series and dropped out of the matches in which Wazir captained the team. "Wazir went to his grave nursing a deep grievance against Nayudu", though it seems that Nayudu was genuinely unable to play.

== Later life ==
After the independence of Pakistan in 1947, Wazir migrated to Pakistan and ended his life in poverty. Cashman quotes a Pakistani official that "during his last days, Wazir lived precariously on his own meagre savings in a small quarters in Soldiers Bazar where he struggled against poverty and disease".

His son Khalid Wazir played two Tests for Pakistan in 1954. Wazir was the elder brother of Nazir Ali.

== Cited sources ==
- Mihir Bose (1990) A History of Indian Cricket, Andre Deutsch, ISBN 0-233-98563-8
