= South Hobart/Sandy Bay Cricket Club =

Cricket Club based in Hobart, Tasmania

- Sport: Cricket
- Founded: 1987
- League: Cricket Tasmania Premier League
- Division: Mens 1st Grade, Mens 2nd Grade, Mens 3rd Grade, Under 18s
- Location: Sandy Bay
- Home ground: Queenborough Oval
- Colours: Mid Blue & Sky Blue
- President: Kristian Falconer
- Head coach: Richard Allanby
- Manager: Michael Farrell
- Secretary: Shannon Grubb
- Captain: Sam Voss (1st Grade), Joshua Brazendale (2nd Grade), Jack Baldwin (3rd Grade), Xavier Reynolds (U18)
- TCA Titles: South Hobart - 8; Sandy Bay - 3 SHSB - 2
- 2025/26: Wooden Spoon (1st Grade), Wodden Spoon(2nd Grade), 4th (3rd Grade), Runners Up(U16)
- Website: shsbsharks.com

South Hobart/Sandy Bay Cricket Club (SHSBCC), also known as "The Sharks", is a Grade level cricket club representing both South Hobart and Sandy Bay in Tasmania's Grade Cricket Competition. The club was formed by a merger of two previous clubs from each of these suburbs.

SHSBCC play their home games at Queenborough Oval, in Sandy Bay, Hobart.

South Hobart were very successful in the 1930s winning multiple premierships over the decade. Post war, both clubs had limited success at the 1st grade level with their last premierships coming in the 1979-80 & 1980/81 seasons. Ultimately, South Hobart and Sandy Bay amalgamated in August 1987 forming the South Hobart Sandy Bay Cricket Club.

After many unsuccessful attempts at winning the overall men's 1st grade premiership, the Sharks won in the 2015–16 season defeating Kingborough CC in the three day final. The Sharks then went back to back the next season in 2016-17 defeating North Hobart CC. Coincidentally, they also won the second grade premierships in both years also.

SHSBCC has been the home of current and former Australian players including ,George Bailey (cricketer, born 1982) Xavier Doherty, Ben Dunk and Alex Doolan, along with a host of recent Tasmanian and Hobart Hurricane contracted cricketers such as Sean Willis, Gabe Bell, Simon Milenko, Travis Birt, Matt Johnson, Hamish Kingston & Timm van der Gugten.

The clubs strong junior development has seen a host of young players represent Tasmania at a junior level. Over 80 juniors are currently playing for the club. Their junior program was awarded the Tasmania Junior Program of the Year Award in 2018–19 in the 'A Sport for All' awards.

== Honours ==
TCA Premierships

:
South Hobart (8) 1931–32,1935–36,1936–37,1937–38,1944–45,1958–59,1959–60,1979-80.
Sandy Bay (3) 1943–44,1945–46,1980-81.
South Hobart/Sandy Bay (2) 2015–16, 2016–17

== Current Squad (24/25) ==
Mens 1st Grade

- Samuel Voss
- Kayden Hine
- Cooper Stubbs
- Thomas Willoughby
- Joshua Brazendale
- Harry Nichols
- Archie banks-Smith
- Max Denehey
- Caedence Kuepper
- Jordan Cooper
- Blake Johannesen
- Caleb Oakes
- Charlie Fish
- Gabe Bell
- Edward Guilline
- Sean Willis
- Will Prestwidge

Mens 2nd Grade

- Reece Norris
- Cooper Stubbs
- Max Denehey
- Joshua Brazendale
- Samuel Young
- Darcy Andrikonis
- Joel Corbett
- Michael Flanagan
- James Turnbull
- George Seward
- Blake Johannesen
- Lachlan Johannesen
- James Turnbull
- Oscar Shinkfield
- James Weir
- Harry Opray
- Alec Kelly
- Hamish McCulloch
- Xavier Reynolds
- Lewis Spauding

Mens 3rd Grade

- Lachlan Johannesen
- Hugh Puchas
- Jack Baldwin
- Blake Johannesen
- Darcy Andrikonis
- Owen Brasher
- Robert Owen
- Lewis Spaulding
- hamish McCulloch
- Harry Jones
- Luke Grubb
- James Colhoun
- Joel Corbett
- Louie Williams
- Reuben Stott
- Oliver Brancher
- Ed Freeman
- Frederick Wiggins

Under 16 Boys

- Luke Grubb
- Hugo Slattery
- Reuben Stott
- Xavier Reynolds
- Louie Williams
- Samuel Spurr
- Hudson Stott
- Ed Freeman
- Angus Fish
- Frederick Wiggins
- Hudson Crowe
- Lars Bayer
- Angus Direen
- Josh Groom
- Charlie Johnson
