= Wendell Bill =

Australian cricketer (1910–1988

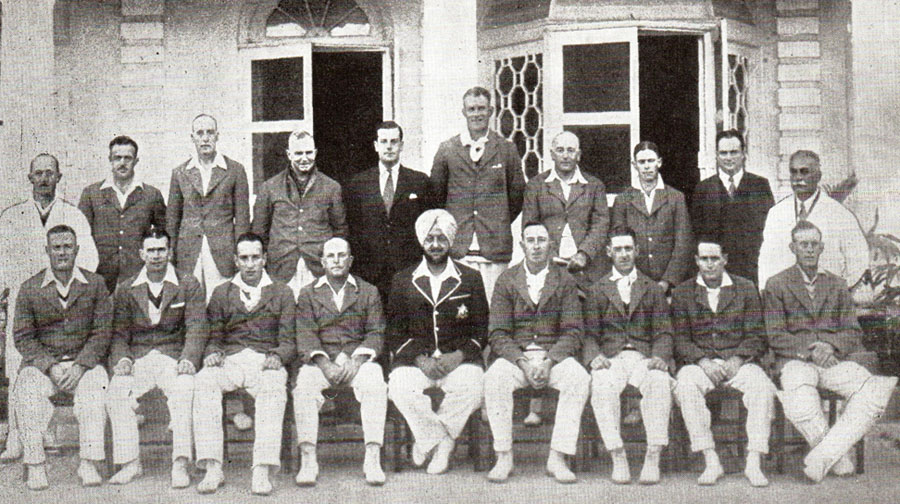
- The Australian cricket team in India, 1935-36. Wendell Bill is seated at the right end of the front row.

Personal information
- Full name: Oscar Wendell Bill
- Born: 8 April 1910; Waverley, Sydney, Australia
- Died: 10 May 1988 (aged 78); Sydney, Australia
- Batting: Right-handed
- Role: Opening batsman

Domestic team information
- Years: Team
- 1929/30–1935/36: New South Wales

Career statistics
Competition	First-class
Matches	35
Runs scored	1,931
Batting average	37.86
100s/50s	6/4
Top score	153
Catches/stumpings	20/–
- Source: Cricinfo, 22 December 2016

Oscar Wendell Bill (8 April 1910 – 10 May 1988) was an Australian cricketer. He played 35 first-class matches, mostly for New South Wales, between 1929–30 and 1935–36.

== Life and career ==
Bill was one of the children of George Thomas Bill, an English-born lecturer at the University of Sydney. Before he played first-class cricket, Bill was a substitute fielder for New South Wales in one of their matches against the touring MCC in 1928–29; he ended up fielding for most of the match as both sides lost players to injury.

An opening batsman, Bill made a century on his first-class debut against Tasmania in 1929–30. He made his highest score of 153 in 1930–31 against Queensland in the Sheffield Shield.

Bill toured India and Ceylon with the Australian team in 1935–36, scoring three centuries in the first-class matches, including 101 against Ceylon after Ceylon had been dismissed for 96. In the low-scoring unofficial Test at Calcutta he was the top-scorer on either side with 16 and 45 not out. He was one of the Australians' leading batsmen until the match against Patiala when, on 118, his jaw was broken by a delivery from the fast bowler Mohammad Nissar. It was Bill's last first-class match. He wrote a continuing account of the tour for the weekly Sydney Mail between November 1935 and March 1936.

In November 1931, Bill appeared with his New South Wales teammate Don Bradman for a Blackheath team against a team from Lithgow in a match to celebrate the laying of a new artificial pitch at Blackheath. At one point, in three eight-ball overs, Bradman scored 100 runs while Bill, at the other end, made two singles.

During World War II, Bill was in the Australian Army from May 1943 to March 1946, serving as a private in an anti-aircraft unit. He married Patricia Adams in Sydney in March 1946. He worked in Alan Kippax's sporting goods store in Sydney before becoming a partner in his own sporting goods store.
