= Frank Tarrant =

Australian cricketer (1880–1951)

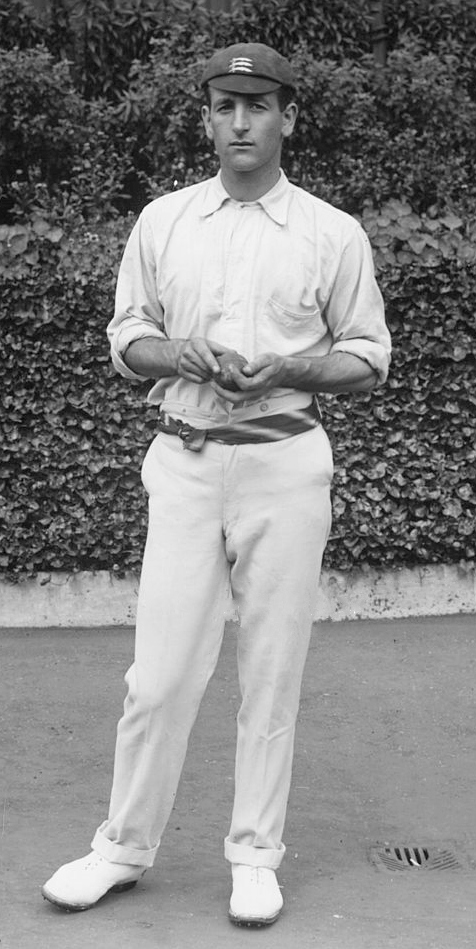
- Tarrant, c. 1905

Personal information
- Full name: Francis Alfred Tarrant
- Born: 11 December 1880; Fitzroy, Colony of Victoria
- Died: 29 January 1951 (aged 70); Hawthorn, Victoria, Australia
- Batting: Right-handed
- Bowling: Left-arm slow-medium
- Role: All-rounder
- Relatives: WA Tarrant (uncle); LBN Tarrant (son)

Domestic team information
- Years: Team
- 1899–1925: Victoria
- 1903–1914: MCC
- 1904–1914: Middlesex
- 1915–1936: Europeans
- 1927–1933: Patiala

Umpiring information
- Tests umpired: 2 (1933–1934)
- FC umpired: 8 (1932–1934)

Career statistics
| Competition | FC |
|---|---|
| Matches | 329 |
| Runs scored | 17,952 |
| Batting average | 36.41 |
| 100s/50s | 33/93 |
| Top score | 250* |
| Balls bowled | 63,531 |
| Wickets | 1,512 |
| Bowling average | 17.49 |
| 5 wickets in innings | 133 |
| 10 wickets in match | 38 |
| Best bowling | 10/90 |
| Catches/stumpings | 303/– |
- Source: CricketArchive, 11 January 2015

Francis Alfred Tarrant (11 December 1880 – 29 January 1951) was an Australian cricketer whose first-class career spanned from 1899 to 1936, and included 329 matches.

From Melbourne, Tarrant began his career with Victoria in Australia's Sheffield Shield, but found fame playing in England, with a long career as an all-rounder for Middlesex in the County Championship. After the First World War, he was mostly active in India, appearing for the Europeans in the Bombay Quadrangular tournament. Tarrant played his final first-class match at the age of 56, during the 1936–37 season. He had also umpired in two England–India Test matches (and several first-class games) several seasons earlier. Considered one of the best players never to play at Test level, Tarrant scored almost 18,000 runs and over 1,500 wickets during his long career, and completed "the double" of 1,000 runs and 100 wickets in a season on eight separate occasions.

== Biography ==
A nephew of ex-Victoria player Ambrose Tarrant, Tarrant first played for Victoria in 1898/1899, and met with little success either as a batsman or a bowler then or in 1900/1901.

However, he moved to England in 1903 to join the Lord's ground staff and played a number of matches for the MCC while qualifying for Middlesex. In these, he showed himself developing into a left-arm spinner of above average pace but with nothing beyond steadiness when pitches did not help him. In 1904, he showed development as a solid right-handed batsman, and in 1905, when fully qualified, he was a valuable aid to Middlesex. his superb batting on a difficult pitch to draw the game with Essex at Leyton showed he was a player of exceptional resolution during the most difficult crisis.

In 1906, while his bowling was impotent on the rock-hard wickets prevailing in the Home Counties for most of the season, Tarrant was unplayable on rain-affected pitches at Old Trafford and in Yorkshire, and he scored 1000 runs for the first time.

1907 saw Tarrant take a leap into cricket's elite, with his batting, at least for three months, marking him as a player of remarkable patience even if he failed to use all the strokes he was capable of playing. Though he lacked sting when pitches were hard, on rain-affected pitches Tarrant could turn the ball extremely quickly from a perfect length. This was seen at its clearest when he took nine for 59 against Nottinghamshire at Lord's – some of the batsmen said they "had never seen a finer piece of bowling". For the whole season Tarrant took 183 wickets for 15.70 each and scored 1552 runs with an average of 32.

That winter, Tarrant returned to Australia and in six matches scored 762 runs for an average of 76, including 159 against the touring MCC team and 206 against New South Wales at the SCG. Between 1908 and 1914, he was always one of the best all-rounders in the game – a safe catcher, a skilful opening batsman (who formed with Pelham Warner one of the best opening partnerships in the game), and a deadly bowler when the wicket was helpful and steady when it did not. His batting also grew beyond the purely defensive as he developed his on-side strokes – so much that against Surrey at Lord's in 1911 he scored 89 in seventy minutes when Middlesex wanted quick runs for a declaration. That year he achieved the rare feat of scoring 2000 runs and taking 100 wickets, and carried his bat for 207 against Yorkshire. His performance of taking 16 for 176 followed by 101 not out against Lancashire in 1914 remains one of the greatest all-round feats in county cricket. That same year, he scored a brilliant 250 not out at Leyton after Johnny Douglas had put Middlesex in to bat on a rain-affected pitch. As he scored 200 against Worcestershire in the following match, he accomplished the remarkable feat of scoring two successive double-hundreds. With J.W. Hearne he forged a partnership that, almost single-handed, allowed Middlesex to come second to Surrey.

During the war, Tarrant played in India, and his bowling was unplayable on the matting wickets against weak batting. In 1918/1919 he achieved the incredible feat of scoring a century and taking all ten wickets in an innings.

Tarrant continued to organise touring teams to India after the war, and only played rarely outside India. However, he managed to make 78 in one match as late as 1936/1937, when he was fifty-seven, and he umpired England's first two Tests on Indian soil, as well as several other MCC matches on that tour. Tarrant and his son Louis stood together in the match between MCC and Southern Punjab, which provides one of the few instances when a father and son umpired in a match, and later also appeared together in a first-class match during the 1935–36 season.

On 26 August 1909, playing for Middlesex against Gloucestershire, Tarrant did the double by taking a Hat-trick and carrying his bat in the same match; he is the only cricketer to do so.
