= List of Sukkur cricketers =

This is a list of cricketers who played first-class or List A matches for Sukkur cricket team in Pakistan. The team played several seasons in various first-class competitions, primarily the Patron's Trophy, from 1974/75 to 1978/79 and from 1983/84 to 1986/87, and two seasons in the List A President's Trophy, 1984/85 and 1985/86

- Abdul Hameed
- Abdul Jabbar
- Abdul Nabi
- Abdul Nabi Magsi
- Abid Khan
- Abid Raza
- Aftab Soomro
- Amjad Bhatti
- Anwar Zaidi
- Aqeel Ahmed
- Arif Amin
- Arshad Ali
- Asad Afridi
- Ashfaq Abbasi
- Ashiq Hussain
- Aslam Baig
- Aslam Jafri
- Aslam Manghi
- Aziz-ur-Rehman
- Burhanuddin
- Deedar Murtaza
- Ghulam Sabir
- Hafeez Ahmed
- Hanif Baloch
- Hasan Kazmi
- Hasan Mehdi
- Hilal Abbas
- Hussain Shah
- Imtiaz Ahmed
- Irshad Ali
- Israr Ahmed
- Jarrar Ahmed
- Javed Ali
- Khaleeq Pirzada
- Liaqat Hussain
- Manzoor Ahmed
- Maqsood Ahmed
- Mehdi Pirzada
- Mohammad Akram
- Mohammad Siddiq
- Mohammad Younus
- Mohsin Shah
- Mubashir Ali
- Mumtaz Ali
- Mushtaq Butt
- Naimatullah
- Nasim Ahmed
- Nasir Khan
- Nayyar Hussain
- Nazar Mohammad
- Pervez Rehman
- Rizwanullah
- Rizwan Yousuf
- Sadiq Ali
- Sajid Mohsin
- Samiullah Khan
- Sharif Kaka
- Siddiq Khan
- Tajammul Abbas
- Taj Mohammad
- Yousuf Bhatti
- Zafar Iqbal
