= Australia at the Men's T20 World Cup =

Australia national team performance at T20 World Cup

The Australia national cricket team is one of the full members of the International Cricket Council (ICC). The team has qualified for all the editions of the tournament and they won their first title in 2021. While they have been the runners-up in 2010, they had also reached the semifinals of the tournament in 2007 and 2012. In ten editions, the team has 32 wins in 52 matches.

== T20 World Cup record ==
Key
Champions
Runners-up
Semi-finals
Host

Year	Round	Position	Pld	W	L	T	NR	Ab (Note: Abandoned matches are not counted in the official records.)	Captain
(South Africa) 2007	Semi-finals	3/12	6	3	3	0	0	0	Ricky Ponting
(England) 2009	Group Stage	11/12	2	0	2	0	0	0	Ricky Ponting
(Cricket West Indies) 2010	Runners-up	2/12	7	6	1	0	0	0	Michael Clarke
(Sri Lanka) 2012	Semi-finals	3/12	6	4	2	0	0	0	George Bailey
(Bangladesh) 2014	Super 10	9/16	4	1	3	0	0	0	George Bailey
(India) 2016	Super 10	6/16	4	2	2	0	0	0	Steven Smith
(United Arab Emirates) (Oman) 2021	Champions	1/16	7	6	1	0	0	0	Aaron Finch
(Australia) 2022	Super 12	5/16	5	3	1	0	0	1	Aaron Finch
(Cricket West Indies) (United States) 2024	Super 8	6/20	7	5	2	0	0	0	Mitchell Marsh
(India) (Sri Lanka) 2026	Group Stage	10/20	4	2	2	0	0	0	Mitchell Marsh
(Australia) (New Zealand) 2028	Qualified as hosts								
Total	1 Title	10/10	52	32	19	0	0	1	—N/a

=== Teamwise record ===
Opponent	M	W	L	T	NR	Ab	Win %	First played
Afghanistan	2	1	1	0	0	0	50.00	2022
Bangladesh	6	6	0	0	0	0	100	2007
England	5	2	2	0	0	1	50.00	2007
India	6	2	4	0	0	0	33.33	2007
Ireland	3	3	0	0	0	0	100	2012
Namibia	1	1	0	0	0	0	100	2024
New Zealand	3	1	2	0	0	0	33.33	2016
Oman	2	2	0	0	0	0	100	2024
Pakistan	7	4	3	0	0	0	57.14	2007
South Africa	2	2	0	0	0	0	100	2012
Scotland	1	1	0	0	0	0	100	2024
Sri Lanka	6	4	2	0	0	0	66.67	2007
West Indies	6	3	3	0	0	0	50.00	2009
Zimbabwe	2	0	2	0	0	0	0.00	2007
Total	52	32	19	0	0	1	62.00	—
Source: Last Updated: 20 February 2026

== Tournament results ==
=== South Africa 2007 ===
Squad and kit

- Ricky Ponting (c)
- Adam Gilchrist (vc, wk)
- Nathan Bracken
- Stuart Clark
- Michael Clarke
- Brad Haddin
- Matthew Hayden
- Brad Hodge
- Michael Hussey
- Mitchell Johnson
- Brett Lee
- Andrew Symonds
- Shane Watson

2007 kit

Results

Event	Group stage			Super 8s				Semifinal	Final	Overall Result
Event	Opposition Result	Opposition Result	Rank	Opposition Result	Opposition Result	Opposition Result	Rank	Opposition Result	Opposition Result	Overall Result
2007	Zimbabwe; L by 5 wickets	England; W by 8 wickets	1	Bangladesh; W by 9 wickets	Pakistan; L by 6 wickets	Sri Lanka; W by 10 wickets	2	India; L by 15 runs	Did not advance	Semifinals
Source: ESPNcricinfo

Scorecards

Group stage (Group B)

12 September 2007
18:00
(scorecard)

Australia; 138/9 (20 overs)	v	Zimbabwe; 139/5 (19.5 overs)
Brad Hodge 35 (22); Elton Chigumbura 3/20 (3 overs)		Brendan Taylor 60* (45); Stuart Clark 2/22 (4 overs)

Zimbabwe won by 5 wickets
Newlands Cricket Ground, Cape Town
Umpires: Asad Rauf (Pak) and Tony Hill (NZ)
Player of the match: Brendan Taylor (Zim)

- Australia won the toss and elected to bat.

14 September 2007
14:00
(scorecard)

England; 135 (20 overs)	v	Australia; 136/2 (14.5 overs)
Andrew Flintoff 31 (19); Nathan Bracken 3/16 (4 overs)		Matthew Hayden 67* (43); Andrew Flintoff 1/25 (4 overs)

Australia won by 8 wickets
Newlands Cricket Ground, Cape Town
Umpires: Asad Rauf (Pak) and Ian Howell (SA)
Player of the match: Nathan Bracken (Aus)

- England won the toss and elected to bat.
- Australia qualified for the Super 8s as a result of this match.

Super 8 (Group F)

16 September 2007
14:00
(scorecard)

Bangladesh; 123/8 (20 overs)	v	Australia; 124/1 (13.5 overs)
Tamim Iqbal 32 (40); Brett Lee 3/27 (4 overs)		Matthew Hayden 73* (48)

Australia won by 9 wickets
Newlands Cricket Ground, Cape Town
Umpires: Asad Rauf (Pak) and Ian Howell (SA)
Player of the match: Brett Lee (Aus)

- Australia won the toss and elected to field.
- Brett Lee took the first ever hat-trick in a T20I match.

18 September 2007
14:00
(scorecard)

Australia; 164/7 (20 overs)	v	Pakistan; 165/4 (19.1 overs)
Michael Hussey 37 (25); Sohail Tanvir 3/31 (4 overs)		Misbah-ul-Haq 66* (42); Stuart Clark 3/27 (4 overs)

Pakistan won by 6 wickets
Wanderers Stadium, Johannesburg
Umpires: Mark Benson (Eng) and Nigel Llong (Eng)
Player of the match: Misbah-ul-Haq (Pak)

- Pakistan won the toss and elected to field.

20 September 2007
10:00
(scorecard)

Sri Lanka; 101 (19.3 overs)	v	Australia; 102/0 (10.2 overs)
Jehan Mubarak 28 (26); Stuart Clark 4/20 (4 overs)		Matthew Hayden 58* (38)

Australia won by 10 wickets
Newlands Cricket Ground, Cape Town
Umpires: Asad Rauf (Pak) and Ian Howell (SA)
Player of the match: Stuart Clark (Aus)

- Australia won the toss and elected to field.
- Australia qualified for the semi-finals as a result of this match.

Knockout stage

Semi-final 2
22 September 2007
18:00
Scorecard

India; 188/5 (20 overs)	v	Australia; 173/7 (20 overs)
Yuvraj Singh 70 (30); Mitchell Johnson 2/31 (4 overs)		Matthew Hayden 62 (47); S. Sreesanth 2/12 (4 overs)

India won by 15 runs
Kingsmead, Durban
Umpires: Mark Benson (Eng) and Asad Rauf (Pak)
Player of the match: Yuvraj Singh (Ind)

- India won the toss and elected to bat.

=== England 2009 ===
Squad and kit

- Ricky Ponting (c)
- Nathan Bracken
- Michael Clarke
- Brad Haddin (wk)
- Nathan Hauritz
- Ben Hilfenhaus
- James Hopes
- David Hussey
- Michael Hussey
- Mitchell Johnson
- Brett Lee
- Peter Siddle
- David Warner
- Shane Watson
- Cameron White

2009 kit

Results

Event	Group stage			Super 8s		Semifinal	Final	Overall Result
Event	Opposition Result	Opposition Result	Rank	Opposition Result	Rank	Opposition Result	Opposition Result	Overall Result
2009	West Indies; L by 7 wickets	Sri Lanka; L by 6 wickets	3	Did not advance				Group stage
Source: ESPNcricinfo

Scorecards

Group stage (Group C)

6 June 2009
14:00
Scorecard

Australia; 169/7 (20 overs)	v	West Indies; 172/3 (15.5 overs)
David Warner 63 (53); Dwayne Bravo 2/31 (4 overs)		Chris Gayle 88 (50); Mitchell Johnson 2/36 (3.5 overs)

West Indies won by 7 wickets
The Oval, London
Umpires: Aleem Dar (Pak) and Asad Rauf (Pak)
Player of the match: Chris Gayle (WI)

- Australia won the toss and elected to bat.

8 June 2009
17:30 (D/N)
Scorecard

Australia; 159/9 (20 overs)	v	Sri Lanka; 160/4 (19 overs)
Mitchell Johnson 28* (13); Ajantha Mendis 3/20 (4 overs)		Kumar Sangakkara 55* (42); Brett Lee 2/39 (4 overs)

Sri Lanka won by 6 wickets
Trent Bridge, Nottingham
Umpires: Billy Bowden (NZ) and Ian Gould (Eng)
Player of the match: Kumar Sangakkara (SL)

- Sri Lanka won the toss and elected to field.
- Australia were eliminated as a result of this match.

=== West Indies 2010 ===
Squad and kit

- Michael Clarke (c)
- Daniel Christian
- Brad Haddin (wk)
- Nathan Hauritz
- David Hussey
- Michael Hussey
- Mitchell Johnson
- Brett Lee
- Dirk Nannes
- Tim Paine (wk)
- Steve Smith
- Shaun Tait
- David Warner
- Shane Watson
- Cameron White

2010 kit

Results

Event	Group stage			Super 8s				Semifinal	Final	Overall Result
Event	Opposition Result	Opposition Result	Rank	Opposition Result	Opposition Result	Opposition Result	Rank	Opposition Result	Opposition Result	Overall Result
2010	Pakistan; W by 34 runs	Bangladesh; W by 27 runs	1	India; W by 49 runs	Sri Lanka; W by 81 runs	West Indies; W by 6 wickets	1	Pakistan; W by 3 wickets	England; L by 7 wickets	Runners-up
Source: ESPNcricinfo

Scorecards

Group stage (Group A)

2 May 2010
13:30
Scorecard

Australia; 191 (20 overs)	v	Pakistan; 157 (20 overs)
Shane Watson 81 (49); Mohammad Amir 3/23 (4 overs)		Misbah-ul-Haq 41 (31); Shaun Tait 3/20 (4 overs)

Australia won by 34 runs
Beausejour Stadium, Gros Islet
Umpires: Asoka de Silva (SL) and Shavir Tarapore (Ind)
Player of the match: Shane Watson (Aus)

- Australia won the toss and elected to bat.
- Five wickets fell in the final over of Australia's innings. Australia qualified for the Super 8s as a result of this match.

5 May 2010
13:00
Scorecard

Australia; 141/7 (20 overs)	v	Bangladesh; 114 (18.4 overs)
Michael Hussey 47* (29); Shakib Al Hasan 2/24 (4 overs)		Shakib Al Hasan 28 (28); Dirk Nannes 4/18 (4 overs)

Australia won by 27 runs
Kensington Oval, Bridgetown
Umpires: Aleem Dar (Pak) and Billy Doctrove (WI)
Player of the match: Michael Hussey (Aus)

- Australia won the toss and elected to bat.

Super 8 (Group F)

7 May 2010
09:30
Scorecard

Australia; 184/5 (20 overs)	v	India; 135 (17.4 overs)
David Warner 72 (42); Yuvraj Singh 2/20 (2 overs)		Rohit Sharma 79* (46); Shaun Tait 3/21 (3.4 overs)

Australia won by 49 runs
Kensington Oval, Bridgetown
Umpires: Billy Bowden (NZ) and Billy Doctrove (WI)
Player of the match: David Warner (Aus)

- India won the toss and elected to field.

9 May 2010
14:00
Scorecard

Australia; 168/5 (20 overs)	v	Sri Lanka; 87 (16.2 overs)
Cameron White 85* (49); Suraj Randiv 3/20 (4 overs)		Tillakaratne Dilshan 20 (12); Mitchell Johnson 3/15 (3.2 overs)

Australia won by 81 runs
Kensington Oval, Bridgetown
Umpires: Ian Gould (Eng) and Rudi Koertzen (SA)
Player of the match: Cameron White (Aus)

- Australia won the toss and elected to bat.

11 May 2010
17:00 (D/N)
Scorecard

West Indies; 105 (19 overs)	v	Australia; 109/4 (16.2 overs)
Ramnaresh Sarwan 26 (31); Steve Smith 3/20 (4 overs)		Brad Haddin 42 (46); Chris Gayle 1/5 (0.2 overs)

Australia won by 6 wickets
Beausejour Stadium, Gros Islet
Umpires: Billy Bowden (NZ) and Rudi Koertzen (SA)
Player of the match: Steve Smith (Aus)

- West Indies won the toss and elected to bat.
- Australia qualified for the semi-finals as a result of this match.

Knockout stage

Semi-final 2
14 May 2010
11:30
Scorecard

Pakistan; 191/6 (20 overs)	v	Australia; 197/7 (19.5 overs)
Umar Akmal 56* (35); Steve Smith 1/23 (2 overs)		Michael Hussey 60* (24); Mohammad Amir 3/35 (4 overs)

Australia won by 3 wickets
Beausejour Stadium, Gros Islet
Umpires: Billy Doctrove (WI) and Ian Gould (Eng)
Player of the match: Michael Hussey (Aus)

- Australia won the toss and elected to field.

Final
16 May 2010
11:30
Scorecard

Australia; 147/6 (20 overs)	v	England; 148/3 (17 overs)
David Hussey 59 (54); Ryan Sidebottom 2/26 (4 overs)		Craig Kieswetter 63 (49); Steve Smith 1/21 (3 overs)

England won by 7 wickets
Kensington Oval, Bridgetown
Umpires: Aleem Dar (Pak) and Billy Doctrove (WI)
Player of the match: Craig Kieswetter (Eng)

- England won the toss and elected to field.

=== Sri Lanka 2012 ===
Squad and kit

- George Bailey (c)
- Shane Watson (vc)
- Daniel Christian
- Pat Cummins
- Xavier Doherty
- Ben Hilfenhaus
- Brad Hogg
- David Hussey
- Michael Hussey
- Glenn Maxwell
- Clinton McKay
- Mitchell Starc
- Matthew Wade (wk)
- David Warner
- Cameron White

2012 kit

Results

Event	Group stage			Super 8s				Semifinal	Final	Overall Result
Event	Opposition Result	Opposition Result	Rank	Opposition Result	Opposition Result	Opposition Result	Rank	Opposition Result	Opposition Result	Overall Result
2012	Ireland; W by 7 wickets	West Indies; W by 17 runs	1	India; W by 9 wickets	South Africa; W by 8 wickets	Pakistan; L by 32 runs	1	West Indies; L by 74 runs	Did not advance	Semifinals
Source: ESPNcricinfo

Scorecards

Group stage (Group B)

19 September 2012
15:30 (D/N)
Scorecard

Ireland; 123/7 (20 overs)	v	Australia; 125/3 (15.1 overs)
Kevin O'Brien 35 (29); Shane Watson 3/26 (4 overs)		Shane Watson 51 (30); Kevin O'Brien 1/18 (3 overs)

Australia won by 7 wickets
R. Premadasa Stadium, Colombo
Umpires: Aleem Dar (Pak) and Kumar Dharmasena (SL)
Player of the match: Shane Watson (Aus)

- Ireland won the toss and elected to bat

22 September 2012
19:30 (D/N)
Scorecard

West Indies; 191/8 (20 overs)	v	Australia; 100/1 (9.1 overs)
Chris Gayle 54 (33); Mitchell Starc 3/35 (4 overs)		Shane Watson 41* (24); Fidel Edwards 1/16 (2 overs)

Australia won by 17 runs (D/L method)
R. Premadasa Stadium, Colombo
Umpires: Aleem Dar (Pak) and Asad Rauf (Pak)
Player of the match: Shane Watson (Aus)

- West Indies won the toss and elected to bat
- Match abandoned after 9.1 overs due to rain
- D/L par score at 9.1 overs with one wicket lost was 83, hence the winning margin was 17 runs
- Australia qualified for the Super Eights as a result of this match

Super 8 (Group F)

28 September 2012
19:30 (D/N)
Scorecard

India; 140/7 (20 overs)	v	Australia; 141/1 (14.4 overs)
Irfan Pathan 31 (30); Shane Watson 3/34 (4 overs)		Shane Watson 72 (42); Yuvraj Singh 1/16 (2 overs)

Australia won by 9 wickets
R. Premadasa Stadium, Colombo
Umpires: Kumar Dharmasena (SL) and Richard Kettleborough (Eng)
Player of the match: Shane Watson (Aus)

- India won the toss and elected to bat

30 September 2012
15:30 (D/N)
Scorecard

South Africa; 146/5 (20 overs)	v	Australia; 147/2 (17.4 overs)
Robin Peterson 32* (19); Xavier Doherty 3/20 (4 overs)		Shane Watson 70 (47); Morne Morkel 1/23 (3 overs)

Australia won by 8 wickets
R. Premadasa Stadium, Colombo
Umpires: Kumar Dharmasena (SL) and Ian Gould (Eng)
Player of the match: Shane Watson (Aus)

- Australia won the toss and elected to field

2 October 2012
15:30 (D/N)
Scorecard

Pakistan; 149/6 (20 overs)	v	Australia; 117/7 (20 overs)
Nasir Jamshed 55 (46); Mitchell Starc 3/20 (4 overs)		Michael Hussey 54* (47); Saeed Ajmal 3/17 (4 overs)

Pakistan won by 32 runs
R. Premadasa Stadium, Colombo
Umpires: Ian Gould (Eng) and Richard Kettleborough (Eng)
Player of the match: Raza Hasan (Pak)

- Australia won the toss and elected to field
- Australia qualified for the semi-finals by virtue of a superior Net run rate.

Knockout stage

Semi-final 2
5 October 2012
19:00 (D/N)
Scorecard

West Indies; 205/4 (20 overs)	v	Australia; 131 (16.4 overs)
Chris Gayle 75* (41); Pat Cummins 2/36 (4 overs)		George Bailey 63 (29); Ravi Rampaul 3/16 (3.4 overs)

West Indies won by 74 runs
R. Premadasa Stadium, Colombo
Attendance : 22,345
Umpires: Aleem Dar (Pak) and Kumar Dharmasena (Sri)
Player of the match: Chris Gayle (WI)

- West Indies won the toss and elected to bat

=== Bangladesh 2014 ===
Squad and kit

- George Bailey (c)
- Doug Bollinger
- Daniel Christian
- Nathan Coulter-Nile
- James Faulkner
- Aaron Finch
- Brad Haddin (wk)
- Brad Hodge
- Brad Hogg
- Glenn Maxwell
- James Muirhead
- Mitchell Starc
- David Warner
- Shane Watson
- Cameron White

2014 kit

Results

Event	Super 10					Semifinal	Final	Overall Result
Event	Opposition Result	Opposition Result	Opposition Result	Opposition Result	Rank	Opposition Result	Opposition Result	Overall Result
2014	Pakistan; L by 16 runs	West Indies; L by 6 wickets	India; L by 73 runs	Bangladesh; W by 7 wickets	4	Did not advance		Super 10
Source: ESPNcricinfo

Scorecards

Super 10 (Group 2)

23 March 2014
15:30
Scorecard

Pakistan; 191/5 (20 overs)	v	Australia; 175 (20 overs)
Umar Akmal 94 (54); Nathan Coulter-Nile 2/36(4 overs)		Glenn Maxwell 74 (33); Zulfiqar Babar 2/26 (4 overs)

Pakistan won by 16 runs
Sher-e-Bangla National Cricket Stadium, Dhaka
Umpires: Richard Kettleborough (Eng) and Nigel Llong (Eng)
Player of the match: Umar Akmal (Pak)

- Australia won the toss and elected to field.
- Glenn Maxwell scored the 3rd-fastest half century in Twenty20 Internationals.

28 March 2014
15:30
Scorecard

Australia; 178/8 (20 overs)	v	West Indies; 179/4 (19.4 overs)
Glenn Maxwell 45 (22); Sunil Narine 2/19 (4 overs)		Chris Gayle 53 (35); Mitchell Starc 2/50 (4 overs)

West Indies won by 6 wickets
Sher-e-Bangla National Cricket Stadium, Dhaka
Umpires: Marais Erasmus (RSA) and Ian Gould (Eng)
Player of the match: Darren Sammy (WI)

- Australia won the toss and elected to bat

30 March 2014
19:30 (D/N)
Scorecard

India; 159/7 (20 overs)	v	Australia; 86 (16.2 overs)
Yuvraj Singh 60 (43); Glenn Maxwell 1/20 (4 overs)		Glenn Maxwell 23 (12); Ravichandran Ashwin 4/11 (3.2 overs)

India won by 73 runs
Sher-e-Bangla National Cricket Stadium, Dhaka
Umpires: Kumar Dharmasena (SL) and Marais Erasmus (RSA)
Player of the match: Ravichandran Ashwin (Ind)

- Australia won the toss and elected to field

1 April 2014
15:30
Scorecard

Bangladesh; 153/5 (20 overs)	v	Australia; 158/3 (17.3 overs)
Shakib Al Hasan 66 (52); Nathan Coulter-Nile 2/17 (3 overs)		Aaron Finch 71 (45); Al-Amin Hossain 2/30 (3.3 overs)

Australia won by 7 wickets
Sher-e-Bangla National Cricket Stadium, Dhaka
Umpires: Kumar Dharmasena (SL) and Marais Erasmus (RSA)
Player of the match: Aaron Finch (Aus)

- Bangladesh won the toss and elected to bat

=== India 2016 ===
Squad and kit

- Steve Smith (c)
- David Warner (vc)
- Shane Watson
- Ashton Agar
- Nathan Coulter-Nile
- James Faulkner
- Aaron Finch
- John Hastings
- Josh Hazlewood
- Usman Khawaja
- Mitchell Marsh
- Glenn Maxwell
- Peter Nevill (wk)
- Andrew Tye
- Adam Zampa

2016 kit

Results

Event	Super 10					Semifinal	Final	Overall Result
Event	Opposition Result	Opposition Result	Opposition Result	Opposition Result	Rank	Opposition Result	Opposition Result	Overall Result
2016	New Zealand; L by 8 runs	Bangladesh; W by 3 wickets	Pakistan; W by 21 runs	India; L by 6 wickets	3	Did not advance		Super 10
Source: ESPNcricinfo

Scorecards

Super 10 (Group 2)

18 March 2016
15:00 (D/N)
Scorecard

New Zealand; 142/8 (20 overs)	v	Australia; 134/9 (20 overs)
Martin Guptill 39 (27); James Faulkner 2/18 (3 overs); Glenn Maxwell 2/18 (3 overs)		Usman Khawaja 38 (27); Mitchell McClenaghan 3/17 (3 overs)

New Zealand won by 8 runs
Himachal Pradesh Cricket Association Stadium, Dharamshala
Umpires: Marais Erasmus (SA) and Nigel Llong (Eng)
Player of the match: Mitchell McClenaghan (NZ)

- New Zealand won the toss and elected to bat.

21 March 2016
19:30 (D/N)
Scorecard

Bangladesh; 156/5 (20 overs)	v	Australia; 157/7 (18.3 overs)
Mahmudullah 49* (29); Adam Zampa 3/23 (4 overs)		Usman Khawaja 58 (45); Shakib Al Hasan 3/27 (4 overs)

Australia won by 3 wickets
M. Chinnaswamy Stadium, Bengaluru
Umpires: Ian Gould (Eng) and Richard Kettleborough (Eng)
Player of the match: Adam Zampa (Aus)

- Australia won the toss and elected to field.
- David Warner (Aus) became the fourth player to score more than 6,000 runs in T20 cricket.

25 March 2016
15:00 (D/N)
Scorecard

Australia; 193/4 (20 overs)	v	Pakistan; 172/8 (20 overs)
Steve Smith 61* (43); Imad Wasim 2/31 (4 overs)		Khalid Latif 46 (41); James Faulkner 5/28 (4 overs)

Australia won by 21 runs
I. S. Bindra Stadium, Mohali
Umpires: Kumar Dharmasena (SL) and Marais Erasmus (SA)
Player of the match: James Faulkner (Aus)

- Australia won the toss and elected to bat.
- James Faulkner became the first bowler for Australia and 15th player overall to take a five-wicket haul in a T20I match.

27 March 2016
19:30 (D/N)
Scorecard

Australia; 160/6 (20 overs)	v	India; 161/4 (19.1 overs)
Aaron Finch 43 (34); Hardik Pandya 2/36 (4 overs)		Virat Kohli 82* (51); Shane Watson 2/23 (4 overs)

India won by 6 wickets
I. S. Bindra Stadium, Mohali
Umpires: Kumar Dharmasena (SL) and Marais Erasmus (SA)
Player of the match: Virat Kohli (Ind)

- Australia won the toss and elected to bat.
- India qualified for the semi-finals as a result of this match, while Australia were eliminated.
- Shane Watson (Aus) played in his last international match.

=== Oman & UAE 2021 ===
Squad and kit

- Aaron Finch (c)
- Pat Cummins (vc)
- Ashton Agar
- Josh Hazlewood
- Josh Inglis (wk)
- Mitchell Marsh
- Glenn Maxwell
- Kane Richardson
- Steve Smith
- Mitchell Starc
- Marcus Stoinis
- Mitchell Swepson
- Matthew Wade (wk)
- David Warner
- Adam Zampa

2021 kit

Second kit

Results

Event	Super 12						Semifinal	Final	Overall Result
Event	Opposition Result	Opposition Result	Opposition Result	Opposition Result	Opposition Result	Rank	Opposition Result	Opposition Result	Overall Result
2021	South Africa; W by 5 wickets	Sri Lanka; W by 7 wickets	England; L by 8 wickets	Bangladesh; W by 8 wickets	West Indies; W by 8 wickets	2	Pakistan; W by 5 wickets	New Zealand; W by 8 wickets	Winners
Source: ESPNcricinfo

Scorecards

Super 12 (Group 1)

23 October 2021
14:00
Scorecard

South Africa; 118/9 (20 overs)	v	Australia; 121/5 (19.4 overs)
Aiden Markram 40 (36); Josh Hazlewood 2/19 (4 overs)		Steve Smith 35 (34); Anrich Nortje 2/21 (4 overs)

Australia won by 5 wickets
Sheikh Zayed Cricket Stadium, Abu Dhabi
Umpires: Michael Gough (Eng) and Nitin Menon (Ind)
Player of the match: Josh Hazlewood (Aus)

- Australia won the toss and elected to field.

28 October 2021
18:00 (N)
Scorecard

Sri Lanka; 154/6 (20 overs)	v	Australia; 155/3 (17 overs)
Kusal Perera 35 (25); Adam Zampa 2/12 (4 overs)		David Warner 65 (42); Wanindu Hasaranga 2/22 (4 overs)

Australia won by 7 wickets
Dubai International Cricket Stadium, Dubai
Umpires: Aleem Dar (Pak) and Richard Illingworth (Eng)
Player of the match: Adam Zampa (Aus)

- Australia won the toss and elected to field.

30 October 2021
18:00 (N)
Scorecard

Australia; 125 (20 overs)	v	England; 126/2 (11.4 overs)
Aaron Finch 44 (49); Chris Jordan 3/17 (4 overs)		Jos Buttler 71* (32); Ashton Agar 1/15 (2.4 overs)

England won by 8 wickets
Dubai International Cricket Stadium, Dubai
Umpires: Marais Erasmus (SA) and Nitin Menon (Ind)
Player of the match: Chris Jordan (Eng)

- England won the toss and elected to field.

4 November 2021
14:00
Scorecard

Bangladesh; 73 (15 overs)	v	Australia; 78/2 (6.2 overs)
Shamim Hossain 19 (18); Adam Zampa 5/19 (4 overs)		Aaron Finch 40 (20); Shoriful Islam 1/9 (1 over)

Australia won by 8 wickets
Dubai International Cricket Stadium, Dubai
Umpires: Kumar Dharmasena (SL) and Nitin Menon (Ind)
Player of the match: Adam Zampa (Aus)

- Australia won the toss and elected to field.
- Adam Zampa (Aus) took his first five-wicket haul in T20Is.

6 November 2021
14:00
Scorecard

West Indies; 157/7 (20 overs)	v	Australia; 161/2 (16.2 overs)
Kieron Pollard 44 (31); Josh Hazlewood 4/39 (4 overs)		David Warner 89* (56); Chris Gayle 1/7 (1 over)

Australia won by 8 wickets
Sheikh Zayed Cricket Stadium, Abu Dhabi
Umpires: Richard Illingworth (Eng) and Langton Rusere (Zim)
Player of the match: David Warner (Aus)

- Australia won the toss and elected to field.

Knockout stage

Semi-final 2
11 November 2021
18:00 (N)
Scorecard

Pakistan; 176/4 (20 overs)	v	Australia; 177/5 (19 overs)
Mohammad Rizwan 67 (52); Mitchell Starc 2/38 (4 overs)		David Warner 49 (30); Shadab Khan 4/26 (4 overs)

Australia won by 5 wickets
Dubai International Cricket Stadium, Dubai
Umpires: Chris Gaffaney (NZ) and Richard Kettleborough (Eng)
Player of the match: Matthew Wade (Aus)

- Australia won the toss and elected to field.

Final
14 November 2021
18:00 (N)
Scorecard

New Zealand; 172/4 (20 overs)	v	Australia; 173/2 (18.5 overs)
Kane Williamson 85 (48); Josh Hazlewood 3/16 (4 overs)		Mitchell Marsh 77* (50); Trent Boult 2/18 (4 overs)

Australia won by 8 wickets
Dubai International Cricket Stadium, Dubai
Umpires: Marais Erasmus (SA) and Richard Kettleborough (Eng)
Player of the match: Mitchell Marsh (Aus)

- Australia won the toss and elected to field.
- Australia won their maiden T20 World Cup title.

=== Australia 2022 ===
Squad and kit

- Aaron Finch (c)
- Pat Cummins (vc)
- Ashton Agar
- Tim David
- Cameron Green
- Josh Hazlewood
- Mitchell Marsh
- Glenn Maxwell
- Kane Richardson
- Steve Smith
- Mitchell Starc
- Marcus Stoinis
- Matthew Wade (wk)
- David Warner
- Adam Zampa

2022 kit

Results

Event	Super 12						Semifinal	Final	Overall Result
Event	Opposition Result	Opposition Result	Opposition Result	Opposition Result	Opposition Result	Rank	Opposition Result	Opposition Result	Overall Result
2022	New Zealand; L by 89 runs	Sri Lanka; W by 7 wickets	England; Match abandoned	Ireland; W by 42 runs	Afghanistan; W by 4 runs	3	Did not advance		Super 12
Source: ESPNcricinfo

Scorecards

Super 12 (Group 1)

22 October 2022
18:00 (N)
Scorecard

New Zealand; 200/3 (20 overs)	v	Australia; 111 (17.1 overs)
Devon Conway 92* (58); Josh Hazlewood 2/41 (4 overs)		Glenn Maxwell 28 (20); Tim Southee 3/6 (2.1 overs)

New Zealand won by 89 runs
Sydney Cricket Ground, Sydney
Umpires: Kumar Dharmasena (SL) and Adrian Holdstock (SA)
Player of the match: Devon Conway (NZ)

- Australia won the toss and elected to field.

25 October 2022
19:00 (N)
Scorecard

Sri Lanka; 157/6 (20 overs)	v	Australia; 158/3 (16.3 overs)
Pathum Nissanka 40 (45); Glenn Maxwell 1/5 (1 over)		Marcus Stoinis 59* (18); Dhananjaya de Silva 1/18 (2.1 overs)

Australia won by 7 wickets
Perth Stadium, Perth
Umpires: Marais Erasmus (SA) and Richard Illingworth (Eng)
Player of the match: Marcus Stoinis (Aus)

- Australia won the toss and elected to field.
- Marcus Stoinis scored the fastest half-century for Australia in T20Is from 17 balls.

28 October 2022
19:00 (N)
Scorecard

Australia	v	England

Match abandoned
Melbourne Cricket Ground, Melbourne
Umpires: Chris Brown (NZ) and Joel Wilson (WI)

- No toss.
- No play was possible due to rain.

31 October 2022
18:00 (N)
Scorecard

Australia; 179/5 (20 overs)	v	Ireland; 137 (18.1 overs)
Aaron Finch 63 (44); Barry McCarthy 3/29 (4 overs)		Lorcan Tucker 71* (48); Glenn Maxwell 2/14 (2.1 overs)

Australia won by 42 runs
The Gabba, Brisbane
Umpires: Chris Gaffaney (NZ) and Nitin Menon (Ind)
Player of the match: Aaron Finch (Aus)

- Ireland won the toss and elected to field.

4 November 2022
18:30 (N)
Scorecard

Australia; 168/8 (20 overs)	v	Afghanistan; 164/7 (20 overs)
Glenn Maxwell 54* (32); Naveen-ul-Haq 3/21 (4 overs)		Rashid Khan 48* (23); Adam Zampa 2/22 (4 overs)

Australia won by 4 runs
Adelaide Oval, Adelaide
Umpires: Aleem Dar (Pak) and Langton Rusere (Zim)
Player of the match: Glenn Maxwell (Aus)

- Afghanistan won the toss and elected to field.

=== United States & West Indies 2024 ===
Squad and kit

- Mitchell Marsh (c)
- Ashton Agar
- Pat Cummins
- Tim David
- Nathan Ellis
- Cameron Green
- Josh Hazlewood
- Travis Head
- Josh Inglis (wk)
- Glenn Maxwell
- Mitchell Starc
- Marcus Stoinis
- Matthew Wade (wk)
- David Warner
- Adam Zampa

2024 kit

Results

Event	Group stage (Group B)					Super 8 (Group 1)				Semifinal	Final	Overall Result
Event	Opposition Result	Opposition Result	Opposition Result	Opposition Result	Rank	Opposition Result	Opposition Result	Opposition Result	Rank	Opposition Result	Opposition Result	Overall Result
2024	Oman; W by 39 runs	England; W by 36 runs	Namibia; W by 9 wickets	Scotland; W by 5 wickets	1	Bangladesh; W by 28 runs	Afghanistan; L by 21 runs	India; L by 24 runs	3	Did not advance		Super 8
Source: ESPNcricinfo

Scorecards

Group stage (Group B)

5 June 2024
20:30 UTC−4 (N)
Scorecard

Australia; 164/5 (20 overs)	v	Oman; 125/9 (20 overs)
Marcus Stoinis 67* (36); Mehran Khan 2/38 (4 overs)		Ayaan Khan 36 (30); Marcus Stoinis 3/19 (3 overs)

Australia won by 39 runs
Kensington Oval, Bridgetown
Umpires: Joel Wilson (WI) and Asif Yaqoob (Pak)
Player of the match: Marcus Stoinis (Aus)

- Oman won the toss and elected to field.
- David Warner became the leading run-scorer for Australia in T20Is, passing the previous record of 3,120 runs set by Aaron Finch.

8 June 2024
13:00 UTC−4
Scorecard

Australia; 201/7 (20 overs)	v	England; 165/6 (20 overs)
David Warner 39 (16); Chris Jordan 2/44 (4 overs)		Jos Buttler 42 (28); Pat Cummins 2/23 (4 overs)

Australia won by 36 runs
Kensington Oval, Bridgetown
Umpires: Nitin Menon (Ind) and Joel Wilson (WI)
Player of the match: Adam Zampa (Aus)

- England won the toss and elected to field.

11 June 2024
20:30 UTC−4 (N)
Scorecard

Namibia; 72 (17 overs)	v	Australia; 74/1 (5.4 overs)
Gerhard Erasmus 36 (43); Adam Zampa 4/12 (4 overs)		Travis Head 34* (17); David Wiese 1/15 (1 over)

Australia won by 9 wickets
Sir Vivian Richards Stadium, North Sound
Umpires: Nitin Menon (Ind) and Rashid Riaz (Pak)
Player of the match: Adam Zampa (Aus)

- Australia won the toss and elected to field.
- Adam Zampa (Aus) became the first Australian cricketer to take 100 wickets in T20Is.
- Australia qualified for the Super 8 as a result of this match.

Match 35
15 June 2024
20:30 UTC−4 (N)
Scorecard

Scotland; 180/5 (20 overs)	v	Australia; 186/5 (19.4 overs)
Brandon McMullen 60 (34); Glenn Maxwell 2/44 (4 overs)		Travis Head 68 (49); Mark Watt 2/34 (4 overs)

Australia won by 5 wickets
Daren Sammy Cricket Ground, Gros Islet
Umpires: Michael Gough (Eng) and Asif Yaqoob (Pak)
Player of the match: Marcus Stoinis (Aus)

- Australia won the toss and elected to field.

Super 8 (Group 1)

20 June 2024
20:30 UTC−4 (N)
Scorecard

Bangladesh; 140/8 (20 overs)	v	Australia; 100/2 (11.2 overs)
Najmul Hossain Shanto 41 (36); Pat Cummins 3/29 (4 overs)		David Warner 53* (35); Rishad Hossain 2/23 (3 overs)

Australia won by 28 runs (DLS method)
Sir Vivian Richards Stadium, North Sound
Umpires: Michael Gough (Eng) and Richard Illingworth (Eng)
Player of the match: Pat Cummins (Aus)

- Australia won the toss and elected to field.
- Rain prevented any further play.
- Australia were above the DLS par score of 72 in 11.2 overs.
- Pat Cummins (Aus) took his first hat-trick in T20Is. This was the first hat-trick in the 2024 tournament and overall the seventh in the history of the T20 World Cup.

22 June 2024
20:30 UTC−4 (N)
Scorecard

Afghanistan; 148/6 (20 overs)	v	Australia; 127 (19.2 overs)
Rahmanullah Gurbaz 60 (49); Pat Cummins 3/28 (4 overs)		Glenn Maxwell 59 (41); Gulbadin Naib 4/20 (4 overs)

Afghanistan won by 21 runs
Arnos Vale Stadium, Kingstown
Umpires: Kumar Dharmasena (SL) and Ahsan Raza (Pak)
Player of the match: Gulbadin Naib (Afg)

- Australia won the toss and elected to field.
- Pat Cummins (Aus) took his second consecutive hat-trick in T20Is and became the only player to take more than one hat-trick in the T20 World Cup. This was the second hat-trick of the tournament and overall the eighth in the history of the T20 World Cup.

24 June 2024
10:30 UTC−4
Scorecard

India; 205/5 (20 overs)	v	Australia; 181/7 (20 overs)
Rohit Sharma 92 (41); Mitchell Starc 2/45 (4 overs)		Travis Head 76 (43); Arshdeep Singh 3/37 (4 overs)

India won by 24 runs
Daren Sammy Cricket Ground, Gros Islet
Umpires: Richard Illingworth (Eng) and Richard Kettleborough (Eng)
Player of the match: Rohit Sharma (Ind)

- Australia won the toss and elected to field.

=== India & Sri Lanka 2026 ===
Squad and kit

- Mitchell Marsh (c)
- Ben Dwarshuis
- Tim David
- Nathan Ellis
- Cameron Green
- Josh Hazlewood
- Travis Head
- Josh Inglis (wk)
- Matthew Kuhnemann
- Glenn Maxwell
- Matt Renshaw
- Mitchell Starc
- Marcus Stoinis
- Xavier Bartlett
- Adam Zampa

Reserve players:

- Sean Abbott
- Note: Ben Dwarshuis and Matt Renshaw replaced Pat Cummins and Matthew Short

2026 kit

Results

Group stage (Group B)					Super 8		Semifinal	Final	Overall Result
Opposition Result	Opposition Result	Opposition Result	Opposition Result	Rank	Opposition Result	Rank	Opposition Result	Opposition Result	Overall Result
Ireland; W by 67 runs	Zimbabwe; L by 23 runs	Sri Lanka; L by 8 wickets	Oman; W by 9 wickets	3	Did not advance				Group stage
Source: ESPNcricinfo

Scorecards

Group stage (Group B)

Match 14
11 February 2026
15:00 UTC+5:30 (D/N)
Scorecard

Australia; 182/6 (20 overs)	v	Ireland; 115 (16.5 overs)
Marcus Stoinis 45 (29); Mark Adair 2/44 (4 overs)		George Dockrell 41 (29); Nathan Ellis 4/12 (3.5 overs)

Australia won by 67 runs
R. Premadasa Stadium, Colombo
Umpires: Chris Gaffaney (NZ) and Richard Illingworth (Eng)
Player of the match: Nathan Ellis (Aus)

- Australia won the toss and elected to bat.

Match 19
13 February 2026
11:00 UTC+5:30
Scorecard

Zimbabwe; 169/2 (20 overs)	v	Australia; 146 (19.3 overs)
Brian Bennett 64* (56); Cameron Green 1/6 (1.1 overs)		Matt Renshaw 65 (44); Blessing Muzarabani 4/17 (4 overs)

Zimbabwe won by 23 runs
R. Premadasa Stadium, Colombo
Umpires: Chris Gaffaney (NZ) and Raveendra Wimalasiri (SL)
Player of the match: Blessing Muzarabani (Zim)

- Australia won the toss and elected to field.
- Blessing Muzarabani became the third player for Zimbabwe to take 100 wickets in T20Is.

Match 30
16 February 2026
19:00 UTC+5:30 (N)
Scorecard

Australia; 181 (20 overs)	v	Sri Lanka; 184/2 (18 overs)
Travis Head 56 (29); Dushan Hemantha 3/37 (4 overs)		Pathum Nissanka 100* (52); Marcus Stoinis 2/46 (4 overs)

Sri Lanka won by 8 wickets
Pallekele International Cricket Stadium, Kandy
Umpires: Richard Kettleborough (Eng) and Ahsan Raza (Pak)
Player of the match: Pathum Nissanka (SL)

- Sri Lanka won the toss and elected to field.
- Pathum Nissanka became the second player from Sri Lanka to score a century in T20 World Cup and the second Sri Lankan to score 2,500 T20I runs. This was the first century in the 2026 tournament and 12th overall in the T20 World Cup history.
- This was the highest successful run chase by Sri Lanka in T20 World Cups.
- Sri Lanka qualified for the Super 8 as a result of this match.

Match 40
20 February 2026
19:00 UTC+5:30 (N)
Scorecard

Oman; 104 (16.2 overs)	v	Australia; 108/1 (9.4 overs)
Wasim Ali 32 (33); Adam Zampa 4/21 (3.2 overs)		Mitchell Marsh 64* (33); Shakeel Ahmed 1/29 (4 overs)

Australia won by 9 wickets
Pallekele International Cricket Stadium, Kandy
Umpires: Kumar Dharmasena (SL) and Chris Gaffaney (NZ)
Player of the match: Adam Zampa (Aus)

- Australia won the toss and elected to field.
- Glenn Maxwell (Aus) took his 50th wicket in T20Is. This was also the last T20I for Maxwell before his retirement from international cricket.

== See also ==
- Australia at the Cricket World Cup
- ICC Men's T20 World Cup
