= Australia at the Cricket World Cup =

The Australian cricket team is the most successful team in the Cricket World Cup winning the 1987, 1999, 2003, 2007, 2015, and 2023 editions. This also makes them the only team to have won the world cup in all the regions (group of countries) that have hosted the world cup till now. Australia also reached the finals of the 1975 and 1996 World Cups, losing to West Indies and Sri Lanka, respectively. They also reached the semifinals of the 2019 and the quarterfinals of the 2011 World Cups, losing to England and India, respectively. They were knocked out in the first round three times, in the 1979, 1983 and 1992 editions. The team has played a total 107 world cup matches, the highest of any team. Its overall win–loss record is 79–26 (which gives it the highest winning percentage among all teams playing the World Cup), with one tied match and two being abandoned due to rain.

== Cricket World Cup Record ==
Cricket World Cup record							Qualification record				
Year	Round	Games	Won	Lost	Tied/No result	Captain	Pld	W	L	T	NR
(England) 1975	Runners-Up	5	3	2	0	Ian Chappell	No qualifiers				
(England) 1979	Group Stage	3	1	2	0	Kim Hughes	Did not participate (qualified automatically as a full member)				
(England) (Wales) 1983	Group Stage	6	2	4	0	Kim Hughes	Did not participate (qualified automatically as a full member)				
(India) (Pakistan) 1987	Champions	8	7	1	0	Allan Border	Did not participate (qualified automatically as a full member)				
(Australia) (New Zealand) 1992^{$}	Round Robin stage	8	4	4	0	Allan Border	Did not participate (qualified automatically as a full member)				
(India) (Pakistan) (Sri Lanka) 1996	Runners-Up	8	5	3	0	Mark Taylor	Did not participate (qualified automatically as a full member)				
(England) (Wales) (Scotland) (Republic of Ireland) (Netherlands) 1999	Champions	10	7	2	1	Steve Waugh	Did not participate (qualified automatically as a full member)				
(South Africa) (Zimbabwe) (Kenya) 2003	Champions	11	11	0	0	Ricky Ponting	Did not participate (qualified automatically as a full member)				
(Cricket West Indies) 2007	Champions	11	11	0	0	Ricky Ponting	Did not participate (qualified automatically as a full member)				
(India) (Bangladesh) (Sri Lanka) 2011	Quarter-Finals	7	4	2	1	Ricky Ponting	Did not participate (qualified automatically as a full member)				
(Australia) (New Zealand) 2015^{$}	Champions	9	7	1	1	Michael Clarke	Did not participate (qualified automatically as a full member)				
(England) (Wales) 2019	Semi-Finals	10	7	3	0	Aaron Finch	Did not participate (qualified automatically as a full member)				
(India) 2023	Champions	11	9	2	0	Pat Cummins	24	15	9	0	0
Total	6 Titles	107	78	26	3	–	24	15	9	0	0

^{$}Red box indicates that the tournament was hosted or co-hosted by Australia

== By opposition ==
Result by opponent
Opponent	Matches	Won	Lost	Tied	No Result	Win %	First played
Afghanistan	3	3	0	0	0	100	4 March 2015
Bangladesh	5	4	0	0	1	75	27 May 1999
Canada	2	2	0	0	0	100	16 June 1979
England	9	6	3	0	0	62.50	18 June 1975
India	15	9	6	0	0	61.53	13 June 1983
Ireland	1	1	0	0	0	100	13 April 2007
Kenya	3	3	0	0	0	100	23 February 1996
Namibia	1	1	0	0	0	100	27 February 2003
Netherlands	3	3	0	0	0	100	20 February 2003
New Zealand	12	9	3	0	0	72.72	18 October 1987
Pakistan	11	7	4	0	0	60	7 June 1975
Scotland	2	2	0	0	0	100	16 May 1999
South Africa	8	4	3	1	0	50	26 February 1992
Sri Lanka	12	9	2	0	1	72.72	11 June 1975
West Indies	10	5	5	0	0	50	15 June 1975
Zimbabwe	9	8	1	0	0	88.88	9 June 1983
Total	107	79	26	1	1	75.48	–

== Tournament records ==
=== 1975 Cricket World Cup ===
Squad

- Ian Chappell (c)
- Greg Chappell (vc)
- Ross Edwards
- Gary Gilmour
- Alan Hurst
- Bruce Laird
- Dennis Lillee
- Rick McCosker
- Ashley Mallett
- Rod Marsh (wk)
- Jeff Thomson
- Alan Turner
- Max Walker
- Doug Walters

Results

Event	Group stage				Semifinal	Final	Overall Result
Event	Opposition Result	Opposition Result	Opposition Result	Rank	Opposition Result	Opposition Result	Overall Result
1975	Pakistan; W by 73 runs	Sri Lanka; W by 52 runs	West Indies; L by 7 wickets	2Q	England; W by 4 wickets	West Indies; L by 17 runs	Runners-up

Scorecards

Group stage (Group B)

7 June 1975
Scorecard

Australia; 278/7 (60 overs)	v	Pakistan; 205 (53 overs)
Ross Edwards 80* (94); Naseer Malik 2/37 (12 overs)		Majid Khan 65 (76); Dennis Lillee 5/34 (12 overs)

Australia won by 73 runs
Headingley, Leeds
Umpires: Bill Alley (Eng) and Tom Spencer (Eng)
Player of the match: Dennis Lillee (AUS)

11 June 1975
Scorecard

Australia; 328/5 (60 overs)	v	Sri Lanka; 276/4 (60 overs)
Alan Turner 101 (113); Somachandra de Silva 2/60 (12 overs)		Sunil Wettimuny 53 (102); Ian Chappell 2/14 (4 overs)

Australia won by 52 runs
The Oval, London
Umpires: Lloyd Budd (Eng) and Arthur Fagg (Eng)
Player of the match: Alan Turner (AUS)

14 June 1975
Scorecard

Australia; 192 (53.4 overs)	v	West Indies; 195/3 (46 overs)
Ross Edwards 58 (74); Andy Roberts 3/39 (10.4 overs)		Alvin Kallicharran 78 (83); Ashley Mallett 1/35 (11 overs)

West Indies won by 7 wickets
The Oval, London
Umpires: Dickie Bird (Eng) and David Constant (Eng)
Player of the match: Alvin Kallicharran (WI)

Knockout stage

Semi-final 1
18 June 1975
Scorecard

England; 93 (36.2 overs)	v	Australia; 94/6 (28.4 overs)
Mike Denness 27 (60); Gary Gilmour 6/14 (12 overs)		Gary Gilmour 28* (28); Chris Old 3/29 (7 overs)

Australia won by 4 wickets
Headingley, Leeds
Umpires: Bill Alley (Eng) and David Constant (Eng)
Player of the match: Gary Gilmour (Aus)

Final
21 June 1975
Scorecard

West Indies; 291/8 (60 overs)	v	Australia; 274 (58.4 overs)
Clive Lloyd 102 (85); Gary Gilmour 5/48 (12 overs)		Ian Chappell 62 (93); Keith Boyce 4/50 (12 overs)

West Indies won by 17 runs
Lord's, London
Umpires: Dickie Bird (Eng) and Tom Spencer (Eng)
Player of the match: Clive Lloyd (WI)

Summary

The 1975 Cricket World Cup was the first Cricket World Cup. It was held in England in June 1975 and consisted of two weeks of one-day matches played 60-overs-a-side. The format consisted of a group stage, in which each team played the other three teams in its group of four. The top two teams from both groups would progress to the semifinals. Australia was placed in group B along with Pakistan, West Indies and Sri Lanka. For this world cup, the Australian side was led by Ian Chappell. The ODI format of cricket at that time was new for most teams, and Australia was among more experienced one day cricket teams at that time, with a decent batting and bowling lineup. So they were considered among tournament favorites.

Australia first played Pakistan at Leeds, and as expected, won the match. Australia won the toss and elected to bat first. All top order batsmen played well( Alan Turner, Rick McCosker, Ian Chappell and Greg Chappell). A quick 80 run off 94 balls of Ross Edwards took Australia to 278/7. Then a five wicket haul of Dennis Lillee helped Australia to bundle out Pakistan for 205. Australia then played non test playing Sri Lanka and were expected to easily win against the minnows. But though they won, their winning was not that one sided as expected. Once again Turner played well scoring a century (101 runs, 113 balls) and took Australia to a mammoth 328. But Sri Lanka's batsmen played well and despite Australia's strong bowling attack, were able to reach 276 in 60 overs. This match was also accompanied by lot of drama, as Sunil Wettimuny and Duleep Mendis got retired hurt off Dennis Lillee's and Jeff Thomson's deliveries, and were playing well. In fact, Sri Lanka could have won the match if they remained at the crease. With this win, Australia progressed to the semifinals. The last group match of Australia was with West Indies, the team who was dominating world cricket at that time. West Indies won the toss and elected to field first. Except of Ross Edwards and Rod Marsh, who showed resistance scoring half centuries, the rest of the Australian lineup struggled against West Indian bowling attack led by Andy Roberts and Keith Boyce, and Australia were all out for 192. None of the Australian bowlers could make an impact as West Indies chased down the target with ease. With this loss, Australia finished second in group B and had to face England in semifinals.

Australia won the toss and choose to field on a bowling friendly wicket. The Australians dominated the first innings, and with the help of Gary Gilmour who took six wickets, bundled out England for 93. However, they received a terrible setback in second innings as they were reduced to 39/6. From then on, Gilmour and Doug Walters played patiently and took Australia to an uncertain victory. With this win Australia entered the finals where they had to face a strong West Indies, who were the only team to which they had lost so far in the tournament.

In the finals Australia won the toss and elected to field. West Indian captain Clive Lloyd scored a century and enabled west Indies to reach 291/8. Among Australia only Gilmour bowled well, taking five wickets. In chasing, the Australian batsmen's running between the wickets turned out to be very poor, and five of them were run out. In fact, they never looked to chase the target, and eventually lost by 17 runs.

=== 1979 Cricket World Cup ===
Squad

- Kim Hughes (c)
- Allan Border
- Gary Cosier
- Rick Darling
- Alan Hurst
- Geoff Dymock
- Andrew Hilditch
- Rodney Hogg
- Trevor Laughlin
- Kevin Wright (wk)
- Jeff Moss
- Graeme Porter
- Graham Yallop
- Dav Whatmore

Results

Event	Group stage				Semifinal	Final	Overall Result
Event	Opposition Result	Opposition Result	Opposition Result	Rank	Opposition Result	Opposition Result	Overall Result
1979	England; L by 6 wickets	Pakistan; L by 89 runs	Canada; W by 7 wickets	3	Did not advance		Group Stage

Scorecards

Group stage (Group A)

9 June 1979
Scorecard

Australia; 159/9 (60 overs)	v	England; 160/4 (47.1 overs)
Andrew Hilditch 47 (108); Geoffrey Boycott 2/15 (6 overs)		Graham Gooch 53 (96); Trevor Laughlin 2/38 (9.1 overs)

England won by 6 wickets
Lord's, London, England
Umpires: David Constant (Eng) and Barrie Meyer (Eng)
Player of the match: Graham Gooch (Eng)

13, 14 June 1979
Scorecard

Pakistan; 286/7 (60 overs)	v	Australia; 197 (57.1 overs)
Asif Iqbal 61 (57); Gary Cosier 3/54 (12 overs)		Andrew Hilditch 72 (129); Sikander Bakht 3/34 (11 overs)

Pakistan won by 89 runs
Trent Bridge, Nottingham, England
Umpires: Dickie Bird (Eng) and Ken Palmer (Eng)
Player of the match: Asif Iqbal (Pak)

- Reserve day used

16 June 1979
Scorecard

Canada; 105 (33.2 overs)	v	Australia; 106/3 (26 overs)
John Vaughan 29 (43); Alan Hurst 5/21 (10 overs)		Kim Hughes 27 (40); Cornelius Henry 2/27 (10 overs)

Australia won by 7 wickets
Edgbaston, Birmingham, England
Umpires: David Constant (Eng) and John Langridge (Eng)
Player of the match: Alan Hurst (Aus)

Summary

The second edition of the Cricket World Cup was held in 1979 once again in England and with the same tournament format as in 1975. This time the Australian team for the world cup was almost entirely different from the 1975 Cricket World Cup, and was led by young batsmen Kim Hughes. The team was somewhat less experienced than previous squad, but still were expected to put a decent show. This time Australia was placed in Group A, along with England, Pakistan and associates Canada.

Australia began their campaign with a huge loss against tournament favourites England. Batting first, Australia were in a good situation, with Andrew Hilditch, Rick Darling and Allan Border taking Australia to 131/3. But after Border was dismissed, the middle order, consisting of Graham Yallop, Gary Cosier and Trevor Laughlin, collapsed in run outs. The tailenders were also easily taken over by English bowling, and Australia was bowled out for 159. Then a half century scored by Graham Gooch ensured England chasing the target without much hassle, reducing Australia's next two matches to must wins. Australia were then knocked out in next match against Pakistan. Pakistan, sent to bat first by Australia, scored 286/7 in 60 overs thanks to Majid Khan(61 runs, 107 balls) and skipper Asif Iqbal(61 runs, 75 balls), who received support from other batsmen as well. For Australia, Hilditch scored 72 and Yallop scored 37, but they received little support from other batsmen as they failed to withstand Majid Khan, Imran Khan and Sikander Bakht, who took 8 wickets in total. Eventually, Australia was bowled out for 197. Australia played for pride against Canada at Birmingham in their last group match. Australian bowler Alan Hurst(5/21) ripped through amateurish Canadian batting and bundled them out for 105. The score was easily chased down in 26 overs with the loss of 3 wickets. Despite this win, this tournament is considered as the worst ever world cup tournament for Australian team, as they lost to both test playing nations in their group in a completely one sided manner.

=== 1983 Cricket World Cup ===
Squad

- Kim Hughes (c)
- Allan Border
- Tom Hogan
- Graeme Wood
- David Hookes
- Geoff Lawson
- Dennis Lillee
- Rodney Hogg
- Trevor Chappell
- Rod Marsh (wk)
- Ken MacLeay
- Jeff Thomson
- Graham Yallop
- Kepler Wessels

Results

Event	Group stage							Semifinal	Final	Overall Result
Event	Opposition Result	Opposition Result	Opposition Result	Opposition Result	Opposition Result	Opposition Result	Rank	Opposition Result	Opposition Result	Overall Result
1983	Zimbabwe; L by 13 runs	West Indies; L by 101 runs	India; W by 162 runs	Zimbabwe; W by 32 runs	West Indies; L by 7 wickets	India; L by 118 runs	3	Did not advance		Group Stage

Scorecards

Group stage (Group B)

13 June 1983
Scorecard

Australia; 320/9 (60 overs)	v	India; 158 (37.5 overs)
Trevor Chappell 110 (131); Kapil Dev 5/43 (12 overs)		Kapil Dev 40 (27); Ken MacLeay 6/39 (11.5 overs)

Australia won by 162 runs
Trent Bridge, Nottingham, England
Umpires: Don Oslear and Roy Palmer
Player of the match: Trevor Chappell

11 June 1983
Scorecard

West Indies; 252/9 (60 overs)	v	Australia; 151 (30.3 overs)
Larry Gomes 78 (153); Geoff Lawson 3/29 (12 overs)		David Hookes 45 (45); Winston Davis 7/51 (10.3 overs)

West Indies won by 101 runs
Headingley, Leeds, England
Umpires: David Constant and David Evans
Player of the match: Winston Davis

- Reserve day on 12 June used, 42 overs of West Indies's innings completed on 11 June.

13 June 1983
Scorecard

Australia; 320/9 (60 overs)	v	India; 158 (37.5 overs)
Trevor Chappell 110 (131); Kapil Dev 5/43 (12 overs)		Kapil Dev 40 (27); Ken MacLeay 6/39 (11.5 overs)

Australia won by 162 runs
Trent Bridge, Nottingham, England
Umpires: Don Oslear and Roy Palmer
Player of the match: Trevor Chappell

16 June 1983
Scorecard

Australia; 272/7 (60 overs)	v	Zimbabwe; 240 (59.5 overs)
Graeme Wood 73 (121); John Traicos 2/28 (12 overs)		David Houghton 84 (108); Rodney Hogg 3/40 (11.5 overs)

Australia won by 32 runs
County Ground, Southampton, England
Umpires: David Evans and Roy Palmer
Player of the match: David Houghton

18 June 1983
Scorecard

Australia; 273/6 (60 overs)	v	West Indies; 276/3 (57.5 overs)
Kim Hughes 69 (124); Malcolm Marshall 2/36 (12 overs)		Viv Richards 95* (117); Rodney Hogg 1/25 (12 overs)

West Indies won by 7 wickets
Lord's, London, England
Umpires: Roy Palmer and Alan Whitehead
Player of the match: Viv Richards

20 June 1983
Scorecard

India; 247 (55.5 overs)	v	Australia; 129 (39.2 overs)
Yashpal Sharma 40 (40); Rodney Hogg 3/40 (12 overs)		Allan Border 36 (49); Madan Lal 4/20 (8.2 overs)

India won by 118 runs
County Ground, Chelmsford
Umpires: Jack Birkenshaw and David Shepherd
Player of the match: Roger Binny

=== 1987 Cricket World Cup ===
Squad

- Allan Border(c)
- Tim May
- Dean Jones
- David Boon
- Geoff Marsh
- Tom Moody
- Craig McDermott
- Simon O'Donnell
- Greg Dyer (wk)
- Bruce Reid
- Peter Taylor
- Steve Waugh
- Mike Veletta
- Andrew Zesers

Results

Event	Group stage							Semifinal	Final	Overall Result
Event	Opposition Result	Opposition Result	Opposition Result	Opposition Result	Opposition Result	Opposition Result	Rank	Opposition Result	Opposition Result	Overall Result
1987	India; W by 1 run	Zimbabwe; W by 96 runs	New Zealand; W by 3 runs	India; L by 56 runs	New Zealand; W by 17 runs	Zimbabwe; W by 70 runs	2	Pakistan; W by 18 runs	England; W by 7 runs	Winners

Scorecards

Group stage (Group A)

9 October 1987
Scorecard

Australia; 270/6 (50 overs)	v	India; 269 (49.5 overs)
Geoff Marsh 110 (141); Manoj Prabhakar 2/47 (10 overs)		Navjot Sidhu 73 (79); Craig McDermott 4/56 (10 overs)

Australia won by 1 run
MA Chidambaram Stadium, Madras, India
Umpires: David Archer (England) and Dickie Bird (England)
Player of the match: Geoff Marsh (Australia)

13 October 1987
Scorecard

Australia; 235/9 (50 overs)	v	Zimbabwe; 139 (49.4 overs)
Allan Border 67 (88); Kevin Curran 2/29 (8 overs)		Kevin Curran 30 (38); Simon O'Donnell 4/39 (9.4 overs)

Australia won by 96 runs
MA Chidambaram Stadium, Madras, India
Umpires: Khizer Hayat(Pakistan) and David Shepherd (England)
Player of the match: Steve Waugh (Australia)

18 October 1987
Scorecard

Australia; 199/4 (30 overs)	v	New Zealand; 196/9 (30 overs)
David Boon 87 (96); Martin Snedden 2/36 (6 overs)		Martin Crowe 58 (48); Steve Waugh 2/36 (6 overs)

Australia won by 3 runs
Nehru Stadium, Indore, India
Umpires: David Archer (West Indies) and Khizer Hayat (Pakistan)
Player of the match: David Boon (Australia)

- No play on 18 October due to rain. Reserve day on 19 October used, further rain reduced match to 30 overs per side.

22 October 1987
Scorecard

India; 289/6 (50 overs)	v	Australia; 233 (49 overs)
Dilip Vengsarkar 63 (60); Craig McDermott 3/61 (10 overs)		David Boon 62 (59); Mohammad Azharuddin 3/19 (3.5 overs)

India won by 56 runs
Feroz Shah Kotla, Delhi, India
Umpires: Khalid Aziz (Pakistan) and David Shepherd (England)
Player of the match: Mohammad Azharuddin (India)

- Andrew Zesers (Aus) made his ODI debut.

27 October 1987
Scorecard

Australia; 251/8 (50 overs)	v	New Zealand; 234 (48.4 overs)
Geoff Marsh 126 (149); Willie Watson 2/46 (8 overs)		John Wright 61 (82); Allan Border 2/27 (7 overs)

Australia won by 17 runs
Sector 16 Stadium, Chandigarh, India
Umpires: Khizer Hayat (Pakistan) and David Shepherd (England)
Player of the match: Geoff Marsh (Australia)

30 October 1987
Scorecard

Australia; 266/5 (50 overs)	v	Zimbabwe; 196/6 (50 overs)
David Boon 93 (101); John Traicos 2/45 (10 overs)		Andrew Pycroft 38 (46); Tim May 2/30 (10 overs)

Australia won by 70 runs
Barabati Stadium, Cuttack, India
Umpires: Mahboob Shah (Pakistan) and PW Vidanagamage (Sri Lanka)
Player of the match: David Boon (Australia)

Knockout stage

Semi-final 1
4 November 1987
Scorecard

Australia; 267/6 (50 overs)	v	Pakistan; 249 (49 overs)
David Boon 65 (91); Imran Khan 3/36 (10 overs)		Javed Miandad 70 (103); Craig McDermott 5/44 (10 overs)

Australia won by 18 runs
Gaddafi Stadium, Lahore, Pakistan
Umpires: Dickie Bird and David Shepherd (Both ENG)
Player of the match: Craig McDermott (AUS)

- Australia won the toss and elected to bat
- Australia qualified for the final for second time after 1975.

Final
8 November 1987
Scorecard

Australia; 253/5 (50 overs)	v	England; 246/8 (50 overs)
David Boon 75 (125); Eddie Hemmings 2/48 (10 overs)		Bill Athey 58 (103); Steve Waugh 2/37 (9 overs)

Australia won by 7 runs
Eden Gardens, Calcutta, India
Umpires: Ram Gupta (India) and Mahboob Shah (Pakistan)
Player of the match: David Boon (Australia)

=== 1992 Cricket World Cup ===
Squad

- Allan Border(c)
- Merv Hughes
- Dean Jones
- David Boon
- Geoff Marsh
- Tom Moody
- Craig McDermott
- Mark Waugh
- Ian Healy (wk)
- Bruce Reid
- Peter Taylor
- Steve Waugh
- Mike Whitney
- Mark Taylor

Results

Event	Round-robin stage									Semifinal	Final	Overall Result
Event	Opposition Result	Opposition Result	Opposition Result	Opposition Result	Opposition Result	Opposition Result	Opposition Result	Opposition Result	Rank	Opposition Result	Opposition Result	Overall Result
1992	New Zealand; L by 37 runs	South Africa; L by 9 wickets	India; W by 1 runs	England; L by 8 wickets	Sri Lanka; W by 7 wickets	Pakistan; L by 48 runs	Zimbabwe; W by 128 runs	West Indies; W by 57 runs	5	Did not advance		Round-robin stage

Scorecards

Round-robin stage

22 February 1992
Scorecard

New Zealand; 248/6 (50 overs)	v	Australia; 211 (48.1 overs)
Martin Crowe 100* (134); Craig McDermott 2/43 (10 overs)		David Boon 100 (133); Gavin Larsen 3/30 (10 overs)

New Zealand won by 37 runs
Eden Park, Auckland, New Zealand
Umpires: Khizer Hayat (Pakistan) and David Shepherd (England)
Player of the match: Martin Crowe (New Zealand)

26 February 1992
Scorecard

Australia; 170/9 (49 overs)	v	South Africa; 171/1 (46.5 overs)
David Boon 27 (31); Allan Donald 3/34 (10 overs)		Kepler Wessels 81* (148); Peter Taylor 1/32 (10 overs)

South Africa won by 9 wickets
Sydney Cricket Ground, Sydney, Australia
Umpires: Brian Aldridge (New Zealand) and Steve Bucknor (West Indies)
Player of the match: Kepler Wessels (South Africa)

1 March 1992
Scorecard

Australia; 237/9 (50 overs)	v	India; 234 (47 overs)
Dean Jones 90 (108); Kapil Dev 3/41 (10 overs)		Mohammed Azharuddin 93 (102); Tom Moody 3/56 (9 overs)

Australia won by 1 run (revised target)
Brisbane Cricket Ground, Brisbane, Australia
Umpires: Brian Aldridge (New Zealand) and Ian Robinson (Zimbabwe)
Player of the match: Dean Jones (Australia)

- Rain interrupted play after 16.2 overs in the Indian innings (45/1). India's target recalculated to 236 off 47 overs.

5 March 1992
Scorecard

Australia; 171 (49 overs)	v	England; 173/2 (40.5 overs)
Tom Moody 51 (88); Ian Botham 4/31 (10 overs)		Graham Gooch 58 (112); Mike Whitney 1/28 (10 overs)

England won by 8 wickets
Sydney Cricket Ground, Sydney, Australia
Umpires: Steve Bucknor (West Indies) and Khizer Hayat (Pakistan)
Player of the match: Ian Botham (England)

7 March 1992
Scorecard

Sri Lanka; 189/9 (50 overs)	v	Australia; 190/3 (44 overs)
Aravinda de Silva 62 (83); Peter Taylor 2/34 (10 overs)		Geoff Marsh 60 (113); Pramodya Wickramasinghe 2/29 (10 overs)

Australia won by 7 wickets
Adelaide Oval, Adelaide, Australia
Umpires: Piloo Reporter (India) and Ian Robinson (Zimbabwe)
Player of the match: Tom Moody (Australia)

11 March 1992
Scorecard

Pakistan; 220/9 (50 overs)	v	Australia; 172 (45.2 overs)
Aamir Sohail 76 (104); Steve Waugh 3/36 (10 overs)		Dean Jones 47 (79); Aaqib Javed 3/21 (8 overs)

Pakistan won by 48 runs
WACA Ground, Perth, Australia
Umpires: Karl Liebenberg (South Africa) and Piloo Reporter (India)
Player of the match: Aamir Sohail (Pakistan)

14 March 1992
Scorecard

Australia; 265/6 (50 overs)	v	Zimbabwe; 137 (41.4 overs)
Mark Waugh 66* (39); John Traicos 1/30 (10 overs)		Eddo Brandes 23 (28); Peter Taylor 2/14 (3.4 overs)

Australia won by 128 runs
Bellerive Oval, Hobart, Australia
Umpires: Brian Aldridge (New Zealand) and Steve Bucknor (West Indies)
Player of the match: Steve Waugh (Australia)

18 March 1992
Scorecard

Australia; 216/6 (50 overs)	v	West Indies; 159 (42.4 overs)
David Boon 100 (147); Andy Cummins 3/38 (10 overs)		Brian Lara 70 (97); Mike Whitney 4/34 (10 overs)

Australia won by 57 runs
Melbourne Cricket Ground, Melbourne, Australia
Umpires: Piloo Reporter (India) and David Shepherd (England)
Player of the match: David Boon (Australia)

=== 1996 Cricket World Cup ===
Squad

- Mark Taylor(c)
- Michael Bevan
- Damien Fleming
- Glenn McGrath
- Stuart Law
- Shane Lee
- Craig McDermott
- Mark Waugh
- Ian Healy (wk)
- Ricky Ponting
- Paul Reiffel
- Steve Waugh
- Shane Warne
- Michael Slater

Results

Event	Group stage						Quarter finals	Semifinal	Final	Overall Result
Event	Opposition Result	Opposition Result	Opposition Result	Opposition Result	Opposition Result	Rank	Opposition Result	Opposition Result	Opposition Result	Overall Result
1996	Sri Lanka; L by forfeited	Kenya; W by 97 runs	India; W by 16 runs	Zimbabwe; W by 8 wickets	West Indies; L by 8 wickets	2	New Zealand; W by 6 wickets	West Indies; W by 5 runs	Sri Lanka; L by 7 Wickets	Runners

Scorecards

Group stage (Group A)

17 February
Scorecard

Sri Lanka	v	Australia

Sri Lanka won by a walkover
R. Premadasa Stadium, Colombo
Umpires: Cyril Mitchley (SA) and Mahboob Shah (Pak)

- No toss.
- Australia forfeited the match due to safety concerns, and were in Mumbai at the time of the match.

23 February
Scorecard

Australia; 304/7 (50 overs)	v	Kenya; 207/7 (50 overs)
Mark Waugh 130 (128); Rajab Ali 3/45 (10 overs)		Kennedy Otieno 85 (137); Paul Reiffel 2/18 (7 overs)

Australia won by 97 runs
Indira Priyadarshini Stadium, Visakhapatnam
Umpires: Cyril Mitchley (SA) and David Shepherd (Eng)
Player of the match: Mark Waugh (Aus)

- Kenya won the toss and elected to field.

27 February
Scorecard

Australia; 258 (50 overs)	v	India; 242 (48 overs)
Mark Waugh 126 (135); Venkatapathy Raju 2/48 (10 overs)		Sachin Tendulkar 90 (84); Damien Fleming 5/36 (9 overs)

Australia won by 16 runs
Wankhede Stadium, Mumbai
Umpires: Steve Dunne (NZ) and David Shepherd (Eng)
Player of the match: Mark Waugh (Aus)

- Australia won the toss and elected to bat.

1 March
Scorecard

Zimbabwe; 154 (45.3 overs)	v	Australia; 158/2 (36 overs)
Andy Waller 67 (101); Shane Warne 4/34 (9.3 overs)		Mark Waugh 76* (109); Paul Strang 2/33 (10 overs)

Australia won by 8 wickets
Vidarbha Cricket Association Ground, Nagpur
Umpires: Steve Dunne (NZ) and David Shepherd (Eng)
Player of the match: Shane Warne (Aus)

- Zimbabwe won the toss and elected to bat.

4 March
Scorecard

Australia; 229/6 (50 overs)	v	West Indies; 232/6 (48.5 overs)
Ricky Ponting 102 (112); Courtney Walsh 2/35 (9 overs)		Richie Richardson 93* (133); Mark Waugh 3/38 (10 overs)

West Indies won by 4 wickets
Sawai Mansingh Stadium, Jaipur
Umpires: Mahboob Shah (Pak) and David Shepherd (Eng)
Player of the match: Richie Richardson (WI)

- Australia won the toss and elected to bat.

Knockout stage

Quarter-final 4
11 March
Scorecard

New Zealand; 286/9 (50 overs)	v	Australia; 289/4 (47.5 overs)
Chris Harris 130 (124); Glenn McGrath 2/50 (9 overs)		Mark Waugh 110 (112); Nathan Astle 1/21 (3 overs)

Australia won by 6 wickets
MA Chidambaram Stadium, Madras
Umpires: Cyril Mitchley and Srinivasaraghavan Venkataraghavan
Player of the match: Mark Waugh (Aus)

- New Zealand won the toss and elected to bat first.

Semi-final 2
14 March
Scorecard

Australia; 207/8 (50 overs)	v	West Indies; 202 (49.3 overs)
Stuart Law 72 (105); Curtly Ambrose 2/26 (10 overs)		Shivnarine Chanderpaul 80 (126); Shane Warne 4/36 (9 overs)

Australia won by 5 runs
Punjab Cricket Association Stadium, Mohali
Umpires: B. C. Cooray and Srinivasaraghavan Venkataraghavan
Player of the match: Shane Warne (Aus)

- Australia won the toss and elected to bat.
- Australia qualified for the final for third time after 1975 and 1987.

Final
17 March (D/N)
Scorecard

Australia; 241/7 (50 overs)	v	Sri Lanka; 245/3 (46.2 overs)
Mark Taylor 74 (83); Aravinda de Silva 3/42 (9 overs)		Aravinda de Silva 107* (124); Damien Fleming 1/43 (6 overs)

Sri Lanka won by 7 wickets
Gaddafi Stadium, Lahore
Umpires: Steve Bucknor and David Shepherd
Player of the match: Aravinda de Silva (SL)

- Sri Lanka won the toss and elected to field.

=== 1999 Cricket World Cup ===
Squad

- Steve Waugh(c)
- Michael Bevan
- Damien Fleming
- Glenn McGrath
- Tom Moody
- Shane Lee
- Brendon Julian
- Mark Waugh
- Adam Gilchrist (wk)
- Ricky Ponting
- Paul Reiffel
- Darren Lehmann
- Shane Warne
- Adam Dale
- Damien Martyn

Results

Event	Pool stage						Super Sixes				Semifinal	Final	Overall Result
Event	Opposition Result	Opposition Result	Opposition Result	Opposition Result	Opposition Result	Rank	Opposition Result	Opposition Result	Opposition Result	Rank	Opposition Result	Opposition Result	Overall Result
1999	Scotland; W by 6 wickets	New Zealand; L by 5 wickets	Pakistan; L by 10 runs	Bangladesh; W by 7 wickets	West Indies; W by 6 wickets	2	India; W by 77 runs	Zimbabwe; W by 44 runs	South Africa; W by 5 wickets	2	South Africa; Tied Qualified by net run rate	Pakistan; W by 8 wickets	Winners

Scorecards

Pool stage (Pool B)

16 May 1999
Scorecard

Scotland; 181/7 (50 overs)	v	Australia; 182/4 (44.5 overs)
Gavin Hamilton 34 (42); Shane Warne 3/39 (10 overs)		Mark Waugh 67 (114); Nick Dyer 2/43 (10 overs)

Australia won by 6 wickets
New Road, Worcester
Umpires: Steve Dunne (NZ) and Peter Willey (Eng)
Player of the match: Mark Waugh (Aus)

- Australia won the toss and elected to field.

20 May 1999
Scorecard

Australia; 213/8 (50 overs)	v	New Zealand; 214/5 (45.2 overs)
Darren Lehmann 76 (94); Geoff Allott 4/37 (10 overs)		Roger Twose 80* (99); Damien Fleming 2/43 (8.2 overs)

New Zealand won by 5 wickets
Sophia Gardens, Cardiff
Umpires: Javed Akhtar (Pak) and David Shepherd (Eng)
Player of the match: Roger Twose (NZ)

- Australia won the toss and elected to bat.

23 May 1999
Scorecard

Pakistan; 275/8 (50 overs)	v	Australia; 265 (49.5 overs)
Inzamam-ul-Haq 81 (104); Damien Fleming 2/37 (10 overs)		Michael Bevan 61 (80); Wasim Akram 4/40 (9.5 overs)

Pakistan won by 10 runs
Headingley, Leeds
Umpires: Rudi Koertzen (SA) and Peter Willey (Eng)
Player of the match: Inzamam-ul-Haq (Pak)

- Australia won the toss and elected to field.

27 May 1999
Scorecard

Bangladesh; 178/7 (50 overs)	v	Australia; 181/3 (19.5 overs)
Minhajul Abedin 53* (99); Tom Moody 3/25 (10 overs)		Adam Gilchrist 63 (39); Enamul Haque 2/40 (5 overs)

Australia won by 7 wickets
Riverside Ground, Chester-le-Street
Umpires: Steve Bucknor (WI) and Dave Orchard (SA)
Player of the match: Tom Moody (Aus)

- Australia won the toss and elected to field.

30 May 1999
Scorecard

West Indies; 110 (46.4 overs)	v	Australia; 111/4 (40.4 overs)
Ridley Jacobs 49* (142); Glenn McGrath 5/14 (8.4 overs)		Adam Gilchrist 21 (36); Curtly Ambrose 3/31 (10 overs)

Australia won by 6 wickets
Old Trafford, Manchester
Umpires: Steve Dunne (NZ) and K. T. Francis (SL)
Player of the match: Glenn McGrath (Aus)

- Australia won the toss and elected to field.
- Australia needed to score 111 within 47.2 overs to qualify for the Super Six stage of the tournament. Australia qualified for the Super Sixes.

Super Six

4 June 1999
Scorecard

Australia; 282/6 (50 overs)	v	India; 205 (48.2 overs)
Mark Waugh 83 (99); Robin Singh 2/43 (7 overs)		Ajay Jadeja 100* (138); Glenn McGrath 3/34 (10 overs)

Australia won by 77 runs
The Oval, London
Umpires: Steve Bucknor (WI) and Peter Willey (Eng)
Player of the match: Glenn McGrath (Aus)

- India won the toss and elected to field.

9 June 1999
Scorecard

Australia; 303/4 (50 overs)	v	Zimbabwe; 259/6 (50 overs)
Mark Waugh 104 (120); Neil Johnson 2/43 (8 overs)		Neil Johnson 132* (144); Paul Reiffel 3/55 (10 overs)

Australia won by 44 runs
Lord's, London
Umpires: Doug Cowie (NZ) and Rudi Koertzen (SA)
Player of the match: Neil Johnson (Zim)

- Zimbabwe won the toss and elected to field.

13 June 1999
Scorecard

South Africa; 271/7 (50 overs)	v	Australia; 272/5 (49.4 overs)
Herschelle Gibbs 101 (134); Damien Fleming 3/57 (10 overs)		Steve Waugh 120* (110); Steve Elworthy 2/46 (10 overs)

Australia won by 5 wickets
Headingley, Leeds
Umpires: Srinivasaraghavan Venkataraghavan (Ind) and Peter Willey (Eng)
Player of the match: Steve Waugh (Aus)

- South Africa won the toss and elected to bat.
- Australia qualified for the semi-finals.

Knockout stage

Semi-final 2
17 June 1999
Scorecard

Australia; 213 (49.2 overs)	v	South Africa; 213 (49.4 overs)
Michael Bevan 65 (110); Shaun Pollock 5/36 (9.2 overs)		Jacques Kallis 53 (92); Shane Warne 4/29 (10 overs)

Match tied
Edgbaston, Birmingham, England
Umpires: David Shepherd (Eng) and Srinivas Venkataraghavan (Ind)
Player of the match: Shane Warne (Aus)

- South Africa won the toss and elected to field.

Final
20 June 1999
Scorecard

Pakistan; 132 (39 overs)	v	Australia; 133/2 (20.1 overs)
Ijaz Ahmed 22 (46); Shane Warne 4/33 (9 overs)		Adam Gilchrist 54 (36); Saqlain Mushtaq 1/21 (4.1 overs)

Australia win by 8 wickets
Lord's, London
Attendance: 30,040
Umpires: Steve Bucknor (WI) and David Shepherd (Eng)
Player of the match: Shane Warne (Aus)

- Pakistan won the toss and elected to bat.

=== 2003 Cricket World Cup ===
Squad

- Ricky Ponting(c)
- Michael Bevan
- Jason Gillespie
- Glenn McGrath
- Nathan Bracken
- Brett Lee
- Brad Hogg
- Jimmy Maher
- Adam Gilchrist (wk)
- Andy Bichel
- Andrew Symonds
- Darren Lehmann
- Shane Warne
- Ian Harvey
- Damien Martyn
- Matthew Hayden
- Nathan Hauritz
- Note:Australia made three replacements in the squad – Ian Harvey replacing Shane Watson on 25 January 2003, Nathan Hauritz replacing Shane Warne on 24 February 2003, and Nathan Bracken replacing Jason Gillespie on 5 March 2003.

Results

Event	Pool stage							Super Sixes				Semifinal	Final	Overall Result
Event	Opposition Result	Opposition Result	Opposition Result	Opposition Result	Opposition Result	Opposition Result	Rank	Opposition Result	Opposition Result	Opposition Result	Rank	Opposition Result	Opposition Result	Overall Result
2003	Pakistan; W by 82 runs	India; W by 9 wickets	Netherlands; W by 75 runs	Zimbabwe; W by 7 wickets	Namibia; W by 256 runs	England; W by 2 wickets	1	Sri Lanka; W by 96 runs	New Zealand; W by 96 runs	Kenya; W by 5 wickets	1	Sri Lanka; W by 48 runs	India; W by 125 runs	Winners

Scorecards

Pool stage (Pool A)

11 February 2003
Scorecard

Australia; 310/8 (50 overs)	v	Pakistan; 228 (44.3 overs)
Andrew Symonds 143* (125); Wasim Akram 3/64 (10 overs)		Rashid Latif 33 (23); Ian Harvey 4/58 (9.3 overs)

Australia won by 82 runs
Wanderers Stadium, Johannesburg
Umpires: Asoka de Silva (SL) and David Shepherd (Eng)
Player of the match: Andrew Symonds (Aus)

- Pakistan won the toss elected to field.

15 February 2003
Scorecard

India; 125 (41.4 overs)	v	Australia; 128/1 (22.2 overs)
Sachin Tendulkar 36 (59); Jason Gillespie 3/13 (10 overs)		Adam Gilchrist 48 (61); Anil Kumble 1/24 (7 overs)

Australia won by 9 wickets
Centurion Park, Centurion
Umpires: Asoka de Silva (SL) and David Shepherd (Eng)
Player of the match: Jason Gillespie (Aus)

- India won the toss and elected to bat.

20 February 2003
Scorecard

Australia; 170/2 (36 overs)	v	Netherlands; 122 (30.2 overs)
Damien Martyn 67* (76); Tim de Leede 2/34 (7 overs)		Tim de Leede 24 (38); Andy Bichel 3/13 (3 overs)

Australia won by 75 runs (D/L method)
Senwes Park, Potchefstroom
Umpires: Dave Orchard (SA) and Peter Willey (Eng)
Player of the match: Damien Martyn (Aus)

- Netherlands won the toss elected to field.
- Match reduced to 36 overs per side due to rain

24 February 2003
Scorecard

Zimbabwe; 246/9 (50 overs)	v	Australia; 248/3 (47.3 overs)
Andy Flower 62 (91); Brad Hogg 3/46 (8 overs)		Adam Gilchrist 61 (64); Dougie Marillier 1/32 (10 overs)

Australia won by 7 wickets
Queens Sports Club, Bulawayo
Umpires: Billy Bowden (NZ) and Dave Orchard (SA)
Player of the match: Andy Blignaut (Zim)

- Zimbabwe won the toss and elected to bat.

27 February 2003
Scorecard

Australia; 301/6 (50 overs)	v	Namibia; 45 (14 overs)
Matthew Hayden 88 (73); Louis Burger 3/39 (10 overs)		Deon Kotze 10 (14); Glenn McGrath 7/15 (7 overs)

Australia won by 256 runs
Senwes Park, Potchefstroom
Umpires: Billy Bowden (NZ) and Russell Tiffin (Zim)
Player of the match: Glenn McGrath (Aus)

- Australia won the toss and elected to bat.

2 March 2003
Scorecard

England; 204/8 (50 overs)	v	Australia; 208/8 (49.4 overs)
Alec Stewart 46 (92); Andy Bichel 7/20 (10 overs)		Michael Bevan 74* (126); Andy Caddick 4/35 (9 overs)

Australia won by 2 wickets
St George's Park Cricket Ground, Port Elizabeth
Umpires: Aleem Dar (Pak) and Russell Tiffin (Zim)
Player of the match: Andy Bichel (Aus)

- England won the toss and elected to bat.

Super Sixes

7 March 2003
Scorecard

Australia; 319/5 (50 overs)	v	Sri Lanka; 223 (47.4 overs)
Ricky Ponting 114 (109); Dilhara Fernando 3/47 (9 overs)		Aravinda de Silva 92 (94); Brett Lee 3/52 (10 overs)

Australia won by 96 runs
Centurion Park, Centurion
Umpires: Billy Bowden (NZ) and David Shepherd (Eng)
Player of the match: Ricky Ponting (Aus)

- Australia won the toss and elected to bat.

11 March 2003
Scorecard

Australia; 208/9 (50 overs)	v	New Zealand; 112 (30.1 overs)
Andy Bichel 64 (83); Shane Bond 6/23 (10 overs)		Stephen Fleming 48 (70); Brett Lee 5/42 (9.1 overs)

Australia won by 96 runs
St George's Park Cricket Ground, Port Elizabeth
Umpires: Asoka de Silva (SL) and Steve Bucknor (WI)
Player of the match: Shane Bond (NZ)

- New Zealand won the toss and elected to field.

15 March 2003
Scorecard

Kenya; 174/8 (50 overs)	v	Australia; 178/5 (31.2 overs)
Steve Tikolo 51 (100); Brett Lee 3/14 (8 overs)		Adam Gilchrist 67 (43); Aasif Karim 3/7 (8.2 overs)

Australia won by 5 wickets
Kingsmead Cricket Ground, Durban
Umpires: Billy Bowden (NZ) and Steve Bucknor (WI)
Player of the match: Aasif Karim (Ken)

- Australia won the toss and elected to field.

Knockout stage

Semi-final 1
18 March 2003
Scorecard

Australia; 212/7 (50 overs)	v	Sri Lanka; 123/7 (38.1 overs)
Andrew Symonds 91* (118); Chaminda Vaas 3/34 (10 overs)		Kumar Sangakkara 39* (70); Brett Lee 3/35 (8 overs)

Australia won by 48 runs (D/L method)
St George's Park Cricket Ground, Port Elizabeth
Umpires: Rudi Koertzen (SA) and David Shepherd (Eng)
Player of the match: Andrew Symonds (Aus)

- Australia won the toss and elected to bat.
- Rain interrupted the innings of Sri Lanka at 38.1 overs.
- Sri Lanka were 48 runs behind the DLS par score of 172 from 38.1 overs.

{

Final
23 March 2003
Scorecard

Australia; 359/2 (50 overs)	v	India; 234 (39.2 overs)
Ricky Ponting 140* (121); Harbhajan Singh 2/49 (8 overs)		Virender Sehwag 82 (81); Glenn McGrath 3/52 (8.2 overs)

Australia won by 125 runs
Wanderers Stadium, Johannesburg
Umpires: Steve Bucknor (WI) and David Shepherd (Eng)
Player of the match: Ricky Ponting (Aus)

- India won the toss and elected to field.

=== 2007 Cricket World Cup ===
Squad

- Ricky Ponting(c)
- Michael Bevan
- Michael Clarke
- Glenn McGrath
- Nathan Bracken
- Brad Haddin
- Brad Hogg
- Brad Hodge
- Adam Gilchrist (wk)
- Michael Hussey
- Andrew Symonds
- Mitchell Johnson
- Shane Watson
- Shaun Tait
- Matthew Hayden
- Stuart Clark

Results

Event	Group stage				Super 8s							Semifinal	Final	Overall Result
Event	Opposition Result	Opposition Result	Opposition Result	Rank	Opposition Result	Opposition Result	Opposition Result	Opposition Result	Opposition Result	Opposition Result	Rank	Opposition Result	Opposition Result	Overall Result
2007	Scotland; W by 203 runs	Netherlands; W by 229 runs	South Africa; W by 83 runs	1	West Indies; W by 103 runs	Bangladesh; W by 10 wickets	England; W by 7 wickets	Ireland; W by 9 wickets	Sri Lanka; W by 7 wickets	New Zealand; W by 215 runs	1	South Africa; W by 7 wickets	Sri Lanka; W by 53 runs	Winners

Scorecards

Group stage (Group A)

14 March
Scorecard

Australia; 334/6 (50 overs)	v	Scotland; 131 (40.2 overs)
Ricky Ponting 113 (93); Majid Haq 2/49 (7 overs)		Colin Smith 51 (76); Glenn McGrath 3/14 (6 overs)

Australia won by 203 runs
Warner Park Stadium, Basseterre
Umpires: Steve Bucknor (WI) and Asoka de Silva (SL)
Player of the match: Ricky Ponting (Aus)

18 March
Scorecard

Australia; 358/5 (50 overs)	v	Netherlands; 129 (26.5 overs)
Brad Hodge 123* (89); Tim de Leede 2/40 (10 overs)		Daan van Bunge 33 (33); Brad Hogg 4/27 (4.5 overs)

Australia won by 229 runs
Warner Park Stadium, Basseterre
Umpires: Steve Bucknor (WI) and Tony Hill (NZ)
Player of the match: Brad Hodge (Aus)

24 March
Scorecard

Australia; 377/6 (50 overs)	v	South Africa; 294 (48 overs)
Matthew Hayden 101 (68); Andrew Hall 2/60 (10 overs)		AB de Villiers 92 (70); Brad Hogg 3/61 (10 overs)

Australia won by 83 runs
Warner Park Stadium, Basseterre
Umpires: Mark Benson (Eng) and Steve Bucknor (WI)
Player of the match: Matthew Hayden (Aus)

Super 8

27–28 March 2007
Scorecard

Australia; 322/6 (50 overs)	v	West Indies; 219 (45.3 overs)
Matthew Hayden 158 (143); Dwayne Bravo 2/49 (7 overs)		Brian Lara 77 (83); Glenn McGrath 3/31 (8 overs)

Australia won by 103 runs
Sir Vivian Richards Stadium, North Sound
Umpires: Aleem Dar (Pak) and Asad Rauf (Pak)
Player of the match: Matthew Hayden (Aus)

- West Indies won the toss and elected to field.

31 March 2007
Scorecard

Bangladesh; 104/6 (22 overs)	v	Australia; 106/0 (13.5 overs)
Mashrafe Mortaza 25* (17); Glenn McGrath 3/16 (5 overs)		Adam Gilchrist 59* (44)

Australia won by 10 wickets
Sir Vivian Richards Stadium, North Sound
Umpires: Aleem Dar (Pak) and Billy Bowden (NZ)
Player of the match: Glenn McGrath (Aus)

- Australia won the toss and elected to field.
- The match was shortened to 22 overs a side due to a wet outfield.

8 April 2007
Scorecard

England; 247 (49.5 overs)	v	Australia; 248/3 (47.2 overs)
Kevin Pietersen 104 (122); Nathan Bracken 3/33 (10 overs)		Ricky Ponting 86 (106); Andrew Flintoff 1/35 (10 overs)

Australia won by 7 wickets
Sir Vivian Richards Stadium, North Sound
Umpires: Billy Bowden (NZ) and Rudi Koertzen (SA)
Player of the match: Shaun Tait (Aus)

- England won the toss and elected to bat.

13 April 2007
Scorecard

Ireland; 91 (30 overs)	v	Australia; 92/1 (12.2 overs)
John Mooney 23 (44); Glenn McGrath 3/17 (7 overs)		Adam Gilchrist 34 (25); Trent Johnston 1/18 (3 overs)

Australia won by 9 wickets
Kensington Oval, Bridgetown
Umpires: Billy Bowden (NZ) and Rudi Koertzen (SA)
Player of the match: Glenn McGrath (Aus)

- Australia won the toss and elected to field.

16 April 2007
Scorecard

Sri Lanka; 226 (49.4 overs)	v	Australia; 232/3 (42.4 overs)
Mahela Jayawardene 72 (88); Nathan Bracken 4/19 (9.4 overs)		Ricky Ponting 66* (80); Russel Arnold 2/20 (4 overs)

Australia won by 7 wickets
National Cricket Stadium, Grenada
Umpires: Aleem Dar (Pak) and Billy Doctrove (WI)
Player of the match: Nathan Bracken (Aus)

- Sri Lanka won the toss and elected to bat.

20 April 2007
Scorecard

Australia; 348/6 (50 overs)	v	New Zealand; 133 (25.5 overs)
Matthew Hayden 103 (100); James Franklin 3/74 (8 overs)		Peter Fulton 62 (72); Brad Hogg 4/29 (6.5 overs)

Australia won by 215 runs
National Cricket Stadium, Grenada
Umpires: Aleem Dar (Pak) and Asad Rauf (Pak)
Player of the match: Matthew Hayden (Aus)

- Australia won the toss and elected to bat.

Knockout stage

Semi-final 2
25 April 2007
Scorecard

South Africa; 149 (43.5 overs)	v	Australia; 153/3 (31.3 overs)
Justin Kemp 49* (91); Shaun Tait 4/39 (10 overs)		Michael Clarke 60* (86); Shaun Pollock 1/16 (5 overs)

Australia won by 7 wickets
Beausejour Stadium, Gros Islet
Umpires: Steve Bucknor (WI) and Aleem Dar (Pak)
Player of the match: Glenn McGrath (Aus)

- South Africa won the toss and elected to bat.
- Australia qualified for the final for sixth time after 1975, 1987, 1996, 1999 and 2003.

Final
28 April 2007
Scorecard

Australia; 281/4 (38 overs)	v	Sri Lanka; 215/8 (36 overs)
Adam Gilchrist 149 (104); Lasith Malinga 2/49 (8 overs)		Sanath Jayasuriya 63 (67); Michael Clarke 2/33 (5 overs)

Australia won by 53 runs (D/L method)
Kensington Oval, Bridgetown
Umpires: Steve Bucknor (WI) and Aleem Dar (Pak)
Player of the match: Adam Gilchrist (Aus)

- Australia won the toss and elected to bat.
- The match was reduced to 38 overs per side due to rain.
- Sri Lanka were set a revised target of 269 runs from 36 overs.
- Glenn McGrath (Aus) played in his last ODI match.
- With this victory, Australia became the first team to win three consecutive World Cup titles.

=== 2011 Cricket World Cup ===
Squad

- Ricky Ponting(c)
- Callum Ferguson
- Michael Clarke
- John Hastings
- David Hussey
- Brad Haddin
- Brett Lee
- Jason Krejza
- Tim Paine (wk)
- Michael Hussey
- Cameron White
- Mitchell Johnson
- Shane Watson
- Shaun Tait
- Steve Smith

Results

Event	Group stage							Quarter final	Semifinal	Final	Overall Result
Event	Opposition Result	Opposition Result	Opposition Result	Opposition Result	Opposition Result	Opposition Result	Rank	Opposition Result	Opposition Result	Opposition Result	Overall Result
2011	Zimbabwe; W by 91 runs	New Zealand; W by 7 wickets	Sri Lanka; No Result	Kenya; W by 60 runs	Canada; W by 7 wickets	Pakistan; L by 4 wickets	3	India; L by 5 wickets	Did not advance		Quarter final

Scorecards

Group stage (Group A)

21 February 2011
14:30 (D/N)
Scorecard

Australia; 262/6 (50 overs)	v	Zimbabwe; 171 (46.2 overs)
Shane Watson 79 (92); Chris Mpofu 2/58 (9 overs)		Graeme Cremer 37 (51); Mitchell Johnson 4/19 (9.2 overs)

Australia won by 91 runs
Sardar Patel Stadium, Ahmedabad
Umpires: Asoka de Silva (SL) and Richard Kettleborough (Eng)
Player of the match: Shane Watson (Aus)

- Australia won the toss and elected to bat.

25 February 2011
09:30
Scorecard

New Zealand; 206 (45.1 overs)	v	Australia; 207/3 (34 overs)
Nathan McCullum 52 (76); Mitchell Johnson 4/33 (9.1 overs)		Shane Watson 62 (61); Hamish Bennett 2/63 (7 overs)

Australia won by 7 wickets
Vidarbha Cricket Association Stadium, Nagpur
Umpires: Kumar Dharmasena (SL) and Billy Doctrove (WI)
Player of the match: Mitchell Johnson (Aus)

- Australia won the toss and elected to field.

5 March 2011
14:30 (D/N)
Scorecard

Sri Lanka; 146/3 (32.5 overs)	v	Australia
Kumar Sangakkara 73* (102); Shaun Tait 1/23 (5 overs)

No result
R. Premadasa Stadium, Colombo
Umpires: Ian Gould (Eng) and Tony Hill (NZ)

- Sri Lanka won the toss and elected to bat.
- Rain stopped play at 17:30 local time

13 March 2011
14:30 (D/N)
Scorecard

Australia; 324/6 (50 overs)	v	Kenya; 264/6 (50 overs)
Michael Clarke 93 (80); Nehemiah Odhiambo 3/57 (10 overs)		Collins Obuya 98* (129); Shaun Tait 2/49 (8 overs)

Australia won by 60 runs
M. Chinnaswamy Stadium, Bangalore
Umpires: Asad Rauf (Pak) and Richard Kettleborough (Eng)
Player of the match: Collins Obuya (Ken)

- Australia won the toss and elected to bat.

16 March 2011
14:30 (D/N)
Scorecard

Canada; 211 (45.4 overs)	v	Australia; 212/3 (34.5 overs)
Hiral Patel 54 (45); Brett Lee 4/46 (8.4 overs)		Shane Watson 94 (90); John Davison 1/29 (4 overs)

Australia won by 7 wickets
M. Chinnaswamy Stadium, Bangalore
Umpires: Billy Bowden (NZ) and Amiesh Saheba (Ind)
Player of the match: Shane Watson (Aus)

- Canada won the toss and elected to bat.

19 March 2011
14:30 (D/N)
Scorecard

Australia; 176 (46.4 overs)	v	Pakistan; 178/6 (41 overs)
Brad Haddin 42 (80); Umar Gul 3/30 (7.4 overs)		Asad Shafiq 46 (81); Brett Lee 4/28 (8 overs)

Pakistan won by 4 wickets
R. Premadasa Stadium, Colombo
Umpires: Marais Erasmus (SA) and Tony Hill (NZ)
Player of the match: Umar Akmal (Pak)

- Australia won the toss and elected to bat.

Knockout stage

Quarter-final 2
24 March 2011
14:30 (D/N)
Scorecard

Australia; 260/6 (50 overs)	v	India; 261/5 (47.4 overs)
Ricky Ponting 104 (118); Yuvraj Singh 2/44 (10 overs)		Yuvraj Singh 57* (65); David Hussey 1/19 (5 overs)

India won by 5 wickets
Sardar Patel Stadium, Ahmedabad
Umpires: Marais Erasmus (SA) and Ian Gould (Eng)
Player of the match: Yuvraj Singh (Ind)

- Australia won the toss and elected to bat.

=== 2015 Cricket World Cup ===
Squad

- Michael Clarke(c)
- George Bailey
- Mitchell Starc
- Xavier Doherty
- David Warner
- Aaron Finch
- James Faulkner
- Pat Cummins
- Brad Haddin (wk)
- Mitchell Marsh
- Josh Hazlewood
- Mitchell Johnson
- Shane Watson
- Glenn Maxwell
- Steve Smith

Results

Event	Group stage							Quarter final	Semifinal	Final	Overall Result
Event	Opposition Result	Opposition Result	Opposition Result	Opposition Result	Opposition Result	Opposition Result	Rank	Opposition Result	Opposition Result	Opposition Result	Overall Result
2015	England; W by 111 runs	Bangladesh; No Result	New Zealand; L by 1 wicket	Afghanistan; W by 275 runs	Sri Lanka; W by 64 runs	Scotland; W by 7 wickets	2	Pakistan; W by 6 wickets	India; W by 95 runs	New Zealand; W by 7 wickets	Winners

Scorecards

Pool stage (Pool A)

14 February
14:30 (AEDT) (D/N)
Scorecard

Australia; 342/9 (50 overs)	v	England; 231 (41.5 overs)
Aaron Finch 135 (128); Steven Finn 5/71 (10 overs)		James Taylor 98* (90); Mitchell Marsh 5/33 (9 overs)

Australia won by 111 runs
MCG, Melbourne
Attendance: 84,336
Umpires: Aleem Dar (Pak) and Kumar Dharmasena (SL)
Player of the match: Aaron Finch (Aus)

- England won the toss and elected to field.
- Steven Finn took a hat-trick in this match dismissing Brad Haddin, Glenn Maxwell and Mitchell Johnson in three successive deliveries.
- The match ended when James Anderson was run out straight after James Taylor was given out lbw. As Taylor's decision was reviewed and overturned, the ICC later admitted that the ball should have been declared dead (according to Article 3.6a of Appendix 6 of the Decision Review System Playing Conditions), and so Anderson was incorrectly given out.

21 February
13:30 (AEST) (D/N)
Scorecard

Australia	v	Bangladesh

Match abandoned without a ball being bowled
The Gabba, Brisbane
Umpires: Kumar Dharmasena (SL) and Billy Bowden (NZ)

- No toss.
- Match called off at 16:42 due to heavy rain.
- This was only the second ever World Cup match abandoned without a ball being bowled.

28 February
14:00 (NZDT) (D/N)
Scorecard

Australia; 151 (32.2 overs)	v	New Zealand; 152/9 (23.1 overs)
Brad Haddin 43 (41); Trent Boult 5/27 (10 overs)		Brendon McCullum 50 (24); Mitchell Starc 6/28 (9 overs)

New Zealand won by 1 wicket
Eden Park, Auckland
Attendance: 40,053
Umpires: Marais Erasmus (SA) and Richard Illingworth (Eng)
Player of the match: Trent Boult (NZ)

- Australia won the toss and elected to bat.
- This is Australia's lowest score batting first in a World Cup game.
- Australia lost 8/26 during their innings, their worst collapse in ODI history.
- This match was played for the Chappell–Hadlee Trophy, the trophy which is usually the prize in any stand-alone ODI series between Australia and New Zealand.
- New Zealand qualified for the quarter-finals as a result of this match.

4 March
14:30 (AWST) (D/N)
Scorecard

Australia; 417/6 (50 overs)	v	Afghanistan; 142 (37.3 overs)
David Warner 178 (133); Shapoor Zadran 2/89 (10 overs)		Nawroz Mangal 33 (35); Mitchell Johnson 4/22 (7.3 overs)

Australia won by 275 runs
WACA Ground, Perth
Attendance: 12,710
Umpires: Kumar Dharmasena (SL) and Michael Gough (Eng)
Player of the match: David Warner (Aus)

- Afghanistan won the toss and elected to field.
- Australia's score of 417/6 is the second highest in World Cup history.
- Dawlat Zadran (Afg) became the third bowler in World Cup matches to concede 100 runs or more in an innings.
- Australia's victory margin of 275 runs is the third highest in World Cup history.

8 March
14:30 (AEDT) (D/N)
Scorecard

Australia; 376/9 (50 overs)	v	Sri Lanka; 312 (46.2 overs)
Glenn Maxwell 102 (53); Lasith Malinga 2/59 (10 overs)		Kumar Sangakkara 104 (107); James Faulkner 3/48 (9 overs)

Australia won by 64 runs
SCG, Sydney
Attendance: 39,951
Umpires: Aleem Dar (Pak) and Ian Gould (Eng)
Player of the match: Glenn Maxwell (Aus)

- Australia won the toss and elected to bat.
- Umpire Ian Gould stood in his 100th ODI match.
- Glenn Maxwell scored his maiden ODI century, the fastest by an Australian in a World Cup (51 balls) and the second-fastest overall.
- Tillakaratne Dilshan hit six fours off an over, bowled by Mitchell Johnson, the first time this has happened in World Cup history.
- Kumar Sangakkara became the second player to score 14,000 ODI runs, and scored a record third consecutive World Cup century.
- Dinesh Chandimal retired hurt, and did not return to complete his innings.
- New Zealand were confirmed as Pool A winners as a result of this match.
- Australia qualified for the quarter-finals as a result of this match.

14 March
14:30 (AEDT) (D/N)
Scorecard

Scotland; 130 (25.4 overs)	v	Australia; 133/3 (15.2 overs)
Matt Machan 40 (35); Mitchell Starc 4/14 (4.4 overs)		Michael Clarke 47 (47); Rob Taylor 1/29 (5 overs)

Australia won by 7 wickets
Bellerive Oval, Hobart
Attendance: 12,177
Umpires: Ian Gould (Eng) and Richard Illingworth (Eng)
Player of the match: Mitchell Starc (Aus)

- Australia won the toss and elected to field.

Knockout stage

Quarter-final 3
20 March
14:00 (ACDT) (D/N)
Scorecard

Pakistan; 213 (49.5 overs)	v	Australia; 216/4 (33.5 overs)
Haris Sohail 41 (57); Josh Hazlewood 4/35 (10 overs)		Steve Smith 65 (69); Wahab Riaz 2/54 (9 overs)

Australia won by 6 wickets
Adelaide Oval, Adelaide
Umpires: Kumar Dharmasena (SL) and Marais Erasmus (SA)
Player of the match: Josh Hazlewood (Aus)

- Pakistan won the toss and elected to bat.

Semi-final 2
26 March
14:30 (AEDT) (D/N)
Scorecard

Australia; 328/7 (50 overs)	v	India; 233 (46.5 overs)
Steve Smith 105 (93); Umesh Yadav 4/72 (9 overs)		MS Dhoni 65 (65); James Faulkner 3/59 (9 overs)

Australia won by 95 runs
Sydney Cricket Ground, Sydney
Umpires: Kumar Dharmasena (SL) and Richard Kettleborough (Eng)
Player of the match: Steve Smith (Aus)

- Australia won the toss and elected to bat.
- Australia qualified for the World Cup final for a record seventh time.
- Australia's total of 328/7 is the highest score in a World Cup semi-final.

Final
29 March 2015
14:30 (D/N)
Scorecard

New Zealand; 183 (45 overs)	v	Australia; 186/3 (33.1 overs)
Grant Elliott 83 (82); Mitchell Johnson 3/30 (9 overs)		Michael Clarke 74 (72); Matt Henry 2/46 (9.1 overs)

Australia won by 7 wickets
Melbourne Cricket Ground, Melbourne
Attendance: 93,013
Umpires: Kumar Dharmasena (SL) and Richard Kettleborough (Eng)
Player of the match: James Faulkner (Aus)

- New Zealand won the toss and elected to bat.
- Australia won the Cricket World Cup for the fifth time.

=== 2019 Cricket World Cup ===
Squad

- Aaron Finch(c)
- Usman Khawaja
- Mitchell Starc
- Marcus Stoinis
- David Warner
- Kane Richardson
- Nathan Lyon
- Pat Cummins
- Alex Carey (wk)
- Shaun Marsh
- Jason Behrendorff
- Nathan Coulter-Nile
- Adam Zampa
- Glenn Maxwell
- Steve Smith

Results

Event	League stage										Semifinal	Final	Overall Result
Event	Opposition Result	Opposition Result	Opposition Result	Opposition Result	Opposition Result	Opposition Result	Opposition Result	Opposition Result	Opposition Result	Rank	Opposition Result	Opposition Result	Overall Result
2019	Afghanistan; W by 7 wickets	West Indies; W by 15 runs	India; L by 36 runs	Pakistan; W by 41 runs	Sri Lanka; W by 87 runs	Bangladesh; W by 48 runs	England; W by 64 runs	New Zealand; W by 86 runs	South Africa; L by 10 runs	2	England; L by 8 wickets	Did not advance	Semi-finals

Scorecards

League stage

1 June 2019
13:30 (D/N)
Scorecard

Afghanistan; 207 (38.2 overs)	v	Australia; 209/3 (34.5 overs)
Najibullah Zadran 51 (49); Pat Cummins 3/40 (8.2 overs)		David Warner 89* (114); Gulbadin Naib 1/32 (5 overs)

Australia won by 7 wickets
County Ground, Bristol
Umpires: Aleem Dar (Pak) and Richard Illingworth (Eng)
Player of the match: David Warner (Aus)

- Afghanistan won the toss and elected to bat.
- Rashid Khan (Afg) played in his 100th international match, which included one game with a World XI side in May 2018.

6 June 2019
10:30
Scorecard

Australia; 288 (49 overs)	v	West Indies; 273/9 (50 overs)
Nathan Coulter-Nile 92 (60); Carlos Brathwaite 3/67 (10 overs)		Shai Hope 68 (105); Mitchell Starc 5/46 (10 overs)

Australia won by 15 runs
Trent Bridge, Nottingham
Umpires: Chris Gaffaney (NZ) and Ruchira Palliyaguruge (SL)
Player of the match: Nathan Coulter-Nile (Aus)

- West Indies won the toss and elected to field.
- This was the West Indies' 800th ODI.
- Pat Cummins (Aus) played in his 50th ODI.
- Nathan Coulter-Nile (Aus) made the highest score by a number 8 batsman in the World Cup.
- Chris Gayle (WI) scored his 1,000th run in the Cricket World Cup.
- Mitchell Starc (Aus) became the quickest bowler, in terms of number of matches, to take 150 wickets in ODIs (77).
- Andre Russell (WI) became the quickest batsman, in terms of balls faced, to score 1,000 run in ODIs (767).

9 June 2019
10:30
Scorecard

India; 352/5 (50 overs)	v	Australia; 316 (50 overs)
Shikhar Dhawan 117 (109); Marcus Stoinis 2/62 (7 overs)		Steve Smith 69 (70); Bhuvneshwar Kumar 3/50 (10 overs)

India won by 36 runs
The Oval, London
Umpires: Chris Gaffaney (NZ) and Ian Gould (Eng)
Player of the match: Shikhar Dhawan (Ind)

- India won the toss and elected to bat.
- Rohit Sharma (Ind) became the fastest batsman, in terms of innings, to score 2,000 runs against a single team in ODIs (37).
- This was the first time Australia had lost a run chase in a Cricket World Cup since losing to Pakistan at Leeds in 1999, ending a streak of 19 consecutive wins when batting second.

12 June 2019
10:30
Scorecard

Australia; 307 (49 overs)	v	Pakistan; 266 (45.4 overs)
David Warner 107 (111); Mohammad Amir 5/30 (10 overs)		Imam-ul-Haq 53 (75); Pat Cummins 3/33 (10 overs)

Australia won by 41 runs
County Ground, Taunton
Umpires: Nigel Llong (Eng) and Ruchira Palliyaguruge (SL)
Player of the match: David Warner (Aus)

- Pakistan won the toss and elected to field.
- Mohammad Amir (Pak) took his first five-wicket haul in ODIs.
- Nathan Coulter-Nile (Aus) took his 50th wicket in ODIs.

15 June 2019
10:30
Scorecard

Australia; 334/7 (50 overs)	v	Sri Lanka; 247 (45.5 overs)
Aaron Finch 153 (132); Dhananjaya de Silva 2/40 (8 overs)		Dimuth Karunaratne 97 (108); Mitchell Starc 4/55 (10 overs)

Australia won by 87 runs
The Oval, London
Umpires: Aleem Dar (Pak) and Richard Illingworth (Eng)
Player of the match: Aaron Finch (Aus)

- Sri Lanka won the toss and elected to field.

20 June 2019
10:30
Scorecard

Australia; 381/5 (50 overs)	v	Bangladesh; 333/8 (50 overs)
David Warner 166 (147); Soumya Sarkar 3/58 (8 overs)		Mushfiqur Rahim 102* (97); Marcus Stoinis 2/54 (8 overs)

Australia won by 48 runs
Trent Bridge, Nottingham
Umpires: Michael Gough (Eng) and Richard Kettleborough (Eng)
Player of the match: David Warner (Aus)

- Australia won the toss and elected to bat.
- David Warner (Aus) became the first batsman to score two 150+ scores in the Cricket World Cup.
- This was Australia's highest total against Bangladesh in ODIs.
- This was Bangladesh's highest total in ODIs.
- The 714 runs scored in the fixture was the highest match aggregate in a World Cup match.

25 June 2019
10:30
Scorecard

Australia; 285/7 (50 overs)	v	England; 221 (44.4 overs)
Aaron Finch 100 (116); Chris Woakes 2/46 (10 overs)		Ben Stokes 89 (115); Jason Behrendorff 5/44 (10 overs)

Australia won by 64 runs
Lord's, London
Umpires: Chris Gaffaney (NZ) and Sundaram Ravi (Ind)
Player of the match: Aaron Finch (Aus)

- England won the toss and elected to field.
- Jason Behrendorff (Aus) took his first five-wicket haul in ODIs.
- Australia qualified for the semi-finals as a result of this match.

29 June 2019
13:30 (D/N)
Scorecard

Australia; 243/9 (50 overs)	v	New Zealand; 157 (43.4 overs)
Usman Khawaja 88 (129); Trent Boult 4/51 (10 overs)		Kane Williamson 40 (51); Mitchell Starc 5/26 (9.4 overs)

Australia won by 86 runs
Lord's, London
Umpires: Richard Illingworth (Eng) and Joel Wilson (WI)
Player of the match: Alex Carey (Aus)

- Australia won the toss and elected to bat.
- David Warner (Aus) scored his 13,000th run in international cricket.
- Trent Boult (NZ) took the second hat-trick of this World Cup, and became the first New Zealand bowler to take a hat-trick in the World Cup.
- Kane Williamson (NZ) became the third-fastest batsman, in terms of innings, to score 6,000 runs in ODIs (139).
- Mitchell Starc (Aus) became the first bowler to take three five-wicket hauls at the Cricket World Cup.

6 July 2019
13:30 (D/N)
Scorecard

South Africa; 325/6 (50 overs)	v	Australia; 315 (49.5 overs)
Faf du Plessis 100 (94); Nathan Lyon 2/53 (10 overs)		David Warner 122 (117); Kagiso Rabada 3/56 (10 overs)

South Africa won by 10 runs
Old Trafford, Manchester
Umpires: Aleem Dar (Pak) and Kumar Dharmasena (SL)
Player of the match: Faf du Plessis (SA)

- South Africa won the toss and elected to bat.
- Imran Tahir (SA) played in his last ODI.
- This was the first time since 1992 that South Africa had beaten Australia in a World Cup match.

Knockout stage

Semi-final 2
11 July 2019
10:30
Scorecard

Australia; 223 (49 overs)	v	England; 226/2 (32.1 overs)
Steve Smith 85 (119); Chris Woakes 3/20 (8 overs)		Jason Roy 85 (65); Pat Cummins 1/34 (7 overs)

England won by 8 wickets
Edgbaston, Birmingham
Umpires: Kumar Dharmasena (SL) and Marais Erasmus (SA)
Player of the match: Chris Woakes (Eng)

- Australia won the toss and elected to bat.

=== 2023 Cricket World Cup ===
Squad

- Pat Cummins(c)
- Travis Head
- Mitchell Starc
- Marcus Stoinis
- David Warner
- Marnus Labuschagne
- Sean Abbott
- Josh Inglis
- Alex Carey (wk)
- Mitchell Marsh
- Josh Hazlewood
- Adam Zampa
- Glenn Maxwell
- Steve Smith

Results

Event	League stage										Semifinal	Final	Overall Result
Event	Opposition Result	Opposition Result	Opposition Result	Opposition Result	Opposition Result	Opposition Result	Opposition Result	Opposition Result	Opposition Result	Rank	Opposition Result	Opposition Result	Overall Result
2023	India; L by 6 wickets	South Africa; L by 134 runs	Sri Lanka; W by 5 wickets	Pakistan; W by 62 runs	Netherlands; W by 309 runs	New Zealand; W by 5 runs	England; W by 33 runs	Afghanistan; W by 3 wickets	Bangladesh; W by 8 wickets	3	South Africa; W by 3 wickets	India; W by 6 wickets	Winners

Scorecards

League stage

8 October 2023
14:00 (D/N)
Scorecard

Australia; 199 (49.3 overs)	v	India; 201/4 (41.2 overs)
Steve Smith 46 (71); Ravindra Jadeja 3/28 (10 overs)		KL Rahul 97* (115); Josh Hazlewood 3/38 (9 overs)

India won by 6 wickets
M. A. Chidambaram Stadium, Chennai
Umpires: Chris Gaffaney (NZ) and Richard Kettleborough (Eng)
Player of the match: KL Rahul (Ind)

- Australia won the toss and elected to bat.
- David Warner (Aus) broke the record held by Sachin Tendulkar and AB de Villiers (20 each) for the fastest to reach 1,000 runs in World Cups, in terms of innings (19).
- Mitchell Starc (Aus) broke Lasith Malinga's record (25) for the fastest to reach 50 wickets in World Cups, in terms of innings (19).

12 October 2023
14:00 (D/N)
Scorecard

South Africa; 311/7 (50 overs)	v	Australia; 177 (40.5 overs)
Quinton de Kock 109 (106); Glenn Maxwell 2/34 (10 overs)		Marnus Labuschagne 46 (74); Kagiso Rabada 3/33 (8 overs)

South Africa won by 134 runs
Ekana Cricket Stadium, Lucknow
Umpires: Richard Illingworth (Eng) and Joel Wilson (WI)
Player of the match: Quinton de Kock (SA)

- Australia won the toss and elected to field.
- This was Australia's largest defeat in World Cups surpassing their 118 run loss to India in 1983, in terms of runs (134).

15 June 2019
10:30
Scorecard

Australia; 334/7 (50 overs)	v	Sri Lanka; 247 (45.5 overs)
Aaron Finch 153 (132); Dhananjaya de Silva 2/40 (8 overs)		Dimuth Karunaratne 97 (108); Mitchell Starc 4/55 (10 overs)

Australia won by 87 runs
The Oval, London
Umpires: Aleem Dar (Pak) and Richard Illingworth (Eng)
Player of the match: Aaron Finch (Aus)

- Sri Lanka won the toss and elected to field.

16 October 2023
14:00 (D/N)
Scorecard

Sri Lanka; 209 (43.3 overs)	v	Australia; 215/5 (35.2 overs)
Kusal Perera 78 (82); Adam Zampa 4/47 (8 overs)		Josh Inglis 58 (59); Dilshan Madushanka 3/38 (9 overs)

Australia won by 5 wickets
Ekana Cricket Stadium, Lucknow
Umpires: Chris Gaffaney (NZ) and Joel Wilson (WI) (Note: Joel Wilson replaced Alex Wharf.)
Player of the match: Adam Zampa (Aus)

- Sri Lanka won the toss and elected to bat.

20 October 2023
14:00 (D/N)
Scorecard

Australia; 367/9 (50 overs)	v	Pakistan; 305 (45.3 overs)
David Warner 163 (124); Shaheen Afridi 5/54 (10 overs)		Imam-ul-Haq 70 (71); Adam Zampa 4/53 (10 overs)

Australia won by 62 runs
M. Chinnaswamy Stadium, Bengaluru
Umpires: Chris Brown (NZ) and Richard Illingworth (Eng)
Player of the match: David Warner (Aus)

- Pakistan won the toss and elected to field.
- Adam Zampa (Aus) took his 150th wicket in ODIs.

25 October 2023
14:00 (D/N)
Scorecard

Australia; 399/8 (50 overs)	v	Netherlands; 90 (21 overs)
Glenn Maxwell 106 (44); Logan van Beek 4/74 (10 overs)		Vikramjit Singh 25 (25); Adam Zampa 4/8 (3 overs)

Australia won by 309 runs
Arun Jaitley Cricket Stadium, Delhi
Umpires: Michael Gough (Eng) and Sharfuddoula (Ban)
Player of the match: Glenn Maxwell (Aus)

- Australia won the toss and elected to bat.
- Glenn Maxwell (Aus) broke Aiden Markram's record for the fastest century in World Cup history, in terms of balls faced (40).
- Australia's recorded the highest margin of victory in World Cup history and second overall by any team, in terms of runs (309), surpassing their 275-run win against Afghanistan in 2015.

28 October 2023
10:30
Scorecard

Australia; 388 (49.2 overs)	v	New Zealand; 383/9 (50 overs)
Travis Head 109 (67); Glenn Phillips 3/37 (10 overs)		Rachin Ravindra 116 (89); Adam Zampa 3/74 (10 overs)

Australia won by 5 runs
Himachal Pradesh Cricket Association Stadium, Dharamshala
Umpires: Marais Erasmus (SA) and Sharfuddoula (Ban)
Player of the match: Travis Head (Aus)

- New Zealand won the toss and elected to field.
- The 771 runs scored in the fixture is the highest match aggregate in a World Cup match, surpassing South Africa and Sri Lanka's 754 runs from 21 days prior.

4 November 2023
14:00 (D/N)
Scorecard

Australia; 286 (49.3 overs)	v	England; 253 (48.1 overs)
Marnus Labuschagne 71 (83); Chris Woakes 4/54 (9.3 overs)		Ben Stokes 64 (90); Adam Zampa 3/21 (10 overs)

Australia won by 33 runs
Narendra Modi Stadium, Ahmedabad
Umpires: Marais Erasmus (SA) and Chris Gaffaney (NZ)
Player of the match: Adam Zampa (Aus)

- England won the toss and elected to field.

7 November 2023
14:00 (D/N)
Scorecard

Afghanistan; 291/5 (50 overs)	v	Australia; 293/7 (46.5 overs)
Ibrahim Zadran 129* (143); Josh Hazlewood 2/39 (9 overs)		Glenn Maxwell 201* (128); Rashid Khan 2/44 (10 overs)

Australia won by 3 wickets
Wankhede Stadium, Mumbai
Umpires: Michael Gough (Eng) and Alex Wharf (Eng)
Player of the match: Glenn Maxwell (Aus)

- Afghanistan won the toss and elected to bat.
- Glenn Maxwell's 201 was the highest individual score by an Australian cricketer, surpassing Shane Watson's 185, and for a batter at number three or lower, surpassing Charles Coventry's (Zim) 194, in ODIs.
- The 202-run stand between Glenn Maxwell and Pat Cummins (Aus) was the highest 8th wicket partnership in ODIs, surpassing Andrew Hall and Justin Kemp's 138 against India in 2006.
- Australia qualified for the semi-finals as a result of this match.

11 November 2023
10:30
Scorecard

Bangladesh; 306/8 (50 overs)	v	Australia; 307/2 (44.4 overs)
Towhid Hridoy 74 (79); Adam Zampa 2/32 (10 overs)		Mitchell Marsh 177* (132); Taskin Ahmed 1/61 (10 overs)

Australia won by 8 wickets
Maharashtra Cricket Association Stadium, Pune
Umpires: Marais Erasmus (SA) and Ahsan Raza (Pak)
Player of the match: Mitchell Marsh (Aus)

- Australia won the toss and elected to field.
- This was the first time that Australia had successfully chased down a target of 300 or above in the World Cups.

Knockout stage

Semi-final 2
16 November 2023
14:00 (D/N)
Scorecard

South Africa; 212 (49.4 overs)	v	Australia; 215/7 (47.2 overs)
David Miller 101 (116); Mitchell Starc 3/34 (10 overs)		Travis Head 62 (48); Tabraiz Shamsi 2/42 (10 overs)

Australia won by 3 wickets
Eden Gardens, Kolkata
Umpires: Richard Kettleborough (Eng) and Nitin Menon (Ind)
Player of the match: Travis Head (Aus)

- South Africa won the toss and elected to bat.
- As a result, Australia qualified for the finals of the World Cup for the eighth time after 1975, 1987, 1996, 1999, 2003, 2007 and 2015.

Final
19 November 2023
14:00 (D/N)
Scorecard

India; 240 (50 overs)	v	Australia; 241/4 (43 overs)
KL Rahul 66 (107); Mitchell Starc 3/55 (10 overs)		Travis Head 137 (120); Jasprit Bumrah 2/43 (9 overs)

Australia won by 6 Wickets
Narendra Modi Stadium, Ahmedabad
Umpires: Richard Illingworth (Eng) and Richard Kettleborough (Eng)
Player of the match: Travis Head (Aus)

- Australia won the toss and elected to field.
- Australia won their record sixth World Cup title.

Summary

Australia started its 2023 ICC Men's Cricket World Cup campaign with two successive defeats – in its opening match against India played on October 8, 2023, and also on its second group match against South Africa played on October 12, 2023. It however defeated Sri Lanka in its third group match of the 2023 cricket world cup played on October 16, 2023. In its 4th group match, Australia – helped by David Warner and Mitchell Marsh's record opening partnership of 259 runs, playing against Pakistan ended their innings with 367 runs in 50 overs losing 9 wickets. Australian bowlers later bowled out Pakistan for 305 runs, thus winning the match by 62 runs. While playing against Pakistan on October 20, 2023, in the 2023 World Cup Group Match at the M. Chinnaswamy Stadium in Bengaluru, Warner and Marsh went past Brad Haddin and Shane Watson's 183 against Canada at the same venue on March 16 in the 2011 Cricket World Cup.

== Records and statistics ==
=== Team records ===
Highest innings totals

Score	Opponent	Venue	Season
417/6 (50 overs)	Afghanistan	WACA, Perth	2015
399/8 (50 overs)	Netherlands	Delhi	2023
388/10 (49.2 overs)	New Zealand	Dharamshala	2023
381/5 (50 overs)	Bangladesh	Nottingham	2019
377/6 (50 overs)	South Africa	Basseterre	2007
Last updated: 19 November 2023

=== Most appearances ===
This list consists players with most number of matches at the Cricket World Cup. Ricky Ponting played a total of 46 World Cup matches and captained the team in 29 of them — the highest by an Australian captain.

Matches	Player	Period
46	Ricky Ponting	1996–2011
39	Glenn McGrath	1996–2007
34	Steve Smith	2011–2023
33	Steve Waugh	1987–1999
31	Adam Gilchrist	1999–2007
Last updated: 19 November 2023

=== Batting statistics ===
Most runs

Runs	Player	Mat	Inn	HS	Avg	100s	50s	Period
1743	Ricky Ponting	46	42	140*	45.86	5	6	1996–2011
1527	David Warner	29	29	178	56.55	6	5	2015–2023
1136	Steve Smith	34	30	105	42.07	1	10	2011–2023
1085	Adam Gilchrist	31	31	149	36.16	1	8	1999–2007
1004	Mark Waugh	22	22	130	52.84	4	4	1992–1999
Last updated: 19 November 2023

Highest partnerships

Runs	Players	Opposition	Venue	Season
260 (2nd wicket)	David Warner (170) & Steve Smith (81)	v Afghanistan	WACA, Perth	2015
259 (1st wicket)	David Warner (124) & Mitchell Marsh (121)	v Pakistan	Bengaluru	2023
234* (3rd wicket)	Ricky Ponting (140) & Damien Martyn (88)	v India	Johannesburg	2003
207 (3rd wicket)	Steve Waugh (118) & Mark Waugh (82)	v Kenya	Visakhapatnam	1996
204 (4th wicket)	Brad Hodge (123) & Michael Clarke (71)	v Netherlands	Basseterre	2007
Last updated: 19 November 2023

=== Bowling statistics ===
Most wickets

Wickets	Player	Matches	Avg.	Econ.	BBI	4W	5W	Period
71	Glenn McGrath	39	18.19	3.96	7/15	0	2	1996–2007
65	Mitchell Starc	28	19.29	5.15	6/28	3	3	2015–2023
35	Brett Lee	17	17.97	4.57	5/42	2	1	2003–2011
34	Brad Hogg	21	19.23	4.12	4/27	2	0	2003–2007
34	Shaun Tait	18	21.50	5.35	4/39	1	0	2007–2011
34	Pat Cummins	23	30.05	5.41	3/33	1	0	2015–2023
Last updated: 19 November 2023
