= Khairpur cricket team =

Cricket team

Khairpur cricket team, from the town of Khairpur, Pakistan, in the district of Khairpur in the north of Sindh province, played in the Pakistan domestic first-class cricket competitions between 1958–59 and 1973–74. The team no longer plays first-class cricket.

== First-class history ==
Khairpur made their debut in the 1958–59 Quaid-i-Azam Trophy, playing Quetta in Sukkur. Khairpur won a low-scoring match by four wickets. Tahir Ali took 5 for 36 and 2 for 27, and Iqbal Sheikh took 3 for 31 and 5 for 23. Khairpur lost their next match and drew their third.

In 1959–60 they played only one match, losing to Hyderabad after being dismissed for 57, which was their lowest-ever total, in the first innings. In 1960–61 they formed a combined team with Hyderabad, which competed in the Ayub Trophy as Hyderabad-Khairpur, losing one match and drawing the other.

Resuming as an independent entity in the Quaid-i-Azam Trophy, Khairpur won their first match in 1961–62, beating Bahawalpur by 8 runs in another low-scoring match. Faqir Aizazuddin, the captain, top-scored in each innings with 29 and 53, and Tahir Ali took 3 for 24 and 4 for 31. Khairpur lost their next two matches. In the match against Lahore B they reached 150 for the first time, eventually being dismissed for 242.

They began 1962–63 with their highest-ever total, 321, against Multan, although in the end they narrowly escaped with a draw. Once again Aizazuddin top-scored in each innings, making 89 and 24, as well as taking three wickets. They won their next match, against Bahawalpur, by two wickets, thanks to Aizazuddin, who made 31 and 101 (Khairpur's first century), and Abdul Aziz, who took 7 for 66 and 5 for 97.

They lost their next four matches over three seasons by large margins. Their only appearance in 1966–67 was in a combined Hyderabad-Khairpur-Quetta team, which lost its only match to East Pakistan in the Ayub Trophy.

In 1967–68 Khairpur played one match, a draw. In 1968–69 they began with a 200-run victory over Quetta in Sukkur. Aged only 12 years and seven months, and batting at number eight, Mohammad Akram made 111 in the first innings on his first-class debut. Tahir Ali took 6 for 44 and 4 for 51. In their next match they were trounced by Karachi, for whom Pervez Sajjad took 15 wickets in the match for 112 runs.

Khairpur began 1969–70 with what was to be their last victory, and their only innings victory, when they beat Hyderabad Whites in Sukkur by an innings and 29 runs. Tahir Ali took 6 for 38 and 4 for 39, and Abdul Aziz took 4 for 27 and 5 for 68. They lost their three other matches that season by an innings.

Khairpur's last 10 first-class matches resulted in eight losses by large margins and two drawn matches that ended with Khairpur nine wickets down in their second innings and a long way short of their target. But there were still some notable individual performances. Zafar Mahmood made 106 and 39 in the draw against Karachi Whites in 1971–72. In Khairpur's final first-class match, in 1973–74, Mohammad Akram, still only 17 years old but now batting at number three, top-scored in each innings with 39 and 102, although Khairpur still lost by an innings to Commerce Bank.

In their 28 first-class matches between December 1958 and December 1973 (not counting the three by combined teams) Khairpur won five, lost 17 and drew six.

Several Khairpur players later played for the neighbouring team of Sukkur when it assumed first-class status in the 1974–75 season.

== Notable performances ==
Faqir Aizazuddin captained Khairpur in nine matches in the 1960s, three of which they won. He also played for a number of other teams, and toured England with Pakistan in 1967, but did not play any Tests. For Khairpur he made 595 runs at an average of 29.75, and took 12 wickets at 38.25. Zafar Mahmood was Khairpur's leading run-scorer, with 623 runs at 27.08 in 13 matches. Mohammad Akram made 464 runs at 27.29, and scored two of Khairpur's four centuries; he later played a few matches for Sukkur during its period as a first-class team between 1974 and 1987.

Tahir Ali played 24 matches for Khairpur, taking 98 wickets at an average of 19.64 with his left-arm spin and making 437 runs at 12.85, a useful contribution in a weak batting side. When a Khairpur Commissioner's XI played a first-class friendly match in Sukkur in 1967–68, he was the only Khairpur player selected; most of the others were Test players. He was Khairpur's leading wicket-taker. In 13 matches for Khairpur, Abdul Aziz took 60 wickets at 23.96 with his off-spin.

== Notable cricketers ==
- Faqir Aizazuddin
- Mohammad Akram (cricketer, born 1956)
- Razaullah Khan
- Naseer Malik
- Ahmed Mustafa
- Shakoor Rana

== Current status ==
The team has continued to play at sub-first-class level. Currently it takes part in the Inter-District Senior Tournament, a three-day national competition.

== Grounds ==
Khairpur has never played its matches in the town of Khairpur. During its first-class period it played three matches at the Municipal Stadium in Sukkur, about 30 kilometres to the north, winning all three.

== Other sources ==
- Wisden Cricketers' Almanack 1960 to 1974
