= Faqir Aizazuddin =

Pakistani cricketer

Personal information
- Full name: Faqir Syed Aizazuddin
- Born: 17 August 1935; Lahore, Pakistan
- Died: 8 May 2017 (aged 81); Karachi, Pakistan
- Batting: Right-handed
- Bowling: Right-arm leg-spin

Domestic team information
- Years: Team
- 1957: Cambridge University
- 1959–60 to 1963–64, 1968–69: Khairpur
- 1964–65, 1971–72: Karachi Whites

Career statistics
Competition	First-class
Matches	43
Runs scored	1872
Batting average	24.96
100s/50s	3/8
Top score	187
Balls bowled	1316
Wickets	19
Bowling average	40.05
5 wickets in innings	–
10 wickets in match	–
Best bowling	4/36
Catches/stumpings	13/–
- Source: Cricket Archive, 4 December 2013

Faqir Syed Aizazuddin (17 August 1935 – 8 May 2017), also known as Aizaz Faqir, Fakir Aizazuddin and S. A. V. Fakir, was a Pakistani cricketer.

== Early career ==
Aizazuddin made his first-class debut during his five years of study at Cambridge University. In the 1957 season, when the university side was looking for opening batsmen, he was one of numerous batsmen tried in that position, but in five games he made only 61 runs and took one wicket with his leg-spin, and he lost his place.

When he returned to Pakistan he began playing for Khairpur, with one appearance in 1959–60. He captained Khairpur in the Quaid-i-Azam Trophy in 1961–62, beginning the season by taking three wickets and top-scoring in each innings for Khairpur against Bahawalpur – 29 and 53 in a low-scoring match that Khairpur won by eight runs. It was Khairpur's first victory in first-class competition.

In January 1962 he was selected for a Combined XI of mostly young cricketers to play against the touring MCC in Bahawalpur. In a low-scoring match ruined by rain he made the second-top score of 20 in the Combined XI's total of 162. He then captained South Zone in two matches in the Ayub Trophy. In the first match his 4 for 36 played a part in victory over Pakistan Education Board, while in the second he scored his first century, 102, batting at number three in the second innings in a loss to Karachi.

Captaining the side again in Khairpur's three matches in the Quaid-i-Azam Trophy in 1962–63, Aizazuddin made 89 (top score), 24 (top score), 31 (second-top score), 101 (top score in a two-wicket victory over Bahawalpur), 34 (second-top score) and 10. He toured England with the Pakistan Eaglets, a team of promising young players, in 1963, heading the first-class averages with 280 runs at 56.00, including 187 in an innings victory over Cambridge University, his highest first-class score, made in six hours.

== Playing for Pakistan ==
When a Commonwealth XI of international cricketers toured Pakistan in 1963–64 Aizazuddin played in the first match for a BCCP XI, making 0 and 47, then played in all three unofficial Test matches, making 72, 16, 21 and 62 not out, opening the batting against a pace attack of Charlie Griffith and Chester Watson.

He made the brief tour of Ceylon with Pakistan A in August 1964, but scored only 14 runs in the two low-scoring matches lost to the Ceylon teams, where Javed Burki twice made 62 and no other batsman on either side reached 40. He played for a strong Pakistan XI in a friendly match against Railways in October that year but made only 6 and 3, and was not selected for the Pakistan tour to Australia and New Zealand later that year.

He played one match for Karachi Whites in 1964–65 and another in 1965–66 (as captain), and none in 1966–67. Nevertheless, he toured England with the Pakistan team in 1967, but in nine games as an opening batsman he made only 267 runs at 17.80, with 74 against Minor Counties (the top score on either side) his best score. It turned out to be his last first-class fifty. Despite the Test team's weakness in opening, his form was too poor to put him into consideration.

== Later career ==
Aizazuddin returned to Khairpur to captain them in two matches in 1968–69, then returned to Karachi Whites as captain in three matches in 1971–72, but he never regained his earlier form as an opener.

He was later involved in cricket administration. He managed the Pakistan tour of New Zealand in 2001, an unsuccessful, controversial tour in which "the team's erratic form made it too easy for a now suspicious world to ask questions". In his tour report Aizazuddin was highly critical of the attitude and behaviour of many of the players.
