= Pakistan Combined Schools =

The Pakistan Combined Schools cricket team played one first-class match in the 1954–55 season, against the touring Indian Test team. It is the only occasion in the history of cricket when a schools team has been accorded first-class status.

== The match ==
The match, played at the Karachi Gymkhana Ground from 22 to 24 February 1955, was the final match of the tour before the Fifth Test. The Indians batted first and declared on the second day at 352 for 5. Pakistan Combined Schools replied with 267 for 9 declared, of which the captain, Hanif Mohammad, scored 163. In the brief period remaining on the third and final day, the Indians made 36 for 2.

== The team ==
- Hanif Mohammad (aged 20) (captain)
- Pervez Akhtar (age unknown)
- Anwar Elahi (age 17 to 19)
- Ghaffar Khan (14)
- Wallis Mathias (19)
- Mohammad Munaf (19)
- Ahmed Mustafa (10)
- Khalil Rana (14)
- Abdur Rasheed (age unknown)
- Salimuddin (12)
- Ziaullah (18)

Hanif Mohammad had already played all 13 of Pakistan's Test matches. Two other team members, Wallis Mathias and Mohammad Munaf, later played Test cricket. All of the team had subsequent first-class careers.

Ahmed Mustafa, who was supposedly only 10 years old at the time of the match, later revealed that he was "actually about 15". There may be other such discrepancies between players' supposed and actual ages.

== Later match ==
Pakistan Combined Schools also played a two-day match in 1955–56 against the MCC. It too was drawn. Five of the team from the first match also played in this match.
