= Ahmed Mustafa =

Pakistani cricketer (1944–2013)

Personal information
- Born: 7 March 1944; Lucknow, India
- Died: 10 August 2013 (aged 69); Karachi, Pakistan
- Batting: Right-handed
- Bowling: Right-arm medium

Domestic team information
- Years: Team
- 1956-70: Karachi
- 1959-60: Khairpur

Career statistics
Competition	First-class
Matches	16
Runs scored	504
Batting average	24.00
100s/50s	1/3
Top score	110
Balls bowled	108
Wickets	3
Bowling average	14.00
5 wickets in innings	0
10 wickets in match	0
Best bowling	3/15
Catches/stumpings	10/–
- Source: ESPNcricinfo, 31 May 2016

Ahmed Mustafa (7 March 1944 – 10 August 2013) was a Pakistani cricketer in the 1950s and 1960s who later became a prominent coach. At 10 years 352 days, Ahmed Mustafa was, officially at least, the youngest-ever first-class cricketer.

== Playing career ==
Mustafa was one of the schoolboys who made their first-class debuts for Pakistan Combined Schools against the touring Indian Test team in February 1955. Mustafa's stated birth date was 7 March 1944, which would have made him only 10 years old during the match, and the youngest first-class cricketer of all time, but in later life he revealed that he had been "actually about 15".

He played first-class cricket in Pakistan irregularly until 1969–70, but his career was hampered by injuries sustained in a car accident. He scored one century, 110 for Karachi C against Sind A in 1957–58, when he added 165 for the fifth wicket with Salimuddin, one of his former teammates in the Pakistan Combined Schools team. He toured the UK and Ireland with the Pakistan Eaglets in 1959, and opened the batting for the Karachi team that won the Ayub Trophy in 1964–65.

== Coaching career ==
Mustafa founded Pakistan's first cricket academy in 1987, the Cricket Coaching Centre in Karachi. With financial support from friends and with many past players willing to lend their services to coach, he provided free coaching to young players for more than 20 years until deteriorating health forced him to retire. He received the ICC Centenary Medal for volunteers in 2010. His pupils included the Test players Azam Khan, Faisal Iqbal and Owais Shah. In 2003 the Pakistan Cricket Board allowed the Cricket Coaching Centre to move to the National Stadium, Karachi and use the PCB infrastructure and facilities there.
