= Mohammad Akram (Sindh cricketer) =

Pakistani cricketer (born 1956)

Personal information
- Born: 12 April 1956; Nawabshah, Sindh, Pakistan
- Batting: Right-handed
- Bowling: Right-arm medium-fast

Domestic team information
- Years: Team
- 1968–69 to 1973–74: Khairpur
- 1973–74: Sind
- 1974–75 to 1984–85: Sukkur
- 1975–76: Pakistan Universities

Career statistics
| Competition | First-class |
|---|---|
| Matches | 14 |
| Runs scored | 634 |
| Batting average | 25.36 |
| 100s/50s | 2/1 |
| Top score | 111 |
| Balls bowled | 479 |
| Wickets | 6 |
| Bowling average | 41.00 |
| 5 wickets in innings | 0 |
| 10 wickets in match | 0 |
| Best bowling | 2/78 |
| Catches/stumpings | 13/– |
- Source: Cricinfo, 4 December 2013

Mohammad Akram (born 12 April 1956) is a Pakistani former cricketer who made a first-class century at the age of 12 years and 217 days. If his birthdate is correct – The Association of Cricket Statisticians and Historians advises that birthdates from Pakistan and Bangladesh "should be treated with appropriate caution" – he is the youngest player in history to score a first-class century.

== Playing for Khairpur ==
On 15 November 1968, making his first-class debut in the Quaid-e-Azam Trophy, Akram scored 111 in the first innings for Khairpur against Quetta in Sukkur. He went to the crease with the score at 98 for 6, completed his century just before stumps on the first day, then was last man out early on the second day. Khairpur made 311, and went on to win the match by 200 runs. Nobody else scored a century.

Akram was run out for a duck in the second innings, beginning a run of low first-class scores (0, 6, 0, 4, 0, 15, 1, 5, 16) that ended when, batting at number three, he top-scored for Khairpur with 59 out of a total of 132 in the second innings against Rawalpindi Blues in the Ayub Trophy in 1969–70.

In 1973–74, in a BCCP Patron's Trophy match against Commerce Bank, Akram top-scored in each innings with 33 and 102 in an innings defeat. He also took three catches and opened the bowling. It was Khairpur's last first-class match.

Later that season he represented Sind against Baluchistan in the Quaid-e-Azam Trophy. It was the match in which Aftab Baloch scored 428 and Sind won by an innings and 575 runs. Akram, going to the crease with the score at 828 for 5, was one of Sind's few failures with the bat, but he took the last wicket of the match. In his brief innings, the 17-year-old Akram partnered the 16-year-old future Test batsman Javed Miandad, who was proceeding towards his maiden first-class century.

== Playing for Sukkur ==
The towns of Khairpur and Sukkur are about 30 kilometres apart in northern Sindh province, so when Sukkur made their first-class debut in 1974–75 they effectively replaced Khairpur in first-class cricket, and Akram was one of several former Khairpur players who appeared for the new team. He captained Sukkur in their match against Hyderabad in the Sikandar Ali Bhutto Cup in 1975–76, although he was still only 19. Later that season he played two matches for Pakistan Universities in the BCCP Patron's Trophy.

After a gap of nine years Akram played his last first-class match, captaining Sukkur to an innings thrashing by Karachi Whites in 1984–85. It was the only match he played after turning 20.
