= Sukkur cricket team =

Cricket team

Sukkur cricket team, from the town of Sukkur, in the district of Sukkur in the north of Sindh province, played in the Pakistan domestic first-class cricket competitions between 1974–75 and 1986–87. The team no longer plays first-class cricket.

== First-class history ==
=== 1970s ===
Sukkur made their debut with a game against the Public Works Department in the 1974-75 BCCP Patron's Trophy, losing by 427 runs after being dismissed for 49 and 174. Nine of the team, and several other players who represented Sukkur in the 1970s, had played for the neighbouring Khairpur team before it lost its first-class status after the 1973–74 season.

They played three games in 1975–76, losing them all but less overwhelmingly than in their debut match. In the match against Hyderabad they took a first-innings lead, but lost by seven wickets. Sharif Kaka made 92 and 45 and took 6 for 52 in the first innings, which remained Sukkur's best-ever bowling figures.

Sukkur's only victory came in the first game of the 1976–77 season, in the short-lived Sikander Ali Bhutto Cup, when they beat Hyderabad at Gama Stadium, Mirpur Khas, by seven wickets. Aslam Jafri made 104 and 49, top-scoring in each innings in a low-scoring match. Ashiq Hussain took 3 for 38 and 5 for 38. Sukkur's total of 228 in the first innings was the first time they had reached 200, in their fifth match.

In Sukkur's next match, United Bank dismissed them for 28 in the second innings, their lowest-ever total. In this match and their next two in 1976-77 and 1977-78 Sukkur made a total of only 390 runs in six completed innings while their opponents made 892 runs for the loss of 28 wickets. After 1977-78 they lost their first-class status for five seasons.

They had played eight matches, for one win and seven losses.

=== 1980s ===
Sukkur was one of a number of teams upgraded to first-class status for the expanded BCCP Patron's Trophy in 1983–84. They played four matches during the season, drawing three and losing one. Rizwan Yousuf made Sukkur's highest-ever score of 116 not out in the drawn match against Quetta. As the match against Lahore City Blues proceeded towards a tame draw, Sukkur, having trailed on the first innings by 191 runs, registered their highest-ever total, 312 for five, scored off 124 overs.

Sukkur played four more matches over the next two seasons, drawing one and losing three. In what proved to be their last first-class match, against Hyderabad in 1985–86, Israr Ahmed made his first-class debut, scoring 108 in the first innings total of 209. It was his only first-class match.

Sukkur were scheduled to compete in the President's Cup in 1986–87, but withdrew shortly before the competition began. They have not played first-class cricket since.

In the 1980s Sukkur played eight times for four draws and four losses. In all they played 16 first-class matches for one win, 11 losses and four draws.

== Notable performances ==
Sharif Kaka was Sukkur's highest scorer, with 333 runs at an average of 25.61 in the 1970s team. The highest wicket-taker was Ashiq Hussain, also in the 1970s, with 23 wickets at 23.82. There were nine captains.

== Current status ==
The team has continued to play at sub-first-class level. Currently it takes part in the Inter-District Senior Tournament, a three-day national competition.

== Grounds ==
Sukkur played three first-class home games, all at the Municipal Stadium in Sukkur. They currently play their home matches at the PCB Academy Ground, Sukkur.

== Notable players ==
- Mohammad Akram (cricketer, born 1956)

== Other sources ==
- Wisden Cricketers' Almanack 1976 to 1988
