= Andrew Zesers =

Australian cricketer b. 1967

Personal information
- Full name: Andris Karlis Zesers
- Born: 11 March 1967 (age 59); Adelaide, South Australia, Australia
- Batting: Right-handed
- Bowling: Right-arm medium-fast
- Role: Bowler

International information
- National side: Australia
- ODI debut: 22 October 1987 v India
- Last ODI: 27 October 1987 v New Zealand

Domestic team information
- Years: Team
- 1984/85–1989/90: South Australia

Career statistics
Competition	ODI	FC	LA
Matches	2	45	15
Runs scored	10	763	15
Batting average	–	16.58	15.00
100s/50s	0/0	0/2	0/0
Top score	8*	85	8*
Balls bowled	90	11,189	816
Wickets	1	142	10
Bowling average	74.00	30.44	54.50
5 wickets in innings	0	4	0
10 wickets in match	0	0	0
Best bowling	1/37	7/67	2/18
Catches/stumpings	1/–	14/–	5/–
Medal record
Men's Cricket
Representing Australia
ICC Cricket World Cup
Winner	1987 India and Pakistan
- Source: CricInfo, 28 August 2011

Andris Karlis Zesers (born 11 March 1967) is a former Australian cricketer. He played as a right-arm specialist fast bowler.

The son of a Latvian-born construction worker, Zesers ascended quickly to first-class ranks. He was selected at the age of 17 years and 256 days to represent South Australia against Tasmania in late 1984, whilst still a student at Marden High School after less than a year in grade cricket. He was a tall fast bowler, and demonstrated all-round potential when he scored 85 and took 6/76 in a Sheffield Shield match against Victoria in his debut season. This earned him selection on the 1984–85 Australian Under-19 team to tour Sri Lanka and India. His efforts in claiming 11 wickets, at an average of just 12, put him into contention for higher honours in the limited-overs format. By the age of 21, Zesers had collected more than 100 first-class wickets, the only person to have achieved this feat.

He was subsequently selected for the 1987 Cricket World Cup in India, with Australia winning the tournament and claiming its first world title. Zesers made his ODI debut against India in the group phase in Delhi, taking 0/37 as India reached 8/289. In Australia's run-chase, he made two not out batting at number 10 as Australia was bowled out for 233. Zesers played his second match against New Zealand in Chandigarh, and scored eight not out from four balls after coming in during the final overs of Australia's innings. He took his only international wicket in dismissing John Wright, but after conceding 37 runs in just six overs, he was dropped and never again represented his country.

A chronic shoulder injury ended his career in 1989–90, at the age of just 23, having played 45 first-class matches and taken 142 wickets at an average of 30.44 with four five-wicket hauls, and having scored 763 runs at 16.58 with two half-centuries. His bowling was characterised by a tendency to attack the stumps, with 36% of his wickets coming through either bowling the batsman out or trapping them leg before wicket.
