= Naseer Malik =

Pakistani cricketer (1950–1999)

Personal information
- Full name: Naseer Ahmed Malik
- Born: 1 February 1950; Lyallpur, Punjab, Pakistan
- Died: 1 August 1999 (aged 49); Lahore, Punjab, Pakistan
- Batting: Right-handed
- Bowling: Right-arm fast-medium
- Role: Bowler

International information
- National side: Pakistan (1975)
- ODI debut (cap 14): 7 June 1975 v Australia
- Last ODI: 14 June 1975 v Sri Lanka

Domestic team information
- Years: Team
- Khairpur
- National Bank of Pakistan
- Sind
- Karachi Whites

Career statistics
Competition	ODI	First-class	List A
Matches	3	72	10
Runs scored	0	765	7
Batting average	–	11.08	7.00
100s/50s	0/0	0/2	0/0
Top score	0*	55	7*
Balls bowled	180	9759	460
Wickets	5	203	7
Bowling average	19.60	24.87	42.00
5 wickets in innings	0	15	0
10 wickets in match	0	0	0
Best bowling	2/37	8/49	2/37
Catches/stumpings	0/–	46/–	3/–
- Source: ESPNCricinfo, 5 July 2026

Naseer Ahmed Malik (1 February 1950 – 1 August 1999) was a Pakistani cricketer. Malik was a right-handed batsman who bowled right-arm fast-medium. He was born in Lyallpur (now Faisalabad), Punjab, and died in Lahore.

Malik made his first-class debut for Khairpur in the 1969/70 Pakistani season. He made his List A debut for National Bank of Pakistan against Pakistan International Airlines in the semi-final of the Servis Cup on 20 December 1974, and made his ODI debut for Pakistan against Australia at Headingley in the inaugural 1975 Cricket World Cup on 7 June 1975.

During his domestic career, Malik represented Khairpur, National Bank of Pakistan, Sind and Karachi Whites. He also played for Pakistan Under-25s, Pakistanis, National Bank of Pakistan A, the BCCP Patron's XI and ZA Bhutto's XI.

Malik established himself as a successful fast bowler in domestic cricket. He took 203 wickets in first-class cricket, with 121 of them coming for National Bank of Pakistan at an average of 22.12, including a best of 8 wickets for 49 runs. He also took 21 first-class wickets for Khairpur and 32 for Sind.

In Pakistan's second match of the 1975 World Cup, Malik dismissed Rohan Kanhai during a narrow defeat to the West Indies. He played three ODIs for Pakistan, all during the 1975 World Cup, taking five wickets at an average of 19.60.
