= Chappell–Hadlee Trophy =

International cricket series

- Sir Richard Hadlee (left) & Ian Chappell (right) holding the Chappell–Hadlee Trophy
- Countries: Australia; New Zealand
- Administrator: Cricket Australia; New Zealand Cricket
- Format: ODI & T20I
- First edition: 2004–05 (Australia)
- Latest edition: 2025–26 (New Zealand)
- Tournament format: series
- Number of teams: 2
- Current champion: Australia (9th title)
- Most successful: Australia (9 titles)
- Most runs: (New Zealand) Brendon McCullum (809)
- Most wickets: (New Zealand) Trent Boult (33)

The Chappell–Hadlee Trophy in cricket is a One Day International & Twenty20 International cricket series between Australia and New Zealand. It is named after legendary cricketing families from the two countries: the Chappell brothers (Ian, Gregory, and Trevor) of Australia, and Walter Hadlee and his three sons (Barry, Dayle and Sir Richard) of New Zealand. Australia have recorded eight series wins to New Zealand's four.

In February 2024, both Cricket Australia (CA) and New Zealand Cricket (NZC) announced that, the trophy will be contested over both ODI and T20I formats in order to increase its exposure and profile. The change also meant that when the two teams face off in back-to-back ODI and T20I series, there would be a points structure including both formats so as to prevent the trophy from changing hands within days.

The trophy was contested annually from 2004–05 until 2009–10 as a three- or five-match series, and as a one-match series during the group stage of the World Cups in 2011 and 2015. Although the 2015 Cricket World Cup Final was also contested between the same teams, that game was not considered to be a part of this trophy. The 2017–18 edition was replaced with the 2017–18 Trans-Tasman Tri-Series, but the series partially went ahead as planned in Australia in 2019–20. With only one ODI being played in 2019–20 as a result of the COVID-19 pandemic, Cricket Australia confirmed the fixtures for a rescheduled three match ODI series against New Zealand, ultimately being played in September 2022 after being postponed numerous times.

== Trophy history ==
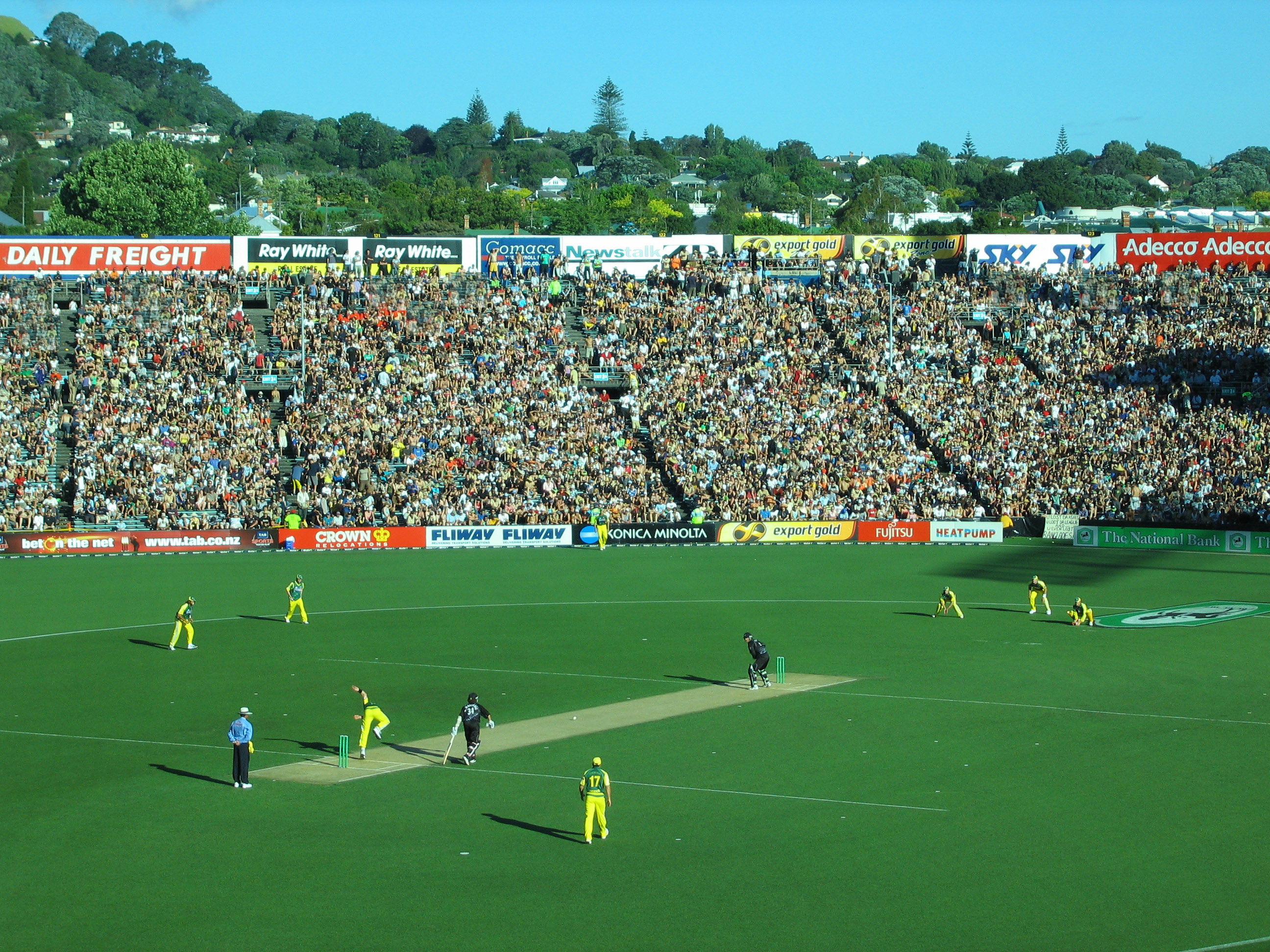
Action from a Chappell–Hadlee Trophy match on 3 December 2005

Chappell–Hadlee Trophy matches have seen several notable results and records broken:

- New Zealand has completed three notably large run chases in Chappell–Hadlee Trophy matches. In the third ODI in 2005–06 in Christchurch, New Zealand, successfully chased Australia's total of 332, setting a new record for the highest run chase in ODI history; this record was surpassed by South Africa later in the 2005–06 season. Then, in the 2006–07 series, New Zealand successfully chased 336 in the second ODI in Auckland, and successfully chased 346 in the third ODI in Hamilton. For a time, these three matches were the second, third and fourth-highest run chases in ODI history.
- In the first ODI in 2006–07 in Wellington, Australia was beaten by 10 wickets for the first time in ODI history. This was Australia's 646th ODI match.
- After its loss in the second ODI in 2006–07 in Auckland, Australia lost the top spot in the ICC ODI Championship for the first time since the standings were introduced in October 2002, ending a streak of 52 consecutive months at the top.^{Note 1}
- In the third ODI in 2006–07 in Hamilton, Matthew Hayden scored 181 not out for Australia in the first innings, setting a new record for the highest individual innings by an Australian batsman; this record stood until 2011. Craig McMillan then scored a century in 67 balls in the second innings, which (until 1 January 2014, when both Corey Anderson (off 36 balls) and Jesse Ryder (off 46 balls) broke this record in the 3rd ODI vs West Indies in Queenstown) was the fastest ever ODI century by a New Zealand batsman.

== Overall statistics ==
=== Series ===
Played	Australia	New Zealand	Draw
14	8	4	2
Last updated: 4 October 2025

=== Matches ===
Played	Australia	New Zealand	Tied	No result
38	22	14	0	2
Last updated: 4 October 2025

=== Series results ===
Season	Host	Result	Player of the Series
2004–05	Australia	Drawn 1–1	Daniel Vettori
2005–06	New Zealand	Australia won 2–1	N/A
2006–07	New Zealand	New Zealand won 3–0	N/A
2007–08	Australia	Australia won 2–0	Ricky Ponting
2008–09	Australia	Drawn 2–2	Michael Hussey
2009–10	New Zealand	Australia won 3–2	N/A
2011^{†}	India	Australia won 1–0	Mitchell Johnson*
2015^{†}	New Zealand	New Zealand won 1–0	Trent Boult*
2015–16	New Zealand	New Zealand won 2–1	N/A
2016–17	Australia	Australia won 3–0	David Warner
2016–17	New Zealand	New Zealand won 2–0	N/A
2019–20	Australia	Australia won 1–0	Mitchell Marsh*
2022–23	Australia	Australia won 3–0	Steve Smith
2023–24	New Zealand	Australia won 3–0	Mitchell Marsh
2025–26	New Zealand	Australia won 2–0	Mitchell Marsh

- ^{†}Cricket World Cup fixture
- *Player of the match award in one-off ODI

== Series ==
=== 2004–05 series in Australia ===
Chappell–Hadlee Trophy 2004–05. One Day International series result: Series tied 1–1.

One Day International series
No.	Date	Australia captain	New Zealand captain	Venue	Result
ODI 2196	5 Dec 2004	Ricky Ponting	Stephen Fleming	Telstra Dome, Melbourne	New Zealand by 4 wickets
ODI 2198	8 Dec 2004	Ricky Ponting	Stephen Fleming	Sydney Cricket Ground, Sydney	Australia by 17 runs
ODI 2198a	10 Dec 2004	Ricky Ponting	Stephen Fleming	The Gabba, Brisbane	Abandoned

=== 2005–06 series in New Zealand ===
Chappell–Hadlee Trophy 2005–06. One Day International series result: Australia won 2–1.

One Day International series
No.	Date	New Zealand captain	Australia captain	Venue	Result
ODI 2301	3 Dec 2005	Daniel Vettori	Ricky Ponting	Eden Park, Auckland	Australia by 147 runs
ODI 2302	7 Dec 2005	Daniel Vettori	Ricky Ponting	Westpac Stadium, Wellington	Australia by 2 runs
ODI 2303	10 Dec 2005	Daniel Vettori	Ricky Ponting	Jade Stadium, Christchurch	New Zealand by 2 wickets

=== 2006–07 series in New Zealand ===
Chappell–Hadlee Trophy 2006–07. One Day International series result: New Zealand won 3–0.

One Day International series
No.	Date	New Zealand captain	Australia captain	Venue	Result
ODI 2524	16 Feb 2007	Stephen Fleming	Michael Hussey	Westpac Stadium, Wellington	New Zealand by 10 wickets
ODI 2526	18 Feb 2007	Stephen Fleming	Michael Hussey	Eden Park, Auckland	New Zealand by 5 wickets
ODI 2527	20 Feb 2007	Stephen Fleming	Michael Hussey	Seddon Park, Hamilton	New Zealand by 1 wicket

=== 2007–08 series in Australia ===
Chappell–Hadlee Trophy 2007–08. One Day International series result: Australia won 2–0.

One Day International series
No.	Date	Australia captain	New Zealand captain	Venue	Result
ODI 2655	14 Dec 2007	Ricky Ponting	Daniel Vettori	Adelaide Oval, Adelaide	Australia by 7 wickets
ODI 2656	16 Dec 2007	Ricky Ponting	Daniel Vettori	Sydney Cricket Ground, Sydney	No result
ODI 2657	20 Dec 2007	Ricky Ponting	Daniel Vettori	Bellerive Oval, Hobart	Australia by 114 runs

=== 2008–09 series in Australia ===
Chappell–Hadlee Trophy 2008–09. One Day International series result: Australia retains trophy after 2–2 draw.

One Day International series
No.	Date	Australia captain	New Zealand captain	Venue	Result
ODI 2811	1 Feb 2009	Ricky Ponting	Daniel Vettori	WACA Ground, Perth	New Zealand by 2 wickets
ODI 2816	6 Feb 2009	Michael Clarke	Daniel Vettori	Melbourne Cricket Ground, Melbourne	New Zealand by 6 wickets
ODI 2817	8 Feb 2009	Ricky Ponting	Daniel Vettori	Sydney Cricket Ground, Sydney	Australia by 32 runs
ODI 2819	10 Feb 2009	Ricky Ponting	Daniel Vettori	Adelaide Oval, Adelaide	Australia by 6 wickets
ODI 2820	13 Feb 2009	Ricky Ponting	Daniel Vettori	The Gabba, Brisbane	No result

=== 2009–10 series in New Zealand ===
Chappell–Hadlee Trophy 2009–10. One Day International series result: Australia won 3–2.

One Day International series
No.	Date	New Zealand captain	Australia captain	Player of the Match	Venue	Result
ODI 2966	3 March 2010	Ross Taylor	Ricky Ponting	Ross Taylor	McLean Park, Napier	New Zealand by 2 wickets
ODI 2969	6 March 2010	Daniel Vettori	Ricky Ponting	Daniel Vettori	Eden Park, Auckland	Australia by 12 runs
ODI 2971	9 March 2010	Daniel Vettori	Ricky Ponting	Brad Haddin	Seddon Park, Hamilton	Australia by 6 wickets
ODI 2973	11 March 2010	Daniel Vettori	Ricky Ponting	Cameron White	Eden Park, Auckland	Australia by 6 wickets
ODI 2975	13 March 2010	Daniel Vettori	Ricky Ponting	Tim Southee	Westpac Stadium, Wellington	New Zealand by 51 runs

=== 2010–11 series in India (World Cup 2011) ===
The only scheduled ODI between Australia and New Zealand during the 2010–11 season was during the Group Stage of the 2011 ICC Cricket World Cup, played in Nagpur, India, on 25 February 2011, so the countries agreed to contest the Chappell–Hadlee Trophy in this match. Australia won by 7 wickets.

Chappell–Hadlee Trophy 2010–11. One Day International series result: Australia won 1–0.

One Day International series
No.	Date	New Zealand captain	Australia captain	Player of the Match	Venue	Result
ODI 3107	25 February 2011	Daniel Vettori	Ricky Ponting	Mitchell Johnson	VCA Stadium, Nagpur	Australia by 7 wickets

=== 2014–15 series in New Zealand (World Cup 2015) ===
The only scheduled ODI between Australia and New Zealand during the 2014–15 season was during the Group Stage of the 2015 ICC Cricket World Cup, played in Auckland, New Zealand, on 28 February 2015, so the countries agreed to contest the Chappell–Hadlee Trophy in this match. New Zealand won by 1 wicket.

Chappell–Hadlee Trophy 2014–15. One Day International series result: New Zealand won 1–0.

One Day International series
No.	Date	New Zealand captain	Australia captain	Player of the Match	Venue	Result
ODI 3617	28 February 2015	Brendon McCullum	Michael Clarke	Trent Boult	Eden Park, Auckland	New Zealand by 1 wicket

=== 2015–16 series in New Zealand ===
Chappell–Hadlee Trophy 2015–16. One Day International series result: New Zealand won 2–1.

One Day International series
No.	Date	New Zealand captain	Australia captain	Player of the Match	Venue	Result
ODI 3731	3 February 2016	Brendon McCullum	Steve Smith	Martin Guptill	Eden Park, Auckland	New Zealand by 159 runs
ODI 3733	6 February 2016	Brendon McCullum	Steve Smith	Mitchell Marsh	Westpac Stadium, Wellington	Australia by 4 wickets
ODI 3735	8 February 2016	Brendon McCullum	Steve Smith	Ish Sodhi	Seddon Park, Hamilton	New Zealand by 55 runs

=== 2016–17 series in Australia ===
Chappell–Hadlee Trophy 2016–17. One Day International series result: Australia won 3–0.

One Day International series
No.	Date	Australia captain	New Zealand captain	Player of the Match	Venue	Result
ODI 3811	4 December 2016	Steve Smith	Kane Williamson	Steve Smith	Sydney Cricket Ground, Sydney	Australia by 68 runs
ODI 3812	6 December 2016	Steve Smith	Kane Williamson	David Warner	Manuka Oval, Canberra	Australia by 116 runs
ODI 3813	9 December 2016	Steve Smith	Kane Williamson	David Warner	Melbourne Cricket Ground, Melbourne	Australia by 117 runs

=== 2016–17 series in New Zealand ===
Chappell–Hadlee Trophy 2016–17. One Day International series result: New Zealand won 2–0.

One Day International series
No.	Date	New Zealand captain	Australia captain	Player of the Match	Venue	Result
ODI 3829	30 January 2017	Kane Williamson	Aaron Finch	Marcus Stoinis	Eden Park, Auckland	New Zealand by 7 runs
ODI 3831a	2 February 2017	Kane Williamson	Aaron Finch	None	McLean Park, Napier	Abandoned
ODI 3832	5 February 2017	Kane Williamson	Aaron Finch	Trent Boult	Seddon Park, Hamilton	New Zealand by 24 runs

=== 2019–20 series in Australia ===
Ahead of the first ODI, Cricket Australia confirmed that all matches would be played without crowd attendance, in an attempt to reduce the impact of the COVID-19 pandemic. Despite the first ODI being played, the second and third ODIs were called off on 14 March 2020, as a result of new travel restrictions being implemented in response to the coronavirus pandemic. In May 2020, Cricket Australia confirmed the fixtures for a rescheduled three match ODI series against New Zealand in January and February 2021.

Chappell–Hadlee Trophy 2019–20. One Day International series result: Australia won 1–0.

One Day International series
No.	Date	Australia captain	New Zealand captain	Player of the Match	Venue	Result
ODI 4255	13 March 2020	Aaron Finch	Kane Williamson	Mitchell Marsh	Sydney Cricket Ground, Sydney	Australia by 71 runs

=== 2022–23 series in Australia ===
Chappell–Hadlee Trophy 2022–23. One Day International series result: Australia won 3–0.

One Day International series
No.	Date	Home captain	Away captain	Player of the Match	Venue	Result
ODI 4461	6 September 2022	Aaron Finch	Kane Williamson	Cameron Green	Cazalys Stadium, Cairns	Australia by 2 Wickets
ODI 4462	8 September 2022	Aaron Finch	Kane Williamson	Mitchell Starc	Cazalys Stadium, Cairns	Australia by 113 runs
ODI 4464	11 September 2022	Aaron Finch	Kane Williamson	Steve Smith	Cazalys Stadium, Cairns	Australia by 25 runs

=== 2023–24 series in New Zealand ===
Chappell–Hadlee Trophy 2023–24. Twenty20 International series result: Australia won 3–0.

Twenty20 International series
No.	Date	Home captain	Away captain	Player of the Match	Venue	Result
T20I 2481	21 February 2024	Mitchell Santner	Mitchell Marsh	Mitchell Marsh	Sky Stadium, Wellington	Australia by 6 wickets
T20I 2483	23 February 2024	Mitchell Santner	Mitchell Marsh	Pat Cummins	Eden Park, Auckland	Australia by 72 runs
T20I 2484	25 February 2024	Mitchell Santner	Matthew Wade	Matthew Short	Eden Park, Auckland	Australia by 27 runs (DLS)

=== 2025–26 series in New Zealand ===
Chappell–Hadlee Trophy 2025–26. Twenty20 International series result: Australia won 2–0.

Twenty20 International series
No.	Date	Home captain	Away captain	Player of the Match	Venue	Result
T20I 3491	1 October 2025	Michael Bracewell	Mitchell Marsh	Mitchell Marsh	Bay Oval, Mount Maunganui	Australia by 6 wickets
T20I 3497	3 October 2025	Michael Bracewell	Mitchell Marsh	—	Bay Oval, Mount Maunganui	No result
T20I 3499	4 October 2025	Michael Bracewell	Mitchell Marsh	Mitchell Marsh	Bay Oval, Mount Maunganui	Australia by 3 wickets

== See also ==
- Trans-Tasman Trophy
- Australia–New Zealand sports rivalries
