= New Zealand cricket team in Australia in 2019–20 =

International cricket tour

	Australia	New Zealand
- Dates: 12 December 2019 – 20 March 2020
Captains	Tim Paine (Tests); Aaron Finch (ODIs)	Kane Williamson (Note: Tom Latham captained New Zealand for the third Test.)

Test series
- Result: Australia won the 3-match series 3–0
Most runs	Marnus Labuschagne (549)	Tom Blundell (172)
Most wickets	Nathan Lyon (20)	Neil Wagner (17)
- Player of the series: Marnus Labuschagne (Aus)

One Day International series
- Results: Australia won the 3-match series 1–0
Most runs	David Warner (67)	Martin Guptill (40)
Most wickets	Pat Cummins (3); Mitchell Marsh (3)	Ish Sodhi (3)

The New Zealand cricket team toured Australia in November and December 2019 to play three Test matches. The Test series was played for the Trans-Tasman Trophy and formed part of the inaugural 2019–2021 ICC World Test Championship. The first Test was a day/night match at the Perth Stadium. Cricket Australia confirmed the fixtures for the tour in May 2019. New Zealand returned to Australia in March 2020 to play three One Day International (ODI) matches for the Chappell–Hadlee Trophy.

In the first Test, Aleem Dar of Pakistan stood in his 129th Test match as an on-field umpire, surpassing Jamaican Steve Bucknor's record of officiating in the most Test matches. Ahead of the fourth day of the second Test match, Australia's Peter Siddle announced his retirement from international cricket. Australia won the first two Test matches to take an unassailable lead, and therefore retaining the Trans-Tasman Trophy. Australia won the third and final Test match by 279 runs, therefore winning the series 3–0. It was the first time that New Zealand had been whitewashed in a three-match Test series in Australia. During the third Test, Ross Taylor went past Stephen Fleming's career total of 7,172 runs to become the leading run-scorer for New Zealand in Test cricket.

Ahead of the first ODI, Cricket Australia confirmed that all three ODIs would be played without crowd attendance, in an attempt to reduce the impact of the COVID-19 pandemic. Despite the first ODI being played, the second and third ODIs were called off on 14 March 2020, as a result of new travel restrictions being implemented in response to the coronavirus pandemic. Both Cricket Australia and New Zealand Cricket have expressed their interest to reschedule the remaining ODI matches at a later date. On 28 May 2020, Cricket Australia confirmed the fixtures for a rescheduled three match ODI series against New Zealand in January and February 2021.

== Squads ==
Tests		ODIs	
Australia	New Zealand	Australia	New Zealand
Tim Paine (c, wk); Pat Cummins (vc); Travis Head (vc); Joe Burns; Josh Hazlewood; Marnus Labuschagne; Nathan Lyon; Michael Neser; James Pattinson; Peter Siddle; Steve Smith; Mitchell Starc; Mitchell Swepson; Matthew Wade; David Warner	Kane Williamson (c); Tom Latham (vc); Todd Astle; Tom Blundell; Trent Boult; Colin de Grandhomme; Lockie Ferguson; Matt Henry; Kyle Jamieson; Henry Nicholls; Glenn Phillips; Jeet Raval; Mitchell Santner; William Somerville; Tim Southee; Ross Taylor; Neil Wagner; BJ Watling (wk)	Aaron Finch (c); Alex Carey (vc, wk); Pat Cummins (vc); Sean Abbott; Ashton Agar; Josh Hazlewood; Marnus Labuschagne; Mitchell Marsh; Kane Richardson; Steve Smith; D'Arcy Short; Mitchell Starc; Matthew Wade; David Warner; Adam Zampa	Kane Williamson (c); Tom Latham (vc, wk); Tom Blundell; Trent Boult; Colin de Grandhomme; Lockie Ferguson; Martin Guptill; Matt Henry; Kyle Jamieson; James Neesham; Henry Nicholls; Mitchell Santner; Ish Sodhi; Tim Southee; Ross Taylor

Peter Siddle was added to Australia's squad ahead of the second Test after Josh Hazlewood was ruled out due to a hamstring strain. Kyle Jamieson was added to New Zealand's squad ahead of the second Test after Lockie Ferguson was ruled out due to a calf strain. Mitchell Swepson was added to Australia's squad ahead of the third Test. Trent Boult was ruled out of the third Test after fracturing his right hand during the second Test. William Somerville was named as Boult's replacement. Ahead of the third Test, Glenn Phillips was added to New Zealand's squad, as cover for Kane Williamson and Henry Nicholls who were suffering with flu-like symptoms.

Ahead of the first ODI, Sean Abbott was added to Australia's squad, as cover for Kane Richardson who reported symptoms of COVID-19. However, he tested negative and re-joined the squad during the first ODI. Following the first ODI, New Zealand's Lockie Ferguson was placed in quarantine after he reported that he had a sore throat.

== Test series ==
=== 1st Test ===
12–16 December 2019 (Note: While five days of play were scheduled for each Test, all three Tests reached a result in four days.) (D/N)
Scorecard

Australia	v	New Zealand
416 (146.2 overs); Marnus Labuschagne 143 (240); Neil Wagner 4/92 (37 overs)		166 (55.2 overs); Ross Taylor 80 (134); Mitchell Starc 5/52 (18 overs)
9/217d (69.1 overs); Joe Burns 53 (123); Tim Southee 5/69 (21.1 overs)		171 (65.3 overs); BJ Watling 40 (106); Mitchell Starc 4/45 (14 overs)

Australia won by 296 runs
Perth Stadium, Perth
Umpires: Aleem Dar (Pak) and Nigel Llong (Eng)
Player of the match: Mitchell Starc (Aus)

- Australia won the toss and elected to bat.
- Lockie Ferguson (NZ) made his Test debut.
- Aleem Dar set the record for the most Test matches umpired with 129.
- David Warner (Aus) scored his 7,000th run in Tests.
- Marnus Labuschagne (Aus) scored his 1,000th run in Tests.
- Colin de Grandhomme (NZ) scored his 1,000th run in Tests.
- World Test Championship points: Australia 40, New Zealand 0.

=== 2nd Test ===
26–30 December 2019
Scorecard

Australia	v	New Zealand
467 (155.1 overs); Travis Head 114 (234); Neil Wagner 4/83 (38 overs)		148 (54.5 overs); Tom Latham 50 (144); Pat Cummins 5/28 (17 overs)
5/168d (54.2 overs); David Warner 38 (65); Neil Wagner 3/50 (17.2 overs)		240 (71 overs); Tom Blundell 121 (210); Nathan Lyon 4/81 (23 overs)

Australia won by 247 runs
Melbourne Cricket Ground, Melbourne
Umpires: Marais Erasmus (SA) and Nigel Llong (Eng)
Player of the match: Travis Head (Aus)

- New Zealand won the toss and elected to field.
- Neil Wagner (NZ) took his 200th wicket in Tests.
- Travis Head (Aus) scored his 1,000th run in Tests.
- Australia retained the Trans-Tasman Trophy as a result of this match.
- World Test Championship points: Australia 40, New Zealand 0.

=== 3rd Test ===
3–7 January 2020
Scorecard

Australia	v	New Zealand
454 (150.1 overs); Marnus Labuschagne 215 (363); Neil Wagner 3/66 (33.1 overs)		256 (95.4 overs); Glenn Phillips 52 (115); Nathan Lyon 5/68 (30.4 overs)
2/217d (52 overs); David Warner 111* (159); Todd Astle 1/41 (8 overs)		136 (47.5 overs); Colin de Grandhomme 52 (68); Nathan Lyon 5/50 (16.5 overs)

Australia won by 279 runs
Sydney Cricket Ground, Sydney
Umpires: Aleem Dar (Pak) and Marais Erasmus (SA)
Player of the match: Marnus Labuschagne (Aus)

- Australia won the toss and elected to bat.
- Glenn Phillips (NZ) made his Test debut.
- Tom Latham played in his 50th Test and captained New Zealand for the first time in Tests.
- Marnus Labuschagne (Aus) scored his first double century in Tests.
- Ross Taylor became the leading run-scorer for New Zealand in Tests, surpassing Stephen Fleming's career total of 7,172.
- World Test Championship points: Australia 40, New Zealand 0.

== ODI series ==
=== 1st ODI ===
13 March 2020
14:30 (D/N)
Scorecard

Australia; 7/258 (50 overs)	v	New Zealand; 187 (41 overs)
David Warner 67 (88); Ish Sodhi 3/51 (8 overs)		Martin Guptill 40 (73); Pat Cummins 3/25 (8 overs)

Australia won by 71 runs
Sydney Cricket Ground, Sydney
Umpires: Marais Erasmus (SA) and Paul Wilson (Aus)
Player of the match: Mitchell Marsh (Aus)

- Australia won the toss and elected to bat.

=== 2nd ODI ===
15 March 2020
10:30
Scorecard

Australia	v	New Zealand

Match cancelled without a ball bowled
Sydney Cricket Ground, Sydney
Umpires: Richard Illingworth (Eng) and Sam Nogajski (Aus)

=== 3rd ODI ===
20 March 2020
14:30 (D/N)
Scorecard

Australia	v	New Zealand

Match cancelled without a ball bowled
Bellerive Oval, Hobart
Umpires: Marais Erasmus (SA) and Paul Wilson (Aus)
