= Australian cricket team in New Zealand in 2015–16 =

International cricket tour

	New Zealand	Australia
- Dates: 3 February 2016 – 24 February 2016
Captains	Brendon McCullum	Steve Smith

Test series
- Result: Australia won the 2-match series 2–0
Most runs	Brendon McCullum (180)	Adam Voges (309)
Most wickets	Neil Wagner (7)	Nathan Lyon (10)

One Day International series
- Results: New Zealand won the 3-match series 2–1
Most runs	Martin Guptill (180)	David Warner (126)
Most wickets	Matt Henry (8)	Mitchell Marsh (7); Josh Hazlewood (7)

The Australian cricket team toured New Zealand from 3 to 24 February 2016. Originally the tour was going to consist of three Test matches. In June 2015, New Zealand Cricket were in talks with Cricket Australia to have a tour consisting of two Tests and three One Day Internationals (ODIs). In August 2015, the fixtures were announced which contained the reduction of Tests from three to two and the addition of the three ODIs.

In December 2015 New Zealand captain Brendon McCullum announced that he would be retiring from all forms of international cricket at the conclusion of the series. New Zealand won the ODI series 2–1 to retain the Chappell–Hadlee Trophy. McCullum finished his ODI career with the best win–loss ratio of any New Zealander who has captained in ten or more matches. In his final match, McCullum broke the record for the fastest century scored in Test cricket. Australia won the Test series 2–0, to retain the Trans-Tasman Trophy and regain the number one position in the ICC Test Championship.

Adam Voges, who hit the winning runs, finished the Test series with a batting average of 95.50.

== Squads ==
Tests		ODIs	
New Zealand	Australia	New Zealand	Australia
Brendon McCullum (c); Corey Anderson; Doug Bracewell; Trent Boult; Mark Craig; Martin Guptill; Matt Henry; Tom Latham; Henry Nicholls; Mitchell Santner; Tim Southee; Neil Wagner; BJ Watling (wk); Kane Williamson	Steve Smith (c); David Warner (vc); Jackson Bird; Joe Burns; Josh Hazlewood; Usman Khawaja; Nathan Lyon; Mitchell Marsh; Shaun Marsh; Peter Nevill (wk); James Pattinson; Chadd Sayers; ~~Peter Siddle~~; Adam Voges	Brendon McCullum (c); Corey Anderson; Trent Boult; Doug Bracewell; Grant Elliott; Martin Guptill; Matt Henry; Adam Milne; Colin Munro; Henry Nicholls; Luke Ronchi (wk); Mitchell Santner; Kane Williamson	Steve Smith (c); David Warner (vc); George Bailey; Scott Boland; ~~James Faulkner~~; John Hastings; Josh Hazlewood; Usman Khawaja; Mitchell Marsh; Shaun Marsh; Glenn Maxwell; Joel Paris; ~~Kane Richardson~~; Marcus Stoinis; Matthew Wade (wk); Adam Zampa

James Faulkner was ruled out of Australia's squad after suffering a hamstring injury in the first ODI. He was replaced by Marcus Stoinis. Kane Richardson was ruled out of the last two ODIs due to a back injury. He was replaced in the squad by Joel Paris. Mark Craig replaced Mitchell Santner after Santer was ruled out due to bone bruise in his left foot. Peter Siddle missed the second Test due to a back injury sustained in the first Test.

== ODI series ==
=== 1st ODI ===
3 February
14:00 (D/N)
Scorecard

New Zealand; 307/8 (50 overs)	v	Australia; 148 (24.2 overs)
Martin Guptill 90 (76); Mitchell Marsh 2/35 (7 overs)		Matthew Wade 37 (38); Trent Boult 3/38 (7 overs)

New Zealand won by 159 runs
Eden Park, Auckland
Umpires: Ian Gould (Eng) and Derek Walker (NZ)
Player of the match: Martin Guptill (NZ)

- Australia won the toss and elected to field.
- This was New Zealand's second biggest win against Australia in an ODI match by number of runs.
- This was the fewest overs that Australia have been bowled out in an ODI match.

=== 2nd ODI ===
6 February
14:00 (D/N)
Scorecard

New Zealand; 281/9 (50 overs)	v	Australia; 283/6 (46.3 overs)
Kane Williamson 60 (74); Josh Hazlewood 3/61 (10 overs)		David Warner 98 (79); Mitchell Santner 3/47 (10 overs)

Australia won by 4 wickets
Westpac Stadium, Wellington
Umpires: Billy Bowden (NZ) and Sundaram Ravi (Ind)
Player of the match: Mitchell Marsh (Aus)

- New Zealand won the toss and elected to bat.
- Adam Zampa (Aus) made his ODI debut.
- This was Australia's highest successful run chase in an ODI in New Zealand.
- Umpire Billy Bowden stood in his 200th ODI match.

=== 3rd ODI ===
8 February
14:00 (D/N)
Scorecard

New Zealand; 246 (45.3 overs)	v	Australia; 191 (43.4 overs)
Martin Guptill 59 (61); Mitchell Marsh 3/34 (6 overs)		Usman Khawaja 44 (36); Matt Henry 3/60 (10 overs)

New Zealand won by 55 runs
Seddon Park, Hamilton
Umpires: Ian Gould (Eng) and Derek Walker (NZ)
Player of the match: Ish Sodhi (NZ)

- Australia won the toss and elected to field.
- Brendon McCullum (NZ) played his final ODI game.
- Brendon McCullum hit three sixes in this match, bringing his career total to 200 sixes in 228 innings.

== Test series ==
=== 1st Test ===
12–16 February
Scorecard

New Zealand	v	Australia
183 (48 overs); Mark Craig 41* (57); Josh Hazlewood 4/42 (14 overs)		562 (154.2 overs); Adam Voges 239 (364); Corey Anderson 2/79 (18 overs)
327 (104.3 overs); Tom Latham 63 (164); Nathan Lyon 4/91 (31 overs)

Australia won by an innings and 52 runs
Basin Reserve, Wellington
Umpires: Richard Illingworth (Eng) and Richard Kettleborough (Eng)
Player of the match: Adam Voges (Aus)

- Australia won the toss and elected to field.
- Henry Nicholls (NZ) made his Test debut.
- Brendon McCullum (NZ) played in his 100th Test, and became the first player in Test cricket to play 100 consecutive Tests since his debut.
- Adam Voges (Aus) broke the record for the most Test runs (614) between dismissals.

=== 2nd Test ===
20–24 February
Scorecard

New Zealand	v	Australia
370 (65.4 overs); Brendon McCullum 145 (79); Nathan Lyon 3/61 (10 overs)		505 (153.1 overs); Joe Burns 170 (321); Neil Wagner 6/106 (32.1 overs)
335 (111.1 overs); Kane Williamson 97 (210); Jackson Bird 5/59 (17.1 overs)		201/3 (54 overs); Joe Burns 65 (162); Tim Southee 1/30 (7 overs)

Australia won by 7 wickets
Hagley Oval, Christchurch
Umpires: Richard Kettleborough (Eng) and Ranmore Martinesz (SL)
Player of the match: Joe Burns (Aus)

- Australia won the toss and elected to field.
- Brendon McCullum (NZ) played in his final Test match.
- McCullum scored the highest Test score by a New Zealander in their last Test match.
- McCullum broke the record for the most sixes hit in Test matches (107).
- McCullum also scored the fastest Test century (54 balls).
- The 179-run partnership at a run rate of 9.76 between McCullum and Corey Anderson is the highest 5th wicket partnership for New Zealand against Australia and the second fastest Test partnership of 100 or more.
- The 289-run partnership between Steve Smith and Joe Burns is the highest 3rd wicket partnership for Australia against New Zealand.
- 17 catches were taken by fielders in the first two innings of the match, the most in Test history.
- Joe Burns scored the highest score by an Australian opener in New Zealand.
- Kane Williamson became youngest (age of 25 years, 199 days) and quickest (89 innings) New Zealander to reach 4000 Test runs.
- Jackson Bird (Aus) took his maiden five-wicket haul in Tests.
