= Australian cricket team in India in 2022–23 (September 2022) =

International cricket tour

	India	Australia
- Dates: 20 September 2022 – 25 September 2022
Captains	Rohit Sharma	Pat Cummins

Twenty20 International series
- Results: India won the 3-match series 2–1
Most runs	Suryakumar Yadav (115)	Cameron Green (118)
Most wickets	Axar Patel (8)	Nathan Ellis (3); Adam Zampa (3); Josh Hazlewood (3)
- Player of the series: Axar Patel (Ind)

The Australian cricket team toured India in September 2022 to play three Twenty20 International (T20I) matches as a preparatory series before 2022 ICC Men's T20 World Cup. Australia won the first T20I by 4 wickets, to lead the series 1–0. The second T20I was reduced to 8 overs per side due to a wet outfield, with India winning the match by 6 wickets. India won the third and final T20I by 6 wickets to win the series 2–1.

== Scheduling ==
In August 2022, the Board of Control for Cricket in India (BCCI) confirmed the schedule for the T20Is.

== Squads ==
T20Is
India	Australia
Rohit Sharma (c); K. L. Rahul (vc); Ravichandran Ashwin; Jasprit Bumrah; Yuzvendra Chahal; Deepak Chahar; Deepak Hooda; Dinesh Karthik (wk); Virat Kohli; Bhuvneshwar Kumar; Hardik Pandya; Rishabh Pant (wk); Axar Patel; Harshal Patel; ~~Mohammed Shami~~; Suryakumar Yadav; Umesh Yadav	Aaron Finch (c); Pat Cummins (vc); Sean Abbott; Ashton Agar; Tim David; Nathan Ellis; Cameron Green; Josh Hazlewood; Josh Inglis (wk); ~~Mitchell Marsh~~; Glenn Maxwell; Kane Richardson; Daniel Sams; Steve Smith; ~~Mitchell Starc~~; ~~Marcus Stoinis~~; Matthew Wade (wk); Adam Zampa

Before the start of the T20I series, Mitchell Marsh, Mitchell Starc and Marcus Stoinis were ruled out due to injuries, and were replaced by Sean Abbott, Nathan Ellis and Daniel Sams. India's Mohammed Shami was ruled of the T20I series due to COVID-19, with Umesh Yadav named as his replacement.

== T20I series ==
=== 1st T20I ===
20 September 2022
19:00 (N)
Scorecard

India; 208/6 (20 overs)	v	Australia; 211/6 (19.2 overs)
Hardik Pandya 71* (30); Nathan Ellis 3/30 (4 overs)		Cameron Green 61 (30); Axar Patel 3/17 (4 overs)

Australia won by 4 wickets
I. S. Bindra Stadium, Mohali
Umpires: K. N. Ananthapadmanabhan (Ind) and Jayaraman Madanagopal (Ind)
Player of the match: Cameron Green (Aus)

- Australia won the toss and elected to field.
- Tim David made his T20I debut for Australia after previously playing fourteen T20Is for Singapore, becoming the sixteenth cricketer to represent two international teams in T20Is.
- KL Rahul (Ind) became the third Indian to score 2,000 runs in T20Is.
- This was Australia's second highest successful run chase in T20Is.

=== 2nd T20I ===
23 September 2022
19:00 (N)
Scorecard

Australia; 90/5 (8 overs)	v	India; 92/4 (7.2 overs)
Matthew Wade 43* (20); Axar Patel 2/13 (2 overs)		Rohit Sharma 46* (20); Adam Zampa 3/16 (2 overs)

India won by 6 wickets
Vidarbha Cricket Association Stadium, Nagpur
Umpires: K. N. Ananthapadmanabhan (Ind) and Nitin Menon (Ind)
Player of the match: Rohit Sharma (Ind)

- India won the toss and elected to field.
- The match was reduced to 8 overs per side due to rain and a wet outfield.

=== 3rd T20I ===
25 September 2022
19:00 (N)
Scorecard

Australia; 186/7 (20 overs)	v	India; 187/4 (19.5 overs)
Tim David 54 (27); Axar Patel 3/33 (4 overs)		Suryakumar Yadav 69 (36); Daniel Sams 2/33 (3.5 overs)

India won by 6 wickets
Rajiv Gandhi International Cricket Stadium, Hyderabad
Umpires: Jayaraman Madanagopal (Ind) and Nitin Menon (Ind)
Player of the match: Suryakumar Yadav (Ind)

- India won the toss and elected to field.
