= 2005–06 Chappell–Hadlee Trophy =

- Date: 3–10 December 2005
- Location: New Zealand
- Result: Australia won the three-match series 2–1
Teams
- Australia: New Zealand
Captains
- RT Ponting: DL Vettori
Most runs
- A Symonds (201) MJ Clarke (184) RT Ponting (166): SB Styris (127); L Vincent (114); JDP Oram (106)
Most wickets
- SR Clark (8) B Lee (4) ML Lewis (4): DL Vettori (5); KD Mills (4); CS Martin (3)

The 2005–06 Chappell–Hadlee Trophy was the second edition of Chappell–Hadlee Trophy, a three-match ODI series between Australia and New Zealand. It was played in New Zealand from 3 to 10 December 2005.

New Zealand had come off a 4–0 loss in South Africa two months before, but in August they had defeated India to win the Videocon Tri-Series. Australia's most recent result against a regular national team was a tie in the final of the NatWest Series with England. From the last series, Jason Gillespie, Matthew Hayden and Darren Lehmann had been dropped by Australia, while Damien Martyn was out with injury and Glenn McGrath was rested. New Zealand's changes had mainly been through injuries, as Stephen Fleming had undergone surgery on a tumour and was replaced as captain by Daniel Vettori. Mathew Sinclair was also left out, for Craig McMillan, while Chris Harris had been replaced by James Franklin.

== ODI series ==
=== 1st ODI ===
3 December 2005
14:00 (D/N)
Scorecard

Australia; 8/252 (50 overs)	v	New Zealand; 105 (27.4 overs)
RT Ponting 63 (64); DL Vettori 2/29 (10 overs)		CL Cairns 37* (32); B Lee 3/5 (6 overs)

Australia won by 147 runs
Eden Park, Auckland
Umpires: Aleem Dar (Pak) and AL Hill (NZ)
Player of the match: B Lee (Aus)

- New Zealand won the toss and elected to field.
- BJ Hodge (Aus) made his ODI debut.

The series began at Eden Park in Auckland on 3 December. Australia won the toss and chose to bat first, and made eight for 252 after Ricky Ponting and Simon Katich hit half-centuries, sharing a stand of 118. Makeshift captain Daniel Vettori took two wickets as Australia lost three men for 27, including ODI debutant Brad Hodge for 13, before a stand of 59 between Andrew Symonds and Michael Clarke took Australia past the 200 mark. Four wickets fell in the last eight overs, but Australia still batted out 50 overs to make eight for 252.

As mentioned, Glenn McGrath was rested, but the replacement Stuart Clark performed sufficiently, taking three wickets in his seven overs as New Zealand lost eight batsmen in single figures. Clark, who played in his second one-day international for Australia, was not named Man of the Match, however – that honour fell to Brett Lee, who bowled four maidens with the new ball, taking three wickets for five runs including both the Marshall twins, Hamish and James, and ending with the bowling analysis of 6–4–5–3. With Nathan Bracken, the replacement for Gillespie, taking two wickets as well, New Zealand finished on a total of 105, though after 12.3 overs they had been at 6 for 33. Jacob Oram put on 41 with Chris Cairns before Oram was bowled by Clark, and seven overs later the innings was over as Clark got another wicket and Andrew Symonds got the numbers 10 and 11.

=== 2nd ODI ===
7 December 2005
14:00 (D/N)
Scorecard

Australia; 5/322 (50 overs)	v	New Zealand; 320 (49.5 overs)
A Symonds 156 (127); KD Mills 2/60 (10 overs)		L Vincent 71 (49); ML Lewis 3/56 (9.5 overs)

Australia won by 2 runs
Westpac Stadium, Wellington
Umpires: Aleem Dar (Pak) and BF Bowden (NZ)
Player of the match: A Symonds (Aus)

- Australia won the toss and elected to bat.
- ML Lewis (Aus) made his ODI debut.

The second match was played at Westpac Stadium in Wellington on 7 December. This match saw an Australian record partnership between Michael Clarke and Andrew Symonds, who added 220 for the fifth wicket, Symonds hitting eight sixes and twelve fours on his way to a record score in ODIs between the two sides. His 156 was the third-highest by an Australian against any opponent, and the stand with Clarke paved the way for a total of 322 for 5. New Zealand had Lou Vincent hit 71 off 49 balls before he was first out, on 93 for 1, but rookie bowlers Mick Lewis and Stuart Clark (with four ODIs between them) shared four wickets, and New Zealand needed 53 from 33 balls when Jacob Oram cut a bouncer to Clark for 41. Brendon McCullum added 24 with substitute James Marshall, before the latter was run out, and New Zealand still needed 24 off the final two overs. The penultimate over yielded 18 runs as Brett Lee bowled a no-ball and a wide, and another ball was adjudged a no ball as Australia had too few players inside the circle. Lewis was left to bowl the last over, and with six runs required the last two batsmen were run out, leaving New Zealand on 320 – two runs short of victory. Australia thus clinched the Chappell–Hadlee Trophy with a match to spare.

=== 3rd ODI ===
10 December 2005
14:00 (D/N)
Scorecard

Australia; 7/331 (50 overs)	v	New Zealand; 8/332 (49 overs)
MEK Hussey 88* (56); CS Martin 3/65 (9 overs)		SB Styris 101 (96); SR Clark 4/55 (10 overs)

New Zealand won by 2 wickets
Jade Stadium, Christchurch
Umpires: Aleem Dar (Pak) and GAV Baxter (NZ)
Player of the match: SB Styris (NZ)

- New Zealand won the toss and elected to field.
- MG Johnson (Aus) made his ODI debut.

The last match was played at Jade Stadium in Christchurch on 10 December. It was a dead rubber as Australia had already won the Trophy. Mitchell Johnson was given his debut as Super Sub, coming in after Australia had batted to seven for 331 with four half-centuries. Johnson bowled nine overs for 64, without taking a wicket, and Scott Styris hit a hundred as New Zealand chased down the target for the highest successful run chase in ODI cricket thus far. This was also New Zealand's first win in their last eight one-day internationals.
