= New Zealand cricket team in Australia in 2022–23 =

International cricket tour

	Australia	New Zealand
- Dates: 6 – 11 September 2022
Captains	Aaron Finch	Kane Williamson

One Day International series
- Results: Australia won the 3-match series 3–0
Most runs	Steve Smith (167)	Kane Williamson (89)
Most wickets	Adam Zampa (7)	Trent Boult (10)
- Player of the series: Steve Smith (Aus)

The New Zealand cricket team toured Australia in September 2022 to play three One Day International (ODI) matches. The ODI matches were played for the Chappell–Hadlee Trophy, and formed part of the inaugural 2020–2023 ICC Cricket World Cup Super League. In May 2022, Cricket Australia confirmed the fixtures for the tour.

On 10 September 2022, Aaron Finch announced his retirement from ODI cricket ahead of the third ODI.

== Background ==
Originally the tour was scheduled to take place in January and February 2021. On 28 May 2020, Cricket Australia confirmed the fixtures for the series. However, in September 2020, Cricket Australia were looking at moving the series wholly into February 2021, to avoid clashing with the end of the 2020–21 Big Bash League season. Later the same month, the tour was postponed due to the COVID-19 pandemic. Cricket Australia confirmed a revised schedule in May 2021. On 19 January 2022, the tour was postponed due to uncertainty of the New Zealand players' quarantine requirements after they return home.

== Squads ==
Australia	New Zealand
Aaron Finch (c); Sean Abbott; Ashton Agar; Alex Carey (wk); Nathan Ellis; Cameron Green; Josh Hazlewood; Josh Inglis (wk); Marnus Labuschagne; ~~Mitchell Marsh~~; Glenn Maxwell; Steve Smith; Mitchell Starc; Marcus Stoinis; David Warner; Adam Zampa	Kane Williamson (c); Finn Allen (wk); Trent Boult; Michael Bracewell; Devon Conway (wk); Lockie Ferguson; Martin Guptill; Matt Henry; Tom Latham (wk); Daryl Mitchell; James Neesham; Glenn Phillips (wk); Mitchell Santner; Ben Sears; Tim Southee

Before the start of the series, Josh Inglis was added to Australia's squad in place of Mitchell Marsh. On the eve of the third ODI, Marcus Stoinis was ruled out due to side strain and David Warner released, with Nathan Ellis added to Australia's squad.

== ODI series ==
=== 1st ODI ===
6 September 2022
14:20 (D/N)
Scorecard

New Zealand; 9/232 (50 overs)	v	Australia; 8/233 (45 overs)
Devon Conway 46 (68); Glenn Maxwell 4/52 (10 overs)		Cameron Green 89* (92); Trent Boult 4/40 (10 overs)

Australia won by 2 wickets
Cazalys Stadium, Cairns
Umpires: Sam Nogajski (Aus) and Paul Reiffel (Aus)
Player of the match: Cameron Green (Aus)

- Australia won the toss and elected to field.
- World Cup Super League points: Australia 10, New Zealand 0.

=== 2nd ODI ===
8 September 2022
14:20 (D/N)
Scorecard

Australia; 9/195 (50 overs)	v	New Zealand; 82 (33 overs)
Steve Smith 61 (94); Trent Boult 4/38 (10 overs)		Kane Williamson 17 (58); Adam Zampa 5/35 (9 overs)

Australia won by 113 runs
Cazalys Stadium, Cairns
Umpires: Rod Tucker (Aus) and Paul Wilson (Aus)
Player of the match: Mitchell Starc (Aus)

- New Zealand won the toss and elected to field.
- Adam Zampa (Aus) took his first five-wicket haul in ODIs.
- World Cup Super League points: Australia 10, New Zealand 0.

=== 3rd ODI ===
11 September 2022
14:20 (D/N)
Scorecard

Australia; 5/267 (50 overs)	v	New Zealand; 242 (49.5 overs)
Steve Smith 105 (131); Trent Boult 2/25 (10 overs)		Glenn Phillips 47 (53); Mitchell Starc 3/60 (9.5 overs)

Australia won by 25 runs
Cazalys Stadium, Cairns
Umpires: Sam Nogajski (Aus) and Paul Reiffel (Aus)
Player of the match: Steve Smith (Aus)

- New Zealand won the toss and elected to field.
- World Cup Super League points: Australia 10, New Zealand 0.
