= New Zealand cricket team in Australia in 2016–17 =

International cricket tour

	Australia	New Zealand
- Dates: 4 December 2016 – 9 December 2016
Captains	Steve Smith	Kane Williamson

One Day International series
- Results: Australia won the 3-match series 3–0
Most runs	David Warner (299)	Martin Guptill (193)
Most wickets	Pat Cummins (8)	Trent Boult (6)
- Player of the series: David Warner (Aus)

The New Zealand cricket team toured Australia in December 2016 to play three One Day Internationals (ODIs) matches. The matches were played for the Chappell–Hadlee Trophy.

The series ended with a 3–0 victory to Australia. It was just the second time New Zealand had suffered a whitewash to Australia, the first being in New Zealand in 2005.

== Squads ==
ODIs
Australia	New Zealand
Steve Smith (c); David Warner (vc); George Bailey; Hilton Cartwright; Pat Cummins; James Faulkner; Aaron Finch; Josh Hazlewood; Travis Head; Mitchell Marsh; Glenn Maxwell; Mitchell Starc; Matthew Wade (wk); Adam Zampa	Kane Williamson (c); Todd Astle; Trent Boult; Lockie Ferguson; Martin Guptill; Colin de Grandhomme; Matt Henry; Tom Latham; Colin Munro; Jimmy Neesham; Henry Nicholls; Mitchell Santner; Tim Southee; BJ Watling (wk)

== ODI series ==
=== 1st ODI ===
4 December 2016
14:20 AEDT (D/N)
Scorecard

Australia; 8/324 (50 overs)	v	New Zealand; 256 (44.2 overs)
Steve Smith 164 (157); Trent Boult 2/51 (10 overs)		Martin Guptill 114 (102); Josh Hazlewood 3/49 (10 overs)

Australia won by 68 runs
Sydney Cricket Ground, Sydney
Umpires: Kumar Dharmasena (SL) and Mick Martell (Aus)
Player of the match: Steve Smith (Aus)

- Australia won the toss and elected to bat.
- Lockie Ferguson (NZ) made his ODI debut.
- Steve Smith's score of 164 is the joint-highest by an Australia captain and also the highest score by any player in an ODI played at the Sydney Cricket Ground.
- Martin Guptill became the quickest New Zealand player to reach 5,000 runs in ODIs.
- Josh Hazlewood, in this his 27th ODI match, equaled the record for the number of matches played without being dismissed.

=== 2nd ODI ===
6 December 2016
14:20 AEDT (D/N)
Scorecard

Australia; 5/378 (50 overs)	v	New Zealand; 262 (47.2 overs)
David Warner 119 (115); Tim Southee 2/63 (10 overs)		Kane Williamson 81 (80); Pat Cummins 4/41 (10 overs)

Australia won by 116 runs
Manuka Oval, Canberra
Umpires: Kumar Dharmasena (SL) and Paul Wilson (Aus)
Player of the match: David Warner (Aus)

- New Zealand won the toss and elected to field.
- Kane Williamson (NZ) played his 100th ODI.
- David Warner became the first Australian batsman to score six ODI centuries in a calendar year.
- Josh Hazlewood, in this his 28th ODI match, broke the record for the number of matches played without being dismissed.

=== 3rd ODI ===
9 December 2016
14:20 AEDT (D/N)
Scorecard

Australia; 8/264 (50 overs)	v	New Zealand; 147 (36.1 overs)
David Warner 156 (128); Trent Boult 3/49 (10 overs)		Martin Guptill 34 (40); Mitchell Starc 3/34 (10 overs)

Australia won by 117 runs
Melbourne Cricket Ground, Melbourne
Umpires: Nigel Llong (Eng) and Mick Martell (Aus)
Player of the match: David Warner (Aus)

- Australia won the toss and elected to bat.
- David Warner became the second batsman to score seven ODI centuries in a calendar year.
- David Warner scored 59% of his team's runs, the second highest percentage by an Australian batsman in an ODI.
