= English cricket team in Australia in 2022–23 =

International cricket tour

	Australia	England
- Dates: 9 October – 22 November 2022
Captains	Pat Cummins (ODIs) (Note: Josh Hazlewood captained Australia in the second ODI.); Aaron Finch (T20Is)	Jos Buttler (Note: Moeen Ali captained England in the second ODI.)

One Day International series
- Results: Australia won the 3-match series 3–0
Most runs	Travis Head (240)	Dawid Malan (136)
Most wickets	Adam Zampa (11)	Olly Stone (4)
- Player of the series: David Warner (Aus)

Twenty20 International series
- Results: England won the 3-match series 2–0
Most runs	Mitchell Marsh (81)	Jos Buttler (150)
Most wickets	Marcus Stoinis (4)	Sam Curran (5)
- Player of the series: Jos Buttler (Eng)

The English cricket team toured Australia in October 2022 to play three Twenty20 International (T20I) matches as a preparatory series before the 2022 ICC Men's T20 World Cup and toured again in November 2022 to play three One Day International (ODI) matches. In May 2022, Cricket Australia (CA) confirmed the fixtures for the tour.

England won the first T20I in Perth by 8 runs, Alex Hales top scoring with 84 runs from 51 balls after David Warner had scored 73 from 44 for the hosts. A talking point from the match came in the 17th over of Australia's innings when Matthew Wade appeared to block England bowler Mark Wood from fielding the ball after it had looped up off the top edge of Wade's bat. England captain Jos Buttler opted not to appeal for a dismissal under Law 37 "obstructing the field", citing a long tour and preferring not to risk such an appeal on this occasion. England sealed the series with another 8-run victory in the second T20I, with Dawid Malan's 82 runs from 49 balls helping them recover from a poor start in Canberra. The final T20I was eventually abandoned due to rain after England's innings had been reduced to 12 overs and Australia lost three early wickets in their run chase.

== Squads ==
ODIs		T20Is	
Australia	England	Australia	England
Pat Cummins (c); Sean Abbott; Ashton Agar; Alex Carey (wk); Cameron Green; Josh Hazlewood; Travis Head; Josh Inglis (wk); Marnus Labuschagne; Mitchell Marsh; ~~Glenn Maxwell~~; Riley Meredith; Steve Smith; Mitchell Starc; Marcus Stoinis; David Warner; Adam Zampa	Jos Buttler (c, wk); Moeen Ali; Sam Billings (wk); Sam Curran; Liam Dawson; Chris Jordan; Dawid Malan; Adil Rashid; Jason Roy; Phil Salt (wk); Olly Stone; James Vince; David Willey; Chris Woakes; Luke Wood	Aaron Finch (c); Ashton Agar; Pat Cummins; Tim David; Nathan Ellis; Cameron Green; Josh Hazlewood; Josh Inglis (wk); Mitchell Marsh; Glenn Maxwell; Kane Richardson; Daniel Sams; Steve Smith; Mitchell Starc; Marcus Stoinis; Mitchell Swepson; Matthew Wade (wk); David Warner; Adam Zampa	Jos Buttler (c, wk); Moeen Ali; ~~Jonny Bairstow (wk)~~; Harry Brook; Sam Curran; Alex Hales; Chris Jordan; Liam Livingstone; Dawid Malan; Adil Rashid; Phil Salt (wk); Ben Stokes; Reece Topley; David Willey; Chris Woakes; Mark Wood

England also named Tymal Mills, Richard Gleeson and Liam Dawson as travelling reserves for the T20I series and the T20 World Cup. On the same day as the squad announcement, Jonny Bairstow was ruled out of the tournament after sustaining a possible broken leg while playing golf. On 7 September, Alex Hales was named as Bairstow's replacement in the squad. On 6 October, CA announced the squad for the T20I series with their plan of pre-World Cup squad shuffle between the first and last two T20Is. Glenn Maxwell was ruled out of Australia's ODI squad before the start of the ODI series after suffering a broken leg, with Sean Abbott named as his replacement. Josh Inglis was added to Australia's ODI squad before the second ODI in place of Cameron Green, after which Mitchell Starc was rested for the third ODI and Riley Meredith was added to the squad as a replacement.

== T20I series ==
=== 1st T20I ===
9 October 2022
16:10 (D/N)
Scorecard

England; 6/208 (20 overs)	v	Australia; 9/200 (20 overs)
Alex Hales 84 (51); Nathan Ellis 3/20 (4 overs)		David Warner 73 (44); Mark Wood 3/34 (4 overs)

England won by 8 runs
Perth Stadium, Perth
Umpires: Donovan Koch (Aus) and Sam Nogajski (Aus)
Player of the match: Alex Hales (Eng)

- Australia won the toss and elected to field.

=== 2nd T20I ===
12 October 2022
19:10 (N)
Scorecard

England; 7/178 (20 overs)	v	Australia; 6/170 (20 overs)
Dawid Malan 82 (49); Marcus Stoinis 3/34 (4 overs)		Mitchell Marsh 45 (29); Sam Curran 3/25 (4 overs)

England won by 8 runs
Manuka Oval, Canberra
Umpires: Phillip Gillespie (Aus) and Donovan Koch (Aus)
Player of the match: Dawid Malan (Eng)

- Australia won the toss and elected to field.

=== 3rd T20I ===
14 October 2022
19:10 (N)
Scorecard

England; 2/112 (12 overs)	v	Australia; 3/30 (3.5 overs)
Jos Buttler 65* (41); Pat Cummins 1/23 (3 overs)		Marcus Stoinis 8* (4); Chris Woakes 3/4 (2 overs)

No result
Manuka Oval, Canberra
Umpires: Donovan Koch (Aus) and Sam Nogajski (Aus)

- Australia won the toss and elected to field.
- Australia were set a revised target of 130 runs from 12 overs.
- No further play was possible due to rain.

== ODI series ==
=== 1st ODI ===
17 November 2022
13:50 (D/N)
Scorecard

England; 9/287 (50 overs)	v	Australia; 4/291 (46.5 overs)
Dawid Malan 134 (138); Adam Zampa 3/55 (10 overs)		David Warner 86 (84); David Willey 2/51 (8 overs)

Australia won by 6 wickets
Adelaide Oval, Adelaide
Umpires: Paul Reiffel (Aus) and Paul Wilson (Aus)
Player of the match: Dawid Malan (Eng)

- Australia won the toss and elected to field.
- Luke Wood (Eng) made his ODI debut.
- Pat Cummins captained Australia for the first time in ODIs.

=== 2nd ODI ===
19 November 2022
14:20 (D/N)
Scorecard

Australia; 8/280 (50 overs)	v	England; 208 (38.5 overs)
Steve Smith 94 (114); Adil Rashid 3/57 (10 overs)		Sam Billings 71 (80); Adam Zampa 4/45 (9.5 overs)

Australia won by 72 runs
Sydney Cricket Ground, Sydney
Umpires: Sam Nogajski (Aus) and Rod Tucker (Aus)
Player of the match: Mitchell Starc (Aus)

- Australia won the toss and elected to bat.
- Josh Hazlewood (Aus) and Moeen Ali (Eng) captained their respective sides for the first time in ODIs.

=== 3rd ODI ===
22 November 2022
14:20 (D/N)
Scorecard

Australia; 5/355 (48 overs)	v	England; 142 (31.4 overs)
Travis Head 152 (130); Olly Stone 4/85 (10 overs)		Jason Roy 33 (48); Adam Zampa 4/31 (5.4 overs)

Australia won by 221 runs (DLS method)
Melbourne Cricket Ground, Melbourne
Umpires: Paul Reiffel (Aus) and Paul Wilson (Aus)
Player of the match: Travis Head (Aus)

- England won the toss and elected to field.
- Match reduced to 48 overs per side due to rain.
- England were set a revised target of 364 runs from 48 overs.
- Moeen Ali (Eng) replaced Phil Salt as a concussion substitute.
- David Warner (Aus) became the fastest Australian cricketer to score 6000 runs in ODIs, in terms of innings (139).
- Australia's total was the highest score ever set at the MCG in ODIs.
- This was England's biggest defeat in terms of runs in ODI cricket.
