= Australian cricket team in New Zealand in 2016–17 =

International cricket tour

	New Zealand	Australia
- Dates: 30 January 2017 – 5 February 2017
Captains	Kane Williamson	Aaron Finch

One Day International series
- Results: New Zealand won the 3-match series 2–0
Most runs	Ross Taylor (123)	Marcus Stoinis (188)
Most wickets	Trent Boult (8)	James Faulkner (4); Mitchell Starc (4)

The Australian cricket team toured New Zealand in January and February 2017 to play three One Day Internationals (ODIs).

Australia's captain Steve Smith was ruled out of series after suffering an ankle injury in the final ODI against Pakistan. Matthew Wade was named as Australia's captain in Smith's place and Sam Heazlett was added to the squad as Smith's replacement. However, Wade was ruled out of the first match with a back complaint and Aaron Finch took over as captain. Before the second ODI, Wade was ruled out of series due to back injury and Finch continued to captain in the remaining matches.

New Zealand won the series 2–0, to reclaim the Chappell–Hadlee Trophy.

== Squads ==
New Zealand	Australia
Kane Williamson (c); Tim Southee (vc); ~~Tom Blundell (wk)~~; Trent Boult; Neil Broom; Dean Brownlie; Colin de Grandhomme; Lockie Ferguson; ~~Martin Guptill~~; Matt Henry; Tom Latham (wk); Colin Munro; James Neesham; Mitchell Santner; Ish Sodhi; Ross Taylor	~~Steve Smith (c)~~; ~~Matthew Wade (c, wk)~~; Aaron Finch (c); Pat Cummins; James Faulkner; Peter Handscomb (wk); Josh Hazlewood; Travis Head; Sam Heazlett; Shaun Marsh; Glenn Maxwell; Mitchell Starc; Billy Stanlake; Marcus Stoinis; Adam Zampa

Martin Guptill was ruled out of the second ODI due to a hamstring problem. Dean Brownlie was added into the squad as his cover. Ish Sodhi was added into the squad and Tom Blundell was released from the squad for final ODI. Guptill had not recovered from hamstring injury and was ruled out of the third ODI.

== ODI series ==
=== 1st ODI ===
30 January 2017
11:00
Scorecard

New Zealand; 286/9 (50 overs)	v	Australia; 280 (47 overs)
Neil Broom 73 (75); Marcus Stoinis 3/49 (10 overs)		Marcus Stoinis 146* (117); Mitchell Santner 3/44 (10 overs)

New Zealand won by 6 runs
Eden Park, Auckland
Umpires: Wayne Knights (NZ) and Ruchira Palliyaguruge (SL)
Player of the match: Marcus Stoinis (Aus)

- Australia won the toss and elected to field.
- Sam Heazlett (Aus) made his ODI debut.
- Aaron Finch (Aus) captained his first ODI match after Matthew Wade was ruled out due to back complaint.
- Marcus Stoinis (Aus) took his maiden wicket and scored his maiden century in ODIs. He also became the first Australian to score a century and take three wickets in an ODI match.
- Stoinis' score of 146 not out is the highest by an Australian batting at number seven and the second highest overall. His innings consisted of 11 sixes, the second highest by an Australian batsmen and the highest by an batsmen in a losing side.
- Pat Cummins (Aus) took his 50th wicket in ODIs.
- Josh Hazlewood (Aus) became the first player to be dismissed for a diamond duck in a partnership of more than fifty runs. This was Hazlewood's first dismissal, setting the record for the matches played without being dismissed (33).
- Tom Latham (NZ) equalled New Zealand's record of 5 dismissals as a wicket keeper in an ODI innings (record shared with Gareth Hopkins, Brendon McCullum and Adam Parore).

=== 2nd ODI ===
2 February 2017
14:00 (D/N)
Scorecard

New Zealand	v	Australia

Match abandoned
McLean Park, Napier
Umpires: Chris Brown (NZ) and Kumar Dharmasena (SL)

- No toss.
- The match was abandoned without a ball bowled at 18:45 due to rain and a wet outfield. This was McLean Park's second successive abandoned ODI.

=== 3rd ODI ===
5 February 2017
11:00
Scorecard

New Zealand; 281/9 (50 overs)	v	Australia; 257 (47 overs)
Ross Taylor 107 (101); James Faulkner 3/59 (9 overs)		Aaron Finch 56 (64); Trent Boult 6/33 (10 overs)

New Zealand won by 24 runs
Seddon Park, Hamilton
Umpires: Chris Brown (NZ) and Ruchira Palliyaguruge (SL)
Player of the match: Trent Boult (NZ)

- New Zealand won the toss and elected to bat.
- Ross Taylor equaled Nathan Astle's record for the most ODI hundreds by a New Zealand batsman (16).
