= Australian cricket team in New Zealand in 2025–26 =

International cricket tour

	New Zealand	Australia
- Dates: 1 – 4 October 2025
Captains	Michael Bracewell	Mitchell Marsh

Twenty20 International series
- Results: Australia won the 3-match series 2–0
Most runs	Tim Robinson (119)	Mitchell Marsh (197)
Most wickets	James Neesham (4)	Sean Abbott (3); Josh Hazlewood (3)
- Player of the series: Mitchell Marsh (Aus)

The Australian cricket team toured New Zealand in October 2025 to play the New Zealand cricket team. The tour consisted of three Twenty20 International (T20I) matches. The teams competed for the Chappell–Hadlee Trophy. In June 2025, the New Zealand Cricket (NZC) confirmed the fixtures for the tour, as a part of the 2025–26 home international season. All the matches were played at the Bay Oval in Mount Maunganui, Tauranga.

== Squads ==
New Zealand	Australia
Michael Bracewell (c); Mark Chapman; Devon Conway (wk); Jacob Duffy; Zak Foulkes; Matt Henry; Bevon Jacobs; Kyle Jamieson; Daryl Mitchell; James Neesham; ~~Rachin Ravindra~~; Tim Robinson; Ben Sears; Tim Seifert (wk); Ish Sodhi	Mitchell Marsh (c); Sean Abbott; Xavier Bartlett; Alex Carey (wk); Tim David; Ben Dwarshuis; Josh Hazlewood; Travis Head; ~~Josh Inglis (wk)~~; Matthew Kuhnemann; ~~Glenn Maxwell~~; Mitchell Owen; Josh Philippe; Matthew Short; Marcus Stoinis; Adam Zampa

On 19 September, Josh Inglis was ruled out of the series due to a calf strain, with Alex Carey added to squad as his replacement. On 30 September, Glenn Maxwell was ruled out of the series with a fractured right wrist and was replaced by Josh Philippe.

On 1 October, Rachin Ravindra was ruled out of the series due to a facial laceration, with James Neesham added to squad as his replacement.

== T20I series ==
=== 1st T20I ===
1 October 2025
19:15 (N)
Scorecard

New Zealand; 181/6 (20 overs)	v	Australia; 185/4 (16.3 overs)
Tim Robinson 106* (66); Ben Dwarshuis 2/40 (4 overs)		Mitchell Marsh 85 (43); Matt Henry 2/43 (4 overs)

Australia won by 6 wickets
Bay Oval, Mount Maunganui
Umpires: Chris Brown (NZ) and Shaun Haig (NZ)
Player of the match: Mitchell Marsh (Aus)

- Australia won the toss and elected to field.
- Tim Robinson (NZ) scored his maiden century in T20Is.

=== 2nd T20I ===
3 October 2025
19:15 (N)
Scorecard

Australia; 16/1 (2.1 overs)	v	New Zealand
Mitchell Marsh 9* (8); Jacob Duffy 1/13 (1 over)

No result
Bay Oval, Mount Maunganui
Umpires: Cory Black (NZ) and Wayne Knights (NZ)

- New Zealand won the toss and elected to field.
- The match was reduced to 9 overs per side due to rain.
- No further play was possible due to rain.

=== 3rd T20I ===
4 October 2025
19:15 (N)
Scorecard

New Zealand; 156/9 (20 overs)	v	Australia; 160/7 (18 overs)
Tim Seifert 48 (35); Sean Abbott 3/25 (4 overs)		Mitchell Marsh 103* (52); James Neesham 4/26 (4 overs)

Australia won by 3 wickets
Bay Oval, Mount Maunganui
Umpires: Chris Brown (NZ) and Shaun Haig (NZ)
Player of the match: Mitchell Marsh (Aus)

- Australia won the toss and elected to field.
- Mitchell Marsh (Aus) scored his maiden century in T20Is.
