= New Zealand cricket team in Australia in 2004–05 =

The New Zealand national cricket team toured Australia in the 2004–05 season and played 2 Test matches against Australia.

== Test series ==
Australia won the Test series 2–0 with convincing wins in both matches.

Glenn McGrath was named man of the series after hitting his first half century in the First Test and took 9 wickets over the two matches.

=== 1st Test ===
18–21 November 2004
(5-day match)
Scorecard

New Zealand	v	Australia
353 (117.3 overs); JDP Oram 126* (178); MS Kasprowicz 4/90 (28 overs)		585 (153.5 overs); MJ Clarke 141 (200); CS Martin 5/152 (39.5 overs)
76 (36.2 overs); NJ Astle 17 (39); SK Warne 4/15 (10.2 overs)

Australia won by an innings and 156 runs
Brisbane Cricket Ground, Woolloongabba, Brisbane
Umpires: Aleem Dar (PAK) and SA Bucknor (WI)
Player of the match: MJ Clarke (AUS)

- New Zealand won the toss and elected to bat.
- The match was scheduled for five days but completed in four.

=== 2nd Test ===
26–30 November 2004
(5-day match)
Scorecard

Australia	v	New Zealand
575/8dec (155.2 overs); JL Langer 215 (368); DL Vettori 5/152 (55.2 overs)		251 (88.1 overs); SP Fleming 83 (161); GD McGrath 4/66 (20.1 overs)
139/2dec (56 overs); ML Hayden 54 (132); DL Vettori 1/35 (18 overs)		250 (82.3 overs); DL Vettori 59 (78); GD McGrath 2/32 (12 overs)

Australia won by 213 runs
Adelaide Oval, Adelaide
Umpires: SA Bucknor (WI) and DR Shepherd (ENG)
Player of the match: JL Langer (AUS)

- Australia won the toss and elected to bat.

== One Day Internationals ==
Australia and New Zealand played an ODI series which ended 1–1 with one game abandoned due to rain. This was the inaugural Chappell–Hadlee Trophy.

New Zealand's victory at Melbourne was the first win by New Zealand against Australia in almost 3 years. The match at Brisbane was abandoned without a ball being bowled due to heavy rain, preventing the series decider from taking place.

=== 1st ODI ===
5 December 2004 (D/N)
Scorecard

Australia; 246/9 (50 overs)	v	New Zealand; 247/6 (49.4 overs)
AC Gilchrist 68 (54); DL Vettori 3/31 (10 overs)		NJ Astle 70 (102); DS Lehmann 2/35 (9 overs)

New Zealand won by 4 wickets
Telstra Dome, Melbourne
Umpires: SJ Davis (AUS) and RE Koertzen (SA)
Player of the match: HJH Marshall (NZ)

- New Zealand won the toss and elected to field.

The first match at Telstra Dome in Melbourne on 5 December was won by New Zealand and was considered a thrillingly close affair. After a decidedly unsuccessful Test series against Australia, a New Zealand victory was considered unlikely, with bookmakers odds heavily favouring the home side.

Australia began proceedings with opening partners Adam Gilchrist and Matthew Hayden reaching 50 runs before the end of the seventh over. This partnership was ended in spectacular fashion, with Hayden attempting a strong pull shot which looked to be heading straight for the boundary. However, Mathew Sinclair, at full sprint and diving to his left, pulled off a marvellous wrong-handed catch which has been heralded as one of the best of the decade (competing with Australian Glenn McGrath's catch in the 2002–03 Ashes against England). Gilchrist put in a typical performance, making a quick 68 runs off only 54 balls, before being dispatched by an impressive Chris Cairns delivery which bowled him (a feat Cairns was later to repeat twice more, taking both Michael Clarke's and Brett Lee's wicket in the same manner). Cairns' insertion into the bowling attack sparked a collapse in the Australian middle order, which in the space of 18 balls lost 4 wickets for just 10 runs. The bowling of Cairns and Daniel Vettori wreaked havoc with the Australian batsmen, with personal figures of 3/39 and 3/31 respectively. Darren Lehmann second top-scored with 50 runs and he, together with the struggling efforts of the lower order batsmen, brought Australia to a respectable 9/246 after 50 overs.

New Zealand began the run chase in a tenuous fashion, losing the wicket of captain Stephen Fleming LBW for a duck after less than one minute. However, the 1/0 figure was in the next two hours to become 1/128, with opening batsman Nathan Astle and Mathew Sinclair's partnership proving to be formidable. Sinclair was then run out by Andrew Symonds, and Astle's wicket fell in the following over for 70 runs, which included a magnificent six. The breakthrough was consolidated with the loss of Scott Styris' wicket soon after for just 5 runs, but Hamish Marshall put up a performance of 50 not-out from 52 balls, and together with quick scores of 24 runs off 22 balls from Jacob Oram, 14 runs off 11 balls from Chris Cairns, and 20 not out off 13 balls from Brendon McCullum, helped New Zealand reach the target of 247 with just two balls left to be bowled.

Hamish Marshall's impressive and innovative innings of 50 not-out earned him man of the match.

=== 2nd ODI ===
8 December 2004 (D/N)
Scorecard

Australia; 261/7 (50 overs)	v	New Zealand; 244 (47.1 overs)
AC Gilchrist 60 (48); KD Mills 2/49 (10 overs)		CL Cairns 50 (40); GB Hogg 3/45 (8 overs)

Australia won by 17 runs
Sydney Cricket Ground, Sydney
Umpires: RE Koertzen (SA) and PD Parker (AUS)
Player of the match: GB Hogg (AUS)

- Australia won the toss and elected to bat.

The second match at Sydney Cricket Ground on 8 December was won by Australia, and was similar to the first in that Australia set a competitive total and New Zealand put up a very good chase, making for another close finish.

Adam Gilchrist opened in his usual quick-hitting style, making 60 runs from 48 balls, including nine fours and one six. At one stage, in the course of three overs, Gilchrist piled on 41 runs. His partner Hayden contributed one run during this time. Chris Cairns was brought into the attack to attempt to slow the run rate, but it took the bowling of Scott Styris to remove Gilchrist from the batting crease, caught by Nathan Astle. The new batsman Ricky Ponting with Hayden put together a useful partnership to be 1/140, before Ponting was dismissed after making 32. It was in Ponting's innings that New Zealand's veteran bowler Chris Harris, in saving four runs, dove to his left, landed awkwardly on his shoulder and tore his rotator cuff, in his 250th ODI. Ponting's dismissal proved to be the precursor to another middle order collapse for Australia, for Hayden was dismissed just a few minutes later for 43, and in even shorter order Damien Martyn was dismissed for 5 and Andrew Symonds for his second consecutive duck. Australia had lost four wickets for eight runs and looked to be in some bother, which was exacerbated five overs later with the loss of Michael Clarke for just six runs. At six wickets down though, Darren Lehmann and Brad Hogg steadied and put on a partnership of 74 runs before Darren Lehmann was run out with two overs remaining at 7/235. The incoming batsman Brett Lee put on 10 quick runs and Brad Hogg a further 16 to have Australia at 7/261 after 50 overs.

The New Zealand run chase was every bit as exciting as it had been in the first match. Nathan Astle followed up his 70 runs in the first match with just 11, beaten by the bowling of Australian speedster Brett Lee. Sinclair was the next to go, scoring 17 runs before edging a Jason Gillespie ball to Hayden in the slips. This was the beginning of a New Zealand collapse, with Scott Styris the next to depart with 5 runs, and then Stephen Fleming who had successfully taken on Lee, scoring 34 runs from 44 balls, falling to Brad Hogg's first delivery, given out LBW. Jacob Oram then fell for two runs, followed by Hamish Marshall for just 9, the latter falling victim to a quick ball from Lee which took his off stump.

New Zealand had lost five wickets for 23 runs, but a remarkable revival was to come, which perhaps would have won the match were it not for a dubious decision going against them.

Chris Cairns and Brendon McCullum found themselves in the precarious position of being at 6/86 after 22 overs, needing 262 for victory. Cairns hit fast and hard, knocking 50 runs from 40 balls, before falling victim to Gillespie's bowling, attempting another boundary. Three overs later, McCullum was the recipient of a ball from Brad Hogg which he attempted to block, getting a thick edge of his bat to the ball before it struck his pads. Upon appeal however, umpire Peter Parker gave McCullum out, a clearly incorrect decision.

Two bowlers, Kyle Mills and Daniel Vettori, were then the batsmen for New Zealand, and had the task of getting nearly 100 runs in less than 13 overs, with only the shoulder sling-sporting Chris Harris left to bat if either of them was dismissed. They took to this task with an amazing showcase of batting prowess, the likes of which would have been impressive for opening batsmen, let alone bottom-order batsmen.

Initially, Vettori took control with competent batting and got to 27 runs at the beginning of the 42nd over, with Mills having taken a more passive role at 7 runs. This role was soon to be reversed. Mills hit four sixes in four consecutive balls, over the space of two overs, in a display considered to be worthy of any current top batsman. In the following over, now needing only a run per ball bowled, Vettori was run out by a direct throw from Ricky Ponting, to have New Zealand 9/236.

Chris Harris bravely took to the batting crease with a runner, Hamish Marshall. Looking ungainly and in considerable discomfort due to his previously incurred injury, he managed 4 runs from 6 balls before being beaten by a McGrath yorker which took his middle stump, leaving Mills at 44 not-out from 26 balls, and New Zealand all out for 244.

Brad Hogg was named Man of the match.

=== 3rd ODI ===
10 December 2004 (D/N)
Scorecard

Australia	v	New Zealand

Match abandoned
Brisbane Cricket Ground, Woolloongabba, Brisbane
Umpires: RE Koertzen (SA) and SJA Taufel (AUS)

The third match at Brisbane Cricket Ground on 10 December, which was meant to be the series decider, was rained off, and the Trophy shared after a 1–1 series tie.

Daniel Vettori was named Man of the Series after two impressive performances, with both the bat and the ball.

== External sources ==
- CricketArchive
- New Zealand in Australia 2004
