= Lockie Ferguson =

New Zealand cricketer (born 1991)

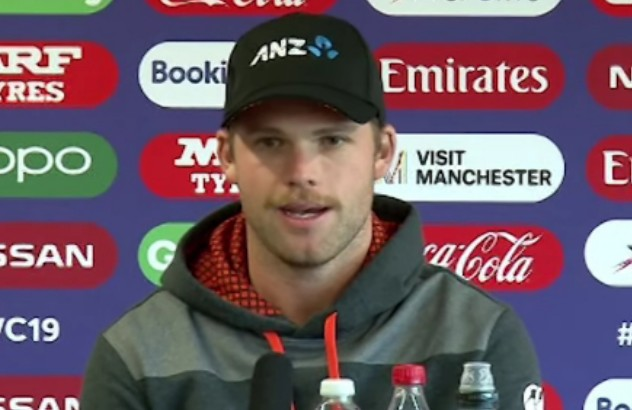
- Ferguson in a press-conference during the 2019 Cricket World Cup.

Personal information
- Full name: Lachlan Hammond Ferguson
- Born: 13 June 1991 (age 35); Auckland, New Zealand
- Height: 6 ft 1 in (185 cm)
- Batting: Right-handed
- Bowling: Right-arm fast
- Role: Bowler

International information
- National side: New Zealand (2016–present)
- Only Test (cap 276): 12 December 2019 v Australia
- ODI debut (cap 190): 4 December 2016 v Australia
- Last ODI: 15 November 2023 v India
- ODI shirt no.: 69 (formerly 87)
- T20I debut (cap 71): 3 January 2017 v Bangladesh
- Last T20I: 24 October 2026 v India
- T20I shirt no.: 69 (formerly 87)

Domestic team information
- Years: Team
- 2012/13–present: Auckland
- 2017: Rising Pune Supergiant
- 2018: Derbyshire
- 2019–2021,2023: Kolkata Knight Riders
- 2021: Yorkshire
- 2021: Manchester Originals
- 2022: Gujarat Titans
- 2023: Welsh Fire
- 2024: Royal Challengers Bangalore
- 2024/25: Sydney Thunder
- 2025–present: Punjab Kings
- 2025: Trent Rockets
- 2024-present: Washington Freedom
- 2026: Welsh Fire

Career statistics
Competition	Test	ODI	T20I	FC
Matches	1	65	56	46
Runs scored	1	122	38	505
Batting average	–	7.17	4.22	13.64
100s/50s	0/0	0/0	0/0	0/0
Top score	1*	19	14	41
Balls bowled	66	3,300	1,145	7,297
Wickets	0	99	77	165
Bowling average	–	31.55	18.51	24.52
5 wickets in innings	–	1	1	11
10 wickets in match	–	0	0	1
Best bowling	–	5/45	5/21	7/34
Catches/stumpings	0/–	14/–	18/–	16/–
Medal record
Men's Cricket
Representing New Zealand
ICC Cricket World Cup
Runner-up	2019 England and Wales
ICC T20 World Cup
Runner-up	2026 India & Sri Lanka
- Source: ESPNcricinfo, 24 October 2026

Lachlan Hammond Ferguson (born 13 June 1991) is a New Zealand cricketer who represents the New Zealand national team and plays first-class cricket for Auckland. He is capable of bowling at speeds in excess of 90 mph, his fastest being 157.3 km/h (97.7 mph). Known for his searing pace and lethal bouncers, he is one of the world's fastest bowlers to have ever played the game. He was a part of the New Zealand squad to finish as runners-up at the 2019 Cricket World Cup.

== Domestic and T20 franchise career ==
In February 2017, he was bought by the Rising Pune Supergiants team for the 2017 Indian Premier League. In December 2018, he was bought by the Kolkata Knight Riders in the player auction for the 2019 Indian Premier League. In November 2019, during the 2019–20 Plunket Shield season, Ferguson took his 150th first-class wicket. In March 2021, Ferguson was signed by Yorkshire County Cricket Club ahead of the 2021 T20 Blast competition in England.

In the 2022 Indian Premier League auction, Ferguson was bought by the Gujarat Titans.

In 2024, Ferguson joined Washington Freedom in Major League Cricket and was part of their title-winning squad that season, remaining with the franchise thereafter.

== International career ==
In November 2016, he was added to New Zealand's One Day International (ODI) squad for their series against Australia. He made his ODI debut for New Zealand against Australia on 4 December 2016.

On 3 January 2017 he made his Twenty20 International (T20I) debut for New Zealand against Bangladesh. In the match he took two wickets with his first two deliveries, only the second player to do so.

In November 2017, he was added to New Zealand's Test squad for their series against the West Indies, but he did not play. In May 2018, he was one of twenty players to be awarded a new contract for the 2018–19 season by New Zealand Cricket.

In April 2019, he was named in New Zealand's squad for the 2019 Cricket World Cup. On 5 June 2019, in the match against Bangladesh, Ferguson took his 50th wicket in ODIs. Following the World Cup, the International Cricket Council (ICC) named Ferguson as the rising star of the squad. He was named in the Team of the Tournament by the ICC.

In November 2019, Ferguson was named in New Zealand's Test squad for their home series against England and their tour to Australia. Ahead of the first Test, Ferguson was released from the New Zealand squad to participate in the Ford Trophy. However, he was recalled into New Zealand's Test squad for the second match of the series. He made his Test debut for New Zealand, against Australia, on 12 December 2019.

On 27 November 2020, in the first T20I against the West Indies, Ferguson took his first five-wicket haul in T20I cricket. In August 2021, Ferguson was named in New Zealand's squad for the 2021 ICC Men's T20 World Cup. However, he was later ruled out of the tournament following a calf tear.

On 2 September 2023, in the absence of regular captain Kane Williamson and stand-in captain Tom Latham, Ferguson was named the captain of the New Zealand cricket team for the three-match ODI series against Bangladesh.

In May 2024, he was named in New Zealand's squad for the 2024 ICC Men's T20 World Cup tournament. On 17 June 2024, in a group stage match against Papua New Guinea, Ferguson returned figures of 3/0 in four overs, becoming the first player to bowl four maidens in a Men's T20 World Cup match, and 2nd bowler after Saad Bin Zafar in T20Is. On 18 February 2025, Ferguson was ruled out of the Champions Trophy due to a foot injury sustained in a warm-up match against Afghanistan. He was sent home and replaced by Kyle Jamieson. Head coach Gary Stead expressed disappointment, emphasizing Ferguson's value to the team.
