= Daniel Vettori =

New Zealand cricketer (born 1979)

Daniel Vettori ONZM
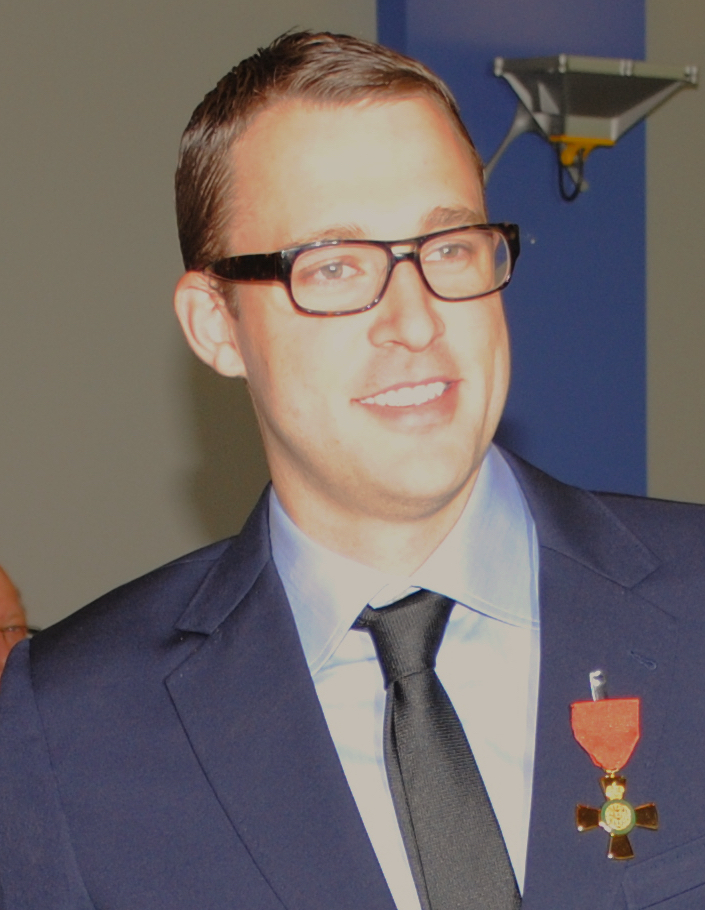
- Vettori in 2011 at Government House, Auckland

Personal information
- Full name: Daniel Luca Vettori
- Born: 27 January 1979 (age 47); Auckland, New Zealand
- Batting: Left-handed
- Bowling: Slow left-arm orthodox
- Role: All-rounder

International information
- National side: New Zealand (1997–2015)
- Test debut (cap 200): 6 February 1997 v England
- Last Test: 26 November 2014 v Pakistan
- ODI debut (cap 101): 25 March 1997 v Sri Lanka
- Last ODI: 29 March 2015 v Australia
- ODI shirt no.: 11
- T20I debut (cap 25): 12 September 2007 v Kenya
- Last T20I: 5 December 2014 v Pakistan
- T20I shirt no.: 11

Domestic team information
- Years: Team
- 1996/97–2014/15: Northern Districts
- 2003: Nottinghamshire
- 2006: Warwickshire
- 2008–2010: Delhi Daredevils
- 2009/10: Queensland
- 2011–2012: Royal Challengers Bangalore
- 2011/12–2014/15: Brisbane Heat
- 2014–2015: Jamaica Tallawahs

Head coaching information
- Years: Team
- 2014-2018: Royal Challengers Bangalore
- 2021: Barbados Tridents
- 2021-2025: Birmingham phoenix
- 2024-: Sunrisers Hyderabad
- 2026-: Sunrisers Leeds

Career statistics
Competition	Test	ODI	FC	LA
Matches	113	295	174	365
Runs scored	4,531	2,253	6,695	3,549
Batting average	30.00	17.33	29.62	20.16
100s/50s	6/23	0/4	9/34	2/10
Top score	140	83	140	138
Balls bowled	28,814	14,060	41,258	17,628
Wickets	362	305	565	387
Bowling average	34.36	31.71	31.82	30.98
5 wickets in innings	20	2	33	2
10 wickets in match	3	0	3	0
Best bowling	7/87	5/7	7/87	5/7
Catches/stumpings	58/–	88/–	98/–	121/–
Medal record
Men's Cricket
Representing New Zealand
ICC Cricket World Cup
Runner-up	2015 Australia and New Zealand
Commonwealth Games
Bronze medal – third place	1998 Kuala Lumpur
- Source: ESPNcricinfo, 13 February 2016

Daniel Luca Vettori ONZM (born 27 January 1979) is a New Zealand cricket coach and former cricketer who played for the New Zealand national cricket team. He was the 200th player to win their Test cricket cap for New Zealand and an inductee in the New Zealand Cricket Hall of Fame. He is currently an assistant coach of the Australia men's national cricket team.

Vettori was the youngest male player to have represented New Zealand in Test cricket, making his debut in February 1997 at the age of 18. He captained New Zealand between 2007 and 2011 and is New Zealand's most-capped Test cricketer and One Day International cricketer, with 112 Test caps and 291 ODI caps. (Note: As well as these matches, Vettori also played one Test match and four One Day Internationals for World XIs selected by the International Cricket Council.) A bowling all-rounder, Vettori was the eighth player in Test cricket history to take 300 wickets and score 3,000 runs.

A slow left-arm orthodox spin bowler, Vettori was known for his accuracy, flight and guile rather than prodigious turn. He was also a part of the New Zealand squad to finish as runners-up at the 2015 Cricket World Cup; after which he announced his retirement from all forms of cricket. He has since coached in a variety of roles.

== Career ==
Vettori was born in Auckland and brought up in Hamilton, attending Marian School and later St. Paul's Collegiate School. He was initially a medium-pace bowler, but slowly transitioned to bowl left arm orthodox spin deliveries. He made his senior debut for Northern Districts in 1996/97 and his international debut during England's 1997 tour of New Zealand at the age of 18, at the time the youngest man to play Test cricket for New Zealand. He took his first international five-wicket haul against Sri Lanka in March of the same year.

He was among a very small minority of international sports stars to wear prescription spectacles while playing sport, and only one of very few cricketers in the modern era to play Test cricket with spectacles.

=== Captaincy ===
Prior to becoming captain on a permanent basis in 2007 after the retirement of Former Team Captain Stephen Fleming, Vettori had captained New Zealand in ODI cricket on occasion. He captained New Zealand at the inaugural Twenty20 World Championship in South Africa and subsequently was appointed the team's captain in all formats.

Vettori's captaincy began with a losing Test series in England and attracted some criticism during the ODI series which followed. He had shouted from the balcony at The Oval following a controversial run out and later refused to shake hands with the England team after the match. This approach contrasted with Fleming's more languid, laid back style.

Vettori stood down from the captaincy and retired from One day International and Twenty20 International cricket after the 2011 World Cup. He was recalled into the ODI team for the 2013 ICC Champions Trophy and the 2015 Cricket World Cup, by which time he had retired from Test cricket, his final Test match was as an emergency injury replacement against Pakistan in November 2014.

=== Bowling records ===
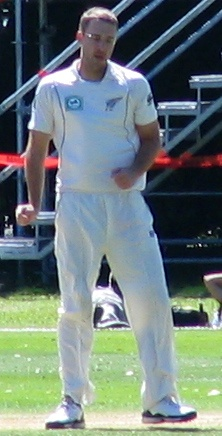
Vettori playing a Test match at the University of Otago Oval during Pakistan's tour of New Zealand in 2009

Vettori took his 300th Test wicket on New Zealand's tour of Sri Lanka in 2009, becoming only the second New Zealander to do so, joining Richard Hadlee. As of August 2022 his 362 Test wickets lies second only to Hadlee and he is New Zealand's leading One Day International wicket-taker with 297 dismissals for the national team.

Vettori was the first left-arm spin bowler to take more than 300 wickets in both Test matches and One Day Internationals. (Note: As well as 297 ODI wickets for New Zealand, Vettori took seven wickets in the three ODIs he played for a World XI for a total of 305 ODI wickets.) He was the youngest man to take 100 Test wickets, doing so by the age of 21. In 2005, 2008 and 2010 he was named in the World ODI XI by the International Cricket Council and was named in the team of the tournament for the 2015 Cricket World Cup.

Vettori took 20 five-wicket hauls in Test matches, including taking ten wickets in a match three times. His best innings figures were achieved in Auckland in 1999–2000 against Australia where he took 7/87; he finished with career best-match figures of 12/149, the second best by a New Zealander at the time. As of August 2022 these match figures remain the third-best ever by a New Zealander, with only Ajaz Patel and Richard Hadlee having taken better figures in a match. He also took 12 wickets against Bangladesh 2004 and 10 against Sri Lanka in 2006. He took two five-wicket hauls in One Day International matches.

List of Test match five-wicket hauls taken by Daniel Vettori
No.	Date	Ground	Against	In.	O	R	W	Ref
1	14 March 1997	Hamilton	Sri Lanka	4	29.2	84	5	
2	10 June 1998	Colombo	Sri Lanka	3	33	64	6	
3	22 October 1999	Kanpur	India	2	55.1	127	6	
4	11 March 2000	Auckland	Australia	1	25	62	5	
5	11 March 2000	Auckland	Australia	3	35	87	7	
6	22 November 2001	Hobart	Australia	1	36	138	5	
7	30 November 2001	Perth	Australia	2	34.4	87	6	
8	19 October 2004	Dhaka	Bangladesh	3	22	28	6	
9	26 October 2004	Chittagong	Bangladesh	2	32.2	70	6	
10	26 October 2004	Chittagong	Bangladesh	3	28.2	100	6	
11	26 November 2004	Adelaide	Australia	1	55.2	152	5	
12	10 March 2005	Christchurch	Australia	2	40.2	106	5	
13	15 December 2006	Wellington	Sri Lanka	3	42.3	130	7	
14	15 May 2008	Lord's, London	England	2	22.3	69	5	
15	23 May 2008	Manchester	England	2	31	66	5	
16	17 October 2008	Chittagong	Bangladesh	1	36	59	5	
17	25 October 2008	Dhaka	Bangladesh	2	19	66	5	
18	11 December 2008	Dunedin	West Indies	2	25	56	6	
19	12 November 2010	Hyderabad	India	2	49.4	135	5	
20	1 November 2011	Bulawayo	Zimbabwe	2	43	70	5	

List of ODI five-wicket hauls taken by Daniel Vettori
No.	Date	Ground	Against	In.	O	R	W	Ref
1	10 July 2004	Lord's, London	West Indies	2	9.2	30	5	
2	31 December 2007	Queenstown	Bangladesh	1	6	7	5	

=== Batting ===
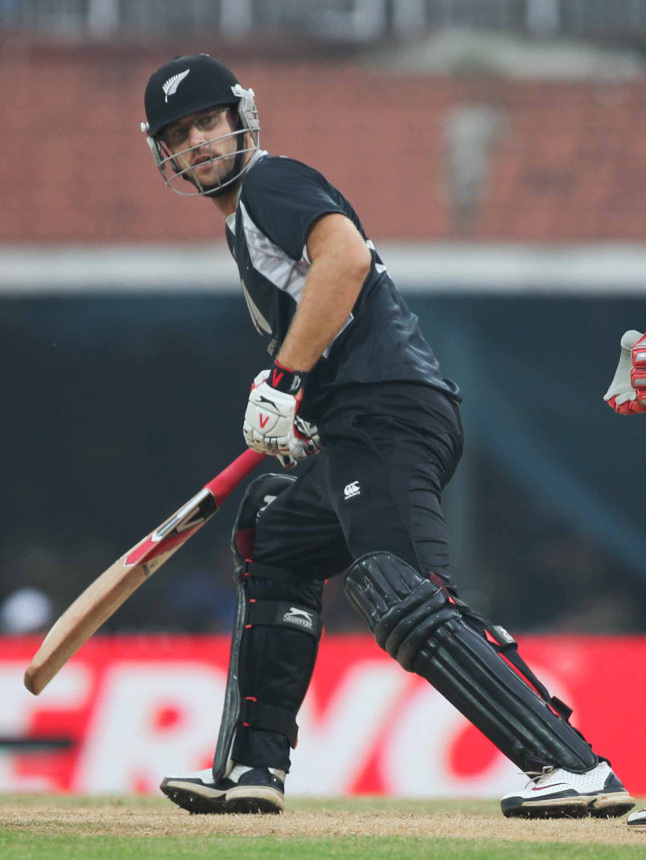
Vettori playing an ODI during India's tour of New Zealand in 2010

Vettori developed into a useful lower-order batsman, scoring more than 4,500 Test runs, including six centuries. Although it took him 47 Tests to score his first 1,000 runs at an average of 17.24, the second thousand took just 22 Tests at an average of 42.52 per innings. His highest Test score of 140 came against Sri Lanka at Singhalese Sports Club Cricket Ground, Colombo in August 2009.

List of Test match centuries scored by Daniel Vettori
No.	Score	Opponents	Venue	Date	Ref
1	137 not out	Pakistan	Hamilton	19 December 2003	
2	127	Zimbabwe	Harare	7 August 2005	
3	118	India	Hamilton	18 March 2009	
4	140	Sri Lanka	Colombo	26 August 2009	
5	134	Pakistan	Napier	11 December 2009	
6	110	Pakistan	Wellington	15 January 2011	

=== Coaching career ===
Vettori was head coach of Royal Challengers Bangalore in the Indian Premier League from 2014 to 2018. In July 2019, he was appointed as the head coach of the Dublin Chiefs in the first season of the Euro T20 Slam cricket tournament; the tournament was later cancelled. The same month, he became the spin bowling coach for the Bangladesh national team.

In August 2021, Vettori was appointed as the head coach of the Caribbean Premier League franchise Barbados Royals.

In May 2022, Vettori was appointed an assistant coach of the Australia men's national team. He remained in the role in 2023.

In August 2023, Vettori was appointed as the head coach of Sunrisers Hyderabad in the Indian Premier League.

== Personal life ==
Vettori is of Italian origin. He married Mary O'Carroll in 2007; the couple have three children. He moved from Hamilton to Auckland after his marriage but continued to play for Northern Districts throughout his career. Vettori was made an Officer of the New Zealand Order of Merit in the 2011 Queen's Birthday Honours, for services to cricket. Vettori is the first cousin of David Hill, a rugby union player who played in one Test for the All Blacks.

A biography of Vettori entitled Turning Point was published in August 2008.

== Notes ==
Sporting positions
Preceded by Stephen Fleming	New Zealand national cricket captain 2007–2011	Succeeded by Ross Taylor
