= Ish Sodhi =

New Zealand cricketer (born 1992)

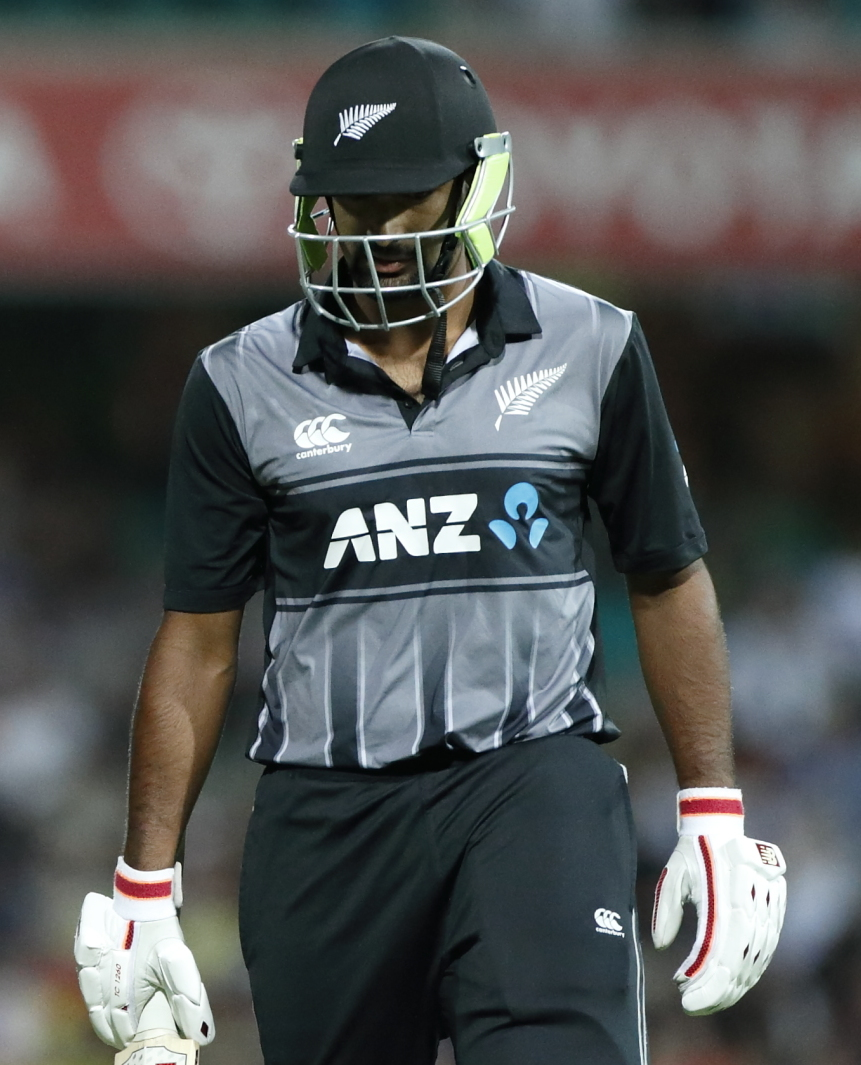
- Sodhi in 2018

Personal information
- Full name: Inderbir Singh Sodhi
- Born: 31 October 1992 (age 34); Ludhiana, Punjab, India
- Nickname: Ish
- Height: 1.85 m (6 ft 1 in)
- Batting: Right-handed
- Bowling: Right-arm leg break
- Role: Bowler

International information
- National side: New Zealand (2013–present)
- Test debut (cap 262): 9 October 2013 v Bangladesh
- Last Test: 1 November 2024 v India
- ODI debut (cap 187): 2 August 2015 v Zimbabwe
- Last ODI: 19 November 2024 v Sri Lanka
- ODI shirt no.: 61
- T20I debut (cap 64): 5 July 2014 v West Indies
- Last T20I: 2 May 2026 v Bangladesh
- T20I shirt no.: 61

Domestic team information
- Years: Team
- 2012/13–2021/22: Northern Districts
- 2016/17: Adelaide Strikers
- 2017–2018: Nottinghamshire
- 2018–2019: Rajasthan Royals
- 2018: Jamaica Tallawahs
- 2020: St Kitts and Nevis Patriots
- 2021: Worcestershire
- 2022: Welsh Fire
- 2022/23–present: Canterbury
- 2023: Somerset

Career statistics
Competition	Test	ODI	T20I	FC
Matches	21	54	142	104
Runs scored	561	210	243	2,945
Batting average	20.77	9.54	8.67	21.97
100s/50s	0/4	0/0	0/0	1/14
Top score	65*	35	33	108*
Balls bowled	4,043	2,557	2,792	19,042
Wickets	58	64	165	328
Bowling average	43.10	36.71	23.01	34.15
5 wickets in innings	1	1	0	17
10 wickets in match	0	0	0	2
Best bowling	6/86	6/39	4/12	7/30
Catches/stumpings	11/–	14/–	41/–	40/–
Medal record
Men's Cricket
Representing New Zealand
ICC Cricket World Cup
Runner-up	2019 England and Wales
ICC T20 World Cup
Runner-up	2021 UAE & Oman
Runner-up	2026 India & Sri Lanka

Inderbir Singh "Ish" Sodhi (born 31 October 1992) is a New Zealand cricketer who represents the New Zealand national cricket team in all formats, and Canterbury in domestic cricket. He bowls right-arm leg spin, and bats right-handed. He reached the no.1 ranking for T20I bowlers in January 2018, jumping from no.10 at the end of the previous year. He was a part of the New Zealand squad to finish as runners-up at the 2019 Cricket World Cup.

== Early life and education ==
Sodhi was born in Ludhiana, India into a Punjabi Sikh family. His grandmother hails from Lahore in Pakistan pre-partition. He moved to Papatoetoe, New Zealand, with his family when he was four years old. He attended Papatoetoe High School.

== Domestic and T20 career ==
Sodhi made his debut for Northern Districts in the 2012–13 Plunket Shield season.

In 2017, Sodhi was not named in the Test squad against Bangladesh, which enabled him to play for Adelaide Strikers as an injury replacement for Chris Jordan. On 18 January, in his third game for the Strikers, he ended the match with figures of 6/11 off 3.3 overs to win the match for the Strikers and Man of the Match. These are the second-best figures in Big Bash history after Lasith Malinga's 6/7 from 4 overs between the Melbourne Stars and Perth Scorchers.

He was the leading wicket-taker in the 2018–19 Plunket Shield season, with 36 dismissals in seven matches. He was released by the Rajasthan Royals ahead of the 2020 IPL auction. In July 2020, he was named in the St Kitts & Nevis Patriots squad for the 2020 Caribbean Premier League. After 10 seasons with Northern Districts, Sodhi moved to Canterbury in New Zealand domestic competitions from the 2022/2023 season onwards.

In June 2023, Sodhi joined Somerset for their Vitality Blast campaign to fill gaps in the squad left by the injuries of Peter Siddle and Roelof van der Merwe. He took three wickets in the final helping Somerset win by 14 runs.

== International career ==
His international debut for New Zealand came in a Test match against Bangladesh during New Zealand's 2013 tour of Bangladesh. He made his Twenty20 International debut against the West Indies in July 2014. In November 2014, Sodhi was selected for a three-test series against Pakistan cricket team. In the first Test, he scored 63, a personal best and the best score by a New Zealand number-ten batsman in Test cricket. Sodhi made his One Day International debut for New Zealand against Zimbabwe on 2 August 2015.

In May 2018, he was one of the twenty players to be awarded a new contract for the 2018–19 season by New Zealand Cricket. In April 2019, he was named in New Zealand's squad for the 2019 Cricket World Cup. In August 2021, Sodhi was named in New Zealand's squad for the 2021 ICC Men's T20 World Cup.

In December 2022, Sodhi was recalled in New Zealand's Test squad after 4 years, for their tour to Pakistan. In the first Test, he picked up his maiden five-wicket haul in Test cricket, besides scoring his career best 65 runs in the first innings.

In May 2024, he was named in New Zealand’s squad for the 2024 ICC Men's T20 World Cup tournament.

In October 2025 in a match against Australia, Sodhi became New Zealand's most capped men's player ever in Twenty20 internationals, appearing in his 127th match.

== Personal life ==
Sodhi is married to Angelina van Roosmalen. The couple have a daughter.
