= Josh Hazlewood =

Australian cricketer (born 1991)

- Hazlewood in 2026

Personal information
- Full name: Josh Reginald Hazlewood
- Born: 8 January 1991 (age 35); Tamworth, New South Wales, Australia
- Nickname: Hoff; Bendemeer Bullet
- Height: 196 cm (6 ft 5 in)
- Batting: Left-handed
- Bowling: Right-arm fast-medium
- Role: Bowler

International information
- National side: Australia (2010–present)
- Test debut (cap 440): 17 December 2014 v India
- Last Test: 27 October 2026 v South Africa
- ODI debut (cap 183): 22 June 2010 v England
- Last ODI: 27 September 2026 v South Africa
- ODI shirt no.: 38
- T20I debut (cap 62): 13 February 2013 v West Indies
- Last T20I: 31 October 2025 v India
- T20I shirt no.: 38

Domestic team information
- Years: Team
- 2008–present: New South Wales
- 2011–2020: Sydney Sixers
- 2020–2021: Chennai Super Kings
- 2022–present: Royal Challengers Bengaluru

Career statistics
Competition	Test	ODI	T20I	FC
Matches	81	99	60	124
Runs scored	586	137	29	939
Batting average	11.26	13.70	9.66	10.91
100s/50s	0/0	0/0	0/0	0/0
Top score	39	23*	13*	43*
Balls bowled	16214	5,152	1,348	23744
Wickets	313	148	79	459
Bowling average	24.10	27.67	21.26	23.95
5 wickets in innings	15	3	0	17
10 wickets in match	0	0	0	0
Best bowling	6/49	6/52	4/12	6/35
Catches/stumpings	32/–	33/–	13/–	48/–
Medal record
Men's cricket
Representing Australia
ICC Cricket World Cup
Winner	2015 Australia and New Zealand
Winner	2023 India
ICC T20 World Cup
Winner	2021 UAE and Oman
ICC World Test Championship
Winner	2021–2023
Runner-up	2023–2025
U19 World Cup
Winner	2010 New Zealand
- Source: ESPNcricinfo, 1 November 2026

Josh Reginald Hazlewood (born 8 January 1991) is an Australian international cricketer. He is a pace bowler known for his accuracy and has been compared to former Australian paceman Glenn McGrath. He has captained Australia in an ODI and served as a Test vice-captain after the 2018 Australian ball-tampering scandal, following which Australia's then captain Steve Smith and vice-captain David Warner had stood down. He won multiple ICC tournaments with the Australian team: the 2015 Cricket World Cup, the 2021 T20 World Cup and the 2023 Cricket World Cup.

== Early and personal life ==
Hazlewood was born in Tamworth, and raised 40 km north in the small country town of Bendemeer, both in the New England region of New South Wales. He is the younger son of Trevor and Anne Hazlewood, having an older brother and sister. He would frequently engage with his older brother in fierce backyard cricket matches, and by the age of 12 was already playing for Tamworth against adult men. Growing up, Hazlewood was a supporter of National Rugby League team the Newcastle Knights.

== Domestic career ==
=== Early career ===
Hazlewood was selected for New South Wales at the age of 17, making him the youngest paceman to represent the state. His first-class debut was at the Sydney Cricket Ground against the touring New Zealand team in November 2008. Hazlewood also became the youngest to make his One Day International debut for Australia on 22 June 2010. A right arm fast bowler, he has also played for Australia Under-19s and was the youngest member of Australia's squad for the 2008 Under-19 World Cup.

=== T20 cricket ===
Domestically, Hazlewood has played for Big Bash League (BBL) team the Sydney Sixers.

In February 2020, in the 2020 IPL auction, he was bought by the Chennai Super Kings (CSK) ahead of the 2020 Indian Premier League.

In the 2022 Indian Premier League Mega auction, Josh Hazlewood was bought by the Royal Challengers Bangalore (RCB) for ₹7.75 crores. He played a crucial role in helping RCB secure their first-ever maiden IPL trophy in 2025, ending the franchise's 18-year title drought. In the high-stakes IPL 2025 Final against Punjab Kings, he was tasked with defending 29 runs in the final over of the match. Despite a late boundary onslaught from batsman Shashank Singh, Hazlewood held his nerve to concede just 22 runs out of the 29 available, mathematically sealing a historic 6-run victory for RCB. He finished as the team's top wicket taker in 2025. Also He was part of the 2026 Royal Challengers Bengaluru squad and Played Crucial Role to defend their Title and Win Back to Back Trophies with them.

== International career ==
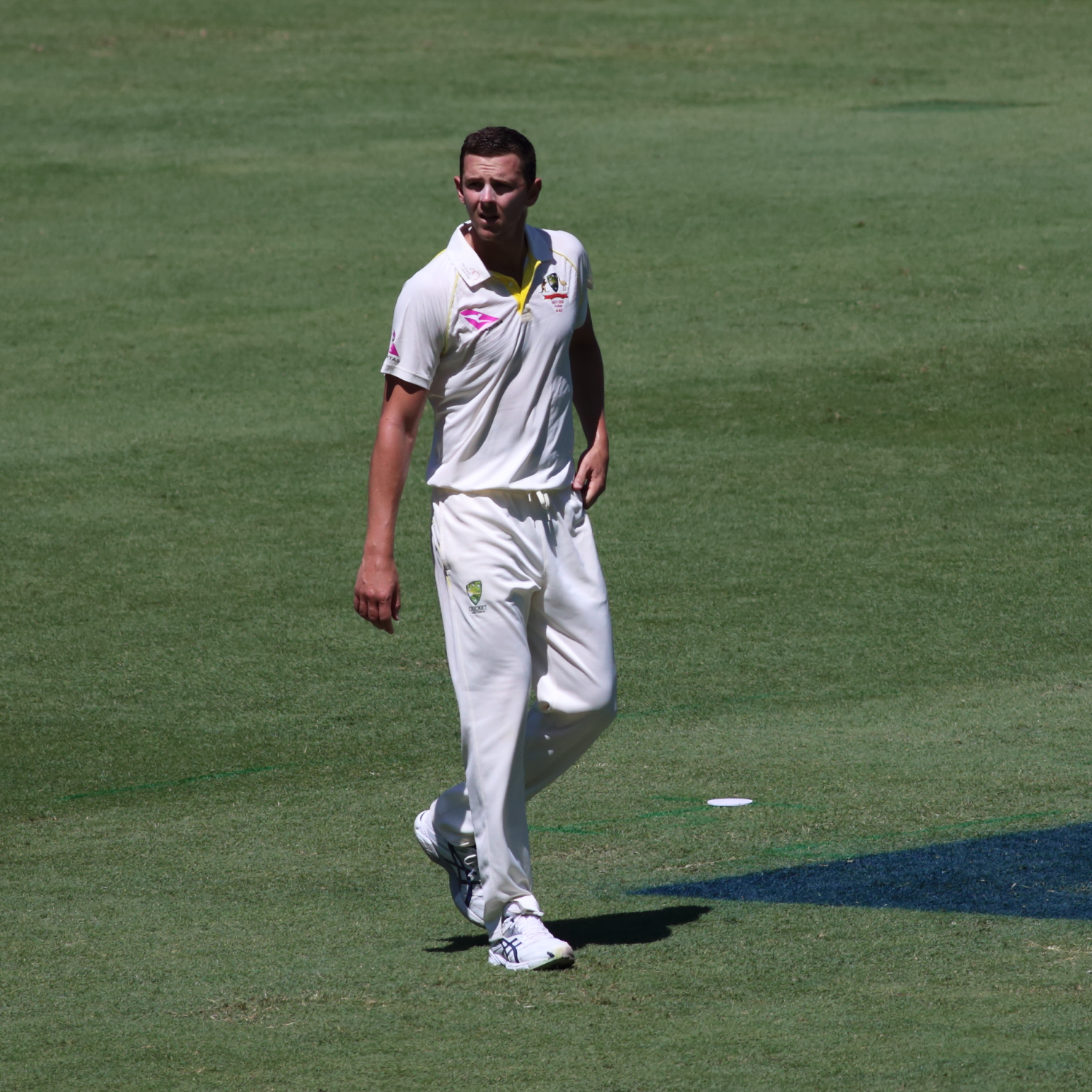
Hazlewood with Australia in 2018

Hazlewood bowling in a match against South Africa in 2026

He bowled 7 overs on his One Day International debut and picked up one wicket for 41 runs. He made his T20I debut vs West Indies on 13 February 2013 and picked up 1–36 in 4 overs. He picked career best figures of 4–30 in a T20 vs England.

He made his Test match debut against India at the Brisbane Cricket Ground, commonly known as The Gabba on 17 December 2014. He took 5 wickets in the first innings, conceding 68 runs. He was a part of the Australian squad for the 2015 ICC Cricket World Cup and played a part in their triumph, picking up 4 wickets against Pakistan in the quarter-finals.

In November 2015, Hazlewood became the first player to achieve the player of the match award in a day-night Test match. In this match against New Zealand, he took the first wicket in day-night Test by having Martin Guptill leg before wicket. He also took the first five-wicket haul in day-night Test cricket history with the figures of 6 for 70, en route to reaching 50 career wickets in just his 12th Test, faster than Shane Warne, Glenn McGrath and Mitchell Johnson.

In January 2017, Hazlewood recorded an unusual innings in the first ODI against New Zealand. He had a 26-minute long 54-run tenth wicket partnership with Marcus Stoinis without facing a single ball. He was run out at the non-striker's end with Australia falling just seven runs short of a win and he became the first player to be dismissed for a diamond duck in a partnership of over fifty runs. This was Hazlewood's first ODI dismissal, setting the record for the most ODI matches played without being dismissed (33), a record he had overtaken in December 2016 after his 28th ODI. Hazlewood picked up nine wickets in the Champions Trophy that year while topping the ICC ODI bowlers' rankings.

In April 2018, he was awarded a national contract by Cricket Australia for the 2018–19 season.

In July 2019, he was named in Australia's squad for the 2019 Ashes series in England. Hazlewood played in 4 of the 5 matches of the series, taking 20 wickets at an average of 21.85.

On 16 July 2020, Hazlewood was named in a 26-man preliminary squad of players to begin training ahead of a possible tour to England following the COVID-19 pandemic. On 14 August 2020, Cricket Australia confirmed that the fixtures would be taking place, with Hazelwood included in the touring party.

Hazlewood took his 200th Test wicket against India in the first Test of Border–Gavaskar Trophy series 2020–21. He is Australia's 8th highest Test wicket taker as of 25 April 2024. In August 2021, Hazlewood was named in Australia's squad for the 2021 ICC Men's T20 World Cup. In 2021 after the T20 World Cup, he became the first bowler to be ranked among the top 10 in all three formats (Test, ODI, T20) in ICC rankings.

Hazlewood was selected in Australia's squad in the 2021–22 Ashes series, where he only played the first test match in Brisbane, taking three wickets and two catches. He was named as stand-in captain for a rested Pat Cummins during the second ODI against England in November 2022.

In May 2024, he was named in Australia's squad for the 2024 ICC Men's T20 World Cup tournament.

He was ruled out of 2026 ICC Men's T20 World Cup due to knee injury as he failed to recover on time.

During the 1st Test match against Bangladesh in August 2026, Hazlewood reached the milestone of 300 career Test wickets, becoming the 9th Australian bowler to reach the landmark.

== Achievements ==
- ICC Men's Emerging Cricketer of the Year: 2015
- ICC Men's Test Team of the Year: 2015
- ICC Men's T20I Team of the Year: 2021
