= Aaron Finch =

Australian cricketer (born 1986)

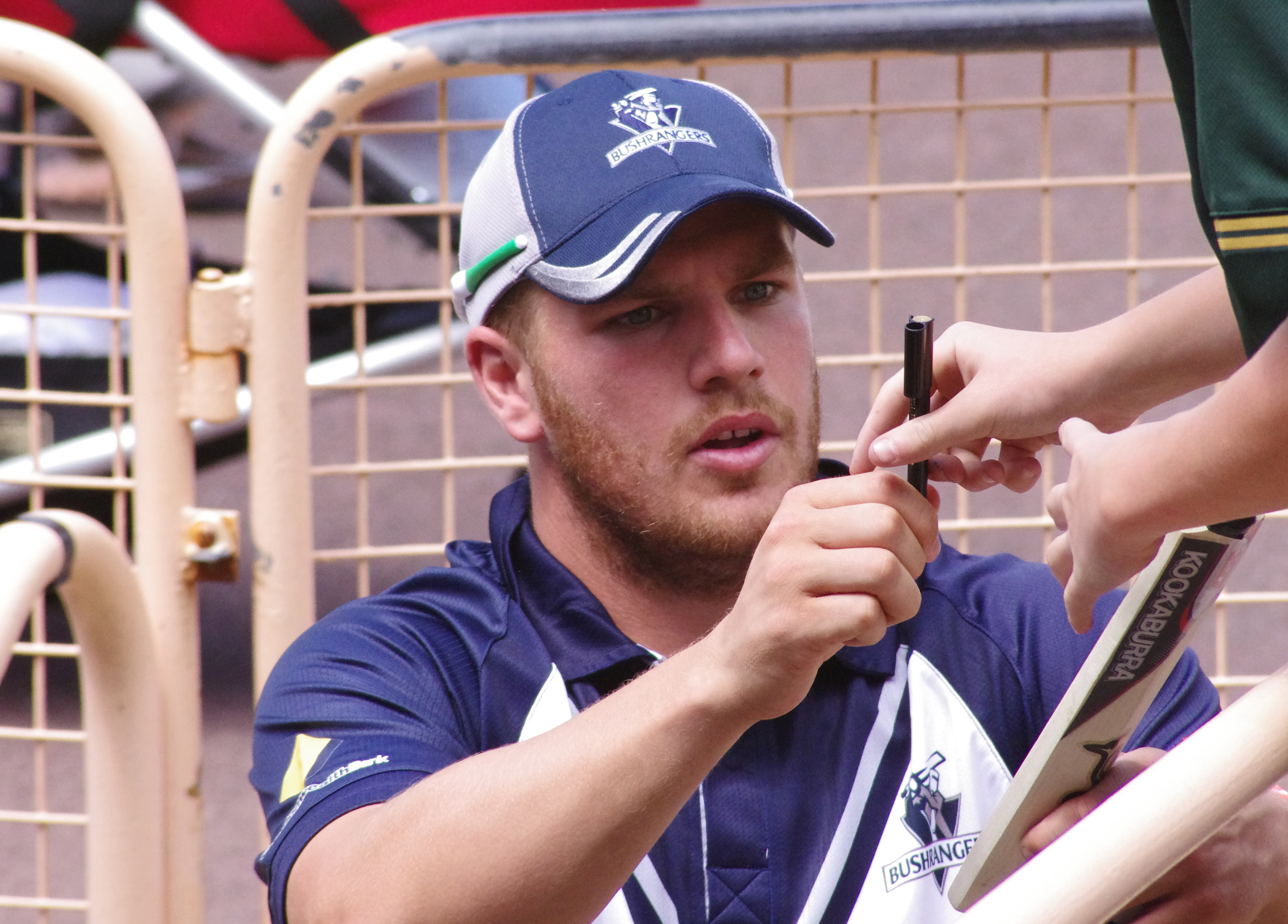
- Finch in 2011

Personal information
- Full name: Aaron James Finch
- Born: 17 November 1986 (age 39); Colac, Victoria, Australia
- Height: 1.74 m (5 ft 9 in)
- Batting: Right-handed
- Bowling: Slow left-arm orthodox
- Role: Top-order batter

International information
- National side: Australia (2011–2022)
- Test debut (cap 453): 7 October 2018 v Pakistan
- Last Test: 26 December 2018 v India
- ODI debut (cap 197): 11 January 2013 v Sri Lanka
- Last ODI: 11 September 2022 v New Zealand
- ODI shirt no.: 5 (formerly 16)
- T20I debut (cap 49): 12 January 2011 v England
- Last T20I: 31 October 2022 v Ireland
- T20I shirt no.: 5 (formerly 16)

Domestic team information
- Years: Team
- 2007/08–2022/23: Victoria
- 2009/10: Rajasthan Royals
- 2011–2012: Delhi Daredevils
- 2011/12–2023/24: Melbourne Renegades
- 2012: Ruhuna Royals
- 2012/13: Auckland
- 2013: Pune Warriors India
- 2014: Sunrisers Hyderabad
- 2014–2015: Yorkshire
- 2015: Mumbai Indians
- 2016–2017: Gujarat Lions
- 2016–2019: Surrey
- 2018: Kings XI Punjab
- 2020: Royal Challengers Bangalore
- 2022: Kolkata Knight Riders
- 2023: San Francisco Unicorns

Career statistics
Competition	Test	ODI	T20I	FC
Matches	5	146	103	88
Runs scored	278	5,406	3,120	4,915
Batting average	27.80	38.89	34.28	35.87
100s/50s	0/2	17/30	2/19	7/33
Top score	62	153*	172	288*
Balls bowled	12	284	12	464
Wickets	0	4	0	5
Bowling average	–	64.75	–	63.60
5 wickets in innings	–	0	–	0
10 wickets in match	–	0	–	0
Best bowling	–	1/2	–	1/0
Catches/stumpings	7/–	71/–	50/–	81/–
Medal record
Men's Cricket
Representing Australia
ICC Cricket World Cup
Winner	2015 Australia and New Zealand
T20 World Cup
Winner	2021 UAE & Oman
- Source: ESPNcricinfo, 7 February 2023

Aaron James Finch (born 17 November 1986) is an Australian cricket commentator and former international cricketer who previously captained the Australia national cricket team in both One Day International (ODI) and Twenty20 International (T20I) cricket. An opening batter and occasional left arm orthodox spinner, he made his international debut in 2011. He also played for Victoria in domestic cricket and the Melbourne Renegades in the Big Bash League.

First handed captaincy for the Australian T20I squad in 2014, Finch was named Australian Men's Twenty20 International Player of the Year that same year. He was also a member of the 2015 Cricket World Cup squad. Though replaced by as captain in 2016, he returned as captain of the T20I teams in 2018 alongside taking over the ODI team following a short stint as captain to replace an injured Matthew Wade. That same year, he broke the record for the highest individual score in T20I, a record he still holds as of 2026. Scoring 172 against Zimbabwe in July 2018, he beat the previous record he set of 156 off 63 balls against England in August 2013.

2018 saw Finch winning the Australian Men's Twenty20 International Player of the Year once again, also being awarded the Australian Men's One Day International Player of the Year in 2020. He led Australia to win their the maiden Men's T20 World Cup title in 2021. He announced his retirement from ODI cricket in 2022 before retiring from all international cricket in 2023.

== Early and personal life ==
Aaron James Finch was born on 17 November 1986 in Colac, Victoria and raised in Irrewarra. He has two older brothers and a younger sister. He originally played at Colac West Cricket Club in the Colac & District Cricket Association (CDCA) as a wicket-keeper.

Finch married Amy Griffith in 2018; the couple have a daughter. He is a supporter of the Australian Football League team Geelong Cats.

== Domestic career ==
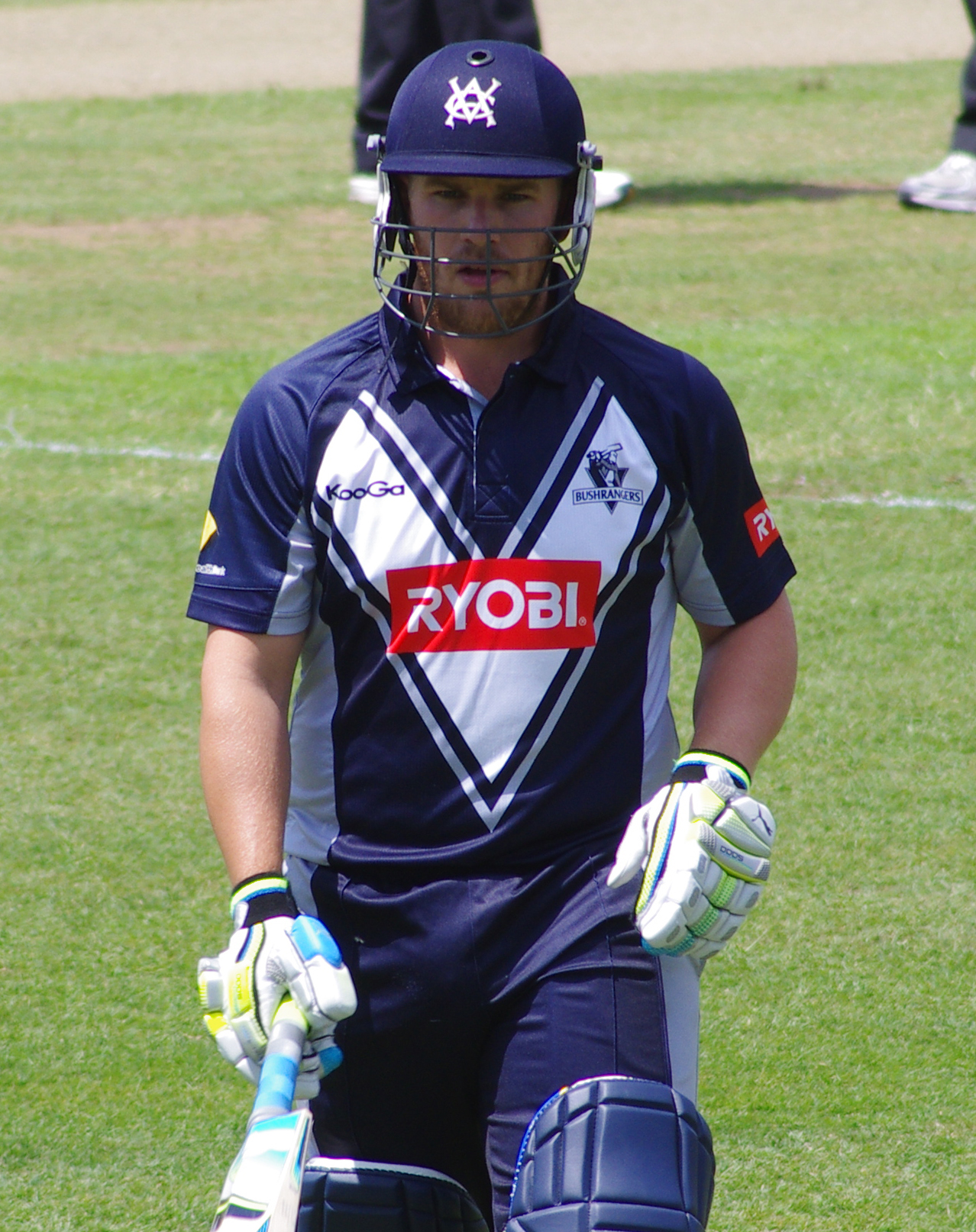
Finch playing for Victoria in 2011.

Finch got his opportunity to become established as a regular in the Victorian team in the 2009/10 season. He hit his maiden first-class cricket century against Tasmania at the Melbourne Cricket Ground (MCG) in a partnership of 212 runs for the third wicket with David Hussey. In October 2012, while filling in as captain, he scored 154 runs at the Gabba against Queensland, a new highest score for Victoria in domestic one day cricket.

After playing for the Melbourne Renegades in the inaugural Big Bash League season in 2011, he captained the team in 2012 and was the Big Bash League player of the year. Finch captained the Melbourne Renegades from 2012 through to 2020, before stepping down citing he wanted to spend more time with his family. He then returned to captaincy for the back half of the 2022/23 season, after an injury to captain Nic Maddinson. In December 2015, Finch became the first player to score 1,000 runs in the Big Bash. Finch became only the second player to score over 3,000 runs in the Big Bash on 1 January 2023.

Finch has played county cricket in England, first for Yorkshire County Cricket Club in 2014 and 2015 before joining Surrey from 2016. In July 2018, during the 2018 T20 Blast, he scored 131 not out for Surrey, setting a new record for the highest T20 individual score for Surrey in a county match and hitting the highest T20 score at the Hove County Ground.

== Franchise career ==
Finch has played for nine teams in the Indian Premier League (IPL), more than any other player. He was first selected by Rajasthan Royals in 2010 before going on to play the next two seasons for Delhi Daredevils. 2013 saw him play for Pune Warriors India, 2014 for Sunrisers Hyderabad and 2015 for Mumbai Indians, although his opportunities for the team were limited due to injury.

In 2016 he was bought by Gujarat Lions, playing for the team for two seasons, before being bought by Kings XI Punjab in the 2018 IPL Auction. He was released by KXIP at the end of the season and opted out of 2019 IPL season in order to prepare for the 2019 Cricket World Cup. He was bought by Royal Challengers Bangalore ahead of the 2020 season. In 2022, Finch was signed by the Kolkata Knight Riders as a replacement for Alex Hales for the 2022 Indian Premier League.

Elsewhere, Finch had played continuously for Melbourne Renegades from the 2011/12 season until retiring after the 2023/24 season. Finch also played for Ruhuna Royals in Sri Lanka's 2012 season.

== International career ==
Finch first played internationally as a member of Australia's 2006 Under-19 Cricket World Cup squad in Sri Lanka. He was vice-captain.

Aaron Finch's record as captain
Format	Matches	Won	Lost	Tied	NR	Win %
T20Is	76	40	32	1	3	55.47
ODIs	55	31	24	0	0	56.36

Finch made his international debut for Australia in a T20I against England in January 2011. Two years later he made his One Day International (ODI) debut against Sri Lanka. In August 2013, Finch set a new record for the highest individual score in a Twenty20 international, scoring 156 runs from 63 balls against England at the Rose Bowl, Southampton. Finch's innings included 14 sixes (also a record) and 11 fours. He was the first player to score 150 runs in a T20I innings. He was awarded the Men's T20I Player of the Year at the Allan Border Medal ceremony by Cricket Australia in 2014.

Finch was selected as part of Australia's 2015 Cricket World Cup squad. In Australia's first group match against England he top scored with 135 runs, helping Australia to a 111 run win. Despite being the top rated T20I batsman, he was dropped for the first two matches of Australia's campaign in the 2016 ICC World T20 before being reinstated for the last two matches of the campaign.

In late 2015 an unusual warmup tour game at Blacktown International Sportspark, in the 2015-16 New Zealand tour of Australia enabled Finch to score his highest first class cricket innings. As part of a team composed of players who had been not selected for their respective state Sheffield Shield matches that week he smashed 288 not out and was part of record breaking 503 opening wicket stand with Ryan Carters, who piled on 209 runs of his own. The pair batted through the entire first day, torturing the New Zealand attack in a match they would have much preferred to be batting in. On the second day the badly deteriorating surface caused the New Zealanders to play spin only due to the threat of potential injury to pace bowlers, and the pair continued through the morning until Carters was dismissed by Tom Latham, wicket-keeper batsman earning the only wicket he took in his career in high level cricket. The locals declared immediately, the New Zealand refused to bat due to the playing surface being worn down to bare dirt and the game was abandoned. The 503 run partnership set a new record as the highest partnership in Australian first-class cricket history and one that still stands as of 2024.

In January 2017, Finch was named as stand-in captain for the first ODI against New Zealand in Australia's tour of New Zealand after Matthew Wade withdrew from the team with an injury. Before the second ODI of that series, Wade was ruled out of series due to a back injury and Finch continued to captain in the remaining matches.

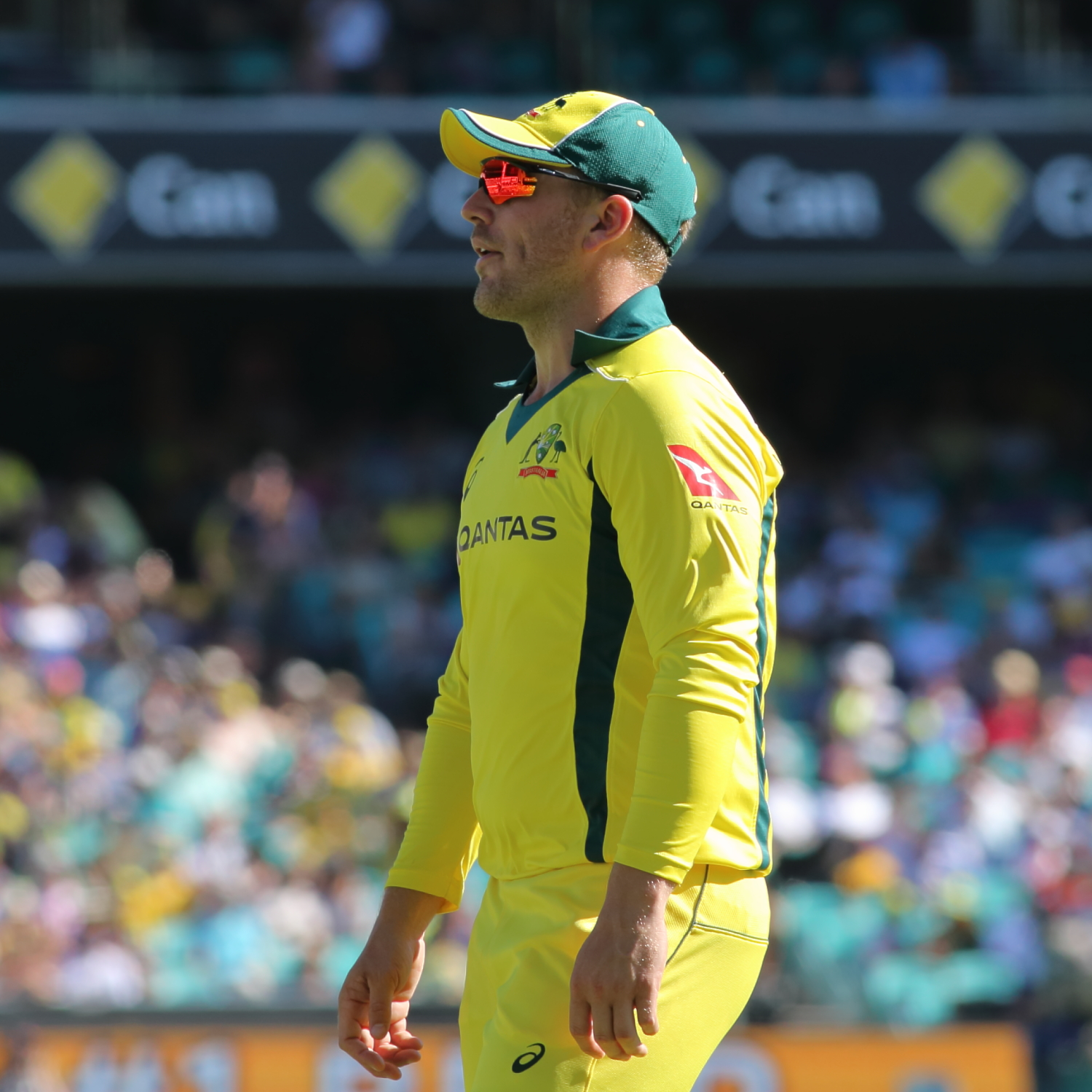
Finch playing in an ODI for Australia, January 2018

In April 2018, he was awarded a national contract by Cricket Australia for the 2018–19 season and in July scored 172 against Zimbabwe, a new record T20I individual score. He hit 10 sixes in the innings during a world record T20I opening stand of 223 runs with D'Arcy Short which ended in the final over of the innings. The partnership was the second highest for any wicket in a T20I.

In September 2018, he was named in Australia's Test match squad for their series against Pakistan in the United Arab Emirates, making his Test debut on 7 October. He had his baggy green cap presented to him by Allan Border before going on to score 62 and 49 runs in his two innings in the match.

In April 2019, Finch was named the captain of Australia's squad for the 2019 Cricket World Cup. On 16 July 2020, Finch was named in a 26-man preliminary squad of players to begin training ahead of a possible tour to England following the COVID-19 pandemic. On 14 August 2020, Cricket Australia confirmed that the fixtures would be taking place, with Finch included in the touring party.

In November 2020, Finch was nominated for the ICC Men's T20I Cricketer of the Decade award.

On 5 March 2021, Finch became the leading run-getter for Australia in T20I format going past David Warner against New Zealand. In August 2021, Finch was named as the captain of Australia's squad for the 2021 ICC Men's T20 World Cup. Finch would then captain Australia to win their maiden T20 World Cup, defeating New Zealand in the final by eight wickets.

On 10 September 2022, Finch announced his retirement from ODI cricket ahead of the third ODI against New Zealand, but still planned to play in T20Is. He continued to captain Australia's Twenty20 team and led it in its failed defence of the T20 World Cup in October and November 2022 in Australia. On 7 February 2023, Finch announced his retirement from international cricket.

=== International centuries ===
During his career Finch has scored 19 centuries in international cricket – 17 in One Day Internationals and two in Twenty20 International

ODI centuries
No.	Score	Opponent	Venue	Date	Ref
1	148	Scotland	Grange Cricket Club, Edinburgh	3 September 2013	
2	121	England	Melbourne Cricket Ground	12 January 2014	
3	108	England	WACA Ground, Perth	24 January 2014	
4	102	South Africa	Harare Sports Club, Harare	27 August 2014	
5	109	South Africa	Manuka Oval, Canberra	19 November 2014	
6	135	England	Melbourne Cricket Ground	14 February 2015	
7	107	India	Manuka Oval, Canberra	20 January 2016	
8	124	India	Holkar Stadium, Indore	24 September 2017	
9	107	England	Melbourne Cricket Ground	14 January 2018	
10	106	England	The Gabba, Brisbane	18 January 2018	
11	100	England	Riverside Ground, Chester-le-Street	21 June 2018	
12	116	Pakistan	Sharjah Cricket Stadium	22 March 2019	
13	153*	Pakistan	Sharjah Cricket Stadium	23 March 2019	
14	153	Sri Lanka	The Oval, London	15 June 2019	
15	100	England	Lord's, London	25 June 2019	
16	110*	India	Wankhede Stadium, Mumbai	14 January 2020	
17	114	India	Sydney Cricket Ground	27 November 2020	

Twenty20 International centuries
No.	Score	Opponents	Venue	Date	Ref
1	156	England	Rose Bowl, Southampton	29 August 2013	
2	172	Zimbabwe	Harare Sports Club	3 July 2018	

== Achievements ==
- Australian ODI Player of the Year: 2020
- Australian T20I Player of the Year: 2014, 2018
- Big Bash League Player of the Series: 2012-13
- Marsh One Day Cup Player of the Tournament: 2012-13

Preceded by Angelo Mathews	Pune Warrior India captains 2013	Succeeded by Last Captain
Preceded by George Bailey	Australian Twenty20 International cricket captain 2012–2016	Succeeded by Steve Smith
