= Marcus Stoinis =

Australian cricketer (born 1989)

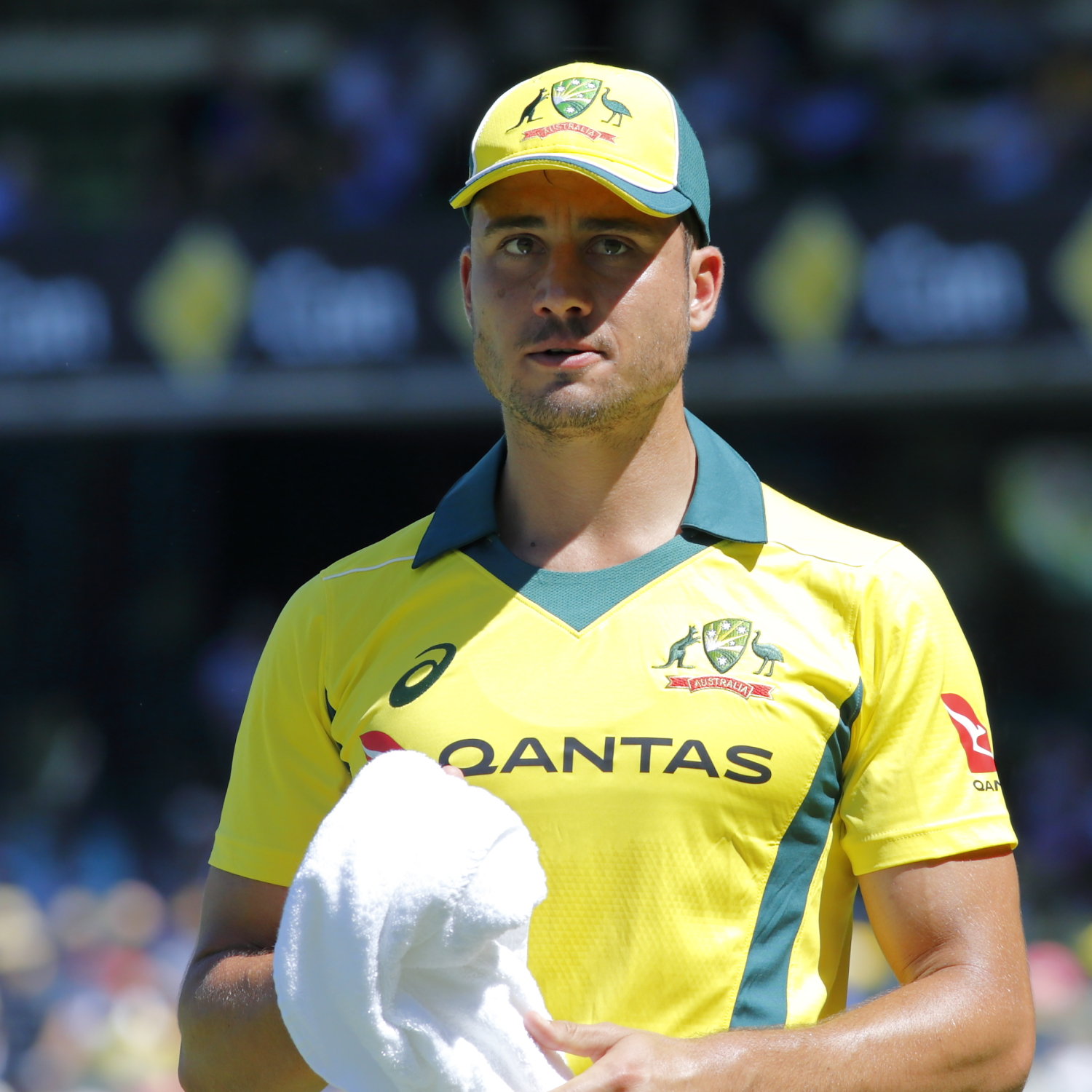
- Stoinis in 2018

Personal information
- Full name: Marcus Peter Stoinis
- Born: 16 August 1989 (age 37); Perth, Western Australia
- Batting: Right-handed
- Bowling: Right-arm medium
- Role: Batting all-rounder

International information
- National side: Australia (2015–present)
- ODI debut (cap 209): 11 September 2015 v England
- Last ODI: 10 November 2024 v Pakistan
- ODI shirt no.: 17
- T20I debut (cap 74): 31 August 2015 v England
- Last T20I: 20 February 2026 v Oman
- T20I shirt no.: 17

Domestic team information
- Years: Team
- 2008/09–2009/10: Western Australia
- 2012/13: Perth Scorchers
- 2012/13–2016/17: Victoria
- 2013/14–present: Melbourne Stars
- 2016–2018, 2025–present: Kings XI Punjab
- 2017/18–2022/23: Western Australia
- 2018: Kent
- 2019: Royal Challengers Bangalore
- 2020–2021: Delhi Capitals
- 2022–2024: Lucknow Super Giants
- 2022, 2026: Southern Brave
- 2022/23: Sharjah Warriors
- 2023: San Francisco Unicorns
- 2023/24–2024/25: Durban's Super Giants
- 2024–2025: Texas Super Kings
- 2025: Trent Rockets

Career statistics
Competition	ODI	T20I	FC	LA
Matches	71	87	63	123
Runs scored	1,495	1,416	3,348	2,920
Batting average	26.69	30.78	33.14	29.49
100s/50s	1/6	0/6	4/25	4/14
Top score	146*	78	170	146*
Balls bowled	2,071	905	5,086	3,423
Wickets	48	53	68	87
Bowling average	43.12	25.22	40.44	37.03
5 wickets in innings	0	0	0	0
10 wickets in match	0	0	0	0
Best bowling	3/16	4/23	4/73	4/43
Catches/stumpings	18/–	24/–	23/–	37/–
Medal record
Men's Cricket
Representing Australia
ICC Cricket World Cup
Winner	2023 India
ICC T20 World Cup
Winner	2021 UAE and Oman
- Source: ESPNcricinfo, 20 February 2026

Marcus Peter Stoinis (born 16 August 1989) is an Australian international cricketer who represents the Australia national cricket team in Twenty20 International cricket. He is a right-handed batting all-rounder who bowls right-arm medium. Domestically, Stoinis captained Melbourne Stars in the 2024–25 Big Bash League and has played Sheffield Shield cricket for Western Australia and Victoria.

Stoinis was a member of the Australian teams that won both the 2021 T20 World Cup and 2023 Cricket World Cup. He has played in a number of Twenty20 leagues around the world.

== Early life ==
Stoinis was born on 16 August 1989 in Perth into a family of Greek descent, and represented Western Australia at both under-17 and under-19 level. Stoinis played for the Australian under-19 cricket team at the 2008 ICC Under-19 World Cup. The following year, he represented Australia at the Hong Kong Sixes.

== Domestic and T20 career ==
After playing several Futures League matches for the state under-23 team, Stoinis made his List A debut for Western Australia in the 2008–09 Ford Ranger Cup. Both his one-day debut and his Sheffield Shield debut (two days later) came against Queensland at the Gabba. Stoinis played one more Sheffield Shield game and two more Ford Ranger Cup matches during the 2008–09 season, and one in each competition during the 2009–10 season, but was not regularly selected.

In Australia, Stoinis has played club cricket for Scarborough in the Western Australian Grade Cricket competition and for Northcote in the Victorian Premier Cricket. He spent part of the 2012 English season playing for the Peterborough Town Cricket Club in the Northampton Premier League, and in one match took a hat-trick. Stoinis also played five Second XI Championship matches for Kent County Cricket Club during his time in England.

In December 2012, Stoinis was selected in the Perth Scorchers' squad for the 2012–13 Big Bash League season, replacing the injured Mitchell Marsh. In the 2013, Stoinis began representing Victoria domestically, before returning to Western Australia for the 2017–18 season.

He was signed by the Delhi Daredevils ahead of the 2015 edition of the Indian Premier League. He was then picked up by the Kings XI Punjab for the 2016 season in the auction for INR 5.5 million. On 13 May 2016 he achieved his career best T20 figures in a game for Kings XI against Mumbai Indians, taking 4/15 from his four overs.

Stoinis was promoted to permanently open the batting for the Melbourne Stars in 2018, and the move paid dividends. Signing a four-year deal at the start of the season, Stoinis was the leading run scorer for the Stars in the 2018–19 Big Bash League, scoring 533 runs at an average of 53.30, while also taking 14 wickets. He was released by the Royal Challengers Bangalore ahead of the 2020 IPL auction. In the 2020 IPL auction, he was bought by the Delhi Capitals ahead of the 2020 Indian Premier League.

In the Melbourne derby on 5 January 2020, Stoinis was fined $7,500 for a homophobic slur directed at Renegades bowler Kane Richardson. He expressed remorse for the incident, saying he got "caught in the moment and took it too far".

On 12 January 2020, Stoinis scored 147 from 79 balls against Sydney Sixers, setting the new highest individual score in the Big Bash League. In July 2020, he was named in the Barbados Tridents squad for the 2020 Caribbean Premier League. In 2021, Marcus Stoinis played for the Delhi Capitals in the Indian Premier League. He scored 71 runs at an average of 23.66 and took 2 wickets, at an average of 54.50 before the IPL was postponed

In April 2022, he was bought by the Southern Brave for the 2022 season of The Hundred in England.

In March 2023, he was signed by the San Francisco Unicorns for the first edition of Major League Cricket in the United States.

In December 2024, he was named as the Melbourne Stars captain for the BBL14 season as the replacement for Glenn Maxwell.

In 2025, he was bought by the Punjab Kings for the 2025 Indian Premier League.

== International career ==
Stoinis made his Twenty20 International debut against England on 31 August 2015. His One Day International debut came against the same team on 11 September 2015. On 30 January 2017, in his second ODI against New Zealand, Stoinis took three wickets and scored 146 not out. This was the highest ODI score from seventh in the batting order by an Australian batsman. Stoinis was awarded man of the match, despite his team losing.

In March 2017, he was added in the Australia Test squad for the third and fourth Tests against India as a replacement for the injured Mitchell Marsh, although he did not play in either match.

In April 2018, he was awarded a national contract by Cricket Australia for the 2018–19 season. In January 2019, he was added to Australia's Test squad for the second Test against Sri Lanka. In April 2019, he was named in Australia's squad for the 2019 Cricket World Cup. In the 2019 World Cup, after playing the first four games, Stoinis picked up a side strain injury.

On 16 July 2020, Stoinis was named in a 26-man preliminary squad of players to begin training ahead of a possible tour to England following the COVID-19 pandemic. On 14 August 2020, Cricket Australia confirmed that the fixtures would be taking place, with Stoinis included in the touring party.

In August 2021, Stoinis was named in Australia's squad for the 2021 ICC Men's T20 World Cup.

In August 2023, Stoinis was named in Australia's squad for the 2023 Cricket World Cup, where he played 6 matches and was part of the squad, where the Australia team won the World Cup.

In May 2024, Stoinis was named in Australia's squad for the 2024 ICC Men's T20 World Cup tournament, where he was instrumental in the tournament, scoring 169 runs at 42.25, and 10 wickets at economy 8.88.

In February 2025, before the Champions Trophy, Stoinis announced his retirement from ODI cricket.
