= Bryan-Brown =

Bryan-Brown is a surname and may be:

- Adrian Bryan-Brown, American theatrical press agent
- Marc Bryan-Brown, American photographer

== See also ==
- Boneau/Bryan-Brown, an American theatrical press agency
- Bryan Brown, Australia actor
- Bryan D. Brown, American general
