= Cawkwell (surname) =

Cawkwell is a surname. Notable people with the surname include:

- George Cawkwell (1919–2019), New Zealand-British ancient historian
- Simon Cawkwell (born 1946), British businessman, stock market commentator, and author

== See also ==
- Cawkwell, a hamlet in Lincolnshire, England
