= Boneau =

Boneau may be:

- Boneau, Montana, USA
- Chris Boneau, an American theatrical press agent

== See also ==
- Boneau/Bryan-Brown, an American theatrical press agency
