= Keith Ingram (disambiguation) =

Keith Ingram (born 1955) is an American politician.

Keith Ingram may also refer to:

- Keith Ingram (headmaster) (1929–2007), British headmaster of the Dragon School, 1965–1989
- Keith Ingram, manager of the band Dru Hill

== See also ==
- Keith Ingham, pianist
