= Gillette Cup =

The Gillette Cup may refer to the following cricket competitions:

- Gillette Cup (England) — an English knock-out one-day competition known as the Gillette Cup from 1963 to 1980, later known as the Friends Provident Cup
- Gillette Cup (South Africa)— a South African knock-out one-day competition which lasted from 1969–70 to 1976–77. It was later known as the Nissan Shield, Datsun Shield and Total Power
- Gillette Cup (Australia) — the name used for the ING Cup between 1972–73 and 1979–80
- Gillette Cup (West Indies) — the name used for the KFC Cup in the 1975–76 and 1976–77 seasons
- Gillette Cup (New Zealand) — a knock-out one-day competition in the 1977–78 and 1978–79 seasons, which was also known as the National Knockout before it was discontinued
- Gillette Cup New Zealand Secondary Schools Cricket — a knock-out one-day competition for schoolboys
