= Mark Craig =

New Zealand cricketer

Personal information
- Full name: Mark Donald Craig
- Born: 23 March 1987 (age 39); Auckland, New Zealand
- Batting: Left-handed
- Bowling: Right-arm off break
- Role: Bowler

International information
- National side: New Zealand (2014–2016)
- Test debut (cap 265): 8 June 2014 v West Indies
- Last Test: 22 September 2016 v India

Domestic team information
- Years: Team
- 2008/09–2018/19: Otago
- 2014: Gloucestershire

Career statistics
Competition	Test	FC	LA	T20
Matches	15	60	25	19
Runs scored	589	1,902	336	41
Batting average	36.81	25.36	21.00	10.25
100s/50s	0/3	1/8	0/0	0/0
Top score	67	104	46	19
Balls bowled	3,669	11,129	1,102	282
Wickets	50	151	21	7
Bowling average	46.52	42.11	44.33	57.85
5 wickets in innings	1	5	0	0
10 wickets in match	1	1	0	0
Best bowling	7/94	7/94	3/6	3/29
Catches/stumpings	14/–	53/–	16/–	11/–
- Source: Cricinfo, 17 June 2023

Mark Donald Craig (born 23 March 1987) is a New Zealand former Test cricketer who played first-class cricket for Otago. A spin bowler, he bowled right-arm off spin, and batted left-handed. He fielded predominantly at second-slip.

== Early life and education ==
Craig was educated at King's College, Auckland.

== Domestic career ==
Craig was born at Auckland in 1987 and played age-group cricket for the provincial side. His early career was affected by chronic fatigue syndrome although he went on to play domestic top-class cricket for Otago between the 2008–09 and 2018–19 seasons and in the Netherlands for Hermes DVS in the Topklasse competition in 2012. In 2014 Craig played in England for Gloucestershire. He was awarded his county cap after appearing in only one match for the side. Craig also spent two seasons in England playing for Coombs Wood Cricket Club in the Worcestershire League in 2005/06.

== International career ==
Craig made his Test cricket debut for New Zealand against the West Indies in June 2014, winning the man of the match award for match bowling figures of 8 for 188. These were the best figures by a New Zealand player on debut until William O'Rourke's 9/93 in February 2024. He was also the first batsman to hit the first ball he faced in Test cricket for six.

Craig showed the ability to bat in tight situations for his team, with his high score of 67 coming in a 4-hour stand with BJ Watling.
