= Plus500 =

Multi-asset online trading company

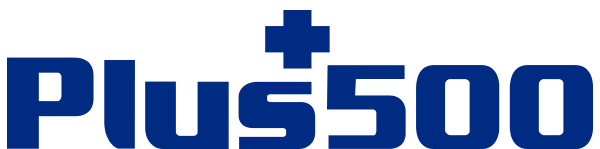

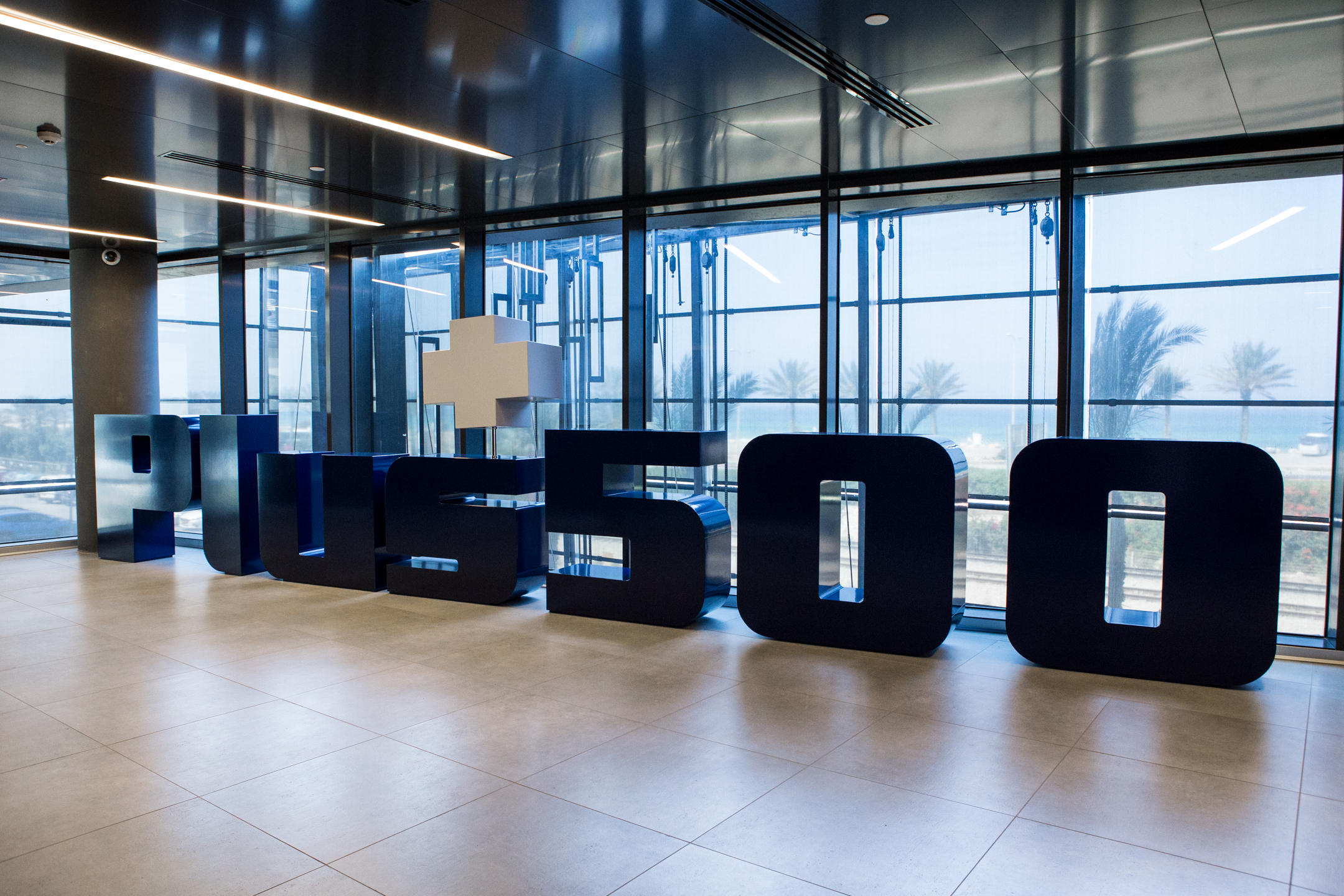
- Plus500 Headquarters in Haifa, Israel
- Type: Public
- Traded as: LSE: PLUS; FTSE 250 component
- Industry: Online trading
- Founded: 2008
- Headquarters: Haifa, Israel
- Key people: Jacob A. Frenkel (Chairman); David Zruia (CEO)
- Services: Online trading platform
- Revenue: ▲US$ 792.4 million (2025)
- Operating income: ▲US$ 342.6 million (2025)
- Net income: ▲US$ 281.3 million (2025)
- Website: plus500.com

Plus500 is a global multi-asset financial technology company headquartered in Haifa, Israel, that provides online trading services in contracts for difference (CFDs), share dealing, futures trading, prediction markets and options on futures. It is listed on the London Stock Exchange and is a constituent of the FTSE 250 Index and the STOXX Europe 600.

== History ==
=== Foundation and early development ===
The company was founded in 2008 by six alumni of the Technion: Alon Gonen, Gal Haber, Elad Ben Yitzhak, Omer Elazari, Shlomi Weizman, and Shimon Sofer, with an initial investment of $400,000.

The platform was originally a software application for Windows, but a web-based version launched in 2010. Mobile versions for iOS and Android launched in 2011 and 2012, respectively. By January 2013, 40% of transactions were conducted via mobile devices.

In 2013, Plus500 became a publicly traded company on the Alternative Investment Market of the London Stock Exchange. Its market capitalisation was $202 million. By mid-2013, Plus500 operated in 51 countries across 30 languages, offering over 1,800 assets. The company launched its Windows Store app in 2014.

=== IPO and regulatory issues ===
In October 2012, Plus500UK Ltd. was fined £205,128 by the UK's Financial Services Authority (FSA), the predecessor of the Financial Conduct Authority (FCA), for inaccurate transaction reporting between June 2010 and November 2011. Of 1,332,000 reportable transactions, none were reported accurately and 189,000 were not reported at all. The regulator found that Plus500UK had failed to ensure adequate systems and controls, documented procedures and staff training for transaction reporting.

In 2014, the Financial Conduct Authority launched a review of Plus500UK's customer-onboarding practices after concerns were raised by competitors. The Times reported that the review examined, among other issues, whether clients were fully verified only when withdrawing funds rather than when opening accounts.

In 2014, co-founder Shimon Sofer sold 1.5 million shares for an estimated £4.1 million, causing an 8.7% drop in the share price.

In May 2015, Plus500UK imposed restrictions on existing customer accounts and stopped onboarding new clients as part of an FCA review of its anti-money-laundering controls. Under a voluntary requirement agreed with the FCA, transactions by existing customers were restricted until additional customer due-diligence documentation had been provided and verified. The restrictions followed concerns over the company's customer-verification procedures. The restrictions roughly halved Plus500's market capitalisation, from £860 million to £459.6 million. During this crisis, Plus500's management agreed to sell the company to Playtech, an online gambling company that was expanding into trading, for $703 million, roughly half its pre-freeze valuation. However, in November 2015, Playtech withdrew after failing to secure regulatory approval. Following the FCA issues, 72% of affected UK clients resumed trading, though Q2 2015 revenue still declined by 47.5% to $43 million. The short seller Simon Cawkwell publicly criticised the company during this period.

=== 2016–present ===
In January 2016, Plus500UK resumed onboarding new customers in the UK. In September 2016, Plus500IL Ltd., the company's Israeli subsidiary, received a Trading Arena Licence from the Israel Securities Authority (ISA).

In autumn 2016, Plus500's founders sold 13% of the company's shares, raising £100.75 million but causing a 16% drop in the share price. They retained a 22% stake.

In December 2017, Plus500's Singapore subsidiary, Plus500SG Pte Ltd., obtained a Capital Markets Services licence from the Monetary Authority of Singapore (MAS) to trade in securities and leveraged forex.

In June 2018, Plus500 launched an Economic Calendar, providing global financial events and indicators in partnership with Dow Jones & Company, along with a list of impacted instruments per event. That same month, Plus500 moved from AIM to the Main Market of the London Stock Exchange. It joined the FTSE 250 Index in September. By 2018, Plus500's trading apps supported 32 languages, including English, German, Italian, Spanish, French, Arabic, and Chinese. For 2018, Plus500 reported revenue of $720.4 million, up 65% from $437.2 million in 2017, while net profit rose 90% to $379.0 million.

In 2021, Plus500 appointed Jacob A. Frenkel, former chairman of JP MorganChase International and former governor of the Bank of Israel, as chairman. The company announced its agreement to acquire Cunningham Commodities LLC and Cunningham Trading Systems LLC, finalising the acquisition by July as part of its expansion into the U.S. futures market.

During the summer of 2021, Plus500 opened a new R&D centre in Tel Aviv and introduced "Plus500 Invest", a stock-trading platform featuring over 2,000 instruments.

In March 2022, Plus500 acquired Japan-based EZ Invest Securities, specialising in securities and derivatives trading. Later, in September, it launched TradeSniper, a futures trading app for U.S. retail clients.

In August 2024, Plus500 announced plans to return $185.5 million to shareholders through a $110 million share buyback and $75.5 million in dividends. The company had benefited from periods of heightened market volatility associated with events including the COVID-19 pandemic, the Russian invasion of Ukraine, and the Gaza war, and was positioning for potential volatility around the 2024 U.S. presidential election. Plus500 also said it would focus on expansion in the U.S., UAE, and Japanese markets. In March 2025, Plus500 agreed to acquire the entire share capital of Mehta Equities Limited, an Indian financial services company regulated by the Securities and Exchange Board of India (SEBI), for approximately $20 million.

In February 2026, Plus500 reported revenue of $792.4 million for 2025, compared with $768.3 million in 2024, while operating profit rose to $342.6 million from $336.1 million and net profit rose to $281.3 million from $273.1 million. The company also announced $187.5 million in shareholder returns, comprising $87.5 million in dividends and a $100 million share buyback, and said its non-OTC business had generated more than $100 million in revenue for the first time. In the same month, Plus500 completed its acquisition of Mehta Equities and expanded its U.S. retail offering into event-based prediction markets through a partnership with Kalshi. In February, chief executive David Zruia, chief financial officer Elad Even-Chen and chief marketing officer Nir Zats sold shares worth about £67 million to Goldman Sachs. It was their first share sale since the company's 2013 flotation, and the shares had fallen by 15% by early March.

In June 2026, Plus500 expanded its U.S. prediction-market offering by launching sports event-based contracts, including contracts linked to the NFL, NBA and MLB, through its futures platform using event contracts listed on Kalshi. In July, it entered a partnership with Canadian investment platform Wealthsimple to provide clearing, order-routing and risk-management infrastructure for access to U.S. futures. In August, Plus500 launched single-stock futures in the U.S., giving customers access to CME Group-listed futures tied to individual U.S. equities.

In August 2026, Plus500 reported first-half revenue of $462.9 million, up 12% year-on-year, and announced $182.5 million in shareholder returns.

== Business model ==
In August 2024, The Times reported that around 80% of retail CFD accounts with Plus500 lost money.

While comparable companies such as IG Group and CMC Markets hedge much of their exposure to client positions, Plus500 only partially hedges its exposure. As a result, client trading performance can directly affect Plus500's revenue: losses by clients may increase the company's revenue, while client gains may reduce it.

Alongside its OTC CFD business, Plus500 also operates share dealing and futures and options on futures platforms.

By 2026, Plus500 held 17 regulatory licences internationally, following licences obtained in Canada, the UAE and Colombia in 2025 and the acquisition of Mehta Equities in India.

== Controversies and legal issues ==
=== Platform failures and financial discrepancies ===
Plus500 has faced numerous complaints over platform failures and questionable practices, with reports of clients wrongly accused of market abuse and profitable trades cancelled.

In February 2019, The Times highlighted discrepancies in Plus500's financial reporting. While the company's 2017 Annual Report stated it had no net revenues or losses from market profit and loss in 2015–2017, a later report revealed a $103 million loss from client trading activity in 2017.

=== Lawsuits and fines ===
In October 2017, several hundred former clients filed a lawsuit against Plus500, accusing the broker of failing to manage their money adequately. In addition, the platform suffered failures that left clients unable to close positions when they wanted to.

In April 2017, Plus500 paid a €550,000 fine to Belgium's FSMA for offering CFDs without the required prospectus and failing to submit ads to the regulator. Although Plus500 denied any wrongdoing, it complied with FSMA's demand to close its Belgian website and inform Belgian clients of the issue, offering free account closures.

In 2021, the Tel Aviv District Court approved a $29 million class action against Plus500 Israel. It was alleged that during the Brexit referendum's volatile aftermath, Plus500 restricted trading in put options for 90 minutes, selectively allowing call options, to prevent customer profits.

In September 2023, a class action was filed in Australia against Plus500AU and Plus500 Limited on behalf of customers who traded CFDs during a period beginning in September 2017 and ending in March 2021 and lost money. The proceeding alleges negligence and misleading, deceptive and unconscionable conduct in the marketing and sale of CFDs. In December 2025, the Federal Court of Australia refused Plus500AU's application to stay the representative proceeding in favour of arbitration, holding that an arbitration clause in its standard customer terms was an unfair contract term and void under the Australian Securities and Investments Commission Act 2001 (Cth).

== Marketing and sponsorships ==
Plus500 has used affiliate marketing to acquire clients through websites and social media platforms such as Facebook and Instagram. The organisation's aggressive affiliate marketing programme has attracted scrutiny from the financial industry. The programme allowed website owners to earn commissions for new client referrals.

In 2015, Plus500 became the Atlético de Madrid's main sponsor and kept that title for the next seven years until June 2022. The company expanded its sports sponsorships in 2016 with the ACT Brumbies of Super Rugby, and, in 2020, signed with three football clubs, including Swiss Super League champions Young Boys and Poland's champions Legia Warsaw. In 2023, beIN Sports blacked out Serie A club Atalanta and Young Boys broadcasts due to restrictions on CFD advertising by the Autorité des marchés financiers (AMF).

In 2022, Plus500 entered a multi-year partnership with the NBA's Chicago Bulls and launched an advertising campaign featuring actor Kiefer Sutherland in the United Kingdom, Italy, the Netherlands, Germany, and Australia.

== See also ==
- List of electronic trading platforms
