= Susan Bloch (disambiguation) =

Susan Bloch could refer to:

- Susan Bloch (1940–1982), American theatrical press agent
- Susan Low Bloch, American professor of Constitutional law and communications law

== See also ==
- Susan Block (born 1955), American sex therapist
- Suzanne Bloch (1907–2002), Swiss-American musician, daughter of Ernst Bloch
- Portrait of Suzanne Bloch, operatic singer painted by Picasso in 1904
