= Joan Marcus =

American theatrical photographer

- Born: Pittsburgh, Pennsylvania, United States
- Education: George Washington University
- Occupation: Photographer
- Known for: Theatrical photography
- Spouse: Adrian Bryan-Brown
- Awards: Tony Honor for Excellence in the Theatre (2014)
- Website: joanmarcusphotography.com

Joan Marcus is a theatrical photographer based in Manhattan, New York City, United States.

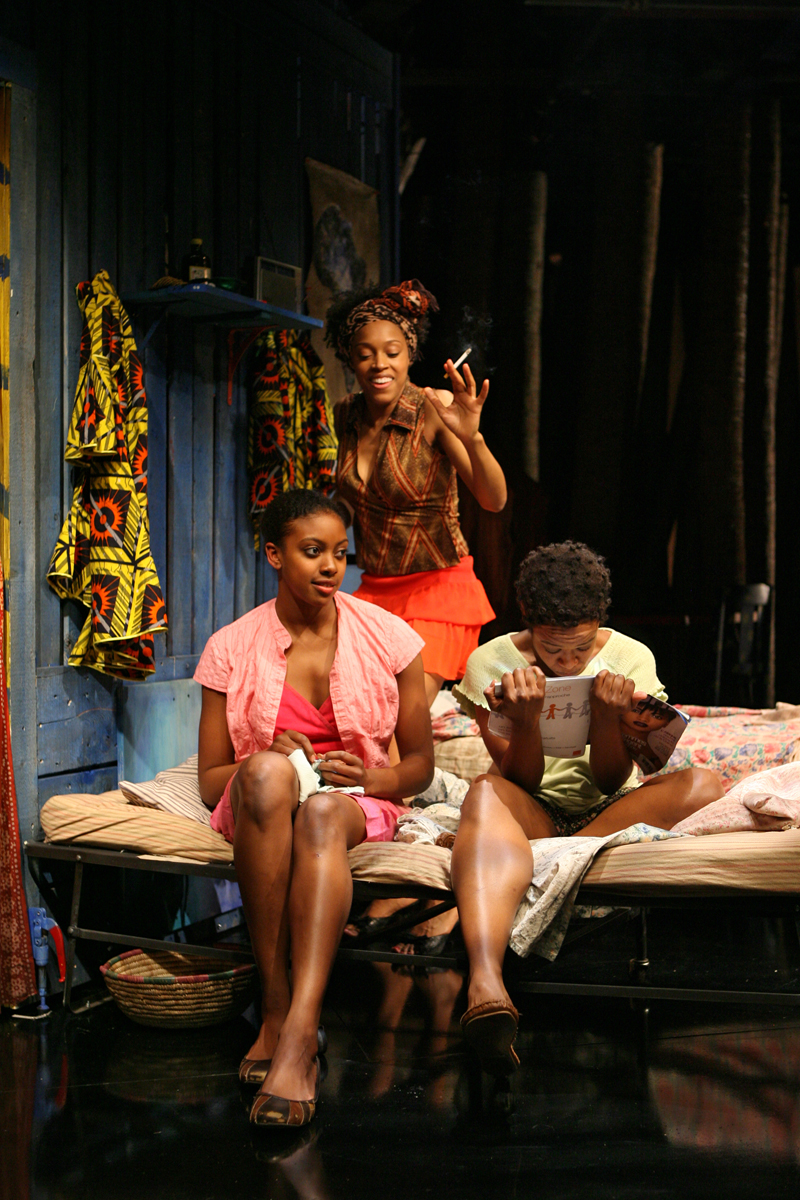
Photograph by Joan Marcus on the opening night of the play Ruined in 2009.

Marcus, born in Pittsburgh, was educated at George Washington University in Washington, D.C. She has been active as a theatrical photographer in Washington, D.C., and New York City for most of her career. Starting in 1986, she has been a photographer on Broadway theatre productions, covering over a hundred shows including Wicked, The Lion King, SisterAct, and The Book of Mormon. She is considered to be "one of the preeminent Broadway photographers."

Joan Marcus is married to the theatrical press agent Adrian Bryan-Brown of Boneau/Bryan-Brown, a leading theatrical New York City press agency. They are both involved with Broadway theatre and have been included in "The 10 Greatest Broadway Couples of All Time".

In 2014, Joan Marcus was awarded a Tony Honor for Excellence in the Theatre at the New York Broadway Tony Awards.

A collection of her photographs is held in the archives of the Billy Rose Theatre Division, New York Public Library for the Performing Arts.

== See also ==
- List of photographers
