= New Zealand cricket team in the West Indies in 2014 =

International cricket tour

	West Indies	New Zealand
- Dates: 8 June 2014 – 6 July 2014
Captains	Denesh Ramdin (Tests); Daren Sammy(T20Is)	Brendon McCullum (Tests) (T20Is)

Test series
- Result: New Zealand won the 3-match series 2–1
Most runs	Kraigg Brathwaite (217)	Kane Williamson (413)
Most wickets	Kemar Roach (15)	Mark Craig (12)
- Player of the series: Kane Williamson (NZ)

Twenty20 International series
- Results: 2-match series drawn 1–1
Most runs	Andre Fletcher (114)	Brendon McCullum (61)
Most wickets	Sheldon Cottrell (3); Daren Sammy (3)	Trent Boult (4)
- Player of the series: Andre Fletcher (WI)

The New Zealand national cricket team toured the West Indies from 8 June to 6 July 2014, playing a three-match Test cricket series and two T20I matches against the West Indies team.

West Indies batsman Chris Gayle played in his 100th Test match in the 1st Test. In that match, Gayle became the seventh West Indian cricketer to pass 7,000 runs in Test cricket. New Zealand's 2–1 Test victory was their first away series win against a top-eight nation in 12 years.

== Squads ==
Tests		T20I	
West Indies	New Zealand	West Indies	New Zealand
Denesh Ramdin (C) (wk); Sulieman Benn; Jermaine Blackwood; Kraigg Brathwaite; Darren Bravo; Shivnarine Chanderpaul; Kirk Edwards; Shannon Gabriel; Chris Gayle; Jason Holder; Kieran Powell; Kemar Roach; Marlon Samuels; Shane Shillingford; Jerome Taylor	Brendon McCullum (C) (wk); Kane Williamson; Corey Anderson; Trent Boult; Mark Craig; Peter Fulton; Tom Latham (wk); James Neesham; Luke Ronchi (wk); Hamish Rutherford; Ish Sodhi; Tim Southee; Ross Taylor; Neil Wagner; BJ Watling (wk)	Daren Sammy (C); Samuel Badree; Christopher Barnwell; Darren Bravo; Sheldon Cottrell; Andre Fletcher (wk); Sunil Narine; Kieron Pollard; Denesh Ramdin (wk); Andre Russell; Krishmar Santokie; Lendl Simmons; Dwayne Smith	Brendon McCullum (C) (wk); Kane Williamson; Corey Anderson; Trent Boult; Mark Craig; Peter Fulton; Tom Latham (wk); James Neesham; Luke Ronchi (wk); Hamish Rutherford; Ish Sodhi; Tim Southee; Ross Taylor; Neil Wagner; BJ Watling (wk)

== Tour matches ==
=== Two-day match: Jamaica Select XI v New Zealanders ===
29 – 30 May 2014
Scorecard

New Zealanders	v	Jamaica Select XI
112/6d (53 overs); Tom Latham 33 (69); Gavon Brown 2/15 (11 overs)		170/9d (49.2 overs); Kennar Lewis 40 (88); Neil Wagner 5/38 (10.2 overs)
210/6 (66 overs); BJ Watling 50 (92); Odean Brown 3/56 (16 overs)

Match drawn
Trelawny Stadium, Jamaica
Umpires: Verdayne Smith and Christopher Taylor

- New Zealanders won the toss and elected to bat

=== Three-day match: Jamaica Select XI v New Zealanders ===
2 – 4 June 2014
Scorecard

Jamaica Select XI	v	New Zealanders
122/9d (45.5 overs); Kennar Lewis 30 (51); Ish Sodhi 5/35 (11.5 overs)		203/9d (64 overs); Kane Williamson 47 (77); Damion Jacobs 4/69 (22 overs)
90 (32.5 overs); Paul Palmer 52 (67); Mark Craig 4/8 (4 overs)		132/9d (40.3 overs); Ross Taylor 55* (62); Derval Green 5/41 (9 overs)

New Zealanders won by 123 runs
Trelawny Stadium, Jamaica
Umpires: Verdayne Smith and Christopher Taylor

- New Zealanders won the toss and elected to bat.

== Test series ==
=== 1st Test ===
8–12 June 2014
Scorecard

New Zealand	v	West Indies
508/7d (174.3 overs); Kane Williamson 113 (298); Sulieman Benn 3/142 (52 overs)		262 (81.2 overs); Shivnarine Chanderpaul 84* (138); Tim Southee 4/19 (16.2 overs)
156/8d (60.5 overs); Tom Latham 73 (181); Jerome Taylor 3/28 (12 overs)		216 (47.4 overs); Shane Shillingford 53* (29); Mark Craig 4/97 (15 overs)

New Zealand won by 186 runs
Sabina Park, Kingston, Jamaica
Umpires: Richard Illingworth (Eng) and Rod Tucker (Aus)
Player of the match: Mark Craig (NZ)

- New Zealand won the toss and elected to bat
- Mark Craig (NZ) made his Test match debut.
- Chris Gayle (WI) played in his 100th Test.
- Mark Craig (NZ) returned the best match figures (8/188) by a New Zealand bowler on debut.

=== 2nd Test ===
16–20 June 2014
Scorecard

New Zealand	v	West Indies
221 (74.4 overs); Tom Latham 82 (163); Jerome Taylor 4/34 (17 overs)		460 (137.1 overs); Kraigg Brathwaite 129 (158); Ish Sodhi 4/96 (19.1 overs)
331 (152.2 overs); Mark Craig 67 (167); Kemar Roach 4/74 (28 overs)		95/0 (13.2 overs); Chris Gayle 80* (46)

West Indies won by 10 wickets
Queen's Park Oval, Port of Spain, Trinidad
Umpires: Ian Gould (Eng), Richard Illingworth (Eng) and Rod Tucker (Aus)
Player of the match: Kraigg Brathwaite (WI)

- New Zealand won the toss and elected to bat.
- Rain intervened after NZ's 2nd innings on Day 5
- Jermaine Blackwood (WI) made his Test match debut.
- Kraigg Brathwaite scored his maiden test century
- Darren Bravo scored his 1st test century at his home ground

=== 3rd Test ===
26–30 June 2014
Scorecard

New Zealand	v	West Indies
293 (78.2 overs); James Neesham 78 (91); Sulieman Benn 5/93 (26.2 overs)		317 (42.2 overs); Kraigg Brathwaite 68 (116); Neil Wagner 4/64 (27 overs)
331/7d (89.1 overs); Kane Williamson 161* (271); Kemar Roach 4/55 (19.1 overs)		254 (82.1 overs); Jason Holder 52 (79); Tim Southee 3/28 (16 overs)

New Zealand won by 53 runs
Kensington Oval, Bridgetown, Barbados
Umpires: Ian Gould (Eng) and Richard Illingworth (Eng)
Player of the match: Kane Williamson (NZ)

- New Zealand won the toss and elected to bat
- Rain curtailed day two after lunch and day four after tea
- Jason Holder (WI) made his Test debut

== T20I series ==
=== 1st T20I ===
5 July 2014
14:00 local
Scorecard

West Indies; 132/8 (20 overs)	v	New Zealand; 117/4 (15 overs)
Andre Fletcher 52 (39); Tim Southee 2/20 (4 overs)		Brendon McCullum 40 (35); Daren Sammy 3/22 (3 overs)

New Zealand won by 12 runs (D/L method)
Windsor Park, Roseau, Dominica
Umpires: Peter Nero (WI) and Joel Wilson (WI)
Player of the match: Andre Fletcher (WI)

- New Zealand won the toss and elected to field
- Ish Sodhi (NZ) made his T20I debut

=== 2nd T20I ===
6 July 2014
14:00 local
Scorecard

West Indies; 165/5 (20 overs)	v	New Zealand; 126 (19.1 overs)
Andre Fletcher 62 (49); Trent Boult 2/22 (4 overs)		Kane Williamson 37 (28); Sheldon Cottrell 3/28 (3.1 overs)

West Indies won by 39 runs
Windsor Park, Roseau, Dominica
Umpires: Gregory Brathwaite (WI) and Joel Wilson (WI)
Player of the match: Andre Fletcher (WI)

- New Zealand won the toss and elected to field
