= King's College, Auckland =

King's College
- Kīngi Kāreti (Māori)

Location
- Golf Avenue; Ōtāhuhu; Auckland 1062; New Zealand; 36.9584°S 174.838160°E

Information
- Other name: King's
- Type: Independent, Day & Boarding
- Motto: Latin: Virtus Pollet (Good Character Prevails)
- Religious affiliation: Anglican
- Established: 1896; 130 years ago
- Ministry of Education Institution no.: 89
- Headmaster: Patrick Gale
- Years: 9–13
- Gender: Junior (Years 9–10): Boys; Senior (Years 11–13): Co-ed
- Enrolment: 1,233 (July 2026)
- Colour: Maroon
- Affiliations: G20 Schools; Round Square; Headmasters' and Headmistresses' Conference
- Alumni name: Old Collegians
- School Song: Carmen Regale
- Website: www.kingscollege.school.nz

King's College (Latin: Collegium Regis; Māori: Kīngi Kāreti), known informally as King's, is an independent Anglican secondary boarding and day school in New Zealand. It educates over 1,000 pupils aged 13 to 18 years. King's was originally founded as a single-sex boys' school, but has admitted girls in the Sixth and Seventh forms (Years 12 and 13) since 1980, and in the Fifth form (Year 11) since 2015.

The college was founded on 11 February 1896 by Graham Bruce. Originally situated in the suburb of Remuera, Auckland at a residence known as "The Towers", the school outgrew its grounds and relocated in 1922 to its present site at Middlemore in the South Auckland suburb of Ōtāhuhu. The primary school department remained at the Remuera site, evolving into King's School, Remuera.

== History and Lineage ==
=== Pre-History and Amalgamation (1842–1913) ===
The deep roots of King's College are linked to early Anglican education in New Zealand through a complex series of school foundations and mergers:

- 1842: Bishop George Selwyn establishes St John's College at Waimate North.
- 1845: St John's College moves to West Tamaki with 27–30 pupils under the framework of the Anglican Theological College.
- 1855: The Church of England Grammar School is founded in Parnell by the Rev. John Kinder, starting with 80 boys.
- 1882–1883: St John's Collegiate School is opened in West Tamaki with 12 boarders and 42 day boys. By 1883, it becomes a private venture managed by Mr. King with a roll of 80 boys.
- 1891–1893: Reverend Percy Scott Smallfield becomes Headmaster and proprietor of St John's Collegiate School in 1891. Concurrently, the Church of England Grammar School in Parnell closes down in 1893, and its remaining sale proceeds are transferred into the St John's College Trust.
- 1896: Graham Bruce opens King's College as a separate entity on 11 February 1896 at "The Towers" in Remuera with 78 boys (including 23 boarders) and 5 staff.
- 1901–1902: Graham Bruce dies at the age of 38, causing the King's College roll to decline significantly. Meanwhile, the St John's College land lease expires, forcing Rev. Smallfield to move his school to a 50-acre property in Onehunga known as "The Pah" (Pah Road), renaming it St John's Collegiate School.
- 1913: King's College and St John's Collegiate School officially amalgamate on the Remuera site, merging their student bodies and traditions. St John's House at King's College preserves this heritage link.

=== The Middlemore Migration and Growth (1914–1947) ===
In 1914, King's College was structured into a public company formed by Auckland citizens, establishing its permanent Board of Governors with Major Charles Thomas Major appointed as Headmaster.

By the end of World War I, severe overcrowding at the Remuera campus prompted action. In 1917, the Board purchased 43 acres of farmland next to the Southern railway line from the Auckland Golf Club. In 1922, the senior school officially moved to this Middlemore site in Ōtāhuhu, while the preparatory school section remained at Remuera to become King's School.

The school roll reached 246 boys by 1927, but the onset of the Great Depression forced structural tightening, dropping the roll back to 161 boys by 1936. The campus rebounded under J.N. Peart, who oversaw the building of the school swimming pool before volunteering for active service in World War II. During the war, the roll climbed sharply to 449 under H.B. Lusk due to heavy wartime demand for quality schooling. A total of 102 Old Collegians lost their lives in World War II, sparking the post-war campaign to build a dedicated Memorial Library.

=== Post-War Era to Present (1947–present) ===
The post-war era saw massive infrastructural expansion under G.N.T. Greenbank, who served for a record 26 years. The physical layout of the campus was modernised through the building of five new facilities, including a dedicated science block, physics wing, and new boarding houses.

Co-education was introduced in 1980 under Headmaster I.P. Campbell, starting with an initial intake of 15 senior girls. This required the opening of Middlemore House as a dedicated girls' boarding facility in 1984. Under J. Taylor, the roll grew dynamically to 861 by 2001, supported by a centennial construction drive that added the iconic 300-seat Lecture Theatre. Continued sports and technological developments defined the headmasterships of R. Kelley and B. Fenner into the 21st century.

== Academic Curriculum and Pathways ==
King's College operates a dual-track academic qualification system for senior students. In Year 11, students complete either foundational NCEA Level 1 courses or the International General Certificate of Secondary Education (IGCSE) through Cambridge International Education (CIE). In Years 12 and 13, students choose between the localized National Certificate of Educational Achievement (NCEA) pathway (Levels 2 and 3) or the international Cambridge International pathway (AS and A Levels).

Academic departments cross-track across both pathways, offering specialized curriculum options:

- The Arts & Humanities: Courses include Visual Arts (Design, Painting, Photography, Sculpture), Art History, Classical Studies, History, Media Studies, Drama, and Dance.
- Languages: Instruction is provided in English Literature, French, Spanish, Latin, and Te Reo Māori.
- Sciences: Senior pathways offer specialization in Biology, Chemistry, Physics, and Marine Science, alongside Psychology.
- Commerce & Technology: Courses comprise Accounting, Business Studies, Economics, Computer Science, Coding, and Financial Education.
- Mathematics: The school offers specialized secondary tracking through localized streams, Statistics, and Accelerated Mathematics (Calculus).

== Co-Curricular Programmes ==
=== Outdoor Education and Adventure Challenge ===
A mandatory component of the junior school curriculum is the Adventure Challenge, structured to develop personal resilience, self-reliance, and team problem-solving skills. The outdoor education infrastructure spans three cornerstone expeditions:

- Puhoi Adventure Camp: A 7-night wilderness initiative program emphasizing bushcraft, navigation, ropes courses, and river walking.
- Steinlager II Expedition: A 3-night blue-water sailing program conducted aboard Steinlager II, Sir Peter Blake's historic 85-foot maxi yacht, focusing on maritime teamwork and coastal navigation.
- Tongariro National Park Expedition: An intensive 8-night alpine and sub-alpine training camp inside the volcanic Plateau, introducing students to snow skills, caving, advanced tramping, and wilderness survival.

=== Sports and Facilities ===
King's College competes heavily in the 1A Rugby Competition and has secured the title 16 times, most recently in 2019. The annual King's College v Auckland Grammar School rugby fixture remains one of the oldest and most fiercely contested rivalries in New Zealand schoolboy sports. Major sporting facilities on campus include the Campbell Sports Complex, an all-weather Olympic-grade hockey turf, an integrated athletics track, and the primary cricket oval. The school cricket program famously secured the national Gillette Cup in consecutive years between 2009 and 2011, producing notable international cricketers including former Black Caps captain Tim Southee.

== Campus Architecture and Features ==
The Middlemore campus is arranged around several historical quadrangles and architectural focal points:

- The Archdall Quad: Named in honor of Canon H.K. Archdall, forming an intellectual and historical hub of the senior campus.
- The Main Quad & Administration Block: Features the historic brick administrative wings and the prominent South Wing.
- The Kelley Design and Technology Centre: Opened in 2012 to house modern engineering, design, and digital systems.
- The Centennial Centre: Built in 2001 to mark 100 years since the school's founding era.
- The Cricket Pavilion: A historic sports heritage structure completed in 1958 overlooking the primary oval.

=== The Memorial Chapel ===
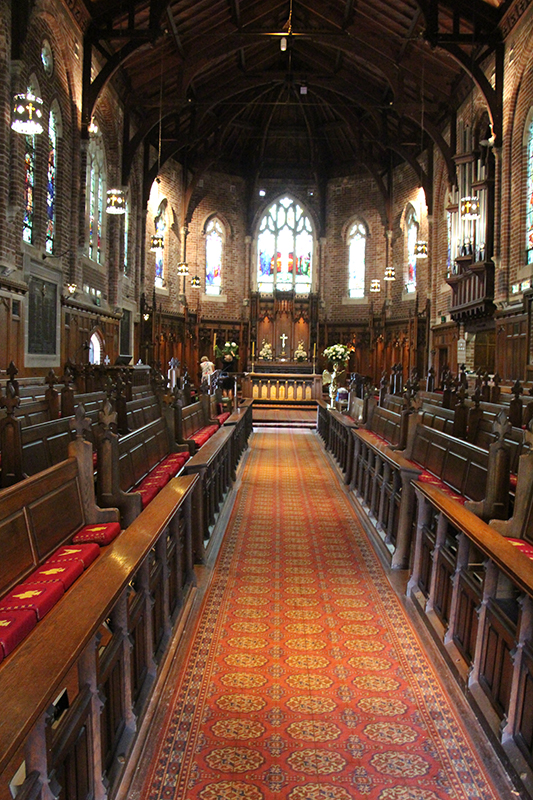
The interior of the King's College Chapel showing the wood-panelled choir stall alignments.

The Memorial Chapel serves as the spiritual centerpiece of the college. Designed by architect Richard Abbott, it was built to honor the Old Collegians and masters who died in World War I. The foundation stone was laid in 1922, and the structure was consecrated on Anzac Day (25 April) 1925 by Archbishop Averill.

Internal Features and Artifacts The chapel contains unique historical artifacts and structural elements detailed in the school records:

- The Foundation Stone Inscription: Features the Latin text: "Patriae gloriam quaerebant Dei gloriam vident" (Translation: "They were seeking their nation's glory; they are now seeing the glory of God").
- The Revenge Bell: Sourced directly from HMS Revenge, a battleship that fought at the Battle of Jutland in World War I. It was obtained after Major Charles Thomas Major asked for a naval bell to install in the chapel tower.
- The Honour Rolls: Located on the North Wall, holding individual inscriptions representing the fallen soldiers of the school. A total of 3 Old Collegians died in the Boer War, 111 in World War I, and 102 in World War II.
- The Pulpits: Two distinct carved pulpits commemorate Stewart Templeton Reid and Stuart Graham Templeton Reid.
- The Eagle Lectern: A golden eagle representing Saint John the Evangelist, presented to the college as a gift from members of the local Jewish community.
- Seating Status: The chapel interior contains exactly 10 dedicated House Master's chairs, positioned beneath decorative carved scrolls representing the structural heads of houses.

The Chapel Windows The stained-glass windows were designed by London artist Arthur Lucien Wood and executed over a 14-year period between 1922 and 1936. They form a deliberate thematic layout across the building:

- The North Wall: Features stained-glass displays depicting the Parables of the Bible (including the Good Samaritan, the Prodigal Son, and the Pearl of Great Price).
- The South Wall: Features displays documenting the Miracles of Jesus (including the Feeding of the 5000 and the Healing at the Pool of Bethesda).
- The Sanctuary Window: Positioned at the eastern apex, depicting the Crucifixion of Jesus.
- The Eternal Light Window: Positioned over a window depicting a candle, dedicated to the memory of those lost in World War II.

=== The King's College Tapestry ===
Located within the Great Hall, the King's College Tapestry is a series of woven panels that visually document the foundational timeline of the school and its Anglican heritage:

- Panel 1 (1842): "Bishop Selwyn Coming Ashore" – Depicts Bishop Selwyn founding St John's College at Waimate North, carrying a cross (representing Christianity) and an oak tree (representing English tradition).
- Panel 2 (1896): "Foundation Day" – Features the Reverend W. Beatty (the official school Visitor) alongside founding Headmaster Graham Bruce, with the geographical landmarks of the Hauraki Gulf, Rangitoto Island, North Head, and Mount Victoria visible in the background.
- Panel 3 (1900): "C T Major goes to War" – Depicts Charles Major riding a white stallion from Graham Bruce's property as he leaves to fight in the Boer War (South African War).
- Panel 4 (1902): "St John's at the Pah" – Commemorates the boy's school established at The Pah in Onehunga.
- Panel 5 (1913): "The Amalgamation" – Marks the structural merger of St John's College and King's College. The stars on the right represent St John's, while 'The Towers' on the left represent the Remuera campus.
- Panel 6 (1922): "Move to Middlemore" – Documents the purchase of 43 acres of land from the Auckland Golf Club in 1917 and the subsequent physics move to Ōtāhuhu.
- Panel 7 (1925): "Dedication of the Chapel" – Depicts the official chapel consecration by Archbishop Averill in the presence of the Governor General.
- Panel 8 (1930): "St John's Trust Board takes Over" – Shows Canon Archdall handing the campus key to Charles Major after the school faced severe financial strain during the Great Depression.
- Panel 9 (1936): "J N Peart, DSO" – Marks the appointment of Headmaster Peart, who later left for WWII and was killed in action in Libya in 1942.
- Panel 10 (1942): "H B Lusk" – Commemorates Lusk's appointment to lead the school through its mid-century expansion.
- Panels 15–17 (1971): "The 75th Anniversary" – A triple-panel cluster celebrating the school's jubilee, depicting the academic subjects taught at the college centered around a visual representation of the Memorial Chapel.

== Headmasters ==
The following individuals have served as headmaster of King's College:

Period	Headmaster	Background, key campus milestones and institutional changes
1896–1901	Graham Bruce	Born in England; educated at London University graduating with a B.A. (Honours). Previously served as Principal of St John's College, Tamaki, and Vice-Principal of Wellington College in Shropshire, England. Established King's at "The Towers" in Remuera on 11 February 1896, introducing a balanced curriculum of Holy Scripture, classical languages (Latin and French), and commercial training. Died in 1901 at age 38. The Graham Bruce Building is named in his honor.
1901–1904	G. Bigg-Wither	Served a brief, two-year term following the sudden death of Graham Bruce, managing the school during a sharp drop in student numbers.
1904–1905	L. G. W. Wilkinson	Served a brief, transitional term focused on structural academic adjustments.
1905–1925	Major Charles Thomas Major	Educated at the University of New Zealand, earning an M.A. and B.Sc. A veteran of the Boer War (South African War) where he commanded troops while riding a white stallion. Oversaw the amalgamation with St John's Collegiate School (1913), the purchase of the Middlemore grounds (1917), and the full relocation of the senior campus to Ōtāhuhu in 1922. Secured the HMS Revenge bell and consecrated the Memorial Chapel in 1925. A prominent bronze statue of him stands on the main grounds, and his ashes are buried within the school chapel.
1926–1936	Canon H. K. Archdall	An intellectual Anglican cleric who managed the college through the financial hardships of the Great Depression. Stabilised tuition fees during a period when the school roll sat at 246 boys. Negotiated the 1930 administrative handover to the St John's College Trust Board. The Archdall Quad and Archdall Wing bear his name.
1936–1939	J. N. Peart	Oversaw the construction of the campus swimming pool. Volunteered for military service at the outbreak of World War II in 1939. Attained the rank of Lieutenant-Colonel and was killed in action in North Africa (Libya) in 1942. Peart House and the Peart Block carry his name.
1939–1947	H. B. Lusk	Originally a long-serving Housemaster of School House. Appointed Headmaster during the strains of World War II. Managed a rapidly expanding wartime roll that reached 449 boys. Formulated the original architectural brief and fundraising drive for the post-war Memorial Library. The Lusk Building bears his name.
1947–1973	G. N. T. Greenbank	The longest-serving headmaster in the school's history (26 years). Originally appointed to an 18-month temporary term, he stayed for more than two decades. Known as a strict traditionalist and stickler for protocol. Executed a major mid-century building campaign that added 5 completely new buildings, including Averill House, Parnell House, the Science Block, the West Wing, and the Music School during the school’s 75th Jubilee in 1971. Greenbank House and the Greenbank Gymnasium carry his name, and his ashes are buried within the school chapel.
1973–1987	I. P. Campbell	The first headmaster since 1939 to reside on campus with a spouse. He modernised campus culture by ending prefect caning, introducing weekly boarding options, and commissioning the Great Hall 'Tapestry' project. Most notably, he introduced co-education to King's, welcoming the first 15 senior girls in 1980 and opening Middlemore House in 1984. The Campbell Sports Complex is named after him.
1988–2002	J. S. Taylor	Oversaw a period of rapid institutional growth, with the school roll increasing from 475 to 861 students. Launched a massive pre-centennial infrastructure drive that saw the opening of Greenbank House (1997), the Hellaby Science Block upgrades, the main Quadrangle redesign, the modern Centennial Centre (2001), and the 300-seat Lecture Theatre. Taylor House carries his name.
2003–2009	R. Kelley	The first Australian to be appointed Headmaster of the college. Expanded the co-educational footprint by opening Taylor House as the second dedicated girls' house (and first for day girls). Upgraded the campus sports facilities by constructing the Olympic-specification hockey turf and an international-grade athletics track on the main cricket oval. The school roll reached 950 during his tenure, and the Kelley Centre is named in his honor.
2009–2014	B. Fenner	The second Australian appointed to lead the college. Spearheaded fundraising campaigns to complete the Kelley Design and Technology Centre and constructed the Chapel Close development in 2012. He specialized in renaming historical campus structures to preserve the memory of key historical figures before moving to lead Prince Alfred College in Adelaide.
2014–2016	M. Leach	Implemented structural boarding updates, establishing the dedicated Year 9 Boarding House system. Completed the full integration of girls into the school at the Year 11 level, bringing the school roll to 935 by the close of 2015.
2016–2026	Simon Lamb	Oversaw modern infrastructure updates, navigating the campus through modern curriculum developments and the school's 125th anniversary milestones.
2026–present	Patrick Gale	Incumbent Headmaster; appointed in 2026 after previously serving as Principal of Rangitoto College.

== Coat of Arms ==
Coat of arms of King's College
Notes King's College first applied for official arms in 1963; they were formally granted by the College of Arms in 1966. The physical Letters Patent were received by the school in 1980. Adopted 1966 Crest On a Wreath Or Gules and Azure a Conical Cap per pale Gules and Azure turned up Ermine encircled by an Ancient Crown Or and ensigned by a cross formy fitchy Argent tied about the foot and pendent to the front a Cord twisted Gules and Or and to the back Azure and Or the tassels Or Escutcheon Per pale Gules and Azure between two Chevronels Or three Estoiles each of eight points alternatively wavy and straight Argent all between three Towers each issuing from an Ancient Crown Or Motto Virtus Pollet (Good Character Prevails)

== Notable alumni ==
Alumni of the college are traditionally referred to as Old Collegians.

=== Academic ===
- George Cawkwell — ancient historian
- Richard F. Thomas — classicist

=== Arts ===
- Noel Bamford — architect
- Jack Body — composer
- John Batten — actor
- Marton Csokas — actor
- David de Lautour — actor
- Miles Gregory — founder of Pop-up Globe
- Laura Hill — actor
- Elizabeth Marvelly — singer
- Jamie McDell — singer
- George Tole — architect
- James Wallace — businessman and arts patron
- KJ Apa — actor

=== Business ===
- Jamie Beaton — founder of Crimson Education
- Sam Chisholm — former chief executive of Nine Network and British Sky Broadcasting
- Rob Fenwick — environmentalist and businessman
- Hugh Fletcher — chief executive of Fletcher Challenge
- Douglas Myers — brewer and philanthropist
- David Richwhite — merchant banker of Fay, Richwhite

=== Public Service ===
- John Manchester Allen (1901–1941) — MP for the National Party
- Douglas Rivers Bagnall, DSO DFC (1918–2001) — RAF Wing Commander, notable WWII Wellington bomber pilot
- John Percy Bayly — Member of the Legislative Council of Fiji
- Sir Peter Blanchard, KNZM, PC — Justice of the Supreme Court of New Zealand
- Roy Calvert, DFC (1913–2002) — WWII pilot
- Brian Carbury, DFC (1918–1962) — leading fighter ace of the Battle of Britain
- Sir Robert Chambers, KNZM, QC — Justice of the Supreme Court of New Zealand
- Andrew Coster — former New Zealand Police Commissioner
- Paul East, CNZM, KC, PC — former Cabinet Minister and High Commissioner to the United Kingdom
- Sir Leon Götz, KCVO (1892–1970) — MP for the National Party
- Sir John Henry, KNZM, KC — Justice of the Court of Appeal of New Zealand
- Colin Kay, CBE — former Mayor of Auckland
- John Lewis — former Headmaster of Eton College and Geelong Grammar School
- Sir Jim McLay, KNZM, QSO — former Deputy Prime Minister of New Zealand, Leader of the National Party, and Permanent Representative to the United Nations
- Simon Moore, KC — Justice of the High Court
- Sir Keith Park, GCB, KBE, MC & Bar, DFC — RAF Air Chief Marshal, key commander during the Battle of Britain
- Geoffrey Sim, QSO (1911–2002) — Member of Parliament
- George Tupou V (1948–2012) — King of Tonga from 2006 to 2012
- Sam Uffindell — Member of Parliament representing the National Party
- T. M. Wilkes, CBE, MC (1888–1958) — Controller of Civil Aviation

=== Science ===
- Charles Fleming — scientist and environmentalist
- Allan Wilson — evolutionary biologist

=== Sport ===
- Pita Alatini — All Blacks rugby player
- Teariki Ben-Nicholas — Rugby player for the Highlanders
- James Bevin — First-class cricketer
- Daniel Braid — All Blacks and Blues rugby player
- Mark Chapman — Black Caps cricketer
- Marcus Child — New Zealand hockey player
- Simon Child — New Zealand hockey player
- Mark Craig — Black Caps cricketer
- Peter Dignan — Olympic bronze medallist in rowing
- Alistair Dryden — Commonwealth Games silver medallist in rowing
- Ryan Fox — Professional Golfer
- Peter Hillary — mountaineer and adventurer
- Bill Hunt — Olympic skier
- Josh Ioane — All Blacks and Highlanders rugby player
- Mitchell Karpik — Māori All Blacks player
- Ian Kirkpatrick — All Blacks captain and flanker
- James Lay — Samoa rugby player
- Jonah Lowe — Māori All Blacks player
- Stefan Marinovic — New Zealand football goalkeeper
- Hamish Marshall — New Zealand Test cricketer
- James Marshall — New Zealand Test cricketer
- Peter Masfen — Olympic rower
- Anthony Mosse — Olympic bronze medallist swimmer
- Francis Manuleleua — rugby league player
- Jared Panchia — New Zealand hockey player
- James Parsons — All Blacks and Blues rugby player
- Marcel Renata — Māori All Blacks and Blues rugby player
- Jamie Smith — New Zealand hockey captain
- Kim Smith — Olympic long-distance runner
- Tim Southee — Black Caps cricketer
- Rob Waddell — Olympic gold medallist rower and America's Cup sailor
- Ali Williams — All Blacks lock
- Dan Williamson — Olympic gold medallist in rowing
