= Peter Wilson (field hockey) =

British field hockey player (1942–2024)

Personal information
- Born: 9 August 1942 Weston-super-Mare, England
- Died: 22 March 2024 (aged 81)
- Height: 185 cm (6 ft 1 in)
- Weight: 84 kg (185 lb)

Sport
- Sport: Field hockey
Senior career
Years	Team	Caps	Goals
1962–1965	Oxford University	-	-
1965–1966	Cliftonville	-	-
1966–1972	City of Oxford	-	-
1972–1976	Welsh Dragons	-	-
National team
Years	Team	Caps	Goals
–	Great Britain		-
–	Wales		-

Peter James Wilson (9 August 1942 – 22 March 2024) was a British field hockey player. He competed at the 1968 Summer Olympics.

== Biography ==
Wilson was born in Weston-super-Mare and educated at Dragon School and Chatham House Grammar School. While studying at St Edmund Hall at the University of Oxford, Wilson played two first-class cricket matches for Oxford University in 1964, against Hampshire and Derbyshire at Oxford. He scored 56 runs in his two matches, with a high score of 30.

He was selected for Wales in 1963 and continued to represent Wales thereafter. Wilson represented Great Britain at the 1968 Olympic Games in Mexico City in the men's tournament. At the time of his Olympic selection he played for the City of Oxford Hockey Club.

Wilson spent most of his career as a teacher at the Dragon School in Oxford, retiring in 2021. He died in March 2024, and a memorial service in his honour was held at the school on 22 September 2024.
