= Charles Cotterill Lynam =

English headmaster, yachtsman, and author

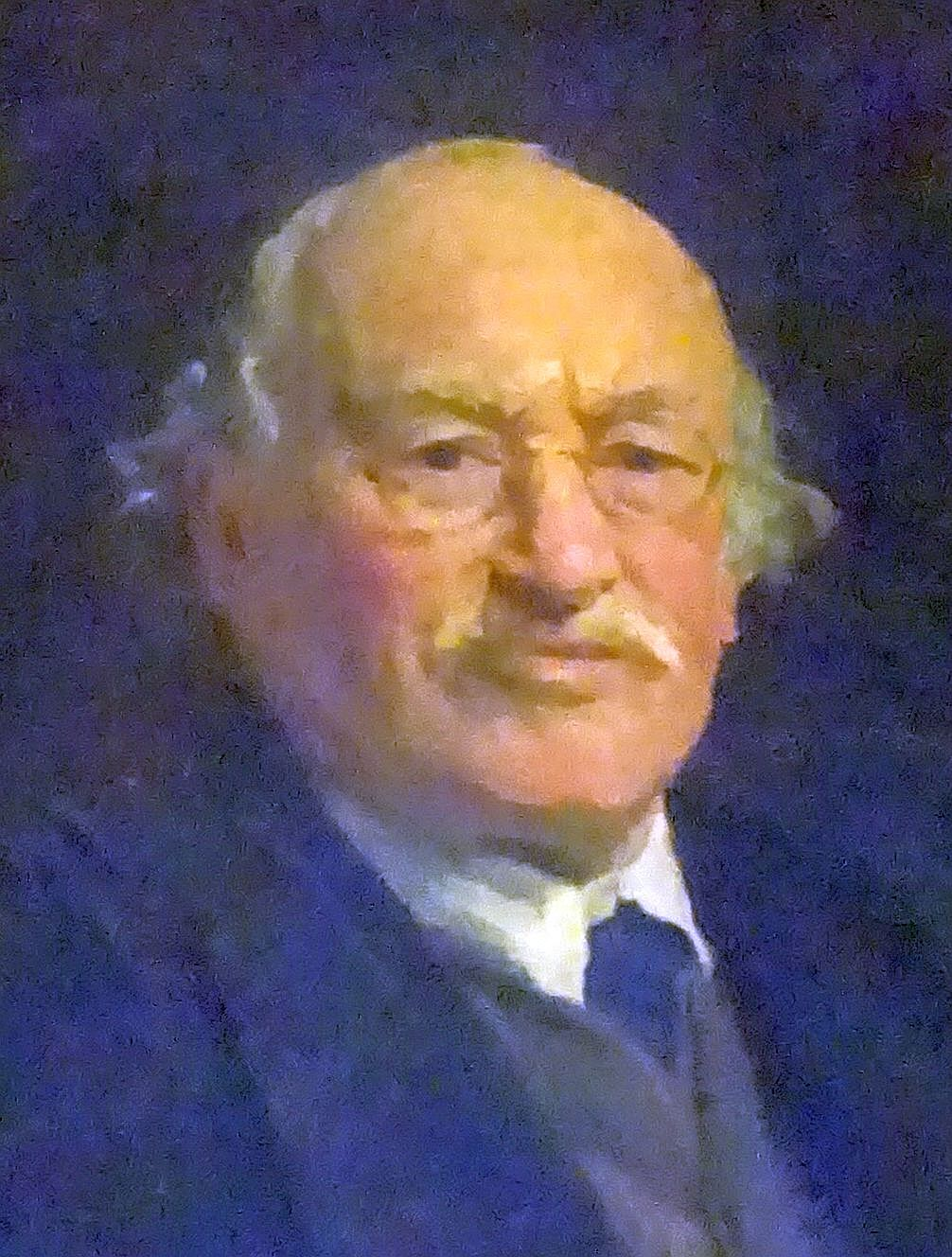
- Detail of a portrait of Lynam in the main hall at the Dragon School
- Born: 15 June 1858; Stoke-on-Trent, England
- Died: 27 October 1938 (aged 80); At sea
- Other names: "Skipper" (nickname)
- Education: King William's College; Hertford College, Oxford
- Occupation: Teacher
- Years active: 1882–1920
- Employer: Dragon School
- Known for: Headmaster of the Dragon School (1886–1920)
- Parents: Charles Lynam (father); Lucy Emma Lynham (mother)

Charles "Skipper" Cotterill Lynam (15 June 1858 – 27 October 1938) was an English headmaster, yachtsman, and writer.

== Biography ==
He was the eldest (in surviving to adulthood) of fourteen children of the architect Charles Lynam and his wife Lucy Emma. Charles Cotterill Lynam was educated at King William's College on the Isle of Man. After graduation, he worked for a short time in his father's office and then in 1879 won a scholarship to Hertford College, Oxford. There he played for the Oxford varsity chess team and the rugby football team and graduated in 1882. During his university days, he cruised and sailed on the inland waters of the River Thames.

In 1882, Lynam was appointed assistant master at the Oxford Preparatory School (now called the Dragon School). He became headmaster in 1886 and in 1895 moved the school from Crick Road to Bardwell Road into buildings designed by his father. In 1885, Charles C. Lynam married Catherine Alice Hall (1865–1957). They had one son, Garner, and one daughter, Kit. C. C. Lynam became famous for managing the school according to principles of liberal humanism, "actively encouraging originality in boys and affording them every opportunity to discover and develop their own interest and genius. He was also a strong supporter of co-education, and his daughter was the first girl to enter the school."

Charles C. Lynam enjoyed sailing and cruising and often invited friends and Dragon School's staff members to accompany him in yachting. He disliked being addressed as "Sir" and preferred to be called "Skipper".

As a yachtsman Lynam had a touch of genius. His cruises in Blue Dragon I, II, and III up the west coast of Scotland and across the North Sea to Norway and the North Cape became legendary. In recognition of the latter, a distance of 1387 miles, he was awarded the challenge cup of the Royal Cruising Club.

C. C. "Skipper" Lynam promoted subsidized tuition for talented students unable to pay the full tuition and served as the Dragon School's headmaster from 1886 to 1920, when he retired. The Dragon School was co-educational from the 1890s onwards, gained a considerable reputation for its freedoms, and was sometimes referred to as Lynam's preparatory school.

In retirement, he was a keen sailor and world traveller. At age eighty, after recently returning from a voyage to Australia, he embarked on a voyage from England to Padang aboard M. V. Alcinous (Blue Funnel Line). On the outward voyage, he died of angina and, according to his wishes, was buried at sea on 27 October 1938. R. G. Collingwood, a fellow passenger, wrote a note of sympathy to Skipper Lynam's brother Alfred Edmund "Hum" Lynam (but did not mention that a hammerhead shark and a carpenter's error nearly created an embarrassing situation).

Frank Sidgwick (1879–1939), scholar, publisher, writer of light verse, and old boy of the Dragon School, wrote The Times obituary for Mr C. C. Lynam.

== Selected publications ==
- Lynam, Charles Cotterill (1907). The Log of the "Blue Dragon," 1892–1904. Written by Various Hands and Now Revised and Set Forth by C.C. Lynam. Illustrated with Sketches, Photographs and Maps.
- Lynam, Charles Cotterill (1913). To Norway and the North Cape in 'Blue Dragon II', 1911–1912 ... Illustrated in Colour and with Photographs, Sketches and Maps.
- Lynam, Charles Cotterill (1917). Songs of the "Blue Dragon".
