= Peter Newsam =

English educationist (1928–2023)

Sir Peter Anthony Newsam (2 November 1928 – 16 November 2023) was an English educationist and a member of the Oxford Education Society. He was an alumnus of the University of Oxford and of the Department of Education.

== Biography ==
Peter Anthony Newsam was born at Gloucester, the son of William Oswald Newsam and Delphine Eugénie Lelievre. He was educated at the Dragon School and Clifton College. He then went to Queen's College, Oxford where he read Philosophy, Politics and Economics. He became a teacher, including a spell at the Dragon School from 1956 to 1958.

Newsam was chief education officer for the Inner London Education Authority from 1975 to 1981 and chairman of the Commission for Racial Equality from 1981 to 1985. He became Secretary to the Association of County Councils between 1987 and 1989. From 1989 to 1994, he was Director of the Institute of Education, University of London, where he helped lead the building of an extension which now houses the Newsam Library. He later served as Chief Schools Adjudicator from 1999 to 2002.

Newsam authored the biography of Alec Clegg in the Oxford Dictionary of National Biography. He served on the Runnymede Trust's Commission on the Future of Multi-Ethnic Britain. In 2011 he contributed an article for discussion by OES members entitled ‘Towards a totalitarian education system in England'. In 2015, he wrote a book called An Autobiography of Education.

Newsam died on 16 November 2023, at the age of 95.
