= James Bevin (cricketer) =

New Zealand physician, consultant, and cricketer

Personal information
- Full name: James Matthew Michael Bevin
- Born: 23 July 1992 (age 34); Auckland, New Zealand
- Batting: Right-handed
- Bowling: Left-arm fast-medium

Domestic team information
- Years: Team
- 2019: Oxford University

Career statistics
Competition	First-class
Matches	1
Runs scored	47
Batting average	47.00
100s/50s	–/–
Top score	29
Catches/stumpings	–/–
- Source: Cricinfo, 25 January 2020

James Matthew Michael Bevin (born 23 July 1992) is a New Zealand physician and former first-class cricketer.

Bevin was born at Auckland in July 1992. He was educated at King's College, Auckland before going up to the University of Otago to study medicine. He undertook his postgraduate studies in England at Exeter College at the University of Oxford. While studying at Oxford, he made a single appearance in first-class cricket for Oxford University against Cambridge University at Fenner's in the 2019 University Match. Batting twice in the match, Bevin was dismissed for 29 runs in the Oxford first-innings by James Vitali, while in their second-innings he was unbeaten on 18, with Oxford winning by 8 wickets. Bevin completed his postgraduate studies at Oxford in 2019, returning to New Zealand where he is employed as an urgent care doctor in Auckland.
