= Douglas Rivers Bagnall =

New Zealand-born officer in the Royal Air Force

- Bagnall outside his tent in North Africa in 1942
- Born: 23 September 1918; Auckland, New Zealand
- Died: 28 December 2000 (aged 82); Hereford, England
- Military career
- Allegiance: New Zealand
- Branch: Royal Air Force
- Service years: 1938–1965
- Rank: Wing Commander
- Service number: 40790
- Commands: No. 40 Squadron RAF (1943)
- Conflicts: Second World War
- Awards: Distinguished Service Order; Distinguished Flying Cross; Distinguished Flying Cross (United States)

Wing Commander Douglas Rivers Bagnall, DSO, DFC (23 September 1918 – 28 December 2000) was a New Zealand-born officer in the Royal Air Force. Bagnall led a number of successful Vickers Wellington operations in support of Allied forces in Sicily, Italy and the North African desert during the Second World War.

== Early life and education ==
Douglas Rivers Bagnall was born in Auckland, New Zealand, to Alfred Ernest Bagnall and Henrietta, and was educated at King's Preparatory School and King's College, Auckland, before reading commerce at Victoria University of Wellington.

== Career ==
Bagnall trained as a Royal Air Force (RAF) pilot and was commissioned in 1938. In May 1939 he was posted as a pilot officer to No. 216 Squadron, a bomber transport unit flying Vickers Valentia biplanes at Heliopolis in Egypt. By May 1942 he was acting squadron leader of No. 108 Squadron, part of No. 205 Group RAF, and flying Vickers Wellington bombers.

In March 1943, aged 24, Bagnall was promoted to wing commander of another No. 205 Group unit, No. 40 Squadron – also equipped with Wellingtons. Bagnall, though popular and outgoing, was a disciplinarian who eschewed the easy familiarity between ranks that had marked the tenure of his predecessor at 40 Squadron, John Morton. One of his first achievements as commanding officer was to re-equip the squadron with the updated and more powerful Wellington Mk III and Mk X, which replaced the obsolescent Mk IC model in service at the time.

For the next 12 months the squadron, which soon became part of the 15th United States Air Force in General Carl Spaatz's North West African Air Force, supported Allied troops in their final battles against the Germans in Tunisia. It then moved on to the Sicilian and Italian landings and campaigns.

Bagnall was awarded a Distinguished Service Order for his part in an attack on marshalling yards at Battipaglia, Italy, during the Allied amphibious assault on Salerno in 1943; and the United States Distinguished Flying Cross in 1944. He was awarded his earlier (UK) DFC while with No. 108 Squadron, in May 1942.

Bagnall's exceptional qualities as a pilot were well illustrated in a bombing raid on Recco railway viaduct, slightly to the east of Genoa, during the night of November 10, 1943. It was an interdiction mission, aimed at denying the Germans reinforcement of their positions further south. The twin-track viaduct was in a near impregnable natural position, running across a narrow defile protected by cliffs on three sides. The lead Wellington, captained by Bagnall, was armed with a 4000-pound 'blockbuster' barrel bomb on a short time-delay fuse; it was accompanied by 11 other Wellingtons and two pathfinder planes to light up the target with flares.

The bomb-aimer, Flight Lieutenant Allan Brodie, recalled: "We made five dummy runs, each one bringing us closer to the viaduct. The cliffs reared above us and to the north I could see the buildings on the outskirts of the town of Recco. On the sixth run a stick of flares exploded, providing us with perfect light but I could see we would have to get even closer to be successful...The Wing Commander assured me he could. He switched off the intercom and I felt the Wellington go into a steep bank. Round we went in the tightest turn I had ever experienced. The Wellington behaved perfectly as we came round, almost standing on a wing-tip...The aircraft was practically catapulted upwards as it gave birth to its giant bomb. The pilot increased the power as we climbed away. Every ounce of speed was necessary as we only had eleven seconds to get clear of the area before the blast... We circled back and saw a complete section of the viaduct had been destroyed and that a train emerging on the north side had been caught up in the blast."

Wing Commander Douglas Rivers Bagnall (top left) with Air Marshal H.E.P. Wigglesworth (left), at a SHAEF Air Staff briefing in February 1945

In April 1944 Bagnall, by now the longest-serving war-time commander of 40 Squadron since Major Leonard Tilney in 1917, transferred to the Joint Planning Staff of Supreme Headquarters Allied Expeditionary Force (SHAEF), where he became assistant to the Deputy Chief of Air Staff, Air Marshal H. E. P. Wigglesworth.

Electing to stay in the RAF after the war ended, Bagnall accepted the temporarily reduced rank of flight lieutenant and in July 1945 was posted to RAF Defford in Worcestershire, where he worked as a pilot experimenting with radar equipment at the Royal Radar Establishment.

In July 1950 Bagnall was posted as an RAF intelligence officer to Singapore, then still a British colony. He returned to the UK in May 1953 as part of the planning team responsible for the RAF Coronation review held in honour of the new queen, Elizabeth II. In August 1953 he was posted to the USAF's 20th Fighter Bomber Wing, based in Essex, England. In 1957 he moved to the Vulcan bomber station at RAF Scampton and, less than a year later, was doing a stint as a staff officer on Bomber Operations at the Air Ministry. His last position, which he took up early in 1963, was at the Lightning station at RAF Wattisham, Suffolk. He retired from the RAF, with the rank of wing commander, on 23 September 1965.

== Personal life ==
Bagnall married Caroline Welham in 1945. After retiring from the RAF, Bagnall and his wife spent the next 11 years sailing the world in his 60-ft ketch, Tirrenia II. He eventually settled at Hergest Croft, Kington, Herefordshire. He was an active sportsman, playing rugby for Wasps after the war, and was a keen golfer.

Douglas Rivers Bagnall died in Hereford on 28 December 2000.
