= Dragon School =

School in Oxford, England

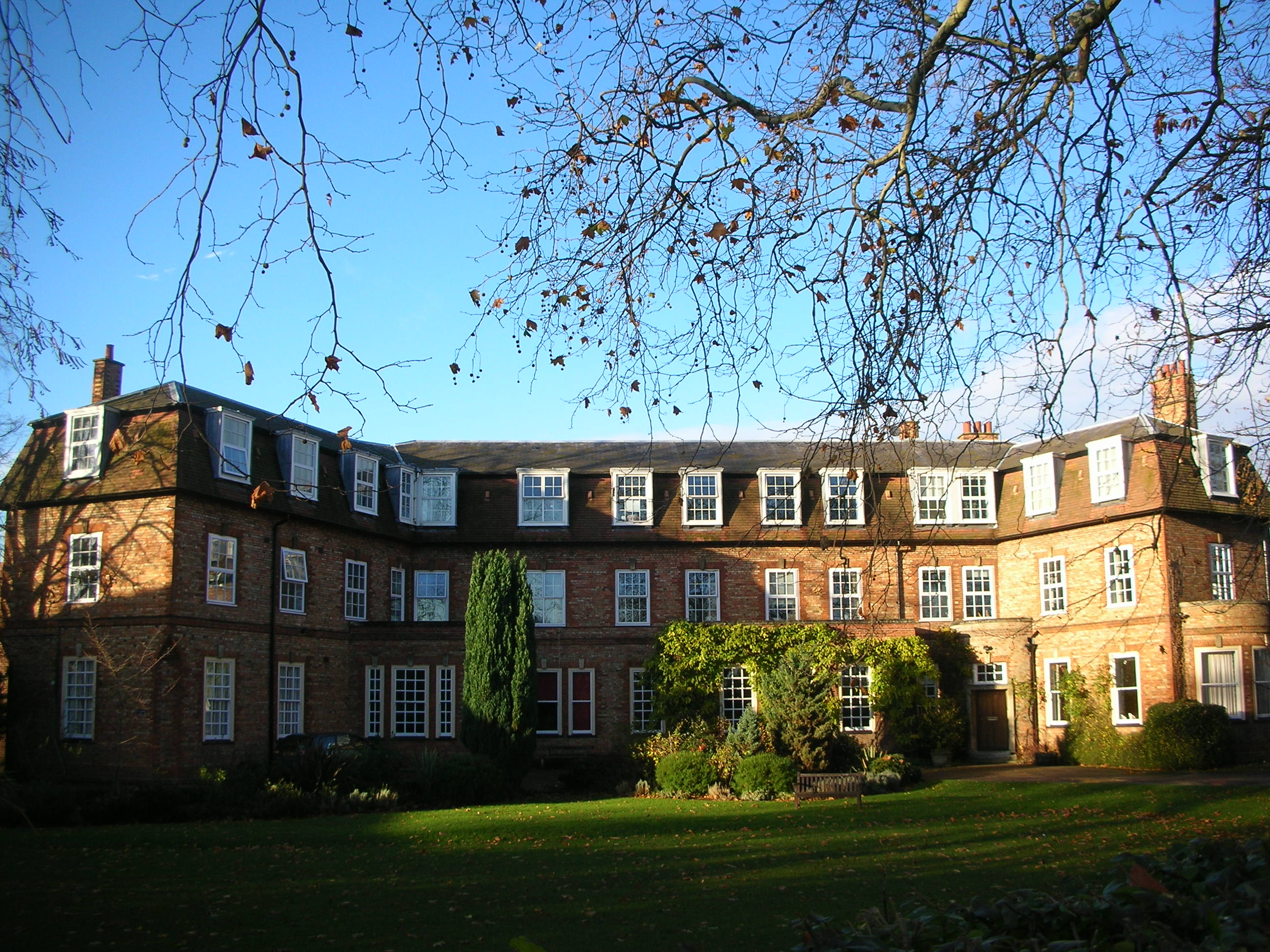

Location
- Bardwell Road; Oxford, Oxfordshire, OX2 6SS; United Kingdom; 51.76818°N 1.25639°W

Information
- Type: Preparatory day and boarding school and Pre-Prep school
- Motto: Latin: Arduus ad Solem ("Reach for the Sun")
- Religious affiliation: Church of England
- Established: 1877; 149 years ago
- Founder: A. E. Clarke
- Department for Education URN: 123288 Tables
- Head: Emma Goldsmith (Prep); Annie McNeile (Pre-Prep)
- Gender: Coeducational
- Age: 4 to 13
- Enrollment: 800+
- Houses: 9
- Colours: Navy and yellow
- Publication: The Draconian
- Former pupils: Old Dragons
- Website: www.dragonschool.org

The Dragon School is a private school in Oxford, England. It operates on two sites, the Dragon Pre-Prep (children aged 4–7) and Prep School (children aged 8–13) are both co-educational schools. The Dragon Prep School was founded in 1877 as the Oxford Preparatory School. It takes day pupils and boarders.

Originally established for boys, the Dragon School also accepted a small number of day girls with a close connection to the school, first admitting girls as boarders in 1994. The school educates children aged 4 to 13 in two sites in North Oxford: Bardwell Road and Richards Lane. Boarding starts at 8, and there are 10 boarding houses, including one weekly-boarding house. Dragon Lane runs along the edge of the school immediately to the west.

== History ==
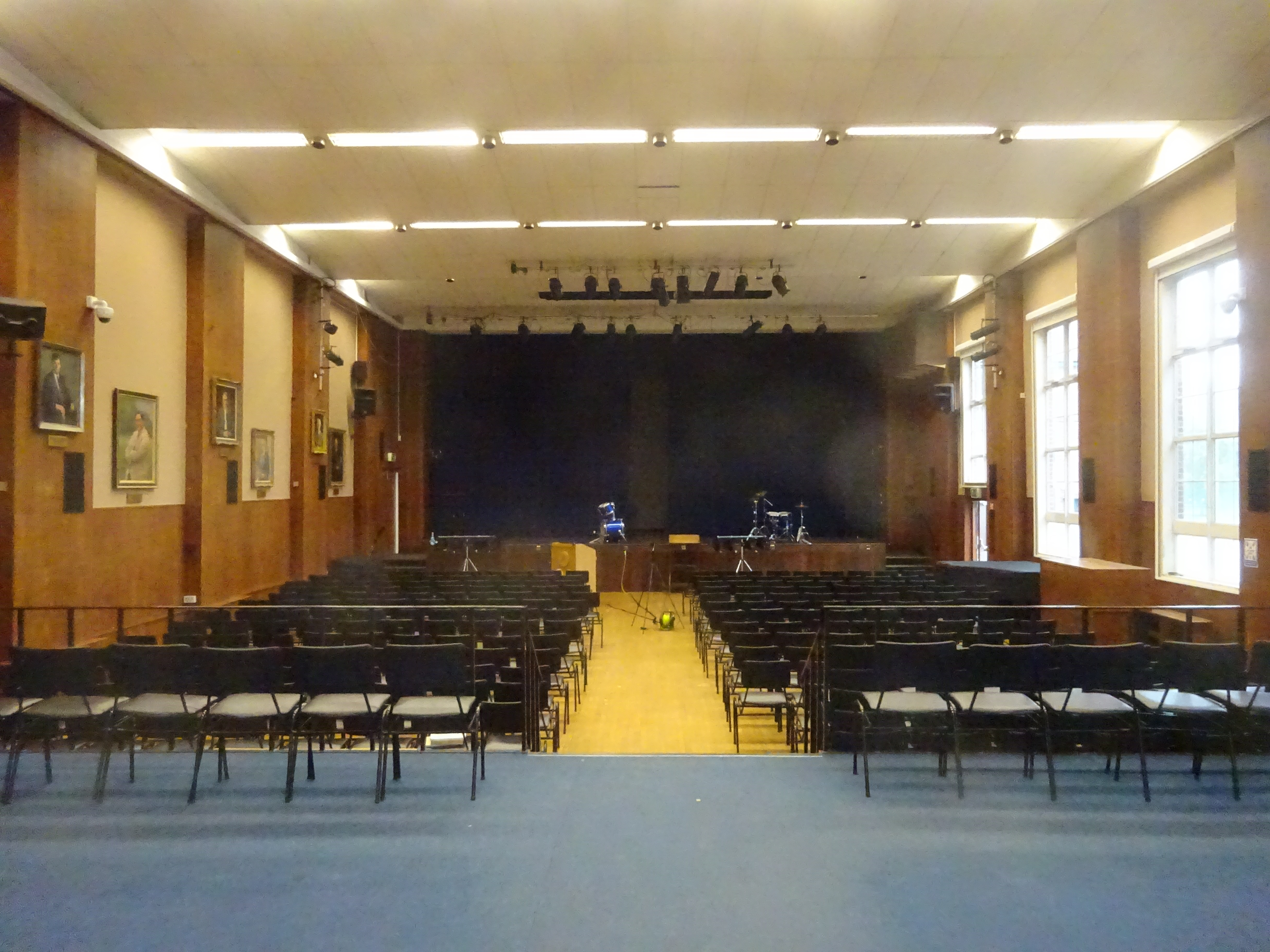
The Main Hall of Dragon School

The school was founded by a committee of Oxford dons, among whom the most active was a Mr. George. In honour of Saint George, the group decided to call themselves Dragons.

Teaching started in September 1877 at rooms in Balliol Hall, located in St Giles', Oxford, supervised by A. E. Clarke. The school expanded and moved within two years to 17 Crick Road, which became known as "School House". Charles Cotterill Lynam (known as the "Skipper") took over as headmaster in 1886.

In 1894, Lynam took out a lease on land at the current site at Bardwell Road in central North Oxford, just to the west of the River Cherwell. £4,000 was raised through subscriptions from local parents for the erection of new school buildings and the move was completed within a year. The school was known as the Oxford Preparatory School and also Lynam's, but gradually its current name was adopted.

The Dragon School became the second school to take part in the Harrow History Prize in 1895. Over the years, many of its pupils have won this prize, an early winner being Kit Lynam. The school was run for many years by the Lynam family.

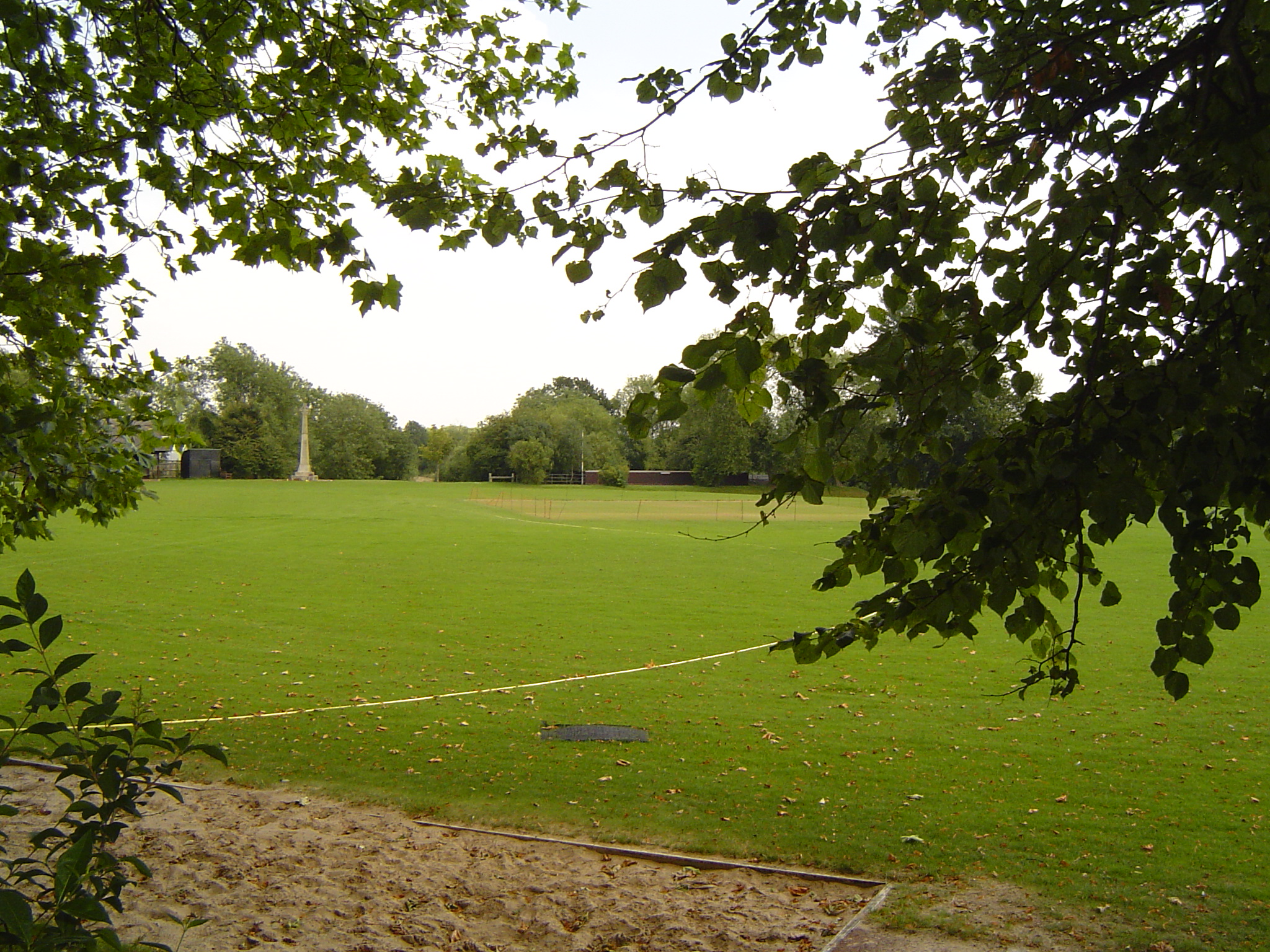
Dragon School playing fields off Bardwell Road

The school has become notable for its large number of eminent alumni.

== Heads ==
The following, including members of the Lynam family, have been Heads of the school:

- A. E. Clarke 1877–1886
- C. C. Lynam ("Skipper") 1886–1920
- A. E. Lynam ("Hum") 1920–1942
- J. H. R. Lynam ("Joc") 1942–1965
- R. K. Ingram ("Inky") 1965–1989
- M. W. A. Gover ("Guv") 1972–1989 (head of day pupils, co-headmaster with "Inky")
- N. P. V. Richardson 1989–1992
- H. E. P. Woodcock 1992–1993
- R. S. Trafford 1993–2002
- J. R. Baugh 2002–2017
- Crispin Hyde-Dunn 2017–2021
- Emma Goldsmith 2021–present

Other notable teachers include PJ Wilson, Olympic hockey player

== Old Dragons ==
Former pupils of the Dragon School are referred to as Old Dragons, and include:

- Poppy Adams, writer
- Hatti Archer, long-distance runner
- Alexander Aris (born 1973), elder son of Nobel Prize-winning democracy and human rights campaigner Aung San Suu Kyi and Michael Aris
- Baron Armstrong of Ilminster (1927–2020), civil servant
- Mary Creighton Bailey (1913–2008), classics scholar and educator
- Henry Barratt (born 1983), rugby union player
- Gawain Westray Bell (1909–1995), colonial administrator, Governor of Northern Nigeria
- Michael Beloff (born 1942), barrister, President of Trinity College, Oxford
- John Betjeman (1906–1984), poet, Poet Laureate from 1972
- Lennox Berkeley (1903–1989), composer
- Christopher Booker (1937–2019), journalist and author
- Alain de Botton (born 1969), writer and television producer
- Humphry Bowen (1929–2002), chemist and botanist
- Jonathan Bowen (born 1956), computer scientist
- Julian Brazier (born 1953), politician
- Henry Brett (born 1974), polo player, captain of the England polo team 2003–06
- James Bruce Lockhart (1941–2018) diplomat, intelligence officer, author, and artist
- Lord Bruce-Lockhart (1942–2008), politician
- Adrian Bryan-Brown (born 1956), New York-based theatrical promoter and press agent
- Marc Bryan-Brown, photographer
- Giles Bullard (1926–1992), diplomat
- Julian Bullard (1928–2006), diplomat
- John Campbell (born 1958), economist
- Humphrey Carpenter (1946–2005), journalist, author, and musician
- Bill Carritt (1908–1999), communist, college lecturer, campaigner for the Scottsboro Boys
- Noel Carritt (1910–1992), communist, International Brigadier
- Tristram Cary (1925–2008), composer
- Simon Cawkwell (born 1946), stock market commentator
- Hal Cazalet, musician
- Christopher Cazenove (1943–2010), actor
- Jonathan Cecil (1939–2011), actor
- Paul Chahidi (born 1969), actor
- Leonard Cheshire (1917–1992), World War II RAF pilot and activist for the disabled
- Colin Clark (1905–1989), economist
- Sebastian Croft (born 2001), actor
- Hugh Dancy (born 1975), actor
- Jack Davenport (born 1973), actor
- Quentin Davies, politician
- Ralph Henry Carless Davis (1918–1991), historian
- Cressida Dick (born 1960), former Commissioner (head of) Metropolitan Police London
- Henry Dimbleby (born 1970), food campaigner and businessman
- Oliver Dimsdale (born 1972), actor
- David Fasken (1932–2006), English cricketer and businessman
- Rick Fenn (born 1953) rock guitarist, member of 10cc
- Antonia Fraser (born 1932, née Pakenham), historical author
- Bernard Gadney, (1909–2000), rugby player and educator
- Douglas Gairdner, (1910–1979), pediatrician
- Hugh Gaitskell (1906–1963), politician, leader of the Labour Party from 1955 to 1963
- Christopher Geidt, Private Secretary to Queen Elizabeth II
- Tom George (born 1994), world championship rower
- Michael Gough (1916–1973), archaeologist
- Olivia Grosvenor, Duchess of Westminster (born 1992), businesswoman and peeress
- J. B. S. Haldane (1892–1964), geneticist and evolutionary biologist
- Donald Hardman, Air Chief Marshal
- Tim Henman (born 1974), tennis player
- Tom Hiddleston (born 1981), actor
- Tony Hoare (born 1934), computer scientist
- Brent Hoberman, co-founder of lastminute.com
- Tom Hollander (born 1967), actor
- Peter Hopkirk (born 1930), journalist, author
- Peter Horsley (1921–2001), Royal Air Force commander
- Frances Houghton (born 1980), rower and Olympic silver medallist
- Lord Hunt (born 1941), leading authority on turbulence modelling
- Tim Hunt, biochemist and Nobel laureate
- Edward Impey (born 1962), historian, archaeologist, museum curator, Master of the Armouries and Director General of the Royal Armouries
- Brian Inglis (1916–1993), journalist and historian
- Max Irons (born 1985), actor
- Pico Iyer (born 1957), journalist and author
- Peter Jay (born 1937), television journalist, and former BBC economics editor
- Patrick Jenkin PC (Lord Jenkin of Roding, born 1926), politician
- David Jessel, journalist
- Stephen Jessel, journalist
- C. E. M. Joad, philosopher
- Dom Joly (born 1968), comedian
- John Kendrew (1917–1997), molecular biologist and Nobel Laureate
- Andrew Lack (born 1953), biologist and botanist
- Ben Lamb, actor
- Hugh Laurie (born 1959), actor, comedian, and musician
- Paul Lee, TV director and producer
- Rupert Lowe (born 1957), politician
- Alan Macfarlane, anthropologist and historian
- Lancelot Mallalieu, politician
- Henry Marsh, (born 1950), neurosurgeon and author
- Oliver Milburn (born 1973), actor
- Hugh Miles (born 1977), journalist and author
- Naomi Mitchison (née Haldane, 1897–1999), novelist and poet
- Philip Moore, Baron Moore of Wolvercote (1921–2009), civil servant and personal private secretary to the Queen
- John Mortimer (1923–2009), playwright, barrister and novelist
- Peter Newsam (born 1928), educator (also staff)
- Roger Norrington (born 1934), musician and conductor
- Naji Abu Nowar
- Ed O'Brien (born 1968), musician (member of Radiohead)
- Rageh Omaar (born 1967), journalist and writer
- Julian Opie (born 1958), artist
- Stephen Oppenheimer (born 1947), genetic researcher and author
- Derek Parfit (1942–2017), philosopher
- Tom Penny (born 1977), skateboarder
- Ronnie Poulton-Palmer (born c. 1890), killed in the First World War, rugby player
- Jonathan Pugh (born 1962), cartoonist
- William Pye (born 1938), sculptor
- Timothy Raison (1929–2011), politician, journalist, and author
- Jack Randle (1917–1944), distinguished serviceman, T/Captain, 2nd Bn. The Royal Norfolk Regiment
- Adrian Rawlins (born 1958), actor
- Andrew Robinson (born 1957), author and journalist
- William Leefe Robinson (1895–1918), lieutenant, 39 Squadron, Royal Flying Corps
- Aubrey de Sélincourt (1894–1962), writer
- Nicholas Shakespeare (born 1957), journalist and novelist
- David Shukman (born 1958), journalist
- Henry Shukman (born 1962), poet and author
- Nevil Shute (1899–1960), novelist
- John Slessor, Marshal of the Royal Air Force
- John Smyth, 1st Baronet, serviceman, lieutenant, 15th Ludhiana Sikhs, Indian Army
- Richard Sorabji (born 1934), academic and historian of classical philosophy
- Lady Araminta Spencer-Churchill (born 2007), British equestrian and socialite
- Timothy Sprigge (1932–2007), philosopher
- Jon Stallworthy (born 1935), academic and poet
- Robin Stevens (born 1988), children's author
- Rory Stewart (born 1973), politician, author and diplomat
- Galen Strawson (born 1952), philosopher and literary critic
- Christopher Tolkien (1924–2020), son of J. R. R. Tolkien
- Simon Tolkien (born 1959), novelist and son of Christopher Tolkien
- Basil Tuma (born 2005) Reading FC striker. (Inspired and mentored by the Gaps of 2017)
- Peter Tranchell (1922–1993), musician, composer, and teacher
- The 3rd Baron Tweedsmuir (1916–2008), politician, novelist and poet
- Reginald Tyrwhitt, Royal Navy admiral
- Sam Waley-Cohen (born 1982), jockey and businessman
- Roland Walker (born 1970), British Army officer
- Tom Ward (born 1971), actor
- Paul Watkins (born 1963), Booker Prize-nominated author
- Emma Watson (born 1990), actor
- Nicholas Wheeler (born 1965), businessman, founder of Charles Tyrwhitt
- Hugo White (born 1939), Royal Navy admiral, Commander-in-Chief Fleet 1992–95
- Jack Whitehall (born 1988), comedian and actor
- Benjamin Whitrow (1937–2017), actor
- Conrad Wolfram (born 1970), technologist
- Stephen Wolfram (born 1959), scientist and technology entrepreneur
- John Woodcock (1926–2021), cricket writer
- Rupert Wyatt (born 1972), writer and filmmaker
- Shaun Wylie (1913–2009), mathematician and World War II codebreaker
- Wayne Che Yip (born 1981), director
- Janet Young, Baroness Young (1926–2002), politician
