= Marc Bryan-Brown =

American photographer

- Citizenship: American
- Education: Dragon School; Marlborough College
- Alma mater: Rochester Institute of Technology
- Occupation: Photographer
- Known for: Portrait photography; Emmy Awards photography
- Spouse: Florence Ranney Seery
- Website: www.bryan-brown.com

Marc Bryan-Brown is an officer at the Explorers Club and a photographer based in New York City, United States.

Bryan-Brown was educated in England at the Dragon School in Oxford and Marlborough College in Wiltshire. He then attended the Rochester Institute of Technology in the USA.

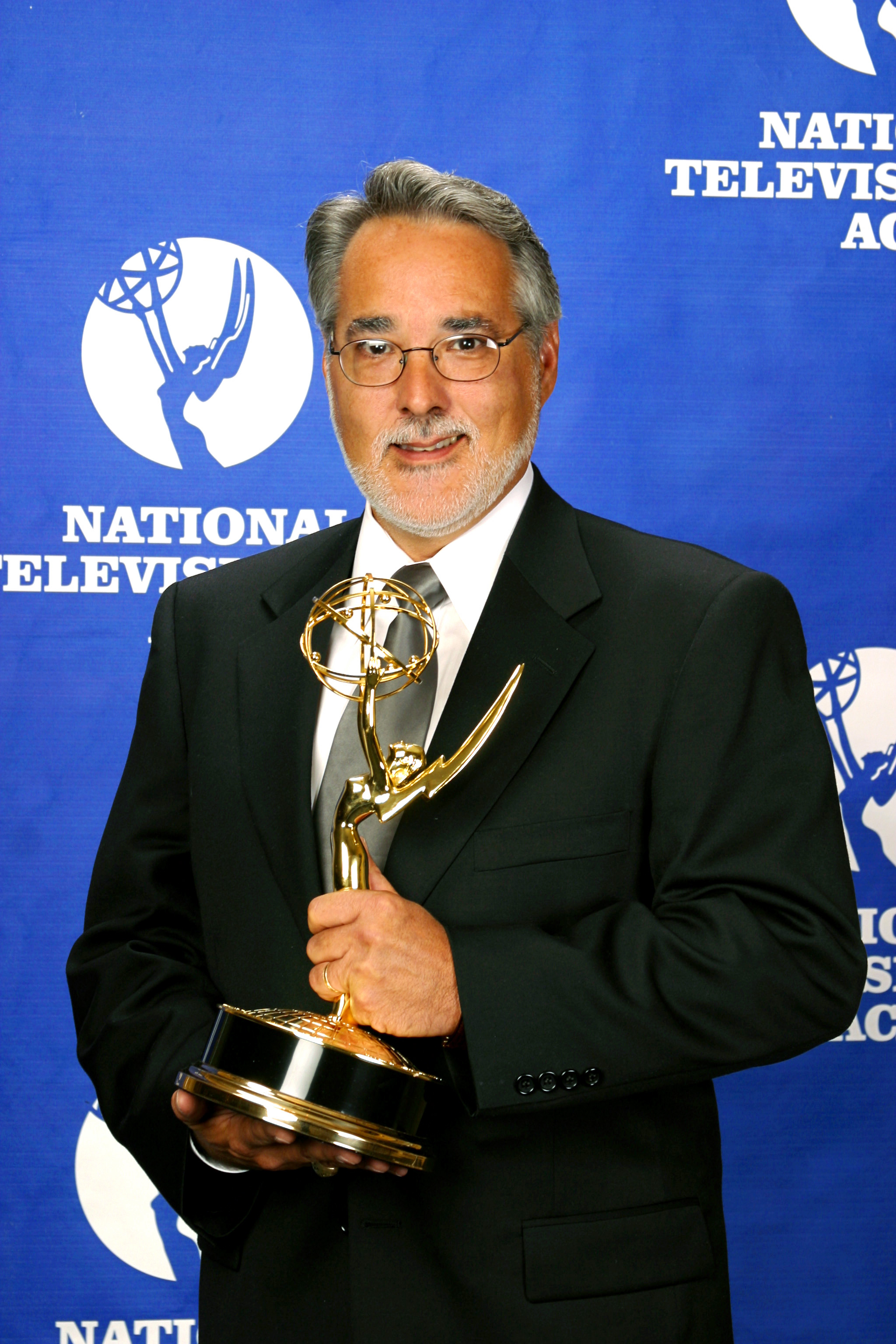
Photograph by Bryan-Brown of Allen Morris accepting an Emmy Award in 2003

Bryan-Brown has especially photographed black entertainers such as Whitney Houston, La Toya Jackson, and Nina Kennedy. He has also undertaken photography for Broadway theatre productions. His work has appeared in The Huffington Post and The Daily Beast. He was an official photographer at the NATAS Emmy Awards for over twenty years.

Bryan-Brown married Florence Ranney Seery in 1990. He is the younger brother of the theatrical press agent Adrian Bryan-Brown of Boneau/Bryan-Brown.

== Collections ==
Bryan-Brown's work is held in the following public collection:

- National Portrait Gallery, London: 3 prints of Paul Tanqueray
