= Noel Bamford =

New Zealand architect (1881–1952)

- Born: Frederick Noel Bamford; 19 November 1881; Auckland, New Zealand
- Died: 4 October 1952 (aged 70); Christchurch, New Zealand
- Education: King's College, Auckland
- Occupation: Architect
- Buildings: Ngahere; Neligan House; Coolangatta

Frederick Noel Bamford (19 November 1881 – 4 October 1952) was a New Zealand architect, active in Auckland for much of the 1910s to 1920s and designer of a number of notable and heritage listed houses in the Parnell and Remuera suburbs.

== Early life ==
Born in Auckland, New Zealand, on 19 November 1881, Frederick Noel Bamford was educated at King's College. Once his education was completed, he was apprenticed to Edward Bartley who was an Auckland-based architect. In 1903 he went to London where two years later, having passed the necessary qualifying examination, he became an associate in the Royal Institute of British Architects. He worked for a time for Edwin Lutyens before returning to Auckland around 1907.

== Professional practice ==
Bamford, who was known as Noel rather than his given first name, went into partnership with fellow architect Arthur Pierce, who had also worked for Lutyens. The pair's firm, as Bamford & Pierce, was responsible for the design of a number of houses in the affluent suburb of Parnell and Remuera in the Arts & Crafts style, although their work was also influenced by Lutyens. Among Bamford's output was Ngahere, a house in Epson built in 1908 and designated by Heritage New Zealand in April 2010 as a Historic Place Category 2 with the listing number 4501. Another was Neligan House in Parnell, built for the Bishop of Auckland in 1909–1910 and deemed a Historic Place Category 1 since 1989. Another well known property designed by Bamford was Coolangatta, a homestead in Remuera which was demolished in December 2006.

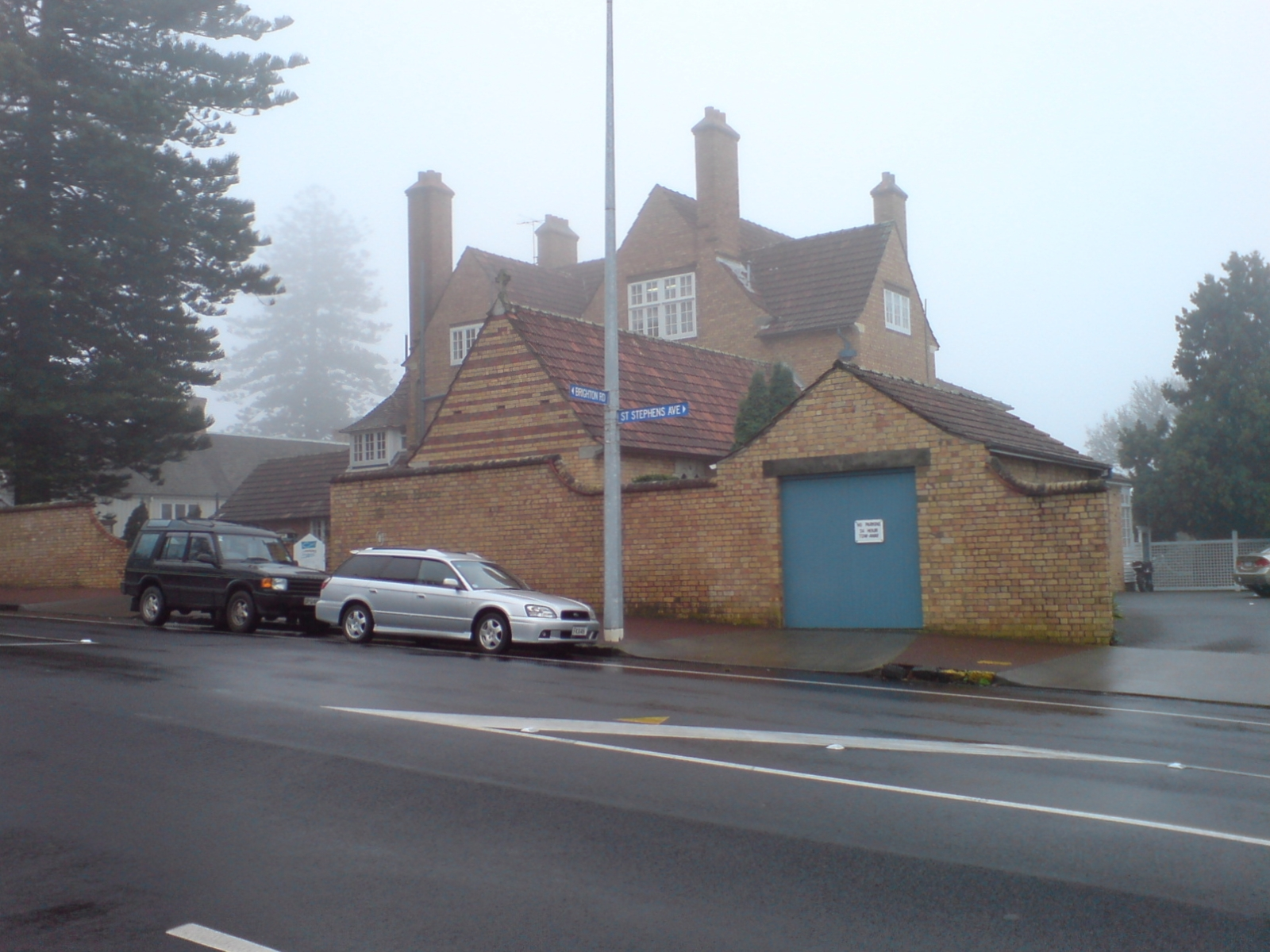
Neligan House, designed by Bamford & Pierce and built in 1909–1910

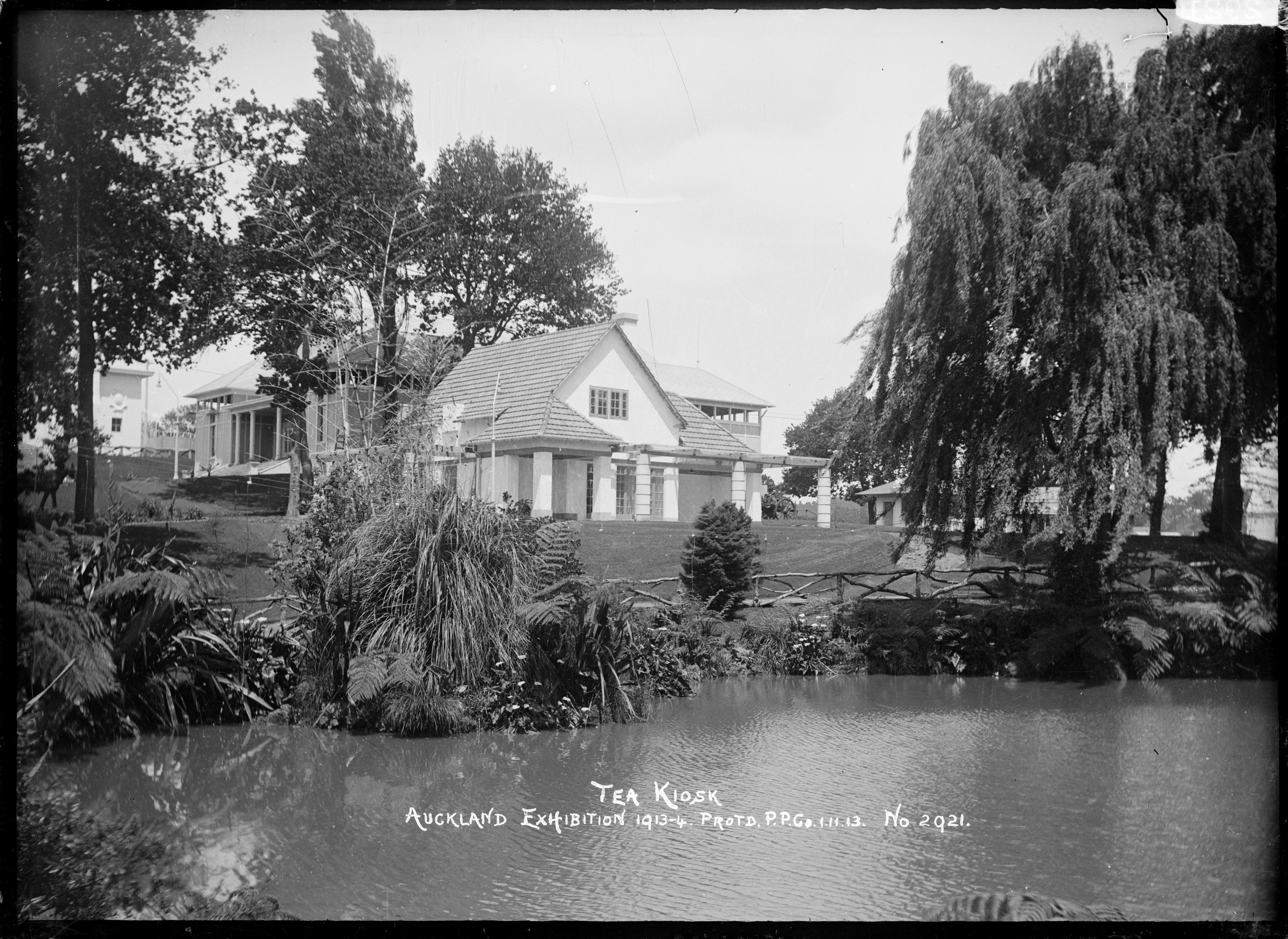
The tearoom at Auckland Domain

Bamford & Pierce were the architects for the Auckland Exhibition of 1913–1914. Of the buildings designed for the event, held at the Auckland Domain, only the tearoom survives. This is positioned between the present Wintergardens and the duck ponds. As of 2014, a café and function centre operated from the site.

After Pierce's death in October 1918 while on active service with the New Zealand Engineers in Palestine, Bamford's output declined and he also began to take commercial tenders. Prior to this, he was the first director of the Auckland School of Architecture. In his later years, Bamford became an advocate for Māori art as a member of the board of the Māori Arts, under Sir Māui Pōmare. He designed the Te Aute College Memorial Hall, incorporating aspects of Māori art in its decoration.

== Later life ==
Bamford and his family moved about Auckland in the 1930s, at one stage living in Titirangi, before relocating to Hamilton for at least a period in the 1940s. By the end of the decade they were living in Epsom. He died in 1952 in Christchurch while visiting his only child, a daughter, who resided there. He was also survived by his wife Zoe, who he had married in 1910.
