= Poppy Adams =

British film director and novelist

- Born: 1972 (age 53–54)
- Education: Dragon School; Durham University
- Occupations: Television director; producer; novelist
- Notable work: The Behaviour of Moths

Poppy Adams (born 1972) is a British television documentary director, producer and novelist. She has produced and directed documentaries for the BBC, Channel 4 and Discovery Channel.

Her debut novel, The Behaviour of Moths (2008), was shortlisted for the Costa First Novel Award.

== Early life and education ==
Adams attended the Dragon School in Oxford and studied Natural Sciences at Durham University.

== Career ==
Adams began her career producing and directing television documentaries, working on programmes for the BBC, Channel 4 and Discovery Channel.

Her first novel, The Behaviour of Moths, was published in 2008. It was shortlisted for the Costa First Novel Award and was serialised in ten episodes for BBC Radio 4's Book at Bedtime, read by Stephanie Cole. Adams was also interviewed about the novel on BBC Radio 4's Woman's Hour.

== Personal life ==
Poppy Adams lives with her husband and three children in London.
