= Keith Ingram (headmaster) =

British head teacher

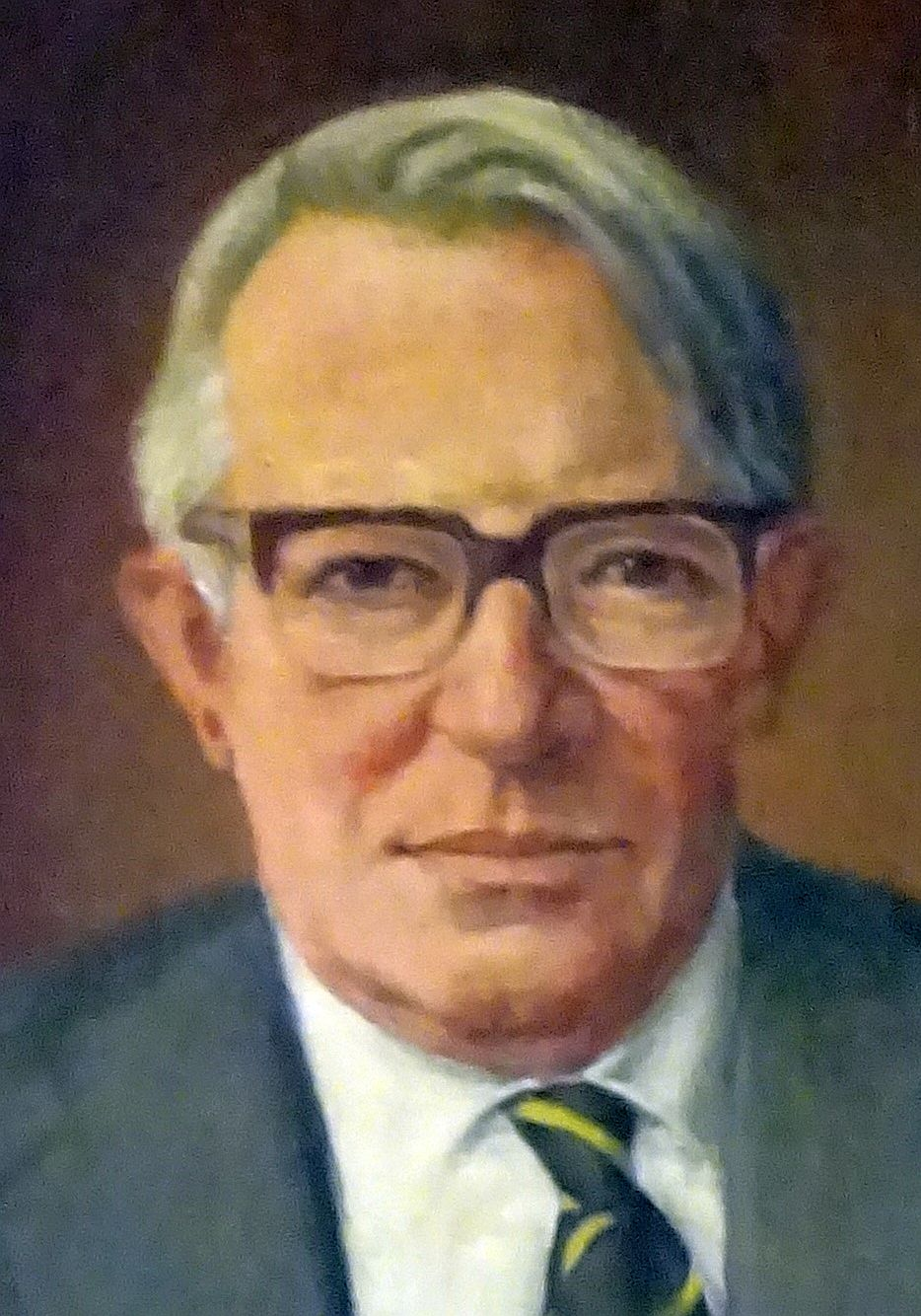
- Detail of a portrait of R. K. Ingram in the main hall at the Dragon School
- Born: 16 February 1929; Wimbledon, London, England
- Died: 5 January 2007 (aged 77); England
- Other name: "Inky" (nickname)
- Education: King's College School; Brasenose College, Oxford
- Occupation: Teacher
- Years active: 1953–1989
- Employer: Dragon School
- Known for: Headmaster of the Dragon School (1965–1989)

Richard Keith Ingram (16 February 1929 – 5 January 2007) – known by the nickname "Inky" – was a long-serving headmaster of the Dragon School in Oxford, England, from 1965 until 1989.

== Biography ==
Keith Ingram was the son of John and Marie Ingram of Wimbledon, southwest London, England. He was educated at King's College School in Wimbledon. In 1948, he left school and taught at a preparatory school in Reigate for a year. He then attended Brasenose College, Oxford, reading Greats. A sporting injury exempted him from National Service.

Ingram was offered a teaching position at the Dragon School for one term in 1953. He remained there for the rest of his career, a total of 36 years, teaching Latin and Greek and coaching rugby. In 1965, Ingram was chosen to succeed the previous headmaster Joc Lynam (1902–1978), starting a new and successful era in the history of the school. He was headmaster for 24 years, latterly jointly with Michael Gover ("Guv"; 1924–2005) from 1972. Many of his staff went on to be headmasters elsewhere. He was known for his strong speaking voice.

In 1989, he retired as headmaster of the Dragon School. He then worked for the Joint Educational Trust and was also chairman of the governors at West Hill Park School in Titchfield, Hampshire, southern England, until 1994.

== Legacy ==
The R. K. Ingram Memorial Fund ("Inky's Fund") was launched at the Dragon School in 2009. An Inky & Guv Bursaries and Hardship Fund now exists at the school.
