= George Cawkwell =

New Zealand classical scholar and historian (1919–2019)

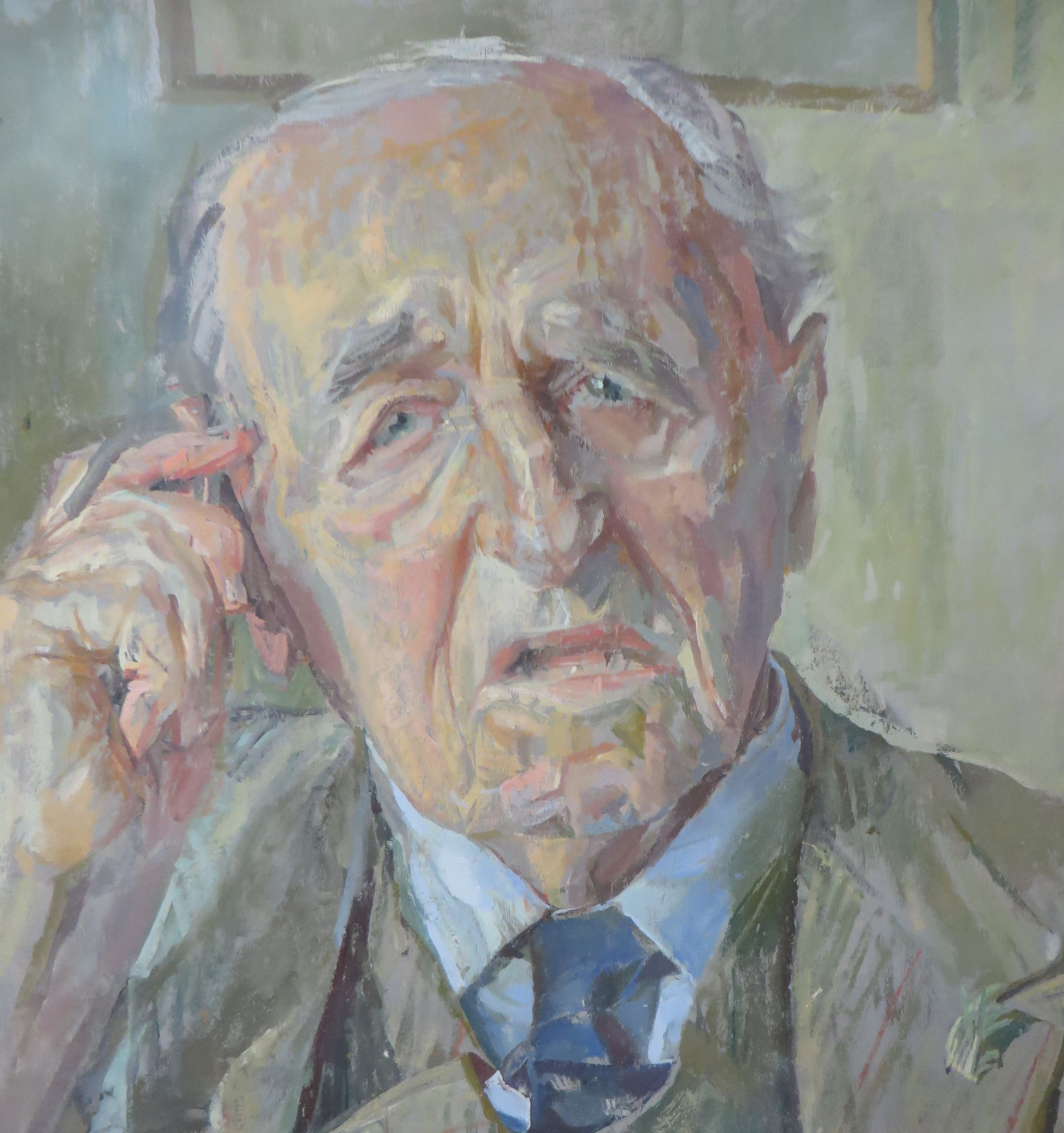
- Portrait of George Cawkwell
- Born: George Law Cawkwell; 25 October 1919; Auckland, New Zealand
- Died: 18 February 2019 (aged 99); Oxford, England
- Citizenship: British
- Occupation: Ancient historian
- Years active: 1949–2019
- Known for: History of Greece in the 4th century BC
- Spouse: Pat Clarke (m. 1945–2008 her death)
- Children: Simon Cawkwell (1946), Sarah Cawkwell, and Timothy Cawkwell
- Awards: Runciman Award (1998)

Academic background
- Education: King's College, Auckland
- Alma mater: University of Auckland, Christ Church, Oxford

Academic work
- Institutions: University College, Oxford
- Notable works: Philip of Macedon (1978); Thucydides and the Peloponnesian War (1997); The Greek Wars: The Failure of Persia (2005)
- Influenced: Robin Darwall-Smith, Rajiva Wijesinha

George Law Cawkwell (25 October 1919 – 18 February 2019) was a classical scholar who specialised in the ancient history of Greece in the 4th century BC.

== Life and career ==
Born in Auckland, New Zealand, Cawkwell was educated at King's College, Auckland, and became head boy there. He attended the University of Auckland from 1938, gaining BA and MA degrees. He joined the army in 1942 during World War II and fought with the Fijian Infantry in the Solomons in 1944.

Cawkwell was a Rhodes Scholar at Oxford University, studying at Christ Church. He played in the position of lock for the Scotland national rugby union team, gaining his cap in 1947. For most of his life, Cawkwell was a Fellow and Praelector in Ancient History of University College, Oxford. He was a Fellow from 1949 to 1987 and then became an Emeritus Fellow. He authored a number of books on ancient history. His students included the classical scholars Ernst Badian and Raphael Sealey. He won the Runciman Award in 1998 for his book Thucydides and the Peloponnesian War.

Cawkwell was the first "Procurator" of University College, fund-raising for the 750th anniversary of the college in 1999. The George Cawkwell Fellowship in Ancient History has been established at the college. A boat in the University College Boat Club is also named after him. His portrait was painted by the artist Daphne Todd.

George Cawkwell married Pat Clarke in 1945. The businessman and stock market commentator Simon Cawkwell (born 1946) is his son.

Cawkwell died on 18 February 2019 at 99 years of age.

== Selected books ==
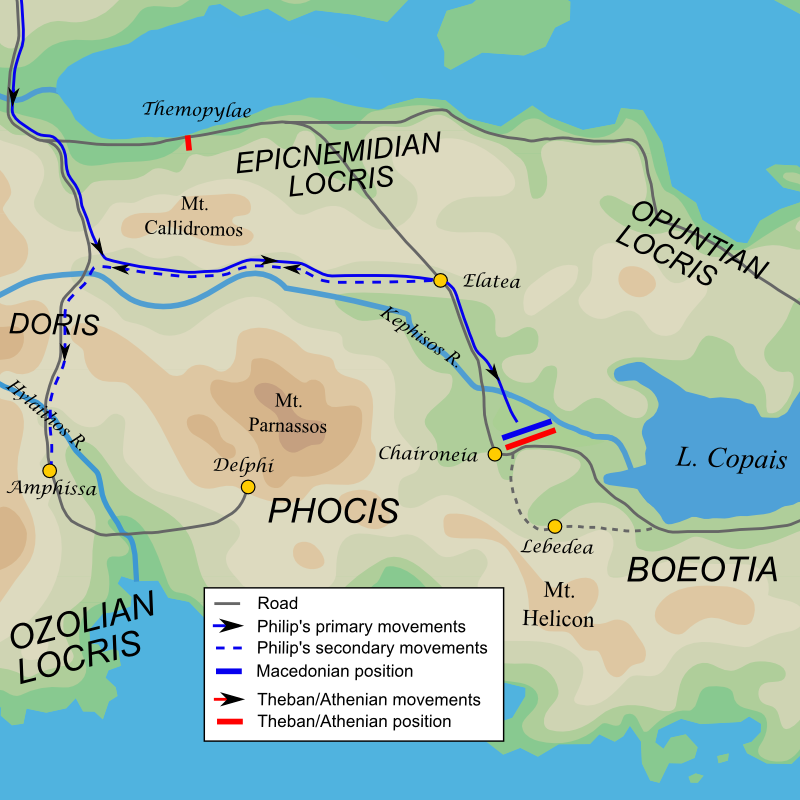
Map of Philip of Macedon's campaign in Greece, 339 BC (based on Cawkwell's book Philip of Macedon)

Cawkwell's books include:

- Philip of Macedon. Faber and Faber, 1978. ISBN 0571109586.
- Thucydides and the Peloponnesian War. Routledge, 1997. ISBN 0415165520.
- The Greek Wars: The Failure of Persia. Oxford University Press, 2005. ISBN 0-19-814871-2.

== See also ==
- List of Scotland national rugby union players
