= Chris Boneau =

American theatrical publicist

- Occupation: Theatrical publicist
- Known for: Founder of Boneau/Bryan-Brown

Chris Boneau is a veteran theatrical publicist, a communications strategist, media training consultant and professor.

Boneau formed Boneau/Bryan-Brown, a partnership with Adrian Bryan-Brown, in 1991. The company's credits include Angels in America, Art, Assassins, The Book of Mormon, The Boy from Oz, Caroline, or Change, The Color Purple, A Funny Thing Happened on the Way to the Forum, Guys and Dolls, Gypsy, The Real Thing, Spamalot, Take Me Out, Urinetown, The Who's Tommy, the Atlantic Theater Company, Manhattan Theatre Club, the Roundabout Theater Company and Walt Disney Theatrical Productions.

Mr. Boneau also serves on the Steering Committee for Broadway Cares/Equity Fights AIDS, is an adjunct professor at Columbia University's Oscar Hammerstein II Center for Theatre Studies and serves on the board of the Atlantic Theater Company.
