= BJ Watling =

New Zealand cricketer

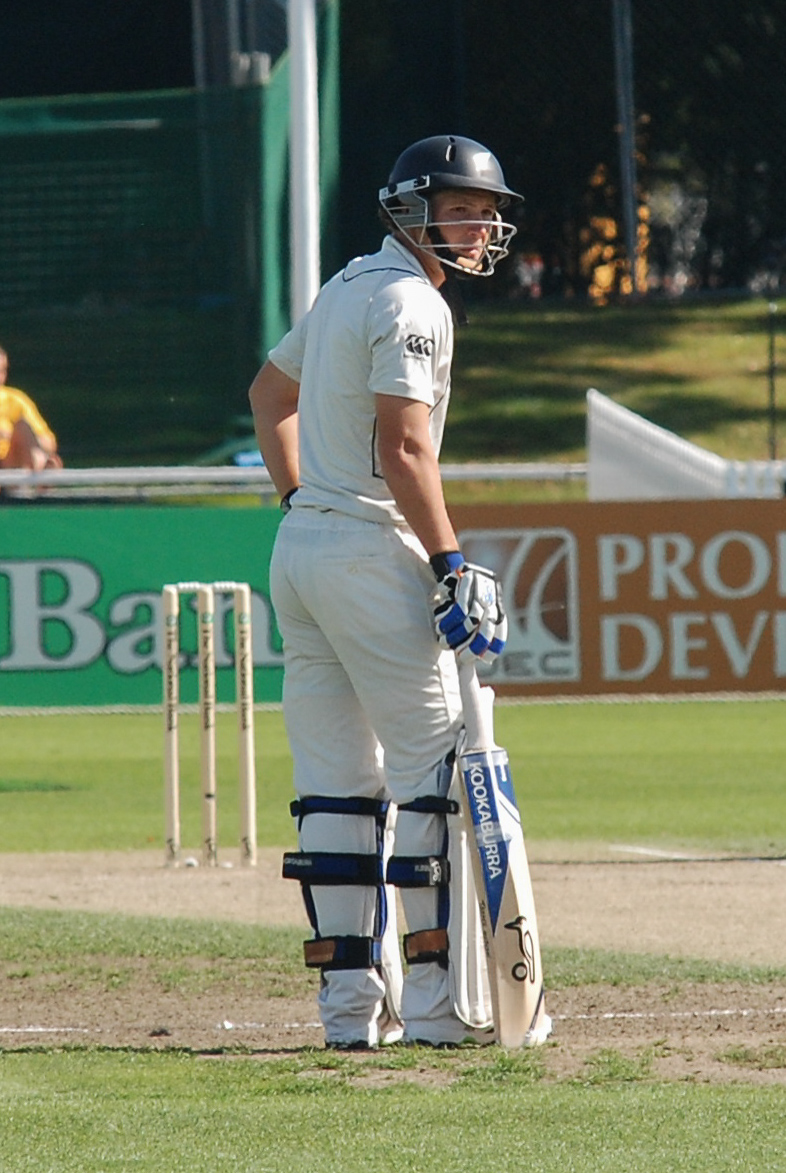
- Watling seen as the non-striker during a Test in 2010

Personal information
- Full name: Bradley-John Watling
- Born: 9 July 1985 (age 41); Durban, Natal Province, South Africa
- Batting: Right-handed
- Bowling: Right-arm off break
- Role: Wicket-keeper-batsman

International information
- National side: New Zealand (2009–2021)
- Test debut (cap 244): 11 December 2009 v Pakistan
- Last Test: 18 June 2021 v India
- ODI debut (cap 162): 13 August 2010 v Sri Lanka
- Last ODI: 11 November 2018 v Pakistan
- ODI shirt no.: 47
- T20I debut (cap 41): 12 November 2009 v Pakistan
- Last T20I: 6 July 2014 v West Indies
- T20I shirt no.: 47

Domestic team information
- Years: Team
- 2004/05–2020/21: Northern Districts
- 2019: Durham

Career statistics
Competition	Test	ODI	FC	LA
Matches	75	28	178	133
Runs scored	3,790	573	10,034	4,181
Batting average	37.52	24.91	38.44	37.66
100s/50s	8/19	0/5	18/59	8/28
Top score	205	96*	205	145*
Catches/stumpings	267/8	20/0	450/10	107/3
Medal record
Men's Cricket
Representing New Zealand
ICC World Test Championship
Winner	2019–2021
- Source: ESPNcricinfo, 23 June 2021

Bradley-John Watling (born 9 July 1985), known as BJ Watling, is a South African-born former New Zealand international cricketer who played domestically for Northern Districts. He made his Test debut in December 2009 and eight months later played his first One Day International. In 2012, Watling assumed the role of wicket-keeper in Tests.

Watling holds the record of most dismissals by a wicket-keeper for New Zealand and has been involved in the highest 6th and 7th wicket partnerships of New Zealand in Tests. He is the first wicket-keeper batsman to score a double hundred for New Zealand in Tests.

In May 2021, Watling announced his retirement from cricket following New Zealand's tour to England to play in the Test series and after winning the final of the 2019–21 ICC World Test Championship in June 2021.

== Personal life and early cricket ==
Born in South Africa, BJ Watling's family moved to New Zealand when he was 10 years old. While at Hamilton Boys' High School Watling was coached by former Test cricketer Chris Kuggeleijn. During his time at school, Watling won the Gillette Cup twice and he played in the Under-19 Cricket World Cup in 2004. One of his greatest achievements at Hamilton Boys' High School was contributing to a 200 + run partnership with Daniel Boughtwood, it remains a 1st XI record. Watling also scored 378 in the 2008 Hamilton senior club final, for Hamilton Old Boys against Eastern Suburbs.

== Domestic career ==
Watling made his first-class debut for Northern Districts against Auckland on 6 December 2004 in the State Championship. Playing as a wicket-keeper he scored 37 in the first innings while batting number eight, but in the second innings was promoted to open the batting with Nick Horsley and was dismissed for one run. In his first two first-class for Northern Districts Watling played as a wicket-keeper, but the team wanted him to play as an opening batsman instead and 'keeping fell by the wayside. Later in December Watling made his List A debut against Wellington in the State Shield. He opened the batting with Llorne Howell and was dismissed second ball without scoring a run. In September 2019 Watling joined 2nd division Durham County Cricket Club, for the final 2 games of the County Championship.

== International career ==
He was selected in New Zealand's squad to play a One Day International (ODI) and Twenty20 International series against Pakistan in Abu Dhabi and Dubai in October and November 2009. Although he was not selected in the ODI series, which New Zealand won 2–1, he made his international debut when he kept wicket in the first Twenty20 International in Dubai, which New Zealand lost by 49 runs. After showing strong form for the Knights in domestic cricket, Watling replaced Peter Fulton in New Zealand's squad for the third Test against Pakistan in December 2009. Watling opened with Tim McIntosh and they provided some uncharacteristic stability to New Zealand's opening partnership. Watling, however, was out caught after an opening stand of 60 runs. In the second innings, Watling hit an unbeaten, quickfire 60 runs from 62 balls, his first half century in Test cricket. Watling and McIntosh made an opening stand of 90 before rain ended play and any New Zealand hopes of victory.

On 13 August 2010 Watling made his ODI debut against Sri Lanka in the 2010 Triangular series. He opened the batting and top-scored for New Zealand with 55 runs from 68 deliveries in a three-wicket defeat.

When Zimbabwe toured New Zealand in January 2012, incumbent wicket-keeper Reece Young was dropped because he did not score enough runs in the previous Test against Australia. Watling and Kruger van Wyk were the front runners for the position, and Watling was eventually given the gloves for the one-off Test. His first six Tests were as a specialist batsman. Though he had kept wicket in both the T20Is he had played and two ODIs, at the time Watling had kept wicket in just two first-class matches, both of which were in 2004. New Zealand won the Test by an innings and Watling scored his first Test century, making 102 runs in the first innings. On his return to the domestic circuit with Northern Districts, Watling assumed the role of wicket-keeper to gain more experience. A hip injury prevent Watling from participating in the first Test against South Africa in March, and he was replaced by Kruger van Wyk.

Watling would finally cement his place in the New Zealand test team during the 2012/13 tour of South Africa. In a tough series for New Zealand's batsmen, Watling scored 168 runs, including back to back 50's in the second test. Dale Steyn offered praise for Watling, saying "He is a good player and he doesn't want to give his wicket away. He is a typical wicket-keeper batsman and...is a very gutsy player." Watling performed credibly on New Zealand's home and away series against England, and then scored his second test century on New Zealand's 2013 tour of Bangladesh.

On 16–17 February 2014 Watling scored 124 runs against India. His 352 run partnership with New Zealand captain Brendon McCullum was at the time the highest sixth wicket stand in test cricket history. This record was surpassed on 5–6 January 2015 by Watling and Kane Williamson with an unbroken 365 run partnership before a declaration against Sri Lanka at Wellington's Basin Reserve. Both players posted their highest test scores, with Williamson not out on 242 and Watling not out on 142. Watling has also been involved in four of the seven highest 200+ run 6th-wicket partnerships in the team's history.

Watling and Williamson's 365-run partnership was the highest 6th wicket stand until surpassed by the 399-run partnership of England players Ben Stokes and Jonny Bairstow on 3 January 2016.

In 2015, he became stand-in captain for Black Caps for the tour against England while many players are still fulfilling his duties in the Indian Premier League.

During the first test against England, he suffered an injury that stopped him from keeping behind the wickets in the second innings and most of the first innings on the field, and was moved to the outfield. His gloves were given to Tom Latham. In the second test, playing as a no. 8 batsman only, with Luke Ronchi making his test debut behind the wickets, he became the first New Zealand player to ever score a century at Headingley.

In the first test against Sri Lanka in the 2015-2016 Sri Lanka's tour to New Zealand, Watling took his 100th dismissal with his first catch of the match, and went on to take his 100th catch to finish with nine catches for the match, a New Zealand record he shares with Brendon McCullum, who has already given up wicket-keeping.

In May 2018, he was one of twenty players to be awarded a new contract for the 2018–19 season by New Zealand Cricket.

In March 2019, while playing test match against Bangladesh at Hamilton, Watling took his 202nd dismissal, the most for a New Zealand wicket-keeper in Tests, surpassing Adam Parore's record of 201.

In November 2019, while playing test match against England at Bay Oval, Watling scored his maiden double century and became the first wicket-keeper batsman for New Zealand and 9th in the history of test cricket to score double century. His 261-run partnership with Mitchell Santner became the highest ever 7th wicket partnership for New Zealand in tests, by beating the previous record of 225 by Chris Cairns and Jacob Oram against South Africa at Eden Park in 2004.

In June 2021, he officially retired from all forms of cricket after New Zealand won the inaugural edition of the ICC World Test Championship.

== Playing style ==
While Watling mostly bats at lower-middle order in international cricket, he opens for Northern Districts in Twenty20 as a pure batsman. According to Watling, he consciously modeled his batting on that of South African international Jonty Rhodes: "He wasn't the biggest hitter, more an accumulator. He hit well to the gaps and ran well between wickets. It's kind of how I like to play, or at least develop my game to be like." Watling has the best averages and high scores in Basin Reserve, and tends to score more individual runs when the team is not doing well.
