= Susan Bloch =

Theatrical press agent

Susan Del Bloch
- Born: Jan. 21, 940; United StatesCanton, N.Y.
- Died: May 10, 1982; United States
- Occupation: Press agent

Susan Del Bloch (Jan. 21, 1940 – 10 May 1982) was a theatrical press agent based in New York City.

== Biography ==
Bloch was born in Canton, New York and attended Syracuse University. She was the director of public relations for the Repertory Theater of Lincoln Center from 1965 to 1973. She ran a graduate theater course at Fordham University and produced the Theater Highlights radio program on WNCN-FM. While working at Janus Films, she established a feature film library for public television stations. She was awarded an Outer Critics Circle Award in 1971, the first such award for publicity and public relations.

Towards the end of her life, the Broadway theatre press agent Adrian Bryan-Brown, who Susan trained and mentored, worked with her.

She died from kidney disease in Tiburon, California in 1982. After her death, the Roundabout Theatre Company Stage 11 at 307 West 26th Street in Manhattan was named Susan Bloch Theater in her honor.
