= Adrian Bryan-Brown =

American theatrical promoter and press agent

- Born: 1956 (age 69–70); Oxford, England
- Citizenship: American
- Education: Dragon School; Marlborough College; Royal Holloway College; UCLA Film School
- Occupation: Theatrical press agent
- Years active: 1979–present
- Employer: Boneau/Bryan-Brown
- Known for: "one of the top press agents on Broadway"
- Spouse: Joan Marcus (1991)
- Awards: Tony Honor for Excellence in the Theatre (2015)
- Website: boneaubryanbrown.com

Adrian Bryan-Brown (born 1956) is a press agent and theatrical promoter based in Manhattan, New York City, United States. He has been involved with Broadway theatre and was called "one of the top press agents on Broadway" by the Association of Theatrical Press Agents & Managers.

== Early life and education ==
Bryan-Brown was born in Oxford, England, and grew up in London and New York. He was educated in England at the Dragon School in Oxford, Marlborough College in Wiltshire, and Royal Holloway College (University of London). He received a BSc degree in zoology in 1978. He also attended the UCLA Film School in Los Angeles briefly.

== Career ==
Bryan-Brown worked with press agent Susan Bloch. The first Broadway show he worked on was a Roundabout Theatre Company transfer, A Taste of Honey, in 1979. When Bloch died suddenly, he went to work for Roundabout itself.

In 1983, he joined Solters/Roskin/Friedman, working with Joshua Ellis on many Broadway productions. He then worked with Chris Boneau and in 1991 established Boneau/Bryan-Brown, one of the leading theatrical press agencies in New York. He has represented more than 200 shows including Tony Award-winning plays like Art, Copenhagen and The History Boys. Other plays include Frost/Nixon, Skylight and Amy's View and musicals include The Who's Tommy, Sunset Boulevard, Titanic, Jersey Boys, Monty Python's Spamalot and Mamma Mia! Further productions include: Rock 'n' Roll, The Seafarer, The Farnsworth Invention, Is He Dead?, Sunday in the Park with George, The 39 Steps, and Les Liaisons Dangereuses, directed by Rufus Norris. He also represented the 2011 Broadway production of the rock musical Spider-Man: Turn Off the Dark initially.

Bryan-Brown has also acted as a photographer, providing backstage photographs for the Associated Press and the New York Post. He has taught theatrical public relations at Brooklyn College in New York as an adjunct professor.

In 2015, Bryan-Brown was awarded a Tony Honor for Excellence in the Theatre at the Tony Awards.

== Personal life ==
Bryan-Brown married theatrical photographer Joan Marcus in 1991. They are both involved with Broadway theatre. Bryan-Brown is also the elder brother of the photographer Marc Bryan-Brown.
