= Simon Cawkwell =

British stock market commentator, share trader, and author (born 1946)

- Born: 1946 (age 79–80); Oxford, England
- Education: Dragon School, Rugby School
- Occupation: Accountant

Simon Allerton Cawkwell (born October 1946) a British stock market commentator, share trader, and author, best known for writing a thrice-weekly diary at the now dissolved T1ps.com, publicly identifying companies whose share price he believes will fall and betting his own money on such falls. He is currently an author, public speaker + podcaster, known as Evil Knievil, his best known output is Evil Takes Stock..

== Background ==
Simon Cawkwell is the son of George Cawkwell, the historian and former Vice Master of University College, Oxford. He was educated at the Dragon School, in Oxford, and Rugby School.

His first job was an Articled clerk at accountancy firm Coopers & Lybrand. He worked in Zambia as a mines cost flow and taxation forecast accountant returning to the UK in 1973.

== Trading and exposing fraud ==
Cawkwell was involved in exposing the fraud committed by Robert Maxwell specifically Maxwell Communication Corporation.

Cawkwell did his first share trade in 1967 at the age of 21 and his first short position taken was MFI in 1973, it collapsed from 150p to 10p, he also made £1 million on short-selling shares in Northern Rock, Polly Peck and Amber Day.

In the early 2000s, he made the correct prediction on the prices of gold stocks.

Cawkwell was listed amongst the World's top ten most famous traders of all time in 2019 by IG Group.

=== Short selling ===
His short selling activities were curtailed by the Short-Selling Prohibition disclosure rules in 2008 requiring notification if the short position covered more than 0.25% of a company's shares, which expired in May 2020. Further short-selling notification thresholds were announced in January 2021.

== Company directorships ==
In March 2001, Cawkwell issued a $1 million legal claim against former Russian Deputy Prime Minister Boris Fedorov, in response to moves to take control of the Russian oil and gas company Gazprom. He was a director of Tranquillo, a major shareholder in Gazprom.

Cawkwell started his own accountancy firm in Jermyn Street, Mayfair. He also founded Company Communications Centre with two former directors of Oyez Group in 1978. Cawkwell was a director of Virgin Atlantic.

He was chairman of WineBank, but efforts to save this wine trading group were not successful.

He was forced to resign as a company director of Kryso Resources (renamed China Nonferrous Gold in 2013) after he was found to have broken the rules of the AIM stock exchange by buying shares during a prohibited period.

Cawkwell was previously a director of Greasemeter Limited, Fisher Harrison Limited, Incase Solutions Limited, Custom Products Limited, and Kryso Resources Limited.

== Gambling ==
Cawkwell trades on the betting exchange Betfair, he had a long-running dispute with the firm when his wager that Niall Quinn would not become permanent manager of Sunderland AFC was lost, despite Quinn's stating that he was taking the job only temporarily. Roy Keane took over the role a few weeks later in August 2006, after Betfair had settled the market. Betfair suspended Cawkwell's account in January 2020.

He had a dispute with Sportingbet regarding the ball crossing the goal-line without a goal being given in the 2018 soccer World Cup competition. In 2014 he was reported to have made £150,000 in one week of sports betting.

Simon Cawkwell also known as "Evil Knieval" lost £150,000 in 2012 due to the collapse of the Spread Betting Company World Spreads. World Spreads went into administration after its clients' accounts were found to show a shortfall of £13 million. The Financial Conduct Authority FCA publicly censored the Chief Executive Officer of Worldspreads for market abuse and banned him from performing any roles linked to regulated activity.

Cawkwell spoke about his gambling life, business accounting, and the difference between stock market investing and betting in three interviews in November 2021.

== Books ==
- Profit of the Plunge: How to Win Short Selling - Author Simon Cawkwell, Publisher Rushmere Wynne 1 January 1995
- Bear Essentials: The Secret of Forensic Accounting and Profitable Trading - Author Simon Cawkwell, Publisher T1ps.com Limited 15 September 2003
- Evils Good: Book of Boasts and Other Investments - Author Simon Cawkwell, Edited by Tom Winnifrith, Publisher T1ps.com Limited 27 April 2012
