= Gillette Cup New Zealand Secondary Schools Cricket =

New Zealand cricket competition

Gillette Cup is the New Zealand secondary schools boys one day cricket competition. The competition begins as a knock-out competition until the top school in each of six regional zones is determined. These schools then contest a final held in Christchurch in December. The Gillette Cup was first played in 1990.

== Participants ==
The numbers of teams entered has increased fairly steadily from 75 in 1990 to 198 schools entering the 2013 competition. Regionwise the teams entered in 2013 were:

- Auckland (36)
- Northern Districts (51)
- Central Districts (41)
- Wellington (17)
- Canterbury (28)
- Otago (27)

== Winners ==
Winners of the Gillette Cup:

- 1990: Palmerston North Boys' High School
- 1991: St. Kentigern College
- 1992: Otago Boys' High School
- 1993: Otago Boys' High School
- 1994: Whangarei Boys' High School
- 1995: Wanganui Collegiate School
- 1996: St. Patrick's College, Silverstream
- 1997: Wanganui Collegiate School
- 1998: Palmerston North Boys' High School
- 1999: King's College and Christchurch Boys' High School (tied)
- 2000: Auckland Grammar School
- 2001: Wellington College
- 2002: Hamilton Boys' High School
- 2003: Hamilton Boys' High School
- 2004: Palmerston North Boys' High School and King's College (tied)
- 2005: Christchurch Boys' High School and Tauranga Boys' College (tied)
- 2006: Christchurch Boys' High School and King's College (tied)
- 2007: Christchurch Boys' High School
- 2008: Hamilton Boys' High School
- 2009: Christchurch Boys' High School
- 2010: King's College
- 2011: King's College
- 2012: Christchurch Boys' High School
- 2013: Christchurch Boys' High School
- 2014: Christchurch Boys' High School
- 2015: Hutt International Boys' School
- 2016: Christchurch Boys' High School
- 2017: Christchurch Boys' High School
- 2018: Wellington College
- 2019: St. Andrew's College
- 2020: Christchurch Boys' High School
- 2022: Christ's College, Christchurch
- 2023: Christchurch Boys' High School
- 2024: Christchurch Boys' High School
- 2025: Wellington College

== Top schools ==
Winners of the Gillette Cup:

- Christchurch Boys' High School: 13
- King's College: 5
- Hamilton Boys' High School: 3
- Palmerston North Boys' High School: 3
- Wellington College: 3
- Otago Boys' High School: 2
- Wanganui Collegiate School: 2
- Auckland Grammar School: 1
- St. Andrew's College: 1
- St. Kentigern College: 1
- St. Patrick's College, Silverstream: 1
- Tauranga Boys' College: 1
- Whangarei Boys' High School: 1
- Hutt International Boys' School: 1
- Christ's College: 1

Based on attendance at the National Final, the top schools in New Zealand are:

- 1: Otago Boys' High School (21)
- 2: Palmerston North Boys' High School (20)
- 3 Christchurch Boys' High School (19)
- 4: Hamilton Boys' High School (13)
- 5: Wanganui Collegiate School (9)
- 5: Hutt International Boys' School (9)
- 7: King's College (8)
- 7: Wellington College (8)
- 9: Westlake Boys High School (7)
- 10: Tauranga Boys' College (6)
- 11: St Paul's Collegiate School (6)
- 12: Whangarei Boys' High School (5)
- 13: New Plymouth Boys' High School (3)
- 13: Rathkeale College (3)
- 13: St. Patrick's College, Silverstream (3)
- 13: Napier Boys' High School (3)
