= Boneau/Bryan-Brown =

Public relations company

- Industry: Public relations
- Founded: 1991
- Founder: Chris Boneau; Adrian Bryan-Brown
- Headquarters: Manhattan, New York
- Website: boneaubryanbrown.com

Boneau/Bryan-Brown, Inc. is a public relations company based in Manhattan, New York, United States, largely supporting Broadway theatre productions as a theatrical press agency.

== History ==
The company was formed by the partnership of Chris Boneau and Adrian Bryan-Brown in 1991.

Before the creation of Disney on Broadway, Boneau/Bryan-Brown served as publicist and public relations strategist for Walt Disney Theatrical Productions.

The company promoted the 1992 revival of Guys and Dolls, and has since represented more than 400 on and off-Broadway productions.

The company initially represented the rock musical Spider-Man: Turn Off the Dark which finally opened on Broadway in 2011. In July 2010, the company resigned from its position as press agent for the rock musical Spider-Man: Turn Off the Dark.
