= 2014–15 Sheffield Shield season =

Australian cricket tournament

2014–15 Sheffield Shield
- Dates: 31 October 2014 – 25 March 2015
- Administrator: Cricket Australia
- Cricket format: First-class
- Tournament format(s): Double round-robin and final
- Champions: Victoria (29th title)
- Participants: 6
- Matches: 31
- Player of the series: Adam Voges (Western Australia)
- Most runs: Adam Voges (1,358) (Western Australia)
- Most wickets: (Victoria (state)) Fawad Ahmed (48) (Victoria)

The 2014–15 Sheffield Shield season was the 113th season of the Sheffield Shield, the Australian domestic first-class cricket competition. It was held after the conclusion of the Matador BBQs One-Day Cup and included a break halfway through for the entirety of the Big Bash League. Trials for day/night Tests with the pink ball continued from the previous season. This season introduced a new bonus point system based on the runs scored and wickets taken in the first 100 overs of both teams' first innings. Due to Australia and New Zealand hosting the 2015 Cricket World Cup, several matches in the later rounds could not be held at the usual home grounds of the teams. The final was contested between Victoria and Western Australia. Due to the final of the World Cup being held at the MCG, Victoria, who earned the right to host the final by finishing on top of the ladder, had to choose an alternative ground. They opted for Bellerive Oval in Hobart. The final was drawn, meaning Victoria won their 29th title by finishing on top of the table. Adam Voges was the leading run-scorer and was named man of the series, while Fawad Ahmed took the most wickets for the season. Round 4 was marred by the death of Phillip Hughes on 27 November 2014, two days after he was hit in the neck by a bouncer.

== Points table ==
Team	Pld	W	L	D	NR	BP	Pts
Victoria	10	6	3	0	1	20.43	57.43
Western Australia	10	5	1	3	1	15.84	49.84
New South Wales	10	5	3	1	1	15.26	47.26
Queensland	10	4	5	0	1	14.49	39.49
Tasmania	10	2	6	1	1	13.61	27.61
South Australia	10	2	6	1	1	10.91	24.91

== Round-Robin stage ==
Visitor team →	NSW	QLD	SA	TAS	VIC	WA
Home team ↓	NSW	QLD	SA	TAS	VIC	WA
New South Wales		NSW; Inns & 78 runs	Match abandoned	NSW; 10 wickets	NSW; 156 runs	WA; 7 wickets
Queensland	Queensland; 188 runs		Queensland; 5 wickets	Match abandoned	Queensland; Inns & 13 runs	WA; 95 runs
South Australia	NSW; 168 runs	SA; 8 wickets		SA; 5 wickets	Victoria; Inns & 46 runs	Match drawn
Tasmania	NSW; Inns & 91 runs	Queensland; Inns & 50 runs	Tasmania; 313 runs		Tasmania; 8 wickets	Match drawn
Victoria	Victoria; 9 wickets	Victoria; Inns & 14 runs	Victoria; Inns & 1 run	Victoria; 400 runs		Match abandoned
Western Australia	Match drawn	WA; 8 wickets	WA; 8 wickets	WA; 7 wickets	Victoria; 117 runs	

Home team won	Visitor team won

- Note: Results listed are according to the home (horizontal) and visitor (vertical) teams.
- Note: Click on a result to see a summary of the match.

=== Round 1 ===
31 October – 3 November
Scorecard

New South Wales	v	Victoria (H)
366 (120.5 overs); Peter Nevill 87 (140); Scott Boland 6/67 (28 overs)		5/507d (122 overs); David Hussey 129 (169); Gurinder Sandhu 3/96 (28 overs)
271 (104 overs); Ryan Carters 58 (131); Fawad Ahmed 3/49 (27 overs)		1/131 (21.2 overs); Marcus Stoinis 84* (63); Josh Hazlewood 1/40 (9 overs)

Victoria won by 9 wickets
Melbourne Cricket Ground
Umpires: Ashley Barrow and Paul Wilson

- Victoria won the toss and elected to field.
- Bonus points: Victoria 2.85, New South Wales 1.26
- First-class debuts: David King (Vic), Nick Larkin and Patrick Jackson (NSW)

31 October – 3 November
Scorecard

Queensland	v	South Australia (H)
8/443d (124.2 overs); Nick Stevens 158 (290); Chadd Sayers 3/48 (27 overs)		4/368d (111.3 overs); Callum Ferguson 100* (214); Jason Floros 4/85 (27.3 overs)
152 (61.4 overs); Joe Burns 98 (192); Chadd Sayers 6/34 (20 overs)		2/228 (50.2 overs); Mark Cosgrove 78 (95); James Hopes 1/24 (12 overs)

South Australia won by 8 wickets
Adelaide Oval
Umpires: Shawn Craig and Geoff Joshua
Player of the match: Chadd Sayers (SA)

- Queensland won the toss and elected to bat.
- Bonus points: Queensland 1.24, South Australia 1.12
- Chadd Sayers took a hat-trick in Queensland's first innings
- First-class debuts: Marnus Labuschagne and Ben McDermott (Qld)

31 October – 3 November
Scorecard

Tasmania	v	Western Australia (H)
215 (86.2 overs); Xavier Doherty 37 (38); Nathan Rimmington 5/38 (17 overs)		353 (105.1 overs); Cameron Bancroft 129 (271); Andrew Fekete 5/80 (27.1 overs)
242 (79.5 overs); Ed Cowan 100 (167); Nathan Coulter-Nile 3/34 (14 overs)		3/105 (27.5 overs); Michael Klinger 56* (70); Sam Rainbird 2/3 (5 overs)

Western Australia won by 7 wickets
Western Australia Cricket Association Ground, Perth
Umpires: Gerard Abood and Sam Nogajski
Player of the match: Nathan Rimmington (WA)

- Tasmania won the toss and elected to bat.
- Bonus points: Western Australia 2.67, Tasmania 1.15
- First-class debuts: Hamish Kingston (Tas)

=== Round 2 ===
8–11 November (D/N)
Scorecard

Victoria	v	Tasmania (H)
279 (91.1 overs); Peter Handscomb 96 (139); Andrew Fekete 4/70 (28 overs)		253 (65.5 overs); Ed Cowan 105 (120); Daniel Christian 3/28 (11 overs)
173 (60.5 overs); Daniel Christian 46 (48); Sam Rainbird 2/22 (6 overs)		2/200 (55.1 overs); Jordan Silk 97* (164); Fawad Ahmed 1/38 (9.1 overs)

Tasmania won by 8 wickets
Bellerive Oval, Hobart
Umpires: Damien Mealey and Sam Nogajski
Player of the match: Ed Cowan (Tas)

- Victoria won the toss and elected to bat.
- Bonus points: Victoria 2.29, Tasmania 2.03

8–11 November (D/N)
Scorecard

New South Wales	v	South Australia (H)
230 (102.2 overs); Nick Larkin 78 (173); Johan Botha 6/34 (32.2 overs)		293 (88.2 overs); Tom Cooper 121 (204); Mitchell Starc 4/64 (23 overs)
5/392d (104 overs); Scott Henry 142 (229); Johan Botha 3/93 (30 overs)		161 (78.3 overs); Phillip Hughes 69 (109); Steve O'Keefe 5/24 (25 overs)

New South Wales won by 168 runs
Adelaide Oval
Umpires: Gerard Abood and Wayne Knights (NZ)
Player of the match: Nick Larkin (NSW)

- New South Wales won the toss and elected to bat.
- Bonus points: New South Wales 1.77, South Australia 2.43

8–11 November (D/N)
Scorecard

Queensland	v	Western Australia (H)
163 (64.4 overs); Chris Hartley 48 (128); Nathan Rimmington 5/27 (14 overs)		357 (132 overs); Shaun Marsh 111 (196); James Hopes 5/60 (38 overs)
210 (78 overs); Greg Moller 86 (159); Jason Behrendorff 7/70 (16 overs)		2/18 (9.4 overs); Marcus Harris 10* (27); James Hopes 2/10 (5 overs)

Western Australia won by 8 wickets
Western Australia Cricket Association Ground, Perth
Umpires: Ashley Barrow and Geoff Joshua
Player of the match: Jason Behrendorff (WA)

- Queensland won the toss and elected to bat.
- Bonus points: Queensland 0, Western Australia 2.12

=== Round 3 ===
16–19 November
Scorecard

Western Australia	v	Tasmania (H)
301 (124.4 overs); Michael Klinger 100 (279); Andrew Fekete 3/67 (25.4 overs)		247 (84.4 overs); Ben Hilfenhaus 39 (40); Simon Mackin 4/54 (20 overs)
6/270d (92 overs); Adam Voges 109* (261); James Faulkner 2/50 (22 overs)		8/215 (71 overs); James Faulkner 63* (119); Simon Mackin 4/36 (16 overs)

Match drawn
Bellerive Oval, Hobart
Umpires: Bongani Jele (SA) and Paul Wilson
Player of the match: Simon Mackin (WA)

- Tasmania won the toss and elected to field.
- Bonus points: Western Australia 1.85, Tasmania 0.47

16–19 November
Scorecard

(H) Queensland	v	New South Wales
9/472d (123.4 overs); Joe Burns 183 (255); Sean Abbott 3/113 (25.4 overs)		302 (89.5 overs); Nic Maddinson 118 (161); Luke Feldman 5/83 (23 overs)
8/200d (40.4 overs); James Hopes 69* (62); Sean Abbott 3/60 (11.4 overs)		182 (59.4 overs); Peter Nevill 66* (140); Ryan Harris 4/59 (14 overs)

Queensland won by 188 runs
Brisbane Cricket Ground, Woolloongabba, Brisbane
Umpires: Shawn Craig and Damien Mealey
Player of the match: Joe Burns (Qld)

- Queensland won the toss and elected to bat.
- Bonus points: Queensland 2.86, New South Wales 1.02

16–19 November
Scorecard

(H) South Australia	v	Victoria
8/431d (118.5 overs); Callum Ferguson 140 (283); Peter Siddle 2/54 (23 overs)		7/607d (182 overs); Peter Handscomb 134 (205); Joe Mennie 3/102 (36 overs)
130 (40.3 overs); Tim Ludeman 38 (57); Peter Siddle 5/31 (12 overs)

Victoria won by an innings and 46 runs
Adelaide Oval
Umpires: Greg Davidson and Michael Graham-Smith
Player of the match: Peter Siddle (Vic)

- South Australia won the toss and elected to bat.
- Bonus points: South Australia 1.19, Victoria 1.24

=== Round 4 ===
The match between South Australia and New South Wales was abandoned after a hit to the head left Phillip Hughes in critical condition. The other matches in this round were abandoned before play on Day 2 as Hughes' condition remained unchanged. Hughes died on 27 November.

25–28 November
Scorecard

South Australia	v	New South Wales (H)
2/136 (48.3 overs); Phillip Hughes 63* (161); Shane Watson 1/7 (4 overs)

Match abandoned
Sydney Cricket Ground
Umpires: Ashley Barrow and Michael Graham-Smith

- South Australia won the toss and elected to bat.
- On Day 1, Phillip Hughes was hit in the head by a bouncer while batting and taken to hospital in a critical condition. The remainder of the day's play was immediately suspended and the match abandoned the following day. Hughes died two days later. His final score was initially recorded as "63 retired hurt" but Cricket Australia retrospectively amended the scorecard to "63 not out forever".

25–28 November
Scorecard

Western Australia	v	Victoria (H)
5/287 (96 overs); Shaun Marsh 134* (216); John Hastings 2/34 (20 overs)

Match abandoned
Melbourne Cricket Ground
Umpires: Geoff Joshua and Sam Nogajski

- Western Australia won the toss and elected to bat.

25–28 November
Scorecard

Tasmania	v	Queensland (H)
217 (78.1 overs); Jonathan Wells 47 (67); James Hopes 4/14 (20 overs)		1/73 (15 overs); Usman Khawaja 31* (35); Sam Rainbird 1/17 (4 overs)

Match abandoned
Allan Border Field, Brisbane
Umpires: Gerard Abood and Bongami Jele

- Tasmania won the toss and elected to bat.

=== Round 5 ===
Matches were originally scheduled for 5 to 8 December.

9–12 December
Scorecard

Queensland	v	New South Wales (H)
268 (83.5 overs); James Hopes 85 (106); Mitchell Starc 3/52 (16 overs)		447 (153.2 overs); Ryan Carters 198 (432); Cameron Boyce 4/160 (43.2 overs)
99 (43.2 overs); Joe Burns 27 (53); Sean Abbott 6/14 (7 overs)

New South Wales won by an innings and 78 runs
Sydney Cricket Ground
Umpires: Greg Davidson and John Ward
Player of the match: Sean Abbott (NSW)

- Queensland won the toss and elected to bat.
- Bonus points: Queensland 0.68, New South Wales 2.07

9–12 December
Scorecard

(H) Tasmania	v	South Australia
362 (113 overs); Ed Cowan 147 (253); Trent Lawford 5/82 (24 overs)		302 (92.2 overs); Mark Cosgrove 79 (164); Andrew Fekete 3/58 (19 overs)
8/298d (71 overs); Ed Cowan 158 (199); Johan Botha 3/51 (9 overs)		45 (38.3 overs); Callum Ferguson 11 (94); Ben Hilfenhaus 5/11 (14 overs)

Tasmania won by 313 runs
Bellerive Oval, Hobart
Umpires: Ashley Barrow and Shawn Craig
Player of the match: Ed Cowan (Tas)

- Tasmania won the toss and elected to bat.
- Bonus points: Tasmania 2.73, South Australia 2.02

9–12 December
Scorecard

Victoria	v	Western Australia (H)
350 (112.5 overs); Rob Quiney 92 (192); Simon Mackin 3/55 (25 overs)		287 (88.5 overs); Adam Voges 101 (167); Scott Boland 3/43 (18.5 overs)
341/3d (58.4 overs); Daniel Christian 105* (99); Simon Mackin 2/81 (10.4 overs)		287 (83 overs); Adam Voges 139* (215); Daniel Christian 3/18 (8 overs)

Victoria won by 117 runs
Western Australia Cricket Association Ground, Perth
Umpires: Gerard Abood and Damien Mealey
Player of the match: Daniel Christian (Vic)

- Western Australia won the toss and elected to field.
- Bonus points: Victoria 2.83, Western Australia 1.37

=== Round 6 ===
7–10 February
Scorecard

(H) Tasmania	v	New South Wales
272 (83.3 overs); Ed Cowan 76 (118); Sean Abbott 3/74 (15 overs)		9/576d (157 overs); Peter Nevill 235* (379); Ben Hilfenhaus 3/126 (34 overs)
213 (87.4 overs); Jordan Silk 71 (146); Doug Bollinger 5/56 (19 overs)

New South Wales won by an innings and 91 runs
Bellerive Oval, Hobart
Umpires: Gerard Abood and Michael Graham-Smith
Player of the match: Peter Nevill (NSW)

- Tasmania won the toss and elected to bat.
- Bonus Points: Tasmania 1.72, New South Wales 2.91

7–10 February
Scorecard

Victoria	v	Queensland (H)
260 (68 overs); Matthew Wade 152 (173); Peter George 5/78 (20 overs)		512 (120.4 overs); Chris Lynn 250 (329); James Pattinson 4/96 (24.4 overs)
239 (89.1 overs); Chris Rogers 69 (149); Simon Milenko 3/29 (11 overs)

Queensland won by an innings and 13 runs
Brisbane Cricket Ground, Woolloongabba, Brisbane
Umpires: Geoff Joshua and Chettithody Shamshuddin (India)
Player of the match: Chris Lynn (Qld)

- Victoria won the toss and elected to bat.
- Bonus Points: Queensland 3.56, Victoria 1.10. Michael Philipson (Qld) made his first-class debut.

7–10 February
Scorecard

South Australia	v	Western Australia (H)
328 (85 overs); Mark Cosgrove 89 (112); Adam Voges 2/15 (8 overs)		9/467d (137.2 overs); Michael Klinger 190 (301); Kane Richardson 3/92 (30 overs)
260 (86.4 overs); Callum Ferguson 84 (172); Michael Hogan 4/64 (21.4 overs)		2/122 (27 overs); Michael Klinger 51* (58); Kane Richardson 2/17 (6 overs)

Western Australia won by 8 wickets
Western Australia Cricket Association Ground, Perth
Umpires: Shawn Craig and Paul Wilson
Player of the match: Michael Klinger (WA)

- South Australia won the toss and elected to bat.
- Bonus Points: Western Australia 3.14, South Australia 1.28

=== Round 7 ===
15–18 February
Scorecard

(H) New South Wales	v	Victoria
206 (86.2 overs); Nic Maddinson 49 (116); Peter Siddle 2/37 (19 overs)		114 (50.1 overs); Marcus Stoinis 64 (138); Stephen O'Keefe 4/46 (18.1 overs)
233 (47.3 overs); Nic Maddinson 93 (85); Scott Boland 3/41 (10 overs)		169 (67.3 overs); Peter Handscomb 66 (167); Stephen O'Keefe 4/40 (18 overs)

New South Wales won by 156 runs
Robertson Oval, Wagga Wagga
Umpires: Mick Martell and Phillip Gillespie
Player of the match: Stephen O'Keefe (NSW)

- New South Wales won the toss and elected to bat
- Phillip Gillespie made his first-class debut as an umpire.
- Bonus Points: New South Wales 1.56, Victoria 1.50
- Doug Bollinger (NSW) took a hat-trick in Victoria's first innings dismissing Peter Siddle, Chris Tremain and Scott Boland in consecutive deliveries

16–19 February
Scorecard

(H) Tasmania	v	Queensland
149 (46.3 overs); Ben Dunk 71 (75); James Hopes 4/24 (15 overs)		320 (81.2 overs); James Hopes 98 (79); Jackson Bird 4/55 (18.2 overs)
121 (36.1 overs); Tim Paine 41 (62); Simon Milenko 5/15 (10.1 overs)

Queensland won by an innings and 50 runs
Bellerive Oval, Hobart
Umpires: John Ward and Chettithody Shamshuddin (India)
Player of the match: James Hopes (Qld)

- Queensland won the toss and elected to field
- Play delayed by 75 minutes at the start of Day 2 due to rain and lunch taken early also due to rain on Day 2
- Bonus Points: Tasmania 1.50, Queensland 2.70

16–19 February
Scorecard

(H) South Australia	v	Western Australia
469 (131 overs); Tom Cooper 83 (121); Ashton Agar 5/133 (39 overs)		633 (159.3 overs); Adam Voges 249 (366); Adam Zampa 3/222 (51.3 overs)
238 (78.3 overs); Adam Zampa 74 (113); Ashton Agar 5/81 (30.5 overs)		4/72 (8 overs); Shaun Marsh 44* (29); Daniel Worrall 1/29 (4 overs)

Match Drawn
Gliderol Stadium, Adelaide
Umpires: Greg Davidson and Damien Mealey
Player of the match: Ashton Agar (WA)

- South Australia won the toss and elected to bat
- Bonus Points: South Australia 1.21, Western Australia 1.79

=== Round 8 ===
24–27 February
Scorecard

Tasmania	v	South Australia (H)
364 (122.3 overs); Dom Michael 97 (215); Daniel Worrall 3/62 (28.3 overs)		295 (102.3 overs); Tom Cooper 104 (212); Jackson Bird 4/80 (19 overs)
5/219d (64 overs); Beau Webster 59 (139); Kane Richardson 2/25 (12 overs)		5/291 (79 overs); Callum Ferguson 117* (192); Jackson Bird 1/46 (17 overs)

South Australia won by 5 wickets
Gliderol Stadium, Adelaide
Umpires: Michael Graham-Smith and Mick Martell
Player of the match: Callum Ferguson (SA)

- Tasmania won the toss and elected to bat
- Bonus Points: South Australia 1.36, Tasmania 2.14

25–28 February
Scorecard

Queensland	v	Victoria (H)
207 (98 overs); Joe Burns 86 (199); Fawad Ahmed 5/50 (27 overs)		389 (118 overs); Rob Quiney 111 (165); Michael Philipson 7/107 (30 overs)
168 (58.4 overs); Peter Forrest 82* (147); Peter Siddle 3/28 (13 overs)

Victoria won by an innings and 14 runs
Traegar Park, Alice Springs
Umpires: Sam Nojagski and Greg Davidson
Player of the match: Michael Philipson (Qld)

- Queensland won the toss and elected to bat
- Bonus Points: Victoria 2.68, Queensland 1.57

25–28 February
Scorecard

(H) New South Wales	v	Western Australia
345 (116 overs); Peter Nevill 112 (248); David Moody 4/60 (20 overs)		300 (131.1 overs); Adam Voges 87 (217); Nathan Lyon 3/73 (30.1 overs)
97 (54 overs); Scott Henry 43 (114); Ashton Agar 4/22 (20 overs)		3/143 (52 overs); Adam Voges 54* (110); Sean Abbott 2/34 (11 overs)

Western Australia won by 7 wickets
No 1 Sports Ground, Newcastle
Umpires: Paul Wilson and Anthony Wilds
Player of the match: Adam Voges (WA)

- New South Wales won the toss and elected to bat
- Rain reduced Day 1 to 75 overs.
- Bonus Points: New South Wales 1.42, Western Australia 2.27

=== Round 9 ===
5–8 March
Scorecard

Tasmania	v	New South Wales (H)
237 (91.5 overs); Jordan Silk 54 (80); Stephen O'Keefe 3/37 (18.5 overs)		394 (143 overs); Gurinder Sandhu 97* (179); Clive Rose 3/110 (40 overs)
183 (62 overs); Beau Webster 83 (137); Doug Bollinger 4/23 (18 overs)		0/27 (11 overs); Scott Henry 16* (32)

New South Wales won by 10 wickets
Bankstown Oval, Sydney
Umpires: Ashley Barrow and Sam Nojagski
Player of the match: Stephen O'Keefe (NSW)

- Tasmania won the toss and elected to bat
- Bonus Points: New South Wales 1.81, Tasmania 1.37

5–8 March
Scorecard

Western Australia	v	Queensland (H)
7/417d (146.5 overs); Shaun Marsh 164* (296); James Hopes 2/54 (28.5 overs)		7/279d (94 overs); Chris Lynn 85 (142); Nathan Rimmington 2/36 (17 overs)
173 (50.5 overs); Adam Voges 59 (112); Peter George 4/31 (12.5 overs)		216 (69.3 overs); Chris Lynn 52 (69); Ashton Agar 3/41 (12.3 overs)

Western Australia won by 95 runs
Allan Border Field, Brisbane
Umpires: Paul Wilson and Geoff Joshua
Player of the match: Shaun Marsh (WA)

- Queensland won the toss and elected to field.
- Bonus Points: Queensland 0.79, Western Australia 1.27

5–8 March
Scorecard

(H) Victoria	v	South Australia
6/534d (143 overs); David Hussey 142 (170); Adam Zampa 3/145 (29 overs)		175 (57 overs); Jake Lehmann 54 (105); Peter Siddle 8/54 (18 overs)
		358f/o (125.2 overs); Travis Head 85 (233); Marcus Stoinis 3/27 (12 overs)

Victoria won by an innings and 1 run
Gliderol Stadium, Adelaide
Umpires: John Ward and Michael Graham-Smith
Player of the match: Peter Siddle (Vic)

- Victoria won the toss and elected to bat.
- Bonus Points: Victoria 3.05, South Australia 0

=== Round 10 ===
13–16 March
Scorecard

South Australia	v	Queensland (H)
230 (65.1 overs); Adam Zampa 67 (97); James Hopes 4/38 (16.1 overs)		390 (132 overs); Charlie Hemphrey 118 (268); Nick Benton 4/95 (39 overs)
458 (109.1 overs); Callum Ferguson 107 (196); Ben Cutting 5/88 (19 overs)		5/301 (63.4 overs); Joe Burns 135* (187); Joe Mennie 2/87 (19 overs)

Queensland won by 5 wickets
Brisbane Cricket Ground, Woolloongabba, Brisbane
Umpires: Sam Nojagski and Ashley Barrow
Player of the match: Joe Burns (Qld)

- Queensland won the toss and elected to field.
- Bonus Points: Queensland 2.09, South Australia 0.80

13–16 March
Scorecard

(H) Victoria	v	Tasmania
449 (128.3 overs); Peter Handscomb 104 (168); Andrew Fekete 5/66 (27 overs)		145 (44.1 overs); Dominic Michael 52 (80); Jon Holland 6/41 (17 overs)
2/230d (49 overs); Chris Rogers 69 (79); Andrew Fekete 1/40 (10 overs)		134 (53.5 overs); Tim Paine 32 (55); Fawad Ahmed 5/35 (11.5 overs)

Victoria won by 400 runs
Traegar Park, Alice Springs
Umpires: Geoff Joshua and Paul Wilson
Player of the match: Jon Holland (Vic)

- Victoria won the toss and elected to bat.
- Bonus Points: Victoria 2.89, Tasmania 0.50

13–16 March
Scorecard

New South Wales	v	Western Australia (H)
407 (113.4 overs); Moises Henriques 145 (211); Nathan Coulter-Nile 3/58 (21.4 overs)		4/483d (206.1 overs); Cameron Bancroft 211 (567); Doug Bollinger 2/60 (29 overs)

Match Drawn
Western Australia Cricket Association Ground, Perth
Umpires: John Ward and Mick Martell
Player of the match: Cameron Bancroft (WA)

- New South Wales won the toss and elected to bat.
- Bad light and rain reduced Day 1 to 64 overs and ended Day 2 early.
- Cameron Bancroft and Michael Klinger's partnership of 324 is the highest 2nd-wicket partnership in WA's history.
- Bonus Points: Western Australia 0.36, New South Wales 1.44

== Final ==
21–25 March
Scorecard

Western Australia	v	Victoria (H)
421 (134 overs); Adam Voges 107 (153); Fawad Ahmed 8/89 (40 overs)		381 (153.5 overs); Chris Rogers 112 (178); Ashton Agar 3/100 (44 overs)
2/293d (55 overs); Marcus Harris 158* (153); Peter Siddle 1/67 (16 overs)		4/158 (95 overs); Rob Quiney 53 (163); Nathan Coulter-Nile 2/31 (18 overs)

Match Drawn
Bellerive Oval, Hobart
Umpires: Mick Martell and Simon Fry
Player of the match: Marcus Harris (WA)

- Western Australia won the toss and elected to bat.
- Rain reduced Day 3 to 61 overs.
- Fawad Ahmed (Vic) took the best bowling figures in Sheffield Shield final history (8/89).

== Statistics ==
=== Most runs ===
Player	Team	Mat	Inns	NO	Runs	Ave	HS	100	50
Adam Voges	Western Australia	11	20	7	1358	104.46	249	6	5
Michael Klinger	Western Australia	11	20	2	1046	58.11	190	4	3
Cameron Bancroft	Western Australia	11	19	0	896	47.15	211	3	3
Callum Ferguson	South Australia	10	19	3	836	52.25	140	4	3
Ed Cowan	Tasmania	9	17	0	815	47.94	158	4	2

=== Most wickets ===
Player	Team	Mat	Inns	Overs	Wkts	Ave	BBI	SR
Fawad Ahmed	Victoria	11	20	359	48	24.85	8/89	44.80
Andrew Fekete	Tasmania	10	17	296.5	37	24.10	5/66	48.10
Nathan Rimmington	Western Australia	10	17	300.2	35	24.22	5/27	51.40
Ashton Agar	Western Australia	9	15	318.1	31	30.48	5/81	61.50
James Hopes	Queensland	9	15	302.4	30	21.96	5/60	60.50
