= List of Australia Twenty20 International cricket records =

A Twenty20 International (T20I) is a form of cricket, played between two of the international members of the International Cricket Council (ICC), in which each team faces a maximum of twenty overs. The matches have top-class status and are the highest T20 standard. The game is played under the rules of Twenty20 cricket. The first Twenty20 International match between two men's sides was played on 17 February 2005, involving Australia and New Zealand. Wisden Cricketers' Almanack reported that "neither side took the game especially seriously", and it was noted by Cricinfo that but for a large score for Ricky Ponting, "the concept would have shuddered". However, Ponting himself said "if it does become an international game then I'm sure the novelty won't be there all the time". This is a list of Australia Cricket team's Twenty20 International records. It is based on the List of Twenty20 International records, but concentrates solely on records dealing with the Australian cricket team. Australia played the first ever T20I in 2005.

== Key ==
The top five records are listed for each category, except for the team wins, losses, draws and ties, all round records and the partnership records. Tied records for fifth place are also included. Explanations of the general symbols and cricketing terms used in the list are given below. Specific details are provided in each category where appropriate. All records include matches played for Australia only, and are correct as of November 2021.

Key
Symbol	Meaning
†	Player or umpire is currently active in T20I cricket
‡	Event took place during a Men's T20 World Cup
*	Player remained not out or partnership remained unbroken
♠	Twenty20 International cricket record
Date	Starting date of the match
Innings	Number of innings played
Matches	Number of matches played
Opposition	The team Australia was playing against
Period	The time period when the player was active in ODI cricket
Player	The player involved in the record
Venue	Twenty20 International cricket ground where the match was played

== Team records ==
=== Overall Record ===
Matches	Won	Lost	Tied	NR	Win %
222	122	90	3	7	57.20
Last Updated: 4 February 2026

=== Team wins, losses, draws and ties ===
As of February 2026, Australia has played 222 T20I matches resulting in 122 victories, 90 defeats, 3 ties and 7 no results for an overall winning percentage of 55.71

Opponent	Matches	Won	Lost	Tied	No Result	% Won
Full Members
Afghanistan	2	1	1	0	0	50.00
Bangladesh	11	7	4	0	0	63.63
England	26	12	12	0	2	46.15
India	37	12	22	0	1	35.29
Ireland	3	3	0	0	0	100.00
New Zealand	22	15	5	1	1	68.18
Pakistan	31	14	15	1	1	46.66
South Africa	28	19	9	0	0	67.86
Sri Lanka	26	15	10	0	0	59.61
West Indies	27	16	11	0	0	59.26
Zimbabwe	4	2	2	0	0	50.00
Associate Members
Namibia	1	1	0	0	0	100.00
Oman	1	1	0	0	0	100.00
Scotland	4	4	0	0	0	100.00
United Arab Emirates	1	1	0	0	0	100.00
Total	214	121	85	3	5	56.54
Statistics are correct as of Australia v Zimbabwe at R. Premadasa Stadium, Colombo, Sri Lanka, 13 February 2026

=== First bilateral T20I series wins ===
Opponent	Year of first Home win	Year of first Away win
Bangladesh	YTP	-
England	2007	-
India	2008	2019
New Zealand	2007	2005
Pakistan	2010	2014
South Africa	2006	2014
Sri Lanka	2019	2016
United Arab Emirates	YTP	2018
West Indies	2009	2025
Last Updated: 9 August 2020

=== First T20I match wins ===
Opponent	Home		Away/Neutral	
Opponent	Venue	Year	Venue	Year
Afghanistan	Adelaide Oval, Adelaide, Australia	2022	YTP	
Bangladesh	YTP		Newlands, Cape Town, South Africa	2007
England	Sydney Cricket Ground, Sydney, Australia	2007	Newlands, Cape Town, South Africa	2007
India	Melbourne Cricket Ground, Melbourne, Australia	2008	Kensington Oval, Bridgetown, Barbados	2010
Ireland	The Gabba, Brisbane, Australia	2022	R. Premadasa Stadium, Colombo, Sri Lanka	2012
Namibia	YTP		Sir Vivian Richards Stadium, North Sound, Antigua and Barbuda	2024
New Zealand	WACA Ground, Perth, Australia	2007	Eden Park, Auckland, New Zealand	2005
Oman	YTP		Kensington Oval, Bridgetown, Barbados	2024
Pakistan	Melbourne Cricket Ground, Melbourne, Australia	2010	Darren Sammy National Cricket Stadium, Gros Islet, St Lucia	2010
South Africa	The Gabba, Brisbane, Australia	2006	Sahara Park Newlands, Cape Town, South Africa	2011
Sri Lanka	Adelaide Oval, Adelaide, Australia	2017	Newlands, Cape Town, South Africa,	2007
Scotland	YTP		Daren Sammy Cricket Ground, Gros Islet, St Lucia,	2024
United Arab Emirates	YTP		Tolerance Oval, Abu Dhabi, UAE	2018
West Indies	Bellerive Oval, Hobart, Australia	2010	Darren Sammy National Cricket Stadium, Gros Islet, Saint Lucia	2010
Zimbabwe	YTP		Harare Sports Club, Harare, Zimbabwe	2018
Last Updated: 4 November 2022

=== Team scoring records ===
==== Most runs in an innings ====
Rank	Score	Opposition	Venue	Date
1	3/263	Sri Lanka	Pallekele International Cricket Stadium, Kandy, Sri Lanka	6 September 2016
2	6/248	England	Rose Bowl, Southampton, England	29 August 2013
3	5/245	New Zealand	Eden Park, Auckland, New Zealand	16 February 2018
4	4/241	West Indies	Adelaide Oval, Adelaide, Australia	11 February 2024
5	2/233	Sri Lanka	Adelaide Oval, Adelaide, Australia	27 October 2019
Last Updated: 11 February 2024

==== Fewest runs in an innings ====
Rank	Score	Opposition	Venue	Date
1	62	Bangladesh	Sher-e-Bangla National Cricket Stadium, Mirpur, Bangladesh	9 August 2021
2	79	England	Rose Bowl, Southampton, England	13 June 2005
3	86	India	Sher-e-Bangla National Cricket Stadium, Mirpur, Bangladesh	20 March 2014‡
4	89	Pakistan	Dubai International Cricket Stadium, Dubai, UAE	5 September 2012
4	89	Pakistan	Sheikh Zayed Cricket Stadium, Abu Dhabi, UAE	24 October 2018
Last Updated: 9 August 2021

==== Most runs conceded in an innings ====
The fifth match of the 2017–18 Trans-Tasman Tri-Series against New Zealand saw Australia concede their highest innings total of 243/6.

Rank	Score	Opposition	Venue	Date
1	6/243	New Zealand	Eden Park, Auckland, New Zealand	16 February 2018
2	4/235	India	The Sports Hub, Thiruvananthpuram, India	26 November 2023
3	3/222	India	Assam Cricket Association Stadium, Guwahati, India	28 November 2023
4	5/221	England	Edgbaston Cricket Ground, Birmingham, England	27 June 2018
5	6/220	West Indies	Perth Stadium, Perth, Australia	13 February 2024
Last Updated: 13 February 2024

==== Fewest runs conceded in an innings ====
Rank	Score	Opposition	Venue	Date
1	72	Namibia	Sir Vivian Richards Stadium, St. John's, Antugua and Barbuda	13 June 2024‡
2	73	Bangladesh	Dubai International Cricket Stadium, Dubai, UAE	4 November 2021‡
3	74	India	Melbourne Cricket Ground, Melbourne, Australia	1 February 2008
3	74	Pakistan	Dubai International Cricket Stadium, Dubai, UAE	10 September 2012
5	87	Sri Lanka	Kensington Oval, Bridgetown, Barbados	9 May 2010‡
Last Updated: 11 June 2024

==== Highest match aggregates ====
Rank	Aggregate	Scores	Venue	Date
1	11/488	New Zealand (6/243) v Australia (5/245)	Eden Park, Auckland, New Zealand	16 February 2018
2	12/457	Australia (6/248) v England (6/209)	Rose Bowl, Southampton, England	29 August 2013
3	13/448	Australia (4/241) v West Indies (9/207)	Adelaide Oval, Adelaide, Australia	11 February 2024
4	8/447	India (3/222) v Australia (5/225)	Assam Cricket Association Stadium, Guwahati, India	28 November 2023
5	12/441	Australia (3/263) v Sri Lanka (9/178)	Pallekele International Cricket Stadium, Kandy, Sri Lanka	6 September 2016
Last Updated: 11 February 2024

==== Fewest runs aggregate in a match ====
Rank	Aggregate	Scores	Venue	Date
1	146/11	Namibia (72) v Australia (1/74)	Sir Vivian Richards Stadium, North Sound, Antigua and Barbuda	11 June 2024‡
2	11/149	India (74) v Australia (1/75)	Melbourne Cricket Ground, Melbourne, Australia	1 February 2008
3	12/151	Bangladesh (73) v Australia (2/78)	Dubai International Cricket Stadium, Dubai, UAE	4 November 2021‡
4	13/157	Australia (4/93) v Pakistan (9/64)	The Gabba, Brisbane, Australia	14 November 2024
5	6/161	South Africa (1/80) v Australia (5/82)	Kingsmead Cricket Ground, Durban, South Africa	12 March 2014
Last Updated: 14 November 2024

=== Result records ===
A T20I match is won when one side has scored more runs than the runs scored by the opposing side during their innings. If both sides have completed both their allocated innings and the side that fielded last has the higher aggregate of runs, it is known as a win by runs. This indicates the number of runs that they had scored more than the opposing side. If the side batting last wins the match, it is known as a win by wickets, indicating the number of wickets that were still to fall.

==== Greatest win margins (by runs) ====
Rank	Margin	Opposition	Venue	Date
1	134 runs	Sri Lanka	Adelaide Oval, Adelaide, Australia	27 October 2019
2	111 runs	South Africa	Kingsmead Cricket Ground, Durban, South Africa	30 August 2023
3	107 runs	South Africa	New Wanderers Stadium, Johannesburg, South Africa	21 February 2020
4	100 runs	Zimbabwe	Harare Sports Club, Harare, Zimbabwe	3 July 2018
5	97 runs	South Africa	Sahara Park Newlands, Cape Town, South Africa	26 February 2020
Last Updated: 30 August 2023

==== Greatest win margins (by balls remaining) ====
Rank	Balls remaining	Margin	Opposition	Venue	Date
1	86	9 wickets	Namibia	Sir Vivian Richards Stadium, St. John's, Antugua and Barbuda	13 June 2024‡
2	82	8 wickets	Bangladesh	Dubai International Cricket Stadium, Dubai, UAE	4 November 2021‡
3	62	7 wickets	Scotland	The Grange Club, Edinburgh, Scotland	4 September 2024
4	58	10 wickets	Sri Lanka	Newlands Cricket Ground, Cape Town, South Africa	20 September 2007‡
5	55	9 wickets	Pakistan	Harare Sports Club, Harare, Zimbabwe	2 July 2018
Last Updated: 4 September 2024

==== Greatest win margins ====
Rank	Margin	Opposition	Venue	Date
1	10 wickets	Sri Lanka	Newlands Cricket Ground, Cape Town, South Africa	20 September 2007‡
1	10 wickets	Pakistan	Optus Stadium, Perth, Australia	8 November 2019
1	10 wickets	Sri Lanka	R. Premadasa Stadium, Colombo, Sri Lanka	7 June 2022
4	9 wickets	Bangladesh	Newlands Cricket Ground, Cape Town, South Africa	16 September 2007‡
4	9 wickets	India	Melbourne Cricket Ground, Melbourne, Australia	1 February 2008
4	9 wickets	India	R. Premadasa Stadium, Colombo, Sri Lanka	28 September 2012‡
4	9 wickets	Pakistan	Harare Sports Club, Harare, Zimbabwe	2 July 2018
4	9 wickets	Sri Lanka	The Gabba, Brisbane, Australia	30 October 2019
4	9 wickets	Namibia	Sir Vivian Richards Stadium, St. John's, Antugua and Barbuda	11 June 2024‡
Last updated: 11 June 2024

==== Highest successful run chases ====
Rank	Score	Target	Opposition	Venue	Date
1	5/245	244	New Zealand	Eden Park, Auckland, New Zealand	16 February 2018
2	5/225	223	India	Assam Cricket Association Stadium, Guwahati, India	28 November 2023
3	4/216	216	New Zealand	Wellington Regional Stadium, Wellington, New Zealand	28 November 2023
4	4/215	215	West Indies	Warner Park, Basseterre, St Kitts and Nevis	25 July 2025
5	6/211	209	India	Inderjit Singh Bindra Stadium, Mohali, India	20 September 2022
Last Updated: 28 November 2023

==== Narrowest win margins (by runs) ====
Rank	Margin	Opposition	Venue	Date
1	1 run	New Zealand	Sydney Cricket Ground, Sydney, Australia	15 February 2009
2	2 runs	Pakistan	Melbourne Cricket Ground, Melbourne, Australia	5 February 2010
3	4 runs	England	Melbourne Cricket Ground, Melbourne, Australia	14 January 2011
3	4 runs	India	The Gabba, Brisbane, Australia	21 November 2018
3	4 runs	West Indies	Darren Sammy National Cricket Stadium, Gros Islet, Saint Lucia	14 July 2021
3	4 runs	Afghanistan	Adelaide Oval, Adelaide, Australia	4 November 2022
Last Updated: 4 November 2022

==== Narrowest win margins (by balls remaining) ====
Rank	Balls remaining	Margin	Opposition	Venue	Date
1	0	5 wickets	South Africa	New Wanderers Stadium, Johannesburg, South Africa	6 March 2016
1	0	3 wickets	India	Dr. Y.S. Rajasekhara Reddy ACA-VDCA Cricket Stadium, Visakhapatnam, India	24 February 2019
1	0	5 wickets	India	Assam Cricket Association Stadium, Guwahati, India	28 November 2023
1	0	6 wickets	New Zealand	Wellington Regional Stadium, Wellington, New Zealand	28 November 2023
Last Updated: 28 November 2023

==== Narrowest win margins (by wickets) ====
Rank	Margin	Opposition	Venue	Date
1	2 wickets	South Africa	Sydney Cricket Ground, Sydney, Australia	9 November 2014
1	2 wickets	South Africa	Cazalys Stadium, Cairns, Australia	16 August 2025
3	3 wickets	Pakistan	Darren Sammy National Cricket Stadium, Gros Islet, Saint Lucia	14 May 2010‡
3	3 wickets	Bangladesh	M. Chinnaswamy Stadium, Bangalore, India	21 March 2016‡
3	3 wickets	India	Dr. Y.S. Rajasekhara Reddy ACA-VDCA Cricket Stadium, Visakhapatnam, India	24 February 2019 ‡
3	3 wickets	Bangladesh	Sher-e-Bangla National Cricket Stadium, Mirpur, Bangladesh	7 August 2021
3	3 wickets	Pakistan	Gaddafi Stadium, Lahore, Pakistan	5 April 2022
3	3 wickets	Sri Lanka	R. Premadasa Stadium, Colombo, Sri Lanka	8 June 2022
3	3 wickets	West Indies	Carrara Stadium, Gold Coast, Australia	5 October 2022
3	3 wickets	West Indies	Sabina Park, Kingston, Jamaica	20 July 2025
3	3 wickets	West Indies	Warner Park, Basseterre, Saint Kitts and Nevis	26 July 2025
3	3 wickets	West Indies	Warner Park, Basseterre, Saint Kitts and Nevis	28 July 2025
3	3 wickets	New Zealand	Bay Oval, Mount Maunganui, New Zealand	4 October 2025
Last Updated: 4 October 2025

==== Greatest loss margins (by runs) ====
Rank	Margin	Opposition	Venue	Date
1	111 runs	Pakistan	Gaddafi Stadium, Lahore, Pakistan	1 February 2026
2	100 runs	England	Rose Bowl, Southampton, England	13 June 2005
3	90 runs	Pakistan	Gaddafi Stadium, Lahore, Pakistan	31 January 2026
4	89 runs	New Zealand	Sydney Cricket Ground, Sydney, Australia	22 October 2022‡
5	74 runs	West Indies	Ranasinghe Premadasa Stadium, Colombo, Sri Lanka	5 October 2012‡
Last Updated: 22 October 2022

==== Greatest loss margins (by balls remaining) ====
Rank	Balls remaining	Margin	Opposition	Venue	Date
1	50	8 wickets	England	Dubai International Cricket Stadium, Dubai, UAE	30 October 2021
2	31	7 wickets	Pakistan	Dubai International Cricket Stadium, Dubai, UAE	5 September 2012
2	31	6 wickets	West Indies	Darren Sammy National Cricket Stadium, Gros Islet, Saint Lucia	12 July 2021
4	27	7 wickets	New Zealand	Wellington Regional Stadium, Wellington, New Zealand	7 March 2021
5	25	7 wickets	West Indies	The Oval, London, England	6 June 2009‡
Last Updated: 30 October 2021

==== Greatest loss margins (by wickets) ====
Rank	Margins	Opposition	Most recent venue	Date
1	9 wickets	India	JSCA International Stadium Complex, Ranchi, India	7 October 2017
2	8 wickets	India	Melbourne Cricket Ground, Melbourne, Australia	3 February 2012
2	8 wickets	England	Dubai International Cricket Stadium, Dubai, UAE	30 October 2021‡
4	7 wickets	India	Brabourne Stadium, Mumbai, India	20 October 2007
4	7 wickets	West Indies	Kensington Oval, Bridgetown, Barbados	20 June 2008
4	7 wickets	Pakistan	Dubai International Cricket Stadium, Dubai, UAE	7 May 2009
4	7 wickets	West Indies	The Oval, London, England	6 June 2009‡
4	7 wickets	England	Kensington Oval, Bridgetown, Barbados	16 May 2010‡
4	7 wickets	Sri Lanka	WACA Ground, Perth, Australia	31 October 2010
4	7 wickets	Pakistan	Dubai International Cricket Stadium, Dubai, UAE	5 September 2012
4	7 wickets	South Africa	Adelaide Oval, Adelaide, Australia	5 November 2014
4	7 wickets	New Zealand	Wellington Regional Stadium, Wellington, New Zealand	7 March 2021
Last Updated: 30 October 2021

==== Narrowest loss margins (by runs) ====
Rank	Margin	Opposition	Venue	Date
1	2 runs	South Africa	New Wanderers Stadium, Johannesburg, South Africa	24 February 2006
1	2 runs	Sri Lanka	Melbourne Cricket Ground, Melbourne, Australia	28 January 2013
1	2 runs	England	Rose Bowl, Southampton, England	4 September 2020
4	4 runs	New Zealand	University Oval, Dunedin, New Zealand	25 February 2021
5	5 runs	England	Sophia Gardens, Cardiff, Wales	31 August 2015
Last Updated: 25 February 2021

==== Narrowest loss margins (by balls remaining) ====
Australia has suffered loss off the last ball four times.

Rank	Balls remaining	Margin	Opposition	Venue	Date
1	0	7 wickets	India	Sydney Cricket Ground, Sydney, Australia	31 January 2016
1	0	5 wickets	Sri Lanka	Melbourne Cricket Ground, Melbourne, Australia	17 February 2017
1	0	2 wickets	Sri Lanka	Kardinia Park, Geelong, Australia	19 February 2017
1	0	1 wickets	England	Adelaide Oval, Adelaide, Australia	12 January 2011
Last Updated: 23 November 2023

==== Narrowest loss margins (by wickets) ====
Australia has suffered defeat by 1 wicket once.

Rank	Margin	Opposition	Venue	Date
1	1 wicket	England	Adelaide Oval, Adelaide, Australia	12 January 2011
2	2 wickets	Sri Lanka	Kardinia Park, Geelong, Australia	19 February 2017
2	2 wickets	India	ACA–VDCA Cricket Stadium, Visakhapatnam, India	23 November 2023
4	3 wickets	South Africa	New Wanderers Stadium, Johannesburg, South Africa	16 October 2011
4	3 wickets	South Africa	Kingsmead Cricket Ground, Durban, South Africa	4 March 2016
4	3 wickets	England	Sophia Gardens, Cardiff, England	13 September 2024
Last Updated: 13 September 2024

==== Tied matches ====
A tie can occur when the scores of both teams are equal at the conclusion of play, provided that the side batting last has completed their innings.

Opposition	Venue	Date
New Zealand	Lancaster Park, Christchurch, New Zealand	28 February 2010
Pakistan	Dubai International Cricket Stadium, Dubai, UAE	7 September 2012
Sri Lanka	Sydney Cricket Ground, Sydney, Australia	13 February 2022
Last updated: 13 February 2022

== Batting records ==
=== Most career runs ===
A run is the basic means of scoring in cricket. A run is scored when the batsman hits the ball with his bat and with his partner runs the length of 22 yards (20 m) of the pitch. Pakistan's Babar Azam has scored the most runs in T20Is with 4,453. Second and third are Rohit Sharma and Virat Kohli from India, with 4,231 and 4,188, respectively.

Rank	Runs	Player	Matches	Innings	Average	100	50	Period
1	3,277	David Warner	110	110	33.43	1	28	2009–2024
2	3,120	Aaron Finch	103	103	34.28	2	19	2011–2022
3	2,835	Glenn Maxwell†	126	115	29.22	5	12	2012–2025
4	2,102	Mitchell Marsh†	83	78	32.33	1	11	2011–2026
5	1,462	Shane Watson	58	56	29.24	1	10	2006–2016
6	1,361	Marcus Stoinis†	83	67	31.65	0	6	2015–2026
7	1,224	Travis Head†	48	45	29.19	0	5	2016–2026
8	1,202	Matthew Wade	92	68	26.13	0	3	2011–2024
9	1,094	Steve Smith	67	55	24.86	0	5	2010–2024
10	1,038	Tim David†	54	44	32.43	1	5	2022–2025
Last Updated: 30 January 2026

=== Fastest to achieve career runs milestones ===
Runs	Batsman	Innings	Record Date	Ref
1,000	Aaron Finch	29	17 February 2017	
2,000	Aaron Finch	62	4 September 2020	
3,000	Aaron Finch	98	9 October 2022	

=== Most runs in each batting position ===
Batting position	Batsman	Innings	Runs	Average	Span	Ref
Opener	David Warner	103	3,109	34.16	2009–2024	
Number 3	Mitchell Marsh†	40	1,276	37.52	2021–2024	
Number 4	Glenn Maxwell†	61	1,659	33.18	2014–2024	
Number 5	Marcus Stoinis†	38	859	31.81	2018–2026	
Number 6	Tim David†	27	544	28.63	2022–2024	
Number 7	Matthew Wade	35	496	27.55	2011–2024	
Number 8	Pat Cummins†	21	146	13.27	2012–2024	
Number 9	Mitchell Starc	14	53	6.62	2012–2024	
Number 10	Adam Zampa†	20	48	4.00	2016–2026	
Number 11	Josh Hazlewood†	12	29	9.66	2013–2025	
Last Updated: 30 January 2026

=== Most runs against each team ===
Opposition	Runs	Batsman	Matches	Innings	Span	Ref
Afghanistan	113	Glenn Maxwell†	2	2	2022–2024	
Bangladesh	179	Mitchell Marsh†	8	8	2016–2024	
England	619	Aaron Finch	16	16	2011–2022	
India	576	Glenn Maxwell†	24	22	2012–2025	
Ireland	63	Aaron Finch	1	1	2022–2022	
Namibia	34	Travis Head†	1	1	2024–2024	
New Zealand	479	Mitchell Marsh†	13	13	2016–2025	
Oman	67	Marcus Stoinis†	1	1	2024–2024	
Pakistan	397	David Warner	16	16	2010–2021	
Scotland	160	Travis Head†	4	4	2024–2024	
South Africa	471	David Warner	15	15	2009–2021	
Sri Lanka	653	David Warner	17	17	2009–2022	
United Arab Emirates	68	D'Arcy Short	1	1	2018–2018	
West Indies	662	David Warner	15	15	2009–2024	
Zimbabwe	175	Aaron Finch	2	2	2018–2018	
Last updated: 4 October 2025

=== Highest individual score ===
During the third T20I of the 2018 Zimbabwe Tri-Nation Series, Aaron Finch scored 172 runs, the most of any individual in a single innings.

Rank	Runs	Player	Opposition	Venue	Date
1	172 ♠	Aaron Finch	Zimbabwe	Harare Sports Club, Harare, Zimbabwe	3 July 2018
2	156	Aaron Finch	England	Rose Bowl, Southampton, England	29 August 2013
3	145*	Glenn Maxwell	Sri Lanka	Pallekele International Cricket Stadium, Kandy, Sri Lanka	6 September 2016
4	124*	Shane Watson	India	Sydney Cricket Ground, Sydney, Australia	31 January 2016
5	120*	Glenn Maxwell	West Indies	Adelaide Oval, Australia, Australia	11 February 2024
Last Updated: 11 February 2024

=== Highest individual score – progression of record ===
Runs	Player	Opponent	Venue	Season
98*	Ricky Ponting	New Zealand	Eden Park, Auckland, New Zealand	17 February 2005
156	Aaron Finch	England	Rose Bowl, Southampton, England	29 August 2013
172	Aaron Finch	Zimbabwe	Harare Sports Club, Harare, Zimbabwe	3 July 2018
Last Updated: 9 August 2020

=== Highest score against each opponent ===
Opposition	Player	Score	Date
Afghanistan	Glenn Maxwell	54*	4 November 2022
Bangladesh	Matthew Hayden	73*	16 September 2007
England	Aaron Finch	156	29 August 2013
India	Shane Watson	124*	31 January 2016
Ireland	Aaron Finch	63	31 October 2022
Namibia	Travis Head	34*	11 June 2024
New Zealand	Mitchell Marsh	103*	4 October 2025
Oman	Marcus Stoinis	67*	5 June 2024
Pakistan	Shane Watson	81	2 May 2010
Scotland	Josh Inglis	103	6 September 2024
South Africa	Damien Martyn	96	9 January 2006
Sri Lanka	Glenn Maxwell	145*	6 September 2016
United Arab Emirates	D'Arcy Short	68*	22 October 2018
West Indies	Glenn Maxwell	120*	11 February 2024
Zimbabwe	Aaron Finch	172	3 July 2018
Last Updated: 4 October 2025

=== Highest career average ===
A batsman's batting average is the total number of runs they have scored divided by the number of times they have been dismissed.

Rank	Average	Player	Innings	Not Out	Runs	Period
1	37.94	Michael Hussey	30	11	721	2005–2010
2	34.28	Aaron Finch	103	12	3,120	2011–2022
3	33.43	David Warner	110	12	3,277	2009–2024
4	33.26	Mitchell Marsh†	73	13	1,996	2011–2025
5	32.80	Cameron White	44	14	984	2007–2014
Qualification: 20 innings. Last Updated: 4 October 2025

=== Highest average in each batting position ===
Batting position	Batsman	Innings	Runs	Average	Career Span	Ref
Opener	Mitchell Marsh†	12	384	38.40	2024–2025	
Number 3	Mitchell Marsh†	40	1,276	37.52	2021–2024	
Number 4	Glenn Maxwell†	61	1,659	33.18	2014–2024	
Number 5	Marcus Stoinis†	38	859	31.81	2018–2024	
Number 6	Cameron White	14	328	36.44	2009–2014	
Number 7	Matthew Wade	35	496	27.55	2011–2024	
Number 8	Nathan Coulter-Nile	10	107	15.28	2013–2018	
Number 9	Andrew Tye†	10	42	10.50	2016–2021	
Number 10	Adam Zampa†	19	43	3.58	2016–2025	
Number 11	Josh Hazlewood†	12	29	9.66	2013–2024	
Qualification= Minimum 10 Innings batted at position. Last Updated: 4 October 2025

=== Most half-centuries ===
A half-century is a score of between 50 and 99 runs. Statistically, once a batsman's score reaches 100, it is no longer considered a half-century but a century.

Virat Kohli of India has scored most half-centuries in T20Is i.e. 28 fifties. David Warner has scored most 50s for Aussies.

Rank	Half centuries	Player	Innings	Runs	Period
1	28	David Warner	110	3,277	2009–2024
2	19	Aaron Finch	103	3,120	2011–2022
3	12	Glenn Maxwell†	114	2,833	2012–2025
4	11	Mitchell Marsh†	73	1,996	2011–2025
5	10	Shane Watson	56	1,462	2006–2016
Last Updated: 4 October 2025

=== Most centuries ===
A century is a score of 100 or more runs in a single innings.

Rank	Centuries	Player	Innings	Runs	Period
1	5	Glenn Maxwell†	114	2,833	2012–2025
2	2	Josh Inglis†	35	600	2022–2024
2	2	Aaron Finch	103	3,120	2011–2022
3	1	Shane Watson	56	1,462	2006–2016
3	1	David Warner	99	2,894	2009–2022
3	1	Tim David†	56	1,303	2019–2025
3	1	Mitchell Marsh†	73	1,996	2011–2025
Last Updated: 4 October 2025

=== Most sixes ===
Rank	Sixes	Player	Innings	Runs	Period
1	148	Glenn Maxwell†	114	2,833	2012–2025
2	125	Aaron Finch	103	3,120	2011–2022
3	122	David Warner	110	3,277	2009–2024
4	101	Mitchell Marsh†	73	1,996	2011–2025
5	83	Shane Watson	56	1,462	2006–2016
Last Updated: 4 October 2025

=== Most fours ===
Rank	Fours	Player	Innings	Runs	Period
1	337	David Warner	110	3,277	2009–2024
2	309	Aaron Finch	103	3,120	2011–2022
3	240	Glenn Maxwell†	114	2,833	2012–2025
4	171	Mitchell Marsh†	73	1,996	2011–2025
5	125	Travis Head	43	1,163	2016–2025
Last Updated: 4 October 2025

=== Highest strike rates ===
Rank	Strike rate	Player	Runs	Balls Faced	Period
1	174.44	Tim David†	949	544	2022–2025
2	164.41	Josh Inglis†	878	534	2022–2025
3	160.30	Cameron Green†	521	325	2022–2025
4	156.10	Travis Head†	1,163	745	2016–2025
5	156.00	Glenn Maxwell†	2,833	1,816	2012–2025
Qualification= 250 balls faced. Last Updated: 4 October 2025

=== Highest strike rates in an innings ===
Rank	Strike rate	Player	Runs	Balls Faced	Opposition	Venue	Date
1	327.77	Marcus Stoinis	59*	18	Sri Lanka	WACA Ground, Perth, Australia	25 October 2022
2	325.00	Mitchell Marsh	39	12	Scotland	The Grange Club, Edinburgh, Scotland	4 September 2024
3	320.00	Travis Head	80	25	Scotland	The Grange Club, Edinburgh, Scotland	4 September 2024
4	310.00	Tim David	31*	10	New Zealand	Sky Stadium, Wellington, New Zealand	21 February 2024
5	275.67	Tim David	102*	37	West Indies	Warner Park, Basseterre, Saint Kitts and Nevis	25 July 2025
Last Updated: 25 July 2025

=== Most runs in a calendar year ===
Rank	Runs	Player	Matches	Innings	Year
1	627	Mitchell Marsh	21	20	2021
2	539	Travis Head	15	15	2024
3	531	Aaron Finch	17	17	2018
4	515	D'Arcy Short	18	18	2018
5	512	Aaron Finch	20	20	2022
Last Updated: 1 January 2025

=== Most runs in a series ===
Rank	Runs	Player	Matches	Innings	Series
1	306	Aaron Finch	5	5	2018 Zimbabwe Tri-Nation Series
2	289	David Warner	7	7	2021 ICC Men's T20 World Cup
3	265	Matthew Hayden	6	6	2007 ICC World Twenty20
4	255	Travis Head	7	7	2024 ICC Men's T20 World Cup
5	249	Shane Watson	6	6	2012 ICC World Twenty20
Last Updated: 29 June 2025

=== Most ducks ===
Rank	Ducks	Player	Matches	Innings	Period
1	8	Aaron Finch	103	103	2011–2022
2	6	David Warner	110	110	2009–2024
3	5	Glenn Maxwell†	124	114	2012–2025
4	4	6 players			
Last Updated: 26 June 2025

== Bowling records ==
=== Most career wickets ===
A bowler takes the wicket of a batsman when the form of dismissal is bowled, caught, leg before wicket, stumped or hit wicket. If the batsman is dismissed by run out, obstructing the field, handling the ball, hitting the ball twice or timed out the bowler does not receive credit.

Rank	Wickets	Player	Matches	Innings	Period
1	138	Adam Zampa†	109	106	2016–2026
2	79	Josh Hazlewood†	60	59	2013–2025
2	79	Mitchell Starc	65	65	2012–2024
3	66	Pat Cummins†	57	57	2011–2024
4	50	Nathan Ellis†	32	32	2021-2025
5	49	Ashton Agar†	49	49	2016–2024
5	49	Glenn Maxwell†	126	83	2012–2025
5	49	Marcus Stoinis†	82	54	2015-2025
6	48	Shane Watson	58	49	2006-2016
7	47	Andrew Tye	32	31	2016-2021
8	45	Kane Richardson	36	36	2014-2023
9	38	Mitchell Johnson	30	30	2007-2013
10	36	James Faulkner	24	24	2012-2017
Last Updated: 30 January 2026

==== Most wickets against each team ====
Opposition	Wickets	Bowler	Matches	Innings	Career Span	Ref
Afghanistan	4	Adam Zampa†	2	2	2022–2024	
Bangladesh	15	Adam Zampa†	7	7	2016–2024	
England	11	Mitchell Johnson	7	7	2007–2013	
England	11	Josh Hazlewood†	9	9	2013–2024	
India	16	Nathan Ellis†	10	10	2022–2025	
Ireland	4	Mitchell Starc†	2	2	2012–2022	
Namibia	4	Adam Zampa†	1	1	2024–2024	
New Zealand	13	Ashton Agar†	9	9	2016–2021	
New Zealand	13	Adam Zampa†	15	14	2016–2025	
Oman	3	Marcus Stoinis†	1	1	2024–2024	
Pakistan	16	Adam Zampa†	12	12	2016–2026	
Scotland	6	Sean Abbott†	3	3	2024–2024	
Scotland	6	Cameron Green	3	3	2024–2024	
South Africa	13	Pat Cummins†	10	10	2011–2021	
Sri Lanka	21	Adam Zampa†	12	12	2016–2022	
United Arab Emirates	2	Nathan Coulter-Nile†	1	1	2018–2018	
United Arab Emirates	2	Billy Stanlake†	1	1	2018–2018	
West Indies	19	Adam Zampa†	16	16	2021–2025	
Zimbabwe	6	Andrew Tye†	2	2	2018–2018	
Last updated: 30 January 2026

=== Best figures in an innings ===
Bowling figures refers to the number of the wickets a bowler has taken and the number of runs conceded. Ashton Agar holds the Australian record for best bowling figures.

Rank	Figures	Player	Opposition	Venue	Date
1	6/30	Ashton Agar †	New Zealand	Wellington Regional Stadium, Wellington, New Zealand	3 March 2021
2	5/19	Adam Zampa †	Bangladesh	Dubai International Cricket Stadium, Dubai, United Arab Emirates	4 November 2021 ‡
3	5/22	Matthew Short	England	Sophia Gardens, Cardiff, England	13 September 2024
4	5/24	Ashton Agar †	South Africa	New Wanderers Stadium, Johannesburg, South Africa	21 February 2020
5	5/26	Spencer Johnson	Pakistan	Sydney Cricket Ground, Sydney, Australia	16 November 2024
Last Updated: 16 November 2024

=== Best figures in an innings – progression of record ===
Figures	Player	Opposition	Venue	Date
4/29	Michael Kasprowicz	New Zealand	Eden Park, Auckland, New Zealand	17 February 2005
4/20	Stuart Clark	Sri Lanka	Sahara Park Newlands, Cape Town, South Africa	20 September 2007 ‡
4/18	Dirk Nannes	Bangladesh	Kensington Oval, Bridgetown, Barbados	5 May 2010 ‡
4/15	Shane Watson	England	Adelaide Oval, Adelaide, Australia	12 January 2011
5/27	James Faulkner	Pakistan	Punjab Cricket Association Stadium, Mohali, India	25 March 2016 ‡
5/24	Ashton Agar †	South Africa	New Wanderers Stadium, Johannesburg, South Africa	21 February 2020
6/30	Ashton Agar †	New Zealand	Wellington Regional Stadium, Wellington, New Zealand	3 March 2021
Last Updated: 5 March 2021

=== Best bowling figures against each opponent ===
Opposition	Player	Figures	Date
Afghanistan	Pat Cummins	3/28	22 June 2024
Bangladesh	Adam Zampa	5/19	4 November 2021
England	Matthew Short	5/22	13 September 2024
India	Jason Behrendorff	4/21	10 October 2017
Ireland	Shane Watson	3/26	19 September 2012 ‡
New Zealand	Ashton Agar	6/30	3 March 2021
Pakistan	Spencer Johnson	5/26	16 November 2024
South Africa	Ashton Agar	5/24	21 February 2020
Sri Lanka	Josh Hazlewood	4/12	11 February 2022 ‡
United Arab Emirates	Nathan Coulter-Nile	2/20	22 October 2018
United Arab Emirates	Billy Stanlake	2/20	22 October 2018
West Indies	Mitchell Starc	4/20	7 October 2022
Zimbabwe	Andrew Tye	3/12	3 July 2018
Last updated: 16 November 2024.

=== Best career average ===
A bowler's bowling average is the total number of runs they have conceded divided by the number of wickets they have taken.

Rank	Average	Player	Wickets	Runs	Balls	Period
1	17.72	Nathan Ellis†	50	886	676	2021–2025
2	19.00	James Faulkner	36	684	515	2012–2017
3	20.80	Adam Zampa†	138	2,871	2,339	2016–2026
4	20.97	Mitchell Johnson	38	797	656	2007–2013
5	21.21	Andrew Tye	47	997	683	2016–2021
Qualification: 500 balls. Last Updated: 30 January 2026

=== Best career economy rate ===
A bowler's economy rate is the total number of runs they have conceded divided by the number of overs they have bowled.

Rank	Economy rate	Player	Wickets	Runs	Balls	Period
1	6.50	Ashton Agar †	49	1,129	1,042	2016–2024
2	7.28	Mitchell Johnson	38	797	656	2007–2013
3	7.36	Adam Zampa †	138	2,871	2,339	2016–2026
4	7.44	Pat Cummins †	66	1,556	1,254	2011–2024
5	7.47	Josh Hazlewood†	79	1,680	1,348	2013–2025
Qualification: 500 balls. Last Updated: 30 January 2026

=== Best career strike rate ===
A bowler's strike rate is the total number of balls they have bowled divided by the number of wickets they have taken.

Rank	Strike rate	Player	Wickets	Runs	Balls	Period
1	13.50	Nathan Ellis†	50	886	676	2021–2025
2	14.30	James Faulkner	36	684	515	2012–2017
3	14.50	Andrew Tye	47	997	683	2016–2021
4	16.10	Sean Abbott†	33	822	532	2014–2025
5	16.80	Kane Richardson	45	1,059	756	2014–2023
Qualification: 500 balls. Last Updated: 30 January 2026

=== Most four-wickets (& over) hauls in an innings ===
Afghanistan's Rashid Khan has taken the most four-wickets (or over) among all the bowlers. 21 Aussies bowlers have taken at-least one such haul.

Rank	Four-wicket hauls	Player	Innings	Balls	Wickets	Period
1	4	Josh Hazlewood†	59	1,348	79	2013–2025
1	4	Adam Zampa†	106	2,339	138	2016–2026
3	2	Ashton Agar†	49	1,042	49	2016–2024
4	1	18 players				
Last Updated: 30 January 2026

=== Best economy rates in an innings ===
Rank	Economy	Player	Overs	Runs	Wickets	Opposition	Venue	Date
1	2.00	David Hussey	2	4	2	India	Sydney Cricket Ground, Sydney, Australia	1 February 2012
1	2.00	Billy Stanlake	4	8	4	Pakistan	Harare Sports Club, Harare, Zimbabwe	2 July 2018
3	2.50	Adam Voges	2	5	2	India	Melbourne Cricket Ground, Melbourne, Australia	1 February 2008
3	2.50	Cameron Boyce	4	10	2	Pakistan	Dubai International Cricket Stadium, Dubai, UAE	5 October 2014
5	2.75	4 occasions						
Qualification: 12 balls bowled. Last Updated: 7 March 2021

=== Best strike rates in an innings ===
Rank	Strike rate	Player	Wickets	Runs	Balls	Opposition	Venue	Date
1	3.60	Matthew Short	5	22	18	England	Sophia Gardens, Cardiff, England	13 September 2024
2	4.00	Ashton Agar	6	30	24	New Zealand	Wellington Regional Stadium, Wellington, New Zealand	3 March 2021
3	4.80	James Faulkner	5	27	24	Pakistan	Punjab Cricket Association Stadium, Mohali, India	25 March 2016 ‡
3	4.80	Ashton Agar	5	24	24	South Africa	New Wanderers Stadium, Johannesburg, South Africa	21 February 2020
3	4.80	Adam Zampa	5	19	24	Bangladesh	Dubai International Cricket Stadium, Dubai, United Arab Emirates	4 November 2021 ‡
3	4.80	Spencer Johnson	5	26	24	Pakistan	Sydney Cricket Ground, Sydney, Australia	16 November 2024
Qualification: 4 wickets - Last Updated: 16 November 2024

=== Worst figures in an innings ===
Rank	Figures	Player	Overs	Opposition	Venue	Date
1	0/60	Mitchell Starc	4	New Zealand	Dubai International Cricket Stadium, Dubai, UAE	14 November 2021
2	0/59	Kane Richardson †	4	England	Edgbaston Cricket Ground, Birmingham, England	27 June 2018
3	0/56	Sean Abbott	3	India	The Sports Hub, Thiruvananthapuram, India	26 November 2023
4	0/51	Andrew Tye	4	India	Sydney Cricket Ground, Sydney, Australia	31 January 2016
5	0/50	3 players				
Last Updated: 26 November 2023

=== Most wickets in a calendar year ===
Rank	Wickets	Player	Innings	Year
1	35	Adam Zampa	21	2024
2	31	Andrew Tye	18	2018
3	27	Dirk Nannes	14	2010
4	26	Josh Hazlewood†	17	2022
4	26	Adam Zampa	21	2021
Last Updated: 1 January 2025

=== Most wickets in a series ===
2019 ICC World Twenty20 Qualifier at UAE saw records set for the most wickets taken by a bowler in a T20I series when Oman's pacer Bilal Khan tool 18 wickets during the series. Dirk Nannes in the 2010 ICC World Twenty20 took 14 wickets, the most for an Aussie bowler in a series.

Rank	Wickets	Player	Matches	Series
1	14	Dirk Nannes	7	2010 ICC World Twenty20
2	13	Adam Zampa	7	2021 ICC Men's T20 World Cup
2	13	Adam Zampa	7	2024 ICC Men's T20 World Cup
4	12	Stuart Clark	6	2007 ICC World Twenty20
4	12	Andrew Tye	5	2018 Zimbabwe Tri-Nation Series
Last Updated: 29 June 2024

=== Hat-trick ===
In cricket, a hat-trick occurs when a bowler takes three wickets with consecutive deliveries. The deliveries may be interrupted by an over bowled by another bowler from the other end of the pitch or the other team's innings, but must be three consecutive deliveries by the individual bowler in the same match. Only wickets attributed to the bowler count towards a hat-trick; run outs do not count. In T20Is history there have been just 13 hat-tricks, the first achieved by Brett Lee for Australia against Bangladesh in 2007 ICC World Twenty20.

S. No	Bowler	Against	Wickets	Venue	Date	Ref.
1	Brett Lee	Bangladesh	Shakib Al Hasan (c †Adam Gilchrist); Mashrafe Mortaza (b); Alok Kapali (lbw)	(South Africa) Newlands Cricket Ground, Cape Town	16 September 2007 ‡	
2	Ashton Agar	South Africa	Faf du Plessis (c Kane Richardson); Andile Phehlukwayo (lbw); Dale Steyn (c Aaron Finch)	(South Africa) Wanderers Stadium, Johannesburg	21 February 2020	
3	Nathan Ellis	Bangladesh	Mahmudullah (b); Mustafizur Rahman (c Mitchell Marsh); Mahedi Hasan (c Ashton Agar)	(Bangladesh) Sher-e-Bangla National Cricket Stadium, Mirpur	6 August 2021	
4	Pat Cummins	Bangladesh	Mahmudullah (b); Mahedi Hasan (c Adam Zampa); Towhid Hridoy (c Josh Hazlewood)	(Netherlands Antilles) Sir Vivian Richards Stadium, North Sound, Antigua and Barbuda	20 June 2024 ‡	
5	Pat Cummins	Afghanistan	Rashid Khan (c Tim David); Karim Janat (c Tim David); Gulbadin Naib (c Glenn Maxwell)	(Saint Vincent and the Grenadines) Arnos Vale Ground, Kingstown, Saint Vincent and Grenadines	22 June 2024 ‡	
Last Updated: 9 August 2020

== Wicket-keeping records ==
The wicket-keeper is a specialist fielder who stands behind the stumps being guarded by the batsman on strike and is the only member of the fielding side allowed to wear gloves and leg pads.

=== Most career dismissals ===
A wicket-keeper can be credited with the dismissal of a batsman in two ways, caught or stumped. A fair catch is taken when the ball is caught fully within the field of play without it bouncing after the ball has touched the striker's bat or glove holding the bat, Laws 5.6.2.2 and 5.6.2.3 state that the hand or the glove holding the bat shall be regarded as the ball striking or touching the bat while a stumping occurs when the wicket-keeper puts down the wicket while the batsman is out of his ground and not attempting a run. Brad Haddin and Alex Carey is the highest ranked Aussie wicket keeper in the all-time list of taking most dismissals in T20Is as a designated wicket-keeper, which is headed by India's MS Dhoni and West Indian Denesh Ramdin.

Rank	Dismissals	Player	Matches	Innings	Period
1	64	Matthew Wade	92	88	2011–2024
2	23	Alex Carey†	38	29	2018–2021
2	23	Brad Haddin	34	31	2006–2014
4	17	Adam Gilchrist	13	13	2005–2008
5	12	Tim Paine	10	10	2009–2017
Last updated: 29 October 2024

=== Most career catches ===
Haddin and Adam Gilchrist have taken the most catches in T20Is as a designated wicket-keeper with Dhoni and Ramdin leading the all-time list.

Rank	Catches	Player	Matches	Innings	Period
1	48	Matthew Wade	92	88	2011–2024
2	17	Adam Gilchrist	13	13	2005–2008
2	17	Brad Haddin	34	31	2006–2014
4	14	Alex Carey †	38	29	2018–2021
5	10	Tim Paine	10	10	2009–2017
Last Updated: 29 October 2024

=== Most career stumpings ===
Carey has made the most stumpings in T20Is as a designated wicket-keeper among Aussies with Dhoni and Kamran Akmal of Pakistan heading this all-time list.

Rank	Stumpings	Player	Matches	Innings	Period
1	9	Alex Carey†	38	29	2018–2021
2	6	Brad Haddin	34	31	2006–2014
2	6	Matthew Wade	92	88	2011–2024
4	2	Tim Paine	10	10	2009–2017
4	2	Ben Dunk	5	3	2014-2014
Last Updated: 29 October 2024

=== Most dismissals in an innings ===
Four wicket-keepers on four occasions have taken five dismissals in a single innings in a T20I.

The feat of taking 4 dismissals in an innings has been achieved by 19 wicket-keepers on 26 occasions with Gilchrist being the only Australian wicket-keeper.

Rank	Dismissals	Player	Opposition	Venue	Date
1	4	Adam Gilchrist	Zimbabwe	Sahara Park Newlands, Cape Town, South Africa	12 September 2007
1	4	Adam Gilchrist	New Zealand	WACA Ground, Perth, Australia	11 December 2007
3	3	Brad Haddin	New Zealand	Westpac Stadium, Wellington, New Zealand	26 February 2010
3	3	Matthew Wade †	South Africa	Ranasinghe Premadasa Stadium, Colombo, Sri Lanka	30 September 2012
3	3	Ben Dunk	South Africa	Melbourne Cricket Ground, Melbourne, Australia	7 November 2014
3	3	Tim Paine	Sri Lanka	Kardinia Park, Geelong, Australia	19 February 2017
3	3	Tim Paine	India	Dr. Bhupen Hazarika Cricket Stadium, Guwahati, India	10 October 2017
3	3	Alex Carey †	Sri Lanka	The Gabba, Brisbane, Australia	30 October 2019
Last Updated: 9 August 2020

=== Most dismissals in a series ===
Netherlands wicket-keeper Scott Edwards holds the T20Is record for the most dismissals taken by a wicket-keeper in a series. He made 13 dismissals during the 2019 ICC World Twenty20 Qualifier. Australian record is held by Gilchrist when he made 9 dismissals during the 2007 ICC World Twenty20.

Rank	Dismissals	Player	Matches	Innings	Series
1	9	Adam Gilchrist	6	6	2007 ICC World Twenty20
2	8	Matthew Wade	6	6	2021 ICC Men's T20 World Cup
3	6	Ben Dunk	3	3	South Africa in Australia in 2014-15
3	6	Alex Carey †	5	5	2018 Zimbabwe Tri-Nation Series
5	5	Brad Haddin	7	7	2010 ICC World Twenty20
5	5	Matthew Wade †	6	6	2012 ICC World Twenty20
5	5	Tim Paine	3	3	Sri Lanka in Australia in 2016-17
5	5	Alex Carey †	5	5	2017–18 Trans-Tasman Tri-Series
5	5	Alex Carey †	3	3	Sri Lanka in Australia in 2019-20
Last Updated: 11 November 2021

== Fielding records ==
=== Most career catches ===
Caught is one of the nine methods a batsman can be dismissed in cricket. (Note: In 2017, The Laws of Cricket were amended, reducing the methods of dismissals from ten to nine, with handled the ball now covered as part of obstructing the field.) The majority of catches are caught in the slips, located behind the batsman, next to the wicket-keeper, on the off side of the field. Most slip fielders are top order batsmen.

South Africa's David Miller holds the record for the most catches in T20Is by a non-wicket-keeper with 69, followed by New Zealand's Martin Guptill on 62 and Shoaib Malik of Pakistan with 50. David Warner is the leading catcher for Australia.

Rank	Catches	Player	Matches	Innings	Ct/Inn	Period
1	62	David Warner	110	110	0.563	2009–2024
2	52	Glenn Maxwell†	113	112	0.464	2012–2024
3	50	Aaron Finch	103	102	0.490	2011–2022
4	41	Steve Smith†	67	67	0.611	2010–2024
5	32	Ashton Agar†	49	49	0.653	2016–2024
Last Updated: 26 June 2024

=== Most catches in an innings ===
The feat of taking 4 catches in an innings has been achieved by 14 fielders on 14 occasions. No Australian fielder has achieved this feat. The most is three catches on nine occasions.

Rank	Dismissals	Player	Opposition	Venue	Date
1	3	Brett Lee	Sri Lanka	Sahara Park Newlands, Cape Town, South Africa	20 September 2007
1	3	Michael Hussey	Bangladesh	Kensington Oval, Bridgetown, Barbados	5 May 2010
1	3	David Warner	Pakistan	Darren Sammy National Cricket Stadium, Gros Islet, Saint Lucia	14 May 2010
1	3	Ben Cutting	England	Sydney Cricket Ground, Sydney, Australia	2 February 2014
1	3	David Warner	Sri Lanka	Ranasinghe Premadasa Stadium, Colombo, Sri Lanka	9 September 2016
1	3	Aaron Finch	Pakistan	Harare Sports Club, Harare, Zimbabwe	2 July 2018
1	3	Jason Behrendorff	India	The Gabba, Brisbane, Australia	21 November 2018
1	3	Ben McDermott	Sri Lanka	Melbourne Cricket Ground, Melbourne, Australia	1 November 2019
1	3	Steven Smith	Pakistan	Sydney Cricket Ground, Sydney, Australia	3 November 2019
1	3	Ashton Agar	Bangladesh	Sher-e-Bangla National Cricket Stadium, Mirpur, Bangladesh	9 August 2021
Last Updated: 9 August 2021

=== Most catches in a series ===
The 2019 ICC Men's T20 World Cup Qualifier, which saw Netherlands retain their title, saw the record set for the most catches taken by a non-wicket-keeper in a T20I series. Jersey's Ben Stevens and Namibia's JJ Smit took 10 catches in the series. David Warner and Michael Hussey with 8 catches in the 2010 ICC World Twenty20 are the leading Aussie fielder on this list.

Rank	Catches	Player	Matches	Innings	Series
1	8	David Warner	7	7	2010 ICC World Twenty20
1	8	Michael Hussey	7	7	2010 ICC World Twenty20
1	8	Steven Smith	7	7	2021 ICC Men's T20 World Cup
4	7	David Warner	5	5	2017–18 Trans-Tasman Tri-Series
5	6	David Hussey	7	7	2010 ICC World Twenty20
5	6	Steven Smith	7	7	2010 ICC World Twenty20
5	6	Glenn Maxwell	4	4	2014 ICC World Twenty20
Last Updated: 11 November 2021

== Other records ==
=== Most career matches ===
Pakistan's Shoaib Malik holds the record for the most T20I matches played with 122, followed by his teammate Mohammad Hafeez with 119 and Rohit Sharma of India with 116 games. Glenn Maxwell has played the most matches for Australia, having played 130 matches over his career.

Rank	Matches	Player	Runs	Wkts	Period
1	130	Glenn Maxwell†	2,897	43	2012–2026
2	115	Adam Zampa†	80	147	2016–2026
3	110	David Warner	3,277	-	2009–2024
4	103	Aaron Finch	3,120	0	2011–2022
5	92	Matthew Wade	1,202	-	2011–2024
Last Updated: 12 March 2026

=== Most consecutive career matches ===
Scotland's Richie Berrington hold the record for the most consecutive T20I matches played with 70. David Warner holds the Aussie record.

Rank	Matches	Player	Period
1	39	David Warner	2009-2013
2	38	David Hussey	2008-2012
3	32	Aaron Finch	2018-2020
4	28	George Bailey	2012-2014
5	25	Glenn Maxwell	2017-2019
Last updated: 11 November 2021

=== Most matches as captain ===
MS Dhoni, who led the Indian cricket team from 2007 to 2016, holds the record for the most matches played as captain in T20Is with 72. Aaron Finch has led Australia in most matches for any player from his country.

Rank	Matches	Player	Won	Lost	Tied	NR	Win %	Period
1	76	Aaron Finch	40	32	1	3	55.47	2014–2022
2	28	George Bailey	14	13	1	0	51.78	2012–2014
3	18	Michael Clarke	12	4	1	1	73.52	2007–2010
4	17	Ricky Ponting	7	10	0	0	41.17	2005–2009
5	16	Mitchell Marsh†	13	3	0	0	81.25	2023–2024
Last Updated: 5 September 2024

=== Most matches won as a captain ===
Rank	Won	Player	Matches	Lost	Tied	NR	Win %	Period
1	40	Aaron Finch	76	32	1	3	55.47	2014–2022
2	14	George Bailey	28	13	1	0	51.79	2012–2014
3	13	Mitchell Marsh†	16	3	0	0	81.25	2023–2024
4	12	Michael Clarke	18	4	1	1	73.53	2007–2010
5	8	David Warner	9	1	0	0	88.89	2016–2018
Last Updated: 5 September 2024

==== Most man of the match awards ====
Rank	M.O.M	Player	Matches	Period
1	12	David Warner	110	2009–2024
2	9	Shane Watson	58	2006–2016
2	9	Glenn Maxwell†	113	2012–2024
4	8	Adam Zampa†	87	2016–2024
4	8	Aaron Finch	103	2011–2022
Last Updated: 26 June 2024

==== Most man of the series awards ====
Rank	M.O.S	Player	Matches	Period
1	5	David Warner	110	2009–2024
2	4	Glenn Maxwell†	113	2015–2024
3	2	Aaron Finch	103	2011–2022
4	1	James Faulkner	24	2012–2017
4	1	Shane Watson	58	2006–2016
4	1	Mitchell Marsh†	61	2011–2024
4	1	Steve Smith†	67	2010–2023
Last Updated: 26 June 2024

=== Youngest players on Debut ===
The youngest player to play in a T20I match is Marian Gherasim at the age of 14 years and 16 days. Making his debut for Romania against the Bulgaria on 16 October 2020 in the first T20I of the 2020 Balkan Cup thus becoming the youngest to play in a men's T20I match.

Rank	Age	Player	Opposition	Venue	Date
1	18 years and 158 days	Pat Cummins	South Africa	Sahara Park Newlands, Cape Town, South Africa	13 October 2011
2	19 years and 361 days	Mitchell Marsh	South Africa	New Wanderers Stadium, Johannesburg, South Africa	16 October 2011
3	20 years and 152 days	Jhye Richardson	Sri Lanka	Kardinia Park, Geelong, Australia	19 February 2017
4	20 years and 183 days	James Muirhead	England	Bellerive Oval, Hobart, Australia	29 January 2014
5	20 years and 248 days	Steven Smith	Pakistan	Melbourne Cricket Ground, Melbourne, Australia	5 February 2010
Last Updated: 9 August 2020

=== Oldest Players on Debut ===
The Turkish batsmen Osman Göker is the oldest player to make their debut a T20I match. Playing in the 2019 Continental Cup against Romania at Moara Vlasiei Cricket Ground, Moara Vlăsiei he was aged 59 years and 181 days.

Rank	Age	Player	Opposition	Venue	Date
1	36 years and 228 days	Michael Klinger	Sri Lanka	Melbourne Cricket Ground, Melbourne, Australia	17 February 2017
2	35 years and 18 days	Brad Hogg	South Africa	New Wanderers Stadium, Johannesburg, South Africa	24 February 2006
3	35 years and 8 days	Glenn McGrath	New Zealand	Eden Park, Auckland, New Zealand	17 February 2005
4	33 years and 227 days	Matthew Hayden	England	Rose Bowl, Southampton, England	13 June 2005
5	33 years and 119 days	Damien Martyn	New Zealand	Eden Park, Auckland, New Zealand	17 February 2005
Last Updated: 9 August 2020

=== Oldest Players ===
The Turkish batsmen Osman Göker is the oldest player to appear in a T20I match during the same above mentioned match.

Rank	Age	Player	Opposition	Venue	Date
1	43 years and 45 days	Brad Hogg	Pakistan	Sher-e-Bangla National Cricket Stadium, Mirpur, Bangladesh	23 March 2014
2	39 years and 91 days	Brad Hodge	India	Sher-e-Bangla National Cricket Stadium, Mirpur, Bangladesh	30 March 2014
3	38 years and 97 days	Daniel Christian	Bangladesh	Sher-e-Bangla National Cricket Stadium, Mirpur, Bangladesh	9 August 2021
4	37 years and 241 days	David Warner	India	Daren Sammy Cricket Ground, Gros Islet, West Indies	24 June 2024
5	37 years and 131 days	Michael Hussey	West Indies	Ranasinghe Premadasa Stadium, Colombo, Sri Lanka	5 October 2012
Last Updated: 24 June 2024

== Partnership records ==
In cricket, two batsmen are always present at the crease batting together in a partnership. This partnership will continue until one of them is dismissed, retires or the innings comes to a close.

=== Highest partnerships by wicket ===
A wicket partnership describes the number of runs scored before each wicket falls. The first wicket partnership is between the opening batsmen and continues until the first wicket falls. The second wicket partnership then commences between the not out batsman and the number three batsman. This partnership continues until the second wicket falls. The third wicket partnership then commences between the not out batsman and the new batsman. This continues down to the tenth wicket partnership. When the tenth wicket has fallen, there is no batsman left to partner so the innings is closed.

Wicket	Runs	First batsman	Second batsman	Opposition	Venue	Date
1st Wicket	223	Aaron Finch	D'Arcy Short	Zimbabwe	Harare Sports Club, Harare, Zimbabwe	3 July 2018
2nd Wicket	130	Steven Smith	Josh Inglis	India	Dr. Y. S. Rajashekar Reddy ACA–VDCA Cricket Stadium, Vishakhapatnam, India	23 November 2023
3rd Wicket	131*	Josh Inglis	Cameron Green	West Indies	Sabina Park, Kingston, Jamaica	22 July 2025
4th Wicket	161 ♠	David Warner	Glenn Maxwell	South Africa	New Wanderers Stadium, Johannesburg, South Africa	6 March 2016
5th Wicket	97	Mitchell Marsh	Tim David	South Africa	Kingsmead, Durban, South Africa	30 August 2023
6th Wicket	101* ♠	Cameron White	Michael Hussey	Sri Lanka	Kensington Oval, Bridgetown, Barbados	9 May 2010
7th Wicket	92 ♠	Marcus Stoinis	Daniel Sams	New Zealand	University Oval, Dunedin, New Zealand	25 February 2021
8th Wicket	53*	Mitchell Johnson	Michael Hussey	Pakistan	Darren Sammy National Cricket Stadium, Gros Islet, Saint Lucia	14 May 2010
9th Wicket	23*	Clinton McKay	Nathan Coulter-Nile	West Indies	The Gabba, Brisbane, Australia	13 February 2013
10th Wicket	36*	Matthew Wade	Tanveer Sangha	India	Greenfield International Stadium, Thiruvananthapuram, India	26 November 2023
Last Updated: 26 November 2023

=== Highest partnerships by runs ===
The highest T20I partnership by runs for any wicket is held by the Afghan pairing of Hazratullah Zazai and Usman Ghani who put together an opening wicket partnership of 236 runs during the Ireland v Afghanistan series in India in 2019

Wicket	Runs	First batsman	Second batsman	Opposition	Venue	Date
1st Wicket	223	Aaron Finch	D'Arcy Short	Zimbabwe	Harare Sports Club, Harare, Zimbabwe	3 July 2018
4th Wicket	161	David Warner	Glenn Maxwell	South Africa	New Wanderers Stadium, Johannesburg, South Africa	6 March 2016
1st Wicket	134*	David Warner	Aaron Finch	Sri Lanka	Ranasinghe Premadasa Stadium, Colombo, Sri Lanka	7 June 2022
1st Wicket	133	David Warner	Shane Watson	India	Ranasinghe Premadasa Stadium, Colombo, Sri Lanka	28 September 2012
2nd Wicket	131*	Josh Inglis	Cameron Green	India	Sabina Park, Kingston, Jamaica	22 July 2025
Last Updated: 23 November 2023

=== Highest overall partnership runs by a pair ===
Rank	Runs	Innings	Players	Highest	Average	100/50	T20I career span
1	1,583	44	Aaron Finch & David Warner	134*	38.6	4/6	2012–2022
2	1,154	37	David Warner & Shane Watson	133	31.18	3/6	2009–2016
3	664	18	Mitchell Marsh & David Warner	124	36.88	1/4	2016–2024
5	626	22	Glenn Maxwell & David Warner	161	32.94	2/2	2012–2024
5	614	16	Aaron Finch & D'Arcy Short	223	40.93	1/3	2018–2020
An asterisk (*) signifies an unbroken partnership (i.e. neither of the batsmen was dismissed before either the end of the allotted overs or the required score being reached). Last updated: 26 June 2024

== Umpiring records ==
=== Most matches umpired ===
An umpire in cricket is a person who officiates the match according to the Laws of Cricket. Two umpires adjudicate the match on the field, whilst a third umpire has access to video replays, and a fourth umpire looks after the match balls and other duties. The records below are only for on-field umpires.

Ahsan Raza of Pakistan holds the record for the most T20I matches umpired with 49. The most experienced Australian umpire is Rod Tucker with 35 matches officiated so far.

Rank	Matches	Umpire	Period
1	37	Rod Tucker	2009–2020
2	34	Simon Taufel	2007–2012
3	26	Steve Davis	2007–2014
4	20	Bruce Oxenford	2006–2016
5	19	Simon Fry	2011–2019
Last Updated: 22 February 2021

== See also ==
- List of Australia Test cricket records
- List of Australia One Day International cricket records
