= Scott Henry =

Scott Henry may refer to:

- Scott Henry (cricketer) (born 1989), Australian cricketer
- Scott Henry (golfer) (born 1987), Scottish golfer
- Scott Henry (vine training system)
