= Australian cricket team in South Africa in 2015–16 =

International cricket tour

	South Africa	Australia
- Dates: 4 March 2016 – 9 March 2016
Captains	Faf du Plessis	Steve Smith

Twenty20 International series
- Results: Australia won the 3-match series 2–1
Most runs	Faf du Plessis (123)	David Warner (130)
Most wickets	Kagiso Rabada (5); Imran Tahir (5)	Nathan Coulter-Nile (5)
- Player of the series: David Warner (Aus)

The Australian cricket team toured South Africa from 4 to 9 March 2016 to play three Twenty20 International matches. The matches were in preparation for the 2016 ICC World Twenty20 which started later that month in India. Australia won the series 2–1.

== Squads ==
T20Is
South Africa	Australia
Faf du Plessis (c); Kyle Abbott; Hashim Amla; Farhaan Behardien; Quinton de Kock; AB de Villiers; Jean-Paul Duminy; Imran Tahir; David Miller; Chris Morris; Aaron Phangiso; Kagiso Rabada; Rilee Rossouw; Dale Steyn; David Wiese	Steve Smith (c); David Warner; Ashton Agar; Nathan Coulter-Nile; James Faulkner; Aaron Finch; John Hastings; Josh Hazlewood; Usman Khawaja; Mitchell Marsh; Glenn Maxwell; Peter Nevill; Andrew Tye; Shane Watson; Adam Zampa

== T20I series ==
=== 1st T20I ===
4 March
18:00 (D/N)
Scorecard

Australia; 157/9 (20 overs)	v	South Africa; 158/7 (19.2 overs)
Aaron Finch 40 (18); Imran Tahir 3/21 (4 overs)		David Miller 53* (35); Nathan Coulter-Nile 3/29 (4 overs)

South Africa won by 3 wickets
Kingsmead Cricket Ground, Durban
Umpires: Shaun George (SA) and Adrian Holdstock (SA)
Player of the match: David Miller (SA)

- Australia won the toss and elected to bat.
- Peter Nevill and Adam Zampa (both Australia) made their T20I debuts.

=== 2nd T20I ===
6 March
14:30
Scorecard

South Africa; 204/7 (20 overs)	v	Australia; 205/5 (20 overs)
Faf du Plessis 79 (41); James Faulkner 3/28 (4 overs)		David Warner 77 (40); Kagiso Rabada 2/25 (4 overs)

Australia won by 5 wickets
Wanderers Stadium, Johannesburg
Umpires: Shaun George (SA) and Adrian Holdstock (SA)
Player of the match: David Warner (Aus)

- Australia won the toss and elected to field.
- Ashton Agar (Aus) made his T20I debut.
- This was Australia's highest successful run-chase in T20Is.
- The partnership of 161 between Warner and Glenn Maxwell was the highest 4th wicket partnership in T20Is.

=== 3rd T20I ===
9 March
18:00 (D/N)
Scorecard

South Africa; 178/4 (20 overs)	v	Australia; 181/4 (19.2 overs)
Hashim Amla 97* (62); Nathan Coulter-Nile 2/36 (4 overs)		Steve Smith 44 (26); Imran Tahir 2/38 (4 overs)

Australia won by 6 wickets
Newlands Cricket Ground, Cape Town
Umpires: Shaun George (SA) and Adrian Holdstock (SA)
Player of the match: Hashim Amla (SA)

- South Africa won the toss and elected to bat.
