= Ashton Agar =

Australian cricketer (born 1993)

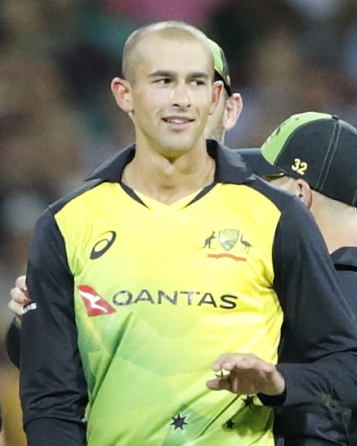
- Agar in 2018

Personal information
- Full name: Ashton Charles Agar
- Born: 14 October 1993 (age 33); Melbourne, Victoria, Australia
- Nickname: Larry
- Height: 189 cm (6 ft 2 in)
- Batting: Left-handed
- Bowling: Slow left-arm orthodox
- Role: Bowler
- Relatives: Wes Agar (brother)

International information
- National side: Australia (2013–2024)
- Test debut (cap 434): 10 July 2013 v England
- Last Test: 4 January 2023 v South Africa
- ODI debut (cap 208): 8 September 2015 v England
- Last ODI: 7 September 2023 v South Africa
- ODI shirt no.: 46
- T20I debut (cap 83): 6 March 2016 v South Africa
- Last T20I: 22 June 2024 v Afghanistan
- T20I shirt no.: 46

Domestic team information
- Years: Team
- 2012/13–present: Western Australia
- 2013/14–present: Perth Scorchers
- 2018: Middlesex
- 2019: Warwickshire
- 2024: Northamptonshire

Career statistics
Competition	Test	ODI	T20I	FC
Matches	5	22	49	67
Runs scored	195	322	279	2,412
Batting average	32.50	24.76	11.62	28.37
100s/50s	0/1	0/0	0/0	3/13
Top score	98	48*	29	114*
Balls bowled	1006	1098	1042	13,394
Wickets	9	21	49	165
Bowling average	52.00	45.61	23.04	40.76
5 wickets in innings	0	0	2	6
10 wickets in match	0	0	0	2
Best bowling	3/46	2/31	6/30	6/110
Catches/stumpings	0/–	10/–	32/–	24/–
Medal record
Men's Cricket
Representing Australia
T20 World Cup
Winner	2021 UAE & Oman
- Source: ESPNcricinfo, 8 October 2024

Ashton Charles Agar (born 14 October 1993) is an Australian cricketer who has played all forms of the game at international level. Agar plays domestically for Western Australia and the Perth Scorchers. A left-handed spin bowler and capable lower-order batsman (he has made three first-class centuries), he played two Test matches for the Australian national team during the 2013 Ashes series and 5 Test matches in his career. Agar was also a member of the Australian team that won the 2021 Men's T20 World Cup in the United Arab Emirates and Oman.

== Early life and career ==
Agar was born in Melbourne, to Sonia Hewawissa, a Sri Lankan mother and John Agar, an Australian father, and has two younger brothers, Will and Wes, the latter of whom has also played international cricket for Australia. Agar began playing cricket at the age of six, playing for McKinnon Cricket Club, a local club based in Bentleigh East, the same club that his father also played for. Agar attended Melbourne's De La Salle College, graduating in 2011. De La Salle College's cricket team played their matches on Wednesdays, which allowed Agar to begin playing grade cricket for Richmond Cricket Club on weekends. Agar made his first grade debut for Richmond in Victorian Premier Cricket as a fifteen-year-old, playing against adult men.

Agar represented Victoria at both under-17 and under-19 level. After good form at the 2010–11 National Under-17 Championships, where he took 16 wickets at an average of 11.75 bowling left-arm orthodox spin, he was selected to play for the Australian under-19s for a series against the West Indies under-19s in the United Arab Emirates. Making his debut at the age of 17, Agar went on to play one under-19 Test and ten under-19 One Day International (ODI) matches for Australia. At the 2012 Under-19 World Cup, he was named in the squad as Australia's second spinner behind Ashton Turner, but did not play a match at the tournament.

Despite an unsuccessful 2011/12 season in grade cricket, being dropped to second XI level for four matches, Agar was offered contracts by two state teams: his home state of Victoria, and Western Australia, who were looking to increase their spin bowling depth. Agar chose to move to Western Australia. In Western Australian Premier Cricket, Agar played for University.

== 2013: Breakout year and Ashes debut ==
Agar made his first appearances at senior level for Western Australia in January 2013, replacing the injured Michael Beer as the team's spinner. He made his first-class debut in a Sheffield Shield match against New South Wales and his List A debut in a Ryobi One-Day Cup match the same week. In his second Shield match, early the following month, he scored 53 runs in Western Australia's second innings, putting on a state Sheffield Shield record partnership of 94 runs for the tenth wicket with Michael Hogan (43 not out).

After his performances in these early matches, Agar was added to the Australian squad for their 2012–13 tour of India in a development capacity, only intended to play in Australia's first two-day warm-up match then return to Australia before the full squad arrived ahead of the Test series. His stay was subsequently extended to include a three-day practice match against India A, playing as Australia's third spin bowler behind Xavier Doherty and Nathan Lyon. During this tour, Agar was named as one of six Australian players to join Hampshire's academy for the 2013 English summer, where he would train at the Rose Bowl and play league cricket in the south of England.

After the two tour matches in India, Agar returned to play for Western Australia and finished the Sheffield Shield season with 19 wickets from five matches at a bowling average of 28.42, including a five-wicket haul, 5/65, taken against South Australia in early March. In the same match, Agar was again involved in a substantial last-wicket partnership with Michael Hogan, with the pair adding 68 to enable Western Australia to win by one wicket. In his previous match, against Tasmania, he had scored 71 not out in Western Australia's fourth innings of 8/351, helping the team win by two wickets, and he finished the season with 229 runs at an average of 32.71, finishing third in the team's batting averages.

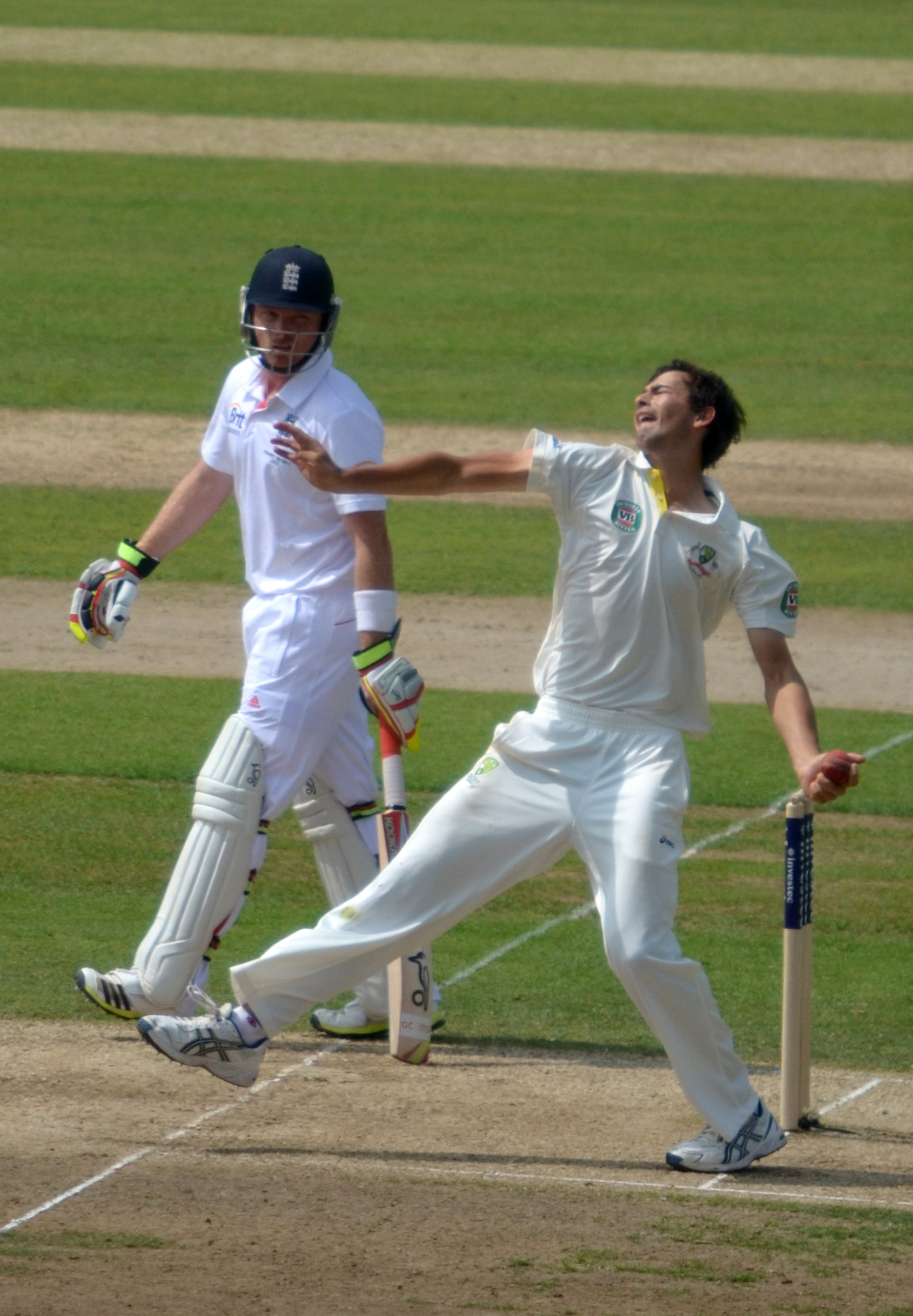
Agar bowling in 2013

Agar was selected to tour England, Scotland, and Ireland with Australia A in June 2013 alongside fellow spin bowler Fawad Ahmed. Though both Agar and Ahmed were also named in the Australia A squad set to tour Africa at the same time as the Ashes series, national selector John Inverarity said that the Ashes squad could be expanded to include one of the two spinners alongside Nathan Lyon. Agar was added to the Ashes squad following the appointment of Darren Lehmann as Australia's new coach.

Agar was named to make his Test debut in the first Test of the series (played at Trent Bridge, Nottingham), replacing Lyon in the team from the previous tour. Aged 19 years and 269 days, he became the twelfth-youngest Australian Test player. Australia bowled first, but Agar did not take a wicket in the first innings as England scored a total of 215 runs. In the second innings, Agar came in to bat as Australia's final batsman when the team had fallen to 9/117. He went on to score 98 runs from 101 balls, breaking several Test records, including highest score by a number eleven batsman and, with Phillip Hughes, highest partnership for the tenth wicket (163 runs). When on 98, Agar attempted a pull shot to bring up a century, which would have been the first time a number eleven batsman had scored 100 runs in Test cricket, but the ball was caught by England fielder Graeme Swann in the outfield and Agar's innings came to an end.

In the third innings, Agar took his first Test wicket, dismissing England's captain Alastair Cook for 50 runs. He took a second wicket, that of Jonny Bairstow, and appealed for a third when Stuart Broad was caught behind the wicket by a slip fielder. Umpire Aleem Dar gave a decision of not out, believing that Broad had not hit the ball, and Australia were not able to use the Decision Review System to challenge the decision because they had already made two unsuccessful reviews earlier in the innings. Replays later showed that the ball had deflected off of Broad's bat before being caught. Agar moved up the batting order to number eight in the final innings and scored another 14 runs, but Australia went on to lose the match by 14 runs, going down 0–1 in the series.

Agar played again in the second Test match of the series at Lord's Cricket Ground, but he experienced hip pain which restricted his movement and his ability to bowl. Australian batter Steve Smith bowled spin for the team in his place and he underwent scans after the first day's play. Agar played out the rest of the match, but his bowling was unimpressive and he failed to take any wickets. After the two matches he had only taken two wickets at a bowling average of 124. Agar was subsequently dropped from the team for the third and fourth Tests and Lyon replaced him in the team. He returned home due from the tour early to illness ahead of the final Test.

== Later career ==
Agar made his Twenty20 debut for the Perth Scorchers in the 2013 Champions League Twenty20 in India. He was used primarily as an opening batsman at the tournament, bowling only 4.2 overs across three matches (from which he conceded 51 runs without taking a wicket). Against the Mumbai Indians, he scored 35 from 40 balls, which was his highest score in Twenty20s at the time.

Agar played only a single match during the 2013–14 Big Bash League season, but the following season featured in eight of the Scorchers' ten matches. He took eight wickets at an average of 24.25, ranked thirteenth in the competition and fourth for the Scorchers, behind Jason Behrendorff, Yasir Arafat, and Andrew Tye. Only two spinners – Cameron Boyce (10) and Adam Zampa (9) – took more wickets at the tournament. When the 2014–15 Sheffield Shield season resumed after the conclusion of the Big Bash League, Agar was man of the match against South Australia, taking an inaugural ten-wicket haul (5/133 and 5/81) and also scoring 64 in Western Australia's first innings. In the next match, against New South Wales, he took 4/22 in the second innings, helping to bowl New South Wales out for 97.

During India's 2014–15 tour of Australia, he was added to Australia's squad for the Fourth Test, a dead rubber on a spin-friendly pitch at the Sydney Cricket Ground, but he did not play in the match, with Lyon preferred as Australia's sole spinner.

In 2015, Agar was not granted a spot for The Ashes squad, instead becoming a fixture in the List A squad. He would make his limited-overs debut following the Ashes series.

He made his One Day International debut against England on 8 September 2015. He made his Twenty20 International debut for Australia against South Africa on 6 March 2016.

In 2017, Agar was recalled to the Australian test team for their tour of Bangladesh, and in the first test match, took 5 wickets in total, as well as scoring an impressive 41 not out in Australia's first innings. Despite his efforts, Australia lost to Bangladesh for the first time in Test cricket.

In April 2018, he was awarded a national contract by Cricket Australia for the 2018–19 season.

On 21 February 2020, in the first T20I match against South Africa, Agar became the second bowler for Australia, and 13th overall, to take a hat-trick in a T20I match. He finished the match with figures of 5/24 from his four overs, his first five-wicket haul in a T20I match.

In April 2020, Cricket Australia awarded Agar with a central contract ahead of the 2020–21 season. On 16 July 2020, Agar was named in a 26-man preliminary squad of players to begin training ahead of a possible tour to England following the COVID-19 pandemic. On 14 August 2020, Cricket Australia confirmed that the fixtures would be taking place, with Agar included in the touring party.

On 3 March 2021, during the series against New Zealand, Agar took the best figures for a bowler for Australia, and the fifth-best figures overall in T20Is, with 6/30 from his four overs. In August 2021, Agar was named in Australia's squad for the 2021 ICC Men's T20 World Cup.

In March 2022, Agar was added to the Australian test, ODI, and T20 squad ahead of its tour of Pakistan. However, Agar was withdrawn from the T20 squad after testing positive for coronavirus.

To provide spin depth to the Australian test squad during its series against South Africa, Agar was added for the fifth and final test match in Sydney. He was named in the Australian test XI for the first time in five years, as an all-rounder option following Cameron Green's dislocated finger injury.

In May 2024, he was named in Australia's squad for the 2024 ICC Men's T20 World Cup tournament.

In January 2025, 31-year old Agar signed a three-year contract extension with Perth Scorchers until the end of the KFC BBL|17 season. He is one of the Scorchers longest-serving players, with a 12-year career with the club, having been called up for his Scorchers debut as a 20-year-old in BBL|03.
