= Michael Philipson =

Australian cricket player

Personal information
- Full name: Michael Anthony Philipson
- Born: 9 May 1986 (age 40)
- Batting: Right-handed
- Bowling: Right-arm offbreak
- Role: All-rounder

Domestic team information
- Years: Team
- 2014-15: Queensland
- Source: Cricinfo, 8 January 2019

Michael Anthony Philipson (born 9 May 1986) is an Australian cricketer. He has previously represented Queensland in the Sheffield Shield.
