= 2007–08 Chappell–Hadlee Trophy =

Chappell–Hadlee Trophy 2007–08
	Australia	New Zealand
- Dates: 7 December – 20 December 2007
Captains	Ricky Ponting	Daniel Vettori

One Day International series
- Results: Australia won the 3-match series 2–0
Most runs	Ricky Ponting (241)	Brendon McCullum (107)
Most wickets	Brett Lee (7)	Kyle Mills (3)
- Player of the series: Ricky Ponting

Twenty20 International series
- Results: Australia won the 1-match series 1–0
Most runs	Andrew Symonds (85)	Jacob Oram (66)
Most wickets	Ashley Noffke (3)	Mark Gillespie (2)
- Player of the series: Andrew Symonds

The New Zealand cricket team toured Australia from 7 to 20 December 2007. Three ODIs from 14 to 20 December were played. The series also included a Twenty20 match to be played on 11 December and a tour match featuring Cricket Australia Chairman's XI on 7 December.

== Squads ==
ODI squads		Twenty20 squads
Australia	New Zealand	Australia	New Zealand
Ricky Ponting (c)	Daniel Vettori (c)	Michael Clarke (c)	Daniel Vettori (c)
Adam Gilchrist (wk)	Brendon McCullum (wk)	Adam Gilchrist (wk)	Brendon McCullum (wk)
Matthew Hayden	Craig Cumming	Nathan Bracken	Craig Cumming
Michael Clarke	Mark Gillespie	Stuart Clark	Mark Gillespie
Andrew Symonds	Gareth Hopkins	Brad Hodge	Gareth Hopkins
Michael Hussey	Jamie How	Michael Hussey	Jamie How
Brad Haddin	Chris Martin	Mitchell Johnson	Chris Martin
James Hopes	Michael Mason	Brett Lee	Michael Mason
Brad Hogg	Kyle Mills	Ashley Noffke	Kyle Mills
Brett Lee	Jacob Oram	Andrew Symonds	Jacob Oram
Mitchell Johnson	Jeetan Patel	Shaun Tait	Jeetan Patel
Shaun Tait	Mathew Sinclair	Adam Voges	Mathew Sinclair
Nathan Bracken	Scott Styris	Luke Pomersbach	Scott Styris
	Ross Taylor		Ross Taylor
	Lou Vincent		Lou Vincent

== Tour match ==
7 December

CA Chairman's XI; 285 (47 overs)	v	New Zealand; 9/278 (50 overs)
Luke Pomersbach 88 (65); David Hussey 73 (53); Jacob Oram 3/41 (7 overs)		Brendon McCullum 119 (126); Mark Gillespie 30* (26); David Hussey 2/23 (10 overs)

CA Chairman's XI won by 7 runs
WACA Ground, Perth
Umpires: Ian Lock and Mick Martell
Player of the match: Brendon McCullum

== KFC Twenty20 International ==
11 December
09:05 UTC

Australia; 6/186 (20 overs)	v	New Zealand; 132 (18.3 overs)
Andrew Symonds 85* (46); Michael Clarke 33 (26); Mark Gillespie 2/39 (4 overs)		Jacob Oram 66* (31); Scott Styris 18 (15); Ashley Noffke 3/18 (3.3 overs)

Australia won by 54 runs
WACA Ground, Perth
Umpires: Steve Davis & Peter Parker
Player of the match: Andrew Symonds

== Chappell-Hadlee series ==
=== First ODI: 14 December, Adelaide ===
14 December
03:15 UTC Scorecard

New Zealand; 7/254 (50 overs)	v	Australia; 3/255 (42.3 overs)
Brendon McCullum 96 (103); Ross Taylor 50 (52); Shaun Tait 3/59 (10 overs)		Ricky Ponting 107* (108); Adam Gilchrist 51 (29); Kyle Mills 2/68 (10 overs)

Australia won by 7 wickets with 45 balls remaining
Adelaide Oval, Adelaide
Umpires: Mark Benson & Steve Davis
Player of the match: Ricky Ponting

Australia led the series 1–0

=== Second ODI: 16 December, Sydney ===
16 December
03:15 UTC Scorecard

New Zealand; 3/30 (6 overs)	v	Australia
Scott Styris 12* (13); Ross Taylor 5* (8); Brett Lee 2/12 (3 overs)

No result
Sydney Cricket Ground, Sydney
Umpires: Mark Benson and Steve Davis

Australia led the series 1–0

=== Third ODI: 20 December, Hobart ===
20 December
23:00 UTC Scorecard

Australia; 6/282 (50 overs)	v	New Zealand; 168 (34 overs)
Ricky Ponting 134* (133); Andrew Symonds 52 (63); Jacob Oram 2/34 (10 overs)		Scott Styris 75 (79); Mark Gillespie 24 (24); Brett Lee 3/47 (9 overs)

Australia won by 114 runs with 96 balls remaining
Bellerive Oval, Hobart
Umpires: Mark Benson & Peter Parker
Player of the match: Ricky Ponting

Australia won the series 2–0

== See also ==
- Australian cricket team in 2007–08
