= Peter Nevill =

Australian cricketer (born 1985)

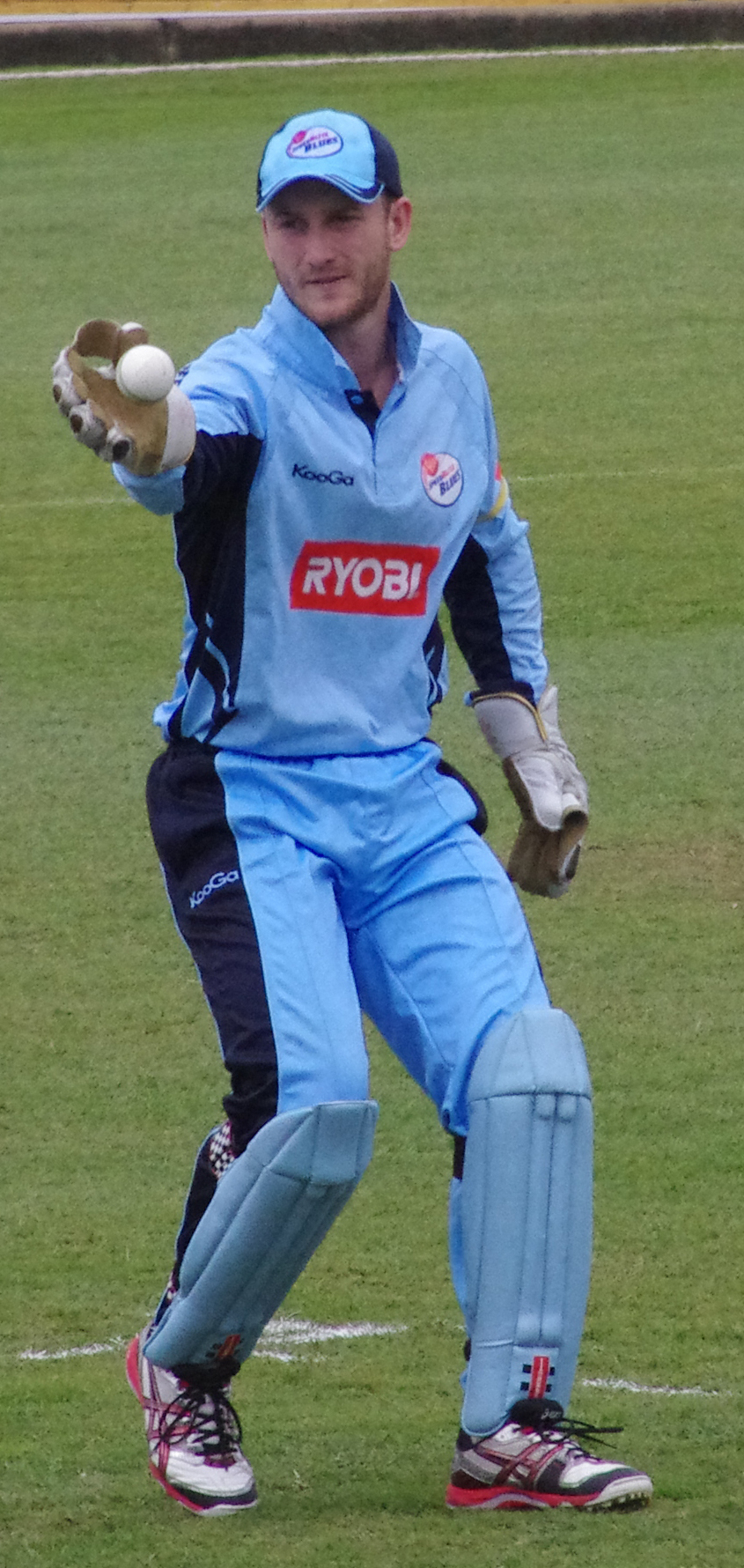

Personal information
- Full name: Peter Michael Nevill
- Born: 13 October 1985 (age 41); Hawthorn, Victoria, Australia
- Height: 1.82 m (6 ft 0 in)
- Batting: Right-handed
- Bowling: Right-arm off break
- Role: Wicket-keeper-batsman

International information
- National side: Australia (2015–2016)
- Test debut (cap 443): 16 July 2015 v England
- Last Test: 12 November 2016 v South Africa
- T20I debut (cap 81): 4 March 2016 v South Africa
- Last T20I: 9 September 2016 v Sri Lanka

Domestic team information
- Years: Team
- 2008/09–2021/22: New South Wales (squad no. 19)
- 2011/12–2012/13: Sydney Sixers
- 2012/13–2016/17: Melbourne Renegades
- 2017/18: Sydney Sixers (squad no. 19)
- 2021/22: Melbourne Stars (squad no. 85)

Career statistics
Competition	Test	FC	LA	T20
Matches	17	126	77	57
Runs scored	468	5,927	1,205	374
Batting average	22.28	36.81	22.73	14.38
100s/50s	0/3	10/33	0/6	0/0
Top score	66	235*	74	33
Catches/stumpings	61/2	391/25	111/10	22/9
- Source: ESPNcricinfo, 16 January 2022

Peter Michael Nevill (born 13 October 1985) is an Australian former cricketer who played 17 Tests and 9 T20 internationals for Australia. He also represented New South Wales and the Melbourne Stars, having previously played for the Melbourne Renegades and the Sydney Sixers. He was Australia's regular Test wicket-keeper from the second test of 2015 Ashes series until being dropped in November 2016. He made his Twenty20 International debut for Australia against South Africa on 4 March 2016. He retired in April 2022.

== Domestic career ==
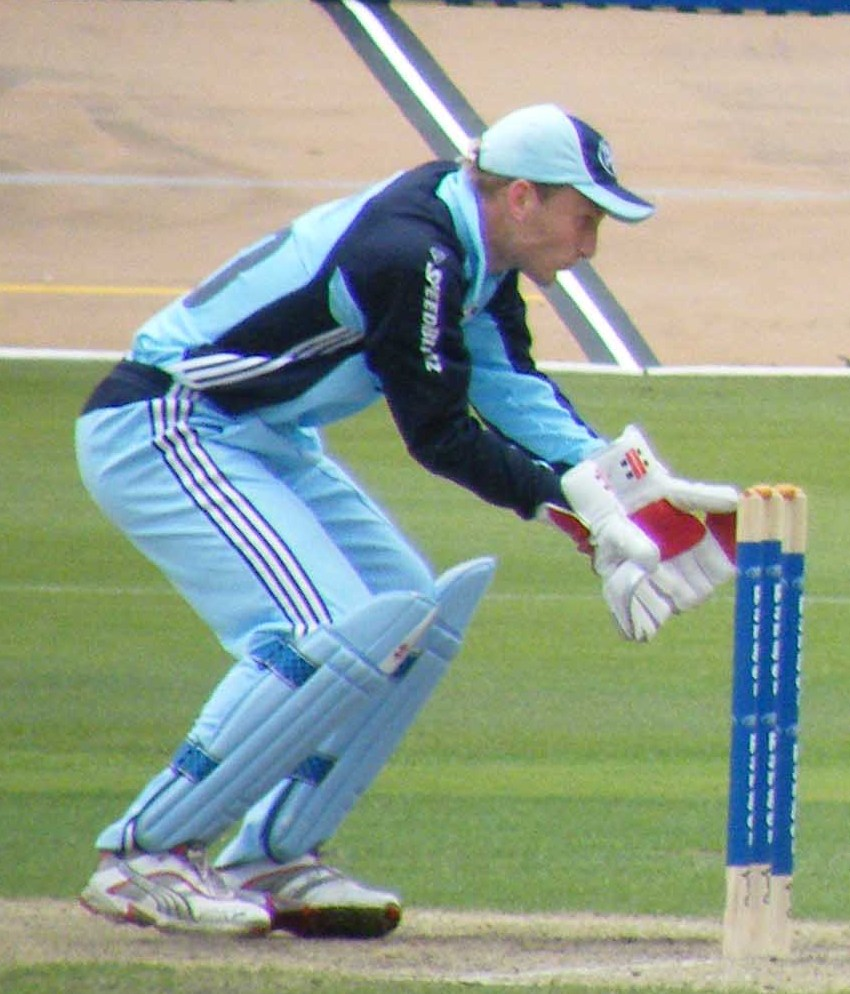
Nevill playing for New South Wales in 2008

Playing as a wicket-keeper, Nevill played for the Australian under-19 cricket team, and made his first-class début for New South Wales against Victoria at the Melbourne Cricket Ground in February 2009. In that match, Nevill made 18 and 0 and took one catch. In March 2012, he was called up to the Australian squad during the team's tour of the West Indies, in place of Brad Haddin to tend to his sick daughter, Mia, although he did not play a game on the tour.

On 16 January 2017, Nevill was hit in the face by a cricket bat during the 2016–17 Big Bash League match between the Melbourne Renegades and the Adelaide Strikers. The bat slipped out of the hands of Brad Hodge and hit Nevill breaking his cheekbone.

=== 2017–18 season ===
Nevill played for New South Wales in the 2017–18 JLT One-Day Cup. On 8 October, Nevill equalled the record for the most dismissals by a wicket-keeper in a List A game in the match between New South Wales and Cricket Australia XI. Across six matches in the tournament he was involved in 19 dismissals.

=== Retirement ===
In April 2022, Nevill announced his retirement from cricket. Nevill was New South Wales most capped Sheffield Shield captain.

== International career ==
Nevill was selected to go to England for the 2015 Ashes series, and made his Test debut for the second Test at Lord's after Brad Haddin made himself unavailable for selection due to family reasons. His baggy green cap was presented by Steve Waugh. Nevill finished with seven catches on debut, and seven dismissals overall, to be tied for second for catches overall, but an Ashes debut record. He also scored 45 runs in the first innings, just missing his first half-century on debut, however he went on to score 57 in the second innings of his third Test at Edgbaston.

On 9 January 2016, Nevill made his debut for Melbourne Renegades as teammate Matthew Wade, Australia's limited-overs wicket-keeper was called up for international duties. Nevill ran himself out after Adam Zampa was hit on the nose off his deflection from a shot from Dwayne Bravo, as it went on to hit the stumps.

On 9 February 2016, a day after Australia lost the Chappell-Hadlee series to New Zealand, Nevill was named as the wicketkeeper of choice for ICC World T20 after Matthew Wade was dropped for poor glovesmanship. Despite his modest batting average, it was speculated that with a deep T20 batting lineup, the side could afford a specialist wicket-keeper.

Batting against Sri Lanka in July 2016 while trying to save the match, Peter Nevill along with Steve O'Keefe set the record for the slowest partnership in the history of Test cricket for any wicket with a scoring rate of just 0.13 for the 9th wicket (4 runs off 174 balls). The slow scoring rate was magnified by O'Keefe's series-ending hamstring injury from the previous day.

In November 2016, Nevill was dropped from the Test side after the second Test of the South Africa series and replaced with Matthew Wade. A week later he made 179* in a Sheffield Shield match.
