= Adam Zampa =

Australian cricketer (born 1992)

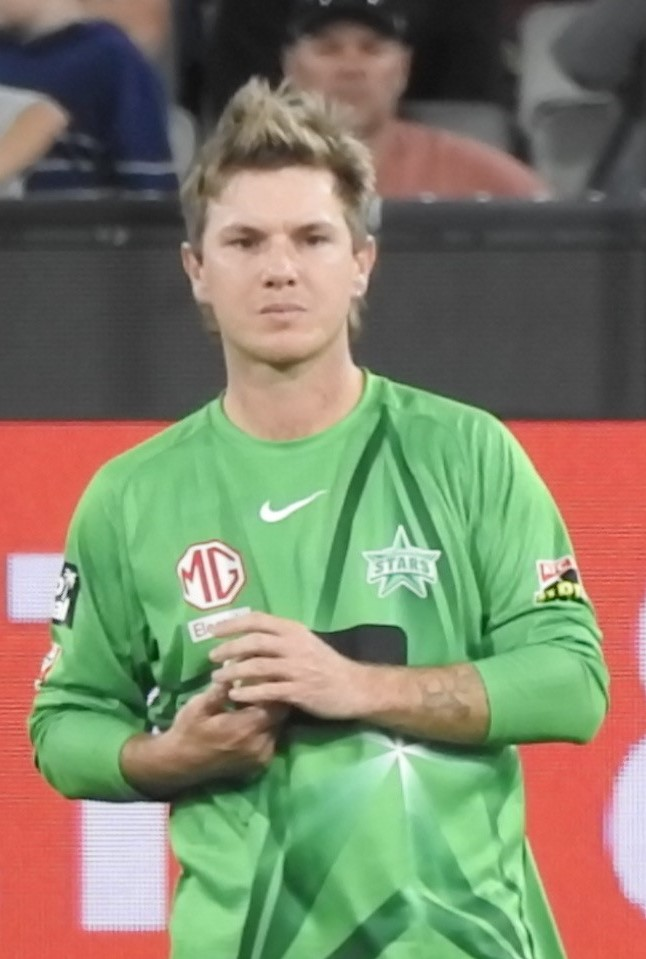
- Zampa playing for Melbourne Stars in 2021–22

Personal information
- Born: 31 March 1992 (age 34); Shellharbour, New South Wales, Australia
- Nickname: Zorba
- Height: 175 cm (5 ft 9 in)
- Batting: Right-handed
- Bowling: Right-arm Leg-Break
- Role: Bowler

International information
- National side: Australia (2016–present)
- ODI debut (cap 212): 6 February 2016 v New Zealand
- Last ODI: 15 November 2026 v England
- ODI shirt no.: 88
- T20I debut (cap 82): 7 March 2016 v South Africa
- Last T20I: 21 June 2026 v Bangladesh
- T20I shirt no.: 88

Domestic team information
- Years: Team
- 2012/13, 2020/21–2025/26: New South Wales
- 2012/13: Sydney Thunder
- 2013/14–2019/20: South Australia
- 2013/14–2014/15: Adelaide Strikers
- 2015/16–2022/23: Melbourne Stars
- 2016–2017: Rising Pune Supergiants
- 2016: Guyana Amazon Warriors
- 2018–2019: Essex
- 2018: Jamaica Tallawahs
- 2020: Royal Challengers Bangalore
- 2022: Welsh Fire
- 2023: Rajasthan Royals
- 2023–2025: Oval Invincibles
- 2023/24–present: Melbourne Renegades
- 2025: Sunrisers Hyderabad
- 2025: Surrey
- 2026/27–present: Queensland

Career statistics
| Competition | ODI | T20I | FC | LA |
|---|---|---|---|---|
| Matches | 129 | 119 | 41 | 175 |
| Runs scored | 435 | 80 | 1,239 | 950 |
| Batting average | 9.88 | 4.70 | 21.73 | 13.57 |
| 100s/50s | 0/0 | 0/0 | 0/6 | 0/3 |
| Top score | 36 | 13* | 74 | 66 |
| Balls bowled | 6,687 | 2,563 | 8,257 | 9,266 |
| Wickets | 207 | 154 | 115 | 279 |
| Bowling average | 29.95 | 20.49 | 46.56 | 30.12 |
| 5 wickets in innings | 1 | 1 | 2 | 1 |
| 10 wickets in match | 0 | 0 | 1 | 0 |
| Best bowling | 5/35 | 5/19 | 6/62 | 5/35 |
| Catches/stumpings | 22/– | 16/– | 9/– | 33/– |
Medal record
Men's cricket
Representing Australia
ICC Cricket World Cup
| Winner | 2023 India |
ICC T20 World Cup
| Winner | 2021 UAE & Oman |
- Source: ESPNcricinfo, 22 November 2026

Adam Zampa (born 31 March 1992) is an Australian cricketer who plays for the Australia national cricket team in both One Day International (ODI) and Twenty20 International (T20I) cricket. He also plays for New South Wales in domestic cricket and the Hobart Hurricanes in the Big Bash League. A right-arm leg-break bowler, he is the highest wicket-taker for Australia in T20I.

== Youth career ==
As a child, Zampa bowled medium pace, but Cricket Australia had placed restrictions on how many overs pace bowlers were allowed to bowl in under-14 matches, so he decided to change his bowling style to leg spin, inspired by Australian Test cricketer Shane Warne. Zampa made his way into Australia's under-19 team in 2009 and earned a rookie contract with the Blues in 2010 after playing a role by representing Australia in their successful 2010 Under-19 Cricket World Cup campaign. Zampa played in two youth Test matches and eight youth ODIs, taking 11 wickets across the two formats.

== Domestic career ==
=== New South Wales ===
As a result of Zampa's youth career for Australia, he was given a rookie contract with New South Wales in 2010, but he did not get any opportunities to prove himself at state-level because New South Wales also had a number of other successful spin bowlers, such as Nathan Hauritz, Steve O'Keefe and Steve Smith. He did get another opportunity to represent Australia before his first-class debut, playing in the 2011 Hong Kong Cricket Sixes.

Zampa made his first-class debut for New South Wales in the 2012–13 Sheffield Shield season against Queensland. He took five wickets in a three-wicket win. Despite not having a contract with a Big Bash League team until a week before BBL|02 began, he played for the Sydney Thunder and was highly rated by Trevor Hohns. He finished the season having played three first-class matches, taking ten wickets at an average of 23 runs per wicket.

=== South Australia ===
After the season he accepted an offer to play for South Australia, in both first-class and one-day matches and for South Australia's Twenty20 team, the Adelaide Strikers. He was tempted by the guaranteed starts he would get in South Australia's team as they had just lost Test spinner Nathan Lyon to New South Wales. During the 2013 winter, he spent three months training at the Centre of Excellence before joining the South Australian squad for the 2013–14 season. The move to South Australia proved a useful one for progressing Zampa's career as he had the opportunity to work with experienced South African spinner Johan Botha, who was the captain of the South Australian team at the time of his move.

Zampa had an impressive performance in the 2014–15 Matador BBQs One-Day Cup, getting on a hat-trick and taking overall figures of 4/18 despite South Australia losing the match to Western Australia. In 2015, Zampa signed on for the Redbacks for two more seasons, but in order to get more experience, he changed Twenty20 teams to the Melbourne Stars, where he would have the opportunity to play alongside international stars Michael Clarke and Kevin Pietersen.

The 2015–16 summer was the most successful of Zampa's career to that point. He impressed in both List A cricket and Twenty20 cricket, and in 2016, was included in Australia's squad for both One Day Internationals and Twenty20 Internationals, but he struggled in first-class cricket. In the 2015–16 Matador BBQs One-Day Cup, he recorded figures of 4/48 against Cricket Australia XI to help take South Australia into the tournament's elimination final. In BBL|05, he was part of an unusual dismissal, running out Peter Nevill with his nose.

=== Return to New South Wales ===
Zampa returned to New South Wales ahead of the 2020-21 season, after seven seasons in South Australia.

=== Queensland ===
Zampa switched allegiances to Queensland ahead of the 2026-27 season, due to Brisbane being significantly closer than Sydney to his home in Byron Bay, on the Far North Coast of New South Wales.

=== Franchise cricket ===
In April 2022, he was bought by the Welsh Fire for the 2022 season of The Hundred.

== International career (2016–present) ==
He made his ODI debut on 6 February 2016 in the second match of 2015–16 Chappell–Hadlee Trophy series. He made his Twenty20 International debut for Australia against South Africa on 4 March 2016. Zampa became a regular member of both the ODI and T20I squad for Australia. Zampa was named in Australia's squad for the 2016 World Twenty20 before he had made his T20I debut for Australia in South Africa. Despite how recently he'd been added to the squad, he was Australia's leading wicket-taker with five wickets at an average of 13.80 and an economy rate of 6.27, including a breakout performance against Bangladesh with figures of 3/23.

With Zampa's rise to Australia's national team he also started to play in Twenty20 franchises as an overseas player. Playing for Rising Pune Supergiant in the Indian Premier League against the Sunrisers Hyderabad, he took 6 wickets for 19 runs and ranked as the third best performance as a bowler in the history of the IPL after 6/14 by Sohail Tanvir and 6/12 by Alzarri Joseph. Zampa bowled his first over for the match in the 8th over of Sunrisers Hyderabad's innings, but was taken out of the attack immediately without taking a wicket. He wasn't brought back on until the 16th over, in which he took one wicket. Captain MS Dhoni gave him an extended spell after his wicket, and he took two wickets in the 18th over and three more wickets in the 20th over, bringing his total to six. He was named man of the match for his performance, and this was also the record for the best bowling figures by a bowler in Twenty20 history in a losing team. Zampa also played in the Caribbean Premier League for the Guyana Amazon Warriors, taking the most wickets out of all spin bowlers for the tournament with 15 wickets at an average of 18.46.

Zampa was surprisingly dropped from Australia's Twenty20 team for the second match of a three-match series against Sri Lanka in 2016–17 after bowling well in the series opener and taking two wickets. Zampa described being dropped as a "kick in the guts", saying his recent form indicated he was one of the best Twenty20 spin bowlers in the world. Without Zampa Australia lost both the match and the series. Zampa was brought back into the team for the final match of the series, and he was named the man of the match with 3/25 as Australia won the game.

Despite all of Zampa's successes in the shorter forms of cricket, he was still unable to break into Australia's Test team. He was unable to reach exceptional form in the Sheffield Shield, being a victim of South Australia's very strong pace attack, with Chadd Sayers and Kane Richardson taking all of the wickets themselves and not leaving opportunities for Zampa to stand out. Australia played a Test series in India in early 2017, and former New Zealand captain Stephen Fleming touted him as a possible addition to Australia's squad given his ability to bowl well on Indian pitches, but he was not included in the squad. Instead, Zampa continued playing in the Sheffield Shield and had his first five-wicket haul in a first-class innings when he took career-best figures of 6/62 in the first innings against Queensland before taking another four wickets in the second innings to accomplish his first ten-wicket haul in a first-class match.

Zampa was in Australia's squad for the 2017 ICC Champions Trophy, but he didn't get many opportunities to play when two of Australia's three group stage matches were washed out and Australia was unable to progress to the finals. In April 2019, he was named in Australia's squad for the 2019 Cricket World Cup. In August 2021, Zampa was named in Australia's squad for the 2021 ICC Men's T20 World Cup. On 4 November 2021, in Australia's T20 World Cup match against Bangladesh, Zampa took his first five-wicket haul in T20 cricket.

In March 2022, during the opening match of the series against Pakistan, Zampa took his 100th wicket in ODI cricket.

In September 2022, he took his first ODI five-wicket haul, against New Zealand in Cairns.

In September 2023, he tied with fellow Australian Mick Lewis, the unwanted record of most runs conceded by a bowler in ODIs, going 0/113 versus South Africa. This record was broken on 25 October when Bas de Leede of the Netherlands Recorded figures of 2/115 against Australia in the ICC World Cup 2023.

Zampa played a crucial part in Australia's successful 2023 ICC World Cup campaign. Zampa came into the tournament as the only specialist spinner in the team after Ashton Agar was removed from the squad due to injury. On 16 October 2023. He received the man of the match in Australia's first victory of the tournament against Sri Lanka with figures of 4/47. On 20 October 2023, Zampa was the pick of the bowlers taking 4 wickets giving 53 runs with an economy of 5.30 and helped his team to win over Pakistan. On 3 November 2023, against England. Zampa recorded figures of 3/21 dismissing set batsmen Ben Stokes and Moeen Ali. He also took a difficult catch in the outfield causing the dismissal of David Willey. Notably, he also added vital runs to the total from the lower order, scoring 29 runs off 19 deliveries. His all round effort earned him his second man of the match of the tournament. Zampa's consistency saw him finish the tournament as the 2nd highest wicket taker in the tournament. Taking 23 wickets from 11 matches, the most wickets ever taken by an Australian Spinner at a World Cup and tying Murali's record of the most wickets ever taken at a World Cup by a spinner.

In May 2024, he was named in Australia's squad for the 2024 ICC Men's T20 World Cup tournament. On 11 June 2024 he became the first Australian bowler to take 100 wickets in T20 internationals by dismissing Bernard Scholtz of Namibia.

== Personal life ==
Zampa lives on a hobby farm in the Byron Bay Hinterland, approximately 60 km south of the Queensland-New South Wales border. He is married to Harriet Palmer; the couple have a son. He is a vegan and has appeared in advertisements for PETA.

== Records and achievements ==
Zampa took his 100th T20I wicket during Australia's tour of the West Indies in 2025. This made him the first Australian to reach this milestone.

=== International five-wicket hauls ===
==== ODI five-wicket hauls ====
| Wkts | Runs | Overs | Econ | Match | Batters | Opponents | City | Venue | Year |
|---|---|---|---|---|---|---|---|---|---|
| 5 | 35 | 9 | 3.88 | 72 | Kane Williamson; Daryl Mitchell; Tim Southee; Matt Henry; Trent Boult | New Zealand | Cairns, Australia | Cazalys Stadium | 2022 |

==== T20I five-wicket hauls ====
| Wkts | Runs | Overs | Econ | Match | Batters | Opponents | City | Venue | Year |
|---|---|---|---|---|---|---|---|---|---|
| 5 | 21 | 4 | 4.75 | 54 | Afif Hossain; Shamim Hossain; Mahedi Hasan; Mustafizur Rahman; Shoriful Islam | Bangladesh | Dubai, UAE | Dubai International Cricket Stadium | 2021 |
