= Scott Henry (cricketer) =

Australian cricketer (born 1989)

Personal information
- Full name: Scott Oliver Henry
- Born: 14 February 1989 (age 37); Mudgee, New South Wales, Australia
- Height: 183 cm (6 ft 0 in)
- Batting: Left-handed
- Bowling: Slow left-arm orthodox

Domestic team information
- Years: Team
- 2011–15: New South Wales (squad no. 14)
- 2015: Queensland
- 2012–13: Melbourne Stars
- FC debut: 25 October 2011 NSW v Victoria
- LA debut: 16 September 2012 NSW v Western Australia

Career statistics
| Competition | FC | LA | T20 |
|---|---|---|---|
| Matches | 36 | 13 | 1 |
| Runs scored | 1705 | 337 | 6 |
| Batting average | 28.41 | 25.92 | 6.00 |
| 100s/50s | 2/10 | 0/3 | 0/0 |
| Top score | 142 | 66 | 6 |
| Balls bowled | 12 | – | – |
| Wickets | 0 | – | – |
| Bowling average | – | – | – |
| 5 wickets in innings | – | – | – |
| 10 wickets in match | – | – | – |
| Best bowling | – | – | – |
| Catches/stumpings | 17/– | 6/– | 0/– |
- Source: ESPNCricinfo, 29 January 2019

Scott Oliver Henry (born 14 February 1989, in Mudgee, New South Wales) is an Australian former cricketer who played for New South Wales and Queensland.

A left-handed batsman, he made his first class debut playing for New South Wales against Victoria in October 2011.

Henry scored an unbeaten double century against the touring Sri Lanka's in 2012 and hit a half century on his Ryobi cup debut against Western Australia at the WACA in Perth.

He played regularly including every game of the 2014–15 Sheffield Shield season but was cut from the squad following the signing of test cricketer Ed Cowan.

Following a move to Queensland, he scored a century on debut in October 2015. It was his maiden first class century and came against Victoria at the MCG.

He played one game for the Melbourne Stars in December 2012 during 2012–13 Big Bash League season, scoring 6 runs before being run out. He then signed to play for the Sydney Thunder in the Big Bash League for 2014–15 season, but did not play any more T20 games.

He completed an ACA internship programme at Queensland cricket in the commercial and marketing team.

He took up a position as Operations Manager at University of Queensland Cricket Club in January 2018.

== See also ==
- List of New South Wales representative cricketers
