= The Test (Australian TV series) =

Documentary series about the Australia men's cricket team

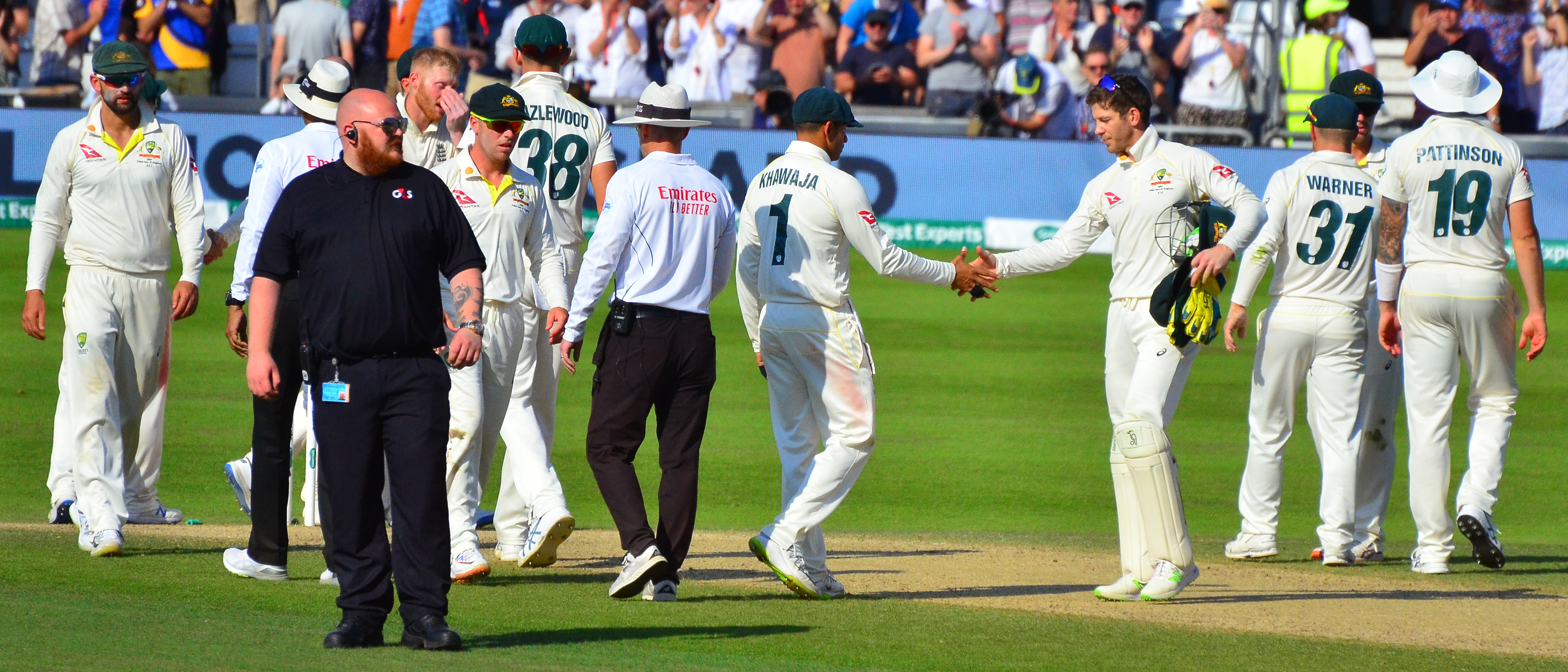
- A visual from the 2019 Ashes series, as shown in the docu-series
- Also known as: The Test: A New Era for Australia's Team
- Genre: Docu-series
- Directed by: Adrian Brown
- Starring: Australian national cricket team
- Country of origin: Australia
- Original language: English
- No. of seasons: 3
- No. of episodes: 15

Production
- Producers: Mish Armstrong; Adrian Brown; Richard Ostroff
- Production location: Australia
- Running time: 43–61 minutes
- Production companies: Amazon Studios; Whooshka Media; Cricket Australia

Original release
- Network: Amazon Prime Video
- Release: 12 March 2020 – present

The Test, known as The Test: A New Era for Australia's Team in its first season, is an Australian docu-series, produced by Amazon Studios for Amazon Prime Video, and co-produced by Cricket Australia. The first season was released on Prime Video on 12 March 2020 and consists of 8 episodes. A second season, consisting of 4 episodes, was released on 13 January 2023. A 3-episode third season was released on 24 May 2024.

The docu-series follows the Australian men's cricket team. The first season follows the team's path to redemption under the leadership of captain Tim Paine and head coach Justin Langer in the 18 months after the 2018 Australian ball-tampering scandal. The second season follows the team after the exit of Paine as captain and the subsequent departure of Langer at the end of 2021 and beginning of 2022. The third season follows the team in England during the 2023 Ashes series.

An edited, feature-length version of the first season aired on the Seven Network on 4 October 2020.

== Synopsis ==
=== Season 1 ===
The first season is a behind-the-scenes look at the Australian men's team's fall from grace and its path to regain its integrity in the 18 months after the 2018 ball-tampering scandal.

==== Episode 1 ====
The series begins with the 2018 Australian ball-tampering scandal which rocks Australian cricket, the subsequent press conferences, and the bans from play for those found involved: captain Steve Smith, deputy David Warner, and Australian opener Cameron Bancroft. Darren Lehmann resigns as head coach, while Tim Paine replaces Smith as the new captain of the national team.

A few weeks later, former cricketer Justin Langer is announced by Cricket Australia as the new head coach. The episode ends with the promise of a better future under the leadership of Paine and Langer, who introduce an ethical code of conduct within the Australian setup as well as the gesture of shaking hands with the opposing team before the commencement of a match as a mark of respect and good sportsmanship.

==== Episodes 2–8 ====
The series then shifts to an account of the next 18 months of the Australian men's team from their sole perspective. It includes their first draws against Pakistan in the United Arab Emirates, India's first Test series win during the Australian summer as well as Australia's first win against Sri Lanka, their time in India for ODI's and Twenty20 games, and the return of Smith and Warner to the team just before the 2019 Cricket World Cup in England.

The last two episodes spotlights Australia's contributions during the 2019 Ashes series, and documents Steve Smith's hit on the neck with a bouncer during the Second Test and Australia's near win in the Third Test without Smith. The season ends with Australia's retention of the Ashes urn by winning the Fourth Test.

=== Season 2 ===
The second season has four episodes and follows the team during the end of 2021 and the beginning of 2022, which sees the resignation of captain Tim Paine for improper conduct off the field as well as the departure of head coach Justin Langer amongst rumours of player dissatisfaction with his leadership style. During this period the team takes on England in the 2021–22 Ashes series and travels to Pakistan for the first time in over two decades, as well as drawing a test series against Sri Lanka.

=== Season 3 ===
The third season has three episodes and follows the team in England during June and July 2023 as they take on India in the 2023 ICC World Test Championship final before competing in the 2023 Ashes series where they face a resurgent England and their new and aggressive "Bazball" playing style. The season also covered the Australian team's real-time reactions to the Carey-Bairstow stumping during the second test match at Lord's, London.

== Cast ==
=== Australian players and coaches ===
- (Australia) Tim Paine
- (Australia) Justin Langer (Head Coach)
- (Australia) Steve Smith
- (Australia) David Warner
- (Australia) Marcus Harris
- (Australia) Pat Cummins
- (Australia) Nathan Lyon
- (Australia) Aaron Finch
- (Australia) Marnus Labuschagne
- (Australia) Jhye Richardson
- (Australia) Usman Khawaja
- (Australia) Glenn Maxwell
- (Australia) Brad Haddin (Fielding Coach)
- (Australia) Peter Siddle
- (Australia) Travis Head
- (Australia) Mitchell Marsh
- (Australia) Shaun Marsh
- (Australia) Steve Waugh (Mentor)
- (Australia) Marcus Stoinis
- (Australia) Ricky Ponting (Mentor)
- (Australia) Mitchell Starc
- (Australia) Josh Hazlewood
- (Australia) Jason Behrendorff
- (Australia) Peter Handscomb
- (Australia) Ashton Turner
- (Australia) Adam Zampa
- (Australia) Adam Gilchrist (Mentor)
- (Australia) Allan Border (Mentor)
- (Australia) Cameron Green
- (Australia) Michael Neser
- (Australia) Scott Boland
- (Australia) Mitchell Swepson
- (Australia) Josh Inglis
- (Australia) Ashton Agar
- (Australia) Matthew Wade
- (Australia) Todd Murphy
- (Australia) Andrew McDonald (Assistant Coach, Later Head Coach)
- (England) Graeme Hick (Batting Coach)

=== Players from other teams ===
- (India) Virat Kohli
- (India) Cheteshwar Pujara
- (India) Bhuvneshwar Kumar
- (India) MS Dhoni
- (India) Kedar Jadhav
- (England) Ben Stokes
- (England) Mark Wood
- (England) Stuart Broad
- (England) Jofra Archer
- (England) Jonny Bairstow
- (England) Eoin Morgan
- (England) Joe Root
- (Pakistan) Babar Azam
- (Pakistan) Sarfaraz Ahmed

=== Commentators and analysts ===
- (Australia) Gideon Haigh
- (Australia) Peter Lalor
- (Australia) Gerard Whateley
- (Australia) (England) Alison Mitchell
- (England) (Netherlands) Isabelle Westbury
- (England) Isa Guha
- (England) Jonathan Agnew
- (India) Harsha Bhogle
- (India) Ravi Shastri
- (Sri Lanka) Kumar Sangakkara
