= Indian cricket team in Australia in 2018–19 =

International cricket tour

	Australia	India
- Dates: 21 November 2018 – 18 January 2019
Captains	Tim Paine (Tests); Aaron Finch (T20Is & ODIs)	Virat Kohli

Test series
- Result: India won the 4-match series 2–1
Most runs	Marcus Harris (258)	Cheteshwar Pujara (521)
Most wickets	Nathan Lyon (21)	Jasprit Bumrah (21)
- Player of the series: Cheteshwar Pujara (Ind)

One Day International series
- Results: India won the 3-match series 2–1
Most runs	Shaun Marsh (224)	MS Dhoni (193)
Most wickets	Jhye Richardson (6)	Bhuvneshwar Kumar (8)
- Player of the series: MS Dhoni (Ind)

Twenty20 International series
- Results: 3-match series drawn 1–1
Most runs	Glenn Maxwell (78)	Shikhar Dhawan (117)
Most wickets	Adam Zampa (3)	Krunal Pandya (5)
- Player of the series: Shikhar Dhawan (Ind)

The India cricket team toured Australia from November 2018 to January 2019 to play four Tests, three One Day Internationals (ODIs) and three Twenty20 International (T20I) matches. Initially, the Test match at the Adelaide Oval was planned to be a day/night fixture, but the Board of Control for Cricket in India (BCCI) declined the offer from Cricket Australia to play the match under lights. In April 2018, the Western Australian Cricket Association confirmed that the Perth Stadium would host its first ever Test match. During the second Test, it became the tenth venue in Australia to host a Test match.

India's regular wicket-keeper for limited overs matches, MS Dhoni, was not named in the side's squad for the T20I fixtures for this series and the ones against the West Indies. Instead, India's Test wicket-keeper, Rishabh Pant, was selected for T20Is as well. The T20I series was drawn 1–1, after the second match finished in a no result. India won the Test series 2–1, after the fourth match of the series finished as a draw. India became the first Asian team to win a Test series in Australia.

In the ODI series that followed, Australia won the first match by 34 runs, recording their 1,000th win in international cricket. However, India won the next two games to take the series 2–1, recording their first bilateral ODI series victory in Australia.

== Squads ==
Tests		ODIs		T20Is	
Australia	India	Australia	India	Australia	India
Tim Paine (c, wk); Josh Hazlewood (vc); Mitchell Marsh (vc); Pat Cummins; Aaron Finch; Peter Handscomb; Marcus Harris; Travis Head; Usman Khawaja; Marnus Labuschagne; Nathan Lyon; Shaun Marsh; Peter Siddle; Mitchell Starc; Chris Tremain	Virat Kohli (c); Ajinkya Rahane (vc); Mayank Agarwal; Ravichandran Ashwin; Jasprit Bumrah; Ravindra Jadeja; Bhuvneshwar Kumar; Hardik Pandya; Rishabh Pant (wk); Parthiv Patel (wk); Cheteshwar Pujara; KL Rahul; Mohammed Shami; Ishant Sharma; Rohit Sharma; ~~Prithvi Shaw~~; Hanuma Vihari; Murali Vijay; Kuldeep Yadav; Umesh Yadav	Aaron Finch (c); Alex Carey (vc, wk); Jason Behrendorff; Peter Handscomb; Usman Khawaja; Nathan Lyon; Mitchell Marsh; Shaun Marsh; Glenn Maxwell; Jhye Richardson; Peter Siddle; Billy Stanlake; Marcus Stoinis; Ashton Turner; Adam Zampa	Virat Kohli (c); Rohit Sharma (vc); Khaleel Ahmed; ~~Jasprit Bumrah~~; Yuzvendra Chahal; Shikhar Dhawan; MS Dhoni (wk); Ravindra Jadeja; Kedar Jadhav; Dinesh Karthik; Bhuvneshwar Kumar; ~~Hardik Pandya~~; ~~KL Rahul~~; Ambati Rayudu; Mohammed Shami; Vijay Shankar; Mohammed Siraj; Kuldeep Yadav	Aaron Finch (c); Alex Carey (vc, wk); Ashton Agar; Jason Behrendorff; Nathan Coulter-Nile; Chris Lynn; Glenn Maxwell; Ben McDermott; D'Arcy Short; Billy Stanlake; Mitchell Starc; Marcus Stoinis; Andrew Tye; Adam Zampa	Virat Kohli (c); Rohit Sharma (vc); Khaleel Ahmed; Jasprit Bumrah; Yuzvendra Chahal; Shikhar Dhawan; Shreyas Iyer; Dinesh Karthik (wk); Bhuvneshwar Kumar; Manish Pandey; Krunal Pandya; Rishabh Pant (wk); KL Rahul; Washington Sundar; Kuldeep Yadav; Umesh Yadav

Mitchell Starc was added to Australia's T20I squad for the third match, replacing Billy Stanlake, who was injured. Prithvi Shaw was ruled out of India's Test squad due to injury and was replaced by Mayank Agarwal. Hardik Pandya was also added to India's squad for the last two Test matches. Marnus Labuschagne was added to Australia's squad for the fourth Test. Jasprit Bumrah was rested for the ODI series and was replaced by Mohammed Siraj in India's squad. Mitchell Marsh was ruled out of Australia's squad for the first ODI due to illness and was replaced by Ashton Turner.

On 11 January 2019, Hardik Pandya and KL Rahul were suspended by the BCCI following controversial comments they made on the Indian talk show Koffee with Karan earlier in the month. They were ruled out of the ODI series of this tour, and all of the fixtures of India's tour to New Zealand. Vijay Shankar was added to India's ODI squad as a replacement.

== T20I series ==
=== 1st T20I ===
21 November 2018
17:50 (D/N)
Scorecard

Australia; 4/158 (17 overs)	v	India; 7/169 (17 overs)
Glenn Maxwell 46 (24); Kuldeep Yadav 2/24 (4 overs)		Shikhar Dhawan 76 (42); Adam Zampa 2/22 (4 overs)

Australia won by 4 runs (DLS method)
The Gabba, Brisbane
Umpires: Simon Fry (Aus) and Paul Wilson (Aus)
Player of the match: Adam Zampa (Aus)

- India won the toss and elected to field.
- India were set a revised target of 174 runs in 17 overs due to rain.

=== 2nd T20I ===
23 November 2018
18:50 (N)
Scorecard

Australia; 7/132 (19 overs)	v	India
Ben McDermott 32* (30); Bhuvneshwar Kumar 2/20 (3 overs)

No result
Melbourne Cricket Ground, Melbourne
Umpires: Gerard Abood (Aus) and Simon Fry (Aus)

- India won the toss and elected to field.
- Rain during India's innings prevented any further play.

=== 3rd T20I ===
25 November 2018
18:50 (N)
Scorecard

Australia; 6/164 (20 overs)	v	India; 4/168 (19.4 overs)
D'Arcy Short 33 (29); Krunal Pandya 4/36 (4 overs)		Virat Kohli 61* (41); Adam Zampa 1/22 (4 overs)

India won by 6 wickets
Sydney Cricket Ground, Sydney
Umpires: Gerard Abood (Aus) and Paul Wilson (Aus)
Player of the match: Krunal Pandya (Ind)

- Australia won the toss and elected to bat.

== Tour match ==
=== Four-day match: Cricket Australia XI vs India ===
28 November–1 December 2018
Scorecard

India	v	Cricket Australia XI
358 (92 overs); Prithvi Shaw 66 (69); Aaron Hardie 4/50 (13 overs)		544 (151.1 overs); Harry Nielsen 100 (170); Mohammed Shami 3/97 (24 overs)
211/2 (43.4 overs); Murali Vijay 129 (132); D'Arcy Short 1/34 (6 overs)

Match drawn
Sydney Cricket Ground, Sydney
Umpires: Gerard Abood (Aus) and Paul Wilson (Aus)
Player of the match: Harry Nielsen (Cricket Australia XI)

- Cricket Australia XI won the toss and elected to field.
- No play was possible on day 1 due to rain.

== Test series ==
Entering the series, India held the Border–Gavaskar Trophy after winning the 2017 series 2–1. Australia won the previous series at home 2–0 in 2014–15.

=== 1st Test ===
6–10 December 2018
Scorecard

India	v	Australia
250 (88 overs); Cheteshwar Pujara 123 (246); Josh Hazlewood 3/52 (20 overs)		235 (98.4 overs); Travis Head 72 (167); Jasprit Bumrah 3/47 (24 overs)
307 (106.5 overs); Cheteshwar Pujara 71 (204); Nathan Lyon 6/122 (42 overs)		291 (119.5 overs); Shaun Marsh 60 (166); Mohammed Shami 3/65 (20 overs)

India won by 31 runs
Adelaide Oval, Adelaide
Umpires: Kumar Dharmasena (SL) and Nigel Llong (Eng)
Player of the match: Cheteshwar Pujara (Ind)

- India won the toss and elected to bat.
- Marcus Harris (Aus) made his Test debut.
- Cheteshwar Pujara (Ind) scored his 5,000th run in Tests.
- Rishabh Pant (Ind) equalled the Test record for the most dismissals in a match by a wicket-keeper (11).
- The match saw the most dismissals through catches in Tests (35).
- This was the first time that India had won the opening Test of a series in Australia.

=== 2nd Test ===
14–18 December 2018
Scorecard

Australia	v	India
326 (108.3 overs); Marcus Harris 70 (141); Ishant Sharma 4/41 (20.3 overs)		283 (105.5 overs); Virat Kohli 123 (257); Nathan Lyon 5/67 (34.5 overs)
243 (93.2 overs); Usman Khawaja 72 (213); Mohammed Shami 6/56 (24 overs)		140 (56 overs); Ajinkya Rahane 30 (47); Nathan Lyon 3/39 (19 overs)

Australia won by 146 runs
Perth Stadium, Perth
Umpires: Kumar Dharmasena (SL) and Chris Gaffaney (NZ)
Player of the match: Nathan Lyon (Aus)

- Australia won the toss and elected to bat.
- This was the first Test to be played at this venue.
- Virat Kohli (Ind) scored his 25th century in Tests.
- Tim Paine won his first Test as captain of Australia.

=== 3rd Test ===
26–30 December 2018
Scorecard

India	v	Australia
7/443d (169.4 overs); Cheteshwar Pujara 106 (319); Pat Cummins 3/72 (34 overs)		151 (66.5 overs); Marcus Harris 22 (35); Jasprit Bumrah 6/33 (15.5 overs)
8/106d (37.3 overs); Mayank Agarwal 42 (102); Pat Cummins 6/27 (11 overs)		261 (89.3 overs); Pat Cummins 63 (114); Jasprit Bumrah 3/53 (19 overs)

India won by 137 runs
Melbourne Cricket Ground, Melbourne
Umpires: Marais Erasmus (SA) and Ian Gould (Eng)
Player of the match: Jasprit Bumrah (Ind)

- India won the toss and elected to bat.
- No play was possible during the first session on day 5 due to rain.
- Mayank Agarwal (Ind) made his Test debut.
- India retained the Border–Gavaskar Trophy as a result of winning this match.
- India became the fifth side to reach 150 wins in Test cricket.
- Virat Kohli equalled Sourav Ganguly's record of most overseas Test wins as India captain.

=== 4th Test ===
3–7 January 2019
Scorecard

India	v	Australia
7/622d (167.2 overs); Cheteshwar Pujara 193 (373); Nathan Lyon 4/178 (57.2 overs)		300 (104.5 overs); Marcus Harris 79 (120); Kuldeep Yadav 5/99 (31.5 overs)
		0/6 (4 overs) (f/o); Usman Khawaja 4* (12)

Match drawn
Sydney Cricket Ground, Sydney
Umpires: Ian Gould (Eng) and Richard Kettleborough (Eng)
Player of the match: Cheteshwar Pujara (Ind)

- India won the toss and elected to bat.
- No play was possible after tea on day 3 due to rain.
- No play was possible after lunch on day 4 due to rain.
- No play was possible on day 5 due to rain.
- Rishabh Pant became the first wicket-keeper for India to score a century in Australia.
- Virat Kohli became the first Asian captain to win a test series in Australia.

== ODI series ==
=== 1st ODI ===
12 January 2019
13:20 (D/N)
Scorecard

Australia; 5/288 (50 overs)	v	India; 9/254 (50 overs)
Peter Handscomb 73 (61); Kuldeep Yadav 2/54 (10 overs)		Rohit Sharma 133 (129); Jhye Richardson 4/26 (10 overs)

Australia won by 34 runs
Sydney Cricket Ground, Sydney
Umpires: Michael Gough (Eng) and Paul Wilson (Aus)
Player of the match: Jhye Richardson (Aus)

- Australia won the toss and elected to bat.
- Jason Behrendorff (Aus) made his ODI debut.
- Bhuvneshwar Kumar (Ind) took his 100th wicket in ODIs.
- MS Dhoni became the fifth cricketer to score 10,000 runs for India in ODIs.
- This was Australia's 1,000th win in international cricket.

=== 2nd ODI ===
15 January 2019
13:50 (D/N)
Scorecard

Australia; 9/298 (50 overs)	v	India; 4/299 (49.2 overs)
Shaun Marsh 131 (123); Bhuvneshwar Kumar 4/45 (10 overs)		Virat Kohli 104 (112); Glenn Maxwell 1/16 (4 overs)

India won by 6 wickets
Adelaide Oval, Adelaide
Umpires: Richard Kettleborough (Eng) and Sam Nogajski (Aus)
Player of the match: Virat Kohli (Ind)

- Australia won the toss and elected to bat.
- Mohammed Siraj (Ind) made his ODI debut.

=== 3rd ODI ===
18 January 2019
13:20 (D/N)
Scorecard

Australia; 230 (48.4 overs)	v	India; 3/234 (49.2 overs)
Peter Handscomb 58 (63); Yuzvendra Chahal 6/42 (10 overs)		MS Dhoni 87* (114); Jhye Richardson 1/27 (10 overs)

India won by 7 wickets
Melbourne Cricket Ground, Melbourne
Umpires: Michael Gough (Eng) and Paul Wilson (Aus)
Player of the match: Yuzvendra Chahal (Ind)

- India won the toss and elected to field.
- Vijay Shankar (Ind) made his ODI debut.
- Yuzvendra Chahal (Ind) recorded the joint-best figures by a bowler in ODIs in Australia and the best by a spinner (6/42).

== In popular culture ==
An Australian docu-series – The Test was produced, following the Australian national cricket team in the aftermath of the Australian ball tampering scandal. The third and fourth episodes of Season 1 featured Australia playing the 4 tests against India.
