= Australian cricket team in India in 2018–19 =

International cricket tour

Australian cricket team in India in 2019
	India	Australia
- Dates: 24 February – 13 March 2019
Captains	Virat Kohli	Aaron Finch

One Day International series
- Results: Australia won the 5-match series 3–2
Most runs	Virat Kohli (310)	Usman Khawaja (383)
Most wickets	Kuldeep Yadav (10)	Pat Cummins (14)
- Player of the series: Usman Khawaja (Aus)

Twenty20 International series
- Results: Australia won the 2-match series 2–0
Most runs	KL Rahul (97)	Glenn Maxwell (169)
Most wickets	Jasprit Bumrah (3)	Nathan Coulter-Nile (4)
- Player of the series: Glenn Maxwell (Aus)

The Australia cricket team toured India from February and March 2019 to play two Twenty20 International (T20I) and five One Day International (ODI) matches. The ODI fixtures were part of both teams' preparation for the 2019 Cricket World Cup. Australia won the T20I series 2–0, their first T20I series win against India.

India won the first two ODIs of the series, and with their victory in the second match, registered their 500th win in the format. India became the second team, after Australia, to record 500 wins in ODIs. Despite losing the first two matches, Australia went on to win the ODI series 3–2. It was the first time that Australia had won an ODI series in India since 2009. It was also the first series loss for India at home since losing 2–3 to South Africa in October 2015, and Virat Kohli's first ODI series loss at home.

== Squads ==
Shaun Marsh was included in Australia's ODI squad, with D'Arcy Short named as cover for Marsh. Andrew Tye replaced Kane Richardson in Australia's ODI squad after Richardson was ruled out due to injury.

Siddarth Kaul was selected for first two ODIs, with Bhuvneshwar Kumar replacing him for remaining three ODIs in India's ODI squad. Ahead of the tour, Hardik Pandya was ruled out of India's squads due to injury. Ravindra Jadeja replaced him in India's ODI squad, but no replacement was made in their T20I squad. MS Dhoni was rested for the final two ODIs of the series, with Rishabh Pant named as the wicket-keeper in India's squad in his place.

ODIs		T20Is	
India	Australia	India	Australia
Virat Kohli (c); Rohit Sharma (vc); Jasprit Bumrah; Yuzvendra Chahal; Shikhar Dhawan; MS Dhoni (wk); Ravindra Jadeja; Kedar Jadhav; Siddarth Kaul; Bhuvneshwar Kumar; ~~Hardik Pandya~~; Rishabh Pant; KL Rahul; Ambati Rayudu; Mohammed Shami; Vijay Shankar; Kuldeep Yadav	Aaron Finch (c); Alex Carey (vc, wk); Pat Cummins (vc); Jason Behrendorff; Nathan Coulter-Nile; Peter Handscomb; Usman Khawaja; Nathan Lyon; Shaun Marsh; Glenn Maxwell; Jhye Richardson; ~~Kane Richardson~~; D'Arcy Short; Marcus Stoinis; Ashton Turner; Andrew Tye; Adam Zampa	Virat Kohli (c); Rohit Sharma (vc); Jasprit Bumrah; Yuzvendra Chahal; Shikhar Dhawan; MS Dhoni (wk); Dinesh Karthik; Siddarth Kaul; Mayank Markande; ~~Hardik Pandya~~; Krunal Pandya; Rishabh Pant; KL Rahul; Vijay Shankar; Umesh Yadav	Aaron Finch (c); Alex Carey (vc, wk); Pat Cummins (vc); Jason Behrendorff; Nathan Coulter-Nile; Peter Handscomb; Usman Khawaja; Nathan Lyon; Glenn Maxwell; Jhye Richardson; ~~Kane Richardson~~; D'Arcy Short; Marcus Stoinis; Ashton Turner; Adam Zampa

== T20I series ==
=== 1st T20I ===
24 February 2019
19:00 (N)
Scorecard

India; 126/7 (20 overs)	v	Australia; 127/7 (20 overs)
KL Rahul 50 (36); Nathan Coulter-Nile 3/26 (3 overs)		Glenn Maxwell 56 (43); Jasprit Bumrah 3/16 (4 overs)

Australia won by 3 wickets
Dr. Y. S. Rajasekhara Reddy ACA–VDCA Cricket Stadium, Visakhapatnam
Umpires: Nitin Menon (Ind) and Chettithody Shamshuddin (Ind)
Player of the match: Nathan Coulter-Nile (Aus)

- Australia won the toss and elected to field.
- Mayank Markande (Ind) and Peter Handscomb (Aus) both made their T20I debuts.
- Jasprit Bumrah (Ind) became the second bowler for India to take 50 wickets in T20Is.

=== 2nd T20I ===
27 February 2019
19:00 (N)
Scorecard

India; 190/4 (20 overs)	v	Australia; 194/3 (19.4 overs)
Virat Kohli 72* (38); Jason Behrendorff 1/17 (3 overs)		Glenn Maxwell 113* (55); Vijay Shankar 2/38 (4 overs)

Australia won by 7 wickets
M.Chinnaswamy Stadium, Bengaluru
Umpires: Anil Chaudhary (Ind) and C. K. Nandan (Ind)
Player of the match: Glenn Maxwell (Aus)

- Australia won the toss and elected to field.
- Glenn Maxwell (Aus) became the first batsman for Australia to score three centuries in T20Is.
- MS Dhoni (Ind) played his last T20I match.

== ODI series ==
=== 1st ODI ===
2 March 2019
13:30 (D/N)
Scorecard

Australia; 236/7 (50 overs)	v	India; 240/4 (48.2 overs)
Usman Khawaja 50 (76); Mohammed Shami 2/44 (10 overs)		Kedar Jadhav 81* (87); Nathan Coulter-Nile 2/46 (9 overs)

India won by 6 wickets
Rajiv Gandhi International Cricket Stadium, Hyderabad
Umpires: Nitin Menon (Ind) and Joel Wilson (WI)
Player of the match: Kedar Jadhav (Ind)

- Australia won the toss and elected to bat.
- Ashton Turner (Aus) made his ODI debut.
- Aaron Finch (Aus) played in his 100th ODI.

=== 2nd ODI ===
5 March 2019
13:30 (D/N)
Scorecard

India; 250 (48.2 overs)	v	Australia; 242 (49.3 overs)
Virat Kohli 116 (120); Pat Cummins 4/29 (9 overs)		Marcus Stoinis 52 (65); Kuldeep Yadav 3/54 (10 overs)

India won by 8 runs
Vidarbha Cricket Association Stadium, Nagpur
Umpires: Kumar Dharmasena (SL) and Nitin Menon (Ind)
Player of the match: Virat Kohli (Ind)

- Australia won the toss and elected to field.
- Ravindra Jadeja became the third cricketer for India to score 2,000 runs and take 150 wickets in ODIs.
- Virat Kohli (Ind) became the second batsman, after Sachin Tendulkar, to score forty centuries in ODIs.
- Virat Kohli became the fastest player, in terms of innings, to reach 9,000 runs in international cricket as captain (159).

=== 3rd ODI ===
8 March 2019
13:30 (D/N)
Scorecard

Australia; 313/5 (50 overs)	v	India; 281 (48.2 overs)
Usman Khawaja 104 (113); Kuldeep Yadav 3/64 (10 overs)		Virat Kohli 123 (95); Pat Cummins 3/37 (8.2 overs)

Australia won by 32 runs
JSCA International Stadium Complex, Ranchi
Umpires: Chettithody Shamshuddin (Ind) and Joel Wilson (WI)
Player of the match: Usman Khawaja (Aus)

- India won the toss and elected to field.
- Usman Khawaja (Aus) scored his first century in ODIs.
- Ambati Rayudu (Ind) played his last ODI.

=== 4th ODI ===
10 March 2019
13:30 (D/N)
Scorecard

India; 358/9 (50 overs)	v	Australia; 359/6 (47.5 overs)
Shikhar Dhawan 143 (115); Pat Cummins 5/70 (10 overs)		Peter Handscomb 117 (105); Jasprit Bumrah 3/63 (8.5 overs)

Australia won by 4 wickets
Punjab Cricket Association IS Bindra Stadium, Mohali
Umpires: Anil Chaudhary (Ind) and Kumar Dharmasena (SL)
Player of the match: Ashton Turner (Aus)

- India won the toss and elected to bat.
- Pat Cummins (Aus) took his first five-wicket haul in ODIs.
- Peter Handscomb (Aus) scored his first century in ODIs.
- This was Australia's highest successful run chase, and the fifth-highest overall in ODIs.

=== 5th ODI ===
13 March 2019
13:30 (D/N)
Scorecard

Australia; 272/9 (50 overs)	v	India; 237 (50 overs)
Usman Khawaja 100 (106); Bhuvneshwar Kumar 3/48 (10 overs)		Rohit Sharma 56 (89); Adam Zampa 3/46 (10 overs)

Australia won by 35 runs
Feroz Shah Kotla Ground, Delhi
Umpires: C. K. Nandan (Ind) and Joel Wilson (WI)
Player of the match: Usman Khawaja (Aus)

- Australia won the toss and elected to bat.
- Rohit Sharma (Ind) became the joint-third fastest batsman, in terms of innings, to score 8,000 runs in ODIs (200).

== In popular culture ==
An Australian docu-series - The Test was produced, following the Australian national cricket team in the aftermath of the Australian ball tampering scandal. The fifth episode of Season 1 featured Australia playing the 5 ODIs against India.
