= Indian cricket team in Ireland in 2018 =

International cricket tour

	Ireland	India
- Dates: 27 – 29 June 2018
Captains	Gary Wilson	Virat Kohli

Twenty20 International series
- Results: India won the 2-match series 2–0
Most runs	James Shannon (62)	Rohit Sharma (97)
Most wickets	Peter Chase (5)	Kuldeep Yadav (7)
- Player of the series: Yuzvendra Chahal (Ind)

The India cricket team toured Ireland in June 2018 to play two Twenty20 Internationals (T20Is), with both matches played in Malahide. Before the second men's match was played, Ireland women played against Bangladesh women on the same day at the same venue. Prior to the series, Ireland played a tri-series against Netherlands and Scotland as preparation for these matches.

India last visited Ireland in 2007, playing a One Day International (ODI) match, with India winning by nine wickets. The teams have only played one T20I match previously, in the group stage of the 2009 ICC World Twenty20 tournament, with India winning the fixture by eight wickets. The first of the two matches of the series was India's 100th T20I match.

The Board of Control for Cricket in India (BCCI) announced India's squad for the trip to Ireland on 8 May 2018, naming Virat Kohli as the captain. However, Kohli was initially signed by the English side Surrey County Cricket Club to play in the 2018 County Championship. Surrey's website stated that he would be playing for them throughout June, including their final fixture against Yorkshire, scheduled to be played from 25 to 28 June 2018. The BCCI were in discussions with Surrey to reach an amicable solution for both sides over the fixture clash. However, during the match in the 2018 Indian Premier League on 17 May, Kohli suffered an injury and his spell with Surrey was cancelled. The BCCI went on to state that they were confident that Kohli would be fit enough to play in the tours to Ireland and England.

India won the series 2–0. India scored more than 200 runs in both matches, the first time they had done so in consecutive games. Their victory in the second match was their biggest winning margin, in terms of runs, in T20Is, and the joint-second biggest winning margin in T20Is by any team. Ireland were bowled out for 70 runs in 12.3 overs, which was the third-shortest innings in T20Is.

== Squads ==
Ireland	India
Gary Wilson (c); Andrew Balbirnie; Peter Chase; George Dockrell; ~~Josh Little~~; Andy McBrine; Kevin O'Brien; William Porterfield; Stuart Poynter; Boyd Rankin; James Shannon; Simi Singh; Paul Stirling; Stuart Thompson	Virat Kohli (c); Jasprit Bumrah; Yuzvendra Chahal; Shikhar Dhawan; MS Dhoni (wk); Dinesh Karthik; Siddarth Kaul; Bhuvneshwar Kumar; Manish Pandey; Hardik Pandya; KL Rahul; Suresh Raina; Rohit Sharma; Washington Sundar; Kuldeep Yadav; Umesh Yadav

Josh Little was ruled out of Ireland's squad due to injury. A replacement was not named, but Cricket Ireland brought in David Delany in a development capacity.

== T20I Series ==
=== 1st T20I ===
27 June 2018
16:00
Scorecard

India; 208/5 (20 overs)	v	Ireland; 132/9 (20 overs)
Rohit Sharma 97 (61); Peter Chase 4/35 (4 overs)		James Shannon 60 (35); Kuldeep Yadav 4/21 (4 overs)

India won by 76 runs
The Village, Dublin
Umpires: Mark Hawthorne (Ire) and Roland Black (Ire)
Player of the match: Kuldeep Yadav (Ind)

- Ireland won the toss and elected to field.
- This was India's 100th T20I.

=== 2nd T20I ===
29 June 2018
16:00
Scorecard

India; 213/4 (20 overs)	v	Ireland; 70 (12.3 overs)
KL Rahul 70 (36); Kevin O'Brien 3/40 (4 overs)		Gary Wilson 15 (18); Kuldeep Yadav 3/16 (2.3 overs)

India won by 143 runs
The Village, Dublin
Umpires: Roland Black (Ire) and Alan Neill (Ire)
Player of the match: KL Rahul (Ind)

- Ireland won the toss and elected to field.
- Siddarth Kaul (Ind) made his T20I debut.
- This was India's biggest winning margin, in terms of runs, and the joint-second biggest winning margin in T20Is by any team in T20Is.
- Ireland's innings was the third-shortest in T20Is.
