= Bangladesh women's national cricket team record by opponent =

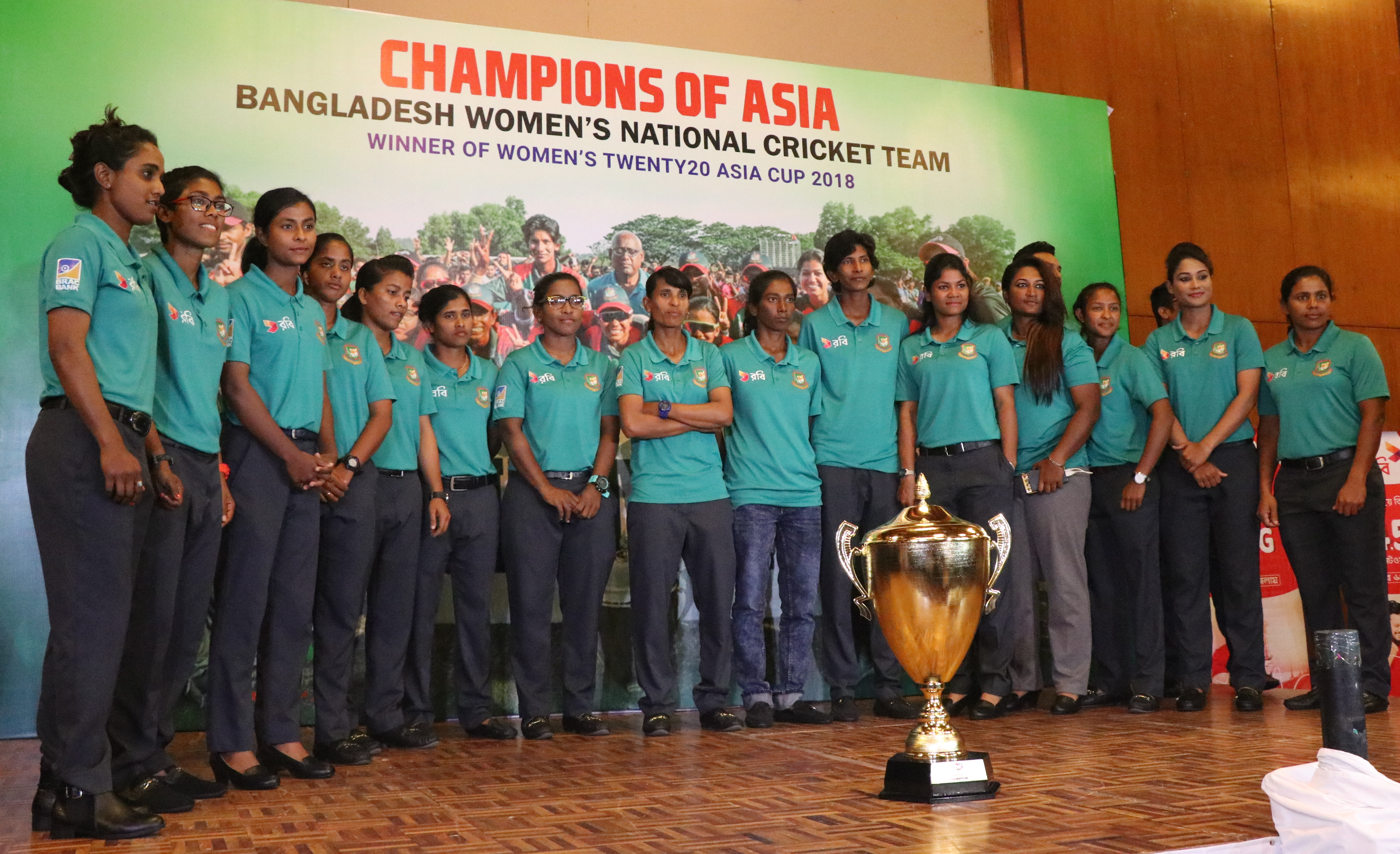
2018 Women's Asia Cup winning Bangladesh national women's team at a reception given by Bangladesh Cricket Board

The Bangladesh women's national cricket team represents Bangladesh in international women's cricket. A full member of the International Cricket Council (ICC), the team is governed by the Bangladesh Cricket Board (BCB).

On 24 November 2011, Bangladesh was granted one-day status after defeating USA by nine wickets in the 2011 Women's Cricket World Cup Qualifier at Dhaka. That win guaranteed that Bangladesh would finish in the top six in the tournament and thus be ranked in the top ten globally, which was the requirement for attaining one-day status. Bangladesh played their first Women's One Day International cricket (WODI) match in that same tournament against Ireland on 26 November 2011; Bangladesh won the match by 82 runs to secure their first win in this format. It was also the first international match for Bangladesh's women's team. Bangladesh had to wait until 2016 to get their first overseas win in this format, again against Ireland, when they beat Ireland by ten runs in the third and final WODI. As the first two matches of the series were washed out, that win in the last WODI marked the first overseas bilateral series win for Bangladesh in this format. However Bangladesh's first bilateral series win came against Pakistan in 2014 when they made a clean sweep over Pakistan in a two-match series. As of 19 January 2021, Bangladesh have played 38 WODI matches, winning 9 and losing 27 (2 matches had no result).

The Bangladesh women's national cricket team first competed in Women's Twenty20 International (WT20I) cricket on 28 August 2012 when they played Ireland in the first match of a Twenty20 tri-nation series in Dublin. They recorded their first victory in that match, beating the Irish side by 4 wickets. The Bangladeshi side would have debuted in the Twenty20 international arena the previous day as they were scheduled to play Pakistan at the same venue, but that one-off match was abandoned without a ball being bowled due to rain. Bangladesh won their first Twenty20 at home against South Africa in the first match of a three match Twenty20 international series in 2012, winning the rain-shortened match by seven wickets. Bangladesh secured their first bilateral T20I series win against Ireland in June 2018, taking the three match series 2–1. The same month the Bangladeshi side won their first multi-team international tournament with victory in the 2018 Asia Cup, denying India a straight seventh title; it was the first time that a Bangladeshi cricket team had won a multi-team international tournament in any version of the game. As of 19 January 2021, they have played 75 WT20I matches and won 27 of them; 48 were lost.

As of 19 January 2021, Bangladesh, alongside Afghanistan and Zimbabwe, is one of the three full members of ICC that is yet to feature in a women's Test cricket.

Bangladesh have faced five teams in Women's ODI cricket, with their most frequent opponent being South Africa, against whom they have played 17 matches. Bangladesh have registered more wins against Pakistan than against any other team, with four. In Women's T20I matches, Bangladesh have played against 18 teams. They have played against Pakistan most frequently in ODI matches. Bangladesh have defeated Ireland in 6 matches, which is their best record in T20Is. Bangladesh have a 100% winning record against four opponents (Scotland, Thailand, Netherlands and Papua New Guinea) that they have encountered in more than one match.

As of 19 January 2021, like their male counterparts, the Bangladeshi women's side has not been involved in any tied international matches.

== Key ==
Key for the tables
Symbol	Meaning
Matches	Number of matches played
Won	Number of matches won
Lost	Number of matches lost
Draw	Number of matches ended in a draw
Tied	Number of matches tied
NR	Number of matches ended with no result
Tie+W	Number of matches tied and then won in a tiebreaker such as a bowl-out or Super Over
Tie+L	Number of matches tied and then lost in a tiebreaker such as a bowl-out or Super Over
Win%	Percentage of games won to those played. (Note: Games that did not have a result are not taken into consideration while calculating the result percentage. Ties are counted as half a win.)
Loss%	Percentage of games drawn to those played.
Draw%	Percentage of games lost to those played.
WL Ratio	Ratio of matches won to matches lost
First	Year of the first match played by Australia against the country
Last	Year of the last match played by Australia against the country
WODI	Women's One Day International cricket
T20I	Twenty20 International
WT20I	Women's Twenty20 International

== One Day International ==
Bangladesh Women's ODI cricket records by opponent
Opponent	Matches	Won	Lost	Tied	NR	Win%	First	Last
Australia	1	0	1	0	0	0	2022	2022
England	1	0	1	0	0	0	2022	2022
India	5	0	5	0	0	0	2013	2022
Ireland	6	3	1	0	2	75	2011	2017
New Zealand	4	0	2	0	2	0	2022	2022
Pakistan	12	6	6	0	0	50	2012	2022
South Africa	18	2	16	0	0	11.11	2012	2022
Sri Lanka	3	0	2	0	1	0	2017	2023
West Indies	1	0	1	0	0	0	2022	2022
Zimbabwe	3	3	0	0	0	0	2021	2021
Total	54	14	35	0	5	25.92	2011	2023
Statistics are correct as of Bangladesh vs Sri Lanka at Colombo, 3rd ODI, 4 May 2023

== Twenty20 International ==
Bangladesh Women's T20I cricket records by opponent
Opponent	Matches	Won	Lost	Tied	Tie+W	Tie+L	NR	Win%	First	Last
Australia	2	0	2	0	0	0	0	0	2020	2023
England	3	0	3	0	0	0	0	0	2014	2018
India	16	3	13	0	0	0	0	18.75	2013	2023
Ireland	11	8	3	0	0	0	0	72.72	2012	2022
Kenya	1	1	0	0	0	0	0	100.00	2022	2022
Malaysia	3	3	0	0	0	0	0	100	2018	2022
Maldives	1	1	0	0	0	0	0	100	2019	2019
Nepal	1	1	0	0	0	0	0	100	2019	2019
Netherlands	2	2	0	0	0	0	0	100	2018	2019
New Zealand	5	0	5	0	0	0	0	0	2020	2023
Pakistan	16	1	15	0	0	0	0	6.25	2012	2022
Papua New Guinea	2	2	0	0	0	0	0	100	2018	2019
Scotland	4	4	0	0	0	0	0	100	2018	2022
South Africa	11	1	10	0	0	0	0	9.09	2012	2023
Sri Lanka	12	3	9	0	0	0	0	25.00	2012	2023
Thailand	6	6	0	0	0	0	0	100	2018	2022
United Arab Emirates	1	1	0	0	0	0	0	100	2018	2018
United States	2	2	0	0	0	0	0	100	2019	2022
West Indies	3	0	3	0	0	0	0	0	2014	2018
Total	102	39	63	0	0	0	0	38.23	2012	2023
Statistics are correct as of Bangladesh vs India at Mirpur, 3rd T20, 13 July 2023
