= List of international cricket five-wicket hauls by Ravichandran Ashwin =

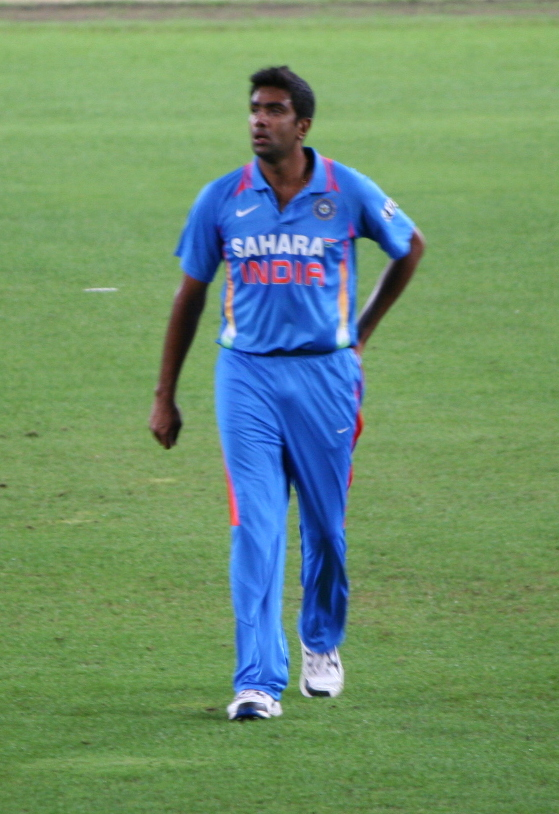
Ashwin has taken a pair of five-wicket hauls in a match on four occasions.

In cricket, a five-wicket haul (also known as a "fifer") refers to a bowler taking five or more wickets in a single innings. This is regarded as a notable achievement, and as of October 2024 only 54 bowlers have taken 15 or more five-wicket hauls at international level in their cricketing careers. Ravichandran Ashwin – a right-arm off break bowler – is a Test, One Day International (ODI) and Twenty20 International (T20I) cricketer who represents the India national cricket team. In a 2016 interview, former Sri Lankan cricketer Muttiah Muralitharan described Ashwin as the "best current Test spinner". As of September 2024, Ashwin has taken 37 five-wicket hauls in international cricket; he ranks joint-fourth in the all-time list, and joint-first among his countrymen. (Note: He is joint-first with Anil Kumble (37).)

Ashwin made his Test debut in November 2011 against the West Indies. He took nine wickets in the match, including a five-wicket haul in the second innings. India won the match and his performance earned him the man of the match honour. His career-best figures of seven wickets for 59 runs came against New Zealand in October 2016; in the process he also became the fifth bowler to take six five-wicket hauls against them. (Note: The feat was earlier achieved by Ian Botham, Dale Steyn, Derek Underwood and Wasim Akram.) He has picked up ten or more wickets in a match on seven occasions. (Note: His tally is joint fourth highest in the all time list, and he shares the position with Sydney Barnes, Clarrie Grimmett and Dennis Lillee.) Ashwin made his ODI and T20I debuts in June 2010 against Sri Lanka and Zimbabwe, respectively, and is yet to take a five-wicket haul in both formats. His four wickets for 25 runs against the United Arab Emirates in the 2015 World Cup remain his best in ODIs, while his figures of four wickets for 8 runs against Sri Lanka are his best in T20Is.

== Key ==
| Symbol | Meaning |
|---|---|
| Date | Day the Test started or ODI held |
| Inn | Innings in which five-wicket haul was taken |
| Overs | Number of overs bowled |
| Runs | Number of runs conceded |
| Wkts | Number of wickets taken |
| Econ | Runs conceded per over |
| Batsmen | Batsmen whose wickets were taken |
| Result | Result for the India team |
| † | 10 or more wickets taken in the match |
| ‡ | Ashwin was selected as man of the match |

== Tests ==
Five-wicket hauls in Test cricket
| No. | Date | Ground | Against | Inn | Overs | Runs | Wkts | Econ | Batsmen | Result |
|---|---|---|---|---|---|---|---|---|---|---|
| 1 | 6 November 2011 ‡ | Feroz Shah Kotla Ground, Delhi | West Indies | 3 | 21.3 | 47 | 6 | 2.18 | Kieran Powell; Darren Bravo; Marlon Samuels; Shivnarine Chanderpaul; Daren Sammy; Ravi Rampaul | Won |
| 2 | 22 November 2011 ‡ | Wankhede Stadium, Mumbai | West Indies | 1 | 52.1 | 156 | 5 | 2.99 | Adrian Barath; Kraigg Brathwaite; Ravi Rampaul; Marlon Samuels; Devendra Bishoo | Drawn |
| 3 | 23 August 2012 † ‡ | Rajiv Gandhi International Cricket Stadium, Hyderabad | New Zealand | 2 | 16.3 | 31 | 6 | 1.87 | Martin Guptill; Ross Taylor; Daniel Flynn; Jeetan Patel; Trent Boult; Chris Martin | Won |
| 4 | 23 August 2012 † ‡ | Rajiv Gandhi International Cricket Stadium, Hyderabad | New Zealand | 3 | 26.5 | 54 | 6 | 2.01 | Ross Taylor; Daniel Flynn; James Franklin; Kruger van Wyk; Trent Boult; Chris Martin | Won |
| 5 | 31 August 2012 | M. Chinnaswamy Stadium, Bangalore | New Zealand | 3 | 22 | 69 | 5 | 3.13 | Kane Williamson; Daniel Flynn; Kruger van Wyk; James Franklin; Tim Southee | Won |
| 6 | 22 February 2013 † | M. A. Chidambaram Stadium, Chennai | Australia | 1 | 42 | 103 | 7 | 2.45 | Ed Cowan; Phillip Hughes; Shane Watson; David Warner; Matthew Wade; Moises Henriques; Nathan Lyon | Won |
| 7 | 22 February 2013 † | M. A. Chidambaram Stadium, Chennai | Australia | 3 | 32 | 95 | 5 | 2.96 | Shane Watson; Ed Cowan; Michael Clarke; James Pattinson; Mitchell Starc | Won |
| 8 | 2 March 2013 | Rajiv Gandhi International Cricket Stadium, Hyderabad | Australia | 3 | 28 | 63 | 5 | 2.25 | David Warner; Phillip Hughes; Glenn Maxwell; Matthew Wade; James Pattinson | Won |
| 9 | 22 March 2013 | Feroz Shah Kotla Ground, Delhi | Australia | 1 | 34 | 57 | 5 | 1.67 | Ed Cowan; Matthew Wade; Mitchell Johnson; Steve Smith; Peter Siddle | Won |
| 10 | 10 June 2015 | Khan Shaheb Osman Ali Stadium, Fatullah | Bangladesh | 2 | 25 | 87 | 5 | 3.48 | Tamim Iqbal; Mushfiqur Rahim; Shakib Al Hasan; Shuvagata Hom; Liton Das | Drawn |
| 11 | 12 August 2015 † | Galle International Stadium, Galle | Sri Lanka | 1 | 13.4 | 46 | 6 | 3.36 | Kumar Sangakkara; Lahiru Thirimanne; Jehan Mubarak; Angelo Mathews; Dhammika Prasad; Rangana Herath | Lost |
| 12 | 20 August 2015 | Paikiasothy Saravanamuttu Stadium, Colombo | Sri Lanka | 4 | 16 | 42 | 5 | 2.62 | Kaushal Silva; Kumar Sangakkara; Lahiru Thirimanne; Dhammika Prasad; Dimuth Karunaratne | Won |
| 13 | 5 November 2015 | Punjab Cricket Association IS Bindra Stadium, Mohali | South Africa | 2 | 24 | 51 | 5 | 2.12 | Stiaan van Zyl; Dean Elgar; Hashim Amla; Dane Vilas; Imran Tahir | Won |
| 14 | 25 November 2015 † ‡ | Vidarbha Cricket Association Stadium, Nagpur | South Africa | 2 | 16.1 | 32 | 5 | 1.97 | Stiaan van Zyl; Dean Elgar; Hashim Amla; Simon Harmer; Morné Morkel | Won |
| 15 | 25 November 2015 † ‡ | Vidarbha Cricket Association Stadium, Nagpur | South Africa | 4 | 29.5 | 66 | 7 | 2.21 | Stiaan van Zyl; Dean Elgar; AB de Villiers; JP Duminy; Dane Vilas; Kagiso Rabada; Morné Morkel | Won |
| 16 | 3 December 2015 | Feroz Shah Kotla Ground, Delhi | South Africa | 4 | 49.1 | 61 | 5 | 1.24 | Dean Elgar; Temba Bavuma; JP Duminy; AB de Villiers; Morné Morkel | Won |
| 17 | 21 July 2016 ‡ | Sir Vivian Richards Stadium, Antigua, Antigua and Barbuda | West Indies | 3 | 25 | 83 | 7 | 3.32 | Rajendra Chandrika; Marlon Samuels; Jermaine Blackwood; Roston Chase; Jason Holder; Devendra Bishoo; Shannon Gabriel | Won |
| 18 | 30 July 2016 | Sabina Park, Kingston, Jamaica | West Indies | 1 | 16 | 52 | 5 | 3.25 | Marlon Samuels; Jermaine Blackwood; Shane Dowrich; Jason Holder; Devendra Bishoo | Drawn |
| 19 | 22 September 2016 † | Green Park Stadium, Kanpur | New Zealand | 4 | 35.3 | 132 | 6 | 3.71 | Martin Guptill; Tom Latham; Kane Williamson; Mitchell Santner; Ish Sodhi; Neil Wagner | Won |
| 20 | 8 October 2016 † ‡ | Holkar Stadium, Indore | New Zealand | 2 | 27.2 | 81 | 6 | 2.96 | Tom Latham; Kane Williamson; Ross Taylor; Luke Ronchi; James Neesham; Trent Boult | Won |
| 21 | 8 October 2016 † ‡ | Holkar Stadium, Indore | New Zealand | 4 | 13.5 | 59 | 7 | 4.27 | Kane Williamson; Ross Taylor; Luke Ronchi; Mitchell Santner; Jeetan Patel; Matt Henry; Trent Boult | Won |
| 22 | 19 November 2016 | Dr. Y.S. Rajasekhara Reddy ACA-VDCA Cricket Stadium, Visakhapatnam | England | 2 | 29.5 | 67 | 5 | 2.24 | Ben Duckett; Joe Root; Ben Stokes; Stuart Broad; James Anderson | Won |
| 23 | 9 December 2016 † | Wankhede Stadium, Mumbai | England | 1 | 44 | 112 | 6 | 2.54 | Joe Root; Moeen Ali; Keaton Jennings; Jonny Bairstow; Ben Stokes; Jake Ball | Won |
| 24 | 9 December 2016 † | Wankhede Stadium, Mumbai | England | 3 | 20.3 | 55 | 6 | 2.68 | Ben Stokes; Jake Ball; Jonny Bairstow; Chris Woakes; Adil Rashid; James Anderson | Won |
| 25 | 4 March 2017 | M. Chinnaswamy Stadium, Bangalore | Australia | 4 | 12.4 | 41 | 6 | 3.23 | David Warner; Mitchell Marsh; Matthew Wade; Mitchell Starc; Peter Handscomb; Nathan Lyon | Won |
| 26 | 2 August 2017 | Sinhalese Sports Club Ground, Colombo | Sri Lanka | 2 | 16.4 | 69 | 5 | 4.14 | Upul Tharanga; Dimuth Karunaratne; Angelo Mathews; Dilruwan Perera; Nuwan Pradeep | Won |
| 27 | 2 October 2019 | Dr. Y. S. Rajasekhara Reddy ACA–VDCA Cricket Stadium, Vishakhapatnam | South Africa | 2 | 46.2 | 145 | 7 | 3.12 | Aiden Markram; Theunis de Bruyn; Faf du Plessis; Quinton de Kock; Vernon Philander; Keshav Maharaj; Kagiso Rabada | Won |
| 28 | 5 February 2021 | M. A. Chidambaram Stadium, Chennai | England | 3 | 17.3 | 61 | 6 | 3.49 | Rory Burns; Dom Sibley; Ben Stokes; Dom Bess; Jofra Archer; James Anderson | Lost |
| 29 | 13 February 2021 ‡ | M. A. Chidambaram Stadium, Chennai | England | 2 | 23.5 | 43 | 5 | 1.80 | Dom Sibley; Dan Lawrence; Ben Stokes; Olly Stone; Stuart Broad | Won |
| 30 | 4 March 2021 | Narendra Modi Stadium, Ahmedabad | England | 4 | 22.5 | 47 | 5 | 2.06 | Zak Crawley; Jonny Bairstow; Joe Root; Jack Leach; Dan Lawrence | Won |
| 31 | 9 February 2023 | Vidarbha Cricket Association Stadium, Nagpur | Australia | 3 | 12 | 37 | 5 | 3.08 | Usman Khawaja; David Warner; Matt Renshaw; Peter Handscomb; Alex Carey | Won |
| 32 | 9 March 2023 | Narendra Modi Stadium, Ahmedabad | Australia | 1 | 47.2 | 91 | 6 | 1.92 | Travis Head; Cameron Green; Alex Carey; Mitchell Starc; Todd Murphy; Nathan Lyon | Drawn |
| 33 | 12 July 2023 † | Windsor Park, Roseau, Dominica | West Indies | 1 | 24.3 | 60 | 5 | 2.44 | Tagenarine Chanderpaul; Kraigg Brathwaite; Alzarri Joseph; Alick Athanaze; Jomel Warrican | Won |
| 34 | 12 July 2023 † | Windsor Park, Roseau, Dominica | West Indies | 3 | 21.3 | 71 | 7 | 3.30 | Kraigg Brathwaite; Jermaine Blackwood; Alick Athanaze; Alzarri Joseph; Rahkeem Cornwall; Kemar Roach; Jomel Warrican | Won |
| 35 | 23 February 2024 | JSCA International Stadium Complex, Ranchi, | England | 3 | 15.5 | 51 | 5 | 3.20 | Ben Duckett; Ollie Pope; Joe Root; Ben Foakes; James Anderson | Won |
| 36 | 9 March 2024 | HPCA Stadium, Dharamsala, | England | 4 | 14 | 77 | 5 | 5.50 | Ben Duckett; Zak Crawley; Ollie Pope; Ben Stokes; Ben Foakes | Won |
| 37 | 19 September 2024 | M. A. Chidambaram Stadium, Chennai, | Bangladesh | 4 | 21 | 88 | 6 | 4.19 | Shadman Islam; Mominul Haque; Mushfiqur Rahim; Shakib Al Hasan; Mehidy Hasan Miraz; Taskin Ahmed | Won |
