= Jahanara Alam =

Bangladeshi cricketer (born 1993)

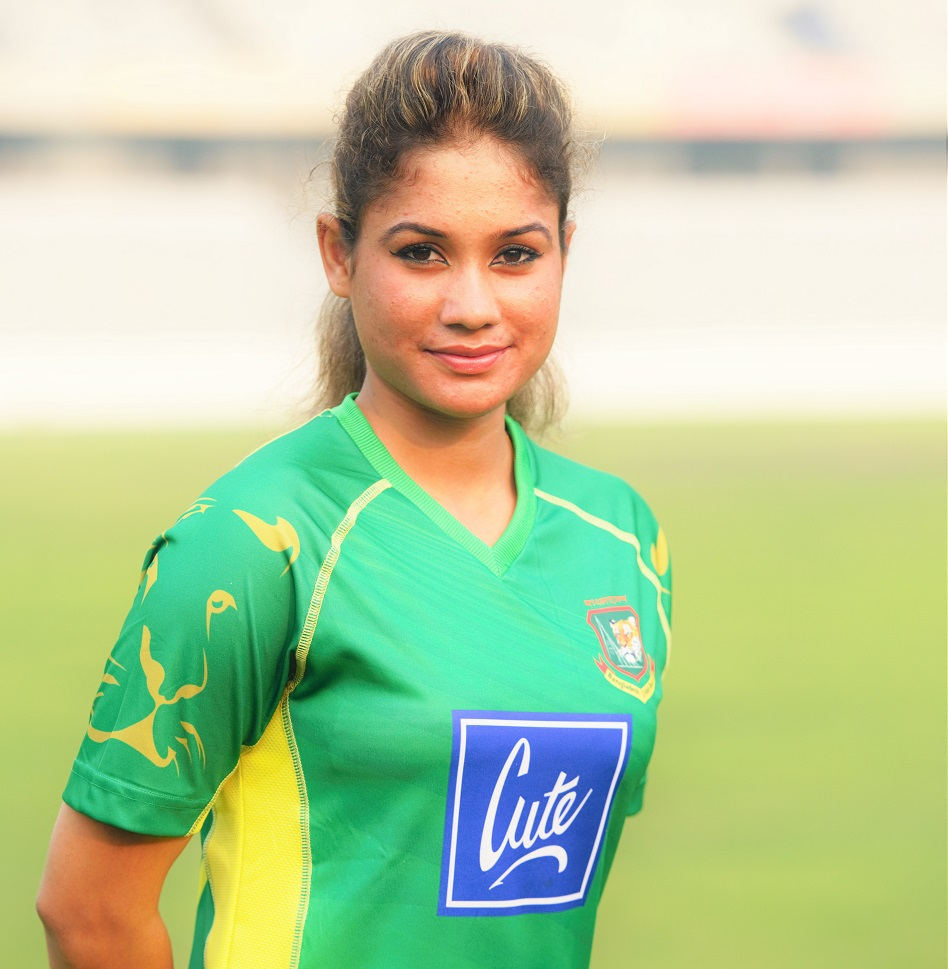

Personal information
- Full name: Jahanara Alam
- Born: 1 April 1993 (age 33); Khulna, Bangladesh
- Batting: Right-handed
- Bowling: Right-arm medium pace
- Role: Bowler

International information
- National side: Bangladesh (2011–present)
- ODI debut (cap 2): 26 November 2011 v Ireland
- Last ODI: 17 December 2022 v New Zealand
- ODI shirt no.: 26
- T20I debut (cap 2): 28 August 2012 v Ireland
- Last T20I: 21 February 2023 v South Africa
- T20I shirt no.: 26

Domestic team information
- Years: Team
- 2008/09: Khulna Division
- 2009/10–2017/18: Sylhet Division
- 2019–2020: Velocity
- 2021/22–present: Northern Zone

Career statistics
Competition	WODI	WT20I
Matches	49	75
Runs scored	181	167
Batting average	7.54	6.42
100s/50s	0/0	0/0
Top score	23	18*
Balls bowled	1,946	1,353
Wickets	46	57
Bowling average	29.34	21.75
5 wickets in innings	0	1
10 wickets in match	0	0
Best bowling	3/18	5/28
Catches/stumpings	8/–	12/–
Medal record
Representing Bangladesh
Women's Cricket
Asian Games
Silver medal – second place	2010 Guangzhou	Team
Silver medal – second place	2014 Incheon	Team
South Asian Games
Gold medal – first place	2019 Kathmandu/Pokhara	Team
Women's Asia Cup
Winner	2018 Malaysia
- Source: ESPNcricinfo, 21 February 2023

Jahanara Alam (Bengali: জাহানারা আলম; born 1 April 1993) is a Bangladeshi cricketer who plays for the Bangladesh women's national cricket team. She is a right-arm medium pace bowler and right-handed batter. She was a member of the team that won a silver medal in cricket against China at the 2010 Asian Games in Guangzhou, China.

== Early life ==
Alam was born and raised in Khulna, where she attended Pioneer Girls High School. By 2007, the year she was in sixth standard, she was playing both handball and volleyball for her school. She lived some distance away, and travelled there by rickshaw, a trip that would take about 40 to 50 minutes.

Alam's interest in sports then attracted the attention of Sheikh Salahuddin, a player and coach of the Khulna Division men's cricket team, who lived opposite the school. Unlike the other school girls, who wore shalwar kameez, Alam would make her rickshaw trip to school in sports attire. Salauddin spotted her on some of her rickshaw journeys, and eventually asked her whether she wanted to play cricket. She immediately agreed.

At that time, Alam was not a follower of cricket, and did not understand the rules. However, she was told that Bangladesh would soon have a national women's team, and that was an incentive for her to try out.

Alam's parents were supportive. "My father only told me to return home before the evening Azaan and not do anything that would bring shame to the family," she told CricTracker in 2020. Even more supportive was her grandmother, who would take her to and from matches.

In her initial cricket trials, Alam "failed miserably". However, her coach had spotted that she had ample natural ability, and she had always been fit. After practising for a month, she became a fast bowler. Shortly afterwards, she was the leading wicket-taker in a seven-team tournament, with 13 wickets, and was called up to the national camp. Her prompt success at cricket caused some problems for her and her family:

"People around my locality ... told [my father] that I should continue with my studies and then get married. They were against me playing cricket, being a girl. My father defended me saying that I wasn't doing anything wrong and he supported me. In the current society, supporting each other is very crucial. Not only girls, but even boys have had to sacrifice their passion for sports to continue studying."

Alam did not, and does not, have a role model. In the first two years she was playing cricket, she was not able to follow the game very much. Then, one of her coaches showed her some YouTube videos of Brett Lee. The coach suggested that she generate more pace and swing by following Lee's bowling action. From then onwards, she would identify and follow two or three players "from every nation", but her one and only cricketing idol is her compatriot Mashrafe Mortaza.

== Career ==
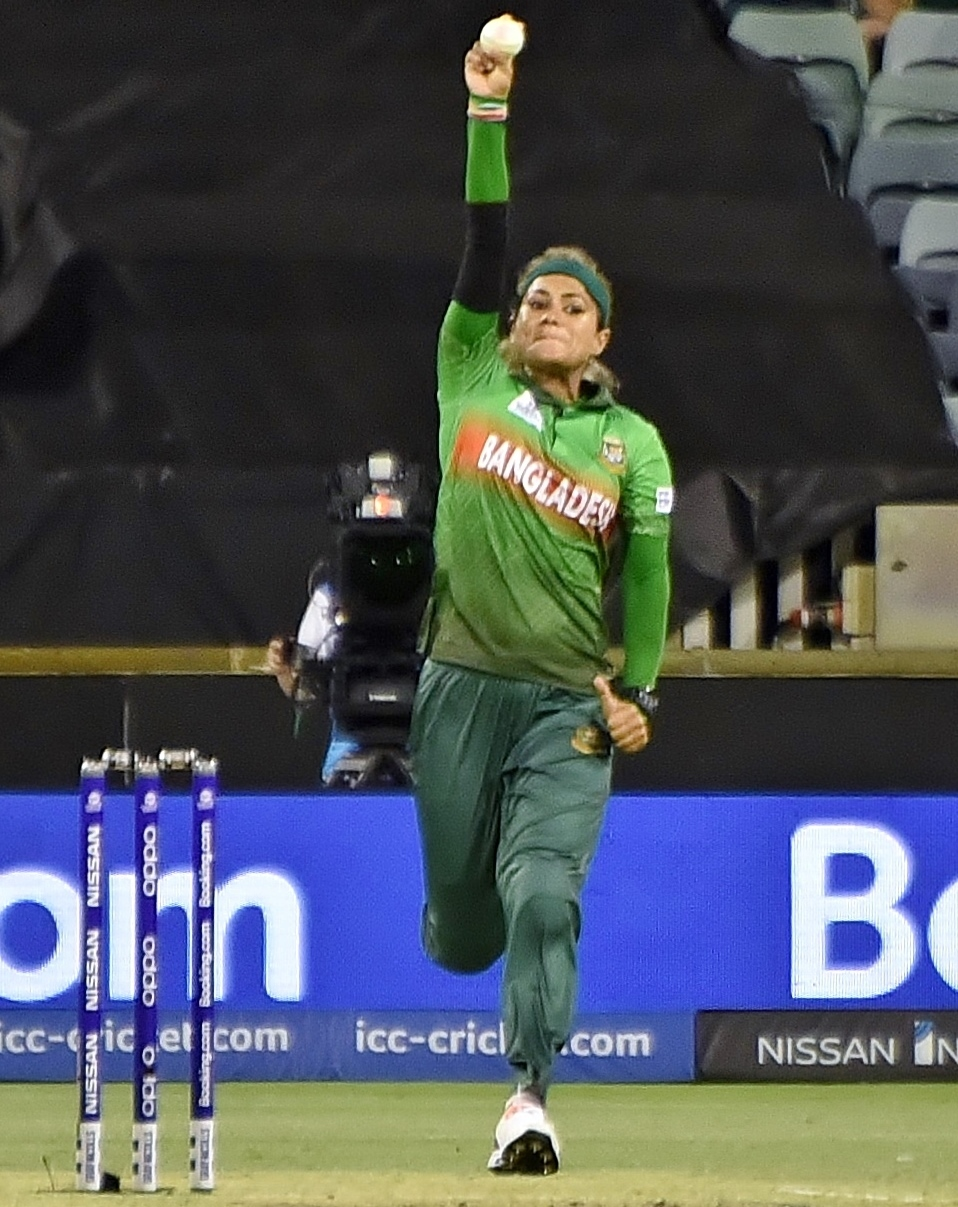
Alam bowling for Bangladesh during the 2020 ICC Women's T20 World Cup

The first time Alam took the field for the national team was during a Hong Kong tour of Bangladesh in March 2008. "When I was selected for Bangladesh, I had to ask my father whether I should play or do my exams?" she has said. His response was "... you may only have one chance to play for your country but you will have 3 chances to pass your exam".

Alam therefore played in all four of the matches in the unofficial 50-over format series. During the last one, at Mirpur Stadium, she took a hat-trick with the only three balls she bowled, in the 47th over, a feat that caused quite a stir:

"... there was a lot of buzz around. My picture was there in the first page of the newspaper and from then onwards, people’s perception started changing. They called me the pride of Khulna, the pride of Bangladesh."

Alam made her ODI debut against Ireland on 26 November 2011. She made her T20I debut against India on 28 August 2012. In June 2018, she was part of Bangladesh's squad that won their first ever Women's Asia Cup title, winning the 2018 Women's Twenty20 Asia Cup tournament. Later the same month, she was named in Bangladesh's squad for the 2018 ICC Women's World Twenty20 Qualifier tournament.

On 28 June 2018, she became the first bowler for Bangladesh to take a five-wicket haul in WT20Is, in a match against Ireland.

In October 2018, she was named in Bangladesh's squad for the 2018 ICC Women's World Twenty20 tournament in the West Indies. She was the joint-leading wicket-taker for Bangladesh in the tournament, with six dismissals in four matches. Following the conclusion of the tournament, she was named as the standout player in the team by the International Cricket Council (ICC).

In August 2019, she was named in Bangladesh's squad for the 2019 ICC Women's World Twenty20 Qualifier tournament in Scotland. In November 2019, she was named in Bangladesh's squad for the cricket tournament at the 2019 South Asian Games. The Bangladesh team beat Sri Lanka by two runs in the final to win the gold medal. In January 2020, she was named in Bangladesh's squad for the 2020 ICC Women's T20 World Cup in Australia.

In November 2021, she was named in Bangladesh's team for the 2021 Women's Cricket World Cup Qualifier tournament in Zimbabwe. In January 2022, she was named as one of three reserve players in Bangladesh's team for the 2022 Commonwealth Games Cricket Qualifier tournament in Malaysia. Later the same month, she was named in Bangladesh's team for the 2022 Women's Cricket World Cup in New Zealand.

She was named in the Bangladesh squad for the 2024 ICC Women's T20 World Cup.

In January 2025, she took an indefinite break from international cricket, later attributing her decision to an abusive national team environment.
