= Carey–Bairstow stumping =

2023 cricket match incident

Carey-Bairstow stumping

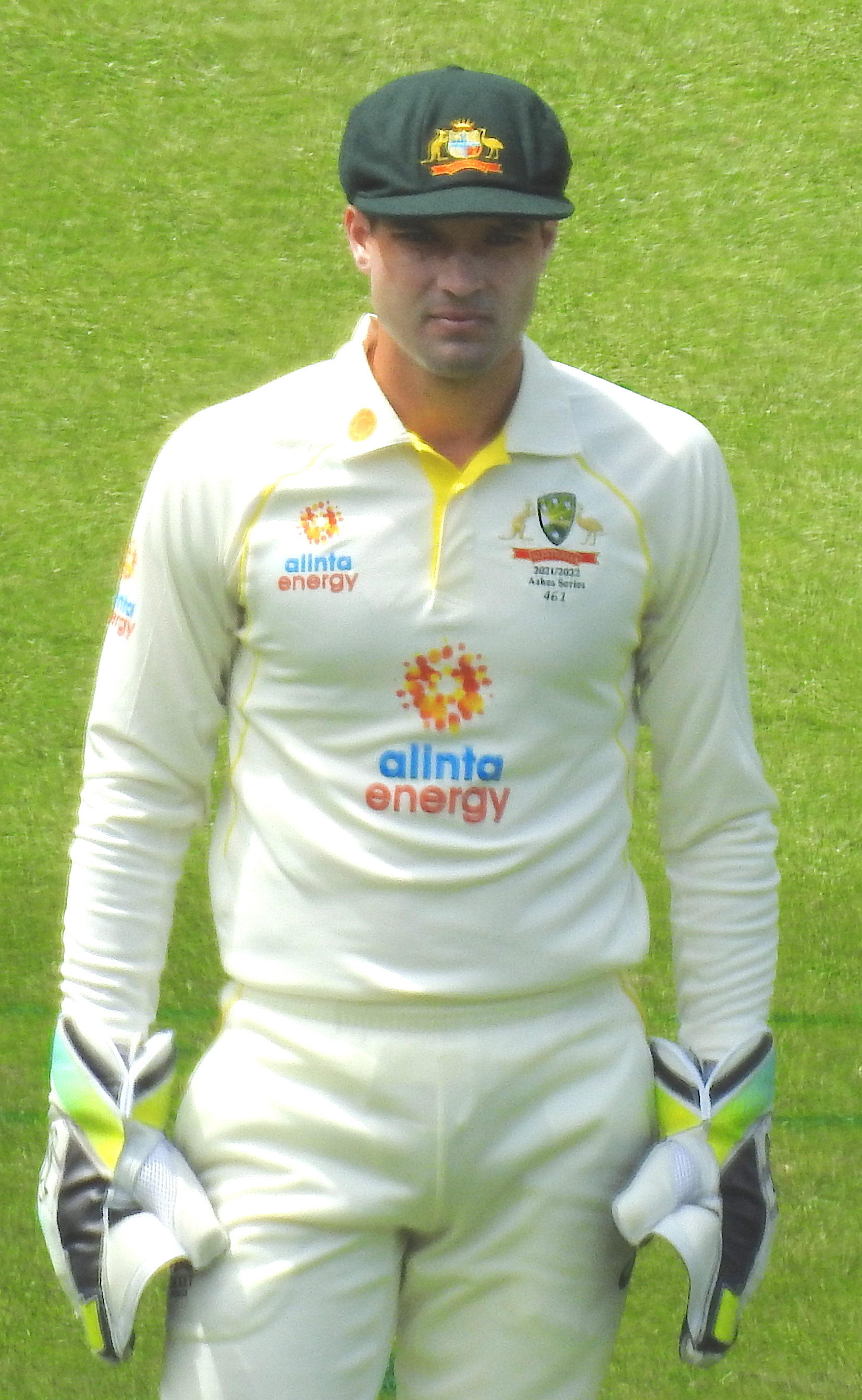
Alex Carey (pictured in 2021) was the Australian wicketkeeper during the match

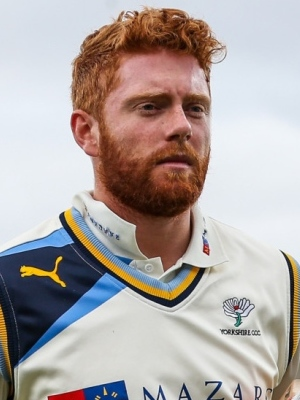
Jonny Bairstow (pictured in 2015) was the England batsman dismissed

On 2 July, on the final day of the second Test cricket match of the 2023 Ashes series between Australia and England, Australian wicketkeeper Alex Carey stumped English batsman Jonny Bairstow at the end of the over, who had been determined by third umpire Marais Erasmus to have left his crease early before the umpire had given the signal to end the over. The English players and fans were extremely displeased with the dismissal, stating it was not "the spirit of cricket." The Australian reaction was unsympathetic to England's furore, arguing that Bairstow was still 'fair game' and was not concentrating on what was happening around him, and the dismissal was within the rules of the game. Bairstow's decision to walk out of his crease was criticised by former English, Australian and international players, most of whom described it as "dozy."

The incident sparked debates across the cricketing world over what constitutes "the spirit of cricket" versus the recorded laws of the game. It also led to the England crowd becoming unprecedentedly hostile towards the entire Australian team, with negative incidents involving England supporters towards the Australian team occurring at both the Marylebone Cricket Club (MCC) members' Long Room at Lord's and at Headingley, the next Test match after the stumping. Most vitriol was directed at Carey, along with Australian vice-captain Steve Smith, prompting extra security measures for the Australian team for the final two Tests in Leeds and London. It was also documented in Amazon Prime's series The Test, which followed the Australian men's cricket team throughout the series, revealing that the idea to execute Bairstow's dismissal came from Australian captain Pat Cummins.

== The incident ==
=== The build-up ===
Day four of the Test match, the day beginning with Usman Khawaja and Steve Smith batting for Australia controlling the momentum, which included Smith three boundaries in a row against England bowler James Anderson. England would change strategies and begin bowling shorter deliveries, which helped turn their day around, including a period they achieved 3 wickets for 10 runs, eventually bowling all of Australia out and leaving England needing 371 runs to win. This innings also included an injured Nathan Lyon coming out to bat, adding 35 runs to Australia's total. England's innings began with Australia's Cameron Green dropping a catch that could have had England opener Ben Duckett out for a duck.

After four of their batters, Zak Crawley, Ollie Pope, Joe Root and Harry Brook, had been dismissed; England's run chase saw Australian Mitchell Starc catch a ball hit by Duckett, who had just scored a half-century, only for the decision to be ruled controversially as not out. Third umpire Marais Erasmus called Duckett back after he had determined that Starc had slid the ball onto the grass, which he adjudicated to not have been in control of the ball. This added tension to the environment, which had continued to build throughout the match, and the decision to give the catch not out was polarising amongst both Australian and English players and pundits, with former Australian bowler Glenn McGrath believing it was out, while former England captain Michael Vaughan agreed with Erasmus' decision. England would end the day 257 runs short of victory, with only six wickets in hand after Duckett was dismissed, leaving Jonny Bairstow and captain Ben Stokes as the batters at the crease.

=== The stumping ===
On the fifth and final day of the match on 2 July 2023, in the 52nd over of England's second innings, Cameron Green came on to bowl for Australia. Green bowled a bouncer on the final ball of the over, which Jonny Bairstow ducked under. After Green had passed him by, Bairstow immediately started to walk towards his captain and batting partner, Ben Stokes. Just over a second later, Australian wicketkeeper Alex Carey, who still had possession of the ball, threw it into the stumps once Bairstow had left his crease and appealed for the wicket, as on-field umpire Ahsan Raza had not yet called the over as completed.

Raza and fellow on-field umpire, Chris Gaffaney, had both missed the dismissal, thus referred the decision to third umpire Marais Erasmus to determine whether the ball was declared dead at the time of Carey hitting the stumps. Erasmus, on watching the video replay, determined that the ball had still been live, and neither Gaffaney nor Raza had signalled the end of the over, declaring Bairstow to be out. The decision drew the immediate ire of England captain Stokes, who was seen angrily yelling words towards the Australian players while boos slowly began to sound out across the Lord's ground.

The Lord's crowd, known for being welcoming and respectful of all opponents playing, began to turn hostile, with a chorus of booing drowning out the sound generated at the ground. England bowler, Stuart Broad, was next to bat, and was visibly aggrieved at the decision, as he and Stokes continued to fire up the England fans over the controversial stumping. Broad began his innings by approaching Carey, Cummins and Marnus Labuschagne. His words to Carey in particular were heard on the stump microphone on the Sky Sports broadcast as, "That's all you're ever going to be remembered for, that." Additionally, Broad was also picked up on the stump microphone, saying to Cummins that the stumping was "the worst thing he had seen on a cricket field".

For the rest of the day, the England fans in the crowd continuously chanted, "Same-old Aussies, always cheating," in protest for the Australian team not withdrawing their appeal. Stokes went on to score 155 runs but was bowled out by Josh Hazlewood with England still needing 70 runs to win. When Australia eventually won the match by bowling England out for 327, the crowd loudly booed.

== Aftermath ==
=== Lord's Long Room ===
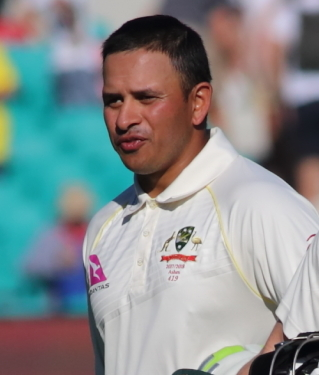
Australian batsman Usman Khawaja was involved in a confrontation with Lord's members while the Australian team walked through to their dressing room. Khawaja subsequently criticised the Lord's members for their behaviour

When the Australian team walked through the Long Room on the way to their changing rooms in the pavilion, the Lord's members made their displeasure with Bairstow's dismissal known, with some of them audibly chanting "cheats, cheats, cheats", along with profanities as the Australian team continued to walk past them. In the process, some Lord's members specifically singled out Australian batsman Usman Khawaja, despite Khawaja having no part in the incident and doing nothing to provoke the Lord's members when walking through the Long Room. David Warner was then seen joining Khawaja in the confrontation with the Lord's members before both received assistance from security, as well as umpire Chris Gaffaney, and were ushered away from the room. There were also reports that members had also attempted to trip Warner and Australian vice-captain Steve Smith while they were walking past. Additionally, the abuse towards the Australian team continued on the stairwell leading to their dressing room where additional members were standing, with Matt Renshaw seen on television cameras laughing and pointing towards members who were yelling at the team while they walked up the stairs. After the altercation, the Australian coaches notified the Marylebone Cricket Club (MCC), who are the custodians of the Lord's venue, that players had been "physically contacted" while walking through the Long Room and asked it to investigate, which the MCC accepted immediately.

Khawaja stated that "disrespectful" language had been directed at him while walking through the room, and that the member's behaviour was "really disappointing." Khawaja stated that his feelings on the Lord's ground had been tainted, stating it was usually one of his "favourite" grounds to attend and play at and the members were usually appreciative of their opposition, their usual appreciative nature was not present after the dismissal. When the documentary The Test was released in May 2024, Australian batsman Marcus Harris was seen being critical of the hypocrisy of the MCC members in the Long Room for being upset over rules, despite being the custodians of the rules of cricket, and was seen exclaiming, "You write the laws you (expletive) idiots." Former England captain David Gower heavily criticised the members for their behaviour, criticising them for threatening Khawaja, despite his reputation for being friendly amongst the cricket community and having no involvement in the dismissal. Gower also criticised the "pack mentality" that had developed from the hostile environment the dismissal had generated.

Later that evening, MCC chief executive Guy Lavender announced that three members involved in the altercation had their memberships suspended and would not be allowed to return to the ground until the investigation into the altercation with Khawaja concluded. The MCC had also issued an apology to Cricket Australia for the incident, took responsibility for the altercation and condemned the behaviour of the members involved. The MCC had also apologised privately to the Australian team before the press conference and was also disgusted at the way their members had behaved, as confirmed by Australian captain Pat Cummins. Cummins stated that he wouldn't be surprised if the MCC stripped the memberships of the members involved with the altercation, with Cummins describing their behaviour as "quite aggressive and abusive."

Five days after the confrontation, MCC chairman Bruce Carnegie-Brown released a statement revealing that after having viewed the security camera footage, the behaviour of the members "bought shame on (the) MCC." It was announced that the roped area that the players walk through would be expanded to prevent members from blocking players from accessing the dressing rooms. Additionally, members were no longer allowed to stand on the staircase leading to the dressing rooms, and people were no longer allowed to use phone cameras in the area. Carnegie-Brown also put out a plea for any other evidence or information from other witnesses to come forward. Three members were ultimately charged, with one member banned for life, another banned for four-and-a-half years, and another banned for two-and-a-half years.

=== English reaction ===
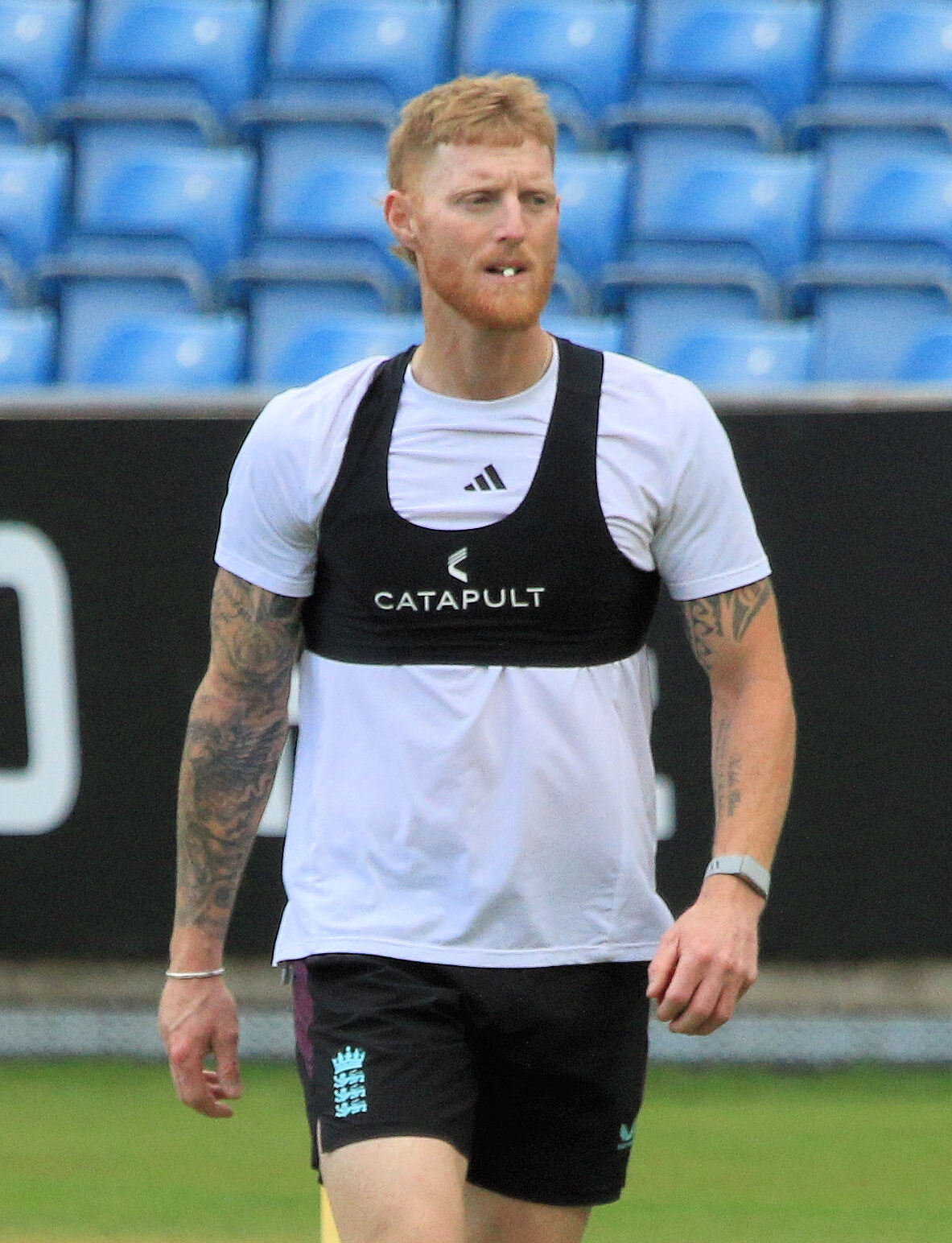
Ben Stokes (pictured in 2025) was England's captain during the 2023 Ashes series and was batting alongside Bairstow when the stumping occurred

When England captain Ben Stokes was asked about his viewpoint on the dismissal, he replied, "I am not disputing the fact it is out because it is out. Would I want to win a game in that manner? The answer for me is no." Stokes also said that if he were in the position that the Australian team were in, he would have withdrawn the appeal, thereby rendering the wicket void. When asked about whether the stumping controversy would impact the relationships between the two teams, England coach Brendon McCullum replied, "I can't imagine we'll be having a beer with them any time soon." McCullum said that the stumping had instead fired up the England team, and that the stumping would negatively affect the Australian team heading into the final three tests.

England bowler Stuart Broad, who was sent to bat at the crease after the stumping, said that he was in disbelief that no Australian player had challenged the decision to withdraw the appeal when he asked them about it during the match and all the Australian players had agreed with the decision. He believed that Australia would feel remorse in not withdrawing the appeal, citing that it could have helped rehabilitate their image after Sandpapergate in 2018, along with their recent efforts to change their team culture in its aftermath. Broad added that he personally felt no ill will towards Australian captain Pat Cummins and believed that Cummins might eventually regret not calling Bairstow back to the crease.

Some of the English media and commentators were furious with the stumping, with publications Mirror Sport, Daily Star and The Telegraph, all siding with the perspective of Stokes and McCullum. Jonathan Agnew disagreed with the Bairstow dismissal and the fairness of it, believing that Australia should have given Bairstow a warning beforehand and executing it if he did it again. Former England cricketer Michael Vaughan, writing for both The Telegraph in the United Kingdom and Australian newspaper The Sydney Morning Herald, argued that although he agreed with the decision to give Bairstow out, calling his actions "dozy" for not looking around to check his surroundings, he felt that Australia should not have gone ahead with the appeal. Former England captain Alastair Cook compared the dismissal to the mankad, feeling that the Australian team should have warned Bairstow beforehand.

Former England and Ireland captain, Eoin Morgan, agreed with Erasmus' decision and could not understand why the England supporters were frustrated with the decision, also criticising Bairstow's lapse of concentration. Former England captain, Andrew Strauss, also agreed with the dismissal decision, adding that "the crowd will see it through English patriotic eyes." Former England players Ian Bell and Michael Atherton also agreed that the Australians' decision to appeal for the wicket was fair and that the fault was solely Bairstow's. Although Bell was unsure whether the Australians appeal should have been withdrawn when considering the reaction from the crowd afterwards. Like Vaughan, both Strauss and Atherton called Bairstow's actions "dozy." Cook additionally called Bairstow "dopey" for not looking at his surroundings.

=== Australian perspective ===
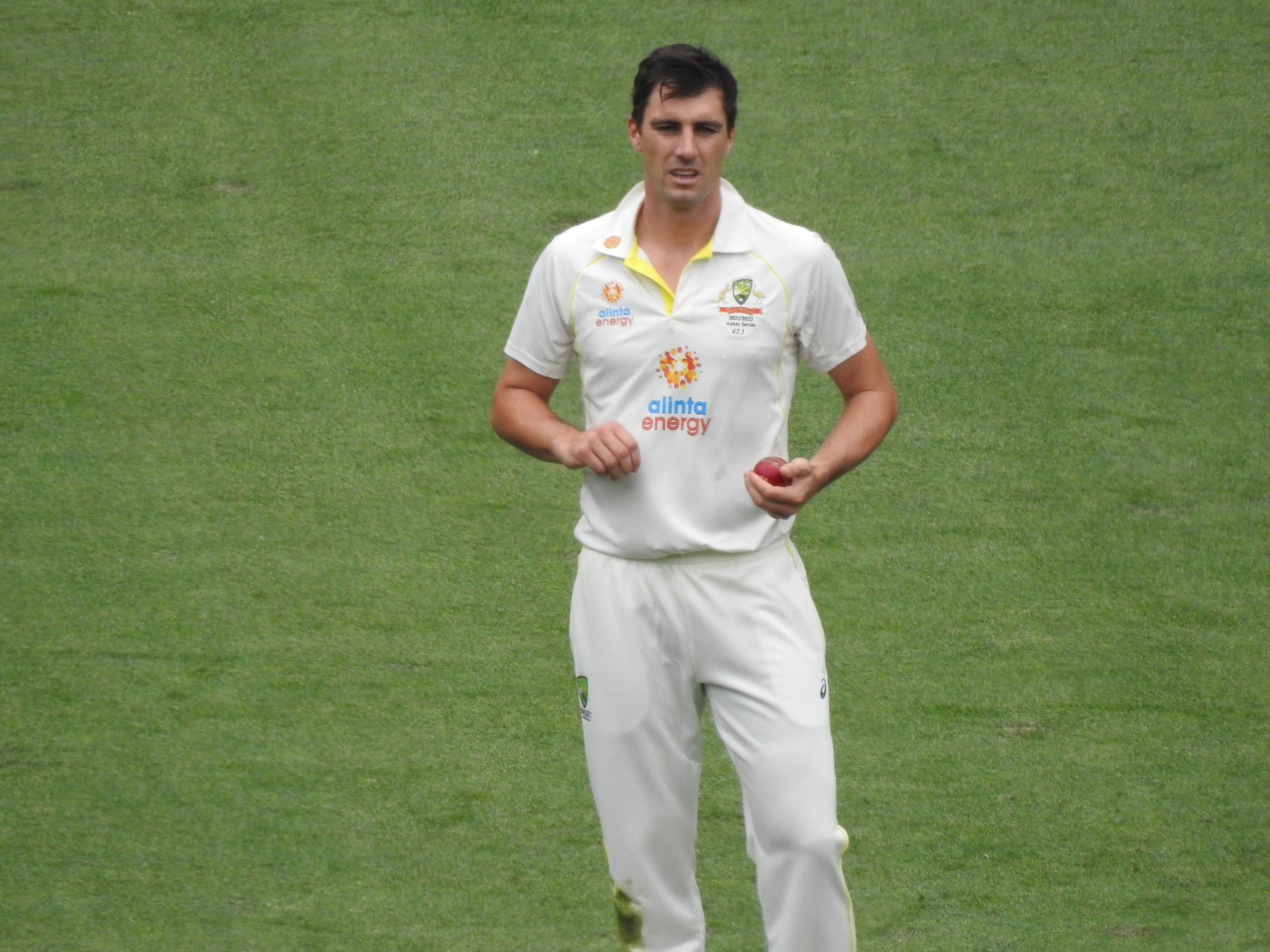
Australian captain Pat Cummins (pictured in 2021), supported the decision to give Bairstow 'out' and defended Carey's actions. It was later revealed that it was Cummins who thought of the idea to dismiss Bairstow

Australian captain Pat Cummins was interviewed by Sky Sports after winning the match, saying the stumping was "totally fair play. That's how the rule is." Alex Carey had no regrets over the dismissal and said he would repeat the dismissal again if it were a different batsman in the same situation. Cummins and Carey had revealed that they both noticed Bairstow leaving his crease early after overs bowled specifically by fast bowlers throughout the innings. This observation prompted the idea to execute the dismissal when Bairstow left his crease early again at the end of Cameron Green's over. Cummins had said he had witnessed Bairstow attempt the same type of stumping himself on Steve Smith in 2019, arguing that it was a normal thing to do when batters leave their crease early. Australian coach Andrew McDonald backed the decision by Carey and Cummins to commit to the stumping of Bairstow. In contrast to the English team's negative feelings, Cummins and McDonald felt no ill will or bad blood, with McDonald feeling "somewhat disappointed" by McCullum's comments about the situation.

The other Australian players on the squad also backed Carey and Cummins, with Usman Khawaja explaining to Australian broadcaster Channel 9 and comparing the decision today to the decision to give Mitchell Starc's catch on Ben Duckett that was ruled not out by the umpires. Khawaja noted that the Australian team during Starc's catch on Duckett controversially being given 'not out,' accepted and respected the umpire's decision and kept playing. Khawaja also discussed that the umpire's decision needs to be respected, whether it is agreed with or not, stating, "The decision is in the umpire’s hands. If the umpire deems it a dead ball today, it’s a dead ball." Khawaja also heavily criticised the behaviour of Stuart Broad when he entered the ground after the stumping.

Former Australian captain and commentator, Mark Taylor, who was commentating for Sky Sports during the dismissal, agreed with the dismissal and with the decision to give it 'out', although added that "people are going to be unhappy about it." Former Australian umpire, Simon Taufel, also agreed with the decision given by Erasmus, as it was written in the rules. Ricky Ponting said that the fault for the wicket was solely on Bairstow and had paid the price for his decision to leave the crease early. Other former Australian players also came out in support of Carey's stumping of Bairstow, including Merv Hughes and Darren Berry. Berry agreed with Vaughan, Strauss and Atherton, calling Bairstow's actions as "dozy."

By chance, the Australian team happened to be filming the third series of The Test for Amazon Prime, with the production capturing the entire reaction from the Australian team, as well as the behaviour of the England fans in the ground. The footage, released in May 2024, revealed that the team approached the situation, as well as the confrontation with the Lord's members, by laughing while trying to process it. Mitchell Marsh compared the situation in the dressing room to being a child in a school classroom who was laughing in the classroom even though he knew he shouldn't be. It was revealed during the documentary that the idea to stump Bairstow was Cummins' rather than Carey's. When Cummins was asked why he didn't claim the idea earlier, he replied, "The funny thing is, I thought I did."

== The "Spirit of Cricket" debate ==
The rule in question was the MCC Laws of Cricket 20.1.2, which states, “The ball shall be considered to be dead when it is clear to the bowler’s end umpire that the fielding side and both batters at the wicket have ceased to regard it as in play.” While England agreed that Alex Carey's stumping of Jonny Bairstow was legally out, which was admitted by Ben Stokes and Brendon McCullum themselves, McCullum commented, “When you become older and more mature, you realise the game and the spirit of it is something you need to protect.” Stokes had argued that Australia should have withdrawn the appeal, despite it being legally out, a view that Michael Vaughan also held. Brad Hogg was one of the few former Australian cricketers who sided with the English team, believing the stumping to be against the spirit of cricket and that Erasmus should have given it not out.

Indian bowler Ravichandran Ashwin sided with the Australians, writing on his social media pages that strategy must be encouraged and commended, rather than worrying about "the spirit of the game.” Former Sri Lankan captain, Kumar Sangakkara, also sided with the Australians, explaining in an interview with Sky Sport, citing that 'the spirit of cricket' was about, "[playing] the game fairly, play it hard and within the laws;" adding that respecting the decision of the umpires, whether a team agrees or disagrees with the decision, also constitutes as playing in 'the spirit of cricket.' Sangakkara also added that the spirit of cricket changes depending on where you grew up playing the sport, and that no two countries would perceive 'the spirit of cricket' the same way.

Ricky Ponting and Kumar Sangakkara both disagreed with the discourse surrounding whether Australia should have withdrawn the challenge and agreed with Cummins' decision to pursue the appeal. Sangakkara added that if Australia were to withdraw their appeal that it would set a dangerous precedent for cricket matches moving forward. Former umpire Simon Taufel debated the sincerity of the Spirit of Cricket debate, stating on his LinkedIn, that people were misusing 'the spirit of cricket' term as an excuse for not liking a dismissal that takes place in a match despite being legal within the Laws of Cricket. Taufel also criticised "the hypocrisy and lack of consistency" from people within the cricketing world who were putting forth 'the Spirit of Cricket' argument, noting the contrasting reactions by supporters of the previous attempted stumping incident between Bairstow and Marnus Labuschagne, and Mitchell Starc's catch of Ben Duckett being given not out.

UK Prime Minister Rishi Sunak, who had attended the match the day before, released a statement through his spokesperson that said, "The Prime Minister agrees with Ben Stokes. He said he simply wouldn't want to win a game in the manner Australia did." Australian Prime Minister Anthony Albanese replied by telling Sunak to "stay in your crease".

=== Similar dismissals ===
Notably, there had been other dismissals that linked back to MCC Rule 20.1.2, which the 'spirit of cricket' was also brought up in discussion during these incidents, both before and after Carey's stumping of Bairstow. England themselves were accused of hypocrisy regarding their own following of 'the spirit of cricket', due to previous incidents similar to Bairstow's dismissal being conducted by Stuart Broad, and additionally by Bairstow himself, which had circulated around social media after the stumping at Lord's occurred.

England coach Brendon McCullum was accused of hypocrisy by cricket pundits, journalists and fans across the cricketing world, having once completed a similar dismissal on Muttiah Muralitharan during a test match at Christchurch in 2006 when playing for his native New Zealand. (Note: As cited by:) Muralitharan who left his crease to celebrate Sri Lankan teammate Kumar Sangakkara making a century, while McCullum, who was the wicketkeeper at the time, stumped Muralitharan. Then New Zealand captain Stephen Fleming, made the decision to go through with the appeal, meaning that Muralitharan was declared 'out' as the over had not been declared as completed by the umpire. Although unlike Bairstow, Muralitharan's dismissal was given a 'run out' instead of 'stumping.' McCullum did apologise to the Sri Lankan team for the stumping during an MCC Spirit of Cricket lecture in 2016, which McCullum himself referenced when asked by journalists when asked about the comparisons between his stumping of Muralitharan and Carey's stumping of Bairstow. McCullum stating that his feelings on the Muralitharan stumping had changed in the years since and he no longer agreed with his actions.

The spirit of cricket debate continued within international cricket two weeks after the Carey-Bairstow stumping, as Indian wicketkeeper, Ishan Kishan attempted a similar stumping on West Indies batsman Jason Holder, during a Test match at Windsor Park, Dominica. Unlike the incident at Lord's, Holder was immediately given not out, as the umpire had already declared the over to be completed. Fans of both India and the West Indies were displeased with Kishan's actions, given that India already held an overwhelming lead and there was no need for an extra wicket, as India won the match with an extra inning to spare.

== Crowd and fan behaviour ==
As a result of the hostile reaction from the crowd at Lord's after the stumping, the hostile environment continued at unprecedented levels for a series on English soil, with extra police and security implemented at Headingley and The Oval. Additionally, reports of anti-social behaviour among England fans had increased compared with the previous series. England batter Ben Duckett stated that Alex Carey, in particular, was receiving so much vitriol from English fans that the England team made the decision to leave him alone instead of confronting him on the pitch. As Carey stepped onto the crease to bat, the crowd could be heard chanting "Stand up if you hate Carey," and loudly cheered when he was hit on the shoulder by a delivery from Chris Woakes. Duckett also noticed Carey "didn't seem his normal self" when he came out to bat during the fourth test at Headingley, Leeds. Carey contacted Australian cyber police due to death threats being made against him and his family, including serious threats made against his wife and children. Additionally, a handwritten letter addressed to Carey and the whole Australian team was delivered to them when the team arrived at Headingley, with a variety of threats being made against Carey and other players.

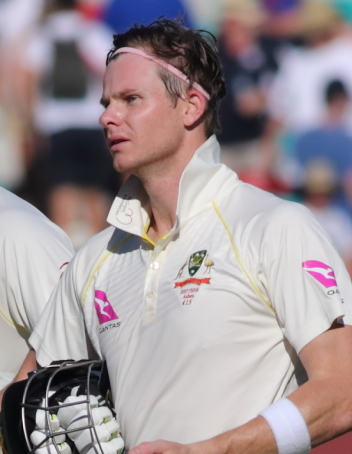
Australian vice-captain Steve Smith (pictured in 2018) was also a frequent target of hostile England supporters, due to his previous involvement in Sandpapergate, as well as his previous success in the 2019 Ashes series on English soil

The crowd abuse had extended to all other members of the Australian squad, with Steve Smith and David Warner targeted in addition to Carey during the fourth test, with their involvement in the 2018 Australian ball-tampering scandal being brought up by the crowd repeatedly. Candice Warner, wife of David, stated Warner himself was unaffected by the chanting and was normalised to it at this point in his career. Former Australian cricketer and long-time commentator Kerry O'Keeffe negatively compared the crowds to football hooliganism. Smith, who achieved his 100th test match appearance at Headingley, was loudly booed as he stepped onto the field to bat, despite pleas from former England captain and commentator Nasser Hussain to instead "stand and applaud" in respect for his achievement. Australian members of the media and ex-players were also targeted by unruly fans across the final three test matches, with Ricky Ponting, who was working for Sky Sports UK, pelted with grapes while broadcasting live on air during the fifth and final test at The Oval in London.

Despite the severity of the crowds actions, England captain Ben Stokes refused to join in the conversation, stating that he felt he should not comment or proclaim how fans should behave when attending a cricket match and did not believe he could give an opinion on the issue. When asked why he wouldn't give an opinion, Stokes replied that, "I’ve been to Australia a few times myself." Stokes would also state that playing in challenging crowd conditions was a routine part of playing cricket and that the crowds in Australia also berated them in the past. Stokes' lack of intervention was criticised by some members of the Australian team who were involved in the confrontation in the Lord's Long Room. Usman Khawaja agreed with Stokes' that the behaviour of the Australian crowd in an Australian home series can be disrespectful towards opposing teams, which he personally condemned. Khawaja would additionally tell the Australian fans to be more courteous of away fans attending the cricket from now on, while also adding that if he was taking his children to the cricket he would not want his children to be surrounded by the behaviour seen by the England fans during the tour.

While Australia had laws in place for people to report anti-social behaviour via a text message, with security given authority to intervene and eject if necessary. England's system contrasted that, with reporters encouraged to seek security face-to-face or on some occasions were given a QR code to download an app and make a complaint, with the main discussions being whether the English system was effective enough.

== Legacy ==
Just over a week after the stumping of Bairstow, Alex Carey was caught up in another controversy with the English media, believed to be a result of the lingering negative effect of the dismissal, having made him the 'villain' of the England fans. Former England captain, Alastair Cook, while appearing on Test Match Special on BBC Radio, alleged that Carey went for a haircut in Leeds, did not pay the barber and left the shop. The barber corroborated Cook's story in an interview with The Sun. Cricket Australia issued a statement denying that this had ever happened and stated that Carey had not had a haircut since he arrived in the country. Australian vice-captain Steve Smith confirmed this statement and criticised The Sun for running the story. Cook subsequently apologised to Carey for spreading the rumour.

Stuart Broad later revealed his remorse about the way he conducted himself during the match at Lord's, particularly the manner in which he spoke about Carey to the media, saying he was "filled with embarrassment" when he rewatched the highlights of the day with his wife. Broad retired from cricket at the conclusion of the fifth test at the Oval, achieving a wicket in his final ever delivery, something Broad considered fortunate when reflecting on his behaviour during the series.

Jonny Bairstow remained quiet on the dismissal throughout the entirety of the series, only addressing it for the first time three months after the incident occurred. On the dismissal itself, Bairstow said that he accepted the umpire's decision, but did not like the manner of how Australia won the match at Lord's. Bairstow defended himself from the criticism received from former England and Australian players as being "dozy," saying that catching a batter unaware was something he had never seen before, and there was a difference between stumping a batter unaware of the umpire and dismissing a batter who was trying to gain an advantage during an over. He also stated that he did not want dismissals similar to what Carey had done becoming commonplace in youth cricket matches.

=== Effect on the 2025–26 Ashes series ===
Due to the hype generated around the incident and the intensity of the series, in addition to the successful series between Australia and India the year before, Cricket Australia announced that ticket sales for the next Ashes series in Australia from November 2025 to January 2026 generated the highest amount of interest in tickets since the 2006–07 Ashes series. Over 60,000 tickets had been sold on pre-sale from travel groups before going live to the general public in June 2025. As the tickets became available, it was reported that the ticket sale demand had been on par with Taylor Swift's The Eras Tour in Australia the previous year. By October 2025, over 700,000 tickets had been sold across the five tests, as well as the One-Day and Twenty20 series against India. The Boxing Day Test in Melbourne was completely sold out, along with the first three days in Brisbane, and the first two days in Adelaide and Perth. Meanwhile, the Sydney test had sold 99% of tickets.

In the lead-up to the third test in Adelaide during the 2025–26 Ashes series, Cricket Australia released an advertisement campaign that highlighted the stumping, which used the original footage of the stumping, as well as a voiceover by Alex Carey, and the use of the Hunters & Collectors 1987 song "Do You See What I See?" playing throughout. The advertisement was criticised by some members of the English fanbase, who called it uncreative and boring. Cricket Australia released a statement defending the decision to use it and did not issue an apology, citing the stumping as being a key component of the increase of ticket sales for the series at home.

The next Ashes series in 2025–26 was Alex Carey's most successful Test series of his career. He also scored a century against England for the first time in his career during the 3rd Test in Adelaide. In the lead up to the series, Carey said that despite struggling with the initial attention and aftermath, he had come to terms with the uproar and the moment it created. He highlighted his experiences growing up and watching the Ashes and his dream of wanting to be part of a history-making moment, as well as the recent 2024–25 series against India at home, as being the key memories and moments that helped him once he began playing for Australia after the dismissal had occurred.

With the hostile English crowd being highly criticised, the Barmy Army made a statement that their procedures had changed for the Perth test in 2025–26 Ashes series, with boos and chants directed at Carey off-limits. When Carey was asked about his feelings on the lack of chanting towards him, he replied that he felt the lack of booing and songs directed at him would be short-lived. However, the Barmy Army also stated that the chanting against the Australian team would continue, with managing director Chris Millward calling the Barmy Army songs and chants "a right of passage" and that having a Barmy Army song is considered a complement on a player's cricketing prowess.

== See also ==
- English cricket team in Australia in 1932–33 – Known as the Bodyline series, due to controversial tactics employed by England's bowlers to prevent Australian batsman Don Bradman from scoring runs
- Underarm bowling incident of 1981 – controversy involving the Australian men's One-Day cricket team bowling underarm to prevent New Zealand from winning the match on the final ball
- 2018 Australian ball-tampering scandal – involving the Australian men's cricket team in a test match against South Africa, who used sandpaper to attempt to tamper the ball
