= Bangladesh women's cricket team in Ireland in 2018 =

	Ireland women	Bangladesh women
- Dates: 28 June – 1 July 2018
Captains	Laura Delany	Salma Khatun

Twenty20 International series
- Results: Bangladesh women won the 3-match series 2–1
Most runs	Laura Delany (88)	Fargana Hoque (115)
Most wickets	Eimear Richardson (4)	Jahanara Alam (7)
- Player of the series: Jahanara Alam (Ban)

The Bangladesh women's cricket team played the Ireland women's cricket team in June and July 2018. The tour consisted of three Women's Twenty20 International (WT20I) matches. The second match took place before the men's Twenty20 International match between Ireland and India which was played later the same day at the same venue.

In the opening match, Jahanara Alam became the first woman for Bangladesh to take a five-wicket haul in international cricket. Bangladesh won the opening two matches, therefore winning the series with one game to play. Bangladesh won the series 2–1 with Jahanara Alam named as the player of the series.

== Squads ==
Ireland	Bangladesh
Laura Delany (c); Kim Garth; Cecelia Joyce; Isobel Joyce; Shauna Kavanagh; Gaby Lewis; Lara Maritz; Ciara Metcalfe; Cara Murray; Orla Prendergast; Eimear Richardson; Clare Shillington; Rebecca Stokell; Mary Waldron	Salma Khatun (c); Rumana Ahmed; Nahida Akter; Jahanara Alam; Lily Rani Biswas; Panna Ghosh; Fargana Hoque; Sanjida Islam; Fahima Khatun; Khadija Tul Kubra; Ayasha Rahman; Nigar Sultana; Shamima Sultana (wk); Sharmin Sultana

Bangladesh also named Jannatul Ferdus, Lata Mondal, Murshida Khatun and Suraiya Azmin as players on standby for the series.

== WT20I series ==
=== 1st WT20I ===
28 June 2018
14:00
Scorecard

Ireland; 134/7 (20 overs)	v	Bangladesh; 135/6 (20 overs)
Isobel Joyce 41 (41); Jahanara Alam 5/28 (4 overs)		Nigar Sultana 46 (38); Eimear Richardson 2/20 (4 overs)

Bangladesh Women won by 4 wickets
YMCA Cricket Club, Dublin
Umpires: Roland Black (Ire) and Alan Neill (Ire)

- Bangladesh Women won the toss and elected to field.
- Jahanara Alam became the first bowler for Bangladesh to take a five-wicket haul in WT20Is.

=== 2nd WT20I ===
29 June 2018
11:00
Scorecard

Ireland; 124/8 (20 overs)	v	Bangladesh; 125/6 (19.1 overs)
Cecelia Joyce 60 (47); Jahanara Alam 2/15 (4 overs)		Shamima Sultana 51 (49); Laura Delany 2/21 (4 overs)

Bangladesh Women won by 4 wickets
The Village, Malahide
Umpires: Azam Baig (Ire) and Paul Reynolds (Ire)

- Ireland Women won the toss and elected to bat.

=== 3rd WT20I ===
1 July 2018
14:00
Scorecard

Bangladesh; 151/4 (20 overs)	v	Ireland; 152/4 (20 overs)
Fargana Hoque 66 (47); Laura Delany 1/19 (4 overs)		Gaby Lewis 50 (31); Nahida Akter 1/20 (4 overs)

Ireland Women won by 6 wickets
Sydney Parade, Dublin
Umpires: Azam Baig (Ire) and Paul Reynolds (Ire)

- Ireland Women won the toss and elected to field.
