= Ashton Turner =

Australian cricketer

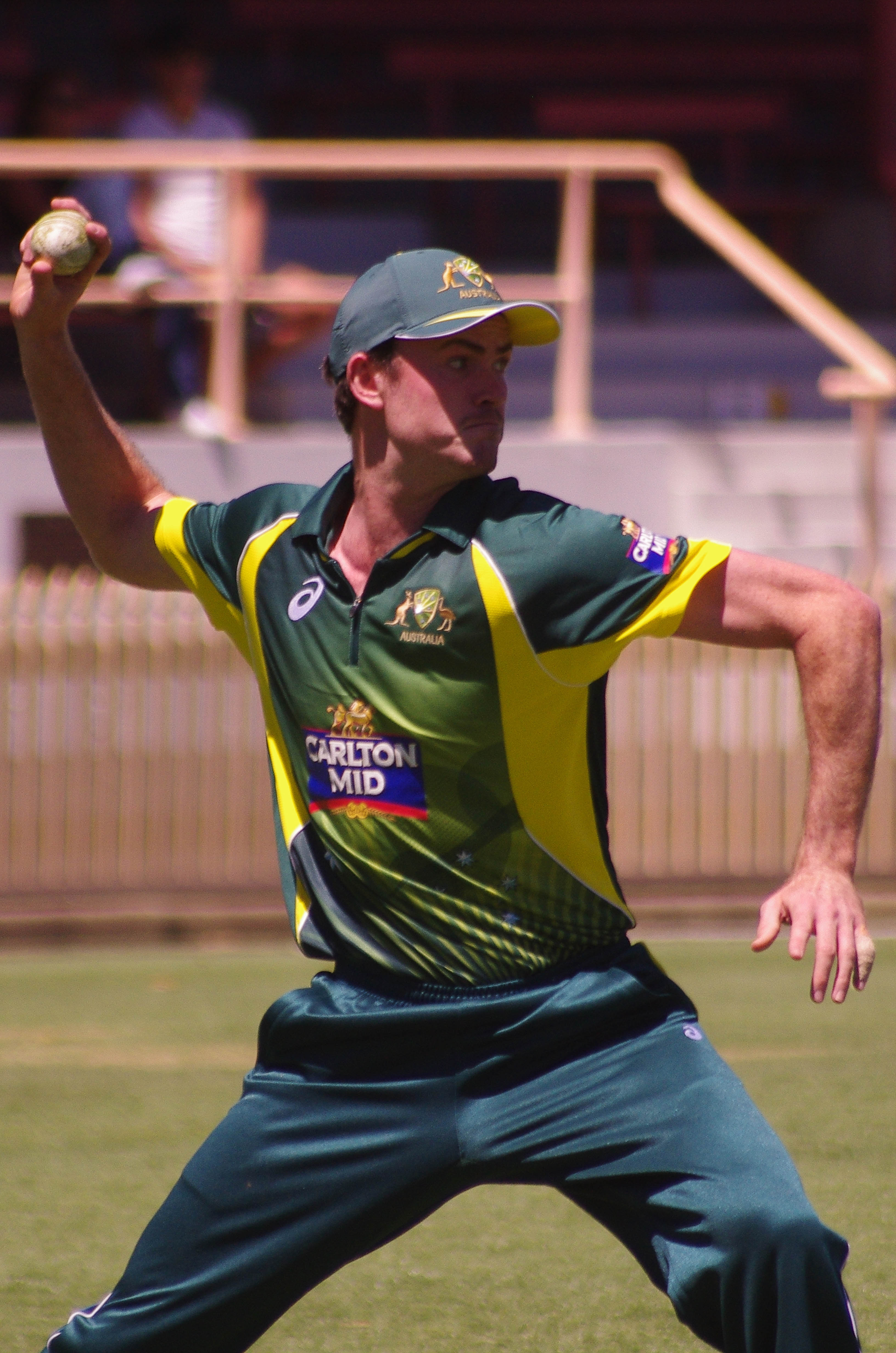
- Turner in November 2014

Personal information
- Full name: Ashton James Turner
- Born: 25 January 1993 (age 33); Perth, Western Australia, Australia
- Height: 1.91 m (6 ft 3 in)
- Batting: Right-handed
- Bowling: Right-arm off break
- Role: Middle-order batter

International information
- National side: Australia (2017–2023)
- ODI debut (cap 228): 2 March 2019 v India
- Last ODI: 26 July 2021 v West Indies
- T20I debut (cap 86): 17 February 2017 v Sri Lanka
- Last T20I: 3 September 2023 v South Africa
- T20I shirt no.: 70

Domestic team information
- Years: Team
- 2012/13–present: Western Australia (squad no. 17)
- 2013/14–present: Perth Scorchers (squad no. 17)
- 2019: Rajasthan Royals (squad no. 70)
- 2022–2024: Durham
- 2022–2023: Manchester Originals
- 2024: Lucknow Super Giants
- 2025: Lancashire
- 2025: London Spirit (squad no. 70)
- 2025–present: Multan Sultans (squad no. 70)
- 2026: Leicestershire

Career statistics
Competition	ODI	T20I	FC	LA
Matches	9	19	60	84
Runs scored	192	110	3,185	2,102
Batting average	32.00	12.22	37.03	33.36
100s/50s	0/1	0/0	7/13	1/12
Top score	84*	24*	154	100
Balls bowled	84	78	1,130	649
Wickets	2	4	12	16
Bowling average	30.00	20.50	50.91	38.62
5 wickets in innings	0	0	1	0
10 wickets in match	0	0	0	0
Best bowling	1/23	2/12	6/111	2/14
Catches/stumpings	4/–	7/–	68/–	43/–
- Source: ESPNcricinfo, 25 October 2026

Ashton James Turner (born 25 January 1993) is an Australian cricketer who debuted for Western Australia during the 2012–13 season, and is also contracted to the Perth Scorchers. From Perth, Turner represented Western Australia at under-15 (schoolboys), under-17 and under-19 level. and captained the under-17 team to their National Championships win. A right-arm off spinner, he toured India with the Australian under-19 team in September and October 2011, taking eight wickets from six matches in a quadrangular tournament involving the Australian, Indian, Sri Lankan, and West Indian under-19 teams. At the 2012 Under-19 World Cup, he was Australia's first-choice spinner, ahead of Victoria's Ashton Agar, (Agar was injured and did not play in the World Cup) and took eleven wickets from six matches, with his best figures 4/28 against Nepal.

== Early and domestic career ==
At state level, Turner was awarded a rookie contract with the Western Australian Cricket Association (WACA) for the 2012–13 season. In December 2012, he was selected in composite teams for two matches against touring international teams, playing for the Prime Minister's XI against the West Indies where he picked up the wicket of captain Darren Sammy and the Cricket Australia Chairman's XI against Sri Lanka. After good form in these matches and at lower levels, Turner was selected to make his List A debut for WA, taking 1/32 and scoring a half-century, 51 runs, against Tasmania towards the end of the 2012–13 season of the limited-overs Ryobi One-Day Cup. At grade cricket level, Turner plays for the Fremantle District Cricket Club, having made his first-grade debut aged 16.

As part of a development program organised by Cricket Australia and Hampshire County Cricket Club, six players were selected to spend the 2013 Australian winter playing for English club teams, with Turner playing for Chichester Priory Park in the Sussex Cricket League. The players also spent time training with the Australian national cricket team during the ongoing Ashes series. While in England, Turner was selected to make his first-class debut in July 2013 in a tour match for the Australians against Sussex, although he did not take a wicket from four overs on debut. Turner joined English Lancashire League club Todmorden as their professional for the 2016 season. In the Moorhouses T20 competition he scored 531 runs (highest score 123*) at an average of 88.5.

Ahead of the 2019–20 Marsh One-Day Cup, Turner was named as one of the six cricketers to watch during the tournament.

== International career ==
In February 2017, Turner was named in Australia's Twenty20 International (T20I) squad for their series against Sri Lanka. He made his T20I debut for Australia against Sri Lanka at the Melbourne Cricket Ground on 17 February 2017. In February 2019, he was named in Australia's One Day International (ODI) squad for their series against India. He made his ODI debut for Australia against India on 2 March 2019 scoring 21 runs off 23 balls. In his second game, he scored an unbeaten 84 off 43 balls to win the player of the match award and help Australia achieve their highest ever successful run chase in ODIs.

== T20 franchise career ==
In December 2018, he was bought by the Rajasthan Royals in the player auction for the 2019 Indian Premier League. He made his IPL debut on 16 April 2019. On 22 April 2019, in the match against the Delhi Capitals, Turner was dismissed without scoring and became the first batsman to make five consecutive ducks in Twenty20 cricket. He was released by the Rajasthan Royals ahead of the 2020 IPL auction.
