= Peter Handscomb =

Australian cricketer

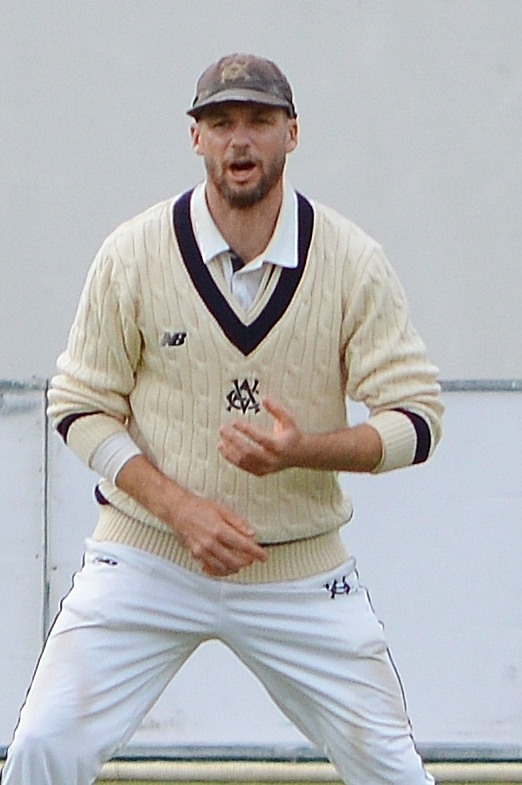
- Handscomb playing First Class cricket with Victoria in October 2025

Personal information
- Full name: Peter Stephen Patrick Handscomb
- Born: 26 April 1991 (age 35); Box Hill, Victoria, Australia
- Nickname: Hank
- Height: 1.83 m (6 ft 0 in)
- Batting: Right-handed
- Bowling: Right-arm off break
- Role: Batter

International information
- National side: Australia (2016–2023)
- Test debut (cap 447): 24 November 2016 v South Africa
- Last Test: 9 March 2023 v India
- ODI debut (cap 219): 19 January 2017 v Pakistan
- Last ODI: 11 July 2019 v England
- ODI shirt no.: 54 (formerly 29)
- T20I debut (cap 94): 24 February 2019 v India
- Last T20I: 27 February 2019 v India
- T20I shirt no.: 54 (formerly 29)

Domestic team information
- Years: Team
- 2011/12–present: Victoria
- 2012/13–2019/20: Melbourne Stars
- 2015: Gloucestershire
- 2016: Rising Pune Supergiants (squad no. 54)
- 2017: Yorkshire (squad no. 54)
- 2019: Durham (squad no. 54)
- 2020/21–2021/22: Hobart Hurricanes (squad no. 54)
- 2021–2022: Middlesex (squad no. 29)
- 2022/23: Melbourne Renegades
- 2023–2025: Leicestershire (squad no. 54)
- 2023/24–2024/25: Melbourne Stars

Career statistics
Competition	Test	ODI	FC	LA
Matches	20	22	216	179
Runs scored	1,079	632	13,349	5,867
Batting average	37.20	33.26	39.14	39.91
100s/50s	2/5	1/4	30/75	9/36
Top score	110	117	281*	140
Catches/stumpings	30/0	14/0	390/11	165/7
- Source: ESPNcricinfo, 25 October 2026

Peter Stephen Patrick Handscomb (born 26 April 1991) is an Australian cricketer who plays for the Victoria cricket team.

He plays as a middle-order batsman and occasional wicketkeeper. Handscomb has played for Australia in Test matches, One Day Internationals and Twenty20 Internationals and plays in the Australian Big Bash League for Melbourne Stars.

== Early life ==
Handscomb was a talented junior tennis player, but eventually chose to pursue cricket. He played for Victoria at both under-17 and under-19 level, and went on to play for the Australian under-19 cricket team during the Sri Lankan under-19 team's tour of Australia in October 2009.

== Domestic career ==
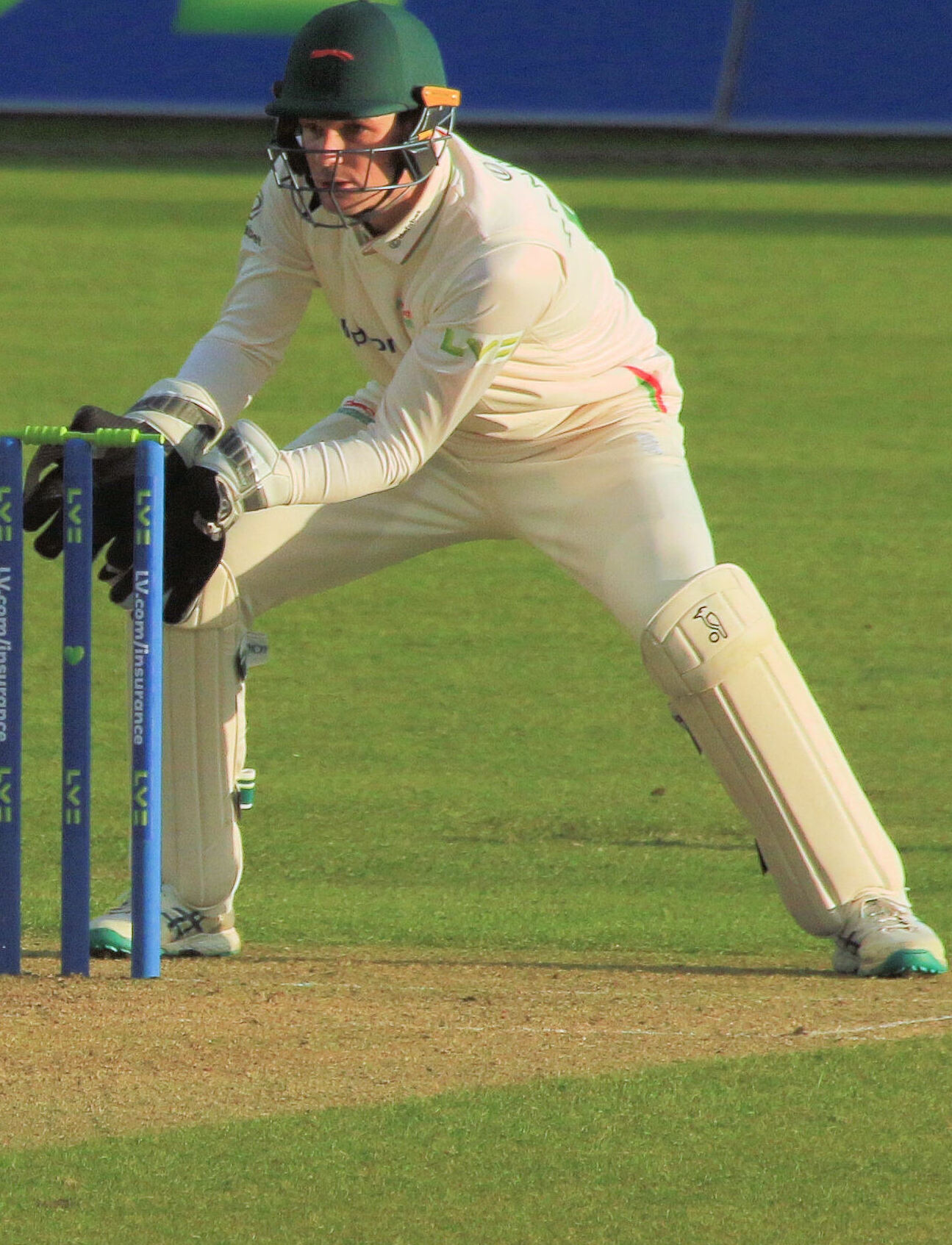
Handscomb keeping wicket for Leicestershire in 2023

Having spent the 2011 season playing English club cricket for Tring Park, as well as several matches for Leicestershire County Cricket Club in the Second XI Championship, Handscomb debuted for Victoria during the 2011–12 Australian season, playing as a top-order batsman. He scored 42 and 71 runs, respectively, in his first List A and first-class cricket innings, both in matches against Queensland at the Gabba. Handscomb's first century in Sheffield Shield matches came against South Australia in February 2012, an innings of 113 runs at the Adelaide Oval. Towards the end of the season, he was also used as Victoria's wicket-keeper, with both Matthew Wade and Ryan Carters unavailable. Handscomb was awarded Cricket Victoria contracts for both Victoria and the Melbourne Stars for the 2012–13 season. In Victorian Premier Cricket, he plays for the St Kilda Cricket Club, and led the club's batting averages during the 2011–12 season. Handscomb also holds British citizenship, with both of his parents English immigrants to Australia.

Handscomb's break-through first class season occurred for Victoria in 2014–15, when he scored three centuries and averaged 53.91. He also made his mark in the Big Bash League playing for Melbourne Stars, scoring an unbeaten century against the Perth Scorchers at the Melbourne Cricket Ground. His century was the first time he had passed a score of 25 in the BBL, and he was the only batsman to pass 20 in his team's three-wicket win. He played county cricket for Gloucestershire during 2015, and began touring with Australia A, becoming captain of the team in early 2016. In August 2019, Handscomb replaced Cameron Bancroft, who had been called up to the Australian squad, in the Durham squad in 2019 Vitality Blast.

He captained Middlesex during the 2021 and 2022 seasons.

In the 2025-26 Sheffield Shield season, Handscomb lead the competition in runs scored with 724 across 11 matches and 21 innings, including 2 centuries.

== International career ==
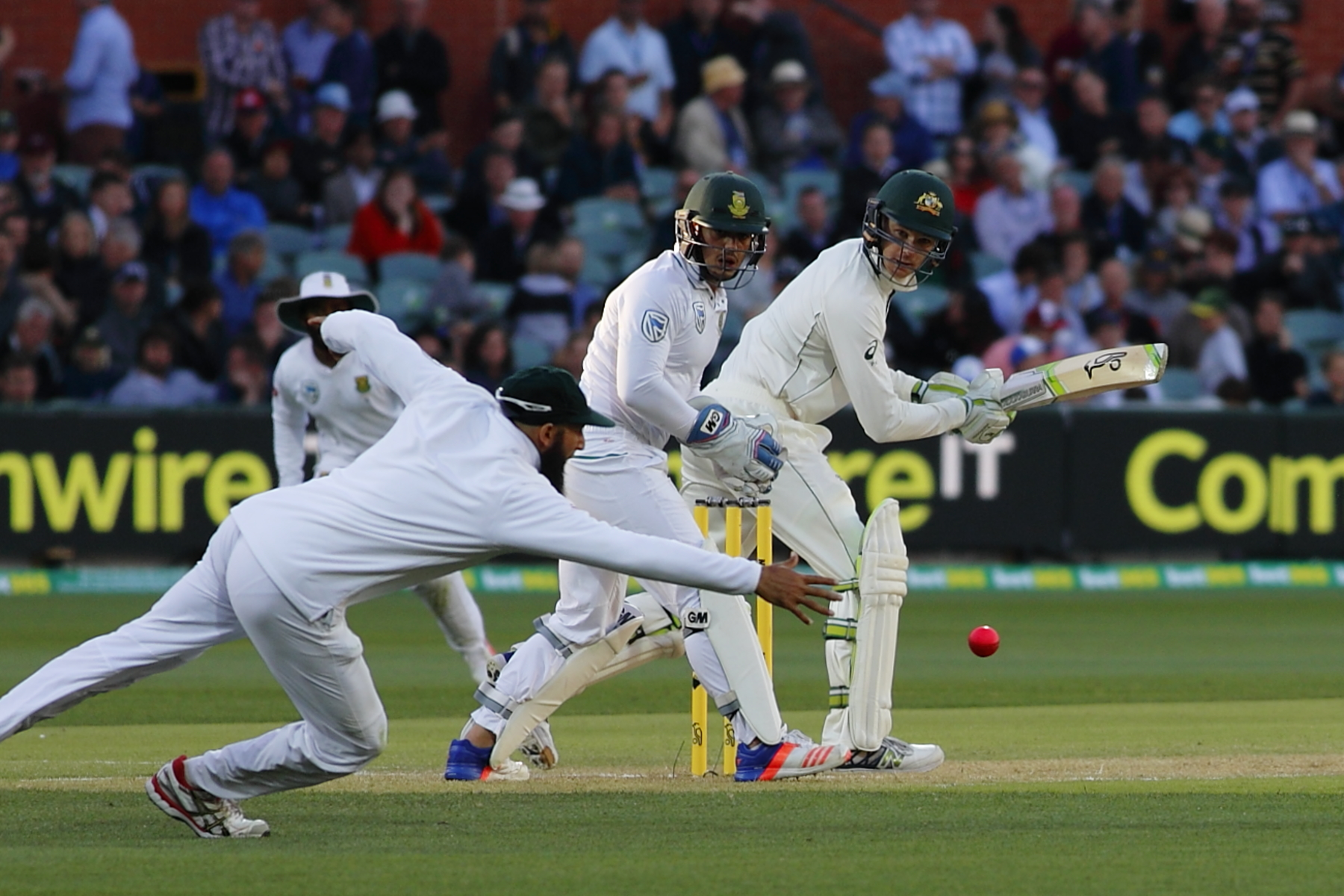
Handscomb on Test debut at the Adelaide Oval against South Africa in 2016

In November 2016, immediately after Handscomb's maiden first-class double century against New South Wales and amidst the backdrop of Australia's disastrous home series loss against South Africa and the retirement of chairman of selectors Rod Marsh, Handscomb was one of several players brought into Australia's Test team ahead of the dead rubber third Test against South Africa. He made his Test debut on 24 November 2016, and was presented his baggy green cap by Chris Rogers.

Batting at number five, Handscomb made an impressive start to his Test career, scoring 399 runs at an average of 99.75 across the remaining four home Tests of the summer: one against South Africa and three against Pakistan. He scored his maiden Test hundred (105) in the first Test against Pakistan at the Gabba, in a 172-run partnership with skipper Steve Smith, and followed it with 110 in the third Test at the Sydney Cricket Ground. Handscomb became the first batsman in history to score his maiden Test century in a Day/Night Test match. With half-centuries in the other two matches, Handscomb became the second Australian Test cricketer to score a half century in each of his first four Tests, and was not dismissed for less than fifty in any innings.

Handscomb was dropped from the Australian team during the 2017-18 Ashes series in Australia. He was recalled when three batmen were suspended due to the 2018 Australian ball-tampering scandal, and played four more tests in 2018 and 2019 before being dropped again.

Handscomb made his One Day Internationals (ODI) debut in Perth on 19 January 2017 against Pakistan, and was presented his ODI cap by Adam Gilchrist. In his debut innings, Handscomb was caught behind for 0, but it was shown that the bowler, Junaid Khan had bowled a no-ball. He went on to score 82 in Australia's successful chase of 264 against Pakistan, the third highest debut score by an Australian in an ODI. On 30 January 2017, Handscomb deputised for Matthew Wade as wicket-keeper against New Zealand.

In April 2018, Handscomb was awarded a national contract by Cricket Australia for the 2018–19 season. In February 2019, he was named in Australia's Twenty20 International (T20I) squad for their series against India. He made his T20I debut for Australia against India on 24 February 2019.

In March 2019, Handscomb scored his first century in an ODI, with 117 against India at Mohali.

In July 2019, Handscomb was added to Australia's squad for the 2019 Cricket World Cup. He replaced Shaun Marsh, who was ruled out of the rest of the tournament with a fractured forearm.

In February 2023, he was selected for the Australian Test team for the first time in four years, playing all four Tests of the Australian tour of India.

== Playing style ==
As a batsman, Handscomb plays very deep in his crease, close to the stumps. While the intention of this technique is to get more time to react to the ball, it makes him vulnerable against pace bowlers with sideways movements (inswingers and off cutters from right-hand bowlers). This issue is further exacerbated by his tendency to change his batting guard during his innings. This issue was exposed during his recall to the Test team in 2018 against India, where Australian legend Shane Warne likened him to a "lamb to the slaughter" and in the 3rd test at the Melbourne Cricket Ground, his home Test, he was dropped from the Test team.
