= Bhuvneshwar Kumar =

Indian cricketer (born 1990)

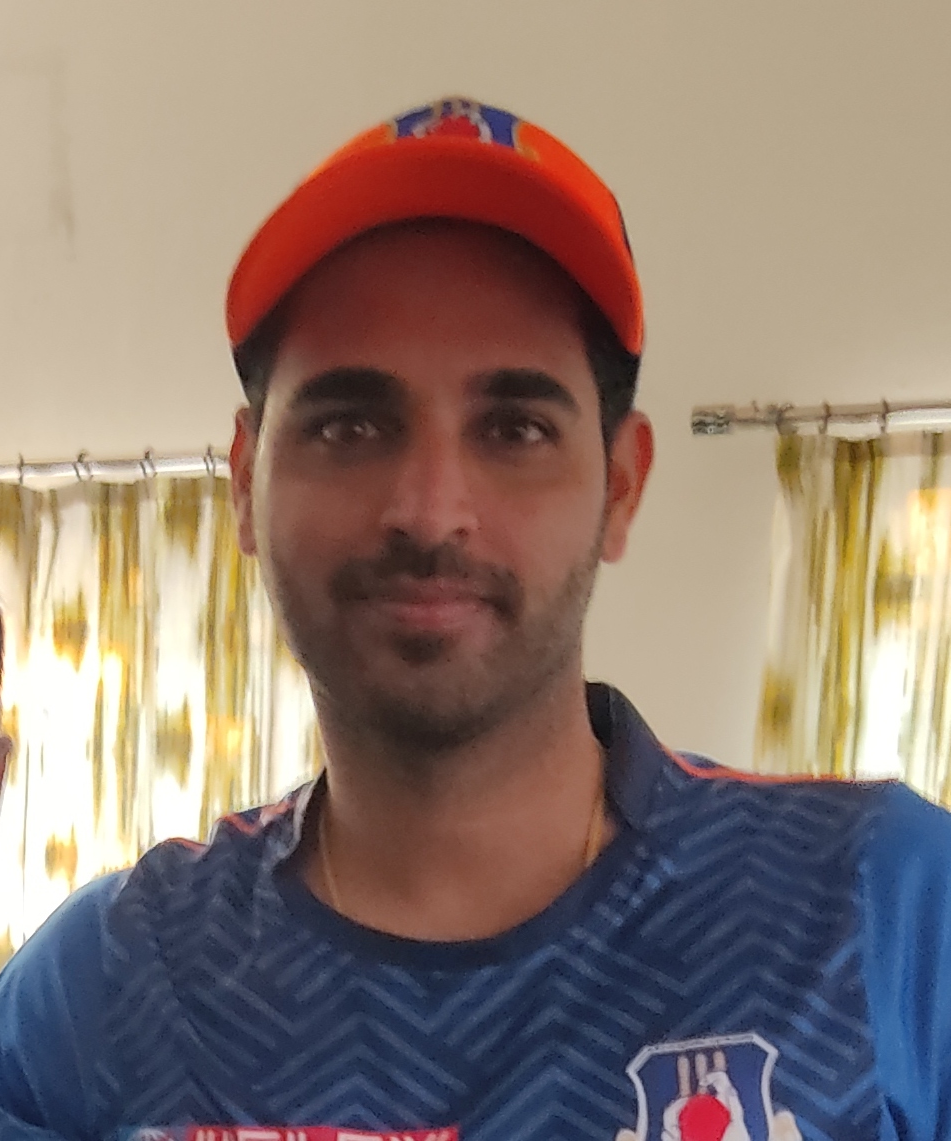
- Kumar in 2024

Personal information
- Full name: Bhuvneshwar Kumar Singh
- Born: 5 February 1990 (age 36); Meerut, Uttar Pradesh, India
- Nickname: Bhuvi, Swing King
- Height: 1.75 m (5 ft 9 in)
- Batting: Right-handed
- Bowling: Right-arm medium
- Role: Bowler

International information
- National side: India (2012–present)
- Test debut (cap 276): 22 February 2013 v Australia
- Last Test: 24 January 2018 v South Africa
- ODI debut (cap 194): 30 December 2012 v Pakistan
- Last ODI: 21 January 2022 v South Africa
- ODI shirt no.: 15
- T20I debut (cap 45): 25 December 2012 v Pakistan
- Last T20I: 24 October 2026 v New Zealand
- T20I shirt no.: 78 (formerly 15)

Domestic team information
- Years: Team
- 2007/08–present: Uttar Pradesh
- 2009–2010, 2025–present: Royal Challengers Bengaluru
- 2011–2013: Pune Warriors
- 2014–2024: Sunrisers Hyderabad

Career statistics
Competition	Test	ODI	T20I	FC
Matches	21	121	87	70
Runs scored	552	552	67	2,433
Batting average	22.08	14.15	8.37	27.03
100s/50s	0/3	0/1	0/0	1/14
Top score	63*	53*	16	128
Balls bowled	3,348	5,847	1,791	12,393
Wickets	63	141	90	218
Bowling average	26.09	35.11	23.10	26.53
5 wickets in innings	4	1	2	13
10 wickets in match	0	0	0	0
Best bowling	6/82	5/42	5/4	8/41
Catches/stumpings	8/–	29/–	15/–	18/–
Medal record
Men's cricket
Representing India
ICC T20 World Cup
Runner-up	2014 Bangladesh
ICC Champions Trophy
Winner	2013 England & Wales
Runner-up	2017 England & Wales
ACC Asia Cup
Winner	2016 Bangladesh
Winner	2018 UAE
- Source: Cricinfo, 15 November 2025

Bhuvneshwar Kumar Singh (born 5 February 1990) is an Indian cricketer who plays for the Indian national team. A right-arm medium bowler, he is known for his ability to effectively swing the ball both ways at will. He represents Uttar Pradesh in domestic cricket and Royal Challengers Bengaluru in the Indian Premier League. Kumar was a member of the Indian squad that won the 2013 Champions Trophy, and the 2016 and 2018 Asia Cup.

He made his international debut in December 2012 against Pakistan, taking three wickets in a Twenty20 International (T20I), including one in his first over. He went on to make his One Day International (ODI) debut in the series which followed, where he took a wicket on his first ball. He is the first Indian bowler to take a five-wicket haul in Test cricket, ODIs and T20Is. He is the only bowler whose first wicket in all three formats of the game was bowled. He was named as ICC Men's Player of the Month award for March 2021. During the 2022 Asia Cup, he was the highest wicket taker with 11 wickets. He is the first bowler to win the IPL Purple Cap in two consecutive seasons.

== Early life ==
Bhuvneshwar Kumar was born on 5 February 1990 in Meerut, Uttar Pradesh. His father, Kiran Pal Singh, was a sub-inspector in the Uttar Pradesh Police. His sister encouraged him to play cricket and took him to his first coaching centre when he was thirteen.

== Domestic career ==
Kumar plays for Uttar Pradesh in domestic cricket; he has also played for Central Zone in the Duleep Trophy and made his first-class debut at the age of 17 against Bengal. In the 2008/09 Ranji Trophy final, he became the first bowler to dismiss Sachin Tendulkar for a duck in first-class cricket.

=== Indian Premier League ===
Following his performances in the 2008/09 Ranji season, he was given an Indian Premier League (IPL) contract by Royal Challengers Bangalore. In 2011, he was signed by Pune Warriors India, but after the team was dissolved in 2013, he was bought by Sunrisers Hyderabad for ₹4.25 crores during the 2014 IPL Auction.

In 2016, he played in Sunrisers' team which won the 2016 Indian Premier League, taking 23 wickets and winning the Purple Cap as the bowler who took most wickets during the season. In 2018, he was named the team's vice-captain.

In the 2022 Indian Premier League mega-auction, Kumar was bought by the Sunrisers Hyderabad for ₹4.20 crores. He was later released by Sunrisers Hyderabad after the 2024 Indian Premier League. In the auctions held in November 2024, Kumar was bought by Royal Challengers Bengaluru for ₹10.75 crores.Kumar took 17 wickets and helped RCB win the title in 2025 with best figures of 3/33 and final figures 2/38.For the 2026 season, he was retained by Royal Challengers Bengaluru for ₹10.75 crores and was the leading wicket-taker for the franchise with 28 wickets in 16 matches.

== International career ==
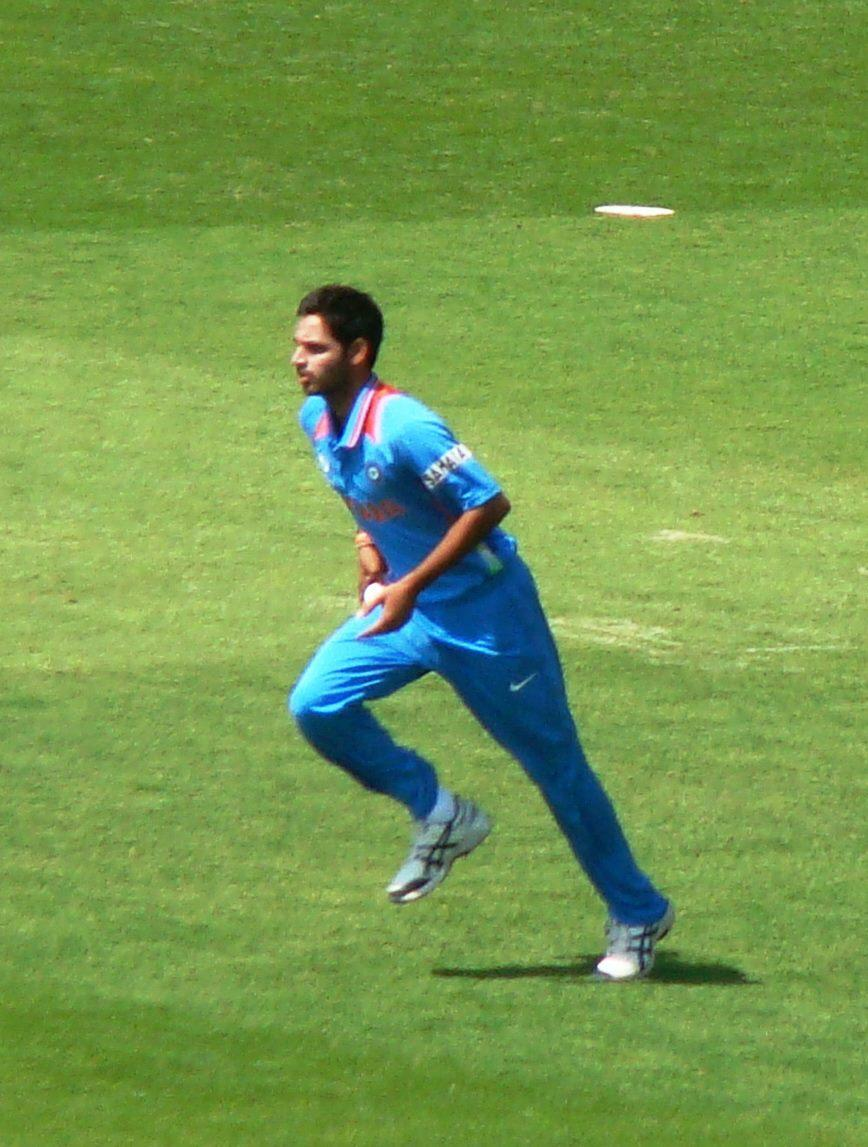
Kumar bowling in 2013

Kumar made his international debut at the end of 2012, playing in T20I and ODI matches against Pakistan. He made his Test debut in 2013 and was part of the Indian team which won the 2013 Champions Trophy. He was named in the Team of the Tournament by the International Cricket Council (ICC).

In July 2013, he posted career-best figures of four wickets for eight runs (4/8) against Sri Lanka in the Tri-Nation tournament. He was the leading wicket taker in the tournament and awarded the Player of the Series.

During the 2014 tour of England, Kumar took new career-best Test match bowling figures of 6/82 at Lord's; he was named the Indian Player of the Series.

In February 2018, he took a five-wicket haul in a T20I against South Africa. He became the second Indian bowler to take 5 wickets in T20Is. In January 2019, in the first ODI against Australia, Kumar took his 100th wicket in ODIs. In April 2019, he was named in India's squad for the 2019 Cricket World Cup but was later ruled out of a number of matches due to a leg injury. In June 2021, he was named India's vice-captain for their ODI and T20I matches against Sri Lanka and in September 2021, Kumar was named in India's squad for the 2021 ICC Men's T20 World Cup.

In June 2022, Kumar was named India's vice-captain for their T20I matches against Ireland.

In October 2026, he made his comeback to international cricket following his inclusion in the T20I squad for the New Zealand series.

== Personal life ==
On 23 November 2017, Kumar married Nupur Nagar in Meerut, Uttar Pradesh. They became parents to a baby girl named Acsah on 24 November 2021.
