= Substitute (cricket) =

Replacement player in cricket

A substitute in the sport of cricket is a replacement player that the umpires allow when a player has been injured or become ill, after the nomination of the players at the start of the game. The rules for substitutes appear in Law 24 of the Laws of Cricket.

== Overview ==
A substitute can act for the injured or ill player in the field, although they may not bowl, bat or act as captain, unless otherwise agreed by the captains. A player may bat, bowl and field even if they have had a substitute for part of the game, though they need to wait for a period equal to their time off the field until they bat or bowl again. Substitutes are generally not listed in the official squad list, unless they were in the starting XI for other games in the wider squad, or were the twelfth player, as some forms of cricket have 12 players listed prior to the match, at which point one player is omitted from the match squad. However, this is not required under the laws, and the substitute can be anyone, providing the umpires approve the use of a substitute. This can lead to members of the crowd, on-site media or a team's coaching staff taking the role. One example being a New Zealand journalist who was following their tour of India in 1988, taking the field.

=== History ===
The use of substitutes is known from the 18th century. In the report of a match on Monday, 5 September 1748, the role is termed a "seeker-out"; this was in the sense that George Smith, who was carrying an injury and had been granted a substitute fielder in previous matches, was denied one in this match. The practice of allowing substitutes was varied and inconsistent in the 19th century. In 1870, a match occurred between the MCC and Nottinghamshire. Substitutes were allowed early in this match, but this was condemned by the press, and by the conclusion of the match they were refused.

The first-ever use of a substitute in first-class cricket occurred in The University Match between Oxford and Cambridge in 1891, when Thomas Case replaced Frederic Thesiger in the Oxford XI, after Thesiger had injured himself while fielding on the first morning of the match.

In 2017 the proscription on substitutes being used to wicket-keep was officially lifted. Prior to that only one of the remaining 10 players would be able to do so. Despite the proscription being within the rules there were rare occasions in high level cricket where with the permission of the opposition captain and the umpires, a substitute was allowed to act as wicket-keeper. An example of this was in a Test match in 1986 where Bob Taylor, who had been retired from test cricket for 2 years, performed the duty as an emergency substitute for Bruce French after he was hurt while batting.

=== Fielding substitutes ===
A substitute is permitted to take catches as with any other fielder, and on some occasions does. The first occasion in Test cricket was in the Test between England and Australia in 1884, when Australia's captain, Billy Murdoch, took a catch from his teammate Tup Scott while playing as a substitute for England. The highest number of catches by a substitute fielder in a Test match is four, a record shared by Gursharan Singh, Younis Khan, Virender Sehwag, and Jackson Bird. However, substitute fielders' catches do not count towards individual stats.

=== Recent changes ===
In recent years, there have been arguments made for cricket to allow substitutes in first-class games, as cricket forbids full substitutes for most injuries or tactical reasons. In 2019, concussion substitutes were allowed in Test matches and other international games for the first time. Arguments in favour of general substitutes have been made from a perspective of improving the game, coping with increasing injury rates due to the modern schedule, to follow the lead of other sports in trying to manage concussion more responsibly and to provide greater opportunities for players to gain experience in first-class cricket. However, there is an equally strong viewpoint that the nature of the first-class contest may be diminished with a summary suggesting that although medical experts would recommend introduction of substitutes the majority of players are still not in favour.

=== Restrictions on returning player ===
When a player leaves the ground due to injury and is replaced by a substitute fielder, they are generally not permitted to return and immediately resume bowling (or batting if their team's innings commences while they are off the field). The injured player is required to spend a period back on the field at least equal to the time that they were absent before resuming bowling, or batting should a change of innings occur. Variations of the time periods required and the circumstances of the players return to the field apply in different forms of the game.

=== Injured bowler ===
If a bowler is injured during an over and cannot complete it, another bowler must bowl the remaining deliveries. The bowler chosen to do so cannot be the bowler who bowled the previous over, and must not bowl the following over either. A substitute fielder may take the place of the injured bowler whilst they are off the field, but they may not bowl.

== Tactical substitute ==
In 2005, the International Cricket Council announced, as part of a package of changes to the playing conditions for One Day Internationals to be trialled over a ten-month period, that tactical substitutions would be permitted. Each team was to be allowed one substitute, who had to be named before the toss was made, and could be introduced at any stage of the match. The ODI series between England and Australia in July saw the first use of these new regulations, which did not apply to other forms of cricket such as Test matches.

This change, however, was widely criticised by players, commentators, and fans. In particular, it was said to give the team that wins the toss an even greater advantage than usual.

In March 2006 players and officials started to rebel against this controversial rule and a One Day International series between South Africa and Australia saw the players agree to boycott the rule. Just a few weeks later the International Cricket Council announced that the rule was being withdrawn, and it is no longer used.

In the 2005 Ashes Test series, Australian captain Ricky Ponting repeatedly complained that England were abusing the substitute system by bringing on specialist fielders who would otherwise have no hope of being in the England team, in place of bowlers with poor fielding skills. This was argued to be against the spirit of cricket as substitute fielders were normally drawn from the unfortunate players within the overall squad that were left out of the match due to their bowling style not matching the wicket, being the backup wicket-keeper or to adjust the mix of bowlers and batsmen in the team. English bowlers were frequently substituted at the end of bowling spells and temporarily replaced with fresh fielders. The England coach Duncan Fletcher argued that these substitutions were either legitimate injuries or players "answering the call of nature" (i.e. using the toilet), but did not address the use of players from outside the England team. The issue came to a climax in the 4th Test, when Ponting was run out by substitute Gary Pratt, causing him to angrily shout and gesticulate in the direction of the England dressing room. At the time, Pratt was on the field for bowler Simon Jones - who was nursing an ankle injury that proved to end his Test career after this match. Pratt was not a legitimate "12th man" however, and instead of being a member of the Test team, he was a "ring in" specialist fielder who had a mediocre professional career as a batsman, and was out of First Class Cricket entirely at the end of the following year at age 25. Ponting was fined 75% of his match fee for dissent.

In 2008, the International Cricket Council tightened the regulations on the use of substitutions, saying "Substitute fielders shall only be permitted in cases of injury, illness or other wholly acceptable reasons... and should not include what is commonly referred to as a 'comfort break'".

== Concussion substitute ==
In the mid-2010s there were calls for concussion substitutes who could bat or bowl to be introduced, with increased awareness of the risks of continuing to play following a concussion. New Zealand introduced such a rule for their domestic limited-overs competitions, having had two concussion-related substitutions in 2016. The England and Wales Cricket Board introduced concussion replacements to English domestic competitions at the start of the 2018 season. The replacements can bat and bowl in place of a player with concussion or suspected concussion; match officials have to determine that the new player is a "like for like" replacement.

In July 2019, the International Cricket Council (ICC) agreed to allow the use of concussion replacements in all international cricket matches from 1 August 2019, with substitute having to be a "like-for-like replacement" and approved by the Match Referee.

=== ICC Playing Conditions ===
- 1.2.8.1 In assessing whether the nominated Concussion Replacement should be considered a like-for-like player, the ICC Match Referee should consider the likely role the concussed player would have played during the remainder of the match, and the normal role that would be performed by the nominated Concussion Replacement.
- 1.2.8.2 If the ICC Match Referee believes that the inclusion of the nominated Concussion Replacement, when performing their normal role, would excessively advantage their team, the Match Referee may impose such conditions upon the identity and involvement of the Concussion Replacement as he/she sees fit, in line with the overriding objective of facilitating a like-for-like replacement for the concussed player.

For example: If David Warner, a pure batsman, is injured in a Test match and Australia name Mitchell Marsh, an all-rounder, as his replacement, then the match-referee has the power to restrict Marsh from bowling in the match.

The rules were implemented for saving a team from having a disadvantage if one of their players suffers a concussion and is out from the match. The rules also restrict a player from taking unnecessary risks by putting their health on the line in a bid to help their team in a match.

Every circumstance is going to be different depending on when the player is requested to be replaced. If a bowler's injured and they've only got a batting innings left then the decision might be different to if the same player was injured and there was a bowling innings left. It's very much around the circumstances around the game and the referees will be given guidelines as will the teams how to interpret those, But it's very much around what is the likely role of the injured player for rest of the match and who is most like-for-like with the role that player will play. The match referee could put conditions on a player being involved. So, if there's an allrounder replacing a batter then he might put a condition that player is unavailable to bowl during the match. The referee has some flexibility to best accommodate a like-for-like replacement.

—Geoff Allardice, ICC General Manager explained before 2019 Ashes series.

=== First usage ===
The first use of such a substitute was during the Second Test at Lord's in the 2019 Ashes series between England and Australia, when Steve Smith was hit on the neck by a bouncer by Jofra Archer in the first innings. He was later diagnosed as having suffered concussion and was ruled out of the remainder of the Test. Marnus Labuschagne was named as the official replacement for Smith and came to bat on the final day of the Test.

On November 1, 2019, the West Indies player Shabika Gajnabi became the first concussion substitute in women's cricket when she replaced Chinelle Henry, who was concussed after hitting the advertising boards while fielding in an ODI game against India.

== COVID-19 substitute ==
In June 2020, the ICC approved a rule providing that if a player was found COVID-19 positive in the middle of a series they would be quarantined immediately, not allowed to take part in the remainder of the series, and would be replaced by a "like for like" substitute.

In October 2020, in the opening round of the 2020–21 Plunket Shield season, Ben Lister became the first COVID-19 replacement in a cricket match. Lister replaced Mark Chapman, who reported feeling unwell, in line with the updated International Cricket Council (ICC) playing conditions for a substitute due to COVID-19.

In April 2022, in the second Test match between South Africa and Bangladesh, Glenton Stuurman and Khaya Zondo replaced Sarel Erwee and Wiaan Mulder as COVID-19 substitutes at the start of day 4 for South Africa. As a result, Khaya Zondo made his Test debut.

In June 2022, Oshada Fernando replaced Angelo Mathews as a COVID-19 substitute for Sri Lanka during the second innings of the first test against Australia. In the second Test of the series, Fernando again replaced Pathum Nissanka as a COVID-19 substitute for Sri Lanka.

== Bibliography ==
- Ashley-Cooper, F. S. (1900). At the Sign of the Wicket: Cricket 1742–1751. London: Merritt & Hatcher Ltd. OCLC 28863559.
