= 2019 Ashes series =

Test cricket series between Australia and England

- Part of Australian cricket team in England in 2019
- The Specsavers Ashes Series 2019 logo
- Date: 1 August–16 September 2019
- Location: England
- Result: Five-match series drawn 2–2 (Australia retained The Ashes)
- Player of the series: Steve Smith (Aus) and Ben Stokes (Eng); Compton–Miller Medal: Steve Smith (Aus)
Teams
- England: Australia
Captains
- Joe Root: Tim Paine
Most runs
- Ben Stokes (441) Rory Burns (390) Joe Root (325): Steve Smith (774); Marnus Labuschagne (353); Matthew Wade (337)
Most wickets
- Stuart Broad (23) Jofra Archer (22) Jack Leach (12): Pat Cummins (29); Josh Hazlewood (20); Nathan Lyon (20)

The 2019 Ashes series (officially the Specsavers Ashes Series for sponsorship reasons) was a series of Test cricket matches played between England and Australia for The Ashes in August and September 2019. The venues were Edgbaston, Lord's, Headingley, Old Trafford and The Oval.

Australia were the defending holders of the Ashes going into the series, having won in 2017–18. The series was the first in the inaugural 2019–2021 ICC World Test Championship.

The series was drawn 2–2. Australia won the first Test decisively to gain a 1–0 series lead. This was followed by a tense draw in the second Test, where a concussion substitute was used for the first time in international cricket. England then levelled the series 1–1 with a narrow win in the third Test. Australia fought back to gain a 2–1 series lead after winning the fourth Test, retaining the Ashes for the first time since 2001. However, England levelled the series with a comfortable victory in the fifth Test, resulting in the first drawn Ashes series since 1972.

Steve Smith’s phenomenal series total of 774 runs at an average of 110.57 has been lauded as one of the best batting performances of all time. Ben Stokes' match-winning 135* in the third Test also received recognition as one of the best Test innings of all time. David Warner's total of 95 runs at an average of 9.5 was the worst return of all time for an opener playing each match of a five-Test series.

== Background ==
The 2019 Ashes series began with Australia leading England by 33 series to 32, with five drawn series. Australia had won four of the last 10 Ashes series, including winning the most recent series 4–0 in 2017–18, but the 2015 series, the most recent to be held in England, was won 3–2 by the home side.

No visiting team had won an Ashes series and/or retained the Ashes since England defeated Australia 3–1 away in 2010–11. Furthermore, Australia last won an Ashes series in England in 2001. The two teams previously met in one warm-up game and two ODI matches in the Cricket World Cup held in England and Wales in the previous months, with Australia winning the warm-up game at the Rose Bowl by 12 runs and the group stage match convincingly by 64 runs at Lord's. In their semi final rematch, England had their own convincing win by eight wickets with 107 balls to spare, en route to winning the tournament for the first time.

Australia's last two Test series before the Ashes were played against India and Sri Lanka during the home summer season of 2018–19. Although India won their tour series 2–1, the first time India had won a Test series in Australia, Australia recovered to win the Test series against Sri Lanka 2–0.

Prior to the Ashes series, Australia had its top-order batsmen David Warner, Steve Smith and Cameron Bancroft available for international selection, who were banned from playing international cricket for 9–12 months due to the 2018 Australian ball-tampering scandal in Cape Town against South Africa. All three cricketers were named in Australia's squad for the 2019 Ashes.

Meanwhile, England warmed up for the 2019 Ashes with a Test series earlier in the year against the West Indies and a one-off Test against Ireland in July. The tour of the West Indies comprised three matches and was won 2–1 by the West Indies. England then improved to win the one-off Test against Ireland, by 143 runs.

Ahead of the series, it was announced that the second day of the Lord's Test would benefit the Ruth Strauss Foundation, a cancer charity set up in memory of the wife of England's Ashes-winning captain Andrew Strauss, who had died on 29 December 2018 from a rare form of lung cancer. Both teams wore red caps, the stumps were red, and fans were also encouraged to wear red. Australia already had a similar tradition – the Jane McGrath Day is the third day of the Sydney Test during the traditional New Year's Test time slot, in honour of the English-born wife of Australian fast bowler Glenn McGrath, who died from breast cancer, only with pink replacing red, and the proceeds benefiting the McGrath Foundation.

== Squads ==
On 26 July 2019, Australia announced a 17-man touring party for the Ashes series. England announced their squad for the first Test on 27 July.

England	Australia
Joe Root (c); Ben Stokes (vc); Moeen Ali^{1}; James Anderson^{2}; Jofra Archer; Jonny Bairstow (wk); Stuart Broad; Rory Burns; Jos Buttler (wk); Sam Curran; Joe Denly; Jack Leach^{1}; Craig Overton^{2}; Jason Roy; Olly Stone; Chris Woakes	Tim Paine (c, wk); Pat Cummins (vc); Travis Head (vc); Cameron Bancroft; Marcus Harris; Josh Hazlewood; Usman Khawaja; Marnus Labuschagne; Nathan Lyon; Mitchell Marsh; Michael Neser; James Pattinson; Peter Siddle; Steve Smith; Mitchell Starc; Matthew Wade (wk); David Warner

^{1} Jack Leach was added to England's squad for the second Test, with Moeen Ali being dropped.

^{2} Ahead of the fourth Test, James Anderson was ruled out of England's squad for the rest of the series, with Craig Overton named as replacement.

== Matches ==
=== First Test ===
1–5 August 2019
Scorecard

Australia	v	England
284 (80.4 overs); Steve Smith 144 (219); Stuart Broad 5/86 (22.4 overs)		374 (135.5 overs); Rory Burns 133 (312); Pat Cummins 3/84 (33 overs)
487/7d (112 overs); Steve Smith 142 (207); Ben Stokes 3/85 (22 overs)		146 (52.3 overs); Chris Woakes 37 (54); Nathan Lyon 6/49 (20 overs)

Australia won by 251 runs
Edgbaston, Birmingham
Umpires: Aleem Dar (Pak) and Joel Wilson (WI)
Player of the match: Steve Smith (Aus)

- Australia won the toss and elected to bat.
- Stuart Broad (Eng) took his 100th wicket in The Ashes in the first innings of the match, and his 450th wicket in Test cricket in the second innings.
- Rory Burns (Eng) scored his maiden Test century. He also became the tenth player to bat on all five days of a Test match.
- Steve Smith (Aus) scored his ninth and tenth centuries in the Ashes, and his 24th and 25th centuries in Tests.
- Pat Cummins (Aus) took his 100th wicket in Test cricket.
- Nathan Lyon (Aus) took his 350th wicket in Test cricket.
- This was the first time since 2005 that Australia had won the opening Test of an Ashes series in England, and their first win at Edgbaston since 2001.
- World Test Championship points: Australia 24, England 0.

==== Day one ====
The first morning of the Ashes saw Stuart Broad take the wickets of both openers, David Warner and Cameron Bancroft, who (along with Steve Smith) were returning to the Test format for the first time since their suspension for a ball-tampering incident in 2018. Warner was the first gone, leg before wicket in the fourth over, while Bancroft was caught behind just four overs later. Despite the early breakthrough, all was not tidy for England as James Anderson, recovering from an injury, bowled only four overs in the session, and while he came back onto the field, it was reported at the lunch interval that he was suffering from tightness in his right calf, and he left the field for a scan in the afternoon. Usman Khawaja was given out after drinks thanks to a review, caught by Bairstow off a thin edge. Despite this setback, Steve Smith and Travis Head managed to hold on until lunch, leaving Australia 83/3 at the break.

The first hour after lunch saw the fall of four wickets, due to good efforts by Broad and Woakes, with Head the first to go, leg before wicket to Woakes after a not out decision was referred to the third umpire, the fourth-wicket partnership having stood for 64 runs. Matthew Wade was the next man in, but he was soon dismissed in similar fashion. Tim Paine was caught at deep square leg after a "horror shot", and James Pattinson fell two balls later for a duck, leaving Australia 112/7 at the end of the 40th over. Pat Cummins fell shortly thereafter with the total at 122, but Australia scampered through to tea at 154/8, Smith unbeaten on 66.

The final session's start was delayed by 20 minutes because of the weather. Peter Siddle and Smith then shared an 88-run partnership, before Siddle was dismissed six runs short of a half-century. Smith then managed to keep the strike for the better part of a dozen overs, reaching a century in the process as the fielders were spread out on the boundary, but he was dismissed with the first over of the new ball, having reached 144 runs on his return to Test cricket, lifting Australia to a respectable 284 all out after being 122/8, with Nathan Lyon unbeaten on 12.

This left England's openers two overs to navigate before the close of play, which they batted out to a score of 10 without loss.

==== Day two ====
The morning of the second day saw the wicket of Jason Roy fall, caught behind in the slips off a delivery from Pattinson. Joe Root and Rory Burns managed to play out the rest of the session without loss, despite a scare after drinks, as Root was beaten by a ball that hit his off stump but failed to dislodge the bails; he was initially given out after the ball was caught behind, but a review showed the only contact was with the stump. This left England on 71/1 at the break, wearing down Australia's bowlers but getting little return for their troubles in terms of runs.

After lunch, both English batsmen piled on the runs on a pitch that was becoming more batsman-friendly. Root was then given out leg before wicket to Siddle, but the review this time showed he made contact, and the on-field decision was overturned. Burns soon reached a half-century, Root following suit shortly afterwards. He was finally out caught and bowled to Siddle before tea, having stood for a 132-run third-wicket partnership. The new man in, Joe Denly, stuck around until the end of the session, England reaching 170/2 with Burns 18 runs away from a maiden Test century.

The evening session saw the umpires decide to replace the ball after the 60th over. The replacement ball saw off Denly and Buttler, England now 194/4. A few overs later, Burns reached his century, becoming the first English opener to score a hundred in the first Test of an Ashes series since Graham Gooch in 1993. Burns and Ben Stokes survived the remainder of the extended final session, building a 73-run partnership, as Travis Head and Matthew Wade were brought in to bowl a few overs before the new ball, which claimed no victims by the close of play; England were 267/4, trailing Australia by 17 runs.

==== Day three ====
As play resumed on the third morning, England caught up to Australia's total, Stokes reaching a half-century before edging to the wicket-keeper on the next ball he faced from Cummins, the fifth wicket having stood for 88 runs. Shortly after drinks, Nathan Lyon was the next man to strike for Australia, taking Burns' wicket and dismissing Moeen Ali for a duck in the same over. Bairstow was out to Siddle in the next over, Australia having taken three wickets in the space of 11 balls. Woakes and Broad survived the half-hour left until lunch to put England on 328/8, the game in the balance as Australia had limited their first-innings deficit to only 44 runs at that point.

During the break, there was good news for England, as it was confirmed that Anderson, injured on the first day, would be able to bat, and had bowled in the nets during the interval. Broad and Woakes built a 65-run partnership, surviving until drinks, after which Broad was caught on a short delivery from Cummins. Anderson came in to bat, but made just three runs, England all out for 374 (a lead of 90), leading to an early tea interval. Concerns over Anderson's fitness were again apparent as he "wasn't moving well between the wickets", and when the teams returned to the field for the final session, he was absent.

With 44 overs scheduled, the evening session began with the early wicket of Warner, after a review saw him caught behind off Broad in the third over; his aggregate total of 10 runs for the match was his third-lowest in Tests when batting twice. Ali was the next to strike, removing Bancroft and almost getting Khawaja in the same over, only for the latter to be dropped by Jos Buttler at second slip. Khawaja was finally out off Ben Stokes' second ball, having stood for a 48-run third-wicket partnership with Smith, who again looked in top form despite being struck by a bouncer later on, which prompted the intervention of team doctors in light of new concussion protocols. Bad light stopped play just after 6 p.m., 31 overs having been bowled, with Australia 124/3 at the close, leading by 34 runs with Smith unbeaten on 46 and Travis Head also contributing 21 runs to the total.

==== Day four ====
The following morning saw a good session for Australia as Smith and Head put up a century partnership before drinks, Smith already with a half-century. England's potential chase became more and more uncomfortable throughout the session, despite a few scares for the batsmen. Head fell just before lunch, having put up a half-century of his own in the 130-run fourth-wicket stand. England's bowling attack, lacking Anderson, who was out of it for the remainder of the match, did not pick up another wicket by the interval and Australia were in a strong position at 231/4, having extended their lead to 141 runs, and Smith two runs short of a second century in the match.

The afternoon session began with Smith reaching his century, becoming only the fifth Australian to get two in an Ashes Test. With the 80th over approaching, Wade managed his own half-century as England was "out of options", with Root, Denly and Ali having spells that resulted in a few close calls, and a leg before wicket appeal against Smith that was deemed not out after an England review. In the first over of the new ball, Wade was given out, but his successful review saw the decision overturned. Australia finally lost a wicket in the next over as Smith was caught for 142, becoming only the fourth batsmen to score more than 140 in both innings of a Test. The fifth wicket having stood for 126 runs, skipper Tim Paine was the man in for the few overs left until tea, by which point Australia were 356/5, giving them a comfortable lead of 266.

The evening session saw Wade get a century of his own, the Australian lead now extended to over 300 runs. Paine was found not out after an England review for leg before wicket, but the sixth-wicket partnership, having stood for 76 runs, was broken in the next over as Wade was caught at deep backward square. Paine was bowled by Ali an over later, offering hints of a collapse, but Pattinson and Cummins, both unbeaten, then added 78 runs before the Australian side declared on 487/7, leaving England a target of 398.

With seven overs left in the day, England's openers were brought out to bat, safely going through them for 13 runs. Although their chances of winning were slim, a draw was still feasible.

==== Day five ====
The final morning saw Burns become only the fourth England batsmen to bat on all five days of a Test, but this accolade meant little when he was dismissed early, caught by Lyon at gully off Cummins' bowling. Joe Root was then given out leg before wicket twice, but the decision was overturned on review both times, marking yet further poor umpiring decisions in the match. Root then stood with Roy until drinks, but the partnership was ended at 41 runs after the latter was bowled playing a rash shot at a delivery from Lyon. Denly was in and out before lunch, the review not saving him this time, as Lyon struck again and had him caught at short leg. Buttler came in and survived an lbw review by Australia, but Root was dismissed by Lyon 10 minutes before lunch, England 85/4 at the break, after a session that was deemed to be "Australia's morning", thanks mostly to Lyon's contribution.

The afternoon was again fruitful for Australia, as Buttler was bowled by Cummins in the first over after the interval. Bairstow was next to fall, gloving the ball behind to become Cummins' 100th Test wicket after an unsuccessful review. Lyon struck with the next ball, removing Stokes for his 350th Test wicket, becoming the fourth Australian to reach that landmark, joining Shane Warne, Glenn McGrath and Dennis Lillee as England were in the midst of a collapse. Chris Woakes managed to slow Australia's progress until after drinks, striking boundaries and surviving a review for lbw, but Ali was then dismissed for Lyon's fifth wicket of the innings, falling to the Australian spinner for the ninth time in 11 innings. Broad was then out for a golden duck, England now 136/9, giving Lyon the chance to win the match with a hat-trick ball against Anderson; the English batsman survived the delivery, and Woakes was dropped by Smith at second slip a few overs later on a ball that rolled on to the boundary, as dark clouds loomed over the ground; however, Smith made amends two overs later, catching Woakes off the bowling of Cummins to end the match before tea, Australia coming back from 122/8 in their first innings to win by 251 runs and take a 1–0 Ashes lead. It was their first Test win at Edgbaston since 2001.

Steve Smith was named man of the match after scoring a century in each innings.

==== Aftermath ====
After the match, it was confirmed that, because of his calf injury, James Anderson would be ruled out of the second Test, and would also be likely to miss the third Test. Any further participation in the series was also uncertain, with Jofra Archer expected to replace him. England captain Joe Root nevertheless refused to blame anybody, saying that Anderson had passed all fitness tests before the match and that his selection had been unanimous. England's pace bowling options remained limited for further Tests, however, as potential replacement Olly Stone was also injured in training. Despite troubling performances by other members of the side, including Buttler, Bairstow and Ali, Root did not wish to make any "shotgun decisions" and noted that, despite the team's inconsistency, England were far from being out of contention. England's prioritisation of white-ball cricket was also put in a bad light after disappointing performances by players more accustomed to One Day Internationals than Tests.

Australian skipper Tim Paine noted that Anderson's exclusion had deprived England of one of the world's best bowlers, and that his side's confidence grew as a result. However, he also warned against becoming complacent, making parallels with Australia's performance in preceding tours against India, South Africa and Pakistan, where they "[jumped] the gun with an emphatic win only to surrender a high-profile series". In the meantime, Australia played a three-day tour match against Worcestershire, which, as a result of rain washing out most of the final day, was drawn.

Criticism was directed at umpires Aleem Dar and Joel Wilson, who had 10 of their decisions overturned over the course of the game, with former Australia captain Ricky Ponting suggesting that the ICC's requirements of neutral umpires should be waived in the future, to reduce umpire workload and fatigue. Root, however, noted that players and umpires, both under pressure to perform, make mistakes, and that over-criticism and blame games should be avoided. The idea, which had already surfaced before, had also been opposed by the umpires themselves, who "[were] happier to accept criticism of their decision-making on a basis of skills, conditions, eyesight – just about anything so long as they are not regarded as biased towards one side".

=== Second Test ===
14–18 August 2019
Scorecard

England	v	Australia
258 (77.1 overs); Rory Burns 53 (127); Josh Hazlewood 3/58 (22 overs)		250 (94.3 overs); Steve Smith 92 (161); Stuart Broad 4/65 (27.3 overs)
258/5d (71 overs); Ben Stokes 115* (165); Pat Cummins 3/35 (17 overs)		154/6 (47.3 overs); Marnus Labuschagne 59 (100); Jofra Archer 3/32 (15 overs)

Match drawn
Lord's, London
Umpires: Aleem Dar (Pak) and Chris Gaffaney (NZ)
Player of the match: Ben Stokes (Eng)

- Australia won the toss and elected to field.
- No play was possible on day 1 due to rain. No play was possible after lunch on day 3 due to rain. Start of play was delayed on day 5 due to rain.
- Jofra Archer (Eng) made his Test debut.
- Aleem Dar equalled the record for the most Test matches umpired with 128.
- Steve Smith (Aus) was replaced on day 5 by Marnus Labuschagne, after suffering a concussion on the previous day. This was the first such substitution in a Test match.
- World Test Championship points: Australia 8, England 8.

==== Day one ====
The first day of the second Test was washed out because of intermittent rain that prevented the ground from drying and the toss from taking place, leaving four extended days, weather permitting, to complete the match.

==== Day two ====
Play began on the second day with England's openers sent in to bat in the morning session. Australia struck in the second over, Jason Roy out for a three-ball duck, caught by Paine off Hazlewood's bowling, the latter returning to the Test side after not being selected for Edgbaston. Joe Root then came in, but he was trapped leg before wicket by Hazlewood, leaving England at 26/2. Denly, the new man in, was hit by a bouncer in the next over, leading to an early drinks break. Nevertheless, he and Rory Burns survived until lunch, contributing a 50-run partnership to rebuild England's innings after the early wickets. This left the home team at 76/2 at the interval.

The second session saw Denly caught behind by Tim Paine off Hazlewood, before Burns reached a half-century. His wicket fell shortly thereafter, however, thanks to a splendid catch by Bancroft at short leg, off the bowling of Cummins. Jos Buttler and Ben Stokes were the next to fall, leaving England on 138/6 with less than an hour to go until tea. Australia reviewed for lbw against Bairstow a few overs before the interval, but this turned out to be a poor decision and the England batsmen did not lose any more wickets before the break, by which point they were 201/6.

The extended evening session, with 37 overs scheduled over two-and-a-half hours, first saw Woakes caught behind on a ball that grazed his glove, the review confirming the on-field decision. England's remaining wickets then fell quickly, with Archer and Broad the next victims. Bairstow reached the 50-run milestone, but he was soon gone, England all out for 258.

This left England's bowlers a theoretical 18 overs in just under an hour before the close. Warner fell first in the fifth over, for his third single-digit score of the series; however, Bancroft and Khawaja survived eight more overs before play was brought to a close with Australia on 30/1.

==== Day three ====
The third morning saw 24.1 overs of play, the second wicket pushing the score to 60 before Bancroft was leg before wicket to Archer. Khawaja edged behind off Woakes in the next over, and Head did not last long as he was lbw to Broad, Australia 71/4. Stokes then thought he had Wade trapped for another lbw, but the on-field decision was overturned and Australia lost no further wickets before rain brought an early lunch, the total now 80/4. The weather remained inclement throughout the afternoon and the evening, and no further play was possible.

==== Day four ====
Play resumed on the fourth day with Smith and Wade at the crease. Wade was caught at slip off a delivery by Broad shortly before drinks, but Paine survived with Smith until lunch, the latter reaching a half-century to bring Australia's total to 155/5 at the break, England failing to make any further breakthroughs despite a few close calls.

The sixth-wicket partnership was broken after the interval as Paine edged the ball to Buttler off Archer. Smith was then hit on the arm by a short delivery from Archer a few overs later, but was given the green light to continue after examination by team doctors. A review for lbw against Cummins was soon struck down as Archer continued to put pressure on the Australian batsmen, including hitting Smith directly in the neck with a bouncer; the batsman fell to the ground briefly, but had to retire hurt, though he was able to walk off the field unassisted after a chat with the team doctor. The new man in, Siddle, lasted only a few overs, failing to reach a double-digit score, at which point Smith was brought back in; however, he was soon out leg before wicket to Woakes after an unsuccessful review. Australia's tailenders were out before tea, giving them a total of 250, trailing by eight runs with England's second innings to begin after the interval.

Cummins struck early by removing Roy and then getting Root for a golden duck, but Denly survived the hat-trick ball. This led to a 55-run fourth-wicket partnership, which ended with Denly caught and bowled by Siddle. Burns fell next, but Buttler survived until late in the session, when rain stopped play for the day with England on 96/4.

==== Day five ====
The final day was again affected by rain as the start was delayed until just after noon. As the players came back on the field, there was confirmation that Steve Smith, struck by a bouncer the previous day, would not come back to the match. He was substituted by Marnus Labuschagne, who became the first concussion substitute in Test cricket after the ICC's decision to allow such replacements. Smith was later ruled out of the third Test at Headingley.

England's fifth wicket stood for the remainder of the morning session as Ben Stokes reached a half-century, unbeaten on 51 at the interval with England at 157/4. Buttler was caught by Hazlewood off Cummins soon after lunch, but Bairstow played on with Stokes until the latter reached a century, at which point England declared on 258/5. This left Australia a target of 267 runs to win off a scheduled 50 overs, albeit leaving England with an outside chance to bowl their opposition out. England made an early breakthrough, Archer removing both Warner and Khawaja inside the first six overs, before Leach trapped Bancroft lbw with the final ball of the 14th over; however, Labuschagne and Head proved obstinate at the crease, putting on 85 runs for the fourth wicket before Labuschagne was caught by a diving Root at midwicket for 59 at the end of the 36th over. Labuschagne also went onto become the first concussion substitute to score a test fifty during the process. Wade was next to go seven balls later, out for one, before Denly produced a diving catch to remove Paine for four off the bowling of Archer, Australia now 149/6. Nevertheless, Head continued to stick around at the other end, farming the strike from Cummins and managing 42 runs to help Australia see out the final eight overs.

Ben Stokes was named man of the match after scoring a century in the second innings.

=== Third Test ===
22–26 August 2019 (Note: While five days of play were scheduled for each Test, the third and fifth Tests reached a result in four days.)
Scorecard

Australia	v	England
179 (52.1 overs); Marnus Labuschagne 74 (129); Jofra Archer 6/45 (17.1 overs)		67 (27.5 overs); Joe Denly 12 (49); Josh Hazlewood 5/30 (12.5 overs)
246 (75.2 overs); Marnus Labuschagne 80 (187); Ben Stokes 3/56 (24.2 overs)		362/9 (125.4 overs); Ben Stokes 135* (219); Josh Hazlewood 4/85 (31 overs)

England won by 1 wicket
Headingley, Leeds
Umpires: Chris Gaffaney (NZ) and Joel Wilson (WI)
Player of the match: Ben Stokes (Eng)

- England won the toss and elected to field.
- Rain delayed the start of play, and shortened both the morning and the afternoon sessions on day one.
- Jofra Archer (Eng) took his maiden five-wicket haul in Tests.
- England's score of 67 was their lowest against Australia in the Ashes since 1948.
- This was England's highest successful run chase in Tests.
- World Test Championship points: England 24, Australia 0.

==== Day one ====
Rain delayed the toss in the morning and play started shortly after noon with lunch delayed to 1:30 p.m. Only four overs could be completed before rain again interrupted play after the wicket of Harris, Australia 12/1. Lunch was taken early, but rain did not allow for resumption of play until 2 p.m. Khawaja was then caught after England referred the decision to the video umpire, but only 9.5 overs were possible before rain again prevented continuation. A few more overs were possible before bad light stopped play, with Australia on 54/2 at the early tea interval.

The evening session was unaffected by rain, and Australia's third wicket stood for 111 runs before Warner, having previously successfully overturned an on-field decision, was caught off Archer. After this, Australia, on 136/3, collapsed to 179 all out by the close. Archer claimed five more victims to end the innings with figures of 6/45 in his second Test match.

==== Day two ====
The second day was played in sunny conditions, but this did not prevent England from struggling with the bat; Denly was the only batsman to reach double digits, scoring 12 after surviving an lbw review. England were 54/6 at the interval, with the Ashes "hanging by a thread".

The England debacle continued after lunch, with Woakes out on the first ball of the afternoon session, the final three wickets then falling in quick succession as the home side was all out for 67, with Hazlewood picking up a five-wicket haul for the visitors.

The dismal batting performance of both teams, the previous 18 wickets having fallen for 110 runs, appeared to continue into the second Australia innings as Warner was lbw for a duck in the second over. Harris and Khawaja added 26 runs to the total, surviving a review for lbw, before Harris was bowled by Leach. Khawaja was soon caught by Roy at second slip off Woakes, and Australia were 82/3 at tea.

After the interval, the fourth wicket stood for 46 runs before losing Head with the total at 97/4, only for Wade and Labuschagne to build a 66-run partnership after surviving multiple reviews. Wade and Paine were given out shortly before stumps, as Labuschagne reached a half-century to put Australia on 171/6, a lead of 283.

==== Day three ====
The third day was played in similar sunny conditions to the second. Labuschagne and Pattinson returned to the crease, with the former resuming on 53 not out. Their partnership eventually reached 51 before Pattinson was caught behind by Root off Archer's bowling. Cummins came in to join Labuschagne but his innings was short-lived, as he made just six runs before being caught in the slips by Burns off Stokes. Shortly after, Labuschagne was run out by Denly and finished on 80 runs, with Australia at 237/9 and leading by 349 runs. The final wicket fell half an hour before lunch as Lyon was bowled out by Archer and Australia finished with a lead of 358, setting what would be England's highest ever run chase in Test cricket.

England's second innings began shortly before lunch and openers Burns and Roy saw out the opening overs to go in 11/0 at the break. Shortly after play resumed, England lost both their opening batsmen in quick succession. Burns fell first, caught behind off Hazlewood before Roy was bowled by Cummins. Root and Denly came to the crease at 15/2 with just under two sessions until the close of play. The pair built a solid partnership and moved to 140/2 with both reaching half-centuries before Denly was given out caught behind off Hazlewood. Stokes was the next batsman in and was able to see out the rest of the day with Root. England finished on 156/3, requiring 203 more runs for victory.

==== Day four ====
The fourth day of the Test started poorly for England. The first 25 balls were dots and the new ball was due to be available to Australia in another four overs. Root eventually opened the scoring for the day before being caught behind by Warner off Lyon's bowling, having made 77 runs. This wicket took Lyon to 356 in Test cricket and saw him go third in Australia's list of all-time highest Test wicket-takers. Bairstow joined Stokes at the crease with the score 159/4 and the partnership made 79 runs before lunch to bring England to 238/4, needing 121 more runs to win. At this stage, it seemed as though if Stokes and Bairstow could continue batting as sensibly as they had, then victory was a real possibility.

However, soon after play resumed, England suffered a string of quick wickets. Bairstow was the first to fall, caught behind by Labuschagne off Hazlewood for 36. Buttler was in next but made only 1 before confusion between him and Stokes left him well short of his crease when Head hit the stumps to run him out. Similarly, Woakes came in next and added just one run before driving a ball from Hazlewood straight to Wade. At this point, England were 261/7 and needed 98 more runs to win. Archer came to the crease and added 15 to the score with a few boundaries before picking out Head at deep midwicket off Lyon. Broad survived just one ball before being given out lbw, which was confirmed after his review, and England had just one wicket remaining with 73 more runs needed for victory. Since the lunch interval, they had lost 5 wickets for just 48 runs.

Jack Leach was the final man in for England with the score at 286/9 and their game plan soon became apparent. Stokes took the brunt of the Australian attack, never allowing Leach to face more than the final couple of balls of any over so that Stokes could keep the strike. Stokes started well, hitting Lyon for a six in the first over of the partnership. He then made a few runs from the next over from Pattinson before hitting Lyon for two sixes in the next over, the second a reverse sweep, finishing the over with England at 310/9. Two overs later, he hit Cummins for another six before pulling Hazlewood for four to reach his century. He then hit two more sixes from Hazlewood's bowling – making 16 from just three balls – and moved England to 338/9. Stokes was then dropped by Harris, although it was a tough catch to take, before hitting consecutive fours off Cummins to move the score to 350/9. Leach then had to face the final two balls of Cummins' over and an lbw shout off the final ball was reviewed by Australia after umpire Chris Gaffaney gave it not out; the ball was found to have pitched outside leg, confirming umpire Gaffaney's decision, and the review was lost. Lyon continued the attack and was smacked down the ground for six more by Stokes. England needed just two runs to win and one run to tie. Two balls later, Lyon fumbled what would have been a certain run-out with Leach well out of his crease before hitting Stokes on the pad to huge cries for lbw. Umpire Joel Wilson gave it not out and Australia had no reviews left; had the decision been reviewed, it would have been given out. This was the final ball of the over so Stokes was unable to rotate the strike and Leach potentially had to face a full over from Cummins. He scored a single from the third ball of the over – his only scoring stroke of the innings – which both ensured England could not lose the game and gave Stokes the strike with England needing just one run to win. Stokes promptly cut the next ball from Cummins through the covers for four to give England the most unlikely victory imaginable, completing their highest ever run chase in Tests.

=== Fourth Test ===
4–8 September 2019
Scorecard

Australia	v	England
497/8d (126 overs); Steve Smith 211 (319); Stuart Broad 3/97 (25 overs)		301 (107 overs); Rory Burns 81 (185); Josh Hazlewood 4/57 (25 overs)
186/6d (42.5 overs); Steve Smith 82 (92); Jofra Archer 3/45 (14 overs)		197 (91.3 overs); Joe Denly 53 (123); Pat Cummins 4/43 (24 overs)

Australia won by 185 runs
Old Trafford, Manchester
Umpires: Kumar Dharmasena (SL) and Marais Erasmus (SA)
Player of the match: Steve Smith (Aus)

- Australia won the toss and elected to bat.
- Only 44 overs were bowled on day 1 due to rain.
- Australia retained the Ashes as a result of this match.
- World Test Championship points: Australia 24, England 0.

=== Fifth Test ===
12–16 September 2019
Scorecard

England	v	Australia
294 (87.1 overs); Jos Buttler 70 (98); Mitchell Marsh 5/46 (18.2 overs)		225 (68.5 overs); Steve Smith 80 (145); Jofra Archer 6/62 (23.5 overs)
329 (95.3 overs); Joe Denly 94 (206); Nathan Lyon 4/69 (24.3 overs)		263 (77 overs); Matthew Wade 117 (166); Jack Leach 4/49 (22 overs)

England won by 135 runs
The Oval, London
Umpires: Kumar Dharmasena (SL) and Marais Erasmus (SA)
Player of the match: Jofra Archer (Eng)

- Australia won the toss and elected to field.
- Joe Root (Eng) scored his 7,000th run in Tests.
- Jonny Bairstow (Eng) scored his 4,000th run in Tests.
- Mitchell Marsh (Aus) took his maiden five-wicket haul in Tests.
- Steve Smith became the first batsman to register 10 successive scores of 50 or more against a single opponent in Test history.
- Peter Siddle (Aus) played his final Test match.
- World Test Championship points: England 24, Australia 0.

== Statistics ==
=== Most runs ===
Rank	Runs	Player	Team	Innings	Average	High Score	100	50
1	774	Steve Smith	(Australia)	7	110.57	211	3	3
2	441	Ben Stokes	(England)	10	55.12	135*	2	2
3	390	Rory Burns	(England)	10	39.00	133	1	2
4	353	Marnus Labuschagne	(Australia)	7	50.42	80	0	4
5	337	Mathew Wade	(Australia)	10	33.70	117	2	0
Last Updated: 1 August 2022

=== Most wickets ===
Rank	Wickets	Player	Team	Innings	Best	Average	Economy	5w
1	29	Pat Cummins	(Australia)	10	4/32	19.62	2.69	0
2	23	Stuart Broad	(England)	10	5/86	26.65	3.49	1
3	22	Jofra Archer	(England)	8	6/45	20.27	2.85	2
4	20	Josh Hazlewood	(Australia)	8	5/30	21.85	2.70	1
4	20	Nathan Lyon	(Australia)	10	6/49	33.40	2.75	1
Last Updated: 1 August 2022

=== Individual ===
Statistic	England		Australia	
Most runs	Ben Stokes	441	Steve Smith	774
Highest innings	Ben Stokes	135*	Steve Smith	211
Highest batting average	Ben Stokes	55.12	Steve Smith	110.57
Most centuries	Ben Stokes	2	Steve Smith	3
Most fifties	Joe Root	4	Marnus Labuschagne	4
Most fours	Rory Burns	49	Steve Smith	92
Most sixes	Ben Stokes	13	Steve Smith	5
Most wickets	Stuart Broad	23	Pat Cummins	29
Most five-wicket hauls	Jofra Archer	2	Josh Hazlewood; Nathan Lyon; Mitchell Marsh	1
Best innings figures	Jofra Archer	17.1–3–45–6	Nathan Lyon	20.0–5–49–6
Best bowling average (min. 10 wickets)	Jofra Archer	20.27	Pat Cummins	19.62
Most catches (wicket-keepers excluded)	Joe Root	7	Steve Smith	12
Most dismissals (wicket-keepers only)	Jonny Bairstow	22 (20c/2st)	Tim Paine	20 (20c/0st)

=== Team ===
Statistic	England	Australia
Highest team innings	374	497/8d
Lowest team innings	67	179

=== Openers ===
David Warner's total of 95 runs at an average of 9.5 was the worst return of all time for an opener playing each match of a five-Test series; he was dismissed seven times by Stuart Broad and three times by Jofra Archer. Both teams were afflicted by opening struggles: Warner's partner Cameron Bancroft was dropped after averaging 11 in the first two matches, his replacement Marcus Harris averaged 9.66, and England opener Jason Roy was demoted after three Tests averaging 9.5 before being dropped after the fourth, though England had the better time of it, with Rory Burns averaging 39 from five matches, and Roy's replacement Joe Denly averaging 41.25 from two.

== Broadcasting ==
Country	Television broadcaster(s)	Radio broadcaster(s)
Australia	Nine Network	ABC Local Radio; ABC Grandstand
United Kingdom; Ireland	Sky Sports	BBC Radio 4 LW; BBC Radio 5 Sports Extra

== In popular culture ==
An Australian docu-series - The Test was produced, following the Australian national cricket team in the aftermath of the Australian ball tampering scandal. The seventh and eighth episode of Season 1 featured Australia playing the five tests against England.
