= SABR (disambiguation) =

Sabr or SABR may refer to:

- Sabr, an Islamic term that roughly translates to patience
- SABR, the Society for American Baseball Research.

Sabr or SABR may also refer to:

- Sabre Corporation (NASDAQ: SABR), an American travel technology company
- SABR volatility model, in mathematical finance
- Scalable Agile Beam Radar (AN/APG-83), a fire control radar for the F-16 Fighting Falcon and other aircraft
- Selectable Assault Battle Rifle, an alternative name for the XM29 OICW
- Sneak Attack By Roger, a tennis acronym for a playing tactic pioneered by Roger Federer
- Stereotactic ablative body radiotherapy
- Smart Adaptive Bit Rate
- Sabr: Finding My Way in Cricket and Life, 2026 book by former Australian international cricketer Usman Khawaja
