= Ishant Sharma =

Indian cricketer

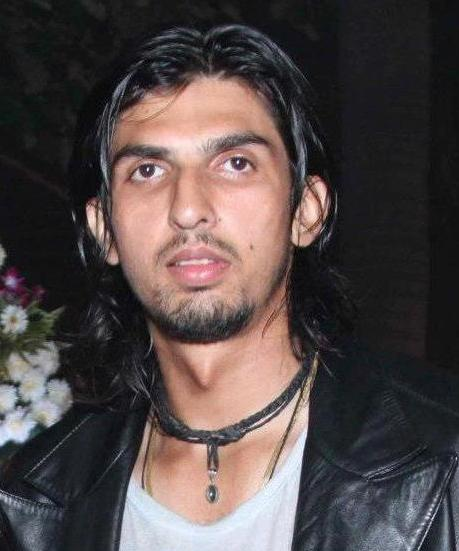
- Sharma in 2012

Personal information
- Full name: Ishant Sharma
- Born: 2 September 1988 (age 38); Delhi, India
- Nickname: Lambu
- Height: 6 ft 4 in (193 cm)
- Batting: Right-handed
- Bowling: Right-arm fast-medium
- Role: Bowler

International information
- National side: India (2007–2021)
- Test debut (cap 258): 25 May 2007 v Bangladesh
- Last Test: 25 November 2021 v New Zealand
- ODI debut (cap 169): 29 June 2007 v South Africa
- Last ODI: 17 January 2016 v Australia
- ODI shirt no.: 1
- T20I debut (cap 21): 1 February 2008 v Australia
- Last T20I: 10 October 2013 v Australia
- T20I shirt no.: 1

Domestic team information
- Years: Team
- 2006/07–present: Delhi
- 2008–2010: Kolkata Knight Riders
- 2011–2012: Deccan Chargers
- 2013–2015: Sunrisers Hyderabad
- 2016: Rising Pune Supergiants
- 2017: Kings XI Punjab
- 2018: Sussex
- 2019–2024: Delhi Capitals
- 2025: Gujarat Titans

Career statistics
Competition	Test	ODI	T20I	FC
Matches	105	80	14	154
Runs scored	785	72	8	1,095
Batting average	8.26	4.80	8.00	8.48
100s/50s	0/1	0/0	0/0	0/2
Top score	57	13	5*	66
Balls bowled	19,160	3,733	278	27,294
Wickets	311	115	8	486
Bowling average	32.40	30.98	50.00	28.57
5 wickets in innings	11	0	0	16
10 wickets in match	1	–	–	2
Best bowling	7/74	4/34	2/34	7/24
Catches/stumpings	23/–	19/–	4/–	34/–
Medal record
Men's Cricket
Representing India
ICC Champions Trophy
Winner	2013 England and Wales
ICC World Test Championship
Runner-up	2019–2021
ACC Asia Cup
Runner-up	2008 Pakistan
- Source: ESPNcricinfo, 25 March 2025

Ishant Sharma (born 2 September 1988) is an Indian cricketer who has represented India in Tests, ODIs and T20Is. He is a 6 ft 4 in tall right-arm fast-medium bowler. In 2011, he became the fifth youngest player to take 100 Test wickets. While often considered a "rhythm" bowler, prioritizing accuracy, he still is one of the fastest Indian bowlers having bowled in excess of 150 km/h on several occasions. In 2020, Indian government has awarded him the Arjuna Award to recognize his outstanding achievement in cricket. Sharma was a member of the Indian team that won the 2013 ICC Champions Trophy.

In February 2021, during the series against England, Ishant took his 300th wicket in Test cricket. He is regarded as one of the greatest pacers in Indian Cricket.

== Domestic and first-class career ==
Ishant plays for Delhi in domestic cricket and has taken 68 wickets in 14 first-class games, including a five-wicket haul against Baroda on the opening day of a match Delhi drew after failing to bowl Baroda out on the fourth day.

Ishant toured England with the India Under-19s in 2006 and Pakistan in 2006–07. He played three youth tests and six youth One Day Internationals for India. On the basis of his strong performance in Australia in 2008, Ishant Sharma was bought for a winning bid of $950,000 by Kolkata Knight Riders in the player auction for the Indian Premier League. This was the highest amount paid for any bowler in the tournament.

On 15 February 2018, it was officially announced that Ishant will join Sussex CCC for the first two months of the 2018 county season, available from 4 April to 4 June 2018, thus making him the 9th Indian to play for Sussex.

== International career ==
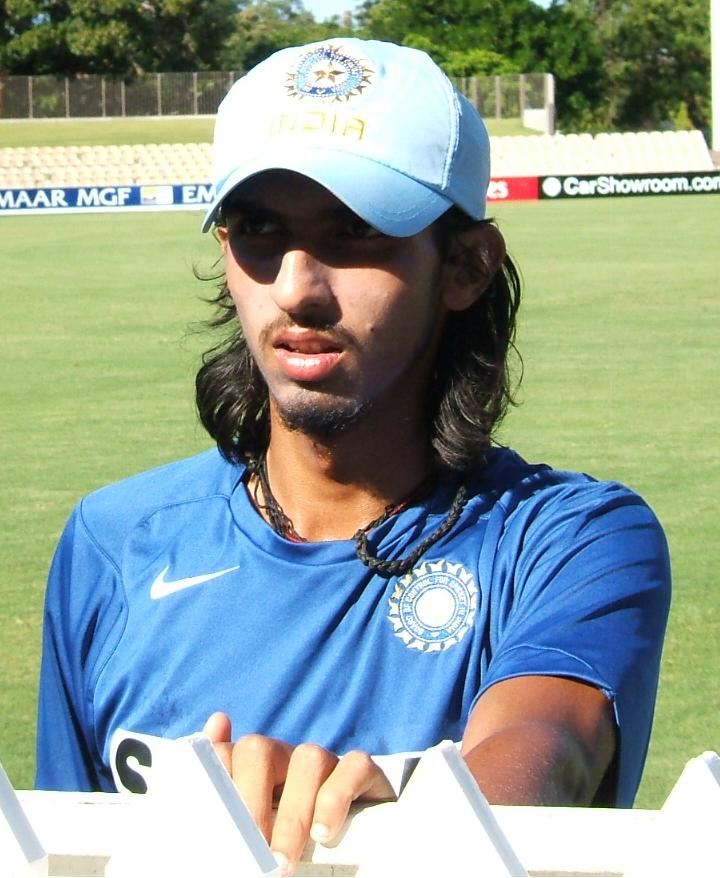
Ishant Sharma in 2008

At the age of 18, Sharma was called to join the Indian squad for the tour of South Africa in 2006–07. However, after receiving the call and organising travel arrangements, he was deselected.

In May 2007, Sharma was selected in the Test team for the Bangladesh tour and played as a replacement for the fast bowler Munaf Patel. Over there he played for his national side in the second Test where he bowled three overs including one maiden and conceded only five runs without taking a wicket. Later on, he was called for the tour of England in July–August 2007.

Sharma got a call back in the team in the 3rd Test during Pakistan's tour of India in December 2007 due to injury of India's frontline pacers Zaheer Khan, RP Singh, and Sreesanth. Sharma picked up 5 wickets during the third Test in Bangalore. This performance earned him a place in India's squad for the tour of Australia.

Sharma was left out in the Boxing Day Test at Melbourne during the Border–Gavaskar Trophy as India retained their main fast bowlers, Zaheer Khan and RP Singh. However, in January 2008 Sharma was called to represent India once again to replace the injured Zaheer Khan in the second Test at the SCG. Sharma started the first day of the match strongly and was involved in a controversial decision from Steve Bucknor when Andrew Symonds nicked the ball to keeper MS Dhoni off his bowling but was given not out. He bowled reasonably in the match, however without much luck.

Although he had little success, the management retained him for the third Test match at Perth. On the fourth day of the match, he bowled an exceptional spell to Australian captain Ricky Ponting that resulted in his wicket and helped India claim victory. He used the pace and bounce of the WACA wicket to trouble the batsmen. In the following Test played in Adelaide he picked up two wickets and impressed everyone with his bowling. He finished the tour of Australia with figures of 6/358, an average of 59.66 and a strike rate of 101.0.

On 10 February 2008, Sharma bagged four important wickets in the 4th ODI of CB Series against Australia. He ended the match with figures of 4/38 and named Man of the Match. He scalped two important wickets on 18 February 2008 versus Australia in the 7th ODI of CB series.

During the 2008 Test series against Australia in India, Ishant was the leading wicket-taker, with 16, and was named man-of-the-series as India won 2–0. He thereby became the first Indian paceman to win such an award in a Test series on Indian soil after Kapil Dev who won the award in 1983. He was noted for achieving reverse swing on balls sometimes as young as eight overs, and along with senior opening bowler Zaheer Khan, troubled the touring Australians. He took Australian captain Ricky Ponting's wicket three times during the series, and six times in as many Tests, making the Indian press label Ponting as Ishant's bunny.

However, in 2009, Ishant's form slumped, and he was dropped for the second Test against Sri Lanka, replaced by Sreesanth.

On 5 October 2010, Ishant helped VVS Laxman pull off a highly unlikely win over Australia by one wicket in the first Test in Mohali after India had fallen to 8/124 in pursuit of 205. Ishant provided Laxman with support during an 81-run partnership in which he contributed 31 valuable runs.

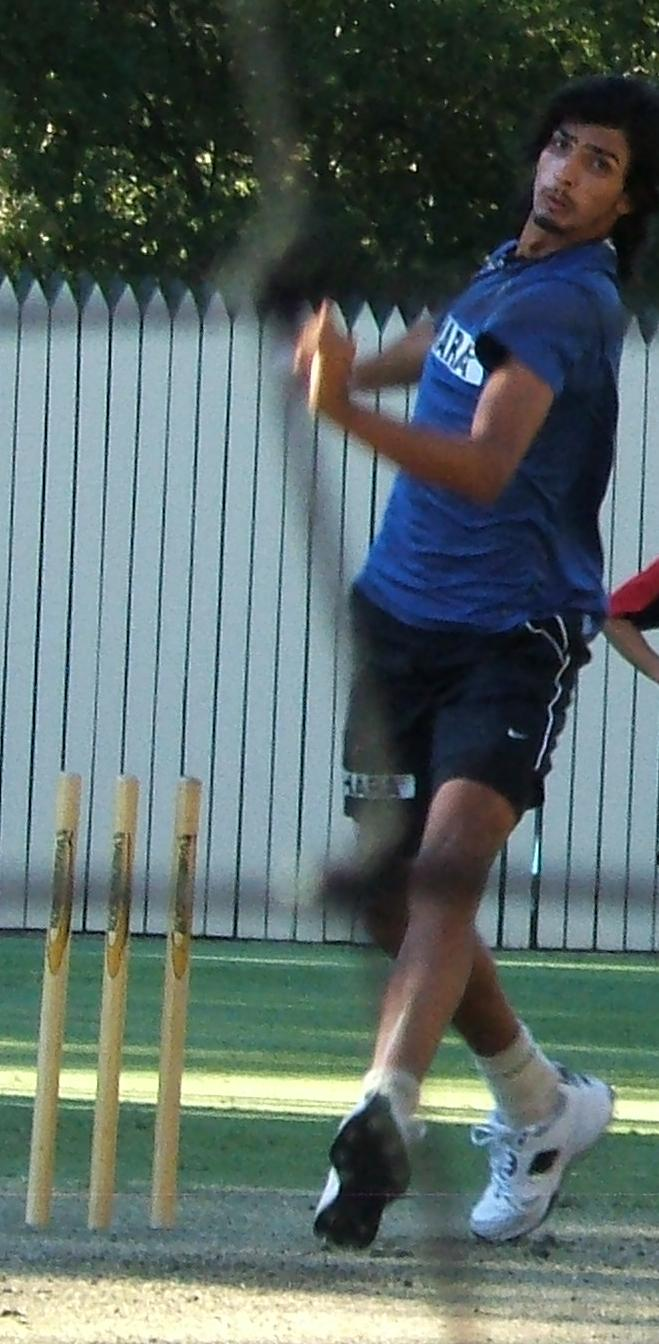
Sharma bowling in the nets in 2008

In the 2011 IPL auction, Sharma was bought by the Deccan Chargers; he hoped that his performance in the competition would give him a chance to impress selectors and push for selection in India's ODI team. From 12 matches, Sharma took 11 wickets at an average of 28.54. A month after the IPL, which was held in April and May, India toured the West Indies for five ODIs and three Tests. Several senior players were rested from the ODI side and others absent through injury; this mostly affected the batsmen but Zaheer Khan missed the ODI series. India won the first three ODIs, and Sharma was called into the team for the fourth, his first ODI since August 2010. He managed one wicket from two matches in the series while conceding 109 runs. The first Test resulted in a win for India and Sharma took three wickets in each innings. He claimed his 100th Test wicket in the second Test, becoming the fifth youngest to reach the landmark; the fixture was also the first time he took ten wickets in a match for India. The second and third Tests ended in draws and India won the series 1–0; Sharma was the leading wicket-taker on either side with 22 dismissals at an average of 16.86.

After the tour of West Indies, India suffer a run of eight consecutive defeats in away Tests. In July and August the team played four Tests in England. England inflicted a 4–0 whitewash on India, and in the process replaced India as No. 1 ranked Test team. Playing in all four matches, Sharma managed 11 wickets at an average pushing 60. During the series Sharma suffered an ankle injury and missed the ODI leg, but was sufficiently recovered to face the West Indies in November when India hosted them for three Tests. While India won 2–0, Sharma managed five wickets from three matches at a cost of in excess of 65 runs each. Sharma played in all four Tests of India's tour of Australia in 2011–12. India lost the series 4–0, while Sharma took five wickets at the cost of 451 runs.

In March 2012, Sharma underwent surgery on his ankle which had been troubling him for over a year. The operation meant that he missed the 2012 IPL.

In 2013 Ind vs. Aus ODI series, he gave away 30 runs in an over, equalling the most expensive over by an Indian bowler and joining Yuvraj Singh, who himself had previously conceded 30 runs in an ODI match against England in 2007.

After some bad performances against Australia in 2013 ODI series, he came back strongly against South Africa taking 4/40 in the third ODI on 11 December 2013 at SuperSport Park, which was his 2nd best performance in ODIs.

In the 2014 tour of England, Sharma secured his career-best figures of 7/74 at the Lord's, with an aggressive spell in England's second innings, bowling India to a 95-run win. During the first Test of the series, Sharma suffered the slight ignominy of becoming Alastair Cook's sole Test wicket when caught down the leg side. India finished the series losing 3–1. He finished the 2015 three-match Test series in Sri Lanka with 13 wickets, including a 5-wicket haul in the third Test at SSC. At the end of the match, he was handed a one-match ban by the International Cricket Council (ICC), following an altercation with Dhammika Prasad in the course of the match. The series also saw him pick his 200th wicket in Tests. India won the series 2–1.

Ishant Sharma has sustained an injury on his right hand during the World Test Championship (WTC) final against New Zealand at the Ageas Bowl in Southampton..

According to PTI, Ishant Sharma had multiple stitches on his middle and fourth finger in his right hand

In August 2018, during the fourth Test against England, Sharma took his 250th Test wicket. In the fifth test, he took 3 wickets in England's first innings and thereby equaled Kapil Dev's record of taking the most wickets by an Indian bowler in England. He finished the series as the second-highest wicket taker, with 18 wickets. In India's following tour of Australia, he took 11 wickets in the first three tests, before being ruled out of the final Test due to ribcage discomfort.

In August 2019, Ishant took his 9th Test 5-wicket haul against West Indies in the 1st Test match of India tour of West Indies 2019, at the Sir Vivian Richards Stadium, with figures of 5/43 in the 1st innings. In the 2nd Test match of the same series, batting at No.9, Ishant hit his first half-century in Test Cricket. In February 2021, Ishant completed his 100th Test match against England in the third Test match (2nd day/night Test in India) of England Tour of India, at the Motera Stadium Ishant Sharma became only the fourth Indian bowler to play 100 Test matches, Kapil Dev being the only other fast bowler to achieve the feat.

== Bowling style ==
A right arm fast-medium bowler, the speed of Sharma's bowling has diminished since he emerged on the international scene, although in 2008 he bowled a delivery at over 152 kilometres per hour (94 mph). Such occurrences were not the norm as his pace dropped to around 130 km/h (81 mph), but under Eric Simons (who was India's bowling coach from 2010 to 2012) Sharma was regularly bowling in excess of 140 km/h (87 mph) when India toured Australia in 2011/12. According to India's former bowling coach Venkatesh Prasad he is amongst the most dedicated bowler in India's set up.

Simons noted height was a factor in the length Sharma bowled, saying "For Ishant to hit the stumps, he has to pitch it fuller, and that means the batsman has more chance of keeping it out". Former West Indies fast bowler Courtney Walsh identified two problems with Sharma's bowling action: his head drops when the ball is delivered and the position of his wrist varies. The first takes some of the speed out of the delivery, while the second reduces the chance of the ball seaming and swinging. The former India batsman Sanjay Manjrekar suggested that the lack of movement in Sharma's bowling discouraged him from pitching the ball up so instead, he tends to bowl short. The slower pace of his bowling when he pitches the ball up may explain why the yorker is not an effective delivery for him. Manjrekar went further, saying that "for all his talent and commitment he just does not take enough wickets"; when the remark was made in January 2012, Sharma had a bowling average of nearly 37 from 43 Tests.

Former Australian great, Glenn McGrath, feels Ishant is more of a workhorse than a strike bowler and needs to figure out his role in the Indian team, but he is happy that Ishant is slowly adapting to conditions, commenting "When Ishant started off, he took the world by storm bowling good pace. He is probably not bowling at the same pace. But he is much more experienced now with good control. The Edgbaston Test showed that Ishant has started adopting a bit more". McGrath also acknowledged the fact that playing on sub-continent tracks might have contributed to a not so impressive record of Ishant and believes that Ishant has to hit the seam more often, saying "You have got to hit the seam and maybe a bit of movement off the pitch will help. My weapon was bounce and occasionally a bit of seam movement"

== IPL career ==
Ishant Sharma played for Kings XI Punjab in the Indian Premier League. In December 2018, he was bought by the Delhi Capitals in the player auction for the 2019 Indian Premier League. In 2026, Sharma was part of the Gujarat Titans squad that finished as runners-up in the Indian Premier League, losing to Royal Challengers Bengaluru in the final.

== Personal life ==
Sharma comes from a Brahmin family. On 10 December 2016, he married Indian basketball player Pratima Singh.
