= Spirit of cricket =

The spirit of cricket is a concept in cricket embodying the principles of sportsmanship, fair play, and mutual respect that are considered fundamental to the game.

== See also ==
- Laws of Cricket
- Marylebone Cricket Club
- Cowdrey Lecture
- Bodyline
- 2018 Australian ball-tampering scandal
- Sledging (cricket)
