= List of international cricket centuries by Steve Smith =

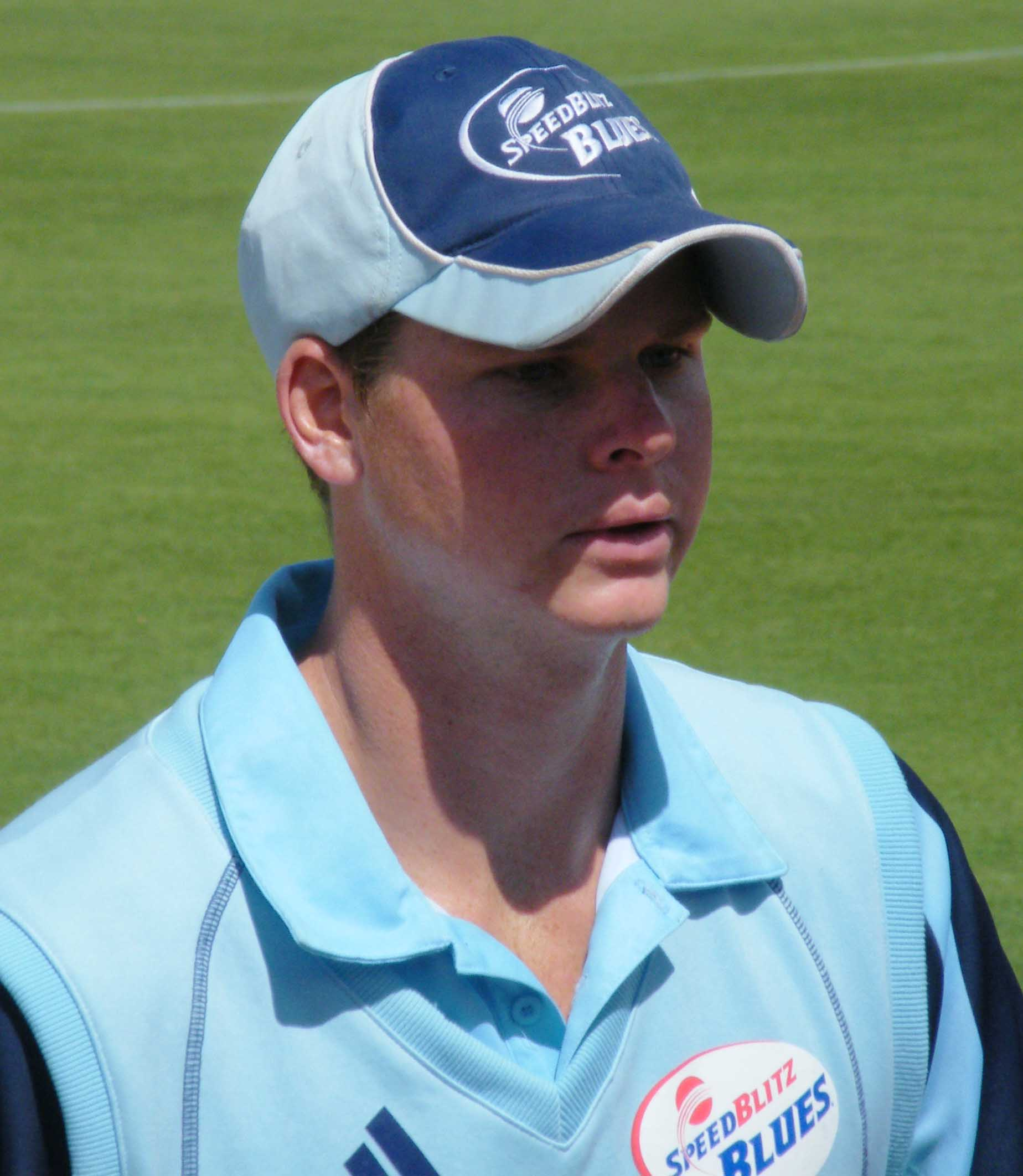
Steve Smith has scored 49 international centuries for Australia.

Steve Smith is an Australian cricketer and a former captain of the Australian national team. As of January 2026, Smith has played 123 Test and 170 One Day International (ODI) matches for Australia, and has scored 37 and 12 centuries in the respective formats. (Note: He has the joint second-highest number of centuries in all formats for Australia.) His batting average is one of the highest in Test cricket history. (Note: Calculated from batsmen who have batted a minimum of twenty innings.)

Smith made his Test debut against Pakistan in July 2010 at Lord's. His first Test century came during the fifth match of the 2013 Ashes series when he scored 138 not out. His highest score of 239 came against the same team during the 2017–18 series at the WACA Ground, Perth. Smith has scored Test centuries at eighteen different cricket grounds, including thirteen at venues outside Australia. In terms of centuries, he has been most successful against England (13) and India (11). As of December 2024, he ranks second in the list of most centuries by an Australian in Tests. (Note: He is behind Ricky Ponting (41).) He topped the ICC Test Rankings for the best batsman in the years 2015, 2016 and 2017; on 30 December 2017 he achieved a rating of 947, the second highest of all time after Don Bradman (961). As a result of his involvement in the 2018 Australian ball-tampering scandal, Smith was subsequently banned from all forms of cricket, except club level, for a year in March 2018.

Smith made his ODI debut against West Indies in February 2010. He did not bat in the match but took two wickets for 78 runs. His first century in the format came against Pakistan at the Sharjah Cricket Stadium in October 2014; he was named the man of the match for his match-winning innings of 101. His highest ODI score of 164 came against New Zealand at the Sydney Cricket Ground in December 2016; he captained Australia in the match which they won by 68 runs. Smith has scored his ODI centuries at eight different cricket grounds, including two at venues outside Australia, one each against Pakistan, India and South Africa. He has scored twelve centuries in ODIs and is in fifth position in the ODI centuries list for Australia.

He has played 67 Twenty20 International (T20I) matches without scoring a century; his highest score in the format is 90. As of January 2026, he is joint-11th in the list of players who have scored the most centuries in international cricket.

== Key ==
- * – Remained not out
- † – Man of the match
- ‡ – Captain of Australia in that match

== Test centuries ==
Test centuries scored by Steve Smith
No.	Score	Against	Pos.	Inn.	Test	Venue	H/A/N	Date	Result	Ref
1	138*	England	5	1	5/5	The Oval, London	Away	21 August 2013	Drawn	
2	111 †	England	5	1	3/5	WACA Ground, Perth	Home	13 December 2013	Won	
3	115	England	5	1	5/5	Sydney Cricket Ground, Sydney	Home	3 January 2014	Won	
4	100	South Africa	6	1	1/3	SuperSport Park, Centurion	Away	12 February 2014	Won	
5	162*	India	5	1	1/4	Adelaide Oval, Adelaide	Home	9 December 2014	Won	
6	133 ‡ †	India	4	2	2/4	The Gabba, Brisbane	Home	17 December 2014	Won	
7	192 ‡	India	4	1	3/4	Melbourne Cricket Ground, Melbourne	Home	26 December 2014	Drawn	
8	117 ‡ †	India	4	1	4/4	Sydney Cricket Ground, Sydney	Home	6 January 2015	Drawn	
9	199 †	West Indies	3	1	2/2	Sabina Park, Kingston	Away	11 June 2015	Won	
10	215 †	England	3	1	2/5	Lord's, London	Away	16 July 2015	Won	
11	143 †	England	3	1	5/5	The Oval, London	Away	20 August 2015	Won	
12	138 ‡	New Zealand	3	3	2/3	WACA Ground, Perth	Home	13 November 2015	Drawn	
13	134* ‡	West Indies	4	1	2/3	Melbourne Cricket Ground, Melbourne	Home	26 December 2015	Won	
14	138 ‡	New Zealand	4	2	2/2	Hagley Oval, Christchurch	Away	20 February 2016	Won	
15	119 ‡	Sri Lanka	3	2	3/3	Singhalese Sports Club Cricket Ground, Colombo	Away	13 August 2016	Lost	
16	130 ‡	Pakistan	4	1	1/3	The Gabba, Brisbane	Home	15 December 2016	Won	
17	165* ‡ †	Pakistan	4	2	2/3	Melbourne Cricket Ground, Melbourne	Home	26 December 2016	Won	
18	109 ‡	India	3	3	1/4	Maharashtra Cricket Association Stadium, Pune	Away	23 February 2017	Won	
19	178* ‡	India	3	1	3/4	JSCA International Stadium Complex, Ranchi	Away	16 March 2017	Drawn	
20	111 ‡	India	3	1	4/4	HPCA Stadium, Dharamshala	Away	25 March 2017	Lost	
21	141* ‡ †	England	4	2	1/5	The Gabba, Brisbane	Home	23 November 2017	Won	
22	239 ‡ †	England	4	2	3/5	WACA Ground, Perth	Home	14 December 2017	Won	
23	102* ‡	England	4	3	4/5	Melbourne Cricket Ground, Melbourne	Home	26 December 2017	Drawn	
24	144 †	England	4	1	1/5	Edgbaston Cricket Ground, Birmingham	Away	1 August 2019	Won	
25	142 †	England	4	3	1/5	Edgbaston Cricket Ground, Birmingham	Away	1 August 2019	Won	
26	211 †	England	4	1	4/5	Old Trafford, Manchester	Away	4 September 2019	Won	
27	131 †	India	4	1	3/4	Sydney Cricket Ground, Sydney	Home	7 January 2021	Drawn	
28	145*	Sri Lanka	4	1	2/2	Galle International Stadium, Galle	Away	8 July 2022	Lost	
29	200*	West Indies	4	1	1/2	Perth Stadium, Perth	Home	30 November 2022	Won	
30	104	South Africa	4	1	3/3	Sydney Cricket Ground, Sydney	Home	4 January 2023	Drawn	
31	121	India	4	1	1/1	The Oval, London	Neutral	7 June 2023	Won	
32	110 †	England	4	1	2/5	Lord's, London	Away	28 June 2023	Won	
33	101	India	4	1	3/5	The Gabba, Brisbane	Home	14 December 2024	Drawn	
34	140	India	4	1	4/5	Melbourne Cricket Ground, Melbourne	Home	26 December 2024	Won	
35	141 ‡	Sri Lanka	4	1	1/2	Galle International Stadium, Galle	Away	29 January 2025	Won	
36	131 ‡	Sri Lanka	4	2	2/2	Galle International Stadium, Galle	Away	6 February 2025	Won	
37	138 ‡	England	5	2	5/5	Sydney Cricket Ground, Sydney	Home	4 January 2026	Won	

== One Day International centuries ==
ODI centuries scored by Steve Smith
No.	Score	Against	Pos.	Inn.	S/R	Venue	H/A/N	Date	Result	Ref
1	101 †	Pakistan	3	1	85.59	Sharjah Cricket Stadium, Sharjah	Neutral	7 October 2014	Won	
2	104 †	South Africa	4	2	92.85	Melbourne Cricket Ground, Melbourne	Home	21 November 2014	Won	
3	102* ‡ †	England	3	2	107.36	Bellerive Oval, Hobart	Home	23 January 2015	Won	
4	105 †	India	3	1	112.90	Sydney Cricket Ground, Sydney	Home	26 March 2015	Won	
5	149 ‡ †	India	3	2	110.37	WACA Ground, Perth	Home	12 January 2016	Won	
6	108 ‡	South Africa	3	1	100.93	Kingsmead Cricket Ground, Durban	Away	5 October 2016	Lost	
7	164 ‡ †	New Zealand	3	1	104.46	Sydney Cricket Ground, Sydney	Home	4 December 2016	Won	
8	108* ‡ †	Pakistan	3	2	103.84	WACA Ground, Perth	Home	19 January 2017	Won	
9	131	India	3	1	99.24	M. Chinnaswamy Stadium, Bengaluru	Away	19 January 2020	Lost	
10	105 †	India	3	1	159.09	Sydney Cricket Ground, Sydney	Home	27 November 2020	Won	
11	104 †	India	3	1	162.50	Sydney Cricket Ground, Sydney	Home	29 November 2020	Won	
12	105 †	New Zealand	3	1	80.15	Cazalys Stadium, Cairns	Home	11 September 2022	Won	

== Summary ==
Results involving Smith's centuries
Total	Format	Won	Lost	Draw/Tie	Win %	Lost %	Draw/Tie %
37	Test	25	3	9	67.57%	8.11%	24.32%
12	ODI	10	2	0	83.33%	16.67%	0%
