= Dustin Melton =

South African cricketer (born 1995)

Personal information
- Full name: Dustin Renton Melton
- Born: 11 April 1995 (age 31); Harare, Zimbabwe
- Batting: Right-handed
- Bowling: Right-arm fast

Domestic team information
- Years: Team
- 2019–2022: Derbyshire (squad no. 13)
- First-class debut: 29 August 2019 Derbyshire v Australians
- Twenty20 debut: 13 September 2020 Derbyshire v Nottinghamshire

Career statistics
Competition	First-class	Twenty20
Matches	11	4
Runs scored	51	–
Batting average	5.66	–
100s/50s	0/0	–/–
Top score	15	–
Balls bowled	1,169	78
Wickets	19	4
Bowling average	40.63	31.00
5 wickets in innings	0	0
10 wickets in match	0	0
Best bowling	4/22	2/37
Catches/stumpings	3/–	4/–
- Source: Cricinfo, 25 September 2021

Dustin Renton Melton (born 11 April 1995) is a Zimbabwean cricketer who plays for Derbyshire.

== Work ==
He made his first-class debut on 29 August 2019, for Derbyshire against Australia, during Australia's tour of England. He made his Twenty20 debut on 11 September 2020, for Derbyshire in the 2020 t20 Blast.
