= Australian cricket team in England in 2019 =

The Australia national cricket team toured England between May and September 2019 to play in the 2019 Cricket World Cup, the Ashes and tour matches against Worcestershire and Derbyshire. In the Cricket World Cup, Australia failed to defend the title they won in 2015 and were knocked out in the semi-finals.

Cricket Australia named a 25-man preliminary squad for the Test series. Ahead of the first Test, they were scheduled to play against the Australia A team. However, this match was replaced by a four-day, intra-squad warm-up match, with Brad Haddin and Graeme Hick named as mentors of the two 12-man teams. Australia retained the Ashes after winning the fourth Test to take an unassailable 2–1 lead in the series, but England's victory in the final Test meant the series was drawn 2–2, the first drawn Ashes series since 1972.

== Tour matches ==
=== Four-day match: Brad Haddin XII vs Graeme Hick XII ===
23–26 July 2019 (Note: While four days of play were scheduled for the match, it reached a result in three days.)
Scorecard

Brad Haddin XII (Australia)	v	(Australia) Graeme Hick XII
105 (42.5 overs); Marnus Labuschagne 41 (81); Michael Neser 4/18 (10 overs)		120 (45.1 overs); Mitchell Marsh 29 (33); Pat Cummins 5/24 (11.1 overs)
170 (55.2 overs); David Warner 58 (94); Mitchell Marsh 5/34 (11.2 overs)		156/5 (60 overs); Cameron Bancroft 93* (194); Pat Cummins 1/14 (5 overs)

Graeme Hick XII won by 5 wickets
Rose Bowl, Southampton
Umpires: Nick Cook (Eng) and Rob White (Eng)

- Graeme Hick XII won the toss and elected to field.

=== Three-day match: Worcestershire vs Australia ===
7–9 August 2019
Scorecard

Australia	v	Worcestershire
266/5d (75 overs); Travis Head 109* (173); Josh Tongue 2/46 (13 overs)		201/9d (62.5 overs); Alex Milton 74 (109); Josh Hazlewood 3/34 (15 overs)
124/2 (39 overs); Marcus Harris 67 (91); Joe Leach 1/32 (11 overs)

Match drawn
New Road, Worcester
Umpires: Hassan Adnan (Eng) and Neil Mallender (Eng)

- Worcestershire won the toss and elected to field.
- Only 13 overs of play were possible on day 3 due to rain.
- Jack Haynes (Worcestershire) made his first-class debut.

=== Three-day match : Derbyshire vs Australia ===
29–31 August 2019
Scorecard

Derbyshire	v	Australia
172 (57.2 overs); Leus du Plooy 86 (143); Michael Neser 3/31 (11 overs)		338/5d (92 overs); Mitchell Marsh 74 (118); Matthew Critchley 2/47 (13 overs)
112 (36.4 overs); Leus du Plooy 37 (56); Mitchell Starc 4/39 (10.4 overs)

Australia won by an innings and 54 runs
County Ground, Derby
Umpires: Neil Bainton (Eng) and Neil Pratt (Eng)

- Derbyshire won the toss and elected to bat.
- Dustin Melton (Derbyshire) made his first-class debut.

== Test series ==
=== 1st Test ===
1–5 August 2019
Scorecard

Australia; 284 (80.4 overs) & 487/7d (112 overs)	v	England; 374 (135.5 overs) & 146 (52.3 overs)

Australia won by 251 runs
Edgbaston, Birmingham

=== 2nd Test ===
14–18 August 2019
Scorecard

England; 258 (77.1 overs) & 258/5d (71 overs)	v	Australia; 250 (94.3 overs) & 154/6 (47.3 overs)

Match drawn
Lord's, London

=== 3rd Test ===
22–26 August 2019
Scorecard

Australia; 179 (52.1 overs) & 246 (75.2 overs)	v	England; 67 (27.5 overs) & 362/9 (125.4 overs)

England won by 1 wicket
Headingley, Leeds

=== 4th Test ===
4–8 September 2019
Scorecard

Australia; 497/8d (126 overs) & 186/6d (42.5 overs)	v	England; 301 (107 overs) & 197 (91.3 overs)

Australia won by 185 runs
Old Trafford, Manchester

=== 5th Test ===
12–16 September 2019
Scorecard

England; 294 (87.1 overs) & 329 (95.3 overs)	v	Australia; 225 (68.5 overs) & 263 (77 overs)

England won by 135 runs
The Oval, London
