= 2018 Australian ball-tampering scandal =

Cricket cheating scandal

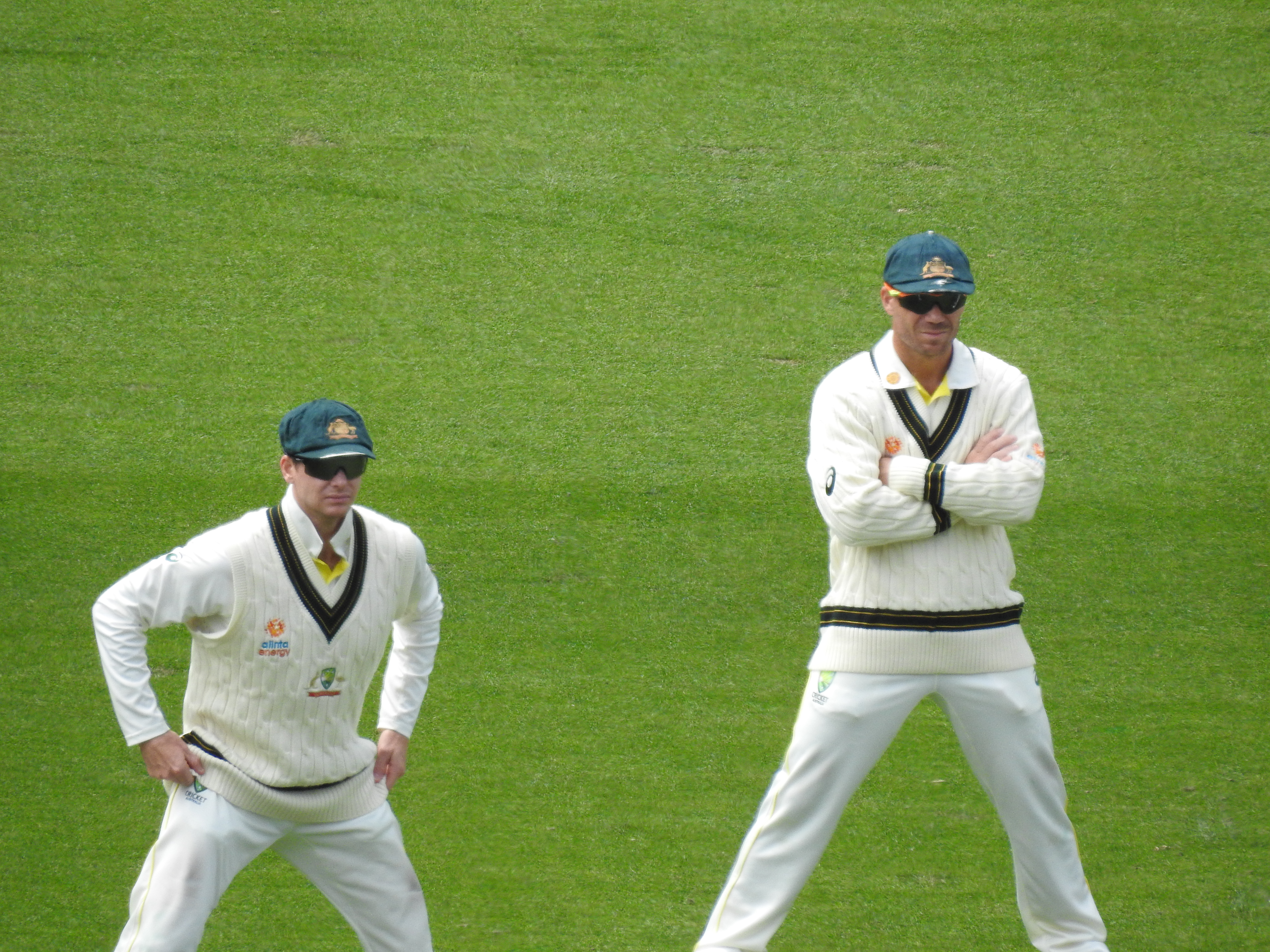
- Steve Smith (left) and David Warner (right) were banned by Cricket Australia for 12 months from international and domestic cricket while Cameron Bancroft (not shown) was banned for 9 months
- Date: 24 March 2018 (8 years, 243 days)
- Time: (South Africa Standard Time)
- Location: Newlands Cricket Ground, Cape Town, South Africa; 33°58′25″S 18°28′8″E
- Also known as: Sandpapergate
- Type: Scandal
- Cause: Trying to rough up one side of the ball with sandpaper to make it swing in flight
- Charges: David Warner and Steve Smith were banned for 12 months from international and league cricket; Cameron Bancroft was banned from domestic cricket for 9 months; Darren Lehmann stepped down as Head Coach

The 2018 Australian ball-tampering scandal, also known as Sandpapergate, was a cricket cheating scandal surrounding the Australian national cricket team. In March 2018, during the third Test match against South Africa at Newlands in Cape Town, Cameron Bancroft was caught by television cameras trying to rough up one side of the ball with sandpaper to make it swing in flight. Captain Steve Smith and vice-captain David Warner were found to be involved and both received unprecedented sanctions from Cricket Australia. Although he was found not to have been directly involved, Australia's coach, Darren Lehmann, announced he would step down from his role following the scandal. Smith was replaced by Tim Paine as captain in all formats before Aaron Finch took over from Paine in ODIs and T20Is.

In November 2026, Usman Khawaja stated in his autobiography Sabr: Finding My Way in Cricket and Life that Australia also used sandpaper at Port Elizabeth in the second Test of the 2018 series, and that every member of the touring party knew of the plans. Team mates David Warner and Chadd Sayers have since confirmed Khawaja's account as 100% accurate. Speaking later in a press conference, Australia captain Pat Cummins rejected Khawaja's account, saying it was 'utter nonsense'. Days later, Cameron Bancroft confirmed the allegations that the whole team knew, saying he withheld important information from the original investigation.

== Background ==
In March 2018, the Australia national cricket team toured South Africa to play four Test matches against the South Africa national cricket team. Entering the third Test, the series was level 1–1. On 24 March 2018, during the third day of the third Test, after the 43rd over of South Africa's second innings, Australia's Cameron Bancroft was shown on the television coverage and on screens at the ground appearing to rub the ball with a small yellow object. After Bancroft realised that he had been seen, he was again shown on the television coverage and on screens at the ground hiding the object in the front of his trousers. He was then approached by the umpires and he showed them a dark microfibre sunglass pouch from his pocket. The umpires inspected the ball and chose neither to offer the ball to the South African team to replace it if they wished, nor award them five penalty runs, the options available to the umpires under Law 41.3 of the Laws of Cricket. This indicated that the ball had not been altered in any noticeable way. At the time, South Africa was 129/2 with a 185 run lead.

At the press conference at the end of the day's play, Bancroft, accompanied by Australia's captain, Steve Smith, admitted that he was shown attempting to alter the condition of the ball using a short length of yellow adhesive tape to which dirt and grit had adhered, forming an abrasive surface. Five days later, and after an investigation into the incident by Cricket Australia, he admitted it was sandpaper, which cricketers use to maintain their bats. Smith also admitted that he knew of the plan in advance of Bancroft's actions. Smith said that the plan was made during the lunch break by the "leadership group", which he did not name. Smith said it was a "big mistake", and when questioned by the media, said that he would not be standing down as captain of the team.

Andy Pycroft, the match referee, charged Bancroft with a Level 2 offence of attempting to alter the condition of the ball. David Richardson, CEO of the International Cricket Council (ICC), charged Smith with "conduct of a serious nature that is contrary to the spirit of the game". Smith accepted the charge and the proposed sanction of two suspension points, which equated to a ban for the next Test match, four demerit points being added to his record, and was fined 100% of his match fee. Bancroft accepted the charge against him, was handed three demerit points and fined 75% of his match fee.

== Response ==
Following Smith's admission, Australia's Prime Minister at that time, Malcolm Turnbull, said it was a "shocking disappointment". He phoned Cricket Australia (CA) Board chairman David Peever directly to express that disappointment and concern, saying that the strongest action needed to be taken. The Australian Sports Commission requested that Smith stand down immediately, and the incident was widely condemned by former international players and officials.

In a press release dated 25 March 2018, CA CEO James Sutherland apologised to fans and confirmed that both Smith and Warner had agreed to stand down from their roles of captain and vice-captain respectively for the remainder of the match. In the same release, David Peever announced that Tim Paine, the team's wicket-keeper, had been endorsed by the Board of CA to step in as acting captain, and Smith and Warner would take to the field under him. South Africa went on to win the Test match by 322 runs with Australia dismissed for 107 in the fourth innings.

=== Cricket Australia investigation ===
Cricket Australia launched its own investigation into the incident, led by Executive General Manager Team Performance, Pat Howard, with CA Senior Legal Counsel and Head of Integrity Iain Roy. CA CEO James Sutherland joined the investigators in South Africa. On 27 March 2018, before the findings of the investigation were handed down, opening batsman Matt Renshaw was recalled to the squad from Australia ahead of the fourth Test.

On 27 March 2018, Sutherland announced that as a result of the preliminary investigation Smith, Warner and Bancroft had been charged with bringing the game into disrepute, suspended and would be sent home. He said that further sanctions against the three players would be announced within 24 hours, and that CA was satisfied that no one else was involved. He added that as well as Renshaw, opening batsman Joe Burns and all-rounder Glenn Maxwell were added to the squad to replace them, and confirmed that Paine had been appointed captain for the fourth Test. There was no announcement about the vacant vice-captain position. South Africa dominated the fourth Test against the depleted Australian team, winning by 492 runs to inflict Australia's second heaviest defeat by runs, and winning the series 3–1.

=== Findings ===
During a meeting on 28 March 2018, lasting over two hours, the Cricket Australia Board considered the report. The three players were sanctioned by Cricket Australia for breaching article 2.3.5 of Cricket Australia's Code of Conduct by engaging in conduct that was contrary to the spirit of the game, unbecoming of a representative, harmful to the interests of the game, and/or which brings the game into disrepute.

Warner was found to be responsible for the development of the plan to alter the condition of the ball and instructing Bancroft on how to do it, including demonstrating the technique to him. He was also found to have failed to prevent the plan being implemented, misled match officials by concealing his knowledge of the plan and not voluntarily reporting his involvement. He received a twelve-month suspension from "all international and domestic cricket" and he "will not be considered for team leadership positions ever again." Warner faced significant criticism from many individuals, including his fellow countrymen, who held him responsible for the entire scandal. In the Amazon documentary series about the scandal, The Test, Warner opened up on his struggles and road to getting the respect he lost back in the 12 month ban period he served.

Smith was found to have known of the plan but failed to take steps to prevent it, told Bancroft to conceal the sandpaper in his trousers, misled match officials and others regarding Bancroft's attempts to artificially alter the condition of the ball, and made misleading public comments regarding the nature, extent and participants of the plan. He received a twelve-month suspension "from all international and domestic cricket" and he "will not be considered for team leadership positions until a minimum of 12 months after the conclusion of [his suspension] from international and domestic cricket. Any consideration of future leadership would be conditional on acceptance by fans and the public, form and authority among the playing group."

Bancroft was found to be a party to the plan to tamper with the ball, that he carried out Warner's instructions, tried to conceal the evidence and made statements to mislead match officials and the public. He received a nine-month suspension from "all international and domestic cricket" and he "will not be considered for team leadership positions until a minimum of 12 months after the conclusion of [his suspension] from international and domestic cricket. Any consideration of future leadership would be conditional on acceptance by fans and the public, form and authority among the playing group."

As well, "[a]ll three players will be permitted to play club cricket and will be encouraged to do so to maintain links with the cricket community. In addition, all three players will be required to undertake 100 hours of voluntary service in community cricket."

Ahead of the decision, Smith and Warner had stepped down as captains of the Rajasthan Royals and Sunrisers Hyderabad respectively in the 2018 Indian Premier League (IPL). On 28 March 2018, the Board of Control for Cricket in India (BCCI) announced that neither Smith nor Warner would be able to play in the 2018 IPL.

Bancroft was contracted to play for English side Somerset in the 2018 County Championship season. On 29 March 2018, Somerset announced that "Bancroft will not be our overseas player for the 2018 season" and that "the club's best interests were at the centre of our decision". Western Australian Cricket Association CEO Christina Matthews confirmed that under their current rules Bancroft could not play grade cricket because of his suspension. However, she added, a rule change was under consideration.

Sutherland specifically addressed repeatedly broadcast footage of coach Darren Lehmann. It showed him on a walkie-talkie to 12th man Peter Handscomb at the side of the field after the visual of Bancroft was broadcast. Handscomb then ran onto the field to speak with Bancroft. Sutherland said that the CA investigators were satisfied that Lehmann "sent a message to say 'What in the hell is going on?'– he didn't use 'hell', he used another word", referring to an expletive and that he was not aware of the plan.

=== Responses from players and coach ===
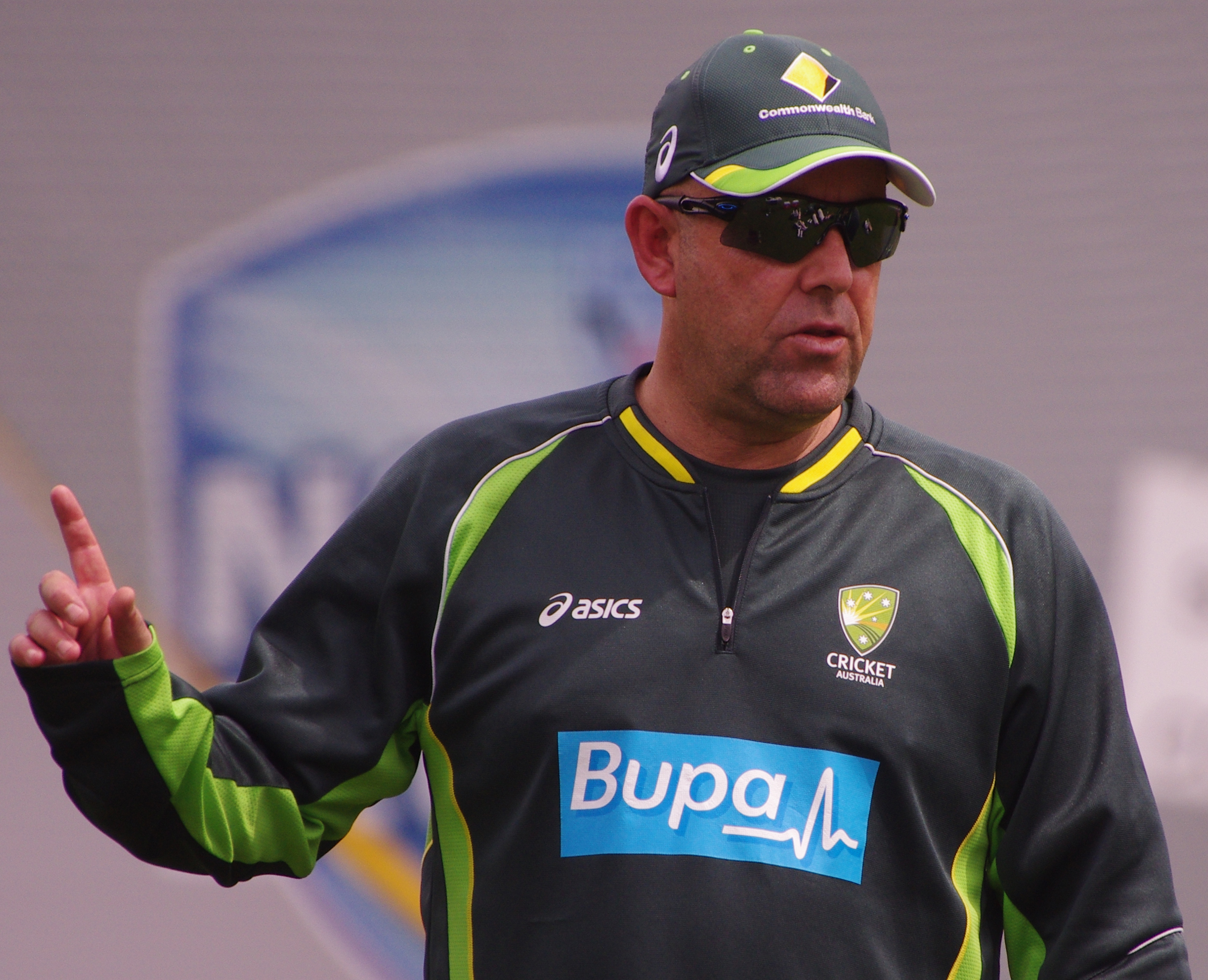
Darren Lehmann stepped down after the fourth Test against South Africa following the controversy

Warner was the first to respond publicly. In a tweet dated 29 March 2018, he apologised for his part in the incident, and took responsibility for his role in it. He said that he would spend some time with his family, friends and trusted advisers, and would make another statement in the coming days. He later arrived at Sydney Airport with his wife and two young daughters, and when confronted by media, repeated that he would make a statement in the coming days, and that his priority was to get his family home.

Bancroft arrived in Perth on 29 March 2018, and gave a press conference at the WACA. An emotional Bancroft expressed disappointment, regret and remorse, admitting that he had failed as a role model and in the eyes of the broader community, and that when confronted on the field by the umpires and media about his actions he panicked. He asked for forgiveness and said that he would be contributing back to the community.

Smith arrived in Sydney later that day. In a press conference at Sydney Airport, a tearful Smith started by saying that he had nothing to add to Cricket Australia's report. He said that as captain of the Australian cricket team, he took full responsibility, and that he had made a serious error in judgement: "It was a failure of leadership, my leadership." As well as apologising to his "teammates, to fans of cricket all over the world and to all Australians who are disappointed and angry", he specifically referred to the effect that the incident had on his parents, causing him to break down, and implored others faced with questionable decisions to consider their parents. He added, "I know I will regret this for the rest of my life. I'm absolutely gutted. I hope in time I can earn back respect and forgiveness."

Australia's coach Darren Lehmann was cleared by the investigation of any wrongdoing or involvement in the scandal, and said that he would not resign. Of the findings and sanctions, he said that he was "embarrassed" and "disappointed", adding that he hoped people would give all three players a second chance. However, on the same day that the three players returned home, Lehmann announced that he would step down from his role after the conclusion of the fourth Test in Johannesburg. He said in his statement that after watching the press conferences of Bancroft and Smith, "the feeling is that Australian cricket needs to move forward and this is the right thing to do."

On 31 March 2018, an emotional Warner gave a press conference in Sydney. In it, he described his actions as "inexcusable" and "deeply regrettable". He apologised for the breach of trust and his actions, accepting full responsibility for the part he played in the incident, and said that the next twelve months would be a tough and emotional time for him. His priority at this time would be the well-being of his family. While he hoped to play for Australia again, he was resigned for it not to happen. He said he would spend the coming weeks and months looking at himself "as a man", and would seek advice and expertise to make "serious changes". He supported a CA investigation into the culture of the Australian cricket side. When asked, he said that he would sit down with family, friends and advisers before deciding on his playing future. Some noted that he deflected multiple questions about whether he was the ringleader of the plan or others' involvement in it.

=== Disputing the charges and sanctions ===
In the press release announcing the findings and sanctions, Cricket Australia summarised the review process.

"The Code of Conduct process in this instance is as follows:

- A report is lodged by the CEO with the Head of Integrity;
- A review is completed by the Head of Integrity; A Notice of Charge (in conjunction with the report) is provided to the player which includes a specific charge under the Code of Conduct and offers the proposed sanctions;
- If the player accepts the charge and proposed sanctions, the matter is completed;
- If the player disputes either the charge or sanctions, there is a hearing before a CA Commissioner;
- The player may appeal the outcome of that hearing, and if so there is a hearing before an Appeals Commissioner (who is selected from the remaining CA Commissioners)."

It was reported on 31 March 2018 that Bancroft had sought legal advice and was considering his options. It was further reported on 1 April 2018 that all three had sought legal advice and were considering their actions, and importantly that while they all acknowledged erring in Cape Town, they had not formally accepted or challenged their charges or their sanctions issued by CA.

It was also reported that Smith and Warner were expected to push for a relaxation of the sanctions, particularly to allow them to play domestic cricket in Australia and overseas. James Sutherland of CA had previously said that the legal advice they had received was that they did not have jurisdiction requiring other national cricketing bodies to enforce the sanctions. "Under the code we didn't have any clear authority over domestic matches played overseas," he said. "It was talked about but we ascertained based on the legal advice that we didn't have that clear authority."

On 4 April 2018, Steve Smith confirmed that he would not challenge the sanctions. In a tweet, he said "I would give anything to have this behind me and be back representing my country. But I meant what I said about taking full responsibility as Captain of the team. I won't be challenging the sanctions. They've been imposed by CA to send a strong message and I have accepted them."

Also on 4 April 2018, Cameron Bancroft announced that he had advised CA that he accepted the sanction. He tweeted "Today I lodged the paperwork with Cricket Australia and will be accepting the sanction handed down. I would love to put this behind me and will do whatever it takes to earn back the trust of the Australian public. Thank you to all those who have sent messages of support."

On 5 April 2018, David Warner announced that he had accepted the CA sanctions. In a tweet, he said "I have today let Cricket Australia know that I fully accept the sanctions imposed on me. I am truly sorry for my actions and will now do everything I can to be a better person, teammate and role model."

Cricket Australia, in a press release dated 5 April 2018, confirmed that "Smith, Bancroft and Warner have officially advised Cricket Australia they have accepted the charges and sanctions, and no hearings will be required." CA CEO James Sutherland added that "These are significant penalties for professional cricketers. They were not imposed lightly. We know the players will return to playing the game they love, and in doing so, we hope they rebuild their careers and regain the trust of fans."

=== Cultural review ===
When announcing the initial findings against Bancroft, Smith and Warner on 27 March 2018, James Sutherland announced that there would also be a deeper review of the "culture and conduct" of Australia's professional cricket teams. The terms of reference of that inquiry would be to "find a means by which supporters of Australian cricket and the wider community can effectively refresh their commitment to the sport". Further details of the review would be forthcoming, but it would seek input from "relevant experts", especially to determine how the culture of the Australian men's test side arrived at the point at which it has found itself. Former Australian captain, selector and CA Board member Allan Border welcomed the review, saying that "The Australian cricket team itself is not a popular cricket team, and a lot of their antics on the field have upset a lot of people."

On 6 April 2018, Cricket Australia chairman David Peever announced that former Test batsman Rick McCosker would chair an independent review into cultural, organisational and governance issues, and a "player-driven process to set out a charter setting out standards for improved player behaviour and expectations of the Australian men's national side". He was expected to be joined by two former players and two current players on a panel, with that quartet unnamed at the time. That process would form part of the wide-ranging review, which would provide recommendations to the Cricket Australia board. Peter Collins, Director of the Centre for Ethical Leadership and a consultant on ethics, leadership and organisational change would act as a "facilitator" for the process. Peever added that the review will take "whatever time is necessary".

The chief executive of the ICC, Dave Richardson, addressed a news conference on 27 April 2018 about harsher punishments for ball-tampering and other misbehaviour.

== Responses to the investigation and sanctions ==
Before the start of play of the fourth Test between Australia and South Africa on 30 March 2018, newly appointed Australian captain Tim Paine, with the support of his players, approached South African captain Faf du Plessis. After the national anthems were played, both teams shook hands on the field as a gesture of goodwill and respect. Paine hoped that this would become a ritual that symbolises the new direction and attitude his team would be taking after the fallout from Cape Town.

While no one contended that the charges and findings against Bancroft, Smith and Warner were not justified, many argued that the sanctions were unprecedented, and that there were flaws in the Cricket Australia (CA) description of the incident. Some did not separate the event—an attempt at ball tampering—from the wider charge brought against the trio of bringing the game into disrepute.

On 29 March 2018, the Australian Cricketers Association (ACA), which represents the professional first-class cricketers of Australia, released a statement setting out "a number of glaring and clear anomalies in the process to date which causes the ACA to query the severity and proportionality of the proposed sanctions." It went on to say that "The ACA continues to provide welfare and legal support to all players" and that "All Australians would understand the right of the players to receive advice from their advisers, peers and family and the time necessary to ensure the sanctions are fair and proportional." Some see this as the ACA foreshadowing a challenge to CA over the process and sanctions.

Du Plessis, who was found guilty of ball tampering in 2013 and again in 2016, sent Smith a text message expressing his sympathy. He said that "he's one of the good guys and he's just been caught in a bad place". He agreed when asked if he thought that the sanctions were too harsh. He noted that the sanctions imposed by CA were far greater than those imposed by the ICC for the same incident, and may send a message to the ICC that "maybe they need to sharpen up."

Shane Warne, former Australian Test bowler who served a one-year ban for breaching the CA drug code in 2003, condemned the trio for engaging in "premeditated cheating", but believed that the public reaction to the incident resulted in excessive penalties being handed down by CA. English cricket commentator Mark Nicholas wrote "Clearly the captaincy had to go, and equally clearly the vice-captaincy. The punishment that has followed has been extremely severe, and I cannot help but think of Smith and Bancroft."

Former Indian captain Sachin Tendulkar argued that the right decision had been made to uphold the integrity of the game, adding "Winning is important but the way you win is more important." However he defended them, saying that the Australian cricketers have dealt with enough criticism. He also urged media and cricket fans to spare thoughts for their families and that they should be given some breathing space.

Former South African player Herschelle Gibbs said, "Hard scenes watching the interviews. Having been through it all, take it on the chin and live with the consequences but remain true to yourself."

Former Australian captain and commentator Ian Chappell said that CA were right to ban Smith and Warner for twelve months, adding that he did not expect Smith would captain Australia again because he had lost the respect of the players. On the duration of the ban, he said "if they would have only given six months to them and they tried to play in Australia's next summer, the booing and crowd reaction would have been so bad. It would have been very hard for the players and it would not have been a very good situation for Cricket Australia."

Former England captain Michael Vaughan thought the bans too harsh, but noted that CA had sent a message to players. Former Australian batsman Tom Moody believed that the punishment did not fit the crime. Indian commentator Harsha Bhogle said that "I honestly do not believe any other country would have handed its captain and lead player a one-year ban for attempted ball-tampering." Meanwhile, former Indian batsman and commentator Sanjay Manjrekar was not surprised by the sanctions. Other cricketers came out in support of the banned players, saying that punishment was too harsh, including Harbhajan Singh, Russel Arnold, Michael Venuto and Adam Hollioake.

Gautam Gambhir, the former captain of the IPL side Delhi Daredevils commented that the sanctions imposed on Smith and Warner are quite harsh, and suspected that both may have paid for their roles in a 10-month pay dispute with CA that was resolved in August 2017. In a tweet he asked the Australian media and the public to spare thoughts for the families of the disgraced cricketers rather than mocking them. Gambhir also said that "I may be quite emotional but Smith doesn't look to me a cheat."

Some criticised CA for its handling of the incident. Former Australian captain Michael Clarke believed that there was more to the incident than CA CEO James Sutherland had said, tweeting "The truth, The full story, Accountability and Leadership- until the public get this Australian cricket is in deep shit!" and that "To [sic] many reputations on the line for the full story not to come out. Cape Town change room is a very small place!" Michael Vaughan was similarly unconvinced, suggesting that Cricket Australia has only made things worse for itself by finding that only three players were involved. Former England wicket-keeper Matt Prior said the official explanation didn't match up with his experiences of how teams work. Former England all-rounder Andrew Flintoff was skeptical that other Australian players, particularly the bowlers, were not involved. Former England batsman Kevin Pietersen was unconvinced that coach Darren Lehmann did not know of the plan, while BBC broadcaster Jonathan Agnew believed that there were contradictions in the official narrative.

In December 2018, in an interview with Adam Gilchrist, Smith attributed the origins of the scandal to an incident following the team's loss to South Africa at the 2016 Hobart Test, in which Cricket Australia's then-CEO James Sutherland and then-General Manager of High Performance Pat Howard entered the Australian dressing rooms after the game and told the team "we don’t pay you to play, we pay you to win."

In 2022, Warner's manager James Erskine claimed that the Australian team were "told" to tamper with the ball following the 2016 Hobart Test, also stating that "there was far more than three people involved in this thing" and that David Warner had "protected Cricket Australia" and "protected his fellow players" on Erskine's advice "because at the end of the day no one wanted to hear any more of it".

== Commercial fallout ==
From the outset, many of Cricket Australia's commercial sponsors and partners, including 2018 South African tour naming rights sponsor Qantas, Twenty20 naming rights sponsor Sanitarium, One Day International and Big Bash League naming rights sponsor KFC, domestic Test match naming rights sponsor Magellan Financial Group, Lion XXXX, the Commonwealth Bank, and Bupa expressed their disappointment and shock over the incident. Many demanded a comprehensive explanation from CA, and demanded that they take steps to protect the long term reputation of the sport they had invested in.

On 29 March 2018, Magellan Financial Group terminated its three-year naming rights sponsorship agreement with CA in response to the ball-tampering scandal. The contract had two more seasons to run, and was estimated to be worth AU$20 million.

The incident came as CA was negotiating television broadcast rights to all forms of the game for the next six seasons, estimated at one point to be valued at greater than AU$900 million. Bidding has not been as high as CA expected, and some expect that the ball tampering incident may further affect those negotiations.

=== Player contracts ===
On 28 March, Smith and Warner were banned from the 2018 edition of the IPL. Both the players were going to make A$2.4 million.

On 11 April 2018, Cricket Australia announced the list of 20 players who have been awarded national contracts for 2018–19. Bancroft, Smith and Warner were not on that list, and they were not mentioned in the media release.

In April 2018, Surrey head coach and former Australian cricketer Michael Di Venuto stated that his county would be willing to sign either Smith or Warner during their ban from international cricket.

=== Individual sponsorships ===
The LG Electronics company in Australia announced that they had chosen not to renew their personal sponsorship of Warner on 27 March 2018, citing "recent events". Warner had been in a commercial arrangement with LG since 2014. That arrangement was in its final weeks and was being considered for renewal at the time of his suspension. As well as this incident, his behaviour came under the spotlight during the first Test of the tour after the dismissal of South African batsman AB de Villiers. He was then involved in a highly publicised personal and escalating verbal altercation with South African batsman Quinton de Kock as they were leaving the field. Warner's teammates intervened to separate them. Both were charged by the match referee and penalised. Earlier in this Test, Warner was involved in a heated exchange with a spectator after being dismissed in Australia's first innings. The spectator was ejected from the ground.

On 29 March 2018, sporting apparel company ASICS terminated their commercial arrangements with Warner and Bancroft. The Commonwealth Bank terminated their brand ambassador arrangement with Smith, as did Sanitarium for whom Smith was an ambassador for their Weet-Bix product.

== Return to cricket ==
Bancroft was the first of the three banned players to return to Australian professional cricket. On 30 December 2018, he represented the Perth Scorchers in the 2018–19 Big Bash League season. In the match he scored two runs from three balls, with the Hobart Hurricanes going on to win the game by six wickets.

The bans on Smith and Warner ended on 29 March 2019, coinciding with the date of the fourth One Day International (ODI) match of Australia's series against Pakistan in the United Arab Emirates, however neither made their international return until the first match of the 2019 Cricket World Cup. The trio made their returns to the Test arena at Edgbaston on 1 August in the first Test of the 2019 Ashes series, with Smith's scores of 144 and 142 earning him the man of the match award as Australia beat England by 251 runs. The players had sandpaper waved at them by the English fans during the match. Smith's Ashes performance was hailed as one of the best of all time, making 774 runs across four Tests, whereas Warner played all five Tests but scored a total of just 95 runs, the worst ever such aggregate by an opener. Bancroft was dropped after averaging 11 in the first two matches, never to return to international cricket. He was dropped by his Sheffield Shield team the following March.

In February 2020, Smith and Warner were named in Australia's limited overs squads for their tour to South Africa. They both played in the opening Twenty20 International (T20I) match of the tour, the first time they had represented Australia in South Africa since their bans.

Cricket Australia reportedly reopened an investigation into the scandal in 2021 after Bancroft hinted that some bowlers also knew about it.

== Documentary ==
A docu-series The Test: A New Era for Australia's Team based on the return of the Australian team after the 2018 ball-tampering scandal was streamed on Amazon Prime Video on 11 March 2020 with 8 episodes.

== 2026 developments ==
In November 2026, retired Australian batsman Usman Khawaja published his autobiography, Sabr: Finding My Way in Cricket and Life, which included his account of the 2018 ball-tampering scandal. Khawaja wrote that the whole team had knowledge of the ball-tampering plan, and that it was also employed at the previous test in Gqeberha.

Team mates David Warner and Chadd Sayers agreed with Khawaja's account, calling it '100% accurate' and thanking Khawaja for revealing his account.

Speaking in a press conference on 13 November, Australian captain Pat Cummins rejected Khawaja's account, calling it 'utter nonsense' and saying Khawaja had been too casual with teammates' lives.

On the morning of 18 November, Cricket Australia CEO Todd Greenberg announced plans to set up an "independent forum" at which players and staff could provide confidential testimony. The forum, headed by a retired judge or other respected figure, would report to the Cricket Australia board who would then determine what information to release to the public, seeking "to be as transparent as [they] possibly can" while respecting witness confidentiality.

That evening, Cameron Bancroft released a 4000-word statement that the entire Australian team was aware of the plan to tamper with the ball, initially published in The West Australian before being republished in Cricinfo, The Times, and other media outlets globally. He stated "I withheld important details, including when the use of sandpaper began, how long it went on for, and the involvement and awareness of others." Bancroft stated that Cummins' press conference was the "final straw" that prompted him to disclose his account, stating "What I saw, experienced and lived with - not only him, but everyone else on that tour in South Africa - is not the public account he gave in his press conference and in the years previously when he has spoken on this time."

== See also ==
- Deflategate, American football ball-tampering incident
- Spitball, a baseball pitch where a substance has been illegally added to the ball to alter its flight characteristics
- Corked bat, a baseball bat that has been modified with foreign substances
