= Usman Khawaja =

Australian cricketer (born 1986)

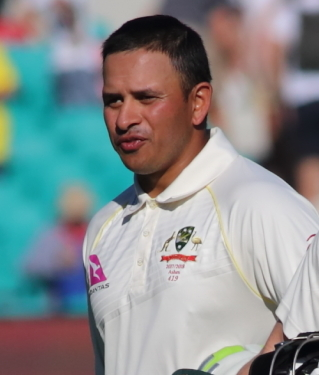
- Khawaja in January 2018

Personal information
- Full name: Usman Tariq Khawaja
- Born: 18 December 1986 (age 39); Islamabad, Pakistan
- Nickname: Uzzie
- Height: 177 cm (5 ft 10 in)
- Batting: Left-handed
- Bowling: Right-arm off break
- Role: Top-order batter

International information
- National side: Australia (2011–2026)
- Test debut (cap 419): 3 January 2011 v England
- Last Test: 4 January 2026 v England
- ODI debut (cap 199): 11 January 2013 v Sri Lanka
- Last ODI: 6 July 2019 v South Africa
- ODI shirt no.: 1
- T20I debut (cap 80): 31 January 2016 v India
- Last T20I: 9 September 2016 v Sri Lanka
- T20I shirt no.: 1

Domestic team information
- Years: Team
- 2007/08–2011/12: New South Wales
- 2011–2012: Derbyshire
- 2011/12–2021/22: Sydney Thunder
- 2012/13–2025/26: Queensland
- 2014: Lancashire
- 2016: Rising Pune Supergiant
- 2018: Glamorgan
- 2021: Islamabad United
- 2022/23–present: Brisbane Heat

Career statistics
Competition	Test	ODI	FC	LA
Matches	88	40	229	133
Runs scored	6,229	1,554	15,589	5,494
Batting average	42.95	42.00	43.18	45.03
100s/50s	16/28	2/12	43/74	14/32
Top score	232	104	232	166
Balls bowled	18	–	174	–
Wickets	0	–	1	–
Bowling average	–	–	111.00	–
5 wickets in innings	–	–	0	–
10 wickets in match	–	–	0	–
Best bowling	–	–	1/21	–
Catches/stumpings	68/–	13/–	181/–	49/–
Medal record
Men's cricket
Representing Australia
ICC World Test Championship
Winner	2021–2023
Runner-up	2023–2025
- Source: ESPNCricInfo, 23 March 2026

Usman Tariq Khawaja (Urdu: عثمان خواجہ; born 18 December 1986) is a Australian international cricketer who represented the Australia national cricket team in all formats from 2011 to 2026. Khawaja still plays for the Brisbane Heat in the Big Bash League. Khawaja played domestic cricket for New South Wales from 2007 to 2012, before moving to Queensland where he would later become state captain and end his domestic career with them.

Born in Pakistan, Khawaja moved to Australia at age four. He made his first-class cricket debut for New South Wales in 2008 and played his first international match for Australia in January 2011. He played for the Sydney Thunder from 2011 to 2022, with whom he won the 2015–16 Big Bash League season, winning man of the match in the final, top scoring with 70 runs. He has played county cricket in the United Kingdom and briefly played in both the Indian Premier League and Pakistan Super League Twenty20 tournaments. Khawaja captained Queensland in first class cricket and from 2015 to 2024, captaining them to the 2020–21 Sheffield Shield title, batting No. 4. Khawaja opened the batting and scored a hundred, winning man of the match for the Queensland team that won the 2013–14 Ryobi One-Day Cup final.

Khawaja played ODI cricket sporadically from 2013 to 2019 and only played T20I cricket for one season in 2016. He played in both the 2016 T20 World Cup and the 2019 Cricket World Cup. A left-handed batter, Khawaja spent the majority of his international career batting at No. 3 or opening the batting.

Khawaja was a member of the Australian team that won the 2021–2023 ICC World Test Championship. He was the second-highest scoring batsman in the 2021–2023 ICC World Test Championship with 1,621 runs, the highest by an Australian batsman. In 2023, he won the ICC Test Cricketer of the Year Award.

Khawaja retired from international cricket during the 2025/26 Ashes, announcing his farewell before the fifth Ashes Test at the Sydney Cricket Ground. He bid farewell after the Sydney Test, helping Australia win the Ashes 4-1 over England.

== Early and personal life ==
Usman was born in Islamabad, Pakistan, to Tariq Khawaja and Fozia Tariq. His family emigrated to New South Wales when he was four. He became the first Australian of Pakistani origin to represent Australia in cricket when he made his debut in the 2010–11 Ashes series. He is a qualified commercial and instrument-rated pilot, completing a bachelor's degree in aviation from the University of New South Wales before he made his Test debut. He attained his basic pilot licence before his driving licence. He was educated at Westfields Sports High School in Fairfield West.

Usman Khawaja announced his engagement on 14 December 2016 on his Facebook page. and subsequently married his wife Rachel on 6 April 2018. Rachel Khawaja (née McLellan) converted to Islam prior to their wedding. Khawaja is a dual Australian and Pakistani citizen.

=== Views ===
In December 2023, during a training session for Australia's first test match of the series against Pakistan, Khawaja wore shoes on which the words "All lives are equal" and "freedom is a human right" were written in the colours of the Palestinian flag. The ICC warned Khawaja that it would sanction him if he continued to wear the shoes. During the first test match against Pakistan at Perth, he covered the writing on his shoes with tape and wore black armbands. The ICC ruled that the wearing of black armbands breached its clothing and equipment regulations. Khawaja stated that he "respect[s] the ICC and the rules and regulations" and will request the ICC apply "consistency in how they officiate".

Khawaja made a post on Instagram using the hashtags "#inconsistent and #doublestandards," in which he pointed out several examples of other cricketers with symbols on their bats, such as 'Om' sticker for a Hindu player, or Bible verses and crosses for others. In response to Khawaja's issues with the ICC, former cricketer and commentator Michael Holding denounced the ICC for "hypocrisy and lack of moral standing," for allowing the players to "take the knee for Black Lives Matter" and having their stumps covered with LGBTQ colours.

Australia captain Pat Cummins also supported Khawaja, stating that "We really support Uzzy. He's standing up for what he believes and I think he's done it really respectfully."

Khawaja supported commentator Peter Lalor after Lalor was sacked by his radio station in February 2025 for criticising Israel's actions during the Gaza war in social media posts. Khawaja said "Standing up for the people of Gaza is not antisemitic nor does it have anything to do with my Jewish brothers and sisters in Australia, but everything to do with the Israeli government and their deplorable actions". Khawaja refused an interview with Lalor's former radio station in June because of its treatment on Lalor.

== Domestic and T20 career ==
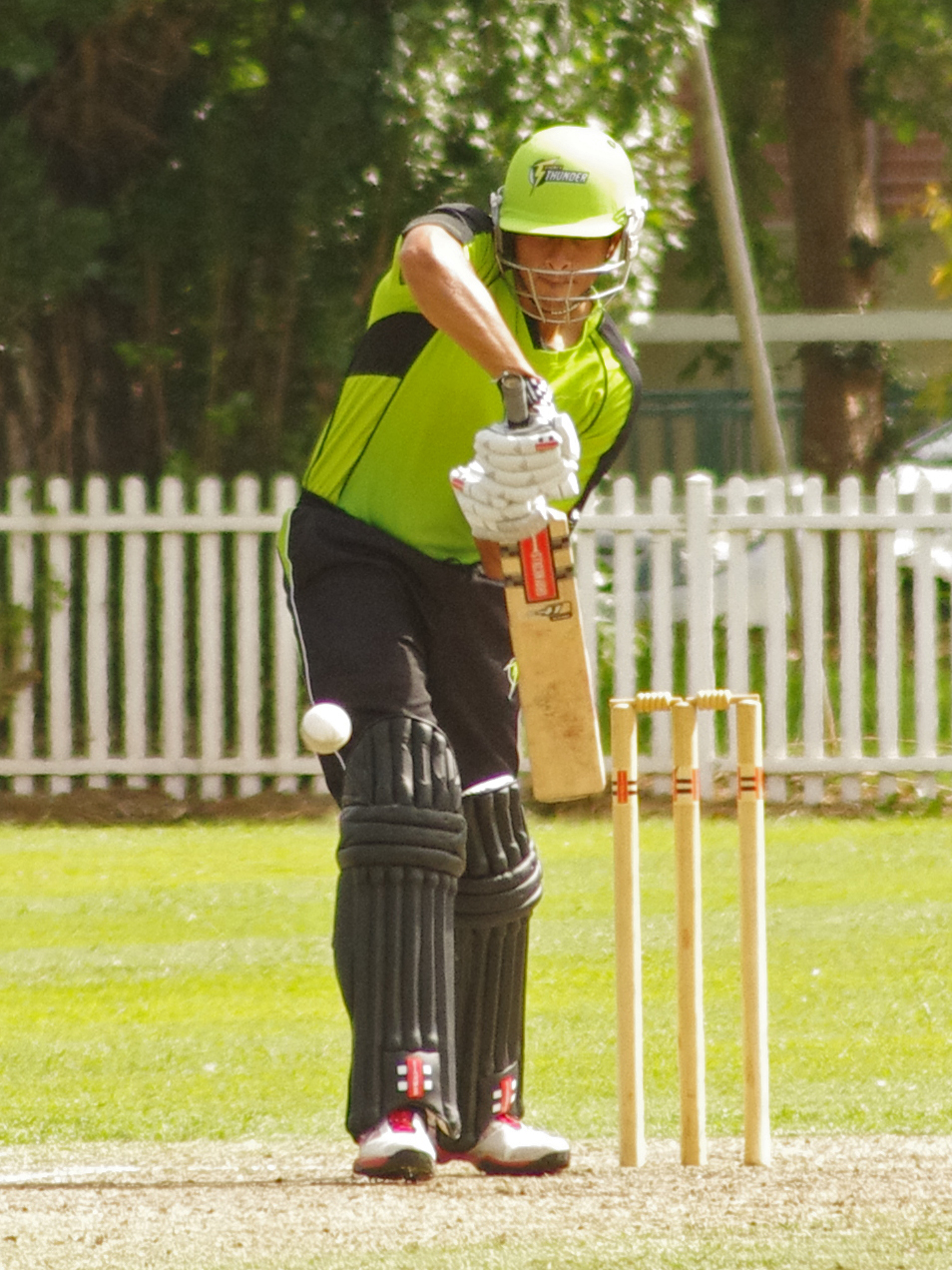
Khawaja in 2011

A left-handed top order batsman, Khawaja was awarded Player of the Australian Under-19 Championship in 2005 and also played for Australia in the 2006 U-19 Cricket World Cup in Sri Lanka as an opening batsman.

He made his first-class debut for the New South Wales Blues in 2008. In the same year, he hit consecutive double centuries for the NSW Second XI—a feat never before achieved by a NSW player. On 22 June 2010 it was announced by Cricket Australia that Usman Khawaja would be a part of the Australian touring squad to play Pakistan in a two Test series in England.

Around 2012, Khawaja moved to Queensland cricket team, citing a fresh challenge to invigorate his career.

From 2011 to February 2022, Khawaja played for the Sydney Thunder in the Big Bash League. In BBL05, he was the second highest run scorer, scoring 345 runs at an average of 172.50. This included two centuries (one of which was in the semifinal against the Adelaide Strikers) and a knock of 70 runs in 40 balls in the finals versus the Melbourne Stars as the Thunder sealed their maiden BBL title. He was named captain of the Thunder ahead of the BBL11 (2021/22 season). However, due to an overlap between the BBL and the 2021/22 Men's Ashes, Khawaja was only available to lead the Thunder for two fixtures at the back end of the season.

Khawaja signed a contract to play for Derbyshire in the 2011 English domestic season. He played in four County Championship matches, averaging 39.87 with the bat and scoring a century (135) against Kent. After his county stint, he made five further Test appearances in 2011, scoring one half-century (65) against South Africa. He was dropped from Australia's Test team after the home series against New Zealand, making way for Shaun Marsh upon Marsh's return from injury.

Lancashire signed Khawaja as an overseas player for the 2014 county season for all formats. Khawaja scored 86 runs on his debut against Durham but in vain as Lancashire lost by 27 runs.

He plays club cricket for Valley District Cricket Club in Brisbane.

In August 2015, Khawaja was appointed as captain of the Queensland cricket team, replacing previous captain James Hopes.

During IPL 2016, Khawaja was signed by the now-defunct Rising Pune Supergiants as a replacement player for Faf du Plessis, who was ruled out of the competition due to a finger injury. He scored 127 runs from 6 innings at a strike rate of 127.00 and an average of 21.16.

In April 2018, he was signed by Glamorgan County Cricket Club to play in the 2018 Vitality Blast tournament in England. In April 2021, he was signed by Islamabad United to play the rescheduled matches in the 2021 Pakistan Super League.

In February 2022, Khawaja opted out of his contract with the Sydney Thunder, citing "family reasons".

On 29 June 2022, Khawaja was signed by the Brisbane Heat and appointed captain for the upcoming Big Bash season.

Shortly after his international retirement, Khawaja played on for Queensland during the 2025-26 season, following which he retired from Sheffield Shield, his last match being at the Gabba versus Western Australia .

== International career ==
Khawaja was selected as part of the 17-man Australian squad for the 2010–11 Ashes series. During the third Test, Ricky Ponting fractured his finger and Khawaja was named as a stand-by if Ponting could not recover in time. He was subsequently selected in the Australian cricket team to play in the fifth Test against England in Sydney on 3 January 2011. He batted at 3 and made 37 and 21 in a heavy innings defeat, (left arm orthodox spin bowler Michael Beer made his debut in the same match) . On 3 January 2011, Khawaja became the 419th Australian to be presented with an Australian Cricket Test baggy green cap. Khawaja became the first Muslim and first Pakistani-born Australian player to play Test cricket for Australia, and only the seventh foreign-born cricketer to do so in the last 80 years.

Before the third Test against India in March 2013, Australia suspended Khawaja, along with James Pattinson, Shane Watson and Mitchell Johnson following a breach of discipline. Michael Clarke, the captain, revealed that the step had been taken as a result of repeated infractions which led to Watson flying back home and contemplating Test retirement. Some former players reacted with astonishment at the decision taken by the team management. Khawaja made his Test return in the second Test of the 2013 Ashes series, replacing Ed Cowan.

In the first Test against New Zealand on 5 November 2015; his first Test in more than two years, he scored his maiden Test century, scoring 174 runs with 16 fours and 2 sixes. He made this return in his tenth Test in the coveted number 3 position, helping Australia to an emphatic victory.

He made his Twenty20 International debut for Australia against India on 31 January 2016.

During the 2015–16 season, Khawaja was in spectacular form for Australia and his domestic T20 franchise the Sydney Thunder, with many pundits hailing his renaissance as a batsman since being dropped from the Australian team in 2013 and recovering from an injury in 2015. He also switched to using Kookaburra equipment. In August 2016, Khawaja endured one of the lowest ebbs in test career when he was dismissed twice in a day's play for 11 runs and duck in both innings by Dilruwan Perera during Australia's second test match of the series against Sri Lanka at Galle International Stadium and question marks were raised about Khawaja's inability to play spin especially in subcontinental conditions. His vulnerability against spin also played a major reason in removing him from the team ahead of the third and the final test match of the series.

Additionally, Khawaja set a record for becoming the first ever batsman to score a Test century in an innings of a Day-Night Test match on home soil and still has the record for the second highest individual score in a Day-Night Test innings.

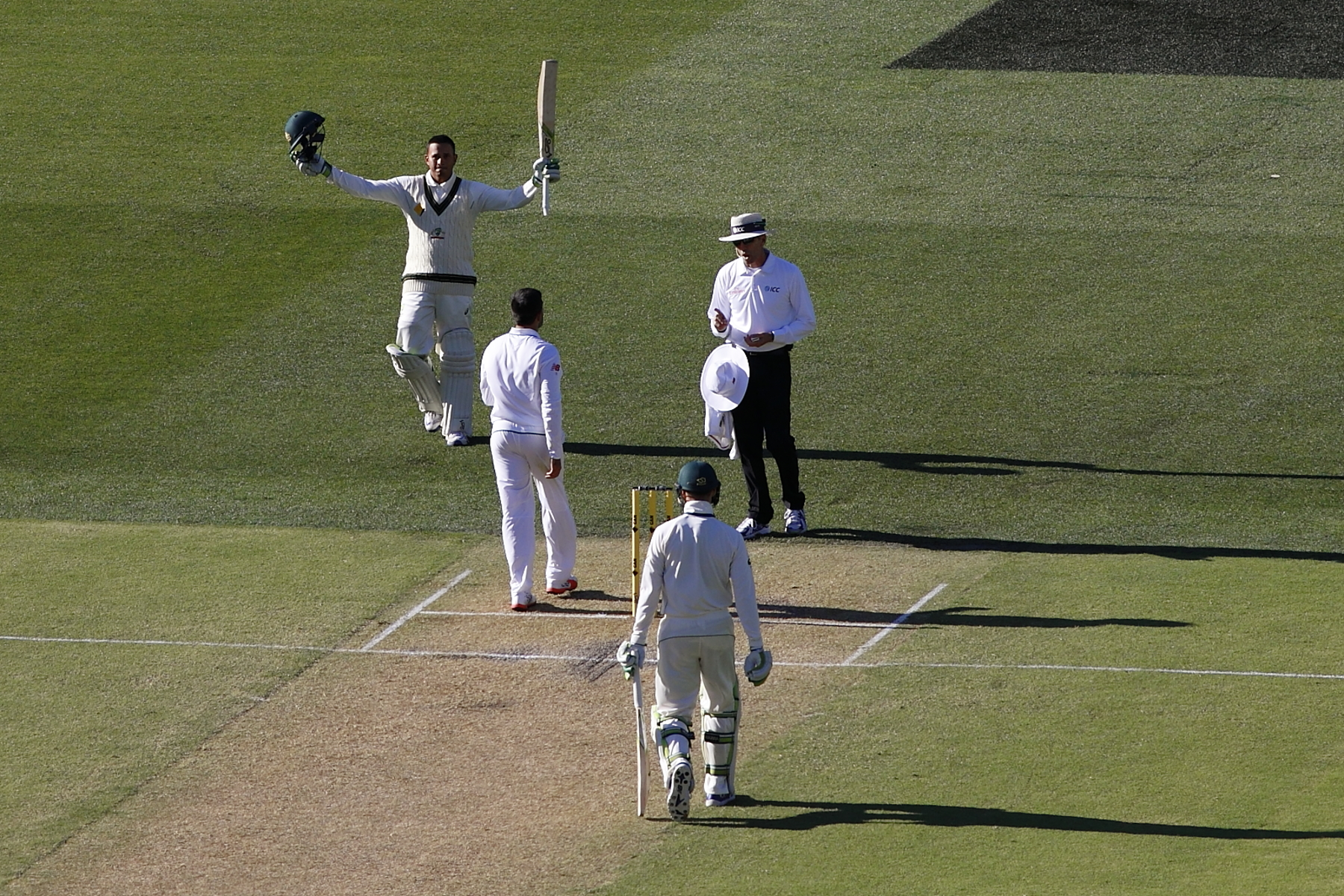
Khawaja celebrates after scoring a century against South Africa in Adelaide (2016).

Khawaja played his first Test match against the country of his birth, Pakistan, on 15 December 2016 at the Gabba. When asked about the significance of the match, he described a moment of confusion outside the change rooms:

Funnily enough I was waiting downstairs and I needed the change room locker to be opened for us and I was just waiting and the Queensland Cricket lady came down. She was like 'Oh, you need the locker rooms open?' I went 'yes please' and she started walking to the Pakistani change room. I was like, 'No, I'm that way, thank you'.

In January 2017, Khawaja dabbed in celebration of his half-century scored in a Test match against Pakistan in Sydney. His move received mixed reactions, with some praising it, while others accused him of disrespecting his opponents.

In April 2018, he was awarded a national contract by Cricket Australia for the 2018–19 season. He played a match saving innings against Pakistan in the first Test in 2018 at Dubai, where he played a fluent innings of 141 under immense pressure especially in the fourth innings opening the batting while chasing a mammoth total of 462 runs and for his efforts, he received player of the match award. He showed his glimpses of using proper technique and shot selection to counter the spin attack in the test match in Dubai in 2018 which turned out to be a turning point in his career and he buried the past nightmares of being a weak batsman against spin with a prolific batting effort by revamping his approach in both innings to save the test match for Australia from a brink of huge defeat.

In April 2019, he was named in Australia's squad for the 2019 Cricket World Cup. In Australia's final group-stage match, against South Africa, Khawaja picked up a hamstring injury, ruling him out of the rest of the tournament. Matthew Wade was named as cover for him.

In July 2019, he was named in Australia's squad for the 2019 Ashes series in England. In the series, he returned the scores of 13, 40, 36, 2, 8 and 23, failing to convince. Therefore, for the fourth Ashes Test, Steve Smith replaced Khawaja after returning from concussion, while Marnus Labuschagne retained his place in the team.

On 16 July 2020, Khawaja was named in a 26-man preliminary squad of players to begin training ahead of a possible tour to England following the COVID-19 pandemic. He was not included in the final squad for the tour.

=== Comeback to international cricket ===
In January 2022, Khawaja made a comeback to international cricket after a long hiatus, in the 4th Ashes Test at SCG; and made twin centuries in the match, posting scores of 137 and 101* respectively.

Khawaja was then selected for the Australian tour of Pakistan. He was the highest run scorer in the series scoring 496 runs at an average of 165.33, a performance which earned him player of the series. He scored 97 runs in the first innings of the first test. He then scored 160 runs in the first innings of the second test and 44* in the second innings. In the first innings of the third test, he scored 91 followed by 104* in the second innings, helping Australia win the final match of the series and as such the series as a whole.

In January 2023, in the third Test against South Africa, he completed his 4000 Test runs, and struck his career-best 195 runs. Khawaja capped off his return to international cricket by picking up the Shane Warne Test Player of the Year at the Allan Border Medal ceremony, ahead of Travis Head and Steve Smith. Khawaja was also awarded the Community Impact Award at the same event.

=== 2023 Ashes ===
Khawaja continued his run of good form in the 2023 Ashes series, in England, scoring 496 runs @ 49.60, the highest runscorer for either team, with the bulk of his runs coming in the first 2 tests, both of which Australia won on the way to retaining the ashes with a 2–2 series result. Khawaja made a statement in the first test at Edgbaston by scoring his first test century on English soil during Australia's first innings, finally dismissed for 141 off 321 deliveries after being set up by a bamboozling yorker delivery from Ollie Robinson as the latter eventually gave him an aggressive sendoff indicating Khawaja being the main resistance for England's possible opportunity of winning the first test. Khawaja was also triggered by interesting field placement strategy deployed by England captain Ben Stokes which made him to throw his wicket away possibly at a critical juncture of the match. Khawaja again made runs in the second innings which was critically important in the context of the match where Australia were set a challenging target of 282. He frustrated the English opponents with his old school style of playing test cricket by scoring 65 off 197 deliveries before being bowled by Stokes when he attempted to play a shot which edged his bat and castled the stumps. His innings eventually sealed the deal for Australia as the visitors won the closely fought contest by margin of 2 wickets courtesy of late cameos from skipper Pat Cummins and Nathan Lyon. He was awarded the player of the match for his batting heroics in the first test which guided Australia to take an early lead in the Ashes series 1-0 thereby having a psychological advantage over the home team. Khawaja also set a new milestone for becoming only the second Australian batsman ever in test history to bat in all five days and became only the thirteenth man overall to bat on each day of a five-day test match.

Despite his rich vein of form during the entirety of the Ashes he was also involved in a confrontation with members of Marylebone Cricket Club in the Lord's pavilion during the second match of the series in the wake of the infamous stumping of Jonny Bairstow, which was a talking point throughout the Ashes series. Khawaja criticised the behaviour of the MCC members, calling it disrespectful. Alongside his opening partner David Warner, Khawaja engaged in a heated exchange with MCC members as the Australians went to their dressing room at the lunch session.

Khawaja made stunning revelations about the 2023 Ashes crowd where he insisted that "the crowd this time was far worse than anything I've experienced", pointing to the constant abuse and derogatory slurs. He vented his frustrations to Wisden Cricket Monthly in an exclusive interview. He further elaborated that certain people in the crowd brought about his past failures and struggles in English conditions when he was part of the touring Australian teams of 2013 and 2019 Ashes series. He referred to crowd comments such as "you're crap, you're shit, you’'e useless, you can't score runs here", despite him being in the form of his life for the past eighteen months, especially in test format. He claimed English supporters had taken his politeness for granted, comparing them to a rowdy football crowd and highlighting the aggression and abuse hurled at him throughout the Ashes series.

Khawaja ended up rectifying his poor record in English conditions by aggregating a tally of 496 runs during the five-match series, including making the most of the opportunity, cashing in by letting his batting do the talking to eventually silence his critics who were bragging about Khawaja's poor record in England. His traditional batting style was contrasted to that of England's opening batsman Zak Crawley, the latter making 480 runs with a Bazball styled approach by scoring runs at a brisk pace.

=== 2023/24 Summer - 2024/25 India ===
Khawaja was named in the squad for the 2023 series against Pakistan, following which he tallied 220 runs @ 36.66 across 6 innings, with a highest of 90, helping Australia claim a 3-0 series win. He made significant contributions in the 2024 series against West Indies, scoring 139 runs @ 46.33 across 2 innings, with a highest of 75, helping Australia retain the trophy but West Indies drew the series 1-1.

Khawaja endured a lean patch of form across the middle of 2024, tallying 88 runs @ 22 across 2 innings in the 2024 New Zealand series. He also endured a tough series during the 2024 series against India, mustering only 184 runs across 10 innings with a low batting average of 20.44, a high score of 57. He was largely troubled and undone by Indian pacer Jasprit Bumrah, the most senior pro of the India bowling unit, targeted across his pads and his weaker areas, culminating in Bumrah dismissing Khawaja 6 times across 8 innings. Khawaja indicated that Bumrah had been the toughest bowler that he had ever faced in his career. Khawaja made an impactful but steadfast innings of 41, during Australia's challenging chase of 162 during the fourth innings of the decisive fifth test match at the Sydney Cricket Ground, acing the chase with ease as Australia claimed the Border-Gavaskar Trophy with 3–1 series win, and in doing so, Australia also guaranteed a spot to play in the 2025 ICC World Test Championship final.

=== Sri Lanka 2025 - WTC Final 2025 ===
Usman Khawaja rediscovered his form during the first match of the 2025 series against Sri Lanka, scoring his first Test century since 2023. He remained unbeaten on 147 at the end of the rain-affected first day before going on to score his maiden Test double century of 232. At 38 years and 42 days, Khawaja became the second-oldest Australian to score a Test double century, behind Don Bradman, who achieved the feat at 39 years and 149 days. His 232 also made him the first Australian to score a Test double century in Sri Lanka and surpassed Justin Langer’s previous Australian record of 166 in Sri Lanka. He also broke Michael Slater’s record of 219 for the highest individual score by an Australian against Sri Lanka in Tests. Khawaja became only the second Australian, after Allan Border, to score Test centuries in India, Pakistan and Sri Lanka. With his previous century in the United Arab Emirates, he became the only Australian to have scored Test centuries in all four countries. He also shared a record 266-run third-wicket partnership with Steve Smith, surpassing the previous Australian record in Asia of 222, set by Kim Hughes and Allan Border against India in 1979. He finished the series with 295 runs @ 147.50 across 3 innings over 2 matches, helping Australia win 2-0 but endured a poor match at the 2025 World Test Championship final, scoring 0 and 6 as Australia conceded the title to South Africa.

=== West Indies 2025 - Ashes 2025/26 and retirement ===
Khawaja endured a tough tour against the West Indies 2025 series, tallying 119 runs @ 19.50, with a high score of 47 but was responsible for building a platform for the middle order by taking the shine off the ball, and spending time at the crease, helping Australia win 3-0 against the West Indies. He was later named in the squad for the 2025-26 Ashes series. Khawaja endured a back spasm during the Perth test, which got Travis Head promoted at the top and scored an aggressive 123, clinching the win for Australia. When Khawaja was rested for the Gabba test to regain his fitness, he was left out of the Adelaide Test. But due to Steve Smith's last-minute illness, he got a lifeline recall, scoring 82 and 40 across the match, resulting in Australia regaining the Ashes.

On 2 January 2026, Khawaja announced he would retire from international cricket after the fifth Ashes test. He bid farewell after the Sydney Test, helping Australia win the Ashes series 4-1, while scoring 176 runs @ 25, with a high score of 82.

== Career achievements and centuries ==
- Wisden Cricketers of the Year: 2024
- ICC Men's Test Cricketer of the Year: 2023
- Shane Warne Men's Test Player of the Year: 2023
- ICC Men's Test Team of the Year: 2022, 2023
- Australian Domestic Player of the Year: 2011

=== International centuries ===
Khawaja has scored 16 centuries in Test matches and two in One Day Internationals. His highest Test score of 232 came against Sri Lanka at Galle International Stadium, Galle in January 2025 and his highest ODI score of 104 came against India at JSCA International Stadium, Ranchi in March 2019.

==== Test centuries ====
List of Test centuries scored by Usman Khawaja
No.	Score	Opponent	Pos.	Venue	Date	Result	Ref
1	174	New Zealand	3	The Gabba, Brisbane	5 November 2015	Won	
2	121	New Zealand	3	WACA Ground, Perth	13 November 2015	Drawn	
3	144	West Indies	3	Melbourne Cricket Ground, Melbourne	26 December 2015	Won	
4	140	New Zealand	3	Basin Reserve, Wellington	12 February 2016	Won	
5	145	South Africa	1	Adelaide Oval, Adelaide	24 November 2016	Won	
6	171	England	3	Sydney Cricket Ground, Sydney	12 January 2018	Won	
7	141	Pakistan	2	Dubai International Cricket Stadium, Dubai	7 October 2018	Drawn	
8	101*	Sri Lanka	3	Manuka Oval, Canberra	1 February 2019	Won	
9	137	England	5	Sydney Cricket Ground, Sydney	5 January 2022	Drawn	
10	101*	England	5	Sydney Cricket Ground, Sydney	5 January 2022	Drawn	
11	160	Pakistan	2	National Stadium, Karachi	12 March 2022	Drawn	
12	104*	Pakistan	1	Gaddafi Stadium, Lahore	21 March 2022	Won	
13	195*	South Africa	1	Sydney Cricket Ground, Sydney	4 January 2023	Drawn	
14	180	India	2	Narendra Modi Stadium, Ahmedabad	10 March 2023	Drawn	
15	141	England	2	Edgbaston Cricket Ground, Birmingham	16 June 2023	Won	
16	232	Sri Lanka	1	Galle International Stadium, Galle	30 January 2025	Won	

==== One Day International centuries ====
List of ODI centuries scored by Usman Khawaja
No.	Score	Opponent	Pos.	Venue	Date	Result	Ref
1	104	India	2	JSCA International Stadium, Ranchi	8 March 2019	Won	
2	100	India	1	Arun Jaitley Stadium, New Delhi	13 March 2019	Won	

== Post-retirement from cricket ==
In November 2026, Khawaja wrote in his autobiography Sabr: Finding My Way in Cricket and Life that Australia first used sandpaper at Port Elizabeth in the second Test of the 2018 series, and that that every member of the touring party knew of the plans.
