= Sabr: Finding My Way in Cricket and Life =

2026 autobiography by Usman Khawaja

- Author: Usman Khawaja
- Genre: Autobiography
- Publisher: Penguin Books Australia
- Publication date: 10 November 2026
- Media type: Print
- Pages: 448
- ISBN: 9781761344268
- Website: www.penguin.com.au/books/sabr-9781761344268

Sabr: Finding My Way in Cricket and Life is a 2026 autobiography written by Australian former cricketer Usman Khawaja. Published on 10 November 2026 by Penguin Books Australia, the memoir covers Khawaja's childhood, experiences with racism and identity, and career in Australian cricket.

It includes Khawaja's previously undisclosed account of the 2018 Australian ball-tampering scandal in South Africa, prompting renewed public discussion of the incident following the book's release. Before the release, Khawaja revealed he was diagnosed with rheumatoid arthritis at the beginning of his career, and that the book detailed how this had affected his career.

== Background and publication ==
Khawaja, who was born in Pakistan and raised in Australia, became the first Muslim to play Test cricket for Australia in 2011. The title Sabr refers to the Arabic word for patience. Khawaja did not engage a ghost writer or professional author when writing, saying “I didn't think anyone could encapsulate my story like I could because no one has been through the same journey in Australian cricket like I have."

== Contents ==
Before the release Khawaja revealed he was diagnosed with rheumatoid arthritis at the age of 22. The disorder was so debilitating he struggled to walk 10 metres to the bathroom due to severe knee pain. He managed his diagnosis and managed to continue playing cricket through regular injections and medication.

Chapter 17, titled 'Sandpaper', covers the 2018 Australian ball-tampering scandal and reveals information that is inconsistent with the findings of the official investigation by Cricket Australia. Officially, only Steve Smith, David Warner, and Cameron Bancroft were found to have had knowledge of the cheating, with only those three receiving financial penalties and bans. Khawaja wrote that the entire team had knowledge of the cheating, and that it was also employed, but never discovered, in the previous Test at Gqeberha.

== Reception and response ==
Chief executive of Cricket Australia, Todd Greenberg, stated that there will not be a renewed investigation into the 2018 scandal, and that Khawaja's claims in the book contradict the recollections of others.

David Warner posted an Instagram video following the book's release showing his support for Khawaja's disclosure, saying his account is "100% accurate". Chadd Sayers, who was a bowler on the Sandpapergate tour, also backed up Khawaja's account.

Khawaja posted an Instagram video after revealing his account of the cheating scandal prior to the book's release, stating he had not "thrown anyone under the bus", and that he had promised Warner, who was his childhood friend, that he would reveal his account of the incident post-retirement. Khawaja stated he wanted to go public at the time of the incident and again in 2021, but suspended captain Steve Smith persuaded him not to.

External videos
- Pat Cummins press conference

In a press conference on 13 November, Australian captain Pat Cummins rejected Khawaja's account, calling it "utter nonsense" and stating that Khawaja had been too casual with teammates' lives.

On 18 November, Cameron Bancroft backed up the statements made by Warner and Sayers, stating that the whole team knew about the use of sandpaper and that he withheld important information from the original investigation..
