= Short of a length =

Short of a length (sometimes referred to as "back of a length" or "short of a good length") is a term used in the sport of cricket. It describes a delivery from the bowler that pitches short of the optimum length.

Length in cricket defines where the ball pitches on the wicket. A good length ball is one that pitches at a distance that makes it difficult for the batsman to ascertain whether to play the ball on the front foot or back foot. A bouncer is a ball that passes the batsman above chest height. A short of a length delivery is one that pitches in the area between the bouncer and good length balls.

This delivery can be dangerous for a batsman as it can bounce higher into the midriff. Also, the delivery can be extremely useful to a seam bowler. Good exponents include Stephen Harmison and Glenn McGrath.

== See also ==
- List of cricket terms
