= Sledging (cricket) =

Verbal abuse of an opposing player in cricket

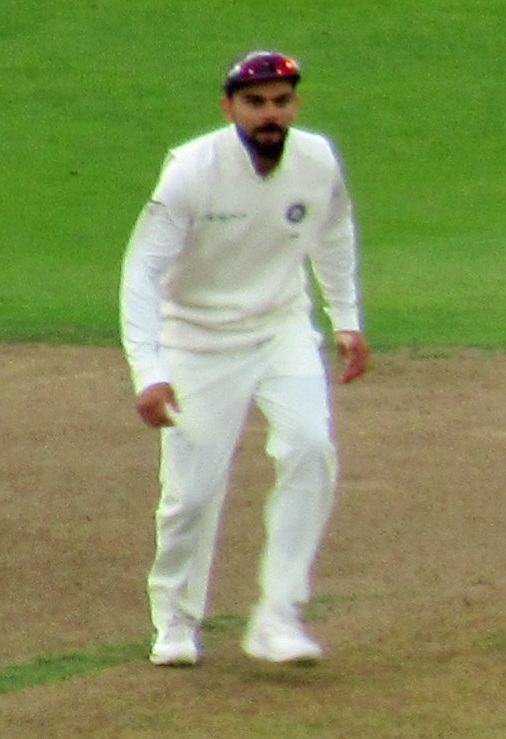
Indian cricketer Virat Kohli is known for his sledging and verbal confrontations on the field.

In the sport of cricket, sledging is the practice of deliberately insulting or verbally intimidating an opposing player. The purpose is to try to weaken the opponent's concentration, thereby causing them to underperform or be more prone to error. It can be effective because the batsman stands well within hearing range of the bowler and certain close fielders, and vice versa. The insults may be direct or may feature in conversations among fielders which are intended to be overheard by the batsman. The term has also been used in other sports, as when the tennis player Nick Kyrgios insulted his opponent, Stan Wawrinka, by referring to a purported encounter between another player and the latter's girlfriend.

There is debate in the cricketing world as to whether sledging constitutes deliberately poor sportsmanship or is simply good-humoured banter. Sledging is sometimes interpreted as abuse, and it is widely acknowledged some comments aimed as sledges do sometimes cross the line into personal abuse.

Sledging can sometimes be a humorous attempt at distraction. Former Australian captain Steve Waugh referred to the practice as one of "mental disintegration".

== Origin ==
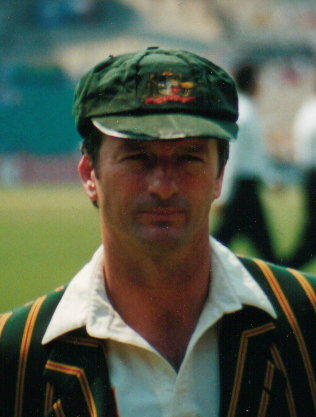
Australia's Steve Waugh has called sledging a practice of 'mental disintegration'.

Australian newspapers acknowledged "sledging" as a term in the mid-1970s. Despite the relatively recent coining of the term, the practice is as old as cricket itself, with historical accounts of witty banter between players being quite common. W. G. Grace and his brother E. M. were noted throughout their careers for being "noisy and boisterous" on the field. W. G. admitted that they used to "chaff" (i.e., tease) opponents, and this is seen as part of the gamesmanship for which E. M. and W. G. were always controversial.

According to Ian Chappell, the use of "sledging" as a term originated at Adelaide Oval in either the 1963–1964 or 1964–1965 Sheffield Shield competition. Chappell claims that a cricketer who swore in the presence of a woman was said to have reacted to an incident "like a sledgehammer". As a result, the direction of insults or obscenities at opponents became known as "sledging".

According to the BBC's Pat Murphy: "My understanding is that it came from the mid-sixties and a guy called Grahame Corling, who used to open the bowling for New South Wales and Australia … apparently the suggestion was that this guy's wife was [having an affair] with another team-mate, and when he came into bat [the fielding team] started singing "When a Man Loves A Woman", the old Percy Sledge number."

The 1974–75 Australians were labelled the Ugly Australians for their hard-nosed cricket, verbal abuse and hostile fast bowling. "Behind the batsmen, Rod Marsh and his captain Ian Chappell would vie with each other in profanity", and Tom Graveney wrote "It was an open secret that [Ian Chappell] used to encourage his players to give a lot of verbal abuse to rival batsman when they were at the wicket in an attempt to break their concentration."

West Indian batsman Viv Richards was notorious for punishing bowlers that dared to sledge him, so much so that many opposing captains banned their players from the practice. However, in a county game against Glamorgan, Greg Thomas attempted to sledge him after he had played and missed at several balls in a row. He informed Richards: "It's red, round and weighs about five ounces, in case you were wondering." Richards hammered the next delivery out of the cricket ground and into the nearby River Taff. Turning to the bowler, he commented: "Greg, you know what it looks like, now go and find it."

== International views ==
=== Australia ===
It has been pointed out (for example in the Sydney Morning Herald) that the Australian cricket team believes in playing in a more "robust" fashion than others and that it upholds a "sledging culture". As per Australian cricketer Mark Taylor, Australian fans want to watch "combative cricket". Australian batsman Ricky Ponting has argued that sledging helps get players "out of control" and "out of their comfort zone". Ponting has also said that it's "not as bad" as the average person would think. Australian all-rounder Michael Clarke has said that he "loved the aggressive approach". In response to "personal sledging" accusations against his team, Australian cricketer Steve Smith has said, "Getting personal on the field is not on, that's crossing the line in my opinion." By contrast, Australian opener Ed Cowan suggests that "all sledging is personal" adding that Australian cricketers should be "nowhere near the line".

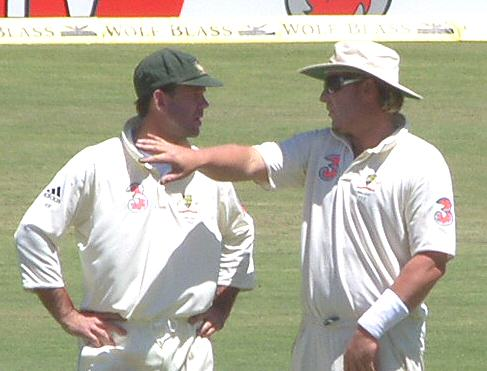
Australian cricketer Ricky Ponting (left) says sledging gets players 'out of their comfort zone'.

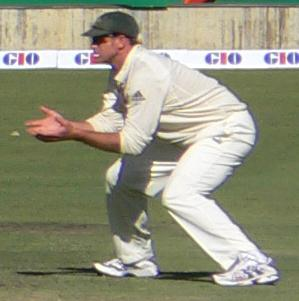
Australian cricketer Matthew Hayden, who was hired as coach of the Pakistani team in 2021 to make the side more aggressive.

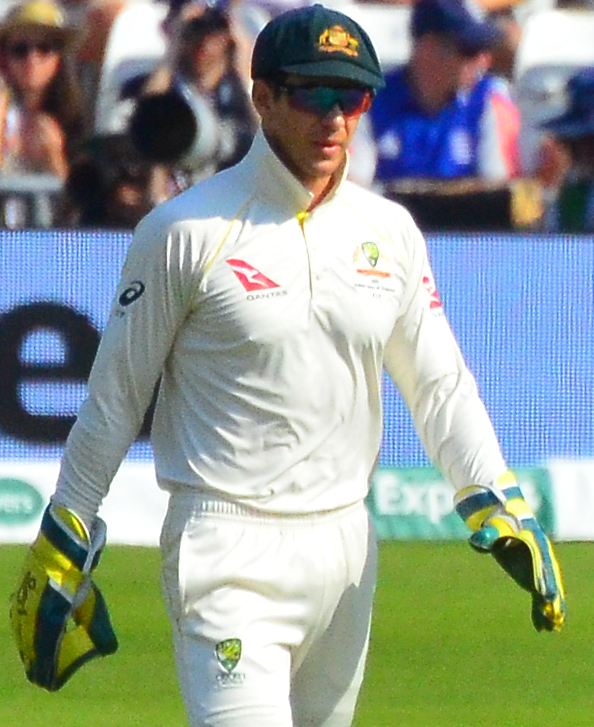
Australia's Tim Paine has been in the media spotlight for his verbal exchanges with India, Pakistan, and New Zealand.

Before the controversial Test series during Australia's Tour of South Africa in 2018 commenced, Australian spinner Nathan Lyon commented on sledging: "We know where the line is. We headbutt it, but we don't go over it." Following the 2018 Australian ball-tampering scandal, voices calling for a reformation of Australia's 'cricket culture' have emerged. Australian Prime Minister Malcolm Turnbull called for an end to sledging following the scandal. Following the outrage over the scandal, former Australian cricketer Justin Langer said that cricket would be 'dull' without sledging. Australian batsman David Warner who received a one-year ban following the controversial series, exclaimed: "I play with aggression on the field and I try not to cross that line". Former Australian cricketer and former coach of the Australian team Darren Lehmann has suggested that Australia is 'not as bad' as portrayed, adding that sledging was worse during his own times. Australian wicketkeeper Tim Paine, in captaincy as replacement for Steve Smith who received a one-year ban from the 2018 Australian ball-tampering scandal, said that his team will 'stay on the side of banter and never go to abuse.'

Australian cricketer Chris Lynn suggests that franchise cricket has helped reduce sledging as players tend to end up being in the same team. According to former Australian cricketer Mike Whitney, sledging is part of the game as long as it's not 'personal'. During India's Tour of Australia in 2018-19, Australian cricketers were 'scared' to sledge Indian Test captain Virat Kohli and 'sucked up' to him for lucrative IPL contracts, according to Michael Clarke.

In August 2019, Cricket Australia CEO Kevin Roberts announced that they will be updating the board's anti-discrimination code to add penalties including life bans for on-field slurs related to sexuality as part of its policy for 'inclusion of transgender and gender diverse players in elite cricket'. This was met with harsh criticism by Australian Prime Minister Scott Morrison who called the policy a 'sledgehammer'.

=== Bangladesh ===
Historically described as a 'timid' side, Bangladesh underwent a transformation as they grew in confidence following the 2015 Cricket World Cup, according to Bangladeshi cricketer Mashrafe Mortaza. Mortaza says that he encourages his players to 'look the opponent in the eye' while 'not overstepping a line'. He also insists that his side 'does not start a conversation' on the field. Bangladesh former cricketer and commentator Athar Ali Khan says that Bangladesh has moved out of a 'culture of backing off'.

=== England ===
England coach Trevor Bayliss expressed disapproval over sledging being caught on the stump mics, suggesting that sledging must be censored on television as it isn't a 'great thing for young kids at home watching'. In contrast with Bayliss, England cricketer Moeen Ali suggests stump mics should be turned up, in order to deter players from sledging.

Former English cricketer Bob Willis has suggested that sledging of a 'personal nature' should be reported to the match referee, with particular reference to Australian sledging directed at English players during the 2017-18 Ashes. Before England's Tour of New Zealand in 2018, former English cricketer Geoffrey Boycott called for English cricketers to 'drop' sledging. England wicketkeeper Jonny Bairstow has expressed a need for greater clarity with regard to what is deemed as 'personal', pointing out that there are so many grey areas around the 'line'.

=== India ===
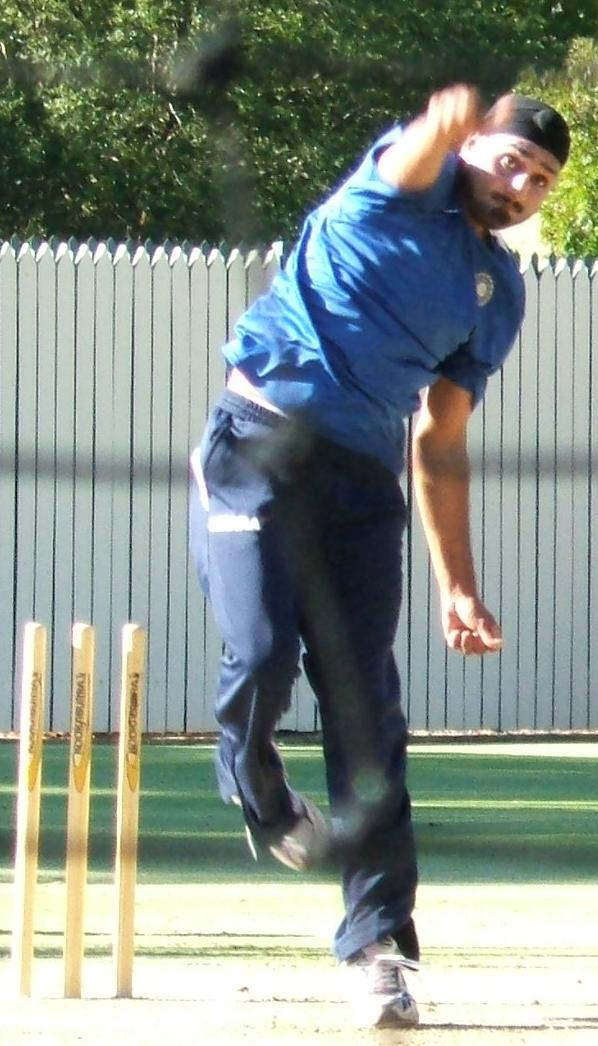
India's Harbhajan Singh has thrown light on his sledging duels with Australia's Darren Lehmann, Glenn McGrath, and Andrew Symonds.

Former Indian captain Kapil Dev laid the foundation to turn India into a competitive sledging side, according to Viv Richards. Saurav Ganguly is known to be among India's first 'aggressive' captains who employed sledging on the field. Indian batsman Virender Sehwag has said, "If there's no sledging, there won't be any enjoyment left in the game." Indian cricketer Gautam Gambhir said it's fine to do 'whatever you can to upset the opposition till the time you don't get personal.' Indian wicketkeeper MS Dhoni has described sledging as an 'art' and has said it is fair as long as a 'line' isn't crossed. Indian pacer Sreesanth has said that sledging is 'part and parcel' of the game. Indian bowler Irfan Pathan has said that sledging has a 'certain charm' about it also adding that it should be done 'within limits'. Former Indian cricketer and commentator Sunil Gavaskar explains that sledging is done to 'disrupt a cricketer's concentration'. Former Indian cricketer Mohammad Kaif has stated that sledging is fine but verbals must not extend to 'family'.

Indian cricket captain Virat Kohli said, "We take it very well and we give it back even better." Ganguly has stated that Kohli's aggression is 'two-times more' than his own. Under Kohli's captaincy, players are required to have 'top fitness, high intensity and an aggressive mindset'. Upon receiving the ICC Spirit of Cricket Award in January 2020, India captain Virat Kohli talked in support of sledging, on-field banter and intimidation adding that individuals should not be targeted 'emotionally'. Sachin Tendulkar has pointed out that aggression has become the strength of the Indian team under Kohli. Indian Test cricketer Cheteshwar Pujara said that he makes 'a lot of noise on the field' and believes that sledging 'helps the bowlers'. Indian batsman Ajinkya Rahane has compared sledging (on the cricket field) to 'car honking while driving'. Defending sledging objections against Virat Kohli and Rishabh Pant by Australian cricketers during India's Tour of Australia in 2018, former Indian batsman VVS Laxman said, "When you're playing for your country you have to play with pride, you have to play with passion."

=== New Zealand ===
Former New Zealand cricketer Adam Parore admitted to cringing when reflecting upon sledging in his own times and exclaimed that he hadn't heard the word 'humble' before 2009. Former New Zealand captain Stephen Fleming said that sledging wasn't 'always pretty' but that he was ready to take any 'advantage' for the team. New Zealand's attitude under Fleming, particularly against South Africa, has reportedly been 'nasty'. In a bid to reconnect with fans, Brendon McCullum transformed the New Zealand team into a much friendlier cricketing opposition upon taking captaincy, doing away with all sledging. McCullum said that sledging in an abusive manner was not 'authentic to being a New Zealander'. Ex-New Zealand captain Daniel Vettori has said that 'being nice suits Kiwi style', also claiming that he was never sledged by the Australians.

Following the 2015 World Cup Final between New Zealand and Australia which saw Australian wicketkeeper Brad Haddin engage in 'repeated sledging', the former publicly repudiated sledging. New Zealand cricketer Grant Elliott, who was among those targeted by Australian cricketers during the 2015 World Cup Final, commented: "You should sort cricket issues out with bat or ball, not with your mouth."

New Zealand captain Kane Williamson has been described as a 'great example for kids' by Adam Parore. Williamson was awarded the ICC Spirit of Cricket Award in 2018 with the ICC describing his behavior as 'outstanding'.

New Zealand women's captain Sophie Devine stated that sledging in women's cricket is not commonplace but it is 'witty and funny' whenever it occurs.

=== Pakistan ===
Pakistani pacer Shoaib Akhtar has shared accounts of his sledging battles with Australia's Matthew Hayden and Justin Langer.

Pakistani cricketer Imran Khan has mentioned that his players 'learnt' aggression during Pakistan's 1972-73 tour of Australia. Khan specifically mentioned Sarfaraz Nawaz among the players that 'picked up sledging' from the Australians. In 1999, the Pakistan Cricket Board lodged an official complaint to its Australian counterpart over 'persistent sledging' and the use of 'highly abusive language' against Pakistani players. Before Pakistan's Tour of Australia in 2004, then Pakistani captain Inzamam-ul-Haq made it clear that his players will 'give what they get' if subjected to sledging. Pakistani paceman Wasim Akram has emphasised that what is said on the field should remain on the field.

=== South Africa ===
South African wicketkeeper-batsman Mark Boucher exclaimed that sledging 'will never completely leave the game.'

=== Sri Lanka ===
The Sri Lankan Cricket Team has had a reputation of avoiding verbal aggression. Former Sri Lankan captain Arjuna Ranatunga called for a ban on sledging in early 2008 with particular reference to Australia's interactions with touring sides. Former Sri Lankan wicketkeeper Kumar Sangakkara drew a clear distinction between aggression 'on the field' and verbal sledging, remarking that the two are different from each other.

=== West Indies ===
The West Indies Cricket Team was famous in having a fearsome pace bowling attack during the 1980s, but rarely indulged in verbal intimidation of the opposition unless provoked. West Indies great Viv Richards said that his reaction to sledging was 'confrontational'. According to Richards, sledging is an 'inevitable part' of modern-day cricket. He further expounds that 'racial' slurring translates to crossing the line, comparing it to 'being hit in the nuts' and asserting that it is entirely unacceptable. Former West Indies wicketkeeper Deryck Murray has said that there is no room for sledging based around someone's 'race' or 'family background', adding that sledging directed towards West Indies players, particularly by Australians, during his career was sometimes 'beyond acceptable'. West Indies legend Curtly Ambrose has simply said: "I despise players who sledge. Sledging is very childish and beneath contempt."

== Recorded sledging incidents ==
=== Until 1999 ===
Incident	Players Involved	Date	Match	Part of	Description
Bastards	Douglas Jardine, Bill Woodfull	1932-33	(Australia) vs (England)	1932-33 Ashes	England captain Douglas Jardine reported swearing by Australian players to Australian captain Bill Woodfull. Woodfull responded, “Now which of you bastards called this bastard a bastard?”
Tea party	Allan Border and Robin Smith	10–14 August 1989	(England) vs (Australia)	1989 Ashes	When England cricketer Robin Smith asked for a drink, Australia's Allan Border burst out: "What do you think this is, a fucking tea party? No, you can't have a fucking glass of water, you can fucking wait like the rest of us."
Ticket please	Javed Miandad and Merv Hughes	22 January 1990	(Australia) vs (Pakistan)	Pakistani cricket team in Australia in 1989–90	One incident, as recalled by Merv Hughes, was when he was bowling to Pakistan batsman Javed Miandad, who informed the bowler that he was "too fat to be playing cricket" and "should be driving buses". After Hughes got Javed caught out, he intercepted him on his way back to the pavilion and said, "ticket please".
Play for a red inker	Steve Waugh and Graham Thorpe	8 August 1993	(England) vs (Australia)	1993 Ashes	With England's Graham Thorpe batting on 60, Australia's Steve Waugh from slip chirped, "Watch this little prick play for a red inker". A triggered Thorpe charged out of his crease to Shane Warne and was caught out.
A runner for being a fat cunt	Ian Healy and Arjuna Ranatunga	20 January 1996	(Australia) vs (Sri Lanka)	Sri Lankan cricket team in Australia in 1995-96	When Sri Lankan captain Arjuna Ranatunga called for a runner, Australia's Ian Healy verbally fired, "You don't get a runner for being a fat cunt."
Fetch	Venkatesh Prasad and Aamir Sohail	9 March 1996	(Pakistan) vs (India)	1996 Cricket World Cup	Pakistan's Aamir Sohail hit a four off India's Venkatesh Prasad, and asked him to 'fetch' the ball. Prasad responded by taking his wicket and sending him off the very next ball.
-	Glenn McGrath and Alan Mullally	29 December 1998	(Australia) vs (England)	English cricket team in Australia in 1998–99	Australian cricketer Glenn McGrath had a go at England's Alan Mullally who responded to the Australian's sledging with 'smirks and smiles'.
-	Ricky Ponting and Ijaz Ahmad	26-28 November 1999	(Australia) vs (Pakistan)	Pakistani cricket team in Australia in 1999-2000	Australia's Ricky Ponting abusively sledged Pakistani players during the Test series, and particularly batter Ijaz Ahmad during the Perth test. The Pakistan Cricket Board lodged an official complaint with Cricket Australia over the sledging.

=== 2000-2009 ===
Incident	Players Involved	Date	Match	Part of	Description
Dropped the test	Steve Waugh, Sourav Ganguly and Rahul Dravid	15 March 2001	(India) vs (Australia)	Australian cricket team in India in 2000–01	When Indian skipper Sourav Ganguly dropped a catch off Australian batsman Steve Waugh, the latter chirped: "You just dropped the Test, mate." Shortly after tea, Waugh lost his wicket to India's Harbhajan Singh, following which Indian fielder Rahul Dravid jibed and sent-off Waugh asking who gave the Test match now.
Best in the family	Mark Waugh and Jimmy Ormond	23–27 August 2001	(England) vs (Australia)	2001 Ashes	During the fifth test at the Oval, Australia's Mark Waugh, brother of the more successful Steve Waugh, jibed at England's Jimmy Ormond, a tail-end batsman, saying, "What are you even doing here? There's no way you're good enough to play for England." Ormond replied: "Maybe not...but at least I'm the best player in my family."
-	Mahela Jayawardene, Sanath Jayasuriya and Herschelle Gibbs	15–19 November 2002	(South Africa) vs (Sri Lanka)	Sri Lankan Cricket Team in South Africa in 2002-03	In response to 'organized' sledging by the South African cricket team in the first Test, the Sri Lankans identified five players in the South African squad to target during the second Test. As narrated by Sri Lanka's Mahela Jayawardene, South Africa's Herschelle Gibbs was in tears when he came out to bat and requested Sri Lanka's Sanath Jayasuriya to stop the sledging.
42 million	Kumar Sangakkara and Shaun Pollock	3 March 2003	(South Africa) vs (Sri Lanka)	2003 Cricket World Cup	Sri Lankan wicketkeeper Kumar Sangakkara got under the skin of South African batsman Shaun Pollock as he came out to bat during a World Cup match between South Africa and Sri Lanka. After Sangakkara built pressure on Pollock by making him aware of the gravity of the situation, the Sri Lankan finished his sledge with, "Forty-two million supporters right here, all of them depending on Shaun."
Ask your wife	Glenn McGrath and Ramnaresh Sarwan	12 May 2003	(Cricket West Indies) vs (Australia)	Australian cricket team in the West Indies in 2002–03	Glenn McGrath attempted to sledge the 21-year-old rookie West Indian batsman Ramnaresh Sarwan, asking him, "What does Brian Lara's dick taste like?" The West Indian responded saying, "I don't know, better ask your wife." This agitated McGrath whose wife was suffering from cancer at the time (which Sarwan was unaware of). McGrath snapped back, "If you fucking mention my wife again, I'll fucking rip your fucking throat out". This over-reaction caused Sarwan to laugh in his face, enraging McGrath still further and causing the Australian to be warned by the umpire and later fined.
Hated by both teams	Nasser Hussain, Muttiah Muralitharan and Kumar Sangakkara	10–14 December 2003	(Sri Lanka) vs (England)	English cricket team in Sri Lanka in 2003-04	English cricketer Nasser Hussain delivered several verbals to Sri Lankan cricketer Muttiah Muralitharan during a match in the latter's hometown Kandy. When it was the Englishman's turn to bat, he was greeted by Sri Lanka's Kumar Sangakkara who jibed: "What's it like to be hated by both teams?" This was a taunt referring to Hussain being at odds with his own teammates in addition to facing resentment from the hosts.
Mind the windows	Andrew Flintoff and Tino Best	26 July 2004	(England) vs (Cricket West Indies)	West Indian cricket team in England in 2004	As West Indian cricketer Tino Best, a tail-ender batsman with a reputation for hitting sixes, got ready to face the forthcoming delivery, England cricketer Andrew Flintoff, fielding in the slips, told Best to 'mind the windows'. The sledge worked for Flintoff, as Best was stumped in a wild attempt to smash the ball out of the park.
Ghost in the Castle	Darren Gough and Shane Watson	23 June 2005	(England) vs (Australia)	Australian cricket team in England in 2005	After Australian cricketer Shane Watson slept on the floor of teammate Brett Lee's room at Lumley Castle in Durham following rumours of a ghost, England player Darren Gough mocked the Australian batsman the following day on the cricket field, pulling off a ghost impression and saying to Watson, "Don't worry, you can sleep in my bed tonight."
Tarzan	Shoaib Akhtar and Andrew Flintoff	22 November 2005	(Pakistan) vs (England)	England cricket team in Pakistan in 2005-06	After repeated taunts from Pakistan's Shoaib Akhtar branding him 'fat', England all-rounder Andrew Flintoff said to the pacer: "Shoaib, it's all right, you look like Tarzan, but you bowl like Jane". Flintoff was dismissed by Akhtar shortly after he came out to bat.
-	Chris Gayle and Michael Clarke	18 October 2006	(Cricket West Indies) vs (Australia)	2006 ICC Champions Trophy	West Indian Chris Gayle appeared agitated and touched shoulders with Michael Clarke while exchanging words. The sledge backfired as a throw by Chris Gayle ended up costing the team runs. Chris Gayle was fined 30% of his match fee.
Well played	Danish Kaneria and Brian Lara	21 November 2006	(Pakistan) vs (Cricket West Indies)	West Indian cricket team in Pakistan in 2006-07	After Pakistani leg-spinner Danish Kaneria bowled a googly at West Indies' Brian Lara, which was played back to the bowler, Kaneria jibed, 'Well played, Brian' to which Lara responded, 'Okay, sir.'. The Trinidadian batter then smashed the Pakistani bowler for three sixes in a row. Lara scored 216 runs while Kaneria claimed 5 wickets for 181 runs.
The Eiffel Tower	MS Dhoni and André Nel	16 December 2006	(South Africa) vs (India)	Indian cricket team in South Africa in 2006–07	Among the multiple South African tail-enders sledged by MS Dhoni, Andre Nel (standing at six feet four inches) was brought to the spotlight, with the Indian keeper chirping at him, "Come on guys. Let's bring the Eiffel Tower down".
The Guts	André Nel and S. Sreesanth	17 December 2006	(South Africa) vs (India)	Indian cricket team in South Africa in 2006–07	After South African bowler André Nel jibed at Indian tail-ender Sreesanth, allegedly saying, "I can smell blood. You do not have the guts.", the latter smashed the bowler for a six over his head followed by an enthusiastic jig.
Bat in my hand	Andrew Flintoff and Yuvraj Singh	19 September 2007	(India) vs (England)	2007 World Twenty20	Abusive banter between English cricketer Andrew Flintoff and Indian cricketer Yuvraj Singh ended with the latter saying, "You see this bat in my hand. You know where I am gonna hit you with this bat?" Yuvraj revealed that he was fired up after the spat following which he hit six sixes in the next over.
Teri maa ki (तेरी माँ की)	Harbhajan Singh and Andrew Symonds	December 2007- January 2008	(Australia) vs (India)	Indian cricket team in Australia in 2007–08	Sledging came into the media spotlight during the 2007–08 Indian tour of Australia when Harbhajan Singh was accused of alleged racial abuse towards Andrew Symonds, who is of Jamaican ancestry and the only 'black' player in the otherwise 'all-white' Australian team. Symonds was unable to state if he had heard Harbhajan use a term in his native tongue "teri maa ki" (an offensive Hindi term) which appears to be pronounced with an "n" and accepted that it was a possibility. The allegation was not proved and a proposed three-match ban on Harbhajan was lifted.
Not God	Kevin Pietersen and Yuvraj Singh	21 December 2008	(India) vs (England)	England cricket team in India in 2008-09	During a Test match in Mohali, England cricketer Kevin Pietersen was involved in an on-field spat with Indian cricketer Yuvraj Singh. The stump mic caught the former saying to Yuvraj: "You are not God, you are a cricketer, and I'm a better one."

=== 2010-2019 ===
Incident	Players Involved	Date	Match	Part of	Description
-	Mitchell Johnson and Scott Styris	3 March 2010	(New Zealand) vs (Australia)	Australian cricket team in New Zealand in 2009–10	Australian pacer Mitchell Johnson shoulder-barged New Zealand batsman Scott Styris who hit the bowler for four runs on the next delivery. A verbal battle then occurred with Johnson deliberately brushing his head against Styris' helmet. Johnson and Styris were fined 60% and 15% of their match fees respectively.
-	S. Sreesanth and Michael Lumb	7 April 2010	Rajasthan Royals vs Kings XI Punjab	IPL 2010	After Rajasthan batsman Michael Lumb hit Kings XI pacer S. Sreesanth for a boundary on a free hit, the latter sarcastically clapped, first at the batsman, and then at the umpire (for signaling a no-ball). Kings XI captain Yuvraj Singh objected to his bowler's behaviour.
-	Kemar Roach and Jacques Kallis	29 June 2010	(Cricket West Indies) vs (South Africa)	South African cricket team in the West Indies in 2010	After delivering repeated bouncers at South African all-rounder Jacques Kallis, West Indian bowler Kemar Roach exchanged words with the former. As the situation got tense, umpires were forced to step in. Roach pleaded guilty to a Level 1 offence and was charged 50% of his match fees.
Not getting any wickets?	Mitchell Johnson and James Anderson	16 December 2010	(Australia) vs (England)	2010-11 Ashes	As England bowler James Anderson prepared for his run-up, Australian non-striker Mitchell Johnson remarked "Why are you chirping now mate, not getting any wickets?” Anderson responded within the next few seconds as he cleaned up Johnson's partner Ryan Harris and gestured to 'shush' Johnson.
Let's go outside	Peter Siddle, Ricky Ponting and Matt Prior	17 December 2010	(Australia) vs (England)	2010-11 Ashes	When England's Matt Prior was dismissed by Australian pacer Peter Siddle, the former was subject to Siddle's choicest words. Prior fired back, "Come with me...let's have it right now...let's go outside right now", pointing to the back of the stands. This irked Australia captain Ricky Ponting, who also engaged in abusive banter.
Loser	S. Sreesanth and Ricky Ponting	13 February 2011	(India) vs (Australia)	2011 Cricket World Cup	Indian pacer S. Sreesanth and Australian captain Ricky Ponting locked horns, with the bowler making an 'L' sign, signaling to Ponting that he's a 'loser'.
-	Umar Gul, Ahmed Shehzad and Balaji Rao	3 March 2011	(Pakistan) vs (Canada)	2011 Cricket World Cup	Following an aggressive exchange between Pakistani bowler Umar Gul and Canadian batsman Balaji Rao, the latter lashed out with Hindi slurs after Pakistani fielder Ahmed Shehzad appeared to provoke the batsman.
-	Jonathan Trott and Virat Kohli	17 October 2011	(India) vs (England)	England cricket team in India in 2011	England's Jonathan Trott attempted to sledge Indian batter Virat Kohli. The batter scored 112 runs and remained not out, sealing the match for his team.
-	Jade Dernbach and Gautam Gambhir	17 October 2011	(India) vs (England)	England cricket team in India in 2011	England's Jade Dernbach and Indian batter Gautam Gambhir were caught up in a 'prolonged feud'.
-	Virat Kohli and Ed Cowan	26-29 December 2011	(Australia) vs (India)	Indian cricket team in Australia in 2011-12	Australia's Ed Cowan reported that Virat Kohli employed a 'highly inappropriate sledge' in connection with Cowan's 'sick mum' which made Cowan want to 'pick up the stump and stab him'.
-	Virender Sehwag and James Pattinson	27 December 2011	(Australia) vs (India)	Indian cricket team in Australia in 2011-12	Indian batter Virender Sehwag threatened Australia's James Pattinson with the bat after the latter's shoulder blocked the batter's way while running between the wickets.
-	Kieron Pollard and John Hastings	27 December 2012	Adelaide Strikers vs Melbourne Stars	2012-13 BBL	After hitting Melbourne's John Hastings for 13 runs in 4 deliveries, Adelaide's Kieron Pollard gestured at the bowler. An irked Hastings and Pollard got into a face-to-face confrontation at the end of the over.
-	Chris Gayle and Brad Haddin	30 December 2012	Sydney Thunder vs Sydney Sixers	2012-13 BBL	After claiming Sixers batter Brad Haddin's wicket, Thunder all-rounder Chris Gayle celebrated by dancing. This did not go well with Haddin, who offered Gayle his bat on the way back to pavilion, a taunt based on Chris Gayle's batting form at the time. (Gayle was averaging 14 in the season).
Grab some more people?	Marlon Samuels, David Hussey and Shane Warne	6 January 2013	Melbourne Renegades vs Melbourne Stars	2012-13 BBL	Renegades all-rounder Marlon Samuels seized onto Stars batter David Hussey's jersey. When Samuels came out to bat during the Renegades innings, Stars captain Shane Warne went on a tirade against Samuels. Warne, with a mic on, said to Samuels: "Want to grab some more people? Fuck you mate". Further, Warne threw the ball on Samuels' chest and the Renegades player then flung his bat into the air.
-	Virat Kohli and Gautam Gambhir	11 April 2013	Royal Challengers Bangalore vs Kolkata Knight Riders	IPL 2013	A heated confrontation unfolded between Bangalore batter Virat Kohli and Kolkata skipper Gautam Gambhir after something was said on field when Kohli was dismissed. The altercation was prevented from escalating by Kolkata fielder Rajat Bhatia.
-	Mitchell Johnson and Rahul Dravid	24 May 2013	Mumbai Indians vs Rajasthan Royals	IPL 2013	When Rajasthan skipper Rahul Dravid punched Mumbai's Mitchell Johnson for a four through the off side, the bowler initiated an exchange with Dravid. The Rajasthan batter then flicked Johnson for another four next over and cupped his hand to his ear, testing Johnson's sledge.
Never played a test	Kieron Pollard and Ahmed Shehzad	16 July 2013	(Cricket West Indies) vs (Pakistan)	Pakistani cricket team in West Indies in 2013	In the second ODI between West Indies and Pakistan at Guyana, the visitors had scored just 11 runs in 6.4 overs, 5 of which came off extras. West Indian Kieron Pollard took the opportunity to mock Pakistani batter Ahmed Shehzad, saying, “I've never played a Test, but this seems like one.”
Punch him in the face	James Anderson and George Bailey	21-24 November 2013	(Australia) vs (England)	2013-14 Ashes	England's James Anderson threatened to punch Australia's Ashes debutant, George Bailey, in the face, according to Australian cricketing legend Shane Warne.
A broken fucking arm	Michael Clarke and James Anderson	24 November 2013	(Australia) vs (England)	2013-14 Ashes	During the 2013-14 Ashes, a stump microphone caught Australian captain Michael Clarke telling England's James Anderson to "get ready for a broken fucking arm" during the first Test at The Gabba. Clarke was fined 20 per cent of his match fee by the ICC for the outburst.
Be ready for the fire	Ahmed Shehzad and Tillakaratne Dilshan	30 August 2014	(Sri Lanka) vs (Pakistan)	Pakistani cricket team in Sri Lanka in 2014	Pakistani batsman Ahmed Shehzad was caught on camera telling Sri Lankan cricketer Tillakaratne Dilshan that a non-Muslim who converts to Islam goes to heaven no matter what he does in life. The Sri Lankan player's reply was not audible following which Shehzad retorted: "then be ready for the fire". Pakistan Cricket Board chief Shaharayar Khan took up the issue with his disciplinary committee.
Beg for money	Darren Bravo and Tamim Iqbal	16 September 2014	(Cricket West Indies) vs (Bangladesh)	Bangladeshi cricket team in the West Indies in 2014	West Indies' Darren Bravo taunted Bangladeshi batsman Tamim Iqbal with the question: "Why don't you pay the cricketers money?" poking fun at the Bangladesh Premier League for not clearing the salaries of several West Indian players who participated in the league. The Bangladeshi replied, "Don't come to our country and beg for money" following which the umpire intervened.
Move out of the fucking way	Brad Haddin and Ahmed Shehzad	5 October 2014	(Pakistan) vs (Australia)	Australian cricket team against Pakistan in the UAE in 2014–15	When a throw from an Australian fielder was caught by Pakistani batsman Ahmed Shehzad at Dubai, Australia's wicketkeeper Brad Haddin angrily yelled, "Hey! What are you doing here?”, followed with, "Move out of the fucking way!". The Pakistani batsman reported the incident to the square leg umpire.
A bat you're holding?	Shane Watson and Wahab Riaz	20 March 2015	(Australia) vs (Pakistan)	2015 Cricket World Cup	When Pakistan bowler Wahab Riaz was batting at the end of the first innings, Australian all-rounder Shane Watson jibed at the Pakistani player: "Is that a bat you're holding?" The Pakistani paceman settled scores with Watson in the second innings with a ferocious spell of fast bowling. During his spell, the bowler used expletives against Watson. Watson and Riaz were fined 15% and 50% of their match fees, respectively.
-	Brad Haddin, Martin Guptill and Grant Elliott	29 March 2015	(Australia) vs (New Zealand)	2015 Cricket World Cup	During the 2015 World Cup Final, Australian wicketkeeper Brad Haddin was engaged in 'repeated chatter' and 'sending-off' New Zealand batsmen Martin Guptill and Grant Elliott. In a later interview, Haddin said, "You know what? They deserved it." Haddin also said that during Australia's visit to New Zealand, the Kiwi players were so nice to the Australians that it made him 'uncomfortable'.
The Salute	Ben Stokes and Marlon Samuels	21-23 April 2015	(Cricket West Indies) vs (England)	England cricket team in the West Indies in 2015	West Indies cricketer Marlon Samuels was subject to constant sledging from England's Ben Stokes during the Windian innings, where Samuels posted a century. In response to the sledging, Samuels gave a salute-style send-off to Stokes as the latter passed the Jamaican on his way back to the pavilion after being dismissed during England's first innings.
-	Shakib Al Hasan and Wahab Riaz	2 May 2015	(Bangladesh) vs (Pakistan)	Pakistani cricket team in Bangladesh in 2015	Bangladeshi all-rounder Shakib Al Hasan verbally attacked Pakistani cricketer Wahab Riaz, leaving lip-readers surprised. A finger-pointing confrontation between the two unfolded and both players were fined 30% of their match fees for the altercation.
-	Quinton De Kock and Tamim Iqbal	22 July 2015	(Bangladesh) vs (South Africa)	South African cricket team in Bangladesh in 2015	In the over before lunch on Wednesday, South Africa's Quinton De Kock walked across the stumps to confront Bangladeshi batter Tamim Iqbal, brushing his shoulders and ribs. A verbal volley occurred between the two. De Kock was issued a 75% fine on his match fees.
You nervous?	Nathan Lyon and Mitchell Santner	27 November 2015	(Australia) vs (New Zealand)	New Zealand Cricket Team in Australia in 2015	Australia's Nathan Lyon said to New Zealand's Mitchell Santner: "Are you nervous?" to which the New Zealander honestly replied, "Ah yeah" halting the Australian sledging.
Smashed you enough	James Faulkner and Virat Kohli	17 January 2016	(Australia) vs (India)	Indian cricket team in Australia in 2015–16	After Australia's James Faulkner jibed at Indian vice-captain Virat Kohli, the Indian batsman retorted saying, "You're wasting your energy. There's no point. I've smashed you enough in my life. Just go and bowl". Kohli went on to score 117 runs, registering his 24th ODI hundred.
Fucking coward	Matthew Wade and Grant Elliot	8 February 2016	(Australia) vs (New Zealand)	Australian Cricket Team in New Zealand in 2015-16	Australia's Matthew Wade said to Kiwi Grant Elliot, "only a fucking coward sledges people when they walk off." The umpire intervened after Elliot said, "love your work."
-	Kevin O'Brien and Dawlat Zadran	19 July 2016	(Republic of Ireland) vs (Afghanistan)	Afghan cricket team in Ireland in 2016	Facing Ireland's Kevin O'Brien, Afghanistan's Dawlat Zadran moved out of his crease on the fifth ball of the 49th bowler, causing the ball to crash into the stumps. The delivery was declared as a dead ball and O'Brien expressed his displeasure with the batsman. On the very next ball, Zadran smashed the Irish bowler for a six and signaled him to check where the ball went.
-	Ishant Sharma and Sabbir Rahman	13 February 2017	(India) vs (Bangladesh)	Bangladeshi cricket team in India in 2016–17	Following a staring contest between Indian bowler Ishant Sharma and Bangladeshi batsman Sabbir Rahman in the 69th over, Sharma gestured the latter to 'watch the ball, play his cricket and keep shut.' In the 71st over, the Indian pacer got Rahman out leg before wicket and hurled expletives at the batsman during his animated send-off.
-	Kagiso Rabada and Nic Maddinson	25 November 2016	(Australia) vs (South Africa)	South African cricket team in Australia in 2016	South Africa's Kagiso Rabada hurled expletives, presumably in Afrikaans, at Australian debutant Nic Maddinson after dismissing him. South African pacer Kyle Abbott revealed that Maddinson's wicket on that delivery was planned which added to Rabada's celebratory delight.
Big one from the first ball	Matthew Wade, David Warner and Shreyas Iyer	18 February 2017	India 'A' vs (Australia)	Australian cricket team in India in 2016–17	When Indian batter Shreyas Iyer walked out to bat, Australia's Matthew Wade and David Warner attempted to sledge him. Wade chirped, "I have a feeling that he is going to go for a big one from the first ball". Iyer then hit Nathan Lyon for a six off his very first ball. Iyer described it as the 'best experience of sledging' he ever had.
Go to the toilet	Virat Kohli and Matt Renshaw	5 March 2017	(India) vs (Australia)	Australian cricket team in India in 2016–17	Indian skipper Virat Kohli told Australian batsman Matt Renshaw to 'run off and go to the toilet', a taunt constructed around Renshaw's toilet break in the preceding Test match. Renshaw also exclaimed that it was really 'loud' when Kohli began to pump up the crowd.
You called me madarchod	Ravindra Jadeja and Matthew Wade	27 March 2017	(India) vs (Australia)	Australian cricket team in India in 2016–17	Australian wicketkeeper-batsman Matthew Wade accused Indian all-rounder Ravindra Jadeja of calling him a 'madarchod' ('motherfucker'). The stump mic caught Wade demanding Jadeja translate the word to English. A clash between the two unraveled upon the dismissal of Glenn Maxwell, but the situation was defused by Ravichandran Ashwin.
-	James Anderson, Stuart Broad and Steve Smith	5 December 2017	(Australia) vs (England)	English cricket team in Australia in 2017–18	England's James Anderson revealed that sledging against Australian captain Steve Smith worked as they got him out 'cheaply'. He went on to say that the Australian appeared to be 'more interested in chatting to me and Stuart (Broad) than focussing on his job'.
-	Shubman Gill and Pakistani fielders	30 January 2018	.vs .	2018 Under-19 Cricket World Cup	India was playing Pakistan in the U-19 World Cup semi-final after defeating Bangladesh. Some Pakistani fieldsmen jibed at Indian batsman Shubman Gill, exclaiming 'yeh Bangladesh ke bowlers nahi hai (these are not Bangladeshi bowlers)' to which the Indian responded: 'hum bhi Pakistan ke batsman nahi hai (we aren't Pakistani batsmen either)'. Gill went on to score an undefeated 102 as India defeated Pakistan by 203 runs.
-	David Warner and Quinton De Kock	4 March 2018	(South Africa) vs (Australia)	Australian cricket team in South Africa in 2017-18	Words were exchanged on the field between South Africa's wicketkeeper-batsman Quinton De Kock and Australia vice-captain David Warner. The exchange followed off the field as CCTV footage captured a clash between the two players in the dressing room. The South Africa camp exclaimed that Warner's sledging was 'personal' while Warner asserted that he was standing up for his 'family', branding De Kock's sledge (directed at Warner's wife) as 'disgusting'. Warner was handed a one-year ban following the emergence of the 2018 ball-tampering scandal in the same series.
-	Kagiso Rabada and Steve Smith	9 March 2018	(South Africa) vs (Australia)	Australian cricket team in South Africa in 2017-18	A strong send-off by South Africa's Kagiso Rabada saw the pacer screaming in Australian batter Steve Smith's face and making physical contact with a shoulder bump. Former Australian cricketer Allan Border stated that the incident gave a 'bad look' to the series that was already marred by other sledging incidents.
-	Jason Hughes and David Warner	27 October 2018	Western Suburbs vs Randwick-Petersham	NSW Premier Cricket	When sledging by Suburbs' Jason Hughes towards Petersham's David Warner got personal in nature, the latter walked off the field.
Babysit/Temporary captain	Rishabh Pant and Tim Paine	13 December 2018	(Australia) vs (India)	Indian Cricket team in Australia in 2018-19	Australian captain Tim Paine sledged Indian Wicketkeeper Rishabh Pant by saying "Tell you what big MS is back in the one day squad. Should get this bloke down to Hurricanes. They need a batter. Fancy that extend your Aussie holiday, beautiful town Hobart too… get him a water front apartment”. Paine used MS Dhoni's inclusion and Pant's exclusion from the ODI squad to trigger him. He further asked Pant, “Do you babysit? I'll take the wife to the movies one night, you look after the kids?”. Pant retaliated when Paine came to bat in the Australian Innings by asking the bowlers, “Have you ever heard the term ‘Temporary Captain'? We have got a special guest here. Have you heard the word temporary captain ever? You don't need anything to get him out.” It was a direct jibe at the Aussies' skipper who had taken over captaincy just a few months earlier after the 2018 Ball-tampering saga due to the ban received by regular captain Steve Smith and vice captain David Warner.
Not that hot	Alyssa Healy and Beth Mooney	25 January 2019	Sydney Sixers vs Brisbane Heat	WBBL 2018-19	Heat wicketkeeper Beth Mooney was visibly starting to suffer from heatstroke during her match-winning knock of 65 (46). However, Mooney's Sixers counterpart Alyssa Healy, unfazed by this, taunted Mooney on the Fox Cricket player mic ("It's actually not that hot out here"). The Heat ended up winning by three wickets, as well as winning the title the following season, and finishing second on the ladder in the season after that.
Abey kaale, teri ammi aaj kahaan baitheen hain?	Sarfaraz Ahmed and Andile Phehlukwayo	25 January 2019	(Pakistan) vs (South Africa)	Pakistani cricket team in South Africa in 2018–19	During the second ODI between Pakistan and South Africa, Pakistani keeper Sarfaraz Ahmed was caught making a racist comment to South African cricketer Andile Phehlukwayo. Sarfraz was caught saying, in Urdu: "Abey kaale, teri ammi aaj kahaan baitheen hain? Kya parwa ke aaye hai aaj?, which translated: "Hey black guy, where's your mother sitting today? What [prayer] have you got her to say for you today?". The ICC took action from Ahmed as he was banned for the next four matches. Later on Ahmed apologized to the South African cricketer.
Worse batting average than I do	Nathan Lyon and Dhananjaya de Silva	3 February 2019	(Australia) vs (Sri Lanka)	Sri Lankan cricket team in Australia in 2019	With Sri Lankan batter Dhananjya de Silva out on the crease, Australian spinner Nathan Lyon picked on the opportunity to have a go at him. Lyon said, “Eh? You've got a worse batting average than what I do this summer...And you were meant to be a batter.”. To this de Silva responded, “What about you guys come to Sri Lanka?” Lyon then replied: “At least I've won a series over there". de Silva was eventually dismissed for 25, getting hit wicket off a delivery by pacer Mitchell Starc.
-	Rashid Khan and Shane Watson	23 April 2019	Chennai Super Kings vs Sunrisers Hyderabad	IPL 2019	Hyderabad bowler Rashid Khan stared down Chennai's Shane Watson after the latter hit him for four. The contest eventually turned into a verbal spat. Khan conceded 44 runs off his 4 overs with one wicket under his cap while Watson went onto score 96 runs. The Super Kings won the match by 6 wickets with one ball to spare.
-	Shaheen Afridi and Hazratullah Zazai	24 May 2019	(Pakistan) vs (Afghanistan)	2019 Cricket World Cup	Afghan batter Hazratullah Zazai took a liking to Pakistani bowler Shaheen Afridi as he clubbed the bowler for three consecutive boundaries. With Zazai missing the next delivery, Afridi verbally attacked the batter. Zazai responded by raising his right arm and flicking his wrist, suggesting the bowler go back to his crease and bowl. Zazai then hit Afridi for another four and continued to gesture the bowler. Afghanistan ended up winning the closely-contested match.
Hit him in the helmet	Matthew Wade and Jofra Archer	7 September 2019	(England) vs (Australia)	World Test Championship	Wade, who had been previously struck on the helmet by England's Jofra Archer, reinitiated sledging when Archer came out to bat: “Hit him in the helmet here, Hoffy (Josh Hazlewood)...Then ask (the umpire) if it is legbyes or runs, make sure it doesn't go to your tally.”
Would have already hit him four	Tim Paine and Mohammad Rizwan	21 November 2019	(Australia) vs (Pakistan)	World Test Championship	After Pakistani batter Mohammad Rizwan blocked a shot off Nathan Lyon's delivery, Australian wicketkeeper and captain Tim Paine jibed, "Sarfaraz would have already hit him four, Gazza", speaking to Marnus Labuschagne. Paine followed the sledging at Rizwan with: "Smells good though, smells very nice."
Keep coming, big boy	Matthew Wade and Neil Wagner	14 December 2019	(Australia) vs (New Zealand)	World Test Championship	With New Zealand's Neil Wagner peppering Australia's Matthew Wade with body-blowing bouncers, the latter commented, "Keep coming, big boy" after a bouncer struck him.
Last chance of your career	Mitchell Starc and Jeet Raval	15 December 2019	(Australia) vs (New Zealand)	World Test Championship	Australia's Mitchell Starc got chatty with Kiwi batsman Jeet Raval while bowling on the final day of the 1st Test. Starc's jibes included 'You wouldn't want to ruin it' and 'The last chance of your career'. Starc also chirped, "Christmas is pretty good when you have it off though" suggesting that Raval would be dropped from the Boxing Day Test at Melbourne.

=== 2020-current ===
Incident	Players Involved	Date	Match	Part of	Description
-	Alyssa Healy and Indian players	8 March 2020	(Australia) vs (India)	2020 ICC Women's T20 World Cup	Australia's Alyssa Healy copped a 'gobful' from the Indian team during her dismissal at the T20 World Cup Final.
-	Ben Stokes and Jermaine Blackwood	12 July 2020	(England) vs (Cricket West Indies)	West Indies cricket team in England in 2020	West Indies batter Jermaine Blackwood was copping sledging from England's Ben Stokes from the start of his second batting innings. Blackwood reported that sledges from Stokes and other English players were made with the intention of getting the Jamaican batter to play a 'rash shot'. However, Blackwood kept his cool and went onto score 95 runs, with the West Indies winning the Test by 4 wickets.
25 kilos overweight	Rishabh Pant and Matthew Wade	28 December 2020	(Australia) vs (India)	Indian cricket team in Australia in 2020-21	In response to Indian wicketkeeper Rishabh Pant's constant sledging from behind the stumps, Australian batter Matthew Wade chirped back, “You're 25 kilos overweight. Are you 20 kilos, 25 or 30 kilos overweight?”
At the Gabba	Ravichandran Ashwin and Tim Paine	11 January 2021	(Australia) vs (India)	Indian cricket team in Australia in 2020-21	After the Third Test, Paine faced criticism after his verbal duel with Ashwin as he was caught on the stump mic saying that he "can't wait to get you [Ashwin] down to the Gabba" (Australia had not lost a Test there for 32 years). Ashwin responded by saying that the return series in India would be Paine's last. Paine hit back saying, "at least my teammates like me, dickhead" and mocked Ashwin for the fact that no IPL teams wanted him in their squad. In the next over, Paine dropped a catch off Ashwin, who went on to salvage a draw from an almost certain defeat, sharing a crucial stand of 62* off 259 balls with team-mate Hanuma Vihari. India also went on to win the test at the Gabba.
Playing for cash only	Niroshan Dickwella and Jonny Bairstow	24 January 2021	(Sri Lanka) vs (England)	England cricket team in Sri Lanka in 2020-21	In the 36th over of England's first innings at Galle, Sri Lanka wicketkeeper Niroshan Dickwella sledged England batter Johnny Bairstow, remarking that he was 'playing for cash only' as he was traveling to India to play the Indian Premier League despite being dropped from the forthcoming Test series in India. Bairstow was dismissed a ball later, getting caught at slip off an inside edge.
Throw your wicket away	Joe Root and Dinesh Chandimal	25 January 2021	(Sri Lanka) vs (England)	England cricket team in Sri Lanka in 2020-21	England captain Joe Root was caught sledging Sri Lanka captain Dinesh Chandimal on stump mic, saying: "Come on Chandi, Throw Your Wicket Away". The sledge worked as Chandimal was out to Jack Leach off the very next delivery.
We all know what certain words mean	Mohammed Siraj, Ben Stokes and Virat Kohli	4 March 2021	(India) vs (England)	English cricket team in India in 2021	After Indian bowler Mohammed Siraj delivered a bouncer at the end of his over, England batter Ben Stokes said something to the bowler. Following the incident, Indian captain Virat Kohli confronted Stokes as a fiery exchange unfolded. The umpire was forced to intervene to separate the two players. According to Siraj, Stokes was using abusive language. Stokes had a different interpretation, who was heard saying, “You can say any word you want...we all know what certain words mean", suggesting he initially copped colloquial abuse.
Happy hooker boy!	Jason Holder and Dhananjaya de Silva	30 March 2021	(Cricket West Indies) vs (Sri Lanka)	Sri Lankan cricket team in the West Indies in 2020–21	A friendly banter took place during day two of the second test match between Sri Lanka and the West Indies in Antigua as Jason Holder teased Dhananjaya de Silva, who was standing at the non-striker's end. The all-rounder reminded Dhananjaya that he broke his arm the last time he toured the West Indies. “Dhananjaya…Happy hooker boy, happy hooker. Your arm was broken the last time you were here,” added the former West Indies skipper. “Stay your feets lads!” Holder concluded.
You can't read	Nathan Lyon and Marnus Labuschagne	17 April 2021	Queensland vs New South Wales	2020-21 Sheffield Shield	New South Wales spinner Nathan Lyon initiated sledging with Queensland batter Marnus Labuschagne. When Labuschagne told Lyon that he's usually calm and sits down to read the paper, the spinner responded, "You can't read, Marn." During earlier banter, Lyon was also captured saying to Labuschagne: “Broncos can flick Brodie Croft and you can play after. What do you reckon?”, suggesting the batter should play in Australia's rugby league instead.
-	Shoriful Islam and Kusal Mendis	28 May 2021	(Bangladesh) vs (Sri Lanka)	Sri Lankan cricket team in Bangladesh in 2021	Sri Lanka batsman Kusal Mendis copped a mouthful from Bangladesh bowler Shoriful Islam. The batsman then returned the favour to Islam.
Got no idea	Virat Kohli and Tom Latham	20 June 2021	(India) vs (New Zealand)	World Test Championship	During the final of the ICC World Test Championship, India's Virat Kohli was animatedly sledging New Zealand opener Tom Latham: “He got no idea Jas...you're all over him buddy...you can make him up there as well...he knows he's not getting it on the bat, boys"
Not your fucking backyard	Virat Kohli and James Anderson	15 August 2021	(England) vs (India)	Indian cricket team in England in 2021	On the fourth day of the second test, India's Virat Kohli was heard saying to English pacer Anderson, “You swearing at me again are you? This isn't your fucking backyard". Kohli kept the sledge at Anderson going, and was captured saying, "chirp chirp chirp. This is what old age makes you.”
Gonna bring your sheets today?	Virat Kohli and Ollie Robinson	16 August 2021	(England) vs (India)	Indian cricket team in England in 2021	On the fifth day of the second test, India's Virat Kohli verbally attacked England's Ollie Robinson as soon as the Englishman stepped out to crease, "Come on, big mouth", Kohli said. His sledging continued: "Gonna bring your sheets today?"
-	Lahiru Kumara, Liton Das and Mohammad Naim	24 October 2021	(Bangladesh) vs (Sri Lanka)	2021 ICC Men's T20 World Cup	A heated confrontation between Sri Lankan bowler Lahiru Kumara and Bangladeshi batsman Liton Das saw the two coming face to face. Bangladeshi non-striker Mohammad Naim was involved in the spat as well, and the exchange was halted when Sri Lankan players pulled Kumara away from Das.
-	Martin Guptill and Deepak Chahar	17 November 2021	(India) vs (New Zealand)	New Zealand cricket team in India in 2021-22	New Zealand's Martin Guptill stared down Indian bowler Deepak Chahar after hitting him for a six. The bowler delivered a long, hard stare back right after claiming Guptill's wicket.
-	Hasan Ali and Nurul Hasan	19 November 2021	(Bangladesh) vs (Pakistan)	Pakistani cricket team in Bangladesh in 2021	During the 17th over of the first Twenty20 match of the series, Pakistani pacer Hasan Ali delivered a send-off to Bangladeshi batter Nurul Hassan after claiming his wicket, gesturing the latter to leave the field. Ali was charged with a penalty of up to 50% on his match fees along with the addition of demerit points to his profile.
-	Shaheen Afridi and Afif Hossain	20 November 2021	(Bangladesh) vs (Pakistan)	Pakistani cricket team in Bangladesh in 2021	After Bangladeshi batter Afif Hossain smashed Pakistani bowler Shaheen Afridi for a six, the bowler angrily threw the ball at the batter on the very next delivery, knocking him down to the ground.
-	Jasprit Bumrah and Marco Jansen	5 January 2022	(India) vs (South Africa)	Indian cricket team in South Africa in 2021–22	The second session of the 2nd Test between India and South Africa at the Wanderers Stadium, Johannesburg witnessed a tense moment on the field when Jasprit Bumrah and Marco Jansen exchanged heated words in a mid-pitch confrontation. As the Proteas duo of Rabada and Jansen tried to bounce the Indians out, the visitors fought back with the willow and did not mind sustaining a few blows. It all began in the 54th over of India's second innings when Jansen began with a shortish delivery which struck Bumrah on the shoulder. A couple of balls later once again the left-arm seamer went short and struck Bumrah on the shoulder but the Indian pacer responded by dusting it off and showed no signs of pain. Umpire Marais Erasmus had to intervene and separate Jasprit Bumrah and Marco Jansen.
-	Kyle Jamieson and Yasir Ali	10 January 2022	(Bangladesh) vs (New Zealand)	Bangladeshi cricket team in New Zealand in 2021–22	New Zealand fast bowler Kyle Jamieson has been fined and handed a demerit point for his verbal send-off to Bangladesh batsman Yasir Ali in the second test win in Christchurch. Jamieson's competitive instincts are developing an unwanted reputation - it's his third offence in a 24-month period. The incident occurred in the 41st over of Bangladesh's first innings, when Jamieson used inappropriate language after dismissing middle order batter Yasir who top-scored with 55.
-	Ben Stokes and Jermaine Blackwood	18 March 2022	(England) vs (Cricket West Indies)	English cricket team in the West Indies in 2021–22	On day 3 of the second test match during the third ball of the 103rd over, The all-rounder Ben Stokes was bowling the 17th over of the test and looked tired, which resulted in him exchanging some heated words with batsman Blackwood after delivering the ball. It was an attempt to distract Blackwood from preventing him a century as he was on 95 runs. The exchange went on for a few seconds before Stokes returned to take the run-up. Umpire had a long chat with the England captain Joe Root and the all-rounder.
Faster than Southee	Virat Kohli and Jonny Bairstow	2-3 July 2022	(India) vs (England)	Indian cricket team in England in 2022	During the 5th test match (rescheduled test match from 2021 series), in the evening session on day 2, Virat Kohli would start chirping as he shouted some words to Bairstow: “A bit faster than Southee, eh?”. At the end of the second day's play Kohli had walked away, with his hands over Bairstow's shoulder and he was laughing away at some time. Day 3 began with Kohli began to find his voice again, and Bairstow also began to reply. Both went verbally against each other. Bairstow signalling with his gloved fingers about how Kohli was yapping away. Kohli put his finger on his mouth, and gestured him to bat. Bairstow gestured him to go back to field. At the other end, stood England's captain Ben Stokes with a gentle smile creasing his face. Later on, Bairstow eventually hit his first test match century against India and in Edgbaston Cricket Ground.
-	Asif Ali and Fareed Ahmad	7 September 2022	(Pakistan) vs (Afghanistan)	2022 Asia Cup	During the Super Four Asia Cup match between Pakistan and Afghanistan, Pakistan's Asif Ali and Afghanistan bowler Fareed Ahmed were fined 25 per cent of their match fees for their on-field altercation after Fareed Ahmad got Asif Ali out. The duo has been punished for breaching Level 1 of the ICC Code of Conduct during the clash between Pakistan and Afghanistan. The pair has been fined for an altercation which occurred after the fifth delivery of the 19th over. According to an ICC statement, Ali breached Article 2.6 of the ICC Code of Conduct for Players and Player Support Personnel, which relates to "using a gesture that is obscene, offensive or insulting during an International Match". Fareed was found to have breached Article 2.1.12, which relates to "inappropriate physical contact with a Player, Player Support Personnel, Umpire, Match Referee or any other person (including a spectator) during an International Match." The players admitted their offence and accepted the sanctions proposed by match referee Andy Pycroft. It was a tense moment in the match when the incident between the pair took place, with the contest on a knife's edge. Ali was going all guns blazing at 16 runs off eight deliveries, threatening to take the match away from Afghanistan. Ahmad then bowled a slower bouncer that deceived Ali, with Karim Janat taking the catch at short fine leg. The incident then took place when Ahmad was celebrating the wicket while Ali was walking off to the pavilion. Pakistan eventually ended up winning the contest, with Naseem Shah emerging as the unlikely hero with the bat. Needing 11 off the final over and with only one wicket in hand, Naseem hit two massive sixes off the first two deliveries against Fazhalhaq Farooqi as Pakistan won the match with four deliveries remaining. The result meant that Pakistan and Sri Lanka qualified for the final of the Asia Cup, with India and Afghanistan getting knocked out of the Super Four stage.
Come, bowl some off-spin	Virat Kohli and Travis Head	23 May 2026	Royal Challengers Bengaluru vs Sunrisers Hyderabad	2026 Indian Premier League	In an IPL match between Sunrisers Hyderabad and Royal Challengers Bengaluru, Virat Kohli told SRH's Travis Head, "Come, bowl some off-spin." He kept on telling Head, "Okay come down and bowl some deliveries" and started trash-talking him with intent to sledge Head as Kohli uttered a few words when Head changed his fielding position. When Kohli got out, Head came to bowl and took the wicket of RCB captain Rajat Patidar. Travis Head told Kohli, "Mate, you got out before I even came on to bowl." After the Sunrisers Hyderabad won the match, Kohli shook hands with all SRH players except Head, the latter of which extended his hand to shake hands, but Kohli walked away.

== See also ==
- The dozens
- Fighting words
- Smack talk
- Trash talk
- Insult comedy
