= Jon Hotten =

British journalist & writer (born 1965)

Jon Hotten (born in Aldershot, Hampshire, 7 January 1965) is an English author and journalist. He is best known for the books Muscle: A Writer's Trip Through a Sport with No Boundaries (Random House 2004) and The Years of the Locust (Random House 2009). Muscle was described by Steven Poole in The Guardian as "Superb" and by Giles Smith in The Times as "when it's not alarming, it's merely amazing". The Years of the Locust was described as "standing proud in the tradition of great boxing writing" by Richard Bath in Scotland on Sunday.

The Years of the Locust was optioned by Inflammable/Warp Films.

In June 2015 he published a novel, My Life and the Beautiful Music (Jonathan Cape).

Hotten was a contributor to Kerrang! magazine from 1987 to 1992 and currently contributes to Classic Rock Magazine. He is the author of the popular cricket blog, The Old Batsman (since November 2008) and since February 2013 a frequent contributor to The Cordon cricket blog at Cricinfo. The Old Batsman also appears in The Guardian. He is one of the co-writers, along with Sam Collins and Jarrod Kimber, of the 2015 cricket documentary Death Of A Gentleman. Hotten has presented two seasons of The Nightwatchman podcast.

He plays on the Authors XI cricket team.

== Bibliography ==
- Unlicensed: Random Notes from Boxing's Underbelly, Transworld Publishers, 1998
- Muscle: A Writer's Trip Through a Sport with No Boundaries, Vintage Publishing, 2004
- The Years of the Locust: A True Story of Murder, Money and Mayhem in the Last Age of Boxing, Vintage Publishing, 2009
- My Life and The Beautiful Music, Vintage Publishing, 2015
- The Meaning of Cricket, Vintage Publishing, 2016
- Bat, Ball and Field: The Elements of Cricket, HarperCollins, 2022
- (with Geoffrey Boycott) Being Geoffrey Boycott: A First and Second-Hand Account of 108 Caps, Fairfield Books, 2022
