= Vikram Banerjee =

English cricketer and cricket executive (born 1984)

Personal information
- Born: 20 March 1984 (age 42); Bradford, Yorkshire, England
- Height: 6 ft 0 in (1.83 m)
- Batting: Left-handed
- Bowling: Slow left-arm orthodox
- Role: Bowler

Domestic team information
- Years: Team
- 2004: Cambridge University
- 2006–2011: Gloucestershire
- 2011–2012: Buckinghamshire

Career statistics
Competition	FC	LA	T20
Matches	43	13	15
Runs scored	438	12	9
Batting average	9.73	4.00	9.00
100s/50s	0/0	0/0	0/0
Top score	35	6	5*
Balls bowled	7,911	618	330
Wickets	97	19	13
Bowling average	46.29	25.42	33.61
5 wickets in innings	2	0	0
10 wickets in match	0	0	0
Best bowling	5/74	3/47	2/30
Catches/stumpings	9/–	5/–	5/–
- Source: ESPNcricinfo, 2 August 2025

Vikram Banerjee (born 20 March 1984) is an English former cricketer and cricket executive. A slow left-arm orthodox bowler, he played first-class and limited-overs cricket primarily for Gloucestershire between 2006 and 2011, having previously represented Cambridge University. After retiring from professional cricket, Banerjee joined the England and Wales Cricket Board (ECB) in 2017, where he has held several senior roles including Head of Strategy and Director of Business Operations. He led initiatives to increase diversity and private investment in English cricket. In 2025, he was appointed managing director of The Hundred, overseeing the competition's commercial development and long-term strategy.

== Background ==
Vikram Banerjee was born on 20 March 1984 in Bradford, Yorkshire. He studied at King Edward's School, Birmingham and Downing College, Cambridge. During his teenage years, he represented Warwickshire at age-group level.

== Professional playing career ==
Banerjee made his first-class debut for Cambridge University in the annual University Match against Oxford University at Oxford in June 2004.

Banerjee made his County Championship debut for Gloucestershire in August 2006, shortly after a single appearance for Surrey in the Second XI Championship. He took four wickets in that match. In his Gloucestershire debut, he returned figures of 0 for 73 off 24 overs in an innings defeat to Somerset. During the 2006 and 2007 seasons, he also played league cricket for Dulwich and Bath when not on county duty. He was part of the ECB Emerging Players squad in the winters of 2006 and 2007, and was described as "one to watch" in SPIN Magazine in 2007. The Independent described him as having a "calm temperament and a teasing flight" as well as "accuracy and high easy action".

In March 2009, Banerjee signed a two-year contract extension with Gloucestershire, committing to the club until the end of the 2010 season. At the time, he had taken 26 first-class wickets during the 2007 season, after drawing attention at the end of 2006. Gloucestershire's chief executive described the extension as a sign of the club's confidence in his ability, and director of cricket John Bracewell noted Banerjee's role in what he called "one of the most rounded spin bowling attacks in the country". He made his List A debut for Gloucestershire against Sussex at Bristol on 19 April 2009. His T20 debut for the club came against Somerset at Taunton on 29 May 2009.

During the 2008–09 winter, Banerjee spent three weeks in South Africa with England's performance squad. In 2011, he played for Buckinghamshire in the Minor Counties Championship.

Banerjee was regarded as a consistent performer in all formats. He left Gloucestershire in September 2011, ahead of his contract's scheduled end. At the time, he had appeared in 43 first-class matches for the club. He cited a desire to pursue a career outside county cricket. The club's director of cricket, John Bracewell, acknowledged his contributions "both on and off the field," while Banerjee stated he had "thoroughly enjoyed the challenges of county cricket" and was "looking forward to challenges of a different kind."

In 2012, Banerjee appeared in Minor Counties and other domestic matches for Buckinghamshire, with recorded appearances against sides including Wales, Staffordshire, Hertfordshire, Bedfordshire, and Northumberland.

== Post-playing career ==
=== England and Wales Cricket Board ===
Banerjee joined the England and Wales Cricket Board as Head of Strategy in 2017. In 2018, he led a major research project into the barriers faced by South Asian communities in accessing and participating in cricket. His team conducted interviews with over 600 South Asian individuals across England and Wales. The findings informed the ECB's South Asian Action Plan, which included a range of initiatives to boost engagement, such as the adoption of the Rooney Rule for coaching roles, development of Urban Cricket Centres, and increased access to pitches and coaching in underserved areas.

=== The Hundred ===
In February 2024, Banerjee, as the ECB's director of operations and de facto head of The Hundred, met with representatives of Lalit Modi, the founder of the Indian Premier League, regarding a 10-year private investment proposal to acquire The Hundred, which Modi valued at $1 billion. The proposal was ultimately declined by the ECB.

In February 2025, Banerjee was appointed managing director of The Hundred. At the time, he was serving as the ECB's Director of Business Operations and had led negotiations with investors that collectively valued the competition's eight teams at over £950 million. The deals were expected to generate more than £500 million in investment, with proceeds to be distributed across the 18 first-class counties, the MCC, and the wider domestic game. Banerjee was tasked with completing these transactions, overseeing the future development of the competition, and accelerating the "global growth" of the Hundred.
