= St Ronan's School =

Coordinates: 51°2′56″N 0°32′5″W

Saint Ronan's School

Location
- Water Lane; Hawkhurst, Kent, TN18 5DJ; United Kingdom

Information
- Type: Preparatory school, Independent school
- Motto: Floreat Saint Ronan's (Let Saint Ronan's Flourish)
- Religious affiliation: Church of England
- Established: 1883; 143 years ago in Worthing, Sussex
- Founder: Rev. Philip Crick
- Chairman: Nick Beart
- Headmaster: Joe Lewis
- Gender: Mixed
- Age: 2 to 13
- Enrolment: c.350
- Colours: Dark blue and light blue
- Publication: The Ronian
- Former pupils: Old Ronian
- Affiliation: IAPS
- Website: www.saintronans.co.uk

Saint Ronan's School is an independent co-educational preparatory school for boys and girls from 2 to 13 years located in Hawkhurst in Kent, England. It currently has about 440 pupils, the majority of them day pupils, although boarding is available from Monday night through to Thursday night for all pupils from Year 4 upwards. The headmaster is Joe Lewis.

== History ==
The school was founded in 1883 and was originally located in Worthing in Sussex. During the Second World War, the school was evacuated to Bicton Park near Exmouth in Devon, but afterwards moved to its present location in Tongswood House.

The house was remodelled in the late 19th century for William Cotterill, owner c. 1868 to 1892, of a mercantile family from Birmingham. Tongswood later belonged to Charles Eugene Gunther (died 1931), head of the Liebig Extract of Meat Company which later became known as OXO, who was High Sheriff of Kent in 1926.

== Headmasters ==
- 1909–1926: Stanley Harris
- 1957–1971: Sir Richard Vassar-Smith, 3rd Baronet
- 1971–1997: Sir John Vassar-Smith, 4th Baronet

== Notable alumni ==
- Lindsay Anderson, film and theatre director
- Julian Asquith, 2nd Earl of Oxford and Asquith, colonial administrator and hereditary peer
- Christopher Battiscombe, diplomat
- Richard Rodney Bennett, composer
- Bill Benyon, Member of Parliament
- Raymond Bonham Carter, banker
- Robert Bray, soldier
- Richard Bridgeman, 7th Earl of Bradford, peer and restaurateur
- Nick Brown, Member of Parliament
- Iain Cochrane, 15th Earl of Dundonald, peer
- Sampson Collins, cricket journalist
- Frank Gardner, journalist (BBC Security Correspondent)
- Michael Grylls, Member of Parliament
- Patrick Hadley, composer
- Osbert Lancaster, cartoonist
- Laddie Lucas, Royal Air Force officer, left-handed golfer, author and Member of Parliament
- Donald Maclean (spy)
- Christopher Makins, 2nd Baron Sherfield, peer, Anglo-American diplomat, foreign policy expert, and author
- César Mange de Hauke, art dealer
- Airey Neave, British soldier, lawyer and Member of Parliament
- Francis Newall, 2nd Baron Newall, peer
- John Palmer, 4th Earl of Selborne, British peer, ecological expert, and businessman
- Thomas Ponsonby, 3rd Baron Ponsonby of Shulbrede, Chairman of the Greater London Council, Labour Chief Whip 1982-1990
- John Raven, Classical scholar and botanist
- General Sir Charles Richardson, Chief Royal Engineer and Master-General of the Ordnance
- E. Clive Rouse, archaeologist
- Charles Saumarez Smith, British cultural historian specialising in the history of art, design and architecture
- Mark Shand, travel writer, conservationist and brother to Queen Camilla
- Philip Sidney, 2nd Viscount De L'Isle, peer
- James Simpson, naval officer and explorer
- Michael Whinney, Church of England bishop
