= Archaeological Institute =

Archaeological Institute may refer to

- Royal Archaeological Institute, founded 1844
- UCL Institute of Archaeology, founded 1937, academic department at University College London (UCL), England.
