= Stump microphone =

Microphone imbedded in a cricket stump

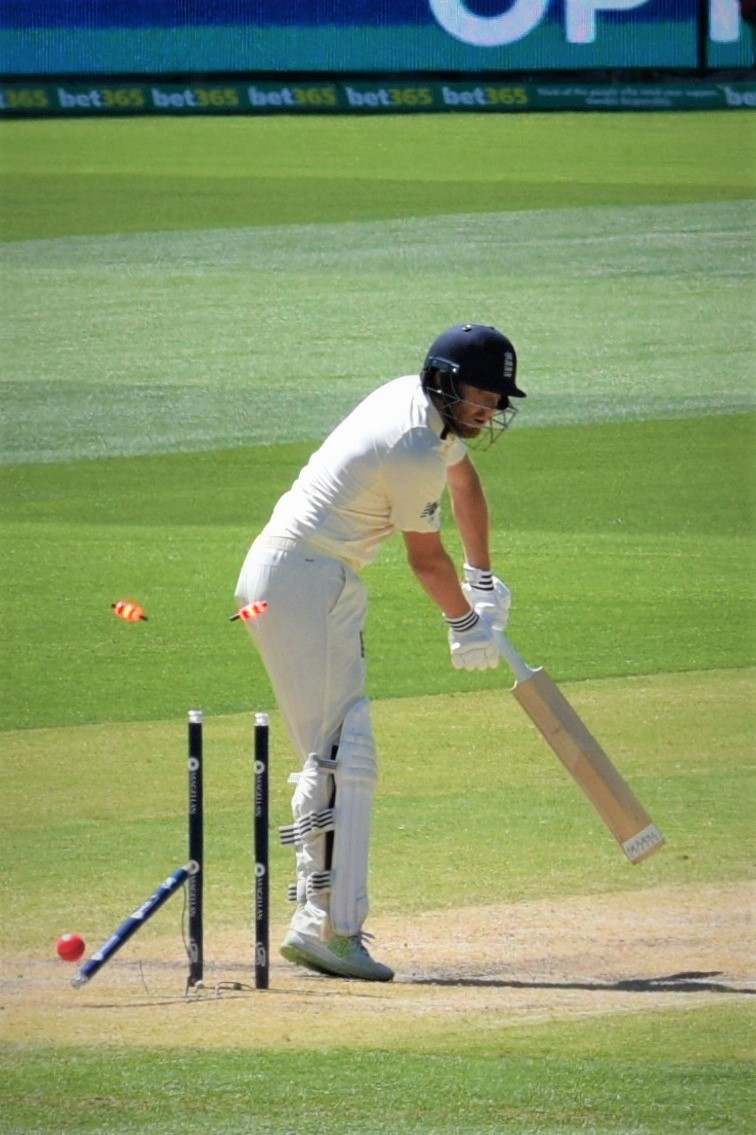
Jonny Bairstow is out bowled. Note the wire from the stump microphone attached to the displaced middle stump.

A stump microphone, informally known as a stump mic, is a microphone embedded in a cricket stump. It was originally developed by Kerry Packer for World Series Cricket in the 1970s. At first it was primarily for entertainment value: "television audiences could hear the rattle of stumps".

Later, the technology became part of the Decision Review System; the microphone detects the sound of a batter hitting the ball in order to determine whether they should be given out caught (or alternatively, not out leg before wicket). This technology is called Snickometer, with the later version being known as Real Time Snickometer (RTS). It was introduced at the 2007 World Cup for this purpose. Audio analysis of the sound produced can distinguish between the "sharp sound from bat on ball" and the "muffled sound from bat or ball on pad".

An important effect of stump microphones is that players are less likely to engage in sledging, although it is still done out of the microphone's range. England coach Trevor Bayliss has expressed disapproval over sledging being caught on the stump mics, suggesting that sledging must be censored on television. Conversely, England cricketer Moeen Ali suggests stump mics should be turned up, in order to deter players from sledging. As of 2019, International Cricket Council guidelines say the volume of the stump microphones must be turned down when the ball is dead or not in play.
