= E. Clive Rouse =

English archaeologist

Edward Clive Rouse MBE FSA FRSA (15 October 1901 – 28 July 1997) was an English archaeologist and writer on archaeology, who specialised in medieval wall paintings. He was president of the Royal Archaeological Institute from 1969 to 1972. He was known as Clive Rouse, and was usually credited as E. Clive Rouse.

== Background and early life ==
Rouse was born on 15 October 1901 in Stroud, Gloucestershire, the son of Edward Foxwell Rouse, a furniture-maker in Acton, West London, and his wife Frances Sarah Sams, whose family had been dairymen to Buckingham Palace. He was educated at St. Ronan's School, Worthing, then Gresham's School, Holt, and the St Martin's School of Art.

== Career ==
After training as an artist, Rouse worked with Ernest William Tristram, professor of design at the Royal College of Art, on the recording and conservation of medieval wall paintings. With assistants, he spent years removing or reducing wax coatings which had been misguidedly added to paintings, and conserving them using authentic materials, particularly slaked lime.

He was a lecturer and worked to educate clergy and church architects in the care of wall paintings.

He collected Chinese export porcelain, specifically armorial ware and built up the largest private collection in England. He gave away many pieces, some to the Ashmolean Museum, Oxford.

=== War service ===
Rouse served from 1939 to 1945 with the Intelligence unit of the Royal Air Force Volunteer Reserve. He was awarded the MBE for services to the Medmenham Central Interpretation Unit.

== Private life and death ==
Rouse did not marry. He died on 28 July 1997 in Gerrards Cross, Buckinghamshire.

== Honours and other positions ==
- Fellow of the Society of Antiquaries, 1937
- Member of the Order of the British Empire, 1946
- FRSA, 1968
- Liveryman of the Worshipful Company of Fishmongers, 1962
- Vice-President, Royal Archaeological Institute, 1965–1969
- President, Buckinghamshire Archaeological Society, 1969–1979
- President, Royal Archaeological Institute, 1969–1972
- Honorary DLitt, University of Sussex, 1983

== Publications ==
- Guide to Buckinghamshire (1935)
- The Old Towns of England (1936)
- Collins Guide to English Parish Churches (1958)
- Discovering Wall Paintings (1968)
- Mediaeval Wall Paintings (1991, reprinted 1996)
