= Tony Baggs =

English archaeologist and architectural historian

Anthony Paget Baggs
- Born: 17 May 1934; Norwich, England
- Died: 31 May 2006 (aged 72); Cambridge, England

Academic background
- Education: Peterhouse, Cambridge

Academic work
- Discipline: Archaeology and architectural history
- Institutions: University of London; University of Cambridge

Anthony Paget Baggs MA, FSA (17 May 1934 – 31 May 2006) was an English archaeologist and architectural historian.

== Early life and career ==
Baggs grew up in Norwich, England, where he was born on 17 May 1934. He attended Stamford School and then studied at Peterhouse, Cambridge, where he received a degree in archaeology. He served as an officer in the Royal Engineers, training at the Royal School of Military Survey, and saw active service in Malaya. After leaving the army he became director of the Bridewell Museum in Norwich. In 1963 he moved to Cambridge securing a post at the Royal Commission on the Historical Monuments for England. He was made a fellow of the Society of Antiquaries in 1965. In 1970 he became a member of the Garden History Society leading tours in Britain and abroad. He was appointment as architectural editor of the Victoria County Histories in 1971. In 1973 he was elected chairman of the Society of Architectural Historians of Great Britain. In 1975 he was made president of the Cambridge Antiquarian Society. In 1990 he was elected president of the Royal Archaeological Institute. In 1992 he formed the Cambridge Historic Buildings Group at the University of Cambridge Department of Architecture.

== Baggs Undergraduate Dissertation Prize ==
The Royal Archaeological Institute awards the biennial Baggs Undergraduate Dissertation Prize for the best dissertation on a subject concerning the archaeology or architectural history of Britain, Ireland and adjacent areas of Europe.

Past winners:

- 2006 Neil C A Wilkin - "Animal Remains from Late Neolithic and Early Bronze Age Funerary Contexts in Wiltshire, Dorset and Oxfordshire"
- 2008 Michael Marshall - "Back to Garry Iochdrach: an attempt at the reintegration and reinterpretation of the finds from an antiquarian excavation in the Western Isles"
- 2010 Joint Winners : Philippa Howarth - "Pins and Perspectives: a catalogue and discussion of the Roman hair pins from Margidunum and Ancaster" and David Carthy - "Builders or Cleaners? Debating the use of architecture by pre-modern hominids in Europe"
- 2012 Isobel Walker - "A Study of Fracture Patterns in Roman and Medieval British Populations"
- 2014 Katrien Janin - "Sex assessment on the basis of humeral and femoral heads: Perspective from post-Medieval British urban populations"
- 2016 Bethan Boulter - "Sex Estimation of a 19th century Coventry Population Using a Predetermined Odontometrical Technique"
- 2018 Fiona Louise Moffett - "The Late Medieval Parish Churches of Counties Antrim and Londonderry"
- 2020 Yannick Signer - "Agricultural Change in Early Medieval Yorkshire: A Landscape Approach"
- 2022 Maria Cunningham - "More than Concrete: Investigating the Preservation of WWII Coastal Defences on the South-East Coast of England"
- 2024 Sorcha Tisdall - "Miniature Axes in Roman Britain – Symbolism and Substitution in Ritual Dedication"
