= Sir Richard Vassar-Smith, 3rd Baronet =

Sir Richard Rathborne Vassar-Smith, 3rd Baronet (24 November 1909 – 12 August 1995) was an English educator and the fourth headmaster of St Ronan's School in Kent, England.

Sir Richard was born in 1909 in India and educated at Lancing and Pembroke College, Cambridge. He was a talented footballer and played for both the Cambridge University Varsity XI and for Corinthian Casuals. After Cambridge, Sir Richard joined Lloyds Bank where his grandfather, the first baronet, had been chairman, before being commissioned into the Royal Artillery in 1939.

Following demobilisation in 1946, Sir Richard took up a teaching post at St Ronan's School as well as purchasing a share in the business. He soon after became headmaster. Sir Richard transferred the headmastership to his son in 1971, although he continued to play an active part in school life up until his death in 1995.

Baronetage of the United Kingdom
Preceded by John George Lawley Vassar-Smith	Baronet (of Charlton Park); 1942–1995	Succeeded by John Rathborne Vassar-Smith
