= Jarrod Kimber =

Australian writer and filmmaker (born 1980)

Jarrod Kimber (born 7 January 1980) is an Australian cricket analyst, writer and film-maker. He came to prominence as the founder of the cricketwithballs blog, before working as editor of SPIN Magazine and then as a writer for Cricinfo. He has written five books on cricket and was jointly responsible for the award-winning film Death of a Gentleman.

== Early life ==
Kimber was born and raised in Melbourne and attended Epping Secondary College. He studied film at Footscray City College before moving to London in 2008.

== Writing ==
Kimber first came to prominence as the founder of the cricketwithballs blog, which according to Cricinfo: "invented a style that spawned an army of imitators who could never quite match him." He was the editor of SPIN Magazine in 2011, and went on to work for ESPNCricinfo as global writer. For ESPNcricinfo he created many online video shows, such as The Chuck Fleetwood-Smiths, On the Road, #PoliteEnquiries and Two men out (with Andy Zaltzman). For a time he co-hosted Cricket Week a show on Talksport 2.

He was nominated for Best New Writer in the National Sporting Club Book Awards 2010 for his book Ashes 2009: When Freddie Became Jesus. In relation to his 2011 book Australian Autopsy, The Guardian described him as "one of the most original cricket writers around." He also provided the cover photo for P Diddy's album Last Train to Paris.

Kimber has been also been published in Wisden, Dawn, The Ringer, The Independent, The Cauldron and many other publications worldwide.

In 2020 he started hosting his own general sports show on talkSPORT called “The Dive”.

On May 16, 2018, he announced via his Twitter feed that he was taking a sabbatical from ESPNCricinfo to work as an analyst for the St Lucia Stars. Later he would work for several other cricket teams, including being analyst for the Scotland Men's team.

== Film-making ==
Along with Sam Collins, he co-directed and co-wrote the documentary film Death of a Gentleman (2015) which had theatrical release throughout the cricket world and now appears on Netflix. The film details what the film-makers see as the short-sighted governance of cricket by the leaders of the International Cricket Council, in particular that the sport was being run for the benefit of its richest members: India, England and Australia. The film won the creators a Sports Journalists award for Best TV documentary.

== Commentating ==
Kimber was a regular guest on online cricket commentary show Test Match Sofa. He was a member of the ABC Radio Grandstand radio commentary team for the Australian 2013–14 tour of South Africa and India's tour of Australia in 2014–15. He has commentated for talkSPORT 2 for the Champions trophy, IPL and various England tours.

== Books ==
- Ashes 2009: When Freddie Became Jesus (2009)
- The Year of the Balls 2008: A Disrespective (2010)
- Australian Autopsy (2011)
- Test Cricket: The Unauthorised Biography (2016)
- The Lillee of Campbellfield (2018)
- Overthrowing Cricket's Empire (2024)
- The Art of Batting (2024)

== Podcasts ==
Kimber started a podcast on Spotify named "Double Century with Jarrod Kimber" in June 2020. Nick McCorriston has co-produced the series.

He presents unheard stories about history of cricket, and the people who have built the game. Over the years, five seasons have been released with a total of 67 episodes.
