= Gazza (TV series) =

British television documentary

Gazza is an RTS-Award winning two-part British television documentary about the English footballer Paul Gascoigne. Directed by Sampson Collins for Western Edge Pictures, Haviland Digital and Mark Stewart Productions, it was first broadcast on BBC Two in April 2022, was awarded 'Best Documentary Series' at the 2023 Royal Television Society Awards and was nominated for 'Best Sports Documentary', and shortlisted for 'Best Series' at the 2022 Grierson Documentary Awards.

== Synopsis ==
Through archive footage, the documentary tells the story of Paul Gascoigne, from the "Gazzamania" era of his fame to his struggles with alcoholism and mental health issues. There is coverage of his marriage and divorce from Sheryl Gascoigne and his admission of being a perpetrator of domestic violence. The second episode focuses on the role in his troubles that was played by tabloid newspapers The Sun, the Daily Mirror and The News of the World, and the journalists Piers Morgan and Rebekah Brooks; Gascoigne was a victim of the News International phone hacking scandal.

== Reception ==
The documentary received ratings of four stars out of five from Rebecca Nicholson of The Guardian who described the film as "classy, unobtrusive and gruesome", Anita Singh in The Daily Telegraph, who wrote that it "confounded expectations" and Michael Potts of the Radio Times who called it "Compelling… this is a documentary for everyone… it transcends sport". Reviews in the i and the Evening Standard were each one star lower, commenting on the lack of analysis provided from a production made up of archive footage, though the latter wrote of the film that it was “Exhausting, appalling, exhilarating, and the intimate footage frequently fascinating" Alison Rowat of The Herald commented of the first episode "It was a familiar, depressing story, too much so. Even those with a glancing knowledge of football would have known what was coming, and there was nothing new added". Sam Parker of GQ Magazine wrote, "Part 2 of the documentary pivots quite abruptly into something more akin to cultural history than biography, making a malevolent main character of Brooks in particular – then merely a hyper ambitious showbiz reporter – who over several years befriended Gazza and his wife Cheryl with the intention of exploiting them from the inside. It’s morally abhorrent stuff".

The series received praise from famous footballing names including Eddie Howe who called it "fascinating".
