= Classic Rock (magazine) =

British rock music magazine

- Cover of the December 2024 issue, featuring Van Halen
- Editor: Editor: Siân Llewellyn; Reviews editor: Ian Fortnam; Deputy editor: Polly Glass; Online editor: Fraser Lewry
- Categories: Music magazine
- Frequency: Monthly
- Publisher: Future
- Founded: 1998
- Country: United Kingdom
- Language: English
- Website: loudersound.com/classic-rock
- ISSN: 1464-7834

Classic Rock is a British magazine and website dedicated to rock music, owned and published by Future. It was launched in October 1998 and is based in London. The magazine publishes 13 editions a year, mainly covering rock bands from the 1960s, 1970s, 1980s and 1990s, with the likes of Led Zeppelin, AC/DC, Pink Floyd, the Rolling Stones, Queen, Black Sabbath, Aerosmith, Deep Purple, and Van Halen amongst its most prominent cover stars. As well as veteran rock artists, Classic Rock also covers modern rock bands and releases, with Alter Bridge, Rival Sons, Halestorm, Ghost, Blackberry Smoke and the Struts amongst the younger artists to have appeared on its cover in recent years.

== Publication history ==
Classic Rock was launched by Dennis Publishing in 1998. It was sold to Future in 2000, then sold again to start-up publishing company Team Rock in April 2013. Following the collapse of Team Rock in December 2016, Future bought back the magazine and its website in January 2017.

On 27 March 2018, Future re-launched Classic Rock and its sister magazines Metal Hammer and Prog under the umbrella title of Louder.

== Brand extensions ==
=== Special editions ===
Classic Rock has published numerous special editions, including magazines dedicated solely to Led Zeppelin, Iron Maiden, Guns N' Roses and others. Classic Rock's sister publication, Prog, was originally issued as a Classic Rock Presents one-shot magazine in 2009 before being launched as a separate, full-time title soon after. Other off-shoots of the publication included The Blues magazine, which ran from 2012 to 2016, while Classic Rock Presents AOR ran for 13 issues between 2010 and 2014.

=== Fan packs ===
In 2010, Classic Rock partnered with Roadrunner Records to publish Classic Rock Presents: Slash, featuring a special edition magazine dedicated to then-former Guns N' Roses guitarist Slash and packaged with a copy of his debut solo album. The partnership marked the first time a major album was released exclusively with a magazine publisher ahead of general release. Classic Rock subsequently released official 'fan packs' with Whitesnake, Alice Cooper, Motörhead, Def Leppard and Rush amongst others. The magazine released a second fan pack with Slash in 2012 for his album Apocalyptic Love.

=== Classic Rock Roll of Honour Awards ===
Between 2005 and 2016, Classic Rock hosted the Classic Rock Roll Of Honour - an annual awards ceremony celebrating the achievements of some of rock music's biggest icons. Held in London annually, winners at the Roll Of Honour Awards over the years included Lemmy Kilmister, Alice Cooper, Jimmy Page, Ozzy Osbourne, ZZ Top, Gregg Allman, Queen and more.

=== The 20 Million Club ===
In July 2020, Classic Rock launched The 20 Million Club podcast. Hosted by British broadcaster Nicky Horne with guests from the Classic Rock team, the podcast analyses the biggest-selling albums of all time, with two seasons produced as of November 2022.

== Notable contributors ==
- Geoff Barton
- Mark Blake
- Malcolm Dome
- Jon Hotten
- Mick Wall
