= Vassar-Smith baronets =

Baronetcy in the Baronetage of the United Kingdom

The Vassar-Smith Baronetcy, of Charlton Park in Charlton Kings in the County of Gloucester, is a title in the Baronetage of the United Kingdom. It was created on 10 July 1917 for the businessman Richard Vassar-Smith. He was Chairman of Lloyds Bank, of the Gloucester Wagon Company Ltd, of the Gloucester Gas Light Company and of Port Talbot steelworks and also served as Mayor of Gloucester. Born Richard Smith, he had assumed by Royal licence the additional surname of Vassar in 1904. The third and fourth Baronets were headmasters of St Ronan's School, Kent from 1957 to 1971 and 1971 to 1998 respectively.

== Vassar-Smith baronets, of Charlton Park (1917) ==
- Sir Richard Vassar Vassar-Smith, 1st Baronet (1843–1922)
- Sir John George Lawley Vassar-Smith, 2nd Baronet (1868–1942)
- Sir Richard Rathborne Vassar-Smith, 3rd Baronet (1909–1995)
- Sir John Rathborne Vassar-Smith, 4th Baronet (born 1936)

The heir apparent is the present holder's son Richard Rathborne Vassar-Smith (born 1975).
