= Death of a Gentleman =

2015 film by Sampson Collins

- Directed by: Sam Collins; Jarrod Kimber; Johnny Blank
- Written by: Sam Collins; Jon Hotten; Jarrod Kimber
- Starring: Giles Clarke; N Srinivasan; Ed Cowan; Tony Greig; Gideon Haigh
- Music by: Chris Roe, Rob Lord
- Production companies: Dartmouth Films; Two Chucks; Wellington Films (in association with)
- Release date: 8 June 2015 (Sheffield Doc/Fest)
- Running time: 99 minutes
- Country: United Kingdom
- Language: English

Death of a Gentleman is a 2015 documentary film about the takeover of the governance of cricket by ICC's 'Big Three'. It was directed by Sam Collins, Jarrod Kimber and Johnny Blank, and features interviews with takeover architects Giles Clarke and N Srinivasan (the other was Wally Edwards), alongside Ed Cowan, Tony Greig, Gideon Haigh, Michael Holding, Jonathan Agnew, Chris Gayle, Rev. Andrew Wingfield Digby, Haroon Lorgat, Lalit Modi, and Kevin Pietersen.

== Plot ==
The film details the allegation that the Cricket Australia (CA), England and Wales Cricket Board (ECB), and Board of Control for Cricket in India (BCCI) have taken over running of cricket for their own financial gain, at the expense of other Test member countries and especially the associate countries seeking Test status.

== Release ==
Death of a Gentleman premiered at the Sheffield Doc/Fest in June 2015.

=== Awards ===
The film was recognised as the Television Sports Documentary of the Year at the Sports Journalists' Awards in London in 2016. It beat films including the highly commended Catch Me If You Can (a BBC Panorama investigation into allegations of doping in athletics), and One Day in May (BT Sport's story of the Bradford City fire).
