= Sampson Collins =

English journalist, author and filmmaker

- Born: 21 September 1982 (age 44); London
- Occupations: Journalist, author and film-maker
- Notable work: Death of a Gentleman, Gazza

Sampson William Francis Collins (born 21 September 1982 in London) is an RTS-Award-winning English film-maker, journalist and author. He is best known as the director of the RTS-Award-winning, Grierson-nominated Documentary series Gazza on the treatment of the footballer Paul Gascoigne by the tabloid press, and the producer, co-director and co-writer of the award-winning documentary Death of a Gentleman, about corruption in the administration of cricket.

Death of a Gentleman was awarded Best Documentary at the Sports Journalism Awards in February 2016, winning a category that included the highly commended Catch Me If You Can (a BBC Panorama investigation into allegations of doping in athletics), and One Day in May (BT Sport's story of the Bradford City fire).

Gazza broadcast on BBC Two in April 2022, was awarded 'Best Documentary Series' at the 2023 Royal Television Society Awards and was nominated for 'Best Sports Documentary', and shortlisted for 'Best Series' at the 2022 Grierson Documentary Awards.
