= Ed Cowan =

Australian cricketer

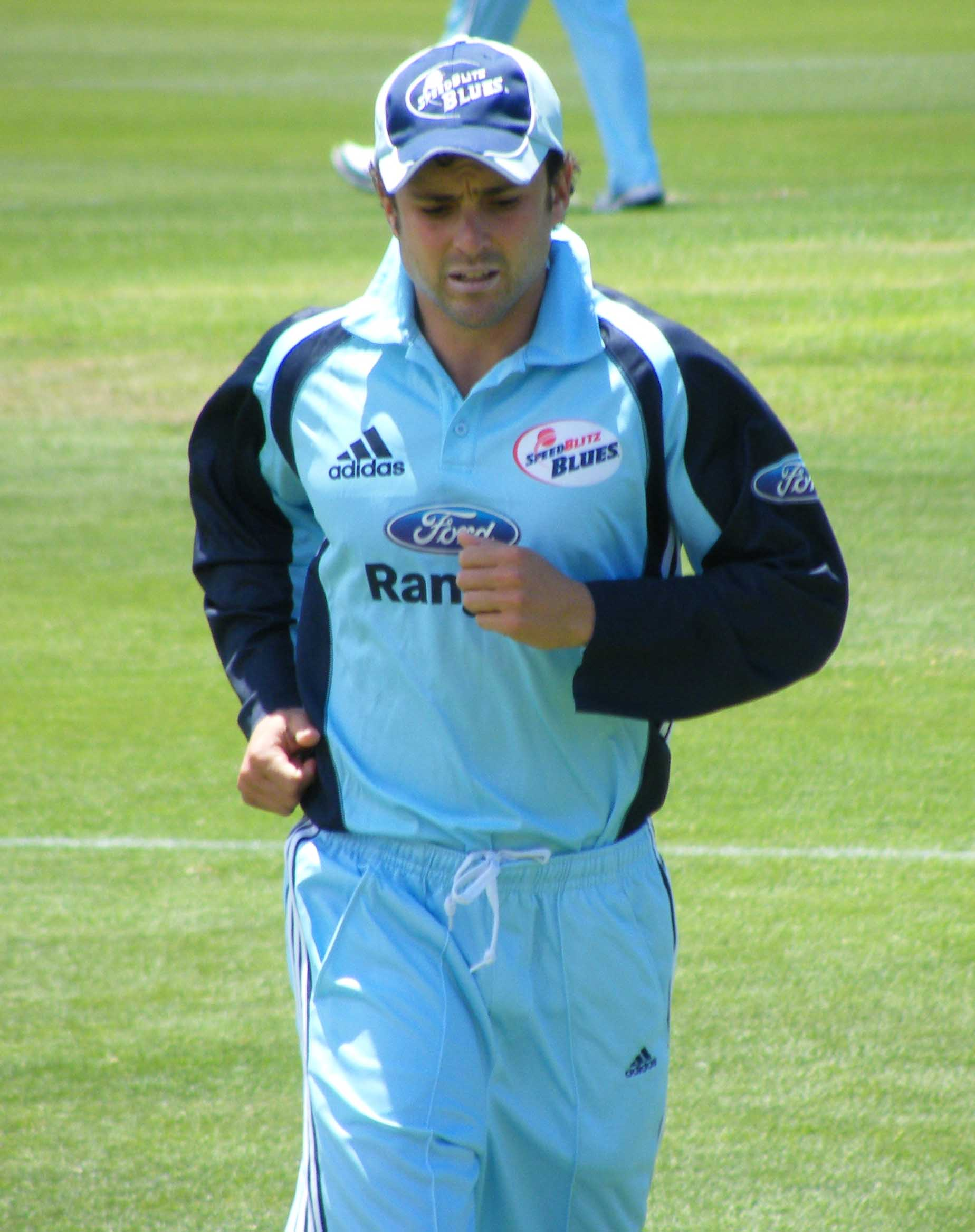
- Cowan in 2009

Personal information
- Full name: Edward James McKenzie Cowan
- Born: 16 June 1982 (age 44); Paddington, Sydney, Australia
- Nickname: Fred
- Height: 178 cm (5 ft 10 in)
- Batting: Left-handed
- Bowling: Right-arm leg break
- Role: Opening batter

International information
- National side: Australia (2011–2013)
- Test debut (cap 427): 26 December 2011 v India
- Last Test: 10 July 2013 v England

Domestic team information
- Years: Team
- 2003: Oxford UCCE
- 2004/05–2008/09: New South Wales
- 2008: Scotland
- 2009/10–2014/15: Tasmania
- 2011/12: Sydney Sixers
- 2012: Gloucestershire
- 2013: Nottinghamshire
- 2014/15: Sydney Sixers
- 2015/16–2017/18: New South Wales

Career statistics
Competition	Test	FC	LA	T20
Matches	18	143	98	16
Runs scored	1,001	10,097	2,984	229
Batting average	31.28	41.89	36.83	16.35
100s/50s	1/6	25/48	4/22	0/1
Top score	136	225	131*	70
Balls bowled	–	142	–	–
Wickets	–	0	–	–
Bowling average	–	–	–	–
5 wickets in innings	–	–	–	–
10 wickets in match	–	–	–	–
Best bowling	–	–	–	–
Catches/stumpings	24/–	94/–	30/–	2/–
- Source: Cricinfo, 7 March 2018

Edward James McKenzie Cowan (born 16 June 1982) is an Australian former cricketer, who played domestically mainly for New South Wales and Tasmania as a left handed opening batsman. In March 2018, he announced his retirement from first-class cricket.

== Domestic career ==
Cowan attended Tudor House School in Moss Vale and Cranbrook School in Bellevue Hill where he played in the school 1st XI aged only 14, and scored 218 not out, and went on to the under-17 New South Wales championships. While in Year 12 he was selected to play for the Australian under 19s side to tour Sri Lanka. He played for the University of Sydney Cricket Club, and made his debut for NSW in 2005.

In 2009, Cowan joined the Tasmanian Tigers where a successful season saw him score 225 vs South Australia in his first game at home. This was followed on by two other centuries at Bellerive Oval and a successful Ford Ranger Cup premiership. In 2011 Cowan published a book, his diary of the 2010/2011 Sheffield Shield season entitled In the Firing Line.

=== 2017–18 season ===
Cowan played every match for New South Wales in the 2017–18 JLT One-Day Cup. His best performance of the tournament came against Tasmania when he came in late in the innings to score an unbeaten 51 runs off 32 balls, including five fours and a six. At the end of the tournament he was controversially left out of New South Wales' side for the first match of the Sheffield Shield in favour of the younger Daniel Hughes despite being the top run-scorer of the entire tournament in the previous season. Australian captain Steve Smith took responsibility for the decision saying that he wanted to see more of Hughes as he felt Hughes had the potential to become an international player for Australia.

== International career ==
Cowan was selected for Australia A in June 2010 to play Sri Lanka, where he scored a century in a convincing series win.

Cowan made his Test cricket debut for Australia in the 2011 Boxing Day Test against India. His selection followed a season in which, to that point, he had averaged 64.22 in first class matches. His baggy green cap was presented by Dean Jones. Against India he became the 18th Australian opening batsman to score a half-century (68) on debut. He played in all four Tests of the series, opening the batting with David Warner. Australia won the series 4–0; over the four Tests Cowan scored 206 runs at an average of 34.33, including another half-century (74) in Perth. Cowan had less fortune in the Tour of the West Indies later that year, scoring only a half century.

His maiden Test century came on 12 November 2012, a year to the day after the death of his mentor and former teacher Peter Roebuck; Cowan dedicated the century to Roebuck's memory. Cowan was criticised after being unable to follow up with another century in the remaining tests against South Africa. Cowan finished the series with 228 runs in five innings, these included the debut test ton and a half century in the last match at the WACA.

Cowan had a bad start to the series against Sri Lanka making 4 on his home turf in the first innings. Cowan made sure he did not have another failure in the second innings by posting 56 in an opening stand worth 132 with partner David Warner.

Cowan scored 86 runs off 238 deliveries in Mohali during the Australian's tour of India. During this innings, Cowan and fellow opener David Warner achieved the highest opening partnership for Australia in India, with 139 runs. In the fourth Test, Cowan scored 38 before being bowled by Ravichandran Ashwin. Finishing the series as the second highest run scorer and one of the few bright spots for Australia at the end of a losing tour, Cowan was selected for the Ashes Tour of England that followed. He played one match in the losing series, scoring 0 and 14 in each innings in what subsequently turned out to be his final appearance for the national team.

== Personal life and education ==
Cowan is married to Australian television and radio presenter Virginia Lette. Virginia gave birth to their first child, a daughter, Romy, in August 2012.

According to the Sydney Morning Herald, Cowan "has a commerce degree, written a warts-and-all diary about life as a cricketer, grows his own vegetables, immerses himself in novels, and appreciates modern art and loves music."

When he was called from the SCG Members bar in 2005 to field as the 13th man for Australia against Pakistan for five minutes, he refused to keep the gear he was offered because Cowan did not believe he deserved it. Then, when NSW prematurely presented him with his baggy blue after he was picked as 12th man for the state's one-day team, he marched into Cricket NSW boss Dave Gilbert's office and handed it back, saying he would accept it when he was entitled to wear the cap.

He has faced difficulties by stating in an interview with The Australian, "Perception is often reality when it comes to selection," Cowan wrote. "Throughout my career, even as a junior, I have battled against a perception that a kid who went to a good school (in his case Cranbrook) and had a degree must be soft as butter."

Cowan featured in the 2015 documentary on cricket Death of a Gentleman.
