= Royal Archaeological Institute =

Learned society in London, United Kingdom

- Abbreviation: RAI
- Formation: 1844
- Type: Learned society
- Registration no.: England and Wales: 226222
- Purpose: Archaeology, architecture and landscape history in the British Isles
- Location: London, United Kingdom
- Region served: British Isles
- Patron: Charles III
- President: Nathalie Cohen
- Website: www.royalarchinst.org

The Royal Archaeological Institute (RAI) is a learned society, established in 1844, with interests in all aspects of the archaeological, architectural and landscape history of the British Isles. Membership is open to all with an interest in these areas.

== History ==
The Archaeological Institute of Great Britain and Ireland was founded in 1844 at 16 New Burlington Street, London, from where it published The Archaeological Journal and held public events. The Institute arose from a dispute in the archaeological world over the formation of the British Archaeological Association a year earlier. The Institute changed its name to the Royal Archaeological Institute in 1866. Its events could be popular: an Exhibition of Helmets and Mail held in 1880 attracted 1,200 visitors over 12 days. The Institute moved to Oxford Mansions, just North East of Oxford Circus, in the early 1880s, and then to 20 Hanover Square in 1894.

The library of the Royal Archaeological Institute was donated to the Society of Antiquaries and now forms part of the collection at Burlington House.

== Activities ==
One of the institute's principal activities is the publication of the Archaeological Journal, an annual peer-reviewed journal containing reports of archaeological and architectural survey and fieldwork on sites and monuments of all periods, and syntheses and overviews of similar work throughout the British Isles. It also hosts lectures and seminars, and both sponsors and participates in field trips to archaeological sites and landscapes. It works in cooperation with other archaeological bodies and societies. A programme of monthly lectures is held from October to May at the premises of the Society of Antiquaries of London at Burlington House.

== Presidents ==
The following have served as presidents of the institute:

- 1844–1845: Lord Albert Conyngham
- 1845–1851: Spencer Compton, 2nd Marquess of Northampton
- 1851–1861: James Talbot, 4th Baron Talbot of Malahide (first term)
- 1861–1862: George Lyttelton, 4th Baron Lyttelton
- 1862–1867: John Pratt, 3rd Marquess Camden
- 1867–1882: James Talbot, 4th Baron Talbot of Malahide (second term)
- 1882–1891: Henry Percy, Earl Percy
- 1892–1897: Harold Dillon, 17th Viscount Dillon
- 1897–1924: Sir Henry Howorth
- 1924–1926: Sir William Dawkins
- 1927–1939: Sir Charles Oman
- 1939–1942: A. Hamilton Thompson
- 1942–1945: Christopher Hawkes
- 1945–1948: Sir Alfred Clapham
- 1948–1951: Joan Evans
- 1951–1954: Sir Mortimer Wheeler
- 1954–1957: Philip Corder
- 1957–1960: W. F. Grimes
- 1960–1963: Ralegh Radford
- 1963–1966: P. K. Baillie Reynolds
- 1966–1969: D. B. Harden
- 1969–1972: E. Clive Rouse
- 1972–1975: Harold Taylor
- 1975–1978: John Charlton
- 1978–1981: Sheppard Frere
- 1981–1984: Denys Spittle
- 1984–1987: Hugh Thompson
- 1987–1990: Norman Pounds
- 1990–1993: A. P. Baggs
- 1993–1996: Andrew Saunders
- 1996–1999: Anthony Quiney
- 1999–2000: T. W. Potter
- 2000–2003: Mark Hassall
- 2003–2006: Lindsay Allason-Jones (first term)
- 2006–2009: Jonathan Coad
- 2009–2012: David Breeze
- 2012–2015: David Hinton
- 2015–2018: Timothy Champion
- 2018–2019: Blaise Vyner
- 2020–2021: Ken Smith
- 2021–2024: Allason-Jones (second term)
- 2024– : Nathalie Cohen

== See also ==
- Society of Antiquaries of London
- Royal Anthropological Institute of Great Britain and Ireland
