= Indian cricket team in Australia in 2011–12 =

	Australia	India
- Dates: 15 December 2011 – 28 February 2012
Captains	Michael Clarke (Tests); George Bailey (T20Is)	MS Dhoni (1st–3rd Tests/T20Is); Virender Sehwag (4th Test)

Test series
- Result: Australia won the 4-match series 4–0
Most runs	Michael Clarke (626)	Virat Kohli (300)
Most wickets	Ben Hilfenhaus (27)	Zaheer Khan (15)
- Player of the series: Michael Clarke (Aus)

Twenty20 International series
- Results: 2-match series drawn 1–1
Most runs	Matthew Wade (104)	Gautam Gambhir (76)
Most wickets	Daniel Christian (2); David Hussey (2); Brad Hogg (2)	Rahul Sharma (3)

The Indian cricket team toured Australia from 15 December 2011 to 28 February 2012. The tour included four Tests to contest the Border–Gavaskar Trophy (which was held by India at the start of the tour), two Twenty20s (T20Is), and eight ODIs as part of the Commonwealth Bank Tri-Series which also involved Sri Lanka.

Australian won the four Test series in a 4–0 whitewash to regain the Border–Gavaskar Trophy. Australian captain Michael Clarke was named the player of the series, having scored 626 runs at an average of 125.20. In the second Test match, Clarke, with 329 not out, scored the 25th triple century in Test match cricket. The third Test match saw David Warner bring up a century in just 69 deliveries, setting a new record for the fastest Test century by an opening batsman. In the fourth Test, Ricky Ponting and Michael Clarke compiled a fourth wicket partnership of 386 runs, the highest partnership in Tests between Australia and India, or in Tests at the Adelaide Oval. Following the Test series, The T20I series was held which was drawn 1–1. The tour concluded with the ODI tri-series with India finishing last in the ODI tri-series, with three wins, one tie and four losses from its eight ODIs and did not make it to the best of three finals.

== Background ==
By mid-2011, the Indian cricket team was enjoying unprecedented success, winning the 2011 Cricket World Cup held at home, while also being the No. 1 Test team, which they had achieved in 2009. They proved to be unbeatable in favourable home conditions, but also enjoyed unusual success away, especially beyond the subcontinent such as in South Africa in late 2010, where for the first time ever, the Indian cricket team did not lose a Test series, drawing 1-1. The team, led by wicketkeeper-batsman Mahendra Singh Dhoni, was widely praised by media and former cricketers, and Dhoni's captaincy was also considered by some experts to be one of the reasons for India's success alongside their record breaking ageing batsmen. However, this success was reversed in their tour to England in 2011. It was widely expected by Indians that India would win the Test and ODI series there. However, their weaknesses in their ageing bowling and batting were completely exposed by the Englishmen and they lost all the 4 Tests, losing their No. 1 Test status to England. Despite the debacle in England, it was widely expected by Indians that India would retain the Border–Gavaskar Trophy after the series in Australia. Though the team's previous two tours Down Under were middling, achieving only one Test victory in each, the Australian cricket team was notably weaker than in the 2000s. The nucleus of the Indian side selected for the tour had a number of experienced players who had a good record in Australia. India had most recently won a five-match ODI home series against England 5–0 in October and a three-Test home series against the very weak West Indies 2–0 in November, improving expectations.

The Australian team was undergoing a period of transition, with many of their successful players like Shane Warne, Adam Gilchrist, Matthew Hayden and Glenn McGrath having retired after the 2006/7 Ashes and former captain and ageing batting mainstay Ricky Ponting woefully out-of-form. The team was now captained by Michael Clarke and had many inexperienced players. Australia's recent record was not inspiring, meekly losing the home 2010/11 Ashes series, failing to reach the semifinals of the Cricket World Cup for the first time since 1992, and drawing two recent Test series in South Africa away and home against New Zealand at home. Their coach Tim Nielsen had been sacked and replaced with former South African coach Mickey Arthur. Not many cricket experts and media, even in Australia, were expecting an Australian resurgence against a very formidable India.

This was ageing batting maestro Sachin Tendulkar's fifth series in Australia, having been a member of the Indian side in its previous tours Down Under in 1991, 1999, 2003 and 2007. At the beginning of the tour, Tendulkar had scored 99 centuries in international cricket; the tour gave him the long overdue and agonisingly absent opportunity to become the first player in the history of the sport to reach score his hundredth international century, if across two widely differing formats.

India made two changes to its bowling attack from the third Test of the West Indies series, with pacemen Zaheer Khan and Umesh Yadav replacing paceman Varun Aaron and spinner Pragyan Ojha, and fielding an unchanged batting lineup. Harbhajan Singh, who had previously taken the wicket of Ponting ten times in his career, was not selected.

In the Limited Overs squad, Praveen Kumar returned to the squad after recovering from a fractured rib. Sachin Tendulkar was also in the squad, although he had not played an ODI since the final of the World Cup in April 2011.

Australian T20I captain Cameron White was dropped from the T20I team due to poor form at domestic level; he was replaced in the team, and replaced as captain, by George Bailey, who made his international debut. Australian spinner Brad Hogg came out of retirement at the age of 41 to play the T20Is.

Tests		ODIs		T20Is	
Australia	India	Australia	India	Australia	India
Michael Clarke (c); Brad Haddin (vc) & (wk); Dan Christian; Ed Cowan; Ben Hilfenhaus; Michael Hussey; Nathan Lyon; Shaun Marsh; James Pattinson*; Ricky Ponting; Peter Siddle; Mitchell Starc; David Warner; Ryan Harris; Mitchell Starc*	Mahendra Singh Dhoni (c) & (wk); Virender Sehwag (vc); Ravichandran Ashwin; Rahul Dravid; Gautam Gambhir; Zaheer Khan; Virat Kohli; Vinay Kumar***; VVS Laxman; Abhimanyu Mithun**; Pragyan Ojha; Ajinkya Rahane; Wriddhiman Saha (wk); Ishant Sharma; Rohit Sharma; Sachin Tendulkar; Umesh Yadav	Michael Clarke (c); Shane Watson (vc); David Warner (vc) (First 5 ODI's); Dan Christian; David Hussey; Michael Hussey; Matthew Wade (wk); Ben Hilfenhaus****; Ryan Harris; Mitchell Starc; Xavier Doherty; Clint McKay; Mitchell Marsh; Peter Forrest; Brett Lee; James Pattinson	Mahendra Singh Dhoni (c) & (wk); Virender Sehwag (vc); Gautam Gambhir; Zaheer Khan; Praveen Kumar; Irfan Pathan; Rohit Sharma; Manoj Tiwary; Umesh Yadav; Ravichandran Ashwin; Ravindra Jadeja; Virat Kohli; Parthiv Patel (wk); Suresh Raina; Rahul Sharma; Sachin Tendulkar; Vinay Kumar	George Bailey (c); David Warner (vc); Travis Birt; Daniel Christian; Xavier Doherty; James Faulkner; Aaron Finch; Brad Hogg; David Hussey; Brett Lee; Clint McKay; Mitchell Marsh; Shaun Marsh; Matthew Wade (wk)	Mahendra Singh Dhoni (c) & (wk); Virender Sehwag (vc); Ravichandran Ashwin; Gautam Gambhir; Ravindra Jadeja; Zaheer Khan; Virat Kohli; Praveen Kumar; Parthiv Patel (wk); Irfan Pathan; Suresh Raina; Rahul Sharma; Rohit Sharma; Sachin Tendulkar; Manoj Tiwary; Vinay Kumar; Umesh Yadav

- * James Pattinson missed the last two tests and was replaced by fellow quick Mitchell Starc ahead of the third test in Perth.
- ** Replaced Varun Aaron who was picked for the tour.
- *** Replaced Praveen Kumar who was picked for the tour.
- **** Replaced Brett Lee who was picked for the tour.

== Tour matches ==
=== Chairman's XI vs Indians ===
15–16 December 2011
Scorecard

Cricket Australia Chairman's XI	v	Indians
6/398d (86 overs); Tom Cooper 182* (194); Umesh Yadav 3/39 (15 overs)		6/320 (83.1 overs); Sachin Tendulkar 92 (132); Cameron Boyce 2/72 (18 overs)

Match drawn
Manuka Oval, Canberra
Umpires: Mick Martell and John Ward (Both Aus)

- Indians won the toss and elected to field
- Match delayed by rain on Day 2
- Tendulkar and Laxman retired out on 92 and 57 respectively

=== Chairman's XI vs Indians ===
19–21 December 2011
Scorecard

Indians	v	Cricket Australia Chairman's XI
269 (79.1 overs); Virat Kohli 132 (171); Jon Holland 6/70 (17 overs)		7/215d (59 overs); Ed Cowan 109 (154); Ravichandran Ashwin 3/52 (14 overs)
2/90d (30 overs); Gautam Gambhir 42* (98); Peter George 1/12 (7 overs)		0/100 (30 overs); Usman Khawaja 56* (84)

Match drawn
Manuka Oval, Canberra
Umpires: Mick Martell and John Ward (Both Aus)

- Indians won the toss and elected to bat
- Match delayed by rain and bad light on Day 1

== Test series (Border–Gavaskar Trophy) ==
=== Trophy background ===
Entering the series, India held the Border–Gavaskar Trophy after winning the previous two Test series between the countries, both of which were held in India: 2–0 from four Tests in 2008–09, and 2–0 from two Tests in 2010–11.

=== Decision Review System (DRS) ===
The series was played without the players having access to the decision review system (DRS). At the time, the DRS could be used in any Test series at the agreement of both participating cricket boards, but the Board of Control for Cricket in India opposed its use in this series. Umpires could still initiate reviews to the third umpire for run out, stumping and no ball decisions.

=== 1st Test ===
26–29 December 2011
Scorecard

Australia	v	India
333 (110 overs); Ed Cowan 68 (177); Zaheer Khan 4/77 (31 Overs)		282 (94.1 overs); Sachin Tendulkar 73 (98); Ben Hilfenhaus 5/75 (26 Overs)
240 (76.3 overs); Michael Hussey 89 (134); Umesh Yadav 4/49 (15 Overs)		169 (47.5 overs); Sachin Tendulkar 32 (46); James Pattinson 4/53 (15 Overs)

Australia won by 122 runs
Melbourne Cricket Ground, Melbourne
Umpires: Marais Erasmus (SA) and Ian Gould (Eng)
Player of the match: James Pattinson (Aus)

- Australia won the toss and elected to bat.
- Match delayed by rain on Day 1, one over lost
- Test debut: Ed Cowan (Aus)

Match Report:

Day 1

Australia won the toss and batted first. Play was interrupted for around forty minutes after the lunch break, but only one over was lost after the day's play was extended. Ed Cowan scored 68 runs on debut; Ricky Ponting scored 62. Australia suffered a middle order collapse, falling at one stage from 3/205 to 6/214, but Australia steadied to reach 6/277 at the end of Day 1. Television replays and technology cast doubt on the umpires' decisions to dismiss Cowan and Michael Hussey caught behind on the first day. A total of over 70,000 people attended the Melbourne Cricket Ground for the first day of the Boxing Day Test.

Day 2

Australia reached 333 before being bowled out before lunch. India started well in its first innings, with three of its senior batsmen — Virender Sehwag (67), Rahul Dravid (68) and Sachin Tendulkar (73) — making half-centuries before Peter Siddle claimed Tendulkar's wicket in the last over of the day's play, with India 214/3 at stumps.

Day 3

India then suffered a batting collapse on the third morning, losing 7/68 in the morning session to be bowled out for 282. Ben Hilfenhaus collected the first five-wicket haul of his Test career (5/75). Australia took a 51-run lead into the second innings, but suffered a top order collapse, falling to 4/27. Umesh Yadav took three of the early wickets, finishing the match with seven. Ricky Ponting (60) and Michael Hussey (89), both under pressure to maintain their positions in the team, salvaged the innings after the collapse, combining for a partnership of 115, but three more quick wickets in the afternoon saw Australia 8/179 at stumps. A strong contribution from the tail, most notably James Pattinson (37 not out).

Day 4

Australia added a further 61 runs, to be dismissed for 240, a lead of 291 runs. India fell 123 runs short of the target, dismissed inside fifty overs on the fourth day for 169. Tendulkar was the top scorer with 32, and India was unable to compile any significant partnerships. All of the Australian fast bowlers took wickets, with four to Pattinson, three to Peter Siddle and two to Hilfenhaus.

James Pattinson was named player of the match, with bowling figures of 2/55 and 4/53, and useful batting contributions of 18* and 37*. It was Pattinson's second player of the match award in only the third Test match of his career.

=== 2nd Test ===
3–6 January 2012
Scorecard

India	v	Australia
191 (59.3 overs); Mahendra Singh Dhoni 57* (77); James Pattinson 4/43 (14 overs)		4/659d (163 overs); Michael Clarke 329* (468); Zaheer Khan 3/122 (31 overs)
400 (110.5 overs); Gautam Gambhir 83 (142); Ben Hilfenhaus 5/106 (32.5 overs)

Australia won by an innings and 68 runs
Sydney Cricket Ground, Sydney
Umpires: Marais Erasmus (SA) and Ian Gould (Eng)
Player of the match: Michael Clarke (Aus)

- India won the toss and elected to bat.

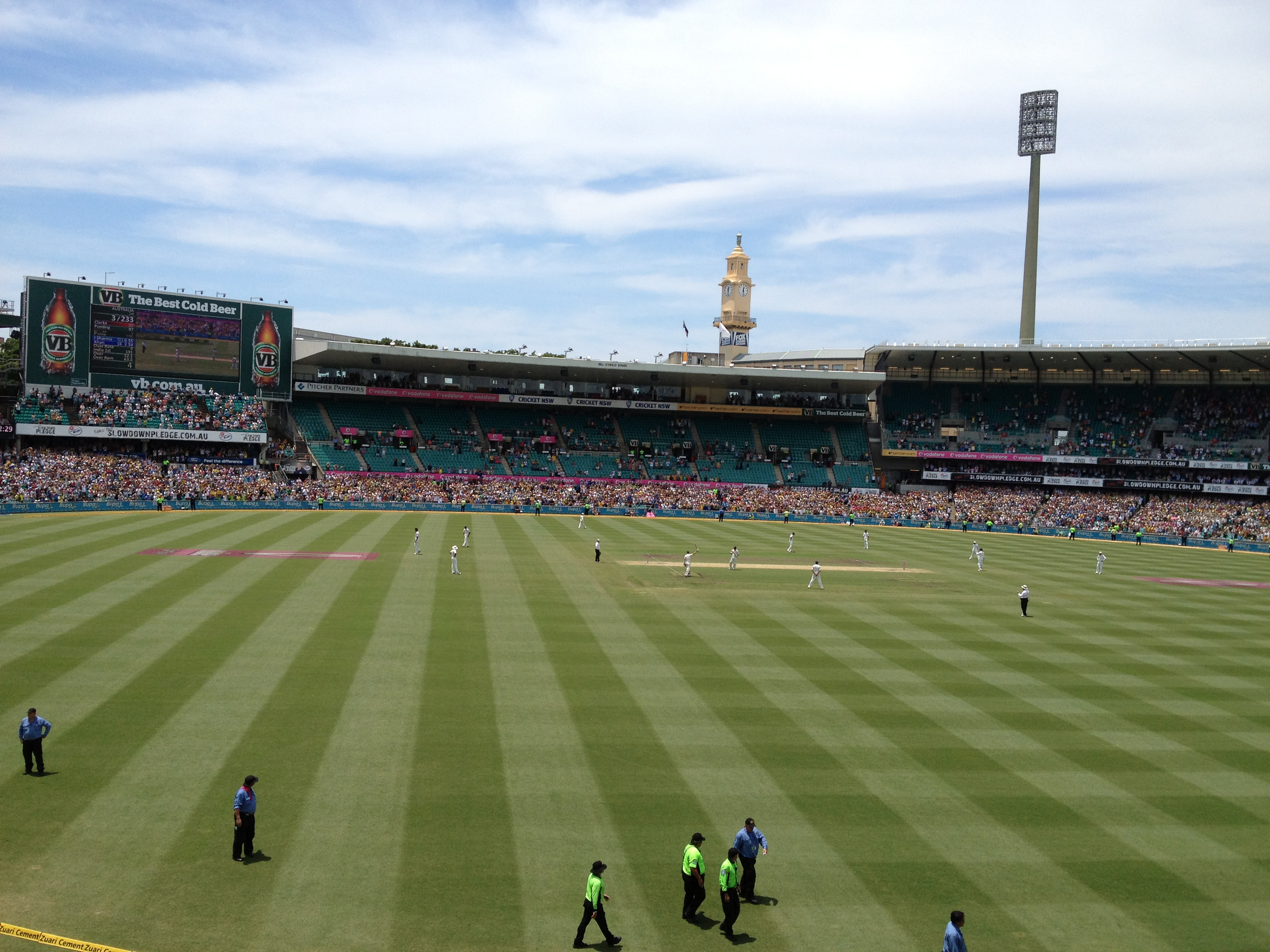
Man of the match Michael Clarke celebrates his 100th run, later to become the first person to score a triple century at the SCG

Match Report:

Day 1

Both teams were unchanged. India won the toss and chose to bat. The Australian bowlers dominated the Indian batsman, who lost wickets regularly through the day. The half-century partnership between Ravichandran Ashwin (20) and top-scorer MS Dhoni (57*) for the seventh wicket provided the only resistance, and India was dismissed for 191 after tea. James Pattinson (4/43) was the top bowler for Australia, taking the wickets of four of India's top five batsmen.

In reply, the Australian top order collapsed to 3/37, with Zaheer Khan taking all three wickets and at one point on a hat-trick. Michael Clarke and Ricky Ponting then steadied the Australian innings, adding 79 runs without loss to take Australia to 3/116 at stumps.

Day 2

Australian batting dominated the second day. Clarke and Ponting (134) batted together until after drinks in the afternoon session, adding a total of 288 runs for the fourth wicket before Ponting was caught at point. Michael Hussey and Clarke then batted for the rest of the day, guiding Australia to 4/482 at stumps. Altogether, Australia scored 366 runs for the loss of only one wicket during the day's play, at a healthy run rate of 4.07 runs per over. Clarke reached his first Test double century after the tea break, and finished the day 251*.

Day 3

Clarke (329*) and Hussey (150*) continued to bat through the morning, and Clarke reached the twenty-fifth Test triple century after the lunch break. Clarke eventually declared midway through the afternoon session at 4/659, for a lead of 468 runs. The unbroken partnership between Clarke and Hussey was worth 334 runs. The innings of Clarke is the highest score by an Australian Test skipper on home soil, surpassing the Donald Bradman's 270 at Melbourne in 1937.

After losing Virender Sehwag (4) early, Gautam Gambhir and Rahul Dravid (29) added 82 runs for the second wicket, before Dravid was dismissed late in the day. India finished 2/114 at stumps, with Ben Hilfenhaus taking both third day wickets for Australia.

Day 4

India added 129 runs for the loss of only Gambhir (83) in the morning session to go to lunch at 3/243. From the loss of Sachin Tendulkar (80), India collapsed from 3/271 to 7/286. India added 114 runs for the final three wickets, before being dismissed for 400 midway through the evening session, 68 runs short of making Australia bat again. Hilfenhaus (5/106) was the best of the Australian bowlers.

Michael Clarke was named man of the match for his career best of 329*. Clarke's innings is the highest score and the first Test triple century at the SCG, and third-highest score by an Australian captain in Test cricket, behind Mark Taylor (334*) and Sir Donald Bradman (334). Clarke also took Tendulkar's wicket in the second innings.

Ricky Ponting's 134 broke a slump of 31 Test innings without a century.

=== 3rd Test ===
13–15 January 2012
Scorecard

India	v	Australia
161 (60.2 overs); Virat Kohli 44 (81); Ben Hilfenhaus 4/43 (18 overs)		369 (76.2 overs); David Warner 180 (159); Umesh Yadav 5/93 (17 overs)
171 (63.2 overs); Virat Kohli 75 (136); Ben Hilfenhaus 4/54 (18 overs)

Australia won by an innings and 37 runs
WACA Ground, Perth
Umpires: Aleem Dar (Pak) and Kumar Dharmasena (SL)
Player of the match: David Warner (Aus)

- Australia won the toss and elected to bowl.
- Test debut: Vinay Kumar (Ind)

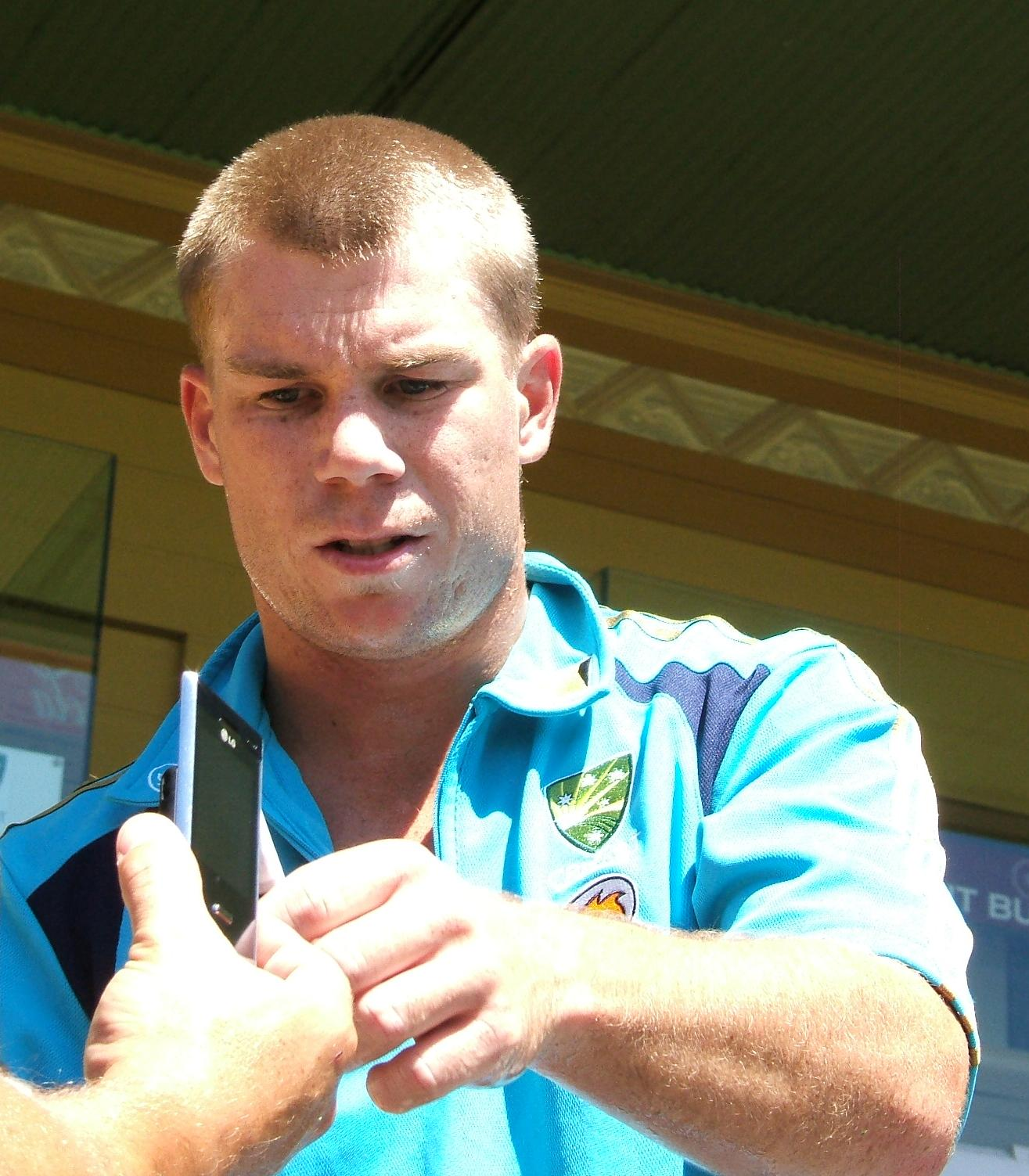
David Warner smashed his hundred from just 69 balls

On the eve of the test match, an Indian television network caught WACA ground staff drinking on the uncovered match pitch. Pitch curator Cameron Sutherland responded by claiming it was a traditional event for the ground staff which had occurred since Sutherland took over the job of curator.

Both teams opted to play four fast bowlers, with Mitchell Starc and Ryan Harris replacing spinner Nathan Lyon and injured paceman James Pattinson for Australia, and debutante Vinay Kumar replacing spinner Ravichandran Ashwin for India.

Match Report:

Day 1

Australia won the toss and chose to bowl on a greenish pitch. Australia bowled well, and was able to take wickets regularly to dismiss India for 161 shortly after the tea break. VVS Laxman (31) and top scorer Virat Kohli (44) compiled the only half-century partnership (68 runs for the fifth wicket), and India lost its final six wickets for only thirty runs. The Australian bowlers shared the wickets, with Ben Hilfenhaus (4/43) recording the best figures, and Peter Siddle taking three wickets. Australia limited India's run rate to only 2.66 runs per over.

In reply, Australia raced to 0/149 in just 23 overs before the close of play, at a run rate of 6.47 runs per over, with opener David Warner scoring a century from only 69 deliveries to finish on 104* at stumps; it set a new record for the fastest Test century by an opening batsman, breaking the previous record set by Chris Gayle (70 balls) at the same venue in 2009–10. The century matched Shivnarine Chanderpaul to become the equal-fourth fastest Test century scored at that time.

Day 2

Warner (180) and Cowan (74) batted for the first hour of the day's play, and reached 214 without loss, before Cowan was bowled shortly before drinks in the morning session. Australia then suffered a batting collapse, losing all ten wickets for only 155 runs, to be dismissed for 369 at tea, with a lead of 208. Umesh Yadav took five wickets for India, while tail-ender Peter Siddle (30) was the only Australian batsman other than the two openers to manage more than twenty runs.

In its second innings, India fell to 4/51 before finishing the day at 4/88, a deficit of 120 runs.

Day 3

India reached 6/165 at lunch after an even morning session, but lost its last four wickets for no score to be dismissed shortly after the break for 171, 37 runs short of making Australia bat a second time. After lunch, Hilfenhaus took three wickets in an over and Siddle finished the match by dismissing Kohli. Hilfenhaus and Siddle took four and three wickets respectively. Kohli (75) top-scored for the second time in the match for India.

The innings victory gave Australia a 3–0 lead in the series, ensuring that Australia would win the series and regain the Border–Gavaskar Trophy for the first time in 4 years.

David Warner was named Man of the Match. MS Dhoni (the Captain of India) was suspended for one match after he was found guilty of a slow over-rate for the second time in twelve months. He was fined 40% of his match fee and the rest of the Indian team was fined 20%.

=== 4th Test ===
24–28 January 2012
Scorecard

Australia	v	India
7/604d (157 overs); Ricky Ponting 221 (404); Ravichandran Ashwin 3/194 (53 overs)		272 (95.1 overs); Virat Kohli 116 (213); Peter Siddle 5/49 (15 overs)
5/167d (46 overs); Ricky Ponting 60* (96); Ravichandran Ashwin 2/73 (20 overs)		201 (67.4 overs); Virender Sehwag 62 (53); Nathan Lyon 4/63 (21.4 overs)

Australia won by 298 runs
Adelaide Oval, Adelaide
Umpires: Aleem Dar (Pak) and Kumar Dharmasena (SL)
Player of the match: Peter Siddle (Aus)

- Australia won the toss and elected to bat.
- Rahul Dravid & VVS Laxman (Ind) played their last international match.

Match Report:

Day 1

Australia made one change to their lineup, with spinner Nathan Lyon for paceman Mitchell Starc. India made two changes with Ravichandran Ashwin back replacing Vinay Kumar. The Indian captain MS Dhoni was replaced by Wriddhiman Saha and Virender Sehwag replaced him as captain.

Australia won the toss and chose to bat on a good pitch for batting. India reduced Australia to 3/84, with spinner Ravichandran Ashwin coming into the attack early and taking two wickets. Michael Clarke and Ricky Ponting then combined to put on an unbeaten partnership of 251 before the end of the day, with both men making centuries. In the process, Ponting passed 13,000 Test runs, becoming the third batsman, and the first Australian batsman, to reach the milestone. Australia finished the day at 335/3.

Day 2

Ponting (221) and Clarke (210) put on a further 135 runs on Day 2, with both men making double centuries, before the partnership was broken. The 386-run partnership is the highest in Tests between Australia and India, the highest ever at the Adelaide Oval, and the highest Australian Test partnership to not feature Donald Bradman. Australia continued to bat until early in the evening session, Michael Clarke declaring at 7/604. In reply, India lost two early wickets, to finish on 61/2 at stumps.

Day 3

Australia reduced India to 5/122 at lunch on Day 3, with Peter Siddle taking three of the Indian top order wickets. A 114-run partnership for the sixth wicket between Virat Kohli and Wriddhiman Saha (35) took India to 5/225, before Saha was dismissed at tea. The final four wickets fell for 47 runs, and India was dismissed for 272, a deficit of 332 runs. Peter Siddle finished with 5/49, supported by Ben Hilfenhaus' 3/62, while Virat Kohli (116) scored his maiden Test century, and top-scored for the third consecutive innings. Australia elected not to enforce the follow-on, and lost early wickets to finish 50/3 at stumps.

Day 4

Australia batted until shortly after lunch on Day 4, declaring at 5/167, a lead of 499 runs. Ponting (60*) top-scored for the second time in the match; Ashwin's two wickets were the most by an Indian bowler. India finished the day at 6/166, with Virender Sehwag scoring a quick 62 from 53 deliveries, Nathan Lyon taking three wickets and Ryan Harris taking two.

Day 5

Australia took the remaining four wickets inside an hour of play, dismissing India for 201, for a 298-run victory. Nathan Lyon finished with four wickets, and Ryan Harris with three.

Peter Siddle (5/49 & 1/47) won the Man of the Match award, after being the main wicket taker in the top order of India's first innings.

=== Player statistics ===
Test Statistics
Player	Tests	Runs	Batting average	Wickets	Bowling average
Michael Clarke (Australia) (c)	4	626	125.20	1	54.00
Mahendra Singh Dhoni (India) (c/wk)	3	102	20.40		
Brad Haddin (Australia) (vc/wk)	4	86	28.66		
Virender Sehwag (India) (vc)	4	198	24.75	1	157.00
Ravichandran Ashwin (India)	3	163	32.60	9	62.77
Ed Cowan (Australia)	4	206	34.33		
Rahul Dravid (India)	4	194	24.25		
Gautam Gambhir (India)	4	181	22.62		
Ryan Harris (Australia)	2	44	44.00	6	29.83
Ben Hilfenhaus (Australia)	4	39	13.00	27	17.22
Michael Hussey (Australia)	4	293	58.60	0	
Zaheer Khan (India)	4	69	8.62	15	31.80
Virat Kohli (India)	4	300	37.50	0	
VVS Laxman (India)	4	155	19.37		
Nathan Lyon (Australia)	3	6	3.00	7	41.57
Shaun Marsh (Australia)	4	17	2.83		
James Pattinson (Australia)	2	55		11	23.36
Ricky Ponting (Australia)	4	544	108.80		
Wriddhiman Saha (India) (wk)	1	38	19.00		
Ishant Sharma (India)	4	49	7.00	5	90.20
Peter Siddle (Australia)	4	77	19.25	23	18.65
Mitchell Starc (Australia)	1	15		4	17.50
Sachin Tendulkar (India)	4	287	35.87		
R Vinay Kumar (India)	1	11	5.50	1	73.00
David Warner (Australia)	4	266	44.33	0	
Umesh Yadav (India)	4	28	9.33	13	39.35

== Twenty20 series ==
=== 1st T20I ===
1 February 2012
Scorecard

Australia; 4/171 (20.0 overs)	v	India; 6/140 (20.0 overs)
Matthew Wade 72 (43); Suresh Raina 1/22 (3 overs)		MS Dhoni 48* (43); David Hussey 2/4 (2 overs)

Australia won by 31 runs
Stadium Australia, Sydney
Attendance: 59,659
Umpires: Bruce Oxenford (Aus) and Paul Reiffel (Aus)
Player of the match: Matthew Wade (Aus)

- India won the toss and chose to field.
- Match delayed by rain; but no time lost.
- T20I debuts: George Bailey (as captain), Xavier Doherty and James Faulkner (Aus); Rahul Sharma (Ind)

Match Report: Matthew Wade's 72 off 43 deliveries propelled Australia to a score of 171.

=== 2nd T20I ===
3 February 2012
Scorecard

Australia; 131 (19.4 overs)	v	India; 2/135 (19.4 overs)
Aaron Finch 36 (23); Praveen Kumar 2/21 (3 overs)		Gautam Gambhir 56* (60); Brad Hogg 1/19 (3 overs)

India won by 8 wickets
Melbourne Cricket Ground, Melbourne
Attendance: 62,275
Umpires: Simon Fry (Aus) and Bruce Oxenford (Aus)
Player of the match: Ravindra Jadeja (Ind)

- Australia won the toss and elected to bat

Match Report:

As a result of winning this match, India ended a 17 away international win drought.

== Attendances ==
=== Test series ===
Match	Day	Attendance
Melbourne	1	70,917
Melbourne	2	52,858
Melbourne	3	40,556
Melbourne	4	25,865
Match Total		189,347
Sydney	1	35,510
Sydney	2	30,077
Sydney	3	31,644
Sydney	4	17,881
Match Total		115,112
Perth	1	17,956
Perth	2	17,194
Perth	3	14,352
Match Total		49,502
Adelaide	1	21,480
Adelaide	2	19,671
Adelaide	3	35,081
Adelaide	4	17,408
Match Total		93,640
Total	15	447,601
Average		29,840

=== T20I series ===
- 1st T20I Attendance at ANZ, Sydney: 59,659
- 2nd T20I Attendance at MCG, Melbourne: 62,275
- Total Attendance: 121,934
- Average Attendance: 60,967

== Commonwealth Bank Series ==
The 2011–12 Commonwealth Bank Series was a triangular One Day International cricket tournament, played by Australia, India and Sri Lanka. The tournament was held in Australia from 5 February 2012 to 8 March 2012, and consisted of a round robin stage, in which each nation played each of the others four times. The top two teams at the end of the round robin stage then participated in a best-of-three finals series.

In a close round robin, Sri Lanka and Australia qualified for the finals series, each with 19 points in the group stage; India finished last with 15 points, and did not qualify for the finals. Australia went on to beat Sri Lanka 2–1 in the finals.

Group Stage
Pos	Team	P	W	L	T	NR	BP	Points	NRR	For	Against
1	Sri Lanka	8	4	3	1	0	1	19	+0.164	1977 (373.3)	1920 (374.2)
2	Australia	8	4	4	0	0	3	19	+0.454	1916 (373)	1663 (355.1)
3	India	8	3	4	1	0	1	15	−0.593	1793 (365)	2103 (382)

For information about the tournament, including match results, see 2011–12 Commonwealth Bank Series.

== Aftermath ==
The Indian cricket team, humiliated in all forms of the game in the tour, was the subject of ridicule from the media and former cricketers. The Australian wrote under the headline "India's pillars of strength reduced to useless rubble"

Dhoni is not the only shaky pillar of what only eight months ago was the number one cricket nation in the world. VVS Laxman, once the scourge of Australian bowlers, is being flayed himself at home after scores of 2,1, 2, 66, 31 and 0. Virender Sehwag, who warmed up for this series by scoring the fastest double century in One-Day International history, also is trending south faster than Scott and Amundsen, having followed up his whirlwind 67 in Melbourne with innings of 7, 30, 4, 0 and 10. Worst of all, Dhoni has failed with the bat. The Indian captain is no thunderer at the best of times – neither is coach Duncan Fletcher, which may be part of the problem – but how can he demand more of his batsmen when he has nowhere to hide behind scores of 6, 23, 57no, 2, 12 and 2? India has not had a single century-maker in the past three Tests,

The Daily Telegraph said that India's performance was "so bad that the first question that came Michael Clarke's way at the press conference was 'did it feel as if you were playing Bangladesh?'". The newspaper also played up Dhoni's one-match ban due to the Indian team's slow over-rate in the third Test. Under the headline 'Dhoni dumped from Adelaide Test', the newspaper wrote, "India's shambolic tour of Australia plunged into unprecedented disarray when their captain MS Dhoni was sensationally banned from playing in the final Test due to slow over rates". The Herald Sun wrote about how Australia built up a team after the Ashes humiliation last year while sarcastically mentioning the visiting players skipping practice sessions in the tour.

As painful as it was, getting flogged in last year's Ashes may be remembered as the recession Australia had to have. Nothing is being taken for granted in Australian cricket any more. The new coaching unit is working well under head coach Mickey Arthur and Australia has worked hard to freshen up every aspect of its game. India, by contrast, just lobs along, its players pocketing millions each year and too spoilt to make major sacrifices. It's appropriate that many Indian players spent a lot of time last week sitting under trees at training, because their entire Test match game is being left in the shade.

The Indian tour to Australia was the last international series for Rahul Dravid and VVS Laxman. Dravid announced his retirement from international cricket soon after the tour and Laxman announced his retirement after he was selected for the two match home series against New-Zealand in August 2012.
