= SPIN World Cricket Monthly Magazine =

SPIN World Cricket Monthly
- Editor: Kim Jones
- Former editors: Duncan Steer
- Categories: Cricket
- Frequency: Monthly
- Format: Print
- Founded: 2005
- First issue: 2005; 21 years ago
- Country: United Kingdom
- Language: English
- Website: spinpodcast.com

SPIN World Cricket Monthly, also known as SPIN Magazine, was a UK-based cricket magazine, established in 2005. Duncan Steer was the editor of the magazine. The magazine was latterly edited by Kim Jones, the assistant editor being Lizzy Ammon.

The magazine had a strong focus on English county cricket but contained news, features and interviews on all cricket – domestic and International.
