= Damien Martyn =

Australian cricketer (born 1971)

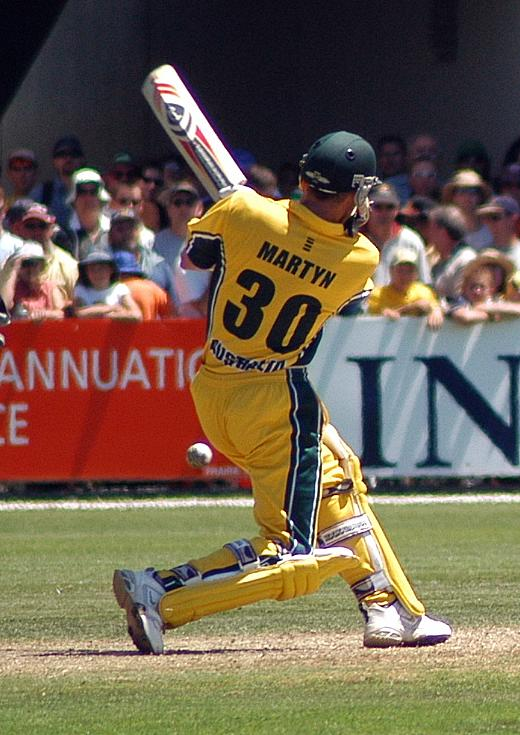
- Martyn in 2003

Personal information
- Full name: Damien Richard Martyn
- Born: 21 October 1971 (age 55); Darwin, Northern Territory, Australia
- Nickname: Marto
- Batting: Right-handed
- Bowling: Right-arm medium
- Role: Top-order batter

International information
- National side: Australia (1992–2006)
- Test debut (cap 353): 27 November 1992 v West Indies
- Last Test: 1 December 2006 v England
- ODI debut (cap 109): 8 December 1992 v West Indies
- Last ODI: 5 November 2006 v West Indies
- ODI shirt no.: 30
- T20I debut (cap 8): 17 February 2005 v New Zealand
- Last T20I: 24 February 2006 v South Africa
- T20I shirt no.: 30

Domestic team information
- Years: Team
- 1990/91–2006/07: Western Australia
- 1991: Leicestershire
- 2003: Yorkshire
- 2010: Rajasthan Royals

Career statistics
Competition	Test	ODI	FC	LA
Matches	67	208	204	299
Runs scored	4,406	5,346	14,630	8,644
Batting average	46.37	40.80	49.25	42.79
100s/50s	13/23	5/37	44/73	10/61
Top score	165	144*	238	144*
Balls bowled	348	794	3,365	1,549
Wickets	2	12	37	41
Bowling average	84.00	58.66	42.24	31.70
5 wickets in innings	0	0	0	0
10 wickets in match	0	0	0	0
Best bowling	1/0	2/21	4/30	3/3
Catches/stumpings	36/–	69/-	158/2	104/–
Medal record
Men's cricket
Representing Australia
ICC Cricket World Cup
Winner	1999 England-Wales -Ireland-Scotland-Netherlands
Winner	2003 South Africa-Zimbabwe-Kenya
Commonwealth Games
Silver medal – second place	1998 Kuala Lumpur
- Source: ESPNcricinfo, 12 May 2019

Damien Richard Martyn (born 21 October 1971) is an Australian former cricketer, who played Tests and ODIs. He played for the national team sporadically in 1992–1994 before becoming a regular Test and ODI player from 2000 until his retirement in late 2006. He was primarily a right-handed middle-order batsman with a 'classical' technique, known in particular for his elegant strokemaking square of the wicket on the off-side and through the covers. Martyn was a member of the Australian team that won two consecutive World Cups (1999 and 2003), as well as the 2006 ICC Champions Trophy.

Martyn was also an occasional medium-pacer and distinguished fieldsman primarily in the covers who was capable of creating spectacular run-outs. He also very occasionally kept wicket at first-class level. He was named man of the series in the Border–Gavaskar Trophy in 2004, to help Australia defeat India on the subcontinent for the first time in more than 30 years, and was named in early 2005 as the Australian Test Player of the Year at the annual Allan Border Medal presentations.

== Domestic career ==
Martyn moved with his family to Perth, Western Australia at the age of three, and was educated at Girrawheen Senior High School, before being selected for the Australian Cricket Academy in Adelaide in 1990. He made his first class debut for Western Australia the following season, in which he scored 822 runs at 51.37.

After returning to the domestic arena Martyn was appointed as captain of Western Australia in the 1994/95 season at the age of 23, the youngest player to have been given the honour. He also captained Australia A in the international ODI tournament of the same season. The following season, he relinquished the captaincy to Tom Moody, in order to concentrate on his batting.

On 1 September 2007, it was reported in the Daily Telegraph that Martyn had joined the break-away Indian Cricket League. However, he pulled out of the event due to the birth of his first son, Ryder, but rejoined the ICL for 2008.

On 19 January 2010, Martyn was signed for US$100,000 to play for the Rajasthan Royals in the Indian Premier League.

== International career ==
Noted for his daring and sometimes cavalier strokeplay, Martyn was selected to make his Test debut against the West Indies in November 1992 at the Gabba, a surprise replacement for Dean Jones. He batted in the middle-order, scoring 36 and 15. He played in all Tests in that season, apart from the Fourth Test at the Adelaide Oval where he was replaced by fellow Western Australian Justin Langer after sustaining an injury before the match.

However, his performances were unconvincing, totalling 168 runs at 28.16 for the series, passing 50 only once with an unbeaten 67* at the MCG. Martyn was also a member of the ODI squad in that season, playing less regularly in only four of eleven matches, and aggregating 45 runs at 22.5.

=== Struggling form ===
Martyn was subsequently dropped from the Test team in the early 1993 tour to New Zealand, until being recalled for the Third Test at Eden Park, Auckland after Mark Waugh was dropped, scoring 74. Martyn also played in some of the subsequent ODIs on the New Zealand tour as well as on the 1993 Ashes tour to England, but was dropped from the Test team after Waugh scored centuries in the warm-up matches and had been the leading run scorer in the New Zealand ODIs. Waugh was third in the Test batting averages, confining Martyn to playing in tour matches against county teams. Martyn was given another chance in the 1993–94 Australian season when Steve Waugh tore a hamstring and Martyn played in the Boxing Day and New Year's Tests at the MCG and SCG respectively. Although he managed 59 in the first innings of a low scoring match in Sydney, it was his performance in the second innings which blighted his reputation for many years into the future. With Australia stumbling while chasing a small target of 117 against South Africa, Martyn had trouble scoring, with an unconvincing 6 from 59 balls in almost two hours as he and Craig McDermott took the total from 8–75 to within sight of victory at 8–110. He then attempted an airborne cover-drive off Allan Donald and was caught, and Australia lost the Test. Martyn was heavily criticised by the media who blamed him for the defeat. He played three more ODIs in that season, before being dropped upon Waugh's return from injury. Although Waugh would have reprised his position in any case, Martyn lost his position as the reserve batsman and was dropped from subsequent national squads altogether. He would not play ODI cricket again until 1997 and Tests until 2000.

=== Late career ===
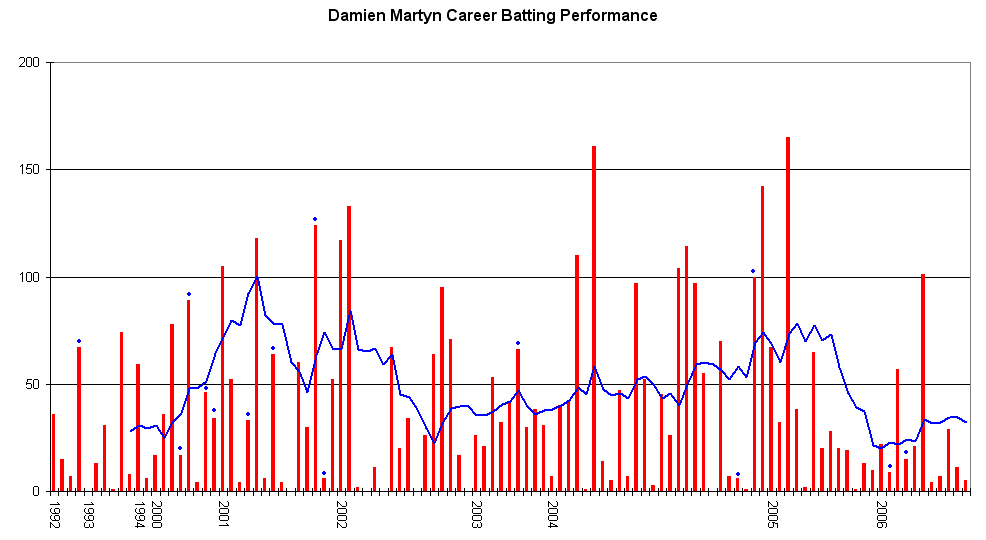
Damien Martyn's career performance graph.

He re-appeared at the start of the millennium when he replaced an injured Ricky Ponting on the tour to New Zealand in early 2000. Despite topping the averages in New Zealand he made way for Ponting for the home series against the West Indies in 2000/01. He played one test during that summer, replacing an injured Steve Waugh for Australia's victory at Adelaide where he remained not out in both innings.

He was selected on Australia's tour to India in 2001 and was considered unlucky not to replace a struggling Ponting. His chance to consolidate a permanent position in the side came during the 2001 Ashes tour where he replaced fellow West Australian Justin Langer in the first test. He posted his maiden test century in the first test at Edgbaston. He was chosen as a Wisden Cricketer of the Year as a result of his performances in The Ashes in the summer of 2001.

Martyn subsequently put in regular appearances for Australia, becoming integral to the middle-order and eventually filling the void at no. 4 left by Mark Waugh's international retirement. His best form came over a twelve-month period beginning in March 2004 where he scored two crucial centuries to help Australia to a 3–0 series whitewash in Sri Lanka. He was then man of the series in India when Australia claimed their first series victory on Indian soil in over 30 years. He made two centuries and narrowly missed out on becoming the first Australian batsman since Don Bradman to make three centuries in three innings when he was dismissed for 97 in the second innings of the third test. Two centuries at home against Pakistan over the 2004/05 season and another in New Zealand in 2005 rounded out a stellar 12 months in which Martyn had made 1608 runs at an average of 61.84 in 12 months including 7 test centuries.

Martyn was presented with the McGilvray Medal in 2005 as the ABC's Test cricketer of the year as well as being adjudged Test Player of the Year at the 2005 Allan Border Medal.

Following a poor Ashes tour of England in 2005, where he recorded a total of 178 runs at an average of 19.77, Martyn was dropped from the Australian Test side to play in the ICC Super Series 2005. However, he was retained in the ODI side over the 2005/06 summer.

He was recalled to the Test squad at the expense of Brad Hodge for the three-Test series in South Africa in March and April 2006. Chairman of Selectors Trevor Hohns cited his experience as the major reason for his recall. His contributions in the first two tests were minimal but he repaid the selectors' faith with an important century in the second innings of the third test that helped guide Australia to victory.

In the 2006 Champions Trophy Tournament, Martyn won back-to-back man of the match awards against England and India. He also played an important unbeaten innings in the final against the West Indies to help Australia win the tournament for the first time. He was Australia's leading runscorer in the tournament.

=== Retirement ===
Martyn played in the first two Tests of the 2006/07 Ashes series, where he managed to score just 45 runs in three innings. Dismissed for only 5 playing a rash shot in Australia's run chase in the second Test, his place in the side came under increasing scrutiny in the media, although he received several statements of support from members of the Australia team, notably Mike Hussey and Justin Langer.

Despite his poor form Martyn was widely expected to retain his place due to Shane Watson's lack of fitness and the fact that the third test was to be played at the WACA Ground, Martyn's home ground. It came as a surprise when on 8 December 2006, Martyn announced his immediate retirement from all domestic and international cricket. Commenting on his decision, Martyn said: "I would like to advise of my retirement from cricket, effective from today. I do so with a deep awareness of the opportunities that the game and Cricket Australia have provided for me." Cricket Australia CEO James Sutherland insisted that Martyn had not been pushed and that Martyn was originally going to be named in the squad for the third Test.

== Records and achievements ==
=== International centuries ===
Martyn scored a century (100 runs or more) on 13 occasions in Test cricket and 5 in One Day International (ODI) matches, but has not scored a century in Twenty20 international.

==== Test centuries ====
Martyn scored his first century, about 9 years after making his debut, in The Ashes, against England on 5 July 2001 at Edgbaston Cricket Ground, Birmingham scoring 105 runs in the process. His performance in the series earned him the Wisden cricketer of the year award for 2001. His highest score of 165 runs came against New Zealand on 18 March 2005 at Basin Reserve, Wellington. His last Test century was against South Africa on 31 March 2006 at The Wanderers Stadium, Johannesburg where he scored 101 runs. Out of his 13 Test centuries, 8 has been scored on the first innings and the rest 5 in the second innings.

No.	Score (Note: – Remained not out.)	Against	Pos. (Note: Position in the batting order.)	Inn. (Note: The number of the innings in the match.)	Test (Note: The number of the Test match, and the total number of matches played in that series.)	Venue	H/A (Note: Whether Australia were playing at home or away, or the match was held at a neutral venue.)	Date	Result (Note: The result of the match: whether it was won or lost by Australia, or the match was drawn or tied.)
1	105	England	6	1	1/5	Edgbaston, Birmingham	Away	5 July 2001	Won
2	118	England	5	1	4/5	Headingley, Leeds	Away	16 August 2001	Lost
3	124*	South Africa	6	1	1/3	Adelaide Oval, Adelaide	Home	14 December 2001	Won
4	117	South Africa	6	1	3/3	Sydney Cricket Ground, Sydney	Home	2 January 2002	Won
5	133	South Africa	6	1	1/3	The Wanderers Stadium, Johannesburg	Away	22 February 2002	Won
6	110	Sri Lanka	4	2	1/3	Galle International Stadium, Galle	Away	8 March 2004	Won
7	161	Sri Lanka	4	2	2/3	Asgiriya Stadium, Kandy	Away	16 March 2004	Won
8	104	India	5	2	2/4	MA Chidambaram Stadium, Chennai	Away	14 October 2004	Drawn
9	114	India	4	1	3/4	Vidarbha Cricket Association Ground, Nagpur	Away	26 October 2004	Won
10	100*	Pakistan	4	2	1/3	Western Australia Cricket Association Ground, Perth	Home	16 December 2004	Won
11	142	Pakistan	4	1	2/3	Melbourne Cricket Ground, Melbourne	Home	26 December 2004	Won
12	165	New Zealand	4	1	2/3	Basin Reserve, Wellington	Away	18 March 2005	Drawn
13	101	South Africa	4	2	3/3	New Wanderers Stadium, Johannesburg	Away	31 March 2006	Won

==== ODI centuries ====
Martyn's first ODI century came against New Zealand on 3 March 2000 at Eden Park, Auckland, he scored 116 and remained not out. A knock of 144 runs from 149 balls against Zimbabwe on 4 February 2001 at the WACA Ground, Perth is his highest ODI score. His last ODI century was against India on 1 November 2003 at Wankhede Stadium, Mumbai where he scored 100 runs and also won the man of the match award.

No.	Score	Against	Pos.	Inn.	S/R (Note: Batting strike rate.)	Venue	H/A/N	Date	Result
1	116*	New Zealand	2	1	85.92	Eden Park, Auckland	Away	3 March 2000	Lost
2	144*	Zimbabwe	2	1	96.64	WACA, Perth	Home	4 February 2001	Won
3	104*	South Africa	4	1	85.95	Brisbane Cricket Ground, Brisbane	Home	20 January 2002	Won
4	101*	England	4	1	88.59	Bellerive Oval, Hobart	Home	11 January 2003	Won
5	100	India	4	1	84.03	Wankhede Stadium, Mumbai	Away	1 November 2003	Won

== Health issues ==
On 26 December 2025, Martyn fell ill and was rushed to hospital and placed in an induced coma, after being diagnosed with Meningitis. Having been described as in a "fight for his life", Martyn awoke from his coma on 4 January 2026, with the news announced by his close friend and former teammate, Adam Gilchrist.
