= Steve Smith (cricketer) =

Australian cricketer (born 1989)

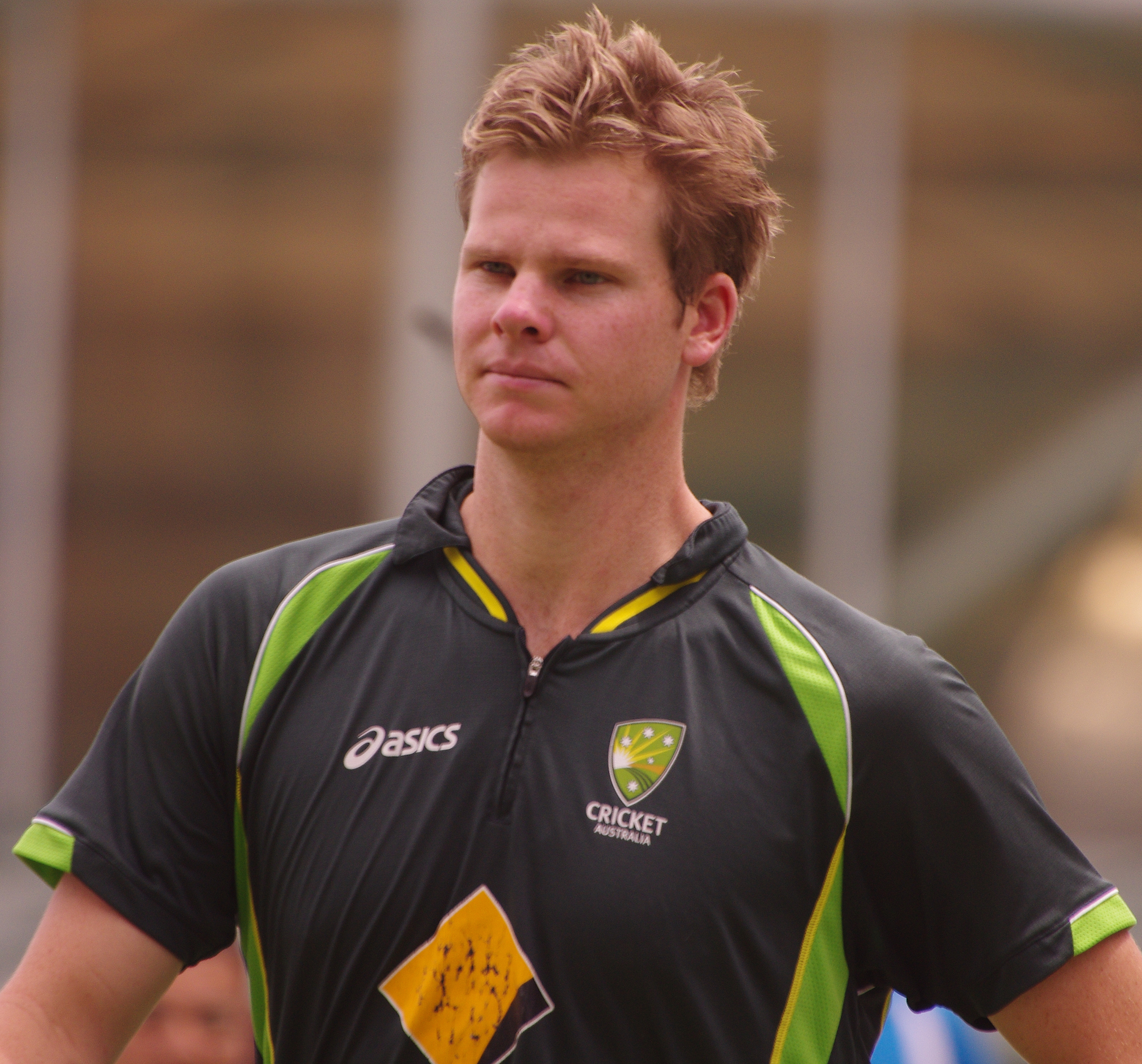
- Smith in 2014

Personal information
- Full name: Steven Peter Devereux Smith
- Born: 2 June 1989 (age 37); Kogarah, New South Wales, Australia
- Nickname: Smudge
- Height: 176 cm (5 ft 9 in)
- Batting: Right-handed
- Bowling: Right-arm leg break
- Role: Top-order batter

International information
- National side: Australia (2010–present)
- Test debut (cap 415): 13 July 2010 v Pakistan
- Last Test: 18 October 2026 v South Africa
- ODI debut (cap 182): 19 February 2010 v West Indies
- Last ODI: 4 March 2025 v India
- ODI shirt no.: 49
- T20I debut (cap 43): 5 February 2010 v Pakistan
- Last T20I: 25 February 2024 v New Zealand
- T20I shirt no.: 49

Domestic team information
- Years: Team
- 2007/08–present: New South Wales
- 2010: Worcestershire
- 2011/12–present: Sydney Sixers
- 2012–2013: Pune Warriors
- 2014–2015: Rajasthan Royals
- 2016–2017: Rising Pune Supergiant
- 2018: Barbados Tridents
- 2018: Toronto Nationals
- 2019: Comilla Victorians
- 2019–2020: Rajasthan Royals
- 2021: Delhi Capitals
- 2023: Sussex
- 2024, 2026: Washington Freedom
- 2025: Welsh Fire
- 2026: Multan Sultans
- 2026: Amsterdam Flames

Career statistics
Competition	Test	ODI	FC	LA
Matches	127	170	192	220
Runs scored	11,003	5,800	15,859	7,873
Batting average	55.29	43.28	53.75	46.31
100s/50s	37/45	12/35	54/68	15/50
Top score	239	164	239	164
Balls bowled	1,470	1,076	5,395	2,030
Wickets	19	28	72	47
Bowling average	53.05	34.67	51.80	39.14
5 wickets in innings	0	0	1	0
10 wickets in match	0	0	0	0
Best bowling	3/18	3/16	7/64	3/16
Catches/stumpings	224/–	90/–	320/–	119/–
Medal record
Men's cricket
Representing Australia
ICC Cricket World Cup
Winner	2015 Australia & New Zealand
Winner	2023 India
ICC T20 World Cup
Winner	2021 UAE & Oman
Runner-up	2010 West Indies
ICC World Test Championship
Winner	2021–2023
Runner-up	2023–2025
- Source: CricInfo, 22 October 2026

Steven Peter Devereux Smith (born 2 June 1989) is an Australian international cricketer, former captain of the Australian national team in all three formats of the game and since 2021, the vice-captain of the Australian Test team. He is regarded as one of the greatest Test batsmen of his generation, scoring over 11,000 Test runs, having reached an ICC Test batting rating of 947, the second-highest figure of all time, only behind Don Bradman's 961 and was named ICC Men's Test Player of the Decade for 2011–2020.

Although he was initially selected for Australia as a leg-spinning all-rounder in all formats in 2010, Smith was always earmarked as a batting prospect following successful batting campaigns in domestic cricket early in his career. After playing five Test matches from 2010 to 2011 as a bowling all-rounder, he was recalled to the Australian Test team in 2013 as a batsman and took over the captaincy from Michael Clarke in late 2015. Smith now plays primarily as a batsman, and has predominantly batted at number 4 in Test cricket and number 3 in ODIs and T20Is.

Awards he has won include the Sir Garfield Sobers Trophy (ICC Cricketer of the Year) in 2015 becoming the youngest player to ever win the award, ICC Test Player of the Year in 2015 and 2017 becoming the only player to win the award more than once, the Compton–Miller Medal for player of the series in the 2017–18 and 2019 Ashes being the only player to win the award more than once, the Allan Border Medal for the best player in Australian Cricket in 2015, 2018, 2021 and 2023 which is tied for the most of all time, Australian Test Player of the Year in 2015 and 2018, Australian One Day International Player of the Year in 2015 and 2021, ICC Men's Test Team of the Decade for 2011–2020, ICC Test Team of the Year in 2015, 2016, 2017 and 2019 and ICC ODI Team of the Year in 2015. He was named by Wisden as one of their Cricketers of the Year in the 2016 Wisden Almanack.

Smith was a core member of the Australian white-ball teams that won the 2015 ICC Cricket World Cup, 2021 ICC Men's T20 World Cup and the 2023 ICC Cricket World Cup and was vice-captain of the Australia Test team that won the 2021–23 ICC World Test Championship.

In March 2018, Smith as Australian captain was widely criticised for the ball tampering incident which occurred in the third Test against South Africa. During the Test, Smith stood down from the team captaincy following immediate backlash and was replaced by Tim Paine. Following an investigation by Cricket Australia, Smith was banned from all international and domestic cricket in Australia for one year, and from consideration for any leadership role for an additional year.

In November 2021, Smith returned to an official Australian leadership role, as Test vice-captain starting in the 2021–22 Ashes series. In December 2021, Smith returned to Test captaincy duties when Pat Cummins was unavailable due to COVID-19 for the 2nd Test. He has since captained in 10 Tests for 7 wins and a draw, including Australia's only Test victory in India since 2017 when he was captain. In March 2023, Smith returned to ODI captaincy duties, he went on to captain another 13 ODIs, winning the 2022–23 ODI series vs India, the 2023–24 ODI series vs West Indies and the 2024 ODI series v England and captaining Australia in the 2025 ICC Champions Trophy. He retired from ODI cricket on 5 March 2025, leading Australia in his last ODI as captain.

== Early and personal life ==
Steve Smith was born on 2 June 1989 in Kogarah, a suburb of the St George region of Southern Sydney to an Australian father, Peter, who has a degree in chemistry, and an English mother, Gillian. Smith attended Menai High School and left at age 17 to play cricket in England.

Because his mother was born in London, Smith has dual British and Australian citizenship. In 2011, Smith started dating Dani Willis, a commerce and law student at Macquarie University. In June 2017, the couple announced their engagement while on holiday in New York. The couple married at Berrima, New South Wales on 15 September 2018.

Smith is a supporter of the Sydney Roosters in the National Rugby League.

== Youth and domestic career ==
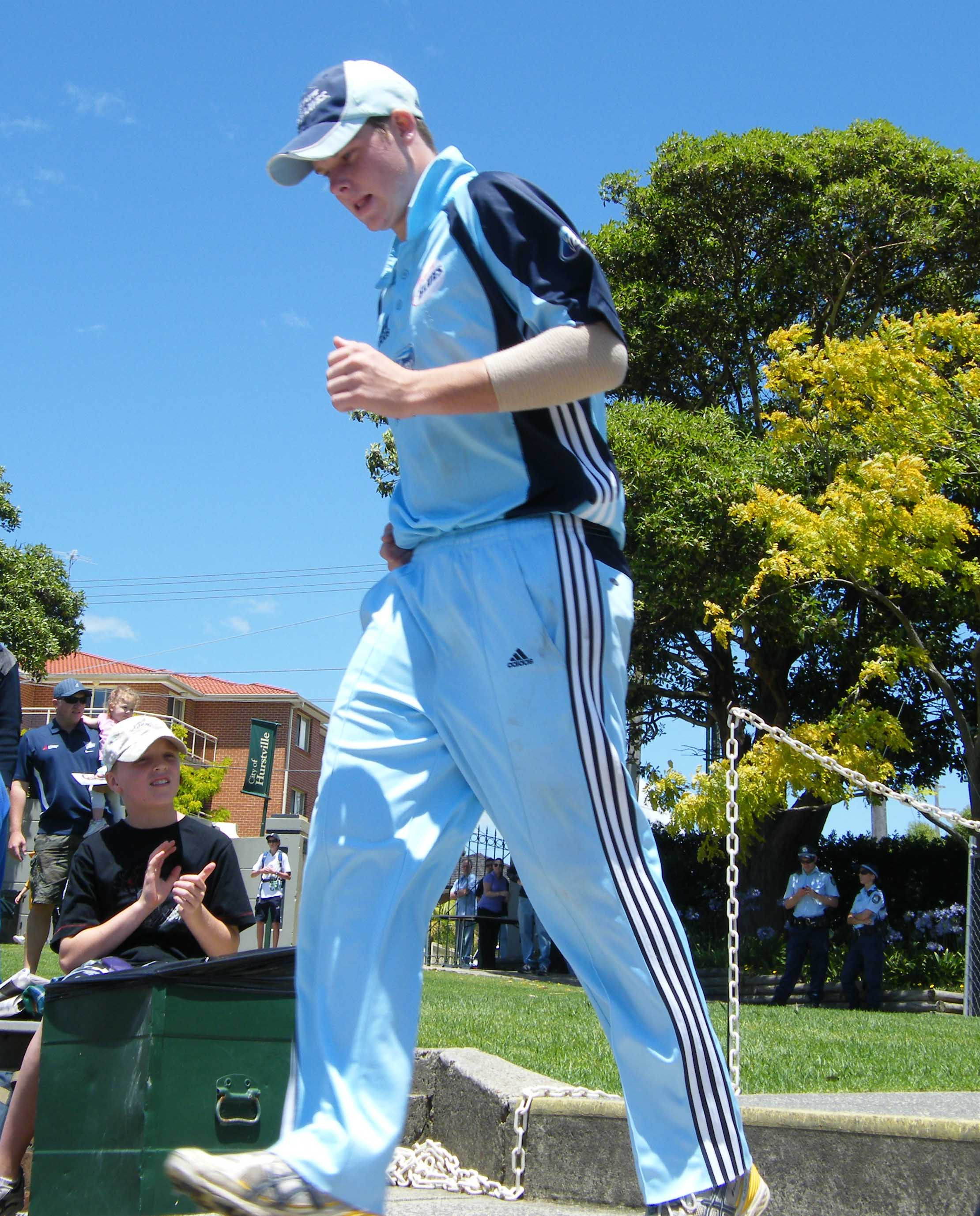
Smith fielding for New South Wales in 2008

During his junior years of cricket, Smith's role was primarily batting all-rounder, bowling fast-medium until the age of 15 before switching to leg-spin. In 2007, Smith temporarily left Australia to play cricket in England, where he played club cricket for Sevenoaks Vine in the Kent Cricket League. His outstanding performances for Sevenoaks resulted in being selected to play for Surrey County's second XI. Smith was a member of the Australian team at the 2008 Under-19 Cricket World Cup in Malaysia. In the tournament he scored 114 runs and took seven wickets in four matches.

Smith made his first-class debut for New South Wales against Western Australia at the SCG on 25 January 2008. He scored 33 runs in his only innings as New South Wales defeated Western Australia. He was part of the New South Wales team that won the 2009 Twenty20 Champions League. In the final against Trinidad and Tobago at Hyderabad, Smith delivered an all-round performance, scoring 33 runs with the bat and taking two wickets.

By the end of the 2009–10 domestic season, Smith had a first-class batting average of over 50 after 13 first-class matches. While his first-class bowling average in the high forties was not as impressive, his bowling appeared to be steadily improving following some well-publicised mentoring and praise from Shane Warne. In the final match of the season he took 7 for 64 in the second innings against South Australia.

In October 2013, Smith as captain and No.3 batsman, led NSW to their first One-Day Final for the first time since 2006 when they beat South Australia. In the 2013–14 Ryobi One-Day Cup Final against Queensland, Smith scored 61 runs, after QLD elected to bowl first. NSW reached a total of 317, and QLD chased it down in the final over with 5 balls left to spare in the match.

In March 2014, Smith batting No.3, scored 75 and 103 not out to lead NSW to draw against Western Australia in the 2013–14 Sheffield Shield final in Canberra. NSW finished 1st in the season so they claimed the title, for the first time since 2007–08.

In 2014–15, Smith did not feature in the 2014–15 domestic season, due to international commitments.

In October 2015, Smith as captain led NSW to beat South Australia in the 2015–16 Matador BBQs One-Day Cup Final at North Sydney Oval with 2 catches and 84 runs, batting No.3. NSW winning by 9 wickets with 20 overs to spare with Smith and Ed Cowan remaining not out, comfortably chasing the 221 target in 29.5 overs. Smith was the highest run scorer of the season with 435 runs, averaging 145 with 2 hundreds, 3 fifties and a highest score of 143, striking at over 100, undismissed in 3 of the 6 matches he played.

In October 2015, following the win in the 2015–16 Matador BBQs One-Day Cup Final, Smith made his only Sheffield Shield appearance for the 2015–16 season, playing again against South Australia, Smith scored 67 in the first innings and scored 152 runs from 192 deliveries in the second innings.

In October 2016, Smith scored his third consecutive Sheffield Shield century, scoring 117 against Queensland at The Gabba. This was his 10th consecutive score of 50 or more in a Sheffield Shield match innings, dating back to the 2012–13 Sheffield Shield season, when Smith scored 90 against Queensland in Canberra, November 2012.

In November 2017, against Western Australia in the Sheffield Shield at the Hurstville Oval Smith scored 76 from 130 in NSWs first innings, striking at 58.46 and in the second innings, scored 127 from 167, at strike rate of 76.01.

In 2018–19, Smith was banned from the domestic competitions for the 2018–19 cricket season due to Sandpaper Gate.

In October 2019, Smith played his first match back in Australia since returning from his Sandpaper Gate suspension, playing for NSW against Queensland at the Gabba in the opening round of the 2019–20 Sheffield Shield season. In Queensland's first innings, Smith took 2 catches and bowled 2 overs. Smith was dismissed for 0 from 5 late on day 1 by Cameron Gannon, while fellow returnee Warner scored 125 runs. In Queensland's second innings, Smith again took 2 catches and bowled 6 wicket-less overs. Smith scored 21 from 31 in the second innings.

In October 2019, Smith scored his first century in Australia since 2017, playing against Tasmania at the Drummoyne Oval in the Sheffield Shield, Smith scored a patient 106 runs from 258 deliveries at a strike rate of 41.08. In the following One-Day Cup match, Smith returned to the NSW One-Day team for the first time since he captained the 2015–16 Matador BBQs One-Day Cup Final win. Smith was out of 9 from 6 deliveries.

In November 2019, Smith scored his 12th Sheffield Shield century, playing against Western Australia, at the SCG, Smith scored an even more patient century than the previous one against Tasmania, scoring 103 runs from 295 deliveries, at a strike rate of 34.91. Smith took 1 catch and 1 wicket in the match.

In February 2021, Smith scored 127 runs from 124 deliveries against Victoria in the 2020–21 Marsh One-Day Cup at North Sydney Oval. Smith also bowled 2 wicket-less overs with the ball.

In October 2024, Smith returned to the Sheffield Shield for the first time since the 2020–21 Shield season. Playing against Victoria, batting in his customary No.3 position for NSW, Smith was out caught for 3 off 29 in the 1st innings and was out for 0 from 4, lbw to Scott Boland. Smith also made an appearance for NSW in the Dean Jones Trophy for the first time since the 2020–21 Marsh One-Day Cup. Smith scored 56 from 53 deliveries before falling lbw to Peter Siddle.

In October 2025, Smith scored his 13th Sheffield Shield century, for NSW, against Queensland at the Gabba. Smith batted at No.4 for NSW for the first time since 2013, with Smith only batting No.4 once when Nathan Lyon was used as a nightwatchman in 2021 against Victoria.

In November 2025, Smith was re-instated as NSW captain. In his first game as NSW captain since 2017, against Victoria at the SCG, Smith batted fluently in both innings scoring half centuries in both innings, while the rest of his teammates struggled with the bat. Smith was undismissed in the 4th innings while he only was dismissed taking a risk while wickets fell around him in the 2nd innings. Victoria won by 300 runs.

In Australia's One-Day Domestic Competition, Smith has the second highest average of all time with 58.09, only behind Michael Bevans 61.18 for those that have scored at least 500 runs.

=== Big Bash League ===
Smith made his Twenty20 cricket debut for New South Wales in a match against South Australia at Adelaide on 1 January 2008 during the six team KFC Big Bash competition. Smith was the leading wicket taker at the 2008 Big Bash tournament. He took 4/15 against Queensland and finished with 9 wickets overall. He was also named the second-best player of the tournament. Smith batted across the order from 3 to 7 during the two seasons of the competition.

In 2011–12, the Australian T20 competition became the city-based Big Bash League featuring eight teams. Smith joined the Sydney Sixers and filled in as captain when Brad Haddin could not play due to Test duties, subsequently leading the team to victory in the inaugural season. As an all-rounder, he scored 166 runs with the bat from nine matches with a strike rate of 130.71, including one half century. With the ball, he took 6 wickets at an economy rate of 8.06 per over. He also took nine catches throughout the tournament. In the BBL01 final, Smith captained the Sixers to the title against the Perth Scorchers by 7 wickets while chasing down the target of 157 within 18.5 overs after the Scorchers made 5/156 in 20 overs. Smith batted at No. 4 and No.5 for the Sixers during this period.

In October 2016, Smith took on an official ambassador role for the Sixers, given his international commitments as Australian captain in all formats, he was unable to appear in a playing capacity.

In November 2019, Smith signed with the Sixers for their final four matches of BBL09.

In January 2020, Smith made his first BBL appearance since BBL03, against the Brisbane Heat at The Gabba. Smith took 2 catches but only scored 9 from 9, with the Sixers winning by 8 wickets. Smith took on the No.3 role for the Sixers for the first time. His best performance was a man of the match performance against the Melbourne Renegades at the Sydney Cricket Ground, scoring 66 not out from 44 deliveries. In February 2020, Smith played in the BBL09 final against the Melbourne Stars, scoring 21 runs from 12 deliveries. This was Smith's second BBL title, after winning the inaugural title as captain.

In October 2020, during COVID-19, Smith ruled out playing for the Sixers during BBL10.

In January 2022, Cricket Australia blocked Steve Smith from playing in the BBL11 finals on a technicality that he wasn't registered in the player pool, having expected international commitments to have made him unavailable. This decision drew criticism from past players including former England captain Michael Vaughan who labelled the decision "bonkers" and Michael Hussey who said "I can't believe it." .

In December 2022, Smith signed a "marquee" 2-year contract to return to the Sixers for BBL12. In his first match back, Smith was promoted to open the batting for the first time in the Big Bash. Smith scored 36 runs in a 6 run win against the Scorchers. In his second match, against Adelaide Strikers, Smith scored his maiden BBL century, he scored 101 runs off 56 deliveries as the Sixers won by 59 runs. In the next match, Smith scored back to back BBL hundreds with 125* runs off 66 deliveries against Sydney Thunder.

In December 2023, Smith was only available for 2 matches of BBL13. He produced another man of the match performance against the Renegades', scoring 61 from 42 deliveries.

In August 2024, Smith signed a three-year contract with the Sixers.

In January 2025, Smith scored his 3rd BBL century, in BBL14, against the Perth Scorchers at the SCG, scoring 121 runs from 64 deliveries in a 14-run win. Smith backed it up with a second straight man of the match, against the Strikers, scoring 52 runs from 31 deliveries, in a 3-wicket win.

In January 2026, Smith scored his 4th BBL century, in BBL15, against the Thunder at the SCG, scoring 100 runs from 41 deliveries in a 5-wicket victory. Smith broke a BBL record for Most Runs in an over with 32 runs, after Smith declined a single to team mate Babar Azam at the end of the previous over.

Smith has the most BBL centuries of all time with 4 from 35 innings and has the highest batting average in the competition's history of any player with more than 1150 runs scored.

=== Indian Premier League ===
Smith was first bought by Royal Challengers Bangalore for the 2010 Indian Premier League as a replacement for Jesse Ryder. During the 2011 IPL player auction, he was bought by Kochi Tuskers Kerala for $200,000, but he had to have an ankle operation and was not available to play for them that season.

The next season, Kochi Tuskers were dropped from the IPL and Smith was put up for auction. He went unsold at the 2012 IPL Players Auction, but was later bought as a replacement for Mitchell Marsh by the Pune Warriors India following Smith's good form during the Big Bash League, attracted the attention of former India Captain Sourav Ganguly, and was recruited to play for the Pune Warriors India team captained by Sourav Ganguly in the 2012 Indian Premier League. Smith was also made captain of the team for one match, when Ganguly was rested, despite Australian captain Clarke being the vice-captain. He continued to play for the same franchise in 2013, under the captaincy of Angelo Mathews. In his first match for his new team, he scored 39 runs off 32 balls to lead his team to victory against the Mumbai Indians. He received the Man of the Match award for this effort.

In the auction for IPL 2014, Smith was bought by Rajasthan Royals for $600,000. Smith was given the captaincy of the Royals in the latter half of the 2015 season and led the team to significant victories, thus ensuring a berth for his team in the play-off part of the tournament.

During the 2016 IPL Auction, Smith was bought by new franchise, the Rising Pune Supergiants for the same price as in the previous auction ($600,000), and struggled early for form. Smith finally broke a run of low scores against Sunrisers Hyderabad, scoring 46*. His form continued as he registered his maiden T20 century against the Gujarat Lions, scoring 101 off 54 balls. He then went on to score a further 45 against the Mumbai Indians, before being ruled out of the remainder of the tournament with a wrist injury.

The Supergiant management axed MS Dhoni as captain and named Smith as captain for the 2017 season. In RPS's first game against Mumbai Indians, Smith led his team to victory in style, scoring 84* and was awarded the Man of The Match. However, three consecutive losses left his team in last position on the points table. A total of 8 wins in 10 matches helped the Supergiants finish in the second position, and thus qualify for the playoffs, with Smith receiving praise for his captaincy from renowned cricketers and experts like Sunil Gavaskar and Kevin Pietersen. He led his team to the final with a 20-run victory over Mumbai Indians in Qualifier 1. In the final, Smith's men faced Mumbai yet again. Smith scored 51 off 50 balls but could not lead RPS to victory. Supergiants lost the match by one run. Smith was RPS's highest run scorer in the tournament, scoring 472 runs at an average of 39.33, including three 50's.

In February 2018, he was named as captain of Rajasthan Royals for the IPL 2018. However, following his admission of involvement in the Australian test team's ball tampering controversy in the Third Test in South Africa in March 2018, it was announced by the team that Smith has stood down from that role and Ajinkya Rahane took charge as the new captain for Rajasthan Royals team.

On 28 March 2018, after being banned by Cricket Australia for his involvement in a ball tampering incident, Smith's player contract with the Royals was terminated by the Board of Control for Cricket in India as Steve Smith and fellow Australian batsman David Warner were banned from playing for their respective teams for the upcoming 2018 IPL edition.

In November 2018, Smith was retained by Rajasthan Royals for the 2019 Indian Premier League. After losing six out of first eight matches of the season, Smith was appointed as the captain of the Rajasthan Royals by replacing Ajinkya Rahane. In the tournament, he scored 319 runs at an average of 39.87, including three fifties.

He went unsold in the 2022 IPL auctions.

=== Other T20 franchise cricket ===
In May 2018, Smith was named as one of the ten marquee players for the first edition of the Global T20 Canada cricket tournament. On 3 June 2018, he was selected to play for the Toronto Nationals in the players' draft for the inaugural edition of the tournament. In his first representative match since his conviction for ball-tampering, Smith scored 61 runs from 41 balls alongside Anton Devcich as the Toronto Nationals won by six wickets against the Vancouver Knights. In the tournament he scored 167 runs in six matches at an average of 33.40, including two fifties.

In July 2018, Smith was named in Barbados Tridents' squad in the sixth edition of Caribbean Premier League.

In September 2018, Smith returned to Australian club cricket playing in the NSW Premier Cricket competition. His return was highlighted by scoring 85 off 91 balls for Sutherland in a one-day match against Mosman. In October 2018, he was named as one of the fourteen Platinum category players for the fourth edition of the Pakistan Super League.

In December 2018, Smith was named in Comilla Victorians' squad in the sixth edition of Bangladesh Premier League. He played only two matches of the tournament before returning to Australia for elbow surgery.

In April 2024, Smith signed with Washington Freedom to feature in the second edition of Major League Cricket (MLC). He was named as captain and in July 2024, Smith led the team to victory in the 2024 MLC Final. Smith was subsequently awarded the Player of the match award, scoring 88 runs off 52 deliveries, with head coach Ricky Ponting stating post-game that Smith almost won the game by himself with his bat and with his captaincy.

=== English domestic cricket ===
In June 2010, Smith played 5 matches in the 2010 Twenty20 Cup for Worcestershire. Smith scored 67 runs from 4 innings batting No.5 and picked up 6 wickets.

In October 2019, Smith alongside Australia teammate Mitchell Starc was selected by the Welsh Fire for the inaugural The Hundred season in 2020.

In February 2020, Smith was appointed as the inaugural Welsh Fire captain for the inaugural season of The Hundred.

In May 2020, The Hundred was postponed for a year due to COVID-19.

In February 2021, Smith, along with Starc opted against playing in The Hundred.

In January 2023, Smith signed a short-term deal with Sussex for three games in 2023.

In May 2023, Smith made his debut for Sussex in the County Championship against Worcestershire, batting at No.5, Smith scored 30 runs, took 3 catches and bowled 2.4 overs in a draw. Against Leicestershire, Smith only managed to score 3 runs before he was out lbw. He took 1 catch and bowled 1 over, with the match resulting in another draw. In his third match for Sussex, against Glamorgan, Smith scored 89 runs before he was again out lbw. He bowled 10.5 overs, taking 2 wickets, and bowled 2 maidens, along with taking 2 catches in the field.

In February 2025, Smith again signed with the Welsh Fire.

In August 2025, Smith made his debut in The Hundred, playing all 8 matches with the Fire failing to reach the finals. Smith opened the batting but struggled to make a big impact, with a highest score of 47 not out from 36 deliveries.

== International career ==
=== 2010–2011: Debut and early international career ===
Steve Smith made his international cricket debut in a Twenty20 International match playing as a leg spinner against Pakistan at Melbourne in February 2010. The same month, he made his One Day International debut against the West Indies also at Melbourne, playing in the fifth match of the series.

In the 2010 ICC World Twenty20 competition held in the West Indies, Australia finished runners up to England. Smith took 11 wickets in seven matches at an average of 14.81 to finish as the equal-second-highest wicket-taker of the tournament.

Smith made his Test debut at Lord's in July 2010, playing both Tests against Pakistan in the 2010 Test series played in England. He was selected mainly for his bowling, and batted down the order, although his bowling was not required in the first innings. In the second innings, he took 3 wickets for 51 as Australia won by 150 runs. In the second Test he was called to bowl only ten overs and took no wickets, although he played an impressive role with the bat in the second innings. Batting with the tail, he scored 77 including nine fours and two sixes off successive balls, helping Australia to set a competitive target after having been bowled out for 88 in the first innings.

Smith's fielding attracted attention during the 2009–10 season with some spectacular catches in the outfield.

In the 2010–11 Australian summer, Smith played three Tests in the 2010–11 Ashes series, this time playing more as a batsman, taking the number six spot in the order. His performances were solid during the series, getting a number of starts and scoring two half centuries. Following the 2010–11 Ashes, Smith did not play another Test for two years, his next Test series coming against India in March 2013.

=== 2013–15: Return and breakthrough ===
==== Tour of India and back-to-back Ashes 2013–14 ====
Smith's return to the test team came during the 2013 tour of India. In the previous two Sheffield seasons his form had been middling, averaging 37, but he was chosen for the 17-man squad, primarily as a backup batsman, rather than an allrounder as he had been in the Test team previously. Smith was selected for the third test in Mohali, his first in over two years, when four players were dropped for "not doing their homework", in a scandal known as Homeworkgate.

In his first Test innings in India, batting at No.5 for the first time in Test cricket, he scored 92 before being stumped by Dhoni from a delivery by Pragyan Ojha, and in the second innings he managed 5 runs. In the final Test match at Delhi, Smith made 46 and 18 runs, respectively, but Australia was unable to win the Test match as India secured a 4–0 series win.

Following the defeat to India, Australia's next series was against England in the British Isles in July. Although the squad for the 2013 Ashes was finalised in April, Smith was the vice-captain of Australia's A team and was later called into the main squad after showing some promise in the Australia's A tour to the United Kingdom in June where he made 133 runs against Ireland in Belfast but also as a backup batsman due to Clarke's fitness concerns. He played his first-class tour match with the main squad on 2 July 2013 in Worcester making 111 runs in both innings combined. In the first Test match at Trent Bridge he made a half century in his first innings but fell cheaply in the second innings getting out lbw to Graeme Swann. While making little impact at Lord's, Smith produced a century at Hove against Sussex on 27 July.

In the third Test being 2–0 down to England, Australia moved up north to Old Trafford Cricket Ground in Manchester needing to win or draw to save the series. Smith made 89 and 19 runs, respectively, but the third Test match stirred controversy about the on-field umpire's decisions and DRS (Decision Review System) causing Smith to survive on two occasions and his teammate Usman Khawaja to be dismissed. In the final Test, Smith scored his maiden Test century, which came in the first innings of the last Test of the series at The Oval, reaching the total in style by hitting a six off the bowling of Jonathan Trott. He remained unbeaten on 138. Smith became only the sixth Australian to reach his maiden Test 100 with a six. At the end of the series, the urn was retained by England after winning the series 3–0. Smith played in all five Tests, scoring 345 runs at an average of 38.33.

Smith remained in the team for the first Test of 2013–14 Ashes series in Brisbane. Despite starting slowly in the first two Tests, Smith produced his first Test century on home soil in the third Test at Perth, scoring 111 from 208 balls, helping Australia display a total of 6–326 at stumps on the second day to later win the Test match and be awarded man of the match. It was during this innings at the WACA which he decided to take a "prelim movement back and across" to counter short-pitched bowling and has even exaggerated it, according to Smith, "I was probably batting on middle and leg and going to middle at that point ... I've sort of moved things a little bit across to leg stump and now I'm going just outside off stump". Smith remarked "Everything sort of just clicked into place and it felt really good so I've continued doing it". Despite his success in the first innings, he mistimed a pull shot in the second innings, the ball caught in the deep by substitute fielder Jonny Bairstow off Ben Stokes' bowling, being dismissed for 15 from 50 deliveries.

In the fourth Test at the MCG he was dismissed on 19 by Broad, but made another century with 115 runs from 154 deliveries in the first innings of the fifth and final Test at the SCG. His 128-run partnership with Haddin helped Australia come back from 5–97 to 326 all out in the first innings and eventually went on to win the Test match by 281 runs. The victory in Sydney marked a 5–0 victory towards Australia after a dismal 3–0 loss during the winter period of 2013. Smith made two centuries with a total of 327 runs at an average of 36. Smith played just one ODI match during England's tour during 2013–14, in the 4th ODI at Perth where he made 19 runs.

==== Tour of South Africa 2014 ====
Following a 5–0 victory against England in the Ashes, Australia were scheduled three Test matches and three T20 matches in South Africa. In the first Test at Centurion, Johannesburg, Smith made his fourth century and first in South Africa, where he and Shaun Marsh made a 233 run partnership from 4–98. Smith was not required in the second innings and Australia won the Test by 281 runs. The second Test in Port Elizabeth saw a slower pitch as Smith made 49 and a duck and South Africa levelled the series 1–1. In the deciding Test match in Cape Town, Smith made 84 runs from 155 deliveries in the first innings and finished 36 not out in the second innings as Australia won the series 2–1. Steve Smith produced 269 runs at an average of 67.25, the third-best in the series and the second-best by an Australian, second to Warner.

==== Tri-Series in Zimbabwe and the UAE 2014 ====
The five-month break from cricket activity saw a surprise pick of Smith called up for the 2014 Zimbabwe Tri-Series on the August 2014. Smith prior to the tour had two ODI matches in the last two years. In his first match against Zimbabwe, he was run out by Sikandar Raza. He made scores in his thirties in his participating matches but only made 10 runs in the final against South Africa on 6 September, where South Africa went on to win the Tri-Series.

The squad later travelled to the UAE to face Pakistan in a T20 Match, three ODIs and two Tests. In the first and only T20 match, Pakistan won the toss and made 96 runs in their allotment of 20 overs, setting Australia a target of 97 runs to win. Smith made three runs before being dismissed. Despite this, Australia won by six wickets.

Following the T20 came the 3-match ODI series. In the first ODI at Sharjah Cricket Stadium, Smith made his first ODI century scoring 101 runs off 118 balls to push the visitors to a 1–0 lead in the series. In the second ODI he made 12 runs and in the third and final ODI he made 77 runs off 105 balls to win the ODI match by 1 run. However, during the match, Steve Smith's catch on Fawad Alam questioned whether his catch was within the ICC laws. The incident occurred when in the 18th over of Pakistan's chase of 231 where Xavier Doherty delivered the ball and before Fawad made contact with his paddle sweep, Smith had moved from first slip towards leg slip to intercept the shot. The legality of the catch continued to be the main talking point after the ODI Series and afterwards ICC made a press statement stating that: "As long as the movement of a close catching fielder is in response to the striker's actions (the shot he/she is about to play or shaping to play), then movement is permitted before the ball reaches the striker. On the day, if umpires believe any form of significant movement is unfair (in an attempt to deceive the batsman), then the Law still applies." The win saw Australia rise back to number one in the ICC ODI Rankings and Steve Smith was made man of the series for his batting performances.

Transitioning into the Test series saw Australia's continued failure against reverse swing and spin in the subcontinent. In the warm-up match against Pakistan A in Sharjah, Australia lost by 153 runs where Smith made 58 but retired out. In the first Test in Dubai, Smith made 22 runs in the first innings and 55 runs in the second innings but collectively lost the Test match by 221 runs. In the second Test, Smith made a duck and 97 runs but Australia's woes against spin continued as Australia lost by 356 runs. In the series he made 174 runs at an average of 43.5.

==== South Africa and India in Australia 2014–15 ====
Arriving back from the subcontinent following their 2–0 Test defeat against Pakistan. Smith played in the series against South Africa where Australia defeated South Africa 4–1 in the ODI Series. He missed the first match due to selectors picking Shane Watson instead but later joined the remainder of the games due to Clarke's hamstring injury. In his first match in Perth he registered 10 runs but in the following games he made 73*, 104 and 67 runs. His hundred in the 4th ODI at the MCG was Smith's first on Australian soil. Smith scored 254 runs at an average of 84.66, the highest Australian total in the series and consequently receiving the man of the series award.

India arrived in Australia to play the Border–Gavaskar Test match series and a tri-series ODI competition with England. The first Test was scheduled to begin on 4 December in Brisbane, but was later postponed because of the death of Phillip Hughes. The first Test was later rescheduled to the Adelaide Oval on 9 December and Brisbane would be hosting the second Test on 17 December. In the first Test match in Adelaide, the Australian players wore Hughes' Test cap number 408 on their playing shirts for the match as well as black armbands in honour of their former teammate. In the first Test match in Adelaide, Smith scored 162* from 298 balls in the first and made 52* in the second innings, defeating India by 48 runs on day five. This also marked Steve Smith's first Test century against India and at the Adelaide Oval.

On 15 December, Smith was named Australia's new vice-captain and following an injury to Clarke, he was appointed stand-in skipper against India with Haddin as his deputy. He made his captaincy debut for Australia in the Second Test match against India at the Gabba. He continued his batting form and made 133 runs in the first innings before being run-out in the second innings with a score of 28. Smith was awarded man of the match as Australia defeated India by 4 wickets. Australia were then up 2–0 in the series. In the third Test at the Melbourne Cricket Ground, Smith made his third consecutive century in the first innings of the Test match scoring 192 runs from 433 balls. He also scored his 1,000th run in the 2014 calendar year, and became the eighth-fastest Australian to reach 2000 Test runs, beating previous Australian captains such as Clarke and Ricky Ponting.

The final Test match at the Sydney Cricket Ground saw Smith in his fourth consecutive century against India. The achievement saw Smith join Don Bradman (6), Neil Harvey, Jack Fingleton and Matthew Hayden (4 each) as Australian centurions in four or more consecutive Tests, a streak Smith started during the 1st Test at Adelaide. Smith also became the first Australian skipper to open their captaincy with three consecutive centuries, and the second batsman since Jacques Kallis against West Indies to score a century in every match of a Test series. The Test match ended in a draw as Australia defeated India 2–0 in the series, thus returning the Border–Gavaskar Trophy to Australia. The conclusion of the Test series saw Smith be given the man of the series award, scoring 769 runs at an average of 128.16, the highest aggregate score in a four-test match series in Australia and also marked the highest number of runs scored against India by an Australian, surpassing Donald Bradman.

Following the Test series, an ODI tri-series with India and England was confirmed in preparation for the upcoming Cricket World Cup hosted by Australia and New Zealand. In his first ODI match against England in Sydney, he was dismissed at 37 runs by Moeen Ali but continued to provide runs in the following matches leading to the final against England. En route to the tri-series final, Smith was handed his first ODI match on 20 January as the skipper after George Bailey was suspended for a slow-over rate earlier in the series. Three days later, Smith scored his first ODI century against England producing 102 runs in 95 balls; the win saw Australia qualify for the final and later defeating England to win the Carlton Mid Triangular Series in Australia 2014–15.

==== Cricket World Cup in Australia 2015 ====
In the World Cup, Smith played a vital role as versatile batsman as he played in numerous batting positions from number three down to as a middle-order batsman. In Australia's opening match of the World Cup, against England, he was dismissed early on 5 but later improved as the tournament progressed. After making half centuries against Afghanistan, Sri Lanka and Pakistan, he later steered Australia into the final after making a century against India in the semi-finals at the Sydney Cricket Ground. In the final, Australia drew against fellow neighbours New Zealand after defeating South Africa. Australia's target to chase 183 runs after a New Zealand collapse saw Steve Smith score 58 not out alongside the skipper, Clarke as Australia won by 7 wickets with 101 balls remaining. Smith was Australia's highest run scorer in the tournament, scoring 402 runs at an average of 67, including a century and four fifties. He was named in the team of the tournament for the 2015 World Cup by the ICC. He was also named in the team of the tournament by ESPNcricinfo and Cricbuzz.

==== Tour of the West Indies 2015 ====
After winning the World Cup in March, Australia's winter schedule was later released with the Test team returned from their short break towards their two Test series against the West Indies in the Caribbean. Due to IPL commitments, Smith missed out on Australia's maiden warm up match against the West Indies Cricket Board President's XI on 27 May. He later joined the Test squad in the first Test match in Windsor Park, and scored 25 and 5 runs, respectively. In the second Test match in Sabina Park, Smith steered Australia to a first innings score of 399, where he made 199 and became the eighth man in Test history to be dismissed on 199. Australia later won the match in positive fashion, beating the West Indies by 277 runs within four days and retained the Frank Worrell Trophy. After his man of the match effort against the West Indies in the second Test, Smith became the second-youngest player ever to reach the number 1 ICC Test batsmen ranking and just the eighth Australian to do so.

==== Ashes in England 2015 ====
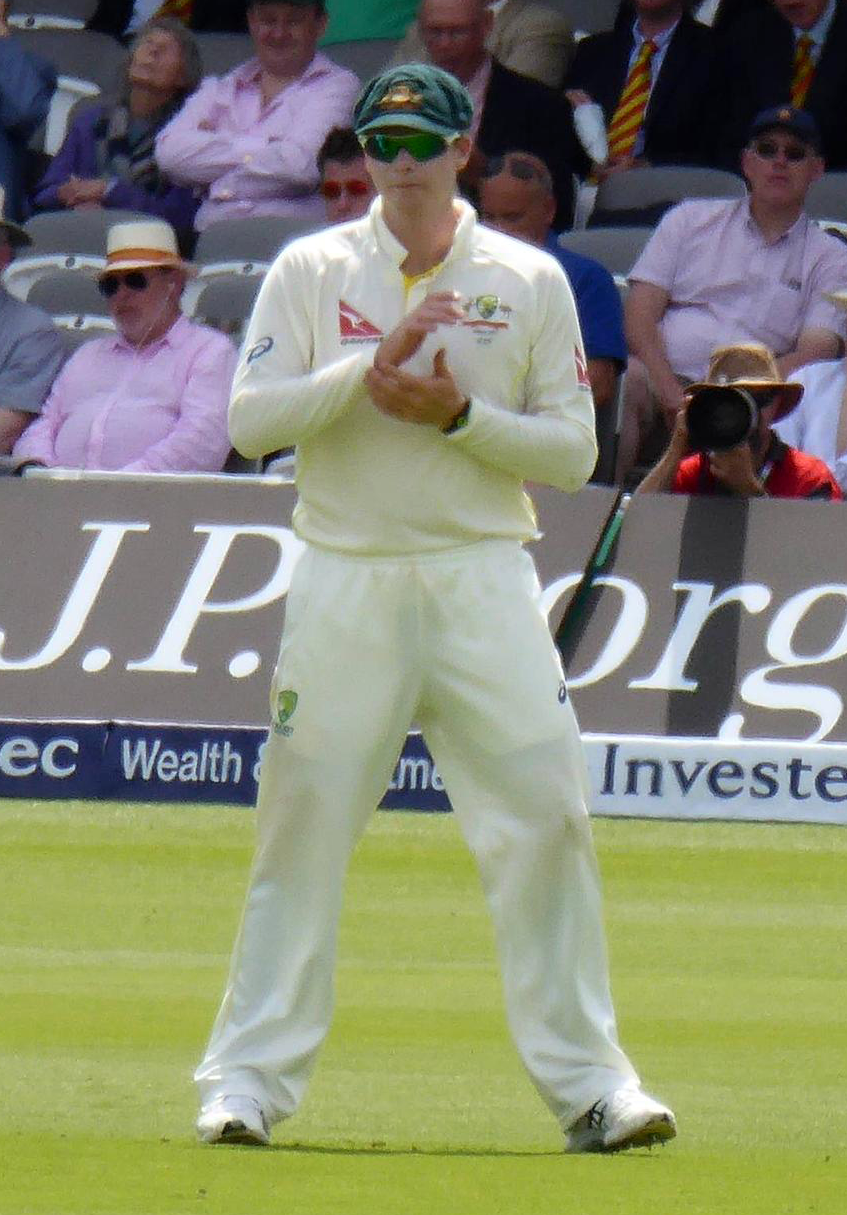
Smith fielding for Australia in the 2nd Test of the 2015 Ashes

The 2–0 victory against the West Indies gave Australia some momentum into the long-awaited Ashes series in the British Isles. While Australia's last Ashes tour was in 2013, the emergence of England's Joe Root and Australia's Steve Smith saw an awaited clash to determine the better batsman in the upcoming series. With the Australians in good form and England drawing to New Zealand and West Indies gave Australia some confidence to the countdown to the first Test in Cardiff. Smith started positively in his first-class match with a century against Kent in Canterbury. He was rested for the second first-class match and in the first Test match in Cardiff, Smith made 33 in both innings as England took a 1–0 lead in the series.

In the second Test at Lord's, Smith produced 215 runs in his first innings, his highest Test score and became the first Australian to score a double-ton at Lord's since World War II. His double century also saw Smith pass 3000 Test runs, the third-youngest Australia to reach the feat. In his second innings he made 58 runs before Australia levelled the series in a 405 run rout.

In the third Test in Edgbaston, Smith made 7 and 8 runs, respectively, both dismissed by Steven Finn, as England take a 2–1 lead into the series. In the fourth Test in Trent Bridge, Australia needed a win to draw the series. With overcast conditions and a green top, Alastair Cook won the toss and elected to field. In the first innings, Smith was dismissed again cheaply by Stuart Broad with a score of 6, as Australia capitulated in the first session of a total 60 runs from 18.3 overs. It was the quickest—in terms of balls faced—a team has been bowled out in the first innings of a Test match. In the second innings, Smith was again caught by Stokes in the slips from Broad with a meagre score of 5. England within three days regained the Ashes and took an unassailable 3–1 lead and critics began to question Smith's performances in seaming conditions. Into the fifth and final Test match back at The Oval, Smith made his second century in the series registering 143 runs off 252 balls before being bowled by Finn. Australia later defeated England by an innings and 46 runs. England had regained the Ashes 3–2 which saw the Test retirements of Australia's senior players: Clarke, Chris Rogers and later Watson, Ryan Harris and Haddin. Overall, Smith made 508 runs at an average of 56.44, the most runs scored in the series.

=== 2015–2018: Australian captaincy ===
Steve Smith's record as captain
	Matches	Won	Lost	Drawn	Tied	No result	Win %
Test	44	26	11	7	0	–	59.09%
ODI	64	32	28	0	0	4	50.00%
T20I	8	4	4	0	0	–	50.00%
Last updated:		8 January 2026					

The retirement of Clarke following Australia's 3–2 defeat in the 2015 Ashes series saw Smith appointed as the full-time captain of the Australian Test and ODI teams. Fellow New South Welshman David Warner was appointed as his vice-captain.

"At 26, he is a fine young man with extraordinary talent, excellent leadership qualities and a terrific temperament."

— former Australian cricketer Rod Marsh on Steve Smith.

==== Tour of England and Ireland 2015 ====
In August 2015, Smith was announced as Australia's new ODI captain, starting in the ODI and T20I tour of Ireland and England and with an injury to Aaron Finch, he was also named as T20I captain for the first time. In the only ODI against Ireland, at Belfast, the match was affected by rain and in a reduced-over match, Smith scored 21 runs in a 23-run win by DLS. Australia returned to England and in the only T20I, at Cardiff, Smith as captain, promoted himself to No.3 in T20Is for the first time, and scored a career-best T20I high score of 90 although that wasn't enough for an Australian victory, Australia falling short by 5 runs in the run-chase.

==== New Zealand, West Indies and ascension to captaincy 2015–16 ====
Next followed a three Test home series against New Zealand. Smith's output in the first Test in Brisbane was modest, scoring 48 and 1, as the team romped home for a win in a high scoring game. During the second Test, Smith scored 27 in the first innings before breaking the shackles with 138 in the second innings. This was Smith's first-ever second innings century; all previous centuries having been scored in the first innings of a Test match. Australia went on to draw the second Test. In the third Test, significant for being the first-ever day-night Test held at the Adelaide Oval, Smith defied difficult batting conditions to register 53 in the first innings, before falling for 14 in the second innings. Australia won the match in a tight contest.

Shortly after the series against New Zealand, a three Test series was to be held against the West Indies. During the first innings of the first Test, Smith was caught behind on 10, and did not bat again, due to Australia's dominance. The second Test was successful for the captain, scoring 134* and 70* in each respective innings, as Australia went on to seal a series victory. Due to poor weather conditions, the third Test was a wash out, with very little play able to be held.

In 2015 Smith was awarded the Sir Garfield Sobers Trophy (ICC Cricketer of the Year) and ICC Test Player of the Year award and named in ICC Test Team of the Year and ICC ODI Team of the Year by the ICC. In the same year, he also received the Allan Border Medal, Australian Test Player of the Year and Australian One Day International Player of the Year award. He was also named in the Test XI of the year 2015 by ESPNcricinfo.

==== Tour of New Zealand and T20 World Cup in India 2016 ====
A two Test return tour against New Zealand took place in February 2016. Smith looked to be in fine touch, registering 71, 138, and 53* in the three innings in which he batted, as the Australian team won 2–0.

During the T20 World Cup 2016, held in India, Smith struggled with form early, before registering 61 against Pakistan in a must-win pool match for Australia. Smith went on to score only 2 against India, as Australia were knocked out of the tournament. It was believed that Smith was incorrectly given out, having clean missed a ball the umpires deemed to have been edged.

==== Tour of Sri Lanka 2016 ====
Smith then led the Australian Cricket Team on their tour of Sri Lanka. The three Test series was a disaster for the Aussies, losing 3–0. Smith was Australia's highest run scorer in the series, scoring 247 runs at an average of 41, including one century and one fifty. Throughout the following ODI series, Smith averaged in excess of 40 across the first two matches, before leaving early for a rest.

==== ODI Tour of South Africa 2016 ====
Australia's disappointing run of form continued into their ODI tour of South Africa. They lost the first 3 matches, largely attesting to their young bowling attack's inability to contain a strong South African batting line-up. Smith was disappointing in output across the first two ODIs, before scoring 108 off 107 balls in the 3rd match, as he and Warner helped Australia to 371. Despite the large total, it was chased down by South Africa in the 50th over. Australia lost the 5-match series 5–0.

==== South Africa, New Zealand and Pakistan in Australia 2016–17 ====
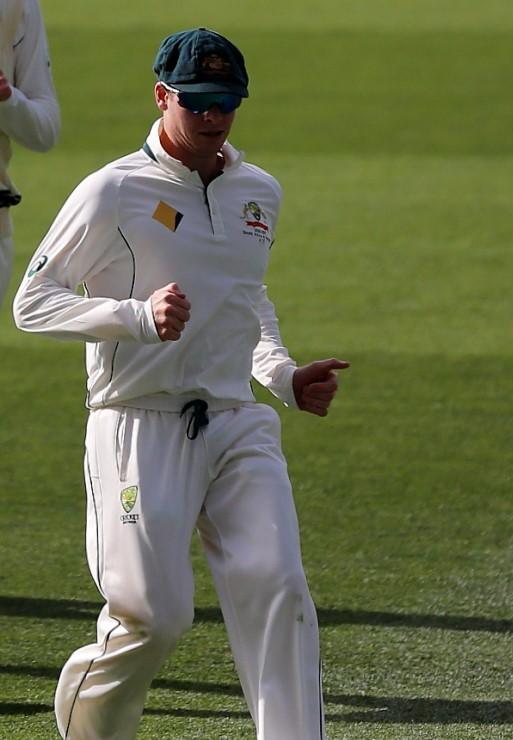
Smith playing for Australia in 2016

Following the 5–0 ODI defeat in South Africa, the Australian team returned home for a 3 Test series against South Africa. In the first Test Smith made a duck and 34 runs, and Australia lost the Test match. In the second Test at Hobart, Smith made 48 not out in the first innings but the rest of the team capitulated, making a total score of only 85 runs and losing the Test. Following the defeat, criticism of Smith's captaincy and the team's performance emerged which saw the influx of young players such as Matt Renshaw, Peter Handscomb and Nic Maddison for the last Test. After losing five consecutive Tests, Smith made 59 and 40, respectively, with the addition of his team performances to win the day-night Test match in Adelaide. The win avoided a 3–0 whitewash, as the 2–1 defeat marked Smith's first series defeat at home.

After the Test series against South Africa, New Zealand played 3 ODIs in between the two Test series against South Africa and Pakistan. In the first ODI, Steve Smith registered 164 runs at the SCG, marking the highest ODI score at the ground, beating the previous score of 162 set by AB De Villiers during the 2015 World Cup. He was awarded "man of the match". In the second ODI he made 72 runs and in Melbourne of the final ODI he was dismissed for a duck. The Australian team won the contested Chappell–Hadlee Trophy 3–0 and returned the trophy to Australia.

Pakistan was scheduled to have three Test series and 5 ODIs. In the first Test in Brisbane, Smith made 130 and 63 runs. His century in Brisbane marked his 16th Test century and his first against Pakistan. Despite Pakistan being bowled out for a low score of 142 in the first innings, Smith's captaincy tactics sparked a mixed response from critics when the on-field umpires made the decision to extend the fourth day evening session by thirty minutes, believing a result would be determined. Pakistan made a 4th innings total of 450, as Australia won by 39 runs. The second Test was held at the Melbourne Cricket Ground and Smith later placed his seventeenth century, the fourth-fastest to do so and also reaching 1000 runs in the calendar year—his third consecutive achievement of this since 2014. Despite intermittent rain, Australia managed an unlikely victory into the last session of day five, resulting in a 2–0 win for Australia. The final Test at the Sydney Cricket Ground marked Steve Smith's 50th Test match, as Australia whitewashed Pakistan 3–0 . Following the victory, he was awarded "Man of the Series" after making a total of 441 runs—the most in the series from both teams.

Smith was once again featured in ICC's 2016 Cricket Awards as a 12th man for the ICC Test team of the year. In the ODI Series against Pakistan, Smith experienced mixed results but played a vital role, with Australia later ending up routing Pakistan 4–1. On 19 January 2017, Steve Smith produced his 8th ODI century against Pakistan at the WACA Ground—becoming the quickest Australian to reach 3000 ODI runs within 79 innings. Following the home series, Smith was scheduled to tour three ODI matches against New Zealand for the Chappell–Hadlee Trophy but later sustained a mild sprain to the medial ligament in his left ankle, so he headed to Dubai in preparation for the upcoming four Test tour of India.

==== Tour of India 2017 ====
Following the training at ICC's Cricket Academy Centre in Dubai, Smith began the tour of India with a century in their maiden warm-up match in Mumbai. He replicated his ton in the first Test in Pune where he produced his first century in the Indian Subcontinent, accompanied by the support of his bowlers to win their first Test match in India since 2004 and breaking India's 19 match undefeated streak, stretching from 2012. Veteran commentator Harsha Bhogle and other Indian Media rated Smith's third innings hundred at Pune as one of the best ever by a visiting player in India. The Wisden described Smith's ton as an impossible hundred on a minefield of a pitch at Pune where all other batsman from both teams struggled to get a decent score.

Our choice as the best Test innings is when the world's leading Test batsman defied form and a devilish pitch to produce a most unlikely, match-winning hundred.

— Wisden on Smith's Pune hundred.

In the 3rd Test match in Ranchi, which is the first-ever Test match hosted at this venue, Steve Smith scored yet another century, 178 not out. This is the third-highest score by an Australian cricketer in Test matches played in India and the highest by an Australian Captain. In the fourth Test in Dharmasala, Smith scored 111 in the first innings which helped Australia to a first innings score of 300. In the second innings, Smith played a ball onto his stumps after scoring a rapid and threatening 17 runs off 15 balls. Smith was the highest run scorer in the series, scoring 499 runs at an average of 71.29, including three centuries.

==== Champions Trophy in England and Wales 2017 ====
In April 2017, Smith was named as Australia's captain for the 2017 ICC Champions Trophy.

In June 2017, in Australia's opening match, against New Zealand, Smith took a catch off Hazlewood's bowling and scored 8 runs not out in a washed-out no result. In Australia's second match, against Bangladesh, Smith took another catch from Zampa's bowling and scored 22 runs out, in another rained-out no-result. Heading into the final match against England, Australia likely needed to win to qualify for the semi-finals England won the toss and sent Australia into bat, Smith scored 56 runs from 77 before his dismissal to Mark Wood. Rain again interrupted play, with England winning by DLS method after a Stokes century and ending Australia's tournament

==== Tour of Bangladesh 2017 ====
In June 2017, Smith was named as captain for Australia's 2-Test tour of Bangladesh. In the first test at Mirpur, Smith took 1 catch and scored 8 and 37 runs, in a 20-run win for Bangladesh. In the second test at Chattogram, Smith took 2 catches and scored 58 and 16 in a 7-wicket win for Australia. The series was drawn 1–1.

==== Ashes in Australia 2017–18 ====
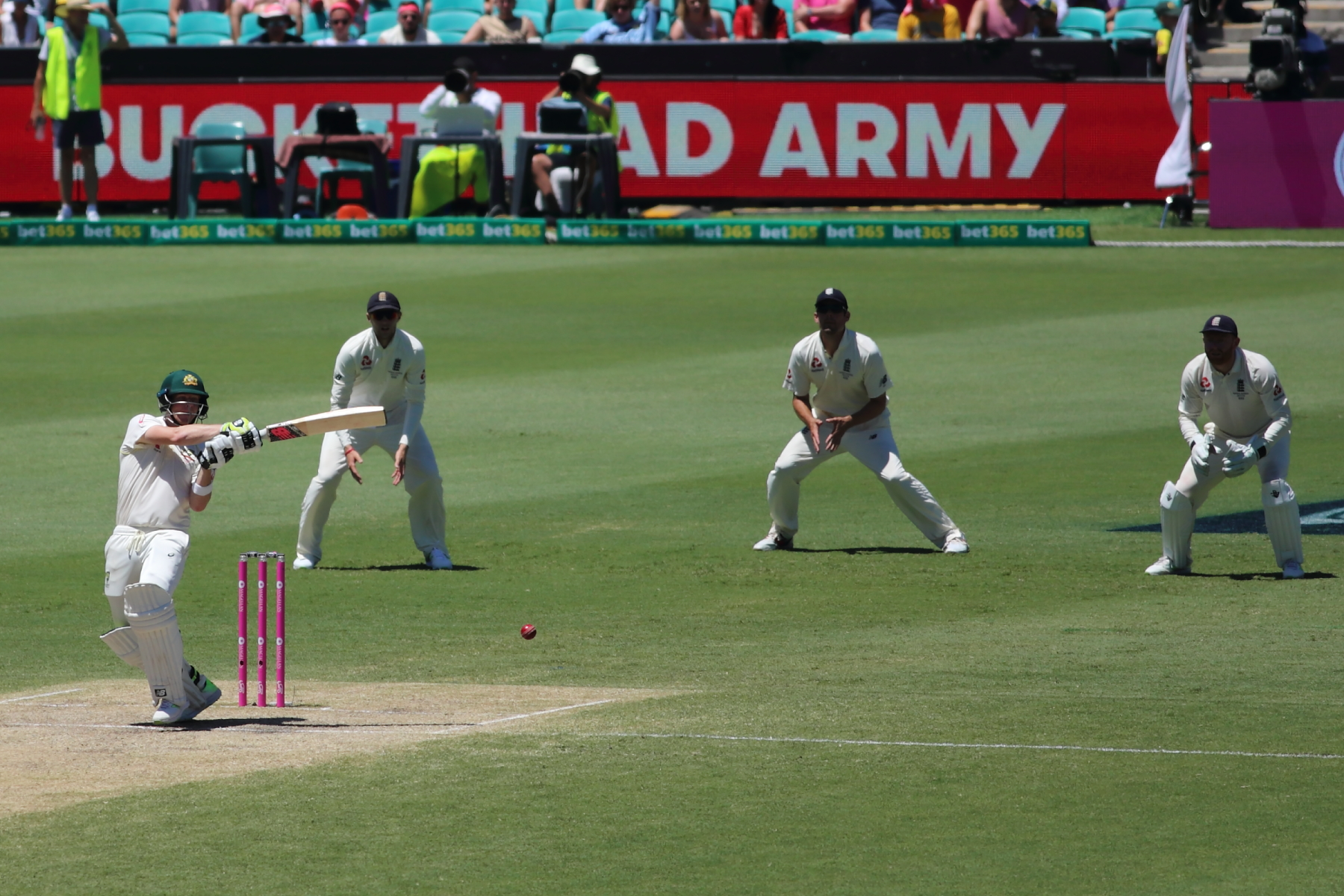
Steve Smith plays a leg side shot, in the 5th Test at Sydney.

In the first Test at Brisbane, Smith scored the first century of the series, 141*, which was his 21st Test century in his 105th innings—making him the third-quickest to score 21 Test centuries behind Donald Bradman and Sunil Gavaskar.

On 16 December 2017, Smith scored 239 in the final Ashes match at the WACA Ground. He was quick to score his 22nd century at the WACA, his century coming from 138 balls, including sixteen fours and a six, before he converted that into a career-best 239. It was his second double-hundred and his first as captain.

In the fourth Ashes test at Melbourne, Smith continued his prodigious form when he scored 76 in the first innings before he was bowled by England debutant Tom Curran, providing him with his first wicket in test cricket. A series best 244* by England's Cook then placed Australia in a tense situation that saw them trail by 164 at the start of the fourth day. Coming in at 2/65 before lunch on a rain affected day four, Smith batted until the closure of play on day five and scored yet another century, finishing with a defiant 102* from 275 deliveries to guide Australia to a draw and denying England of its first victory in Australia since 2011.

Smith concluded the 2017 calendar year with six centuries and three fifties, along with an average of 76.76 and a total of 1,305 runs, the highest of any player that year. During the final Ashes match in Sydney, Smith reached the milestone of 6,000 Test runs in 111 innings, becoming the equal second-fastest player and also the youngest Australian, ever to do so.

Smith garnered praise from opponent captain Root for leading the team from the front, and in Root's opinion Smith was the difference between the two teams during 2017–18 Ashes series. Smith was the highest run scorer in the series, scoring 687 runs at an average of 137.40, including three centuries and two fifties.

In 2017 Smith was awarded the ICC Test Player of the Year award and named in the ICC Test Team of the Year by the ICC. In February 2018 he received the Allan Border Medal and Australian Test Player of the Year award.

=== 2018: Tour of South Africa, ball-tampering incident and suspension ===
==== Tour of South Africa 2018 ====
Smith was rested for the T20 series against New Zealand and England so he could prepare for the South African Test series. The series was marred by controversial incidents on and off field. Australia won the first Test by 118 runs with Smith making scores of 56 and 38 runs. The result was overshadowed by a stairwell confrontation between Australian vice captain Warner and South African wicket-keeper Quinton de Kock. Footage emerged showing Warner having to be physically restrained after words were spoken between the two. This led to Smith and opposing captain Faf du Plessis being called to a meeting with umpires and match officials, where they were reminded of their responsibility to control their teams. South Africa won the second Test by 6 wickets, with Smith's contributions being only 25 and 11 runs. Smith's diminishing returns with the bat and lower than average strike rate suggested that he may have been struggling somewhat. During the match South African fast bowler and player of the match Kagiso Rabada was suspended for the following Test after he made physical contact with Smith after he dismissed him. Rabada successfully appealed the ban; a decision that annoyed Smith.

==== Ball-tampering incident and suspension ====
Australia lost by 322 runs in the third Test, with Smith barely contributing to the score. However, the match result was overshadowed by illegal ball tampering by players of the Australian team on the third day. Cameron Bancroft, the second-youngest and most inexperienced member of the team, was captured by television cameras surreptitiously using sandpaper to rough up the cricket ball. He then hid the sandpaper in his underwear before being confronted by the on-field umpires. When attending the press conference at the conclusion of the third day's play with Bancroft, Smith admitted that the "leadership group" of the team discussed tampering with the ball to influence the result of the match during the lunch break. He admitted that he was part of the "leadership group" but did not identify the other members. Smith and vice-captain Warner stood down from the team leadership the morning after the incident, but still played on, and wicketkeeper Paine took over as interim captain for the rest of the Test match. Subsequently, match referee Andy Pycroft for the ICC banned Smith for one Test match and fined him 100% of his match fee. He handed Bancroft three demerit points and fined him 75% of his match fee.

Cricket Australia launched an independent investigation, charging Smith with bringing the game into disrepute. He was suspended and sent home from the tour. The report stated that, while he did not develop the plan, Smith was found to have misled match officials and others, and as captain did not act to prevent it. He was therefore banned from all international and domestic cricket for 12 months starting from 29 March 2018. He was also debarred from consideration for any team leadership role for an additional 12 months. Warner and Bancroft also received bans. Smith also had his contract with the Rajasthan Royals IPL team for the 2018 season terminated by the Board of Control for Cricket in India as a consequence of the sanctions.

Smith arrived in Sydney on 29 March. In a press conference at Sydney Airport, a tearful Smith started by saying that he had nothing to add to Cricket Australia's report. He said that as captain of the Australian cricket team, he took full responsibility (even though he did not devise the plan to change the condition of the ball or actually perform the act), and that he had made a serious error in judgement: "It was a failure of leadership, my leadership." As well as apologising to his "teammates, to fans of cricket all over the world and to all Australians who are disappointed and angry", he specifically referred to the effect that the incident had had on his parents and implored others faced with questionable decisions to consider their parents. He added, "I know I will regret this for the rest of my life. I'm absolutely gutted. I hope in time I can earn back respect and forgiveness."

=== 2019: Return to international cricket, dominant Ashes series ===
==== ODI World Cup in England 2019 ====
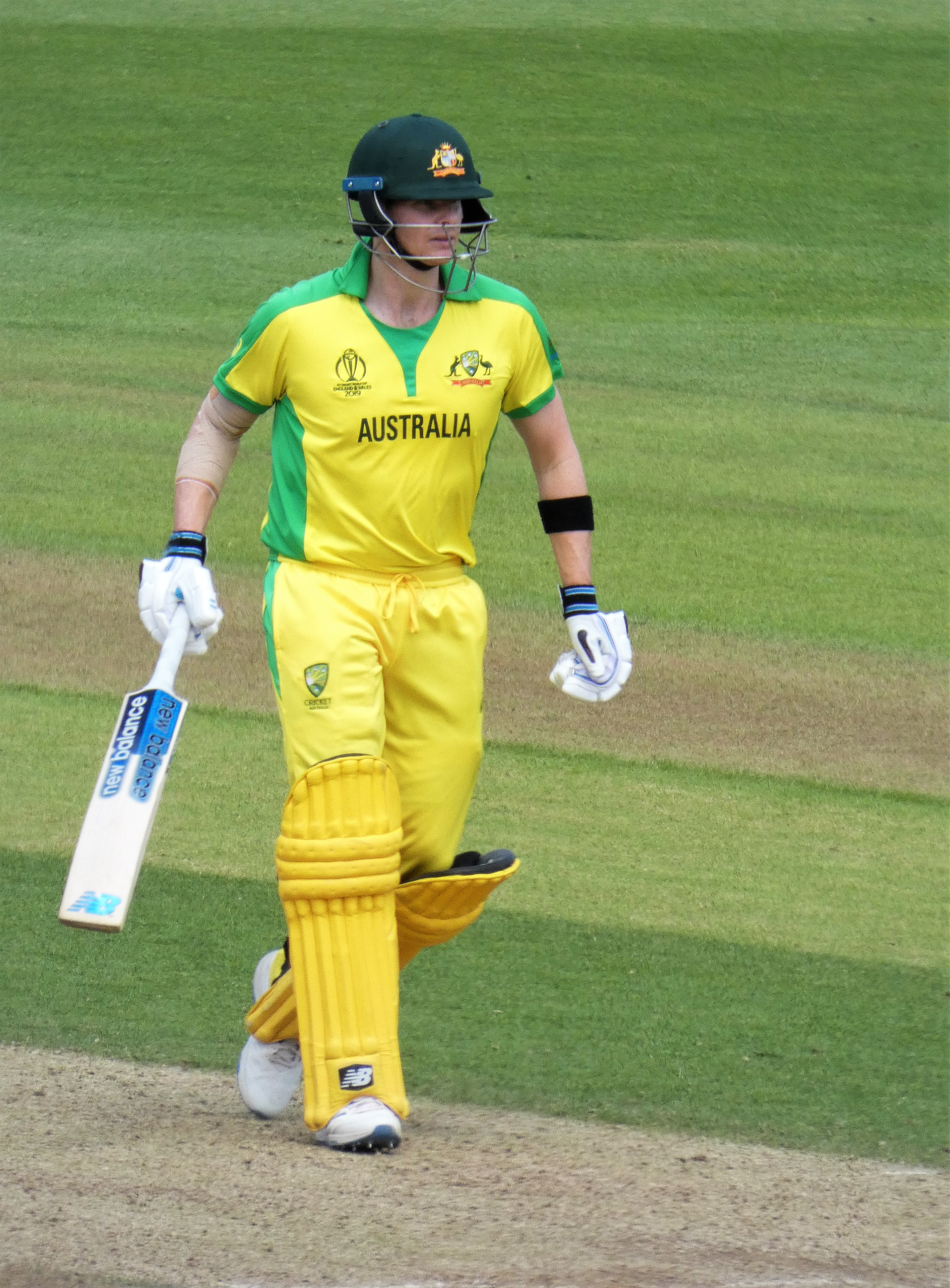
Smith during the 2019 World Cup

In April 2019, he was named in Australia's squad for the 2019 Cricket World Cup. After missing the 2018–19 season, Smith was awarded a national contract by Cricket Australia for the 2019–20 season. On 1 June 2019, Smith played in Australia's opening match of the Cricket World Cup, against Afghanistan, at the County Ground in Bristol. On 11 July 2019, in the semi-final match against England Smith scored 85 runs, becoming the second batsman after Sachin Tendulkar to score four 50+ scores in Cricket World Cup knockouts. In the tournament, he scored 379 runs at an average of 37.90, including four fifties.

==== Ashes in England 2019 ====
In July 2019, he was named in Australia's squad for the 2019 Ashes series in England. In the first Test at Edgbaston, Smith scored centuries in both innings, his ninth and tenth Ashes centuries and his 24th and 25th overall. Smith's first innings hundred was hailed as one of his finest ever by British Media as he was returning from a year-long suspension and was batting with the tail for a large part of his innings under tricky conditions. His 25th came in his 119th innings, second only to Don Bradman (who took 69 innings). Smith also rated his first innings hundred at Edgbaston as his best ever.

In the first innings of the second Test, his innings was interrupted on 80, when he was hit by a 148.7 km/h ball on the left side of his neck, under the ear from Jofra Archer. He later returned to complete his innings after passing the concussion tests and was out, lbw, for 92. On 18 August 2019, the final day of the Test, Smith was replaced by Marnus Labuschagne, after further tests showed he had suffered concussion due to the blow the previous day. Therefore, Labuschagne became the first player to become a concussion substitute in a Test match following a change in the International Cricket Council's (ICC) rules. The concussion then ruled him out of the third Test, though this did not stop him reclaiming the number one position in the Test batting rankings on 3 September 2019.

In the first innings of the fourth Test at Old Trafford, Smith scored 211 from 319 balls, his third double-century in Test matches and his third century in the series. He became the first batsman to score 500 or more runs in three successive Ashes series.

Smith registered his tenth consecutive Ashes fifty-plus score in the first innings of the fifth Test, breaking Inzamam Ul Haq's record for the most consecutive Test 50+ scores against a single opponent. He finished the series with 774 runs at an average of 110.57, by far the most on either team. Smith made 3 hundreds and 3 fifties. He was awarded his second consecutive Compton–Miller Medal as the man of the series.

British Media along with former cricketers rated his dominating batting in the series as one of the greatest batting displays in a test series.

=== 2019–2021: Form slump ===
==== Sri Lanka, Pakistan and New Zealand in Australia 2019–20 ====
After retaining the Ashes in England, the Australian team returned home for two back to back T20I series against Sri Lanka and Pakistan. In the first T20I against Sri Lanka, Smith did not bat, but made 53 not out and 13 in the second and third matches respectively. Australia went on to win the three match series 3–0. Although Smith was not required to bat in the first and third T20Is against Pakistan, his valuable contribution of 80 not out in the second match helped Australia win the match by seven wickets, and go on to win the T20I series 2–0.

Following the T20I series', Australia played Pakistan and New Zealand at home in a two and three match Test series respectively. In contrast to the preceding Ashes tour, Smith made little contribution with the bat throughout the test series against Pakistan, scoring 4 and 36 in the first and second matches respectively. Despite this, Australia went on to win the Test series 2–0, winning both matches by an innings margin. During the second test match of the series at Adelaide, Smith overtook Donald Bradman as the 11th highest run scorer for Australia in tests. Smith also became the fastest test batsman to score 7,000 test runs in his 126th innings, bettering the 73-year-old record of Walter Hammond (130 innings).

In the first day-night Test match at Perth against New Zealand, Smith struggled, scoring 43 and 16, and was dismissed both innings to the short-pitched bowling of fast-bowler Neil Wagner. Australia went on to win the first Test by 296 runs. In the second test at Melbourne, Smith continued to find form when he scored 85 in the first innings before he was again dismissed by Neil Wagner, denying Smith of a record fifth consecutive Test century at the MCG. Although Australia bowled New Zealand out for 148 and progressively built on their large first innings lead, Smith was dismissed for 7 in the second innings, giving Neil Wagner his 200th Test wicket and fourth consecutive dismissal of Smith in the series. Despite this, Australia comfortably won the match by 247 runs and retained the Trans-Tasman Trophy. On Day 1 of the Melbourne test, Smith also went past Greg Chappell's tally of 7,110 moving into 10th position as highest run-scorer for Australia in Tests. The 3rd Test saw Smith reach the half-century mark again, reaching 63 from 182 balls, taking 45 minutes to get off the mark. Australia won the match by 279 runs, completing a clean sweep of the Test series.

In a similar vein to Bodyline devised by England in the 1930s to disrupt Bradman's scoring, which was largely employed by Harold Larwood, New Zealand devised a set of tactics to curb Smith's scoring. It involved left-arm fast-medium bowler Neil Wagner pitching short to Smith attempting to get him out caught on the leg side. The plan enjoyed good results, with Wagner dismissing Smith all four times in Perth and Melbourne, however Colin de Grandhomme claimed Smith's wicket in the Test at Sydney. Smith himself said after the first Test, "The pink one's a little bit different – it just sort of comes off the wicket at different paces ... I couldn't quite time the ball where I wanted to at certain times but no doubt I'm going to get a little bit (of short-pitch bowling) in Melbourne, I dare say, on probably a different wicket. We'll see how we go." Despite Smith scoring 214 runs from 5 innings at an average of 42.80, and atypically for Smith a low strike rate of 34.13—who just three months earlier in the 2019 Ashes scored at a rate of 64.71 per 100 balls—Australia managed to win all three Tests by a margin of over 200 runs, largely thanks to Labuschagne's batting.

==== Tours of India and South Africa 2019–20 ====
Australia travelled to India to play three ODI matches between 14 and 19 January 2020. Smith was not required in the first match. In the second match, Smith came in at 1/20 and looked set to reach another hundred, but was dismissed for 98 as he played on to his stumps off Kuldeep Yadav. In the 3rd match, Smith made 131 off 132 balls as Australia reached a total of 286 from the 50 overs. However, Smith's hundred was in vain as India chased down the target in the 48th over, India winning the series 2–1.

Australia travelled to South Africa to play a 3 ODI matches and 3 T20I matches between 21 February and 7 March 2020. The first match of the T20I series in Johannesburg saw Smith topscore with 45, helping Australia to a total of 196 winning by 107 runs. Australia was sent in to bat in the 3rd match at Cape Town, making 193 runs from their 20 overs, Smith remaining not out on 30 from 15 balls. South Africa was bowled out for 96, Australia winning by 97 runs, and winning the T20I series 2–1.

Smith topscored in the first ODI match with 76, but the rest of the team could only manage 134 between them, getting bowled out in the 46th over for 217. Smith failed to make any significant scores for the remaining games as Australia lost the ODI series 0–3.

==== New Zealand in Australia 2020 ====
New Zealand returned to Australia after the Test series, with games scheduled to be held on 13, 15 and 20 March 2020. The first match was won by Australia, with a winning margin of 71 runs; Smith getting bowled for 14 by Santner. However, due to the COVID-19 pandemic, the 2nd and 3rd matches were cancelled without a ball being bowled due to travel restrictions.

==== Tour of England 2020 ====
On 16 July 2020, Smith was named in a 26-man preliminary squad of players to begin training ahead of a possible tour to England following the COVID-19 pandemic. On 14 August 2020, Cricket Australia confirmed that the fixtures would be taking place, with Smith included in the touring party.

Smith's scoring was unremarkable in the 3 T20I matches. Between the last T20I match and first ODI match, Smith was struck on the head at training, and subsequently missed the first two ODIs. Smith was still feeling the effects before the 3rd ODI, and was left out again, missing all three matches in the series.

==== India in Australia 2020–21 ====
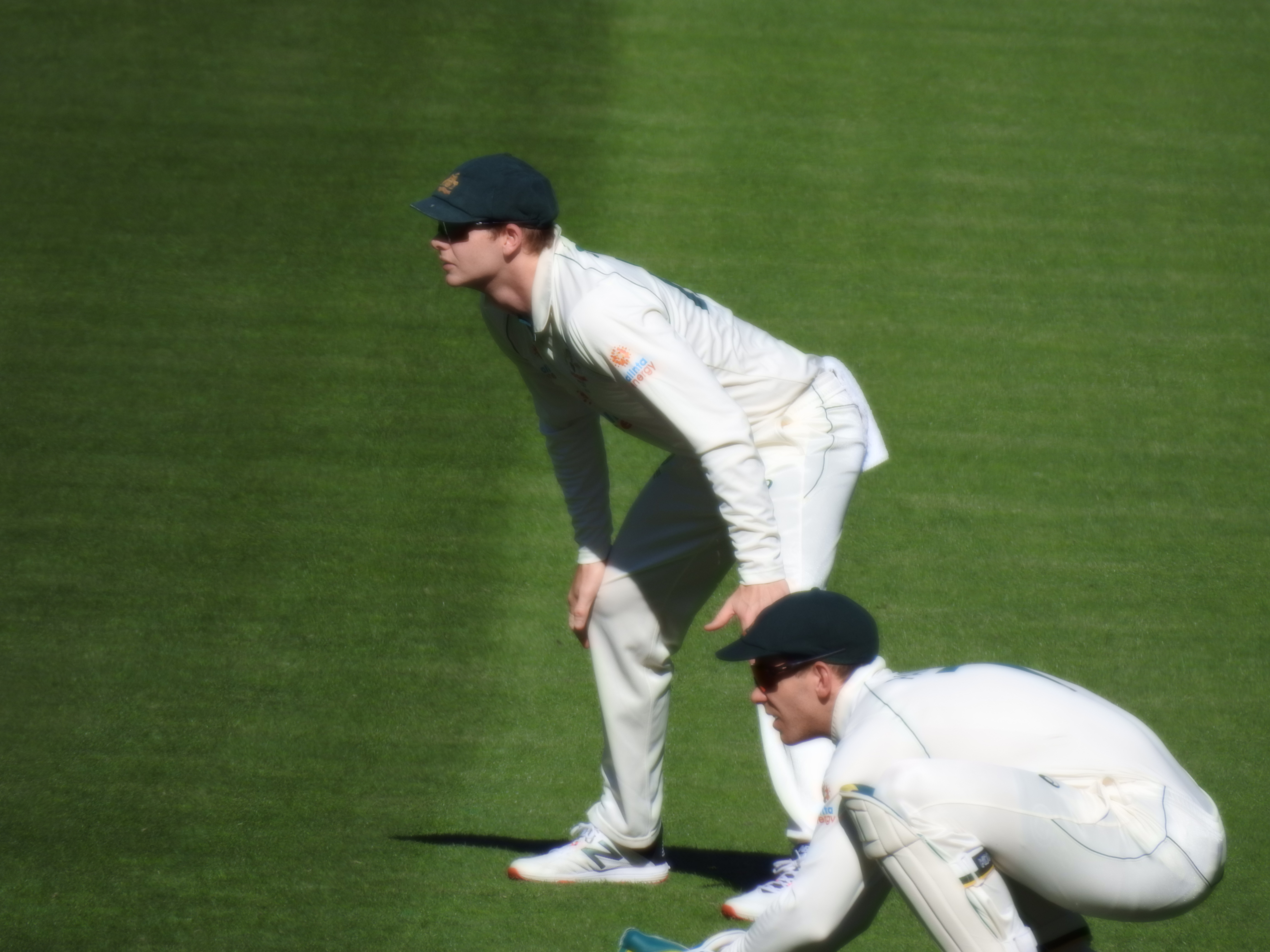
Smith fielding for Australia in 2020

India's tour began with a 3-match ODI series. In the first match in Sydney, Smith came to the wicket after a large opening partnership, and put on a 108-run partnership with Aaron Finch. Smith brought up his hundred off 62 deliveries, the third fastest by an Australian and finished with 105 runs off 66 balls. Smith made a second century in the second match at Sydney, again requiring only 62 deliveries. He was dismissed on 104 from 64 deliveries. Smith and Labuschagne put on a 136-run partnership. Australia won the match by 51 runs, and Smith was again awarded Player of the Match for his performance. Australia won the series 2–1. Smith was awarded Player of the Series for his efforts.

Following the ODI series was a 3-match T20I series. Smith made a respectable 46 in the second match, but his scores in the other matches were unremarkable. Australia lost the series 1–2.

In November 2020, Smith was nominated for the Sir Garfield Sobers Award for ICC Male Cricketer of the Decade, and the award for Test cricketer of the decade.

Smith's poor form for his standards continued as he scored 1 and 1* in the opening Test of the Border–Gavaskar Trophy in Adelaide, Australia winning the match after bowling India out for 36, their lowest total in Tests. Smith scored 0 and 8 at Melbourne as India won by 8 wickets in contrast to his previous seven Tests at the ground where he had averaged 113.50. Since the 2019 Ashes, Smith had averaged 26.40. Ex-Australian captain Ian Chappell noted "He doesn't look as comfortable at the crease because India have given him things to think about" and "In trying to avoid one way of getting out, you can create another one, and I think that's happened a bit with Smith."

Smith was able to break his 14-innings century drought since the 2019 Ashes at his home ground in Sydney with a 226-ball 131 in the first innings. He followed that up with a 167-ball 81 in the third innings, helping to set India a target of 407 in the fourth innings. The match ended in a draw as the series was poised 1 all.

In the fourth and final match of the series at the Gabba, Smith made 36 in the first innings and topscored for Australia with 55 in the third innings. Australia set India a target of 328 to win. India took the game into the 5th day as they chased the target with three wickets remaining as Australia lost the series 1–2.

==== T20 World Cup in United Arab Emirates 2021 ====
Smith was ruled out of the tours to West Indies and Bangladesh with an elbow injury in his left arm — a recurrence of an injury that prohibited him from playing domestic cricket for a month during February and March in 2021. National selection panel chair Trevor Hohns said of the injury – "I can't tell you how long or how serious it is but it's something that he's had before, and it definitely flared up again whilst playing in the IPL ... How long it'll take to get it completely right, I can't tell you that at the moment ... the main thing from our point of view with Steven is to make sure he is fit for the T20 World Cup and of course the Ashes next season." In August 2021, Smith was named in Australia's squad for the 2021 ICC Men's T20 World Cup.

Smith played a "floating position" in Australia's win in the T20 World Cup. He scored 69 runs at a strike rate of 97.18.

=== 2021–2023: Return to Australia captaincy and form ===
==== Ashes in Australia 2021–22 ====
There will be times when I am out in the middle and it is a hot day, and I am in the middle of a spell and I need to turn to people for advice, for experience,

That is the main reason ... I wanted Steve to be vice-captain. So I think how that looks, it potentially could look differently to what you are seeing how partnerships work in the past.

Steve has got such huge strengths, especially around tactics on the field.

I will be leaning on him usually for that, and it might look a little bit different from the outside to potentially how the captains have been in the past, and that is great.

— Pat Cummins on Steve Smith, (ABC, November 2021)

In November 2021, following Paine's resignation from the Test captaincy amid allegations of improper conduct in 2017, Pat Cummins was promoted to captain of the Test team, as Smith returned to a leadership position with the vice captaincy. In the first Test in Brisbane, Smith fell to 'a lazy shot' to Wood for 12.

Smith captained Australia for the second Test in Adelaide, when Cummins was ruled out for the match after he was deemed to be a close contact of someone with COVID-19. Smith passed 50 in the first innings, but was trapped leg before wicket on 93 to James Anderson to a ball that kept low. In the second innings, Smith survived multiple chances (including a first-ball drop by Buttler) but was out on 6, gloved down the leg side to Ollie Robinson. Smith had also picked up his first test wicket in 6 years, dismissing Jack Leach, who was caught by Warner.

After the Test, Smith said "It brought back some old memories in a way and I had fun out there, but it's Patty's team. I'm the vice-captain and I will help him any way I can. That's my job. Hopefully we can keep the momentum going into what should be an amazing Boxing Day Test."

==== Tour of Pakistan 2022 ====
Australia toured Pakistan in 2022 to play three tests, three ODIs and a one off T20I. Smith played during the three tests, but did not play in the ODIs and T20Is. This tour marked Australia's first tour of Pakistan since 1998. Smith performed well, averaging 56.50 in 4 innings and achieving a top score of 78, but did not manage to fully take advantage of the "dead" and "benign" pitch at the Rawalpindi Cricket Stadium during the first test, unlike his Pakistani contemporaries. During the series, Smith had also become the fastest man to reach 8,000 test runs, achieving it in 151 innings, one less than the previous title holder, Kumar Sangakkara and three innings faster than Sachin Tendulkar. Smith was also the first person to achieve this feat with a batting average over 60, reaching 8,000 test runs with a 60.1 average at the time.

==== Tour of Sri Lanka 2022 ====
In 2022, Australia toured Sri Lanka for 3 T20Is, 5 ODIs and 2 tests. Smith did not play during the first T20I, but played in the second and third, where he scored 5 runs in the second match and 37 runs from 27 balls and remained not out in the third match. Smith finished the T20I series with a 42.0 batting average, with a high score of 37. Smith played during the first two ODI matches, but was unable to play during the last three due to a quad injury. He scored 53 runs off 60 balls during the first match and scored 28 runs from 35 balls during the second match. He finished the ODI series with an average of 40.50, a high score of 53 and scored 81 runs in 2 innings.

Smith played during both of the tests, and scored 6 runs from 11 balls before being run out by Niroshan Dickwella. This mix up had caused Smith to lose his temper against his batting partner at the time, Khawaja, where he was visibly irritated. However, Smith stated that there was no lingering fallout between the two of them. Smith did not bat during the second innings, as Australia bowled Sri Lanka out for 212 and 113, and had a target of 5 runs, winning the match by 10 wickets. During the second test, Smith scored 145 runs from 272 balls and remained not out. This was his first century since January 2021; a time span of 547 days, as well as being his 28th Test century. During the second innings however, Smith was dismissed for 0 and Australia collapsed, as Sri Lanka beat Australia by an innings and 39 runs. During the second innings, Smith had reviewed the original "out" decision by the umpire, only to confirm the umpire's decision. This review was called "comical" and "appalling" by multiple news sources. Smith finished the test series with 151 runs from 3 innings, an average of 75.50 and with a high score of 145*. He was the second highest run scorer during the series, behind Sri Lankan Dinesh Chandimal.

==== Zimbabwe, New Zealand in Australia 2022 ====
In August 2022, Smith returned to the ODI team from injury, scoring 48 not out and 47 not out in the first 2 ODIs, Smith was dismissed for 1 run in the 3rd ODI with Zimbabwe winning the match by 3-wickets. Australia won the series 2–1. In September 2022, against New Zealand, in the 1st ODI, Smith was out for 1 run in consecutive innings. Smith returned to form in the 2nd ODI, scoring 61 runs, with 4 of the top 5 failing to reach double-digits in the match. In the 3rd ODI, at Cairns, Smith scored his 12th ODI century. Australia winning the series 3-nil.

==== Tour of India 2022 ====
In September 2022, Smith returned to the No.3 position in the T20I team for the first time since October 2021. Smith scored 35 runs in the 1st T20I in a 4-wicket win. The 2nd T20I was reduced to 8 overs per side due to weather, Smith was shifted to No.6, and was run out for 8 runs in a 6-wicket loss to India. Smith scored 9 runs in the 3rd T20I, with India again winning by 6 wickets and winning the series 2–1.

==== T20 World Cup in Australia 2022 ====
In October 2022, Smith batted No.3 in the warm-up match in Brisbane against India, only scoring 11 from 12 balls. Not selected for the opening match against New Zealand, Smith was only selected for Australia's fifth and final match of the tournament, against Afghanistan, and was dismissed for 4, leg before wicket. Australia failed to reach the finals to defend their 2021 title.

==== England, West Indies, South Africa in Australia 2022–23 ====
In October 2022, Smith was named in the Australian ODI squad for the three-match home ODI series. He scored 195 runs including two half centuries in 3 matches at an average of 97.50 as Australia won the series in a 3–0 whitewash.

In November 2022, he was named in the Australia Test squad for the series against the West Indies.

In the first Test in Perth, Smith scored 200 not out from 311 deliveries, his fourth double-century in his Test career. Smith said after his innings: "I think from the first one-dayer against England, where I sort of implemented the work that I've been doing, it felt really good straightaway." He went on to say "I suppose the reason for my slight change in technique is because I was unhappy with where I was at with my batting ... But I think now with the way I'm able to play and the way teams have bowled against me, I've had to adapt a bit and where I'm at with my body and my hands I feel like I'm opening up the whole ground as opposed to probably just behind square on the leg side, and I'm able to hit the ball in different areas, which I probably was able to hit previously. So I feel in a good place."

In December 2022, Smith was named in Australia's Test squad as the vice-captain for their home series against South Africa. In the third Test, on 5 January 2023, he scored 104 runs and moved past Matthew Hayden and Clarke to become the fourth highest Australian Test run-scorer. This was also his 30th Test century, the equal third most by an Australian.

==== Tour of India 2023 ====
In January 2023, Smith was named in Australia's Test and ODI squads for the tour against India. In February 2023, in the 1st Test at Nagpur, Smith scored 37 and 25 not out, with India winning by an innings and 132 runs. In the 2nd Test at Delhi, Smith was dismissed by Ravi Ashwin in both innings, out for a duck in the 1st innings and just 9 in the 2nd. In March 2023, Smith returned to Test captaincy duties, with Cummins flying home for a family emergency, Smith took the reins in 3rd Test in Indore, Australia winning by 9 wickets. Smith scored 26 in his only innings. In the 4th Test, at Ahmedabad, Smith scored 38 runs in the 1st innings and 10 not out, in a draw. India retaining the trophy 2–1.

In March 2023, Smith returned to ODI captaincy for the first time since 2018, with Cummins still unavailable. Smith struggled to have an impact with the bat during the series. Smith was out for 22 in the 1st ODI in a 5-wicket loss. In the 2nd ODI, Australia cruised to a 10-wicket victory, so Smith didn't bat. In the 3rd ODI, he was out for a 3-ball duck, Australia winning by 21 runs, winning the series 2–1 under Smith's captaincy.

==== ICC World Test Championship Final and The Ashes 2023 ====
In May 2023, Smith was named in Australia's squad for the final, which was set to take place at The Oval on 7 June 2023. During the final, Smith consolidated Australia's position in the first innings with a 285 run partnership with Travis Head, ending the innings scoring 121 runs which marked his 31st century in Test cricket. With his contribution, Australia defeated India in the final by 240 runs, making Smith the first men's cricket player (along with Warner and Mitchell Starc) to win the ICC World Cup, ICC Men's T20 World Cup, and the ICC World Test Championship.

In June 2023, Smith in the 2nd Ashes Test at Lords, equaled Steve Waugh with 32 Test centuries for Australia, only behind Ponting. While fielding in England's 2nd innings, Smith suffered a wrist injury resulting in tendon damage requiring a cortisone injection.

=== 2023–2024: Second form slump ===
==== Tour of South Africa 2023 ====
In August 2023, Smith was ruled out of Australia's white-ball tour of South Africa due to the wrist injury he suffered in the Ashes. Smith was expected to open the batting for Australia for the first time in T20Is following his Big Bash exploits at the top of the order.

==== ODI World Cup in India 2023 ====
In September 2023, Australia played a 3 match ODI series in the lead up to the World Cup against India losing 2–1. Smith scored 41 in the 1st ODI, filled in as captain in the 2nd ODI but was out for a golden duck. He found form in the 3rd ODI scoring 74.

In the World Cup warm up matches, Smith opened the batting and scored 55 against Netherlands but only managed 27 against Pakistan batting No.3.

In October 2023, Smith batted No.3 for Australia's first 3 games but only managed a top score of 46 against India. Against Pakistan opening pair Warner and Marsh both scored centuries so Australia promoted Glenn Maxwell to No.3 with Smith demoted to No.4, Maxwell scored 0 and Smith scored 9. This was the first ODI match that Smith batted anywhere other than No.3 since the 2019 World Cup. In Australia's fifth match, against Netherlands, promoted back to 3, Smith scored his highest score for the tournament with 71.

Against New Zealand, Head returned from injury, which forced Australia into a batting reshuffle. With Marsh in-form opening and Smith yet to find form, Australia decided to move Smith down to No.4 which Smith said shocked him. Smith would only manage a top score of 63 vs Bangladesh in the tournament while batting no.4 with his best score coming when he was batting No.3 against Netherlands.

In November 2023, in the semi final against South Africa, Smith managed the second-highest score for Australia and the fourth-highest in the game with 30 runs in a tight run chase to seal Australia's place in the World Cup Final against India. In the Final, Smith was out for 9 lbw to Jasprit Bumrah, replays later showed it would have been not out had Smith reviewed. Australia went on win led by a Head century. This would be Smith's 2nd ODI World Cup victory.

Following the World Cup, Australia had a 3 match T20I series against India, while several ODI World Cup members rested, Smith stayed on for the first 2 games. Opening the batting for the first time for Australia in T20Is, Smith scored 52 in the 1st, just his 5th half century in the format for Australia but he only scored 19 in the 2nd match before heading home in preparation for the home summer.

==== Pakistan and the West Indies in Australia in 2023–24 ====
In December 2023, in the 1st Test against Pakistan at Perth, Smith was twice dismissed by debutant Khurram Shahzad for 31 and 45 runs. In the 2nd Test, Smith was dismissed for 26 runs in the 1st innings before making 50 runs in his 2nd innings. In the 3rd Test, Smith scored 38 and 4 not out in a 3–0 Australia series victory.

In January 2024, following Warner's Test retirement, Smith was named by Chief Selector George Bailey to open the batting for first time in Test cricket. Smith had success previously opening the batting in the IPL, BBL and for Australia in T20Is and ODI warm up matches. Starting against the West Indies. In the 1st Test against the West Indies at Adelaide, Smith was dismissed by Test debutant Shamar Joseph for just 12 runs in his 1st innings as a Test opener. He scored 11 not out in the 4th innings as Australia chased a moderate total, winning by 10 wickets. In the 2nd Test at Brisbane, Smith was again out cheaply, scoring 6 from 6 before falling lbw to Kemar Roach. The West Indies set Australia 216 to chase in the 4th innings, Smith produced his best Test innings as an opener, scoring a defiant 91 not out in a Shamar Joseph-led 8-run West Indies victory.

In February 2024, Smith again captained Australia to another ODI series victory with a 3-nil thumping over the West Indies. In the 1st ODI, Smith top scored with a fluent 79 at the MCG, batting No.4. In the 2nd ODI, Smith was out for just 5 at the SCG, with Australia still winning by 83 runs. In the 3rd ODI at Canberra, Australia bowled the West Indies out for just 86 runs, Australia started fast and cruised to victory by 8 wickets, Smith was not out for 6 runs. Smith was rested for the T20I series.

==== Tour of New Zealand 2024 ====
In February 2024, Australia toured New Zealand for 3 T20Is and 2 Tests, Smith named in both squads. Smith wasn't selected for the 1st T20I and only managed scores of 11 and 4, opening the batting in the 2nd and 3rd T20I, this left Smith's place in the T20I setup in doubt given Head, Warner and Marsh were likely to form the top order based on comments from George Bailey.

In the 1st Test against New Zealand at Wellington, again opening the batting, Smith spent more than 100 minutes at the crease, scoring 31 before he was dismissed. Cameron Green batting in Smiths usual Test No.4 position, had a career best innings of 174 not out. In Australia's 2nd innings Smith was out for 0 from 3, dismissed by Tim Southee for the first time in Test cricket. In the 2nd Test at Christchurch, Smith could only manage scores of 11 and 9 before being trapped lbw in both innings.

==== T20 World Cup in West Indies and USA 2024 ====
In May 2024, Steve Smith was dropped from Australia's squad for the 2024 ICC Men's T20 World Cup tournament.

==== Tour of England 2024 ====
In September 2024, Australia toured England for 3 T20Is and 5 ODIs. Smith was selected for the ODIs but again wasn't selected for the T20I squad. Smith returned to the No.3 position in the 1st ODI, batting 3 in four of the five games, Smith was below his best only passing 50 once with scores of 32, 4, 60, and 5 in the first four games. Following an injury to Marsh, Smith captained in the final match. Smith reached 36 not out before the run chase was rained out. Australia winning by DLS, winning the series 3–2. Smith finished the series with 137 runs, a strike rate of 80.58 and an average of 34.25 runs for the series.

In October 2024, following an injury to Green, it was reported Smith would shift back to No.4 for the Border–Gavaskar Trophy 2024–25.

In his past 21 Test innings, Smith had passed 50 just three times. From February 2023 to March 2024, Smith averaged just 36.14 with two centuries in 17 Tests.

=== 2024–present: 10,000 Test runs and ODI Retirement ===
==== Pakistan, India in Australia 2024–25 ====
In November 2024, Pakistan toured Australia for 3 ODIs and 3 T20Is, Smith was selected for the ODI series but again was left out of the T20I squad. In the 1st ODI at Melbourne, Smith looked in control in the run chase, scoring 44 from 46 deliveries before holding out to backward point. In the 2nd ODI at Adelaide, Smith top-scored for Australia with 35 runs, Pakistan winning by 9 wickets, levelling the series 1-all. Smith along with other senior Test players were rested for the deciding ODI.

In November 2024, Smith returned to No.4 for the 1st Border–Gavaskar Trophy 2024–25 Test in Perth. Dismissed for just the second golden duck of his Test career in his 1st innings, Smith performed better in his 2nd innings but was out for just 17. In Adelaide, Smith's bad luck continued, strangled down leg-side for just 2 runs from 11 balls. Smith was averaging just 23.20 in Tests in 2024, and on a 24 innings stretch without a century, the longest in his career.

In December 2024, Smith overtook Steve Waugh for 2nd most Test centuries for Australia, scoring his 33rd century in the 3rd Test at the Gabba. In a rain-affected draw, Smith was dismissed for 4 from 5 in Australia's 2nd innings as they tried to up the tempo. In the 4th Test, the Boxing Day Test at the MCG, Smith scored his 34th Test century, 140 runs from 197 balls before a bizarre chop on dismissal looking to up the ante, 8 wickets down. Smith was out caught for 13 from 41 balls in Australia's second dig, Australia winning by 184 runs.

In January 2025, Smith needed 38 runs to join the 10,000 Test runs club at his home ground, the SCG, in the New Years Test. Smith however failed to reach the mark in either innings. He was dismissed for 33 runs in his 1st innings, and 4 runs in his 2nd innings, falling just 1 run short. Australia won the series 3–1, marking their first Test series victory against India since 2014, when Smith was captain.

==== Tour of Sri Lanka 2025 ====
In January 2025, Smith was announced as Australia's Test captain for the Warne-Muralitharan Trophy 2024/25 in Sri Lanka. Smith suffered an injury to his right elbow in the Big Bash while fielding, in the lead up to the tour but was later cleared to join the squad in Dubai for preparation, after consulting a specialist.

In the 1st Test at Galle, Smith as captain, won the toss and elected to bat. He reached 10,000 Test runs by a scoring a single on the first delivery he faced, and went on to score his 35th Test century, his 16th Test century as captain of Australia and his 1st Test century in 14 innings as Test captain since he scored his 23rd Test hundred in the 2017-18 Ashes series. He scored 141 runs from 251 deliveries. Australia made 6–654 before Smith declared, and Australia bowled Sri Lanka all out for 165 runs in their 1st innings. Smith enforced the follow-on during the first session on day four and Australia bowled Sri Lanka all out again during the second session, with Australia winning by an innings and 242 runs.

In February 2025, in the 2nd Test, at the same venue in Galle, Smith broke both fielding and batting records for Australia. He first equalled and then overtook Ponting's record of 196 Test catches for the most catches by an Australian in Test cricket, with 197 catches in 116 Test matches. Then Smith became Australia's leading Test run-scorer in Asia, and also broke the record for most Test centuries in Asia by an Australian, scoring his 36th Test century, his 4th Test century his last five test matches and his 17th Test century as captain of Australia. Australia ended up winning by 9 wickets and winning the series 2-nil, marking Australia's first Test series victory in Sri Lanka since 2011. Smith was named player of the series.

==== Champions Trophy in Pakistan and United Arab Emirates 2025 ====
In January 2025, Smith was named in Australia's 2025 ICC Champions Trophy squad, expected to bat at No.3.

In February 2025, following Cummins withdrawal from the Champions Trophy squad, it was announced Smith would captain the team, after having captained in the last edition of the tournament, the 2017 ICC Champions Trophy. After Australia's loss to India in the Semi Final of the ICC Champions Trophy, Smith announced his retirement from ODI cricket. In his final ODI innings, Smith scored 73 runs from 96 deliveries.

==== ICC World Test Championship Final and Tour of West Indies 2025 ====
In May 2025, Smith was named as Australia test vice-captain for the 2025 ICC World Test Championship final and the tour of West Indies cricket team.

In June 2025, on the first day of the 2025 World Test Championship final v South Africa at Lords, Smith scored his 42nd Test fifty and broke an almost 100-year-old record for most runs (591 runs) by overseas batter at the north London venue, overtaking Australian Warren Bardsley's record of 575 runs. Smith was dismissed caught for 66 runs. During the third day, Smith suffered a compound dislocation of his right little finger. Smith was wearing a helmet while fielding in a very close slips position to the quicks due to the edges not carrying due to the nature of the pitch, when he suffered the injury attempting to take a catch, dropping the catch and immediately leaving the field in pain. Smith was taken to hospital for X-rays and further treatment. Smith avoided surgery for the "gruesome" compound dislocation, with the wound washed and disinfected at hospital, later placed in a splint. South Africa won the final by 5 wickets, with Smith not returning for the final days play.

Smith missed the 1st Test v West Indies at Bridgetown, marking the first Test he had missed since 2019 Ashes, breaking a streak of over 50+ consecutive tests.

In July 2025, Smith returned for the 2nd Test v West Indies, at Grenada. Smith was out for 3 in the 1st innings. Due to his finger injury, he was unable to field in his customary slips position for the quick bowlers, only for the spin bowlers. He fielded predominately at mid on/off. In Australia's 2nd batting innings, Smith scored his 43rd Test fifty, scoring 71 runs from 119 deliveries before falling lbw.

==== Ashes in Australia 2025–26 ====
In October 2025, it was confirmed Smith would captain in at least the 1st Test of the 2025–26 Ashes, with Cummins unavailable due to a back injury.

In December 2025, during the day-night second Ashes Test at The Gabba, Smith lost the toss and England elected to bat first. He took two catches off the bowling of Starc in England's first innings before scoring 61 runs from 85 balls in Australia's reply, dismissed by Will Jacks at deep backward square. In England's second innings, Smith took a further three catches. During Australia's small fourth-innings chase, he had a heated exchange with English fast bowler Archer, reigniting their rivalry from the 2019 series, telling Archer, "You bowl fast when there’s nothing going on, champion," after hitting him for six. Smith subsequently hit the winning runs for the second consecutive Test as Australia won on the fourth day.

During the Third Test of the 2025–26 Ashes, Smith was ruled out with "vertigo-like symptoms", and was replaced by Khawaja for the match.

During the 5th Test in Sydney, Smith scored his 37th Test century and 13th Ashes century with a dominant 138-run innings off 220 balls. During that same innings, he passed Sir Jack Hobbs' record of all-time Ashes runs of 3,636, shifting into second place on the list, only behind Sir Donald Bradman.

During the Ashes, Smith would captain Australia for the 4 out of the 5 Tests of the 2025–26 Ashes, with Cummins unavailable due to injury/recovery. Cummins returned to captain the 3rd before being ruled out the rest of the series because of said injury.

== Playing style ==
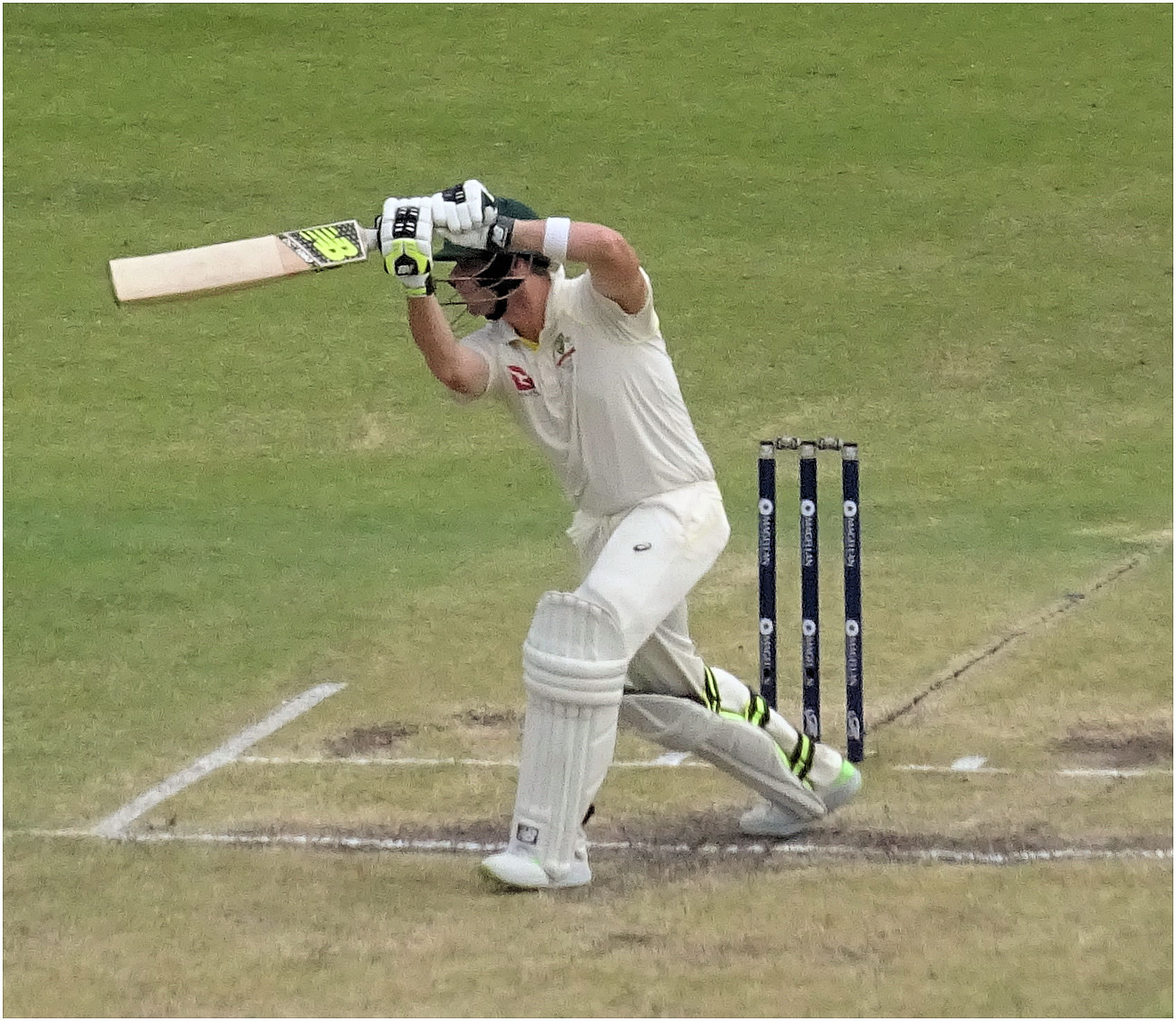
Smith in 2017

Smith is a right-handed batsman with a technique that has been compared to Don Bradman and has attracted attention for its unorthodoxy. Smith is considered to be a fidgety batter whose mannerisms and idiosyncrasies have gained global attention. He moves around frequently in the crease, especially during bowlers' run-up, and ends up with the toes of his feet outside off stump against right-handers, controls the bat with his bottom hand (that is, the hand closest to the blade of the bat), and is capable of playing unconventional cricket shots like the reverse sweep. Playing in a club match in January 2010, right-handed Smith took guard left-handed and hit a six. Due to his unorthodox style, Smith was initially labelled as a limited-overs batsman who might struggle in the longer form of the game, especially early in his career when he was vulnerable outside off stump. However, Smith compensates for his unique technique with outstanding hand-eye co-ordination, focus, and his footwork, especially to spin bowlers, is exemplary. Smith spontaneously experimented with his technique during the Perth Test match in the 2013–14 Ashes, during which he decided to take a "prelim movement back and across" to counter short-pitched bowling. This change took his batting average from 33 in 2013 to 64.95 in 2019. As of 2024, it is 58.01. At the time of delivery, Smith's stumps are fully covered, making bowled dismissals unlikely. This position also allows him to play to either the on or off side with ease.

Much of the credit for Smith's success can also be attributed to batting coach Trent Woodhill, who coached Smith as a junior and noted his abundant talent. He has also defended Smith's unique batting style, and has long argued that in Australia, many naturally talented cricketers who may not necessarily have an orthodox technique are let down by over-coaching; in the years between leaving school and his elevation into international cricket, Smith had his technique picked apart by a number of well-intentioned coaches. Since re-establishing his working relationship with Woodhill, Smith appears to have regained calm and confidence in his cricket, which has since produced results over the last few seasons. Smith is also known for his concentration, being able to bat for long periods of time, even through a whole day's play.

As a bowler, however, after his quick rise up the batting order (until he became captain, and settled in at 4), the comparisons to Shane Warne never gathered momentum. He was an able option as a leg spinner early in his career, but was under-used because he was described as a very defensive bowler.

As a fielder, Smith is regarded as one of the best slip fielders ever to play cricket. He holds the record for the most catches in Tests by any Australian and is fastest player to take 300 catches in the history of international cricket. For catch rate per Test inning, he ranks second to Bob Simpson, and ranks first for players with over 110 catches. Smith has also displayed excellent ground fielding skills, capable of producing sharp run-outs as well as athletic outfield catches and boundary saves.

When he was captain for Australia, he had been initially tagged as the second "Captain Grumpy" since Allan Border early in his captaincy reign, having to warn Mitchell Starc for unsportsmanlike behaviour, and being highly critical of the team's bowling and fielding despite beating New Zealand by over 200 runs in 2015. Later, in 2017–2018, he publicly criticised Glenn Maxwell's training regimen when Maxwell was dropped from the Australian ODI squad. He was also criticised for having too much influence over team selections.

Smith is consistently rated as one of the top-ranked Test batsmen in the world, according to the ICC Player Rankings.

== Career best performances ==
Centuries against different nations
	Test	ODI	T20I	Total	Home	Away	Neutral
England	13	1	–	14	7	7	–
India	11	5	–	16	11	4	1
New Zealand	2	2	–	4	3	1	–
Pakistan	2	2	–	4	3	–	1
South Africa	2	2	–	4	2	2	–
Sri Lanka	4	–	–	4	–	4	–
West Indies	3	–	–	3	2	1	–
Total	37	12	-	49	28	19	2

As of April 2025, Smith has made a total of 54 first-class centuries, 15 List A centuries and 5 T20 centuries. Of these, 37 of his first-class centuries were scored in Test matches and 12 of his List A centuries scored in One Day Internationals. His best bowling figures of seven wickets for the cost of 64 runs (7/64) were taken for New South Wales against South Australia in the Sheffield Shield.

- Smith's highest score in Test and first-class cricket is 239 scored against England at the WACA Ground, Perth in 2017.
- His highest score in ODI and List A cricket is 164 scored against New Zealand at the Sydney Cricket Ground in 2016.
- His highest score in Twenty20 International matches is 90 runs, scored against England at Sophia Gardens, Cardiff in 2015.
- He has scored five T20 centuries. One in the IPL and four in the BBL. The first was for Rising Pune Supergiants against Gujarat Lions at Maharashtra Cricket Association Stadium, Pune in the 2016 Indian Premier League, the second was when he scored 101 off 56 balls against the Adelaide Strikers for the Sydney Sixers at C.ex Coffs International Stadium, the third against the Sydney Thunder for the Sydney Sixers at the SCG in the 2022–23 Big Bash League season, where he scored 125 off 66 balls, the fourth against the Perth Scorchers for the Sydney Sixers at the scg in the 2024-25 Big Bash League season, where he scored 121 off 64 balls and the fifth against the Sydney Thunder for the Sydney Sixers at the scg in the 2025-26 Big Bash League season, where he scored 100 off 42 balls.

=== Test match performance ===
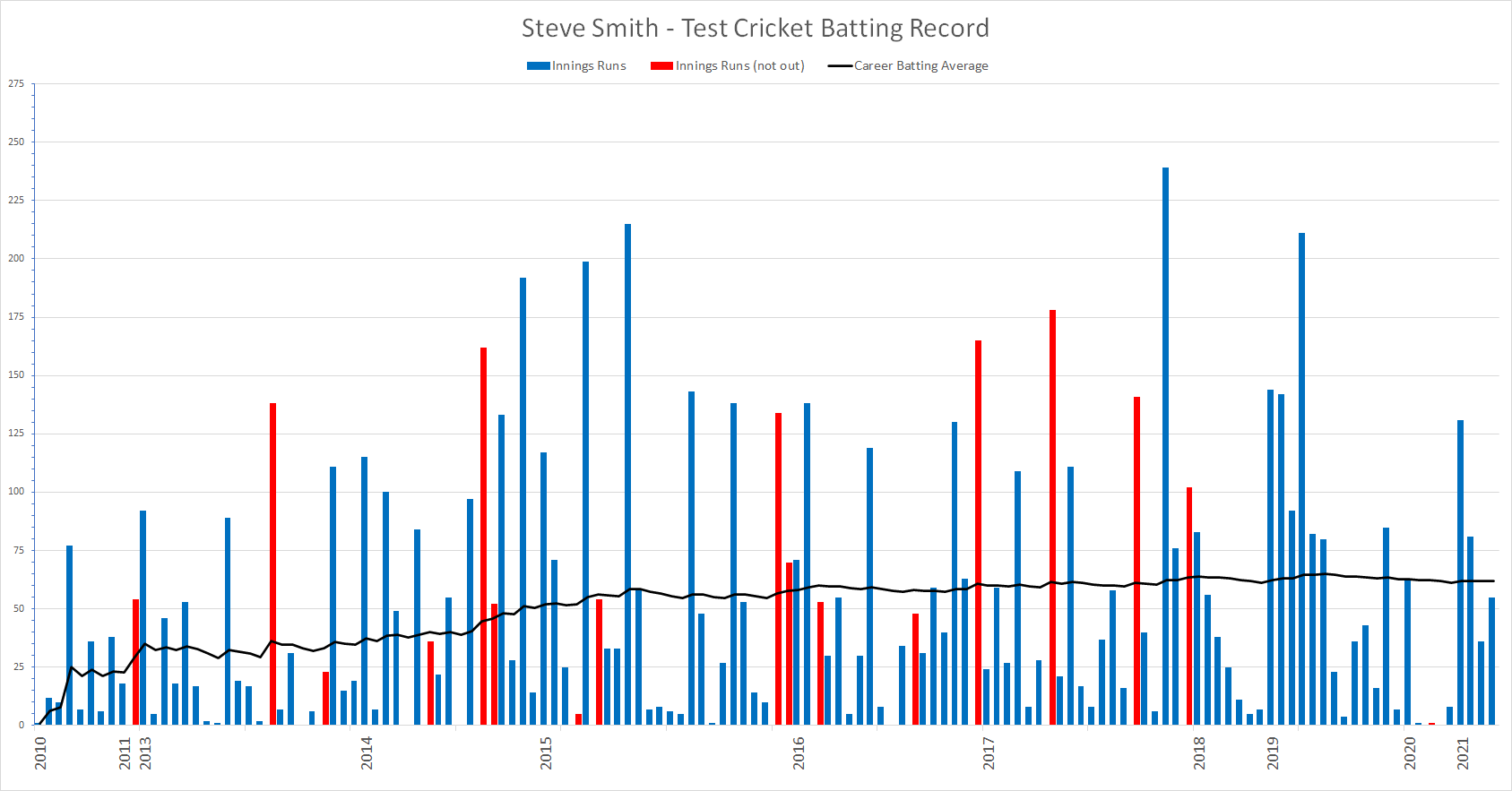
Graphical representation of Smith's test cricket record (as of January 2021). Individual innings are represented by the blue and red (not out) bars; the black line is his career batting average.

== Records and achievements ==
=== Runs ===
- Joint second-fastest batsman (after Don Bradman), youngest Australian and fourth youngest overall to reach 6,000 runs in Tests.
- Fastest batsman to reach 7,000 and 8,000 runs in Tests.
- Second-fastest batsman (after Kumar Sangakkara), fourth Australian overall to reach 9,000 runs in Test cricket.
- Fastest Australian batsman and sixth-fastest batsman in the world to reach 10,000 runs in International cricket.
- Fastest Australian batsman to reach 14,000 runs in International cricket.

==== Run feats ====
- Second batsman to score more than 1,000 runs in Test cricket in four consecutive calendar years.
- First batsman to register ten successive scores of 50 or more against a single opponent in Test history.
- Least number of innings to reach 32 centuries in Test cricket, with 174 innings.
- First player to score a century in the Big Bash League for the Sydney Sixers. Smith scored 101 runs of 56 deliveries at C.ex Coffs International Stadium in Coffs Harbour, New South Wales against the Adelaide Strikers in their 59 run win. He was also named Man of the Match.

=== World Cup ===
- Joint most consecutive 50+ scores in World Cup history with five such scores in the 2015 Cricket World Cup.
- Joint most 50+ scores (four) in Cricket World Cup knockout matches.

=== Fielding ===
- During the 2018 Australian tour to South Africa, he equalled the world record by taking five catches as a non-wicketkeeper in a Test innings and was the 11th fielder to achieve this feat.
- Fastest player to take 300 catches in the history of international cricket and second-best ever catch rate per Test inning for players with over 70 catches.
- Most catches by an Australian in Test cricket.

=== Domestic Captaincy ===
Team	Span	M	Won	Lost	Tied	Draw	NR	W–L%	Titles
Sydney Sixers	2011–14	11	8	2	1	0	0	72.72	1
Pune Warriors India	2012	1	0	1	0	0	0	0	0
New South Wales (One-Day Cup)	2013–15	13	10	3	0	0	0	76.92	2
New South Wales (Sheffield Shield)	2014–25	9	6	2	0	1	0	66.66	1
Rajasthan Royals	2014–20	27	15	11	0	0	1	55.55	0
Rising Pune Supergiant	2017	15	10	5	0	0	0	66.66	0
Comilla Victorians	2019	2	1	1	0	0	0	50.00	0
Washington Freedom	2024–26	22	15	6	0	0	1	68.18	1

=== Ratings ===
- The second-highest Test batting rating (947), behind Don Bradman's 961, reached on 30 December 2017.
- Only player to win the ICC Test Player of the Year award more than once.
- Second youngest batsman to top the ICC Test batting rankings.

=== Awards ===
- Youngest player to win the Sir Garfield Sobers Trophy (ICC Cricketer of the Year award)
- Fastest batsman after Donald Bradman (68 Innings) to reach 25 test centuries (119 Innings).
- Fifth player to win the Allan Border Medal more than once.
- First cricketer to win the McGilvray Medal four times.
- Named as the inaugural ICC Test cricketer of the decade, for the 2010s.
- Third player to win the Allan Border Medal four times, a record alongside former captains Ricky Ponting and Michael Clarke.

== Honours ==
=== Team ===
Sydney Sixers

- Big Bash League: 2011–12, 2019–20
- Champions League Twenty20: 2012

Comilla Victorians

- Bangladesh Premier League: 2019

Washington Freedom

- Major League Cricket: 2024

=== Sporting Honours ===
- Sir Garfield Sobers Trophy (ICC Cricketer of the Year): 2015
- ICC Test Cricketer of the Year: 2015, 2017
- ICC Men's Test Cricketer of the Decade: 2011–2020
- ICC Men's Test Team of the Decade: 2011–2020
- ICC Test Team of the Year: 2015, 2016 (12th man), 2017, 2019
- ICC ODI Team of the Year: 2015
- Allan Border Medal: 2015, 2018, 2021, 2023
- Australian Test Player of the Year: 2015, 2018
- Australian One Day International Player of the Year: 2015, 2021
- Compton–Miller Medal: 2017–18, 2019
- McGilvray Medal: 2014, 2015, 2016, 2017
- Steve Waugh Award: 2009–10, 2011–12
- Wisden Cricketer of the Year: 2016

== In popular culture ==
The Test, a 2020 Australian English-language TV documentary, produced as an Original for Amazon Prime Video. The documentary was also co-produced by Cricket Australia. The documentary revolves around the Infamous ball-tampering scandal at Cape Town in March 2018 and how Australia rebuilt their reputation after the scandal. Smith's redemption and his dominating batting display in the 2019 Ashes after the scandal was one of the key point of the series.

== See also ==
- List of cricketers by number of international centuries scored
- List of cricketers who have scored centuries in both innings of a Test match

== Publications ==
- Smith, Steve (2017). The Journey: My story, from backyard cricket to Australian Captain. Australia: Allen & Unwin. ISBN 9781760639754.

Awards
Preceded by Mitchell Johnson	Sir Garfield Sobers Trophy; 2015	Succeeded by Ravichandran Ashwin
Preceded by Mitchell Johnson	ICC Men's Test Cricketer of the Year; 2015	Succeeded by Ravichandran Ashwin
Preceded by Ravichandran Ashwin	ICC Men's Test Cricketer of the Year; 2017	Succeeded by Virat Kohli
Preceded by Mitchell Johnson	Allan Border Medal; 2015	Succeeded by David Warner
Preceded by David Warner	Allan Border Medal; 2018	Succeeded by Pat Cummins
Preceded by David Warner	Allan Border Medal; 2021	Succeeded by Mitchell Starc
Preceded by Mitchell Starc	Allan Border Medal; 2023	Succeeded by Mitchell Marsh
