= McGilvray Medal =

The McGilvray Medal is an annual award given by ABC Radio to a player chosen by the commentators. It is awarded at the beginning of the calendar year to honour the player's achievements of the preceding year in Test cricket. It is sometimes referred to as the ABC Test Cricketer of the Year. Awarded since 1997, the medal is named for Alan McGilvray, a former cricketer and long-serving veteran cricket commentator, and is usually presented by his surviving family members. Prior to the 2002 Year Award, it was awarded annually to honour four leading Australian players, the best domestic performer and Australia's top female cricketer.

== Winners ==
Year	Recipient/s	Achievement	Notes
1997			
1998	Ricky Ponting Mark Taylor Shane Warne Mark Waugh Colin Miller (best domestic performer) Belinda Clark (best female cricketer)	In addition to her third consecutive medal win, Clark was also named Australia's inaugural Wisden Australian Cricketer of the Year	
1999			
2000			
2001			
2002	Matthew Hayden	Scored 1160 runs at and average of 72.50, including 6 centuries and 3 half-centuries.	
2003	Ricky Ponting	Scored 1503 runs at an average of more than 100 including 6 centuries	
2004	Damien Martyn	Scored 1353 runs at an average of 56.37 with 6 centuries and 5 half-centuries	
2005	Shane Warne	Claimed a record breaking 96 wickets at 22.02 including 40 wickets at 19.92 during the Ashes	
2006	Ricky Ponting	Captained the Australian cricket team to 10 consecutive test wins in the calendar year; amassing 1,333 runs at an average of 88.86	
2007	Brett Lee	Claimed 28 wickets at an average of 17.29 in only four Tests	
2008	Mitchell Johnson	Took 63 wickets in 14 Tests at an average of 29.01, in addition to making 360 runs at 22.5 with the bat	
2009	Mitchell Johnson	Took 63 Test wickets and scored 500 runs in 2009, including his maiden Test century in Cape Town against South Africa.	
2010	Shane Watson	Scored 897 runs at 42.71 in 11 Tests, including one century and eight fifties. He also performed with the ball, taking 19 wickets at 27.05 including 5 for 50 at Lord's and 6 for 33 at Leeds against Pakistan.	
2011	Michael Clarke	Scoring three Test centuries and 618 runs	
2012	Michael Clarke	Scored 1,595 Test runs at an average of 106.	
2013	Michael Clarke	Clarke scored 1093 Test runs at an average of 47.52, including four hundreds, one against India and three against England.	
2014	Steve Smith	Smith scored 1,146 Test runs at an average of 81.85 including five centuries. He also took five wickets, several outstanding catches and captained the team in two Tests taking over from the injured Michael Clarke.	
2015	Steve Smith	Smith scored 1,474 runs, including five centuries and a double ton, at an average of 73.70 across 13 Tests	
2016	Steve Smith	Scored 1,079 runs in the 2016 calendar year and making four centuries averaging 71.93 across 11 Tests	
2017	Steve Smith	Scored 1,305 runs averaging 76.8 with five centuries and one double century. First cricketer to win the award four times.	
2018	Pat Cummins	Took 44 test wickets at 19.98 and scored 251 runs at 17.93.	
2019	Pat Cummins	Took 59 wickets at an average of 20.14	
2020	No winner awarded	On The Final Word Cricket Podcast, Jim Maxwell announced that the McGilvray Medal would not be awarded for the 2020 year, due to restrictions in the amount of Test cricket played as a result of the COVID-19 pandemic.	
2021	Marnus Labuschagne	Scored 526 runs in 2021 at an average of 65.75	
2022	Usman Khawaja	Scored 1080 runs in 2022 at an average of 67.5	
2023	Usman Khawaja	Scored 1210 runs in 2023 at an average of 52.6	
