= Australian cricket team in England in 2013 =

	England	Australia
- Dates: 26 June 2013 – 16 September 2013
Captains	Alastair Cook (Tests); Eoin Morgan (ODIs); Stuart Broad (T20Is)	Michael Clarke (Tests & ODIs); George Bailey (T20Is)

Test series
- Result: England won the 5-match series 3–0
Most runs	Ian Bell (562)	Shane Watson (418)
Most wickets	Graeme Swann (26)	Ryan Harris (24)
- Player of the series: Ian Bell (Eng) (Compton–Miller medal); Ryan Harris (Aus)

One Day International series
- Results: Australia won the 5-match series 2–1
Most runs	Jos Buttler (182)	Michael Clarke (202)
Most wickets	Ben Stokes (6)	Clint McKay (7)
- Player of the series: Michael Clarke (Aus)

Twenty20 International series
- Results: 2-match series drawn 1–1
Most runs	Alex Hales (102)	Aaron Finch (161)
Most wickets	Jade Dernbach (6)	Fawad Ahmed (3); James Faulkner (3)

The Australia National Cricket Team were in England from June to September 2013 for a tour that consisted of five test matches, five One Day International matches and two Twenty20 International matches. The Test series was for The Ashes.

== Squads ==
Tests		ODIs		T20Is	
England	Australia	England	Australia	England	Australia
Alastair Cook (c); James Anderson; Jonny Bairstow; Ian Bell; Tim Bresnan; Stuart Broad; Steven Finn; Simon Kerrigan; Graham Onions; Monty Panesar^{†}; Kevin Pietersen; Matt Prior (wk); Joe Root; Graeme Swann; James Taylor^{†}; Chris Tremlett^{†}; Jonathan Trott; Chris Woakes	Michael Clarke (c); Brad Haddin (vc & wk); Ashton Agar^{†}; Jackson Bird; Ed Cowan; James Faulkner; Ryan Harris; Phillip Hughes; Usman Khawaja; Nathan Lyon; James Pattinson; Chris Rogers; Peter Siddle; Steve Smith^{†}; Mitchell Starc; Matthew Wade (wk); David Warner; Shane Watson	Eoin Morgan (c); Ravi Bopara; Jos Buttler; Michael Carberry; Steven Finn; Chris Jordan; Jamie Overton; Kevin Pietersen; Boyd Rankin; Joe Root; Ben Stokes; James Tredwell; Jonathan Trott; Luke Wright	Michael Clarke (c); Fawad Ahmed; George Bailey; Nathan Coulter-Nile; James Faulkner; Aaron Finch; Josh Hazlewood; Phillip Hughes; Mitchell Johnson; Shaun Marsh; Glenn Maxwell; Clint McKay; Adam Voges; Matthew Wade; Shane Watson	Stuart Broad (c); Ravi Bopara; Danny Briggs; Jos Buttler; Michael Carberry; Jade Dernbach; Steven Finn; Alex Hales; Michael Lumb; Eoin Morgan; Boyd Rankin; Joe Root; James Tredwell; Luke Wright	George Bailey (c); Fawad Ahmed; Michael Clarke; Nathan Coulter-Nile; James Faulkner; Aaron Finch; Josh Hazlewood; Phillip Hughes; Mitchell Johnson; Shaun Marsh; Glenn Maxwell; Clint McKay; Steve Smith; Mitchell Starc; Adam Voges; Matthew Wade (wk); David Warner; Shane Watson

^{†} Late addition to the squad

== ICC Champions Trophy ==
The tour started in June with the 2013 ICC Champions Trophy, in which Australia were drawn in Group A with England, New Zealand and Sri Lanka. They lost to England and Sri Lanka, and the game against New Zealand was washed out, leaving Australia at the bottom of Group A with 1 point and eliminated from the tournament.

== Tour matches ==
=== First-class: Somerset v Australians ===
26–29 June 2013
Scorecard

Somerset	v	Australians
320 (86.1 overs); Chris Jones 130 (239); Mitchell Starc 4/33 (16.1 overs)		321/5d (75.1 overs); Shane Watson 90 (94); Craig Meschede 2/67 (17 overs)
260 (68 overs); James Hildreth 75 (95); James Pattinson 3/61 (13 overs)		263/4 (63.5 overs); Usman Khawaja 73 (116); George Dockrell 3/78 (21.5 overs)

Australians won by 6 wickets
County Ground, Taunton
Umpires: Mark Eggleston (Eng) and David Millns (Eng)

- Somerset won the toss and elected to bat.

=== First-class: Worcestershire v Australians ===
2–5 July 2013
Scorecard

Australians	v	Worcestershire
396/4d (97.3 overs); Shane Watson 109 (111); Jack Shantry 1/71 (18 overs)		284 (92.1 overs); Nick Compton 79 (181); Jackson Bird 4/48 (25 overs)
344/5d (55 overs); Michael Clarke 124 (98); Jack Shantry 2/62 (13 overs)		274/5 (96 overs); Tom Fell 62* (121); James Faulkner 2/21 (17 overs)

Match drawn
New Road, Worcester
Umpires: Ismail Dawood (Eng) and Peter Hartley (Eng)

- Australians won the toss and elected to bat.

=== First-class: Sussex v Australians ===
26–28 July 2013
Scorecard

Australians	v	Sussex
366/5d (94.4 overs); Steve Smith 102* (165); Monty Panesar 3/70 (24.4 overs)		368/7 (100 overs); James Taylor 121* (253); Mitchell Starc 2/43 (18 overs)
152/2d (44 overs); Ed Cowan 77* (110); Lewis Hatchett 2/28 (11 overs)

Match drawn
County Ground, Hove
Umpires: Jeff Evans (Eng) and George Sharp (Eng)

- Australians won the toss and elected to bat.
- Ashton Turner (Aus) and Callum Jackson (Sssx) made their first-class debuts.
- Each innings had a maximum length of 100 overs.

=== Two-day: England Lions v Australians ===
16–17 August 2013
Scorecard

England Lions	v	Australians
269/7d (77 overs); Gary Ballance 104 (154); Nathan Lyon 3/80 (25 overs)		227/6 (68 overs); Shane Watson 45 (44); Ben Stokes 2/27 (13 overs)

Match drawn
County Ground, Northampton
Umpires: Benjamin Debenham (Eng) and George Sharp (Eng)

- England Lions won the toss and elected to bat.
- Rain and bad light reduced play on day 2.

== Test series ==
=== First Test ===
10–14 July 2013
Scorecard

England	v	Australia
215 (59 overs); Jonathan Trott 48 (80); Peter Siddle 5/50 (14 overs)		280 (64.5 overs); Ashton Agar 98 (101); James Anderson 5/85 (24 overs)
375 (149.5 overs); Ian Bell 109 (267); Mitchell Starc 3/81 (32 overs)		296 (110.5 overs); Brad Haddin 71 (147); James Anderson 5/73 (31.5 overs)

England won by 14 runs
Trent Bridge, Nottingham
Umpires: Aleem Dar (Pak) and Kumar Dharmasena (SL)
Player of the match: James Anderson (Eng)

- England won the toss and elected to bat.
- Ashton Agar (Aus) made his Test debut.
- Agar's score of 98 set the Test record for the most runs in an innings by a number 11 batsman and by a number 11 on debut.
- The 163-run partnership between Agar and Phillip Hughes was the highest 10th-wicket partnership in Test history.

=== Second Test ===
18–22 July 2013
Scorecard

England	v	Australia
361 (100.1 overs); Ian Bell 109 (211); Ryan Harris 5/72 (26 overs)		128 (53.3 overs); Shane Watson 30 (42); Graeme Swann 5/44 (21.3 overs)
349/7d (114.1 overs); Joe Root 180 (338); Peter Siddle 3/65 (21 overs)		235 (90.3 overs); Usman Khawaja 54 (133); Graeme Swann 4/78 (30.3 overs)

England won by 347 runs
Lord's, London
Umpires: Kumar Dharmasena (SL) and Marais Erasmus (SA)
Player of the match: Joe Root (Eng)

- England won the toss and elected to bat.
- Ian Bell became the fourth English batsman to score a century in three successive Ashes matches.

=== Third Test ===
1–5 August 2013
Scorecard

Australia	v	England
527/7d (146 overs); Michael Clarke 187 (314); Graeme Swann 5/159 (43 overs)		368 (139.3 overs); Kevin Pietersen 113 (206); Mitchell Starc 3/76 (27 overs)
172/7d (36 overs); David Warner 41 (57); Tim Bresnan 2/25 (6 overs)		37/3 (20.3 overs); Joe Root 13 (57); Ryan Harris 2/13 (7 overs)

Match drawn
Old Trafford, Manchester
Umpires: Marais Erasmus (SA) and Tony Hill (NZ)
Player of the match: Michael Clarke (Aus)

- Australia won the toss and elected to bat.
- Rain and bad light on day 4 reduced play to 56 overs.
- Rain on day 5 meant only 20.3 overs could be bowled and play was abandoned at 16:40.

=== Fourth Test ===
9–13 August 2013
Scorecard

England	v	Australia
238 (92 overs); Alastair Cook 51 (164); Nathan Lyon 4/42 (20 overs)		270 (89.3 overs); Chris Rogers 110 (250); Stuart Broad 5/71 (24.3 overs)
330 (95.1 overs); Ian Bell 113 (210); Ryan Harris 7/113 (28 overs)		224 (68.3 overs); David Warner 71 (113); Stuart Broad 6/50 (18.3 overs)

England won by 74 runs
Riverside Ground, Chester-le-Street
Umpires: Aleem Dar (Pak) and Tony Hill (NZ)
Player of the match: Stuart Broad (Eng)

- England won the toss and elected to bat.

=== Fifth Test ===
21–25 August 2013
Scorecard

Australia	v	England
492/9d (128.5 overs); Shane Watson 176 (247); James Anderson 4/95 (29.5 overs)		377 (144.4 overs); Joe Root 68 (184); James Faulkner 4/51 (19.4 overs)
111/6d (23 overs); Michael Clarke 28 (28); Stuart Broad 4/43 (10 overs)		206/5 (40 overs); Kevin Pietersen 62 (55); Ryan Harris 2/21 (5 overs)

Match drawn
The Oval, London
Umpires: Aleem Dar (Pak) and Kumar Dharmasena (SL)
Player of the match: Shane Watson (Aus)

- Australia won the toss and elected to bat.
- Rain delayed the start of day 2.
- No play on day 4 due to rain.
- Play was brought to a close with four overs left to play on day 5 due to bad light.
- Simon Kerrigan, Chris Woakes (both Eng) and James Faulkner (Aus) made their Test debuts.
- The 447 runs scored on day 5 set a record for the most runs scored on the final day of an Ashes Test.

== T20I series ==
=== 1st T20I ===
29 August 2013
18:30 (D/N)
Scorecard

Australia; 248/6 (20 overs)	v	England; 209/6 (20 overs)
Aaron Finch 156 (63); Jade Dernbach 3/34 (4 overs)		Joe Root 90* (49); Mitchell Johnson 2/41 (4 overs)

Australia won by 39 runs
Rose Bowl, Southampton
Umpires: Rob Bailey (Eng) and Tim Robinson (Eng)
Player of the match: Aaron Finch (Aus)

- England won the toss and elected to field.
- Fawad Ahmed (Aus) made his T20I debut.
- Aaron Finch recorded the highest score in a T20I innings.

=== 2nd T20I ===
31 August 2013
14:30
Scorecard

England; 195/5 (20 overs)	v	Australia; 168/9 (20 overs)
Alex Hales 94 (61); Fawad Ahmed 3/25 (4 overs)		David Warner 53 (42); Jade Dernbach 3/23 (4 overs)

England won by 27 runs
Riverside Ground, Chester-le-Street
Umpires: Rob Bailey (Eng) and Michael Gough (Eng)
Player of the match: Alex Hales (Eng)

- Australia won the toss and elected to field.

== ODI series ==
=== 1st ODI ===
6 September 2013
10:15
Scorecard

England	v	Australia

Match abandoned without a ball bowled
Headingley, Leeds
Umpires: Aleem Dar (Pak) and Richard Illingworth (Eng)

- Rain prevented any play.

=== 2nd ODI ===
8 September 2013
10:15
Scorecard

Australia; 315/7 (50 overs)	v	England; 227 (44.2 overs)
Michael Clarke 105 (102); Boyd Rankin 2/49 (10 overs)		Jos Buttler 75 (65); Clint McKay 3/47 (9.2 overs)

Australia won by 88 runs
Old Trafford, Manchester
Umpires: Richard Kettleborough (Eng) and Sundaram Ravi (Ind)
Player of the match: Michael Clarke (Aus)

- England won the toss and elected to field.

=== 3rd ODI ===
11 September 2013
14:00 (D/N)
Scorecard

England; 59/3 (15.1 overs)	v	Australia
Jonathan Trott 28* (41); Adam Voges 1/3 (1.1 overs)

No result
Edgbaston, Birmingham
Umpires: Aleem Dar (Pak) and Michael Gough (Eng)

- Australia won the toss and elected to field.
- Rain stopped play at 15:35 and the match was abandoned at 19:05.

=== 4th ODI ===
14 September 2013
10:15
Scorecard

Australia; 227 (48.2 overs)	v	England; 231/7 (49.3 overs)
George Bailey 87 (91); James Tredwell 3/53 (8.2 overs)		Jos Buttler 65* (48); Clint McKay 4/39 (10 overs)

England won by 3 wickets
Sophia Gardens, Cardiff
Umpires: Rob Bailey (Eng) and Sundaram Ravi (Ind)
Player of the match: Jos Buttler (Eng)

- England won the toss and elected to field.
- Nathan Coulter-Nile (Aus) made his ODI debut.
- Clint McKay (Aus) took a hat-trick with the wickets of Kevin Pietersen, Jonathan Trott and Joe Root.

=== 5th ODI ===
16 September 2013
14:00 (D/N)
Scorecard

Australia; 298 (49.1 overs)	v	England; 249 (48 overs)
Shane Watson 143 (107); Ben Stokes 5/61 (10 overs)		Ravi Bopara 62 (66); James Faulkner 3/38 (9 overs)

Australia won by 49 runs
Rose Bowl, Southampton
Umpires: Aleem Dar (Pak) and Rob Bailey (Eng)
Player of the match: Shane Watson (Aus)

- Australia won the toss and elected to bat.
- Rain delayed the toss and interrupted the Australian innings during the 10th over, but there was no loss of overs.
- Chris Jordan (Eng) made his ODI debut.
- Ben Stokes (Eng) took his maiden five-wicket haul in ODIs.

== Broadcasters ==
Country	TV broadcaster(s)
Australia	GEM; Fox Sports
India	STAR Cricket
Middle East	Orbit Show Network
Pakistan	PTV Sports
South Africa	SuperSport
United Kingdom	Sky Sports
