= 2013 Ashes series =

- Part of Australian cricket team in England in 2013
- The Investec Ashes Series 2013 logo
- Date: 10 July – 25 August 2013
- Location: England
- Result: England won the five-Test series 3–0
- Player of the series: Ian Bell (Eng) and Ryan Harris (Aus); Compton–Miller Medal: Ian Bell (Eng)
Teams
- England: Australia
Captains
- Alastair Cook: Michael Clarke
Most runs
- Ian Bell (562) Kevin Pietersen (388) Joe Root (339): Shane Watson (418); Michael Clarke (381); Chris Rogers (367)
Most wickets
- Graeme Swann (26) Stuart Broad (22) James Anderson (22): Ryan Harris (24); Peter Siddle (17); Mitchell Starc (11)

The 2013 Ashes series (known as the Investec 2013 Ashes Series for sponsorship reasons) was a series of Test cricket matches contested between England and Australia for the Ashes. It formed part of the 2013 Australian tour of England, which also included the 2013 ICC Champions Trophy, five One Day Internationals and two Twenty20 Internationals.

The 2013 series was the first of two back-to-back Ashes series. With the intent of breaking the cycle of Ashes series being held directly before Cricket World Cups, the Ashes were brought forward in the schedule by one year, starting with the 2013–14 series in Australia.

England won the series 3–0, with wins at Trent Bridge, Lord's and the Riverside Ground; the matches at Old Trafford and The Oval finished as draws. This was the first time since 1977 that Australia had not won a Test match in an Ashes series, and the first time since 1981 that England had won three consecutive Ashes series.

== Venues ==
The five venues used in the series were Trent Bridge, Lord's, Old Trafford, the Riverside Ground and The Oval. There were questions as to whether Lord's would host an Ashes match – it would have been the first time since 1882 that Lord's had not hosted an Ashes Test – but the venues were eventually confirmed to include Lord's on 22 September 2011. On 1 June 2012, it was announced that the first Test was scheduled to take place at Trent Bridge.

It was the first Ashes series held in England since 1977 not to include a match at Edgbaston.

== Squads ==
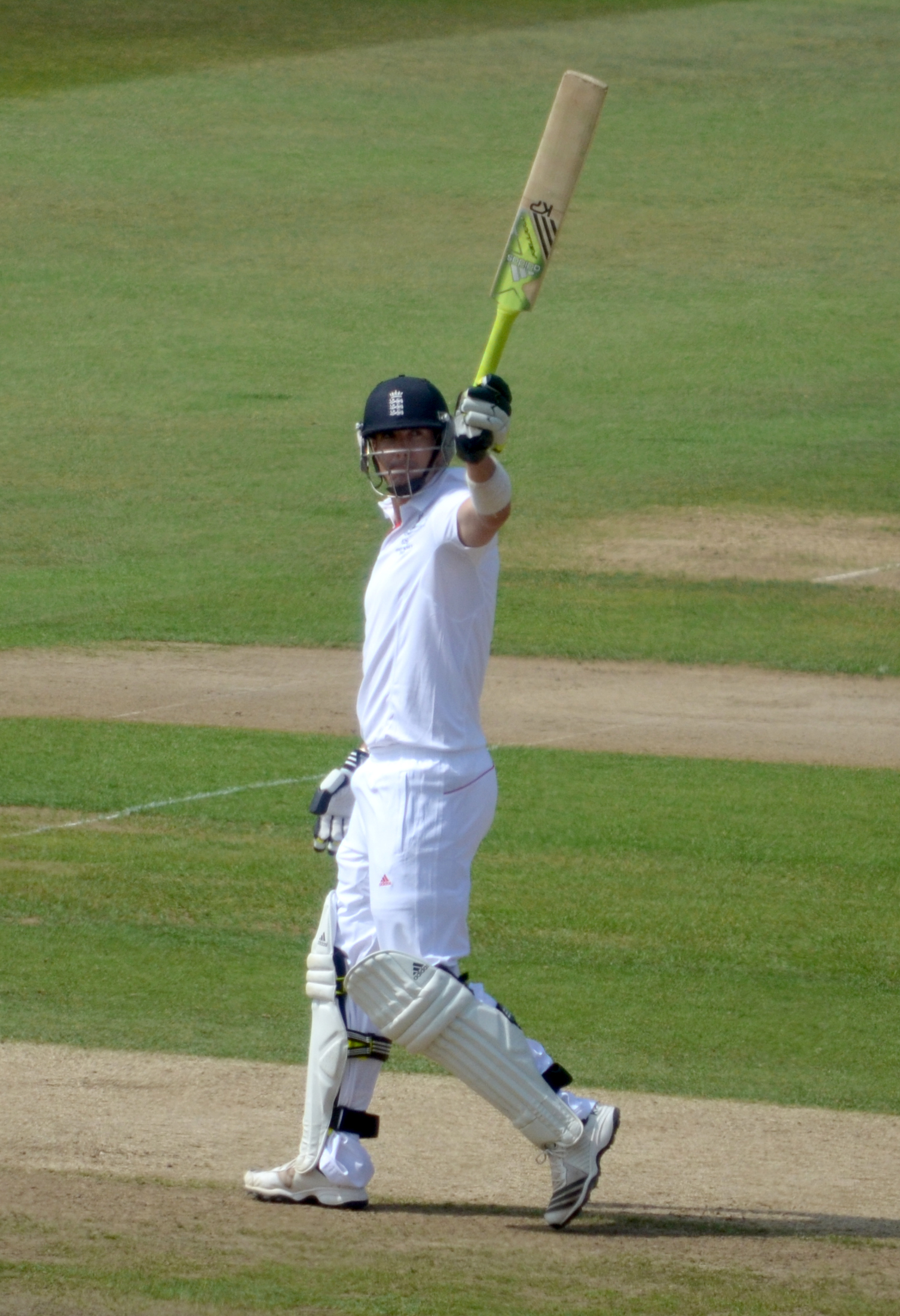
Kevin Pietersen celebrates a half century on the 3rd day of the 1st Test of the 2013 England v Australia Ashes series at Trent Bridge, Nottingham.

The Australia squad was announced on 24 April 2013. The squad included players for the entire Australian tour of England and Scotland, including the 2013 ICC Champions Trophy, the T20I series against England, and the ODI series against both England and Scotland. Among those selected were 35-year-old opening batsman Chris Rogers, five years after his only other Test cap, and uncapped all-rounder James Faulkner. Despite having played in nine of the last 10 Ashes Tests, seamer Mitchell Johnson was omitted from the squad, as was the highly rated, Pakistan-born leg spinner, Fawad Ahmed, who had not yet received his Australian passport.

England batsman Ian Bell scores a century at Lord's with a push to point.

All-rounder Steve Smith was added to the squad on 23 June after captain Michael Clarke suffered injury concerns, while left-arm orthodox spinner Ashton Agar was called up as back up for Nathan Lyon after taking six wickets for Australia A in three matches against Scotland, Ireland and Gloucestershire. Having been suspended until the start of the first Test for punching Joe Root on a night out during the Champions Trophy, opening batsman David Warner was sent on the Australia A tour of southern Africa to regain match experience; during the tour, which lasted from 18 to 27 July, Warner remained part of the Australian Ashes squad.

The England squad for the first Test was announced on 6 July 2013, the most notable absentee being batsman Nick Compton, who had opened the batting with captain Alastair Cook in each of the nine Tests since the retirement of former captain Andrew Strauss; Compton was replaced in the opening partnership by 22-year-old Joe Root. Middle-order batsman Kevin Pietersen and spinner Graeme Swann were included after overcoming injury troubles from earlier in the year, while Tim Bresnan, Steven Finn and Graham Onions were all selected as competition for the third seam bowling spot alongside James Anderson and Stuart Broad.

After naming an unchanged squad for the first two Tests, England were forced into a change for the third Test after Pietersen suffered a calf injury on the third day at Lord's. After much speculation regarding his replacement, Nottinghamshire batsman James Taylor was called up on the back of an unbeaten century against the Australians in a tour match against Sussex, for whom he was making a guest appearance. The England selectors also made the decision to allow Finn and Onions to return to their clubs, to be replaced by seamer Chris Tremlett and another spin option in Monty Panesar. Following the fourth Test at Chester-le-Street, Tim Bresnan was ruled out for the summer, so Simon Kerrigan and Chris Woakes were given surprise call-ups and would both go on to make their debuts in the fifth Test at The Oval.

England	Australia
Alastair Cook (c); Kevin Pietersen (vc); James Anderson; Jonny Bairstow; Ian Bell; Tim Bresnan; Stuart Broad; Steven Finn; Simon Kerrigan^{†}; Graham Onions; Monty Panesar^{†}; Matt Prior (wk); Joe Root; Graeme Swann; James Taylor^{†}; Chris Tremlett^{†}; Jonathan Trott; Chris Woakes^{†}	Michael Clarke (c); Brad Haddin (vc, wk); Ashton Agar^{†}; Jackson Bird; Ed Cowan; James Faulkner; Ryan Harris; Phillip Hughes; Usman Khawaja; Nathan Lyon; James Pattinson; Chris Rogers; Peter Siddle; Steve Smith^{†}; Mitchell Starc; Matthew Wade (wk); David Warner; Shane Watson

^{†} Late addition to squad

== Matches ==
=== First Test ===
10–14 July (Note: While five days of play were scheduled for each Test, the first, second and fourth Tests reached a result within four days.)
Scorecard

England	v	Australia
215 (59 overs); Jonathan Trott 48 (80); Peter Siddle 5/50 (14 overs)		280 (64.5 overs); Ashton Agar 98 (101); James Anderson 5/85 (24 overs)
375 (149.5 overs); Ian Bell 109 (267); Mitchell Starc 3/81 (32 overs)		296 (110.5 overs); Brad Haddin 71 (147); James Anderson 5/73 (31.5 overs)

England won by 14 runs
Trent Bridge, Nottingham
Umpires: Aleem Dar (Pak) and Kumar Dharmasena (SL)
Player of the match: James Anderson (Eng)

- England won the toss and elected to bat.
- Ashton Agar (Aus) made his Test debut.
- Agar's score of 98 set the Test record for the most runs in an innings by a number 11 batsman and by a number 11 on debut.
- The 163-run partnership between Agar and Phillip Hughes was the highest 10th-wicket partnership in Test history.
- England won the opening Test match of an Ashes series for the first time since 1997.

The first Test was noted as a dramatic match with the advantage swinging between the two sides, culminating in a close result. England's opening innings of 215 all out was considered disappointing, however Australia seemed to be heading to a significant deficit after being reduced to 117/9 in the following innings. The record-breaking 10th-wicket stand revived the tourists to an unexpected 65-run lead by the end of the innings. England reclaimed the upper hand in the third innings, with Ian Bell's century contributing to a total of 375, setting Australia a target of 311 to win the Test. England looked to be in a strong position, as there had been only 10 recorded successful fourth-innings run chases of over 300 in Test history. However, Australia had a strong showing with the bat and were only 15 runs short of victory by the time the final partnership was broken in the afternoon session of the fifth day.

=== Second Test ===
18–22 July
Scorecard

England	v	Australia
361 (100.1 overs); Ian Bell 109 (211); Ryan Harris 5/72 (26 overs)		128 (53.3 overs); Shane Watson 30 (42); Graeme Swann 5/44 (21.3 overs)
349/7d (114.1 overs); Joe Root 180 (338); Peter Siddle 3/65 (21 overs)		235 (90.3 overs); Usman Khawaja 54 (133); Graeme Swann 4/78 (30.3 overs)

England won by 347 runs
Lord's Cricket Ground, London
Umpires: Kumar Dharmasena (SL) and Marais Erasmus (SA)
Player of the match: Joe Root (Eng)

- England won the toss and elected to bat.
- Ian Bell became the fourth English batsman to score a century in three successive Ashes matches.

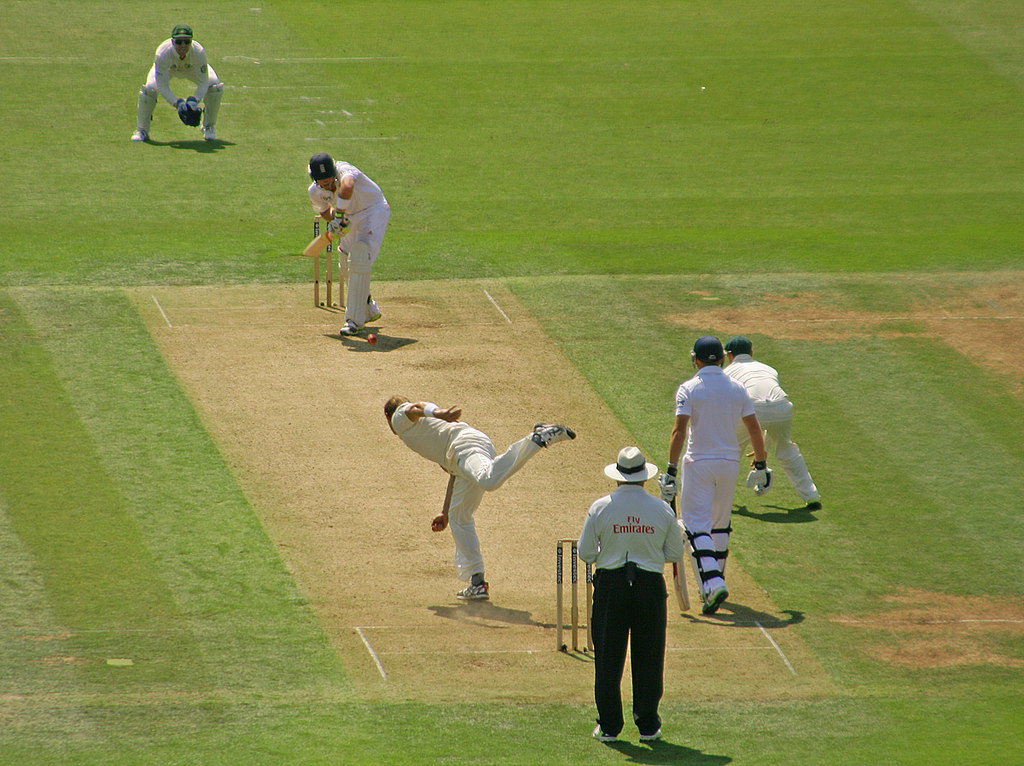
Shane Watson bowls to Jonathan Trott on the first day of the Test

In comparison to the close first Test, the second match of the series was a much easier victory for England. Though losing their first three wickets for just 28 runs England managed 361 by the time their final wicket fell in the morning session on day two. Australia only managed a response of 128, their lowest total at Lord's since 1968, with the second innings ending before the end of the day's play. With a lead of over 200 runs, England captain Alastair Cook had the option of making the Australians follow-on, but elected not to. In the third innings, Australia managed to reduce England to 30/3, but from then on, England were dominant, with Joe Root scoring 180 in 338 balls and 466 minutes at the crease. Immediately following Root's dismissal early on the fourth day, Cook declared at 349/7. England managed to dismiss Australia before the end of the day's play, securing a 2–0 lead in the series.

=== Third Test ===
1–5 August
Scorecard

Australia	v	England
527/7d (146 overs); Michael Clarke 187 (314); Graeme Swann 5/159 (43 overs)		368 (139.3 overs); Kevin Pietersen 113 (206); Mitchell Starc 3/76 (27 overs)
172/7d (36 overs); David Warner 41 (57); Tim Bresnan 2/25 (6 overs)		37/3 (20.3 overs); Joe Root 13* (57); Ryan Harris 2/13 (7 overs)

Match drawn
Old Trafford, Manchester
Umpires: Marais Erasmus (SA) and Tony Hill (NZ)
Player of the match: Michael Clarke (Aus)

- Australia won the toss and elected to bat.
- Rain and bad light on day 4 reduced play to 56 overs.
- Rain on day 5 meant only 20.3 overs could be bowled and play was abandoned at 16:40.
- England retained the Ashes as a result of this match

England went into the third Test needing only a draw to retain the Ashes. (Note: Following the drawn third Test, England's lead was 2–0 with only two Tests to go, meaning the best possible result for Australia was a 2–2 tie. A side holding the Ashes, as England were going into the series, is considered to retain the Ashes if they win or draw the series.) In the opening innings the English bowlers were ineffective against the Australian batsmen, with captain Michael Clarke scoring 187 runs. Australia ended up batting for most of the first two days before declaring on 527/7. England's second innings batting response was slow, scoring 368 all out at an average run rate of just 2.63 runs per over. However England critically managed to avoid the follow-on and consumed much of the time remaining in the game; Australia began the third innings shortly before lunch on the fourth day. Australia quickly scored 172 runs at a run rate of 4.77 runs per over, and elected to declare overnight, hoping to bowl England out on the final day to win the game. However rain and poor light meant that only 20 overs were played. With the match declared a draw England retained the Ashes.

=== Fourth Test ===
9–13 August
Scorecard

England	v	Australia
238 (92 overs); Alastair Cook 51 (164); Nathan Lyon 4/42 (20 overs)		270 (89.3 overs); Chris Rogers 110 (250); Stuart Broad 5/71 (24.3 overs)
330 (95.1 overs); Ian Bell 113 (210); Ryan Harris 7/117 (28 overs)		224 (68.3 overs); David Warner 71 (113); Stuart Broad 6/50 (18.3 overs)

England won by 74 runs
Riverside Ground, Chester-le-Street
Umpires: Aleem Dar (Pak) and Tony Hill (NZ)
Player of the match: Stuart Broad (Eng)

- England won the toss and elected to bat.
- Bad light on day 2 reduced play to 76.4 overs.
- Rain delayed the start after lunch on day 4.

Having already at least drawn the series, England's first innings was slow with an average run rate of only 2.58 per over. England managed to hit 149/2 before succumbing to a run total of 238 early on the second day of the test. Australia's response was marginally better, with Chris Rogers hitting a century to contribute to his team's 270-run innings despite bad light. In the third innings, Australia were unable to prevent Ian Bell from securing his third century of the series by the close of the third day. England made 330 all-out, leaving a target of 299. In the fourth innings, England dismissed Australia for 224 by the end of the fourth day to secure an unassailable 3–0 lead in the series.

=== Fifth Test ===
21–25 August
Scorecard

Australia	v	England
492/9d (128.5 overs); Shane Watson 176 (247); James Anderson 4/95 (29.5 overs)		377 (144.4 overs); Joe Root 68 (184); James Faulkner 4/51 (19.4 overs)
111/6d (23 overs); Michael Clarke 28* (28); Stuart Broad 4/43 (10 overs)		206/5 (40 overs); Kevin Pietersen 62 (55); Ryan Harris 2/21 (5 overs)

Match drawn
The Oval, London
Umpires: Aleem Dar (Pak) and Kumar Dharmasena (SL)
Player of the match: Shane Watson (Aus)

- Australia won the toss and elected to bat.
- Rain delayed the start of day 2.
- No play on day 4 due to rain.
- Play was brought to a close with four overs left to play on day 5 due to bad light.
- Simon Kerrigan, Chris Woakes (both Eng) and James Faulkner (Aus) made their Test debuts.
- Steve Smith (Aus) scored his maiden Test century.
- The 447 runs scored on day 5 set a record for the most runs scored on the final day of an Ashes Test.

Fireworks were released from the Pavilion at The Oval at the end of the fifth Test.

Australia started strongly with both Shane Watson and Steven Smith hitting centuries in their first innings. Australia captain Michael Clarke opted to declare for 492/9 on the second day of the test. As in the previous test, England's first innings was slow with an average run rate of 2.6 per over. With rain forcing play to be abandoned on the fourth day, England managed to push to 377 all out just after lunch on the fifth day.

In an attempt to try and force a result, Australia took the offensive against England's bowling attack in the afternoon session. Despite losing 6 quick wickets, they added 111 runs in less than two hours before Michael Clarke declared, setting England a target of 227 from 44 overs. This gave England a realistic target if they decided to play aggressively, but with the looming possibility of giving away wickets and a chance for Australia to bowl them out to win if they risked it.

England's 2nd innings started positively, but through the first 15 overs they were barely scoring at 4 runs an over and had lost the wicket of Joe Root. Although Cook and Trott's 50 partnership came up in 74 balls, Cook was out LBW to Faulkner soon after drinks; with England at 86/2, still well behind the required run-rate despite scoring markedly more quickly than their first innings, it looked increasingly like the match was heading for a somewhat predictable draw. However, Cook's departure brought Kevin Pietersen to the crease - at which point Michael Atherton reminisced on commentary on Pietersen's extraordinary innings of 158 at the Oval in the 2005 Ashes series, wondering aloud whether he might be able to reproduce some of that same magic. Indeed, with just 23 overs left, the required run rate had climbed to more than 6 runs per over, so if England were going to make a serious attempt at winning the match, it had to be done immediately.

Pietersen led the charge, hitting 9 boundaries in a quick-fire 50 partnership with Trott which was brought up in just 48 balls, with the latter contributing only 7 off 19 of those deliveries. Having been at the crease for barely 45 minutes, Pietersen brought up his half-century off just 36 balls, but the England run chase had stalled somewhat through excellent Australian bowling and fielding, limiting scoring chances, leaving England needing 64 to win off the final 10 overs. Pietersen was then caught at cow-corner for 62, but his innings had kept England in with an outside chance of winning the game. Trott was then out LBW to Faulkner just 8 balls later for, given the circumstances, a pedestrian 59 of 87 balls, but Bell and Woakes ran between the wickets very aggressively to bring the target to 36 runs of the final 36 balls of the match, prompting the crowd to begin to think that an unlikely England win was actually possible. However, the umpires at this point began chivvying the Australian side to be quicker between deliveries and not to unnecessarily waste time as the daylight was deteriorating quickly. When Starc brilliantly ran out Bell for 17 off his own bowling, the umpires decided to take the players off for bad light at 7:36pm, with England needing 21 runs from the final four overs.

The run chase was brought to a halt, and the match declared as a draw. England accordingly won the Ashes series 3–0. The umpires' decision to end the game early was controversial, with commentator Jonathan Agnew declaring it an "absolute disgrace".

== Statistics ==
=== Individual ===
Statistic	England		Australia	
Most runs	Ian Bell	562	Shane Watson	418
Highest innings	Joe Root	180	Michael Clarke	187
Highest batting average	Ian Bell	62.44	Michael Clarke	47.62
Most centuries	Ian Bell	3	Michael Clarke; Shane Watson; Chris Rogers; Steve Smith	1
Most fifties	Kevin Pietersen; Alastair Cook	3	Chris Rogers; Steve Smith; Brad Haddin	2
Most fours	Ian Bell	75	Shane Watson	57
Most sixes	Kevin Pietersen; Joe Root; Graeme Swann	2	Steve Smith	5
Most wickets	Graeme Swann	26	Ryan Harris	24
Most five-wicket hauls	Stuart Broad; Graeme Swann; James Anderson	2	Ryan Harris	2
Best innings figures	Stuart Broad	18.3–3–50–6	Ryan Harris	28–2–117–7
Best bowling average (specialist bowlers only)	Stuart Broad	27.45	Ryan Harris	19.58
Most catches (wicket-keepers excluded)	Alastair Cook	7	Michael Clarke	6
Most dismissals (wicket-keepers only)	Matt Prior	18 (18c/0st)	Brad Haddin	29 (29c/0st)

- Brad Haddin's 29 dismissals in the series (all caught) set a new record for the most dismissals by a wicketkeeper in a Test series.

=== Team ===
Statistic	England	Australia
Highest team innings (Note: Completed innings only)	377	527/7d
Lowest team innings	215	111/6d

== Decision Review System ==
The implementation of DRS in this series resulted in several controversies, mostly relating to the use of the Hot Spot technology. The most high-profile occurred in the first innings of the third Test: Usman Khawaja was given out caught-behind by on-field umpire Tony Hill, and reviewed the decision; Hot Spot showed no sign of an edge, and many observers noted that visual evidence also appeared to show that Khawaja did not edge the ball, but the decision was not overturned. Cricket Australia requested a formal explanation of the decision from the ICC following the match, and the decision was heavily criticised in Australian media. Kevin Pietersen was dismissed in similar circumstances in the second innings of the same match.

After the third Test, allegations were made by Australian broadcaster Channel Nine that batsmen were trying to avoid Hot Spot detections by applying silicone tape to their bats. While such a practice would have been technically legal under the laws of cricket, Kevin Pietersen, who was specifically named in the claims, angrily denied the allegations, and the ICC did not investigate the claims. In October 2013, Pietersen won libel damages from Specsavers after they ran an advert that implied that he had tampered with his bat.

== Broadcasters ==
The Australian live television rights to the series were shared by the Nine Network and Fox Sports, and the British rights by Sky Sports with daily highlights broadcast on Channel 5. Live radio commentary in the UK was provided by BBC Test Match Special, which was syndicated on ABC Radio Grandstand in Australia.

Country	TV Broadcaster(s)
Australia	GEM; Fox Sports
India; Nepal	STAR Cricket
Ireland	Sky Sports
Middle East	OSN
New Zealand	Sky Sport
Pakistan	PTV Sports
South Africa; Zimbabwe	SuperSport
United Kingdom	Sky Sports; Channel 5 (highlights only)
United States	Willow Cricket

== See also ==
- Ashes Cricket 2013, a video game
