= Ryan Harris (cricketer) =

Australian cricketer (born 1979)

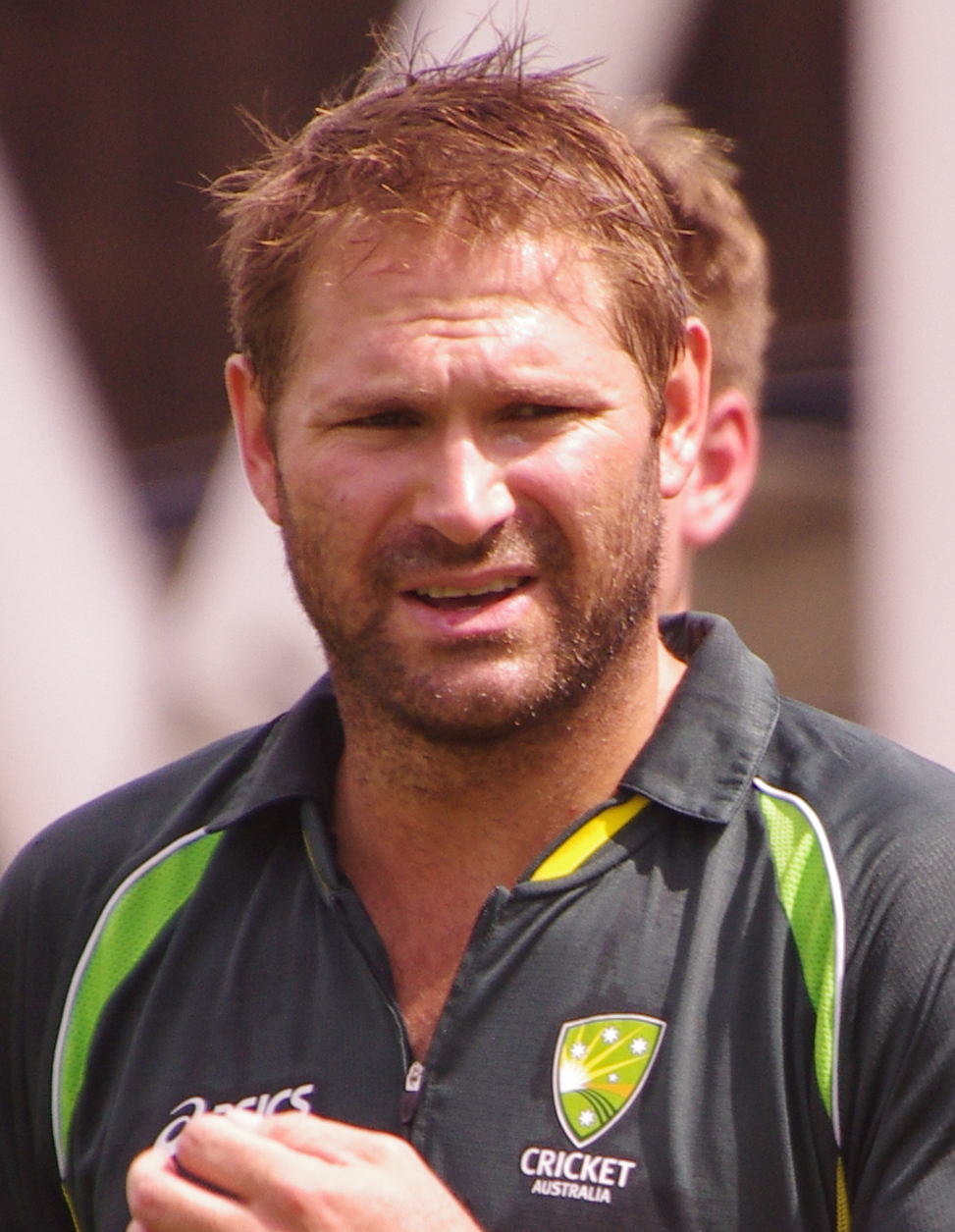
- Harris in 2014

Personal information
- Full name: Ryan James Harris
- Born: 11 October 1979 (age 47); Sydney, New South Wales, Australia
- Nickname: Ryno, Ryano
- Height: 1.81 m (5 ft 11 in)
- Batting: Right-handed
- Bowling: Right-arm fast
- Role: Bowler

International information
- National side: Australia (2009–2015)
- Test debut (cap 413): 19 March 2010 v New Zealand
- Last Test: 6 January 2015 v India
- ODI debut (cap 169): 18 January 2009 v South Africa
- Last ODI: 24 February 2012 v Sri Lanka
- ODI shirt no.: 45
- T20I debut (cap 45): 23 February 2010 v West Indies
- Last T20I: 5 May 2010 v Bangladesh

Domestic team information
- Years: Team
- 2000/01–2007/08: South Australia (squad no. 24)
- 2008: Sussex
- 2008/09–2014/15: Queensland (squad no. 45)
- 2009–2010: Deccan Chargers (squad no. 7)
- 2009: Surrey
- 2011–2013: Kings XI Punjab (squad no. 45)
- 2011/12–2013/14: Brisbane Heat (squad no. 45)

Career statistics
Competition	Test	ODI	FC	LA
Matches	27	21	82	85
Runs scored	603	48	2,056	411
Batting average	21.53	8.00	20.15	12.84
100s/50s	0/3	0/0	0/11	0/0
Top score	74	21	94	39
Balls bowled	5,736	1,031	16,387	4,135
Wickets	113	44	303	123
Bowling average	23.52	18.90	26.55	27.59
5 wickets in innings	5	3	10	4
10 wickets in match	0	0	0	0
Best bowling	7/117	5/19	7/60	5/19
Catches/stumpings	13/–	6/–	41/–	33/–
- Source: ESPNcricinfo, 17 May 2021

Ryan James Harris (born 11 October 1979) is an Australian cricket coach and former cricketer. He was a right-arm fast bowler who was a member of the Australia national cricket team until retiring in the Ashes tour lead up of 2015 due to a knee injury. It had hampered him for a majority of his career, but despite this, he performed as one of Australia's most highly rated fast bowlers. His first ball bowling of Alastair Cook in the 2013-14 Ashes series has been rated as one of the greatest balls of all time.

== Playing career ==
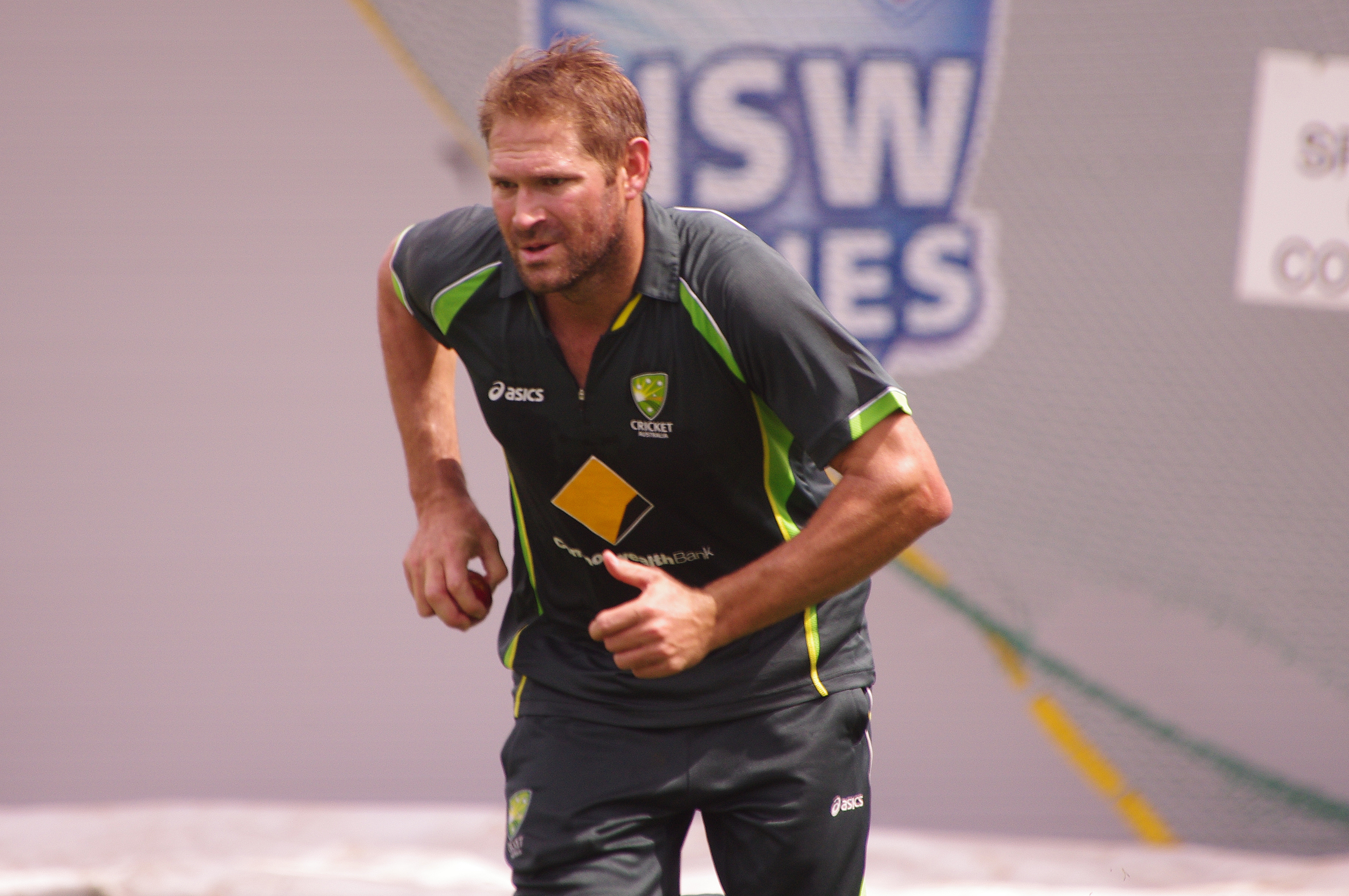
Harris in 2014

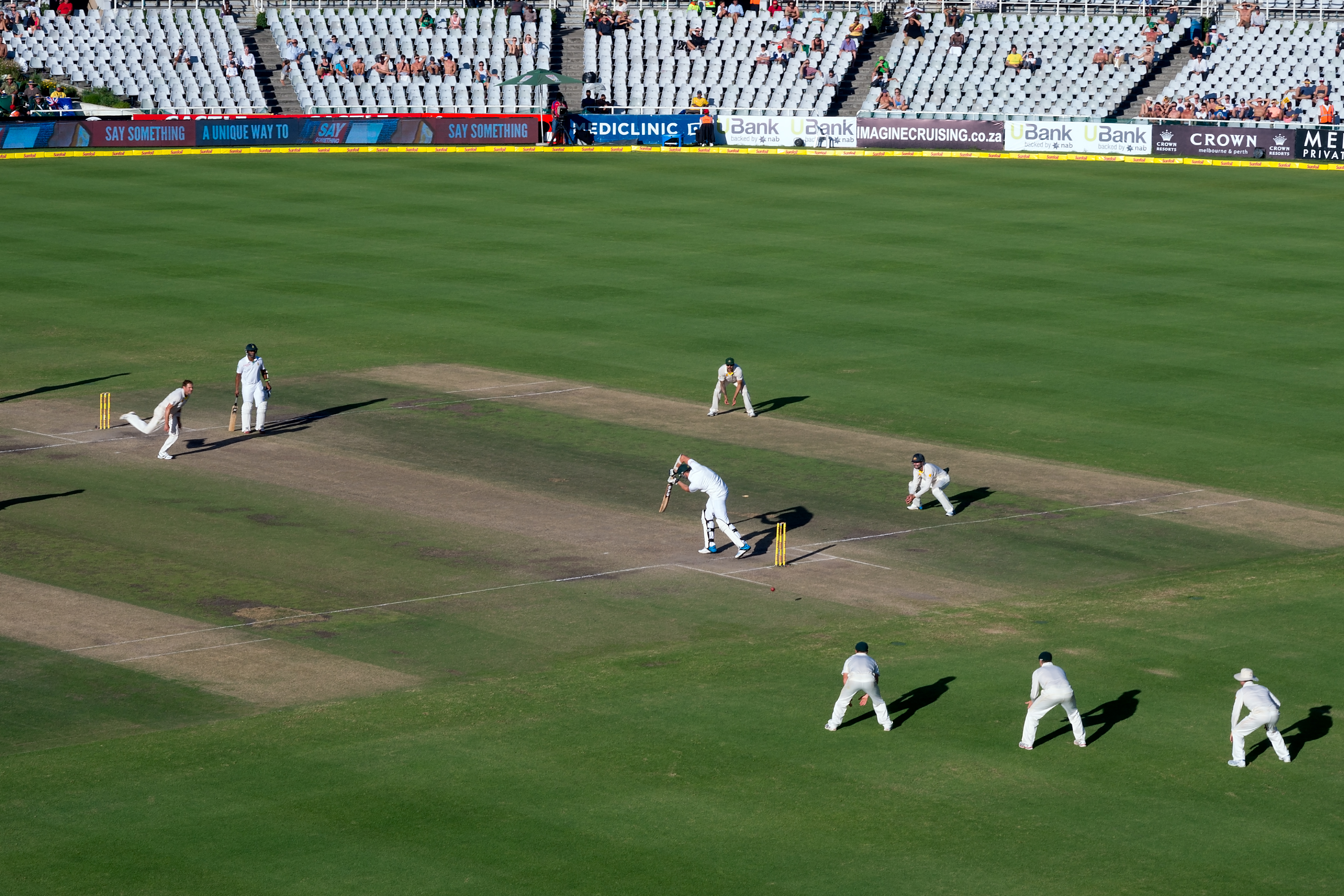
Ryan Harris bowls Morne Morkel to secure victory and a series win in the 3rd Test at Cape Town in March 2014.

Ryan Harris played with the Southern Redbacks from 2001–02 to 2007–08. He was due to represent Sussex County Cricket Club in the 2008 English summer but the deal fell through when he moved to Queensland because it breached his Sussex contract. A week earlier he had played a first-class match for Sussex against the Marylebone Cricket Club. In June, 2009, he was signed by Surrey on a short-term contract, while in 2010 he played domestic cricket for Yorkshire.

Harris moved to Queensland in 2008 and played for Toombul District Cricket Club in Brisbane.

Harris was a part of the Deccan Chargers squad that won the IPL in 2009 in South Africa. In late 2008, he was signed to an Indian Premier League contract with the Deccan Chargers, who are coached by his former Redbacks teammate Darren Lehmann. Having been selected for the Australian Twenty-20 team in early 2009, he was directly signed as an "uncapped" player by the Deccan Chargers, at the behest of Lehmann, without having to go through the standard IPL player auction process.

Harris made his international debut in a One Day International against South Africa in Hobart on 18 January 2009, during which he took the wicket of Neil McKenzie in a spell of 1/54. Nevertheless, he was not selected for another ODI for over a year. on 26 January 2010, Harris was called up into the Australian squad for the 3rd ODI against Pakistan at the Adelaide Oval as cover for Peter Siddle, who was ruled out due to a back injury. Although not required to bat, Harris opened the bowling with Doug Bollinger and took 5/43, including the wickets of Kamran Akmal and Shahid Afridi. He claimed man of the match honours and was picked for the 4th and 5th ODIs against Pakistan. In the next match in that series, Harris claimed 5/19, a second consecutive five wicket haul, behind only following Waqar Younis' three consecutive five-fors.

Harris was named the man of the series after securing another three wickets in the fifth and final match, taking his tally to 13 wickets in three matches, at an average of 8.15 and strike rate of 13.7.

In March 2010, Harris was called up to the Australian squad for the first time, for the Test series in New Zealand. He made his Test debut in the first game, taking 2/42 and 4/77. In the 2nd Test, Harris took 3/50 and 0/38. A knee injury later ruled him out of the Tests against Pakistan in England and the subsequent tour to India, but he was recalled to the Test squad for the 2nd Test against England at Adelaide in December 2010. At Adelaide, Harris had the best figures for the Australian bowlers, taking 2/84 in a match that England won by an innings and 71 runs, however in the 3rd Test at Perth, Harris took 3/59 in the first innings and then 6/47 in the second, as Australia levelled the series.

During 2011, Harris was a member of the Australian team that toured Sri Lanka and South Africa. He took 11 wickets in the two-Test series against Sri Lanka before suffering a hip injury against South Africa in Cape Town. He returned to the Australian team for the third and fourth Tests of the home series against India, taking match figures of 2/67 and 4/112 respectively as Australia won the series 4–0.

During the 2013 Ashes series Harris was overlooked for the first test against England at Trent Bridge but returned to the team for the second at Lord's, picking up 5 wickets in the first innings to go on the Lord's honours boards and 2 in the second innings. Following this he finished the fourth Test in Durham with 2 wickets in the first innings and 7 in the second innings. During the 3rd test match against South Africa, he took his 100th test wicket when he trapped Alviro Petersen leg before wicket. This made him one of only four test bowlers, who made their test debut after the age of 30, to take 100 test wickets. The other three are Clarrie Grimmett, Dilip Doshi and Saeed Ajmal. He is the only fast bowler to do so.

In March 2014 it was announced that Harris would be out for about six months following knee surgery. He announced his retirement from cricket in July 2015, three days before the start of the Ashes.

== Coaching career ==
In October 2019, Harris was appointed as the bowling coach of Brisbane Heat men's professional Twenty20 cricket team for the 2019 Big Bash League (BBL) cricket tournament.

Harris was appointed as bowling coach of Indian Premier League franchise Delhi Capitals in 2020. In August 2024, he was named the new head coach of South Australia, going on to win both the One Day domestic cup and Sheffield Shield in his first season.

== Personal life ==
Harris is a dual citizen of the UK and Australia, due to his father being born in Leicester. He revealed during the 2013 Ashes of how he almost opted to play for England.

Harris lives with his wife Cherie, whom he married in 2012, in Brisbane. In 2015, the couple had their first child; Harris missed the 2015 West Indies tour to be present at the birth.
