= Peter Faulkner =

Australian first-class cricketer (born 1960)

Personal information
- Full name: Peter Ian Faulkner
- Born: 18 April 1960 (age 66); Launceston, Tasmania, Australia
- Batting: Right-handed
- Bowling: Right-arm fast-medium
- Role: All-rounder
- Relatives: James Faulkner (son)

Domestic team information
- Years: Team
- 1980/81–1989/90: Tasmania
- FC debut: 12 November 1982 Tasmania v Victoria
- Last FC: 22 January 1990 Tasmania v South Australia
- LA debut: 16 January 1981 Tasmania v Western Australia
- Last LA: 26 February 1989 Tasmania v New South Wales

Career statistics
Competition	First-class	List A
Matches	54	27
Runs scored	2,115	353
Batting average	30.21	18.57
100s/50s	2/11	0/0
Top score	109	45
Balls bowled	10,058	1,328
Wickets	101	20
Bowling average	45.02	48.10
5 wickets in innings	1	0
10 wickets in match	0	0
Best bowling	5/49	3/42
Catches/stumpings	18/–	5/–
- Source: CricketArchive, 15 September 2011

Peter Ian Faulkner (born 18 April 1960) is an Australian former first-class cricketer who played for Tasmania. An allrounder, he took over 100 wickets and made over 2000 runs in his first-class career. He never played for Australia although he toured South Africa in 1985/86 and 1986/87 with the rebel Australian XI and he was selected in an Australian one day squad during the 1984-85 summer, and toured Zimbabwe with an Australian Under 25 team.

Peter's son James plays for Tasmania and has played internationally for Australia.

== Career ==
In 1980/81 Faulkner captained the Tasmanian Colts. That summer he made his debut for Tasmania in a McDonald's Cup Game against WA, top scoring with 45.

Faulkner did not make his first class debut until the 1982–83 season, against Victoria. In his second game, against the touring Sri Lankan team, he took 4 wickets. He then took 3–5 in 19 balls against West Australia, and a second innings knock of 47 off 131 balls helped Tasmania draw the game.

In 1983-84 Faulkner became a regular member of Tasmania's Sheffield Shield team. He made 57 not out against South Australia, 4 wickets and 61 not out against Queensland, 52 against Victoria, 84 against Western Australia, took 4-95 and 3–30 against the touring Pakistan team and made 76 against NSW.

In 1984 Faulkner played in the Lancashire League in England.

=== Fringe international ===
In 1984-85 he was selected in the Prime Minister's XI to play the West Indies, replacing an injured Craig McDermott. He took 1-81 and scored 59 not out, taking part in a 104 run partnership with Allan Border, but the team lost. This effort saw him selected in the Australian one day squad for the World Championship of Cricket.

Faulkner was not picked but impressed with 71 against Queensland. He was named in an under 25 squad to tour Zimbabwe.

=== South Africa ===
Faulkner then announced he signed to tour South Africa. He was replaced on the Zimbabwe tour by David Gilbert. He was banned from Australian first class cricket for two years and from test cricket for three years.

He played in two unofficial tests, one in 1985-86 one in 1986–87. Highlights of his trip included a century against Northern Districts.

He resumed playing for Tasmania in 1987–88. He played his last game for Tasmania against Victoria in 1989–90.

== Later career ==
After his playing career finished Faulkner became a Tasmanian selector from 1993-94 until 2007–08. He was Chairman of Selectors in 1996–97. "As a selector I had a reputation of speaking my mind but I always stood by what was right for Tasmanian cricket," Faulkner said. During this time, Tasmania competed in four Sheffield Shield Finals, winning the state's first ever title in 2006-07 and winning the One Day competition in 2004–05, as well as being runners up in 2006–07 in the then KFC Twenty20 Big Bash.

In 2016 Faulkner was inducted into the Tasmanian Cricket Field of Fame at Blundstone Arena.
