= Simon Kerrigan =

English cricketer (born 1989)

Personal information
- Full name: Simon Christopher Kerrigan
- Born: 10 May 1989 (age 37); Preston, Lancashire, England
- Height: 5 ft 9 in (1.75 m)
- Batting: Right-handed
- Bowling: Slow left-arm orthodox
- Role: Bowler

International information
- National side: England
- Only Test (cap 656): 21 August 2013 v Australia

Domestic team information
- Years: Team
- 2010–2018: Lancashire (squad no. 10)
- 2017: → Northamptonshire (on loan)
- 2020–2023: Northamptonshire

Career statistics
Competition	Test	FC	LA	T20
Matches	1	125	45	24
Runs scored	1	1,425	48	9
Batting average	–	13.83	3.42	–
100s/50s	0/0	0/3	0/0	0/0
Top score	1*	62*	10	4*
Balls bowled	48	24,102	1,924	516
Wickets	0	364	39	20
Bowling average	–	31.68	44.23	29.75
5 wickets in innings	–	16	0	0
10 wickets in match	–	3	0	0
Best bowling	–	9/51	4/48	3/17
Catches/stumpings	0/–	45/–	14/–	11/–
- Source: CricketArchive, 28 September 2023

Simon Christopher Kerrigan (born 10 May 1989) is a retired English cricketer who last played for Northamptonshire. He bowled slow left arm orthodox spin. Kerrigan signed for Lancashire in September 2008, and made his debut for the first team in 2010, filling in for Gary Keedy, Lancashire's senior spinner. In August 2011, Kerrigan was selected for the England Lions for the first time. The following month he took the best first-class bowling figures for Lancashire since 1953 (9 wickets for 51 runs) and that year Lancashire won the County Championship for the first time since 1950.

The 2012 season saw Kerrigan replace Keedy as Lancashire's main spinner in first-class cricket. He played his only Test match in the fifth Ashes Test at The Oval in 2013.

== Career ==
Born in Preston, Lancashire, Kerrigan started his cricket as a junior at Palace Shield Premiership club Fulwood & Broughton before moving on to Ormskirk in the Liverpool and District Cricket Competition. He received his first contract with Lancashire in September 2008 along with ten other young cricketers.

In 2009, Kerrigan broke into Lancashire's second team which progressed to the final of the Second XI Championship and the semi-final of the Second XI Trophy. Gary Keedy, Lancashire's experienced and established spinner, suffered a broken collar bone in April 2010, immediately before the start of the English cricket season. With several months on the sidelines, Keedy's absence gave the opportunity to young spinners Kerrigan and Stephen Parry to play first team cricket. Lancashire coach Peter Moores said "We're lucky in some ways in that we’ve got Stephen Parry, who played quite a lot of first-team cricket last season, but we’ve also got Simon Kerrigan, who bowled beautifully to take six wickets in the pre-season game against Yorkshire in Barbados and we could also use Steven Crofty's off-spin".

Kerrigan made his first-class debut in Lancashire's first match of the season taking his maiden five wicket haul and finishing with seven wickets in the match to help Lancashire to victory over Warwickshire. His maiden wicket was that of England cricketer Ian Bell.

Kerrigan played 13 first-class matches in his first full season with Lancashire, taking 30 wickets at an average of 32.23 including three five-wicket hauls. When Keedy returned from injury he and Kerrigan sometimes bowled together in the County Championship. However, their partnership was not initially ideal as they were attempting to out perform each other. After a discussion they decided they would be more effective if they worked together to build pressure while bowling.

In February 2011, Kerrigan spent 16 days at a spin bowling camp run by the England Cricket Board (ECB). With Keedy in good form, Kerrigan did not play until Lancashire's fourth County Championship match of the 2011 season. The opportunity only arose through injuries to the team's fast bowlers. He took five wickets for seven runs (5/7) in Warwickshire's second innings to take his team to a 147-run victory. Warwickshire's coach and former England spinner Ashley Giles was impressed by Kerrigan's performance. With three wins from four matches, Lancashire moved to the top of the table.

Despite limited opportunities in the County Championship because of Keedy's dominance, Kerrigan played ten matches in the CB40 and six twenty20 games. His aim at the start of the season was to be selected for the England Lions, and following an injury to fellow left-arm spin bowler Danny Briggs this was achieved. Kerrigan was called up to the Lions squad to face Sri Lanka A in a three match one-day series in August.

While Keedy was frequently chosen over Kerrigan in the County Championship for 2011, Kerrigan cited Keedy's advice as being useful, saying "always coming down to you if he thinks you're doing something you shouldn't be doing or maybe what you should be doing". In the penultimate County Championship match of the season Kerrigan took career-best innings figures of 9/51 to take Lancashire to a 222-run win over Hampshire. The final wicket of the match was claimed with just four minutes of play left and was greeted with a mini pitch invasion as the victory kept Lancashire in contention for the title. Kerrigan recorded the best bowling figures for Lancashire since Roy Tattersall's 9/40 in 1953. In September, in the last match of the season Lancashire won the County Championship for the first time since they shared the title in 1950. Kerrigan contributed 24 wickets from the four Championship matches he played that season, placing him sixth on Lancashire's list of leading wicket-takers for the competition.

On the back of his performances for Lancashire, Kerrigan was included in the 17-man England Performance Programme squad for November and December 2011, during which time he would train in Loughborough and then Sri Lanka where he would gain experience of conditions in the country. He was also included in the 16-man England Lions squad to tour Bangladesh in January 2012. After the Lions lost a five-match one-day series against Bangladesh A 3–2, Kerrigan was one of four players left out of the squad for the tour of Sri Lanka; Kerrigan took three wickets in as many matches at an average of 44.66.

In the year Lancashire began their title defence, Kerrigan succeeded Keedy as the club's first-choice spinner in the County Championship. First-class cricket was the focus of his attention, and he played just three matches in the Clydesdale Bank 40 and none of Lancashire's twenty20 games. Kerrigan finished as Lancashire's leading wicket-taker in the Championship, with 44 wickets at an average of 34.81. He was one of two Lancashire bowlers to take more than 30 wickets in the competition that year (the other was club captain and seam bowler Glen Chapple). Lancashire were relegated to the second division of the Championship. Kerrigan's rise meant Keedy was restricted to four appearances in the County Championship and at the end of the year Keedy left the club. After the English cricket season finished, Kerrigan spent time with the England Performance Squad and practised bowling in limited-overs cricket as Lancashire had preferred Keedy and Parry in their one-day teams that year.

Lancashire spent one season in the second division of the County Championship, winning the 2013 division title to seal promotion at the first attempt. Kerrigan played regularly for the England Lions and in August that year was called into the England squad to face Australia in the fifth and final Ashes Test of the summer to share spin bowling duties with Graeme Swann. At that stage of the season Kerrigan had played ten County Championship matches and taken 47 wickets. On 21 August 2013, Kerrigan made his Test match debut along with seam bowling all-rounder Chris Woakes. England had already secured a series victory by winning three of the first four fixtures. Kerrigan bowled eight overs in the match, conceding 53 runs. Shane Watson in particular attacked Kerrigan's bowling en route to his highest Test score.

Straight after the 2013 Ashes in England, the return leg was held in Australia from November 2013 to January 2014. Kerrigan was replaced as England's second spinner in the squad by Monty Panesar, but was still included in the England Performance Squad. Graeme Swann retired from international cricket during the series, and Kerrigan's "traumatic debut" meant that it was unclear who would replace him in the Test team. Moeen Ali was preferred initially, though on 13 July 2014 Kerrigan was called up for the Indian-England 2014 test series.

England captain Alastair Cook remarked "Clearly he had a tough experience in the one Test he played. He's been good around us and bowled beautifully in the nets (during the first Test). .... Simon is a tough lad – he went away with the Lions and did well. I have no doubt in his toughness and he will be a fine bowler for England."

However, he was not selected to play against India and his county form never returned to the level that brought him an England call-up. He was released by Lancashire in 2018, but in 2020 he signed for Northamptonshire, a county he had previously played for on loan.

He announced his retirement in September 2023.
