= James Faulkner (cricketer) =

Former Australian cricketer

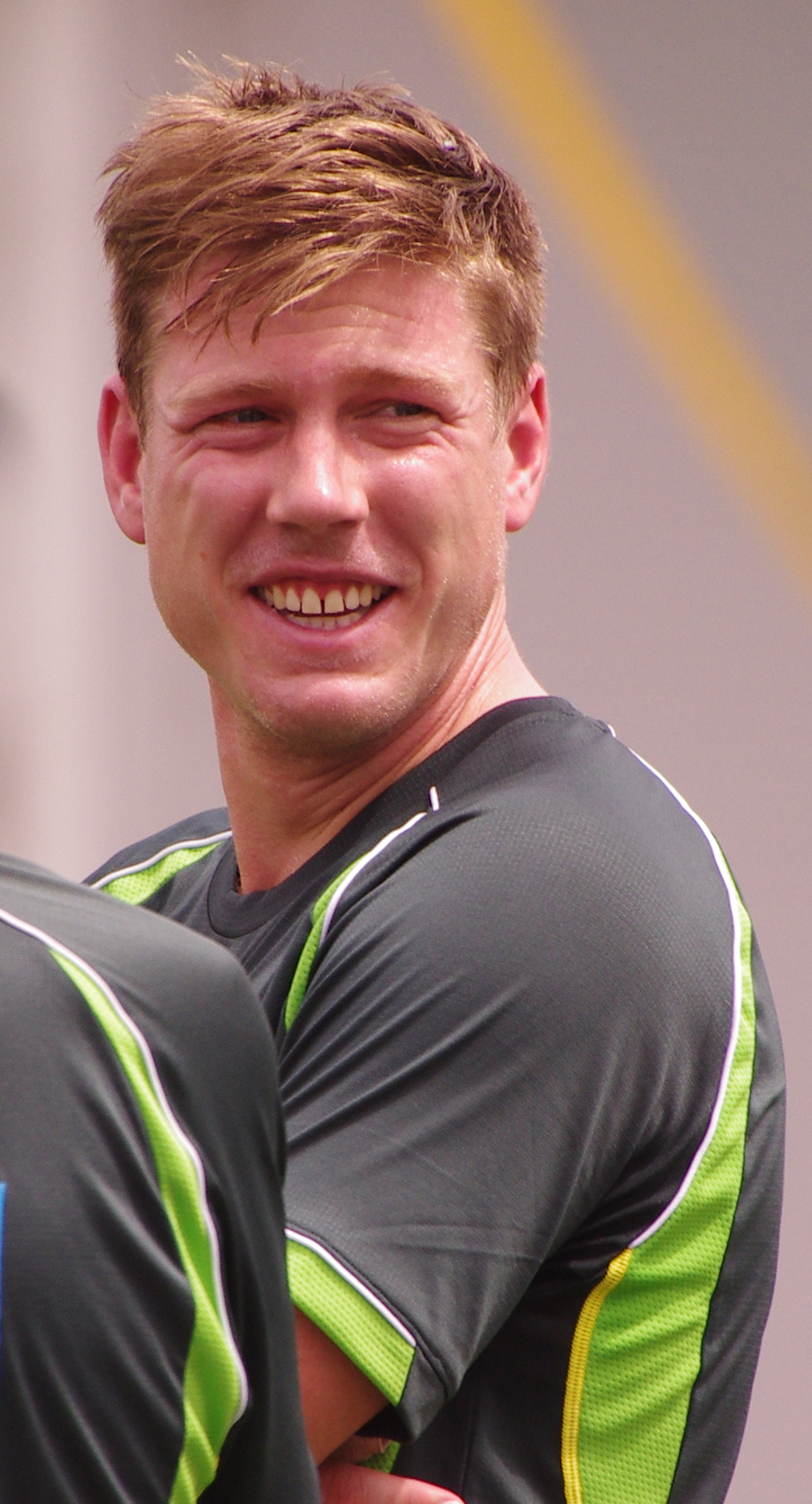
- Faulkner in 2014

Personal information
- Full name: James Peter Faulkner
- Born: 29 April 1990 (age 36); Launceston, Tasmania, Australia
- Height: 186 cm (6 ft 1 in)
- Batting: Right-handed
- Bowling: Left-arm fast-medium
- Role: Bowling all-rounder
- Relatives: Peter Faulkner (father)

International information
- National side: Australia (2012–2017)
- Only Test (cap 435): 21 August 2013 v England
- ODI debut (cap 202): 1 February 2013 v West Indies
- Last ODI: 1 October 2017 v India
- ODI shirt no.: 44
- T20I debut (cap 57): 1 February 2012 v India
- Last T20I: 22 February 2017 v Sri Lanka
- T20I shirt no.: 44

Domestic team information
- Years: Team
- 2008/09–2019/20: Tasmania
- 2011: Pune Warriors India
- 2011/12–2017/18: Melbourne Stars
- 2012: Kings XI Punjab
- 2013–2015: Rajasthan Royals
- 2015, 2018–2019: Lancashire
- 2016–2017: Gujarat Lions
- 2018/19–2020/21: Hobart Hurricanes
- 2021: Lahore Qalandars
- 2022: Quetta Gladiators

Career statistics
Competition	Test	ODI	T20I	FC
Matches	1	69	24	63
Runs scored	45	1,032	159	2,566
Batting average	22.50	34.40	14.45	30.91
100s/50s	0/0	1/4	0/0	2/15
Top score	23	116	41*	121
Balls bowled	166	3,211	515	9,776
Wickets	6	96	36	192
Bowling average	16.33	30.85	19.00	24.78
5 wickets in innings	0	0	1	5
10 wickets in match	0	0	0	0
Best bowling	4/51	4/32	5/27	5/5
Catches/stumpings	0/–	21/–	11/–	26/–
Medal record
Men's Cricket
Representing Australia
ICC Cricket World Cup
Winner	2015 Australia and New Zealand
- Source: ESPNcricinfo, 19 February 2022

James Peter Faulkner (born 29 April 1990) is an Australian former international cricketer who played for the Australian cricket team from 2013 to 2017 and currently in domestic cricket for Tasmania. An all-rounder, Faulkner is known for his aggressive batting in the middle order, and for his bowling at the end of limited-overs innings.

He was a prominent member of the victorious Australian squad at the 2015 Cricket World Cup and was Player of the Match in the tournament final.

== Early life and family ==
Faulkner was born at Launceston, Tasmania in 1990. He is the son of Peter Faulkner, who also played first-class cricket for Tasmania and toured South Africa on the 1985–86 and 1986–87 rebel tours. Although now a pace bowler, Faulkner began his career as a leg-spin bowler. He uses back of the hand and yorker-length cutter deliveries as slower ball variations.

== Domestic career ==
Faulkner captained the Tasmanian under-17 team while already playing in the state's under-19 team and Second XI. He earned a state rookie contract for 2007–08 season and was in the Australian under-19 team at the 2008 ICC Under-19 Cricket World Cup after playing in the Australian Cricket Academy's development squad in 2007.

Faulkner was player of the match in the 2012–13 Sheffield Shield final, helping Tasmania secure their third title. In the Big Bash League Faulkner played for Melbourne Stars between 2011–12 and 2017–18 and more recently for Hobart Hurricanes. He played county cricket in England for Lancashire in 2015 and between 2018 and 2019 and was awarded his county cap in 2019.

Between 2011 and 2017 he played in the Indian Premier League for Pune Warriors, Kings XI Punjab, Rajasthan Royals and Gujarat Lions, taking 28 wickets for Rajasthan in 2013, the third-most wickets in a single IPL season.

In 2021 he played for Lahore Qalandars in the Pakistan Super League (PSL). He was drafted by Quetta Gladiators for the 2022 PSL. In February 2022 he quit the PSL mid-season, accusing the Pakistan Cricket Board (PCB) of not honoring contract terms. In response, the PCB denied all allegations and claimed that he was paid as per his contract. Faulkner threw his bat and his helmet into the chandelier of the PC hotel and threw his kit from the second floor of the hotel after being told he wasn't going to be paid the sum he was asking. Faulkner was subsequently banned from ever participating again in the PSL.

== International career ==
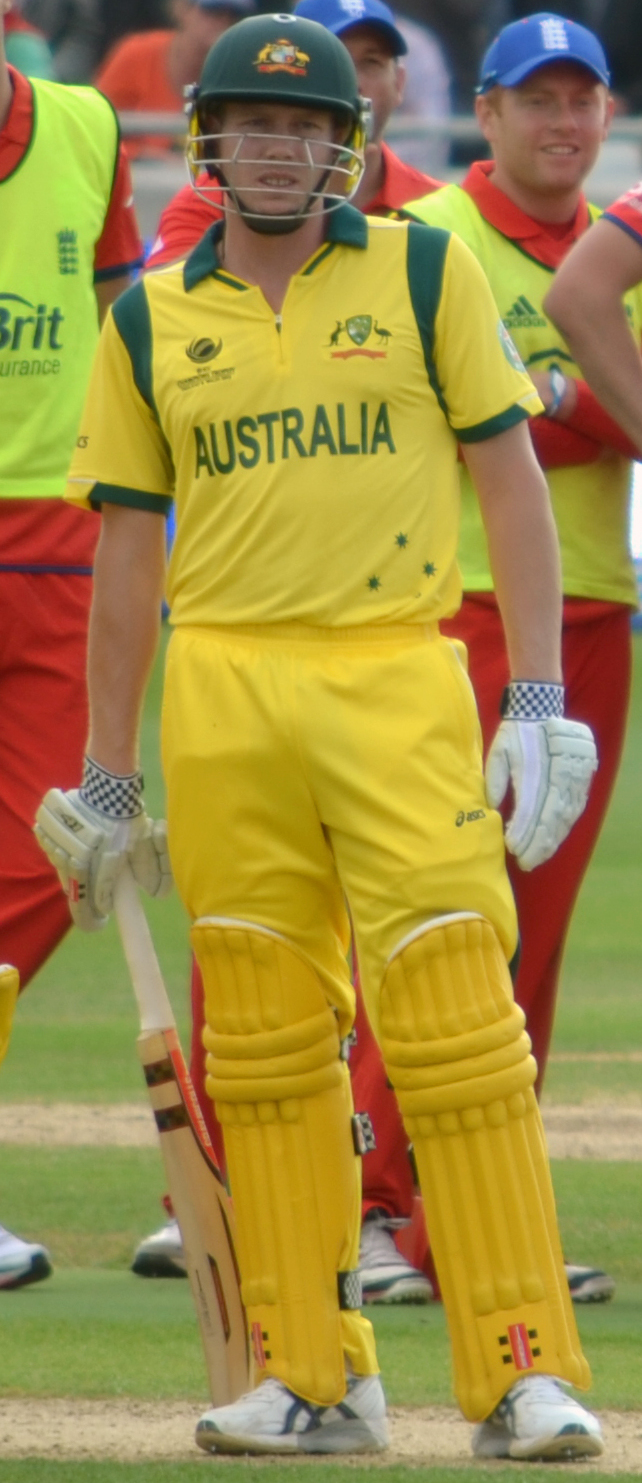
Faulkner during Australia vs England in ICC Champions Trophy 2013

Faulkner made his international debut for Australia in a 2012 Twenty20 International against India. He toured England in 2013 and was selected for the fifth Ashes Test of the tour. Australian selector John Inverarity described Faulkner as the sort of player who "gets things done", while captain Michael Clarke said that Faulkner could provide some toughness that Australian might have lacked in previous matches on the tour.

Throughout 2013, Faulkner went on to establish himself as a regular member of Australia's limited-overs team. In the third One Day International against India in October, he scored 64 runs from 29 balls, including 30 runs off a single Ishant Sharma over, to help win the match for Australia. He scored his maiden One Day International century in November, at the time the second fastest ODI century by an Australian, reaching his hundred from 57 balls.

In the second ODI against England in 2013–14, Faulkner guided Australia to an unlikely victory. Australia was 9/244 and still requiring 57 runs in the last 6 overs, but Faulkner scored 55 of those runs to give Australia victory with three balls to spare. The innings drew comparisons with a famous match-winning innings by Michel Bevan in 1996.

In the 2015 Cricket World Cup Final, Faulkner took three wickets for 36 runs (3/36) and was awarded the Player of the Match as Australia won the competition.

In 2016, during the second ODI against Sri Lanka, Faulkner took a hat-trick, becoming the sixth Australian to do so.
