= Ian Bell =

English cricketer (born 1982)

Ian Bell MBE
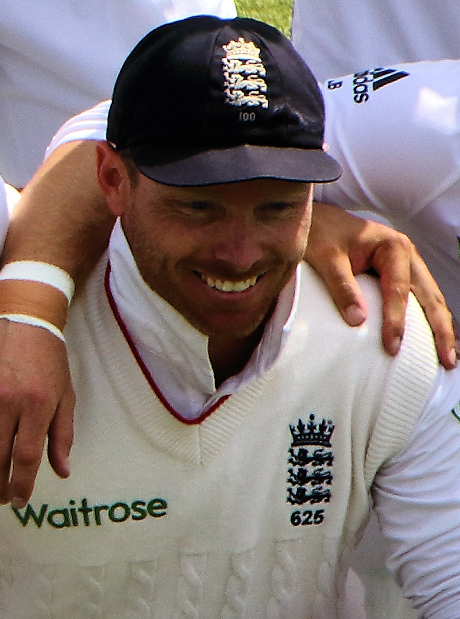
- Bell in August 2015

Personal information
- Full name: Ian Ronald Bell
- Born: 11 April 1982 (age 44); Coventry, West Midlands, England
- Nickname: Boyband, Shermanator, Thand
- Height: 5 ft 9 in (1.75 m)
- Batting: Right-handed
- Bowling: Right-arm medium
- Role: Batsman

International information
- National side: England (2004–2015)
- Test debut (cap 625): 19 August 2004 v West Indies
- Last Test: 1 November 2015 v Pakistan
- ODI debut (cap 184): 28 November 2004 v Zimbabwe
- Last ODI: 13 March 2015 v Afghanistan
- ODI shirt no.: 7
- T20I debut (cap 17): 28 August 2006 v Pakistan
- Last T20I: 20 May 2014 v Sri Lanka
- T20I shirt no.: 7

Domestic team information
- Years: Team
- 1999–2020: Warwickshire (squad no. 4)
- 1999: Warwickshire Cricket Board
- 2016/17: Perth Scorchers (squad no. 12)
- 2018: Dhaka Dynamites (squad no. 7)
- 2019: Islamabad United

Career statistics
Competition	Test	ODI	FC	LA
Matches	118	161	312	318
Runs scored	7,727	5,416	20,440	11,130
Batting average	42.69	37.87	43.58	41.22
100s/50s	22/46	4/35	57/105	13/79
Top score	235	141	262*	158
Balls bowled	108	88	2,875	1,290
Wickets	1	6	47	33
Bowling average	76.00	14.66	34.36	34.48
5 wickets in innings	0	0	0	1
10 wickets in match	0	0	0	0
Best bowling	1/33	3/9	4/4	5/41
Catches/stumpings	100/–	54/–	238/–	109/–
- Source: ESPNcricinfo, 10 September 2020

Ian Ronald Bell MBE (born 11 April 1982) is an English former cricketer who played international cricket in all formats for the England cricket team and county cricket for Warwickshire County Cricket Club. A right-handed higher/middle order batsman, described in The Times as an "exquisite rapier," with a strong cover drive, Bell was also an occasional right-arm medium pace bowler and a slip fielder. He was also noted for his sharp reflexes and often fielded in close catching positions. He scored twenty-two Test centuries and four One Day International (ODI) 100s.

In the 2006 New Year Honours List, Bell was appointed Member of the Order of the British Empire for his role in the successful Ashes campaign of 2005. In November 2006, he was awarded the Emerging Player of the Year award by the International Cricket Council. During 2008 and 2009, he was a more infrequent member of the England teams – however he reclaimed his Test place during the 2009 Ashes, which England won, and featured in several ODIs the following year. During 2010, he captained Warwickshire to victory in the CB40 final before scoring his first Ashes century the following winter as he helped England retain the Ashes down-under. Warwickshire County Cricket Club awarded Bell a benefit in 2011.

In July 2012, Bell signed a new three-year contract with Warwickshire extending his stay at the club at least till 2015. In November 2015, England selectors announced that Bell would be dropped from the English side ahead of the test series with South Africa. In August 2016, it was announced that Bell would be playing for the Perth Scorchers in the 2016–17 Big Bash League season. In August 2018, Bell scored his 20,000th run in first-class cricket. In September 2020, Bell announced his retirement, revealing that his final game for Warwickshire would be a T20 match against Glamorgan.

== Education and early life ==
Bell's family hailed from Dunchurch, near Rugby and he played for the local cricket club as a junior. Bell was educated at Princethorpe College, a Roman Catholic independent school in the nearby village of Princethorpe and made the 1st XI in year 7. He also attended Coventry City's football school of excellence, despite being a supporter of Aston Villa (those two football clubs are traditional rivals), and played for Coventry and North Warwickshire Cricket Club. His brother Keith, born two years later, has played amateur cricket for Staffordshire, and has also played seven games for the Warwickshire Second XI.

== Early career ==
Bell made three appearances for Warwickshire's second team in 1998, his next matches at senior level were with the England Under-19 cricket team on their tour of New Zealand that winter. He made 91 in the first innings of the first Test, and 115 in the first innings of the third; Dayle Hadlee called Bell "the best 16-year-old I've ever seen", and he was often compared with former England captain Mike Atherton. Bell played in several more Under-19 series, captaining the team at home against Sri Lanka in 2000, in their 2000/01 tour of India, and for the first match at home against West Indies in 2001.

By this time Bell had made his first-class debut, appearing in a single match for the Warwickshire first team in September 1999, but was out for a duck in his only innings and played no further part at that level until 2000/01, when he followed on from his Under-19 matches by playing for England A against the Leeward Islands in the Busta Cup tournament game in Anguilla.

Bell broke into the Warwickshire first-team in 2001 as he scored 836 runs in 16 innings including three centuries and two scores of 98. His first century, a score of 130 against Oxford UCCE, made him the county's youngest ever centurion at 19 years and 56 days. He also became the county's youngest capped player ever when Warwickshire awarded him a county cap on the final day of the season.

Bell was named in the first intake of the ECB National Academy who spent the 2001/02 winter in Australia. The day after he returned home from Adelaide he was brought into the full England Test squad to cover for the injured Mark Butcher on the New Zealand tour.

In 2002 Bell's four-day form fell away as he scored 658 at an average of 24.37 however he was instrumental in the county's Benson & Hedges Cup success. He top-scored in the Quarter-final (scoring 85 not out), Semi-final (46) and Final (65 not out), the latter performance winning him the Gold Award in the last ever Benson & Hedges Cup final.

Bell's best form in 2003 once again came in the one-day format, he scored 779 runs at 28.85 in the County Championship compared to 560 runs at 43.07 in the National League, his best performance came at Chelmsford where he scored his maiden one-day century, 125 off 113 deliveries, as well as taking 5/41, his best one-day bowling figures. This was only the second time a Warwickshire player had achieved this feat.

After two poor seasons Bell was back to his best in 2004, he scored 1498 Championship runs which included six centuries. One of the six was a career-best 262 not out against Sussex; the innings lasting ten minutes short of ten hours made him the county's youngest ever double-centurion. In late July he began an impressive sequence of four centuries in five first-class innings, the other being a score of 96 not out. The centuries in both innings against Lancashire were the first by a Warwickshire batsman against an authentic attack (David Hemp achieved the feat against declaration bowling) since Brian Lara in 1994. This run of form led to him being brought into the England Test squad when Graham Thorpe was left doubtful with a finger injury.

== International career ==
=== 2004: West Indies ===
Bell made his international debut in the final match of the Test series against the West Indies at The Oval. He hit 70, batting at number five in England's first innings; he was not required to bat again as England forced the West Indies to follow on and won the game by ten wickets.

=== 2004/05: Zimbabwe and South Africa ===
Bell was selected as part of the squad to tour Zimbabwe and South Africa and he made his One Day International debut alongside Kevin Pietersen against Zimbabwe at Harare. Bell opened the innings and hit 75, which earned him his first ODI man-of-the-match award. He played all four matches of the series averaging 40.75. Although he was not chosen for any of the Tests against South Africa, he was selected for the first four of seven ODI matches but struggled, making 26 runs in three innings.

=== 2005: Bangladesh and The Ashes ===
In 2005, Bell enjoyed a superb start to the season, scoring 480 first-class runs in April alone to break Graeme Hick's 17-year-old record. He was recalled to the England team for the two-Test series against Bangladesh, however England's innings victories in both Tests allowed him only two innings. In the first Test at Lord's, Bell made 65 not out, and in the second at Chester-le-Street he scored 162 not out, in the process becoming the first Englishman since Leslie Ames in 1935 to score over 100 runs before lunch in a Test match.

For the 2005 Ashes series, three players – Bell, Graham Thorpe and Kevin Pietersen – were in the running for two spots in the team, and Bell and Pietersen were preferred to Thorpe. Before the first Test at Lord's, Bell's test average was 297, rising to 303 just before he was out, the sixth highest average at any point of a player's career of all time. Bell failed in the first two matches, at Lord's and Edgbaston, but in the third Test at Old Trafford he overcame early struggles against Shane Warne to post a half-century in each innings. However, he only scored six runs in four innings in the fourth and fifth Tests, including a pair at the Oval, leaving him with a batting average for the series of only 17.10, by far the lowest of the English batsmen. He was appointed Member of the Order of the British Empire in the 2006 New Year Honours. Despite England winning the Ashes back and being appointed MBE, Bell has since described the 2005 Ashes as a low point during which he doubted himself.

=== 2005/06: Pakistan and India ===
Despite failing against Australia, he was included in the 17-man squad for the winter tour of Pakistan. There was speculation in the press that he would not be included in the Test team, but when Michael Vaughan was injured before the first Test, Bell got another opportunity. He took it, scoring a century and two half-centuries in the three-match series, and becoming England's top scorer in the series with 313 runs at an average of 52.16. He also took his only Test wicket with his part-time bowling when he caught and bowled Mohammad Yousuf.

This form on the subcontinent continued on 18 February 2006 in England's first warm-up game prior to the Test series against India when Bell top-scored with 78 at Mumbai. He could not maintain this form into the Test series where, in 6 innings, he only scored 131 runs at an average of just under 22.

=== 2006: Sri Lanka and Pakistan ===
After returning from India, Bell had an average start to the season with Warwickshire. He was named in the squad of 13 for the first home Test of the summer, against Sri Lanka, but with the return of Marcus Trescothick, coupled with the good form of Paul Collingwood and the emergence of Alastair Cook, Bell was dropped from the starting 11. Bell was selected in the squad for the 5 match ODI series against Sri Lanka, and was one of only a couple of players to come through the series with any credit.

As a result of this, and the injury to Andrew Flintoff, Bell was recalled to the Test team for the first Test against Pakistan. After spending most of his career batting in the top four, he was asked to bat at number six. He scored a century in each of the first three Tests, becoming the first Englishman since Graham Gooch to score a century in three successive Test matches, but missed his chance to make it four in a row after scoring only 9 in the first innings and being 9 not out when the fourth Test unexpectedly finished a day early after the Pakistan ball tampering row. He finished the series with an average of 93.75, but surprisingly was not awarded the man-of-the-series award for England, with the honour going to Andrew Strauss who averaged 63.42. This run of form (100*, 28, 106*, 119, 4, 9, 9*) gave him an overall Test average of almost 48. Given his average against Australia was only 17, his average against all other sides was around 68. He also played in the ODI series against Pakistan, achieving his two highest scores at the time: 88 at Sophia Gardens and 86* at Trent Bridge, the latter earning him the man-of-the-match award following England's victory.

=== 2006: Champions Trophy ===
In September 2006 Bell was named in the squad for the Champions Trophy in India and also in the squad to tour Australia to attempt to retain the Ashes. In the absence of Marcus Trescothick he was promoted to open the batting for the one-day side. In England's three matches he scored 97 runs, at an average of 32.33. England lost their first two games (to India and Australia) and crashed out of the tournament despite a final group-stage win over eventual runners-up, West Indies.

=== 2006/07: The Ashes ===
Coming into the Ashes series, with Andrew Flintoff named as captain for the tour and reclaiming his place at number six in the batting order, Bell was viewed as competing with Alastair Cook and Paul Collingwood for two places in the starting eleven. However, because Marcus Trescothick returned to England prior to the first Test, Bell, Cook and Collingwood played in the team throughout the series. Scoring a total of 331 runs, including four half centuries, Bell averaged 33.10 for the series. He failed to convert good starts into big scores, and England suffered a 0 – 5 Test series whitewash. This poor run of results continued into the one-day series: England lost the Twenty20 game and the first of the ODI's. However, England squeaked through into the final of the Commonwealth Bank Series, and dispatched Australia in the finals in two straight games, with Bell scoring 65 in the first of them.

=== World Cup 2007 ===
Bell was selected as part of England's 15-man squad for the world cup in the West Indies. England had a largely disappointing tournament and Bell's performances were typical of the team as a whole. At the start of the tournament he was selected to bat at number three, as England lost to New Zealand and stuttered to wins over Kenya, Canada and Ireland. Bell suffered an average run of form in these matches, scoring 5, 28, 16 and 31. After defeat to eventual runners up, Sri Lanka, a game in which Bell scored 47, England dropped Ed Joyce from the top of the order and Bell was promoted to open with captain Michael Vaughan. The change in position initially worked well as Bell scored 77 as England lost to Australia, but in the next two games, against Bangladesh and South Africa, he only managed scores of 0 and 7, and was dropped for England's final match against the West Indies, a game which England won. England finished fifth in the Super 8 stage of the tournament and failed to qualify for the semi-finals.

=== 2007: West Indies and India ===
Ian Bell scored the fourth of England's hundreds against the West Indies in the first Test at Lord's in May. Along with Alastair Cook, Paul Collingwood and Matt Prior, they became the first four batsmen for England since 1938 to each score a century in the same Test match. Bell's innings came at number 6 in the batting order and after England declared he had the impressive record at that position of 484 runs at 121.00.

On 21 August 2007, Bell scored his maiden ODI century in the first of seven one-day matches against India, scoring 126 runs off 118 balls (a strike rate of 106.8). Bell went on to score two more fifties in the next two games, including a player-of-the-match 79 at Edgbaston as England took a 2–1 lead in the series. Bell eventually averaged 70.33 for the seven games as England claimed the series 4–3, with a convincing 7 wicket win in the deciding match at Lord's, and Bell was named Man of the Series.

=== 2007/08: Sri Lanka ===
Travelling with the team to Sri Lanka in late September 2007, Bell at first continued his impressive one-day form, scoring 131 from only 121 deliveries, in England's only warm-up match against a Sri Lanka Cricket Board XI. However, Bell struggled with the bat in the subsequent 5-game ODI series, scoring just 70 runs at an average of 14.00.

Bell recovered form in the first Test match, scoring 83 and 74, in vain, as England fell to an 88-run defeat. Sri Lanka won the Test series 1–0, after the second and third matches were drawn, and Bell finished the series with a batting average of 43.50.

=== 2007/08: New Zealand ===
Bell initially struggled for form as England opened its five-game ODI series against New Zealand with two heavy defeats, scoring just 5 and 0. However, under pressure for his place in the side, Bell top-scored in England's win in Auckland in the third game of the series with 73 runs, and then made 43 runs from 41 balls as England tied the fourth match, in Napier. Bell managed 24 runs in the final game as New Zealand clinched the series 3–1.

In the first Test match at Hamilton, Bell was hit hard on the wrist during New Zealand's first innings, whilst fielding at short leg. Despite initial fears that his wrist was broken and his tour would be over, the blow turned out to have only caused swelling and bruising. Bell went on to score 25 in England's first innings and top scored in the second innings with an unbeaten 54 as England crumbled to 110 all out and lost the match by 189 runs, the next highest score in the innings being 13 by Alastair Cook. In the second Test, Bell scored 11 and 41 as England won the match to level the series. His finest innings of the tour was in the final Test. After scoring 9 in the first innings, Bell was under some pressure to post a big score. He joined Andrew Strauss at the crease with England 140/3 and the pair proceeded to put on 187 runs and effectively put the match beyond New Zealand. In the process, Bell scored his seventh Test century, and his first overseas for more than two years. He finished the series with a batting average of 50.00, and became the second youngest England player to reach 2,500 runs.

Bell struggled in the home Test series, however, scoring only 45 runs in four innings, with a high score of 21*. He hit some form in the Twenty20 match that followed, top scoring with his highest score in that format, 60*, as England won by nine wickets. He then adopted the opening position for the following ODI series, however his form was intermittent with scores of 46, 0, 20, and 46.

=== 2008: South Africa, India and West Indies ===
Bell started off this series against South Africa by hitting 199 before being dismissed by Paul Harris, one short of his maiden double century, thus becoming the first Englishman to be dismissed on 199. After the initial good start to the tour though, Bell struggled to find form and aside from a 50 in the first innings of the third Test. he did not manage to progress much past the twenties and thirties. He finished the series with 332 at an average of 47.42. In the 5-match ODI series that followed, he made 149 runs at 49.66 with a top score of 73 in the third ODI at The Oval.

On the tour of India in late 2008, Bell made 84 runs across four ODIs. He struggled in the first Test against India, making scores of 17 and seven as England lost the first Test match by 6 wickets. The second Test finished in a draw, although Bell again failed to make a substantial score, being dismissed for just one in the first innings before finishing the second innings on 24 not out.

He suffered similarly in India and the West Indies, and following England's dismissal for 51 in the First Test, in which Bell made just four runs, he was dropped in favour of Owais Shah.

=== 2009: The Ashes ===
Bell reacted well to being dropped and began to consistently score runs in the county championship that led to him being named in the 16-man training party for the tests against Australia and captain of the England Lions for their game against Australia, though he failed in that match, scoring 0 (a golden duck) and 20, and remained on the sidelines for the first two Tests of the series.

Bell was selected to play in the third Test at Edgbaston, his home ground, replacing the injured Kevin Pietersen. On his return to the Test side and batting at number three, he scored 53 in England's only innings in a drawn match. The 4th Test Match at Headingley, in which he was twice dismissed edging Mitchell Johnson for scores of eight and three gave Bell his part of a Test record – for the first time in the history of Test cricket the same middle order, three (Ravi Bopara), four (Bell) and five (Paul Collingwood), all failed to reach double figures in either innings, contributing 16 runs between them.

Nonetheless, Bell made 126 against Nottinghamshire at Trent Bridge the next week. He was then selected to play in the final Test at The Oval, and scored 72 to lay a foundation for England's 172-run first-innings lead. Though he was dismissed for four in the second innings, a debut century from Warwickshire colleague Jonathan Trott led England to a 197-run victory, and thus a 2–1 series victory in the Ashes. Bell was dismissed by Mitchell Johnson four times in his five innings in the series, and had scored 140 runs at an average of only 28, though with two half centuries.

=== 2009/10: South Africa and Bangladesh ===
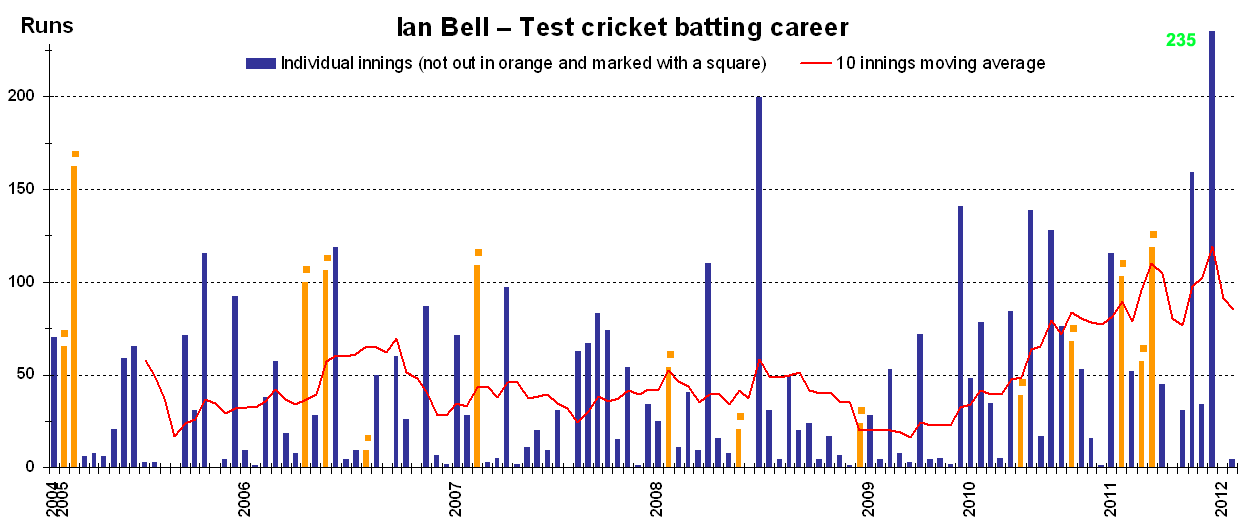
Bars show individual innings in Bell's Test career, with a ten innings moving average shown as a red line – note the substantial increase over the two-year period from the end of 2009.

After a poor first Test for England which ended in a draw at Centurion, Bell, with scores of 5 and 2, Bell's place in the team was under fire. England Team Director Andy Flower gave Bell a vote of confidence and the response from Bell was his first Test match century since his 199 vs South Africa in July 2008. In the second Test at Durban, Bell scored 141 runs in the first innings to hush his critics – prior to this innings his Test batting average had fallen to 38.9. The final two tests were modest for Bell, who scored 166 runs in 4 innings at an average of 41.50. However, the series marked the beginning of a period of substantial batting achievement for Bell. Less than two years later his average would stand at 49.29; the figure at right shows that over the same period his ten innings moving average rose from 32 to 119 runs.

On the tour of Bangladesh, Bell scored a quick and confident 84 off 105 balls in England's first innings of the first Test at Chittagong, and scored 39 not out in the second innings. By batting lower down the order, typically at 6, Bell has seen his scores improve and he has scored five of his ten Test centuries whilst batting at 6. In the second test at Mirpur, with England struggling for momentum on 107–3, Bell came to the crease at number 5 making crucial partnerships with Jonathan Trott (67 run partnership), Matt Prior (98 run partnership) and a 143-run stand with Tim Bresnan for the 6th wicket on his way towards his 10th Test match century, finally being dismissed for 138. During his century, Bell's average against Bangladesh touched 488, the highest any batsman has had against a particular country in the history of Test cricket.

=== 2010: Bangladesh and injury absence ===
Bell featured in the home Test series with Bangladesh at the start of the season, scoring a century in the second Test. However, a broken metatarsal sustained in the subsequent one-day series ruled him out of the summer's main series against Pakistan. He did return to action for his county Warwickshire towards the end of the season, scoring a match-winning century as acting captain in the CB40 final against Somerset.

=== 2010/11: Ashes in Australia ===
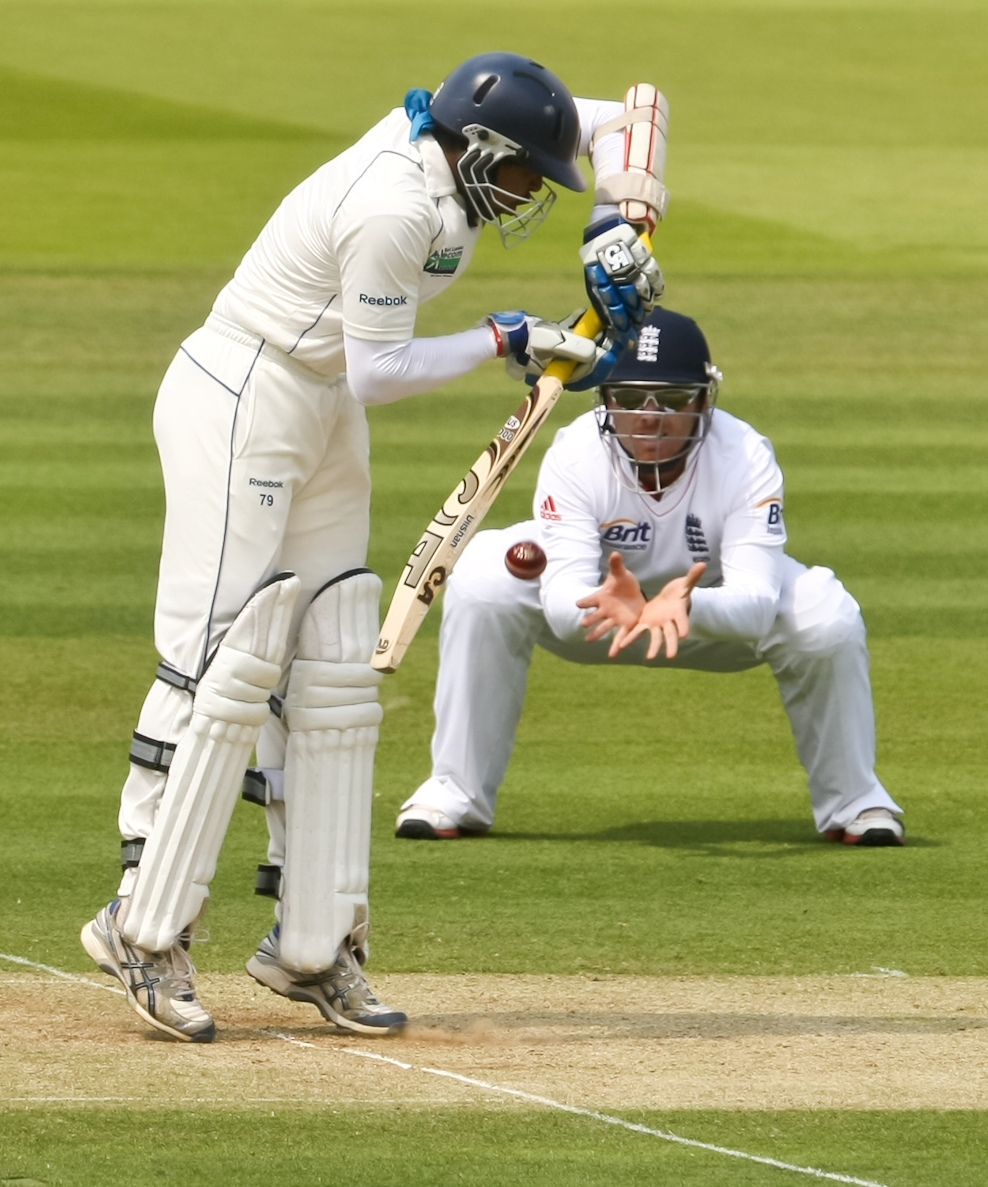
Ian Bell fielding during a Test against Sri Lanka in 2011

By the time the Ashes came around, Bell had a regular place at No. 6 in the team. Throughout the series there were talks of a possible leap up the order, in front of an out-of-form Paul Collingwood. He started off the series well, and progressed throughout the series with many elegant drives, cuts and pulls. However it was not until the 5th Test in Sydney that he could score his first Ashes century after eleven 50s. Bell was one of England's finest with the bat, and helped to contribute to a 3–1 series victory, England's first in Australia since Mike Gatting's men in 1986/87.

=== 2011: Cricket World Cup ===
In the February and March Bangladesh, India, and Sri Lanka hosted the 2011 World Cup. In England's first match they successfully chased a high total by Netherlands, with Bell contributing 33 runs. Next England played India, put up a challenging total of 338. Bell and his captain Strauss set about consolidating England's position, while Bell survived a lbw decision off the bowling of left-arm spinner Yuvraj Singh. Opposition captain Mahendra Singh Dhoni asked for a review. TV replays and Hawk-Eye showed that Bell was indeed plumb. However, since there was a rule wherein the on-field umpire (Billy Bowden here) can have the final decision if the batsman was 2.5 metres forward from the stumps, the umpire stood by his 'not out' decision. Bell went on to make 69 runs and almost helped England win comfortably. This match eventually ended in a tie.

=== 2011: India ===
During the 2011 summer, Bell was an integral part of the team that inflicted a 4 – 0 Test whitewash over the Indian cricket team in friendly home conditions and seaming pitches, helping England to become the number 1 team in the world for the first time since the ICC ranking came into existence. Bell was involved in a controversial run out during the series. Believing the ball to be dead after reaching the boundary, Bell left the middle to head in for tea, however the ball had not actually crossed the boundary and was promptly thrown in by the fielder and the bails taken off. Initially given out, the Indians retracted their appeal at tea and Bell returned to carry on his innings straight after. Bell scored his first double ton in the series, a test best of 235. For taking this decision the Indian captain, Mahendra Singh Dhoni, won the 'Spirit of the cricket' award at the 2011 ICC Awards.

His innings of 159 against India at Nottingham was nominated to be one of the best Test batting performance of the year 2011 by ESPNcricinfo. For his performances in 2011, he was named in the World Test XI by ESPNcricinfo.

=== 2012: Pakistan, Sri Lanka and West Indies ===
In February, the English Team was whitewashed by Pakistan in the UAE, Bell scored just 51 runs in six innings as the English batsmen were exposed off their Spin technique, particularly picking Saeed Ajmal's doosra. In the first game in Dubai, Bell was dismissed for a duck in the first innings, followed by making just four in the second. In the first innings of the second Test he scored 29, his highest score in the series, but was unable to make an impact in the second innings as England were bowled out for 72 to go 2–0 down in the series. England lost the final game of the series by 71 runs, with. Bell again failing to make an impact.

Bell made 52 in the first innings against Sri Lanka but England went on to lose the game by 75 runs, their fourth straight Test defeat. This meant that England had to win the next game to keep hold of their Number One Test ranking. They went on to do so, winning the match by an innings. Bell made 18 in the first innings and was not required to bat again.

In the first Test against the West Indies. Bell returned to form in his favoured English conditions, hitting scores of 61 and 63 not out. In the third and final test of the series, Bell made 73 not out to help secure a draw for England which meant that they won the series. Bell was named in the 14 member squad for the three-match NatWest ODI series against West Indies starting on 16 June at Southampton. Bell would be the opening partner of Cook in the ODI series. He scored his second one-day hundred as England won the first match of the series. His innings was nominated to be one of the best ODI batting performances of the year by ESPNcricinfo. He continued his good form in the next match, hitting 53 as England won by eight wickets.

=== 2012–13: India ===
Ian Bell started off rather ordinarily in this tour, as he struggled against the Indian spinners on slow spinning and dry pitches. In the first tour match at Brabourne Stadium at Mumbai, he scored just 5 against India A before being dismissed by Yuvraj Singh. He followed it up with a 4 & 28* against Mumbai A. He scored 0 & 22, 5 & 28* in the first two tests. In the 4th test at Nagpur, he scored 1 & 116* (from 306 balls). This unbeaten century on the spinning, dry pitch ensured a stale draw on the 4th Test to win the series 2–1. Then in January 2013, he scored 91 (from 89 balls) in the Palam A Ground at Delhi against India A before being dismissed by Mohit Sharma. However, it was in a losing cause as they lost by 53 runs in Duckworth-Lewis method. Two days later, he scored 108 against Delhi cricket team (dismissed by leg spinner Varun Sood), yet again in a losing cause.

Bell scores a century during the 2013 Lord's Test with a push to point

=== 2013: The Ashes ===
In the first innings of the first Test of the series at Trent Bridge in Nottingham, Bell scored 25 runs from 63 balls but was caught by Shane Watson from the bowling off Peter Siddle in the first innings as England were bowled out for just 215. In the second innings, Bell top scored for England with 109 runs. His seventh wicket partnership of 138 with Stuart Broad helped England to a lead of 311. England went on to win by 14 runs.

In England's first innings of the second Test at Lords, Ian Bell rescued England from a precarious position of 28–3 by building a 99-run partnership with fellow Warwickshire teammate Jonathan Trott. After Trott fell on 58, Bell built a steady partnership with Jonny Bairstow and reached his 19th Test century. He eventually fell for 109. This was also his third consecutive Ashes century, after scoring his first in the previous Ashes series at the Sydney Cricket Ground, his second in the First Test at Trent Bridge, and his third at Lords. In the second innings of the second Ashes Test at Lord's, Bell hit 74 in a partnership with Joe Root. He scored quickly showing a range of shots as they were building a large lead over Australia. He was caught at mid-wicket off Steve Smith. He was awarded the man of the series award at the end of the series.

He was also named in the Test XI by ESPNcricinfo for 2013.

=== 2013–14: Ashes and New Zealand ===
Bell made scores of 5 and 32 in the first test in Brisbane, but England lost the match. He made his highest score of the series, 72 in the second Test, which England again lost by a big margin as Australia went 2–0 in the series. The series was lost after just three games when Australia took a 3–0, lead with Bell making scores of 15 and 60. Bell did not make a half century again in the series as England tour began to fall apart after losing the Ashes. He made 27 runs in the fourth Test, which included a duck, before making just 18 runs in the final Test as Australia won the series 5–0. Senior batsmen such as Bell, Cook and Pietersen were criticised in the English media for their lack of runs, with Bell himself making just two half centuries and failing to score a hundred in the series. Bell showed good form in the opening two ODIs, making a score of 41 in the first match before being run out for 68 in the second. Despite this, England went on to lose both matches. In the third ODI Bell made 29 before being run out for the second consecutive match. England won their only game of the tour in the fourth ODI, with Bell making 55. He made 14 in the final match as Australia won the series 4–1.

He played in the drawn three test series in New Zealand in March 2013, scoring an obdurate 75 in the last test at Auckland to help England to secure a draw similar to that at Cardiff against Australia in 2009.

=== 2014: Sri Lanka and India ===
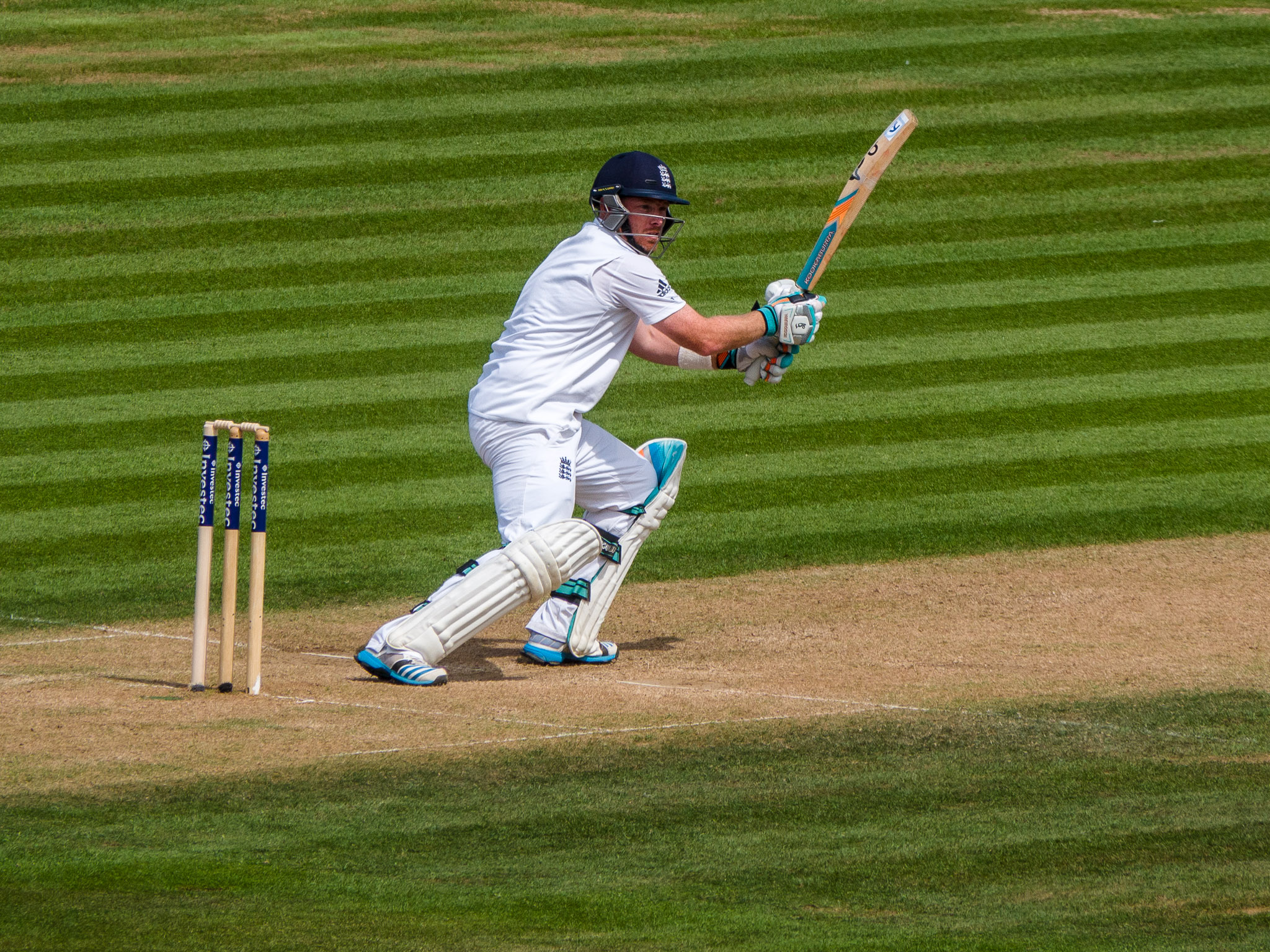
Bell batting against India in Southampton in 2014.

Bell was named in the ODI squad for their series against Sri Lanka. He made 50 in the first match of the series as England won by 81 runs on the DL Method. He made 12 in the following match, before hitting an unbeaten 41 in the third match of the series to help England to a ten wicket victory. England lost the final two matches of the series, with Bell making scores of seven and 37 in the next too matches. The two defeats meant that England lost the series 3–2. In the First test, Bell made scores of 56 and 9 as the match ended in a draw. The second and final Test of the series was Bell's 100 Test match. He made 64 in the first innings to help England into a strong position, before making just eight in England's second innings as they collapsed to lose the match.

In the first Test against India Bell made 25 as the match finished in a draw due to a pitch that gave the bowlers little. He was poor in the second Test, making scores of 16 and 1 as England lost the match to go 1–0 down in the series. Seniors players such as Bell and Alistair Cook came under scrutiny, although retained their places in the squad for the next Test. On 28 July in the third test against India at The Rose Bowl, Southampton, Bell scored a century in the first innings by hitting a six against Ravindra Jadeja when he was at 94 not out. In that over 21 runs of six balls came with Bell scoring 20 with two sixes and two fours. It was Bell's 21st century and first after the previous Ashes series. He went on to score 167, falling to a ball from Bhuvneshwar Kumar. England eventually went on to win the match by 266 runs and level the series. Bell continued his good form, making 58 in the next match to help England take a 2–1 lead in the series. Bell only made seven in the final match of the series, but due to poor batting from India England clinched the series 3–1. After the first ODI was rained off, Bell opened in the second match of the series, although he made just one as England lost the game. Bell made 28 in the next match as England suffered another defeat. A foot injury suffered in training ruled bell out for the rest of the series.

Bell was selected for the tour of Sri Lanka at the back end of 2014. However, he only played in the first two matches, making scores of 35 and 11. England lost both games.

=== 2015: Tri Series ===
Following the removal of Alistair Cook as ODI captain, Bell returned to the top of the order for the tournament against Australia and India. He was out for a duck in the first match against Australia as England lost the opening match. He hit 88 not out in the following match against India to help England win the match. In the following game, he hit 141 against Australia, but it was not enough to prevent another England defeat. In the next game against India he made ten as England qualified for the final. Bell was unable to make an impact in the final, being dismissed for eight as England again lost to Australia.

=== 2015: West Indies and New Zealand ===
Bell was selected in the England squad that toured the West Indies. He made 143 in the first innings of the first Test, but was dismissed for 11 in the second innings after being run out. The match ended in a draw. Bell could only make 1 in England's first innings of the second Test. However, England went on to win the game to take a 1–0 lead in the series. Bell had a poor game in the final match of the series after being dismissed for a duck in both innings. England went on to lose the game by five wickets as the West Indies fought back to level the series at 1–1.

Bell enjoyed a disappointing time in the series against New Zealand. He made just one in the first innings and then followed this up with 29 in the second innings. Despite this, England went on to win the match by 124 runs. Bell's poor form continued in the next Test as he made scores of 12 and one as England lost the game to draw the series 1–1. Bell also dropped several catches in the second Test.

=== 2015: The Ashes ===
In the first Ashes Test Bell could only make 1 in the first innings, although he then made 60 in the second innings as England won the match convincingly. In the second Test Bell struggled and made just 12 runs in the match as England lost by 405 runs. Following the defeat, Bell was moved up the order to three and responded well in the Third Test, scoring 53 in the first innings and an unbeaten 65 in the second innings as England won by eight wickets. Bell made just 1 in the fourth Test as England won by an innings and 78 runs to win the series. In the final Test, he made ten in the first innings and 13 in the second as England lost by an innings and 48 runs, but won the series 3–2.

Ian Bell officially declared his retirement from ODI cricket, so he could focus on Test cricket.

=== 2015: Pakistan ===
Despite coming under pressure, Bell kept his place for the tour of Pakistan. He scored 63 in England's first innings of the first Test, as they posted 598/9. He made an unbeaten five in the second innings but England were unable to force a victory. He was out for four in the first innings of the second Test, but improved in the second innings, scoring 46. Despite this, England suffered a defeat by a margin of 78 runs. Bell made 40 in England's first innings of the final Test match, as they took a first innings lead. However, he was dismissed for a duck in the second innings as England were bowled out for 156 to lose the match and the series 2–0.

=== 2020: Retirement ===
On September 6, 2020, Bell announced his retirement from all forms of cricket at the end of 2020 Northern summer.

== Coaching career ==
Since his retirement from playing, Bell has been active as a coach working with Derbyshire, New Zealand and England Under-19s as well as in the Big Bash League, T10 League and The Hundred.

In August 2024 he was appointed as Sri Lanka's batting coach for their three-Test series against England.

== Career records and statistics ==
=== Test matches ===
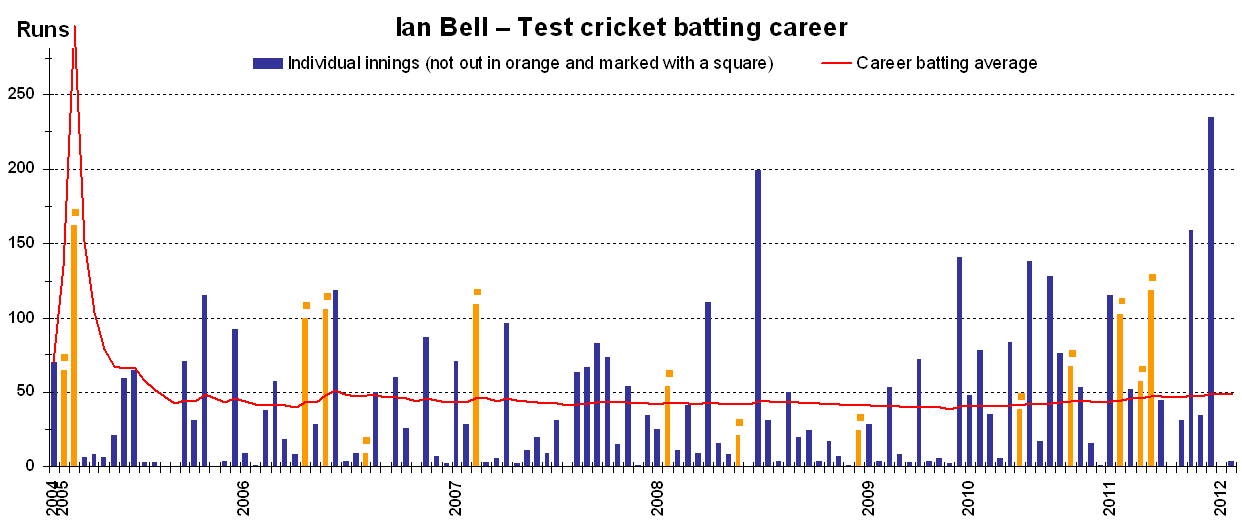
An innings-by-innings breakdown of Bell's Test match batting career, current as at 22 January 2012, showing runs scored (blue and orange bars) and his career batting average (red line). An alternative image is available showing a 10 innings moving average - This graph also shows the peak of the average progression line, when he achieved an average of 297

Career performance

		Batting				Bowling			
Opposition	Matches	Runs	Average	High score	100 / 50	Runs	Wickets	Average	Best
Australia	28	1,768	36.83	115	4/15	32	0	–	–
Bangladesh	6	633	105.5	162*	3/2	–	–	–	–
India	20	1,343	41.96	235	4/4	2	0	–	–
New Zealand	11	521	32.56	110	1/2	–	–	–	–
Pakistan	10	739	46.18	119	4/2	42	1	42.00	1/33
South Africa	11	789	41.52	199	2/4	–	–	–	–
Sri Lanka	10	812	58.00	119*	2/8	–	–	–	–
West Indies	9	551	55.10	109*	1/5	–	–	–	–
Overall	105	7,156	45.00	235	21/42	76	1	76.00	1/33

=== One Day Internationals ===
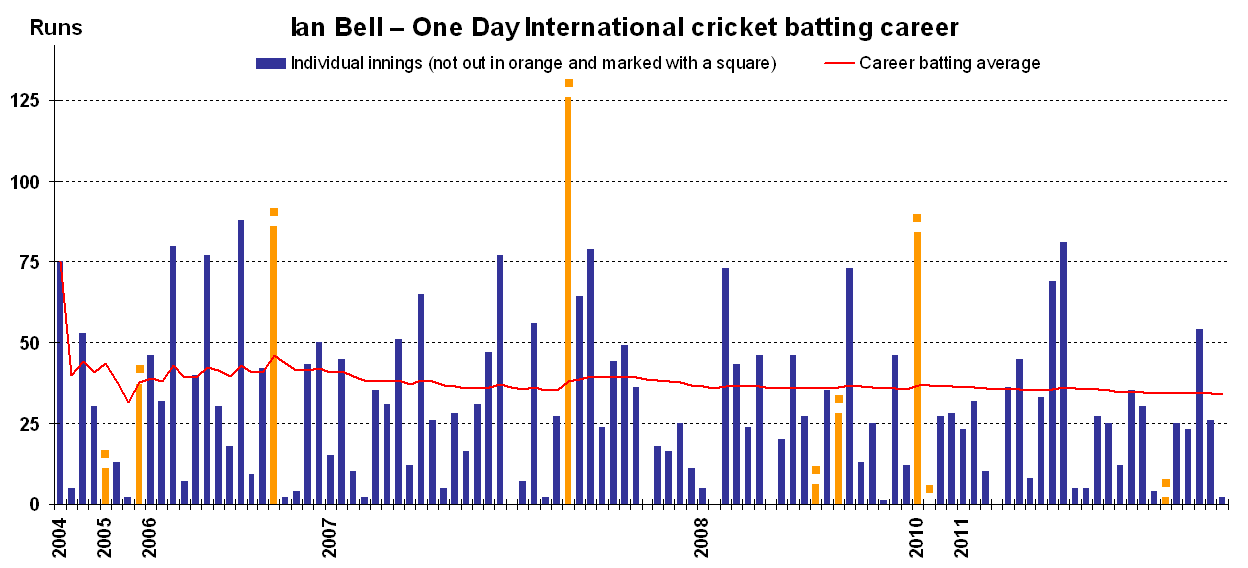
An innings-by-innings breakdown of Bell's ODI batting career, current as at 23 January 2012, showing runs scored (blue and orange bars) and his career batting average (red line) - An alternative image is available showing a 10 innings moving average

Career performance

		Batting				Bowling			
Opposition	Matches	Runs	Average	High score	100 / 50	Runs	Wickets	Average	Best
Australia	25	963	38.52	91	0/8	–	–	–	–
Bangladesh	4	89	44.50	84*	0/1	–	–	–	–
Canada	1	28	28.00	28	0/0	–	–	–	–
India	27	1,036	43.16	126*	2/5	–	–	–	–
Ireland	3	192	64.00	81	0/2	39	2	19.50	2/39
Kenya	1	16	16.00	16	0/0	–	–	–	–
Netherlands	1	33	33.00	33	0/0	–	–	–	–
New Zealand	22	646	29.36	82	0/2	–	–	–	–
Pakistan	9	319	53.16	88	0/2	10	0	–	–
Scotland	2	56	56.00	50	0/1	–	–	–	–
South Africa	17	388	32.33	88	0/2	–	–	–	–
Sri Lanka	23	562	26.76	77	0/2	30	1	30	1/13
West Indies	7	341	48.71	126	1/3	–	–	–	–
Zimbabwe	4	163	40.75	75	0/2	9	3	3.00	3/9
Overall	146	4,832	37.16	126*	3/31	88	6	14.66	3/9

=== International recognition ===
- ICC Emerging Player of the Year: 2006

== Personal life ==
Bell married wife Chantal in 2011. They honeymooned in the Maldives. He is a football fan and an Aston Villa supporter and can be seen regularly watching matches at Villa Park.

Preceded by Kevin Pietersen	ICC Emerging Player of the Year; 2006	Succeeded by Shaun Tait
