= Peter Siddle =

Australian cricketer

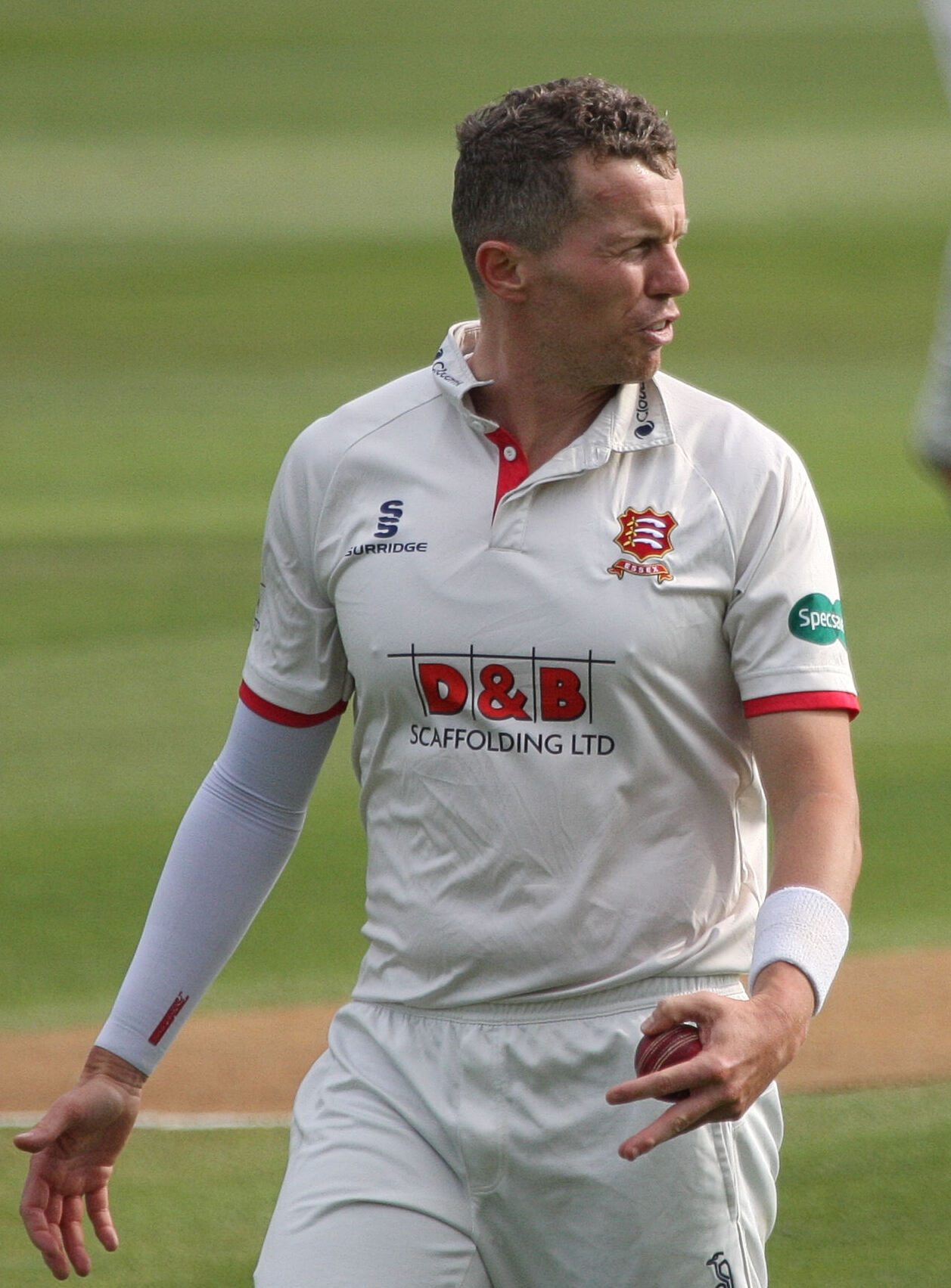
- Siddle playing for Essex in 2019

Personal information
- Full name: Peter Matthew Siddle
- Born: 25 November 1984 (age 41); Morwell, Victoria, Australia
- Nickname: Sidds, Sid Vicious
- Height: 187 cm (6 ft 2 in)
- Batting: Right-handed
- Bowling: Right-arm fast-medium
- Role: Bowler

International information
- National side: Australia (2008–2019)
- Test debut (cap 403): 17 October 2008 v India
- Last Test: 12 September 2019 v England
- ODI debut (cap 172): 13 February 2009 v New Zealand
- Last ODI: 18 January 2019 v India
- T20I debut (cap 35): 15 February 2009 v New Zealand
- Last T20I: 31 October 2010 v Sri Lanka

Domestic team information
- Years: Team
- 2005/06–2019/20: Victoria
- 2013/14–2014/15: Melbourne Renegades
- 2014: Nottinghamshire
- 2015: Lancashire
- 2017/18–2022/23: Adelaide Strikers (squad no. 64)
- 2018–2021: Essex (squad no. 64)
- 2020/21–2022/23: Tasmania
- 2022–2023: Somerset (squad no. 64)
- 2023/24–2024/25: Victoria
- 2023/24: Melbourne Renegades
- 2024: Durham
- 2024/25-present: Melbourne Stars
- 2026: Multan Sultans

Career statistics
Competition	Test	ODI	FC	LA
Matches	67	20	231	86
Runs scored	1,164	31	3,990	315
Batting average	14.73	10.33	16.08	10.50
100s/50s	0/2	0/0	1/6	0/1
Top score	51	10*	103*	62
Balls bowled	13,907	901	44,241	4,224
Wickets	221	17	792	111
Bowling average	30.66	43.70	26.20	30.54
5 wickets in innings	8	0	27	1
10 wickets in match	0	0	0	0
Best bowling	6/54	3/55	8/54	5/49
Catches/stumpings	19/–	1/–	66/–	8/–
- Source: ESPNcricinfo, 2 April 2025

Peter Matthew Siddle (born 25 November 1984) is an Australian cricketer. He is a specialist right-arm fast-medium bowler who played mostly for Victoria in first-class and List A cricket, then also spent two seasons at Tasmania. In the Big Bash League, he was a foundation member of the Melbourne Stars, although he never played a game for them. He then had a short stint for cross town rivals the Melbourne Renegades, before a significant stint with the Adelaide Strikers. Siddle returned to play for the Renegades in the 2023-24 season. Since the 2024-25 BBL, Siddle has been playing with the Stars. He played Test cricket for Australia over an eight-year period from 2008 to 2016, before being recalled for the Test series against Pakistan in 2018. He retired from international cricket in December 2019. Siddle was part of the winning Australia team in the 2009 ICC Champions Trophy.

Early in Siddle's career he faced multiple injury setbacks, but was able overcome them in 2009 to be named the ICC Emerging Player of the Year. Though injuries continued to plague him throughout his career, he rose to prominence in the 2010–11 Ashes series when he became the ninth Australian to take a Test hat-trick, and the first Australian since Shane Warne in 1994–95 to do so in an Ashes test. He was also the first player in cricket history to take a hat-trick on his birthday. He remained a regular fixture in Australia's team until his bowling pace started to drop in 2014, with Australia's selectors beginning to focus on younger, faster bowlers.

Siddle became a vegan in 2012, subsequently receiving criticism that suggested his diet had a negative effect on his performance, which he disputed. He announced his international retirement on 29 December 2019, effective immediately.

== Early life and career ==
Siddle was born in Traralgon, Victoria and grew up in nearby Morwell in the Gippsland region. Originally a competitive woodchopper, he began playing cricket at the age of 14 for the Latrobe Cricket Club. As a teenager he experienced success, taking 11/47 in a state match at under-17 level. It was in that match that Siddle broke the Victorian state record set by John Scholes.

In 2003, Siddle attended the Australian Cricket Academy and made his first-class debut playing for Victoria against a touring West Indian team at the Melbourne Cricket Ground in November 2005. In 2006, he attended the academy again and was offered a full contract with the Victorian Bushrangers for the 2006–07 season. Shoulder injuries began to hamper Siddle, with a shoulder reconstruction sidelining him for most of the 2006–07 season and further problems interrupting the 2007–08 season. Despite his injury problems, he made himself an important part of Victoria's bowling attack, returning figures of 6/57 in an innings against South Australia, and taking nine wickets in Victoria's Pura Cup final loss to New South Wales. Siddle required a second shoulder reconstruction at the end of the season and, despite missing more than half of the season due to shoulder injuries, took 33 wickets at an average of 15.75 to attract attention from national selectors.

== Test career (2008–2019) ==
=== Emerging Player of the Year (2008–2009) ===
After touring India with Australia A, Siddle was named in the national 15-man squad for the four-Test tour of India on 12 September 2008, as back up to established bowlers Brett Lee, Stuart Clark and Mitchell Johnson. When Clark injured his elbow prior to the second Test, Siddle was selected in the match squad. He made his Test debut at the Punjab Cricket Association Stadium in Mohali on 16 October 2008. His first ball was a bouncer which hit Indian batsman Gautam Gambhir in the head, before taking his maiden Test wicket, that of Sachin Tendulkar. He picked up figures of 3/114 in the first innings, and finished the match with figures of 4/176.

Siddle lost his position in the team when Clark recovered, but regained his position in the team for the first Test against South Africa at the WACA due to Clark's elbow injury recurring. Siddle then solidified his place in the team during Australia's back-to-back series against South Africa. He broke through with three wickets in front of his home crowd at the Melbourne Cricket Ground during the Boxing Day Test Match against the Proteas on his way to figures of four for 81 in the first innings. Siddle backed this performance up in the next Test at the Sydney Cricket Ground, taking five for 59 in South Africa's first innings. His efforts were not enough, however, to prevent Australia from succumbing to a historic home series defeat.

Siddle also gave a fine account of himself on the South African leg of the rubber, in which the Australians triumphed 2–1. Going into the 2009 Ashes series, he had notched up 29 Test wickets at an average of 27.65. The fact that it had come in six Tests against the South Africans and one against India in India, with an economy rate of only 2.57 an over, helped make his record look even more impressive.

In the first Test of the Ashes series against England, Siddle took 2/97 on the first day's play. Siddle then took 5/21 on the first day of the fourth Test, which, to that point, were his career best bowling figures in an innings in Test cricket. After the Ashes, Siddle was named the ICC Emerging Player of the Year for 2009.

=== Hat-trick and injury problems (2009–2013) ===
Siddle had a relatively quiet 2009–10 season before a back stress fracture ruled him out of cricket in January 2010. Siddle was able to recover from the injury in time for the 2010–11 Ashes series in Australia the next summer.

In his first Test match back, on 25 November 2010, Siddle's 26th birthday, he became the ninth Australian to take a Test hat-trick, and first cricketer to take a hat-trick on his birthday. Siddle had been controversially brought into the Australian team ahead of Doug Bollinger, despite not having played since January, but he proved doubters wrong early in the match by taking the key wickets of Kevin Pietersen and Paul Collingwood early in England's first innings. When England reached 4/197, Siddle was brought back into the attack and ended up taking the wickets of Alastair Cook and Matt Prior in consecutive balls to be on a hat-trick. Stuart Broad came to the crease for the hat-trick ball, for which Siddle bowled a yorker. Broad attempted to tap the ball down the leg side but missed the ball with his bat, with the ball hitting his foot and was given out lbw. Broad referred the decision to the third umpire, but the wicket was not overturned. Siddle went on to dismiss Graeme Swann for his sixth wicket of the innings, and could have had a seventh when wicket-keeper Brad Haddin dropped James Anderson off Siddle's bowling. He finished with figures of six wickets for only 54 runs, his best-ever in Test match cricket, having bowled 16 overs in total.

Despite a heavy series defeat to England, Siddle had another successful match in the Boxing Day Test Match at the Melbourne Cricket Ground, taking 6/75 in an innings defeat. Siddle started to enjoy more consistent success, starring against India the next summer with 23 wickets at an average of 18.65. During the series, he took his 100th Test wicket at the SCG on 3 January 2012, to rise to a career-high seventh in the ICC's Test bowler rankings. In the final match of the series he took impressive innings bowling figures of 5/49 on a batting wicket at the Adelaide Oval, even being on a hat-trick at one stage in the match. For this performance he was named the man of the match.

During Australia's tour of the West Indies in early 2012, Siddle suffered another back injury and had to fly home early from the tour. Siddle had signed for English county club Essex, for the 2012 FriendsLife T20, England's premier Twenty20 competition, but due to his injury he was unable to fulfill his contract with the club. Siddle returned to the Australian Test team for their series against South Africa at the end of 2012. Whilst out injured, he decided to become a vegetarian. The series was very difficult for Siddle because of the very heavy workload he faced. In the first Test of the series at the Gabba, he was forced to bowl 53 overs in a draw. Siddle was forced to bowl for a long time again in the second Test at the Adelaide Oval, he bowled 63.5 overs — the most by any Australian fast bowler in a single Test match in the 21st century — as his workload had been compounded by an injury to teammate James Pattinson mid-match. Australia needed to bowl South Africa out in the final two days of the Test match to avoid a second consecutive draw, with Siddle being the most successful Australian bowler with four wickets. Whilst showing clear signs of exhaustion throughout the final day, Siddle pushed through and took wickets late in the match but was unable to get Australia the win.

Following his heavy workload in the first two Tests of the series, Siddle was rested for the final match. Some of his critics blamed this on his new vegetarian diet, though Siddle denied that his diet was responsible for the fatigue. When Siddle returned to the Test team for the series against Sri Lanka, he registered his career-best bowling figures in Test cricket, taking nine wickets across both of Sri Lanka's innings. His spell of 4 for 50 at Hobart was nominated to be one of the best Test bowling performances of the year by ESPNCricinfo. Siddle then struggled to make an impact with his bowling in India, though he did make history by becoming the first number 9 batsman to score a half century in both innings of a Test match.

=== Back-to-back Ashes series (2013–2014) ===
Despite nearly constant speculation about his place in the Test team, Siddle was the only Australian bowler to play all ten Tests across the 2013 and 2013–14 Ashes series against England, bowling reliably throughout the two series. At Trent Bridge, in Australia's first bowling innings of either series, Siddle took figures of 5/50 to help bowl England out, proving his value to the team. But his form waned towards the end of the season and he only took one wicket across the last two Tests of the series, which Australia lost 3–0. Again, there were critics who blamed Siddle's poor form on his diet, but Siddle continued to deny that his diet had anything to do with his poor form.

Siddle was also an integral part of Australia's bowling attack when they won the second series in Australia 5–0. He had particular success through both series against English batsman Kevin Pietersen. He dismissed Pietersen 6 times during the two series, making it 10 times in total that Siddle had dismissed Pietersen in Test cricket. Pietersen said that the reason for this was that he didn't have the patience to work through Siddle's 'robotic' and 'suffocating' tactics, and Siddle would bowl with consistently good line and length for long periods of time, resulting in Pietersen scoring much slower against Siddle than against any of the other bowlers in the Australian team. No other bowler dismissed Pietersen on more occasions in Test cricket than Siddle did.

=== More Test matches (2014–2016) ===
Siddle became a victim of the Australian selectors' changing policy, focusing more on outright pace than consistent line and length, resulting in him being dropped from the team when he started to lose some of his bowling speed in early 2014. Siddle had lost weight over the last two years, making it difficult for him to bowl as fast as he had previously, so when Australian coach Darren Lehmann emphasized the importance of him bowling at speeds of around 140 kmph, he worked hard to rebuild his frame and improve his pace. There were again critics who blamed his weight loss and slower bowling on his diet, but Siddle blamed it on the fatigue associated with bowling regularly for long periods of time. No longer a regular part of the Test team, Siddle lost his contract with Cricket Australia in early 2015.

Siddle signed to play for Nottinghamshire in 2014, making himself available for all of the LV County Championship and 50-over matches, but not the Twenty20 matches. In July 2014, he played for the Rest of the World team in the Bicentenary Celebration match at Lord's.

Siddle started to make a comeback to Test cricket in 2015, being brought into Australia's team for the 2015 Ashes series. He subsequently became a regular part of the Australian bowling lineup due to the retirement of Mitchell Johnson and an injury to Mitchell Starc. He played enough Test cricket to get himself back on a Cricket Australia contract, but in February 2016, he again had stress fractures in his back. As a result, he was sidelined for most of 2016, with a likely implication being that he had played his final Test match.

Despite the stress fractures in his back keeping him out of cricket for most of 2016, Siddle still retained his contract with Cricket Australia for the 2016–17 season. He returned from injury in October to play for Victoria in three one-day games and a Sheffield Shield match and was selected to play another Test match against South Africa at the WACA. He had bowling figures of 1/36 and 2/62 in the two innings, as Australia lost the match by 177 runs. This appeared to be Siddle's final Test match for Australia, as he was dropped from the team for the second Test with a back injury. During this summer, the Australian selectors worked on reshaping their bowling attack by focusing more on youth and outright pace, which left Siddle off of their radar moving forwards.

=== Injury and return to Test cricket (2016–2019) ===
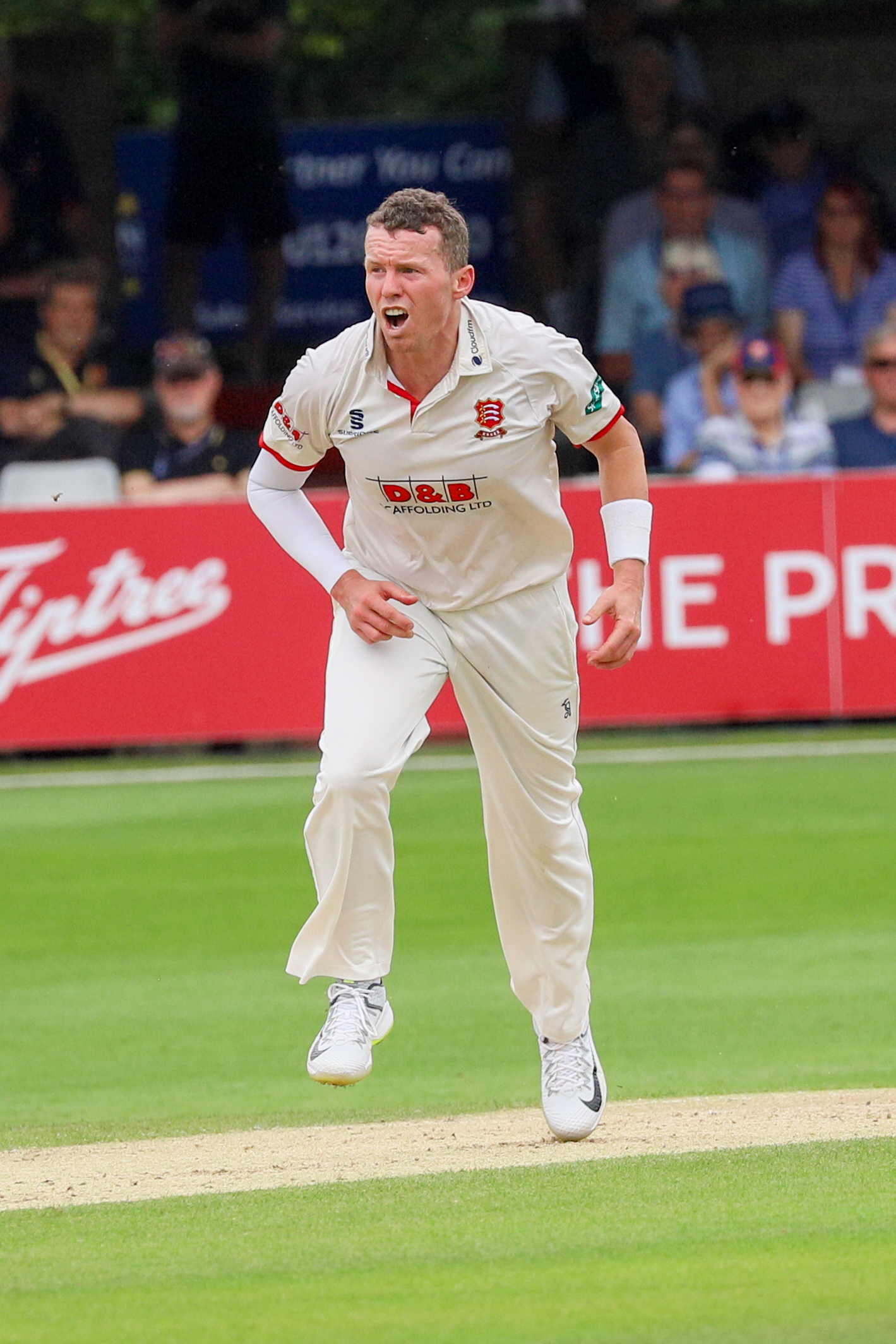
Siddle bowling for Essex in 2019

Siddle's injury kept him out of cricket for a year but, when he returned for the 2017–18 season, he was told that he was still in contention to play Test cricket as James Pattinson was injured and the selectors were looking to protect their young pace attack from being overworked in the upcoming 2017–18 Ashes series. He played every game for Victoria in the 2017–18 JLT One-Day Cup, including an impressive 2/20 performance against the Cricket Australia XI at the tiny Hurstville Oval, a difficult ground to bowl at due to its short boundaries. He then played four of Victoria's first five matches in the 2017–18 Sheffield Shield season, but he only took four wickets and was not included in Australia's squad for the Ashes. This was the first Ashes series he had missed since the 2006–07 Ashes series before his Test debut.

In July 2019, he was named in Australia's squad for the 2019 Ashes series in England, marking his return to the Ashes since the 2015 series. He played 3 matches, with them being at Lord's, Edgbaston, and The Oval. He took 7 wickets throughout the series, at an average 42.14.

== Later career ==
On 29 December 2019, Siddle retired from international cricket, effective immediately.

In January 2026, while 41 years old, Siddle bowled a delivery at 145.8kph against the Hobart Hurricanes.

In February 2026, Siddle was signed by the Multan Sultans for the 2026 Pakistan Super League season, following the league’s first player auction format. He became one of the experienced overseas fast bowlers in the tournament and delivered notable performances in the latter stages of the season. In April 2026, he played a key role against the Karachi Kings, dismissing Abbas Afridi and helping defend a late chase.

== Player profile ==
Siddle is a right-arm fast-medium bowler who also bats right-handed. He has primarily been used as a workhorse, bowling for long periods of time, such as bowling the most overs by an Australian fast bowler in a 21st-century Test match against South Africa in 2012. His charging run-up and powerful delivery is followed by worrying bounce off the pitch.

Siddle is a Test cricket specialist, bowling with great consistency over long periods of time, worrying aggressive batsmen like Kevin Pietersen. Though he did have a brief stint in Australia's limited overs team, issues with his playing style made it difficult for him to make the same impact that he made in Test cricket. His consistent line and length was easy for batsmen to predict in ODI's and he did not have enough variations in his bowling to succeed in T20 International's. Over his career, he toured England 4 times for the Ashes series.

== Veganism ==
Siddle has been a vegan since 2012 when his partner, Anna, an animal rights activist, convinced him to adopt the lifestyle. He is well known for his diet, which involves him eating as many as 20 bananas a day. After becoming a vegan, Siddle faced criticism that his change of diet led to fatigue and slower bowling speeds.

In India [at MRF Pace Foundation], our guys have got to eat protein even if they are considered vegetarian – they have got to eat fish and chicken. I think you have to rebuild muscle after you have had a 50-over Test. I know there is more to it than clouds and grass but I have not seen too many (vegetarian fast bowlers) survive. [Colin] Croft tried it for 18 months and couldn't do it. Sidds is trying it and good luck to him.

— Dennis Lillee, former Australian fast bowler

Siddle has always denied that his poor form was related to his diet change. When he was rested from the third Test against South Africa, he said that it was because of the heavy workload he had faced in the previous two Tests, which had been one of the heaviest workloads of any Australian fast bowler in the 21st century.

I struggled to bowl over 50 overs [before becoming vegetarian] so, to bowl 64, I think that's an improvement. So I'm probably in a better place than I ever was. For people to say that's the problem and that's the reason why [I withdrew], they're the ones kidding themselves. They're not the ones out there having to do it and having to go through it. To still be bowling 140 kmph in my 64th over at the end of the fifth day in a Test match, that probably shows the improvements.

— Peter Siddle

Siddle is also an animals rights activist, doing charity work for Animals Australia's campaign against factory farming, Edgar's Mission (a sanctuary for farm animals) and the Penguin Foundation, which protects penguins living on Phillip Island.

== Personal life ==
Siddle was married to Anna Weatherlake. They became engaged in 2015 after being together for about four years, but split in 2022.

Preceded by Ajantha Mendis	Emerging Player of the Year; 2009	Succeeded by Steven Finn
