= England A cricket team in Bangladesh in 2006–07 =

The England A cricket team toured Bangladesh in the 2006–07 season and played two unofficial 'test'matches and three List-A matches against the Bangladesh A.

The England A team was captained by Michael Yardy and included well-known players like Stuart Broad, Tim Bresnan, Graham Onions, Matt Prior and Nick Compton.

The England A team won the test series 1–0 and the list A series 2–1.
