= English cricket team against Pakistan in the UAE in 2011–12 =

Pakistani cricket team vs England in the UAE in 2012
	Pakistan	England
- Dates: 7 January 2012 – 27 February 2012
Captains	Misbah-ul-Haq	Andrew Strauss (Tests); Alastair Cook (ODIs); Stuart Broad (T20Is)

Test series
- Result: Pakistan won the 3-match series 3–0
Most runs	Azhar Ali (251)	Jonathan Trott (161)
Most wickets	Saeed Ajmal (24)	Monty Panesar (14)
- Player of the series: Saeed Ajmal (Pak)

One Day International series
- Results: England won the 4-match series 4–0
Most runs	Misbah-ul-Haq (108)	Alastair Cook (323)
Most wickets	Saeed Ajmal (10)	Steven Finn (13)
- Player of the series: Alastair Cook (Eng)

Twenty20 International series
- Results: England won the 3-match series 2–1
Most runs	Misbah-ul-Haq (67)	Kevin Pietersen (112)
Most wickets	Saeed Ajmal (5); Umar Gul (5)	Graeme Swann (6)
- Player of the series: Kevin Pietersen (Eng)

The England and Pakistan national cricket teams toured the United Arab Emirates (UAE) from 7 January to 27 February 2012. The tour included three Tests, four One Day Internationals (ODIs) and three Twenty20 Internationals (T20I) between England and Pakistan. The matches were meant to be held in Pakistan, but ongoing security problems in the country meant that the series was moved to the UAE.

England, captained by Andrew Strauss, entered the Test series as the top-ranked team in the world, while Pakistan, led by Misbah-ul-Haq, had won their last three Test series and were ranked fifth.

Pakistan won the Test series after whitewashing England by a 3–0 margin. Pakistan's Saeed Ajmal was named the player of the series, having taken 24 wickets. England gained some form of revenge by whitewashing Pakistan 4–0 in the subsequent one day series, with notable performances from Alastair Cook and Kevin Pietersen with the bat, they both hit centuries in successive games, and Steven Finn with the ball who was the leading wicket-taker in the series with 13 wickets.

England then completed the tour with a 2–1 success in the T20 series, coming back after losing the first match to take the third by 5 runs. That match was notable for Kevin Pietersen becoming only the second batsmen to carry his bat through a T20 international scoring 62, including what proved to be the winning runs by hitting a six off the last ball of England's innings.

== Squads ==
Tests		ODIs		T20Is	
Pakistan	England	Pakistan	England	Pakistan	England
Misbah-ul-Haq (c); Abdur Rehman; Adnan Akmal (wk); Aizaz Cheema; Asad Shafiq; Umar Gul; Azhar Ali; Imran Farhat; Junaid Khan; Mohammad Hafeez; Mohammad Talha; Saeed Ajmal; Taufeeq Umar; Umar Akmal; Wahab Riaz; Younis Khan	Andrew Strauss (c); Alastair Cook (vc); James Anderson; Ian Bell; Ravi Bopara; Tim Bresnan^{1}; Stuart Broad; Steven Davies (wk); Steven Finn; Eoin Morgan; Graham Onions^{1}; Monty Panesar; Kevin Pietersen; Matt Prior (wk); Graeme Swann; Chris Tremlett; Jonathan Trott	Misbah-ul-Haq (c); Abdur Rehman; Adnan Akmal (wk); Aizaz Cheema; Asad Shafiq; Azhar Ali; Hammad Azam; Imran Farhat; Junaid Khan; Mohammad Hafeez; Saeed Ajmal; Shahid Afridi; Shoaib Malik; Umar Akmal; Umar Gul; Wahab Riaz; Younis Khan	Alastair Cook (c); James Anderson; Jonny Bairstow (wk); Ravi Bopara; Tim Bresnan; Danny Briggs; Stuart Broad; Jos Buttler (wk); Jade Dernbach; Steven Finn; Craig Kieswetter (wk); Eoin Morgan; Samit Patel; Kevin Pietersen; Graeme Swann; Jonathan Trott	Misbah-ul-Haq (c); Abdur Rehman; Adnan Akmal (wk); Aizaz Cheema; Asad Shafiq; Awais Zia; Hammad Azam; Imran Farhat; Junaid Khan; Mohammad Hafeez; Saeed Ajmal; Shahid Afridi; Shoaib Malik; Umar Akmal; Umar Gul; Wahab Riaz	Stuart Broad (c); James Anderson; Jonny Bairstow (wk); Ravi Bopara; Tim Bresnan; Danny Briggs; Jos Buttler (wk); Alastair Cook^{2}; Jade Dernbach; Steven Finn; Alex Hales; Craig Kieswetter (wk); Eoin Morgan; Samit Patel; Kevin Pietersen; Graeme Swann

- ^{1} Tim Bresnan withdrew from the Test squad during the first warm-up match. He was replaced by Graham Onions, who was already with the squad as cover.
- ^{2} Alastair Cook stayed on for the T20I series as injury cover for Ravi Bopara.

== Tour matches ==
=== ICC Combined Associate and Affiliate XI v England XI ===
7–9 January 2012
Scorecard

ICC Combined Associate and Affiliate XI	v	England XI
281 (83.3 overs); Christi Viljoen 98 (189); Stuart Broad 4/46 (16.3 overs)		185/8d (55 overs); Alastair Cook 76 (121); Hameed Hassan 2/26 (11 overs)
164/9d (55.3 overs); Mohammad Shahzad 74 (104); Stuart Broad 3/22 (14 overs)		261/7 (60.1 overs); Andrew Strauss 78 (96); Mohammad Nabi 3/66 (17 overs)

England XI won by 3 wickets
ICC Global Cricket Academy, Dubai
Umpires: Buddhi Pradhan (Nep) and Zameer Haider (Pak)

- England won the toss and elected to field.
- Following an injury to Hameed Hassan during England's first innings, he was replaced in the Combined XI team by George Dockrell for the remainder of the match.

=== Pakistan Cricket Board v England XI ===
11–13 January 2012
Scorecard

England XI	v	Pakistan Cricket Board XI
269/9d (81.1 overs); Alastair Cook 133 (260); Yasir Shah 5/76 (26 overs)		200/9d (79 overs); Raza Hasan 50* (133); Monty Panesar 5/57 (29 overs)
181/3d (49.3 overs); Jonathan Trott 93 (150); Yasir Shah 3/38 (11.3 overs)		150 (52.3 overs); Fawad Alam 51 (93); Graham Onions 3/38 (10 overs)

England XI won by 100 runs
ICC Global Cricket Academy, Dubai
Umpires: Ahsan Raza (Pak) and Shozab Raza (Pak)

- Pakistan Cricket Board XI won the toss and elected to field.

=== England Lions v England XI ===
10 February 2012
Scorecard

England Lions; 96 (28.3 overs)	v	England XI; 231/3 (45.5 overs)
Chris Woakes 32* (44); Jade Dernbach 3/21 (8 overs)		Jonathan Trott 75* (92); Scott Borthwick 1/36 (6 overs)

England XI won by 9 wickets
Sheikh Zayed Stadium, Abu Dhabi
Umpires: Mohammad Ali (Pak) and Nayyar Abbas (UAE)

- England Lions won the toss and elected to bat.
- England XI reached their target after 20.1 overs for the loss of one wicket.
- For batting practice, England XI set a nominal target of 230 runs.

== Test series ==
=== 1st Test ===
17–21 January 2012
Scorecard

England	v	Pakistan
192 (72.3 overs); Matt Prior 70* (154); Saeed Ajmal 7/55 (24.3 overs)		338 (119.5 overs); Mohammad Hafeez 88 (164); Graeme Swann 4/107 (29.5 overs)
160 (57.5 overs); Jonathan Trott 49 (111); Umar Gul 4/63 (19 overs)		15/0 (3.4 overs); Mohammad Hafeez 15* (16)

Pakistan won by 10 wickets
Dubai International Cricket Stadium, Dubai
Umpires: Billy Bowden (NZ) and Bruce Oxenford (Aus)
Player of the match: Saeed Ajmal (Pak)

- England won the toss and elected to bat.

Pakistan and England adopted different strategies in selecting their teams for the match. Pakistan selected two full-time spin bowlers—Saeed Ajmal and Abdur Rehman—while England chose only one (Graeme Swann) leaving out Monty Panesar and selecting three pace bowlers. England won the toss, decided to bat, and suffered a top-order collapse at the hands of Pakistan's spinners. Part-time bowler Mohammad Hafeez took the wicket of Alastair Cook, before Ajmal ran through England's batting lineup, taking a career-best 7/55. Five of Ajmal's dismissals were leg before wicket, a record achieved by only five others in Test history. England's only real resistance came from a 57-run partnership between Matt Prior and Graeme Swann. Prior finished the innings on 70 not out, with his team all out for 192.

In response, Pakistan finished the first day of the Test at 0/42. Their innings remained on foot at the end of the second day, after their top order batsmen accumulated runs at a slow pace. They were all out on the third day for 338: a lead of 146. Four batsmen scored half-centuries: Hafeez (88 off 164 balls), Taufeeq Umar (58 off 113), Misbah-ul-Haq (52 off 154) and Adnan Akmal (61 off 129).

Chasing 147 to make Pakistan bat again, England were all out for 160 in the 58th over of their second innings. Umar Gul took four wickets, while Ajmal took another three, taking his match figures to 10/97 and securing the man of the match award. Jonathan Trott top-scored for England with 49. Pakistan's openers chased down their victory target of 15 runs within four overs on the third day, wrapping up a win that their interim coach Mohsin Khan described as a "boost to the nation" after the spot-fixing scandal that had affected Pakistan cricket over the previous two years.

=== 2nd Test ===
25–29 January 2012
Scorecard

Pakistan	v	England
257 (96.4 overs); Misbah-ul-Haq 84 (173); Stuart Broad 4/47 (24 overs)		327 (112 overs); Alastair Cook 94 (220); Saeed Ajmal 4/108 (40 overs)
214 (99.2 overs); Azhar Ali 68 (195); Monty Panesar 6/62 (38.2 overs)		72 (36.1 overs); Andrew Strauss 32 (100); Abdur Rehman 6/25 (10.1 overs)

Pakistan won by 72 runs
Sheikh Zayed Cricket Stadium, Abu Dhabi
Umpires: Steve Davis (Aus) and Bruce Oxenford (Aus)
Player of the match: Abdur Rehman (Pak)

- Pakistan won the toss and elected to bat.

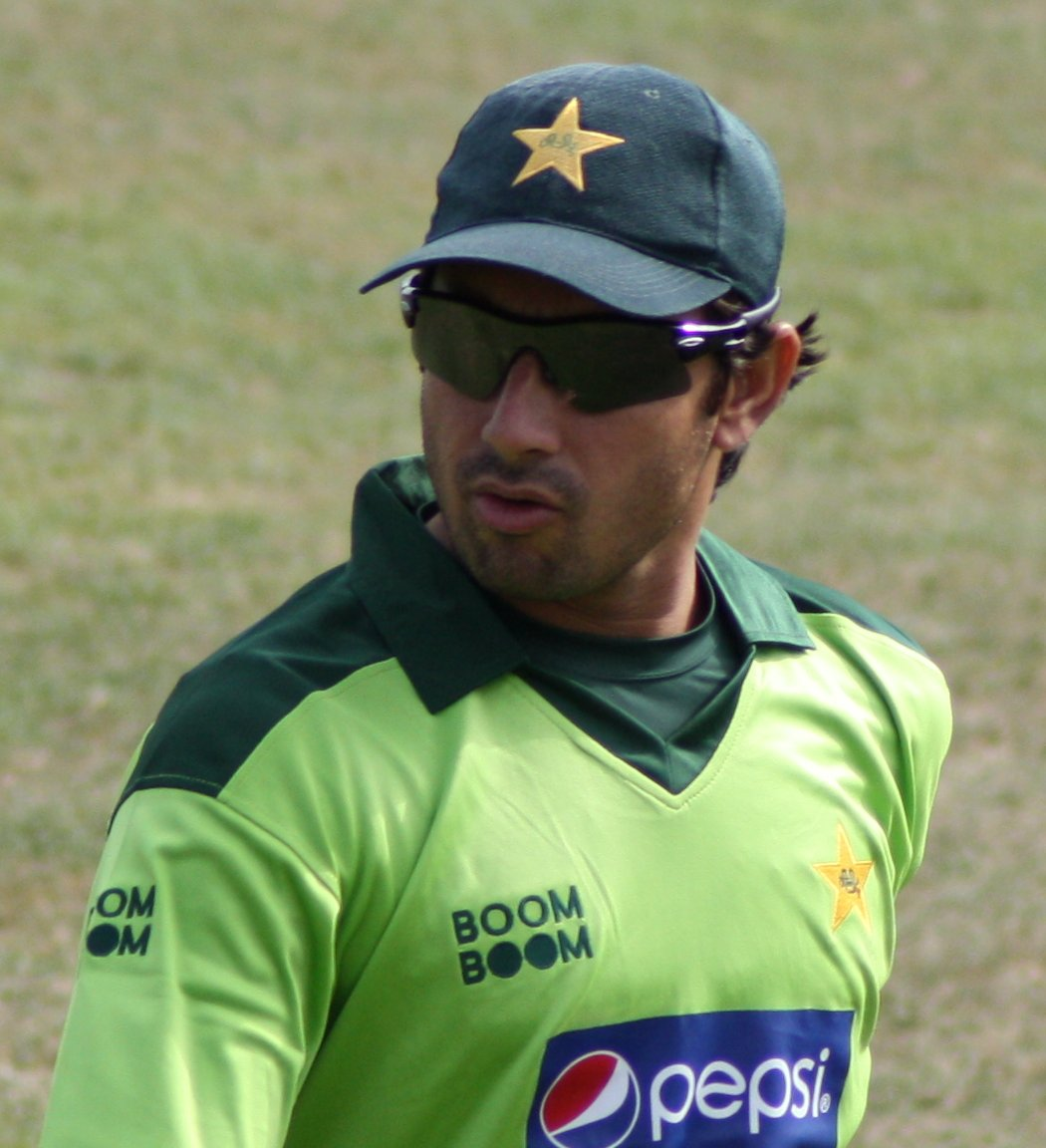
Saeed Ajmal became the fastest Pakistan bowler to reach 100 Test wickets.

Pakistan won the toss and opted to bat first. They made one change to their team, Junaid Khan replacing fellow pace bowler Aizaz Cheema. England captain Andrew Strauss said that he too would have batted first. England's only change was to replace the injured and homeward-bound Chris Tremlett with spinner Monty Panesar. Panesar came on as early as the 10th over; Graeme Swann joined him three overs later. Both Pakistan openers fell to balls that slid on without turning. Pakistan finished the first day of the Test at 7/256. Misbah's resistance stabilised Pakistan after they lost 4 for 103. By the close, Misbah had batted 220 minutes for an unbeaten 83. England began the second day, needing only 16 balls to wrap up Pakistan's last three wickets. Pakistan added only a single from Misbah to their overnight total. England lost 3 for 9 in the last 10 overs of the day, all of them to Saeed Ajmal, Pakistan's 10-wicket destroyer in the first Test in Dubai. Cook fell six runs short of a century, leg before wicket to a doosra from Ajmal. By the end of the day England were 207 for 5. Stuart Broad's 58 from 62 balls helped England to a 70-run first-innings lead.

Pakistan suffered the loss of early wickets before Azhar Ali and Asad Shafiq came together at 54 for 4. The pair took the score to 125 for 4 by the end of the third day. Pakistan ultimately made 214 in their 2nd innings. Monty Panesar took 6 for 62, the second best bowling figures of his Test career, leaving England chasing 145 for victory. England did not even reach the half-way mark, dismissed for 72 in only 36.1 overs, their lowest total since being bowled out for 51 against the West Indies three years previously. Spinner Abdur Rehman took 6 for 25, the first five-wicket haul of his Test career.

Andrew Strauss described England's defeat against Pakistan in Abu Dhabi as among the most painful of his career: "It is a struggle to think of a loss that has hurt more than this," Strauss said. Saeed Ajmal's seven wickets for the match saw him become the fastest Pakistan bowler to 100 Test wickets.

=== 3rd Test ===
3–7 February 2012
Scorecard

Pakistan	v	England
99 (44.1 overs); Asad Shafiq 45 (78); Stuart Broad 4/36 (16 overs)		141 (55 overs); Andrew Strauss 56 (150); Abdur Rehman 5/40 (21 overs)
365 (152.4 overs); Azhar Ali 157 (442); Monty Panesar 5/124 (56.4 overs)		252 (97.3 overs); Matt Prior 49* (58); Umar Gul 4/61 (20 overs)

Pakistan won by 71 runs
Dubai International Cricket Stadium, Dubai
Umpires: Steve Davis (Aus) and Simon Taufel (Aus)
Player of the match: Azhar Ali (Pak)

- Pakistan won the toss and elected to bat.

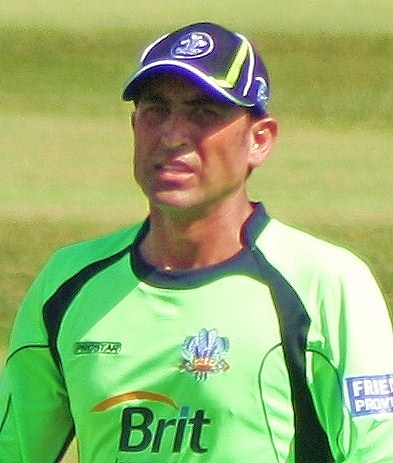
Younis Khan-made 1st century of the series

Day 1

Pakistan won the toss and elected to bat. Pakistan made one change, Aizaz Cheema back in for Junaid Khan. Pakistan side bundled out for 99 runs in first innings avoiding their lowest Test score against England thanks only to 45 from Asad Shafiq. It was 14th time, Pakistan were bowled out for a score under 100. Stuart Broad and James Anderson, made full use of encouraging conditions and shared 7 wickets. By the close, England were 104 for 6. England, resuming on 104 for 6, lasted 12 overs. James Anderson, the night-watchman, propped forward to the last ball of the first over. Andrew Strauss had extended his overnight 41 to 56 when he came down the pitch to hit Rehman over the legside and was stumped by Adnan Akmal. England led by 42 runs in first innings.

Day 2

On the second day, Younis Khan came to the crease shortly before lunch. By the close, Younis had 115, his third-wicket stand with Azhar Ali (75*) was worth 194 in 72 overs and Pakistan's lead was 180.

Day 3

Younis Khan added only 12 to his overnight 115 before he fell lbw to the deserving Stuart Broad, but Azhar followed up Younis' hundred with one of his own. His highest first-class score, 157 from 442 balls, was an impressive feat of patience and skill. Pakistan scored 365 in their second innings. England survived their initial reconnaissance. There were few devils in the 20 overs up to the close, although Alastair Cook was badly dropped in Umar Gul's second over by Taufeeq Umar at third slip.

Day 4

England, 36 runs banked the previous evening, needed a further 288 at start of play. Strauss fell in the sixth over of the morning. England were all out for 252. Umar Gul and Saeed Ajmal took 4 wickets each and Pakistan won the match by 71 runs. Saeed Ajmal, the Man of the Series, Abdur Rehman tormented England to the end. They shared 43 wickets between them in a three-Test series.

Mohsin Khan, the Pakistan coach, compared his team's whitewash against England to the 1992 Cricket World Cup triumph. "Today is like a dream come true," Mohsin told Sky Sports. "It's not a very experienced team but it's very talented. Today, the captain and all the players have proved they are one of the best in the world. It's a great achievement for the Pakistan team."

=== Player statistics ===
Player	Tests	Runs	Batting average	Wickets	Bowling average
(Pakistan) Azhar Ali	3	251	50.20		
(Pakistan) Younis Khan	3	193	38.60		
(Pakistan) Mohammad Hafeez	3	190	38.00	5	16.00
(Pakistan) Misbah-ul-Haq (c)	3	180	36.00		
(Pakistan) Asad Shafiq	3	167	33.40		
(England) Jonathan Trott	3	161	26.83	1	42.00
(England) Alastair Cook	3	159	26.50		
(England) Matt Prior (wk)	3	150	37.50		
(England) Andrew Strauss (c)	3	150	25.00		
(England) Stuart Broad	3	105	21.00	13	20.46
(England) Graeme Swann	3	105	17.50	13	25.07
(Pakistan) Adnan Akmal (wk)	3	89	17.80		
(Pakistan) Taufeeq Umar	3	87	17.40		
(England) Eoin Morgan	3	82	13.66		
(England) Kevin Pietersen	3	67	11.16	0	
(England) James Anderson	3	54	10.80	9	27.66
(England) Ian Bell	3	51	8.50		
(Pakistan) Saeed Ajmal	3	42	8.40	24	14.70
(Pakistan) Umar Gul	3	27	9.00	11	22.27
(Pakistan) Abdur Rehman	3	16	3.20	19	16.73
(England) Monty Panesar	2	8	4.00	14	21.57
(England) Chris Tremlett	1	1	0.50	0	
(Pakistan) Junaid Khan	1	0	0.00	0	
(Pakistan) Aizaz Cheema	2	0		1	70.00

== ODI series ==
=== 1st ODI ===
13 February 2012 (D/N)
Scorecard

England; 260/7 (50 overs)	v	Pakistan; 130 (35 overs)
Alastair Cook 137 (142); Saeed Ajmal 5/43 (10 overs)		Shahid Afridi 28 (22); Steven Finn 4/34 (10 overs)

England won by 130 runs
Sheikh Zayed Stadium, Abu Dhabi
Umpires: Ahsan Raza (Pak) and Simon Taufel (Aus)
Player of the match: Alastair Cook (Eng)

- England won the toss and elected to bat.

=== 2nd ODI ===
15 February 2012 (D/N)
Scorecard

England; 250/4 (50 overs)	v	Pakistan; 230 (49 overs)
Alastair Cook 102 (121); Aizaz Cheema 2/49 (9 overs)		Misbah-ul-Haq 47 (59); Steven Finn 4/34 (10 overs)

England won by 20 runs
Sheikh Zayed Stadium, Abu Dhabi
Umpires: Aleem Dar (Pak) and Kumar Dharmasena (SL)
Player of the match: Alastair Cook (Eng)

- England won the toss and elected to bat.

=== 3rd ODI ===
18 February 2012 (D/N)
Scorecard

Pakistan; 222 (50 overs)	v	England; 226/1 (37.2 overs)
Shahid Afridi 51 (55); Steven Finn 3/24 (10 overs)		Kevin Pietersen 111* (98); Saeed Ajmal 1/40 (10 overs)

England won by 9 wickets
Dubai International Cricket Stadium, Dubai
Umpires: Aleem Dar (Pak) and Simon Taufel (Aus)
Player of the match: Kevin Pietersen (Eng)

- Pakistan won the toss and elected to bat.

=== 4th ODI ===
21 February 2012 (D/N)
Scorecard

Pakistan; 237 (50 overs)	v	England; 241/6 (49.2 overs)
Asad Shafiq 65 (78); Jade Dernbach 4/45 (10 overs)		Kevin Pietersen 130 (153); Saeed Ajmal 3/62 (10 overs)

England won by 4 wickets
Dubai International Cricket Stadium, Dubai
Umpires: Kumar Dharmasena (SL) and Zameer Haider (Pak)
Player of the match: Kevin Pietersen (Eng)

- Pakistan won the toss and elected to bat.

== T20I series ==
=== 1st T20I ===
23 February 2012 (D/N)
Scorecard

Pakistan; 144/6 (20 overs)	v	England; 136/6 (20 overs)
Shoaib Malik 39 (33); Graeme Swann 3/13 (4 overs)		Ravi Bopara 39 (32); Umar Gul 3/18 (4 overs)

Pakistan won by 8 runs
Dubai International Cricket Stadium, Dubai
Umpires: Ahsan Raza (Pak) and Shozab Raza (Pak)
Player of the match: Umar Gul (Pak)

- England won the toss and elected to field.

=== 2nd T20I ===
25 February 2012 (D/N)
Scorecard

England; 150/7 (20 overs)	v	Pakistan; 112 (18.2 overs)
Jonny Bairstow 60* (46); Umar Gul 2/31 (4 overs)		Shahid Afridi 25 (23); Steven Finn 3/30 (4 overs)

England won by 38 runs
Dubai International Cricket Stadium, Dubai
Umpires: Ahsan Raza (Pak) and Zameer Haider (Pak)
Player of the match: Jonny Bairstow (Eng)

- England won the toss and elected to bat.

=== 3rd T20I ===
27 February 2012 (D/N)
Scorecard

England; 129/6 (20 overs)	v	Pakistan; 124/6 (20 overs)
Kevin Pietersen 62* (52); Saeed Ajmal 4/23 (4 overs)		Asad Shafiq 34 (32); Jade Dernbach 2/24 (4 overs)

England won by 5 runs
Sheikh Zayed Stadium, Abu Dhabi
Umpires: Shozab Raza (Pak) and Zameer Haider (Pak)
Player of the match: Kevin Pietersen (Eng)

- England won the toss and elected to bat.
