= English cricket team in Australia in 2010–11 =

	England	Australia
- Dates: 25 November 2010 – 6 February 2011
Captains	Andrew Strauss (Tests, ODIs); Paul Collingwood (T20Is)	Ricky Ponting (1st–4th Tests); Michael Clarke (5th Test, 1st–6th ODIs); Cameron White (T20Is, 7th ODI)

Test series
- Result: England won the 5-match series 3–1
Most runs	Alastair Cook (766)	Mike Hussey (570)
Most wickets	James Anderson (24)	Mitchell Johnson (15)
- Player of the series: Alastair Cook (Eng)

One Day International series
- Results: Australia won the 7-match series 6–1
Most runs	Jonathan Trott (375)	Shane Watson (306)
Most wickets	James Anderson (7); Chris Woakes (7)	Brett Lee (11)
- Player of the series: Shane Watson (Aus)

Twenty20 International series
- Results: 2-match series drawn 1–1
Most runs	Ian Bell (66)	Shane Watson (76)
Most wickets	Michael Yardy (4)	Shane Watson (6)

The England cricket team toured Australia during the 2010–11 season from 25 November 2010 to 6 February 2011. The series comprised the traditional five Tests for The Ashes, and also featured seven ODIs and two Twenty20s. The Umpire Decision Review System was used for the ODI series.

England won the Ashes 3–1, making it the first time in 24 years that they had won the Ashes in Australia.

== First-class matches ==
=== Tour matches ===
==== England v Western Australia ====
5–7 November 2010
Scorecard

Western Australia	v	England XI
242/8d (82 overs); Adam Voges 72 (129); Stuart Broad 3/47 (18 overs)		223/8d (62 overs); Kevin Pietersen 58 (90); Michael Beer 3/108 (24 overs)
223 (69.5 overs); Wes Robinson 54 (122); Graeme Swann 4/101 (28.5 overs)		243/4 (47.4 overs); Andrew Strauss 120* (141); Michael Beer 2/99 (16.4 overs)

England XI won by 6 wickets
WACA Ground, Perth
Umpires: Ian Lock (Aus) and John Ward (Aus)

- Western Australia won the toss and elected to bat.

==== England v South Australia ====
11–13 November 2010
Scorecard

England XI	v	South Australia
288/8d (78.3 overs); Paul Collingwood 94 (116); Peter George 3/65 (17 overs)		221 (67.4 overs); Aiden Blizzard 49 (83); Graeme Swann 4/68 (22.4 overs)
240/1d (52 overs); Alastair Cook 111* (162); Aaron O'Brien 1/72 (13 overs)		48/2 (20.5 overs); Daniel Harris 18* (54); James Anderson 2/23 (8 overs)

Match drawn
Adelaide Oval, Adelaide
Umpires: Simon Fry (Aus) and Bruce Oxenford (Aus)

- England XI won the toss and elected to bat.

==== England v Australia A ====
17–20 November 2010
Scorecard

Australia A	v	England XI
230 (80.1 overs); Steve O'Keefe 66 (116); Chris Tremlett 4/54 (17.1 overs)		523 (141 overs); Ian Bell 192 (275); Steve O'Keefe 4/88 (24 overs)
301 (97 overs); Cameron White 111 (172); Tim Bresnan 4/86 (22 overs)		11/0 (1.3 overs); Andrew Strauss 9* (5)

England XI won by 10 wickets
Bellerive Oval, Hobart
Umpires: Simon Fry (Aus) and Paul Reiffel (Aus)

- England XI won the toss and elected to field.

==== England v Victoria ====
10–12 December 2010
Scorecard

Victoria	v	England XI
216/2d (74 overs); Michael Hill 105* (251); Monty Panesar 1/53 (15 overs)		184/2d (45 overs); Andrew Strauss 66 (98); Jon Holland 2/53 (12 overs)
278/6d (60 overs); Ryan Carters 68 (135); Paul Collingwood 3/19 (6 overs)		211/6 (54 overs); Matt Prior 102* (145); Clint McKay 4/68 (17 overs)

Match drawn
Melbourne Cricket Ground, Melbourne
Umpires: Geoff Joshua (Aus) and Paul Wilson (Aus)

- Victoria won the toss and elected to bat.
- Play on Day 3 was reduced due to rain.

=== Ashes Test series ===
The 2010–11 Ashes series took place from 25 November 2010 to 7 January 2011. Five Tests were played at grounds in Brisbane, Adelaide, Perth, Melbourne and Sydney. England won the series 3–1.

== Limited overs matches ==
=== Tour match ===
10 January 2011
09:45
Scorecard

Prime Minister's XI; 254/9 (43 overs)	v	England XI; 225/3 (33.3 overs)
Daniel Christian 53 (53); Michael Yardy 3/33 (9 overs)		Ian Bell 124* (102); Xavier Doherty 2/38 (7 overs)

England XI won by 7 wickets (D/L)
Manuka Oval, Canberra
Umpires: Simon Fry and Andrew Shelley
Player of the match: Ian Bell (Eng XI)

- Prime Minister's XI won the toss and elected to bat.
- Rain first reduced the match to 43 overs per side. England XI's target was then reduced to 223 runs from 35 overs according to the Duckworth–Lewis method.

== T20I series ==
=== Squads ===
Following the defeat in the 2010–11 Ashes series, Michael Clarke announced his retirement from Twenty20, to focus on Test and 50-over cricket. Cameron White will take over as captain, with Tim Paine as vice-captain.

Australia	England
Cameron White (c)	Paul Collingwood (c)
Tim Paine (wk and vc)	Ian Bell
Aaron Finch	Tim Bresnan
David Hussey	Steve Davies (wk)
Mitchell Johnson	Steven Finn
Brett Lee	Michael Lumb
Stephen O'Keefe	Eoin Morgan
James Pattinson	Kevin Pietersen
Steve Smith	Ajmal Shahzad
Shaun Tait	Graeme Swann
David Warner	James Tredwell
Shane Watson	Chris Tremlett
	Jonathan Trott
	Chris Woakes
	Luke Wright
	Michael Yardy

=== 1st T20I ===
12 January 2011
19:05 (D/N)
Scorecard

Australia; 157/4 (20 overs)	v	England; 158/9 (20 overs)
Shane Watson 59 (31); Michael Yardy 2/28 (4 overs)		Eoin Morgan 43 (33); Shane Watson 4/15 (4 overs)

England won by 1 wicket
Adelaide Oval, Adelaide
Attendance: 32,054
Umpires: Simon Fry and Bruce Oxenford
Player of the match: Shane Watson (Aus)

- Australia won the toss and elected to bat.

Prior to the start of the match, a minute's silence was held for victims of the recent flooding in Queensland. Both teams donated part of their match fees to help the victims and £18,000 (A$28,450) was collected from people in the ground. England's victory was their eighth consecutive win, setting a world record for most consecutive wins in Twenty20 Internationals.

=== 2nd T20I ===
14 January 2011
19:35 (D/N)
Scorecard

Australia; 147/7 (20 overs)	v	England; 143/6 (20 overs)
Aaron Finch 53* (33); Graeme Swann 2/19 (4 overs); Michael Yardy 2/19 (4 overs)		Ian Bell 39 (30); Mitchell Johnson 3/29 (4 overs)

Australia won by 4 runs
Melbourne Cricket Ground, Melbourne
Attendance: 58,837
Umpires: Bruce Oxenford (Aus) and Paul Reiffel (Aus)
Player of the match: Aaron Finch (Aus)

- Australia won the toss and elected to bat.

== ODI series ==
=== Squads ===
Australia	England
Michael Clarke (c)	Andrew Strauss (c)
Cameron White (vc)	James Anderson
Doug Bollinger	Ian Bell
Xavier Doherty	Tim Bresnan
Brad Haddin (wk)	Paul Collingwood
Nathan Hauritz	Steve Davies (wk)
David Hussey	Steven Finn
Michael Hussey	Eoin Morgan
Mitchell Johnson	Kevin Pietersen
Brett Lee	Ajmal Shahzad
Peter Siddle	Graeme Swann
Steve Smith	James Tredwell
Shaun Tait	Chris Tremlett
Shane Watson	Jonathan Trott
	Chris Woakes
	Luke Wright
	Michael Yardy

=== 1st ODI ===
16 January 2011
14:20 (D/N)
Scorecard

England; 294 (49.4 overs)	v	Australia; 297/4 (49.1 overs)
Kevin Pietersen 78 (75); Steve Smith 2/12 (3 overs)		Shane Watson 161* (150); Tim Bresnan 2/71 (10 overs)

Australia won by 6 wickets
Melbourne Cricket Ground, Melbourne
Attendance: 34,845
Umpires: Billy Bowden (NZ) and Bruce Oxenford (Aus)
Player of the match: Shane Watson (Aus)

- England won the toss and elected to bat.

Shane Watson's score of 161 not out was the fifth-highest ODI score by an Australian. The Australian total was the highest successful run chase in ODI matches played at the MCG.

=== 2nd ODI ===
21 January 2011
14:20 (D/N)
Scorecard

Australia; 230 (48.3 overs)	v	England; 184 (45 overs)
Shaun Marsh 110 (114); Chris Tremlett 3/22 (9.2 overs)		Jonathan Trott 32 (58); Doug Bollinger 4/28 (9 overs)

Australia won by 46 runs
Bellerive Oval, Hobart
Attendance: 15,125
Umpires: Tony Hill (NZ) and Paul Reiffel (Aus)
Player of the match: Shaun Marsh (Aus)

- England won the toss and elected to field.

=== 3rd ODI ===
23 January 2011
14:20 (D/N)
Scorecard

England; 214 (48 overs)	v	Australia; 215/6 (46 overs)
Jonathan Trott 84* (119); Brett Lee 3/27 (8 overs)		David Hussey 68* (89); Paul Collingwood 2/25 (8 overs)

Australia won by 4 wickets
Sydney Cricket Ground, Sydney
Attendance: 36,072
Umpires: Gary Baxter (NZ) and Paul Reiffel (Aus)
Player of the match: Brett Lee (Aus)

- England won the toss and elected to bat.

=== 4th ODI ===
26 January 2011
13:50 (D/N)
Scorecard

England; 299/8 (50 overs)	v	Australia; 278/7 (50 overs)
Jonathan Trott 102 (126); David Hussey 4/21 (4 overs)		Shane Watson 64 (72); Jonathan Trott 2/31 (7 overs)

England won by 21 runs
Adelaide Oval, Adelaide
Attendance: 34,393
Umpires: Marais Erasmus (SA) and Simon Fry (Aus)
Player of the match: Jonathan Trott (Eng)

- England won the toss and elected to bat.

=== 5th ODI ===
30 January 2011
13:20 (D/N)
Scorecard

Australia; 249 (49.3 overs)	v	England; 198 (45.3 overs)
Michael Clarke 54 (74); Chris Woakes 6/45 (10 overs)		Kevin Pietersen 40 (51); Shane Watson 3/25 (4.3 overs)

Australia won by 51 runs
Brisbane Cricket Ground, Brisbane
Umpires: Asad Rauf (Pak) and Rod Tucker (Aus)
Player of the match: Chris Woakes (Eng)

- Australia won the toss and elected to bat.

=== 6th ODI ===
2 February 2011
14:20 (D/N)
Scorecard

England; 333/6 (50 overs)	v	Australia; 334/8 (49.2 overs)
Jonathan Trott 137 (126); Shaun Tait 2/59 (10 overs)		Michael Clarke 82 (70); Steven Finn 2/51 (10 overs)

Australia won by 2 wickets
Sydney Cricket Ground, Sydney
Umpires: Marais Erasmus (SA) and Daryl Harper (Aus)
Player of the match: Jonathan Trott (Eng)

- England won the toss and elected to bat.

England's score of 333 was their highest score against Australia, and the highest ODI total without a six. Australia's score of 334 was their highest ODI score when batting second. This was also the highest successful run chase at the SCG by Australia.

=== 7th ODI ===
6 February 2011
11:20
Scorecard

Australia; 279/7 (50 overs)	v	England; 222 (44 overs)
Adam Voges 80* (72); James Anderson 3/48 (10 overs)		Michael Yardy 60* (76); Mitchell Johnson 3/18 (7 overs)

Australia won by 57 runs.
WACA Ground, Perth
Umpires: Asad Rauf (Pak) and Paul Reiffel (Aus)
Player of the match: Adam Voges (Aus)

- Australia won the toss and elected to bat.
