= English cricket team in Ireland in 2011 =

England cricket team in Ireland in 2011
	England	Ireland
- Date: 25 August 2011
Captains	Eoin Morgan	William Porterfield

One Day International series
- Results: England won the 1-match series 1–0
Most runs	Jonathan Trott (69)	Kevin O'Brien (26)
Most wickets	Jade Dernbach (3)	John Mooney (3)
- Player of the series: Eoin Morgan (Eng)

The England cricket team visited Ireland on 25 August 2011 for a single One Day International (ODI).

== Squads ==
England	Ireland
Eoin Morgan (c); Jonny Bairstow; Ravi Bopara; Scott Borthwick; Jade Dernbach; Steven Finn; Craig Kieswetter†; Graham Onions; Samit Patel; Ben Stokes; James Taylor; Jonathan Trott; Chris Woakes	William Porterfield (c); Paul Stirling; Ed Joyce; Niall O'Brien†; Alex Cusack; Gary Wilson; Kevin O'Brien; John Mooney; Nigel Jones; Boyd Rankin; George Dockrell; Albert van der Merwe; Andrew White

== ODI Series ==
=== Only ODI ===
25 August
Scorecard

England; 201/8 (42 overs)	v	Ireland; 117/8 (23 overs)
Jonathan Trott 69 (105); John Mooney 3/32 (7 overs)		Kevin O'Brien 26 (15); Jade Dernbach 3/30 (5 overs)

England win by 11 runs (D/L)
Clontarf Cricket Club Ground, Dublin
Umpires: Steve Davis (Aus) and Mark Hawthorne (Ire)
Player of the match: Eoin Morgan (Eng)

- Ireland won the toss and elected to field.
- Rain reduced match to 42 overs per innings.
- Rain shortened Ireland's innings to 23 overs with a revised target of 129 runs.
