= Tim Tremlett =

English cricketer and cricket director

Personal information
- Full name: Timothy Maurice Tremlett
- Born: 26 July 1956 (age 70); Wellington, Somerset, England
- Batting: Right-handed
- Bowling: Right-arm medium
- Relatives: Maurice Tremlett (father); Chris Tremlett (son)

Domestic team information
- Years: Team
- 1976–1991: Hampshire

Career statistics
Competition	First-class	List A
Matches	207	213
Runs scored	3,864	870
Batting average	21.00	14.03
100s/50s	1/18	0/0
Top score	102*	43*
Balls bowled	26,540	9,632
Wickets	450	266
Bowling average	23.99	24.69
5 wickets in innings	11	1
10 wickets in match	0	0
Best bowling	6/53	5/28
Catches/stumpings	73/–	44/–
- Source: Cricinfo, 18 January 2010

Timothy Maurice Tremlett (born 26 July 1956) is a former English cricketer and director of cricket of Hampshire County Cricket Club. He is the father of England Test cricketer Chris Tremlett who also played for Hampshire and later, Surrey. Tremlett was an all-rounder, a right-handed batsman and right-arm medium pace bowler, who had a first-class bowling average of 23.99 and a one-day average of 24.69. He played from 1976 until 1991, and helped Hampshire win the Sunday League title in 1978 and 1986.

Tremlett was part of an England 'B' tour to Sri Lanka in 1985–6, and an "English Counties XI" tour of Zimbabwe in 1984–5, both captained by his county captain Mark Nicholas.

Tremlett's father, Maurice Tremlett, played county cricket for Somerset County Cricket Club and appeared in three Test matches for England.

Sporting positions
Preceded by Peter Sainsbury	Hampshire cricket coach 1991–1996	Succeeded by Malcolm Marshall
