= Jade Dernbach =

English cricketer

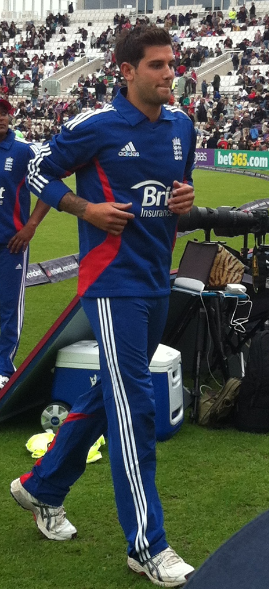
- Dernbach playing for England in 2012

Personal information
- Full name: Jade Winston Dernbach
- Born: 3 March 1986 (age 40); Johannesburg, Transvaal Province, South Africa
- Height: 6 ft 1.5 in (1.87 m)
- Batting: Right-handed
- Bowling: Right-arm fast-medium
- Role: Bowler

International information
- National sides: England (2011–2014); Italy (2021)
- ODI debut (cap 219): 28 June 2011; England v Sri Lanka
- Last ODI: 2 June 2013; England v New Zealand
- T20I debut (cap 52/17): 25 June 2011; England v Sri Lanka
- Last T20I: 21 October 2021; Italy v Germany

Domestic team information
- Years: Team
- 2003–2021: Surrey (squad no. 16)
- 2011/12: Melbourne Stars
- 2015/16–2016/17: Wellington
- 2016: Quetta Gladiators
- 2019: Jamaica Tallawahs

Career statistics
Competition	ODI	T20I	FC	LA
Matches	24	40	113	144
Runs scored	19	31	871	242
Batting average	2.71	5.16	9.46	7.56
100s/50s	0/0	0/0	0/1	0/0
Top score	5	12	56*	31
Balls bowled	1,234	826	18,222	6,283
Wickets	31	44	311	228
Bowling average	42.19	26.59	32.60	27.10
5 wickets in innings	0	0	10	3
10 wickets in match	0	0	0	0
Best bowling	4/45	4/22	6/47	6/35
Catches/stumpings	5/–	10/–	17/–	31/–
- Source: ESPNcricinfo, 11 March 2022

Jade Winston Dernbach (born 3 March 1986) is a former professional cricketer. Born in South Africa, he represented Surrey (2003–2021), England (2011–2014) and Italy (2021).

He made his first-class debut in 2003 and won the NBC Denis Compton Award in 2004 and 2009. In 2021, Dernbach qualified to represent the Italy national cricket team.

Born in South Africa and initially schooled at St John's College, Johannesburg, he moved to England at the age of 14 and gained British citizenship, making him eligible for the England cricket team. After impressing for the England Lions in the West Indies in the early part of 2011, he was called up to the senior team as a replacement for Ajmal Shahzad for the knock out stages of the 2011 Cricket World Cup and made his Twenty20 and ODI debuts later that year against Sri Lanka. Dernbach made his international debut for Italy in October 2021.

Derek Pringle described him in The Daily Telegraph as a fast bowler who is capable of obtaining conventional and reverse swing, as well as of deceiving the batsman by bowling a variety of slower balls.

== Personal life ==
Dernbach was born in Johannesburg, South Africa to a South African father and an Italian mother and has used an Italian passport. He moved with his family to England in 2000 when he was 14. In South Africa, his preferred sport was rugby union, but he began to develop as a cricketer in England. After bowling at an under-15s net session at Surrey, he quickly moved through the age groups.

Although born in South Africa, after his first call-up to the England squad, he stated that "I don't owe anything to South Africa. I was just born there, did a bit of schooling there, my whole cricket career has been based in the UK, and UK is my home. I want to give everything I can to England cricket, that's the country I love and that's the country that has given me everything I have now."

== County cricket ==
His consistency and regular wicket-taking for Surrey was rewarded with a place on the 2011 England Lions tour to the West Indies, before a late call-up to England's 2011 World Cup squad made him the first Surrey youth academy graduate to secure recognition at this level. He continued to perform well for Surrey whenever available. His 2011 season was capped with a Man of the Match performance in the CB40 Final, where his 4/30 helped lift Surrey to victory.

Dernbach was effective in Surrey's successful T20 campaign in 2013, and was the side's leading wicket taker with 18 wickets (at an average of 16.44) as Surrey reached the Finals Day at Edgbaston for the first time since 2006.

In July 2021, Dernbach joined Derbyshire on loan from Surrey to play in the last four group games of the 2021 T20 Blast.

It was announced in July 2021 that Dernbach was to leave Surrey at the end of the season due to a lack of playing time.

== International cricket ==
In 2010, Dernbach was selected for the England Performance Programme tour of Australia and subsequent England Lions tour of the West Indies where they participated in the domestic Regional Four Day Competition. In the latter, he took 19 wickets at an average of 15.63, making him the leading English bowler.

He was called up to the senior team as a replacement for Ajmal Shahzad for the knock out stages of the 2011 Cricket World Cup but was not picked to play.

At the beginning of the English season, he was then picked for the Lions to face the touring Sri Lankans. He took 9 wickets in the match, although the Lions ultimately lost the match. However his performance saw him included in the senior squad for the second Test after an injury to James Anderson. He had to wait until the limited overs games to make his debut; taking 1–18 in his first Twenty20 International and 2–25 in his first ODI.

Dernbach was a member of the England ODI squad for their match against Ireland in August 2011.

He has gone on to make 24 appearances for the ODI and 34 for the England t20 side.

In the 2012 ICC World T20, he and Steven Finn equalled the tournament record for the highest 10th wicket partnership.

At the time of his final international appearance to date, Dernbach had the worst career economy rate in both ODIs (bowlers bowling more than 1000 balls) and T20Is (bowlers bowling more than 500 balls). As of September 2018, his record is third-worst and fifth-worst respectively.

He announced his retirement from international cricket in July 2019, five years after his last T20I appearance.

In September 2021, he was named in Italy's squad for the 2021 ICC Men's T20 World Cup Europe Qualifier. He made his T20I debut for Italy on 15 October 2021, against Denmark.
