= Maurice Tremlett =

English cricketer

Personal information
- Full name: Maurice Fletcher Tremlett
- Born: 5 July 1923; Stockport, Cheshire, England
- Died: 30 July 1984 (aged 61); Southampton, Hampshire, England
- Batting: Right-handed
- Bowling: Right-arm fast-medium
- Relatives: Tim Tremlett (son); Chris Tremlett (grandson)

International information
- National side: England
- Test debut (cap 331): 21 January 1948 v West Indies
- Last Test: 27 March 1948 v West Indies

Domestic team information
- Years: Team
- 1947–1960: Somerset
- 1951/52: Central Districts

Career statistics
Competition	Test	First-class
Matches	3	389
Runs scored	20	16,038
Batting average	6.66	25.37
100s/50s	0/0	16/83
Top score	18*	185
Balls bowled	492	22,093
Wickets	4	351
Bowling average	56.50	30.70
5 wickets in innings	0	11
10 wickets in match	0	0
Best bowling	2/98	8/31
Catches/stumpings	0/–	257/–
- Source: Cricinfo, 28 August 2009

Maurice Fletcher Tremlett (5 July 1923 – 30 July 1984) was an English cricketer, who played for Somerset, Central Districts and England.

For a couple of years in the late 1940s, Tremlett looked as though he might be the answer to some of England's post-war cricketing woes. A tall, curly-haired all-rounder, Tremlett had a whippy fast-medium bowling action that moved the ball off the pitch and was a pugnacious right-handed batsman, strong at driving.

== Life and career ==
Tremlett was born in Stockport, Cheshire.

His first-class debut was sensational. Having been on the Somerset staff since before World War II, he was finally picked for the first game of the 1947 season, at Lord's against Middlesex, the team that would dominate that season's County Championship. Tremlett took three wickets in the first innings, and then five in the space of five overs in the second, to finish with match figures of 8 for 86. He then followed that up by making an undefeated 19, and sharing in a last-wicket partnership that enabled Somerset to win the match by one wicket.

By the end of that first season, Tremlett had 656 runs and 65 wickets and he was chosen, with several other young cricketers, for the Marylebone Cricket Club (MCC) tour to the West Indies, where he opened the bowling in three of the four Test matches. He was not a success, taking only four wickets and scoring just 20 runs in the Tests, and on the tour as a whole, his wickets were expensive and he scored few runs. Yet after another successful county season in 1948 – 1056 runs and 86 wickets, both at an improved average – he was picked for a second MCC tour in 1948–49, this time to South Africa. Though he scored his maiden century in the match against a Natal team at Pietermaritzburg, Tremlett was never in contention for a Test place and Wisden's report on the tour said that his "bowling lacked control". After playing in South Africa, he was later one of many signatories in a letter to The Times on 17 July 1958 opposing 'the policy of apartheid' in international sport and defending 'the principle of racial equality which is embodied in the Declaration of the Olympic Games'.

Over the next few years, Tremlett's batting developed to the point where, in 1951, he scored more than 2,000 runs. In all, he scored 1,000 runs in a season ten times. But his bowling became more and more erratic until, by the mid-1950s, he was used only as an occasional change bowler. From 1956, he captained Somerset, their first professional skipper, charged with the job of restoring the fortunes of a county that had finished bottom of the Championship table for each of the preceding four seasons. As a captain, he was a great success, leading the team in 1958 to third position in the Championship, its highest placing ever. He stood down from the captaincy after the 1959 season and, after a few games in 1960, he retired to a job with Guinness.

His son, Tim Tremlett, was a fast-medium bowler for Hampshire in the 1970s and 1980s, and later the county's coach. Tim's son (and Maurice's grandson), Chris Tremlett, also a fast-medium bowler for Hampshire and later for Surrey, played for England in Tests and One Day Internationals.

Maurice Tremlett died in Southampton in 1984, at the age of 61.

Sporting positions
Preceded by Gerry Tordoff	Somerset County Cricket Captain; 1956–1959	Succeeded by Harold Stephenson
