= 2010–11 Ashes series =

- Part of English cricket team in Australia in 2010–11
- The Vodafone Ashes Series 2010–11 logo
- Date: 25 November 2010 – 7 January 2011
- Location: Australia
- Result: England won the five-Test series 3–1
- Player of the series: Compton–Miller Medal: Alastair Cook (Eng)
Teams
- Australia: England
Captains
- Ricky Ponting (Note: Michael Clarke captained Australia for the fifth Test.): Andrew Strauss
Most runs
- Mike Hussey (570) Shane Watson (435) Brad Haddin (360): Alastair Cook (766); Jonathan Trott (445); Kevin Pietersen (360)
Most wickets
- Mitchell Johnson (15) Peter Siddle (14) Ryan Harris (11): James Anderson (24); Chris Tremlett (17); Graeme Swann (15)

The 2010–11 Ashes series (known as the Vodafone Ashes Series for sponsorship reasons) was the 66th series of Test cricket matches played to contest The Ashes. The series was played in Australia as part of the England cricket team's tour of the country during the 2010–11 season. Five Tests were played from 25 November 2010 to 7 January 2011. England won the series 3–1 and retained the Ashes, having won the previous series in 2009 by two Tests to one. It was the first time in 24 years that England had won the Ashes in Australia. As of 2025–26, it remains the most recent occasion that England has won an Ashes series in Australia.

== Background ==
Prior to the start of the 2010–11 Ashes series, Australia had won 31 series to England's 29. The remaining five were draws. England won the most recent series in 2009 by two Tests to one, but Australia had whitewashed the last one held on Australian soil (the 2006–07 series), winning 5–0. The last time England won the Ashes on Australian soil was in 1986–87.

The two countries also met in the 2010 ICC World Twenty20 final in Bridgetown, Barbados on 16 May, with England winning by seven wickets with three overs to spare to claim their first ICC world championship. The two sides also played each other in England in June and July 2010 in a five-match ODI series as a prelude to the upcoming summer. England won the first three ODIs to claim the series, but the Australians won the last two.

The Australians remained in England to face Pakistan, losing both Twenty20 Internationals and drawing a two-Test series 1–1. England, meanwhile, beat Bangladesh 2–1 in a three-match ODI series and beat Pakistan in a controversial series – 3–1 in a four-match Test series, 2–0 in two T20Is and 3–2 in a five-match ODI series.

In the weeks leading up to the Ashes, Australia faced both India and Sri Lanka in India and Australia respectively. Australia played India in two Tests and three ODIs during October. They lost both Tests, and lost the ODI series 1–0, with the first and third games washed out without any cricket played. Sri Lanka faced Australia during the early part of November with Sri Lanka winning the only Twenty20 International and winning the ODI series 2–1.

== Venues ==
As with other recent Ashes series in Australia, this series was played at the main cricket grounds in Australia's five largest cities. Tickets for the Ashes series started selling on 25 July 2010, and within a week many Test days were sold out.

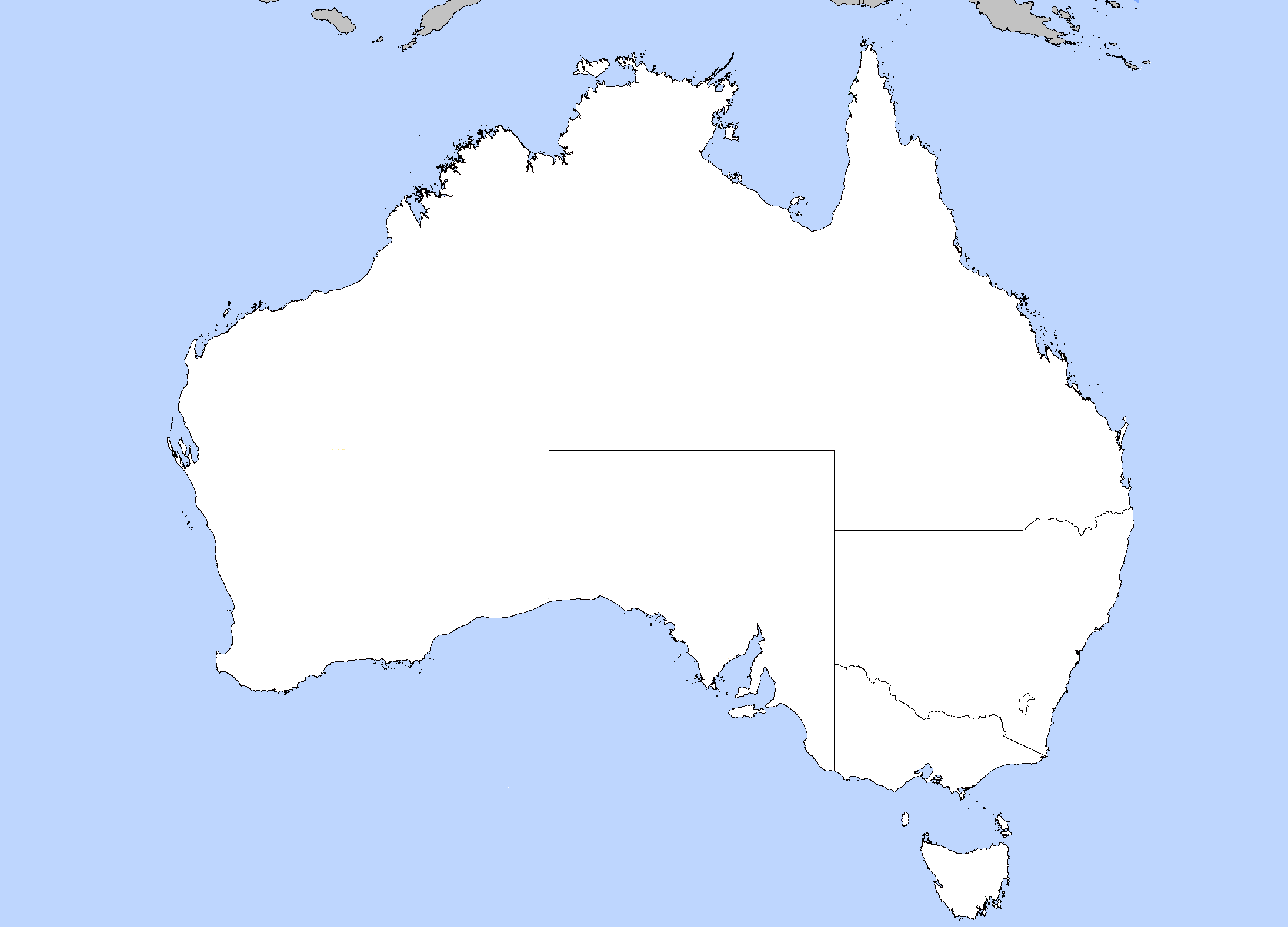

Test	Location	Stadium Name	Capacity	Date
First Test	Brisbane	The Gabba	42,200	25–29 November
Second Test	Adelaide	Adelaide Oval	36,000	3–7 December
Third Test	Perth	WACA Ground	24,000	16–20 December
Fourth Test	Melbourne	Melbourne Cricket Ground	100,000	26–30 December
Fifth Test	Sydney	Sydney Cricket Ground	46,000	3–7 January

== Squads ==
The England squad was announced on 23 September 2010. In addition to England's 16-man squad, a 15-man Performance Programme squad was named that also toured Australia during the series. That squad arrived in Brisbane on 13 November, before playing a four-day match against a Queensland XI (25–28 November) and a Western Australia XI (7–10 December) in Perth before departing on 16 December.

A 17-man Australian squad was announced on 15 November 2010 for the first Ashes Test, and the squad was reduced to 13 five days later. The players included in that initial squad but who were not part of a final Test squad are marked with an asterisk below. In addition to the original 17-man squad, left-arm spinner Michael Beer and left-handed opening batsman Phillip Hughes were later called up for the final three Tests. When captain Ricky Ponting was ruled out of the final Test with a broken finger, Michael Clarke took over as captain and Brad Haddin became vice-captain.

England	Australia
Andrew Strauss (c); Alastair Cook (vc); James Anderson; Ian Bell; Tim Bresnan; Stuart Broad; Paul Collingwood; Steven Davies (wk); Steven Finn; Eoin Morgan; Monty Panesar; Kevin Pietersen; Ajmal Shahzad; Matt Prior (wk); Graeme Swann; Chris Tremlett; Jonathan Trott	Ricky Ponting (c); Michael Clarke (vc); Michael Beer; Doug Bollinger; Xavier Doherty; ~~Callum Ferguson~~; Brad Haddin (wk); Ryan Harris; ~~Nathan Hauritz~~; Ben Hilfenhaus; Phillip Hughes; Michael Hussey; Mitchell Johnson; Simon Katich; Usman Khawaja; Marcus North; Peter Siddle; Steve Smith; Shane Watson

== Matches ==
=== First Test ===
25–29 November 2010
Scorecard

England	v	Australia
260 (76.5 overs); Ian Bell 76 (131); Peter Siddle 6/54 (16 overs)		481 (158.4 overs); Michael Hussey 195 (330); Steven Finn 6/125 (33.4 overs)
1/517d (152 overs); Alastair Cook 235* (428); Marcus North 1/47 (19 overs)		1/107 (26 overs); Ricky Ponting 51* (43); Stuart Broad 1/18 (7 overs)

Match drawn
The Gabba, Brisbane
Umpires: Aleem Dar (Pak) and Billy Doctrove (WI)
Player of the match: Alastair Cook (Eng)

- England won the toss and elected to bat.
- Play on Day 1 was reduced due to rain.
- Play on Day 2 was reduced due to rain and bad light.
- Play on Day 4 was reduced due to bad light.

Andrew Strauss won the toss and elected to bat first, a decision which his opposite number Ricky Ponting echoed was the right decision, but Strauss was dismissed after just three balls, cutting a Hilfenaus delivery that was too close to his body and giving a simple catch to Hussey in the gully. Jonathan Trott played well for his 29 before being castled by Shane Watson, but Kevin Pietersen forged a good partnership with Alastair Cook to take England safely to lunch and past three figures. However, midway through the afternoon session, Peter Siddle – celebrating his 26th birthday – removed Pietersen and Paul Collingwood in successive overs to reduce England to 125/4 and put Australia back on top. Ian Bell came to the crease and provided Cook with able support to see England safely through to tea.

Straight after the tea interval, Siddle ripped through England's lower-middle order, taking a hat-trick by first having Cook caught at slip for a patiently made 67, bowling Prior all ends up and trapping Broad LBW with a toe-crunching yorker; it was the first Ashes hat-trick since Darren Gough took three wickets in Sydney in 1999. When he removed Graeme Swann two overs later, also LBW, Siddle achieved his best Test career figures to date with 6/54. In and amongst the chaos of wickets falling around him, Bell continued to play positively, making a vital 76 before debutant Xavier Doherty took his first Test wicket by having him caught in the deep, and then bowled Anderson attempting a reverse-sweep for 11 to leave England all-out for an under-par score of 260. Australian openers Katich and Watson survived a tricky 30 minutes at the end of Day 1 to finish 25/0, leaving the Australians in a very strong position.

On Day 2, Katich and Watson enjoyed a good first hour of play before Anderson had Watson caught in the slips by Strauss for 38, and then captain Ponting strangled down the leg-side for 10 just after lunch. Katich reached his half-century before Steven Finn took his first Ashes wicket by taking a brilliant catch off his shoe-laces when Katich hit a delivery straight back to him. Michael Hussey was lucky to survive when, still on 0, he edged just centimetres short of Swann at second slip, and England were then left dumbfounded when what they thought was an audible edge off Michael Clarke's bat was not picked up on hot-spot, meaning Aleem Dar's on-field decision of not-out stood. Some aggressive bowling from Stuart Broad and Finn eventually led to Clarke's demise, caught behind for 9 having faced 50 deliveries, and Marcus North was sent back to the pavilion for just 1, leaving Australia in trouble at 143/5.

However, Michael Hussey was joined by wicket-keeper Brad Haddin just before tea on Day 2, and the pair proceeded to compile an outstanding partnership of 307 runs, a record sixth-wicket partnership at the Gabba, to guide Australia to a huge first innings lead. The partnership would last past tea on Day 3, before Haddin was finally out for 136. Hussey meanwhile continued on to an outstanding 195 before he too finally fell. The last three Australian wickets fell for just 23 runs, all to Finn, ending the innings on 481 all out. Although bowler Steven Finn finished with figures of 6/125 on his Ashes debut, England conceded a 221-run first innings deficit.

Beginning their second innings with 15 overs left on Day 3 and so many runs behind, captain Andrew Strauss and fellow opener Alistair Cook knew that victory was out of the question; to give themselves the best chance of saving a draw, they had to bat time as well as accumulate runs, just as Hussey and Haddin had proven on that day's play. Strauss survived an Australian review on just the second ball of the innings, and the pair survived until the end of the day at 19/0.

On Day 4, Strauss and Cook batted England back into the game. Although neither player scored very quickly - both having strike-rates around 50, they punished anything even slightly short and wide. Both reached their half centuries and were 135/0 at lunch, although Strauss was very fortunate when Mitchell Johnson put down a straightforward chance at mid-off. Strauss would go on to make 110 before part-time off-spinner Marcus North deceived him in the flight to give Haddin a simple stumping, ending the opening partnership at 188, an English record at the ground, during which Strauss and Cook overtook Jack Hobbs and Herbert Sutcliffe as England's highest-scoring pair of opening batsmen.Cook, however, just as he had done in the first innings, continued very patiently and was joined by Trott. Together, they set about compiling yet another huge partnership that Australia, try as they might, could not dent. Cook would reach his century just after tea, and Trott would pass 50 after having been put down at backward point by Clarke who couldn't hold onto a spectacular one-handed diving effort, and surviving an Australian LBW review. Bad light stopped play leaving England on 309/1, with a lead of 88 runs but they were by no means out of the woods yet; if Australia could bowl England out before lunch on the final day, there would still be plenty of time to make the necessary runs to win the game.

Cook and Trott, however, had other ideas, continuing to bat superbly. Clarke did drop an absolute sitter at first slip when Trott was on 75, but despite this scare, the pair piled on the runs in the morning session: Trott made his century, Cook made his double century, England passed 400 in the innings and took their overall lead past 200 all before the lunch break. There was minor controversy after lunch when Ponting claimed to have caught Cook at short mid-wicket, only for the umpires to ask for their own review and determine that there was not enough evidence to prove it was a clean catch, leaving the Australian distinctly aggrieved. The innings was finally brought to a close when Strauss declared with England on 517/1, leaving Australia just 41 overs to score 297 runs. Trott finished on 135 not out, combining with Cook for an unbeaten 329-run partnership. Cook, meanwhile, having occupied the crease for over 10 hours in a row across Days 3, 4 and 5, ended his stay on 235 not out, which broke Don Bradman's record for the highest Test score at the Gabba. Every Australian player shook Cook's hand as he left the field in recognition of his display.

With Australia beginning their second innings just before tea, both sides knew that a draw was virtually certain. Although Broad removed Katich for just 4, caught at slip by Strauss, Ricky Ponting made a quick-fire 51 in reply, leaving Australia 107/1 at the end of the day, ending the match in a draw.

=== Second Test ===
3–7 December 2010
Scorecard

Australia	v	England
245 (85.5 overs); Michael Hussey 93 (183); James Anderson 4/51 (19 overs)		5/620d (152 overs); Kevin Pietersen 227 (308); Ryan Harris 2/84 (29 overs)
304 (99.1 overs); Michael Clarke 80 (139); Graeme Swann 5/91 (41.1 overs)

England won by an innings and 71 runs
Adelaide Oval, Adelaide
Umpires: Marais Erasmus (SA) and Tony Hill (NZ)
Player of the match: Kevin Pietersen (Eng)

- Australia won the toss and elected to bat.
- Play on Day 3 was reduced due to rain.

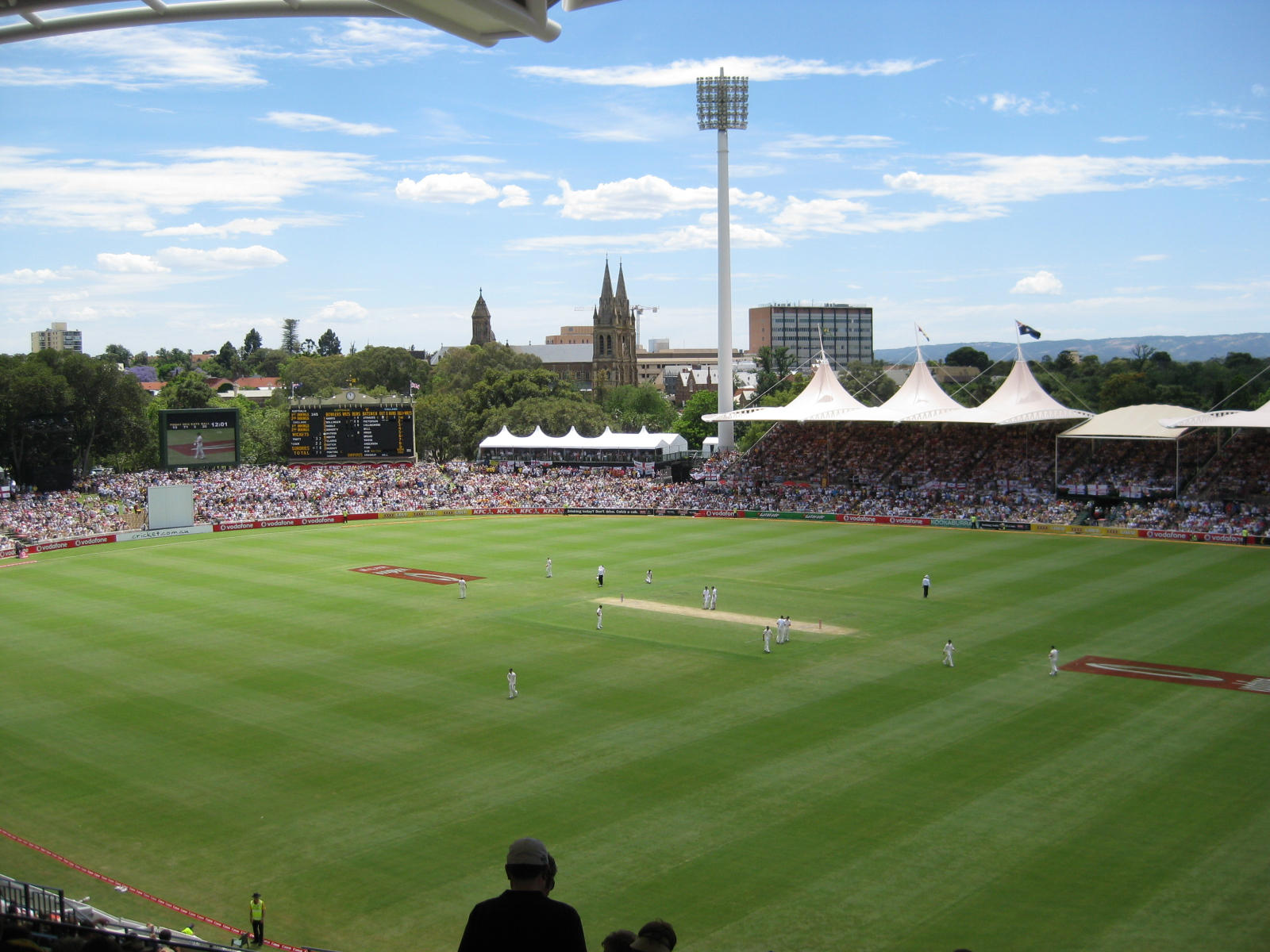
Players take the field at the Adelaide Oval during the second Test

For the second Test, Australia made two changes to its fast bowling attack; dropping Mitchell Johnson and Ben Hilfenhaus and bringing in Doug Bollinger and Ryan Harris. England fielded an unchanged side. After electing to bat first, Australia made their worst start to a Test match in 60 years. First, off the fourth ball of the match, Jonathan Trott ran out Simon Katich without facing a ball after Katich hesitated when Shane Watson called for a single and Trott registered a direct hit with just one stump to aim at. Katich's diamond duck was the first by an Australian since Wayne Phillips against the West Indies in Port of Spain in 1983-84. Anderson then had Ponting, playing in his 150th Test, caught by Graeme Swann at second slip with the next delivery for a golden duck. In his next over, the third of the match, Anderson then got Clarke to edge to Swann to leave Australia at 3/2. Michael Hussey made 93, ultimately the highest Australian score in the match, before Swann had him caught by Collingwood at slip. Watson also made 51 before Anderson had him caught by Kevin Pietersen at gully and Brad Haddin made 56 before Stuart Broad had him caught by Steven Finn after a miscue on a pull to end the innings as Australia were bowled out just before stumps on Day 1 for 245.

On the second day, England captain Andrew Strauss was dismissed for a single in the first over of the day's play, bowled by a Bollinger delivery that he left alone. At the close of day two, Alastair Cook had made 136 not out; when combined with his score of 235 not out in the second innings of the first Test, Cook broke the England records for runs scored (371) and minutes at the crease (1,022) without being dismissed. Trott also made 78 before Ryan Harris had him caught by Clarke.

Early on the third morning, Pietersen reached his first century since March 2009 before Cook was out for 148. Supported first by Paul Collingwood (42) and then Ian Bell (68 not out), Pietersen then reached the second double-century of his career and made a Test-best 227 before England declared on 5/620. This was the first time that the England team had passed the 500 run mark in successive innings in the Ashes and left Australia needing 375 runs to make England bat again.

Australia began batting early on day four and started a fightback. Watson made 51, meaning half centuries in both innings, before Finn had him caught by Strauss at slip and Clarke made 80 before Pietersen's part-time off-spin had him caught by Cook at short leg off the last ball of the day. Although Hussey completed a half-century, England took the final six wickets in the final morning session to win by an innings and 71 runs, beginning with Finn taking the key wicket of Hussey for 52 by getting him to miscue a pull shot to Anderson at mid-on. Anderson then claimed the next two, including notably Harris on a first-ball LBW. With two first-ball ducks, Harris became only the second Australian in Test cricket to earn a king pair (the first being Adam Gilchrist against India in Kolkata in 2000–01). Swann then provided the finishing touch with his 10th five-wicket haul in Tests and first against Australia by claiming the last three wickets of North lbw (originally not called but reversed upon review by DRS) and Doherty and Siddle both bowled. The result was the 100th time England had beaten Australia in a Test match.

=== Third Test ===
16–20 December 2010 (Note: While five days of play were scheduled for each Test, the third and fourth Tests reached a result within four days.)
Scorecard

Australia	v	England
268 (76 overs); Mitchell Johnson 62 (93); James Anderson 3/61 (20 overs)		187 (62.3 overs); Ian Bell 53 (90); Mitchell Johnson 6/38 (17.3 overs)
309 (86 overs); Michael Hussey 116 (172); Chris Tremlett 5/87 (24 overs)		123 (37 overs); Jonathan Trott 31 (61); Ryan Harris 6/47 (11 overs)

Australia won by 267 runs
WACA Ground, Perth
Umpires: Billy Doctrove (WI) and Marais Erasmus (SA)
Player of the match: Mitchell Johnson (Aus)

- England won the toss and elected to field.

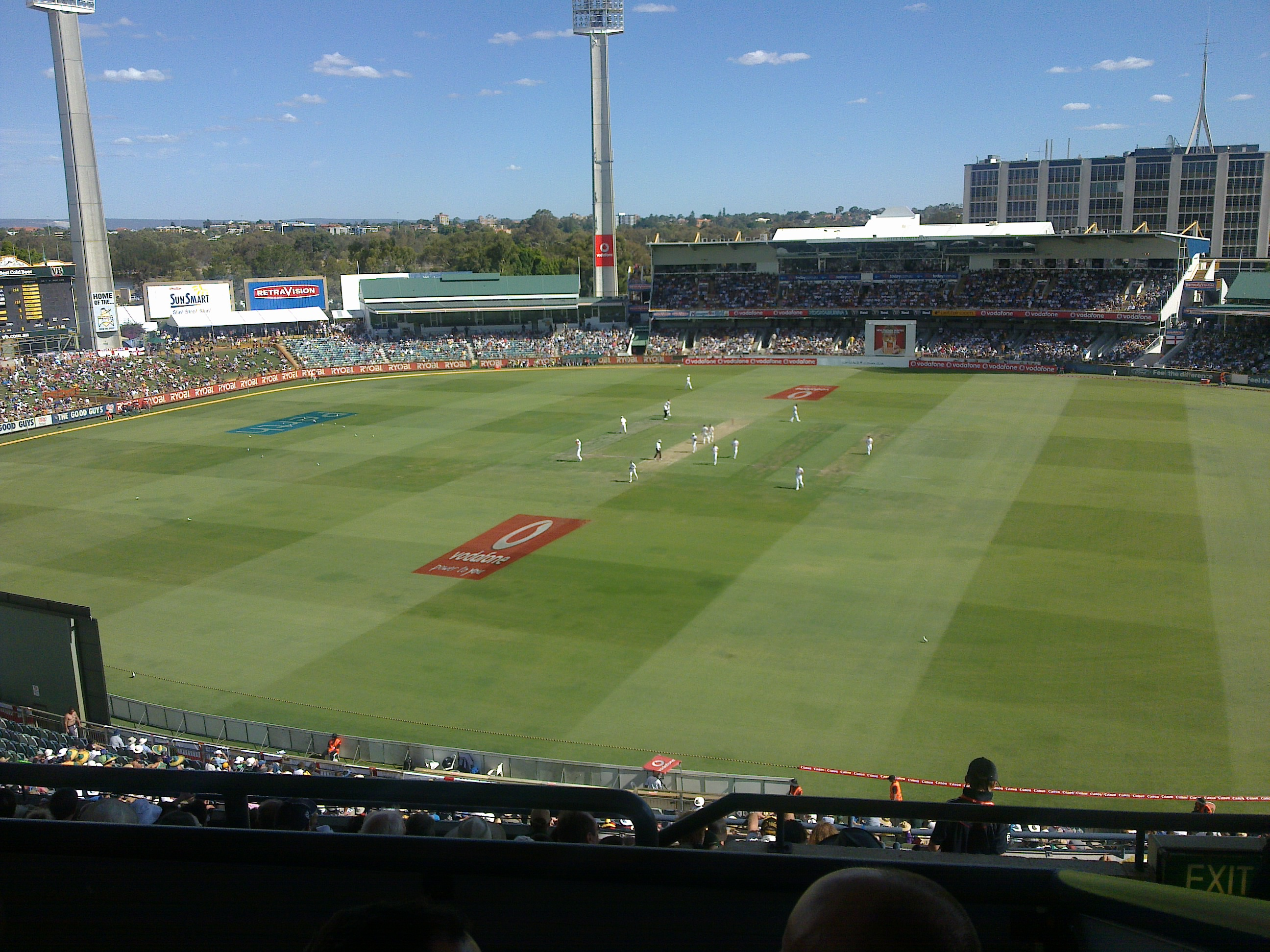
Australian openers on day 2 of the Third Test at the WACA Ground

Following an innings defeat, Australia made four changes, with pace bowlers Johnson and Hilfenhaus returning in place of Bollinger and Doherty, Steve Smith (at that time considered an all-rounder) replacing North in the middle-order, and opener Phillip Hughes replacing the injured Katich. Australia's bowling attack comprised four main pace bowlers and Smith as the main spinner. England made one change, with Chris Tremlett chosen to replace the injured Broad.

On the first day, Tremlett marked his return to Test cricket with three top-order wickets as Australia were reduced to 5/69. However, the middle-lower order rescued Australia with Michael Hussey, Brad Haddin and Mitchell Johnson scoring half-centuries. Australia were finally bowled out for 268 runs.

On the second day, England reached 0/78 before suffering a batting collapse with Johnson taking 6/38. In a spell costing just 7 runs, he accounted for Cook (32), Trott (4), Pietersen (0) and Collingwood (5) to leave England 5/98. Strauss and Bell made half-centuries before Johnson took two further wickets as England were all out for 187.

Starting their second innings with a lead of 81 runs, Australia lost Hughes, Ponting and Clarke cheaply before Hussey and Watson steadied the innings with a 113-run partnership. Watson fell five short of his century, but Hussey recorded his second century of the series before a late flurry of wickets left Australia being bowled out for 309. Hussey was last-man-out for 116 and that wicket completed Tremlett's maiden Test five-wicket haul.

Needing 391 runs for victory, England quickly collapsed to 5/81. Johnson picked up two more wickets, and Ben Hilfenhaus collected his first since the opening over of the series as the openers and Pietersen fell cheaply. Ricky Ponting damaged a finger parrying Trott to wicket-keeper Haddin in the penultimate over, before Paul Collingwood was caught behind off Harris from the last ball of the day. On day four, the remaining England batsmen were quickly bowled out within ten overs. The final five wickets fell for just 42 runs with Ryan Harris taking 6/47. England were all out for 123 and lost the game by 267 runs. For his combined 63 runs and 9/82, Johnson won the Man of the Match award.

=== Fourth Test ===
26–30 December 2010
Scorecard

Australia	v	England
98 (42.5 overs); Michael Clarke 20 (54); Chris Tremlett 4/26 (11.5 overs)		513 (159.1 overs); Jonathan Trott 168* (345); Peter Siddle 6/75 (33.1 overs)
258 (85.4 overs); Brad Haddin 55* (93); Tim Bresnan 4/50 (21.4 overs)

England won by an innings and 157 runs
Melbourne Cricket Ground, Melbourne
Umpires: Aleem Dar (Pak) and Tony Hill (NZ)
Player of the match: Jonathan Trott (Eng)

- England won the toss and elected to field.
- England won the match and got a leading 2-1 over australia with one match remaining.

Despite being the series' leading wicket-taker, Steven Finn was dropped by England for the much-anticipated Boxing Day Test and replaced by Tim Bresnan, who had been with Collingwood, Broad and Swann in the T20 side that had beaten Australia in the ICC World Twenty20 Final back in May. James Anderson was cleared to play after a slight side strain. Australia were unchanged, with Ricky Ponting also cleared to play despite a fractured little finger on his left hand.

Strauss won the toss and elected to bowl. Watson was dropped twice without scoring off Anderson before Tremlett claimed his wicket. Tremlett later had Ponting caught behind before Anderson took the vital wicket of Hussey, who had achieved at least fifty in every innings of the series, in the last over before lunch. None of the Australian batsmen offered much resistance as they were bowled out for 98 before tea: their lowest Ashes total at the MCG. All ten dismissals were catches behind the stumps, with Matt Prior becoming the fourth English wicket-keeper to take six catches in an innings; of the remaining catches, two were taken at slip and two at gully. Anderson and Tremlett took four wickets each while Bresnan took the remaining two.

In reply, England's openers advanced to 0/157 at the end of the first day's play before both fell early the following morning. Australia reviewed a caught-behind appeal for Pietersen when on 49, which upheld Aleem Dar's not out verdict; however, Ponting continued to debate the decision with both umpires and was fined 40% of his match fee. Pietersen was out soon after for 51 and was followed by Collingwood (8) and Bell (1). Prior was then given out caught behind early in his innings; however, Dar called for the third umpire for a suspected no ball. This was confirmed and Prior continued to support Trott, eventually making 85 while Trott achieved his fifth Test century and eventually finished not out on 168 as England reached 513 all out. Australia had a bright spot in Victoria native and state captain Siddle, who took a six-wicket haul, but they lost Harris for the rest of the series when he fractured his ankle in a run-up.

By the time they began their second innings, Australia were in a worse situation than at Adelaide, needing to make 415 runs just to make England bat again, a man down (Harris being unable to bat after his ankle injury), and with more than half the match left to play. Australia got off to a quick start before Hughes was run out off Swann's bowling. Bresnan then took three wickets – Watson lbw, captain Ponting bowled and Hussey caught for a duck – to leave Australia 104/4. Australia finished day 3 on 169/6, 246 runs behind. An 86-run partnership on the fourth morning between Haddin and Siddle delayed the inevitable, but after Swann had Siddle caught by Pietersen at long-on, Bresnan dismissed Hilfenhaus for a pair to seal the match. Australia were bowled out for 258 and England retained the Ashes, winning by an innings and 157 runs to go up 2–1 in the series with one match left to play.

The losses at Adelaide and Melbourne also meant that it was the first time that Australia had ever lost two Tests in a home series by an innings.

=== Fifth Test ===
3–7 January 2011
Scorecard

Australia	v	England
280 (106.1 overs); Mitchell Johnson 53 (66); James Anderson 4/66 (30.1 overs)		644 (177.5 overs); Alastair Cook 189 (342); Mitchell Johnson 4/168 (36 overs)
281 (84.4 overs); Steve Smith 54* (90); James Anderson 3/61 (18 overs)

England won by an innings and 83 runs
Sydney Cricket Ground, Sydney
Umpires: Aleem Dar (Pak) and Billy Bowden (NZ)
Player of the match: Alastair Cook (Eng)

- Australia won the toss and elected to bat.
- Play on Day 1 was reduced due to rain.
- Play on Day 5 was reduced due to rain.

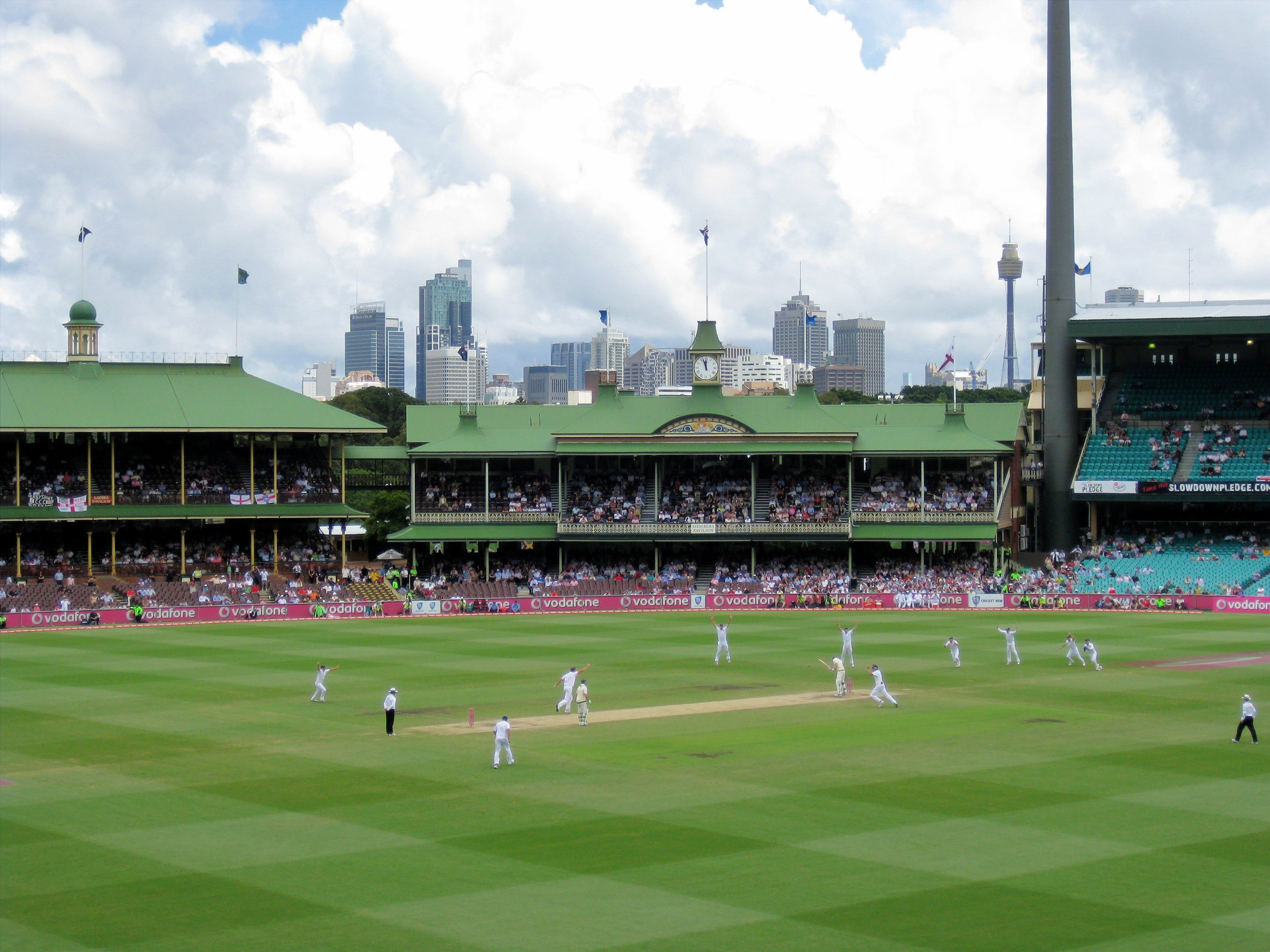
Chris Tremlett bowls Michael Beer to complete England's 3–1 Ashes victory

Prior to the fifth Test match, Ricky Ponting was declared unfit to play due to the injury to his left little finger. Michael Clarke became Australia's 43rd Test captain, while Brad Haddin assumed vice-captain responsibilities. Usman Khawaja made his Test debut in place of Ponting and became the first Pakistani Australian to play for Australia. Spinner Michael Beer also made his Test debut, and became the 10th spinner to feature in the Australian side since Shane Warne's retirement in 2007.

Clarke won the toss and elected to bat in overcast conditions. Watson, Hughes, Khawaja and Clarke all passed 30, but none of the top order reached a half-century. After Hussey was dismissed by all-rounder Collingwood, playing in his final Test having announced his retirement from Test cricket on the fourth morning, Smith and Siddle soon followed to leave Australia at 8/189. However, 53 from Johnson and 34 from Hilfenhaus allowed Australia finish on 280 all out.

England's openers batted positively, with Strauss making 60 off 58 balls before being bowled by Hilfenhaus. Fellow opener Cook continued his excellent form, making his third century and passing 700 runs for the series. After Cook departed for 189, Ian Bell made his first century in Ashes cricket in his 18th Test match against Australia. There was minor controversy when Bell overturned a caught-behind dismissal whilst on 67 – it was overturned because Hotspot showed no edge on the bat, but Snickometer (which was shown by the broadcaster, but at that time was not used in the referral process) detected an edge. After England passed 500 for the fourth time in the series, wicketkeeper Matt Prior reached his fourth Test hundred, his first against Australia, from just 109 balls – the fastest English Ashes century since Ian Botham in 1981 at Old Trafford. His century meant that six out of England's top seven had made centuries during the series. England reached 644 before being bowled out, their highest ever total in an Ashes Test in Australia.

Needing 364 to make England bat again, several Australian batsmen again made starts before getting out. Watson made a brisk 38 before a mix-up left both him and Hughes at the same end for an easy run-out, the third run-out of the series that he was involved in. Clarke scored 41 in his second innings as captain and Haddin made 30, but Tremlett then tempted Haddin into playing a bouncer behind to Prior before clean-bowling Johnson with his next delivery, prompting an extra half hour of play on Day 4. In an eighth-wicket partnership worth 80 runs, Smith made an unbeaten half-century and Siddle made 43; however, after Siddle was removed, Hilfenhaus soon departed for just 7 before Tremlett took the final wicket: Beer bowled, playing on, for 2. Australia's total was 281 and England won by an innings and 83 runs. This was the third time they had won by an innings in the series – the first time a touring side had ever won three Tests by an innings during a single series.

Cook was named Man of the Series after amassing 766 runs for England at a staggering average of 127.66, and also Man of the Match for his 189 runs in the first innings.

== Statistics ==
=== Individual ===
Statistic	England		Australia	
Most runs	Alastair Cook	766	Michael Hussey	570
Highest innings	Alastair Cook	235*	Michael Hussey	195
Highest batting average	Alastair Cook	127.66	Michael Hussey	63.33
Most centuries	Alastair Cook	3	Michael Hussey	2
Most fifties	Ian Bell; Andrew Strauss	3	Shane Watson	4
Most fours	Alastair Cook	81	Michael Hussey	67
Most sixes	Matt Prior	2	Peter Siddle; Brad Haddin	5
Most wickets	James Anderson	24	Mitchell Johnson	15
Most five-wicket hauls	Steven Finn; Graeme Swann; Chris Tremlett	1	Peter Siddle	2
Best innings figures	Steven Finn	33.4–1–125–6	Mitchell Johnson	17.3–5–38–6
Best bowling average (specialist bowlers only)	Tim Bresnan	19.54	Ryan Harris	25.54
Most catches (wicket-keepers excluded)	Paul Collingwood	9	Michael Hussey	5
Most dismissals (wicket-keepers only)	Matt Prior	23 (23c/0st)	Brad Haddin	9 (8c/1st)

=== Team ===
Statistic	England	Australia
Highest team innings	644	481
Lowest team innings	123	98

=== Other ===
England

- In the 2nd innings of the 1st Test, Alastair Cook achieved his maiden Test double-century and his then highest Test score of 235 (not out). This was also the highest Test innings score for a batsman at the Gabba.
- In the 1st innings of the 2nd Test, Ian Bell reached a career total of 4,000 runs when he scored 68 (not out).
- In the 1st innings of the 2nd Test, Kevin Pietersen hit 227, his highest Test score.
- In the 2nd innings of the 3rd Test, James Anderson reached a career total of 200 wickets when he had Peter Siddle caught out.
- In the 2nd innings of the 3rd Test, Chris Tremlett achieved his first five-wicket haul.
- In the 1st innings of the 4th Test, Andrew Strauss reached a career total of 6,000 runs.
- In the 1st innings of the 4th Test, Matt Prior reached a career total of 2,000 runs.
- In the 1st innings of the 5th Test, Alastair Cook reached a career total of 5,000 runs; he was the second-youngest player to reach this landmark, after Sachin Tendulkar. He also made his third century of the series and stands as the series' highest run-scorer.
- In the 1st innings of the 5th Test, England scored their highest team total ever in Australia.
- In the 1st innings of the 5th Test, England's 6th, 7th and 8th wicket partnerships all made 100, the first time this has ever happened in Test cricket.
- England amassed a total of nine centuries off six batsmen. This is a record for England in the Ashes.
- England surpassed 500 runs four times. This is the first time they had done so in any series.
- England became the first touring team to win three matches by an innings in a Test series.
- England won the Ashes in Australia for the first time in 24 years.

Australia

- In the 1st innings of the 1st Test, Peter Siddle took a hat-trick. This was the first Test hat-trick by an Australian since Glenn McGrath in 2000 and the first in an Ashes series since Darren Gough in 1999. Overall, it was the 38th Test hat-trick, the 11th by an Australian, and the 9th by a Victorian. The hat-trick was taken on his 26th birthday, 25 November 2010.
- In the 2nd innings of the 3rd Test, Ryan Harris achieved his first five-wicket haul.
- Australia's first-innings total of 98 in the 4th Test was its lowest first-innings ever in a Melbourne Test and its lowest completed first innings score in a home Ashes Test since 1936.
- Captain Ricky Ponting averaged 16.14 runs across the series, the lowest average by an Australian captain in an Ashes series in Australia since Brian Booth in 1965–66.

== Media ==
=== Television ===
- Nine Network: Australia
- Sky Sports: United Kingdom and Ireland (HD) Highlights ITV4 (Note: Under a separate deal negotiated with Cricket Australia, highlights of the series were aired on the terrestrial broadcaster ITV.)
- Star Cricket: India and Bangladesh
- Willow Cricket: USA
- GEO Super: Pakistan
- SuperSport: South Africa, Zimbabwe and Kenya
- Sky Network Television: New Zealand (HD)
- Asian Television Network: Canada
- Orbit Showtime: Middle East

=== Radio ===
- ABC Radio Grandstand: Australia
- BBC Radio 4 and BBC Radio 5 Live Sports Extra: England
