= Ajmal Shahzad =

English cricket player/coach (born 1985)

Personal information
- Born: 27 July 1985 (age 41); Huddersfield, West Yorkshire, England
- Height: 6 ft 0 in (1.83 m)
- Batting: Right-handed
- Bowling: Right-arm fast-medium
- Role: Bowler

International information
- National side: England
- Only Test (cap 650): 4 June 2010 v Bangladesh
- ODI debut (cap 216): 5 March 2010 v Bangladesh
- Last ODI: 27 February 2011 v India
- ODI shirt no.: 13

Domestic team information
- Years: Team
- 2004–2012: Yorkshire (squad no. 4)
- 2012: → Lancashire (on loan)
- 2013–2014: Nottinghamshire (squad no. 1)
- 2015–2017: Sussex (squad no. 4)
- 2017: Leicestershire

Career statistics
Competition	Test	ODI	FC	LA
Matches	1	11	97	87
Runs scored	5	39	2,237	548
Batting average	5.00	6.50	23.06	14.05
100s/50s	0/0	0/0	0/6	0/1
Top score	5	9	88	59*
Balls bowled	102	588	15,073	3,886
Wickets	4	17	249	120
Bowling average	15.75	28.82	34.97	29.69
5 wickets in innings	0	0	4	1
10 wickets in match	0	0	0	0
Best bowling	3/45	3/41	5/46	5/51
Catches/stumpings	2/–	4/–	16/–	20/–
- Source: ESPNcricinfo, 16 September 2017

Ajmal Shahzad (born 27 July 1985) is an English cricket coach and retired cricketer. He was a member of the England team that won the 2010 ICC World Twenty20.

As a right-arm fast bowler, he played first class cricket for five counties Yorkshire, Lancashire, Nottinghamshire, Sussex and Leicestershire between 2004 and 2017.

Shahzad made his international debut for England in a Twenty20 International in February 2010. He went on to play 3 Twenty20 internationals, 11 One Day Internationals and one Test match (against Bangladesh in 2010) for his country.

== Family and education ==
Ajmal Shahzad grew up in Bradford, where he attended Bradford Grammar School and Woodhouse Grove School; he lived close to fellow cricketer Adil Rashid. Shahzad studied four months of pharmacy at Bradford University before transferring to Leeds Metropolitan University to study sports science to enhance his cricket career.

== Domestic career ==
In 2004, he became the first Yorkshire-born player of Asian extraction to play for Yorkshire.

In 2009, Shahzad took 40 wickets and scored 445 runs in the lower middle order. His performances gained him a call up to the England performance squad on a tour of South Africa.

In the 2011 County Championship he managed 25 wickets at a bowling average of 41.00. In September, Shahzad was reprimanded for scuffing the pitch during the penultimate Championship match against Warwickshire and fined £750. Shahzad regretted the incident, explaining "It's not the way I want to play my game. I don't want to be seen as a cheat, or a pitch-damager. ... It's one mistake I've made in an eight- or nine-year career so far. It's out of the blue for me, and I definitely would never do anything like it again. It was just a random, stupid act."

In April 2012 Yorkshire's new head coach, Jason Gillespie, praised Shahzad's efforts, saying "Ajmal has got himself in as good a condition as he's ever been in his first-class career. He's worked incredibly hard, and I think he's a fantastic bowler, a very exciting bowler." However, on 1 May 2012, it was announced that Shahzad was to leave Yorkshire and a week later he joined Lancashire on loan for the rest of the season.

On 10 October 2012, having been told he was free to leave Yorkshire, Shahzad signed a three-year contract to join Nottinghamshire.

On 7 November 2014, he was released a year early from his Nottinghamshire contract and signed a three-year contract with Sussex.

On 10 July 2017, Shahzad departed Sussex after his contract was terminated by mutual agreement.

== International career ==
In January 2010, he was named in the Test and ODI squads for the England tour of Bangladesh. On his debut for England in a Twenty20 International against Pakistan, he claimed two wickets, both in his first over. He then made his ODI début against Bangladesh, again taking a wicket in his first over.

When Bangladesh toured England a few months later, he made his Test debut in the second Test, replacing the injured Tim Bresnan. After only scoring 5 runs in England's innings and an expensive first bowling spell, he took 3 wickets in 3 overs in his second spell as Bangladesh failed to reach the follow-on target. Pakistan toured England in July and Shahzad was included in England's 12-man squad for the first Test. A week before the match, he twisted his ankle whilst playing for Yorkshire. As he was still experiencing discomfort the day before the Test, England chose to play Tim Bresnan instead of Shahzad.

Shahzad was included in the performance squad who were training in Australia for the 2011 Ashes and ready to provide cover in the event of injuries. He was not called upon in the Tests, but played two T20Is against Australia and the first five of the seven ODIs that followed. He took 6 wickets at an average of 40.50 before a hamstring injury in the fifth match ruled him out of the rest of the series.

Shahzad was included in England's 15-man squad for the 2011 ICC World Cup held in Bangladesh, India, and Sri Lanka in March 2011. He managed three wickets from two appearances in the tournament, but suffered a recurrence of the hamstring injury against Australia forcing him out of the tournament prematurely.

On his return to Yorkshire, he struggled for form so was left out of the England Test and ODI squads to face Sri Lanka in 2011. He was selected in the England Performance Programme held over the 2011-12 English off-season, but never played international cricket again.

== Post-playing career ==
Following his playing career, Shahzad initially became an assistant coach at Marylebone Cricket Club's Young Cricketers. He succeeded Steve Kirby as the club's Head Coach in February 2019. Two years later he joined Derbyshire as an Assistant Coach with a focus on bowling.
