= Chris Tremlett =

English cricketer (born 1981)

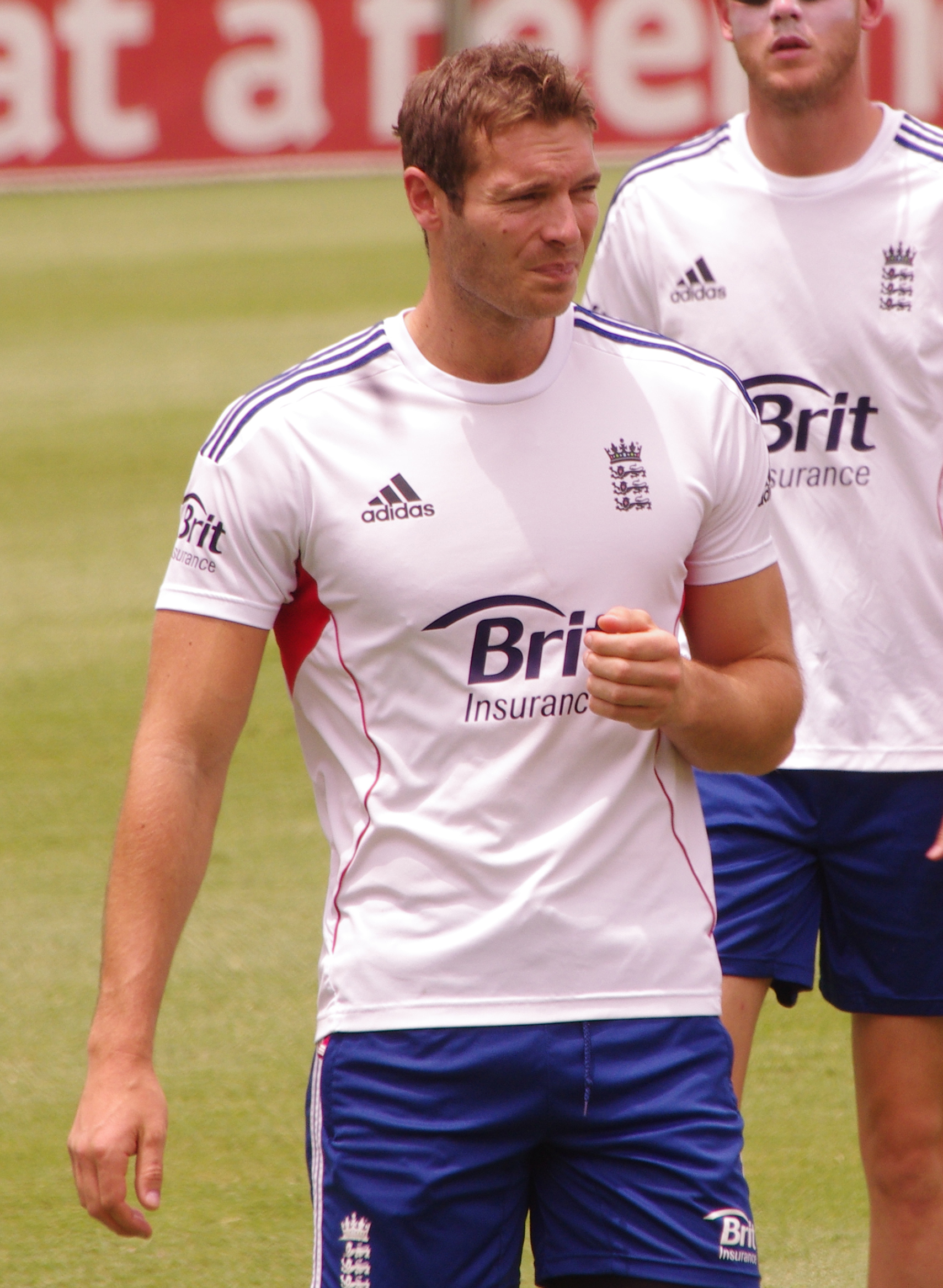
- Tremlett in 2014

Personal information
- Full name: Christopher Timothy Tremlett
- Born: 2 September 1981 (age 45); Southampton, Hampshire, England
- Height: 6 ft 7 in (201 cm)
- Batting: Right-handed
- Bowling: Right arm fast-medium
- Role: Bowler
- Relatives: Tim Tremlett (father); Maurice Tremlett (grandfather)

International information
- National side: England (2005–2013)
- Test debut (cap 636): 19 July 2007 v India
- Last Test: 21 November 2013 v Australia
- ODI debut (cap 189): 21 June 2005 v Bangladesh
- Last ODI: 26 March 2011 v Sri Lanka
- ODI shirt no.: 33

Domestic team information
- Years: Team
- 2000: Hampshire Cricket Board
- 2000–2009: Hampshire (squad no. 22)
- 2010–2015: Surrey (squad no. 33)

Career statistics
Competition	Test	ODI	FC	LA
Matches	12	15	146	133
Runs scored	113	50	2,462	563
Batting average	10.27	7.14	17.84	10.05
100s/50s	0/0	0/0	0/10	0/0
Top score	25*	19*	90	38*
Balls bowled	2,902	784	25,154	6,129
Wickets	53	15	459	180
Bowling average	27.00	47.00	28.66	27.78
5 wickets in innings	2	0	13	0
10 wickets in match	0	0	0	0
Best bowling	6/48	4/32	8/96	4/25
Catches/stumpings	4/–	4/–	38/–	27/–
- Source: ESPNcricinfo, 10 May 2024

Christopher Timothy Tremlett (born 2 September 1981) is a former English cricketer who played international cricket for England and domestically for Hampshire and Surrey. He was a 6 feet 7 inches (2.01 m) tall fast-medium bowler able to extract bounce on most surfaces. Tremlett started his playing career with Hampshire in 2000 and was awarded his county cap in 2004. He made his One Day International debut in 2005, and two years later played his first Test. Tremlett played three Tests in 2007 before injury interrupted.

Tremlett moved to Surrey for the start of 2010 after struggling with injury. Following this move, he forced his way back into the Test team and participated in England's victory in the 2010–11 Ashes in Australia. He was a competent number 8 or 9 batsman, with seven first-class fifties to his name and has a strong arm from the deep.

He retired from all forms of cricket on 21 August 2015 due to injury. Tremlett had been affected by back and knee injuries in more recent years and was restricted to three Championship appearances for Surrey in 2015. In retirement he took up weightlifting and in June 2017 he shared a picture of his body transformation which went viral on the internet.

== Domestic career and early England years ==
Tremlett started career at Hursley Park CC. Tremlett took a wicket with his first ball in first-class cricket against New Zealand A in 1999, dismissing Mark Richardson. He went to India with the Under-19s in 2000/01, and was one of the first cricketers to attend the ECB Academy the following year.

Tremlett won the NBC Denis Compton Award in both 2000 and 2001. His grandfather Maurice played three times for England in the 1940s and also for Somerset, while his father Tim turned a playing career into a coaching job at Hampshire, and has coached his son during Chris's entire professional career.

In 2005 he made his England debut in a One Day International against Bangladesh at Trent Bridge, Nottingham, taking 4–32 and missing out on a hat-trick only by a freak occurrence: the hat-trick ball fell onto the top of Mohammad Ashraful's stumps, but did not dislodge a bail. To demonstrate his continuing progress Tremlett was regularly selected in England's 12 for the Ashes Tests later in 2005 but due to the success and consistency of the first choice bowlers he did not make his debut. He was also selected for the 2005–06 season tour to Pakistan, but had to withdraw because of injury. After undergoing surgery to his right knee and hip, he also missed the tour to India.

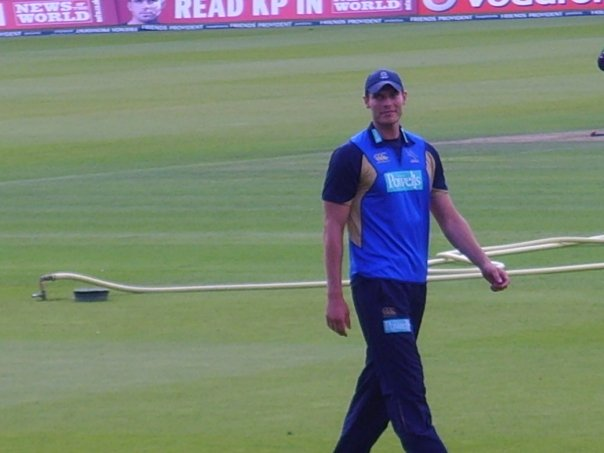
Tremlett was part of the Hampshire team that won the 2009 Friends Provident Trophy final (seen here during the final).

Tremlett was in and out of the Hampshire team in April and May, playing two Championship matches against Sussex and Warwickshire, and taking four wickets, and was then diagnosed with a side strain. He returned to take six wickets in seven matches in Hampshire's Twenty20 Cup campaign, and featured in four more Championship matches, to bring his tally for the season to 30 wickets at a bowling average of 21.70, the lowest at the club, including a spell of six for 89 in a two-wicket loss to Warwickshire.

After struggling with injury and form in 2009 at Hampshire, Tremlett left to join Surrey on a three-year contract. The pitches at the Rose Bowl were not suited to Tremlett's bowling style, and it was felt that The Oval would be a more fruitful hunting ground. The end of the 2009 season saw a great deal of change in Surrey's squad, with nine players leaving; Tremlett was the fifth player to join the club before the start of the 2010 season. Tremlett was selected by the MCC to play against Durham, the champion county, in March 2010 but was withdrawn on the insistence of Surrey manager Chris Adams to minimise the risk of injury early in Surrey's season.

== Test career ==
After cutting down his run up and increasing his pace through work with Hampshire teammates Shane Warne and Stuart Clark, Tremlett came back into Test contention in 2007 after a rash of injuries to established bowlers. He played for the England Lions against India in their final warm up game before the first Test and finally made his Test début at Lords against India on 19 July 2007 after Matthew Hoggard was ruled out with a back complaint. His grandfather having played Test cricket, Chris Tremlett became the fourth grandson of a Test cricketer to make a Test debut without his father having also played Tests. He is also the first Hampshire born Hampshire county cricketer to play a Test in England. He made a pair on debut, but took 4 wickets and during his second match, he took 3 wickets in each innings, and finished with figures of 3/12 as India cruised to a 7-wicket victory needing just 73 to win.

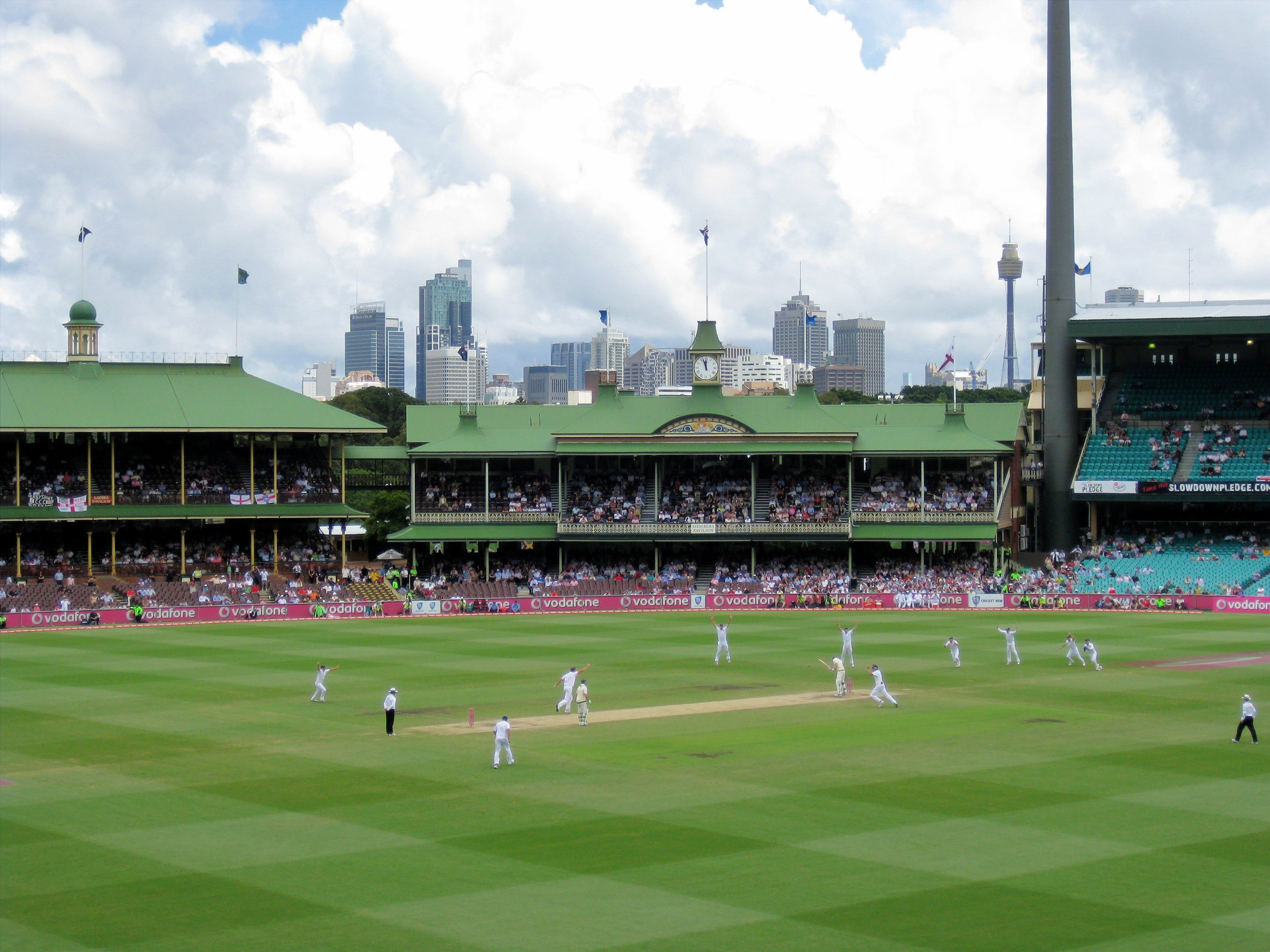
Chris Tremlett bowls Michael Beer to complete England's 3–1 victory in the 2010–11 Ashes

He was selected for the squad for the 2010 Ashes tour to Australia. He was not selected to play in either of the first two tests, but in the first day of the third test, held at Perth, he took 3 wickets for 63 runs, troubling the Australian top order with the steepling bounce allowed for by the WACA surface. He followed that up with 5 for 87 in the Australian second innings. On the first day of the fourth test, the Boxing Day Test held at the MCG, he took 4 for 26 as England skittled Australia out for 98 runs. He took the last wicket in the last test, and with it, England won the series.

During the summer of 2011, in the third match against Sri Lanka, he took his best Test figures of 6/48 as England bowled out Sri Lanka for 184. With 15 dismissals, Tremlett finished as the leading wicket-taker in the series on either side. India toured in July for four Tests, five ODIs, and a T20I. Selected for the opening match of the Test series, Tremlett took 4/124 in England's victory, extracting bounce from the Lord's pitch to trouble the Indian batsmen. However, he was hampered by injury with a hamstring problem on the fourth day of the first Test and a back spasm during pre-match training ahead of the second Test. The back injury prevented Tremlett from playing any further part in the series. In September, for the first time Tremlett was awarded one of 13 central contracts with the England and Wales Cricket Board (ECB) until September 2012.

After testing his fitness in November 2011, he was included in England's squad to play Pakistan in the UAE in the following January. While Tremlett was absent through injury, Tim Bresnan established himself in the team and Tremlett was left competing with Steven Finn for a place in the team. Bresnan suffered an injury and Tremlett was selected in his place for the first Test. However, a back injury ended his tour before the second Test. Examinations revealed the problem was a bulging disc and in February Tremlett underwent surgery.
