= Tim Bresnan =

English cricketer (born 1985)

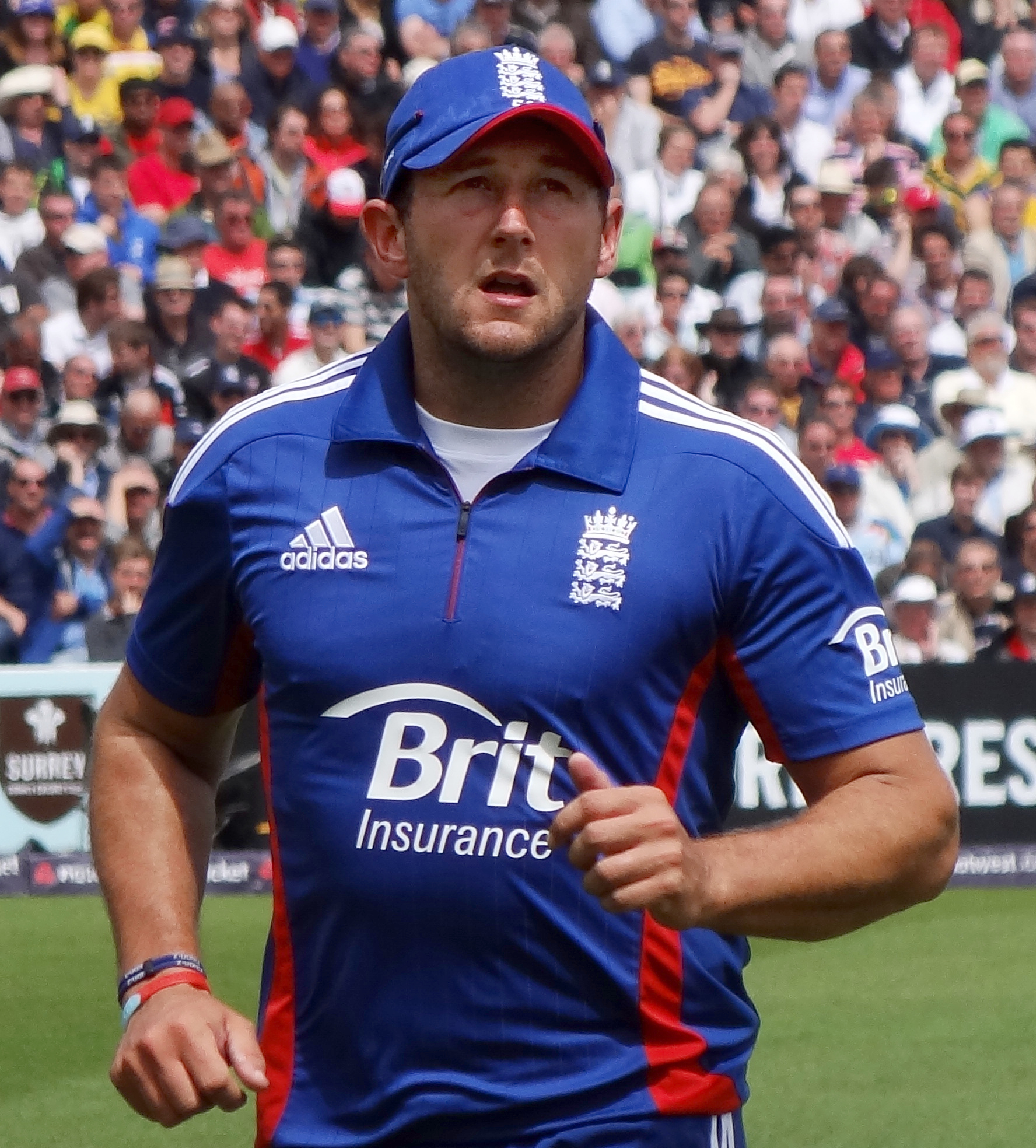

Personal information
- Full name: Timothy Thomas Bresnan
- Born: 28 February 1985 (age 41); Pontefract, West Yorkshire, England
- Nickname: Brez
- Height: 6 ft 0 in (1.83 m)
- Batting: Right-handed
- Bowling: Right-arm fast-medium
- Role: All-rounder

International information
- National side: England (2006–2015)
- Test debut (cap 643): 6 May 2009 v West Indies
- Last Test: 26 December 2013 v Australia
- ODI debut (cap 194): 17 June 2006 v Sri Lanka
- Last ODI: 8 May 2015 v Ireland
- ODI shirt no.: 20
- T20I debut (cap 12): 15 June 2006 v Australia
- Last T20I: 31 March 2014 v Netherlands

Domestic team information
- Years: Team
- 2001–2019: Yorkshire (squad no. 16)
- 2014/15: Hobart Hurricanes
- 2016/17–2017/18: Perth Scorchers
- 2017/18: Sylhet Sixers
- 2020–2021: Warwickshire

Career statistics
Competition	Test	ODI	FC	LA
Matches	23	85	213	281
Runs scored	575	871	7,128	3,240
Batting average	26.13	19.79	28.62	21.60
100s/50s	0/3	0/1	7/36	0/10
Top score	91	80	169*	95*
Balls bowled	4,674	4,221	34,594	12,446
Wickets	72	109	575	316
Bowling average	32.73	34.98	30.99	34.52
5 wickets in innings	1	1	9	1
10 wickets in match	0	0	0	0
Best bowling	5/48	5/48	5/28	5/48
Catches/stumpings	8/–	20/–	125/–	74/–
- Source: ESPNcricinfo, 1 October 2021

Timothy Thomas Bresnan (born 28 February 1985) is an English former first-class cricketer, who last played for Warwickshire. He played as a fast-medium bowler who had ability with the bat. He was a member of the England team that won the 2010 ICC World Twenty20.

Bresnan won the NBC Denis Compton Award in 2002 and 2003. In June 2006 he was called up to the England One-Day International side, and in May 2009, he joined the Test side. He was selected for the 2010–11 Ashes series and played in the Boxing Day Test at the MCG; he took six wickets including the final one which saw England retain the Ashes. He announced his retirement from cricket in January 2022.

== Early and personal life ==
Born to Ray and Julie Bresnan, Bresnan attended Castleford High School Technology and Sports College, and subsequently attended NEW College, Pontefract. He started his career and played his junior cricket at Townville Cricket Club, before moving to Castleford Cricket Club as he began to play within the Yorkshire setup.

== County cricket ==
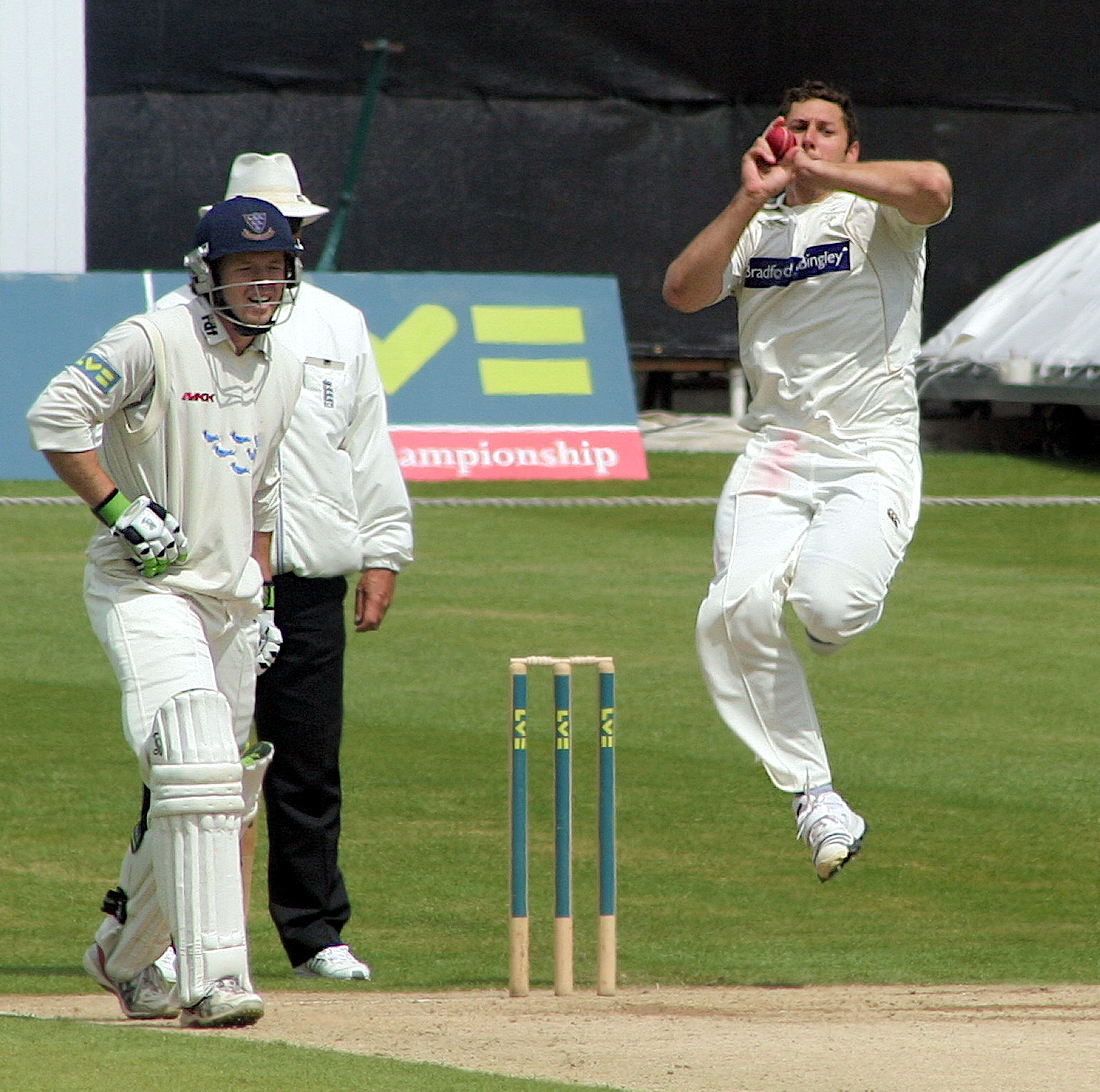
Bresnan bowling for Yorkshire at Headingley against Sussex in 2009

Bresnan made his maiden first-class century in April 2007 during a County Championship match against Surrey at The Oval, beating his previous highest score of 94. During the innings, he also passed the landmark of 1,000 runs in first-class cricket. Bresnan scored 116 and in doing so, alongside Jason Gillespie, set a record ninth-wicket partnership for Yorkshire: the pair put on 246 before Bresnan was stumped off the bowling of Nayan Doshi. It was the fourth-highest ninth-wicket partnership in all first-class cricket In July Bresnan scored his second first-class ton, this time for England Lions against a touring Indian team which included Zaheer Khan, Ishant Sharma, and Sreesanth. His innings of 126 not out was a new personal best.

Bresnan finished the 2007 English season with 679 runs from 16 first-class matches at an average of 48.50 with three centuries. He also took 35 wickets at an average of 34.02.

In 2017 during the T20 Blast roses match against Lancashire, Bresnan took 6 for 19, the best T20 bowling figures by a Yorkshire player and the best T20 figures at Headingley.

In June 2020, Bresnan agreed to leave Yorkshire County Cricket Club, in a bid to play first-team cricket elsewhere to prolong his career. He joined Warwickshire on loan for the 2020 season, and signed a two-year permanent deal with the club for the 2021 and 2022 seasons. In January 2022, Bresnan retired from the sport.

== International career ==
=== 2006 Sri Lanka ===
Bresnan represented England at youth level, with 7 Youth Tests and 23 Youth ODIs for England U-19s. He earned his first international call-up in June 2006 when he was named in the England ODI squad to play Ireland and Sri Lanka. Bresnan made his England debut in the Twenty20 international against Sri Lanka at the Rose Bowl on 15 June 2006. He scored 6 not out and conceded 20 runs from his two overs. Two days later he appeared in his first One Day International against the same opposition at Lord's, taking 1–44 from nine overs as England fell to a 20-run defeat.

=== 2009 West Indies ===
On 29 April 2009, nearly three years since last being involved in international cricket, Bresnan was named in the England squad for the upcoming Test series against West Indies, replacing the injured Andrew Flintoff. Seven days later Bresnan made his Test debut for England at Lord's. He scored nine with the bat, and failed to take a wicket – being allocated only a few overs given the success of Stuart Broad, James Anderson and fellow débutant Graham Onions. In the second match, however, Bresnan picked up three wickets, including his maiden wicket of Brendan Nash and then took Denesh Ramdin two deliveries later.

=== 2009 South Africa ===
Bresnan played in the limited overs matches in England's tour of South Africa. He played in the second and third ODIs. In the second match, he took figures of 2–46 in ten overs and was not needed to bat. In the next game he bowled 8 overs for just 15 runs, picking up a wicket in the process, as England won by seven wickets. In the first T20 match he was expensive, bowling 2 overs for 25 runs. He was expensive again in the second bowling his four overs for 48 runs and being dismissed for a duck when batting as England lost by 84 runs.

=== 2010 Bangladesh ===
Bresnan was called up to the squad for the series in Bangladesh. In the first match he took four wickets, including 3–63. He also made 91 runs before being stumped. As England won comfortably, he was not required to bat again. In the second match he took another three wickets as he continues to impress with the ball. He also performed well in the limited overs series, picking up figures of 3–51 and 4–28 in the second and third matches. After the series in Bangladesh, Bangladesh toured England for two Test matches. He scored 25 runs and took 3 wickets as England won the match at Lords, but Bresnan was ruled out of the second match through injury.

=== 2010 Twenty20 World Cup ===
England then took part in the 2010 ICC World Twenty20 and Bresnan played in all their matches, culminating with victory over Australia in the final; this was the first time England had won an ICC tournament. In the first game of the tournament, Bresnan played a limited role, not being required to bat and only bowling 1 over for 7 runs. In the second match of huge tournament he bowled two overs against Ireland, conceding only 5 runs. He was expensive against Pakistan, bowling four overs for 36 runs, but came back well against South Africa, conceding just 14 runs in the three overs he bowled.

He guided England to victory against New Zealand with an unbeaten 23 to ensure England qualified for the semi-finals. In the semi-finals against Sri Lanka he was expensive, collecting figures of 1–41. In the final against Australia, he bowled all four of his overs, conceding 35 runs and not managing to pick up a wicket. Bresnan only took 3 wickets at 52.67, the least of England's front-line bowlers.

=== 2010–11 Australia ===
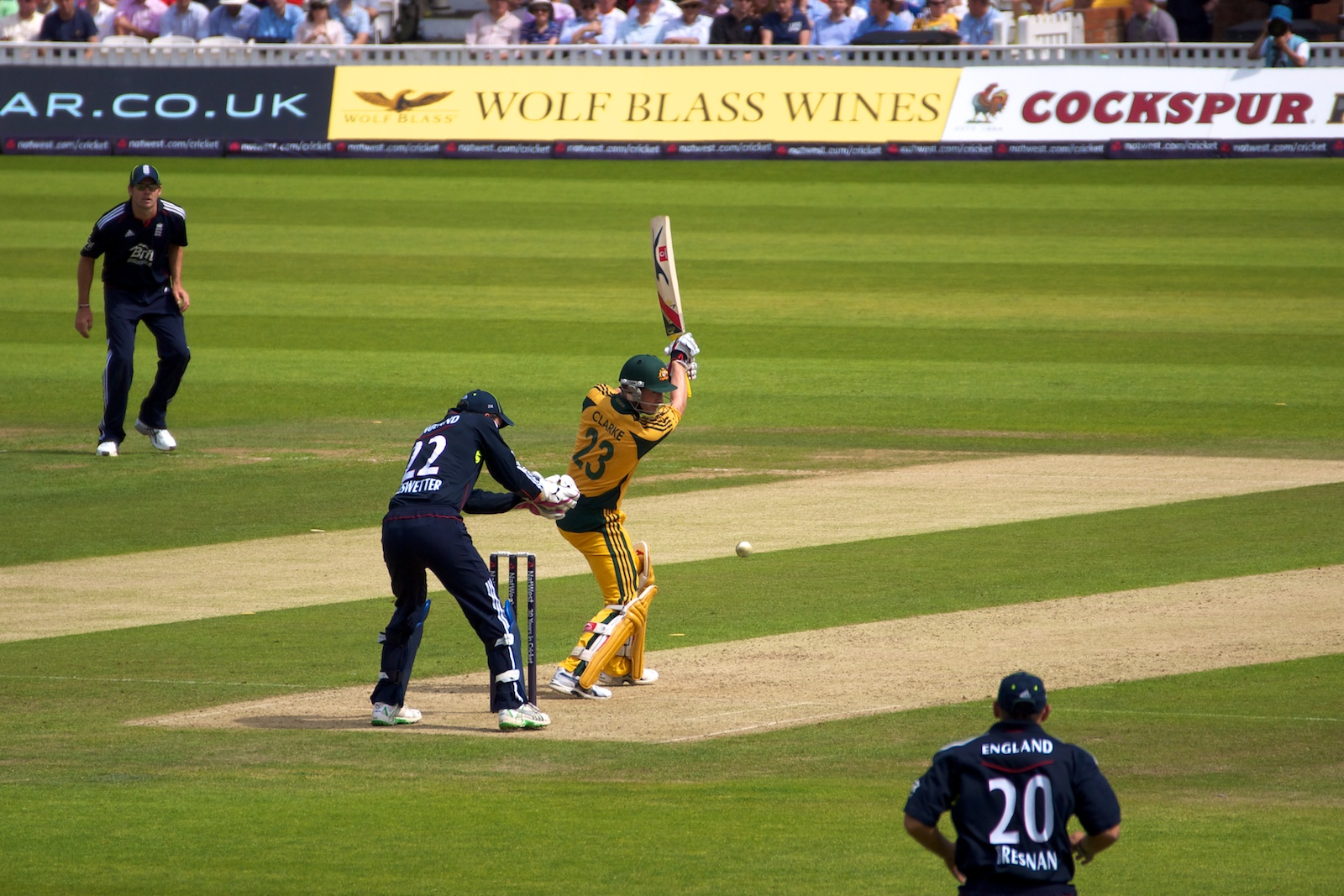
Bresnan (bottom right) fielding against Australia in a One Day International in June 2010. Michael Clarke is the batsman.

In the ODI series against Australia, Bresnan struggled with the ball, taking just 1 wicket in 5 games. In the first two games he took 0–49 and in the second 0–44. His only wicket came in the fourth match where he took figures of 1–52. However, he scored vital runs in England's three victories – 26 in the first game, 12 not out in the second and 14 not out in the third game which England won by just 1 wicket. His top score of the series came when he hit 34 in the fifth ODI.

He was included in the Ashes squad to tour Australia in 2010–2011, making his first appearance in the series in the fourth Test at the MCG in Melbourne. He bowled economically, taking 2/25 off 13 overs in the first innings as Australia were bowled out for just 98. In the second innings, he took the top-order wickets of Ricky Ponting, Shane Watson and Michael Hussey before taking the final wicket of Ben Hilfenhaus. That final wicket saw England win by an innings and 157 runs, take a 2–1 lead in the series and therefore retain the Ashes. He continued his capable performance in the final Test in Sydney, ably supporting James Anderson and Chris Tremlett as England clinched a 3–1 series win in dominating fashion.

Spinner Graeme Swann was injured during the ODI series that followed the Ashes, and Anderson was rested for the first three matches. As a result, Bresnan was left as the bowler with most international experience in England's attack, with 38 wickets in ODIs. England lost the series 6–1 with Bresnan playing two matches and contributing four wickets and 47 runs.

=== 2011 World Cup ===
An injury to his calf forced Bresnan out of the series with Australia, however he returned to the squad for the World Cup, held in February to April 2011. He took 1–49 as England got of to a winning start against the Netherlands. Bresnan took career best figures of 5/48 in England's tied match against India. His spell was nominated to be one of the best ODI bowling performance of the year 2011 by ESPNCricinfo. In disappointing defeat against Ireland, Bresnan bowled his 10 overs for 64 runs, picking up just 1 wicket. He bowled 8 overs for just 27 runs as England beat South Africa by six runs. He again bowled economically against Bangladesh, taking figures of 1–35 in his ten overs. He was expensive against the West Indies, bowling his seven overs for 46 runs and failing to pick up a wicket. England left the competition at the quarter-final stage, with Bresnan not picking up a wicket and conceding 40 runs in his eight overs.

=== 2011 India ===
The 2011 English cricket season began in April. Bresnan suffered a recurrence of his calf injury and as a result was ruled out of England's three-match Test series against Sri Lanka.

His return to fitness saw Bresnan pressuring the out of form Stuart Broad for the all-rounder's berth in the Test team, however it was an injury to seamer Chris Tremlett ahead of the second Test that allowed Bresnan back into the side for the first time since the Ashes. Bresnan's all-round effort, which included an innings of 90 and Test-best bowling figures of 5/48, helped England secure a 319-run win over India and go 2–0 up in the series. His haul of 5/48 was the first time Bresnan has taken five wickets in a Test innings. In the third test he took figures of 4–62 and also chipped in with an unbeaten 53 as England went 3–0 up in the series to claim the Number One Test ranking. In the final match of the series he took 3–54 to consolidate his place as England's third seamer and help the team win the series 4–0.

In September, for the first time Bresnan was awarded one of 13 central contracts with the England and Wales Cricket Board (ECB) until September 2012.

Bresnan also played in all of the ODIs hosted in England. In the first game he took figures of 2–54 and followed this up with figures of 3–43 in the second match. In the third ODI he bowled economically, taking 1–32 from ten overs as England wrapped up the series 3–0. He remained wicket less in the final two matches of the series, although England still went on to win the series 5–0 to complete a memorable summer. When England toured India in October for five ODIs, Anderson was rested and Broad was injured, leaving Bresnan as the team's most experienced fast bowler. England slumped to a 5–0 defeat. In the first match he scored just four runs and remained wicket less. In the second match he picked up two wickets but again struggled with the bat. In the third match he did not bat but picked up figures of 2–62, although these came of 7.2 overs. He made 45, his top score of the series in the fourth match but failed to take a wicket. In the final match of the series he bowled economically, picking up figures of 1–36 in 9 overs. During this whitewash Bresnan suffered problems with his elbow. He subsequently underwent surgery to remove a bone fragment from his elbow.

=== 2011–12 Pakistan and Sri Lanka ===
Though included in England's touring party in January 2012 for the Test series against Pakistan in the UAE Bresnan did not recover from his surgery in time to take part in the series, but did play in one of the five ODIs that followed the Tests. In this game he took figures of 1–47 and made 4 not out to help England win the match by four wickets. Next England played two Tests in Sri Lanka in March and April. After missing the first match, Bresnan played in the second at the expense of spin bowler Monty Panesar; England won the match to draw the series 1–1, protecting their status in the ICC Test Championship as the best team in the world. He picked up 2–47 in the first innings and then took 1–24 in the second, although he only made 5 runs with the bat.

=== 2012 West Indies and South Africa ===
Bresnan was selected as the first seamer for the opening test against the West Indies, but he suffered disappointment, ending the match with just the one wicket. He was also dismissed for a duck in his only innings, although England went on to win the match. He retained his place in the second test, taking eight wickets in the match and taking 4–37 in the second innings. He also chipped in with a useful 39 not out. With the series won, England made several changes for the final Test, although Bresnan kept his place and opened the bowling. Bresnan took 4–34 in the first ODI, but was less successful in the second match, taking just the one wicket.

England struggled in the test series against South Africa, and suffered a heavy defeat in the first game. all of the England bowlers struggled, with. Bresnan taking 1–140. In the second test Bresnan only managed the single wicket, and came under pressure going into the decider. He was dropped and replaced by Steven Finn, but England went on to lose the match and relinquished their number one ranking. After proving expensive in the second ODI, Bresnan was dropped for the third match in the series. He did not appear gain in the series. He played in the final T20 International, taking 2–14 in two overs, helping England to win the match and level the series.

=== 2012–13 India ===
Bresnan played in the opening match of the test series against India, Alistair Cook's first as captain. He was wicket less as the conditions were not suitable for his style of bowling. He was not involved in the next two matches, as spinners Samit Patel and Monty Panesar were preferred. With England needing just a draw in the final match to win the series, Bresnan was recalled due to his ability with the bat. He helped England seal a historic series win. Bresnan played a big part in the T20 series, his economical bowling helping to keep England competitive. He played well in the ODI series, taking 4–45 in the final match, helping England to win it, although they lost the series 3–2.

=== 2013 New Zealand and ICC Champions Trophy ===
Bresnan was ruled out of England's series in New Zealand due to an injury. There was speculation that the injury would keep him out for some time, but he recovered fairly quickly. He returned for the ICC Champions Trophy, taking 2–45 and making 19 in the opening match against Australia. He was expensive against Sri Lanka but took two wickets in the final group game against New Zealand, helping England to qualify for the semi-finals. He did not play against South Africa in the semi-final but returned for the final. He was unable to influence the game, remaining wicket-less as India won the trophy.

Bresnan did not make an appearance in the Test series against New Zealand. Steven Finn was instead preferred. However, he played in all three ODI's, taking an impressive 2–27 in the final match before the Ashes. In the previous two matches he had not been economical and had struggled to take wickets. However, with the Ashes around the corner, Bresnan was still thought to be in contention, with the third seamer spot being between himself and Steven Finn.

=== 2013 and 2013–14 Australia ===
In the first Ashes Test, Steven Finn was preferred to Bresnan as England took a 1–0 lead in the series. Bresnan was recalled in the second test, taking 2–28 and 2–30 as England went 2–0 up. Bresnan kept his place for the third test. In the fourth test Bresnan took 2–36 as well as making 45. This helped England take a 3–0 lead and win the Ashes. Bresnan suffered an injury ahead of the final test and was unable to play. Bresnan played no part in the limited overs side of the tour, as he was given time to fully recover from his injury ahead of the series in Australia.

England endured a torrid time in Australia. Bresnan did not feature in the opening match, England preferring Chris Tremlett. Bresnan did not appear until the third test, taking 1–81 and 2–53. He could only manage 33 runs in the match as England went 4–0 down. He did not feature in the final match of the series. He took 2–64 in the second ODI and made an unbeaten 41 in the third match. In the fourth match he took 3–45, his best figures of the series, as he helped England win their only game of the tour. He also featured in the T20 series, taking an impressive 1–11 of three overs in the second game. However, England lost the series 3–0.

=== 2014 West Indies and T20 World Cup ===
Bresnan was named in the limited overs squad to tour the West Indies for preparation for the t20 World Cup. He took 3–68 in the first match and made an unbeaten 14 runs, but England lost the match. In the second match he only bowled five overs, taking figures of 1–13. The final match of the series saw him take 3–45 as England won their first match of the ODI series and avoided a whitewash. In the first ODI Bresnan bowled 4 overs for 36 runs. In the second he was very expensive, with 51 runs coming off his bowling, although he did manage to pick up two wickets.

In the T20 World Cup Bresnan scored 17 runs in the defeat against New Zealand. He was expensive in the second match as England beat Sri Lanka, taking figures of 0–48. Against South Africa, Bresnan scored an unbeaten 17 and took his first wicket of the tournament but England lost the match to end their hopes of qualification. He did not take a wicket in the final match against the Netherlands, which England lost to go out of the tournament with just one victory.

== Yorkshire County Cricket Club racism scandal ==
In 2021, Bresnan admitted being involved in the Yorkshire County Cricket Club racism scandal, he apologised for bullying Azeem Rafiq but denied making racist comments towards him. In 2023, the England and Wales Cricket Board began hearing a disciplinary case against Bresnan and other people at the club. The investigation and process was overseen by an independent Cricket Discipline Commission and a specialist leading King's Counsel. In March 2023, he was found guilty of using racist slurs while at the club.
