= List of Australia national cricket coaches =

The following is a list of coaches who have coached the Australia national cricket team in international cricket matches and tournaments.

== List of Australia men's national cricket coaches ==
Prior to 1986, Australia did not select coaches as long-term appointments. Managers were appointed to handle the logistics of overseas tours and the assistant manager often doubled as the coach for the duration of the trip. Sometimes the team captain filled the Australian coaching role, particularly for home matches.

No.	Coach	Years	Achievements/Notes
1	Bob Simpson	1986–96	Won the 1987 World Cup; Regained the Ashes in 1989 and retained in 1990–91, 1993 and 1994–95; Regained the Frank Worrell Trophy in 1994–95; Established Australia as the No. 1 ranked Test team; Resigned after losing the 1996 World Cup
2	Geoff Marsh	1996–99	Won the 1999 World Cup; Retained the Ashes in 1997 and 1998–99; Resigned after losing 1999 Test series in Sri Lanka
3	John Buchanan	1999–2007	Won the 2003 and 2007 World Cups; Retained the Ashes in 2001 and 2002–03; lost in 2005, but regained the Ashes in 2006–07; Won the 2006 Champions Trophy; World-record 16 consecutive Test match wins and 23 ODI wins in World Cups; Retired after winning the 2007 World Cup
4	Tim Nielsen	2007–11	Won the 2009 Champions Trophy; Resigned after the 2011 Test series in Sri Lanka, when he was asked to reapply as coach
5	Mickey Arthur	2011–13	First foreign-born coach; Sacked before the 2013 Ashes series in England
6	Darren Lehmann	2013–18	Won the 2015 World Cup; Regained the Ashes in 2013–14 and 2017–18, lost in 2013 and 2015; Resigned after the 2018 Cape Town ball-tampering scandal
7	Justin Langer	2018–22	Retained the Ashes in 2019 and 2021–22; Won the 2021 T20 World Cup; Resigned after winning the 2021–22 Ashes series, when he was asked to reapply as coach
8	Andrew McDonald	2022–present	Won the 2021–23 World Test Championship; Retained the Ashes in 2023 and 2025–26; Won the 2023 World Cup; Secured the Benaud–Qadir Trophy with a one-nil series win (three Tests played) over Pakistan. First Test series held in Pakistan since the 1998/99 summer.; Guided Australia to its first test match win in India since the 2016/17 winter/summer.
