= Compton–Miller Medal =

Award for the performance in Ashes series

- Competition: The Ashes
- Awarded for: Player of the Series in the Ashes
- Country: Australia; England
- Presented by: Cricket Australia; England and Wales Cricket Board

History
- First award: 2005
- Editions: 11
- First winner: (England) Andrew Flintoff
- Most wins: (Australia) Steve Smith (2)
- Most recent: (Australia) Mitchell Starc (2025–26)

The Compton–Miller Medal is an award for the player of the series in an individual Ashes series of cricket matches between Australia and England.

The award was inaugurated in 2005 and is named for batsman Denis Compton of England and all-rounder Keith Miller of Australia. According to David Collier, chief executive of the England and Wales Cricket Board (ECB), "Denis Compton had the post-war status of a matinee idol – with a love of life and a love of living life to the full. It was an attitude he shared with Keith Miller and they became not only great rivals but also great friends."

The new medal was announced just before the first Test in 2005 Ashes series, with Miller's widow Marie Challman, and Compton's son Richard representing the two men honoured in the award's title. The two captains for the series, Michael Vaughan and Ricky Ponting, were also present.

== Recipients ==
Series	Player	Notes
2005	(England) Andrew Flintoff	All-rounder for England (made 402 runs, including one century, at an average of 40.20 and took 24 wickets at an average of 27.29, including one five-wicket haul; was awarded two player of the match awards).
2006–07	(Australia) Ricky Ponting	Top order batsman and captain for Australia (made 576 runs, including two centuries, at an average of 82.28 and was awarded two player of the match awards).
2009	(England) Andrew Strauss	Opening batsman and captain for England (made 474 runs, including one century, at an average of 52.66).
2010–11	(England) Alastair Cook	Opening batsman for England (made 766 runs, including two centuries and one double century, at an average of 127.66 and was awarded two player of the match awards).
2013	(England) Ian Bell	Middle order batsman for England (made 562 runs, including three centuries, at an average of 62.44).
2013–14	(Australia) Mitchell Johnson	Fast bowler for Australia (37 wickets at an average of 13.97 and was awarded three player of the match awards).
2015	(England) Joe Root	Middle order batsman for England (made 460 runs, including two centuries, at an average of 57.50 and was awarded one player of the match award).
2017–18	(Australia) Steve Smith	Top order batsman and captain for Australia (made 687 runs, including two centuries and one double century, at an average of 137.40 and was awarded two player of the match awards).
2019	(Australia) Steve Smith	Top order batsman for Australia (made 774 runs, including two centuries and one double century, at an average of 110.57 and was awarded two player of the match awards). Only player to have received the award twice.
2021–22	(Australia) Travis Head	Middle order batsman for Australia (made 357 runs, including two centuries, at an average of 59.50 and was awarded two player of the match awards).
2023	(England) Chris Woakes	All-rounder for England (made 79 runs at an average of 19.75 and took 19 wickets at an average of 18.14, including one five-wicket haul; was awarded one player of the match award.)
2025–26	(Australia) Mitchell Starc	Fast bowler for Australia (took 31 wickets at an average of 19.93, including two seven-wicket hauls; also scored 156 runs, including two fifties and was awarded two player of the match awards).
