= 2013–14 Ashes series =

- Part of English cricket team in Australia in 2013–14
- The Commonwealth Bank Ashes Series 2013–14 logo
- Date: 21 November 2013 – 7 January 2014
- Location: Australia
- Result: Australia won the five-Test series 5–0
- Player of the series: Compton–Miller Medal: Mitchell Johnson (Aus)
Teams
- Australia: England
Captains
- Michael Clarke: Alastair Cook
Most runs
- David Warner (523) Brad Haddin (493) Chris Rogers (463): Kevin Pietersen (294); Michael Carberry (281); Ben Stokes (279)
Most wickets
- Mitchell Johnson (37) Ryan Harris (22) Nathan Lyon (19): Stuart Broad (21); Ben Stokes (15); James Anderson (14)

The 2013–14 Ashes (named Commonwealth Bank Ashes Series for sponsorship reasons) was a five-match Test cricket series between England and Australia. The five venues for the series were the Brisbane Cricket Ground, the Adelaide Oval, the WACA Ground, the Melbourne Cricket Ground and the Sydney Cricket Ground.

Australia won the series 5–0 and regained the Ashes for the first time since 2006–07. In doing so, Australia recorded only the third 5–0 Ashes whitewash in history. With 37 wickets at an average of 13.97, and three man of the match awards, Mitchell Johnson was player of the series, with the series characterised as a comeback series for Johnson who had been dropped from the Australia's squad for the 2013 Ashes series in England, the first of the two back-to-back Ashes series that year. Australia had lost that series 3–0, their third consecutive Ashes series defeat.

The series was notable for aggressive and hostile fast bowling display by Johnson throughout the series which many analysts described similar to the days of Lillee and Thomson. Johnson's performance was hailed by some in the British media as one of the greatest ever in cricket history and arguably the best of the modern era.

Beginning with this series, the four-year cycle of Ashes series in Australia was brought forward one year. This meant this series was held three years after the previous 2010–11 series in Australia and only three months after the end of the 2013 Ashes in England. The schedule for series in England was brought forward by two years, beginning in 2015, which swapped where each series is to be played in subsequent years. This rescheduling was to avoid clashes between Ashes series in Australia and the Cricket World Cup, both previously held very close together in their four-year cycles.

== Squads ==
On 23 September 2013, England announced a 17-man touring party for the Ashes series. Former Ireland international bowler Boyd Rankin, New Zealand-born all-rounder Ben Stokes and Zimbabwe-born batsman Gary Ballance all received call-ups despite being uncapped for England in Tests, while opening batsman Michael Carberry, spin bowler Monty Panesar and seamer Chris Tremlett were also included. Among those who missed out were opening batsman Nick Compton, spin bowler James Tredwell and seamers Graham Onions, who helped Durham win the championship, and Tim Bresnan, although Bresnan was suffering from a back injury and still travelled with the squad to Australia. Matt Prior was the only specialist wicket-keeper in the side; Jonny Bairstow was designated to deputise for him.

On 12 November 2013, Australia announced a 12-man squad for the first Test, including ODI stand-in captain George Bailey, who at that point was still yet to make his Test debut. Also included was Mitchell Johnson, who, according to Australian captain Michael Clarke and coach Darren Lehmann, Johnson was recalled to the 12-member squad "partly on the faith that he can demonstrate greater control across the series;" with Clarke backing Johnson's inclusion in the squad by remarking, "I said a couple of days ago if Mitch was selected in this squad, it wouldn't surprise me if in a couple of months' time you see Mitch being Man of the Series."

On 25 November 2013, Jonathan Trott pulled out of the remainder of the tour citing a stress-related illness.

On 21 December 2013, Graeme Swann retired from international cricket with immediate effect. Two days later, it was announced that leg-spinner Scott Borthwick and off-spinner James Tredwell had been called up following Swann's retirement.

Australia	England
Michael Clarke (c); Brad Haddin (vc, wk); George Bailey; Doug Bollinger^{†}; James Faulkner; Ryan Harris; Mitchell Johnson; Nathan Lyon; Nathan Coulter-Nile^{†}; Chris Rogers; Peter Siddle; Steve Smith; David Warner; Shane Watson; Alex Doolan^{†}	Alastair Cook (c); Kevin Pietersen (vc); James Anderson; Jonny Bairstow (wk); Gary Ballance; Ian Bell; Tim Bresnan; Stuart Broad; Michael Carberry; Steven Finn; Monty Panesar; Matt Prior (wk); Boyd Rankin; Joe Root; Graeme Swann; Ben Stokes; Chris Tremlett; Jonathan Trott; Scott Borthwick^{†}; James Tredwell^{†}

^{†} Late addition

Australia played the same eleven in every test: Warner, Rogers, Watson, Clarke, Smith, Bailey, Haddin, Johnson, Siddle, Harris and Lyon.

== Matches ==
=== First Test ===
21–24 November
Scorecard

Australia	v	England
295 (97.1 overs); Brad Haddin 94 (153); Stuart Broad 6/81 (24 overs)		136 (52.4 overs); Michael Carberry 40 (113); Mitchell Johnson 4/61 (17 overs)
7/401d (94 overs); David Warner 124 (154); Chris Tremlett 3/69 (17 overs)		179 (81.1 overs); Alastair Cook 65 (195); Mitchell Johnson 5/42 (21.1 overs)

Australia won by 381 runs
The Gabba, Brisbane
Umpires: Aleem Dar (Pak) and Kumar Dharmasena (SL)
Player of the match: Mitchell Johnson (Aus)

- Australia won the toss and elected to bat.
- George Bailey (Aus) made his Test debut.
- Kevin Pietersen (Eng) made his 100th Test appearance and Brad Haddin (Aus) made his 50th Test appearance.

Australia won the toss and elected to bat, however they were reduced to 6/132 just after lunch on the first day, with Stuart Broad claiming four early wickets. From there, Brad Haddin and Mitchell Johnson added 114 for the seventh wicket before Johnson was dismissed for 64. At stumps on day one, Australia was 8/273, with Haddin on 78.

When play resumed on day two, England took the remaining two Australian wickets quickly to dismiss them for 295. Haddin was run out for 94, while Broad claimed 6/81. In reply, England lost Cook and Trott in the opening session to go to lunch at 2/55. Momentum swung Australia's way when Harris dismissed Pietersen shortly afterwards, sparking a dramatic collapse which saw the visitors crumble to 8/91, with Mitchell Johnson the main architect of the collapse, taking 4/61. Eventually England was bowled out for 136, a deficit of 159. In their second innings, Australia reached 0/65 by the close of play.

Australia increased their advantage on day three, led by David Warner (124) and Michael Clarke (113). Brad Haddin also contributed 53, and Johnson contributed with the bat in the second innings as well and scored an unbeaten 45-ball 39, as Australia declared on 7/401, setting England a target of 561 for victory. In response, England lost Carberry and Trott before the end of the day, finishing on 2/24, with Johnson continuing to trouble and unbalance Trott with short-pitched bowling, and ended up dismissed on 9 when Johnson had him flicking one straight into the hands of Nathan Lyon.

Australia made steady inroads on day four, although at tea England had steadied somewhat at 4/142. However, Lyon dismissed Cook for 65 straight after the resumption, initiating another collapse, with Johnson taking three of the remaining four wickets, and saw the tourists bowled out for 179. A substitute fielder Chris Sabburg, who entered the field for a brief moment, took a widely reported catch that dismissed Kevin Pietersen for 26. Australia won by 381 runs and Mitchell Johnson was named man of the match, claiming 5/42 in the second innings and nine wickets for the match, as well as his all-round efforts towards the runs. Towards the end of England's second innings, the Australians had set an attacking field for Johnson, about which ESPNcricinfo wrote in their report, "Every fielder was there for the kill: four slips, a fly slip, two leg slips, silly mid off, short leg."

=== Second Test ===
5–9 December
Scorecard

Australia	v	England
9/570d (158 overs); Michael Clarke 148 (243); Stuart Broad 3/98 (30 overs)		172 (68.2 overs); Ian Bell 72* (106); Mitchell Johnson 7/40 (17.2 overs)
3/132d (39 overs); David Warner 83* (117); James Anderson 2/19 (7 overs)		312 (101.4 overs); Joe Root 87 (194); Peter Siddle 4/57 (19 overs)

Australia won by 218 runs
Adelaide Oval, Adelaide
Umpires: Kumar Dharmasena (SL) and Marais Erasmus (SA)
Player of the match: Mitchell Johnson (Aus)

- Australia won the toss and elected to bat.
- Rain on Day 1 meant only 14.2 overs were possible before lunch; the lost overs were recovered before the end of the day.
- Ben Stokes (Eng) made his Test debut.

Australia fielded an unchanged line-up from the first Test, while England brought in Stokes (on debut) and Panesar for Trott and Tremlett. Australia once again won the toss and batted first. They started well, reaching 1/155, but England removed Watson (51) and Rogers (72) in quick succession. Bailey scored an enterprising 53 before being caught off a pull shot. As in the first Test, Australia scored 273 runs on the first day, this time for the loss of five wickets, with Clarke on 48 and Haddin on 7 – both having survived dropped catches in the day.

Clarke and Haddin would go on to add exactly 200 for the sixth wicket, scoring 148 and 118 respectively. Harris scored an unbeaten 55 as Australia declared on 9/570. Johnson claimed the wicket of Cook before stumps on day two as the visitors were left at 1/35.

Australia removed Root and Pietersen to rash strokes on the third morning to see the score 3/66. Carberry and Bell added 45 before Warner removed the former for 60 with a one-handed catch at square leg off the bowling of Watson. This sparked a dramatic collapse for England, with Johnson claiming three wickets in one over shortly after lunch to reduce England to 7/117. Johnson then also claimed the final three wickets to claim figures of 7/40 and bowl out the tourists for 172, a 398-run deficit. Bell was left unbeaten on 72 and Australia decided not to enforce the follow-on. The hosts stumbled in their second innings to 2/4, but recovered to 3/132 at stumps, with Warner not out on 83.

The threat of rain on days four and five prompted Clarke to declare on the overnight score, setting a target of 531 for victory. Cook and Carberry both fell to hook shots in the first session, and England reached lunch at 2/65. Pietersen reached his first half-century of the series but was dismissed shortly afterwards for 53. Bell was out to Smith just before tea and the visitors were still struggling at 4/143. Root made 87 before falling to Lyon and at the close, England had progressed to 6/247.

Broad fell in the first over of day five after a short rain delay, and Prior made 69 before being caught in the deep. From there, Australia quickly wrapped up the innings for 312, resulting in a 218-run victory and a 2–0 series lead. Johnson was once again named man of the match; he had taken 17 wickets at an average of 12 across the two test matches played at that point.

=== Third Test ===
13–17 December
Scorecard

Australia	v	England
385 (103.3 overs); Steve Smith 111 (208); Stuart Broad 3/100 (22 overs)		251 (88 overs); Alastair Cook 72 (153); Peter Siddle 3/36 (16 overs)
6/369d (87 overs); David Warner 112 (140); Tim Bresnan 2/53 (14 overs)		353 (103.2 overs); Ben Stokes 120 (195); Mitchell Johnson 4/78 (25.2 overs)

Australia won by 150 runs
WACA Ground, Perth
Umpires: Billy Bowden (NZ) and Marais Erasmus (SA)
Player of the match: Steve Smith (Aus)

- Australia won the toss and elected to bat.
- Both Alastair Cook (Eng) and Michael Clarke (Aus) played in their 100th Test.
- Ben Stokes (Eng) scored his maiden Test century.
- Australia regained the Ashes.

England replaced Panesar with Bresnan, while Australia again named an unchanged line-up. For the third time in the series, Australia won the toss and batted. Warner made 60 but the hosts quickly stumbled to 5/143. Smith and Haddin rebuilt with a 124-run partnership, which ended when Haddin was caught for 55. Smith reached his hundred and Australia reached the end of the day without further loss at 6/326, with Smith on 103 and Johnson on 39.

England removed Johnson early on the second morning without adding to his overnight score, and shortly afterwards Smith was dismissed for 111. The tourists quickly wrapped up the innings for 385. In response, the England openers added 85 before Carberry was bowled by Harris for 43. Root was dismissed caught behind shortly afterwards. Cook reached 72 before miscuing a cut shot off Lyon, while Pietersen fell to an athletic catch by Johnson at mid-on. At the close, England were 4/180.

Australia efficiently wrapped up the innings on the third morning, dismissing England for 251, a 134-run lead. Warner and Rogers added 157 for the opening partnership before Rogers was caught for 54. Warner reached his century before holing out at long-on for 112, and at the end of play, Australia were 3/235, a lead of 369.

Watson scored 74 runs from just 42 balls on the fourth morning before he was comically run out for 103. Bailey hit 28 off one over from Anderson – the equal record in Test cricket for most runs in one over – following which Clarke declared with the total on 6/369, setting England 504 to win. Harris bowled Cook with the first ball of the innings, but Carberry and Root were able to steady with a 62-run partnership. Both were out in quick succession, and when Pietersen fell for 45, the score was 4/121. However, Bell and Stokes added 99 before Bell was caught behind on DRS review for 60. England reached 5/251 by the close, requiring 252 runs to keep the Ashes alive.

Stokes and Prior frustrated Australia for an hour and a half on the fifth day before Prior was dismissed for 26. Shortly afterwards, Stokes reached his maiden Test century, and the tourists went into lunch at 6/332. However, he was caught by Haddin off the bowling of Lyon for 120 straight after the resumption, and Australia was able to wrap up the innings for 353. Australia won by 150 runs, securing a 3–0 series lead, and with it, their first Ashes series win since 2006–07. Smith was man of the match for his hundred in the first innings.

=== Fourth Test ===
26–29 December
Scorecard

England	v	Australia
255 (100 overs); Kevin Pietersen 71 (161); Mitchell Johnson 5/63 (24 overs)		204 (82.2 overs); Brad Haddin 65 (68); James Anderson 4/67 (20.2 overs)
179 (61 overs); Alastair Cook 51 (91); Nathan Lyon 5/50 (17 overs)		2/231 (51.5 overs); Chris Rogers 116 (155); Monty Panesar 1/43 (7.5 overs)

Australia won by 8 wickets
Melbourne Cricket Ground, Melbourne
Umpires: Aleem Dar (Pak) and Kumar Dharmasena (SL)
Player of the match: Mitchell Johnson (Aus)

- Australia won the toss and elected to field.
- Monty Panesar (Eng), Shane Watson and Peter Siddle (both Aus) all made their 50th Test appearances.
- 91,092 people attended the first day of the match, a new world record attendance for a Test match.

Australia's team was unchanged once again, while the sudden retirement of Swann prompted England to select Panesar. Prior was also dropped for Bairstow. Michael Clarke won the toss for the fourth time in the series and elected to bowl. Cook and Carberry started well and added 48 for the opening stand before the former edged Siddle for 27. England's scoring rate was slow and their top order all made starts – Carberry scored 38, Bell made 27 and Root 24, but only Pietersen went on to score a half century. Johnson removed Stokes and Bairstow in quick succession at the end of the day to shift the advantage back to Australia, with the score 6/226 and Pietersen on 67.

Australia dismissed the English tail with little resistance, bowling out the visitors for 255. Pietersen added only one boundary to his overnight score and top-scored with 71. Johnson claimed his third five-wicket haul of the series, taking 5/63. In reply, Australia struggled, stumbling to 5/112. Rogers made 61 but holed out to mid-off and the hosts were in trouble at the end of the day at 9/164. Haddin remained unbeaten on 43 and Anderson and Broad both captured three wickets.

Haddin and Lyon added 40 for the last wicket on the third morning, with the former top-scoring with 65. Australia were dismissed for 204, a deficit of 51 runs. By lunch, England had moved to 0/54 in response, an imposing lead of 105. Johnson trapped Cook in front for 51 and England then collapsed, losing 3/1. Siddle removed Carberry lbw, Johnson ran out Root and Lyon dismissed Bell first ball to see the visitors stumble to 4/87. Stokes and Pietersen added 44 before Stokes holed out to long-off, and Bairstow and Pietersen also added 42 to see the score at 5/173. However, Australia took the last five wickets for just six runs, bowling out England for just 179 and setting 231 for victory. Lyon was the main architect, taking 5/50. By the close of play, Warner and Rogers took the score to 30 without loss.

Australia resumed on the fourth morning needing a further 201 to win, while England needed 10 wickets. Both openers were dropped in the first hour, but Warner was caught behind off Stokes for 25. Rogers and Watson reached lunch with the score 1/143, needing 88 to win. Rogers brought up his century, scoring 116 before he was caught behind off Panesar. Watson also made 83 not out as Australia cantered home to win by eight wickets. Johnson claimed his third man of the match award of the series for his eight wickets.

=== Fifth Test ===
3–5 January
Scorecard

Australia	v	England
326 (76 overs); Steve Smith 115 (154); Ben Stokes 6/99 (19.5 overs)		155 (58.5 overs); Ben Stokes 47 (101); Peter Siddle 3/23 (13 overs)
276 (61.3 overs); Chris Rogers 119 (169); Scott Borthwick 3/33 (6 overs)		166 (31.4 overs); Michael Carberry 43 (63); Ryan Harris 5/25 (9.4 overs)

Australia won by 281 runs
Sydney Cricket Ground, Sydney
Umpires: Aleem Dar (Pak) and Marais Erasmus (SA)
Player of the match: Ryan Harris (Aus)

- England won the toss and elected to field.
- Gary Ballance, Scott Borthwick and Boyd Rankin (all Eng) made their Test debuts.
- Ben Stokes (Eng) took his maiden Test five-wicket haul.

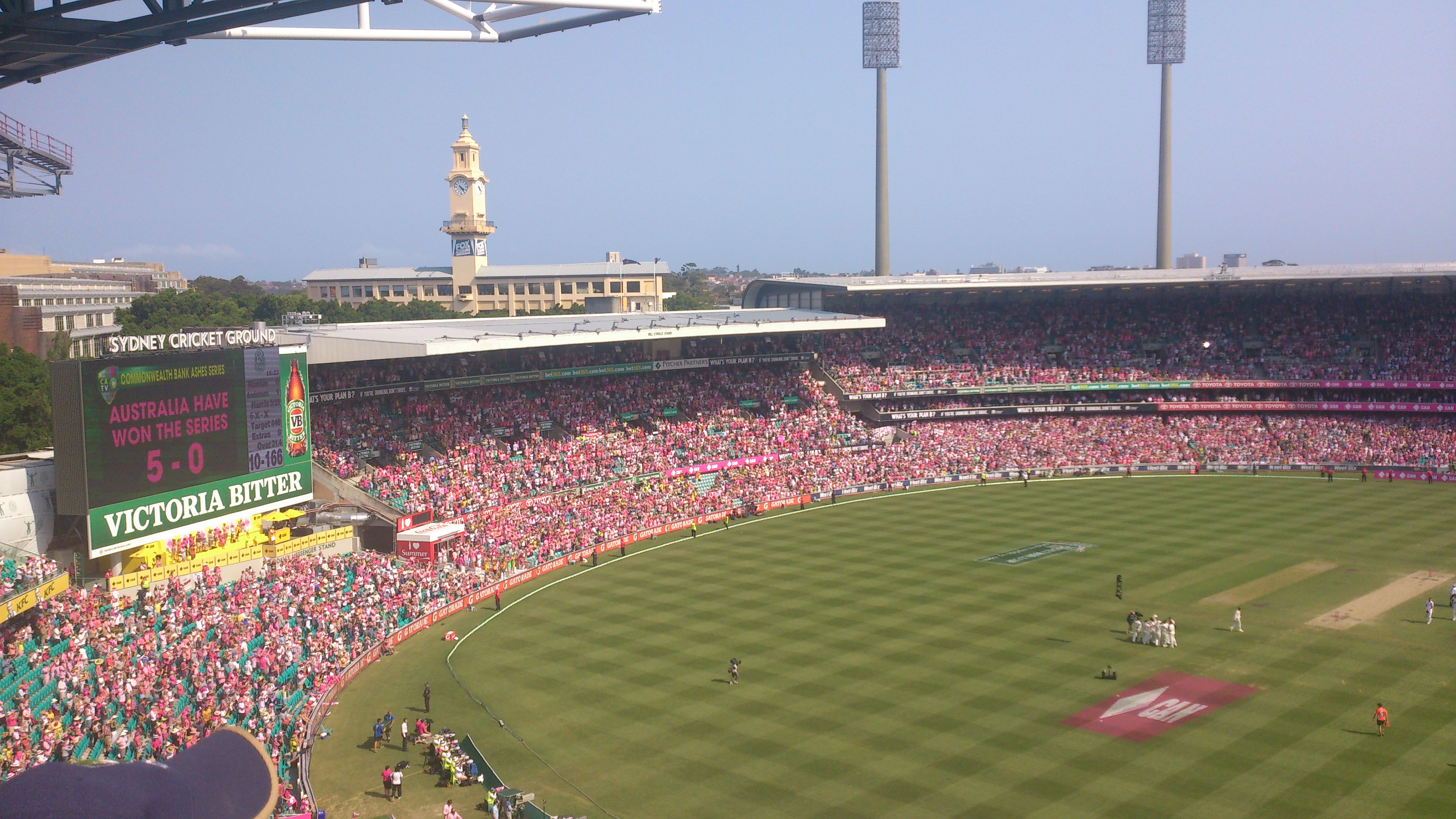
Celebrations at the SCG after Australia won the Ashes 5–0

Australia named the same team as the previous four Tests, while for England, Ballance, Borthwick and Rankin made their debuts in place of Root, Bresnan and Panesar. Cook won his first toss of the series and elected to bowl first. Australia were quickly reduced to 5/97 before Haddin and Smith added 128 for the sixth wicket; Haddin scored 75 before falling to a catch at slip, and Smith went on to make 115 before being the last man dismissed as Australia were bowled out for 326. Stokes was the best of the English bowlers, claiming six wickets. In reply, England lost Carberry for a duck before the close of play and went to stumps on day one at 1/8.

On day two, another batting collapse saw England lose four wickets for 15 runs, collapsing to 5/23. Stokes scored 47, but further predation by the Australian bowlers had the English all out for 155 at the tea break. Australia then took a 171-run lead into their second innings. In response, Rogers started well for Australia, reaching 73 not out by the end of the second day. The home side reached stumps at 4/140.

Rogers went on to score 119 on the third day, with Bailey also contributing 46. Australia were bowled out for 276, setting England 448 to win. The visitors lasted only 31.4 overs, crumbling for 166; Carberry top-scored with 43, while Harris claimed 5/25. Australia won by 281 runs and secured a series clean sweep, winning the Ashes 5–0. Harris was named man of the match for his eight wickets, while Johnson was man of the series, claiming 37 wickets across the five Tests.

== Statistics ==
=== Batting ===
Most runs

Player	Matches	Runs	Average	Highest
David Warner	5	523	58.11	124
Brad Haddin	5	493	61.62	118
Chris Rogers	5	463	46.30	119
Michael Clarke	5	363	40.33	148
Shane Watson	5	345	38.33	103

=== Bowling ===
Most wickets

Player	Matches	Wickets	Runs	Average	BBI
Mitchell Johnson	5	37	517	13.97	7/40
Ryan Harris	5	22	425	19.31	5/25
Stuart Broad	5	21	578	27.52	6/81
Nathan Lyon	5	19	558	29.36	5/50
Peter Siddle	5	16	386	24.12	4/57

== Broadcasting ==
Country	TV broadcaster(s)	Radio broadcaster(s)
Australia	Nine Network	ABC Radio Grandstand
Bangladesh	STAR Sports 1	
India	STAR Sports 1	
Pakistan	PTV Sports	
South Africa; Zimbabwe	SuperSport	
United Kingdom; Ireland	Sky Sports	BBC Radio 4 BBC Radio 5 Live Sports Extra
New Zealand	Sky Sport	
