= 2005 Ashes series =

- Part of the Australian cricket team in England in 2005
- Ashes 2005 series logo
- Date: 21 July 2005 – 12 September 2005
- Location: England
- Result: England won the five-Test series 2–1
- Player of the series: Andrew Flintoff (Eng) and Shane Warne (Aus); Compton–Miller Medal: Andrew Flintoff (Eng)
Teams
- England: Australia
Captains
- Michael Vaughan: Ricky Ponting
Most runs
- Kevin Pietersen (473); Marcus Trescothick (431); Andrew Flintoff (402): Justin Langer (394); Ricky Ponting (359); Michael Clarke (335)
Most wickets
- Andrew Flintoff (24); Simon Jones (18); Steve Harmison (17): Shane Warne (40); Brett Lee (20); Glenn McGrath (19)

The 2005 Ashes series was that year's edition of the long-standing cricket rivalry between England and Australia. Starting on 21 July 2005, England and Australia played five Tests, with the Ashes held by Australia as the most recent victors. The final result was a 2–1 series win for England, who succeeded (for the first time since 1986–87) in their biennial attempt to win the urn.

In March 2005, Australia captain Ricky Ponting said this Ashes series would be the closest since Australia's dominance began in 1989. Since 1989, when Australia started their winning Ashes streak, England had lost by more than one match in all but one of the series played, that of 1997. During that period, Australia were the pre-eminent team in the world, while England had dropped from being the top-rated in 1981 to sixth for much of the 1990s, reaching a low point in 1999 with a series loss to New Zealand leaving them bottom of the unofficial Wisden Cricketers' Almanack rankings. However, since the previous series in 2002–03, England had improved on their fifth place in the official rankings, and were second before this series. Australia were still top-ranked, but England had won 14 and drawn three of their 18 previous Test matches since March 2004, and had won six successive series. Nonetheless, before the First Test some Australians, including fast bowler Glenn McGrath, were suggesting that a 5–0 win in the series for Australia was a serious possibility.

On the day after the series it was "hailed as the most thrilling series ever". Three matches in particular were very closely fought, with one match decided by a two-run margin, one match drawn with only one wicket remaining, and one match won by three wickets. The outcome of the contest was not decided until the last day of the series.

Australia won the first Test comfortably, but in the second Test at Edgbaston, considered to be one of the greatest of all time, England levelled the series with a two-run victory, the narrowest win in Ashes history. The third Test ended in a draw (with England one wicket away from a win), and England won the fourth Test in Nottingham (Trent Bridge) by three wickets, losing seven men in a chase of 129, after England enforced the follow-on after gaining a lead of 259 on first innings.

The fifth and final Test started on 8 September, at the Oval in London. It entered its final day with England batting in their second innings, 40 runs ahead with nine wickets in hand. Australia needed a win to force a 2–2 series draw and retain the Ashes; any other result would give the Ashes to England and end 16 years and eight series of Australian dominance. After a day of fluctuating fortunes, England established a lead of 341 after Kevin Pietersen's maiden century of 158 runs, and Australia batted for one over before the teams went off for bad light, and the match was declared a draw, ensuring the return of the Ashes to England.

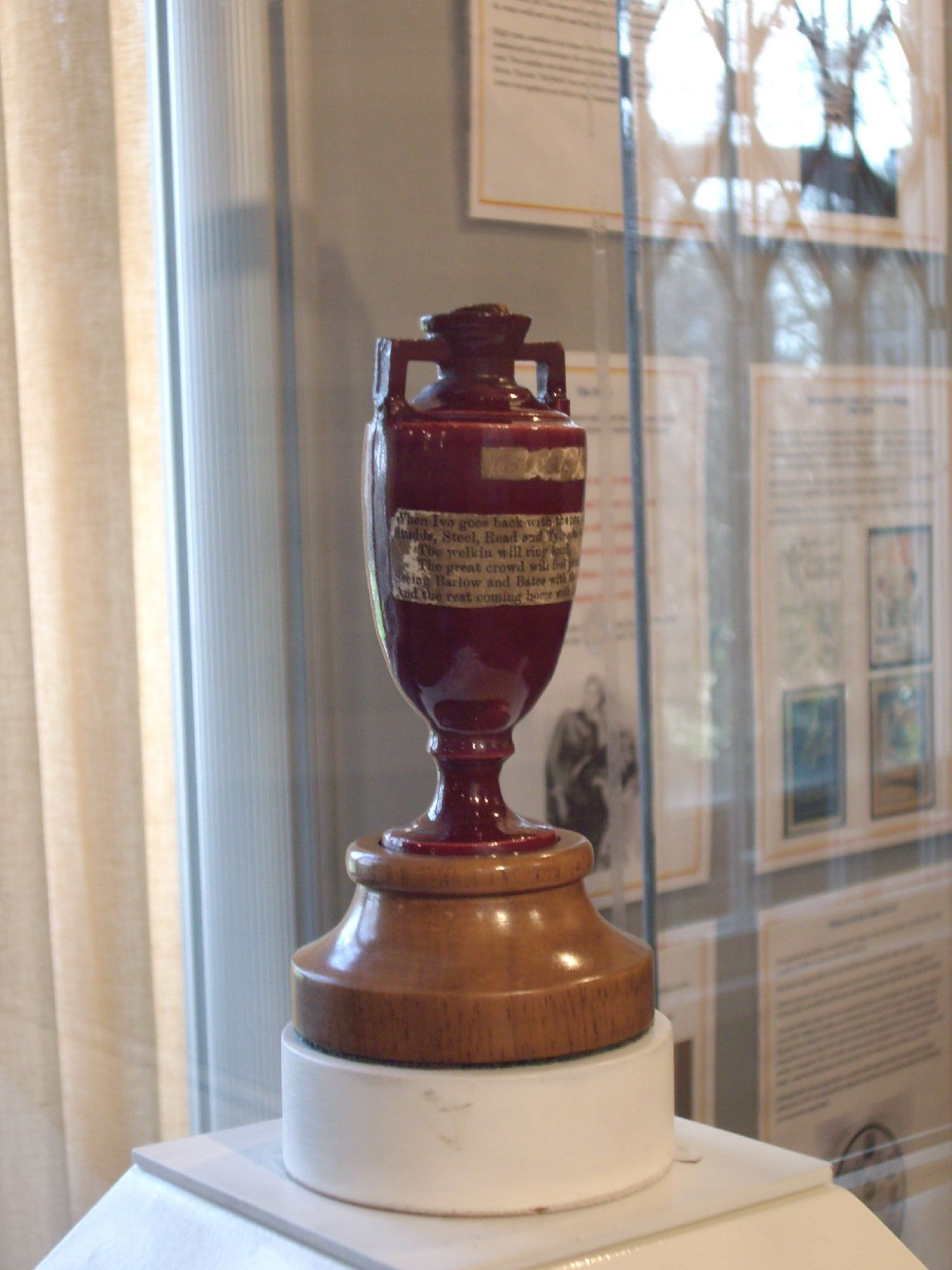
The Ashes urn

== Squads ==
England	Australia
Michael Vaughan (c); Andrew Flintoff (vc); James Anderson^{b}; Ian Bell; Paul Collingwood^{a, b}; Ashley Giles; Steve Harmison; Matthew Hoggard; Geraint Jones (wk); Simon Jones; Kevin Pietersen; Andrew Strauss; ~~Chris Tremlett~~^{b}; Marcus Trescothick	Ricky Ponting (c); Adam Gilchrist (vc, wk); Stuart Clark^{c}; Michael Clarke; Jason Gillespie; Brad Haddin (wk); Matthew Hayden; Brad Hodge; Justin Langer; Michael Kasprowicz; Simon Katich; Brett Lee; Stuart MacGill; Damien Martyn; Glenn McGrath; Shaun Tait; Shane Warne

^{a} Collingwood was added on 1 August for the second Test, but sent back to his county on 3 August.

^{b} An injury to Simon Jones saw Anderson come into the squad for the fifth Test, while Tremlett was dropped because he was "not on top of his game" according to England's chairman of selectors David Graveney. Collingwood was also called up again.

^{c} Clark was called up as cover for pace bowlers McGrath and Lee before the third Test.

== Match details ==
=== First Test ===
21–25 July
Scorecard

Australia	v	England
190 (40.2 overs); Justin Langer 40 (44); Steve Harmison 5/43 (11.2 overs)		155 (48.1 overs); Kevin Pietersen 57 (89); Glenn McGrath 5/53 (18 overs)
384 (100.4 overs); Michael Clarke 91 (106); Steve Harmison 3/54 (27.4 overs)		180 (58.1 overs); Kevin Pietersen 64* (79); Glenn McGrath 4/29 (17.1 overs)

Australia won by 239 runs
Lord's, London
Umpires: Aleem Dar (Pak) and Rudi Koertzen (SA)
Player of the match: Glenn McGrath (Aus)

- Australia won the toss and elected to bat.
- Rain on day 4 prevented play until 15:45.
- Kevin Pietersen (Eng) made his Test debut.

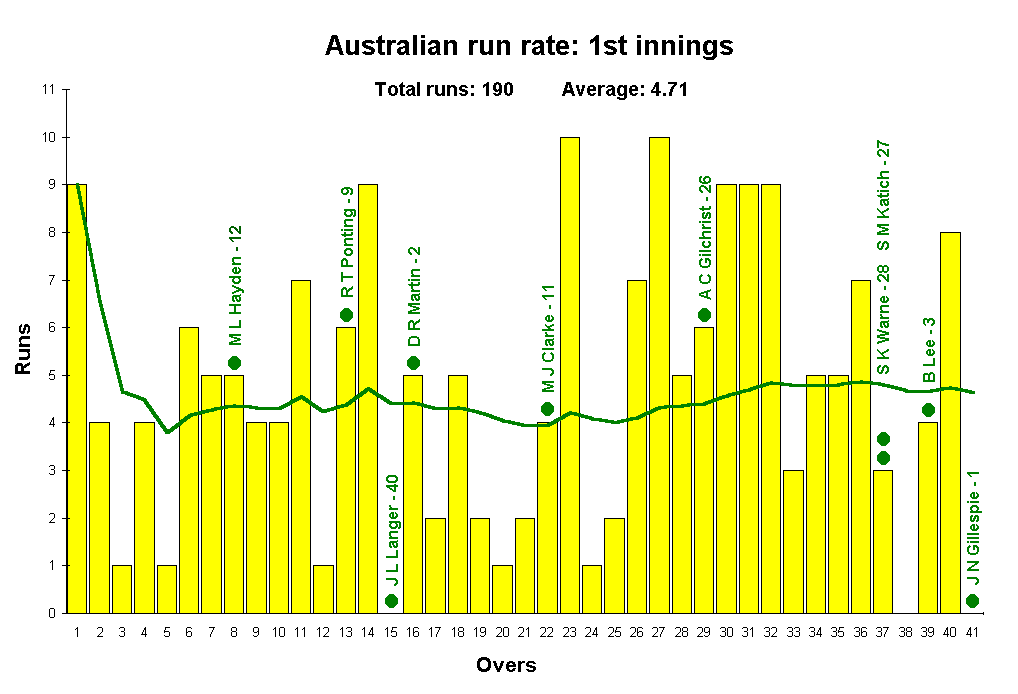
Australian run rate from the first innings

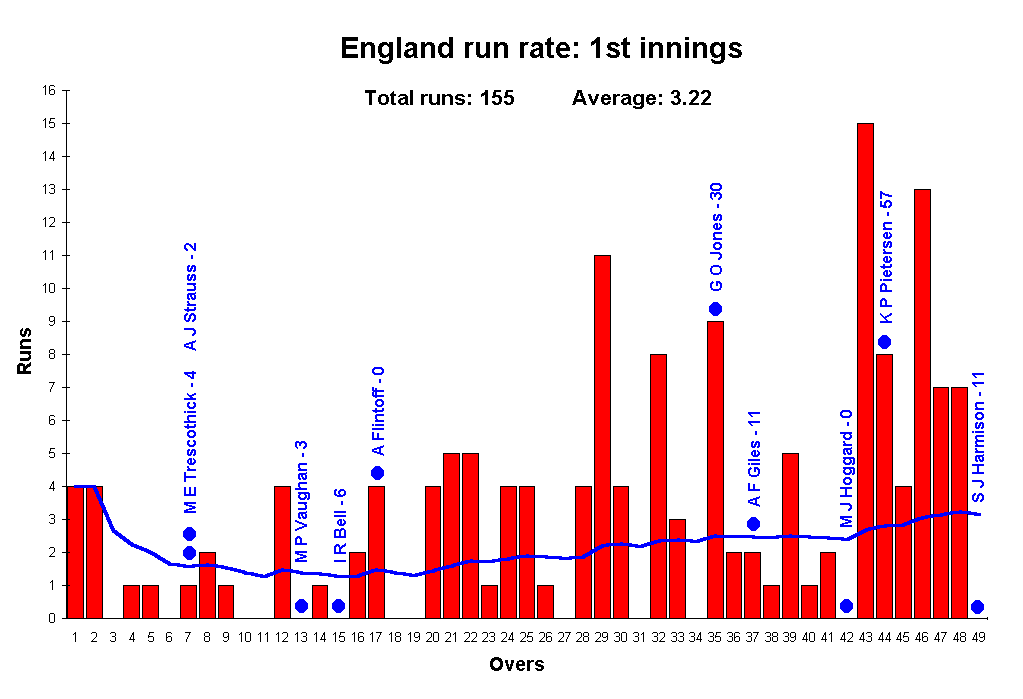
English run rate from their first innings

The first day of cricket at Lord's saw 17 of the total of 40 wickets fall, and though Australia lost 10 of them, the BBC saw it as "advantage Australia". Ricky Ponting won the toss and chose to bat, and Steve Harmison shook up the opening batters early on, hitting the Australians with bouncers; the second ball of the match hit Justin Langer on the elbow but he went on to make 40 and top score for Australia. The pitch offered bounce and swing from the start, while Matthew Hoggard got a ball on line to swing between Matthew Hayden's bat and pad and into his off stump. Hayden was gone for 12, having, according to the BBC report, "played nervously from the word go". Australia still scored at a rate above 4.5 runs per over in the mini-session before drinks, which was taken when Harmison cut Ponting on the right cheek, and in his next over Harmison got his first wicket of the series as Ponting edged him to Andrew Strauss at third slip for 9. Langer was next to depart, having scored at above five an over when he top-edged a pull shot to Harmison at square-leg for 40 off the bowling of Andrew Flintoff, whose first over in Ashes cricket was a wicket maiden. In the next over, Simon Jones was brought on, he got an immediate reward, with Damien Martyn caught behind for 2, and in the penultimate over before lunch Michael Clarke was leg before wicket (lbw) to Jones, leaving Australia five down after the first session of play.

Adam Gilchrist, Simon Katich and Shane Warne all played a part in getting Australia past 100, forging innings in the 20s, but Flintoff had Gilchrist for 26 before Warne and Katich added 49 for the seventh wicket. Harmison, coming back for a second spell, was wicketless in his first two overs but after drinks he took four wickets for seven runs in 2.2 overs as Australia were all out for 190. He finished with five wickets for 43 runs. Glenn McGrath was the not out batter, ending with 10 runs, and he also opened the bowling with Brett Lee. England batted for six overs until tea without losing a wicket, scoring 10 runs, but McGrath, who bowled his usual accurate line and length, reaped the rewards after tea. Marcus Trescothick fell first ball after tea, edging to slip to become McGrath's 500th victim in Test cricket, and Strauss fell in similar fashion three balls later. Michael Vaughan and Ian Bell survived six overs, adding seven runs before McGrath had them bowled in the 13th and 15th over respectively. With Flintoff bowled by McGrath in the 17th, and England had lost five wickets for 21 runs, with five of their top six batters out in single figures. However, Kevin Pietersen and Geraint Jones batted together to make England's highest partnership of the innings, adding 58 and, according to the BBC report, "treating Jason Gillespie with some disdain". A short ball from Lee was too much for Geraint Jones, though, and he fended it to wicket-keeper Gilchrist, out for 30. Ashley Giles hit two quick boundaries to bat out the over, but the last ball of Lee's next over was glanced to the keeper, and Giles was out for 11, and England were 92/7 overnight – needing 98 for the last three wickets to get level with Australia.

England cut the deficit on the second morning, but were still bowled out before they could build a first-innings lead. Hoggard departed for a 16-ball duck, cutting a delivery from Warne to Hayden in the slips. Pietersen now started to attack, taking 21 runs off seven deliveries before he was out caught by Martyn, a diving catch just inside the boundary, and England were nine down for 122, still trailing by 68. The English 10th wicket pairing of Simon Jones and Harmison added 33 after that, a stand that was the fifth-highest of the game thus far and which reduced Australia's lead to 35 runs. In the field, England started by having Langer run out for 6 in the fifth over, but Hayden and Ponting rebuilt to bat until lunch unbeaten.

Though Hayden was bowled by Flintoff for 34 three overs after lunch, the batters from three to six all passed 40; it was to be the only time in the series that Australia accomplished this feat. Clarke needed an extra life to do it, but made England pay after Pietersen dropped him on 21, and thus the partnership was allowed to last for 34.3 overs, with 155 runs being scored. Flintoff was smashed to all corners, with 84 runs being scored off him in his 19 second-day overs, but in the last 10 overs England came back to take wickets. Started by an inside-edge from Clarke off Hoggard, which left Australia's 24-year-old batter bowled for 91, and Australia lost a further three wickets for 24 runs before the end of the day. The Australian lead was still 314, twice England's first innings total and then some, and Katich was still batting, not out on 10.

Four overs into the morning, specialist spin bowler Giles was involved in a dismissal for the only time in the match, having Lee run out for 8. However, Gillespie batted for an hour and 15 minutes, and took part in a 52-run stand with the recognised batter, Katich before Simon Jones got his reward with an away-swinger that crashed into Gillespie's off stump, after having three catches dropped. The last-wicket partnership rubbed it in with 43 more runs before Katich was caught by Simon Jones off Harmison, but England were set what would be a world record 420 to win.

They started positively, riding some favourable umpiring decisions; Aleem Dar turned down four strong lbw appeals off Warne. Strauss and Trescothick could thus add 80 for the first wicket before Strauss edged a short ball from Lee back into the bowler's waiting hands. Vaughan got off the mark with a four with his second ball, before facing 24 dot balls in the next three-quarters of an hour. Meanwhile, wickets fell at the other end, as Trescothick departed for 44, edging a straight ball from Warne to first slip after having taken him for 10 in the previous over, and Bell was out LBW to a ball that did not turn. Three overs later, Vaughan was bowled cleanly by Lee and Flintoff gave a catch to Gilchrist, England were five down for 119, and though Pietersen once again put on more than 40 runs with Geraint Jones, England still needed 301 for the last five wickets, which would mean five partnerships higher than England had managed all match.

Rain frustrated both Australia and neutral fans who wanted to see cricket played on the morning of the fourth day, but at 15:45 BST the rain relented and the covers were taken off. Then, it took 10 overs for Australia to wrap up England's innings, McGrath taking four of the five wickets required and Warne the last; Giles, Hoggard, Harmison and Simon Jones were all dismissed for ducks, and England could only cut 24 runs off Australia's eventual win margin of 239. Twenty-two of those fourth-day runs came from Pietersen who was left stranded on an unbeaten 64 to have a Test batting average of 121 after his first match.

=== Second Test ===
4–8 August
Scorecard

England	v	Australia
407 (79.2 overs); Marcus Trescothick 90 (102); Shane Warne 4/116 (25.2 overs)		308 (76 overs); Justin Langer 82 (154); Andrew Flintoff 3/52 (15 overs)
182 (52.1 overs); Andrew Flintoff 73 (86); Shane Warne 6/46 (23.1 overs)		279 (64.3 overs); Brett Lee 43* (75); Andrew Flintoff 4/79 (22 overs)

England won by 2 runs
Edgbaston, Birmingham
Umpires: Billy Bowden (NZ) and Rudi Koertzen (SA)
Player of the match: Andrew Flintoff (Eng)

- Australia won the toss and elected to field.

The psychological battles before the match included many Australian statements to the press about how the pitch "played into [their] hands", that England had been "spending too much time talking", and that their top order had been "taking bad options". It was also suggested that the team that won the toss should choose to bowl first to stand the best chance of victory, as had happened in 12 of the 13 Tests at Edgbaston since 1991. An hour before the first ball was bowled, Australian seam bowler Glenn McGrath tore the ligaments in his ankle after treading on a stray cricket ball while playing rugby during a pre-match warm-up. Michael Kasprowicz took McGrath's place in the team. Ricky Ponting won the toss and opted to bowl, but Jonathan Agnew of the BBC claimed "it was clear that his decision had backfired" once England started batting, a view supported by Channel 4 analyst Simon Hughes.

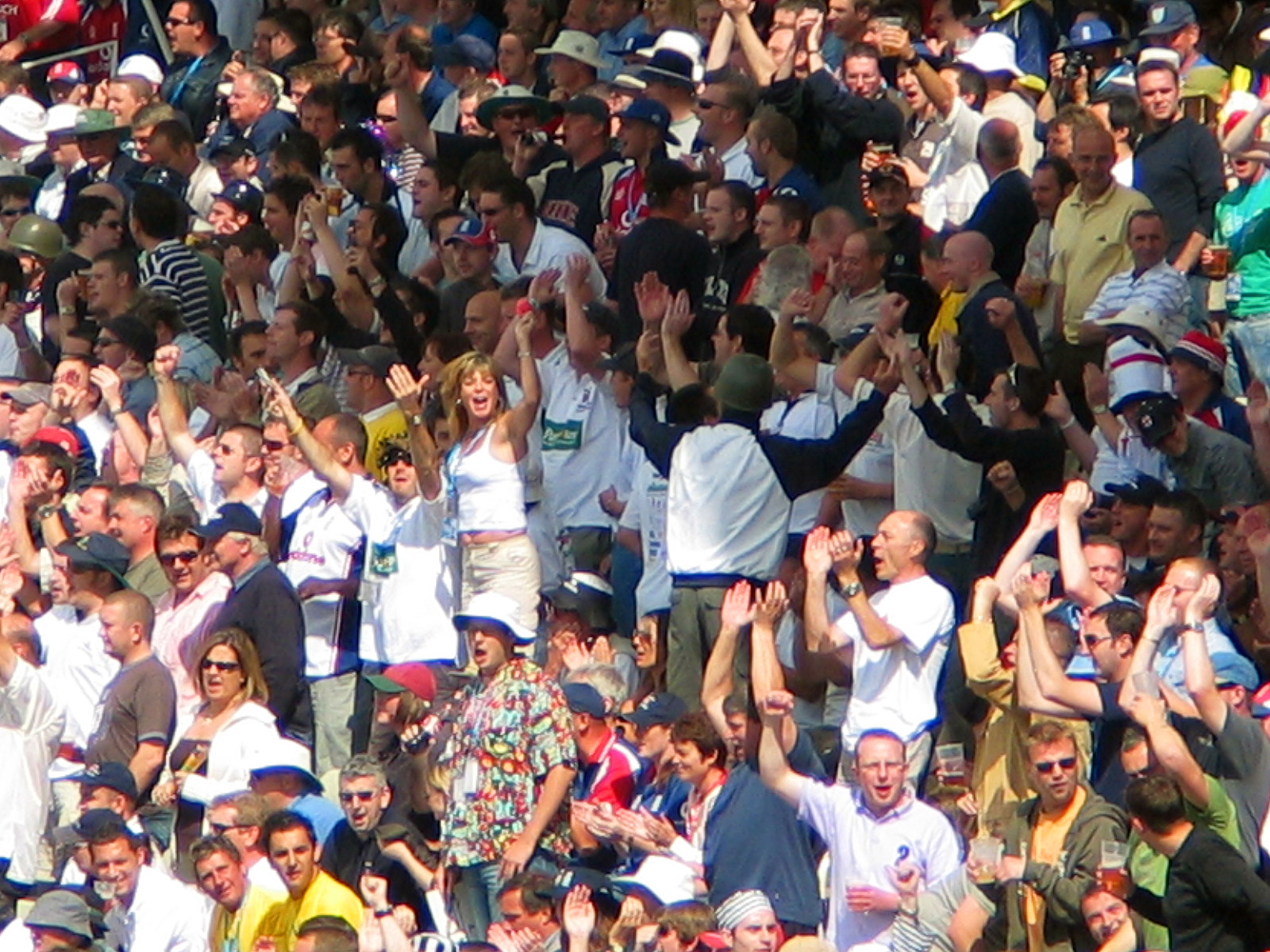
Crowd at the Edgbaston Ashes Test, on day 3

England took advantage of being inserted and came back strongly, becoming the first team to hit 400 runs in a first day of Test cricket against Australia since 1938. The English scored at a pace above four an over in their opening partnership between Marcus Trescothick, who hit nine boundaries off Brett Lee, and Andrew Strauss, who scored freely off Jason Gillespie and Kasprowicz. Their 112-run partnership was the highest by England in the series thus far; the Australians had only surpassed that once, through Damien Martyn and Michael Clarke's 155 at Lord's. Although Warne produced an outstanding delivery to dismiss Strauss bowled for 48, to add to Australia's woes, Trescothick was caught off a no-ball on 32, and eventually went on to make 90, being the second man out shortly after lunch, with the score 164/2 after 32.3 overs.

In the next five overs, England lost both Ian Bell, who notched up his third successive single-figure score, and Michael Vaughan, who pulled a short Gillespie delivery to the hands of Lee, but that did little to slow the scoring rate. 132 runs had been taken in the morning session; the afternoon yielded 157. Kevin Pietersen, in his second Test match, hit ten fours and one six, and made a 103-run partnership in 105 balls with Andrew Flintoff. Flintoff scored 68 off 62 balls, and Lee's 18 balls of the afternoon session were taken for 26 runs, including two sixes.

Lee bowled just 17 overs in England's first innings, and conceded 111 runs, but got the wicket of Pietersen, who pulled to Simon Katich for 71 off 76 balls, and with the score on 342/7 with 24 scheduled overs remaining in the day. Steve Harmison then smacked two fours and a six in a 15-minute cameo worth 17 runs, and Simon Jones stuck around with Matthew Hoggard for a last-wicket partnership of 32, Jones making 19 not out. Shane Warne finally got the better of Hoggard, to end with four wickets for 116, but by that time, England had ended their innings on 407 all out in just under 80 overs. Just as Australia's opening batters walked out and prepared for their innings, rain began to fall on Edgbaston and play had to be stopped.

England's bowlers started well when Harmison bowled a maiden over first up to Justin Langer, and Matthew Hayden drove Harmison's new-ball partner Hoggard to short mid-off for a golden duck – the first of Hayden's Test career. Ponting and Langer then hit runs just as quickly as England had done, before the umpire's finger went up twice more before lunch; Ponting swept a shot off Ashley Giles to the opposing captain Vaughan for 61, and Martyn was run out taking a single for 20, again by Vaughan. Langer and Clarke continued after lunch in the same vein, hitting 76 runs in an hour and a half, but a couple of wickets within five overs took Australia to 208/5, needing 199 for the last five wickets for parity. The partnership between Langer and Adam Gilchrist saw them to tea with no further loss.

The pair looked to close England's lead and batted unbeaten after tea for eight overs, but again the England bowlers intervened, this time in the shape of Simon Jones, whose reverse swing caused the Australian middle and lower order a great deal of problems, and he was rewarded for his efforts when he trapped Langer with a yorker – gone for 82, which was to be Australia's highest score in the innings. Australia's last four, which now included Kasprowicz, who had a batting average 10 runs higher than McGrath, were nevertheless all dismissed for single-figure scores, Flintoff taking the last two men lbw with the last two balls, although there was some argument about whether the first dismissal, that of Gillespie, should have been given. Meanwhile, Giles' return of 3/78, including Ponting, Clarke and Warne, was to be his best bowling figures all series.

England began their second innings with a 99-run lead and looked to continue their aggressive batting intent to build their lead before stumps on day 2. After Trescothick and Strauss had hit five boundaries in six overs and taken the second innings total to 25 for 0, Ponting brought on Warne in the seventh over. Warne broke through with his second ball of the innings with arguably one of the best deliveries of the series by any bowler. Strauss, seeing the ball pitching at least a foot outside his off stump, stepped across his stumps intending to pad it away or leave it to go through the keeper; however, Warne's leg break turned right across Strauss and bowled him behind his legs, hitting middle and leg stump, dismissing England's opener for just 6. Nightwatchman Hoggard survived four balls to end the day, when England held a lead of 124 runs, with nine wickets in hand.

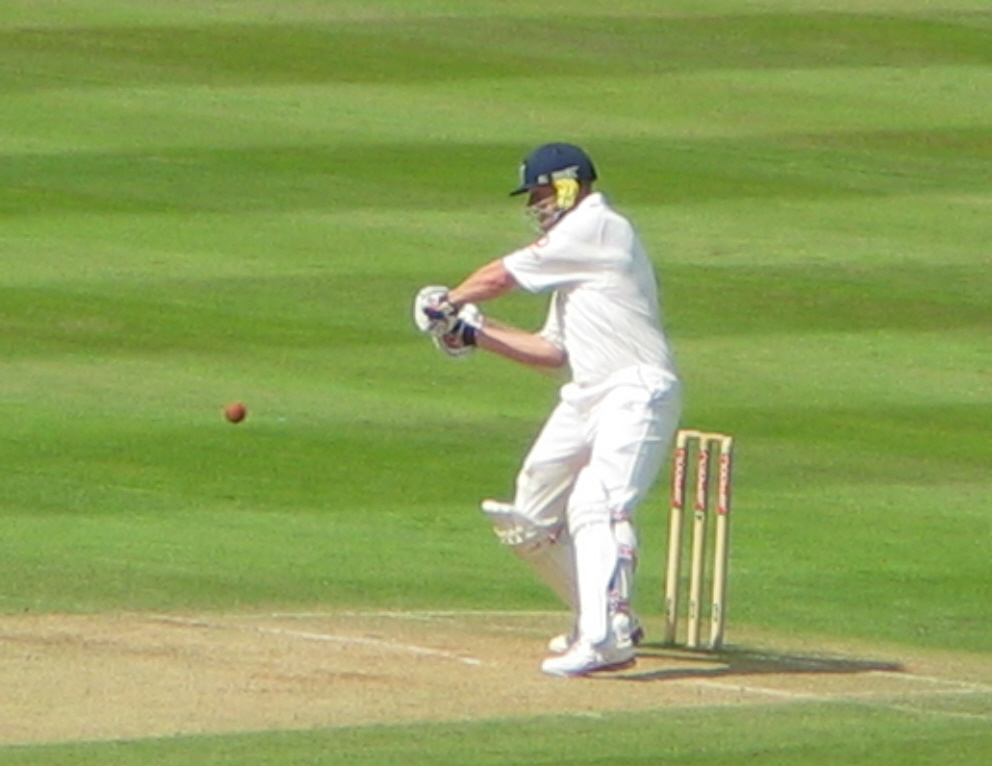
Flintoff hits a six in the Edgbaston Test, day 3

Australia continued their new-found momentum at the start of day 3, as Lee took three wickets in the first 12 minutes of play: Trescothick slashed a wide delivery and got an edge to the keeper, captain Vaughan got his third single-figure score in the series as he failed to cover his stumps to a straight delivery, and Hoggard edged to Hayden in the slips for 1, leaving England 31/4 with Bell and Pietersen at the crease, having lost four wickets for six runs. Pietersen survived what looked like an edge from the first ball he faced, and went on to make 20 before he was given out in a similar situation from Warne. His 41-run partnership with Bell took England's lead past 150, but despite having batted for over an hour, Bell still needed 29 more for his half-century when he gave a tiny edge to Gilchrist.

England's last recognised batting pair, between Flintoff and wicket-keeper Geraint Jones, saw England to lunch, but Flintoff had suffered an injury to his left shoulder and looked in obvious pain, and Jones departed shortly after lunch. Giles lasted longer, batting through 45 minutes before he was caught by Hayden, and Harmison faced one delivery to leave England at 131/9.

Simon Jones and Flintoff carried on, however. Jones managed 12 runs in his 42-minute stay at the crease while Flintoff took Lee for 33 off the 28 balls he faced from the Australian paceman. Flintoff also took runs off Kasprowicz, with his third over yielding 20 runs for England, including a couple of no-balls. At one point during Flintoff's innings, Ponting had nine men on the boundary, with only the bowler and wicket-keeper inside the circle. However, Flintoff hit a six over them, too, and another of his sixes landed on top of the stands. Flintoff ended with 73, as the only man to pass 25 for England, before he was bowled by Warne. Warne finished with figures of 6/46 from 23.1 overs, having bowled unchanged from the seventh over to the end.

Chasing a very realistic target of 282 runs to win, Hayden and Langer started positively, taking runs off the occasional bad balls that were served up by Harmison, Hoggard and Giles, and by the 12th over, they had racked up 47 for no loss, and were well on track until Vaughan brought Flintoff on to bowl. The all-rounder proceeded to bowl the over of the series; although he failed to complete the hat-trick he was on from the previous innings, with his second ball he bowled Langer with a leg cutter. His third delivery was narrowly turned down for lbw, the fourth found Ponting's edge but failed to carry to slip, an lbw appeal on the fifth was also turned down, and his sixth, which Ponting left outside the off stump, was a no-ball, allowing him an extra delivery. Flintoff produced another leg cutter, Ponting edged his drive and was out caught behind. Including the previous innings, Flintoff had taken four wickets in nine balls. But more importantly, Australia had been reduced from 47/0 to 48/2.

Hayden kept going, and his dismissal came in an over where Australia had taken eight runs from the first four balls; however, Simon Jones got the last laugh on Hayden, only to later be reprimanded and fined by the International Cricket Council for his celebrations. England kept on the pressure, getting three more wickets before the scheduled close of play: Giles dismissed Katich and Gilchrist, and an in-swinging ball from Flintoff took care of Gillespie, who was trapped lbw.

An extra half-hour of play was allowed, as a result was nearing, but Warne and Clarke defied the English bowling attack. Warne "took the attacking approach", and took on Giles for 12 in one over. He ended on 20 not out overnight, as Warne and Clarke batted together for 40 minutes before Harmison, bowling his third spell of the day, brought the third day's proceedings to an end with a slower ball that deceived Clarke, who missed the ball completely to be bowled. Mark Nicholas, in live commentary, described the delivery as "...one of the great balls. Given the moment, given the batsman and given the match, that is a staggering gamble that has paid off for Harmison. He bowled it perfectly." The third day saw a total of 17 wickets fall, and England needed just two wickets for victory, while Australia still needed 107 runs.

England were said to be "on the brink of...victory", but Australia came back thanks to two partnerships worth more than 40 to take themselves within three runs of a 2–0 series lead. First, Warne and Lee added 45 for the ninth wicket, before Warne trod on his own stumps after a full Flintoff ball and was out hit wicket. Kasprowicz came in and supported Lee well, fending off aggressive bowling from Flintoff and Harmison, and Simon Jones dropped a difficult chance at third man to remove Kasprowicz with 15 left to get. With Australia edging towards victory, taking the pragmatic and sensible approach of preferring singles to risky boundaries, England were now bowling aggressive short balls at the tail-enders, hoping for short catches or to surprise the batters with yorkers. With four runs needed to win, Lee drove Harmison's attempted yorker towards the cover-point boundary, where it was fielded; it was timed so well that had Lee placed it five yards either team of the fielder's initial position, it would have likely won Australia the match. The batters crossed for a single, leaving three runs to win with the weaker batter Kasprowicz on strike. Harmison delivered another short ball, which Kasprowicz fended off and Geraint Jones took an athletic catch down the leg side. England appealed, and Kasprowicz was given out caught by Bowden. Subsequent replays suggested that the ball contacted Kasprowicz's glove while not in contact with the bat handle and that he should have been given not out, but England were nonetheless declared victors – if in almost the narrowest way possible – and the series was drawn level with three matches left.

After a short engagement with his team in victory celebrations, the subsequent reaction of Flintoff to the winning dismissal was to console the despondent batter, Lee – a gesture which was widely commented upon as indicative of the good sportsmanship and mutual respect between the teams which characterised the series.

England's two-run victory was the narrowest win (by runs) in Ashes cricket history to date (there had been two Ashes Tests won by a margin of only three runs). It was also the second narrowest margin of victory in Test cricket history behind only the West Indies' victory by a single run over Australia in Adelaide in 1993, which was later matched by New Zealand's one-run win over England in Wellington in 2023.

=== Third Test ===
11–15 August
Scorecard

England	v	Australia
444 (113.2 overs); Michael Vaughan 166 (215); Shane Warne 4/99 (33.2 overs)		302 (84.5 overs); Shane Warne 90 (122); Simon Jones 6/53 (17.5 overs)
280/6d (61.5 overs); Andrew Strauss 106 (158); Glenn McGrath 5/115 (20.5 overs)		371/9 (108 overs); Ricky Ponting 156 (275); Andrew Flintoff 4/71 (25 overs)

Match drawn
Old Trafford, Manchester
Umpires: Billy Bowden (NZ) and Steve Bucknor (WI)
Player of the match: Ricky Ponting (Aus)

- England won the toss and elected to bat.
- Rain delayed play on day 3 until 15:00.
- Shane Warne (Aus) claimed his 600th Test wicket.

Day 1

With the series square after England's close win in the second match at Edgbaston in Birmingham, neither team could secure the series win after the third Test at Old Trafford in Manchester, so there was still all to play for. The match began with England winning the toss, and choosing to bat first, thus giving Shane Warne a chance to become the first man to take 600 Test wickets in England's first innings, and he did so by getting Marcus Trescothick out caught behind by Australian wicket-keeper Adam Gilchrist when he mistimed a sweep shot, earning Warne a standing ovation from the Old Trafford faithful.

After naming an unchanged line-up, England were immediately faced by the pairing of Glenn McGrath and Brett Lee. There were doubts about whether they could play before the match started, because of the injuries they had sustained earlier, but they both passed fitness tests. Though Andrew Strauss succumbed in the 10th over, England lost no further wickets before lunch, and only one more before tea. There were many missed opportunities for Australia, who dropped Trescothick, Michael Vaughan (twice) and Ian Bell on the first day, which helped Trescothick and Vaughan to get a partnership of 137 before Trescothick was dismissed after lunch. Vaughan powered on, making his hundred after 206 minutes to become the first man in the series to get a century.

Having made 166 runs, an innings described as "majestic", Vaughan eventually hit Simon Katich straight to McGrath at the boundary, but had still made what was to be the highest individual score in the series. Together with Vaughan, Australia were also faced with a more defiant Bell, who had not passed 25 in his four first innings in the series, but made 59 before the day ended. Picking up where Vaughan left off, Bell, Kevin Pietersen and nightwatchman Matthew Hoggard closed out the day for England with the scoreboard reading 341/5, with Lee adding two wickets to the tally before the end of the day.

Day 2

Bell did not add to his overnight score, being given out caught behind in controversial circumstances, as replays indicated any contact with the ball involved neither bat nor glove. Following a brief rain interval England then lost two more wickets just before lunch, Andrew Flintoff after scoring a quick-fire 46 and Geraint Jones for 42. After lunch Australia quickly dispatched the remaining two wickets for just a further 10 runs, bowling England out for a score of 444, with McGrath finishing on his worst-ever Test figures of 0/86.

Australia started their innings tentatively with Hoggard dropping a low catch from Matthew Hayden off his own bowling. Just before tea Australia lost their first wicket with Hayden out caught at short leg from Ashley Giles first over. After tea Australia lost another couple of wickets, Ricky Ponting caught for seven and Hayden given out lbw for 34. Gilchrist put on 30 before edging the first ball of Simon Jones' spell to Geraint Jones.

This brought in Michael Clarke who had been recuperating at the team hotel after damaging his back on the first day. Owing to this injury, Clarke needed Hayden to act as a runner. Warne made inroads with the bat, just as at Edgbaston four days previously, but Clarke only managed to add seven runs before being deceived by a reverse-swinging delivery from Simon Jones. Warne and Jason Gillespie saw the day out with Warne finishing on 45 not out.

The day finished with Australia on 214/7, 230 behind and needing another 31 runs to avoid a follow-on. The score was adjusted from 210 overnight owing to one of the umpires failing to signal four byes.

Day 3

Rain delayed the start of play until 16:00 BST, and even then only eight overs were possible before play was again suspended, although a further six overs were bowled later on before yet more rain meant that play was abandoned for the day. Australia had the better of the short day's play, adding 50 runs without loss to pass the follow-on target, although Warne was lucky to survive on two occasions thanks to errors by Geraint Jones: with Warne on 55, Jones missed a relatively straightforward stumping opportunity, and on 68 he was dropped after edging a ball from Flintoff. Australia closed on 264/7, still 180 in arrears, but England probably felt that they missed several opportunities to put the game beyond their opponents.

Day 4

Having been hampered by a rain-shortened day three, the Australians were ready to put more wood to the ball on day four, and they did not disappoint. Warne continued his march towards his maiden Test century before holing out with a hook shot to a well-placed Giles at 90. Simon Jones mopped up the other two wickets to bowl Australia out for 302, Jones finishing the innings with a career best figures of 6/53.

Knowing that scoring runs quickly was the only chance they had at winning the match with so much of the previous day's play washed out, England took the fight to the Australians in their second innings. The opening partnership of Strauss and Trescothick scored 26 before the lunch interval, but Trescothick played on to be bowled after scoring 41, giving McGrath his first wicket of the match. Strauss, however, compiled a fine century, his sixth from just 17 matches, scoring 106 before getting out caught. Gilchrist missed two stumping opportunities to remove Bell and failing to hold a catch to remove Flintoff. Bell capitalised on Gilchrist's errors, partnering Strauss for 28 overs and recording a well-deserved 65. Although wickets continued to fall, England were more concerned about scoring quickly than staying at the crease. Trescothick, Strauss and Bell all scored with a strike rate of over 63, and Geraint Jones added 27 runs off just 12 balls before England declared on 280/6 to give them a spell at Australia in the evening and a chance of winning the match the next day. McGrath recorded another five-wicket haul in an innings, but was expensive, giving away 115 runs. Warne, despite bowling 25 overs, failed to take a wicket, recording figures of 0/74.

Australia needed 423 to win, which would be a record fourth innings total to win a match. Australia saw out the last 10 overs without losing a wicket and put on 24 runs. This left the match on a knife edge, with all three results still possible. Australia required 399 runs on the final day to win from a possible 98 overs, while England still needed to take all 10 Australian second innings wickets.

Day 5

Given the performances of the England bowling attack at Edgbaston and in the first innings of this match, English hopes of a win were high. Queues began at 06:00 and by 08:40, more than two hours before the first ball was due to be bowled, the Old Trafford staff closed the gates to the stadium. 20,000 people were left disappointed in addition to the 23,000-capacity crowd. The day started poorly for them with Justin Langer falling for 14 on the seventh ball of the day, nicking a ball delivered by Hoggard behind to Geraint Jones. Australia captain Ricky Ponting was brought to the crease to steady the ship, and he narrowly survived being run out early on. This proved crucial in the context of the match, as the momentum gradually swung in Australia's direction. At one point, Australia racked up runs at such a rate that a win became a real possibility, but Flintoff accounted for the dismissals of Hayden, Katich and Gilchrist, while Harmison got a favourable lbw decision to dismiss Martyn, leaving Australia's middle order in tatters and Ponting holding his team's innings together at 182/5. Michael Clarke provided stouter resistance in a cameo of 39 before a complete misjudgement led him to shoulder arms to a Simon Jones delivery which reverse-swung back into his off stump, sending it cartwheeling backwards.

At 263/6, with 33 overs left to be bowled and 160 runs still required, Australia changed their batting order; instead of sending out the more accomplished and aggressive Warne, the more obdurate and defensively minded Jason Gillespie came to the crease – Australia were no longer playing for the win, they were playing for the draw. This order change, however, did not work: Gillespie lasted just five balls before being trapped plumb lbw off Hoggard for a duck, leaving Australia 264/7, and England now needing just three wickets from the final 31 overs to win the match and go 2–1 up in the series.

Ponting, however, remained as composed and secure as ever, reaching his first and only century of the series. Together with Warne, who continued to frustrate the England bowlers, they added 76 runs for the eighth wicket. Pietersen missed a chance to dismiss Warne, putting down a difficult chance at short midwicket off a Jones full toss, and with 9.5 overs left in the match, England still needed three wickets and Australia required 83 runs. Warne was then finally out in remarkable circumstances, as Strauss put down a regulation catch at second slip off the bowling of Flintoff, only for the ball to rebound off his right thigh and briefly pop up in the air. Geraint Jones flung himself to his right to take a spectacular one-handed catch just above the ground.

Ponting battled on, passing 150, but having spent over seven hours at the crease in a single day, his concentration began to waver and he finally succumbed to Steve Harmison, strangled down the leg side for a remarkable innings of 156 that was good enough to earn him man of the match honours. After the dismissal of Ponting, Australia were 354/9 with only four overs remaining, and another thrilling climax occurred with England having a real chance of snatching victory in similar fashion to the second Test; however, the unfancied pairing of Lee and McGrath handled the remaining 24 deliveries to finish on 371/9, 52 short of victory but sufficient to draw the game and leave the series tied at 1–1.

=== Fourth Test ===
25–28 August
Scorecard

England	v	Australia
477 (123.1 overs); Andrew Flintoff 102 (132); Shane Warne 4/102 (29.1 overs)		218 (49.1 overs); Brett Lee 47 (44); Simon Jones 5/44 (14.1 overs)
129/7 (31.5 overs); Marcus Trescothick 27 (22); Shane Warne 4/31 (13.5 overs)		387 (f/o) (124 overs); Justin Langer 61 (112); Steve Harmison 3/93 (30 overs)

England won by 3 wickets
Trent Bridge, Nottingham
Umpires: Aleem Dar (Pak) and Steve Bucknor (WI)
Player of the match: Andrew Flintoff (Eng)

- England won the toss and elected to bat.
- Shaun Tait (Aus) made his Test debut.

Day 1

Glenn McGrath was once again ruled out because of injury, this time to his elbow, and Australia also dropped the out-of-form Jason Gillespie, leaving them with a seam attack of Brett Lee, debutant Shaun Tait and Michael Kasprowicz. England, having been on top in the last two Tests, were unchanged.

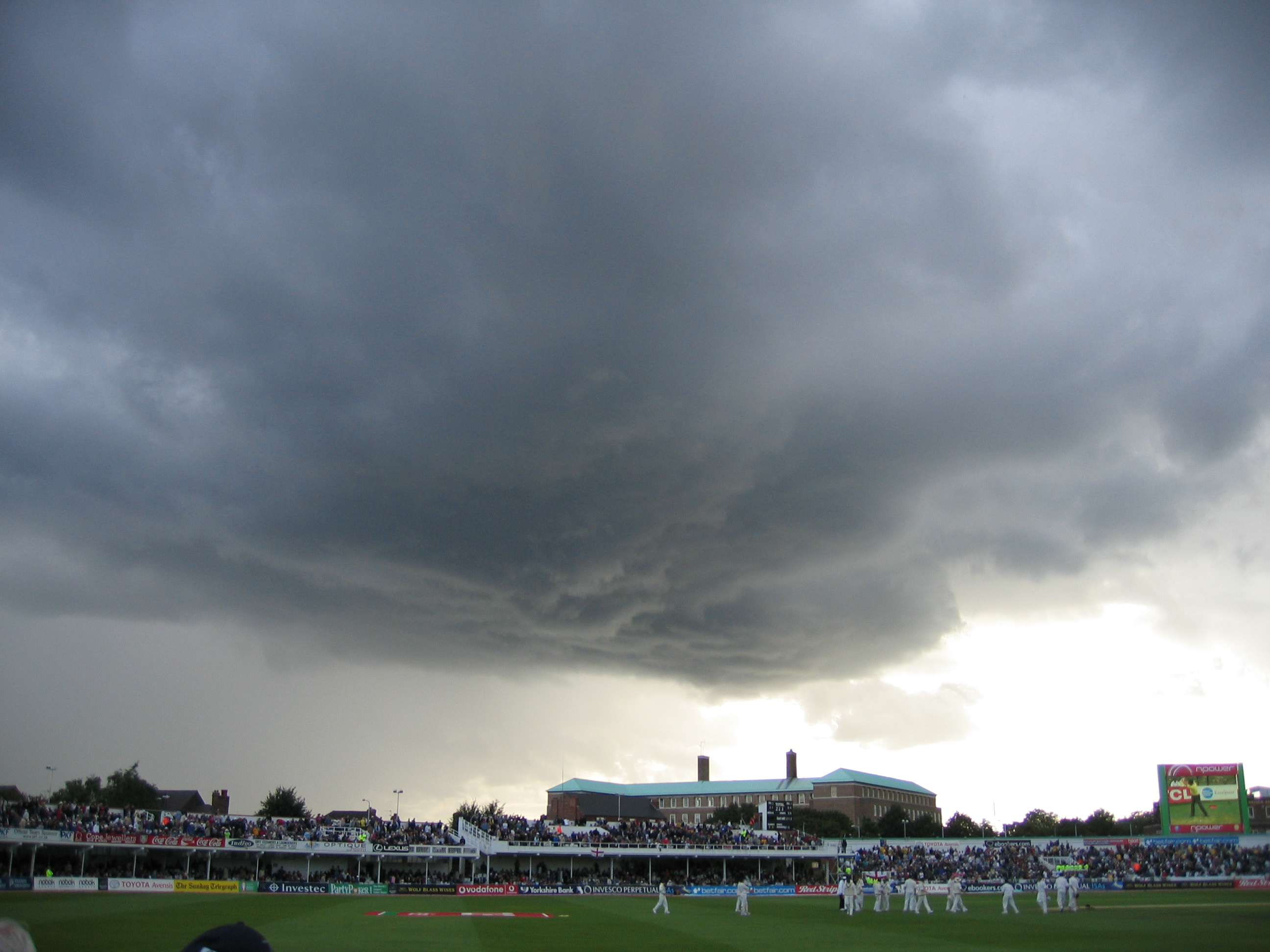
Rain stopped play in the first day's evening session

England won the toss and chose to bat, and they got off to a strong start. Boosted by no-balls from the seamers – a total of 18 before lunch – Marcus Trescothick and Andrew Strauss scored runs quickly and easily, and enjoyed batting on a pitch which gave the bowlers no aid. They recorded their second 100-run opening partnership of the series, before Strauss was freakishly dismissed for 35, sweeping Shane Warne onto his boot and into Matthew Hayden's waiting hands at slip – a wicket confirmed by the third umpire. Michael Vaughan continued on his fine form from Old Trafford, though, punishing bad balls from Lee to go into lunch with his score on 14. Trescothick, meanwhile, rode his luck, as he was bowled off a no-ball on 55, much to Lee's displeasure. At lunch England were 129/1.

Only 3.1 overs were possible in the afternoon session, owing to rain. Coming back after tea, England immediately lost two wickets to Tait, who used the cloud cover to good effect and swung the ball well. However, Vaughan and Kevin Pietersen batted well together for a 67-run partnership, although they were each dropped once. Towards the end of the day, Ricky Ponting brought himself on, and his medium pace yielded a wicket – that of Vaughan for 58. Overnight, the match was evenly poised with England 229/4.

Day 2

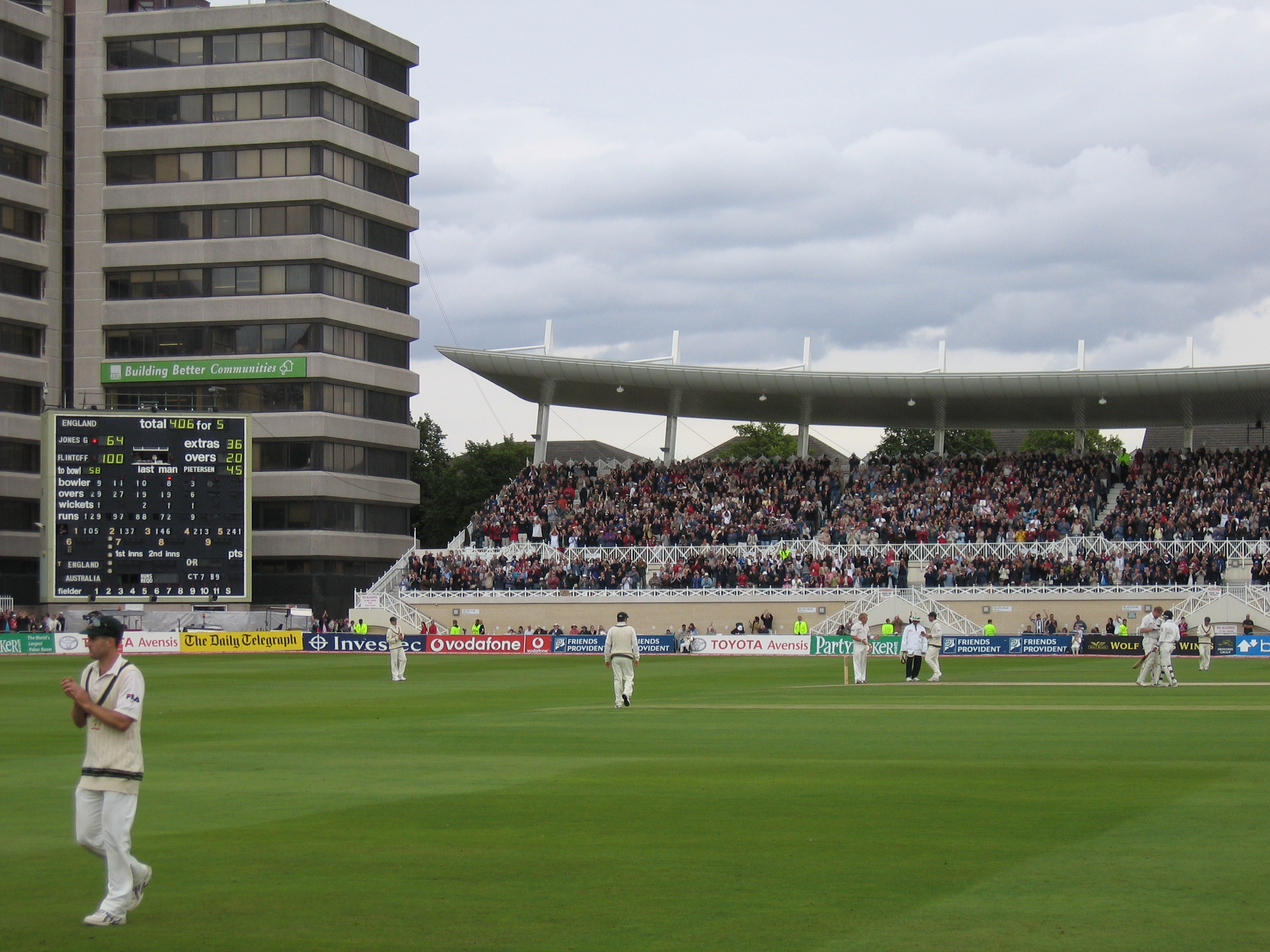
Flintoff reaches 100

Australia dismissed Pietersen at the beginning of the morning's play, edging a full outswinger from Lee through to wicket-keeper Adam Gilchrist, leaving England at 241/5; however, an unbeaten century partnership from Andrew Flintoff and Geraint Jones took England's score to 344/5 at lunch.

After the interval, the pair continued to score quickly for another hour, and extended their partnership to 177 before Flintoff was lbw to Tait for 102, his first Test century against Australia. The loss of Flintoff did not deter the English, as Jones continued to hit runs through the off side on the way to his highest score against the Australians, making 85 before he was caught and bowled by Kasprowicz. The next two wickets fell quickly, but a stubborn last-wicket partnership of 23 between Matthew Hoggard and Simon Jones – including an incident where the ball hit the stumps but the bails failed to fall off – saw England to 477 all out at tea.

In the evening session, England's bowlers, especially Hoggard, managed to find much more swing than the Australian bowlers had done, and ripped through the Australian top order. The first three wickets fell in a crucial period of 11 balls (although the third, which dismissed Damien Martyn lbw, was a poor decision – television replays indicated that the ball hit the bat before the body). By the close of play, Australia had been reduced to 99/5 to complete a successful day for England.

Day 3

Katich and Gilchrist decided that attack was the best form of defence, adding 58 in only 8.5 overs in the morning, before England came back to take the next four wickets for the addition of only 18 runs, leaving Australia perilously placed at 175/9. Simon Jones was the main culprit, using swing to good effect as he removed Katich and Warne in successive balls, and then had Kasprowicz clean-bowled. Lee added 47 in 44 balls, including three huge sixes, to take Australia's score to 218, before he was caught off Jones' bowling to give Jones his fifth wicket of the innings. Despite their aggressive batting, Australia therefore finished the first innings 259 runs behind.

Vaughan then took a huge gamble by forcing the visitors to follow on (the first time Australia had followed on in 17 years and 190 Tests, as they had not been made to follow on since facing Pakistan in Karachi in 1988). Vaughan's decision made a draw far less likely, but in an almost Australian style of ruthlessness, it was clear that England were not going to be cowed by the visitors' reputation: they were playing to win. Shane Warne, however, was optimistic of his team's chances despite the first innings deficit; when Simon Katich asked him before their second innings how many runs they would need, Warne replied saying that if they could give themselves a lead of at least 170 runs, they stood a very real chance of winning the match with the wicket gradually deteriorating.

Australia began their second innings very positively; they safely reached 14 without loss before the lunch break, and then powered on in the afternoon session, adding 100 more runs before tea, and only losing Hayden for 26. For England, the afternoon session was their worst of the match; to compound their misery, Simon Jones showed signs of injury, and Strauss dropped Justin Langer on 38.

In the evening session, England fought back and managed to take three wickets, but also dropped a catch and missed a stumping. Australia finished the day still 37 runs in arrears but with only six wickets in hand. Simon Jones also went off the field during the evening session with an ankle injury, and was taken to hospital for a scan. While Jones was off the field receiving attention, specialist substitute fielder Gary Pratt ran out Australia captain Ponting. As he left the field, Ponting expressed his displeasure to the England dressing room at their frequent use of subs during the series, allegedly to keep their key bowlers fresh. Although there was no legal stipulation against it, England's use of the substitute rule was met with criticism from several commentators, with many believing this tactic to be against the spirit of the game; however, in this particular case, Simon Jones was legitimately injured – indeed, this injury was one of many that would contribute to him never playing international cricket again – and so Pratt's presence on the field was entirely fair.

Day 4

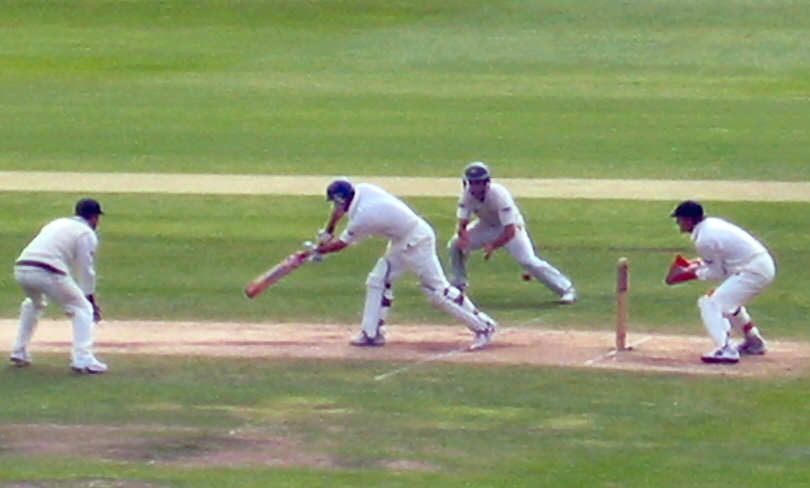
Andrew Strauss plays forward to Shane Warne, with Michael Clarke waiting to take the catch

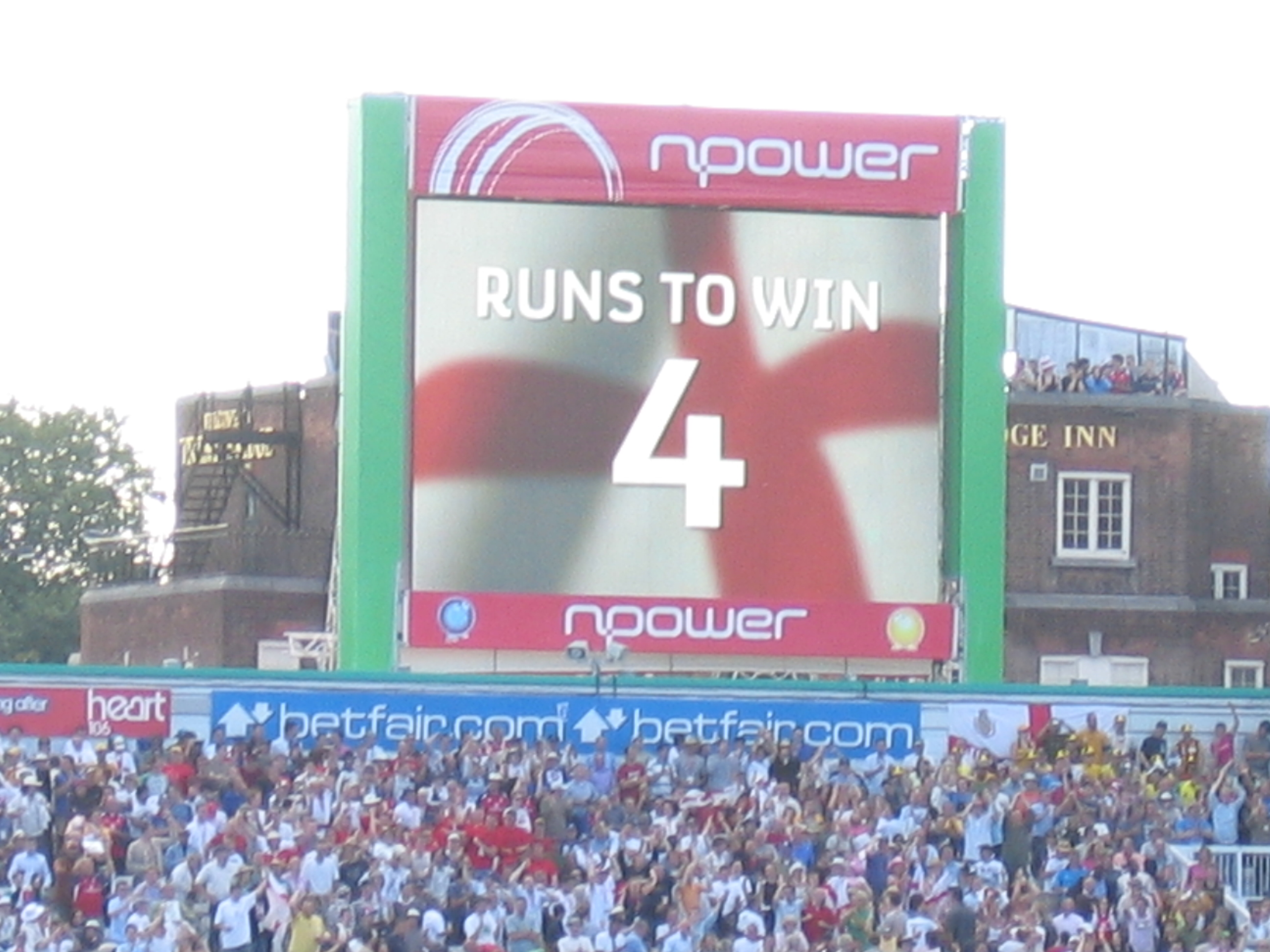
England fans celebrate, as the hosts need four runs to win, on day 4

Day Four began in earnest with Michael Clarke and Katich continuing their partnership from the previous day. However, Katich had already twice flirted with dismissal, saved only by chance both times. In the words of BBC cricket commentator Henry Blofeld, "It's very much a game of chess – white-flannelled figures on green grass." The English and the Australians proceeded into a cold war for a good part of the morning, with England attempting to frustrate the Australian batting, but with the latter refusing to take the bait. England's lead slowly evaporated without a wicket falling, but Hoggard's taking of Clarke's and then Gilchrist's scalps on either side of the lunch break swung the initiative back into England's hands.

The injury to Simon Jones became somewhat obvious as the pacers struggled to capture the magic that Jones had created the previous day that had forced Australia to follow on. Despite this, the Australian run rate remained low as both teams stared each other down. Mistakes by Geraint Jones and Pietersen were quickly nullified by the dismissal of Warne for 45 and Kasprowicz for 19, and after a few overs' resistance, Tait was bowled middle stump for 4 and Australia were all out for 387. Although this score was the most runs the Australian batting line-up scored in any innings in the series, it left England requiring just 129 runs to win the match, well short of Shane Warne's target of 170.

Trescothick started the chase positively, scoring 27 from 22 balls and helping England to 32 without loss in just 5 overs. With Kasprowicz conceding 19 runs from his first two (and what would turn out to be only) overs in the innings, knowing he had little option without McGrath in his bowling line-up, Ponting brought Warne on to bowl in the hopes that he could somehow seize the initiative. Warne struck with his very first ball, having Trescothick caught at silly point, before removing Vaughan, who was caught at slip for a six-ball duck, and then Strauss few overs later, caught at leg slip for 23. Brett Lee complemented Warne with some aggressive, short-pitched bowling and had Bell caught in the deep after an ill-advised hook shot for just 3. From 32 without loss, England's top order had collapsed to 57/4 and the game was suddenly very much in the balance. Flintoff and Pietersen rode their luck with some risky shots to edge England ever closer to their target with an invaluable partnership of 46, before Lee had Pietersen well caught by Gilchrist and then produced a jaffa to castle Flintoff and leave England at 111/6, still 18 runs short of victory. Geraint Jones' dismissal by Warne for 3 left only three wickets remaining, and the tension was so great that every run at this point was met with an eruption of cheers from the Trent Bridge crowd. Ashley Giles and Hoggard, under immense pressure, slowly chipped away at the required runs, before Hoggard hit a boundary off a Lee full-toss to leave England needing just four runs to win. Warne was then mere millimetres away from having Giles clean-bowled in the next over, before Giles successfully guided England home by hitting the winning runs off Warne through midwicket. Man of the match honours went to Flintoff for his first-innings century and crucial 26 second-innings runs. More importantly, however, this gave England a crucial 2–1 lead heading back to London for the fifth and final Test, ensuring that they could not lose the series; however, with the Ashes going to Australia in the event of a drawn series, there was still all to play for at The Oval.

=== Fifth Test ===
8–12 September
Scorecard

England	v	Australia
373 (105.3 overs); Andrew Strauss 129 (210); Shane Warne 6/122 (37.3 overs)		367 (107.1 overs); Matthew Hayden 138 (303); Andrew Flintoff 5/78 (34 overs)
335 (91.3 overs); Kevin Pietersen 158 (187); Shane Warne 6/124 (38.3 overs)		4/0 (0.4 overs)

Match drawn
The Oval, London
Umpires: Billy Bowden (NZ) and Rudi Koertzen (SA)
Player of the match: Kevin Pietersen (Eng)

- England won the toss and elected to bat.
- No play was possible after tea on day 2 due to rain
- 8 overs added to day 3 to make up for lost time.
- Play delayed until 10:30 on day 3 because of wet conditions.
- Play called off 7 minutes early on day 3 because of bad light.
- Play stopped at 15:42 on day 4 because of bad light; play abandoned at 18:15.

Team changes

Australia named Glenn McGrath, recovered from an elbow injury, to replace Michael Kasprowicz. England's Simon Jones did not recover from his ankle injury from the previous Test in time to be included in the England team, and was replaced after much speculation by all-rounder Paul Collingwood, in preference to specialist fast bowler James Anderson. This meant that, when England came to bowl, Vaughan would have to find some way of allocating what would have been the 4th seamer's overs between his remaining three seamers of Harmison, Hoggard and Flintoff.

Day 1

With the fate of the Ashes urn on the line, the proverbial first blood was drawn by England as Michael Vaughan won his third toss of the series (much to the delight of the partisan Oval crowd). Vaughan elected to have his team bat first with the intent to try and bat Australia out of the game. Certain forecasts for London called for showers sometime during the weekend, which, it was thought, might wipe up to a day of action or more from the ledger. If England could bat long and score heavily, it would make chances of an Australian victory almost impossible. Marcus Trescothick and Andrew Strauss began with an 82-run partnership for the first wicket, but Shane Warne once again proved to be England's undoing. Hayden took a fantastic low catch at slip to dismiss Trescothick for 43, while Vaughan gave away a soft dismissal by hitting a rare poor delivery from Warne straight to Clarke at midwicket for 11. Bell fell to Warne shortly afterwards without scoring, and England went to lunch on 115/3.

Warne continued after lunch by taking his fourth wicket of the innings, clean-bowling Kevin Pietersen for 14 and leaving England in trouble at 131/4. Andrew Flintoff emerged to form a vital partnership of 143 with Strauss, before to falling to McGrath for 72 an hour after tea. Strauss, however, went on to pass 100, becoming the only player from either team to do so twice in the series. Paul Collingwood, making his first appearance in an England Test for two years, made just 7 before being trapped lbw by a Tait yorker, before Strauss was dismissed late in the day for 129 by Warne off an acrobatic catch by Simon Katich. The day ended with Geraint Jones and Ashley Giles at the crease, with England 319/7.

Day 2

Day two began positively for the Australians, with Jones being bowled for 25 off Brett Lee and Matthew Hoggard managing a meagre 2 before being dismissed by McGrath. However, Giles and Steve Harmison frustrated the Australians by taking the score past 370, before Warne trapped Giles lbw shortly before midday, leaving England all out for 373.

The Australian first innings got off to a solid start, with Justin Langer forging a 100-partnership with fellow opener Matthew Hayden – the only opening-partnership century of the series by the Australians. Langer played some blistering strokes off Giles' bowling in particular, but survived a sharp chance to Trescothick at first slip. The Australians were offered the light immediately after tea, despite the English protesting and wanting to bowl Giles. The Australians surprised many by accepting the umpires' offer – many thought that, given they needed to win the test to retain the Ashes, they would want to use as much time available for batting as possible – and the light never improved, with light rain coming down later. Thus, the day concluded with Australia 112/0, still 261 runs behind England.

Day 3

After a delay for wet field conditions, the third day began with a flurry of action, as both Langer and Hayden had close calls with lbw appeals, which replays suggested should have been out, and shies at the stumps that just missed. However, no batter was given out in the morning session, where only 14 overs of play was possible, owing to rain. Australia added 45 runs in that time.

After lunch Hayden and Langer continued their solid batting, frustrating the England bowlers, with Langer reaching his 22nd Test century. Shortly afterwards, England gained a minor victory as Harmison dismissed Langer, who departed to a rapturous ovation for 105. Ricky Ponting should then have been dismissed for a bat-pad catch off Giles, but Bowden turned down the appeal. Hayden also achieved three-figure success later in the day – his first century for over a year, while Flintoff's hostile and accurate bowling was rewarded with the wicket of Ponting, caught at slip by Strauss. With this wicket, Flintoff equalled Ian Botham's hitherto unique achievement of 300 runs and 20 wickets in an Ashes series. Flintoff had a later appeal for a catch behind turned down by Rudi Koertzen, despite it hitting the bat.

The Australian batters once again surprisingly ended the day early by accepting another offer of bad light, bringing a much-interrupted day to a close after only 45.4 overs. Thanks to dogged batting and at least four umpiring decisions in their favour on the third day, they finished 96 runs behind with eight wickets of their first innings intact on 277/2.

Day 4

The fourth day started brightly for England, Damien Martyn hooking a short ball from Flintoff straight into the hands of Collingwood, in the third over of the day, having added only one to his overnight score of nine. Flintoff's bowling led to further wickets, bringing Hayden's knock to an end as he was adjudged lbw, and he trapped Katich lbw the very next over for 1. Taking into account his bowling the previous evening, Flintoff had bowled a remarkable spell of 18 overs in a row and claiming three key wickets in the process. Hoggard then had Adam Gilchrist trapped in front LBW with an inswinger at the stroke of lunch. Gilchrist, however, had added a quick 23 that could have proven vital, as Australia went into the pavilion 17 runs behind still with four wickets in hand.

However, it only took six post-lunch overs for England to end the Australian effort. Jones dropped a catch off Michael Clarke's bat, but it did not prove to be crucial, as Clarke was lbw to Hoggard in the next over. Warne and McGrath both went for ducks, caught off a mistimed hook and in the slips respectively. Finally Hoggard had Lee (6) caught in the deep and Australia were bowled out for 367. Flintoff finished with 5/78 off 34 overs, the second five-for of his career, while Hoggard's 4/97 was his best return of the series.

Thus England, who had expected to begin their second innings chasing a hundred runs or more, were actually leading by six as they took up their bats in mid-afternoon. Australia took a very quick wicket, that of Strauss, who was dismissed again by Warne, caught bat-and-pad by Katich for a solitary run. The wicket was Warne's 167th against England, equalling Dennis Lillee's Ashes bowling record. 11 balls after this dismissal, umpires Rudi Koertzen and Billy Bowden judged it unfair to continue play, owing to inadequate light. One additional session of play was subsequently possible, taking England to a 40-run lead without further loss, before poor light ended the day with England at 34/1.

Day 5

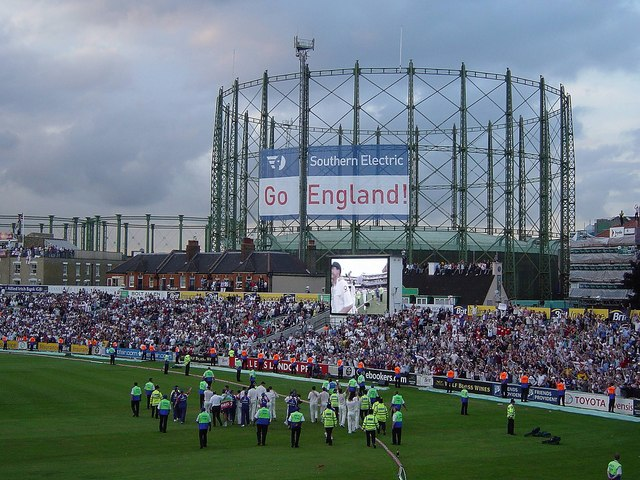
England take a lap of honour beneath the Oval Gasholders, 12 September 2005

The fifth day began with the game still finely balanced. England's task was simple: bat out the day, and they would win the Ashes. In one final attempt to wrest the series from England's grip, Ponting put his trust in his two proven wicket-takers, McGrath and Warne. Going into the day's play, both knew that this would be the last test match either man would play on English soil.

England batted well for 40 minutes, with Vaughan taking the game to the Australian bowlers, but McGrath produced two beautiful deliveries in successive balls: Vaughan was first caught by a full-length, one-handed dive from Gilchrist for 45, before Ian Bell (for a pair) was caught at slip by Warne. McGrath appeared to have secured a hat-trick by having Pietersen caught by Ponting in the slips off the top edge of his bat, but despite a furious appeal, umpire Bowden, in what proved to be arguably the single most important umpiring decision of the entire series, correctly adjudged that the ball had hit Pietersen's shoulder, not the bat. Despite the momentum having swung in the Australians' favour, their charge was not helped by a couple of dropped catches: first by Hayden at slip off the bowling of Warne, and then Warne putting down a simple chance at slip off Lee. Warne, however, atoned for his errors, producing huge amounts of spin to give Trescothick all sorts of problems before finally trapping him lbw for 33, and then had Flintoff caught and bowled just before the lunch interval, leaving England 133 runs ahead with five wickets remaining. Pietersen, meanwhile, continued to have near misses, narrowly beating a Michael Clarke run-out throw and having a Brett Lee bouncer hit his glove and balloon over the entire slip cordon.

During the lunch break, Pietersen, who had been on the receiving end of some incredibly fast, aggressive short-pitched bowling from Lee before the interval, asked his captain Michael Vaughan how he should play the situation from here on in. Vaughan replied by saying, "Your way". Pietersen took his captain at his word and proceeded to dispatch Lee to all parts of the ground, including launching him for two sixes over long leg and a baseball-like swat straight back past him for four. With support from Collingwood, Pietersen anchored the afternoon session almost single-handedly, reaching his maiden Test century just before tea. Collingwood occupied the crease for over an hour before he was caught acrobatically at silly mid-off by Ponting for 10, but Jones was then bowled when he was deceived by a quick Shaun Tait delivery for just 1. England reached tea at 221/7 with a lead of 227, but with only three second-innings wickets remaining and still 49 overs left to be played, Australia were still very much in with a chance if they could take the last three wickets quickly.

Pietersen and Giles added 109 runs in 26 overs. During the 71st and 72nd overs, Pietersen hit sixes from deliveries by Brett Lee and Shane Warne. He scored 158, including 15 fours and seven sixes, before being dismissed by Glenn McGrath with the new ball. Warne congratulated Pietersen as he left the field. Shortly afterwards, Richie Benaud completed his final commentary for British television.

Giles, meanwhile, played the greatest innings of his Test career, hitting seven boundaries on his way to a score of 59 – the highest total he ever achieved in a Test innings – before Warne produced one final moment of magic and bowled Giles round his legs. Harmison was caught at slip by Matthew Hayden just two balls later for a duck, and England were all out for 335.

As the Australians began their innings with less than 19 overs left in the game, it was clear that not enough time remained for them to make up the 341 runs by which they trailed. They were offered the light after just four balls, and having accepted it, both teams had to return to the dressing rooms to wait for a formal finish. The situation became somewhat farcical. With the match effectively over, the crowd were eager for the Ashes to be presented to England, and the celebrations to begin. At 18:17 BST, after a period of some uncertainty and confusion, umpires Koertzen and Bowden removed the bails and pulled up the stumps to signal the end of the match. Australia had scored just four leg byes in their second innings, making it the only innings in Test cricket history in which every run was an extra. With this fifth and final Test declared as a draw, England took the series 2–1, regaining the Ashes they had lost in 1989 and securing a first series win since 1986–87.

Pietersen, having scored his maiden Test century at such a crucial point in the match and series, was voted man of the match by Channel 4 viewers. Flintoff, who led all England bowlers with 24 wickets at an average of 27.29 and scored 402 runs at an average of 40.20, was chosen by Australia coach John Buchanan as England's Man of the Series, while England coach Duncan Fletcher selected Warne for Australia, in recognition of his tally of 40 wickets, the most in the standard five-match Ashes format since Jim Laker's 46 in 1956, at a staggering average of 19.92 and for scoring more runs in the series than many recognised batters, including Gilchrist, Katich, Bell, Martyn and Geraint Jones. The new Compton–Miller Medal for the overall man of the series (as selected by each team's chairman of selectors, Trevor Hohns and David Graveney) was also presented to Flintoff. Finally, the replica urn was presented to Vaughan, commemorating the home team's victory.

== Records ==
=== Individual records ===
Statistic	England	Australia
Most runs	473 – Kevin Pietersen	394 – Justin Langer
Highest individual innings	166 – Michael Vaughan	156 – Ricky Ponting
Highest match total	180 – Michael Vaughan	163 – Ricky Ponting
Most centuries	2 – Andrew Strauss	1 – Justin Langer, Ricky Ponting, Matthew Hayden
Most fifties	3 – Kevin Pietersen, Marcus Trescothick, Andrew Flintoff	2 – Justin Langer, Michael Clarke, Simon Katich
Most sixes	14 – Kevin Pietersen	5 – Shane Warne
Most fours	64 – Marcus Trescothick	48 – Justin Langer, Michael Clarke
Most wickets	24 – Andrew Flintoff	40 – Shane Warne
Best innings bowling	17.5–6–53–6 – Simon Jones	23.1–7–48–6 – Shane Warne
Best match bowling	39–6–97–8 – Steve Harmison	76–8–246–12 – Shane Warne
Most catches (excluding wicket-keepers)	8 – Ian Bell	10 – Matthew Hayden
Most dismissals (wicket-keepers)	16 (15 catches, 1 stumping) – Geraint Jones	19 (18 catches, 1 stumping) – Adam Gilchrist

=== Team records ===
Statistic	England	Australia
Highest innings total	477	387
Lowest innings total	155	190
Tosses won	3	2

=== Other records ===
- Shane Warne became the all-time leading wicket-taker in Ashes series, having taken a total of 172.
  - He also passed the 600 wicket mark, and had 623 by the end of the series.
- Glenn McGrath passed the 500 wicket milestone, and ended up with 518.
- Andrew Flintoff became the first Englishman to take over 20 wickets and score 400 runs (24 wickets and 402 runs) in a Test series.

== Legacy ==
=== Post-match reactions ===
Immediately following the final match, Elizabeth II sent a congratulatory memo to Michael Vaughan and the team, saying: "My warmest congratulations to you, the England cricket team and all in the squad for the magnificent achievement of regaining the Ashes... both teams can take credit for giving us all such a wonderfully exciting and entertaining summer of cricket at its best."

Political leaders like Prime Minister Tony Blair, Conservative leader Michael Howard and Liberal Democrat leader Charles Kennedy also sent their congratulations. Blair stated that "By bringing the Ashes back after so long, you have given cricket a huge boost and lit up the whole summer".

Howard added "... Vaughan, his team, and all involved, should be proud of this achievement and the manner in which they have played during this extraordinary summer of excitement and tension."

"England's victory is historic, and I send hearty congratulations to the team... It has been impossible not to get caught up by the excitement and sense of good will in the past few days," stated Kennedy.

On the other end of the ledger, Australia's Prime Minister, John Howard (who was in New York for a UN summit and was given the bad news by an aide during a luncheon with the Asia Society) was gracious in his congratulations to England.

"Look, there's natural disappointment but it's a situation where you give credit to the team that won," Howard stated, noting that there would not be a national day of mourning. "They will no doubt celebrate and that will be difficult for some, but that's the nature of these contests and we should not take anything away from England...They played very well. It's the best team that England has had for a very long period of time."

=== England team parade ===
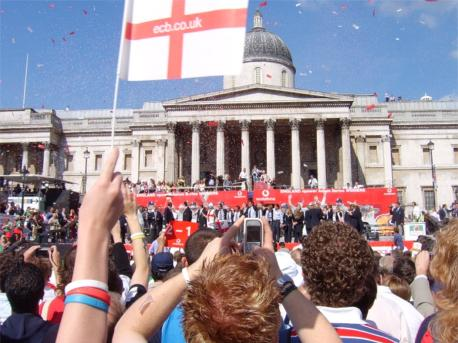
The victorious England team received a ticker-tape reception the day after the series concluded.

On 13 September, England, along with their Women's Ashes-winning counterparts, were feted with a 90-minute bus tour from Mansion House to Trafalgar Square, where they were greeted by tens of thousands of people in a celebration of their momentous achievements (to the surprise of Matthew Hoggard, who expected "three men and a dog").

Thousands of people also lined the streets along the parade route as the two buses made their way to Trafalgar Square. While the rest of the team simply enjoyed the sights, 5th Test Man-of-the-Match Kevin Pietersen sprayed champagne from the bus onto joyous revelers on the street, while wicketkeeper Geraint Jones held onto a Dalek doll with the words "Australians exterminated" attached to it.

At Trafalgar Square, the crowd was treated to a victory celebration for both England teams, and before the ceremony closed the square broke into a rendition of "Jerusalem", which had become an unofficial hymn for the team during the 5th Test. Interviews were carried out with all members of the men's team and Clare Connor, the captain of the women's team, by David Gower and Mark Nicholas, while the ceremony was broadcast live in the UK on BBC One, Channel 4 and Sky Sports News and around the world. Afterwards, the team was entertained by the Prime Minister as guests of honour at 10 Downing Street, then returned the urn to its sacred home at Lord's for safekeeping.

=== Australian criticism ===
Almost immediately criticism began in Australia; The Sydney Morning Herald immediately took issue with the fact that not only was captain Ricky Ponting out-thought by his opposite number Vaughan but the team was too old and simply did not score the runs when they were needed. The Age of Melbourne criticised the team for opening their big mouths once too often, hitting at Australia's earlier whitewash boast. Psychological warfare, The Age went on to state, is great when it works but when it backfires those who are responsible ought to be brought to account.

Former fast bowler Dennis Lillee was particularly scathing. Writing in Perth's The West Australian, he stated that all who perpetrated this "disaster" must be sacked and Shane Warne be appointed the captain in place of Ponting (because of how Warne had delivered time and time again in the series). Losing to other teams is not the end of the world, stated Lillee, but losing the Ashes is.

Former captain Steve Waugh defended the team, calling it "a very good team, a really experienced team. They will be disappointed but they will move on from it" he said, but also conceding that the selectors were likely to ponder a few changes given that only three of the Australia team at The Oval were aged under 30. "They'll have a couple of players in mind which they will bring in the team over the next couple of years".

Along with Waugh, selector and former batter David Boon defended their selections. "Sometimes you're going to have to make a hard decision to keep a subtle rotation going through so you don't have mass retirements...But you've also got to pick the best cricket team you possibly can to represent your country", he stated. "If we keep producing cricketers who are 25 plus, they're mature, they're ready to play, they've still got a seven or eight-year career, then we're doing OK."

=== Ponting hits back, the axe falls ===
Ponting was confronted by a large media pack shortly after his arrival at Sydney Airport and said he was not aware of Lillee's comments. "I'm not concerned about those things. As long as I am doing the right thing by everyone in my dressing room as the team and the coaching staff, well then that's all I can do... But as long as I am looking after the guys in my dressing room, then I'll be happy," Ponting stated, adding that he wished to remain captain.

Ponting also responded to Lillee's comments that Warne should be captain, and that he made more decisions than Ponting during the series: "I like to talk to a lot of guys out on the field and use their ideas and thoughts. I'll go to Gilly [Adam Gilchrist] and even Matty Hayden, Justin Langer, Damien Martyn... The way I think is not going to be right 100 percent of the time, but that's the way I do it. Warne has got a cricket brain as good as anybody around. But I wouldn't agree [he was the pseudo captain]."

Regardless, when the Australian team for the ICC Super Series was announced, three members of the Ashes-losing team were dropped: Damien Martyn was retained only for the ODI squad, while Jason Gillespie and Michael Kasprowicz were dropped altogether. Brad Hodge, Stuart MacGill and Shane Watson were added in their places. While Cricket Australia officials assured that these omissions were not a signal that the Test careers of these three players were over, many experts said otherwise. However, all three players made successful returns to the Test team in early 2006. Lillee once again called for the replacement of Ponting as captain with Warne after the squad announcement, however this was once again rejected.

=== England's epilogue ===
With England's victory in the series, the top of the ICC Test Championship rankings ladder changed slightly as the English closed in on the top-ranked Aussies. In a BBC interview the week after the series, Simon Jones claimed that the English should one day be regarded as the best, despite statistics and the Test Championship rankings speaking otherwise.

"The Ashes series was talked about so much. People were wondering if England could do it and Glenn McGrath said Australia would win 5–0, but we beat them 2–1 and could have been 3–1 up after Old Trafford," Jones told the BBC. "Australia are statistically the best team in the world, and rightly so. They've played so much great cricket over the past 10 years and built up an advantage on the points system... But I think that's changing and hopefully we will have the mantle one day."

Meanwhile, as Pakistan and India prepared for the Ashes winners' visit in the winter, with the Pakistanis relishing the opportunity to test their mettle against the team that took down the Australians, Pakistan coach Bob Woolmer stated, "England have done well but they have still to create that aura of invincibility of the West Indies of the 1970s and 80s and Australia recently. The team which does well in all three departments will win the series and we have to be very disciplined against England, who have quality batsmen and bowlers." Pakistan later defeated England at home with a 2–0 margin.

Following their performances in the series both Andrew Flintoff and Michael Vaughan were given the Freedom of the City in their home towns of Preston and Sheffield.

On 29 September, the Royal Mail issued a set of stamps commemorating the Ashes victory. The set included two first-class stamps and two worth 68 pence each, the cost of posting a letter to Australia.

In the 2006 New Year Honours, 11 of the 12 playing members of the England team were awarded the MBE, with captain Vaughan awarded the OBE, for their roles in the successful Ashes victory. There was some critical comment that the limited role of some did not warrant the honour.

However, after the following series in which Australia regained the Ashes in a 5–0 whitewash, the English public began to criticise the celebrations of the previous year. This issue also flared up during the Test series when Warne commented on Paul Collingwood's MBE for scoring 17 runs during the 2005 series. Former England captain Geoffrey Boycott criticised the fact that the MBE had been awarded to the whole team when Warne, who had already taken over 600 wickets by then, had not been honoured.
