= 2015 Ashes series =

- Part of Australian cricket team in England and Ireland in 2015
- The Investec Ashes Series 2015 logo
- Date: 8 July – 24 August 2015
- Location: England and Wales
- Result: England won the five-match series 3–2
- Player of the series: Joe Root (Eng) and Chris Rogers (Aus); Compton–Miller Medal: Joe Root (Eng)
Teams
- England: Australia
Captains
- Alastair Cook: Michael Clarke
Most runs
- Joe Root (460) Alastair Cook (330) Moeen Ali (293): Steve Smith (508); Chris Rogers (480); David Warner (418)
Most wickets
- Stuart Broad (21) Steven Finn (12) Moeen Ali (12): Mitchell Starc (18); Josh Hazlewood (16); Nathan Lyon (16)

The 2015 Ashes series (named Investec Ashes Series for sponsorship reasons) was a series of Test cricket matches played between England and Australia for The Ashes. The venues were Sophia Gardens (Cardiff), Lord's (London), Edgbaston (Birmingham), Trent Bridge (Nottingham), and The Oval (London). Australia were the defending holders of the Ashes going into the series, having won in 2013–14.

England won the series 3–2, regaining the Ashes after taking an unassailable lead with an innings victory in the fourth Test. Despite the close 3-2 scoreline, the series did not have the drama and close finishes of the 2005 and 2009 series: all the individual Tests were fairly one-sided, and it was clear after day one of the fourth Test that England would regain the Ashes.

== Rescheduling ==
Starting with this series, the four-year cycle of Ashes series in England was brought forward by two years. Similarly, series in Australia were brought forward one year beginning with the 2013–14 series. This rescheduling was to avoid a clash with the 2015 World Cup, which was hosted by Australia and New Zealand, and future World Cup preparations. England last hosted the Ashes in 2013. However, this rescheduling would cause England to host an Ashes series in 2019 immediately after the 2019 World Cup in England, resulting in a possible hindrance to Australia's Ashes preparations, despite the 2013–14 series being held a year earlier than scheduled to avoid the same outcome with the World Cup. The rescheduling has been criticised in some quarters as owing to greed and commercialism. The ECB have also commented that having three Ashes series in two years will also prevent any future Ashes series held in Australia from affecting World Cup preparations.

== Squads ==
On 31 March 2015, Australia announced a 17-man touring party for the Ashes series. England announced their squad for the first Test on 1 July. Australia fast-bowler Ryan Harris announced his retirement from cricket days before the start of the series, due to an ongoing knee injury. He was subsequently replaced by New South Wales fast bowler Pat Cummins.

Australia	England
Michael Clarke (c); Steve Smith (vc); Pat Cummins^{1}; Fawad Ahmed; Brad Haddin (wk); ~~Ryan Harris~~^{1}; Josh Hazlewood; Mitchell Johnson; Nathan Lyon; Mitchell Marsh; Shaun Marsh; Peter Nevill (wk); Chris Rogers; Peter Siddle; Mitchell Starc; Adam Voges; David Warner; Shane Watson	Alastair Cook (c); Joe Root (vc); James Anderson^{3}; Jonny Bairstow^{2}; Gary Ballance^{2}; Ian Bell; Stuart Broad; Jos Buttler (wk); Steven Finn; Mark Footitt^{3}; Adam Lyth; Moeen Ali; Liam Plunkett^{3}; Adil Rashid; Ben Stokes; Mark Wood

^{1} Cummins replaced Ryan Harris, who retired prior to the start of the series due to a knee injury.
^{2} Bairstow replaced Gary Ballance in the squad from the third Test onwards.
^{3} Plunkett and Footitt replaced James Anderson in the squad for the fourth Test due to Anderson suffering an injury. Anderson returned to the squad in place of Footitt for the fifth Test.

== Matches ==
=== First Test ===
8–12 July (Note: While five days of play were scheduled for each Test, the first, second, and fifth Tests reached a result within four days.)
Scorecard

England	v	Australia
430 (102.1 overs); Joe Root 134 (166); Mitchell Starc 5/114 (24.1 overs)		308 (84.5 overs); Chris Rogers 95 (133); James Anderson 3/43 (18.5 overs)
289 (70.1 overs); Ian Bell 60 (89); Joe Root 60 (89); Nathan Lyon 4/75 (20.1 overs)		242 (70.3 overs); Mitchell Johnson 77 (94); Stuart Broad 3/39 (14 overs)

England won by 169 runs
Sophia Gardens, Cardiff
Umpires: Kumar Dharmasena (SL) and Marais Erasmus (SA)
Player of the match: Joe Root (Eng)

- England won the toss and elected to bat.

Having been asked to field first by England, despite the start being delayed by a prolonged opening ceremony, the Australians made an early breakthrough with the wicket of Adam Lyth (6). The arrival of Gary Ballance saw a mini-partnership develop between him and captain Alastair Cook, before Cook (20) edged a ball from spinner Nathan Lyon to wicket-keeper Brad Haddin, followed almost immediately by Ian Bell (1), trapped LBW by Mitchell Starc. That brought Joe Root to the crease to join his Yorkshire teammate Ballance. In what was undoubtedly the turning point in the match, Haddin dropped a fairly regulation catch from the bowling of Starc on Root's second delivery. The dismissal would have reduced England to 43/4 after they chose to bat first, but after the let off the pair raced to their respective fifties, putting on 153 runs for the fourth wicket before Ballance was trapped LBW by Josh Hazlewood for 61. Root and Ben Stokes then shared a fifth-wicket stand of 84 before Root was caught out by Shane Watson off Starc for a total of 134, having rescued England from 43/3 to 280/5. Stokes completed his half-century before he was bowled by Starc for 52, and Jos Buttler was also out for 27 after a seventh-wicket stand of exactly 50 with Moeen Ali, but England managed to see out the day on 343/7.

Having been 26 not out overnight, Moeen Ali added another 51 runs on the morning of the second day before he was caught out by Watson off Starc. Stuart Broad's 18 was the only significant contribution to the England total among the tail, and Starc completed a five-wicket haul when he bowled James Anderson to end the England innings on 430. Australia made a steady start to their response, putting on 52 runs before David Warner was caught by Cook in the slips for 17. Next to go for Australia was Steve Smith, recently ranked as the best Test batsman in the world, caught at short mid-on by Cook off the bowling of Moeen Ali for 33. Meanwhile, Chris Rogers reached 95 before edging a ball from Mark Wood through to Buttler to become the first player to record seven consecutive Test fifties without converting one to a century; it was also Wood's maiden Ashes wicket. A second wicket for Moeen Ali soon followed, as he caught Australia captain Michael Clarke off his own bowling. A 50-run partnership between Adam Voges and Shane Watson for the fifth wicket was ended shortly before the end of the day, with Voges caught by Anderson off Stokes for 31, leaving Australia on 264/5 at the close of play.

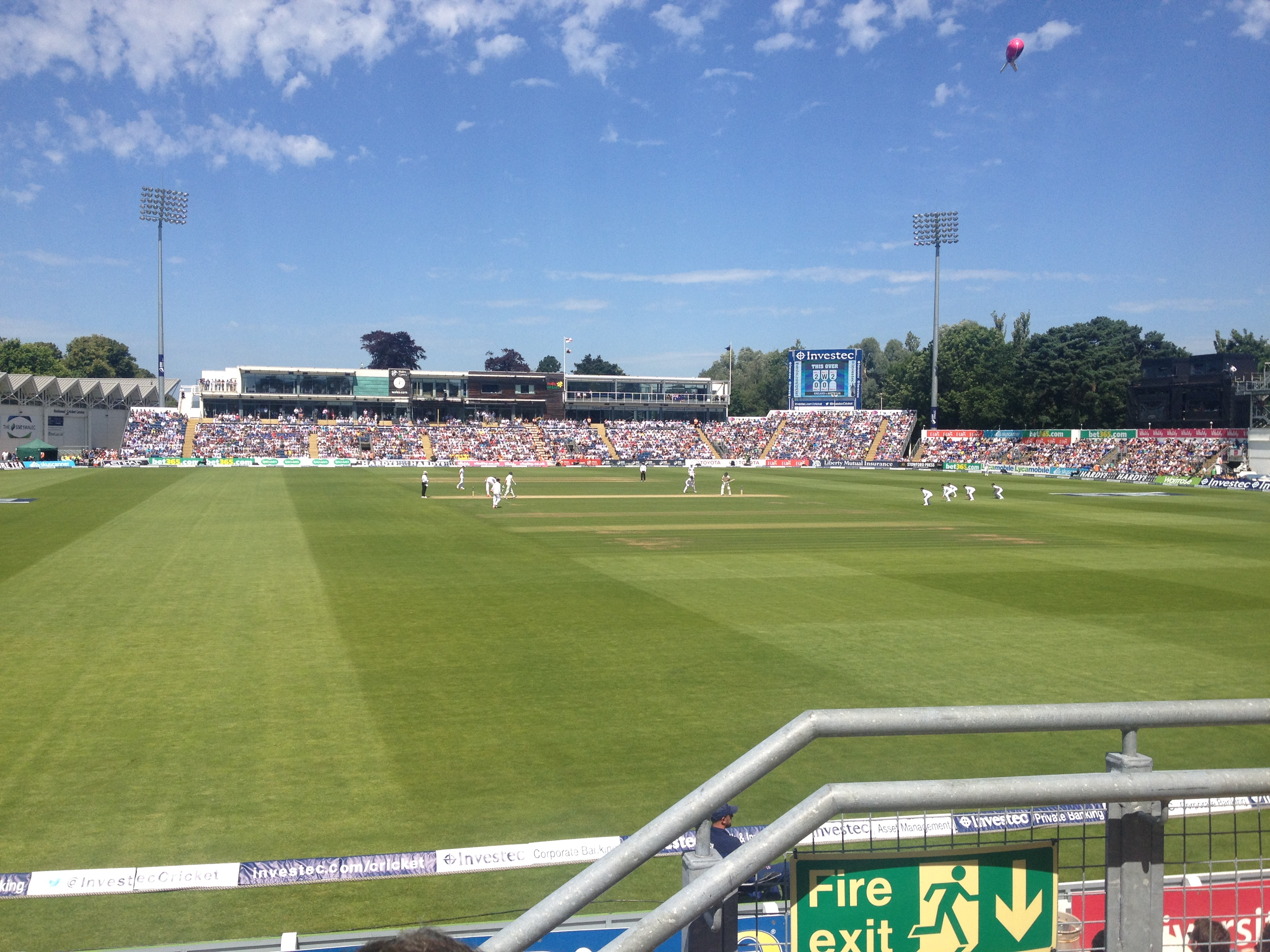
Australia batting on the morning of the third day

The third morning started with two quick wickets, with Watson and nightwatchman Lyon departing for the addition of just one run. A flurry of runs from Haddin and Mitchell Johnson saw Australia pass 300, but the last two wickets fell for just four runs, and Australia were all out for 308, still 122 runs behind England. As England began their second innings, the Australians again made early breakthroughs, with Cook out for 12 and Ballance out for a duck, before Lyth and Bell shared a stand of 51 runs for the third wicket. The partnership was broken when Clarke made a one-handed catch to dismiss Lyth for 37, but Bell batted on to reach his first Test half-century in 10 innings. He and Root put on 97 for the fourth wicket before Bell was out for 60, bowled by Johnson for the Australian's first wicket of the match, following first-innings figures of 0/111. Root followed 11 overs later for exactly the same score off exactly the same number of balls, and dismissed in exactly the same manner by Hazlewood. Stokes then made a useful 42, but after the dismissal of Buttler (7), there was a clatter of wickets, reducing England from 236/5 to 245/8 in less than three overs. Wood hit a quickfire 32 not out off 18 balls to push England towards 300, but they were eventually bowled out for 289, a lead of 411. With rain forecast for the fifth day, England knew that they would have to bowl Australia out on day 4 to ensure victory.

With Australia chasing 412 to win, they lost Rogers for 10 early on, ending his record-equalling run of half-centuries, but a 78-run partnership between Warner and Smith looked to have stabilised the innings. The stand was broken by Moeen Ali in the final over before lunch, trapping Warner LBW for 52. Australia then lost Smith (33), Clarke (4) and Voges (1) in the five overs following the interval; in the space of six overs, they had fallen from 97/1 to 106/5. Haddin was next to go, caught at short midwicket by Cook for 7; the England captain parried the ball up at the first attempt, but retained his focus to cling on at the second time of asking. Watson (19) did his best to reignite the innings before being trapped LBW for the second time in the match, reducing Australia to 151/7. Johnson and Starc then shared a 72-run partnership for the eighth wicket, only for Root's off spin to find both their edges to leave the tourists 169 behind with one wicket in hand. Root was again involved in the final wicket, as Moeen Ali tempted Hazlewood into a big shot down the ground to long on, where Root was waiting to take the catch and seal victory. For his contributions primarily with the bat, but also with the ball, Root was named Man of the Match.

=== Second Test ===
16–20 July
Scorecard

Australia	v	England
566/8d (149 overs); Steve Smith 215 (346); Stuart Broad 4/83 (27 overs)		312 (90.1 overs); Alastair Cook 96 (233); Mitchell Johnson 3/53 (20.1 overs)
254/2d (49 overs); David Warner 83 (116); Moeen Ali 2/78 (16 overs)		103 (37 overs); Stuart Broad 25 (17); Mitchell Johnson 3/27 (10 overs)

Australia won by 405 runs
Lord's, London
Umpires: Kumar Dharmasena (SL) and Marais Erasmus (SA)
Player of the match: Steve Smith (Aus)

- Australia won the toss and elected to bat.
- Peter Nevill (Aus) made his Test debut, and took seven dismissals (all catches), which was a record for a wicket-keeper on Ashes debut.
- It was the first time since 2009 in which Australia won a test match in England.

Australia won the toss and opted to bat first. After losing David Warner for 38, the duo of Chris Rogers and Steve Smith batted out the rest of day one and both scored hundreds in the process. Australia finished on 337/1 at stumps with Rogers on 158 and Smith on 129.

Stuart Broad ended the 284-run partnership by dismissing Rogers for 173 in the sixth over of the second day. Smith continued to amass runs even as wickets fell at the other end. A few overs before tea, Smith was dismissed leg before wicket for 215 by Joe Root. After a brisk 45 by debutant Peter Nevill, Australia decided to declare when their score was on 566/8. In reply, England were reduced to 30/4 as Australian fast bowlers delivered early breakthroughs. England captain Alastair Cook then stabilised the innings with Ben Stokes and took the score to 85/4 at the close of day's play.

Cook and Stokes continued to rebuild for England on the third day, but the wicket of Stokes just before lunch dented England's progress. Apart from a knock of 39 by Moeen Ali, Cook got little support from the remaining batsmen and was dismissed four runs short of a hundred. England were eventually bowled out for 312 after tea. Instead of enforcing the follow on, Australia decided to bat their second innings. Both their openers started to score rapidly and took the team score to 108 without loss at stumps.

Rogers was retired hurt for 49 early during the morning session of the fourth day but that did not halt the Australian onslaught. Australia batsmen continued to pile on quick runs as they attacked the England bowlers, increasing the lead. Warner was dismissed for 83, before an aggressive 48-ball 58 from Smith and quickfire cameos from Clarke and Mitchell Marsh had taken the visitors' total to 254/2 in just 49 overs when Clarke decided to declare. Being set an improbable target of 509 runs to be scored in five sessions, England started poorly with none of the top-order batsmen reaching 15. England were eventually bowled out in just 37 overs for 103. Australia thus leveled the series 1–1 with a 405-run victory and Smith was named player of the match.

=== Third Test ===
29 July – 2 August (Note: While five days of play were scheduled for each Test, the third and fourth Tests reached a result within three days.)
Scorecard

Australia	v	England
136 (36.4 overs); Chris Rogers 52 (89); James Anderson 6/47 (14.4 overs)		281 (67.1 overs); Joe Root 63 (75); Nathan Lyon 3/36 (13 overs)
265 (79.1 overs); David Warner 77 (62); Steven Finn 6/79 (21 overs)		124/2 (32.1 overs); Ian Bell 65* (90); Josh Hazlewood 1/21 (7 overs)

England won by 8 wickets
Edgbaston, Birmingham
Umpires: Aleem Dar (Pak) and Chris Gaffaney (NZ)
Player of the match: Steven Finn (Eng)

- Australia won the toss and elected to bat.
- Play on Day 1 was reduced to 66 overs due to rain.
- Mitchell Johnson became the second Australian player (after Shane Warne) to reach 300 wickets and 2,000 Test runs.

Steven Finn came into the England team in place of Mark Wood. Australia won the toss and chose to bat first with an unchanged team. Australia were 72/3 at lunch before England fast bowlers took quick wickets in the second session to bowl Australia out for 136. James Anderson claimed six wickets, while Broad and Finn took two each. In reply, England rode on fifties from Ian Bell and Joe Root to finish the day at a solid position of 133/3, despite losing the wicket of Bell towards the end.

Australia made inroads on the second morning and reduced England to 190/7. An eighth-wicket stand of 87 runs between Moeen Ali and Broad gave England a healthy lead before Australia came back to dismiss the tail and end the innings at 281, a lead of 145 for England. In Australia's second innings, a devastating spell from Finn reduced Australia from 62/1 to 92/5, with five of the top six batsmen being dismissed for single-digit scores. David Warner counter-attacked for Australia with a 62-ball 77. Australia finished the second day on 168/7, only 23 runs ahead, with Finn having five wickets to his name and England in a very strong position. But during the day Anderson had to leave the match due to side strain and would not return.

On the morning of the third day, battling fifties from Peter Nevill and Mitchell Starc extended Australia's slender lead. England bowlers then came back to end the Australian innings at 265. Finn ended with career-best figures of 6/79. Chasing the target of 121 to win, England lost both openers cheaply, but unbeaten knocks of 65 from Bell and 38 from Root guided England to a comfortable victory by eight wickets, and a 2–1 series lead. Finn was awarded man of the match.

=== Fourth Test ===
6–10 August
Scorecard

Australia	v	England
60 (18.3 overs); Mitchell Johnson 13 (25); Stuart Broad 8/15 (9.3 overs)		391/9d (85.2 overs); Joe Root 130 (176); Mitchell Starc 6/111 (27 overs)
253 (72.4 overs); David Warner 64 (74); Ben Stokes 6/36 (21 overs)

England won by an innings and 78 runs
Trent Bridge, Nottingham
Umpires: Aleem Dar (Pak) and S. Ravi (Ind)
Player of the match: Stuart Broad (Eng)

- England won the toss and elected to field.
- Play on Day 1 was delayed until 11:05 due to rain.
- Play on Day 2 was called off early at 18:27 due to bad light.
- Australia's score of 60 in the first innings from 18.3 overs (or 111 balls, and taking just 93 minutes) is the quickest – in terms of balls faced – a team has been bowled out in the first innings of a Test match. Australia scored more runs from extras (14) than their highest-scoring batsman (Mitchell Johnson with 13). This was the first time that extras had outscored a team's top-scoring batsman in Ashes history.
- Stuart Broad became the fifth English bowler to take 300 Test wickets, and second English player (after Ian Botham) to reach 300 wickets and 2,000 Test runs, matching the feat of Mitchell Johnson in the previous Test. His figures of 8/15 are the third-best for any England bowler in an Ashes Test, and his five wickets in 19 balls were the fastest five wickets for a Test opening bowler and joint fastest for any Test bowler (joint with Ernie Toshack of Australia vs. India in 1947). With a wicket in the second innings, Broad overtook Fred Trueman for fourth in all-time English Test wicket-takers with 308.
- Between the third and fourth Tests, in consecutive innings, four different English bowlers (Anderson, Finn, Broad, and Stokes) each took at least six wickets. This is a first for Test cricket.
- England regained the Ashes.

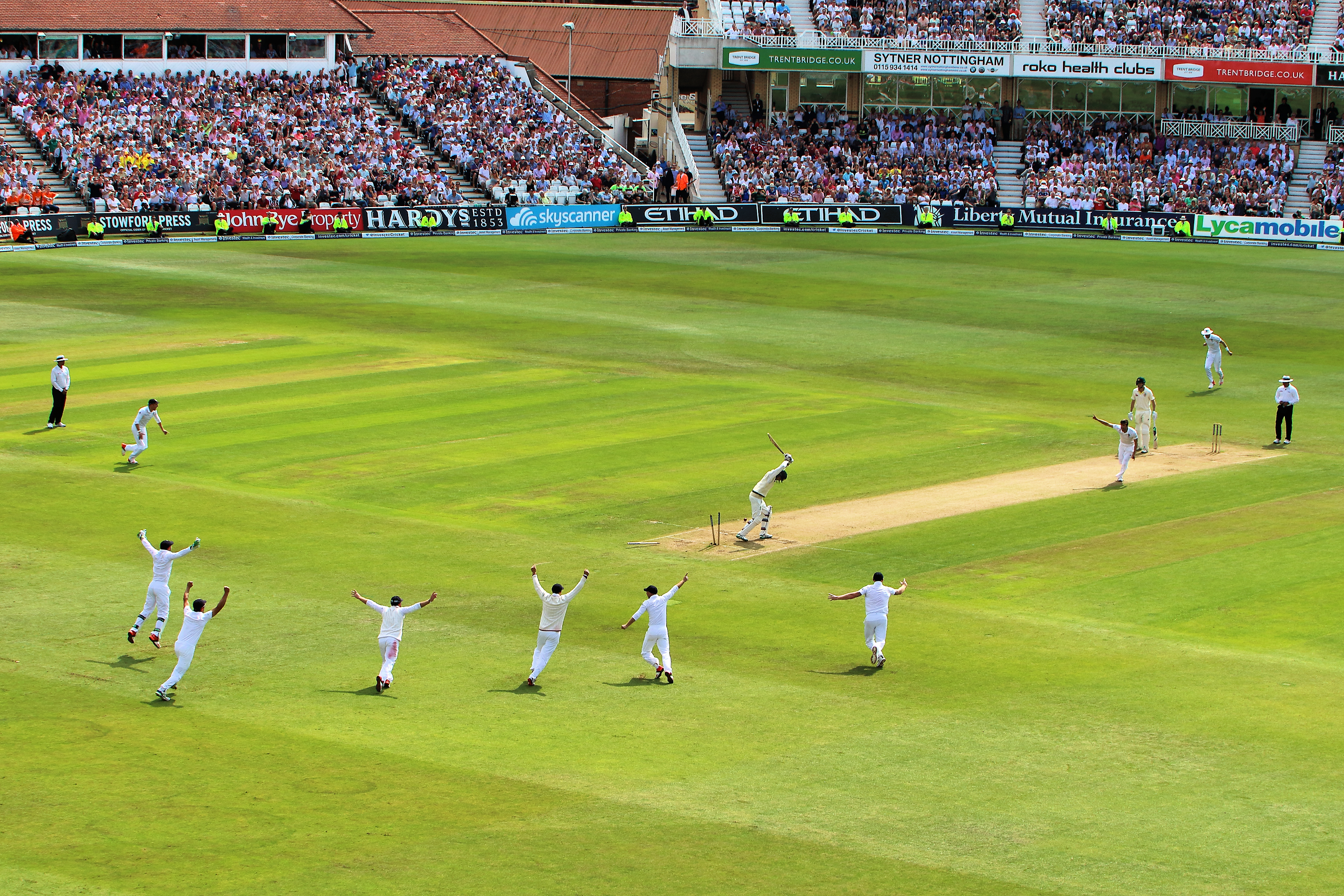
The final wicket of the Fourth Test match

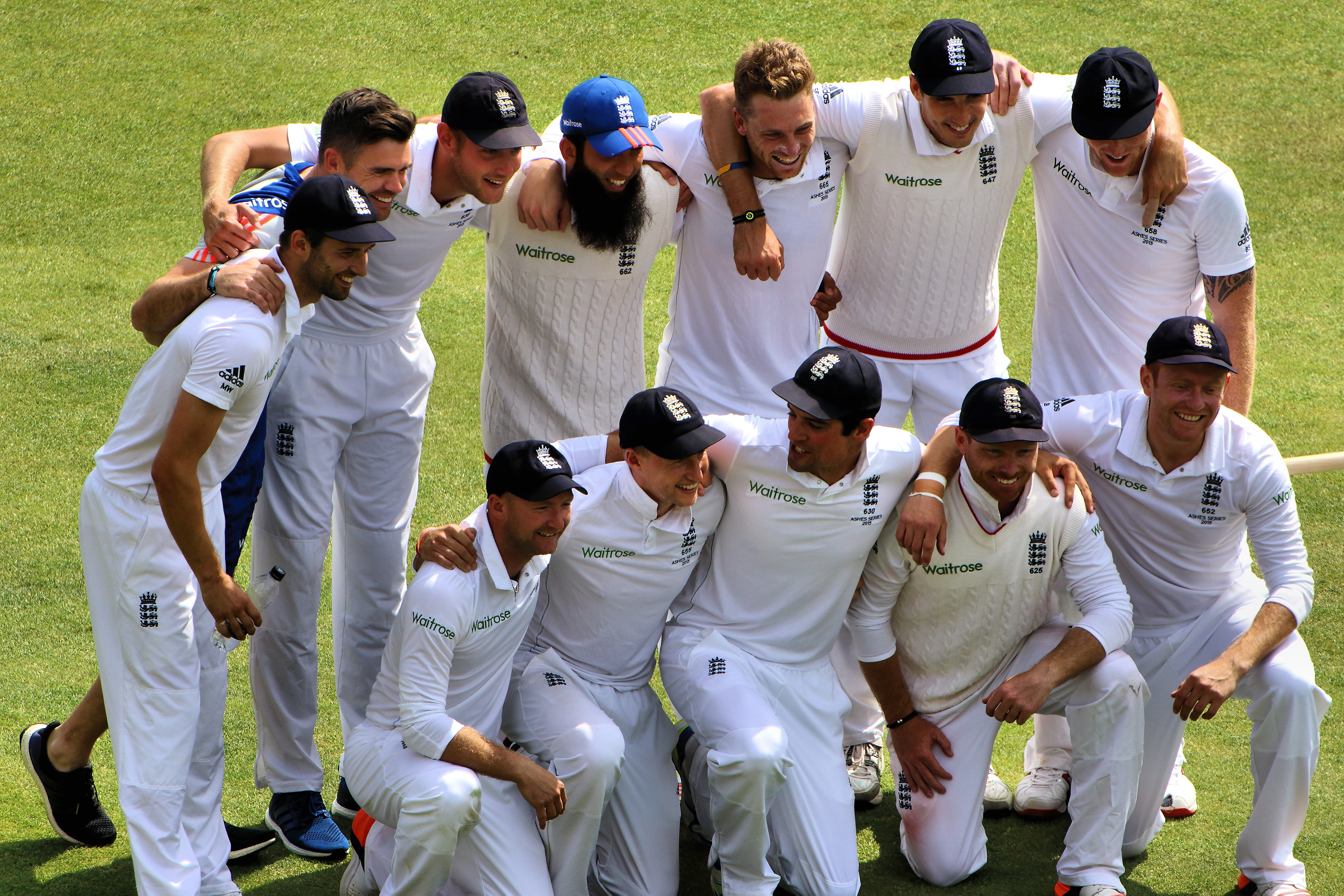
The England team after regaining the Ashes

England won the toss and elected to bowl first. England made one change to their team, replacing the injured James Anderson with Mark Wood, while Shaun Marsh replaced his brother Mitchell in the Australian side. Australia were bowled out before lunch on the first day for 60 in 18.3 overs, the fewest overs a team has been bowled out for in the first innings of a Test match. Stuart Broad picked up 8/15, the best bowling figures by a fast bowler in an Ashes Test, while extras outscored every one of Australia's batsmen with 14 (the top-scoring batsman was tail-ender Mitchell Johnson, with 13). In England's first innings, after Mitchell Starc took three early wickets, Joe Root and Jonny Bairstow put up 173 runs for the fourth wicket. Bairstow was dismissed towards the end of first day and England were 274/4 at stumps.

Starc dismissed Root for 130 and took two more wickets on the morning of the second day, but a quickfire lower-order partnership between Moeen Ali and Broad pushed England's total higher. England decided to declare at the brink of lunch when their total had reached 391/9. Australia's second innings began with a 113-run opening stand between Warner and Rogers. Ben Stokes took the first three Australian wickets and triggered a collapse. Adam Voges showed some resistance while wickets fell at the other end, taking Australia to 241/7 at the close of the day's play.

England took just 10.2 overs on the third day to claim the remaining three Australian wickets. Australia were bowled out for 253, giving England a victory by an innings and 78 runs. Stokes had figures of 6/36 in the second innings and Broad was named man of the match. England regained the Ashes with a match to spare in the series, and Ian Bell became the first England player since Ian Botham to win five Ashes series. At the conclusion of the match, Australian captain Michael Clarke announced he would retire from international cricket after the series.

=== Fifth Test ===
20–24 August
Scorecard

Australia	v	England
481 (125.1 overs); Steve Smith 143 (252); Steven Finn 3/90 (29.1 overs)		149 (48.4 overs); Moeen Ali 30 (61); Mitchell Johnson 3/21 (8.4 overs)
		286 (101.4 overs) (f/o); Alastair Cook 85 (234); Peter Siddle 4/35 (24.4 overs)

Australia won by an innings and 46 runs
The Oval, London
Umpires: Aleem Dar (Pak) and Kumar Dharmasena (SL)
Player of the match: Steve Smith (Aus)

- England won the toss and elected to field.
- Play on Day 1 was delayed from 17:25 until 17:50 due to rain.
- Play on Day 4 was delayed from 12:16 until 14:55 due to rain.

James Anderson was not passed fit for the fifth Test, so England named an unchanged side, denying Adil Rashid his home Test debut. For Australia, Josh Hazlewood was ruled out with an ankle injury, paving the way for Peter Siddle to make a long-awaited return to Test cricket ahead of Pat Cummins, despite media reports to the contrary before the match. Mitchell Marsh was recalled ahead of his brother Shaun, while Brad Haddin was not recalled for his possible final Test match.

Australia dominated the match right from the start with a century opening partnership between Warner and Rogers. Steven Smith scored his 11th test century as Australia finished their innings at 481. England's reply was lacking with them ending day 2 at 107/8. England, after being bowled out for 149 in their first innings, were asked to follow on. However, by the end of the third day an innings defeat was looming with England on 203/6 and still trailing by 129 runs. With the threat of rain washing out several sessions of the last two days, Australia started day 4 brightly and took two early wickets before rain brought an early lunch. After a lengthy lunch break, Siddle took the last two wickets to bring an end to an eventful series. This match marked the end of the international careers of both Michael Clarke and Chris Rogers.

== Statistics ==
As of fifth Test ending 24 August 2015

=== Leading run-scorers ===
Rank	Name	Runs	Inns.	NO	HS	Ave.	100s	50s	SR
1	(Australia) Steve Smith	508	9	0	215	56.44	2	1	62.87
2	(Australia) Chris Rogers	480	9	1	173	60.00	1	3	58.11
3	(England) Joe Root	460	9	1	134	57.50	2	2	67.05
4	(Australia) David Warner	418	9	0	85	46.44	0	5	74.50
5	(England) Alastair Cook	330	9	0	96	36.66	0	2	45.08
Source: ESPNcricinfo

=== Leading wicket-takers ===
Rank	Name	Wkts.	Ovs.	Mdns.	Runs	Eco.	Ave.	Best.
1	(England) Stuart Broad	21	143.3	34	439	3.05	20.90	9/51
2	(Australia) Mitchell Starc	18	142.2	23	549	3.85	30.50	7/174
3	(Australia) Josh Hazlewood	16	112.0	18	412	3.67	25.75	5/88
4	(Australia) Nathan Lyon	16	137.1	25	452	3.29	28.25	6/144
5	(Australia) Mitchell Johnson	15	140.1	29	524	3.73	34.93	6/80
Source: ESPNcricinfo

== Aftermath ==
The Ashes trophy was presented to England immediately after their defeat in the fifth Test. This was criticised by The Guardian's Mike Selvey, who called the ceremony "perhaps the most incongruous champagne shower in history". Joe Root was awarded the Compton–Miller Medal for player of the series.

Australian players Michael Clarke, Chris Rogers, Shane Watson and Brad Haddin retired from Test cricket at the end of the series. England moved up to third in the ICC Test Championship (from sixth at the start of the series), but remained behind Australia who stayed in second place.

Cricket journalists gave a mixed opinion on the quality of the series, praising several good spells of bowling but criticising the poor standard of batting, which was seen as too aggressive and impatient for Test cricket. There was also disappointment that none of the matches lasted the full five days, with the result often obvious early on. Vic Marks said "by the end of the second day of each match we always knew who was going to win; sometimes that was obvious by the end of the first day; at Nottingham by the first interval".
