= List of Northumberland County Cricket Club List A players =

Northumberland County Cricket Club played 18 List A cricket matches between 1971 and 2005. This is a list of the players who appeared in those matches that were played. A further List A match was abandoned without a ball being bowled.

- Timothy Adcock, 1 match, 1994
- Michael Anderson, 1 match, 1984
- Graeme Angus, 7 matches, 1994–2002
- Peter Atkinson, 1 match, 1971
- Jonathon Benn, 1 match, 1992
- David Borthwick, 1 match, 1994
- Alan Brown, 3 matches, 1971–1977
- Alexander Brown, 1 match, 2003
- Paul Burn, 1 match, 1992
- Ian Callen, 2 matches, 1977
- Steven Chapman, 4 matches, 2001–2003
- Ian Conn, 2 matches, 1992–1994
- Kevin Corby, 4 matches, 1984–1989
- Paul Cormack, 3 matches, 1986–1989
- Mike Crawhall, 3 matches, 1971–1977
- Lee Crozier, 8 matches, 1999–2005
- Adrian Dalby, 1 match, 1989
- Richard Dreyer, 2 matches, 1986–1987
- Paul Dutton, 4 matches, 1987–1994
- Wayne Falla, 5 matches, 1992–2000
- Stephen Foster, 3 matches, 2000
- Stu Gillespie, 1 match, 1987
- John Graham, 4 matches, 2001–2005
- Norman Graham, 1 match, 1984
- Peter Graham, 5 matches, 1986–1994
- Stephen Greensword, 3 matches, 1977–1992
- Graeme Hallam, 6 matches, 1999–2003
- Gordon Halliday, 2 matches, 1984–1986
- Adam Heather, 5 matches, 1999–2005
- Harry Henderson, 1 match, 1971
- Christopher Hewison, 2 matches, 2002–2003
- Stephen Humble, 1 match, 2005
- Peter Ingham, 1 match, 1984
- Alec Johnson, 3 matches, 1971–1977
- Peter Kippax, 2 matches, 1977
- Mike Latham, 1 match, 1971
- Stephen Lishman, 1 match, 1984
- James Miller, 1 match, 2001
- Graeme Morris, 3 matches, 1986–1994
- Shahid Nazir, 3 matches, 2002–2003
- Philip Nicholson, 8 matches, 1999–2005
- Ken Norton, 3 matches, 1971–1977
- Simon O'Donnell, 1 match, 1989
- Chris Old, 2 matches, 1986–1987
- Bradley Parker, 7 matches, 2000–2005
- Kenneth Pearson, 6 matches, 1977–1989
- Paul Pickworth, 1 match, 1984
- Martin Pollard, 3 matches, 2001–2005
- Ian Pont, 1 match, 1989
- Iain Purdy, 1 match, 2003
- Jim Purvis, 2 matches, 1987–1989
- Wayne Ritzema, 1 match, 2003
- William Robson, 2 matches, 1977
- David Rutherford, 7 matches, 1999–2003
- Paul Scott, 2 matches, 1986–1987
- Rick Sellers, 1 match, 2001
- Imran Shah, 2 matches, 1999–2003
- Daniel Shurben, 1 match, 2005
- Martin Speight, 2 matches, 2002–2003
- Craig Stanley, 3 matches, 1994–2000
- Barry Stewart, 1 match, 2000
- Tim Stonock, 1 match, 2003
- Raymond Swann, 1 match, 1971
- Marc Symington, 2 matches, 2003–2005
- Joe Thewlis, 2 matches, 1971–1977
- Michael Thewlis, 1 match, 1994
- Matthew Thompson, 1 match, 1999
- Stuart Tiffin, 2 matches, 1989–1992
- Henry Twizell, 1 match, 1984
- Jack van Geloven, 1 match, 1971
- Peter Willey, 1 match, 1992
- Kelvin Williams, 3 matches, 1984–1992
- John Windows, 9 matches, 1999–2005
- John Woodford, 1 match, 1977
- Allan Worthy, 1 match, 2005
- Michael Youll, 3 matches, 1971–1977
- Oliver Youll, 2 matches, 1994–1999
- Mike Younger, 5 matches, 1984–1994
