= Pickworth =

Pickworth may refer to:

- Pickworth (surname)
- Pickworth, Lincolnshire, England
- Pickworth, Rutland, England
