= Henry Pickworth =

English religious controversialist

Henry Pickworth (c.1673?–c.1738) was an English religious controversialist, from about 1702 hostile to the Quakers.

== Life ==
The son of Henry Pickworth, a farmer of New Sleaford, Lincolnshire, he was born there about 1673, and was in business in Sleaford as a tanner. After joining the Quakers, he was appointed an elder and overseer by the Waddington monthly meeting. Hearing that Francis Bugg proposed coming, at the instigation of the bishop, to confute the Quakers in Lincolnshire, Pickworth sent him a challenge to visit Sleaford, and hold with him an open dispute. Bugg arrived 11 August 1701, and on 25 August the conference was held in the sessions house, before justices and clergymen. Pickworth was thought to have performed disappointingly, and Bugg was given a certificate, dated 11 March 1702, that he had made good his charges. Two Quaker books were publicly burned in the market-place. Both disputants issued their own version of the conference, and Pickworth then attacked Bugg in pamphlets.

Pickworth was soon after completely won over to Bugg's views, and began writing against the Quakers. He went repeatedly to the yearly Quaker meeting held in London in May and June, to present addresses, protests, and "testimonies", but was generally refused an audience. At last, on 9 June 1714, he was disowned by the quarterly meeting of Lincoln for supporting the Camisards. Pickworth vainly petitioned the Lords and Commons for another public conference. He moved to Lynn Regis, Norfolk, before 1738, when he issued a defence of his indictment against the Quakers. He died at Lynn some time after that date.

== Works ==
Among other pamphlets, Pickworth issued A Charge of Error, Heresy, Incharity, Falshood, Evasion, Inconsistency, Innovation, Imposition, Infidelity, Hypocrisy, Pride, Raillery, Apostasy, Perjury, Idolatry, Villainy, Blasphemy, Abomination, Confusion, and worse than Turkish Tyranny. Most justly exhibited, and offered to be proved against the most noted Leaders, &c., of the People called Quakers, London, 1716. Pickworth sought to show that all Quakers were papists, and that William Penn died insane. His book provoked replies from Joseph Besse and Richard Claridge. In his writings the influence of Thomas Crisp, George Keith and Charles Leslie is seen, as well as Bugg's arguments.

In 1730 Pickworth sent another expostulatory letter to the yearly Quaker meeting, which he printed on their refusal to read it.

== Family ==
He married, on 28 March 1696, Winifred, daughter of John Whitchurch (died 1680) of Warwick Lane, London, by whom he had five sons, all born at Sleaford. His widow remained a Quaker minister until her death at Lynn, 1 May 1752.

== Notes ==
Attribution

This article incorporates text from a publication now in the public domain: Lee, Sidney, ed. (1896). "Pickworth, Henry". Dictionary of National Biography. Vol. 45. London: Smith, Elder & Co.
