= Docwra =

Docwra, also with spelling Dockwra, Dockwray, Dockray and other variants, is an English language surname, of Norse-Viking origin, which was significant in London and East Anglia in the 17th century. It may refer to:

- Anne Docwra (1624–1710), English Quaker minister, religious writer and philanthropist
- Edmund Docwra (fl.1571–2), English politician, father of Henry, 1st Baron Docwra
- Graham Dockray (born 1946), British physiologist
- Henry Docwra, 1st Baron Docwra (1564–1631), English-born soldier and statesman in Ireland
- Mary Dockray-Miller (born 1965), American medievalist
- Thomas Docwra (1458?–1527), Grand Prior of the English Knights Hospitaller
- Tracy Dockray (born 1962), American artist
- William Dockwra (c.1635–1716), English merchant
