= Lishman =

Lishman is a surname. Notable people with this surname include:

- Ollie Lishman (1998-Present), Australian Music Producer and DJ
- Bill Lishman (1939–2017), Canadian inventor and artist
- Doug Lishman (1923–1994), English footballer
- George Lishman (1885–1940), South African sports shooter
- Gordon Lishman (born 1947), British activist
- John Lishman Potter (1834–1931), English goldminer and stonemason
- Joyce Lishman (1947–2021), English academic
- Stephen Lishman (born 1960), English cricketer
- Suzy Lishman (born 1967/68), British pathologist
- William Alwyn Lishman (1931–2021), British psychiatrist and neurologist
