= Glenn Querl =

Zimbabwean cricketer (born 1988)

Personal information
- Full name: Reginald Glenn Querl
- Born: 4 April 1988 (age 38); Harare, Zimbabwe
- Batting: Right-handed
- Bowling: Right-arm medium-fast

Domestic team information
- Years: Team
- 2010–2013: Unicorns (squad no. 19)
- 2011/12–2012/13: Matabeleland Tuskers
- 2013: Hampshire (squad no. 88)

Career statistics
| Competition | FC | LA | T20 |
|---|---|---|---|
| Matches | 15 | 48 | 13 |
| Runs scored | 490 | 454 | 41 |
| Batting average | 49.00 | 18.91 | 8.20 |
| 100s/50s | 1/1 | 0/0 | 0/0 |
| Top score | 188* | 44 | 16 |
| Balls bowled | 3,473 | 2,090 | 272 |
| Wickets | 83 | 61 | 16 |
| Bowling average | 14.95 | 29.40 | 19.50 |
| 5 wickets in innings | 8 | 1 | 0 |
| 10 wickets in match | 0 | 0 | 0 |
| Best bowling | 6/20 | 5/26 | 3/13 |
| Catches/stumpings | 5/– | 9/– | 3/– |
- Source: Cricinfo, 4 June 2013

Reginald Glenn Querl (born 4 April 1988) is a Zimbabwean cricket coach and former cricketer who played first-class cricket in England for Hampshire and in Zimbabwe for the Matabeleland Tuskers. He is the current Women's Performance and Pathway Coach and Assistant Coach to the Ireland women's cricket team.

== Playing career ==
Querl was born in Harare in April 1988. His talents as a cricketer were first spotted when he was at primary school in Zimbabwe, with Querl later representing the Zimbabwe Under-19 cricket team in the Afro-Asia Under-19 Cup in November 2005 and the 2006 Under-19 Cricket World Cup, with him making five appearances in the latter tournament. He came to England in 2006 to study at Harrow School. There he came to the attention of Essex in 2007, who offered him a trial. Although he was not offered a contract by Essex, Querl joined the Marylebone Cricket Club's Young Cricketers programme in 2009, despite concerns over the legality of his bowling action. He was amongst the first intake of players for the Unicorns team which was formed to take part in the 2010 Clydesdale Bank 40. Querl made his debut in List A one-day cricket for the Unicorns against Sussex at Hove, and would make ten further appearances during the competition. He ended the tournament as the Unicorns leading bowler, having taken 14 wickets with his right-arm medium-fast bowling. He returned to play for the Unicorns in the 2011 Clydesdale Bank 40, making twelve appearances in the competition. His was once again the Unicorns leading wicket-taker during the competition, with 13 wickets.

Following the 2011 English season, Querl returned to Zimbabwe to play for the Matabeleland Tuskers. He made his first-class debut against the Southern Rocks in the 2011–12 Logan Cup at Masvingo, starring on debut with a match haul of 9 for 101, which included figures of 6 for 38 in the Southern Rocks first innings. In the match that followed, he took figures of 6 for 20 against Mashonaland Eagles, with Querl taking match figures of 9 for 38. He took his third successive five wicket haul (5 for 132) in his third match against the Mid West Rhinos, with another (5 for 29) against the Mountaineers in his fourth match. He ended the tournament as its leading wicket-taker, with 45 at an average of 12.86. Querl made his debut in Twenty20 cricket for the Tuskers against Kenya, before taking part in the 2011–12 Stanbic Bank 20 Series, during which he made six appearances. He also played one-day cricket for the Tuskers during the 2011–12 season, making four appearances.

Querl returned to England in 2012 to play for the Unicorns in the 2012 Clydesdale Bank 40, making ten appearances. He once again finished the tournament as the Unicorns leading wicket-taker, with 12 wickets. Following the English season, he returned to Zimbabwe to play for the Tuskers where he enjoyed further success across all three formats. He made seven first-class appearances in the 2012-13 Logan Cup, having success with both bat and ball. He scored 413 runs at an average of 82.60, which included a century (188 not out) against the Southern Rocks. With the ball, he took 37 wickets at an average of 16.62, with three further five wicket hauls. Alongside his appearances in the Logan Cup, Querl also made eight appearances in the 2012–13 one-day tournament, taking 14 wickets and claiming his only one-day five wicket haul (5 for 26) against the Mid West Rhinos. He also made six appearances in the 2012–13 Stanbic Bank 20 Series.

Querl made three appearances for the Unicorns in the 2013 Clydesdale Bank 40, and was taken on trial at Hampshire during the 2013 season, making a single appearance for the county in a first-class match against Loughborough MCCU at the Nursery Ground, adjacent to Hampshire's Rose Bowl home ground. He was suspended from bowling by the England and Wales Cricket Board in May 2013, following concerns over the legality of his bowling action; he had previously been called for throwing by Russell Tiffin while playing for the Tuskers in January 2013. He was subsequently cleared to bowl again in August 2013, after investigations found his action to be legal. Despite this, he would not play at a senior level again. During his brief career, Querl took 83 first-class wickets at an average of 14.95, alongside 61 wickets at an average of 29.40 in one-day cricket. He had most success as a batsman in first-class cricket, scoring 490 runs at an average of exactly 49.

== Coaching career ==
After retiring from playing, Querl coached for men's and women's cricket in England. He was appointed head coach of the Scorchers women's cricket team in Ireland in 2020, leading them to back-to-back titles in both the 50 and 20–over competitions in the Women's Super Series. The following year he was appointed Women's Performance and Pathway Coach by Cricket Ireland, supporting Ed Joyce in his role as head coach of the Ireland women's cricket team. He coached the Ireland women's under-19 team during the 2023 Under-19 Women's T20 World Cup in South Africa. In August 2023, he deputised for Joyce during Ireland women's tour of the Netherlands. He later coached the Under-19 Women during the 2025 Under-19 Women's T20 World Cup in Malaysia, in which the Under-19s reached the Super 6 stage.
