= David Borthwick =

David Borthwick may refer to:

- David Borthwick, Lord Lochill (died 1581), Scottish lawyer
- David Borthwick (shinty player) (born 1962), Scottish shinty player
- David Borthwick (cricketer) (born 1963), former English cricketer
- David Borthwick (public servant) (born 1950), former departmental secretary for the Australian Government environment department (between 2004 and 2009)
