= Pickworth (surname) =

Pickworth is a surname. Notable people with the surname include:

- Brian Pickworth (1929–2020), New Zealand fencer
- Henry Pickworth (c.1673?–c.1738), English religious controversialist
- Ossie Pickworth (1918–1969), Australian golfer
- Paul Pickworth (born 1958), English cricketer
- Samuel Pickworth Woodward (1821–1865), English geologist and malacologist
