= Scott Borthwick =

English cricketer

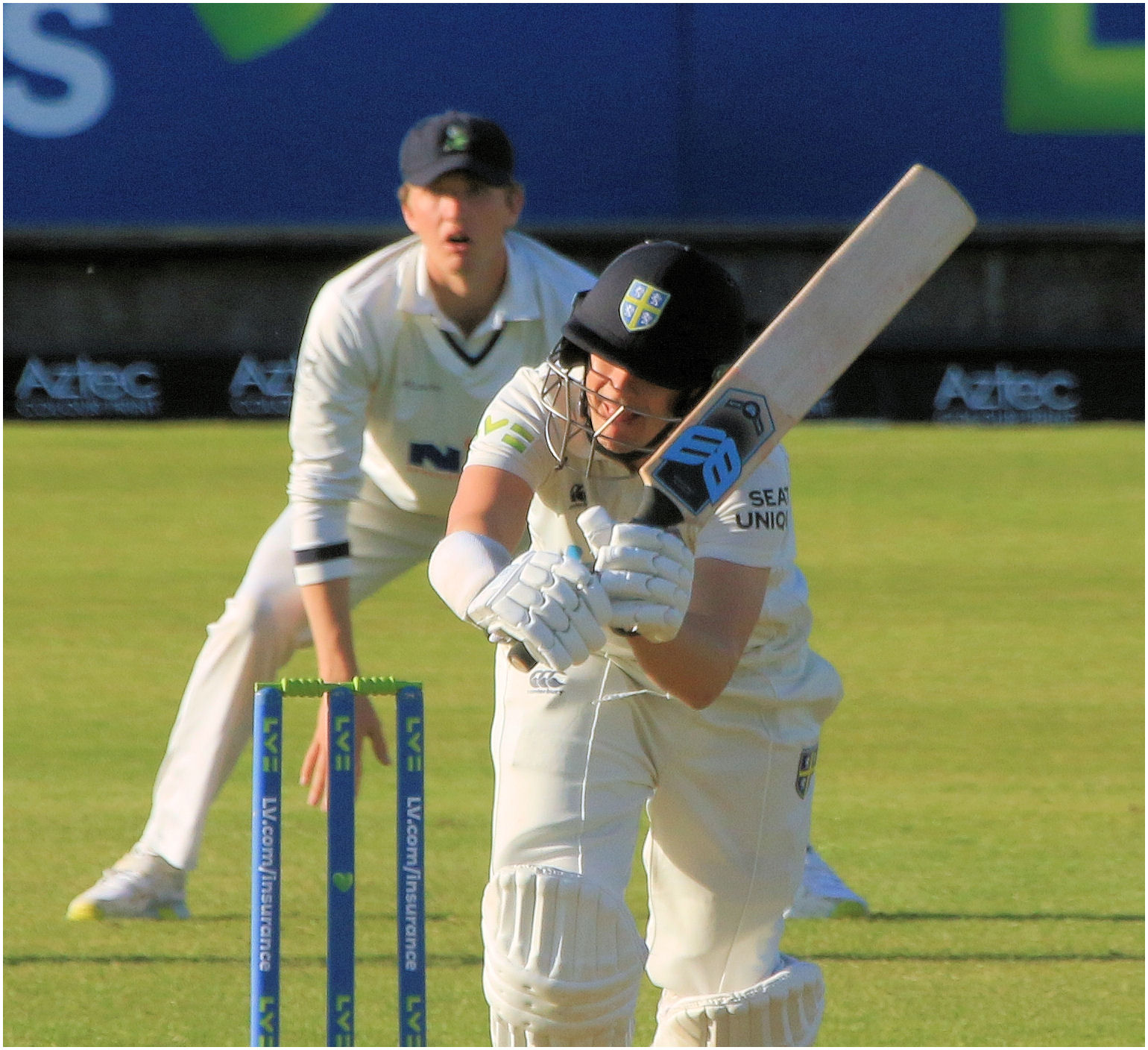
- Borthwick playing for Durham in 2023

Personal information
- Full name: Scott George Borthwick
- Born: 19 April 1990 (age 36); Sunderland, Tyne and Wear, England
- Height: 5 ft 10 in (1.78 m)
- Batting: Left-handed
- Bowling: Right-arm leg break
- Role: Batting Allrounder

International information
- National side: England (2011–2014)
- Only Test (cap 660): 3 January 2014 v Australia
- ODI debut (cap 220): 25 August 2011 v Ireland
- Last ODI: 23 October 2011 v India
- ODI shirt no.: 37
- Only T20I (cap 59): 25 September 2011 v West Indies

Domestic team information
- Years: Team
- 2008–2016: Durham (squad no. 16)
- 2014/15: Chilaw Marians Cricket Club
- 2015/16–2016/17: Wellington
- 2017–2020: Surrey (squad no. 6)
- 2021–2026: Durham (squad no. 16)

Career statistics
Competition	Test	ODI	T20I	FC
Matches	1	2	1	222
Runs scored	5	18	14	11,678
Batting average	2.50	9.00	14.00	34.55
100s/50s	0/0	0/0	0/0	22/66
Top score	4	15	14	216
Balls bowled	78	54	24	13,998
Wickets	4	0	1	229
Bowling average	20.50	–	15.00	40.06
5 wickets in innings	0	0	0	3
10 wickets in match	0	0	0	0
Best bowling	3/33	–	1/15	6/70
Catches/stumpings	2/–	0/–	1/–	275/–
- Source: Cricinfo, 11 April 2025

Scott George Borthwick (born 19 April 1990) is a former English cricketer. He was a left-handed batsman and leg-break bowler, who was the captain of Durham from 2021 to 2024. He was born in Sunderland.

== Domestic career ==
Borthwick played in the North East Premier League for Philadelphia during the 2005 campaign and played sporadic matches for Durham's Second XI in 2006. Borthwick played for Durham Academy in the North East Premier League 2007 and 2008 competitions. He also represented Tynemouth Cricket Club, as their Durham contract player for the 2009 season, with his performances safeguarding them from relegation.

Borthwick made his Twenty20 debut for Durham against Lancashire, and, despite not batting, he bowled four overs, taking 3–23.

In May 2009 Borthwick took two catches while fielding as substitute for England in the second Test against the West Indies at the Riverside Ground.

Borthwick's uncle, David, played one List-A match for Northumberland in 1994.

In 2013 Borthwick was promoted up the order and finished Durham's top scorer as they won the County Championship, scoring 1022 runs and also taking 28 wickets (fewer than only Graham Onions, Chris Rushworth and Ben Stokes), though he still described himself as "a legspinner who bats".

Borthwick left for Surrey at the end of the 2016 season but returned to Durham for 2021.

He signed a new two-year contract to become player-coach at Durham in December 2024.

On 14 September 2026, Borthwick announced he would retire from professional cricket at the end of that year's county season.

== International career ==
Borthwick was announced as a member of the England One Day International (ODI) squad for their match against Ireland in August 2011. In the one-off match he scored 15 runs off 9 balls late in England's innings, and bowled just 1 over, conceding 13 runs. He made his Twenty20 International (T20I) début on 25 September 2011 in the match against the West Indies. Borthwick was touted in December 2013 as a future Test cricket bowler by retiring England bowler Graeme Swann, who said:

"Personally, I hope little Scotty Borthwick gets the chance before long. He's a leg-spinner, he's got a bit of X-factor and he can bat as well."

He was subsequently called up to the England Test squad for the Ashes (alongside James Tredwell) in time for the 4th Ashes Test as a replacement for Swann.

He eventually made his Test debut in the fifth Test at Sydney, alongside fellow debutants Gary Ballance and Boyd Rankin. Borthwick took four wickets, including 3–33 in the second innings, but England lost heavily to complete a 5-0 Ashes series defeat. Borthwick has not played international cricket since.

As of July 2022, he holds an unusual record as the bowler with the most Test wickets without ever bowling a maiden.
