= David Rutherford =

David Rutherford may refer to:

- David Rutherford (cricketer) (born 1976), English cricketer
- David Rutherford (ice hockey) (born 1987), Canadian ice hockey player
- Dave Rutherford, Canadian conservative political talk show host

== See also ==
- David Rutherford-Jones (born 1958), retired British Army officer
