= Imran Shah =

Imran Shah may refer to:

- Imran Shah (writer)
- Imran Shah (cricketer)
- Imran Shah (field hockey)
