= William Russel (minister) =

English General Baptist minister and religious controversialist

- Died: 6 March 1702
- Occupations: General Baptist minister and religious controversialist

William Russel (died 6 March 1702) was a General Baptist minister and religious controversialist.

== Biography ==
Russel was the son of John Russel, a baptist pastor of Waddesdon, Buckinghamshire, was educated at Cambridge, where he graduated in arts, and was created M.D. per literas regias, 1688 (Cantabr. Grad. p. 336). In 1662 he was living at Chesham, Buckinghamshire, but before 1670 he settled in London, at St. Bartholomew's Close, having become first pastor of a baptist congregation at High Hall, West Smithfield. He was already known as an able controversialist. His first lance was hurled against the sabbatarians in ‘No Seventh Day Sabbath commanded by Jesus Christ in the New Testament,’ 1663, answered by Edward Stennet in ‘The Seventh Day is the Sabbath of the Lord,’ 1664, 4to. Russel next replied to ‘The Twelve Pagan Principles held by the Quakers seriously considered,’ by William Loddington, with ‘Quakerism is Paganism,’ London, 1674, 8vo. Loddington, a baptist, who never was a quaker, retorted with ‘Quakerism no Paganism,’ London, 1674.

Russel launched an ‘Epistle concerning Infant Baptism, in Answer to Two Treatises by Thomas James, Baptist Teacher of Ashford, Kent,’ 1676. He then attacked the subject of congregational singing in ‘Some Brief Animadversions on Mr. Allen's Essay of Conjoint Singing,’ London, 1696. Richard Allen replied with ‘Brief Vindication of an Essay,’ 1696, to which Richard Claridge and Russel together wrote an ‘Answer’ in 1697. The dispute was also carried on by Isaac Marlow in ‘The Controversie of Singing brought to an End,’ London, 1696, 8vo, and came to an end with the anonymous ‘Singing of Psalms vindicated from the Charge of Novelty, in Answer to Dr. Russel, Mr. Marlow,’ &c., London, 1698.

The next year, at the request of the Midland baptists, Russel wrote ‘A Vindication of the Baptized Churches from the Calumnies of Mr. Michael Harrison of Potter's Pury, Northamptonshire,’ London, 1697. On 22 February 1699 he supported baptist principles in a disputation at the presbyterian meeting-house at Portsmouth. The verbal polemic occasioned two tracts by Russel, which were answered by J. Hewerdine in ‘Plain Letters in defence of Infant Baptism,’ London, 1699, 12mo. Russel retorted to Hewerdine and other critics in ‘Infant Baptism is Will Worship,’ 1700.

From about 1680 Russel appears to have practised as a physician, and effected certain cures described in his ‘De Calculo Vesicæ,’ London, 1691. He died at an advanced age on 6 March 1702. He married early. Nehemiah, born in 1663, appears to have been his only child who reached manhood.
