= Matthew Thompson (cricketer) =

English cricketer (born 1974)

Matthew James Thompson (born 16 July 1974) is an English cricketer. He was born in Newcastle upon Tyne, Northumberland.

== Career ==
He played List A cricket for Northumberland County Cricket Club in a single match in 1999.

Thompson played as a middle-order right-handed batsman and a right-arm pace bowler in Minor Counties Championship and MCCA Knockout Trophy matches for Northumberland between 1996 and 1999. His sole List A appearance was in a first round match in the 1999 NatWest Trophy competition against Ireland; he scored 21 with the bat and failed to take a wicket in 8.5 overs of bowling.
