= John Windows =

English cricketer

Personal information
- Full name: John Bowen Windows
- Born: 6 May 1976 (age 50); Newcastle, Northumberland, England
- Batting: Right-handed
- Bowling: Right-arm medium

Domestic team information
- Years: Team
- 1997–2007: Northumberland

Career statistics
Competition	List A
Matches	9
Runs scored	144
Batting average	24.00
100s/50s	–/1
Top score	52*
Balls bowled	118
Wickets	3
Bowling average	45.33
5 wickets in innings	–
10 wickets in match	–
Best bowling	217
Catches/stumpings	–/–
- Source: Cricinfo, 19 May 2011

John Bowen Windows (born 6 May 1976) is an English cricketer. Windows is a right-handed batsman who bowls right-arm medium pace. He was born in Newcastle, Northumberland.

Windows made his debut for Northumberland in the 1996 Minor Counties Championship against Staffordshire. Windows played Minor counties cricket for Northumberland from 1997 to 2007, which included 40 Minor Counties Championship matches and 28 MCCA Knockout Trophy matches. He made his List A debut against Ireland in the 1999 NatWest Trophy. He played 8 further List A matches, the last coming against Middlesex in the 2005 Cheltenham & Gloucester Trophy. In his 9 List A matches, he scored 144 runs at a batting average of 24.00, with a high score of 52*. This came against Staffordshire in the 2002 Cheltenham & Gloucester Trophy. With the ball he took 3 wickets at a bowling average of 45.33, with best figures of 2/17.

He also played Second XI cricket for the Durham Second XI.
