= Oliver Youll =

English cricketer (born 1970)

Personal information
- Full name: Oliver Seymour Youll
- Born: 11 December 1970 (age 55); Newcastle, Northumberland, England
- Batting: Left-handed
- Bowling: Leg break
- Relatives: Michael Youll (father)

Domestic team information
- Years: Team
- 1992–1999: Northumberland

Career statistics
Competition	List A
Matches	2
Runs scored	82
Batting average	82.00
100s/50s	0/1
Top score	65
Catches/stumpings	1/–
- Source: Cricinfo, 17 May 2011

Oliver Seymour Youll (born 11 December 1970) is an English cricketer. Youll is a left-handed batsman who bowls leg break. He was born in Newcastle, Northumberland.

Youll made his debut for Northumberland in the 1992 Minor Counties Championship against Staffordshire. Youll played Minor counties cricket for Northumberland from 1992 to 1999, which included 41 Minor Counties Championship matches and 10 MCCA Knockout Trophy matches. In 1994, he made his List A debut against Nottinghamshire in the NatWest Trophy. In this match he scored 17*. He made a further appearance against Ireland in the 1999 NatWest Trophy. In this match he scored 65 runs, before being dismissed by Dwayne McGerrigle.

He is the son of the former Warwickshire and Northumberland cricketer Michael Youll.
