= Henry Twizell =

English cricketer (born 1959)

Personal information
- Full name: Peter Henry Twizell
- Born: 18 June 1959 (age 67); Rothbury, Northumberland, England
- Batting: Right-handed
- Bowling: Right-arm medium

Domestic team information
- Years: Team
- 1996: Northumberland
- 1985–1986: Gloucestershire
- 1978–1984: Northumberland

Career statistics
Competition	First-class	List A
Matches	2	6
Runs scored	0	13
Batting average	0.00	13.00
100s/50s	–/–	–/–
Top score	0	9*
Balls bowled	235	258
Wickets	2	8
Bowling average	68.00	29.50
5 wickets in innings	–	–
10 wickets in match	–	–
Best bowling	2/65	2/47
Catches/stumpings	–/–	1/–
- Source: Cricinfo, 1 July 2011

Peter Henry Twizell (born 18 June 1959) is a former English cricketer. Twizell was a right-handed batsman who bowled right-arm medium pace. He was born in Rothbury, Northumberland.

Twizell made his debut for Northumberland in the 1978 Minor Counties Championship against Cumberland. Twizell first played Minor counties cricket for Northumberland from 1978 to 1984, which included 31 Minor Counties Championship appearances and 5 MCCA Knockout Trophy matches. He made his List A debut for Northumberland against Middlesex in the 1984 NatWest Trophy, in what was his only List A appearance for the county. He took the wicket of Graham Barlow for the cost of 45 runs from 12 overs, while with the bat he scored 9 unbeaten runs.

Joining Gloucestershire, he made his first-class debut for the county against the touring Zimbabweans. In this match, Twizell bowled 13 wicket-less overs in the Zimbabweans first-innings, while in their second he took the wickets of Robin Brown and Graeme Hick for the cost of 65 runs from 15 overs. He wasn't called upon to bat in the match. The following season, he made his second and final first-class appearance for the county, against Nottinghamshire in the 1986 County Championship. His only batting innings came in the Gloucestershire first-innings, with Twizell being dismissed for a duck by Kevin Cooper. With the ball, he bowled 11.1 wicket-less overs for the cost of 38 runs. This left him with a first-class bowling average of 68.00. He played his first List A match for Gloucestershire in 1985, against Warwickshire in the John Player Special League. The following season, he made 4 further List A appearances in the 1986 John Player Special League, the last of which came against Northamptonshire. In his 5 List A matches for the county, he took 7 wickets at an average of 27.28, with best figures of 2/47. He was released by Gloucestershire at the end of the 1986 season.

He returned to Northumberland in 1996, where he made an additional 6 Minor Counties Championship appearances, with his final appearance for the county coming against Norfolk.
