= Daniel Shurben =

English cricketer

Personal information
- Full name: Daniel Graeme Shurben
- Born: 10 November 1983 (age 43); Sunderland, County Durham, England
- Batting: Left-handed

Domestic team information
- Years: Team
- 2004–present: Northumberland

Career statistics
| Competition | List A |
|---|---|
| Matches | 1 |
| Runs scored | 37 |
| Batting average | 37.00 |
| 100s/50s | –/– |
| Top score | 37 |
| Balls bowled | – |
| Wickets | – |
| Bowling average | – |
| 5 wickets in innings | – |
| 10 wickets in match | – |
| Best bowling | – |
| Catches/stumpings | –/– |
- Source: Cricinfo, 17 May 2011

Daniel Graeme Shurben (born 10 November 1983) is an English cricketer. Shurben is a left-handed batsman. He was born in Sunderland, County Durham.

Shurben made his debut for Northumberland in the 2004 Minor Counties Championship against Suffolk. Shurben has played Minor counties cricket for Northumberland from 2004 to present, which has included 21 Minor Counties Championship matches and 23 MCCA Knockout Trophy matches. He made his only List A appearance against Middlesex in the 2005 Cheltenham & Gloucester Trophy. In this match he scored 37 runs before being dismissed by Jamie Dalrymple.

He also played Second XI cricket for the Durham Second XI.
