= Paul Scott (cricketer) =

English cricketer

Personal information
- Full name: Stephen Paul Scott
- Born: 18 February 1962 (age 64); Newcastle upon Tyne, Northumberland, England, United Kingdom
- Batting: Right-handed
- Bowling: Right-arm medium
- Role: Bowler

Domestic team information
- Years: Team
- 1986–1988: Northumberland

Career statistics
Competition	List A
Matches	2
Runs scored	0
Batting average	–
100s/50s	0/0
Top score	0*
Balls bowled	102
Wickets	2
Bowling average	42.50
5 wickets in innings	0
10 wickets in match	–
Best bowling	2/55
Catches/stumpings	0/–
- Source: Cricinfo, 1 July 2011

Stephen Paul Scott (born 18 February 1962) is an English former cricketer. Scott was a right-handed batsman who bowled right-arm medium pace. He was born in Newcastle upon Tyne, Northumberland and later studied at the University of Manchester.

Scott made his debut for Northumberland in the 1986 Minor Counties Championship against Hertfordshire. Scott played Minor counties cricket for Northumberland from 1986 to 1988, which included 9 Minor Counties Championship appearances and 2 MCCA Knockout Trophy matches. He made his List A debut against Essex in the 1986 NatWest Trophy. In this match, he took wickets of Chris Gladwin and Keith Pont for the cost of 55 runs from 12 overs. In the Northumberland innings, he wasn't required to bat. He made a further List A appearance, again against Essex, in the 1987 NatWest Trophy. He bowled 5 wicket-less overs in this match, while with the ended Northumberland's innings unbeaten on 0.
