= Barry Stewart (English cricketer) =

English cricketer (born 1980)

Personal information
- Full name: Barry Stewart
- Born: 3 December 1980 (age 45); North Shields, Northumberland, England
- Batting: Right-handed
- Bowling: Right-arm medium pace

Domestic team information
- Years: Team
- 1999–2003: Northumberland

Career statistics
Competition	List A
Matches	1
Runs scored	2
Batting average	2.00
100s/50s	–/–
Top score	2
Balls bowled	60
Wickets	1
Bowling average	58.00
5 wickets in innings	–
10 wickets in match	–
Best bowling	1/58
Catches/stumpings	–/–
- Source: Cricinfo, 30 June 2011

Barry Stewart (born 3 December 1980) is an English cricketer. Stewart is a right-handed batsman who bowls right-arm medium pace. He was born in North Shields, Northumberland.

Stewart made his debut for Northumberland in the 1999 MCCA Knockout Trophy against the Durham Cricket Board. Stewart played Minor counties cricket for Northumberland from 1999 to 2003, which included 9 Minor Counties Championship matches and 6 MCCA Knockout Trophy matches. He made his only List A appearance against Leicestershire in the 2000 NatWest Trophy. In this match, he took the wicket of Chris Lewis for the cost of 58 runs from 10 overs. With the bat, he scored 2 runs before being dismissed by Anil Kumble.
