= Clipsham Old Quarry and Pickworth Great Wood =

Protected area in Rutland, England

Coordinates: 52.723°N 0.549°W

- Site of Special Scientific Interest
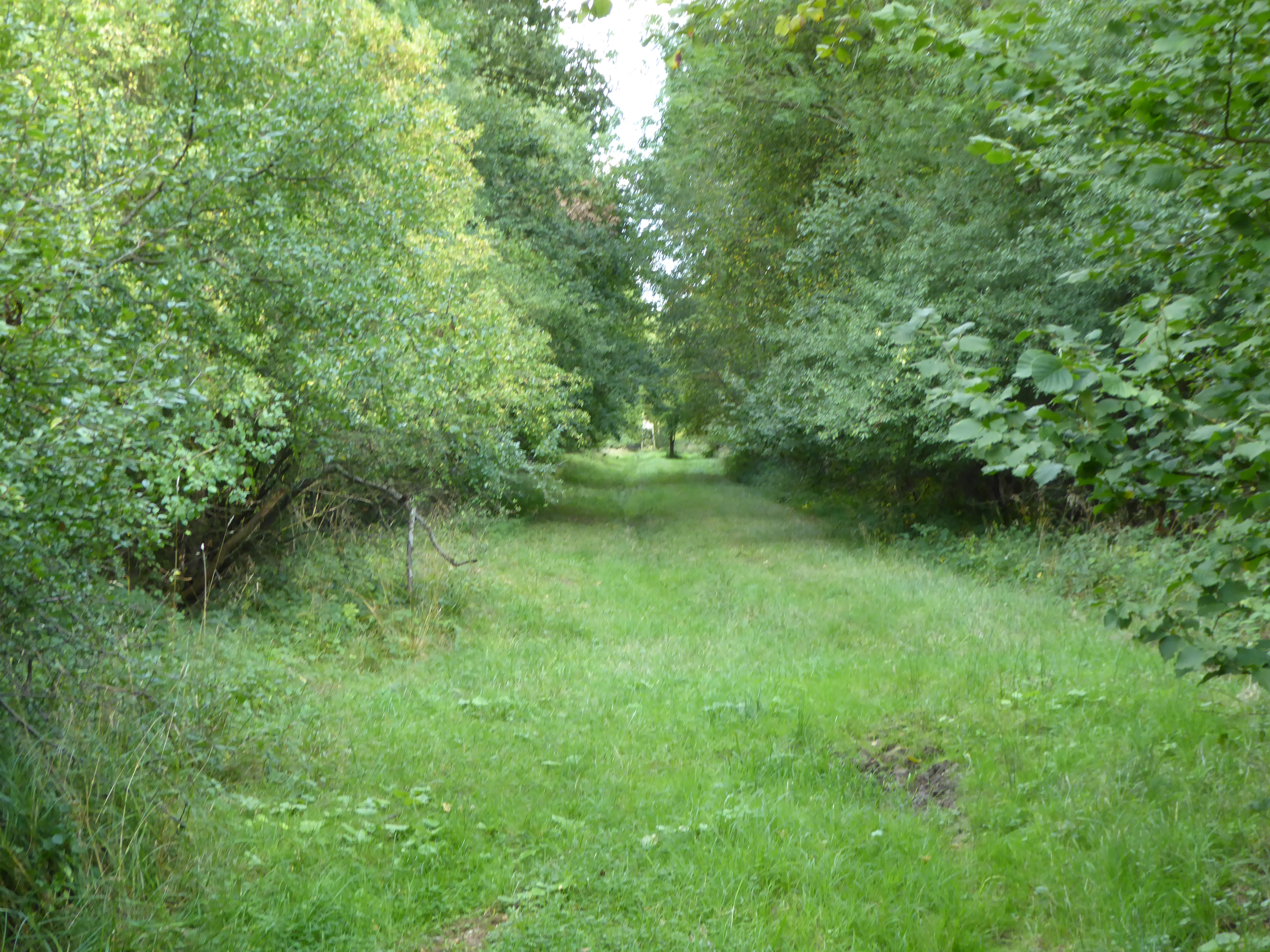
- Pickworth Great Wood
- Location of Clipsham Old Quarry and Pickworth Great Wood.
- Area of search: Rutland, England
- Grid reference: SK 981 149
- Interest: Biological; Geological
- Area: 111.2 hectares
- Notification date: 1986
- Location map: Magic Map

Clipsham Old Quarry and Pickworth Great Wood is a 111.2-hectare (275-acre) biological and geological Site of Special Scientific Interest in Rutland. It lies southeast of Clipsham and north of Pickworth. Clipsham Old Quarry is a Geological Conservation Review site, and Pickworth Great Wood is owned by the Forestry Commission.

Pickworth Great Wood is one of the largest deciduous woods in the county, with diverse breeding birds and over 150 species of moth. Clipsham Old Quarry has dense hawthorn scrub and limestone grassland with a variety of lime-loving herbs such as dwarf thistle and yellow-wort. The quarry exposes rocks of the Bajocian Middle and Upper Lincolnshire Limestone around 170 million years ago.

There is public access to Pickworth Great Wood, but not to Clipsham Old Quarry.
