= Gary Ballance =

Zimbabwean cricketer

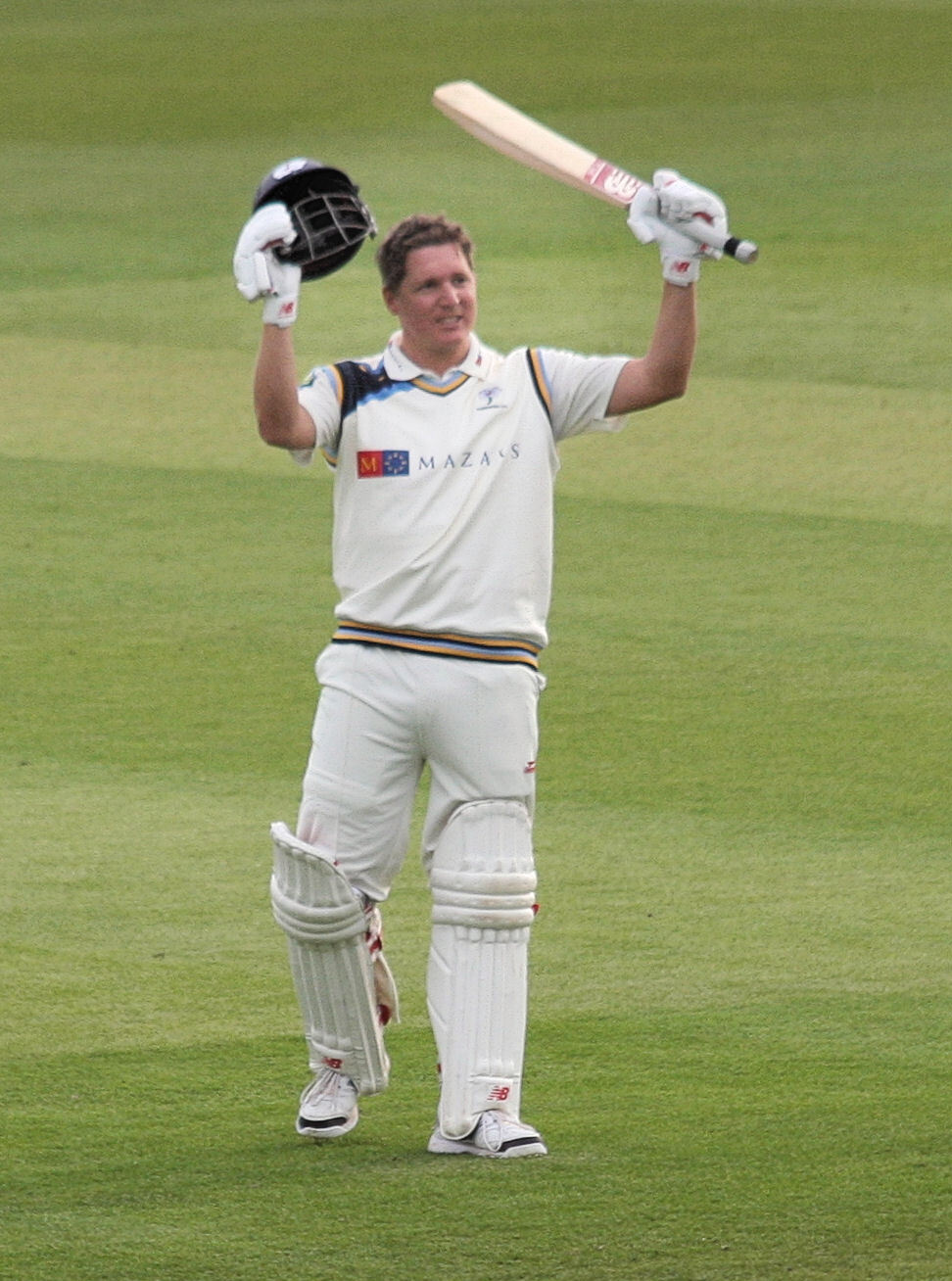
- Ballance celebrates after scoring a century for Yorkshire in 2014

Personal information
- Full name: Gary Simon Ballance
- Born: 22 November 1989 (age 36); Harare, Zimbabwe
- Batting: Left-handed
- Bowling: Right-arm leg break
- Role: Batsman

International information
- National sides: England (2013–2017); Zimbabwe (2023)
- Test debut (cap 659/121): 3 January 2014; England v Australia
- Last Test: 4 February 2023; Zimbabwe v West Indies
- ODI debut (cap 228/153): 3 September 2013; England v Ireland
- Last ODI: 25 March 2023; Zimbabwe v Netherlands
- ODI shirt no.: 48
- Only T20I (cap 72): 12 January 2023; Zimbabwe v Ireland

Domestic team information
- Years: Team
- 2006–2007: Derbyshire
- 2008–2021: Yorkshire (squad no. 19)
- 2010/11–2011/12: Mid West Rhinos
- 2022/23: Southern Rocks

Career statistics
Competition	Test	ODI	FC	LA
Matches	24	21	171	124
Runs scored	1,653	454	12,031	4,697
Batting average	40.31	25.22	47.74	47.44
100s/50s	5/7	0/4	42/55	8/29
Top score	156	79	210	156
Catches/stumpings	22/–	13/–	123/–	57/–
- Source: ESPNcricinfo, 31 August 2023

Gary Simon Ballance (born 22 November 1989) is a Zimbabwean and English former cricketer who represented England from 2013 to 2017 and also represented Zimbabwe internationally in 2023. He is a left-handed batsman and a leg break bowler, who last played for Yorkshire County Cricket Club. He was born in Harare, Zimbabwe. He is known for his style of striking deep in the crease. He qualified to play for England through residency and getting a British passport.

He had a promising start to his Test career. In his first ten Test matches, he scored 1017 runs in 17 innings at an average of 67.93, putting him behind only Sir Donald Bradman in the list of batsmen with both 1000+ test runs and an average of above 60. On 25 April 2015, Ballance became the third fastest England Test cricketer to reach 1,000 runs, a feat which he achieved during the second Test against West Indies. However, his test career failed to take off with inconsistent performances. His next 13 matches yielded two half-centuries and an aggregate of 481 runs at an average of 19.04, a sharp contrast to his first set of 10 test appearances.

Ballance first played in the Second XI Championship in 2006, having made five appearances for Zimbabwe in the 2006 Under-19 World Cup, in which the team finished in sixth place. In the final match for the team, Ballance scored a half-century, gaining notice from Derbyshire and earned the chance to sign for the team in 2006. He played his first limited overs match two weeks later, having performed in the Derbyshire Second XI.

At the end of the 2007 season, Ballance left Derbyshire to sign academy terms with Yorkshire. He made his England debut on 3 September 2013 in an ODI against Ireland. In November 2014, he won the ICC Men's Emerging Cricketer of the Year during the 2014 ICC Awards. Ballance was named a Cricketer of the Year in the 2015 edition of the Wisden Cricketers' Almanack.

Following an investigation into racism at Yorkshire County Cricket Club, Ballance released a statement admitting that he was one of the players who had used racial slurs against fellow player Azeem Rafiq. Following this announcement, he was suspended from selection by the England and Wales Cricket Board (ECB).

In 2022 it was confirmed that, having served a period of ineligibility, Ballance was eligible for selection by Zimbabwe, and had agreed a contract to do so from 2022 onwards before retiring in 2023.

== Early and personal life ==
Ballance was born and raised in Zimbabwe, where his parents were tobacco farmers. He grew and raised up in a village near Mutare, on the border of Mozambique. The tobacco farm was later confiscated by the Government of Zimbabwe which was under the helm of president Robert Mugabe.

He was sent to boarding school at the age of five. He had also occasionally played field hockey, tennis and rugby union for Zimbabwe in age group categories. However, he decided to change his mind at the age of 13 that his future would be on playing cricket. It is believed that Ballance has British roots through his grandparents with one of them having flown to the RAF during the World War II. He is also distantly related to John Timms, a cricketer who played for Northamptonshire County Cricket Club from 1925 to 1949.

He attended Springvale House and Peterhouse Boys' School. After representing Zimbabwe in cricket at various age levels, he moved to England in 2006. He attended Harrow School for two years, where he was in the same team as Sam Northeast. Playing for Harrow, he scored a century against Eton College at Lord's. Ballance is related to former Zimbabwean cricket captain David Houghton through his father, who is a cousin of David's wife.

In 2014, Ballance was reportedly seen taking his shirt off during a night out in Nottingham nightclub as he was in celebration mode in an inebriated state enjoying and relieving about the memories of his own bowling when he eventually bowled a maiden over in the first test against India which ended in a draw. Ballance was also quoted as saying he was "absolutely fucked" and that he told fans in Pandora's Box "I'm not a cricketer tonight. I'm a drunken bellend." He revealed that his captain Cook had asked whether he was interested in bowling an over and Ballance accepted the captain's offer and delivered an over.

Ballance married his wife Alex in December 2018. His wife Alex is a speech and language therapist who hails from Middlesbrough.

Ballance is colour blind and consequently struggles to see a pink ball when batting.

== Domestic career ==
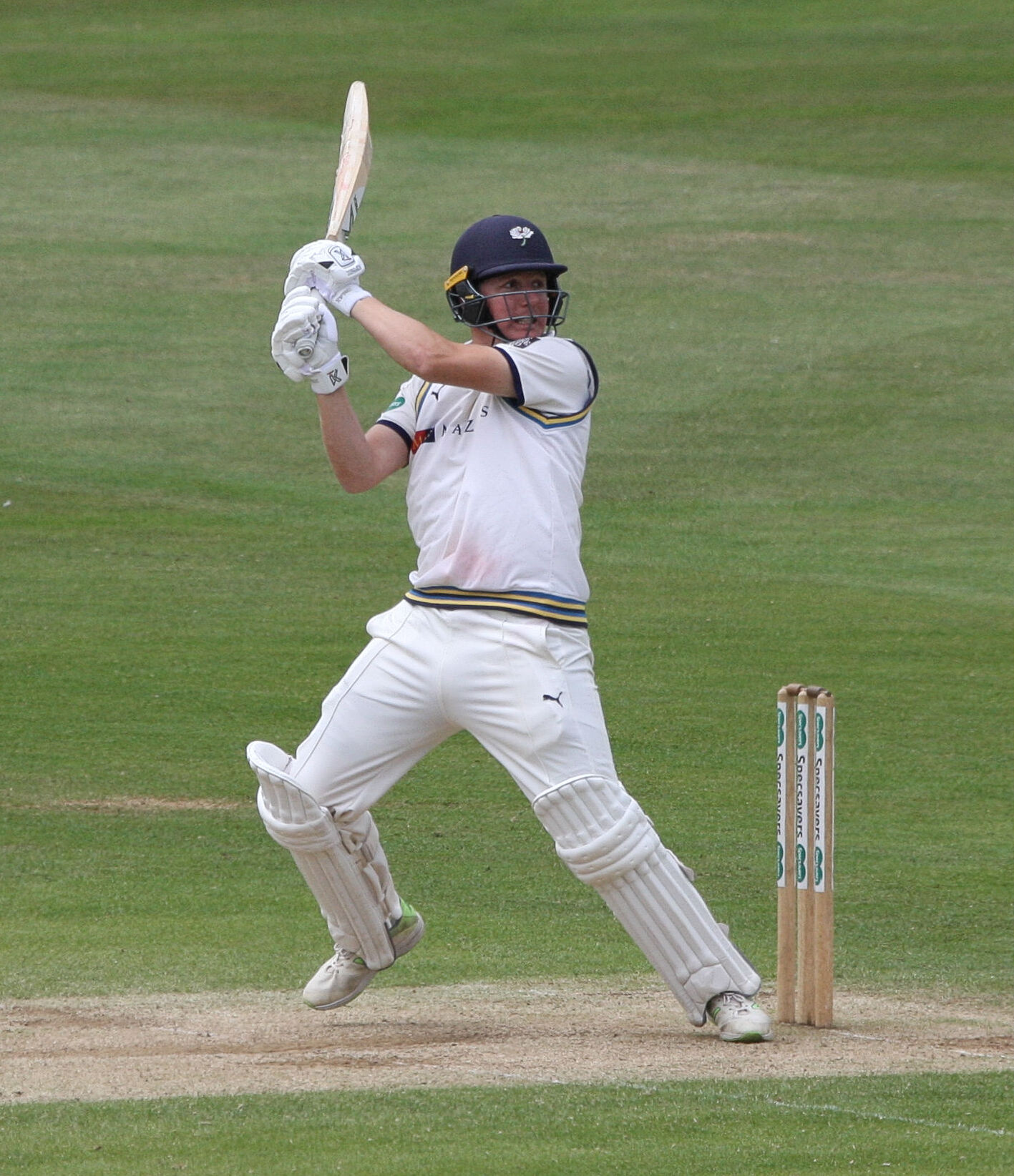
Ballance batting for Yorkshire in 2019

He obtained a sports scholarship in 2006 to Harrow and then moved to Derbyshire as an overseas player where he shared dressing room with his relative Dave Houghton, a fact which he barely knew at that time. Ballance signed for Derbyshire for the 2006 season, playing exclusively in their second XI. He made his List A debut for Derbyshire against West Indies A on 6 August 2006 during a tour match and scored a fluent 48 which helped Derbyshire to win the match by 30 runs. At the end of that season it was noted in Wisden that he was seen as a "real prospect". His 2007 season was also entirely spent in the Derbyshire second XI, with Ballance finishing as the side's leading runscorer with 390 in 6 innings, including two centuries.

His talent was immediately spotted by Geoffrey Boycott who recommended him and his parents to join Yorkshire. He joined the Yorkshire Academy in 2008 at the end of the 2007 season as an overseas player after a brief spell at Derbyshire which lasted for two seasons and he eventually attended the Leeds Metropolitan University where he studied only five lectures of a sports course, having dropped out after a year or so. It was his academy contract with Yorkshire which allowed him to be eligible to begin a university course at the Leeds Metropolitan University. He made his first-class debut for Yorkshire against Kent during the 2008 English cricket seasonat the St Lawrence Ground, Canterbury, on 11 July 2008.

He teamed up with Joe Root at Yorkshire since his move to the club in 2008 and has since maintained a close bond with the latter. He made his T20 debut for Yorkshire against Warwickshire County Cricket Club on 4 July 2010 during the 2010 Friends Provident T20.

He also spent his English county offseason time in Zimbabwe playing for Mid West Rhinos at the Logan Cup where he gained his first taste of captaincy. He played in the 2010–11 Logan Cup and 2011–12 Logan Cup before returning to England again.

He broke into the Yorkshire first team in 2011 and since then he became a regular member for the club. His consistent performances led him to be in contention to be selected for England Lions squad for a limited-overs tour of Australia in February 2013, where Ballance made three half-centuries despite England Lions being on the receiving end on every tour match. He pushed his case for selection into England senior national team after hammering centuries for England Lions against Australia and Bangladesh A during the 2013 season.

He compiled record 1251 runs at the 2013 County Championship which helped him to receive maiden test call-up with England for the 2013=2014 Ashes. He was very much hyped among English cricketing fraternity in as early 2013 including former English captain Michael Vaughan who batted for Ballance to be in the mix for England test squad following his rich vein of form for Yorkshire during the 2013 County Championship. Ballance himself grew up watching Michael Vaughan's batting whose batting style and technique he admired from early age. He also considers Sachin Tendulkar as his icon.

He missed most of the county matches for Yorkshire during the 2018 English cricket season owing to personal reasons. He made the most of the missed opportunities for Yorkshire during the 2019 County Championship piling up truckload and bulk of runs with an aggregate of 975 runs including five centuries and his performances suggested a possible international recall would be on the cards, but it did not materialise. During the 2019 County Championship season, he set a record by becoming the first Yorkshire batsman to have scored hundreds in five successive Yorkshire matches.

Ballance missed the entire 2020 domestic season, after its belated post-pandemic commencement, because of a series of reasons, including suffering from anxiety early in the season, followed by his wife testing positive for COVID-19. In September 2021, he agreed for a three-year extension of his contract with the Yorkshire club prior to the outbreak of the Azeem Rafiq racism saga. He subsequently missed the start of the 2021 season after a concussion in nets practice.

Following an investigation into racism at Yorkshire County Cricket Club, it was announced on 3 November 2021 that Ballance was the cricketer who repeatedly made racial slurs to fellow player Azeem Rafiq. Following this announcement, he was suspended from selection to play for England. Ballance issued a statement in explanation. He subsequently apologised to Rafiq for the language he used, but he also criticized the journalists and media for "the misleading and selective nature of the reporting". Ballance did not appear for Yorkshire's first team in 2022 but remained on the club's staff.

In December 2022, Ballance was released from his contract with Yorkshire two years early, under the condition that he does not play for a different County Championship side in 2023. He had not played first team cricket for Yorkshire since the scandal became public.

== International career ==
=== Debut for Zimbabwe Under-19 ===
He played for Zimbabwe national U-19 side during the 2006 U19 Cricket World Cup at the age of 16 while still being enrolled as a schoolboy at the Peterhouse Boys School in Marondera. He starred in famous upset win for Zimababwe against England both with the bat and ball as Zimbabwe won the thriller by two wickets after bowling out England for 172. Ballance was the chief destroyer of England's innings as he was the pick of the bowlers for Zimbabwe with 3/21 in four overs and he propelled Zimbabwe home with the bat as well top-scoring with 47 eventually helping his side to win the tightly fought contest by two wickets and for his all-round prowess he was awarded the player of the match. He would eventually go on to represent England internationally.

=== Debut for England ===
Following impressive performances for Yorkshire and the England Lions, Gary Ballance debuted for England against Ireland, in Dublin, on 3 September 2013 but failed to impress with the bat after getting caught behind without having scored a run.

=== 2013–14 Ashes series ===
Ballance was selected for the England squad for the 2013–14 Ashes series. He was selected to play in the 5th Test ahead of fellow Yorkshire teammate Joe Root. He became the 659th player to play for England and was handed his cap by captain Alastair Cook. He was one of three players, the others being Scott Borthwick and Boyd Rankin, to make their debuts in the 5th Test. He was sought as the best possible option to be the frontrunner to fill the No.6 batting position for England, a position which was a problematic concern for England at the time. In the first innings he made 18 runs after coming in with the score at 17/4 and helped England to 155 all out. Test match Special commentator Geoffrey Boycott acknowledged that Ballance was incredibly unlucky to be dismissed, receiving a corker that pitched in the footmarks. In the second innings he made 7 runs finishing the series with 25 runs. Ballance's next call-up was against Australia during the England tour of Australia. In the 1st ODI, at the MCG, Ballance top scored for England, making 79 runs off 96 balls. However this was not enough to help England win as Australia cruised to a 6 wicket win. Ballance kept his place for the 2nd ODI however he managed only 9 runs off 19 balls before being stumped by Brad Haddin. In the 3rd ODI Ballance batted at number 4 and made 26 runs off 42 balls. He retained his place for the 4th ODI and made 18 runs off 30 balls before being caught. Ballance was left out of the 5th ODI and was replaced by Joe Root.

=== 2014 Sri Lanka series ===
Ballance featured in the 1st ODI against Sri Lanka, he top scored with 64 runs in England's win. In the 2nd ODI he only made 5 runs in England's 99 run innings. He played in the 3rd ODI however he was not needed in England's 10 wicket win. Ballance was included in the squad for both of the test matches against Sri Lanka, batting at number three as a replacement for Jonathan Trott who had stepped away from cricket during the 2013–14 Ashes. In the first test at Lord's, he made 27 runs in the first innings before reaching his maiden Test hundred in just his second Test match in the second innings, ending not out on 104. He was one of 4 centurions in the series for England, the others being Moeen Ali, Sam Robson and Joe Root, who made a double hundred. Ballance had mixed fortunes in the second test, scoring 74 in the first innings before being dismissed for a golden duck in the second, finishing the series with 205 runs.

=== 2014 India series ===
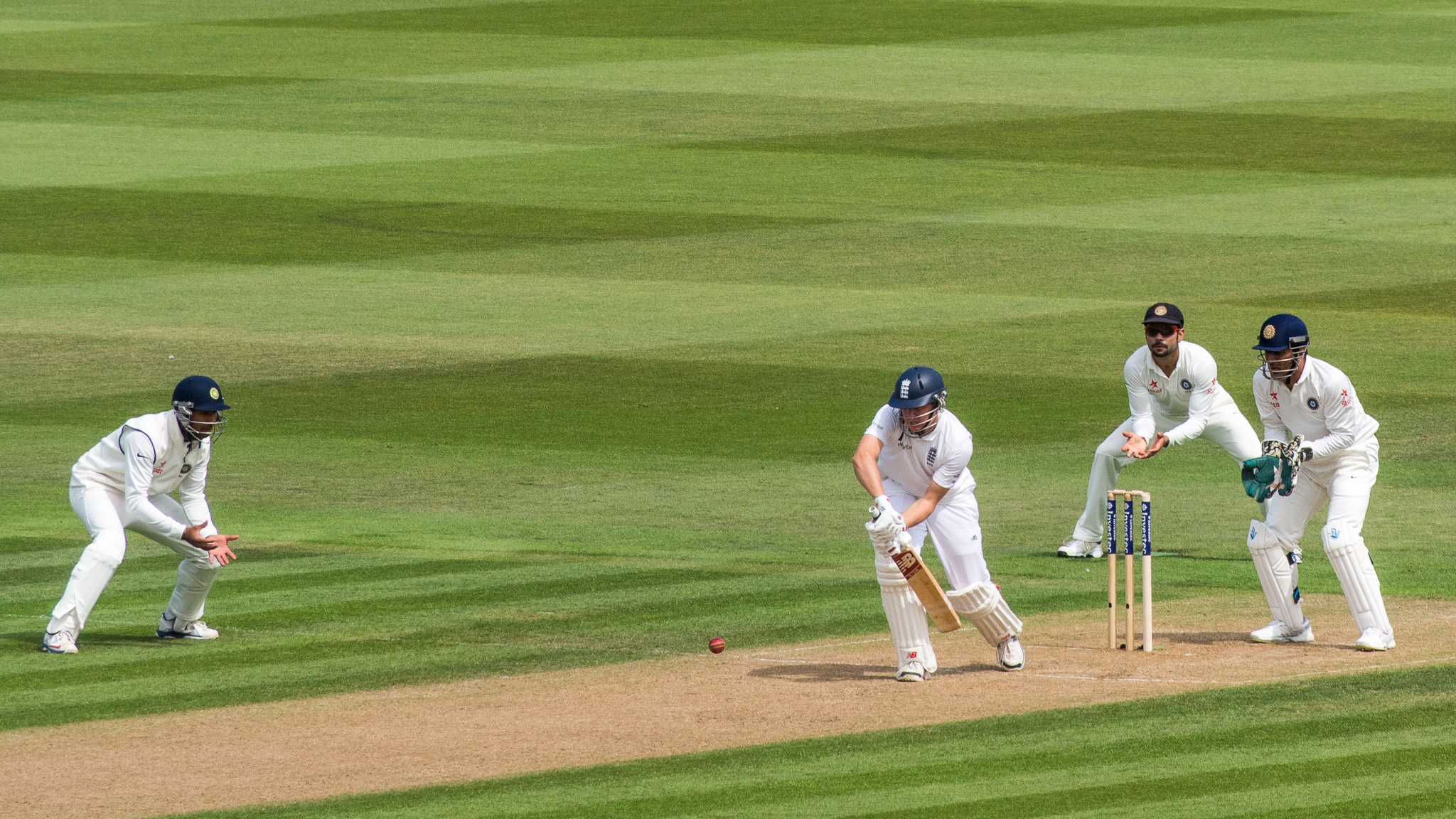
Ballance batting against India in Southampton (2014).

In the first test against India, Ballance continued his good form with the bat by making 71 in the first innings as the match ended in a draw. Ballance hit his second Test hundred on 18 July 2014 against India. He scored 110 before being caught behind off Bhuvneshwar Kumar, bringing England back into the match after struggling on 113/4. Ballance became only the third England player to score hundreds in his first two Lord's Tests, after Andrew Strauss and Jonathan Trott. Ballance scored an impressive 156 in the first innings of the third test but was unfortunate to be given out through a poor decision by the umpire. He was again unlucky when, on 38 in the second innings, he was given out caught when the ball only touched his trouser. In the fourth match of the series he was only required to bat once, making 37 as England won to go 2–1 up in the series. He made 64 in the final test to help England win the game and the series 3–1. Overall, Ballance made 503 runs at an average of 71.85 to set up the test series for England. In the one day series against India Ballance played only in the fourth ODI where he made seven runs. He redeemed himself as an ideal go-to-man for England's no 3 spot at test level and arguably a perfect successor for Jonathan Trott during the career defining series against India.

=== 2015 World Cup ===
In December 2015, he was included in the England squad for the 2015 Cricket World Cup as a surprise package as he was recalled despite modest returns in ODI cricket at that time averaging just over 26 in 12 ODI matches. Prior to his recall into the England ODI side for the 2015 World Cup, he was left out of the team for their seven match ODI series against Sri Lanka in Sri Lanka which was played in 2014. However, he endured a disastrous World Cup campaign and his shuffling back-foot technique during the tournament was exposed.

After recovering from injury Ballance played in England's opening game of the World Cup against Australia, where he was dismissed for ten. He was out for ten again as England slumped to an eight wicket defeat against New Zealand. He again only made ten against Scotland, leading to suggestions he would be dropped from the side for the next game against Sri Lanka. However, he kept his place and was dismissed for six as England lost their third game of the tournament. Ballance was then dropped from the side and played no further part in the tournament as England were eliminated at the Group stage. He, along with James Anderson, Stuart Broad, Moeen Ali, Chris Woakes and James Tredwell were dropped to focus on test cricket.

=== 2015 West Indies and New Zealand ===
Ballance continued in his role as No.3 batsman during England's tour of the West Indies. In the first Test of the three-Test series, he made ten runs in the first innings and then a century in the second innings. In addition to scoring the winning runs in the second Test, he became the third fastest England cricketer to reach 1,000 runs for his career, behind Herbert Sutcliffe and Len Hutton. In the third Test he was less prolific, making scores of 18 and 23 as England suffered two batting collapses to lose the game by five wickets and draw the series 1–1.

Ballance endured a difficult series against New Zealand. He made one in England first innings of the first Test and was then dismissed for a duck in the second innings. Despite this, England went on to win the game by 124 runs. His problems continued in the next Test as he was dismissed for 29 in England's first innings. In the second innings he was dismissed for six as England lost the game by 199 runs to draw the series 1–1.

=== 2015 Ashes series ===
In the first Ashes Test, Ballance scored 60 in the first innings, but scored a duck in the second innings, as England secured a comfortable opening win by 169 runs. In the second Test, Ballance was out for 23 in England's first innings as they were dismissed for 312. In England's second innings he was dismissed for just 14 as England were bowled out for just 103 and suffered a humiliating 405 run defeat. Following the game, Ballance was dropped in favour of Jonny Bairstow and played no further part in the series. England went on to win the series 3–2.

=== 2016 and 2017 ===
Ballance was recalled due to Nick Compton's poor form, and James Taylor being forced into retirement. Ballance returned to the side for the Test series against Pakistan and made six in England first innings. He made 43 in their second innings as England lost the opening match by 75 runs. In the second Test he only batted once, making 23 as England went on to secure a 330 run victory to level the series at 1–1. He made 70 in the first innings of the third Test, and made 23 in the second innings as England turned around the match to win 141 runs after a strong bowling display in the second innings. Ballance made eight in England's first innings of the final Test, as England were dismissed for 328. England went on to lose the game by 10 wickets and draw the series 1–1, with Ballance making 17 in England's second innings.

In the first Test against Bangladesh, Ballance could only manage scores of 1 and 9, although England did enough to win the game by 21 runs. In the second Test, Balance managed just 9 in England's total of 244, and again failed in the second innings, this time making 5 as England lost the match by 108 runs and drew the series 1–1.

On 6 July 2017, Ballance was recalled to play in the first test against South Africa at Lord's after his form recovered for Yorkshire, and was selected under Joe Root's recommendation. Ballance played the first two tests before a broken thumb ruled him out of the next two matches. He proved his mettle and justified his selection into test squad after having scored 815 runs and with an average over 101.87 for Yorkshire during the 2017 summer.

=== Debut for Zimbabwe and return to international cricket ===
In December 2022, he signed a two-year deal with Zimbabwe Cricket which would make him eligible for national selections and will also play in domestic level competitions in Zimbabwe.

Zimbabwe Cricket confirmed that Ballance had transferred allegiance following a period of ineligibility, and would represent Zimbabwe from 2022 onwards. Ballance's Zimbabwe senior debut was against a touring Ireland team in January 2023. He is set to make his full-fledged T20I debut representing Zimbabwe as he had never played a T20 International match in England colours. The series against Ireland was a mark of his return to international cricket since the infamous Yorkshire racism scandal. He made his T20I debut on 12 January, and played his first ODI in Zimbabwe colours on 18 January.

On 4 February 2023, Ballance played his first Test match for Zimbabwe, against the West Indies in Bulawayo, after previously playing 23 Tests for England, becoming the 17th cricketer to represent two international teams in Tests. He scored a century in the match, making him the second person to score a Test match century for two different countries, after Kepler Wessels.

=== Retirement ===
In April 2023, Ballance retired from all forms of professional cricket.

== See also ==
- List of cricketers who have played for two international teams
