= William Robson (cricketer) =

English cricketer

Personal information
- Full name: William George Robson
- Born: 22 March 1946 (age 80); Wallsend, Northumberland, England
- Batting: Left-handed
- Bowling: Right-arm medium
- Role: Wicket-keeper

Domestic team information
- Years: Team
- 1973–1982: Northumberland

Career statistics
| Competition | List A |
|---|---|
| Matches | 2 |
| Runs scored | 15 |
| Batting average | – |
| 100s/50s | –/– |
| Top score | 15* |
| Balls bowled | – |
| Wickets | – |
| Bowling average | – |
| 5 wickets in innings | – |
| 10 wickets in match | – |
| Best bowling | – |
| Catches/stumpings | 1/– |
- Source: Cricinfo, 2 July 2011

William George Robson (born 22 March 1946) is a former English cricketer. Robson was a left-handed batsman who fielded as a wicket-keeper, but who could also bowl right-arm medium pace. He was born in Wallsend, Northumberland.

Robson made his debut for Northumberland in the 1973 Minor Counties Championship against the Yorkshire Second XI. Robson played Minor counties cricket for Northumberland from 1973 to 1982, which included 87 Minor Counties Championship appearances. He made his List A debut against Bedfordshire in the 1977 Gillette Cup. He was not required to bat in this match, with Northumberland winning by 9 wickets. He made a further List A appearance against Somerset in 2nd round of the same competition. He scored 15 unbeaten runs in this match, while in Somerset's innings he caught behind Mervyn Kitchen.
