= All Saints' Church, Pickworth =

Church in Pickworth, Rutland

Coordinates: 52°42′47″N 0°31′57″W

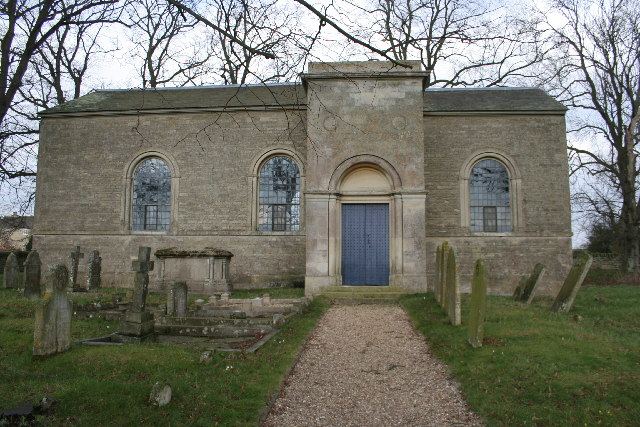
- Denomination: Church of England

History
- Dedication: All Saints

Administration
- Diocese: Peterborough
- Parish: Pickworth, Rutland

Clergy
- Rector: Don McGarrigle

All Saints' Church is the Church of England parish church in Pickworth, Rutland. Built in 1821, it is a Grade II listed building.

== History ==
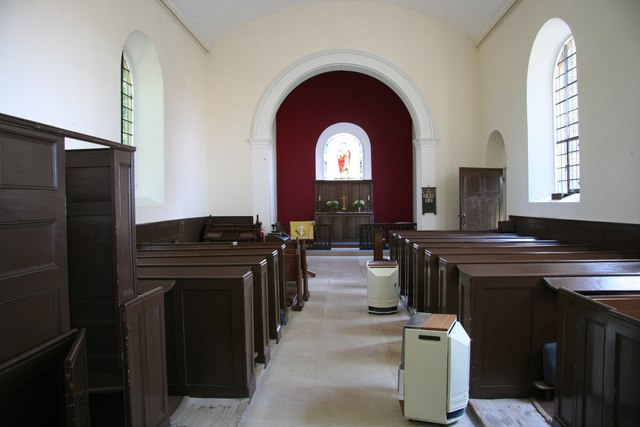
Interior, looking east

The current church opened in October 1821 but was only consecrated in 1824. The church was built by the Reverend Richard Lucas who was rector of Great Casterton-with-Pickworth and also Edith Weston. The church consists of a southern porch, nave, chancel and a western turret containing a bell. The chancel has a tablet to Joseph Armitage of Wakefield; a bequest to Lucas, his brother-in-law, helped fund the building and endowment. The simplified Norman style was influenced by the 1792 rebuilding of St Peter's Church, Tickencote.

The remains of the medieval village lie mainly to the west of the current village centre. The only visible remains, other than earthworks, is a stone arch, standing to the west of the current church. This is assumed to be the outer arch of the porch of the medieval church. The church and most of the village are thought to have disappeared after the 1470 Battle of Losecoat Field. In 1728 and 1731, the steeple was taken down and the materials used for the bridges at Great Casterton and Wakerley.
