= Lincolnshire Gate =

Coordinates: 52.7207°N 0.52134°W

- Location within Lincolnshire
- OS grid reference: SK999147
  - London: 85 mi (137 km) S
- Civil parish: Careby Aunby and Holywell
- District: South Kesteven
- Shire county: Lincolnshire; Rutland
- Region: East Midlands
- Country: England
- Sovereign state: United Kingdom
- Post town: STAMFORD
- Postcode district: PE09
- Police: Lincolnshire
- Fire: Lincolnshire
- Ambulance: East Midlands
- UK Parliament: Grantham and Stamford

Lincolnshire Gate is the name given to a corner in the road between Holywell, Lincolnshire and Pickworth, Rutland to the south-west of Castle Bytham, in Lincolnshire, England. It is situated approximately 5 miles (8 km) north from Stamford. It describes a point where this small country road crosses the county border between Lincolnshire and Rutland, to pass between Newell Wood and Howitts Gorse. On either side are the remains of small quarries, worked from the Middle Ages till the early 20th century for building and road stone for nearby use.

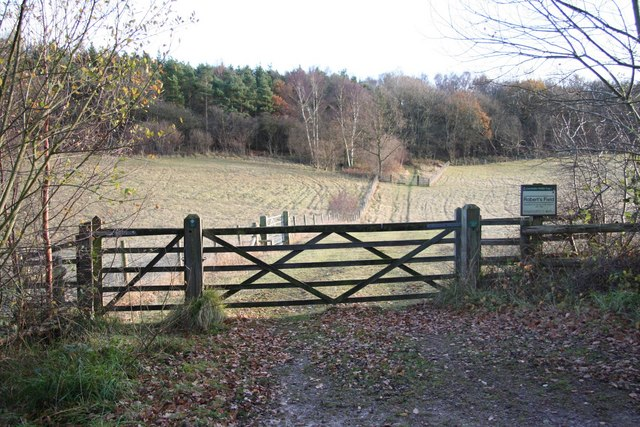
Robert's Field nature reserve in winter

Robert's Field, a 10 acres (0.04 km^{2}) calcareous grassland nature reserve and Site of Special Scientific Interest (SSSI), is 250 yards (229 m) to the north.

There are no human settlements at Lincolnshire Gate.
