= Iain Purdy =

English cricketer

Iain Colin Purdy (born 8 April 1986 in North Shields, Tyne and Wear) is an English cricketer. Purdy is a left-handed batsman and a slow left-arm bowler who has represented Northumberland.

Purdy, who made his 1st XI debut for Tynemouth CC in 2000, at the age of just fourteen, and who still plays for the side as of 2009, appeared in a single List A match for Northumberland in August 2003. In August 2002, at the age of 16, he became the youngest person to play for Northumberland County Cricket Club (he no longer holds this record) and took 5–68 on debut.
