= Francis Bugg =

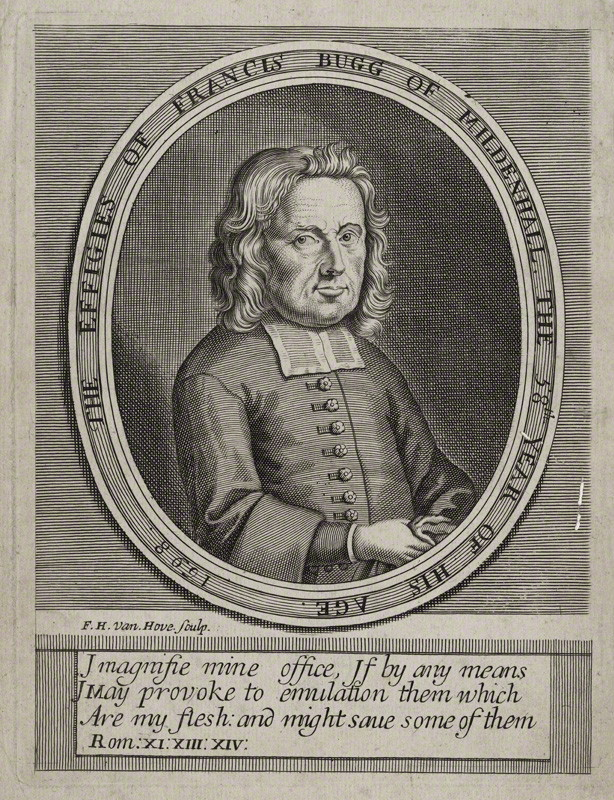
Francis Bugg, 1698 engraving

Francis Bugg (1640–1727) was an English writer against Quakerism.

== Life ==
Bugg's father was a wool-comber at Mildenhall, Suffolk, who died when his son was about fifteen, leaving him the business and some property. While still a young man he joined the Society of Friends.

Around 1675, Bugg was persuaded to go to a meeting which was interrupted by soldiers, and, with other Quakers, was arrested and fined; in default of payment his goods were distrained. Rumours circulated among the Suffolk Friends that Bugg had given information of the meeting and had received money for his treason. He held the preacher, Samuel Cater, who had urged him to attend the meeting, liable for the fine; Cater referred the matter to twelve arbitrators, who found that he was not liable.

In 1677, Bugg attended the yearly Quaker meeting in London, and complained to William Penn that the Friends in the country refused him justice. Dissatisfied with the result of a second arbitration during 1679–80, Bugg continued to agitate for the repayment of his fines, and a Quaker named George Smith attempted to settle the matter by offering to pay half: Bugg took money, and refused to return it as agreed, leading to a quarrel. The result was that he left the Quakers in 1680, and began to write against them.

Anne Docwra, a Quaker minister and Bugg's aunt, entered into controversy with him. For some years he continued to write against Quakers, on his own account receiving money from the Church of England. Docwra attacked his character, and Bugg had friends attest a certificate to it. Bugg was further attacked from the Quaker side by Thomas Ellwood, Thomas Lower, and Richard Richardson. In 1713, he was imprisoned for unknown reasons in Ely, and then for the rest of his life appears to have resided at Mildenhall.

== Works ==
Bugg's major works were:

- De Christiana Libertate, or Liberty of Conscience, upon its true and proper grounds Asserted and Vindicated. And the Mischief of Impositions, amongst the People called Quakers, made Manifest, 1682.
- The Painted Harlot both Stript and Whipt, or the second part of Naked Truth, 1683 (second part of the above).
- Reason against Railing; and Truth against Falsehood. Being a conclusive Postscript to be Annexed to a Book entituled The Painted Harlot both Stript and Whipt, 1683.
- The Quakers Detected, their Errours Confuted, and their Hypocrisie Disavered, 1686. In this book Bugg gives an account of the reasons why he joined the Society of Friends.
- Battering Rams against New Rome, 1690–1.
- New Rome Unmask'd, and Her Foundation Shaken, 1692.
- New Rome Arraigned, and out of her own mouth Condemned, 1693.
- Quakerism Withering and Christianity Reviving; or a Brief Reply to the Quakers' Pretended Vindication, 1694.
- The Quakers set in their True Light, in order to give the Nations a clear sight of what they hold, 1696.
- A Brief History of the Rise, Growth, and Progress of Quakerism, 1697.
- The Picture of Quakerism, drawn to the Life, in two parts, 1697.
- The Pilgrim's Progress from Quakerism to Christianity, 1698.
- Quakerism Exposed to Publick Censure, 1699.
- A Modest Defence of my Book, entituled "Quakerism Exposed", 1700.
- News from New Rome, occasioned by the Quakers' challenging of Francis Bugg, whereby their Errors are further Exposed, 1701.
- A Seasonable Caveat against the Prevalency of Quakerism. Containing a List of one of their Parliaments and Forty-four of their Canon Laws, 1701.
- A Narrative of the Conference at Sleeford in Lincolnshire between Francis Bugg and Henry Pickworth, 25 Aug. 1701,’ 1702. Henry Pickworth defended the Quakers against Bugg at Sleaford, but is considered to have been worsted. He shortly became an ally of Bugg.
- Quakerism Drooping, and its Cause Sinking, 1703.
- A Finishing Stroke; or some Gleanings collected out of the Quakers' Books, by way of Prologue, never before Published, whereby the Great Mystery of the Little Whore is farther exposed, 1712, containing (1) The Great Mystery of the Little Whore unfolded and her Witchcrafts discovered, 1705. (2) Quakerism struck Speechless, 1706. (3) Hidden Things brought to Light, whereby the Fox is unkennelled, 1707. (4) Goliah's Head cut off with his own Sword, and the Quakers routed by their own Weapons, 1708. (5) Quakerism Anatomised and finally Dissected, 1709. (6) A Retrospective Glass for Misled Quakers, 1710. (7) The Quakers' Infallibility shaken all to Pieces, 1711.
- The Picture of Quakerism once more drawn to the Life; with Quakerism a Grand Imposture, in eight parts, 1714–17.
- A New Frame for the Picture of Quakerism, in eight parts, 1719.
- Strong Motives for an Impartial Examination of the Principles, Doctrines, and Practices of the Quakers, 1724.

== Notes ==
Attribution

This article incorporates text from a publication now in the public domain: Stephen, Leslie, ed. (1886). "Bugg, Francis". Dictionary of National Biography. Vol. 7. London: Smith, Elder & Co.
