= Michael Anderson (cricketer, born 1960) =

English cricketer

Personal information
- Full name: Michael Anderson
- Born: 23 April 1960 (age 66); Newcastle upon Tyne, England
- Batting: Right-handed
- Bowling: Leg-break

Domestic team information
- Years: Team
- 1984: Northumberland Cricket Club

Career statistics
Competition	LA
Matches	1
Runs scored	11
Batting average	11
100s/50s	0/0
Top score	11
Catches/stumpings	0/–
- Source: CricketArchive, 12 August 2008

Michael Anderson (born 23 April 1960) is an English List A cricketer who played his only List A game for Northumberland Cricket Club. His highest score of 11 came when playing for Northumberland in the match against Middlesex County Cricket Club.

He has also played 19 Minor Counties Championship games for Northumberland. and 4 Minor Counties Trophy for the same team.
