= Martin Pollard =

English cricketer

Personal information
- Full name: Martin Lee Pollard
- Born: 2 August 1977 (age 49); Shotley Bridge, County Durham, England
- Batting: Right-handed
- Bowling: Right-arm medium-fast

Domestic team information
- Years: Team
- 2001–2006: Northumberland

Career statistics
Competition	List A
Matches	3
Runs scored	10
Batting average	10.00
100s/50s	–/–
Top score	6
Balls bowled	156
Wickets	2
Bowling average	39.50
5 wickets in innings	–
10 wickets in match	–
Best bowling	1/18
Catches/stumpings	–/–
- Source: CricketArchive, 17 May 2011

Martin Lee Pollard (born 2 August 1977) is an English cricketer. Pollard is a right-handed batsman who bowls right-arm medium-fast. He was born in Shotley Bridge, County Durham.

Pollard made his debut for Northumberland in the 2001 Minor Counties Championship against the Hertfordshire. Pollard played Minor counties cricket for Northumberland from 2001 to 2006, which included 19 Minor Counties Championship matches and 17 MCCA Knockout Trophy matches. He made his List A debut against Staffordshire in the 2nd round of the 2002 Cheltenham & Gloucester Trophy which was held in 2001. He played 2 further List A matches, against Leicestershire in the 2003 Cheltenham & Gloucester Trophy and Middlesex in the 2005 Cheltenham & Gloucester Trophy. In his 3 List A matches, he took 2 wickets at a bowling average of 39.50, with best figures of 1/18. He currently plays for Tynemouth CC, in the North East Premier League, having done so since 2016, bowling off-spin, and has recently passed 500 NEPL wickets, despite major knee surgery for Sarcoma in 2020. Previously he played for Hetton Lyons, Blaydon, Benwell Hill (where he won the North East Premier League in 2002), Ashington, Gateshead Fell, Halesowen and Moseley Ashfield.
