= Richard Finch (Quaker) =

Richard Finch was a merchant in London and a Quaker. In 1746, he wrote a pamphlet entitled The Nature and Duty of Self-Defence: Addressed to the People called Quakers, which argued against Quaker beliefs on pacifism. His opposition to pacifism takes the form of two arguments, one theological and the other not. The theological argument is that man has a right to self-defence which was not abolished by Jesus in the gospels. The second argument draws an analogy between defending against an external aggressor and the right for a government to defend against a civil rebellion or a criminal.

Finch mentions in his pamphlet a number of Quaker soldiers who deserted their duty. Peter Brock supposes that these may have included Joseph Harwood and two of his fellow soldiers. While in hospital, Harwood had slept alongside a soldier who had been raised a Quaker and who lamented his non-adherence to the pacifism of his faith. Harwood and two other soldiers he had influenced were convicted under martial law for laying down his arms during battle. (Harwood and his two companions were later pardoned by King George II.)

Responses to his booklet against pacifism came from a number of Quaker writers including Joseph Besse and from an unknown and anonymous author who wrote a response called A Modest Plea in behalf of the People call'd Quakers.

In 1755, Finch published a second pamphlet recanting his anti-pacifist views titled Second Thoughts concerning War, wherein that great subject is candidly considered, and set in a new light, in answer to, and by the author of a late pamphlet, intitled "The Nature and Duty of Self Defence, addressed to the People called Quakers". In the text, he states that his previous views were due to a period of doubt and unbelief.

The historian Peter Brock draws a parallel between Finch's (albeit later recanted) anti-pacifism and the views of the banker and abolitionist Samuel Hoare Jr who similarly expressed some anti-pacifist beliefs.
