= Richard Dreyer =

English cricketer (born 1960)

Personal information
- Full name: Richard Dreyer
- Born: 24 November 1960 (age 65); Morpeth, Northumberland, England
- Batting: Right-handed
- Bowling: Right-arm medium Right-arm off break

Domestic team information
- Years: Team
- 1984–1989: Northumberland

Career statistics
Competition	List A
Matches	2
Runs scored	31
Batting average	15.50
100s/50s	–/–
Top score	26
Balls bowled	–
Wickets	–
Bowling average	–
5 wickets in innings	–
10 wickets in match	–
Best bowling	–
Catches/stumpings	1/–
- Source: Cricinfo, 1 July 2011

Richard Dreyer (born 24 November 1960) is a former English cricketer. Dreyer was a right-handed batsman who bowled both right-arm medium and right-arm off break. He was born in Morpeth, Northumberland.

Dreyer made his debut for Northumberland in the 1984 Minor Counties Championship against Lincolnshire. Dreyer played Minor counties cricket for Northumberland from 1984 to 1989, which included 22 Minor Counties Championship appearances and 3 MCCA Knockout Trophy matches. He made his List A debut against Essex in the 1986 NatWest Trophy. Batting, he reached 26 runs before being run out. He made a further List A appearance, again against Essex, in the 1987 NatWest Trophy. He scored 12 runs in this match, before being dismissed by Don Topley.
