= 2012–13 Logan Cup =

First-class cricket competition

- Administrator: Zimbabwe Cricket
- Cricket format: First-class cricket (4 days)
- Tournament format: League system
- Champions: Matabeleland Tuskers (3rd title)
- Participants: 5
- Matches: 20
- Most runs: 686 – Richmond Mutumbami (Southern Rocks)
- Most wickets: 38 – Ed Rainsford (Mid West Rhinos)

The 2012–13 Logan Cup was a first-class cricket competition held in Zimbabwe from 30 September 2012 to 7 March 2013. The tournament was won by the Matabeleland Tuskers, who claimed their third consecutive title. The format of the competition was unchanged from the previous season, with five sides playing each other twice in a round-robin format.

Richmond Mutumbami of the Southern Rocks finished the competition as the leading run-scorer, accumulating 686 runs. The leading wicket-taker was Ed Rainsford of the Mid West Rhinos, who took 38 wickets.

== Points table ==
Team	Pld	W	L	D	T	A	Pts
Matabeleland Tuskers	8	5	1	2	0	0	41
Mountaineers	8	5	2	1	0	0	39
Mid West Rhinos	8	4	4	0	0	0	28
Southern Rocks	8	3	4	1	0	0	25
Mashonaland Eagles	8	0	6	2	0	0	7
Source:ESPNcricinfo
