= Peter Atkinson (cricketer) =

English cricketer

Peter Atkinson (born 14 December 1949) was an English List A cricketer. He was a left-handed batsman who played for Northumberland. He was born in Gainsborough.

Atkinson represented Worcestershire Second XI in the Second XI Championship between 1966 and 1968. Having taken a year out of the game, he played his first Minor Counties Championship game for Northumberland in 1970.

Atkinson made his only List A appearance for the team in the 1971 Gillette Cup, against Lincolnshire. Opening the batting for Northumberland, Atkinson failed to score.

He also played football, playing for Sheffield United before joining Rotherham United in May 1969. He made three appearances for Rotherham in the Football League. Atkinson later played for Ilkeston Town from 1970 to 1974, making 175 appearances and scoring one goal.
