= Michael Youll =

English cricketer

Personal information
- Full name: Michael Youll
- Born: 26 April 1939 (age 87); Newcastle upon Tyne, Northumberland, England
- Batting: Left-handed
- Bowling: Left-arm unorthodox spin
- Relatives: Oliver Youll (son)

Domestic team information
- Years: Team
- 1956–1957: Warwickshire
- 1962–1981: Northumberland

Career statistics
| Competition | First-class | List A |
|---|---|---|
| Matches | 4 | 3 |
| Runs scored | 15 | 65 |
| Batting average | 7.50 | 32.50 |
| 100s/50s | 0/0 | 0/0 |
| Top score | 9 | 36* |
| Balls bowled | 506 | – |
| Wickets | 14 | – |
| Bowling average | 21.57 | – |
| 5 wickets in innings | 1 | – |
| 10 wickets in match | 0 | – |
| Best bowling | 5/99 | – |
| Catches/stumpings | 2/– | 1/– |
- Source: Cricinfo, 2 July 2011

Michael Youll (born 26 April 1939) is a former English cricketer, a left-handed batsman who bowled left-arm unorthodox spin. He was born in Newcastle upon Tyne, Northumberland.

Youll made his first-class debut for Warwickshire against Scotland in 1956. He made three further appearances for Warwickshire, the last of them against Combined Services in 1957. In his four first-class matches, he took 14 wickets at an average of 21.57, with a single five wicket haul in his debut match in 1956: 5 for 99 in the first innings.

In 1957, at the age of 18, he was the leading wicket-taker in the Minor Counties Championship, with 62 wickets at an average of 16.41. Despite this success, he completely lost his bowling form in 1958 and afterwards played purely as a batsman. He did his National Service in the Royal Air Force during his time at Warwickshire, and had fewer opportunities thereafter, leaving the county at the end of the 1961 season.

Youll joined Northumberland in 1962, making his debut in that season's Minor Counties Championship against the Yorkshire Second XI. He played Minor counties cricket for Northumberland from 1962 to 1981, including over 100 Minor Counties Championship appearances. He made his List A debut for Northumberland against Lincolnshire in the 1971 Gillette Cup. He made two further List A appearances, both in the 1977 Gillette Cup. In 1978, when he captained Northumberland, he was the highest scorer in the Minor Counties Championship, with 889 runs at an average of 42.33.

His son Oliver also played Minor Counties and List A cricket for Northumberland.
