= Timothy Adcock =

Cricketer (born 1972)

Personal information
- Full name: Timothy William Adcock
- Born: 25 May 1972 (age 54); Wegberg, North Rhine-Westphalia, West Germany
- Batting: Right-handed
- Role: Wicket-keeper

Domestic team information
- Years: Team
- 1993–2000: Northumberland

Career statistics
Competition	List A
Matches	1
Runs scored	28
Batting average	28.00
100s/50s	0/0
Top score	28
Catches/stumpings	0/0
- Source: Cricinfo, 28 June 2011
- Military career
- Allegiance: United Kingdom
- Branch: Royal Air Force
- Rank: Flight lieutenant

Timothy William Adcock (born 25 May 1972) is a former English cricketer and current Royal Air Force officer. In cricket, Adcock was a right-handed batsman who fielded as a wicket-keeper. He was born in Wegberg, North Rhine-Westphalia, West Germany.

Adcock made his debut for Northumberland in the 1993 Minor Counties Championship against Suffolk. Adcock played Minor counties cricket for Northumberland from 1993 to 2000, which included 38 Minor Counties Championship matches and 7 MCCA Knockout Trophy matches. He made his only List A appearance against Nottinghamshire in the 1994 NatWest Trophy. In this match, he scored 28 runs before being dismissed by Mark Crawley.

Adcock is a flight lieutenant in the Royal Air Force, where he plays for the Royal Air Force cricket team.
