= Newell Wood =

Coordinates: 52.718°N 0.517°W

- Site of Special Scientific Interest
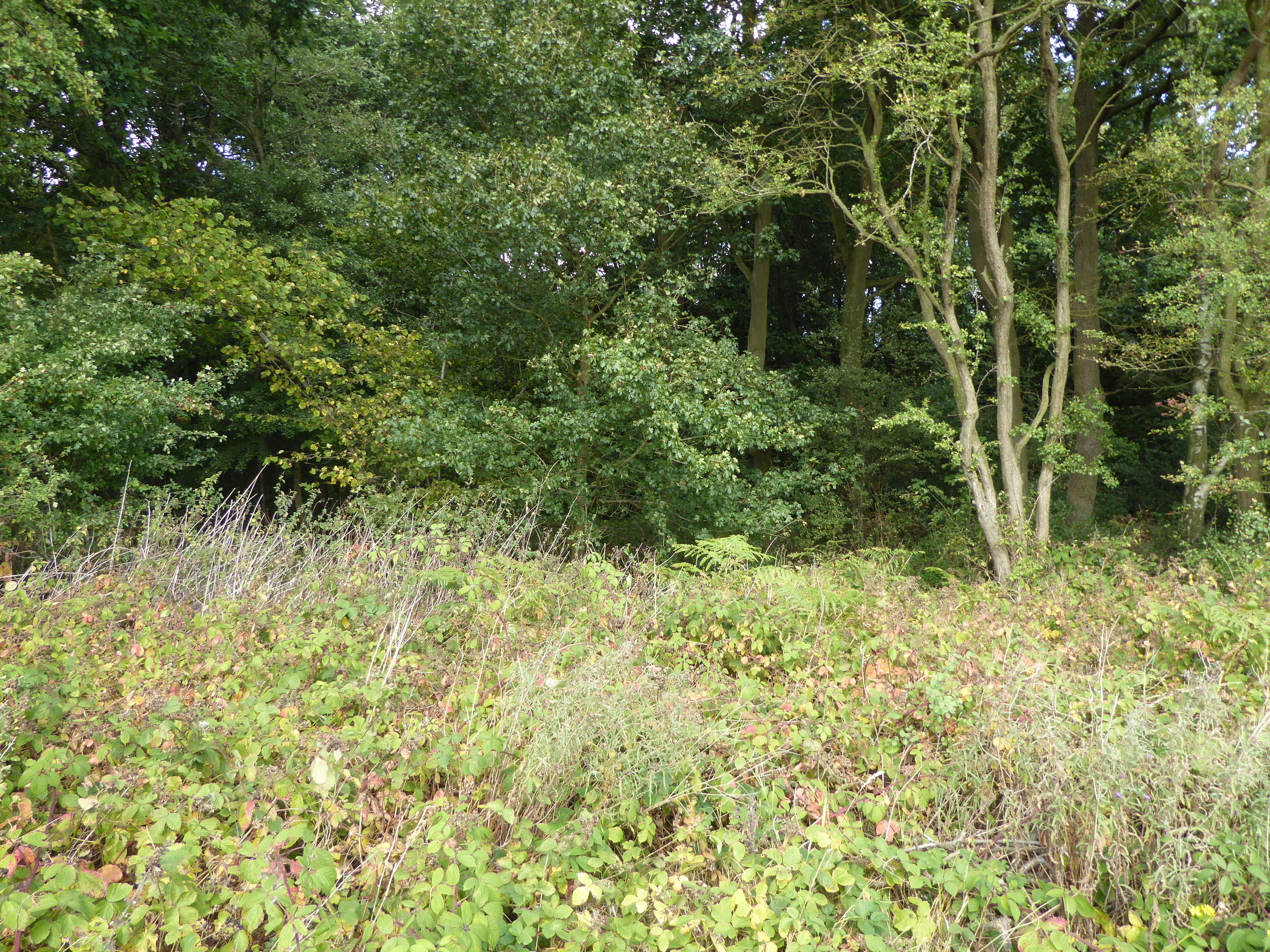
- Location of Newell Wood.
- Area of search: Rutland
- Grid reference: TF 003 144
- Interest: Biological
- Area: 33.3 hectares
- Notification date: 1983
- Location map: Magic Map

Newell Wood is a 33.3-hectare (82-acre) biological Site of Special Scientific Interest east of Pickworth in Rutland, adjacent to Lincolnshire Gate.

This acid semi-natural woodland is mainly on glacial sands and gravels, but some areas are on clays and siltstones. It is dominated by oak and birch, and ground flora includes bracken, wood sorrel and early purple orchid.

The site is private land with no public access.
