= Jim Purvis (cricketer) =

English cricketer

Personal information
- Full name: James Robert Purvis
- Born: 31 May 1954 (age 72); Blyth, Northumberland, England
- Batting: Left-handed
- Bowling: Left-arm medium-fast

Domestic team information
- Years: Team
- 1979–1991: Norfolk

Career statistics
Competition	List A
Matches	2
Runs scored	0
Batting average	0.00
100s/50s	–/–
Top score	0
Balls bowled	84
Wickets	1
Bowling average	64.00
5 wickets in innings	–
10 wickets in match	–
Best bowling	1/42
Catches/stumpings	–/–
- Source: Cricinfo, 1 July 2011

James Robert Purvis (born 31 May 1954) is a former English cricketer. Purvis was a left-handed batsman who bowled left-arm medium-fast. He was born in Blyth, Northumberland.

Purvis made his debut for Northumberland in the 1979 Minor Counties Championship against Lincolnshire. Purvis played Minor counties cricket for Northumberland from 1979 to 1991, which included 69 Minor Counties Championship appearances and 5 MCCA Knockout Trophy matches. He made his List A debut against Essex in the 1987 NatWest Trophy. In this match, he took his only List A wicket, dismissing Graham Gooch. With the bat, he was dismissed for a duck by Neil Foster. He made a further List A appearance against Surrey in the 1989 NatWest Trophy. He bowled 4 wicket-less overs in this match, while with the bat he wasn't called upon.
