= Barbara Blaugdone =

English Quaker preacher

Barbara Blaugdone (c. 1609–1704) was an English Quaker preacher, who left an autobiographical account of her travels, evangelism, and religious and political views. She was imprisoned several times for preaching her beliefs.

== Early life ==
Blaugdone's maiden name is not known. She is likely to have been born in Bristol, where she later lived and became converted. All that she herself wrote of that period is that she "feared the Lord" and "sought him earnestly." Nothing is known either of her husband, whom she appears to have lost at a relatively early age.

According to the Quaker writer Joseph Besse, Blaugdone was "a Woman of good Parts and Education." She was well-educated and became a teacher, but her conversion to Quakerism led her pupils to withdraw from her school. Unusually, she had means that allowed her to pay her expenses as a Quaker minister out of her own pocket. As she put it, "In all my Travels, I Travelled still on my own Purse, and was never chargeable to any, but paid for what I had."

The conversion of Barbara Blaugdone was effected by John Audland and John Camm in 1654. She may have been one of the "Bristol Seekers", many of whom were recruited around that time. She then "abstained for a year from all Flesh, Wine and Beer" and became plain of speech. In the same year she was imprisoned for entering Bristol churches "to bear testimony against their formalities" and was stabbed on leaving a meeting being held at a private house.

== Ministry ==
In the Quaker sense of the time, ministry "encompassed not just preaching, prophecy, and overtly 'religious' activity, but also any witnessing to the faith, be it in the home, the marketplace or workplace.... An example had to be set in all those places." Those like Blaugdone, who were travelling ministers, had received the endorsement of their weekly (local), monthly (district) and yearly (national) Quaker meetings. They were referred to as "Public Friends".

The activity of Quakers such as Blaugdone met with public violence and was generally held to breach several laws, including the Act of Uniformity 1662 for not attending church, the Vagrancy Acts of 1596 and 1601 for illegal assembly, and the Blasphemy Act of 1650, which punished any who claimed to be godlike or equal to God. The Quaker belief in moral perfection and the possibility of transcending sin through communion in God were sometimes interpreted in that light.

Soon after her conversion, Blaugdone travelled to Basingstoke to seek the release of two imprisoned Quakers and successfully pleaded their case with the mayor. It was on a similar mission that she sailed in 1656 for Ireland, where she met Henry Cromwell, son of the Lord Protector. Her enthusiasm and powerful preaching in Cork led to accusations of witchcraft and to imprisonment. She returned home on her release but was soon back in Dublin inveighing to the court of justice and incurring imprisonment and personal violence, having been blamed on the voyage for the storms the ship encountered and almost thrown overboard. She was again imprisoned in Limerick, Cork and Kinsale, before being banished from Ireland. In 1657, Barbara Blaugdone was attacked in Marlborough for attempting to speak out in church. Released after six weeks, she went to the mayor and reproached him so powerfully that he attempted thereafter to protect Quakers. At Exeter she was held for a long time on remand, then "whipt till the Blood ran down my back."

Blaugdone remained active after the Restoration, being imprisoned for attending a Quaker meeting in Bristol in 1681, and again two years later in Ilchester, where she was also fined £280 for failing to attend the Church of England. Early in 1686 she wrote and delivered a political letter to James II protesting about the treatment of Quakers.

Blaugdone's Account..., published in 1691, had circulated privately for some years before. It describes her life up to 1657. Two other writings of hers intended for publication were censored in 1689. Her writings have been said to stand out from those of other female Quaker ministers in that period, for their "forthright descriptive manner, which incorporates the cumulative technique of folk-lore that adds event to event and thereby builds intensity."

Barbara Blaugdone died in 1704 in London.
