= Rick Sellers =

English cricketer (born 1980)

Richard John "Rick" Sellers (born 8 March 1980) is an English cricketer. He is a right-handed batsman and a right-arm off-break bowler who came through the Lancashire County junior ranks, represented the LCB XI (senior amateur County side) and Lancashire 2ndXI before playing for Northumberland between 1999 and 2001. He was born in Bolton.
