= Paul Pickworth =

English cricketer (born 1958)

Personal information
- Full name: Paul John Pickworth
- Born: 22 September 1958 (age 68); Corbridge, Northumberland, England
- Batting: Left-handed

Domestic team information
- Years: Team
- 1981–1984: Northumberland

Career statistics
Competition	List A
Matches	1
Runs scored	5
Batting average	5.00
100s/50s	–/–
Top score	5
Balls bowled	–
Wickets	–
Bowling average	–
5 wickets in innings	–
10 wickets in match	–
Best bowling	–
Catches/stumpings	–/–
- Source: Cricinfo, 1 July 2011

Paul John Pickworth (born 22 September 1958) is a retired English cricketer. Pickworth was a left-handed batsman. He was born in Corbridge, Northumberland.

Pickworth made his debut for Northumberland in the 1981 Minor Counties Championship against Lincolnshire. Pickowrth played Minor counties cricket for Northumberland from 1981 to 1984, which included 10 Minor Counties Championship matches and 3 MCCA Knockout Trophy matches. He made his only List A appearance against Middlesex in the 1984 NatWest Trophy. In this match, he scored 5 runs before being dismissed by John Emburey.
