= Pickworth, Rutland =

Village in Rutland, England

Coordinates: 52.713°N 0.532°W

Pickworth
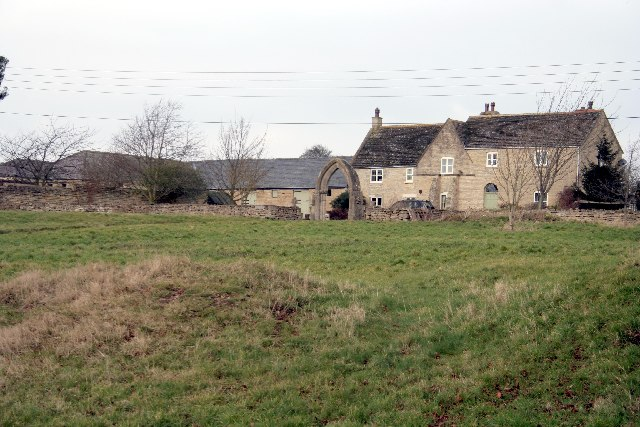
- Remains of Pickworth old church and Manor House

- Location within Rutland
- Area: 3.88 sq mi (10.0 km^{2})
- Population: 81 2001 Census
  - Density: 21/sq mi (8.1/km^{2})
- OS grid reference: SK990140
  - London: 86 miles (138 km) SSE
- Civil parish: Pickworth
- Unitary authority: Rutland
- Shire county: Rutland
- Ceremonial county: Rutland
- Region: East Midlands
- Country: England
- Sovereign state: United Kingdom
- Post town: STAMFORD
- Postcode district: PE9
- Dialling code: 01780
- Police: Leicestershire
- Fire: Leicestershire
- Ambulance: East Midlands
- UK Parliament: Rutland and Stamford

Pickworth is a civil parish and small village in the county of Rutland. The population of the civil parish at the 2001 census was 81. This remained less than 100 at the 2011 census and was included in the town of Stamford.

The village's name means 'enclosure of Pica'.

In the 13th century Pickworth was quite a substantial village, but by the end of the 14th century it was almost non-existent. It now comprises a small parish church, a disused Methodist chapel, a few large houses and a couple of rows of terraced and council houses.

It lies in a landscape characterised by Rutland County Council as the clay woodlands of the Rutland Plateau (a Jurassic limestone plateau). At the southern boundary of the village is a crossroads leading to Great Casterton about three miles (5 km) to the south, the A1 road at Tickencote Warren to the west, Lincolnshire Gate and Castle Bytham to the north and an unmaintained track to Ryhall Heath to the east.

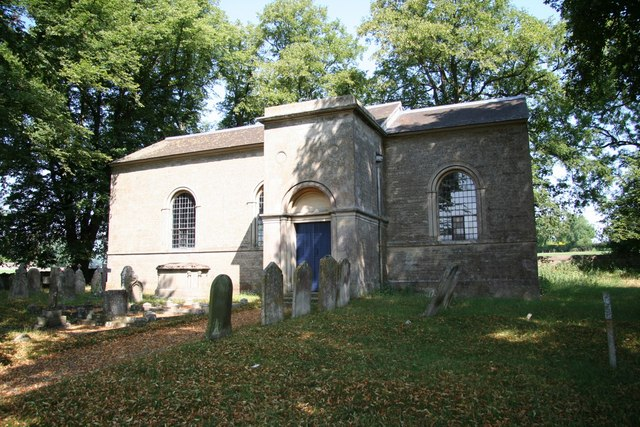
All Saints' Church, Pickworth

All Saints' Church, Pickworth was built in 1821 and lies to the west of the village. The church is a Grade II listed building. Maps previously showed the spire of the demolished church under the name Mockbeggar to the west of the current village site.

The remains of the old medieval village lie mainly to the west of the current village centre in an area referred to as Top Pickworth. The only visible remains, other than earthworks, is a stone arch.

Just to the west of the village lie the remains of a lime kiln. In 1817 this was the workplace of local poet John Clare. About two miles (3 km) south-east is Walk Farm, formerly known as Walkherd Lodge, which was the home of Martha "Patty" Turner, who became John Clare's wife. Both the lime kiln and Walk Farm featured in a television documentary that was made about the poet in the late 1960s.

About two miles (3 km) to the west of the village is the site of the Battle of Losecote Field in 1470. It has been claimed that the village was depopulated as a result of the fighting.

== See also ==
- Clipsham Old Quarry and Pickworth Great Wood (SSSI)
- Newell Wood (SSSI)
