= 2011–12 Logan Cup =

- Administrator: Zimbabwe Cricket
- Cricket format: First-class cricket (4 days)
- Tournament format: League system
- Champions: Matabeleland Tuskers (2nd title)
- Participants: 5
- Matches: 20
- Most runs: 1,093 – Gary Ballance (Mid West Rhinos)
- Most wickets: 45 – Glen Querl (Matabeleland Tuskers)

The 2011–12 Logan Cup was a first-class cricket competition held in Zimbabwe from 26 September 2011 to 16 February 2012. The tournament was won by the Matabeleland Tuskers, who claimed their second consecutive title, becoming the first team to win back-to-back championships during the franchise era of the competition. The competition was altered from the previous two seasons; during the group stage, each team played eight matches, rather than the twelve played previously; and rather than the title being decided by a final, the winner of the league won the tournament.

The Tuskers won their first three matches, including a repeat of the previous season's final against the Mountaineers. They drew their next two matches, but further wins against Southern Rocks and Mashonaland Eagles meant that they won the competition with a match to spare. The Tuskers' head coach, Dave Houghton, praised his team's bowling during the season; citing the number of matches in which they won by an innings.

Gary Ballance, a Zimbabwe-born batsman who plays English county cricket for Yorkshire, finished the competition as the leading run-scorer, accumulating 1,093 runs. Ballance, who appeared in the tournament for the Mid West Rhinos, scored six centuries, including a tournament high-score of 210. The leading wicket-taker was Glen Querl, who made his first-class debut in the competition, on which he claimed nine wickets in the match. He finished the tournament with 45 wickets at a bowling average of 12.86.

== Points table ==
Team	Pld	W	L	D	T	A	Pts
Matabeleland Tuskers	8	5	1	2	0	0	36
Mashonaland Eagles	8	4	2	2	0	0	27
Mid West Rhinos	8	3	1	4	0	0	24
Mountaineers	8	2	3	3	0	0	15
Southern Rocks	8	0	7	1	0	0	1
Source:ESPNcricinfo
