= David Rutherford (cricketer) =

English cricketer

Personal information
- Full name: David John Rutherford
- Born: 6 April 1976 (age 50); Ashington, Northumberland, England
- Batting: Left-handed
- Bowling: Right-arm fast-medium

Domestic team information
- Years: Team
- 1996–present: Northumberland

Career statistics
Competition	List A
Matches	7
Runs scored	40
Batting average	10.00
100s/50s	–/–
Top score	14*
Balls bowled	360
Wickets	4
Bowling average	68.25
5 wickets in innings	–
10 wickets in match	–
Best bowling	2/33
Catches/stumpings	1/–
- Source: Cricinfo, 19 May 2011

David John Rutherford (born 6 April 1976) is an English cricketer. Rutherford is a left-handed batsman who bowls right-arm fast-medium. He was born in Ashington, Northumberland.

Rutherford made his debut for Northumberland in the 1996 Minor Counties Championship against Buckinghamshire. Rutherford has played Minor counties cricket for Northumberland from 1996 to present, which has included 73 Minor Counties Championship matches and 48 MCCA Knockout Trophy matches. He made his List A debut against Ireland in the 1999 NatWest Trophy. He played 6 further List A matches, the last coming against Leicestershire in the 2003 Cheltenham & Gloucester Trophy. In his 7 List A matches, he scored 40 runs at a batting average of 10.00, with a high score of 14*. With the ball he took 4 wickets at a bowling average of 68.25, with best figures of 2/33.

He also played Second XI cricket for the Durham Second XI and the Northamptonshire Second XI.
