= Richard Claridge =

English Anglican priest and Quaker convert

Richard Claridge (1649 – 28 April 1723) was an English Anglican priest and Quaker convert.

== Life ==
The son of William Claridge of Farnborough, Warwickshire, he was educated at Farnborough grammar school. In 1666 he became a student at Balliol College, Oxford, moving two years later to St. Mary Hall. While at the university he gained the reputation of being an "orator, philosopher, and Grecian". He graduated B.A. in 1670, and in the same year was ordained a deacon, being licensed to the curacy of Wardington.

Two years later Claridge was ordained priest, and in the following year was presented to the living of Peopleton in Worcestershire. He was there for nearly twenty years, and most of the time kept a grammar school. In 1689 a sermon by Richard Baxter made him dissatisfied with episcopacy, and a visit to London, during which he attended nonconformist services and inquired into church customs, increased this distaste; but he retained his living till 1691. Joseph Besse, his biographer, states that he then became a Baptist.

In 1692 Claridge was appointed preacher at the Bagnio, a Baptist meeting-house in Newgate Street, London, and shortly afterwards opened a school in Clerkenwell. Two years later, becoming dissatisfied with Baptist doctrines, he resigned his appointment, and in 1696 joined the Society of Friends, being accepted a minister during the following year. In 1701 he disputed with Benjamin Keach in a coffee house, Christopher Meidel supporting him on the Quaker side. In 1702, while a schoolmaster at Barking, he opposed a church rate and was excused from paying it; but for the next collection his goods were distrained.

In 1707 Claridge moved to Tottenham and opened a school, shortly after which an ecclesiastical suit was begun against him for keeping a school without a license. The prosecution was dropped, only to start up a few years later (1708), when a verdict was given against him for £600, he appealed to the court of king's bench, and the fine reduced to £4. During the same year his goods were distrained for tithes. In 1714, when a bill was before parliament to prevent the growth of schism, particularly intended to suppress dissenting academies, Claridge opposed it and wrote tracts to show that it would be oppressive. When the bill became law, however, he made the declaration it required.

For the rest of his life Claridge was mainly involved with the affairs of the Society of Friends. He died of a rapid decline in his 74th year, and was buried in the Quaker burial-ground at Bunhill Fields.

== Works ==
Claridge's major works were:

- A Defence of the present Government under King William and Queen Mary, 1689.
- A Second Defence of the present Government, 1689.
- A Looking-glass for Religious Princes, 1691. These were written while he was rector of Peopleton.
- The Sandy Foundation of Infant Baptism shaken, or an answer to a Book entituled "Vindicæ Fœderis," 1695. Written while he was a Baptist; the further works belong to the period during which he was a Quaker.
- Mercy covering the Judgment-seat and Life and Light triumphing over Death and Darkness, 1700.
- Lux Evangelica attestata, or a further Testimony to the sufficiency of the Light within, 1701.
- Melius Inquirendum, or an answer to a Book of Edward Cockson. M.A., and Rector, as he styles himself of Westcot Barton, 1706.
- The Novelty and Nullity of Dissatisfaction, or the Solemn Affirmation defended, 1714 (reprinted with alterations 1715).
- Tractatus Hierographicus, or a Treatise of the Holy Scriptures, 1724.
- A Plea for Mechanick Preachers, shewing, first, that the following of a Secular Trade or Employment is consistent with the office of a gospel Minister; secondly, that Human Learning is no essential qualification for that service, 1727.

Claridge answered Richard Allen's A Brief Vindication from Dr. Russel's Animadversions (1696) for William Russel, and wrote an epistle for The Enormous Sin of Covetousness Detected (1708) by William Crouch His posthumous works were collected and published with a memoir prefixed in 1726 under the title of The Life and Posthumous Works of Richard Claridge, being memoirs and manuscripts relating to his experiences and progress in religion: his changes of opinion and reasons for them.

== Notes ==
Attribution

This article incorporates text from a publication now in the public domain: Stephen, Leslie, ed. (1887). "Claridge, Richard". Dictionary of National Biography. Vol. 10. London: Smith, Elder & Co.
