= Anne Docwra =

British Quaker minister, writer and philanthropist (1624-1710)

- Born: Anne Waldegrave; 1624; Bures, England
- Died: 1710 (aged 85–86)
- Known for: Writing
- Spouse: James Docwra

Anne Docwra born Anne Waldegrave (1624 – 1710) was a Quaker minister, religious writer and philanthropist.

== Life ==
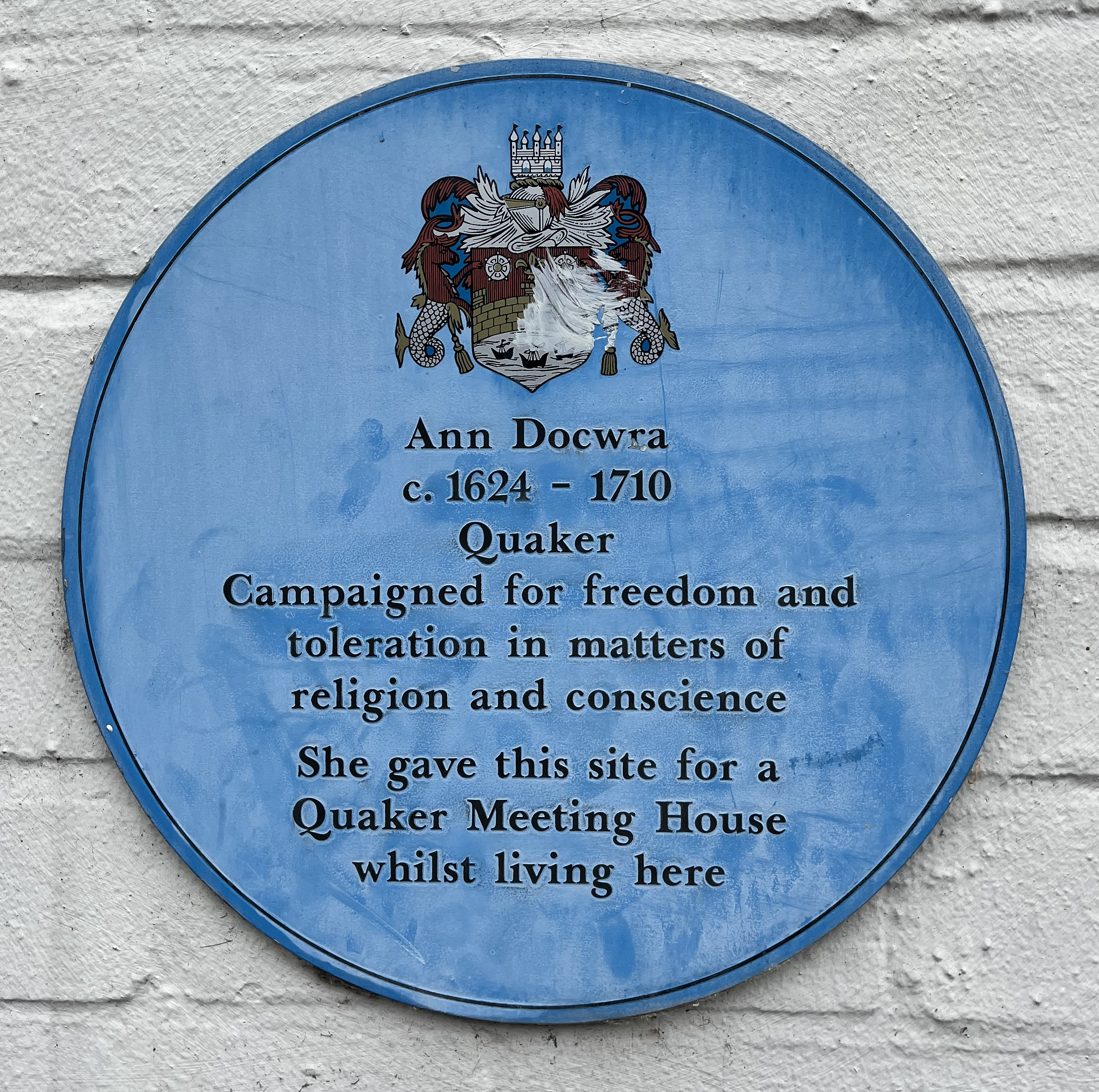
Ann Docwra (1624 – 1710) - Blue Plaque at 12 Jesus Lane, Cambridge

Docwra was born in Bures in 1624. Her father was William Waldegrave and her grandfather was Sir William Waldegrave. Her family were Royalist and well connected. Her father was a Justice of the Peace and when he found her reading a book that he thought lightweight he encouraged her to learn by reading books about the law.

She married James Docwra, who died in 1672. She was a Quaker minister and Quakers in Cambridge met at her house from 1672. In 1680 she gave the Quakers a 1,000 year lease on a yard in Jesus Lane in Cambridge. Jesus Lane Local Quaker Meeting still meets at the meeting house there, which traces its foundation back to 1650. However the current building dates, in part, to 1777 as the meeting house has been rebuilt several times.

Docwra wrote several tracts on the subject of religious toleration, including A looking-glass for the recorder and justices of the peace and grand juries for the town and county of Cambridge (1682). She was involved in controversies within the Quaker movement about organisational structure, and opposed the establishment of separate men's and women's meetings for church affairs.

Francis Bugg, her nephew and a former Quaker, conducted a long and bitter dispute with leading figures of the Quaker movement, including Docwra.

Docwra died on 14 September 1710.
