= Stephen Lishman =

English cricketer

Stephen Geoffrey Lishman (born 21 March 1960) was an English cricketer. He was a right-handed batsman and a right-arm medium-fast bowler who played for Northumberland. He was born in Corbridge.

Lishman played for Northumberland between 1980 and 1989, having picked up a single appearance for Sussex Second XI in 1980. He made his only List A appearance in the 1984 NatWest Trophy, against Middlesex. He took two wickets in the match, those of Test cricketers Wilf Slack and Roland Butcher.

Lishman played for Tynedale between 1998 and 2000.
