= Joseph Besse =

English Quaker controversialist (c. 1683–1757)

Joseph Besse (c. 1683–1757) was an English Quaker controversialist. He quantified the sufferings and persecution undergone by the Quakers.

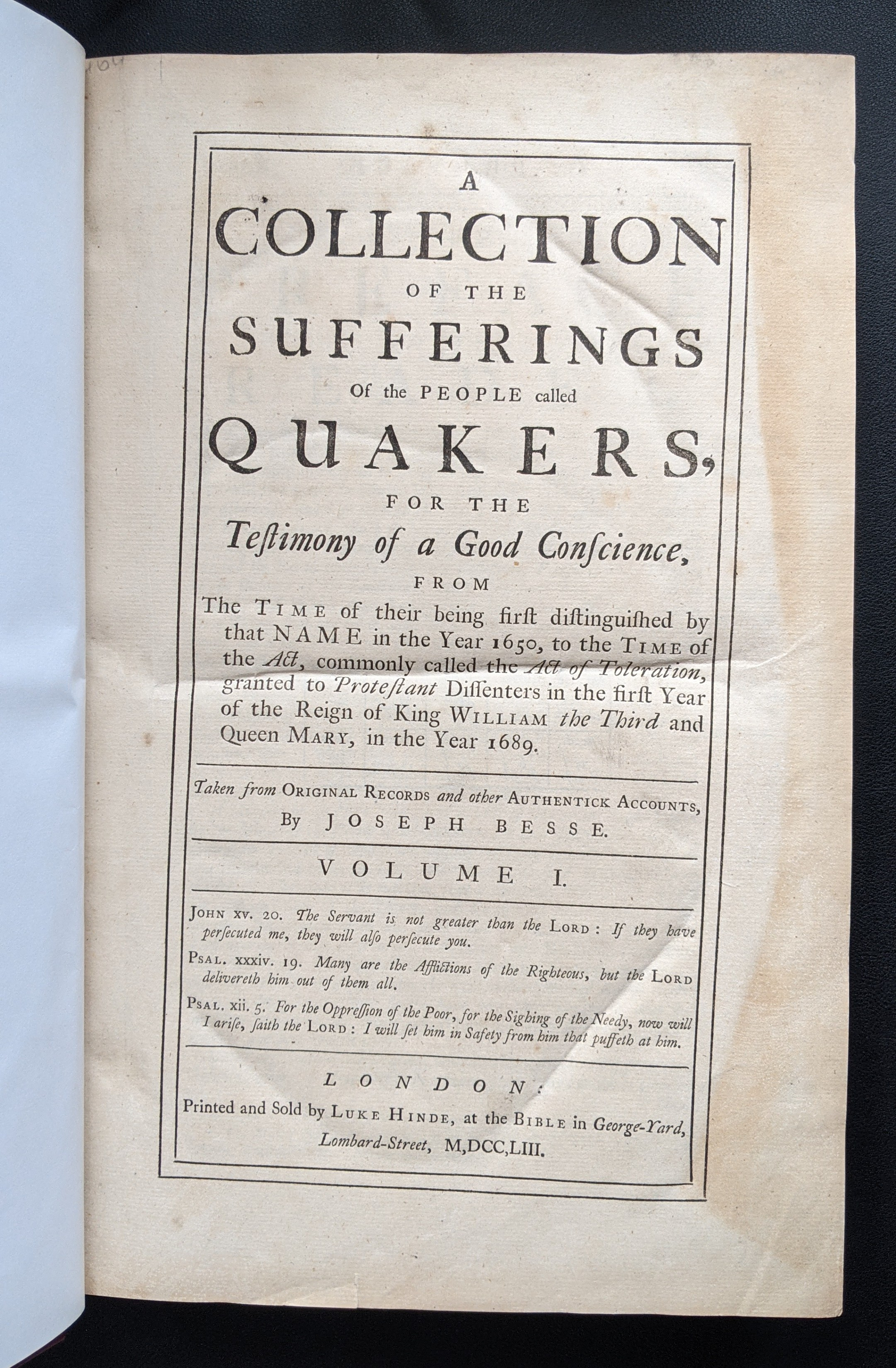
Title page of Besse's Collection of Sufferings

== Biography ==
Besse was born about 1683 and lived in Colchester, where he was a writing master. There he married on 9 October 1716 Hannah Dehorne, who died in Chelmsford. Besse then moved to Ratcliff, now part of east London, where he died on 25 November 1757 and was buried in the Friends' burial ground. His son of the same name emigrated to Pennsylvania. Besse was a convert to the Quakers from the Anglican Church, in which he had refused a living worth 400 shillings a year.

== Works ==
Besse was a vigorous controversialist. Various works of his have been edited by William Sewel, Richard Claridge, Henton Brown, Isaac Penington, and Samuel Bownas. His main books and tracts were:

- Carmen Spirituale . . . olim a Richardo Claridge Anglice compositum et editum et nunc Latine versum ab J. B., London, 1728
- A Cloud of Witnesses proving that the Bishop of Lichfield and Coventry hath misrepresented the Quakers (signed J. B.), London, 1732
- A Defence of Quakerism, London, 1732
- Abstract of the Sufferings of the People call'd Quakers, London, vol. i. 1733, vols. ii. and iii. 1738 (not an abridgment of the Sufferings mentioned below)
- The Protestant Flail (anonymous book on baptism), London, 1735
- A Brief Account of many of the Prosecutions of the People call'd Quakers for Tithes, Church-rates, &c. (anon.), London, 1736
- A Collection of the Sufferings of the People called Quakers, for the Testimony of a Good Conscience, from 1650 to 1689, London, 1753, 2 vols, folio. Among those mentioned is Barbara Blaugdone as "a Woman of good Parts and Education".
- The Universality of the Love of God to Mankind, London, 1755
- Some Scriptural Observations on (1) the Spirituality of Gospel-worship; (2) the Nature of true Christian Prayer; (3) Our Saviour's Direction concerning Fasting, London, 1756

His prime work is the Sufferings of the Quakers, a laborious compilation of cases of persecution against Quakers, arranged by British counties, followed by New England, Barbados, Nevis, Bermudas, Antigua, Maryland, Jamaica, Europe and Asia, Isle of Malta, Hungary and Austria, Danzig, Hamburg, Germany, Ireland and Scotland.

In 1746, Besse edited and published a work by Penington, which he entitled The Doctrine of the People called Quakers, in relation to bearing arms and fighting; extracted from the Works of a Learned and Approved Writer of that Persuasion. This defended Quaker beliefs on pacifism, reacting to anonymous writings by Richard Finch.
