= David Borthwick (cricketer) =

English cricketer

Personal information
- Full name: David Borthwick
- Born: 2 February 1963 (age 63); Sunderland, County Durham, England
- Batting: Right-handed
- Bowling: Wicket-keeper
- Relatives: Scott Borthwick (nephew)

Domestic team information
- Years: Team
- 1994–1996: Northumberland

Career statistics
Competition	List A
Matches	1
Runs scored	0
Batting average	0.00
100s/50s	–/–
Top score	0
Balls bowled	–
Wickets	–
Bowling average	–
5 wickets in innings	–
10 wickets in match	–
Best bowling	–
Catches/stumpings	–/–
- Source: Cricinfo, 17 May 2011

David Borthwick (born 2 February 1963) is a former English cricketer. Borthwick was a right-handed batsman who fielded as a wicket-keeper. He was born in Sunderland, County Durham.

Borthwick made his debut for Northumberland in the 1994 MCCA Knockout Trophy against the Cheshire. Borthwick played Minor counties cricket for Northumberland from 1994 to 1996, which included 25 Minor Counties Championship matches and 4 MCCA Knockout Trophy matches. He made his only List A appearance against Nottinghamshire in the 1994 NatWest Trophy. In this match he was dismissed for a duck by Andy Pick.

He also played Second XI cricket for the Nottinghamshire Second XI and the Northamptonshire Second XI. His nephew, Scott, plays first-class cricket for Durham.
