= Northumberland County Cricket Club =

English Cricket Club

Team information
- Founded: 1895
- Home ground: Osborne Avenue, Jesmond

History
- MCCC wins: 0
- MCCAT wins: 1
- FP Trophy wins: 0
- Official website: Northumberland County Cricket Club

Northumberland County Cricket Club is one of twenty minor county clubs within the domestic cricket structure of England, and Wales. It represents the historic county of Northumberland.

The team is currently a member of the Minor Counties Championship Eastern Division and plays in the MCCA Knockout Trophy. Northumberland played List A matches occasionally from 1971 until 2005, but is not classified as a List A team per se.

The club is based at Osborne Avenue, Jesmond and also plays matches around the county at Benwell Park and at the South Northumberland CC ground at Gosforth.

== Honours ==
- Minor Counties Championship (0) – ; shared (0) –
- MCCA Knockout Trophy (1) – 2006

== Earliest cricket ==
Cricket probably reached Northumberland during the 18th century. According to Bowen, the earliest reference to cricket in the county was in 1766.

== Origin of club ==
A county organisation existed in 1834. The present Northumberland CCC was founded in December 1895 and joined the Minor Counties Championship in the second season of the competition, 1896. It has remained there ever since with the exception of 1898, when it did not compete.

== Club history ==
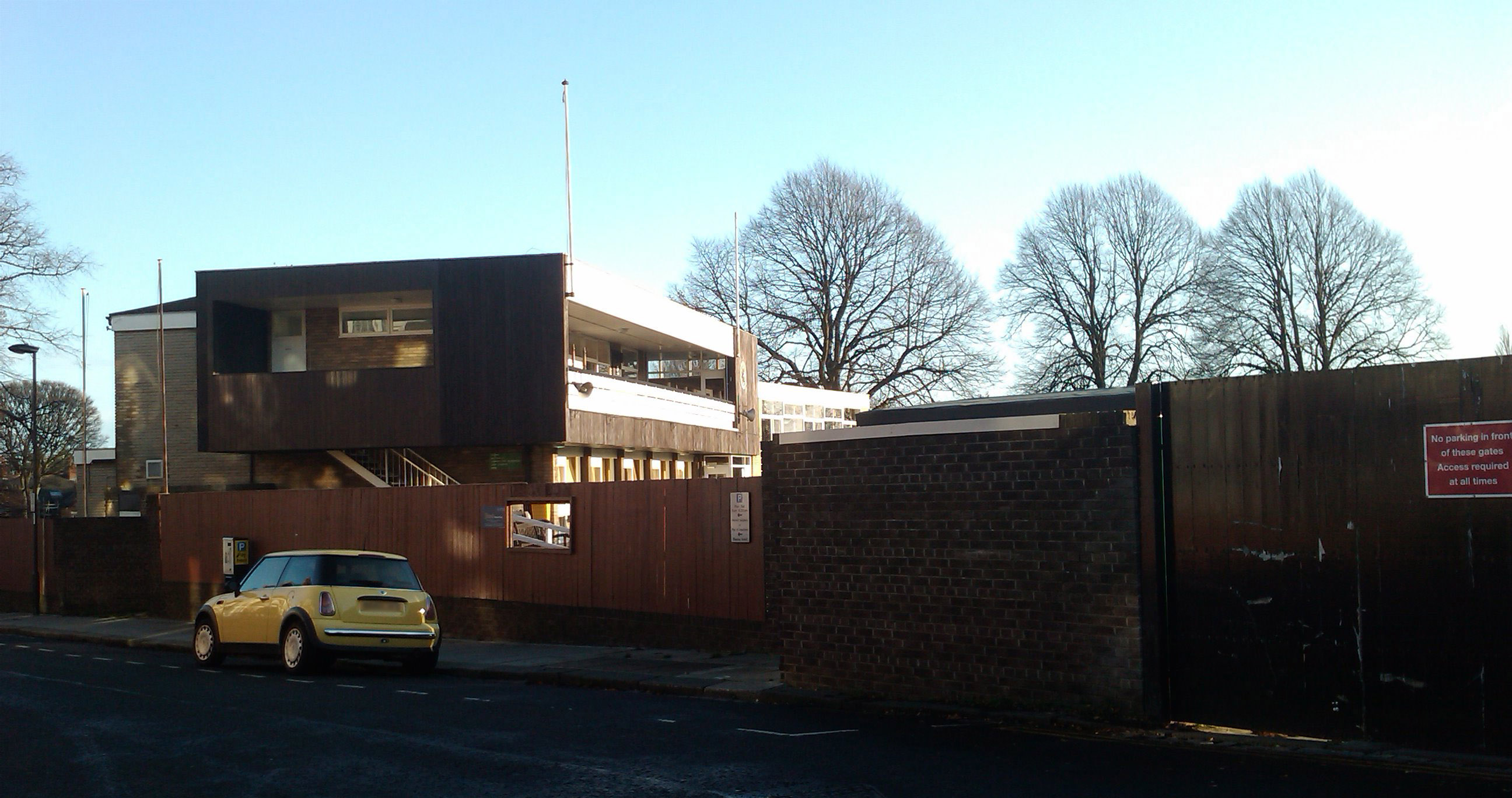
The view from the street outside of one of the club's venues, Osborne Avenue, Jesmond.

Northumberland has never won the Minor Counties Championship.

Northumberland won the MCCA Knockout Trophy for the first time in August 2006, beating Dorset in the final.

== Notable players ==
The following Northumberland cricketers made an impact on the first-class game:

- Leslie Townsend
- Stan Worthington
- Eddie Phillipson
- Colin Atkinson
- Jack van Geloven
- Norman Graham
- Ben Harmison
- Mark Wood

For a complete list of players who appeared in List A cricket for Northumberland, see List of Northumberland CCC List A players.
