= Australian cricket team in India in 2026–27 =

International cricket tour

	India	Australia
- Dates: 21 January – 3 March 2027

Test series

The Australian cricket team is scheduled to tour India between January and March 2027 to play the India cricket team. The tour will consist of five Test matches, which will form part of the 2025–2027 ICC World Test Championship. In March 2026, the Board of Control for Cricket in India (BCCI) confirmed the fixtures for the tour, as a part of the 2026–27 home international season.

It is Australia's first Test tour since 2022–23.

== Venues ==
The venues for the Test series were announced in March 2026 following the BCCI's release of India's home schedule for the 2026/27 season. The venues were noted for being non-traditional Test venues for the Indian team. Chennai's M. A. Chidambaram Stadium had not hosted a Test since 2024, and Australia had not played a Test at the venue since 2013. Guwahati's Assam Cricket Association Stadium had only hosted one Test match since its opening in 2012, and JSCA International Stadium Complex in Ranchi had hosted a total of three Tests sine its first in 2017.

Ahmedabad	Chennai	Nagpur	
Narendra Modi Stadium	M. A. Chidambaram Stadium	Vidarbha Cricket Association Stadium	
Capacity: 100,000	Capacity: 38,200	Capacity: 45,000	
			Guwahati
Assam Cricket Association Stadium
Capacity: 46,000
Ranchi
JSCA International Stadium Complex
Capacity: 40,000

== Test series ==
=== 1st Test ===
21–25 January 2027
Scorecard

India	v	Australia

Vidarbha Cricket Association Stadium, Nagpur

=== 2nd Test ===
29 January – 2 February 2027
Scorecard

India	v	Australia

M. A. Chidambaram Stadium, Chennai

=== 3rd Test ===
11–15 February 2027
Scorecard

India	v	Australia

Assam Cricket Association Stadium, Guwahati

=== 4th Test ===
19–23 February 2027
Scorecard

India	v	Australia

JSCA International Stadium, Ranchi

=== 5th Test ===
27 February – 3 March 2027
Scorecard

India	v	Australia

Narendra Modi Stadium, Ahmedabad
