= Australian cricket team in India in 2023 =

The Australian cricket team in India in 2023 may refer to two different tours:

- Australian cricket team in India in 2022–23
- Australian cricket team in India in 2023–24
