= Australian cricket team in India in 2022–23 (February–March 2023) =

International cricket tour

	India	Australia
- Dates: 20 September 2022 – 22 March 2023
Captains	Rohit Sharma (Note: Hardik Pandya captained India in the first ODI.)	Pat Cummins (Note: Steve Smith captained Australia in the third and fourth Tests.) (Tests); Steve Smith (ODIs); Aaron Finch (T20Is)

Test series
- Result: India won the 4-match series 2–1
Most runs	Virat Kohli (297)	Usman Khawaja (333)
Most wickets	Ravichandran Ashwin (25)	Nathan Lyon (22)
- Player of the series: Ravichandran Ashwin (Ind); Ravindra Jadeja (Ind)

One Day International series
- Results: Australia won the 3-match series 2–1
Most runs	K. L. Rahul (116)	Mitchell Marsh (194)
Most wickets	Mohammad Siraj (5)	Mitchell Starc (8)
- Player of the series: Mitchell Marsh (Aus)

The Australian cricket team toured India in February and March 2023 to play four Test and three One Day International (ODI) matches. The Test matches formed part of the 2021–2023 ICC World Test Championship.

India won the Test series 2–1, and retained the Border–Gavaskar Trophy. Australia's win in the third Test secured their place in the World Test Championship final. Results in other matches confirmed that India also qualified for the Championship final after the drawn fourth Test.

India won the first ODI by 5 wickets, to lead the series 1–0. But Australia won the second ODI by 10 wickets, to level the series 1–1. Australia won the third ODI by 21 runs and won the series 2–1.

Prime Minister of India Narendra Modi hosted his counterpart Prime Minister of Australia Anthony Albanese at Narendra Modi stadium on the first day of the fourth test at the 75 Years of Friendship through Cricket Event. The event was organized as a tribute to the 75 years of diplomatic and cricket relations between two the countries. The two PMs visited the "Hall of fame" museum inside the stadium.

== Scheduling ==
On 8 December 2022, the Board of Control for Cricket in India (BCCI) confirmed the schedule for the Tests and the ODIs.

On 13 February 2023, the BCCI confirmed the venue of third test was shifted from Dharamshala to Indore. The ground was rated "poor" by the International Cricket Council (ICC) and received three demerit points. However, on 27 March 2023, the ICC changed the rating to "below average", and the ground received one demerit point, after an appeal by the BCCI.

== Squads ==
Tests		ODIs	
India	Australia	India	Australia
Rohit Sharma (c); K. L. Rahul (vc) (Note: KL Rahul was the vice-captain for the first two Tests while Pujara was the vice-captain for the last two Tests.); Cheteshwar Pujara (vc); Ravichandran Ashwin; K. S. Bharat (wk); Shubman Gill; Shreyas Iyer; Ravindra Jadeja; Ishan Kishan (wk); Virat Kohli; Axar Patel; Mohammed Shami; Mohammed Siraj; Jaydev Unadkat; Kuldeep Yadav; Suryakumar Yadav; Umesh Yadav	Pat Cummins (c); Steve Smith (vc); Ashton Agar; Scott Boland; Alex Carey (wk); Cameron Green; Peter Handscomb; ~~Josh Hazlewood~~; Travis Head; Usman Khawaja; Matthew Kuhnemann; Marnus Labuschagne; Nathan Lyon; Lance Morris; Todd Murphy; Matt Renshaw; Mitchell Starc; Mitchell Swepson; David Warner	Rohit Sharma (c); Hardik Pandya (vc); Yuzvendra Chahal; Shubman Gill; ~~Shreyas Iyer~~; Ravindra Jadeja; Ishan Kishan (wk); Virat Kohli; Umran Malik; Axar Patel; K. L. Rahul (wk); Mohammad Shami; Mohammed Siraj; Washington Sundar; Shardul Thakur; Jaydev Unadkat; Kuldeep Yadav; Suryakumar Yadav	Steve Smith (c); ~~Pat Cummins (c)~~; Sean Abbott; Ashton Agar; Alex Carey (wk); Nathan Ellis; Cameron Green; Travis Head; Josh Inglis (wk); Marnus Labuschagne; Mitchell Marsh; Glenn Maxwell; ~~Jhye Richardson~~; Mitchell Starc; Marcus Stoinis; David Warner; Adam Zampa

On 10 January 2023, Mitchell Starc was ruled out of the first Test against India due to finger injury. On 1 February 2023, Shreyas Iyer was ruled out of the first Test against Australia due to back injury. On 5 February 2023, Josh Hazlewood was ruled out of the first Test against India due to achilles niggle in his left leg. On 7 February 2023, Cameron Green was ruled out of the first Test against India due to fractured finger. Ahead of the second Test, Matthew Kuhnemann replaced Mitchell Swepson in Australia's squad. On 12 February 2023, Jaydev Unadkat was released from India's squad for second Test, to play Ranji Trophy Final. On 20 February 2023, Australia's Josh Hazlewood was ruled out of Test series. Mitchell Swepson re-joined the squad prior to the third Test. On 21 February 2023, Australia's David Warner was ruled out of the last two Tests due to elbow injury. On 22 February 2023, Ashton Agar was released from Australia's squad for last two Tests, to play Sheffield Shield and Marsh One-Day Cup. Pat Cummins was unavailable for the last two Tests due to a family emergency, with Steve Smith named as captain.

On 19 February 2023, BCCI confirmed that Rohit Sharma would be unavailable for the first ODI due to family commitments, with Hardik Pandya named as the captain in his place. On 6 March 2023, Australia's Jhye Richardson was ruled out from the ODI series due to a hamstring injury, with Nathan Ellis named as his replacement. On 14 March 2023, Pat Cummins left the ODI squad due to family problems, with Steve Smith named as the captain in his absence. On 14 March 2023, Shreyas Iyer was ruled out of the ODI series due to recurrence of back injury.

== Test series ==
=== 1st Test ===
9–13 February 2023 (Note: While five days of play were scheduled for each Test, the first three tests reached a result in three days.)
Scorecard

Australia	v	India
177 (63.5 overs); Marnus Labuschagne 49 (123); Ravindra Jadeja 5/47 (22 overs)		400 (139.3 overs); Rohit Sharma 120 (212); Todd Murphy 7/124 (47 overs)
91 (32.3 overs); Steve Smith 25* (51); Ravichandran Ashwin 5/37 (12 overs)

India won by an innings and 132 runs
Vidarbha Cricket Association Stadium, Nagpur
Umpires: Richard Illingworth (Eng) and Nitin Menon (Ind)
Player of the match: Ravindra Jadeja (Ind)

- Australia won the toss and elected to bat.
- K. S. Bharat, Suryakumar Yadav (Ind) and Todd Murphy (Aus) all made their Test debuts.
- Todd Murphy (Aus) took his first five-wicket haul in Tests, and had the sixth-best innings figures for an Australian on debut.
- Ravichandran Ashwin (Ind) became the second-fastest bowler, in terms of matches, to take 450 wickets in Tests (89). Ashwin also claimed his 25th five wicket haul in India, joint highest (with Anil Kumble) by anyone in India.
- The score of 91 was Australia's lowest Test total in India. Ten Australian batsmen were given out LBW in this match, also a new record for Australia.
- World Test Championship points: India 12, Australia 0.

With the pitch seeming likely to favour spinners, India played three spinners, while Australia played two, giving Murphy his debut. Australia also dropped Head, in a decision which was widely criticised in Australia, replacing him with Handscomb. So the Indian team was Sharma, Rahul, Pujara, Kohli, Suryakumar Yadav (batters), Bharat (wicket-keeper), Ashwin, Jadeja, Patel (spin bowlers), Shami and Siraj (fast bowlers); and the Australian team was Khawaja, Warner, Labuschagne, Smith, Handscomb, Renshaw (batters), Carey (wicket-keeper), Lyon, Murphy (spin bowlers), Cummins and Boland (fast bowlers).

Despite a modest first-innings total of 177, Australia's position looked reasonable when India were 168 for 5, despite Sharma going on to make 120. But Jadeja (70) and Patel (84) gave India a large lead. The Australia were then bowled out in their second innings for 91, appearing to have no answer to India's spinners, who took 16 wickets between them for the match.

=== 2nd Test ===
17–21 February 2023
Scorecard

Australia	v	India
263 (78.4 overs); Usman Khawaja 81 (125); Mohammed Shami 4/60 (14.4 overs)		262 (83.3 overs); Axar Patel 74 (115); Nathan Lyon 5/67 (29 overs)
113 (31.1 overs); Travis Head 43 (46); Ravindra Jadeja 7/42 (12.1 overs)		118/4 (26.4 overs); Rohit Sharma 31 (20); Nathan Lyon 2/49 (12 overs)

India won by 6 wickets
Arun Jaitley Cricket Stadium, Delhi
Umpires: Michael Gough (Eng) and Nitin Menon (Ind)
Player of the match: Ravindra Jadeja (Ind)

- Australia won the toss and elected to bat.
- Matthew Kuhnemann (Aus) made his Test debut.
- Cheteshwar Pujara (Ind) played in his 100th Test. He became the second Indian to be dismissed for a duck in his 100th Test match.
- David Warner was replaced on day 2 by Matt Renshaw after suffering a concussion on the previous day, during Australia's batting innings.
- 7/42 was a career best bowling performance by Ravindra Jadeja. Jadeja dismissed five batsmen bowled in the second innings. This happened in Test cricket after a gap of more than 20 years, with Shoaib Akhtar being the last bowler to do so in 2002.
- Ravichandran Ashwin and Nathan Lyon completed 100 Test wickets against Australia and India respectively.
- Virat Kohli became the fastest (in terms of innings) to complete 25,000 runs in international cricket.
- World Test Championship points: India 12, Australia 0.

=== 3rd Test ===
1–5 March 2023
Scorecard

India	v	Australia
109 (33.2 overs); Virat Kohli 22 (52); Matthew Kuhnemann 5/16 (9 overs)		197 (76.3 overs); Usman Khawaja 60 (147); Ravindra Jadeja 4/78 (32 overs)
163 (60.3 overs); Cheteshwar Pujara 59 (142); Nathan Lyon 8/64 (23.3 overs)		78/1 (18.5 overs); Travis Head 49* (53); Ravichandran Ashwin 1/44 (9.5 overs)

Australia won by 9 wickets
Holkar Stadium, Indore
Umpires: Nitin Menon (Ind) and Joel Wilson (WI)
Player of the match: Nathan Lyon (Aus)

- India won the toss and elected to bat.
- The match was moved from Dharamshala to Indore, as the Himachal Pradesh Cricket Association Stadium was not ready to host international matches due to a lack of sufficient grass coverage.
- Matthew Kuhnemann (Aus) took his first five-wicket haul in Tests.
- This was Australia's first Test win in India since 2017 and the first win by any visiting team in India since 2021.
- As a result of this match, Australia qualified for the 2021–2023 ICC World Test Championship Final.
- World Test Championship points: Australia 12, India 0.

=== 4th Test ===
9–13 March 2023
Scorecard

Australia	v	India
480 (167.2 overs); Usman Khawaja 180 (422); Ravichandran Ashwin 6/91 (47.2 overs)		571 (178.5 overs); Virat Kohli 186 (364); Todd Murphy 3/113 (45.5 overs)
175/2d (78.1 overs); Travis Head 90 (163); Axar Patel 1/36 (19 overs)

Match drawn
Narendra Modi Stadium, Ahmedabad
Umpires: Richard Kettleborough (Eng) and Nitin Menon (Ind)
Player of the match: Virat Kohli (Ind)

- Australia won the toss and elected to bat.
- Cameron Green (Aus) scored his maiden century in Tests.
- Ravichandran Ashwin (Ind) became the leading wicket taker in matches vs Australia, as well as the leading wicket taker in the Border–Gavaskar Trophy, overtaking Nathan Lyon (Aus), before Lyon regained the top spot in the same match.
- Cheteshwar Pujara (Ind) became the fourth batsman, to score 2,000 runs against a single team in Tests.
- Rohit Sharma (Ind) scored his 17,000th run in international cricket, being the 6th Indian cricketer to do so.
- Virat Kohli (Ind) became the second Indian to take 300 catches in International cricket. Kohli also scored 4,000 Test runs in India and became the fifth cricketer to achieve this feat.
- Axar Patel became the fastest bowler for India to take fifty test wickets, in terms of balls bowled (2205).
- World Test Championship points: India 4, Australia 4.

== ODI series ==
=== 1st ODI ===
17 March 2023
13:30 (D/N)
Scorecard

Australia; 188 (35.4 overs)	v	India; 191/5 (39.5 overs)
Mitchell Marsh 81 (65); Mohammed Shami 3/17 (6 overs)		K. L. Rahul 75* (91); Mitchell Starc 3/49 (9.5 overs)

India won by 5 wickets
Wankhede Stadium, Mumbai
Umpires: K. N. Ananthapadmanabhan (Ind) and Nitin Menon (Ind)
Player of the match: Ravindra Jadeja (Ind)

- India won the toss and elected to field.
- Hardik Pandya captained India for the first time in ODIs.

=== 2nd ODI ===
19 March 2023
13:30 (D/N)
Scorecard

India; 117 (26 overs)	v	Australia; 121/0 (11 overs)
Virat Kohli 31 (35); Mitchell Starc 5/53 (8 overs)		Mitchell Marsh 66* (36)

Australia won by 10 wickets
ACA–VDCA Cricket Stadium, Visakhapatnam
Umpires: Nitin Menon (Ind) and Virender Sharma (Ind)
Player of the match: Mitchell Starc (Aus)

- Australia won the toss and elected to field.
- This was India's biggest defeat in ODIs, in terms of balls remaining (234).
- This was Mitchell Starc's ninth five-wicket haul in ODIs, the equal highest by an Australian.

=== 3rd ODI ===
22 March 2023
13:30 (D/N)
Scorecard

Australia; 269 (49 overs)	v	India; 248 (49.1 overs)
Mitchell Marsh 47 (97); Hardik Pandya 3/44 (8 overs)		Virat Kohli 54 (72); Adam Zampa 4/45 (10 overs)

Australia won by 21 runs
M. A. Chidambaram Stadium, Chennai
Umpires: Jayaraman Madanagopal (Ind) and Nitin Menon (Ind)
Player of the match: Adam Zampa (Aus)

- Australia won the toss and elected to bat.
- Suryakumar Yadav became the first Indian batter to get a golden duck in three consecutive ODI matches.
