= Indian cricket team in Australia in 2014–15 =

International cricket tour

2014–15 Border–Gavaskar Trophy
- Date: 24 November 2014 – 10 January 2015
- Location: Australia
- Result: Australia won the 4-match series 2–0
- Player of the series: (Australia) Steve Smith
Teams
- Australia: India
Captains
- Michael Clarke (Note: Steve Smith captained Australia for the last three Test matches.): MS Dhoni (Note: Virat Kohli captained India for the 1st and 4th Test.)
Most runs
- Steve Smith (769): Virat Kohli (692)
Most wickets
- Nathan Lyon (23): Mohammed Shami (15)

The Indian cricket team toured Australia from 24 November 2014 to 10 January 2015. The tour consisted of two tour matches and four Test matches. The first Test was originally scheduled on 4 December in Brisbane, but it was postponed because of the death of Phillip Hughes to allow the Australian players to mourn at his funeral. Instead, Adelaide hosted the first Test from 9 December and Brisbane hosted the second Test from 17 December. Following the draw in the third Test, Indian captain MS Dhoni announced his retirement from Test cricket with immediate effect. After the draw in the final Test in Sydney, Australia won the series 2–0. Following the Test matches, Australia and India participated in the Carlton Mid Triangular Series with the England cricket team.

== Background ==
India had recently lost a Test series against England in England 3–1, while Australia lost a Test series against Pakistan in the United Arab Emirates 2–0.

== Squads ==
Indian selectors selected a 19-man squad for the Test series. Naman Ojha was included as the backup for Wriddhiman Saha in the first Test. MS Dhoni was not part of the team in the first Adelaide Test due to an injury. Therefore, Virat Kohli captained India in the first Test. Dhawal Kulkarni was asked to join India's Test squad as cover for the injured Bhuvneshwar Kumar, who was suffering from an ankle injury. Indian captain MS Dhoni announced his retirement after the conclusion of the Melbourne Test, with Kohli leading the team in the fourth Test as well.

On the other hand, the Australian selectors selected 13 members for the first Test. Australian Test captain Michael Clarke had to pass a fitness test before appearing in the first Test match at Adelaide. Shaun Marsh was added to the Australian squad as cover for Michael Clarke. But Clarke had taken no further part in the series after injuring his right hamstring. Thereby, Steve Smith was selected as standby captain for the 2nd to 4th Tests ahead of vice captain Brad Haddin. Queenslander Joe Burns replaced an injured Mitchell Marsh for the Boxing Day Test. Ashton Agar was added to the squad for the last Test.

Tests
| Australia | India |
|---|---|
| Michael Clarke (c); Brad Haddin (wk); Ashton Agar; Joe Burns; Ryan Harris; Josh Hazlewood; Mitchell Johnson; Nathan Lyon; Mitchell Marsh; Shaun Marsh; Chris Rogers; Peter Siddle; Steve Smith (vc); Mitchell Starc; David Warner; Shane Watson; Marnus Labuschagne | MS Dhoni (c, wk); Virat Kohli (vc); Varun Aaron; Ravichandran Ashwin; Shikhar Dhawan; Ravindra Jadeja; Dhawal Kulkarni*; Bhuvneshwar Kumar; Naman Ojha (wk); Axar Patel*; Cheteshwar Pujara; Ajinkya Rahane; KL Rahul; Suresh Raina; Wriddhiman Saha (wk); Mohammed Shami; Rohit Sharma; Karn Sharma; Ishant Sharma; Murali Vijay; Umesh Yadav |

== Tour series ==
24–25 November 2014
Scorecard

| Cricket Australia Invitation XI | v | Indians |
| 219 (71.5 overs); Ryan Carters 58 (151); Varun Aaron 3/80 (18 overs) | | 8/363 (91 overs); Virat Kohli 60 (114); Josh Lalor 2/55 (20 overs) |

Match drawn
Glenelg Oval, Glenelg
Umpires: Damien Mealey (Aus) and Paul Wilson (Aus)

- Cricket Australia Invitation XI won the toss and chose to bat
- Players per side 13 (11 batting, 11 fielding)

4–5 December 2014
Scorecard

| Cricket Australia Invitation XI | v | Indians |
| 243 (68.3 overs); Jordan Silk 58 (104); Varun Aaron 4/41 (14.3 overs) | | 375 (90 overs); Virat Kohli 66 (94); Josh Lalor 4/59 (17 overs) |
| 5/83 (21 overs); Jordan Silk 41 (71); Ishant Sharma 2/8 (5 overs) |

Match drawn
Glenelg Oval, Glenelg
Umpires: Mick Martell (Aus) and Sam Nogajski (Aus)

- Cricket Australia Invitation XI won the toss and elected to bat
- Originally scheduled for 28–29 November but the match was rescheduled because of the death of Australian cricketer Phillip Hughes.
- Players per side: Cricket Australia XI 12 (11 batting, 11 fielding); Indians 14 (11 batting, 11 fielding)

== Test series ==
=== Trophy background ===
Entering the series, India held the Border–Gavaskar Trophy after winning the 2012–13 series 4–0. Australia won the previous series at home, (2011–12) also 4–0.

=== Decision Review System (DRS) ===
The series was played without the players having access to the decision review system (DRS) also known as UDRS. The DRS could be used in any Test series at the agreement of both participating cricket boards, but the Board of Control for Cricket in India opposed its use in this series. Umpires could still initiate reviews to the third umpire for run out, stumping and no ball decisions. Before the first Test, India captain Virat Kohli stated that the system had to be "100% perfect".

=== 1st Test ===
9–13 December 2014
Scorecard

| Australia | v | India |
| 7/517d (120 overs); Steve Smith 162* (231); Mohammed Shami 2/120 (24 overs) | | 444 (116.4 overs); Virat Kohli 115 (184); Nathan Lyon 5/134 (36 overs) |
| 5/290d (69 overs); David Warner 102 (166); Karn Sharma 2/95 (16 overs) | | 315 (87.1 overs); Virat Kohli 141 (175); Nathan Lyon 7/152 (34.1 overs) |

Australia won by 48 runs
Adelaide Oval, Adelaide
Umpires: Marais Erasmus (SA) and Ian Gould (Eng)
Player of the match: Nathan Lyon (Aus)

- Australia won the toss and elected to bat.
- Rain shortened Day 2 to 32 overs.
- Virat Kohli (Ind) captained for the first time in tests.
- Karn Sharma (Ind) made his Test debut.
- Phillip Hughes (Aus) was named as '13th man' in remembrance of his death.

Australia won the toss and chose to bat on a wicket which some commentators suggesting the flattest ever at the Adelaide Oval. David Warner made a blistering start with the score at 0/40 after 4 overs. But Chris Rogers (9) fell shortly after from an edge to Shikhar Dhawan bowled by Ishant Sharma. Shane Watson (14) also fell to Dhawan via an edge. Michael Clarke steadied the innings while Warner scored his 10th century off 106 balls. Clarke (60) eventually retired hurt after a back injury. Karn Sharma took his first Test wicket after David Warner (145) holed out. Australia lost late wickets in the last session, losing 4 wickets to end the day at 6/354 after at one stage being 3/345. Brad Haddin (0) was dismissed on the last ball of the day.

Michael Clarke returned to the crease at the start of Day 2 with a back brace, and put on a 51-run partnership with Steve Smith, before a rain delay left Smith stranded just 2 runs short of a century. The rain consistently fell and lunch was taken early. The players returned after lunch and Smith brought up his century in the first ball. Play was delayed once again just 2 overs later. Play resumed again and Clarke reached his own century as the pair quickly added another 50 before yet another rain delay. Play continued and more quick runs were added as Smith reached 150. Clarke then was dismissed by Karn Sharma for 128 and stumps were called just one over later because of bad light. Shami, Aaron and Karn Sharma took two wickets each.

Australia captain Michael Clarke declared overnight and sent India in to bat at the start of Day 3. Shikhar Dhawan made a brisk start but was bowled by Ryan Harris for 25. Murali Vijay and Cheteshwar Pujara put on an 81-run partnership before Mitchell Johnson dismissed Vijay caught behind (53). India reached lunch at a solid 2/119. Pujara and Kohli continued their partnership after lunch and put on another 81-run stand until Pujara was bowled by Nathan Lyon for 73. Kohli and Ajinkya Rahane saw out a late onslaught from Lyon to be 3/223 at tea. Rahane pushed on after tea, but was caught off his gloves for 62. Rohit Sharma came in and helped push them towards 400 as Kohli brought up his 2nd century at Adelaide Oval. Kohli (115) was eventually dismissed with 4 overs remaining in the day. Wriddhiman Saha and Sharma successfully saw India to 5/369 at stumps.

Australia took the remaining 5 wickets in the first session with Nathan Lyon the pick of the bowlers taking 5/134. The Australian openers got to lunch unscathed, scoring 32 runs off 10 overs. Karn Sharma took the wicket of Chris Rogers (21) after he mis-timed a sweep to Rohit Sharma. David Warner and Shane Watson combined to take Australia to a solid 1/137 at tea, but Warner should have been out after being bowled off a no-ball by Varun Aaron. Warner (102) made his second century of the innings after the break. Australia finished the day at 5/290, after Mitchell Marsh (40) and Steve Smith (52*) scored at a fast rate including a 24-run over from Marsh off Karn Sharma. Commentators criticised India for their negative tactics. Also, controversy ensued twice in the final session when Warner was given a send-off from Aaron causing a dispute between them. Rohit Sharma's appeal also caused a stand-off between the players leaving the umpires, Ian Gould and Marais Erasmus to calm them down. As a result, Warner was fined 15% of his match fee while Kohli and Shikhar Dhawan were fined 30%.

Australia again declared overnight, leaving them 98 overs to bowl out India. Shikhar Dhawan was first to go (9), but shouldn't have been, after replays showed the ball came off his arm. Cheteshwar Pujara (21) was next out when he was caught behind off Nathan Lyon. Murali Vijay and stand-in captain Virat Kohli put on a further 45 as India reached a solid 2/105 at lunch. After lunch the pair extended their partnership to 185, as Kohli brought up his second century of the match and completed 2000 test runs (innings 53), before a devastated Vijay was given lbw for 99. Ajinkya Rahane went in the same over for a duck, caught at bat-pad. Rohit Sharma joined Kohli and they put on 35 before Sharma started a collapse when he went for 6. Wriddhiman Saha was bowled for 13 as Lyon took his second 5-wicket haul of the game. Kohli holed out to Mitchell Marsh eventually for 141 and the remaining 3 wickets fell quickly as Nathan Lyon took 7/152, his maiden 10 wicket match haul and was awarded Man of the Match. India lost their last 8 wickets for only 73 runs, at one stage at a commanding 2/243. Australia took a 1–0 series lead. Australian captain, Michael Clarke injured his right hamstring during the run-chase and admitted that he may never play again, Brad Haddin replaced him as captain during the innings.

=== 2nd Test ===
17–21 December 2014
Scorecard

| India | v | Australia |
| 408 (109.4 overs); Murali Vijay 144 (213); Josh Hazlewood 5/68 (23.2 overs) | | 505 (109.4 overs); Steve Smith 133 (191); Umesh Yadav 3/101 (25 overs) |
| 224 (64.3 overs); Shikhar Dhawan 81 (145); Mitchell Johnson 4/41 (17.3 overs) | | 6/130 (23.1 overs); Chris Rogers 55 (57); Ishant Sharma 3/38 (9 overs) |

Australia won by 4 wickets
The Gabba, Brisbane
Umpires: Marais Erasmus (SA) and Ian Gould (Eng)
Player of the match: Steve Smith (Aus)

- India won the toss and elected to bat.
- Bad Light ended play early on day 2.
- Josh Hazlewood (Aus) made his Test debut.

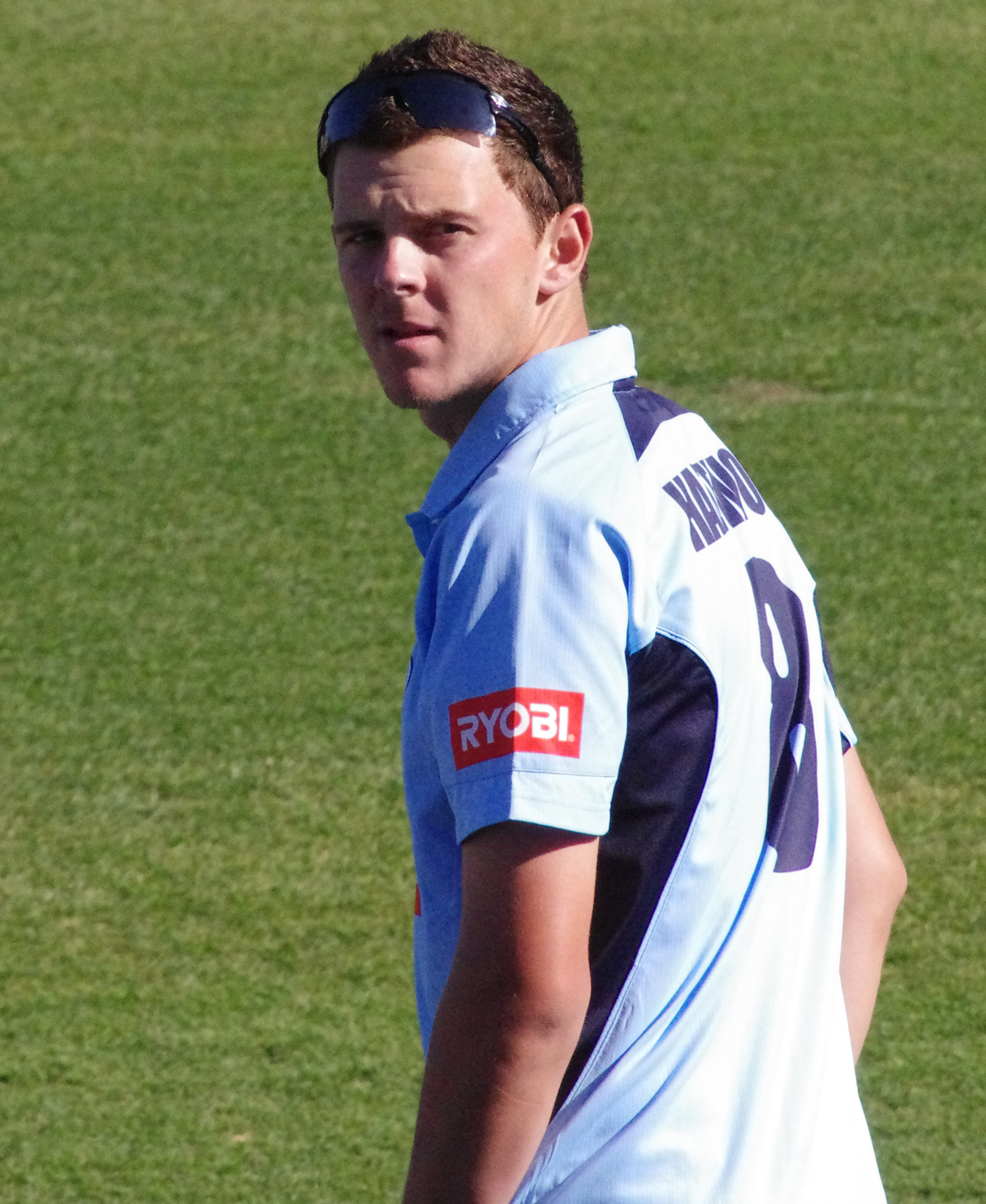
Josh Hazlewood made a successful Test debut, taking match figures of 7/142.

MS Dhoni won the toss for India and elected to bat on the first morning on a fast pitch, good for batting. Murali Vijay and Shikhar Dhawan put on a 50-run opening stand before Dhawan wasted yet another start when he was caught behind off Mitchell Marsh (24). Vijay (45*) and Cheteshwar Pujara (15*) led India to lunch at 1/89. India started very slowly after lunch, as Mitch Marsh limped off the field with a hamstring injury. Pujara (18) was eventually caught behind for Josh Hazlewood's first test wicket. However, replays showed the ball came off his helmet. Virat Kohli came in on the back of 2 centuries in the first test, and was caught behind for just 19. Ajinkya Rahane was shaky at the crease but steadied to reach tea on 13. India were 3/151 at tea with Vijay also not out on 73. Rahane and Vijay started quickly after tea as Vijay reached his century. The pair put on a 124-run partnership before Vijay was also caught behind (144). Rahane (75*) (his sixth career fifty and all outside India) and Rohit Sharma (26*) put together a 50-run stand as India reached 4/311 at stumps.

Rahane (81) and R.Sharma (32) fell early on Day 2, but MS Dhoni (33) and Ravichandran Ashwin (35) put on a quick fire 57-run stand but both fell in quick succession. Varun Aaron (4) fell shortly after as India were bowled out for 408 at lunch. Josh Hazlewood (5/63) was the best bowler taking 5 wickets on debut. Australia's innings started after lunch and Warner started quickly but top-edged a ball to slip (29). Shane Watson wasted another start and was caught at mid-on (25). Chris Rogers also missed a chance to make a big score when he was caught behind on the last ball before tea (55). Australia reached 3/121 at the break. Shaun Marsh came in after tea and he and captain Steve Smith put on an 87-run stand before S.Marsh (32) edged one to slip. His brother, Mitchell Marsh (7*) came in and joined Smith (65*) as Australia reached 4/221 at stumps.

M.Marsh (11) fell early on Day 3, when he let one go and was bowled by Ishant Sharma. Brad Haddin went shortly after when he was caught at short leg (6). Then Mitchell Johnson came in and belted the ball around as he and Smith (110*), who brought up his 6th test century and first as captain, put on a 104-run partnership before lunch as Australia reached 6/351 at the break, trailing India by just 57 runs. Johnson (88) and Smith (133) were dismissed shortly after the interval. Australia's tail annoyed the tired Indians as Mitchell Starc (51*) scored his fourth test fifty before the tea break. Starc (52) was bowled just after tea, giving Australia a solid 97-run first innings lead. All four main bowlers conceded 100 runs, with Umesh Yadav (3/101) being the pick of them. Mitchell Starc bowled Murali Vijay (27) after a quick start, India finished on 1/71 at the end of day 3.

India lost 5 early wickets on Day 4 as Mitchell Johnson ripped through their middle order of Kohli, Rahane, Rohit, and Dhoni. Cheteshwar Pujara (43) was caught just before lunch as India reached lunch reeling at 7/157. Dhawan and Umesh Yadav put on a 60-run partnership to give India some hope but when Dhawan (81) was given lbw to Nathan Lyon the final 2 wickets fell quickly as India were bowled out for 224 setting Australia a target of 128 to win. David Warner (6) fell early in the run chase and was followed by Shane Watson (0) just before tea as Australia reached 2/25 at the break. Steve Smith and Rogers steadied the Australian innings after tea, and put on a 63-run stand before Rogers (55) was caught at slip off Ishant Sharma. Shaun Marsh was caught behind shortly after for 17. Smith (28) was run-out by Yadav and India had a slight chance when Haddin (1) was caught off the bowling of Yadav. But Mitchell Marsh (6*) scored the remaining runs required as Australia won by 4 wickets and took a 2–0 series lead. Steve Smith was named Man of the Match for his century in the first innings, the ninth captain on debut to do so.

The win extended Australia's unbeaten streak in Brisbane to 26 Tests (19 wins and seven draws) and this was India's sixth consecutive lost in Australia. This was the fifth time in Test match history that a team had lost inside four days after making over 400 runs in the first innings of the match. Of the previous four Tests Australia won three of those Tests, while India won the other. The overall run rate of the match was 4.12 run per over – the highest for a Test played in Australia and the ninth highest ever.

=== 3rd Test ===
26–30 December 2014
Scorecard

| Australia | v | India |
| 530 (142.3 overs); Steve Smith 192 (305); Mohammed Shami 4/138 (29 overs) | | 465 (128.5 overs); Virat Kohli 169 (272); Ryan Harris 4/70 (26 overs) |
| 9/318d (98 overs); Shaun Marsh 99 (215); Ishant Sharma 2/49 (20 overs) | | 6/174 (66 overs); Virat Kohli 54 (99); Ryan Harris 2/30 (16 overs) |

Match drawn
Melbourne Cricket Ground, Melbourne
Umpires: Richard Kettleborough (Eng) and Kumar Dharmasena (SL)
Player of the match: Ryan Harris (Aus)

- Australia won the toss and elected to bat.
- Rain stopped play for 1 hour on Day 4.
- Joe Burns (Aus) and KL Rahul (Ind) both made their Test debuts
- This was the last Test match for MS Dhoni (Ind).

Steve Smith won his first toss and decided to bat on Day 1 of the Boxing Day Test. David Warner (0) fell early with the score at 1/0. Chris Rogers (46*) and Shane Watson (40*) put on a 92-run stand and led Australia out of trouble as they reached 1/92 at lunch. The pair put on another 23 runs before Rogers (57) was caught behind and Watson (52) fell lbw shortly after. Shaun Marsh (32*) and captain Steve Smith (23*) put on a 59-run partnership as Australia reached 3/174 at tea. Marsh (32) was caught behind shortly after tea and debutant Joe Burns started well but was also caught behind for 13. Smith (72*) and Brad Haddin (23*) put on a 43-run stand as Australia reached 5/259 at stumps. The crowd of 69,993 on day one was the second-highest Boxing Day crowd between the two teams.

Haddin and Smith continued their partnership very quickly in the first hour of Day 2, as Smith brought up his 3rd century of the series. Haddin (55) was eventually caught behind after a 110-run stand. Mitchell Johnson scored quickly as well before he was stumped for 28 off the bowling of Ravichandran Ashwin. Smith (128*) and Ryan Harris (10*) led Australia to lunch at 7/389. Harris came out after lunch and annoyed the Indian bowlers as he smashed 74, his highest test score, before he was given lbw. Nathan Lyon (11) and Smith (192) fell in quick succession after that as Australia were bowled out for 530 at the tea break. Murali Vijay and Shikhar Dhawan put on a 55-run opening stand until Dhawan (28) wasted another start when he edged one to slip. Vijay (55*) and Cheteshwar Pujara (25*) built a 52-run partnership as India reached stumps at 1/108.

Pujara (25) fell on the second ball of Day 3 and Vijay (68) was gone soon after. But then Virat Kohli and Ajinkya Rahane put on a 77-run partnership as India were 3/224 at lunch. The pair continued after lunch and built a massive partnership as they both brought up centuries, Kohli's 3rd of the series, as they led India all the way to tea at 3/336. Another 68 runs were added in the final session before Rahane (147) eventually was dismissed after a 262-run partnership. Debutant KL Rahul (3), MS Dhoni (11) and Ravichandran Ashwin (0) all fell in quick secession after that as India lost 4/25. Kohli (169) was dismissed right near the end of the day and the umpires called stumps with India at 8/462, trailing Australia by 68 runs.

Yadav (0) was caught behind early on Day 4 and Shami (12) was out shortly after as India were bowled out for 465. David Warner started quickly as Australia's lead raced to 100 before he was adjudged lbw off Ashwin (40). Shane Watson (15*) and Chris Rogers (33*) continued until lunch with the score at 1/90, a lead of 155. Rain delayed the middle session for an hour and shortly after the interval, Watson (17) was caught behind off the bowling of Sharma. Steve Smith looked good at the crease as Rogers brought up his 4th consecutive fifty, until Smith was caught at leg slip for 14. Shaun Marsh and Rogers put on a good 33-run stand before Rogers (69) once again didn't go on with his fifty and make a big score when he played on off Ashwin. Joe Burns and Marsh lasted until tea at 4/174, leading by 239 runs. Marsh and Burns started slowly after tea and Burns was caught behind (9). Brad Haddin (13) was also caught behind not long after. Mitchell Johnson started slowly and threw away his wicket when he was caught at mid-wicket (15) as Marsh brought up a half-century. Ryan Harris (8*) and Marsh (62*) guided Australia to 7/261 at stumps, a lead of 326 runs.

The pair continued their partnership on Day 5, until a rain delay halted play. Marsh built towards his century before Harris was dismissed (21) after a 69-run stand. Marsh was then desperate to get to his hundred before lunch and tried to push a quick single to mid-off and was run-out for 99. Australia then declared at lunch at 9/318, giving India a target of 384 off 71 overs. India's run chase started terribly when Dhawan (0), KL Rahul (1) and Vijay (11) all fell early with India at 3/19. Ajinkya Rahane (33*) and Virat Kohli (54*) built another partnership as India reached tea at 3/104. Kohli was gone on the first ball after tea with India in trouble. Rahane and Pujara also put on a 37-run stand before Pujara was bowled (21). Rahane (48) was also out shortly after. Ravichandran Ashwin (8*) and MS Dhoni (24*) lasted out the day when both captains agreed no result was possible and the match was drawn with 4 overs remaining. The draw ensured Australia won the series, a 2–0 lead with one match to go. Ryan Harris was awarded Man of the Match for his 6 wickets in the match and 74 in the first innings. MS Dhoni retired from Test cricket after this match.

=== 4th Test ===
6–10 January 2015
Scorecard

| Australia | v | India |
| 7/572d (152.3 overs); Steve Smith 117 (208); Mohammed Shami 5/112 (28.3 overs) | | 475 (162 overs); Virat Kohli 147 (230); Mitchell Starc 3/106 (32 overs) |
| 6/251d (40 overs); Steve Smith 71 (70); Ravichandran Ashwin 4/105 (19 overs) | | 7/252 (89.5 overs); Murali Vijay 80 (165); Josh Hazlewood 2/31 (17 overs) |

Match drawn
Sydney Cricket Ground, Sydney
Umpires: Richard Kettleborough (Eng) and Kumar Dharmasena (SL)
Player of the match: Steve Smith (Aus)

- Australia won the toss and elected to bat.
- For the first time, Australia's top six batsmen each scored half-centuries in the first innings of a Test.
- KL Rahul (Ind) scored his maiden Test century.
- Suresh Raina (Ind) played in his last Test match.

India made four changes for the final test and Australia made just one, with Mitchell Johnson out. The Australians won the toss and elected to bat for the third time in the series. Chris Rogers and Warner started quickly. The run-rate was then slowed, but Warner (63*) and Rogers (52*) put on a 100-run opening stand as Australia reached 0/123 at lunch. The pair continued after lunch as Warner brought up his 3rd century of the series. He was caught at slip shortly after for 101. Rogers (95) was also dismissed just 5 runs short of a century when he was bowled by Shami. Smith (28*) and Shane Watson (10*) guided Australia to tea at 2/242. The pair dominated the final session and added another 106 runs and as their partnership reached 144. Smith (82*) and Watson (61*), who was dropped on the second last ball, led Australia to stumps at 2/348.

Smith and Watson continued their partnership on Day 2 as Smith brought up his 4th century of the series. After a 196-run stand, Watson (81) was caught in the deep. Smith (117) fell shortly after as Australia reached lunch at 4/420 with Shaun Marsh (14*) and Joe Burns (0*). The pair built another partnership after lunch as both brought up half-centuries. Marsh (73) was eventually caught behind. Burns (52*) and Brad Haddin (7*), who hit a six off his first ball, lasted until tea at 5/538. Burns (58) was caught straight after tea and Ryan Harris smashed 25 off 9 balls until he was also caught. Australia then declared at 7/572. Mohammed Shami picked up his 2nd 5-wicket haul and his first outside India. Murali Vijay was out for a duck early in the innings before KL Rahul (31*) and Rohit Sharma (40*) put on a solid partnership as India reached stumps at 1/71. Steve Smith's century equals the record set by Sir Donald Bradman and Jacques Kallis of four hundreds in one series.

Sharma and Rahul built their partnership on Day 3 very slowly. Sharma brought up a half-century but was bowled shortly after (53). Rahul survived a huge run-out opportunity to bring up his first half-century as India reached lunch at 2/122, with Rahul (50*) and Virat Kohli (16*). The pair built a big partnership after lunch and dominated the Australian bowlers as Kohli brought up another half-century. Rahul brought up his first test century right on tea with India at 2/234 at the break. Rahul (110) was caught and bowled shortly after tea. Kohli and Ajinkya Rahane came together as Kohli brought up his fourth century of the series. Kohli became the first player to score three centuries in his first three innings as a captain. Shane Watson then took 2 wickets in as many balls to dismiss Rahane (13) and Suresh Raina for a golden duck. Wriddhiman Saha (14*) joined Kohli (140*) as India reached stumps at 5/342.

Kohli (147) was dismissed early on Day 4 as Saha and Ravichandran Ashwin put on a solid partnership before Saha (34) was out. Bhuvneshwar Kumar built a 65-run stand with Ashwin as India reached lunch at 7/407. Ashwin brought up a half-century after lunch but Kumar (35), Ashwin (50) and Umesh Yadav (4) all fell quickly after that as India were bowled out for 475, giving Australia a 97-run first innings lead. Smith declared overnight, giving India a target of 349 off 90 overs. Rahul (14) was caught early, but then Rohit Sharma and Vijay put on a 56-run stand until Sharma (39) was caught at slip. Virat Kohli and Vijay then built another partnership of 74 before Vijay (80) was caught behind. Kohli (46), Suresh Raina (0), who made a pair, Wriddhiman Saha (0) and Ashwin (1) all fell in quick succession as India lost 5/38. Ajinkya Rahane (38*) and Bhuvneshwar Kumar (20*) then lasted out the final 12 overs as the match ended in a draw. Starc, Hazlewood and Lyon picked up 2 wickets. Steve Smith was named man of the match and man of the series. The draw meant Australia regained the Border–Gavaskar Trophy with a 2–0 series win.

== Carlton Mid ODI Tri-Series ==
The Carlton Mid ODI Tri-Series was played between the host Australia, India and England. The tournament was a double round robin format, shorter than that of previous series. It started on 16 January 2015 and ended on 1 February. The series was won by Australia.
