= Australian cricket team in India in 2022–23 =

The Australian cricket team made two tours in India in 2022–23:

- Australian cricket team in India in 2022–23 (September 2022), Australia's tour of India in September 2022, part of the 2022–23 international calendar, to play three T20I matches
- Australian cricket team in India in 2022–23 (February–March 2023), Australia's tour of India in February/March 2022–23, part of the 2022–23 international calendar, to play four Tests and three ODIs
