= Australian cricket team in India in 1996–97 =

1996–97 Border–Gavaskar Trophy
- Date: 5 October – 14 October 1996
- Location: India
- Result: India won the 1-match series 1–0
- Player of the series: (India) Nayan Mongia
Teams
- Australia: India
Captains
- Mark Taylor: Sachin Tendulkar
Most runs
- Steve Waugh (93): Nayan Mongia (152)
Most wickets
- Paul Reiffel (5): Anil Kumble (9)

The Australian cricket team toured India in October 1996 for a one-off Test match.

== Squads ==
Australia	India
Mark Taylor (c); Michael Slater; Ricky Ponting; Mark Waugh; Steve Waugh; Michael Bevan; Ian Healy (wk); Brad Hogg; Paul Reiffel; Peter McIntyre; Glenn McGrath	Sachin Tendulkar (c); Nayan Mongia (wk); Vikram Rathour; Sourav Ganguly; Mohammad Azharuddin; Rahul Dravid; Sunil Joshi; Aashish Kapoor; Anil Kumble; David Johnson; Venkatesh Prasad

== Tour match ==
5–7 October
Scorecard

Australians	v	Indian Board President's XI
358/8d (91 overs); Michael Bevan 100* (99); Dodda Ganesh 5/103 (21 overs)		262 (79.5 overs); Pankaj Dharmani 130* (170); Mark Waugh 6/68 (16.5 overs)
99/2 (32 overs); Mark Taylor 41 (77); David Johnson 1/23 (10 overs)

Match drawn
Dhruve Pandove Stadium, Patiala
Umpires: Subroto Porel (Ind) and Ivaturi Shivram (Ind)

- Australians won the toss and elected to bat.

== Only Test ==
10–13 October 1996
Scorecard

Australia	v	India
182 (73 overs); Michael Slater 44 (96); Anil Kumble 4/63 (24 overs)		361 (131.4 overs); Nayan Mongia 152 (366); Paul Reiffel 3/35 (17 overs)
234 (108.3 overs); Steve Waugh 67* (221); Anil Kumble 5/67 (41 overs)		58/3 (13.2 overs); Sourav Ganguly 21* (29); Paul Reiffel 2/24 (6 overs)

India won by 7 wickets
Feroz Shah Kotla, Delhi
Umpires: Peter Willey (Eng) and Srinivas Venkataraghavan (Ind)
Player of the match: Nayan Mongia (Ind)

- Australia won the toss and elected to bat.
- Brad Hogg (Aus) and David Johnson (Ind) both made their Test debuts.
