= List of international cricket five-wicket hauls by Mitchell Starc =

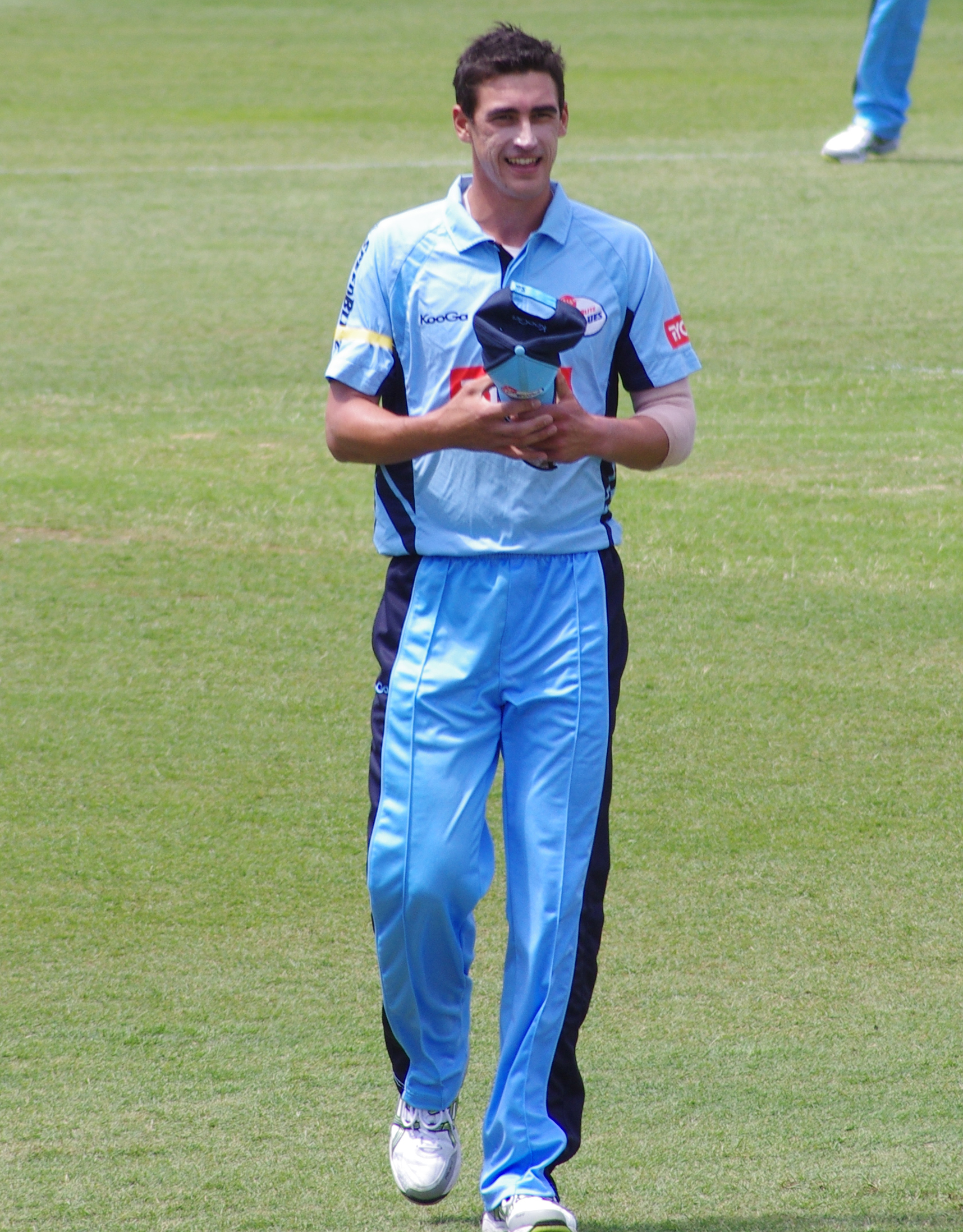
Australian fast bowler, Mitchell Starc, has taken 20 five-wicket hauls in Test cricket and 9 five-wicket hauls in ODIs.

In cricket, a five-wicket haul (also known as a "five–for" or "fifer") refers to a bowler taking five or more wickets in a single innings. This is regarded as a notable achievement, Mitchell Starc, an Australian cricketer has taken 29 five-wicket hauls in international cricket. A left-arm fast bowler, Starc has played 102 Tests, 127 One Day International (ODI) matches and 65 Twenty20 International (T20I) matches for his country, and has taken 402, 244 and 79 wickets respectively as of December 2025.

Starc made his Test debut against New Zealand at The Gabba, Brisbane on 1 December 2011. He took his first Test five-wicket haul against South Africa at the WACA Ground, Perth on 30 November 2012, taking 6/154. His best figures in Tests is 7/58, taken against England at Perth Stadium on 21 November 2025. Starc also has the fastest five-wicket haul in men's Test history, 6/9 against the West Indies at Sabina Park, Kingston on 14 July 2025.

Starc made his One Day International (ODI) debut against India at the Dr. Y. S. Rajasekhara Reddy ACA–VDCA Cricket Stadium, Visakhapatnam on 20 October 2010. He took his first ODI five-wicket haul against Pakistan at the Sharjah Cricket Stadium, Sharjah on 28 August 2012, taking 5/42. His best figures of 6/28 in ODIs came against New Zealand on 28 February 2015 at Eden Park, Auckland.

Starc made his Twenty20 International (T20I) debut against Pakistan on 7 September 2012 at the Dubai International Cricket Stadium, Dubai. As of June 2019, he is yet to take a five-wicket haul in the format, with his best figures being 3/11, taken against the same opposition at the same ground in the following match of the series on 10 September 2012.

== Key ==
Symbol	Meaning
Date	Day the Test started or ODI held
Inn	The innings of the match in which the five-wicket haul was taken
Overs	Number of overs bowled in that innings
Runs	Number of runs conceded
Wkts	Number of wickets taken
Batsmen	The batsmen whose wickets were taken in the five-wicket haul
Econ	Bowling economy rate (average runs per over)
Result	Result for Australia
*	One of two five-wicket hauls by Starc in a match
†	10 wickets or more taken in the match
‡	Starc was selected as man of the match

== Test five-wicket hauls ==
Five-wicket hauls in Tests by Mitchell Starc
No.	Date	Ground	Against	Inn	Overs	Runs	Wkts	Econ	Batsmen	Result
1	30 November 2012	WACA Ground, Perth	South Africa	3	28.5	154	6	5.34	Graeme Smith; Jacques Kallis; Robin Peterson; AB de Villiers; Dale Steyn; Morné Morkel	Lost
2	14 December 2012	Bellerive Oval, Hobart	Sri Lanka	4	28.2	63	5	2.22	Dimuth Karunaratne; Prasanna Jayawardene; Nuwan Kulasekara; Rangana Herath; Shaminda Eranga	Won
3	8 July 2015	Sophia Gardens, Cardiff	England	1	24.1	114	5	4.71	Ian Bell; Joe Root; Ben Stokes; Moeen Ali; James Anderson	Lost
4	6 August 2015	Trent Bridge, Nottingham	England	2	27	111	6	4.11	Adam Lyth; Ian Bell; Alastair Cook; Joe Root; Mark Wood; Jos Buttler	Lost
5	4 August 2016 *†	Galle International Stadium, Galle	Sri Lanka	1	16.1	44	5	2.72	Dimuth Karunaratne; Kaushal Silva; Kusal Mendis; Lakshan Sandakan; Rangana Herath	Lost
6	4 August 2016 *†	Galle International Stadium, Galle	Sri Lanka	3	12.3	50	6	4.00	Dimuth Karunaratne; Kusal Mendis; Dinesh Chandimal; Dhananjaya de Silva; Dilruwan Perera; Vishwa Fernando	Lost
7	13 August 2016	Singhalese Sports Club Cricket Ground, Colombo	Sri Lanka	1	25.1	63	5	2.50	Kaushal Silva; Dimuth Karunaratne; Kusal Mendis; Dinesh Chandimal; Suranga Lakmal	Lost
8	2 December 2017	Adelaide Oval, Adelaide	England	4	19.2	88	5	4.55	Mark Stoneman; James Vince; Craig Overton; Stuart Broad; Jonny Bairstow	Won
9	1 March 2018 ‡	Kingsmead, Durban	South Africa	2	10.4	34	5	3.18	Faf du Plessis; Theunis de Bruyn; Vernon Philander; Kagiso Rabada; Morné Morkel	Won
10	1 February 2019 *†‡	Manuka Oval, Canberra	Sri Lanka	2	13.3	54	5	4.00	Dinesh Chandimal; Dhananjaya de Silva; Dimuth Karunaratne; Dilruwan Perera; Vishwa Fernando	Won
11	1 February 2019 *†‡	Manuka Oval, Canberra	Sri Lanka	4	18	46	5	2.55	Dimuth Karunaratne; Dinesh Chandimal; Niroshan Dickwella; Kusal Perera; Vishwa Fernando	Won
12	29 November 2019	Adelaide Oval, Adelaide	Pakistan	2	25	66	6	2.64	Imam-ul-Haq; Asad Shafiq; Iftikhar Ahmed; Mohammad Rizwan; Babar Azam; Shaheen Afridi	Won
13	12 December 2019 ‡	Perth Stadium, Perth	New Zealand	2	18	52	5	2.88	Tom Latham; Kane Williamson; Henry Nicholls; Neil Wagner; Colin de Grandhomme	Won
14	6 July 2023	Headingley, Leeds	England	4	16	78	5	4.87	Ben Duckett; Moeen Ali; Ben Stokes; Jonny Bairstow; Harry Brook	Lost
15	6 December 2024	Adelaide Oval, Adelaide	India	1	14.1	48	6	3.38	Yashasvi Jaiswal; KL Rahul; Virat Kohli; Ravichandran Ashwin; Harshit Rana; Nitish Kumar Reddy	Won
16	12 July 2025 ‡	Sabina Park, Kingston	West Indies	4	7.3	9	6	1.2	John Campbell; Kevlon Anderson; Brandon King; Mikyle Louis; Shai Hope; Jayden Seales	Won
17	21 November 2025 †‡	Perth Stadium, Perth	England	1	12.5	58	7	2.88	Zak Crawley; Ben Duckett; Joe Root; Ben Stokes; Gus Atkinson; Jamie Smith; Mark Wood	Won
18	4 December 2025 ‡	The Gabba, Brisbane	England	1	20	75	6	3.75	Ben Duckett; Ollie Pope; Harry Brook; Will Jacks; Gus Atkinson; Brydon Carse	Won
19	22 August 2026 ‡	Harrup Park, Mackay	Bangladesh	1	10	12	6	1.20	Shadman Islam; Tanzid Hasan; Najmul Hossain Shanto; Mominul Haque; Litton Das; Shoriful Islam	Won
20	27 October 2026	Newlands Cricket Ground, Cape Town	South Africa	1	16.3	72	6	4.36	David Bedingham; Wiaan Mulder; Ryan Rickelton; Marco Jansen; Gerald Coetzee; Kagiso Rabada	TBD

== Test ten-wicket hauls ==
Ten-wicket hauls in Tests by Mitchell Starc
No.	Figures	Against	Venue	Date	Result
1	11/94	Sri Lanka	Galle International Stadium, Galle	4 August 2016	Lost
2	10/100	Sri Lanka	Manuka Oval, Canberra	1 February 2019	Won
3	10/113	England	Perth Stadium, Perth	21 November 2025	Won
4	10/51	Bangladesh	Harrup Park, Mackay	22 August 2026	Won

== One Day Internationals ==
Five-wicket hauls in ODIs by Mitchell Starc
No.	Date	Ground	Against	Inn	Overs	Runs	Wkts	Econ	Batsmen	Result
1	28 August 2012 ‡	Sharjah Cricket Stadium, Sharjah	Pakistan	1	10	42	5	4.20	Nasir Jamshed; Asad Shafiq; Kamran Akmal; Shahid Afridi; Umar Akmal	Won
2	1 February 2013 ‡	WACA Ground, Perth	West Indies	1	6.5	20	5	2.92	Kieran Powell; Ramnaresh Sarwan; Dwayne Bravo; Kieron Pollard; Jason Holder	Won
3	3 February 2013	WACA Ground, Perth	West Indies	2	8	32	5	4.00	Chris Gayle; Ramnaresh Sarwan; Darren Bravo; Kieran Powell; Devon Thomas	Won
4	18 January 2015 ‡	Melbourne Cricket Ground, Melbourne	India	1	10	43	6	4.30	Shikhar Dhawan; Suresh Raina; MS Dhoni; Axar Patel; Rohit Sharma; Bhuvneshwar Kumar	Won
5	28 February 2015	Eden Park, Auckland	New Zealand	2	9	28	6	3.11	Martin Guptill; Ross Taylor; Grant Elliott; Luke Ronchi; Adam Milne; Tim Southee	Lost
6	6 June 2019	Trent Bridge, Nottingham	West Indies	2	10	46	5	4.60	Chris Gayle; Andre Russell; Carlos Brathwaite; Jason Holder; Sheldon Cottrell	Won
7	29 June 2019	Lord's, London	New Zealand	2	9.4	26	5	2.68	Kane Williamson; Tom Latham; Ish Sodhi; Lockie Ferguson; Mitchell Santner	Won
8	20 July 2021 ‡	Kensington Oval, Bridgetown	West Indies	2	8	48	5	6.00	Evin Lewis; Jason Mohammed; Nicholas Pooran; Kieron Pollard; Akeal Hosein	Won
9	19 March 2023 ‡	Dr. Y. S. Rajasekhara Reddy International Cricket Stadium, Visakhapatnam	India	1	8	53	5	6.62	Shubman Gill; Rohit Sharma; Suryakumar Yadav; K. L. Rahul; Mohammed Siraj	Won
