= Nayan Mongia =

Indian cricketer

Personal information
- Full name: Nayan Ramlal Mongia
- Born: 19 December 1969 (age 56); Baroda, Gujarat, India
- Height: 5 ft 6 in (168 cm)
- Batting: Right-handed
- Role: Wicket-keeper

Career statistics
Competition	Test	ODI
Matches	44	140
Runs scored	1,442	1,272
Batting average	24.03	20.19
100s/50s	1/6	0/2
Top score	152	69
Catches/stumpings	99/8	110/45
Medal record
Men's Cricket
Representing India
ACC Asia Cup
Winner	1995 United Arab Emirates
- Source: ESPNcricinfo, 4 February 2006

Nayan Ramlal Mongia (born 19 December 1969) is a former Indian cricketer and cricket coach. He was a right-handed batsman and a wicketkeeper. He was part of the Indian squad which won the 1995 Asia Cup.

Nayan Mongia was accused of match-fixing against West Indies as he gobbled up 21 balls to make a mere 4 runs along with Manoj Prabhakar who made a slow century. This resulted in the West Indies winning the match by 43 runs. Mongia was dropped from the team in the year 2001. He was a lower order wicket-keeper batsman and batted occasionally on 7th or 8th position. He has represented India in 2 World Cups, 1996 and 1999.

== Playing career ==
=== First tour of England ===
In his first tour to England in 1990, he impressed Alan Knott, who claimed Mongia was a player with natural talent. Mongia spent many years as India's second most successful wicket-keeper after Kiran More. Mongia made his debut in the Indian national cricket team in the mid-1990s and from there, he was considered as India's number one choice as a wicket keeper

=== Opening and highest score ===
Mongia scored his maiden Test century against Australia in the one-off Test during the latter's tour of India in 1996–97, in Delhi. Opening the batting, he scored 152 on a "slow turning wicket of low bounce". Writing for the Indian Express, former cricketer Ian Chappell called it an innings of "skill, patience and concentration". Mongia was dropped from the team after dissent and allegations of match-fixing. Mongia retired from first class cricket in December 2004.

He also took 5 catches in an ODI match twice. His record was later broken by MS Dhoni who achieved this feat 4 times in his career.

In 183 first-class matches, starting in November 1989, he made 353 catches and 43 stumpings, and scored over 7000 runs. In international cricket, Mongia played 44 Tests ending his Test career in an epic Kolkata Test against Australia in March 2001.

== Coaching career ==
In 2004, he was taken as a coach for Thailand national cricket team. Mongia has also been coach for 2004 ACC Trophy in Malaysia. Along with the national team, he was also appointed as a coach for Thailand national under-19 cricket team as well.

== Match fixing allegations ==
In the year 2000, Mohommad Azharuddin told CBI that he took money from bookies to fix a match, he also revealed that Ajay Jadeja and Nayan Mongia were involved in fixing. Ex- secretary of BCCI Jayawant Lele in his book alleged Mongia for fixing and playing intentionally slow, in his book 'I was there- Memories of a Cricket administrator'. As per Lele, Mongia was isolated in dressing room, he wrote 3 incidents which might had raised suspicions on Mongia by his fellow player like Tendulkar, Ganguly and caused his isolation. Per Lele 'In 1994's Kanpur ODI against West Indies, Mongia deliberately played slow and scored 16 runs in 9 overs, India lost that match'. He came under investigation after this match. Mongia denied Lele's allegations. His name was in the report of CBI with Mohommad Azharuddin. Later his charges got lifted and he returned in national team. He was the part of the match at Eden gardens, when India defeated Australia in the test in 2001.

== In media ==
- I Was There-Memoirs of a Cricket Administrator – A book authored by former BCCI secretary Jayawant Lele. In it Lele told his experience of his days as administrator and alleged Mongia was involved in match fixing.
