= Australian cricket team in India in 2016–17 =

International cricket tour

2016–17 Border–Gavaskar Trophy
- Date: 16 February – 29 March 2017
- Location: India
- Result: India won the 4-match series 2–1
- Player of the series: (India) Ravindra Jadeja
Teams
- Australia: India
Captains
- Steve Smith: Virat Kohli (Note: Ajinkya Rahane captained India for the fourth Test.)
Most runs
- Steve Smith (499): Cheteshwar Pujara (405)
Most wickets
- Steve O'Keefe (19) Nathan Lyon (19): Ravindra Jadeja (25)

The Australian cricket team toured India in February and March 2017 playing four Test matches. India won the series 2–1. With the series victory, India held all the series titles against all of the other Test sides at the same time.

The Board of Control for Cricket in India (BCCI) confirmed the dates of the tour in October 2016. DRS was used for the first time in the Border–Gavaskar Trophy in this series, although Hot Spot was not used. Australia played the first Test match in Pune, just one day after they played a Twenty20 International match against Sri Lanka in Adelaide.

== Squads ==
India	Australia
Virat Kohli (c); Ajinkya Rahane (vc); Ravichandran Ashwin; Shreyas Iyer; Ravindra Jadeja; Bhuvneshwar Kumar; Abhinav Mukund; Karun Nair; ~~Hardik Pandya~~; Cheteshwar Pujara; KL Rahul; Wriddhiman Saha (wk); Ishant Sharma; Murali Vijay; Jayant Yadav; Kuldeep Yadav; Umesh Yadav	Steve Smith (c); David Warner (vc); Ashton Agar; Jackson Bird; Pat Cummins; Peter Handscomb; Josh Hazlewood; Usman Khawaja; Nathan Lyon; Shaun Marsh; Mitchell Marsh; Glenn Maxwell; Steve O'Keefe; Matt Renshaw; Mitchell Starc; Marcus Stoinis; Mitchell Swepson; Matthew Wade (wk)

Mitchell Marsh suffered a shoulder injury during the second Test and was ruled out of the rest of the series. Marcus Stoinis was named as his replacement. Hardik Pandya was left out the squad for the last two matches of the series due to a shoulder injury. Mitchell Starc was ruled out of the last two Tests with a foot injury. Pat Cummins was named as his replacement. Ahead of the fourth Test, Shreyas Iyer was added to India's squad as cover for Virat Kohli, who was suffering with a shoulder injury.

== Tour match ==
=== Three-day match: India A v Australia ===
17–19 February 2017
Scorecard

Australia	v	India A
469/7d (127 overs); Steve Smith 107 (161); Navdeep Saini 2/42 (19.4 overs)		403 (91.5 overs); Shreyas Iyer 202* (210); Nathan Lyon 4/162 (28.5 overs)
110/4 (36 overs); Peter Handscomb 37 (69); Rishabh Pant 1/9 (2 overs)

Match drawn
Brabourne Stadium, Mumbai
Umpires: Anil Dandekar (Ind) and Milind Pathak (Ind)

- India A won the toss and elected to field.

== Test series ==
=== 1st Test ===
23–27 February 2017
Scorecard

Australia	v	India
260 (94.5 overs); Matt Renshaw 68 (156); Umesh Yadav 4/32 (12 overs)		105 (40.1 overs); KL Rahul 64 (97); Steve O'Keefe 6/35 (13.1 overs)
285 (87 overs); Steve Smith 109 (202); Ravichandran Ashwin 4/119 (28 overs)		107 (33.5 overs); Cheteshwar Pujara 31 (58); Steve O'Keefe 6/35 (15 overs)

Australia won by 333 runs
Maharashtra Cricket Association Stadium, Pune
Umpires: Richard Kettleborough (Eng) and Nigel Llong (Eng)
Player of the match: Steve O'Keefe (Aus)

- Australia won the toss and elected to bat.
- This was the first Test to be played at this venue.
- Mitchell Starc (Aus) passed 1,000 runs in Tests.
- Ravichandran Ashwin (Ind) overtook Kapil Dev's record for the most wickets in a season in India.
- Steve O'Keefe (Aus) took his first 5-wicket haul in Tests. He also took five wickets in 19 balls, the joint-second-fewest deliveries for a five-for against India.
- India lost their last seven wickets in the first innings for eleven runs, their worst collapse in Tests.
- Steve O'Keefe's match figures of 12 for 70 are the best figures by a visiting spin bowler in a Test in India and are also the best match figures for an Australian bowler against India.
- This was Australia's first Test win in India since 2004 and the first win by any visiting team in India since 2012.

=== 2nd Test ===
4–8 March 2017
Scorecard

India	v	Australia
189 (71.2 overs); KL Rahul 90 (205); Nathan Lyon 8/50 (22.4 overs)		276 (122.4 overs); Shaun Marsh 66 (197); Ravindra Jadeja 6/63 (21.4 overs)
274 (97.1 overs); Cheteshwar Pujara 92 (221); Josh Hazlewood 6/67 (24 overs)		112 (35.4 overs); Steve Smith 28 (48); Ravichandran Ashwin 6/41 (12.4 overs)

India won by 75 runs
M. Chinnaswamy Stadium, Bangalore
Umpires: Richard Illingworth (Eng) and Nigel Llong (Eng)
Player of the match: KL Rahul (Ind)

- India won the toss and elected to bat.
- Nathan Lyon (Aus) recorded the best bowling figures by a visiting bowler in India.
- Nathan Lyon also became the highest Australian wicket taker against India (with 58 wickets), and the first to take three seven-wicket hauls against India.
- This was the first time in a Test that four different bowlers each took six wickets in an innings.
- Ravichandran Ashwin (Ind) took his 25th five-wicket haul, achieving it in the fewest Tests (47).

=== 3rd Test ===
16–20 March 2017
Scorecard

Australia	v	India
451 (137.3 overs); Steve Smith 178* (361); Ravindra Jadeja 5/124 (49.3 overs)		603/9d (210 overs); Cheteshwar Pujara 202 (525); Pat Cummins 4/106 (39 overs)
204/6 (100 overs); Peter Handscomb 72* (200); Ravindra Jadeja 4/54 (44 overs)

Match drawn
JSCA International Stadium Complex, Ranchi
Umpires: Chris Gaffaney (NZ) and Ian Gould (Eng)
Player of the match: Cheteshwar Pujara (Ind)

- Australia won the toss and elected to bat.
- This was the first Test to be played at this venue and the 800th Test played by Australia.
- Murali Vijay (Ind) played his 50th Test.
- Steve Smith (Aus) passed 5,000 runs in Tests, becoming the third-fastest and youngest Australian batsman to do so.
- Glenn Maxwell (Aus) scored his maiden Test century and became the second player for Australia to score a century in all three international formats.
- Steve Smith's score of 178 not out is the highest score by an Australian captain in India and 3rd highest overall score by an Australian in India.
- Cheteshwar Pujara (Ind) faced 525 balls for his 202 runs, the most deliveries faced by an Indian batsmen in a Test innings.
- The 199-run partnership between Pujara and Wriddhiman Saha was the highest seventh-wicket stand for India against Australia in Tests.

=== 4th Test ===
25–29 March 2017
Scorecard

Australia	v	India
300 (88.3 overs); Steve Smith 111 (173); Kuldeep Yadav 4/68 (23 overs)		332 (118.1 overs); Ravindra Jadeja 63 (95); Nathan Lyon 5/92 (32.1 overs)
137 (53.5 overs); Glenn Maxwell 45 (60); Ravindra Jadeja 3/24 (18 overs)		106/2 (23.5 overs); KL Rahul 51* (76); Pat Cummins 1/42 (8 overs)

India won by 8 wickets
Himachal Pradesh Cricket Association Stadium, Dharamshala
Umpires: Marais Erasmus (SA) and Ian Gould (Eng)
Player of the match: Ravindra Jadeja (Ind)

- Australia won the toss and elected to bat.
- This was the first Test to be played at this venue.
- Ajinkya Rahane (Ind) captained India for the first time in Tests.
- Kuldeep Yadav (Ind) made his Test debut.
- Steve Smith became the first batsman for Australia to score three hundreds in a series in India.
- Ravichandran Ashwin (Ind) took his 79th wicket in the 2016–17 season, the most for a bowler in a single season.

== Decision referral ==
The second Test witnessed a controversy when the Australian team was accused of having taken help from the dressing room in using the Decision Review System (DRS). Australia's captain Steve Smith admitted to having looked in the direction of the dressing room for assistance when he was given out leg before wicket (lbw) off Umesh Yadav when he was on 28 by the on-field umpire Nigel Llong, who, immediately intervened to send him back and denying a referral. India's captain Virat Kohli, in his post-match interview, accused the team of having done that on at least three occasions; once as Smith was declared lbw, and twice as he batted, which he stated to having pointed out to the umpires. As the controversy broke out, Australia's Peter Handscomb tweeted admitting to have "referred" Smith to "look at the box". Picking on Smith having played down the incident terming it a "brain fade", Kohli said, "Honestly, if someone makes a mistake while batting, for me, personally, that's a brain fade. ... But if something is going on for three days, then that's not a brain fade, as simple as that."

Australia's coach Darren Lehmann dismissed Kohli's allegations and responded that his team "[n]ever, ever, ever" sought the dressing room's assistance. The CEO of Cricket Australia (CA), James Sutherland called the criticism "outrageous" and said, "We reject any commentary that suggests our integrity was brought into disrepute or that systemic unfair tactics are used, and stand by Steve and the Australian cricketers who are proudly representing our country." The Board of Control for Cricket in India (BCCI) responded with a statement: "BCCI has requested the ICC (International Cricket Council) to take cognisance of the fact that Smith admitted to a 'brain fade' at that moment. BCCI sincerely hopes that the rest of the matches are played in the true spirit of cricket." The ICC said it would not "press charges" against either teams or captains and added that ahead of the third Test, the match referee would "bring both captains together to remind them of their responsibilities to the game". However, the BCCI filed an official complaint against Steve Smith and Peter Handscomb with the ICC.
