= Australian cricket team in India in 2012–13 =

2012–13 Border–Gavaskar Trophy
- Date: 12 February 2013 – 26 March 2013
- Location: India
- Result: India won the 4-match series 4–0
- Player of the series: (India) Ravichandran Ashwin
Teams
- Australia: India
Captains
- Michael Clarke (Note: Shane Watson captained Australia for the fourth Test.): MS Dhoni
Most runs
- Michael Clarke (286): Murali Vijay (430)
Most wickets
- Nathan Lyon (15): Ravichandran Ashwin (29)

The Australian cricket team toured India from 12 February to 26 March 2013, played a four-match Test series against India. During the 1st Test, Mahendra Singh Dhoni set the highest score by an Indian Test captain, scoring 224 runs, beating the previous record held by Sachin Tendulkar. India won the four Test series in a 4–0 whitewash to win the Border–Gavaskar Trophy. This was first time Australia lost a test series 4–0 after their defeat against South Africa in 1970.

== Squads ==
Australia introduced two debutants, Moisés Henriques and Glenn Maxwell while India also introduced two debutants, Bhuvneshwar Kumar and Ajinkya Rahane.

Tests
India	Australia
MS Dhoni (c, wk); Virender Sehwag; Sachin Tendulkar; Virat Kohli; Shikhar Dhawan; Murali Vijay; Ajinkya Rahane; Cheteshwar Pujara; Ravindra Jadeja; Harbhajan Singh; Ishant Sharma; Bhuvneshwar Kumar; Ravichandran Ashwin; Pragyan Ojha; Ashok Dinda	Michael Clarke (c); Shane Watson (vc); Jackson Bird; Ed Cowan; Xavier Doherty; Moisés Henriques; Phillip Hughes; Mitchell Johnson; Usman Khawaja; Nathan Lyon; Glenn Maxwell; James Pattinson; Peter Siddle; Steve Smith; Matthew Wade (wk); Mitchell Starc; David Warner

== Tour matches ==
=== Two-day: Indian Board President's XI v Australians ===
12–13 February 2013
Scorecard

Australians	v	Board President's XI
200 (88.3 overs); Ed Cowan 58 (109); Parvez Rasool 7/45 (28.3 overs)		344 (68.3 overs); Ambati Rayudu 132 (150); Moisés Henriques 4/109 (30.3 overs)
74/5 (16 overs); Glenn Maxwell 25* (14); Umesh Yadav 3/8 (10)

Match drawn
Guru Nanak College Ground, Chennai
Umpires: Sudhir Asnani (Ind) and CK Nandan (Ind)

- Australians won the toss and elected to bat.

=== Three-day: India A v Australians ===
16–18 February 2013
Scorecard

India A	v	Australians
451 (128.4 overs); Manoj Tiwary 129 (187); Ashton Agar 3/107 (20 overs)20		235 (62.3 overs); Shane Watson 84 (87); Rakesh Dhurv 5/51 (14.3 overs)
		195/3 f/o (55 overs); Shane Watson 60 (63); Jalaj Saxena 1/37 (16 overs)

Match drawn
Guru Nanak College Ground, Chennai
Umpires: Anil Chaudhary (Ind) and Pashchim Pathak (Ind)

- India A won the toss and elected to bat.

== Test series (Border–Gavaskar Trophy) ==
=== 1st Test ===
22–26 February 2013
Scorecard

Australia	v	India
380 (133 overs); Michael Clarke 130 (246); Ravichandran Ashwin 7/103 (42 overs)		572 (154.3 overs); MS Dhoni 224 (265); James Pattinson 5/96 (30 overs)
241 (93 overs); Moises Henriques 81* (148); Ravichandran Ashwin 5/95 (32 overs)		50/2 (11.3 overs); Virender Sehwag 19 (23); James Pattinson 1/13 (3 overs)

India won by 8 wickets
M. A. Chidambaram Stadium, Chennai
Umpires: Kumar Dharmasena (SL) and Marais Erasmus (SA)
Player of the match: MS Dhoni (Ind)

- Australia won the toss and elected to bat.
- Moises Henriques (Aus) and Bhuvneshwar Kumar (Ind) made their Test debuts.
- Harbhajan Singh (Ind) played in his 100th Test.

Australia won the toss and chose to bat first on a flat and dry pitch that would turn from the very first day of the match. Ed Cowan and David Warner made a brisk start to the innings, but MS Dhoni managed to stump Cowan off an Ashwin delivery to halt the opening partnership at 64. Australia los the wicket of Phillip Hughes for 6, but went into lunch at 126-2. Shane Watson fell victim to Ashwin soon after lunch, and at 126-3, this brought Michael Clarke to the crease. Australia lost a further two wickets, in Warner and Matthew Wade before the duo of Clarke and debutant Moises Henriques stitched a crucial partnership taking Australia to 215-5 at Tea. Both batsmen completed their half centuries after the Tea break and continued piling on the runs. At 304-6, Ashwin was able to beat Henriques on the sweep catching him LBW, bringing to an end the 151 run partnership. Mitchell Starc departed soon after for a measly 3 runs, but Clarke brought up his century in the last over of the day, with Australia having managed to fight back to a total of 316 for the loss of 7 wickets.

On Day 2, Clarke and the tail-enders managed to drag the innings to 380 all out at lunch. Virender Sehwag and Murali Vijay opened the batting, but both were dismissed soon at leave India in a spot of bother at 12-2. Sachin Tendulkar and Cheteshwar Pujara began the task of rebuilding the innings on a pitch that was beginning to take more turn. Pujara and Tendulkar stitched together an important 93 run partnership, but Pujara was dismissed against the run of play at 105-3. Virat Kohli was the next man in and along with Tendulkar, he negotiated the remaining overs, to ensure India were 182-3 at the close of play.

Day 3 would be a crucial day, as a good batting performance by India would ensure they would ensure parity or them overtaking the Australian total, but a poor one would almost certainly put them in a losing position on a deteriorating pitch. On 81, Tendulkar was deceived by a Lyon delivery spinning away and was bowled, meaning India was 196-4. MS Dhoni strode out to the crease, and along with Kohli he took the attack to the Australians, compiling a quickfire 37 off 42 by lunch, and India were comfortable at 263-4. After lunch, the positive continued as both batsmen regularly found the boundary and Kohli brought up his 2nd hundred against Australia as the team score crossed 300. Soon after, Kohli miscued a Lyon ball to Mitchell Starc bringing an end to a fluently compiled 107. India's next few batsmen hung around with Dhoni who brought up his hundred soon after tea. At 406-8, it looked unlikely that India would achieve a substantial lead to drive home the advantage. Bhuvneshwar Kumar and Dhoni however, came together to forge a 140 run partnership for the 9th wicket that would truly wrestle back control for India. Dhoni reached 200 in the final session, making him the first Indian wicket keeper batter to score a double century. At the close of play on Day 3, India ended at a dominant 515-8, leading by a decisive 135 runs.

On Day 4, India stretched their total to 572, Dhoni was finally dismissed at 224, and Bhuvneshwar Kumar contributed a crucial 38 off 97 balls.

In the second innings, the Indian spinners struck regularly, and except Henriques, no other Aussie showed any resistance, thus leaving India with a small target. Sachin Tendulkar finished the match by hitting two sixes off consecutive balls.

=== 2nd Test ===
2–6 March 2013
Scorecard

Australia	v	India
237/9d (85 overs); Michael Clarke 91 (186); Ravindra Jadeja 3/33 (16 overs)		503 (154.1 overs); Cheteshwar Pujara 204 (341); Glenn Maxwell 4/127 (26 overs)
131 (67 overs); Ed Cowan 44 (150); Ravichandran Ashwin 5/63 (28 overs)

India won by an innings and 135 runs
Rajiv Gandhi International Cricket Stadium, Hyderabad
Umpires: Kumar Dharmasena (SL) and Marais Erasmus (SA)
Player of the match: Cheteshwar Pujara (Ind)

- Australia won the toss and elected to bat.
- Cheteshwar Pujara became 2nd fastest Indian to get 1000 runs in Test Cricket.
- Glenn Maxwell (Aus) made his Test debut.
- Australia became the first team in Test cricket to declare in its first innings, and then lose the match by an innings.

India again lost the toss but this time the pacers extracted early movement which aided the spinners and resulted in low 1st innings total for Australia. Clarke and Wade had a useful partnership but the constant loss of wickets meant Clarke declared early. India, in their first innings, thanks to Pujara and Vijay for the partnership of 370 runs, scored 500+ again and the spinners in the 2nd innings dismissed Australia cheaply. This match marked the last test in the career of Virender Sehwag.

=== 3rd Test ===
14–18 March 2013
Scorecard

Australia	v	India
408 (141.5 overs); Mitchell Starc 99 (144); Ishant Sharma 3/72 (30 overs)		499 (132.1 overs); Shikhar Dhawan 187 (174); Peter Siddle 5/71 (29.1 overs)
223 (89.2 overs); Phillip Hughes 69 (147); Bhuvneshwar Kumar 3/31 (10 overs)		136/4 (33.3 overs); Virat Kohli 34 (61); Xavier Doherty 1/24 (7 overs)

India won by 6 wickets
I. S. Bindra Stadium, Mohali
Umpires: Aleem Dar (Pak) and Richard Kettleborough (Eng)
Player of the match: Shikhar Dhawan (Ind)

- Australia won the toss and elected to bat.
- No play was possible on Day 1 due to rain.
- Shikhar Dhawan (Ind) made his Test debut.

The first day was lost to rain, and thanks to Smith and Starc's batting, Australia got a healthy first innings total. India, however, with Dhawan's quickfire debut century and steady batting from Vijay, got a small lead. In the second innings, the Indian bowlers again dismissed the Australians for a low score and India won on the last day with less than 4 overs left.

=== 4th Test ===
22–26 March 2013
Scorecard

Australia	v	India
262 (112.1 overs); Peter Siddle 51 (136); Ravichandran Ashwin 5/57 (34 overs)		272 (70.2 overs); Murali Vijay 57 (123); Nathan Lyon 7/94 (23.2 overs)
164 (46.3 overs); Peter Siddle 50 (45); Ravindra Jadeja 5/58 (16 overs)		158/4 (31.2 overs); Cheteshwar Pujara 82* (92); Glenn Maxwell 2/54 (12 overs)

India won by 6 wickets
Feroz Shah Kotla Ground, Delhi
Umpires: Aleem Dar (Pak) and Richard Kettleborough (Eng)
Player of the match: Ravindra Jadeja (Ind)

- Australia won the toss and elected to bat.
- Ajinkya Rahane (Ind) made his Test debut.
- Ravindra Jadeja (Ind) took his first five-wicket haul in Tests.

Clarke was ruled out due to Back injury and Watson was the captain. The spinners wreaked havoc in the match, and only Siddle from Australia and Pujara from India showed some resistance. Jadeja got his best bowling figures in Tests in the second innings and India won the test to record their first-ever whitewash against Australia.

== Australian team disciplinary breach ==
Homeworkgate refers to a controversial sequence of events that took place during the 2013 tour of India.

=== Incident ===
Australia lost the first two Tests of the series, the second of them by a heavy margin: an innings and 135 runs. In this game, Australia became the first team in Test cricket to declare in its first innings, and then lose the match by an innings. With two Test matches left, the best Australia could hope for was a drawn series. Before the 3rd Test, four Australian players – Shane Watson, James Pattinson (both of whom had played in the 2nd Test), Mitchell Johnson and Usman Khawaja (who were in the touring party) – were made ineligible for the match following a breach of discipline. The incident referred to an assignment given by head coach Mickey Arthur to the players requiring them to give in writing ways to improve their performance to help the team. The aforementioned players did not submit their replies within the time stipulated. Michael Clarke, the captain, revealed that the extreme step had been taken as a result of repeated infractions. Former players reacted with astonishment at the harsh decision taken by the team management. Vice-captain Watson returned to the tour, after he flew back to Sydney after being dropped.

== Statistics ==
=== Individual ===
Statistic	India		Australia	
Most series runs	Murali Vijay	430	Michael Clarke	286
Highest innings	Mahendra Singh Dhoni	224	Michael Clarke	130
Most centuries	Murali Vijay	2	Michael Clarke	1
Most fifties	Cheteshwar Pujara	2	Moisés Henriques; David Warner; Peter Siddle	2
Most wickets	Ravichandran Ashwin	29	Nathan Lyon	15
Most five-wicket hauls	Ravichandran Ashwin	4	James Pattinson; Peter Siddle; Nathan Lyon	1
Best innings figure	Ravichandran Ashwin	7/103	Nathan Lyon	7/94
Best match figure	Ravichandran Ashwin	12/198	Nathan Lyon	9/165
Most catches (wicket-keepers included)	Mahendra Singh Dhoni	9	Ed Cowan; Brad Haddin	4
Most stumpings	Mahendra Singh Dhoni	4	Matthew Wade & Brad Haddin	1

=== Team ===
Statistic	India	Australia
Highest team total	572	408
Lowest team total	50	131
Tosses won	0	4

=== Australia ===
- Michael Clarke reached 7,000 Test career runs when he scored 130 in the 1st innings of the 1st Test.
- Michael Clarke scored his 23rd Test century when he scored 130 in the 1st innings of the 1st Test.
- Moisés Henriques scored his first Test half-century when he scored 68 in the 1st innings of the 1st Test.
- James Pattinson took his third five-wicket haul in the 1st innings of the 1st Test.
- Moisés Henriques took his first Test wicket when he bowled Harbhajan Singh in the 1st innings of the 1st Test.
- Glenn Maxwell took his first Test wicket when he got Murali Vijay out in the 1st innings of the 2nd Test.
- Peter Siddle took his seventh five-wicket haul in the 1st innings of the 3rd Test.
- Nathan Lyon took his third five-wicket haul in the 1st innings of the 4th Test.

=== India ===
- Ravichandran Ashwin took his sixth five-wicket haul in the 1st innings of the 1st Test.
- Virat Kohli scored his fourth Test century when he scored 107 in the 1st innings of the 1st Test.
- MS Dhoni reached 4,000 Test career runs when he scored 224 in the 1st innings of the 1st Test.
- MS Dhoni scored his first Test double century and his sixth Test century when he scored 224 in the 1st innings of the 1st Test.
- Ravichandran Ashwin took his seventh five-wicket haul and completed ten wickets in a match for the second time in the 2nd innings of the 1st Test.
- Bhuvneshwar Kumar took his first Test wicket when he bowled David Warner in the 1st innings of the 2nd Test and he is the first bowler to take his first wicket as bowled in all three formats of cricket.
- Cheteshwar Pujara scored his fourth Test century and 2nd double century when he scored 204 in the 1st innings of the 2nd Test.
- Murali Vijay scored his second Test century when he scored 167 in the 1st innings of the 2nd Test.
- Cheteshwar Pujara reached 1,000 Test Career runs when he scored 204 in the 1st innings of the 2nd Test.
- Virat Kohli reached 1,000 Test Career runs when he scored 34 in the 1st innings of the 2nd Test.
- Ravichandran Ashwin took his eighth five-wicket haul in the 2nd innings of the 2nd Test.
- Shikhar Dhawan scored his first Test century (on debut) when he scored 187 in the 1st innings of the 3rd Test.
- Murali Vijay scored his third Test century when he scored 153 in the 1st innings of the 3rd Test.
- Ravichandran Ashwin took his ninth five-wicket haul in the 1st innings of the 4th Test.
- Murali Vijay reached 1,000 Test career runs when he scored 57 in the 1st innings of the 4th Test.
- Pragyan Ojha reached 100 Test career wickets when he took the wicket of James Pattinson in the 1st innings of the 4th Test.
- Ravindra Jadeja took his first five-wicket haul in the 2nd innings of the 4th Test.

== Records from the series ==
- MS Dhoni's 224 in the first Test match is the third highest(Highest by an Indian), individual score by a wicket-keeper batsman. (third to Andy Flower's 232 and Kumar Sangakkara's 230)
- Shikhar Dhawan's 187 is the fastest ever century by a batsman on his debut.
- Australia became first-ever country to declare the match on the first day and lose it by an innings.
