= Mitchell Starc =

Australian cricketer (born 1990)

- Starc in 2026

Personal information
- Full name: Mitchell Aaron Starc
- Born: 30 January 1990 (age 36); Baulkham Hills, New South Wales, Australia
- Height: 197 cm (6 ft 6 in)
- Batting: Left-handed
- Bowling: Left-arm fast
- Role: Bowler
- Relatives: Alyssa Healy (m. 2016): Brandon Starc (brother)

International information
- National side: Australia (2010–present)
- Test debut (cap 425): 1 December 2011 v New Zealand
- Last Test: 27 October 2026 v South Africa
- ODI debut (cap 185): 20 October 2010 v India
- Last ODI: 30 September 2026 v South Africa
- ODI shirt no.: 56
- T20I debut (cap 59): 7 September 2012 v Pakistan
- Last T20I: 24 June 2024 v India
- T20I shirt no.: 56

Domestic team information
- Years: Team
- 2008/09–present: New South Wales
- 2011/12–2014/15: Sydney Sixers
- 2012: Yorkshire
- 2014–2015: Royal Challengers Bangalore
- 2024: Kolkata Knight Riders
- 2025–2026: Delhi Capitals
- 2025/26: Sydney Sixers

Career statistics
Competition	Test	ODI	T20I	FC
Matches	110	132	65	163
Runs scored	2,527	610	98	3,424
Batting average	19.58	11.96	9.80	20.26
100s/50s	0/13	0/1	0/0	0/16
Top score	99	52*	14	99
Balls bowled	20,899	6,734	1,458	29,608
Wickets	460	247	79	648
Bowling average	25.97	23.96	23.81	25.76
5 wickets in innings	20	9	0	28
10 wickets in match	4	0	0	6
Best bowling	7/58	6/28	4/20	8/73
Catches/stumpings	53/–	48/–	22/–	81/–
Medal record
Men's cricket
Representing Australia
ICC Cricket World Cup
Winner	2015 Australia and New Zealand
Winner	2023 India
ICC T20 World Cup
Winner	2021 UAE and Oman
ICC World Test Championship
Winner	2021–2023
Runner-up	2023–2025
- Source: Cricinfo, 1 November 2026

Mitchell Aaron Starc (born 30 January 1990) is an Australian international cricketer who plays for the Australian national team and New South Wales in domestic cricket. A left-arm fast bowler and a lower order left-handed batsman, he is Australia's fourth highest wicket-taker in both Test and One Day International (ODI) cricket.

Starc began playing international cricket in 2010, but the early part of his career was disrupted by persistent injuries. He came to worldwide attention as a prominent member of the Australian squad that won the 2015 Cricket World Cup, and was declared Player of the Tournament as a result of his consistent performances throughout the matches. He also was a part of the team that won the 2023 ICC Cricket World Cup. At the 2019 Cricket World Cup, he picked up 27 wickets, which is an all-time record for the most wickets taken in a single edition of the tournament. In doing so, he became the leading wicket-taker in successive Cricket World Cup tournaments, having previously achieved the feat in 2015 as well. As of November 2023, he is the 3rd-highest wicket taker of all time in ICC Cricket World Cups.

He is the fastest bowler in the history of ODI cricket to reach 150 and 200 wickets, taking 77 and 102 matches respectively to reach the milestone. He is also the fastest bowler in the history of Cricket World Cups to reach 50 wickets, taking just 19 WC games to reach the milestone. Starc was also a key member of the Australian team that won the 2021 ICC T20 World Cup, and the 2023 ICC World Test Championship final. He is one of five players who have managed to win an ICC trophy in all three formats of the game.

Starc has been noted for his ability to bowl at great pace, with his fastest delivery being measured at over 160.4 km/h (the fastest ever recorded in a Test match), and for generating reverse swing with his bowling.

== Domestic career ==
=== Early domestic career ===
Starc started playing cricket from a young age, at 9 years old for Northern Districts as a wicket keeper. He was a representative cricketer of the Northern Districts Cricket Association and attended Homebush Boys High School, representing the school's 1st grade cricket team. He is also a former junior cricketer for the Berala Sports Cricket Club in Sydney, where he was known to wicket keep and bowl in the same innings.

Starc had a rookie contract with New South Wales for the 2008/09 summer, and in February 2009 was brought into their squad to replace Aaron Bird after Bird was suspended for having an illegal bowling action. He made his first-class debut in New South Wales' final match of the season on 5 March 2009 against Western Australia. The match was drawn and New South Wales finished on the bottom of the ladder for the 2008–09 Sheffield Shield season as a result.

Western Australia approached Starc to recruit him for their team in the 2009/10 season, but he already had a contract with New South Wales and stayed with them instead. In eight Sheffield Shield games through the season, he took 21 wickets, including a best of 5 for 74 against Queensland, and scored a half-century against Victoria. Starc was selected to play for the Australian Institute of Sport in 2010, where his bowling helped the team to win the Emerging Players Twenty20 Trophy over teams from India, New Zealand, and South Africa.

=== Indian Premier League ===
Throughout his cricket career, Starc has been signed to play for multiple franchises in the Indian Premier League (IPL), but due to injuries and commitments to the Australian national team, he has missed more seasons than he has played. As of 2025, the only three franchises he has played for are Royal Challengers Bangalore, Kolkata Knight Riders and Delhi Capitals. He joined the Knight Riders for a record-breaking transfer.

In 2014, Starc was signed by the Royal Challengers Bangalore to play in the 2014 IPL. In a match against Kings XI Punjab, Starc took two diving catches near the boundary to dismiss Glen Maxwell and Wriddhiman Saha. Starc used a different method to most Australian cricketers to take these catches, with his fingers pointed down instead of up. Starc said of this, "Back home, most players favour the reverse cup method and some also say it is easier to get into the right position. But I have been used to the other method since childhood and it has stayed with me." In a match on 6 May against Mumbai Indians, Starc got involved in an altercation with Mumbai batsman Kieron Pollard. In the 17th over of Bangalore's innings, Starc bowled a bouncer to Pollard which Pollard failed to hit, after which the two players exchanged words. While Starc was in his run-up for the next delivery, Pollard pulled away from the crease, expecting Starc to abort his run-up. Instead of aborting, Starc followed Pollard and bowled the ball at his legs. Pollard swung his bat, threatening to throw it at Starc, and it slipped out of his hand and went to the leg side. Both players were fined a portion of their match fee (Starc 75% and Pollard 50%) and charged with offences under the IPL's code of conduct, with Starc charged with "conduct that either (a) is contrary to the spirit of the game; or (b) brings the game into disrepute." Public reaction to the altercation was overwhelmingly negative. ESPNcricinfo editor Nagraj Gollapudi opined that both players were let off leniently, as the punishment in the code of conduct could have been up to 100% of their match fee as well as a two-match ban. Ravi Shastri, then a member of the IPL governing council, warned that repeat incidents could result in match bans and fines of double the players' match fees.

Starc's start to the 2015 season was delayed due to a knee injury which kept him in Australia. Before Starc's arrival, Bangalore were at the bottom of the IPL table, but when Starc returned he took the lead of Bangalore's bowling and turned the team around. Royal Challengers Bangalore only lost one of their next seven matches, and Starc finished the tournament with 20 wickets. He missed the IPL in 2016 because of a foot fracture injury and in February 2017 parted ways with Royal Challengers Bangalore in order to reduce his workload and focus on his fitness for the upcoming 2017 ICC Champions Trophy.

In January 2018, Starc was bought by Kolkata Knight Riders for the equivalent of A$1.8 million, the second most of any Australian player bought in the 2018 auction, but he never played a match for the team. He was ruled out of the 2018 Indian Premier League due to injury, having tibial bone stress in his right leg sustained in a Test series against South Africa. The 2019 Indian Premier League was set to take place immediately before the 2019 Cricket World Cup, and Cricket Australia decided not to grant no objection certificates to players. This meant that any players selected to play in the World Cup would have been expected to leave the IPL early to join a pre-tournament camp. In November 2018, Kolkata released Starc from his contract, freeing him up to spend time preparing for the World Cup. Kolkata's decision was believed to be a result of Cricket Australia's refusal to make Starc available for the whole IPL season. Starc had taken insurance for his contract Kolkata, which would have entitled him to A$1,530,000 after missing the 2018 season because of injury, but the insurance company declared him ineligible and refused to pay. In 2019 Starc took legal action against the insurance company to recoup his losses.

Starc pulled out of the 2022 season, citing "bubble fatigue" as a reason. He decided to return for the 2024 season and was bought by Kolkata Knight Riders for ₹24.75 crore (A$3.8 million) on 19 December 2023, breaking the record for most expensive buy in the history of IPL auctions, and played in his first IPL since 2015, and on 26 May 2024, Starc bowled 3 overs, taking 2/14 in the eight wicket victory of Kolkata Knight Riders against Sunrisers Hyderabad in the Tata IPL Final.

Starc was bought by Delhi Capitals to play in 2025 Indian Premier League for ₹11.75 crore (£930,000). And on 30 March 2025, He took 5/35 leading Delhi Capitals to win against Sunrisers Hyderabad.

== International career ==
=== 2010–2012 ===
Due to his impressive performances in the 2010 winter, Starc was chosen as a late replacement in Australia's tour of India in late 2010, replacing the injured Josh Hazlewood. Starc made his international debut on this tour, playing in a One Day International (ODI) against India on 20 October 2010. He did not bat and was wicketless. Starc played his second ODI later in the summer, in the final match of Australia's three-match series against Sri Lanka. Sri Lanka had already won the series by winning the first two matches, their first ever series win in Australia. Starc and fellow fast bowler Clint McKay took nine wickets between them in Sri Lanka's innings to set up an eight-wicket win for Australia. The win ended a seven-match losing streak for Australia. Ahead of the 2010–11 Ashes series, Starc was selected to play for Australia A in a warm-up match against England. During a Sheffield Shield match for New South Wales the week before the match, Starc suffered a side strain injury, ruling him out for four weeks. As a result, he missed the Australia A match and wasn't considered for selection in the Ashes. He was selected again to play for Australia A in the 2011 winter for a tri-series in Zimbabwe.

Starc came into contention for a Test cricket debut in the 2011/12 season. He took two five-wicket hauls against Queensland in November: first in a Sheffield Shield match, then in a one-day match. Despite New South Wales losing both matches, Starc was named the player of the match in the one-day match because of both his bowling performance and strong hitting late in New South Wales' batting innings. He was once again selected to play for Australia A, this time in a warm-up match against New Zealand at the end of November. During this match, he was announced as part of Australia's team for the first Test match against New Zealand to replace the injured Ryan Harris, setting him up to make his Test debut.

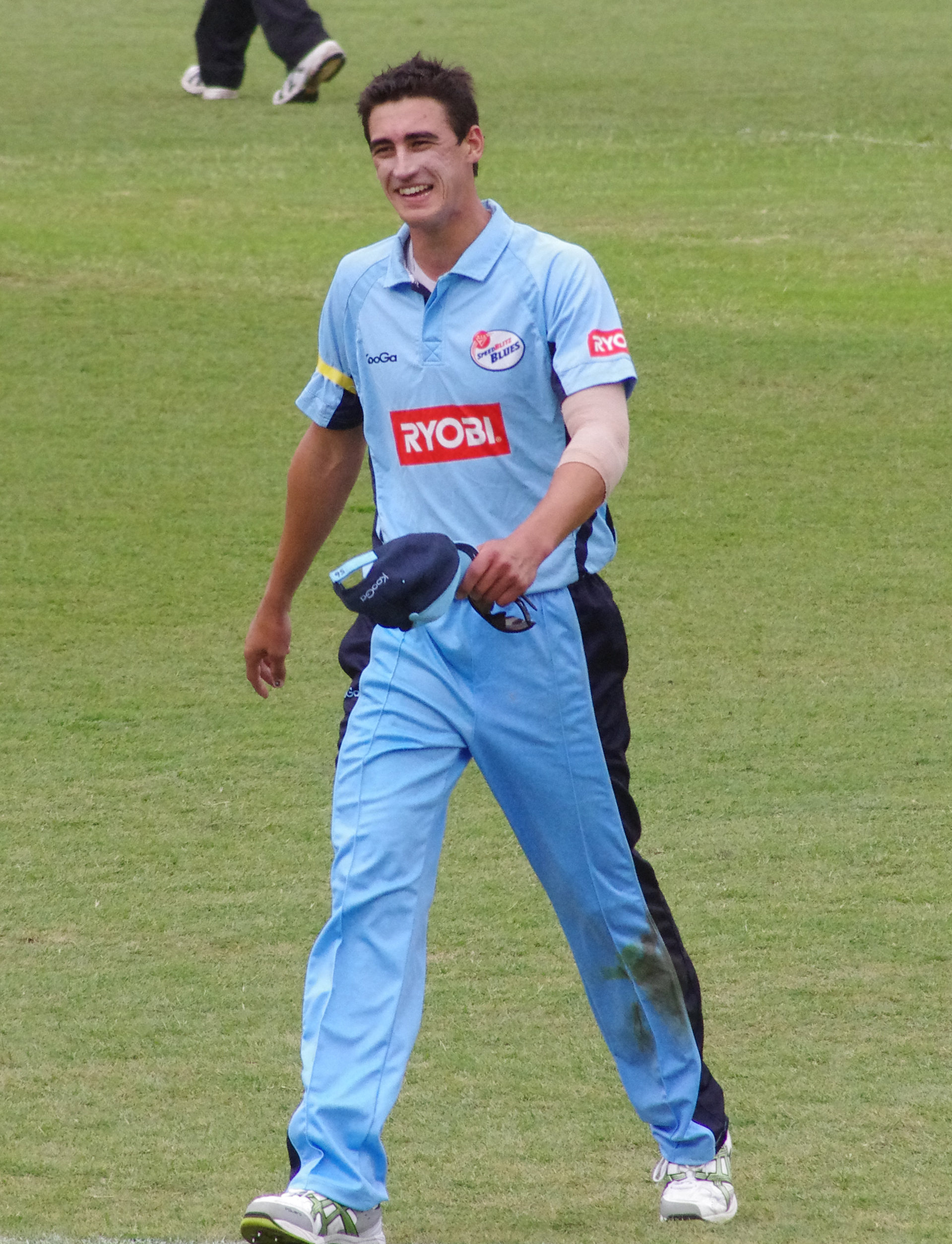
Starc playing for New South Wales in 2008

Starc made his Test debut for Australia on 1 December 2011, in the first Test of the two-Test series against New Zealand. He was given his baggy green by Richie Benaud and took two wickets in the match. He took another two wickets in the second Test, but he was left out of the team named for the first Test of the subsequent series against India, and was then removed from the squad entirely for the 2012 New Year's Test to make way for Ryan Harris, as Harris had recovered from his injury. While out of the squad he played for the Sydney Sixers in the Big Bash League, and took three wickets in a man-of-the-match performance against the Sydney Thunder. Starc was recalled to Australia's Test squad when James Pattinson was ruled out because of a foot injury, and he played in the third Test on the pace-friendly WACA Ground in place of spinner Nathan Lyon. He excelled in bowling with swing to right-handed batsmen, and among his four wickets he successfully dismissed Sachin Tendulkar leg-before-wicket. He was left out of the team for the final Test match of the series to make way for Lyon's return, and was also removed from Australia's ODI squad to make way for the return of Ryan Harris. This freed him up to play domestic cricket for New South Wales for the rest of the season.

Starc returned to the national squad for their Test series in the West Indies in April 2012. He did not play in the first two Test matches, but was brought into the team for the final match of the series because of injuries to James Pattinson and Peter Siddle. Once the series was finished, Yorkshire County Cricket Club attempted to sign to Starc for the 2012 County Championship to bolster their fast bowling line-up. He was signed for a five-week contract and was set to play in four matches for Yorkshire, starting with a match on 9 May. However, upon his arrival in the United Kingdom, Starc was detained and questioned at Heathrow Airport for more than four hours then deported because his visa forms had not been filled out correctly. He had to fly home to Australia then back to England, missing the 9 May match. Starc didn't make his county championship debut for Yorkshire until 30 May, a drawn match against Northamptonshire in which he took 5 wickets. Starc was called up again to return to the Australian squad in early July for the final ODI of a series against England, though he did not play in the match, and then he joined Australia A for their subsequent tour of England.

Starc again joined the Australian ODI squad for Australia's series against Afghanistan and Pakistan in August and September 2012. He began the tour in superb form, winning man of the match in Australia's first two matches for taking four wickets against Afghanistan and five wickets against Pakistan in two wins. He did not take any wickets in the 2nd ODI against Pakistan, during which he complained of a chest injury, and Australia lost the match. In the final deciding ODI of the series, Starc bounced back and took four wickets. Australia won the series and Starc was named the player of the series because of his nine wickets in Australia's two wins. Then-captain Michael Clarke pointed to Starc's bowling in the series as a standout, saying, "He bowled with good pace. He's such a tall guy and he swung the ball beautifully in conditions where there wasn't much there for the fast bowlers as well." Starc stayed in Australia's squad for the 2012 ICC World Twenty20 in Sri Lanka, where Australia made it to the semi-finals but were knocked out of the tournament by the West Indies.

=== 2012–2013 ===
Before the start of the 2012/13 summer in Australia, Starc played in the 2012 Champions League Twenty20 for the Sydney Sixers, alongside fellow national team fast bowlers Pat Cummins and Josh Hazlewood. This created problems for the national team, as the Champions League meant that the three would only have the chance to play one first-class match before the first Test match of the Australian summer, hindering their preparation. This also created the potential problem of the three bowlers having too high of a workload and suffering from injuries, preventing them from being at their fittest when playing for Australia. Australia's bowling coach, Ali de Winter, travelled to South Africa for the tournament to ensure they wouldn't be overexerting themselves. Sixers captain Brad Haddin trusted Starc to bowl the final overs of each game, and Starc was very successful throughout the tournament. He featured prominently in the Sixers' game against his old team Yorkshire, taking three wickets to help restrict Yorkshire to just 96 runs from their twenty overs. He followed this up in a game against the Highveld Lions with another three wickets. The Sixers won the tournament undefeated, and Starc finished as the tournament's leading wicket-taker with 14 wickets, getting him named player of the tournament. Starc's success despite the heavy workload he'd had over the last twelve months impressed de Winter, who said he had proven to be "robust".

Upon his return to Australia, Starc admitted that he had lost seven kilograms due to a gastric complaint during the World Twenty20 in Sri Lanka and a follow-up illness during the Champions League in South Africa. Starc was in consideration for the first Test match against South Africa, but was ultimately left out of the team in favour of Ben Hilfenhaus. He was named as 12th man for the first two Test matches, and in the meantime played well for New South Wales to push his case for inclusion in the team. He was finally included in the team for the final Test of the series in Perth. Whilst Australia lost the match, Starc took 6/154 and achieved the second fastest Test fifty (32 balls) by an Australian in Australia's second innings on 4 December. Though Australia lost that match, Starc helped bowl Australia to their first win of the summer in the next match against Sri Lanka in Hobart. In the final innings, Starc bowled aggressively with reverse swing and took the final two wickets of the innings to win the match, finishing with figures of 5/63. Despite his recent form, he was rested in favour of Jackson Bird to make his debut for the subsequent Boxing Day Test. The decision to rest Starc for the Boxing Day Test was controversial. Australia's young fast bowlers in recent years had suffered from many stress fractures, which sports scientists attributed to heavy workloads, and with Starc being the only bowler to play for Australia in all three formats (Tests, ODIs, and T20Is) he had a very heavy workload. However, the decision was criticised both because of the significance that playing in the Boxing Test match would have for Starc, and because resting Starc in the middle of a Test series could have consequences for his confidence and form. Former Australian fast bowler Damien Fleming noted that bowlers can't simply be switched on and off like robots.

Starc and Bird would both be selected for the Sydney Test a week later, and Starc remained in the team for the following ODI series against Sri Lanka. During the opening match of the series, Starc experienced calf soreness which forced him to miss the second match. This was the first time an injury had forced Starc to miss a match for Australia. He also played in Australia's ODI series against the West Indies, and he was named player of the match for a devastating 5/20 spell in the 1st ODI, which helped bowl the West Indies out for 70 runs (a total which Australia chased within just 10 overs). During this time, a bone spur was discovered in Starc's ankle. Due to the intense schedule for the Australian team in the upcoming year, Starc chose to forgo surgery to fix the issue which would have taken him out of the team for up to three months. Starc also chose not to submit his name for the 2013 IPL player auction despite the expectation that he would attract a considerable sum of money. He instead opted to take two months to rest between Australia's 2013 tours of India and England. In the 3rd Test of Australia's tour of India, Starc came within one run of being the first Australian to score a Test century batting 9 or below for 65 years. He played "nervelessly" through most of his innings, but when he reached 99 India's captain MS Dhoni brought the fielders in to put more pressure on Starc, and he began to play false shots. Starc attempted to drive the ball from Ishant Sharma's bowling, but instead he edged the ball behind him and was caught by Dhoni. This turned out to be Starc's final match of the tour. India had won the series at the end of the 3rd Test match, so rather than risk Starc's ankle spur becoming a bigger problem, the team's management sent him back to Australia for surgery with the hope that he would be recovered in time for the tour of England. It was then discovered that a separate spur had already broken off on the inside of Starc's ankle, which had been causing him pain for several months. Starc later revealed that he had been relying on injections of painkillers to get through his bowling, but the injections were no longer numbing the pain by the end of the India series. The surgery was a success and he was named in Australia's squads for the 2013 ICC Champions Trophy and the 2013 Ashes series in England.

Starc's first international match after recovering from his ankle surgery came in Australia's first match of the Champions Trophy. This loss to England turned out to be Starc's only match for the tournament as he was still tentative in his recovery from injury. He continued his recovery by playing in a tour match against Somerset, in which he and James Pattinson tore through Somerset's batting with the second new ball, taking 6 wickets for no runs as Somerset collapsed from 2/304 to 320 all out. In the 2013 Ashes series, Starc played in Australia's loss in the first match but was dropped for the second Test. He was brought back into the team for the third match, being preferred because he could help create footmarks on the pitch for off-spinner Nathan Lyon to bowl into. Starc struggled to bowl with accuracy, but on day 3 of the match he was able to generate reverse swing with the ball and take several key wickets. His inaccuracy also proved useful, as a wayward ball delivered to the leg side dismissed Alastair Cook when Cook was well set at the crease. Starc's wickets helped to give Australia a chance of winning the match, but the match was ultimately drawn. Starc was yet again dropped for the fourth match of the series, and yet again recalled for the fifth and final match, with England having already retained the Ashes. By this point he had no played in two consecutive matches in a series since 2011. Overall, his Ashes series showed signs that he was improving, but consistency and inaccuracy remained issues for him. Instead of staying in England for the following ODI series, Starc returned home to Australia because of lower back soreness. This was later diagnosed as a stress fracture which ruled Starc out of Australia's home summer, including the 2013–14 Ashes series rematch against England. Starc would not return to the Australian Test team until October 2014.

=== 2013–2015 ===
Starc recovered from his back injury and returned to Australia's team in the shorter ODI and Twenty20 formats in the second half of the 2013/14 season, but he didn't play a single first-class match until his return to the Test team in Australia's series against Pakistan in the United Arab Emirates in October 2014. After playing in the 2nd Test match, Starc returned to Australia to play for New South Wales in the Sheffield Shield. He took seven wickets in his first match back against South Australia, but suffered a groin strain and was ruled out of the next match. Starc returned to the Test team again for Australia's home series against India. Starc played in the 2nd Test match at the Gabba, selected because his bowling style suited the wicket there, but he performed poorly and his body language was criticised by former Test cricketer Shane Warne. Starc was dropped for the 3rd Test but recalled again for the 4th and final match of the series. He was officially reprimanded by the International Cricket Council for an "exaggerated celebration" after taking the wicket of Murali Vijay. When Vijay was caught behind the stumps by Brad Haddin, Starc celebrated by screaming in Vijay's face. Despite the reprimand, Starc performed well and took five wickets.

Starc helped Australia to win the 2015 Carlton Mid Triangular Series against India and England. He bowled well from the first match of the series, taking two wickets in the first three balls of England's batting innings. He followed up his four wickets against England with six wickets against India, again taking a wicket in the first over of the innings. He was named the player of the match in both matches, and his performances took him to a career total of 59 ODI wickets at a strike-rate of just 24.2 deliveries per wicket. At the time, this strike-rate was the world record for players with more than 50 wickets.

=== 2015 Cricket World Cup ===
Starc was part of Australia's victorious team in the 2015 Cricket World Cup, hosted in Australia and New Zealand. He took two wickets against England in the first match, but Australia's second match against Bangladesh was abandoned without a ball being bowled due to rain. Australia's third match of the World Cup was played against co-hosts New Zealand. Australia batted first and only scored 151, a target which they were not expected to be able to defend. Starc bowled well with swing to begin with, but after bowling 6 overs he was taken out of the bowling attack. Starc was brought back on later to bowl his remaining overs. He bowled the 23rd over, the last of his allotted 10 overs, with New Zealand at 145 runs for 7, needing just 7 more runs to win. New Zealand's innings had been led by Kane Williamson, who was on strike at the start of Starc's over, but took a single off the second ball. Starc's next delivery was a yorker, which bowled out Adam Milne. His next delivery was another yorker, which bowled out Tim Southee and put Starc on a hat-trick. Australia needed one more wicket to win the match, but New Zealand's final batsman, Trent Boult, was able to defend the last two balls of Starc's spell. Williamson hit the winning runs for New Zealand in the following over. Starc finished the match with 6 wickets, the second time he'd achieved this during the season. In doing so, he became the first Australian ever to take 6 wickets in an ODI on multiple occasions.

After the loss to New Zealand, Australia won the rest of their group matches against Afghanistan, Sri Lanka, and Scotland. Against Scotland, Starc took four wickets for 14 runs in just five overs of bowling, including dismissing both of Scotland's opening batsmen in the first seven overs of the innings. Australia made it to the final of the World Cup, which was again played against New Zealand. This time New Zealand batted first, and Starc opened the bowling for Australia. On the third ball of the match, Starc bowled Brendon McCullum. This wicket had the effect of putting New Zealand on the defensive from the very beginning, and they never recovered. Starc finished the tournament with 22 wickets and a bowling average of 10.18. His bowling strike-rate was 17.4 balls per wicket, the best of any bowler in a World Cup since the inaugural 1975 Cricket World Cup. Starc was named the player of the tournament, and he finished the tournament as the top-ranked ODI bowler in the world.

=== 2015 ===
Starc returned to red-ball cricket in Australia's tour of the West Indies in June 2015. He took time in his first few overs of the Test series to find his rhythm, but once he did he became very difficult for the West Indies batsmen to handle. His 10 wickets at an average of 16.00 was second only to Josh Hazlewood in the series. After the West Indies series, Australia went to England for the 2015 Ashes series. Starc's form made him a big threat to England, with former Test cricketer Graham Swann describing him as "beyond the best match-winning player they've got at the minute." In a tour match ahead of the Ashes against Essex, Starc bowled a spell in which he took six wickets, including the last four wickets of Essex's innings inside just 20 deliveries.

In the first match of the Ashes, Starc ran into trouble bowling to left-handed batsmen. His release point close to the stumps allowed left-handers Alastair Cook and Gary Ballance to see which way the ball was going to swing, reducing Starc's impact with the new ball. He was still able to take five wickets in England's first innings, and was Australia's most successful bowler during the match, but he took his wickets at the cost of many runs. Starc also experienced an ankle injury on the first day of the match, so he required painkillers to bowl for the rest of the match. The ankle injury put Starc in doubt to play the second match, but he pushed through the pain and helped Australia to a win with two wickets. In the third Test match Starc's batting became more important, because Australia trailed by 145 runs after the first innings, then fell to 7/153 when Starc came in to bat in the second innings. He and wicket-keeper Peter Nevill put on a partnership of 64 runs to keep Australia in the game, and Starc scored 58 before he got out, but this wasn't enough to prevent England from winning the Test match within 3 days. In the fourth Test, Starc took career-best bowling figures of 6/111 in England's first innings, but this turned out to be England's only innings because they won the match by an innings and 78 runs to regain the Ashes. Across the Ashes, Starc had had numerous bowling spells that England's batsmen were incapable of responding to, but he was never able to bowl to his best in crucial moments. He managed to take 18 wickets, but conceded nearly 4 runs per over through the series.

Australia's time in England finished with an ODI series. Starc played, but his ankle injury from earlier in the tour became aggravated again. MRI scans showed that Starc once again had bone spurs in his ankles. He required cortisone injections to treat inflammation in his ankle joint and missed the 4th ODI, but returned for the final match of the series despite many other players being rested because of the short turnover to their next tour in Bangladesh (though this tour was postponed a day before the Australian players were scheduled to fly to Bangladesh due to security concerns, and ultimately rescheduled for 2017). Starc took a wicket in the opening over of the match, reminiscent of the 2015 World Cup final, as Australia bowled out England for a mere 138 runs. During the match, Starc bowled a ball which struck England captain Eoin Morgan on the helmet and forced him to retire hurt due to concussion. This had an impact on Starc because he had been there in 2014 for the match where Phillip Hughes was struck by the ball and later died. The concussion meant Morgan was unable to play any further matches in the 2015 season.

The postponement of Australia's tour of Bangladesh left Starc available to play domestic cricket. He began the 2015/16 season playing for New South Wales in the 2015–16 Matador BBQs One-Day Cup. Cricket Australia had him rested for New South Wales' fifth match because of his ankle injury, but Starc dominated the rest of the tournament. Starc helped New South Wales to win the tournament in the final, where he took three wickets. Across the tournament he took 26 wickets with a bowling average of 8.11 (the player with the next-most wickets was Kane Richardson with 15) and was named player of the series. This broke the record for the most wickets in a season in Australian domestic one-day cricket, beating a record set by Shane Harwood, who took 24 wickets in 10 matches in the 2008–09 Ford Ranger One Day Cup.

Starc finished the 2015 calendar year by playing in Australia's Test series against New Zealand. During the first match of the series, he threw the ball at batsman Mark Craig in frustration. Craig had hit two fours off Starc's bowling, then blocked the next ball back to Starc. Starc threw the ball back at Craig, but it missed him and ran away for four overthrows. Starc was fined 50% of his match fee for the incident. In the second Test match, Starc bowled the fastest ball recorded in Test cricket, with the broadcaster's speed gun measuring it at 160.4 km/h. Due to flat pitches in both of these matches, Starc had a heavy workload, and in the second Test bowled more overs than he'd ever bowled in a Test match before. Starc again required cortisone injections after this match. The heavy workload and his ankle caught up with him in the final match of the series, the inaugural day-night Test match at Adelaide Oval, when he had to leave the field on the first day due to a stress fracture in his foot. The injury meant he couldn't play in Australia's subsequent series against the West Indies, but it didn't require surgery. Starc initially intended to delay surgery for his ankle spurs until after Australia's tour of New Zealand and the 2016 World Twenty20, but after meeting with specialists it was determined that it was best for him to have the surgery, making him unavailable for both of these events. Despite all of his injury troubles, Starc finished 2015 as the best-performing bowler of the year in international cricket. His 46 wickets in Test matches and 41 wickets in ODIs made him the leading wicket-taker in international cricket.

=== 2016 ===
Starc's return from his foot surgery in December 2015 came when he was named in Australia's squad for the 2016 West Indies Tri-Series in June. He trained ahead of the series at the National Cricket Centre alongside other Australian players who weren't participating in the 2016 Indian Premier League, including Australian captain Steve Smith, who hoped that his return would "scare" opposition teams. Starc was rested for two matches early in the series to manage his workload, both of which Australia lost, but Australia went on to win the tournament with Starc playing in the final. Starc got through the series without any ankle pain and with much more flexibility in his ankle than before his surgery.

Starc next joined Australia's tour of Sri Lanka from July to September, where he experienced great personal success. He bowled especially well in the second Test match, taking a wicket with the first ball of the match. Through the match he was able to control his swing away from right-handed batsmen well enough to create reverse swing, using a new angle by bowling over the wicket thanks to his work with interim coach Allan Donald. He had bowling figures of 5/44 on the first day of the match, which broke the record for the best bowling figures by an Australian fast bowler in Sri Lanka, and the record for best bowling figures by any fast bowler at Galle International Stadium. Among the five wickets he also took his 100th wicket in Test cricket. He took even better bowling figures in the second innings with 6 wickets for 40 runs, though Australia went on to lose the match. In the final Test match, Starc took his third five-wicket haul in three innings, but struggled with deep footholes on the pitch at SSC Cricket Ground. Starc had to adjust his follow-through to avoid the footholes, running further onto the pitch and attracting the attention of the umpires. Starc took 24 wickets across the series, breaking the record for the most wickets for an overseas fast bowlers in a three-Test series in Asia, but Australia lost the Test series 3–0. Starc's success continued into the subsequent ODI series, where he took his 100th ODI wicket in his 52nd match. This made Starc the fastest bowler to reach 100 ODI wickets, breaking a 19-year record previously held by Saqlain Mushtaq. In the 2nd ODI, Starc was officially reprimanded for breaking the ICC Code of Conduct when he again threw the cricket ball at a batsman.

Starc was rested for Australia's tour of South Africa in October 2016, allowing him to prepare for the home summer. Former teammate Mitchell Johnson tipped him to continue breaking records through the 2016/17 season, but during a practice session he had an accidental collision with training equipment and suffered a deep shin laceration. He required 30 stitches, spent four days in hospital, and had to use a knee brace for four weeks to keep his skin in place while it healed. The usual practice for the Australian team at the time was to give fast bowlers six weeks of building up their workload in the lead-up to a Test match, but Starc only had two weeks of bowling before the first Test match of the home summer against South Africa in November when he started preparing. Regardless, Starc played the match despite his wound still being open. The injury meant he bowled slower than usual, but he still took a wicket in the first over of the match and finished the first innings with four wickets. Starc had to bowl 50 overs in the Test match, which Australia lost. This heavy workload made him a high injury risk if he continued to play, but Starc played through the rest of the series, bowling 56 overs in the third match (the most of his first-class career), and also played in the subsequent series against Pakistan. During the Pakistan series, he played in the Boxing Day Test match at the Melbourne Cricket Ground for the first time in his career. Starc was rewarded for his performance and resilience when he won Australia's Men's Test Player of the Year award for 2016. This was the first time in nine years that a bowler had won the award. He was also named in the ICC's Men's Test Team of the Year.

=== 2017–2018 ===
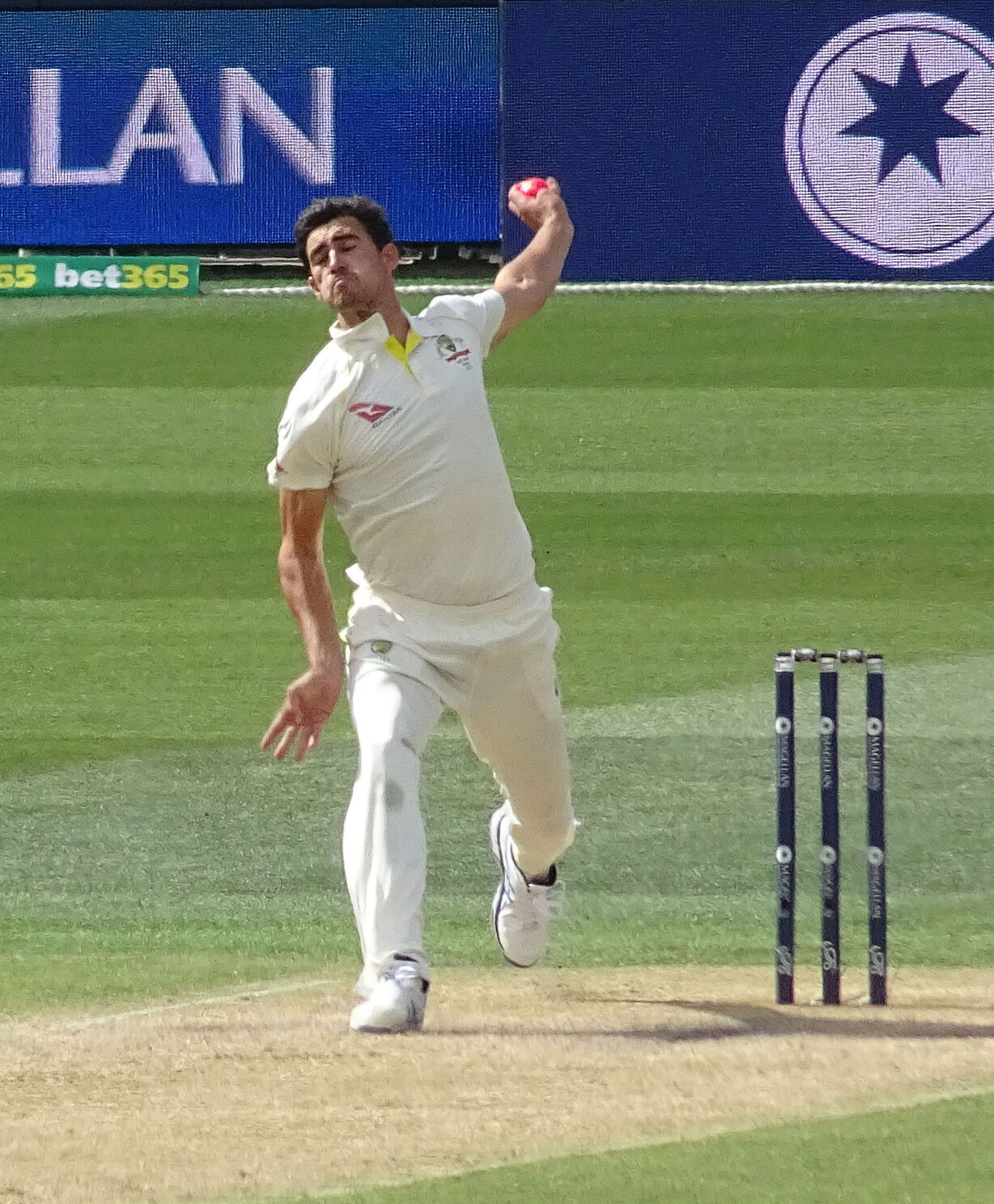
Starc in 2017

In 2017, Starc returned to New Zealand for the first time since the 2015 World Cup in an ODI series against New Zealand, but he wasn't able to recapture his form from 2015. Though his fitness had fully recovered since his most recent foot injury, he was struggling to get the ball to swing like he had previously. He did manage to bowl with swing in the Border–Gavaskar Trophy in India. On the second day of the first Test in the series, he only bowled three short spells of three overs each, but still took two key wickets. Indian commentator Aakash Chopra said that this display showed why he was considered the "best fast bowler in the world", because "he bowled every ball with a single-point agenda of picking wickets". Starc also contributed an important 61 runs with the bat in Australia's first innings, and Australia won the match by 333 runs. This was Australia's first Test match win in India for 4502 days. Having only bowled 11 overs for the match, he left the match much fresher than he had become accustomed to with heavier workloads through his career, but he suffered a stress fracture in his foot in the second match and had to fly home to Australia in the following days, with the hope that he'd recover in time for the 2017 ICC Champions Trophy.

Starc was deemed fit to play in the Champions Trophy, giving Australia a full-strength line-up with Josh Hazlewood, Pat Cummins and James Pattinson all available as well. Australia's first two matches in the tournament were washed out, but Starc was still able to perform well in these games. In Australia's match against Bangladesh, he took four wickets and got on a hat-trick. He took three wickets in a single over without conceding any runs, the first triple-wicket maiden ever bowled in the Champions Trophy. Because their first two matches had no result, Australia needed to win their final match against England to progress to the knockout stage, but they lost the match and were eliminated from the tournament. After the tournament, follow-up scans were taken of Starc's foot and showed that his stress fracture had not fully recovered, so he was ruled out of Australia's tour of Bangladesh in August and September.

Starc returned from this injury to play in the first two rounds of the 2017–18 Sheffield Shield season for New South Wales as a way to prepare for the 2017–18 Ashes series. This turned out to be an incredibly successful two matches for him, as he took career-best figures of 8/73 against South Australia, then became the first bowler to take a hat-trick in each innings of a Sheffield Shield match while playing against Western Australia. It also made him only the second ever player to take 2 hat-tricks in the same Sheffield Shield match since Hal Hooker in 1929. This was both the first time the feat had ever been in achieved in Australia, and the first time it had been achieved anywhere in the world since 1978. He was named player of the match for both performances.

Starc played in the first three matches of the Ashes, with Australia winning all three and regaining the Ashes with two matches remaining, but he suffered a bruised heel in the third match. Leading up to the Boxing Day Test match, he spent days on crutches to take weight off the injured foot, but he decided to withdraw from the match because of the chance of further aggravating the injury. Starc was considered fit enough to play in the final match and the following ODI series, but his bowling was much slower than usual and he didn't pose as much of a threat to England's batsmen.

Starc spent time recovering from his injury before travelling for Australia's 2018 away tour of South Africa, where he had not previously played red-ball cricket. In the first Test match of the series, he took five wickets in the first innings and 4 in the second to achieve match bowling figures of 9 for 109, for which he won the Man of the Match award. He was able to get reverse swing with the ball, owing to the way the abrasive pitch at Kingsmead Cricket Ground roughed up the ball. During the match he engaged in "fiery exchanges" with South African batsman Theunis de Bruyn as well as South African spectators. In the second Test match, Starc came into disagreement with his captain Steve Smith over how to bowl to South African batsman AB de Villiers. Smith directed Starc to bowl "negatively" to de Villiers, who had scored a century, asking him to deliberately bowl the ball down the leg side so that de Villiers couldn't reach it to score runs and keep the strike for the next over. Starc played with a calf problem and bowled poorly during the match, only taking one wicket, which put him in doubt to play in the third Test match. Starc passed a fitness test to play in the third Test match, but he was ruled out of the final match of the series with a stress fracture in his right leg. The series was overshadowed by the 2018 Australian ball-tampering scandal. The Australian team was caught in the third Test match using sandpaper to rough the cricket ball and make it easier to swing, which is against the laws of cricket. (Note: Law 41.3.2 says "It is an offence for any player to take any action which changes the condition of the ball.") On the day that they were caught cheating, Smith claimed that "the leadership group" had come up with the plan together, which would have implicated Starc as he had been a member of the leadership group at various times. Starc was not found to be involved, but Cricket Australia gave Smith a 12-month ban from international and domestic cricket and a subsequent 12-month ban from team leadership positions. Months after the scandal, Starc said that his relationship with Smith had been "strained", but remained "very much intact".

=== 2018–2019 ===
Starc didn't return to competitive cricket until September for Australia's Test series against Pakistan in the United Arab Emirates, giving him his longest break from cricket in more than three years. During his long break, Starc worked with bowling coach David Saker on his bowling action. Because of his frequent injuries and soreness, Starc had adjusted his action to reduce his pain, and as a result he couldn't get the ball to swing as much. He made adjustments to bring his bowling action closer to what it had been in the 2015 World Cup, and in the 2018–19 season he got the ball to swing more again.

Starc struggled for form in the 2018–19 Border–Gavaskar Trophy series against India. His bowling in the first Test match was seen as subpar, putting focus on him to improve. His more consistent bowling in the second match was undone by momentary lapses, and throughout the series he was less effective with the older ball than India's bowlers. During the series Starc faced heavy criticism for his dip in form, including from former Australian Test cricketer Shane Warne. Starc made a deliberate effort to keep the criticism out of his mind and focus on his own bowling, deciding to focus on bowling at high pace instead of swing. This resulted in a return to form in the following Test series against Sri Lanka, where his bowling speed consistently reached 150 km/h. He was instrumental in setting up Australia's series clinching win in the second Test with a ten-wicket haul.

Before the Sri Lanka series, I had a really nice session with Andre Adams who is at NSW. And talking to a few people quite close to me who I have worked with over recent years. And putting the rest of the coaching and the other 450 coaches I've had over the past three weeks to the side. And going back to know what I know best. I am my own best coach and I know what's best for me.

— Starc during the second Test match against Sri Lanka.

Scans after the match revealed that Starc had torn his left pectoral muscle, so he was declared unavailable for Australia's tour of India in February and March 2019. He was set to return for the following ODI series against Pakistan in the UAE, but when he returned to bowling he aggravated his injury again, setting back his recovery. In April 2019, he was named in Australia's squad for the 2019 Cricket World Cup, and he finally returned to cricket during Australia's preparation for the 2019 Cricket World Cup in May. In his first match back, a warm-up match against a team from New Zealand, he only bowled five overs but was already up to his normal pace and took bowling figures of 2/15. He was seen as a very important part of Australia's chances at the World Cup because of his performance in 2015, but his lack of recent match practice but into doubt how well he'd bowl this time.

=== 2019 Cricket World Cup ===
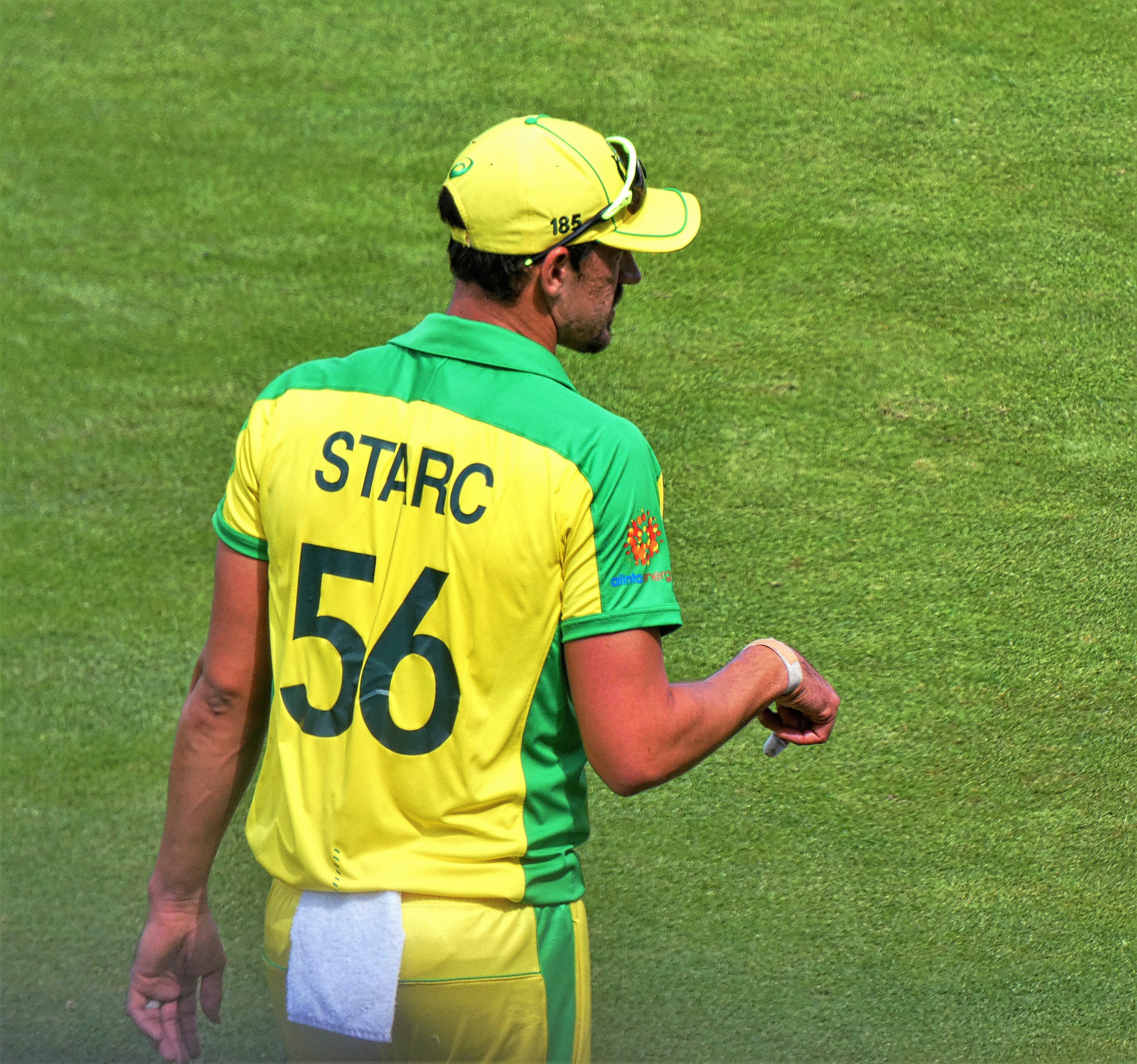
Starc at Trent Bridge during the 2019 World Cup.

Australia's first match of the World Cup was against the West Indies. Starc took five wickets in Australia's 15-run win, including wickets at crucial times of the match to ensure Australia would get across the line. One of his wickets was a controversial dismissal of West Indies batsman Chris Gayle. Umpire Chris Gaffaney judged Gayle to be out twice in one over from Starc's bowling, once caught behind and once leg before wicket (lbw), but on both occasions Gayle used the Decision Review System (DRS) to overturn the umpire's decision. In a later over, Gaffaney again judged Gayle to be out lbw from Starc's bowling, and Gayle again reviewed the decision, but the DRS upheld the umpire's decision this time. Subsequent replays showed that on the delivery before the wicket, Starc had overstepped the popping crease in his delivery stride and bowled a no-ball, which Gaffaney had failed to call. If the no-ball had been called, then the subsequent ball would have been a free hit and Gayle could not have been dismissed lbw. West Indies captain Carlos Brathwaite thought that the umpiring mistake was highly consequential in the match result, saying, "To lose Chris in a chase of 280, who can probably get 180 of them himself obviously, broke the start that we wanted to have." During the game, he also became the quickest bowler, in terms of number of matches, to take 150 wickets in ODIs, doing so in his 77th game (one match quicker than Saqlain Mushtaq, who did it in 78 games).

On 29 June 2019, in the match against New Zealand, Starc became the first bowler to take three five-wicket hauls at the Cricket World Cup. He finished the tournament with 27 dismissals, which is an all-time record for most wickets as an individual in a single World Cup.

=== 2019–2022 ===
In July 2019, Starc was named in Australia's squad for the 2019 Ashes series in England. However, he played only a single game in the series, taking four wickets across two innings, as Australia chose to rotate their fast bowlers over the course of the series.

On 16 July 2020, Starc was named in a 26-man preliminary squad of players to begin training ahead of a possible tour to England following the COVID-19 pandemic. On 14 August 2020, Cricket Australia confirmed that the fixtures would be taking place, with Starc included in the touring party.

In November 2020, Starc was nominated for the ICC Men's ODI Cricketer of the Decade award. The following month, in the second Test against India, Starc took his 250th wicket in Test cricket. In August 2021, in the first match against Bangladesh, Starc became the first bowler for Australia to take 50 wickets in T20I cricket. Later the same month, Starc was named in Australia's squad for the 2021 ICC Men's T20 World Cup. He took nine wickets in seven matches with a bowling average of 27.55.

Starc was named in 2021-22 Ashes series Test squad. He performed throughout the series, with both the ball and bat, scoring runs as a capable lower-order batsman and picked up 19 wickets in 5 matches with a bowling average of 25.36. Starc scored 155 runs with a 38.75 batting average, which assisted the Australian cricket team to retain the Ashes and win the series 4–0.

=== 2023 Cricket World Cup ===
He was part of 2023 Cricket World Cup Winning squad in India. He picked overall 16 wickets in 10 matches played. He played a crucial role in Knockout matches picking 3/34 in semifinal against South Africa and 3/55 in final against India. The spell in league match against New Zealand in Dharmshala became his first wicketless spell in Cricket world cups.

=== 2024 T20 World Cup ===
In May 2024, he was named in Australia's squad for the 2024 ICC Men's T20 World Cup tournament. In the Super-8 match against India, he conceded 29 runs in an over to Rohit Sharma which became his career-most expensive over.

=== 2025–2026 ===
Starc bowling against South Africa in 2026

In July 2025, during Australia's test series win over the West Indies, Starc played his 100th Test and collected his 400th wicket. In the 3rd Test, he took 7 wickets for the match, including a five-wicket haul in 15 balls in the 4th innings, the fastest in history. During that 4th innings, he finished with bowling figures of 6/9, the best bowling figures of his career in regards of bowling average.

On 2 September 2025, Starc announced his retirement from Twenty20 International cricket.

Over the series, Starc took 31 wickets at an average of 19.93, including two seven-wicket hauls. He also scored 156 runs, including two fifties. He was Player of the Match in the first two tests, and awarded the Compton–Miller Medal as the Player of the Series.

During the 1st test match against Bangladesh, Starc became the all time leading wicket taker in tests among left-arm bowlers. During the second test of the same series, Starc took a 5-wicket haul in 22 balls, his second fastest.

== Personal life ==
Starc is of Slovene descent. He is the elder brother of Australian Olympic high jumper Brandon Starc.

In 2015, Starc became engaged to fellow Australian cricketer Alyssa Healy, and they married on 15 April 2016. Starc and Healy were only the third married couple to both play Test cricket, after Roger and Ruth Prideaux, who represented England in the 1950s and 1960s, as well as Guy and Rasanjali de Alwis, who represented Sri Lanka in the 1980s and 1990s. They have since been joined by married women's couples: Katherine and Nat Sciver-Brunt, and Marizanne Kapp and Dane van Niekerk. They met when they were 9, when both were wicketkeepers for Northern Districts. In March 2020, Starc flew home ahead of the final ODI match against South Africa so he could watch Healy play in the final of the 2020 ICC Women's T20 World Cup.

Starc supports the Greater Western Sydney Giants in the Australian Football League. He and his wife Alyssa Healy were named joint number 1 ticket holders of the club in 2025. He also grew up supporting rugby league club the St. George Dragons.

== Honours ==
- 2015 World Cup Player of the Tournament
- ICC Men's Test Team of the Year: 2016, 2017, 2019, 2023, 2025
- ICC Men's ODI Team of the Year: 2013, 2015, 2016, 2019
- ICC Men's ODI Team of the Decade: 2011–2020
- ICC Men's Player of the Month: December 2025
- ICC Cricket World Cup Highest Wicket Taker: 2015, 2019
- Wisden Cricketer of the Year: 2024
- Wisden Leading Cricketer in the World: 2025
- Compton–Miller Medal: 2025–26
- Allan Border Medal: 2022
- Shane Warne Men's Test Player of the Year: 2017
- Australian Men's ODI Player of the Year: 2022
- Marsh One Day Cup Player of the Tournament: 2015–16

== See also ==
- List of international cricket five-wicket hauls by Mitchell Starc

== Notes ==
Awards
Preceded by Yuvraj Singh	World Cup Player of the Series winner 2015	Succeeded by Kane Williamson
Preceded by Steve Smith	Allan Border Medal; 2022	Succeeded by Steve Smith
