= Australian cricket team against Afghanistan in the UAE in 2012 =

International cricket tour

Afghanistan cricket team vs Australia in UAE 2012
	Afghanistan	Australia
- Dates: 25 August 2012 – 26 August 2012
Captains	Nawroz Mangal	Michael Clarke

One Day International series
- Results: Australia won the 1-match series 1–0
Most runs	Michael Clarke (75)	Asghar Afghan (66)
Most wickets	Karim Sadiq (2)	Mitchell Starc (4)
- Player of the series: Mitchell Starc (Aus)

The Afghanistan national cricket team played the Australian national cricket team in a single One Day International (ODI) in the United Arab Emirates during Australia's concurrent series against Pakistan in UAE in August 2012. The match took place on 25 August, and was held at the Sharjah Cricket Stadium. The match was notable for being the first time a One Day International would be played over two days and with both innings starting at night. The match started at 18:00 GST and was scheduled to finish at around 1:45 during the morning of the 26th. It was also Afghanistan's second ODI against a full member of the International Cricket Council, following their one off ODI earlier in the year against Pakistan, and their first meeting in any format against Australia. Australia won this first meeting between the sides by 66 runs.

== Squads ==
Afghanistan	Australia
Nawroz Mangal (c); Asghar Afghan; Dawlat Zadran; Gulbadin Naib; Izatullah Dawlatzai; Javed Ahmadi; Karim Sadiq; Mohammad Nabi; Sami Agha; Mohammad Shahzad (wk); Najibullah Zadran; Noor Ali Zadran; Rahmat Shah; Samiullah Shinwari; Shapoor Zadran	Michael Clarke (c); George Bailey; Dan Christian; Xavier Doherty; Callum Ferguson; David Hussey; Michael Hussey; Mitchell Johnson; Clint McKay; Glenn Maxwell; James Pattinson; Steven Smith; Mitchell Starc; Matthew Wade (wk); David Warner

== ODI series ==
=== Only ODI ===
25 August 2012
Scorecard

Australia; 272/8 (50 overs)	v	Afghanistan; 206 (43.5 overs)
Michael Clarke 75 (94); Karim Sadiq 2/22 (6 overs)		Asghar Afghan 66 (106); Mitchell Starc 4/47 (9 overs)

Australia won by 66 runs
Sharjah Cricket Stadium, Sharjah
Umpires: Billy Bowden (NZL) and Shozab Raza (Pak)
Player of the match: Mitchell Starc (Aus)

- Australia won the toss and elected to bat.
- Glenn Maxwell (Aus) made his ODI debut.
