= West Indian cricket team in Australia in 2012–13 =

International cricket tour

	Australia	West Indies
- Dates: 29 January 2013 – 13 February 2013

One Day International series
- Results: Australia won the 5-match series 5–0
Most runs	Shane Watson (198)	Kieron Pollard (164)
Most wickets	Mitchell Starc (11)	Darren Sammy (5); Sunil Narine (5)
- Player of the series: Mitchell Starc (Aus)

Twenty20 International series
- Results: West Indies won the 1-match series 1–0
Most runs	Adam Voges (51)	Johnson Charles (57)
Most wickets	James Faulkner (3)	Kieron Pollard (3)

The West Indies cricket team toured Australia from 29 January 2013 to 13 February 2013. The tour consisted of five One Day Internationals (ODI's) and a single Twenty20 International (T20I's). These matches were preceded by a match featuring the Prime Minister's XI and the West Indians.

== Squads ==
ODIs		T20Is	
Australia	West Indies	Australia	West Indies
Michael Clarke (c); George Bailey; Nathan Coulter-Nile; Ben Cutting; Xavier Doherty; James Faulkner; Aaron Finch; Brad Haddin (wk); Phillip Hughes; Mitchell Johnson; Usman Khawaja; Clint McKay; Glenn Maxwell; Mitchell Starc; Adam Voges; Matthew Wade (wk); Shane Watson; David Warner	Darren Sammy (c); Dwayne Bravo (vc); Tino Best; Darren Bravo; Johnson Charles (wk); Narsingh Deonarine; Chris Gayle; Jason Holder; Sunil Narine; Kieron Pollard; Kieran Powell; Kemar Roach; Andre Russell; Ramnaresh Sarwan; Devon Thomas	George Bailey (c); Joe Burns; Nathan Coulter-Nile; Ben Cutting; James Faulkner; Aaron Finch; Brad Haddin (vc); Josh Hazlewood; Ben Laughlin; Clint McKay; Shaun Marsh; Ben Rohrer; Adam Voges	West Indies used the same squad from the ODI's for the Twenty20

== Tour matches ==
29 January 2013 (D/N)
Scorecard

Prime Minister's XI; 6/333 (50 overs)	v	West Indians; 310 (49 overs)
Alex Doolan 87 (98); Sunil Narine 2/32 (10 overs)		Kieran Powell 92 (97); James Faulkner 4/54 (10 overs)

Prime Minister's XI won by 23 runs
Manuka Oval, Canberra
Umpires: Stuart Grocock (Aus) and Tony Ward (Aus)
Player of the match: James Faulkner (PM's XI)

- Prime Minister's XI won the toss and elected to bat
- Kieran Powell (WI) retired hurt due to cramp in the 30th over of the West Indies' innings.

== ODI series ==
=== 1st ODI ===
1 February 2013 (D/N)
Scorecard

West Indies; 70 (23.5 overs)	v	Australia; 1/71 (9.2 overs)
Darren Sammy 16 (37); Mitchell Starc 5/20 (6.5 overs)		Glenn Maxwell 51* (35); Jason Holder 1/18 (4.2 overs)

Australia won by 9 wickets
WACA Ground, Perth
Umpires: Asad Rauf (Pak) and Paul Reiffel (Aus)
Player of the match: Mitchell Starc (Australia)

- West Indies won the toss and elected to bat
- ODI debuts: James Faulkner (Aus) and Jason Holder (WI)

=== 2nd ODI ===
3 February 2013 (D/N)
Scorecard

Australia; 7/266 (50 overs)	v	West Indies; 212 (38.1 overs)
George Bailey 125* (110); Darren Sammy 3/48 (10 overs)		Kieran Powell 83 (90); Mitchell Starc 5/32 (8 overs)

Australia won by 54 runs
WACA Ground, Perth
Umpires: Nigel Llong (England) and Paul Reiffel (Australia)
Player of the match: George Bailey (Australia)

- West Indies won the toss and elected to field.
- George Bailey scored his maiden international century.

=== 3rd ODI ===
6 February 2013 (D/N)
Scorecard

Australia; 7/329 (50 overs)	v	West Indies; 290 (47.3 overs)
Shane Watson 122 (111); Darren Sammy 2/49 (8 overs)		Darren Bravo 86 (96); James Faulkner 4/48 (8.3 overs)

Australia won by 39 runs
Manuka Oval, Canberra
Umpires: Asad Rauf (Pakistan) and Simon Fry (Australia)
Player of the match: Shane Watson (Australia)

- Australia won the toss and elected to bat

=== 4th ODI ===
8 February 2013 (D/N)
Scorecard

West Indies; 220 (49.4 overs)	v	Australia; 5/221 (44.5 overs)
Kieron Pollard 109* (136); Mitchell Johnson 3/36 (10 overs)		Shane Watson 76 (84); Sunil Narine 2/34 (10 overs)

Australia won by 5 wickets
Sydney Cricket Ground, Sydney
Umpires: Simon Fry (Australia) and Nigel Llong (England)
Player of the match: Kieron Pollard (West Indies)

- West Indies won the toss and elected to bat

=== 5th ODI ===
10 February 2013 (D/N)
Scorecard

Australia; 5/274 (50 overs)	v	West Indies; 257 (49.5 overs)
Adam Voges 112 (106); Dwayne Bravo 2/62 (8 overs)		Johnson Charles 100 (121); Mitchell Johnson 3/50 (10 overs)

Australia won by 17 runs
Melbourne Cricket Ground, Melbourne
Umpires: Asad Rauf (Pak) & Paul Reiffel (Aus)
Player of the match: Adam Voges (Australia)

- West Indies won the toss and elected to field
- Adam Voges scored his maiden international century.

== Twenty20 series ==
=== Only T20I ===
13 February 2013 (D/N)
Scorecard

West Indies; 6/191 (20 overs)	v	Australia; 8/164 (20 overs)
Johnson Charles 57 (35); James Faulkner 3/28 (4 overs)		Adam Voges 51 (33); Kieron Pollard 3/30 (4 overs)

West Indies won by 27 runs
The Gabba, Brisbane
Umpires: Paul Reiffel (Australia) and John Ward (Australia)
Player of the match: Kieron Pollard (West Indies)

- West Indies won the toss and elected to bat.
- Nathan Coulter-Nile, Josh Hazlewood, Ben Rohrer (Australia), and Tino Best (West Indies) made their T20I debuts.

== Statistics ==
=== Australia ===
ODI's

- James Faulkner took his first ODI wicket when he dismissed Devon Thomas in the 1st ODI.
- Mitchell Starc took his second ODI 5-wicket haul in the 1st ODI.
- George Bailey scored his maiden international century in the 2nd ODI.
- Adam Voges scored his maiden international century in the 5th ODI.

T20I's

=== West Indies ===
ODI's

- Jason Holder took his first ODI wicket when he dismissed Aaron Finch in the 1st ODI.

T20I's

== Broadcasters ==
Country	TV Broadcaster(s)
Australia	Nine Network
Australia	Fox Sports
United Kingdom	Sky Sports
Pakistan	PTV Sports
India	STAR Cricket
South Africa	SuperSport
