= Australian cricket team against Pakistan in the UAE in 2014–15 =

Cricket tournament between Pakistan and Australia in 2015

Australia cricket team in United Arab Emirates in 2014–15
| | Pakistan | Australia |
- Dates: 5 October – 3 November 2014
| Captains | Shahid Afridi (T20I); Misbah-ul-Haq (Tests & ODIs) | Aaron Finch (T20I); George Bailey (ODIs); Michael Clarke (Tests) |

Test series
- Result: Pakistan won the 2-match series 2–0
| Most runs | Younis Khan (468) | David Warner (239) |
| Most wickets | Zulfiqar Babar (14) | Mitchell Johnson (6) |
- Player of the series: Younis Khan (Pak)

One Day International series
- Results: Australia won the 3-match series 3–0
| Most runs | Sarfraz Ahmed (131) | Steve Smith (190) |
| Most wickets | Shahid Afridi (5) | Mitchell Johnson (6) |
- Player of the series: Steve Smith (Aus)

Twenty20 International series
- Results: Australia won the 1-match series 1–0
| Most runs | Saad Nasim (25) | David Warner (54) |
| Most wickets | Raza Hasan (2) | Glenn Maxwell (3) |
- Player of the series: Glenn Maxwell (Aus)

Australia cricket team toured the United Arab Emirates (UAE) from 5 October to 3 November 2014 and played one Twenty20 International (T20I), three One Day Internationals (ODIs) and two Test matches against Pakistan. It was a home series for Pakistan, which was played in the UAE owing to ongoing security concerns in Pakistan. The limited over matches were dominated by Australia while a rampant Pakistan whitewashed the Test series.

== Squads ==
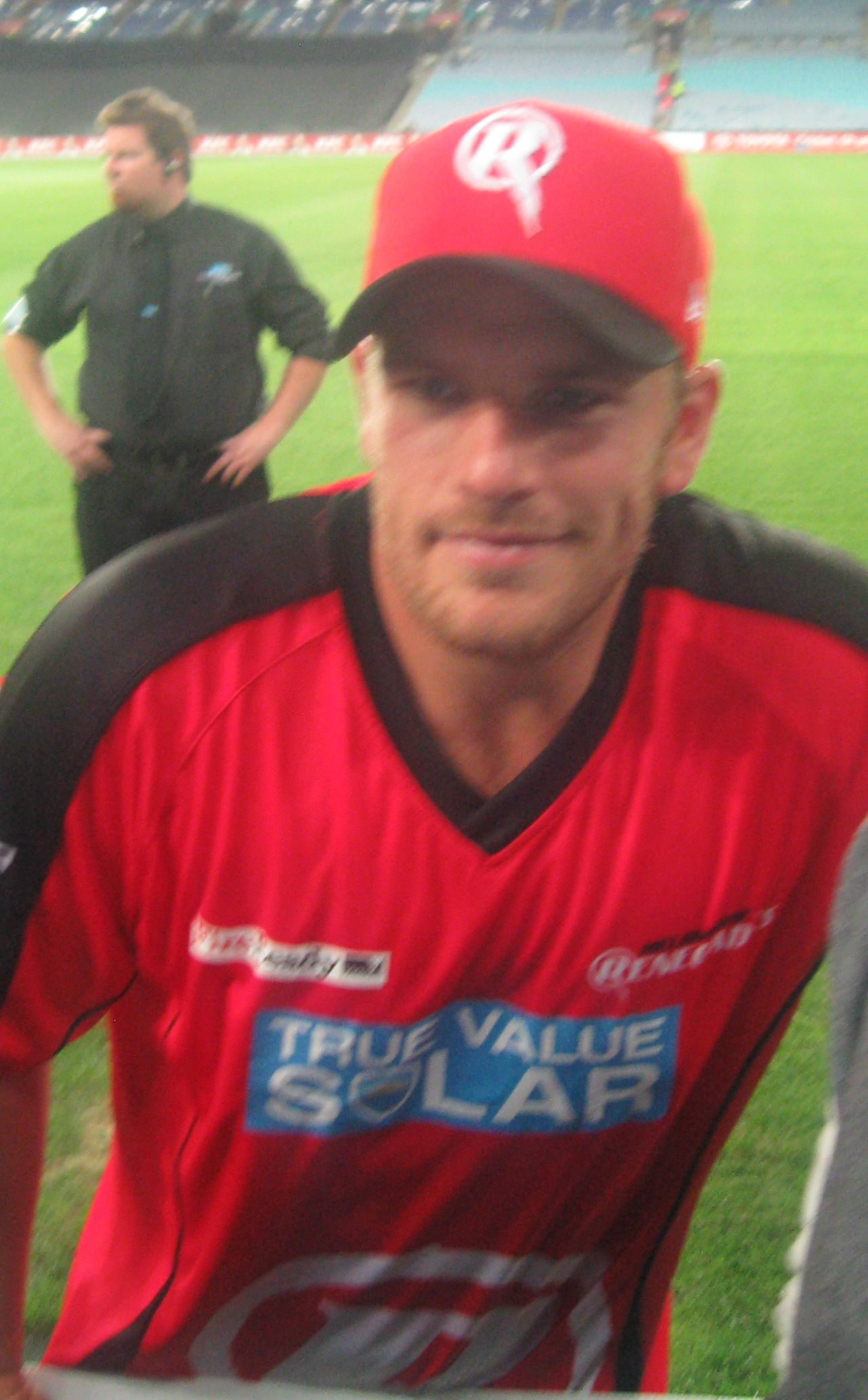
Aaron Finch succeeded George Bailey as captain in the T20I.

| T20I | | ODIs | | Tests | |
| Pakistan | Australia | Pakistan | Australia | Pakistan | Australia |
|---|---|---|---|---|---|
| Shahid Afridi (C); Ahmed Shehzad; Umar Akmal; Umar Amin; Sohaib Maqsood; Awais Zia; Saad Nasim; Raza Hasan; Mohammad Irfan; Wahab Riaz; Bilawal Bhatti; Sami Aslam; Zulfiqar Babar; Anwar Ali; Sohail Tanvir | Aaron Finch (C); Sean Abbott; Cameron Boyce; Pat Cummins; James Faulkner; Glenn Maxwell; Brad Haddin (wk); Phillip Hughes; Mitchell Marsh; Kane Richardson; Steve Smith; Mitchell Starc; David Warner | Misbah-ul-Haq (C); Ahmed Shehzad; Umar Akmal; Fawad Alam; Umar Amin; Shan Masood; Asad Shafiq; Sarfraz Ahmed (wk); Shahid Afridi; Raza Hasan; Mohammad Irfan; Anwar Ali; Wahab Riaz; Sami Aslam; Sohail Tanvir; Zulfiqar Babar; Junaid Khan (Withdrawn) | George Bailey (C); Sean Abbott; Xavier Doherty; James Faulkner; Aaron Finch; Brad Haddin (wk); Phillip Hughes; Mitchell Johnson; Nathan Lyon; Mitchell Marsh; Kane Richardson; Steve Smith; Mitchell Starc; David Warner | Misbah-ul-Haq (C); Ahmed Shehzad; Asad Shafiq; Azhar Ali; Ehsan Adil; Haris Sohail; Imran Khan; Mohammad Hafeez; Mohammad Talha; Rahat Ali; Sarfraz Ahmed (WK); Shan Masood; Taufeeq Umar; Yasir Shah; Younus Khan; Zulfiqar Babar | Michael Clarke (C); Alex Doolan; James Faulkner; Brad Haddin (wk); Ben Hilfenhaus; Phillip Hughes; Mitchell Johnson; Mitchell Marsh; Glenn Maxwell; Nathan Lyon; Steve O'Keefe; Chris Rogers; Peter Siddle; Steve Smith; Mitchell Starc; David Warner |

== Tour matches ==
=== Warm-Up: Pakistan A vs Australians ===
15–18 October 2014
Scorecard

| Pakistan A | v | Australians |
| 305/8d (90 overs); Asad Shafiq 108* (156); Steve O'Keefe 3/76 (23 overs) | | 273/8d (90 overs); Alex Doolan 104 (194); Ehsan Adil 1/14 (6 overs) |
| 306/3d (90 overs); Babar Azam 114 (178); Nathan Lyon 2/49 (17 overs) | | 185 (51.3 overs); Phillip Hughes 65 (107); Mohammad Talha 3/32 (8.3 overs) |

Pakistan A won by 153 runs
Sharjah Cricket Stadium
Umpires: Ahsan Raza (Pak) and Shozab Raza (Pak)

- Pakistan A won the toss and elected to bat
- Match was 90 overs per innings with 14 players involved. However, only 11 could bat or field at a time.
- Saqlain Haider of the United Arab Emirates kept wickets for Brad Haddin on day 3.

== T20I series ==
=== Only T20I ===
5 October 2014
20:00 (D/N)
Scorecard

| Pakistan; 96/9 (20 overs) | v | Australia; 98/4 (14 overs) |
| Saad Nasim 25 (32); Glenn Maxwell 3/13 (3 overs) | | David Warner 54* (39); Raza Hasan 2/17 (4 overs) |

Australia won by 6 wickets (with 36 balls remaining)
Dubai International Cricket Stadium
Umpires: Ahsan Raza (Pak) and Shozab Raza (Pak)
Player of the match: Glenn Maxwell (Aus)

- Pakistan won the toss and chose to bat
- Sean Abbott, Cameron Boyce, Phillip Hughes & Kane Richardson (Aus) and Saad Nasim (Pak) made their T20I debuts

In Aaron Finch's debut match as captain Australia restricted Pakistan to an ordinary 96/9 on a slow turner with Glenn Maxwell (3/13 off 3 overs) and debutant Cameron Boyce (2/10 off 4 overs) being the chief wicket takers. Australia's reply got off to a shaky start, at one point 56/4 but David Warner (54*) steadied the innings, eventually comfortably winning the game by 6 wickets.

== ODI series ==
=== 1st ODI ===
7 October 2014
15:00 (D/N)
Scorecard

| Australia; 255/8 (50 overs) | v | Pakistan; 162 (38.3 overs) |
| Steve Smith 101 (118); Shahid Afridi 3/46 (10 overs) | | Umar Akmal 46 (57); Mitchell Johnson 3/24 (7 overs) |

Australia won by 93 runs
Sharjah Cricket Stadium
Umpires: Ahsan Raza (Pak) and Richard Illingworth (Eng)
Player of the match: Steve Smith (Aus)

- Australia won the toss and chose to bat.
- Sean Abbott (Aus) and Zulfiqar Babar (Pak) made their ODI debuts.
- Steve Smith (Aus) scored his first century in ODIs.

Aaron Finch (0) was caught first ball after slicing a ball to Ahmed Shehzad at point. But David Warner (43) and Steve Smith (101) put on an 86 run partnership to steady the tourists. Australia ended up with 255/8 with Steve Smith scoring his maiden ODI century. Shahid Afridi (3/46) was the best bowler for Pakistan. In response, Australia bowled very well as Pakistan lost wickets at regular intervals with no batsmen scoring over 43. Mitchell Johnson (3/24) was the main wicket taker for Australia. In an unusual side note, Fawad Alam caused minor controversy mostly on social media when he bowled with his cap facing backwards.

=== 2nd ODI ===
10 October 2014
15:00 (D/N)
Scorecard

| Pakistan; 215 (49.3 overs) | v | Australia; 217/5 (43.2 overs) |
| Sarfraz Ahmed 65 (72); Mitchell Johnson 3/40 (10 overs) | | Glenn Maxwell 76 (81); Zulfiqar Babar 2/52 (10 overs) |

Australia won by 5 wickets (with 40 balls remaining)
Dubai International Cricket Stadium
Umpires: Nigel Llong (Eng) and Shozab Raza (Pak)
Player of the match: Glenn Maxwell (Aus)

- Pakistan won the toss and chose to bat.
- Raza Hasan (Pak) made his ODI debut.

Pakistan made the perfect start to their innings with a steady 126 run opening partnership between Ahmed Shehzad (61) and Sarfraz Ahmed (65). But after both openers went in quick succession Pakistan collapsed to 215 (49.3 overs) with Mitchell Johnson continuing his form from the last match taking 3/40. In reply, Australia lost early wickets but steadied and reached the target with 40 balls remaining. Glenn Maxwell was their top run scorer with a quick knock of 76.

=== 3rd ODI ===
12 October 2014
15:00 (D/N)
Scorecard

| Australia; 231/9 (50 overs) | v | Pakistan; 230 (50 overs) |
| Steve Smith 77 (105); Sohail Tanvir 3/40 (10 overs) | | Asad Shafiq 50 (73); Kane Richardson 2/36 (10 overs) |

Australia won by 1 run
Sheikh Zayed Stadium, Abu Dhabi
Umpires: Ahsan Raza (Pak) and Richard Illingworth (Eng)
Player of the match: Glenn Maxwell (Aus)

- Australia won the toss and chose to bat.
- Phillip Hughes (Aus) played his last international cricket match before his death.

Australia elected to rest Mitchell Johnson and Nathan Lyon. Steve Smith yet again starred with the bat with a patient 77 off 105 balls. David Warner (56) also chipped in to record his first half century of the series. Sohail Tanvir (3/40) was the main wicket taker for Pakistan. In reply, Pakistan seemed to have the match all but won when they needed 2 runs of the final over but Glenn Maxwell (2/41) completed a double wicket maiden earning him man of the match honors. Steve Smith's catch to dismiss Fawad Alam was controversial: Smith lined up at slip, and began moving towards the leg side after the ball was delivered but before it was hit, before taking the catch off Fawad's sweep shot at leg slip; the umpires had the discretion under the laws of the game to declare it a dead ball if they believed Smith's movement was unfair, but they decided it was fair and gave Fawad out, which some commentators disagreed with.

In addition to clean sweeping the series, Australia regained the number 1 ranking for ODIs.

== Test series ==
=== 1st Test ===
22 – 26 October 2014
Scorecard

| Pakistan | v | Australia |
| 454 (145 overs); Sarfraz Ahmed 109 (105); Mitchell Johnson 3/39 (31 overs) | | 303 (103.1 overs); David Warner 133 (174); Yasir Shah 3/66 (16.3 overs) |
| 286/2d (78 overs); Ahmed Shehzad 131 (233); Stephen O'Keefe 2/112 (27 overs) | | 216 (91.1 overs); Mitchell Johnson 61 (127); Zulfiqar Babar 5/74 (31.1 overs) |

Pakistan won by 221 runs
Dubai International Cricket Stadium
Umpires: Marais Erasmus (SA) and Richard Kettleborough (Eng)
Player of the match: Younis Khan (Pak)

- Pakistan won the toss and elected to bat.
- Mitchell Marsh and Stephen O'Keefe (Aus) and Imran Khan and Yasir Shah (Pak) made their Test debuts.
- Younis Khan became the all-time leading century maker for Pakistan in the second innings.

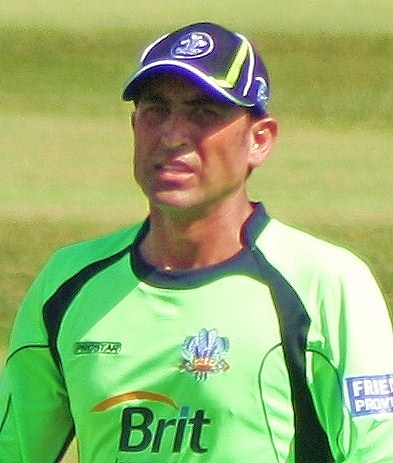
Younus Khan's twin centuries helped him become the all-time leading century maker for Pakistan. He would score a double-hundred in the next match.

Pakistan won the toss and chose to bat in what was tipped to be a pitch that would gradually deteriorate. Mitchell Johnson and Peter Siddle removed the Pakistani openers, Mohammad Hafeez (0) and Ahmed Shehzad (3), in the first few overs. However, Pakistan steadied to end the day at 219/4 with Younus Khan hitting 106 off 223 balls. Mitchell Johnson did the bulk of the damage with an economical 3/22 off 20 overs on a slow and attritional day.

On the second day, Pakistan slowly began to accelerate with Sarfraz Ahmed (109) scoring his second century in Tests at over a-run-a-ball. Australia's reply began well with David Warner reaching his fifty. They ended the day at a solid 113/0.

Australia began their innings slowly on day three and struggled against Pakistan's inexperienced bowling attack, getting bowled out for 303, with debutant Yasir Shah (3/66) the pick of the bowlers while David Warner scored completed his century (133). The match was called off due to bad light at the end of the day with 2 overs remaining.

Australian debutant Stephen O'Keefe took the early wicket of Azhar Ali (30) early on day 4. But Pakistan dominated and eventually declared their innings at 286/2. Australia's second innings began well, but the spinners took quick wickets to leave Australia in trouble at 59/4 at the end of day 4.

Australia lost 3 wickets in the first session with Zulfiqar Babar doing most of the damage on day five. Australia managed to grind their way to the final session but succumbed to a 221 run defeat. He took his maiden five-wicket haul in the second Australian innings. Johnson (61) and Steve Smith (55) were Australia's top scorers. Khan's twin centuries in the match earned him the man of the match award.

=== 2nd Test ===
30 October – 3 November 2014
Scorecard

| Pakistan | v | Australia |
| 570/6d (153 overs); Younus Khan 213 (349); Mitchell Starc 2/86 (27 overs) | | 261 (67.2 overs); Mitchell Marsh 87 (116); Imran Khan 3/60 (14 overs) |
| 293/3d (60.4 overs); Misbah-ul-Haq 101* (57); Mitchell Johnson 2/45 (7 overs) | | 246 (88.3 overs); Steve Smith 97 (204); Zulfiqar Babar 5/120 (32.2 overs) |

Pakistan won by 356 runs
Sheikh Zayed Cricket Stadium, Abu Dhabi
Umpires: Richard Kettleborough (Eng) and Nigel Llong (Eng)
Player of the match: Misbah-ul-Haq (Pak)

- Pakistan won the toss and elected to bat.
- Younus Khan scored his 8000th test run in the first innings.
- In the second innings, Misbah-ul-Haq broke the all-time Test record for the fastest fifty (21 balls) and equaled the record for the fastest hundred (56 balls).
- Pakistan set a new record for its highest winning margin by runs against any opposition in its history.

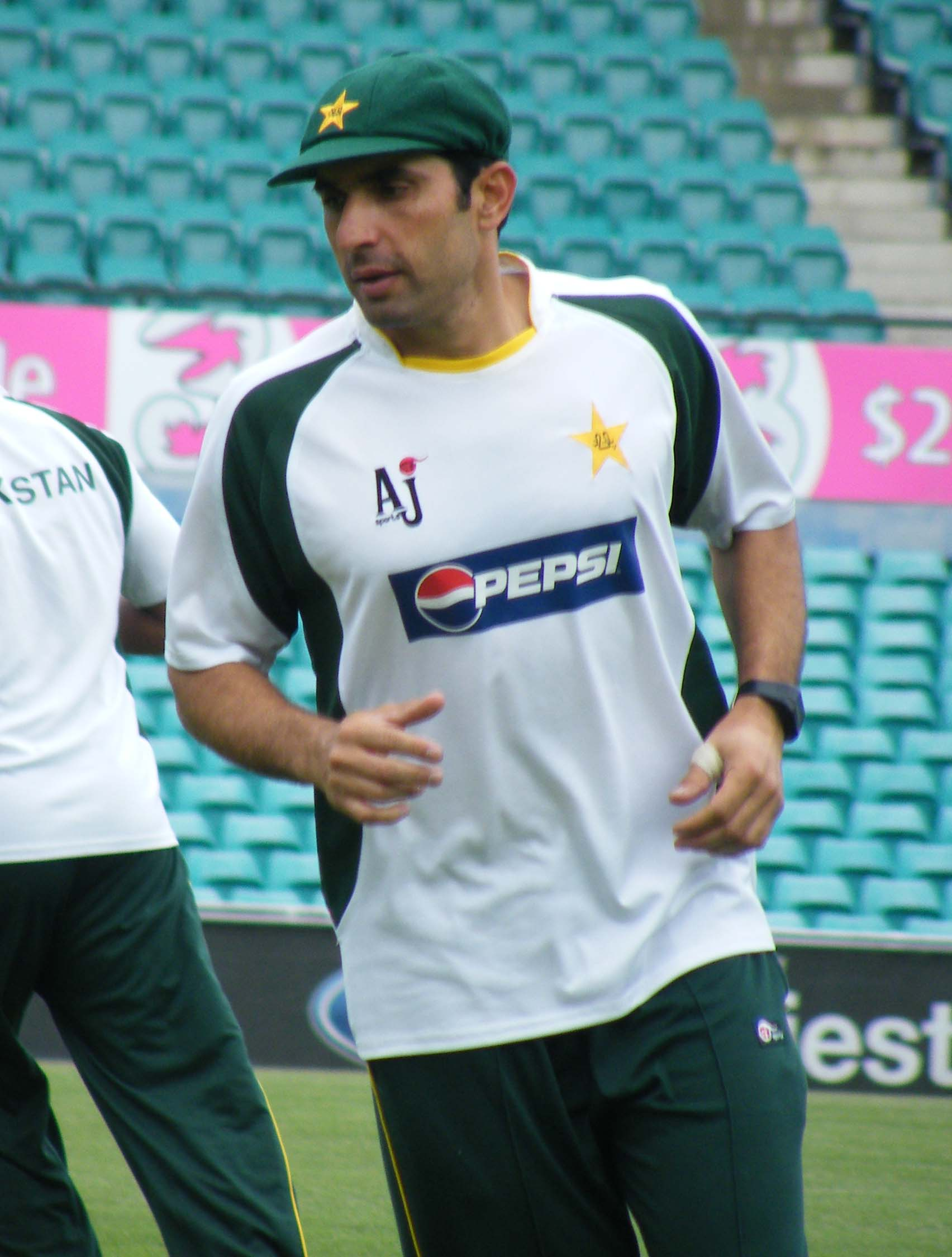
Mishbah-ul-Haq's smashed a 56 ball hundred equaling Sir Vivian Richards record set in 1986. He was dropped by Peter Siddle on his second ball.

Pakistan opted to have an unchanged team after they won the toss and decided to bat. Australia made two changes, with Alex Doolan replaced by Glenn Maxwell for his third test and Stephen O'Keefe replaced by Mitchell Starc. On another flat deck Pakistan made excellent progress with only two wickets, those of the openers Ahmed Shehzad (35) and Mohammad Hafeez (45), falling on day 1. At stumps, they were 304/2, with Younus Khan (111*) scoring his third consecutive century, and Azhar Ali (101*) was the other centurion. Mitchell Johnson (1/50) and Nathan Lyon (1/86) both took a wicket each. Due to bad light, play was suspended with 2 overs still to be bowled. Michael Clarke's unusual field positions, particularly placing Johnson at straight hit (behind the beginning of the bowler's run-up) were criticized by some commentators as not being in the "spirit of the game".

Within the first hour of the second day Australia finally struck with Starc taking the wicket of Azhar (109) caught by replacement wicket-keeper David Warner after Brad Haddin injured his right shoulder in a catching attempt. Pakistan continued to subdue the Australians finishing at 405/3 at lunch on an extended first session. Pakistan continued to pile on the runs in the second session with Younus reaching his double century and captain Misbah-ul-Haq (101) getting his century. Pakistan made accelerated in the third session, scoring some quick runs before declaring at a massive 570/6. Starc was the top wicket-taker with 2/86 (27 overs). Australia had to negotiate 5.2 overs before bad light stopped play, ending the day at 22/1.

Most of Australia's batsmen started well but they lost wickets at regular intervals on day 3 before finishing at a modest 261 all out just after tea. Mitchell Marsh top scored for Australia with 87. All of the Pakistani bowlers took wickets with Imran Khan (3/60) taking the most wickets. Pakistan led by 307 runs, but did not enforce the follow-on. Johnson removed the openers early in the innings and Pakistan finished at 61/2 before bad light once again stopped play.

Pakistan continued their dominance in the first session of day 4 scoring 149 runs with the loss of one wicket, that of Younus (46). Misbah smashed a 21 ball fifty that broke the record for the fastest fifty in Test cricket beating Jacques Kallis's 24 ball effort. After lunch, Maxwell took over the wicket-keeping role while Misbah (101*) equaled the fastest century in Tests with Sir Vivian Richards, coming from 56 deliveries. Azhar (100*) also completed his ton shortly after and Pakistan declared. Zulfiqar Babar took two Australian wickets before tea, those of Chris Rogers (2) and Maxwell (4). Pakistan took three more wickets before the close of play, with Steve Smith (38*) and Marsh (26*) still at the crease.

Smith and Marsh extended their partnership in the first session on day 5 until Marsh was caught at leg slip for 47. Smith continued to bat steadily as Australia reached 238/5 at lunch. But Smith was sent lbw by Yasir Shah for 97 second ball after lunch and Australia collapsed, losing their final five wickets just for eight runs. Pakistan won the series 2–0, their first series win against Australia since 1994. Zulfiqar was the best of the bowlers, taking his second five-wicket haul of the series (5/120 of 32.2 overs). Misbah was awarded the man of the match for his record-breaking century.
