= Raza Hasan =

Pakistani cricketer (born 1992)

Personal information
- Full name: Raza Hasan
- Born: 8 July 1992 (age 34); Sialkot, Punjab, Pakistan
- Batting: Right-handed
- Bowling: Slow left-arm orthodox
- Role: Bowler

International information
- National side: Pakistan (2012–2014)
- Only ODI (cap 199): 10 October 2014 v Australia
- ODI shirt no.: 100
- T20I debut (cap 49): 5 September 2012 v Australia
- Last T20I: 5 December 2014 v New Zealand
- T20I shirt no.: 100

Domestic team information
- Years: Team
- 2018–: Lahore Qalandars

Career statistics
Competition	ODI	T20I	FC	LA
Matches	1	10	29	43
Runs scored	0	18	413	125
Batting average	0.00	–	17.20	7.35
100s/50s	0/0	0/0	0/3	0/0
Top score	0	13*	57	28*
Balls bowled	60	228	5,278	2,300
Wickets	1	10	83	72
Bowling average	68.00	21.90	27.24	22.25
5 wickets in innings	0	0	3	2
10 wickets in match	0	0	1	0
Best bowling	1/68	2/14	5/68	6/14
Catches/stumpings	0/–	2/–	15/–	13/–
Medal record
Representing Pakistan
Men's Cricket
Asian Games
Bronze medal – third place	2010 Guangzhou	Team
- Source: Cricinfo, 5 December 2014

Raza Hasan (Urdu: رضا حسن; born 8 July 1992) is a Pakistani former cricketer. He was selected to play for the Pakistani national team in place of Danish Kaneria for the tour of England in 2010, along with another spinner, Saeed Ajmal. Along with Hasan, another change to the test squad was the addition of veteran Mohammad Yousuf, who retired earlier in the year. Raza was backed by Ijaz Ahmed at the start of his career.

In September 2012, Hasan made his T20 international debut when he played against Australia in the first game of the Australia-Pakistan T20 series in the UAE. He got two wickets in the match.

He made his One Day International debut for Pakistan against Australia in the United Arab Emirates on 10 October 2014.

In May 2015, Hasan was banned from playing any form of cricket for two years, after testing positive for a prohibited substance.

He was the leading wicket-taker for National Bank of Pakistan in the 2017–18 Quaid-e-Azam Trophy, with 32 dismissals in seven matches.

In April 2018, he was named in Federal Areas' squad for the 2018 Pakistan Cup.
