= Carlton Mid Triangular Series in Australia in 2014–15 =

Cricket tournament held in Australia

2014–15 Carlton Mid Triangular Series
- 2015 Carlton Mid Triangular Series logo
- Date: 16 January 2015 – 1 February 2015
- Location: Australia
- Result: Australia (beat England by 112 runs in the final)
- Player of the series: Mitchell Starc (Aus)
Teams
Australia	England	India
Captains
George Bailey	Eoin Morgan	MS Dhoni
Most runs
Steve Smith (226)	Ian Bell (247)	Ajinkya Rahane (146)
Most wickets
Mitchell Starc (12)	Steven Finn (11)	Stuart Binny (4)

The 2015 Carlton Mid Triangular Series was a tri-nation One Day International cricket tournament held in Australia and featuring Australia, England and India. Australia defeated England by 112 runs in the final to claim their 20th Australian Tri-Series title.

Unlike previous Australian tri-nation ODI series, each team played the others only twice during the round-robin stage (instead of the typical four times), and the final was staged as a single match rather than as a best-of-three, in order to accommodate the 2015 Cricket World Cup which immediately followed the series. In February 2015, during the Cricket World Cup, India's team director Ravi Shastri criticised the scheduling of the tri-series saying it was a "sheer waste of time and energy."

== Squads ==
Australia	England	India
George Bailey (c) ^{1}; Steve Smith (vc); Pat Cummins; Xavier Doherty; James Faulkner; Aaron Finch; Brad Haddin (wk); Josh Hazlewood; Moises Henriques ^{3}; Mitchell Johnson; Mitchell Marsh; Shaun Marsh ^{2}; Glenn Maxwell; Kane Richardson; Gurinder Sandhu; Mitchell Starc; David Warner ^{2}; Shane Watson ^{3}; Cameron White ^{2}	Eoin Morgan (c); Moeen Ali; James Anderson; Gary Ballance; Ian Bell; Ravi Bopara; Stuart Broad; Jos Buttler (wk); Steven Finn; Alex Hales; Chris Jordan; Joe Root; James Taylor; James Tredwell; Chris Woakes	MS Dhoni (c & wk); Virat Kohli (vc); Ravichandran Ashwin; Stuart Binny; Shikhar Dhawan; Ravindra Jadeja; Dhawal Kulkarni; Bhuvneshwar Kumar; Axar Patel; Ajinkya Rahane; Suresh Raina; Ambati Rayudu (wk); Mohammed Shami; Ishant Sharma; Mohit Sharma; Rohit Sharma; Umesh Yadav

^{1} Australian captain George Bailey was suspended for one match after Match 2 for a slow over-rate. Steve Smith replaced Bailey as captain for Match 4 in Hobart.
^{2} David Warner was rested for Match 4 in Hobart; as a result, Shaun Marsh and Cameron White were added to the squad.
^{3} Shane Watson was ruled out of Match 4 with hamstring tightness, so Moises Henriques was added to the squad for that match.

== Tour matches ==
=== 50 over: England XI v ACT Invitational XI ===
12 January 2015
10:00
Scorecard

England XI; 6/364 (50 overs)	v	ACT Invitational XI; 148 (32.4 overs)
Ravi Bopara 56* (27); Shane Devoy 2/55 (9 overs)		Matthew Condon 36 (38); James Tredwell 3/11 (4 overs)

England won by 216 runs
Manuka Oval, Canberra
Umpires: Andrew Cleghorn (Aus) and Yohan Ramasundara (Aus)

- England won the toss and elected to bat.
- 15 players per side (11 batting, 11 fielding)

=== 50 over: England XI v Prime Minister's XI ===
14 January 2015
14:20
Scorecard

England XI; 6/391 (50 overs)	v	Prime Minister's XI; 331 (48.1 overs)
Ian Bell 187 (145); Jason Behrendorff 4/79 (10 overs)		Glenn Maxwell 136 (89); Stuart Broad 4/40 (8.1 overs)

England won by 60 runs
Manuka Oval, Canberra
Umpires: Bruce Oxenford (Aus) and Chris Cassin (Aus)
Player of the match: Ian Bell (Eng)

- England won the toss and elected to bat.
- Ian Bell's 187 set a new record for runs scored by an England player in a one-day game.

== Points table ==
Pos	Team	Pld	W	L	T	NR	BP	Pts	NRR
1	Australia	4	3	0	0	1	1	15	0.467
2	England	4	2	2	0	0	1	9	0.425
3	India	4	0	3	0	1	0	2	−0.942

Source: ESPNcricinfo

== Fixtures ==
=== 1st match ===
16 January 2015
14:20 (D/N)
Scorecard

England; 234 (47.5 overs)	v	Australia; 7/235 (39.5 overs)
Eoin Morgan 121 (136); Mitchell Starc 4/42 (8.5 overs)		David Warner 127 (116); Chris Woakes 4/40 (8 overs)

Australia won by 3 wickets
Sydney Cricket Ground, Sydney
Umpires: Kumar Dharmasena (SL) and Simon Fry (Aus)
Player of the match: Mitchell Starc (Aus)

- England won the toss and elected to bat.
- Australia earned a bonus point for exceeding England's run rate by more than 1.25 times.

=== 2nd match ===
18 January 2015
14:20 (D/N)
Scorecard

India; 8/267 (50 overs)	v	Australia; 6/269 (49 overs)
Rohit Sharma 138 (139); Mitchell Starc 6/43 (10 overs)		Aaron Finch 96 (127); Umesh Yadav 2/55 (10 overs)

Australia won by 4 wickets
Melbourne Cricket Ground, Melbourne
Umpires: Kumar Dharmasena (SL) and John Ward (Aus)
Player of the match: Mitchell Starc (Aus)

- India won the toss and elected to bat.
- Gurinder Sandhu (Aus) made his ODI debut.
- David Warner (Aus) was fined 50% of his match fee on a charge of conduct contrary to the spirit of the game and George Bailey (Aus) was fined 20% of his match fee and suspended for a match for a slow over rate.

=== 3rd match ===
20 January 2015
13:20 (D/N)
Scorecard

India; 153 (39.3 overs)	v	England; 1/156 (27.3 overs)
Stuart Binny 44 (55); Steven Finn 5/33 (8 overs)		Ian Bell 88* (91); Stuart Binny 1/34 (7 overs)

England won by 9 wickets
The Gabba, Brisbane
Umpires: Kumar Dharmasena (SL) and Mick Martell (Aus)
Player of the match: Steven Finn (Eng)

- India won the toss and elected to bat.
- England earned a bonus point for exceeding India's run rate by more than 1.25 times.

=== 4th match ===
23 January 2015
14:20 (D/N)
Scorecard

England; 8/303 (50 overs)	v	Australia; 7/304 (49.5 overs)
Ian Bell 141 (125); Gurinder Sandhu 2/49 (10 overs)		Steve Smith 102* (95); Moeen Ali 2/50 (10 overs)

Australia won by 3 wickets
Bellerive Oval, Hobart
Umpires: Marais Erasmus (SA) and Simon Fry (Aus)
Player of the match: Steve Smith (Aus)

- Australia won the toss and elected to field.
- Ian Bell became England's leading run scorer in ODI cricket.
- Australia qualified for the final as a result of this match.

=== 5th match ===
26 January 2015
14:20 (D/N)
Scorecard

India; 2/69 (16 overs)	v	Australia
Ajinkya Rahane 28* (50); Mitchell Starc 1/11 (4 overs)

No result
Sydney Cricket Ground, Sydney
Umpires: Marais Erasmus (SA) and Paul Wilson (Aus)

- Australia won the toss and elected to field.
- Rain delayed the start of the match. Play started with a reduced number of overs to be played, before the game being called off after 16 overs of the Indian innings.

=== 6th match ===
30 January 2015
11:20
Scorecard

India; 200 (48.1 overs)	v	England; 7/201 (46.5 overs)
Ajinkya Rahane 73 (101); Steven Finn 3/36 (10 overs)		James Taylor 82 (122); Stuart Binny 3/33 (8 overs)

England won by 3 wickets
WACA Ground, Perth
Umpires: Marais Erasmus (SA) and John Ward (Aus)
Player of the match: James Taylor (Eng)

- England won the toss and elected to field.
- England qualified for the final as a result of this match.

== Final ==
1 February 2015
11:20
Scorecard

Australia; 8/278 (50 overs)	v	England; 166 (39.1 overs)
Glenn Maxwell 95 (98); Stuart Broad 3/55 (10 overs)		Ravi Bopara 33 (59); Glenn Maxwell 4/46 (9 overs)

Australia won by 112 runs
WACA Ground, Perth
Umpires: Marais Erasmus (SA) and Simon Fry (Aus)
Player of the match: Glenn Maxwell (Aus)

- England won the toss and elected to field.
