= Australian cricket team against Pakistan in the UAE in 2012 =

Pakistani cricket team vs Australia in UAE in 2012
	Pakistan	Australia
- Dates: 28 August – 10 September

One Day International series
- Results: Australia won the 3-match series 2–1
Most runs	Nasir Jamshed (168)	Michael Clarke (135)
Most wickets	Saeed Ajmal (10)	Mitchell Starc (9)
- Player of the series: Mitchell Starc (Aus)

Twenty20 International series
- Results: Pakistan won the 3-match series 2–1
Most runs	Kamran Akmal (74)	David Warner (112)
Most wickets	Saeed Ajmal (6)	Pat Cummins (5)
- Player of the series: Saeed Ajmal (Pak)

The Pakistani cricket team played a home series against Australia from 28 August to 10 September 2012 in the United Arab Emirates (UAE). The series consisted of three One Day International (ODI) and three Twenty20 International (T20I) matches. The matches began in the late evening to avoid the high temperature of the daytime. The ODI series was reduced due to Australian Cricketers' Association (ACA) and Cricket Australia (CA) concerns about the weather in the UAE during August.

Earlier the International Cricket Council (ICC) approved a six-match T20I series on the request of Pakistan Cricket Board (PCB), but Pakistan still wanted to play an ODI series. The PCB chairman, Zaka Ashraf proposed the matches start in the evening to avoid the worst of the heat. The series was initially scheduled to take place in Sri Lanka but clashed with the dates of the Sri Lanka Premier League (SLPL) and was shifted to the UAE.

== Squads ==
ODIs		T20Is	
Pakistan	Australia	Pakistan	Australia
Misbah-ul-Haq (c); Mohammad Hafeez (vc); Shoaib Malik; Asad Shafiq; Azhar Ali; Imran Farhat; Abdur Rehman; Anwar Ali; Saeed Ajmal; Kamran Akmal (wk); Shahid Afridi; Sohail Tanvir; Umar Akmal; Junaid Khan; Nasir Jamshed; Aizaz Cheema	Michael Clarke (c); George Bailey (vc); Daniel Christian; Xavier Doherty; Callum Ferguson; David Hussey; Michael Hussey; Mitchell Johnson; Clint McKay; Glenn Maxwell; James Pattinson; Steven Smith; Mitchell Starc; Matthew Wade (wk); David Warner; Alister McDermott	Mohammad Hafeez (c); Shahid Afridi (vc); Asad Shafiq; Imran Nazir; Kamran Akmal (wk); Mohammad Sami; Nasir Jamshed; Raza Hasan; Saeed Ajmal; Abdul Razzaq; Shoaib Malik; Sohail Tanvir; Umar Akmal; Umar Gul; Yasir Arafat	George Bailey (c); David Hussey(vc); Pat Cummins; Xavier Doherty; Ben Hilfenhaus; Brad Hogg; Daniel Christian; Michael Hussey; Clint McKay; Glenn Maxwell; Mitchell Starc; Matthew Wade (wk); David Warner; Shane Watson; Cameron White

== ODI series ==
=== 1st ODI ===
28 August
18:00 (D/N)
Scorecard

Pakistan; 198 (45.1 overs)	v	Australia; 199/6 (48.2 overs)
Asad Shafiq 56 (77); Mitchell Starc 5/42 (10 overs)		Michael Clarke 66 (96); Saeed Ajmal 3/30 (10 overs)

Australia won by 4 wickets
Sharjah Cricket Association Stadium, UAE
Umpires: Billy Bowden (NZ) and Zameer Haider (Pak)
Player of the match: Mitchell Starc (Aus)

- Pakistan won the toss and elected to bat.

=== 2nd ODI ===
August 31
18:00 (D/N)
Scorecard

Australia; 248/9 (50 overs)	v	Pakistan; 249/3 (43.4 overs)
Michael Hussey 61 (72); Saeed Ajmal 4/32 (10 overs)		Nasir Jamshed 97 (98); Daniel Christian 1/40 (8 overs)

Pakistan won by 7 wickets
Sheikh Zayed Cricket Stadium, Abu Dhabi UAE
Umpires: Shozab Raza (Pak) and Zameer Haider (Pak)
Player of the match: Saeed Ajmal (Pak)

- Australia won the toss and elected to bat.

=== 3rd ODI ===
3 September
18:00 (D/N)
Scorecard

Pakistan; 244/7 (50 overs)	v	Australia; 250/7 (47 overs)
Mohammad Hafeez 78 (97); Mitchell Starc 4/51 (10 overs)		Michael Hussey 65 (72); Saeed Ajmal 3/37 (9 overs)

Australia won by 3 wickets
Sharjah Cricket Association Stadium, UAE
Umpires: Ahsan Raza (Pak) and Nigel Llong (Eng)
Player of the match: MEK Hussey (Aus)

- Australia won the toss and elected to field.

== T20I series ==
=== 1st T20I ===
5 September
20:00 (D/N)
Scorecard

Australia; 89 (19.3 overs)	v	Pakistan; 90/3 (14.5 overs)
David Warner 22 (25); Sohail Tanvir 3/13 (2.3 overs)		Kamran Akmal 31* (24); Shane Watson 1/9 (2.5 overs)

Pakistan won by 7 wickets
DSC Cricket Stadium, Dubai, UAE
Umpires: Ahsan Raza (Pak) and Shozab Raza (Pak)
Player of the match: Mohammad Hafeez (Pak)

- Pakistan won the toss and elected to field.
- Glenn Maxwell (Aus), Nasir Jamshed (Pak), and Raza Hasan (Pak) made their T20I debuts.

=== 2nd T20I ===
7 September
20:00 (D/N)
Scorecard

Pakistan; 151/4 (20 overs)	v	Australia; 151/8 (20 overs)
Nasir Jamshed 45 (36); Mitchell Starc 1/17 (4 overs)		George Bailey 42 (27); Abdul Razzaq 2/9 (1 overs)

Match tied; Pakistan won the Super Over
DSC Cricket Stadium, Dubai, UAE
Umpires: Shozab Raza (Pak) and Zameer Haider (Pak)
Player of the match: Saeed Ajmal (Pak)

- Pakistan won the toss and elected to bat.
- Mitchell Starc (Aus) made his T20I debut.

=== 3rd T20I ===
10 September
20:00 (D/N)
Scorecard

Australia; 168/7 (20 overs)	v	Pakistan; 74 (19.1 overs)
David Warner 59 (34); Saeed Ajmal 2/19 (4 overs)		Nasir Jamshed 17 (23); Mitchell Starc 3/11 (3.1 overs)

Australia won by 94 runs
DSC Cricket Stadium, Dubai, UAE
Umpires: Ahsan Raza (Pak) and Zameer Haider (Pak)
Player of the match: David Warner (Aus)

- Pakistan won the toss and elected to field

== Broadcasting Rights ==
TV Broadcaster(s)	Country	Notes
TEN Sports	Pakistan; Sri Lanka	Official Broadcasters of the tournament.
TEN Cricket	Bangladesh; India	
PTV Sports	Pakistan	
Sky Sports	United Kingdom	
SuperSport	South Africa	
