= Glenn Maxwell =

Australian cricketer (born 1988)

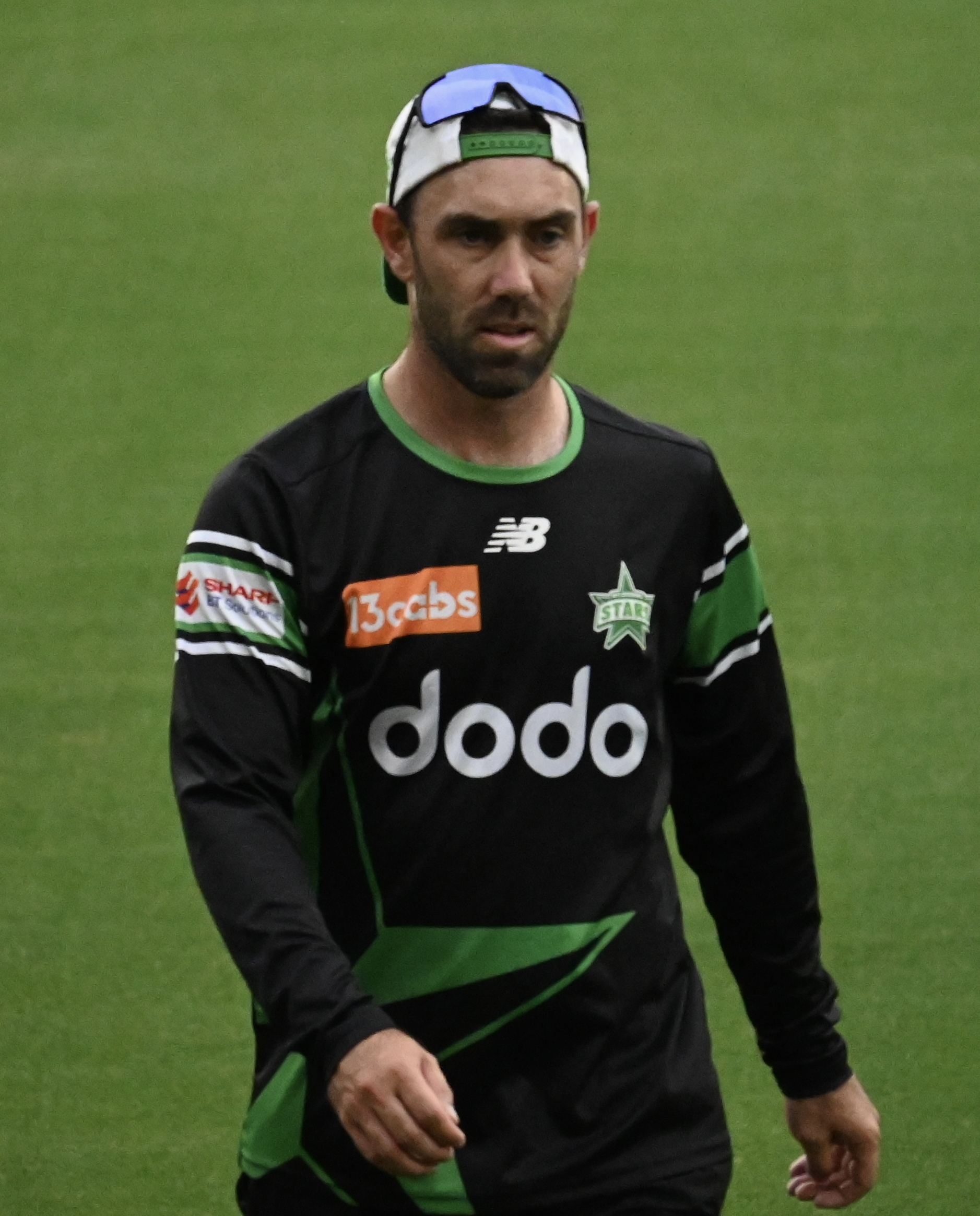
- Maxwell in 2026

Personal information
- Full name: Glenn James Maxwell
- Born: 14 October 1988 (age 38); Kew, Victoria, Australia
- Nickname: The Big Show, Maxi
- Height: 182 cm (6 ft 0 in)
- Batting: Right-handed
- Bowling: Right-arm off break
- Role: Batting all-rounder

International information
- National side: Australia (2012–2026)
- Test debut (cap 433): 2 March 2013 v India
- Last Test: 4 September 2017 v Bangladesh
- ODI debut (cap 196): 25 August 2012 v Afghanistan
- Last ODI: 4 March 2025 v India
- ODI shirt no.: 32
- T20I debut (cap 58): 5 September 2012 v Pakistan
- Last T20I: 20 February 2026 v Oman
- T20I shirt no.: 32

Domestic team information
- Years: Team
- 2010/11–2025/26: Victoria
- 2011/12: Melbourne Renegades
- 2012, 2018: Delhi Daredevils
- 2012, 2014: Hampshire
- 2012/13–present: Melbourne Stars
- 2013: Mumbai Indians
- 2013: Surrey
- 2014–2017, 2020, 2025: Punjab Kings
- 2015: Yorkshire
- 2019: Lancashire
- 2021–2024: Royal Challengers Bengaluru
- 2022: London Spirit
- 2023: Warwickshire
- 2024–present: Washington Freedom
- 2026: Hyderabad Kingsmen
- 2026: Belfast Wolves

Career statistics
Competition	Test	ODI	T20I	FC
Matches	7	149	130	69
Runs scored	339	3,990	2,897	4,147
Batting average	26.07	33.81	28.97	39.49
100s/50s	1/0	4/23	5/12	7/24
Top score	104	201*	145*	278
Balls bowled	462	4,002	1,117	5,824
Wickets	8	77	51	78
Bowling average	42.62	47.32	29.70	41.48
5 wickets in innings	0	0	0	1
10 wickets in match	0	0	0	0
Best bowling	4/127	4/40	3/10	5/40
Catches/stumpings	5/–	91/–	62/–	58/–
Medal record
Men's cricket
Representing Australia
ICC Cricket World Cup
Winner	2015 Australia and New Zealand
Winner	2023 India
ICC T20 World Cup
Winner	2021 UAE and Oman
- Source: ESPNcricinfo, 25 February 2025

Glenn Maxwell (born 14 October 1988) is an Australian cricketer who represented the Australia national cricket team in all formats. He plays for Victoria in domestic cricket and the Melbourne Stars in the Big Bash League (BBL).

A right handed all-rounder who is known for his sometimes unorthodox batting, Maxwell originally bowled medium-pace before switching to off-spin at a young age. He rose to prominence in 2011 after setting an at-the-time record for the fastest half-century in Australian domestic one day cricket—scoring 51 runs from 19 balls. The record led to his international debut, playing an ODI against Afghanistan in 2012, before making his T20I debut a month later against Pakistan and his Test debut against India the year after. As of 2026, he has played 7 Test matches, 149 ODIs and 130 T20I matches, the latter being the most of any Australian player.

Maxwell has held numerous international batting records over his career. After scoring 104 against India in 2017, Maxwell became the second Australian to have scored centuries in all three international cricket formats. Alongside Rohit Sharma, he holds the record for the most career T20I centuries—both having scored 5. At the 2023 Cricket World Cup, he achieved a century in 40 balls against the Netherlands, the fastest century scored at a Cricket World Cup and fourth fastest in ODIs. Against Afghanistan a month later, he set a new record for the fastest double century scored at the same event, the second fastest in ODI cricket—the innings regarded as one of the greatest in ODI history.

Known for his dramatic shot making and improvisation in short forms of the game, Maxwell was part of the Australian squads that won the 2015 Cricket World Cup, the 2021 T20 World Cup, and the 2023 Cricket World Cup. His ability to make unconventional shots, like reverse sweeps and pulls, often makes it hard to set fields that cover all of his scoring areas.

== Early and personal life ==
Maxwell was born in Kew, Victoria, and played junior cricket for South Belgrave Cricket Club. He initially played as a medium-pace bowler, before moving to bowl off spin.

Maxwell married his long-time girlfriend Vini Raman in March 2022. The couple have a son born in September 2023.

Maxwell is a supporter of the St Kilda Football Club in the Australian Football League.

== Domestic career ==
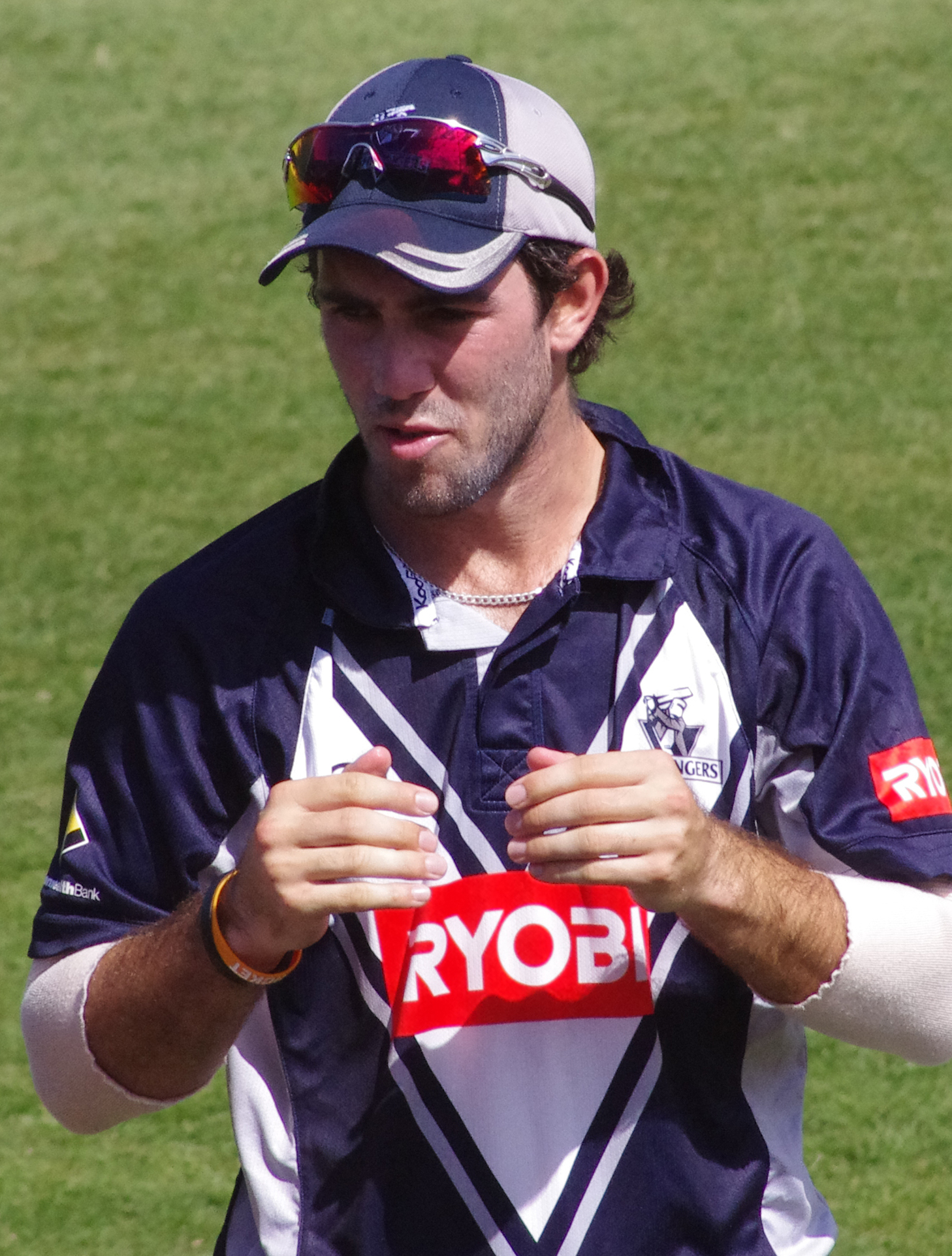
Maxwell in 2011

Maxwell joined the Victorian squad in 2009–10 following an injury to Andrew McDonald in November. He made his senior debut for the one-day team in February 2010 and was selected to play for the Australian Institute of Sports in the 2010 Emerging Players Tournament. He scored 69 against India in the final.

Maxwell attracted national attention in February 2011 after scoring a match winning 51 from 19 balls in a Ryobi Cup game against Tasmania, the fastest half-century in Australian domestic one-day history, and made his first-class debut for Victoria against New South Wales later in the month, taking two wickets and scoring 38 runs on debut. The following month he scored his debut first-class century, making 103 runs against South Australia. In the 2011 Emerging Players Tournament, Maxwell scored 59 from 23 balls against India and 110 from 52 balls against South Africa.

In 2012, Maxwell went to England to play club cricket for South Wilts Cricket Club and Second XI cricket for Hampshire before appearing in the T20 Blast for the county.

Maxwell attempted to transfer to New South Wales ahead of the 2016–17 summer but was refused permission and was dropped from the Victorian team for the first match of the Sheffield Shield season. Maxwell was picked in the next Shield game and scored 81.

In November 2017, he scored his maiden double-century, scoring 278 against the New South Wales cricket team.

Maxwell opted out of a Victorian state contract for the 2026-27 season, but remained available for selection in One-Day cricket.

=== T20 franchise cricket ===
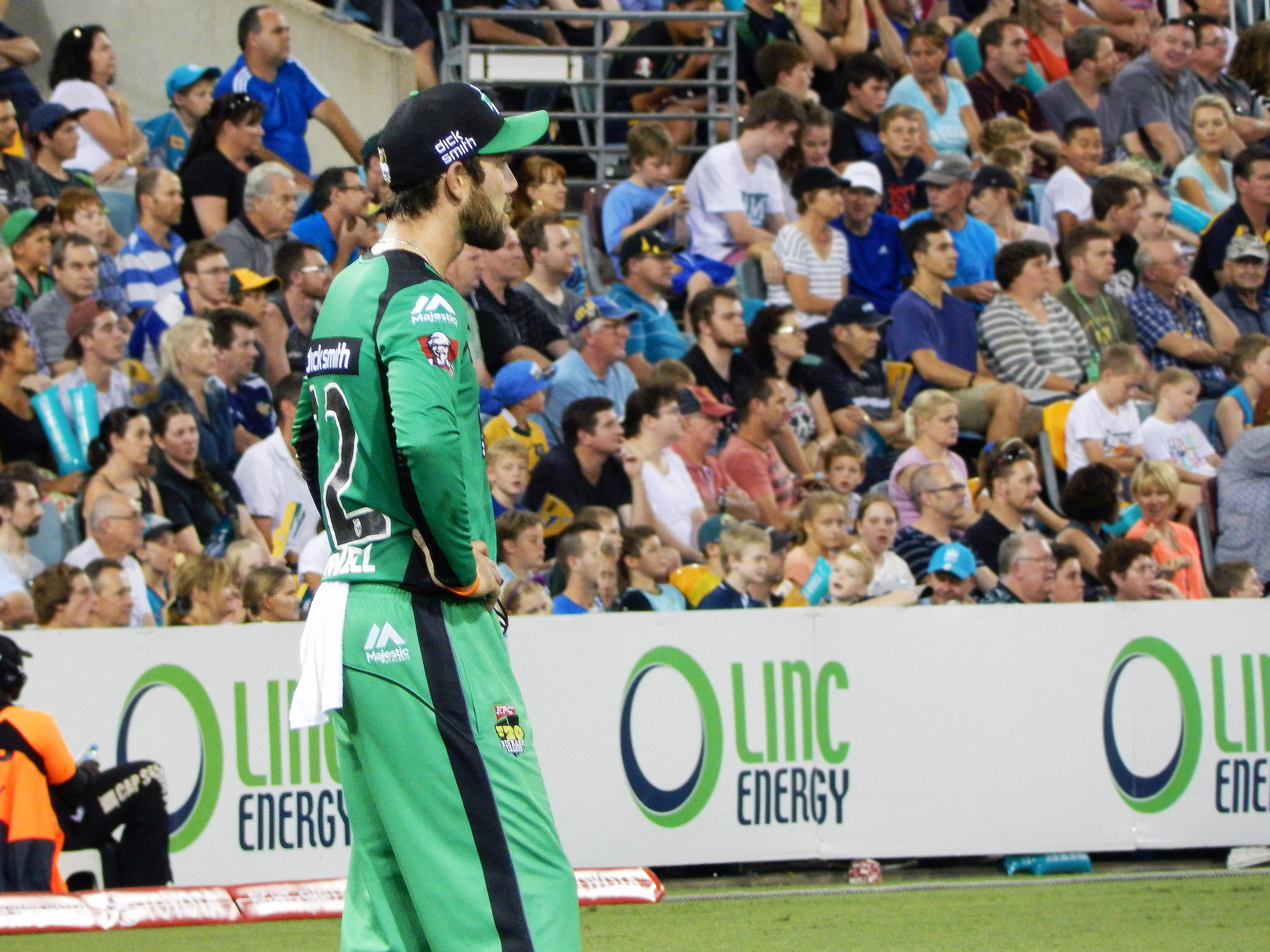
Glenn Maxwell during a BBL match while playing for Melbourne Stars

Maxwell has played in Twenty20 cricket franchises leagues in Australia, India and England. In the domestic Big Bash League he played for Melbourne Renegades in 2012–13 and has since played for Melbourne Stars. During the 2021–22 season he scored 154 not out against Hobart Hurricanes, breaking the record for the highest individual score in the league and leading his team to the highest team total in league history.

In India he played for Delhi Daredevils in 2012 before being bought in the 2013 IPL auction by Mumbai Indians, becoming the most expensive purchase at the auction, commanding a price of US$1 million. In 2014 he was bought by Kings XI Punjab, making scores of 95, 89, 95 and 90 runs during the season. In 16 games he had the season's third highest aggregate of runs scored with 552 runs at an average of 34.50 runs per innings and was retained by the team for the following two seasons. He returned to play for Delhi ahead of the 2018 season He again had a poor season, scoring 142 runs at an average of 14 and not passing 50 once. before being the subject of a bidding war between Delhi and Punjab ahead of the 2020 season, eventually being bought by Punjab. In 2021, he was bought by Royal Challengers Bangalore after another bidding war, this time with the Chennai Super Kings, and finished the season as the team's highest scorer, with 513 runs. He was retained by the team for the 2022 season. Maxwell was bought by Punjab Kings in 2025 but had a poor season as the team finished runners-up that season

In England, Maxwell has played for Hampshire, Surrey, Yorkshire, Lancashire and Warwickshire County Cricket Clubs in the T20 Blast and for London Spirit in the 2022 season of The Hundred.

== International career ==
Maxwell was selected for Australia's series against Pakistan in the UAE in 2012, with head selector John Inverarity saying that he was "a versatile and lively off-spinning allrounder and brilliant fieldsman" who "will provide another spin bowler option on the slow, low, turning wickets" expected in the country. He made his debut against Afghanistan in the one-off One Day International (ODI) which took place ahead of the matches against Pakistan, before going on to play in five of Australia's six fixtures against the Pakistanis. Scores of 38, 28 and 56 not out in the three ODIs on the tour, saw him selected for two of the three Twenty20 International (T20I) matches, scoring four on T20I debut and 27 from 20 balls in the final match of the tour; he also took his first international wicket.

The same squad of players was selected for the 2012 ICC World Twenty20 in Sri Lanka which followed Australia's matches in the UAE. He played in all five of Australia's group stage matches, taking a single wicket and scoring only eight runs in the two innings in which he batted, but was dropped from the team for the semi-final against West Indies. Following the competition, Maxwell played for Australia A and for the Cricket Australia Chairman's XI against Sri Lanka, Maxwell scored 64 and took 2/70. before being called into the Australian squad for the third Test against the touring Sri Lankans at the end of the year, replacing Shane Watson. He did not play in the Test, but was brought back into the team for three of the five ODIs and both of the T20Is played in January. He was involved in a controversy in the final T20I of the series, after becoming involved in a verbal altercation with opposition players after failing to hit the last ball for four.

=== Test match debut ===
After scoring 51 not out from 35 balls opening the batting against West Indies in the first ODI of 2013, Maxwell took four wickets in the second match of the series. He was subsequently selected for Australia's Test tour of India later in the month as an all-rounder. He made his Test debut against India in the second Test at Hyderabad as the team's second spinner, supporting Xavier Doherty with established lead spin bowler Nathan Lyon dropped. He scored 13 and 8 runs in the first and second innings respectively, but took 4/127 with the ball. He was dropped from the team for the third Test as Australia opted for more specialist bowlers, but brought back for the fourth and final Test in Delhi, replacing injured batsman Michael Clarke. He scored 10 and 8 runs.

Later in 2013, Maxwell played in the 2013 ICC Champions Trophy in England, but was not selected for the 2013 Ashes which followed the competition. He went to South Africa with Australia A, making a first-class century against South Africa A and a limited overs century against India A in a tri-series.

By now an established member of Australia's one-day teams, Maxwell returned to India in October as part of an Australian limited overs tour of India and played against England later in the year. He was named in Australia's 15-man squad for 2014 ICC World Twenty20 in Bangladesh, scoring 74 runs from 33 balls against Pakistan in Australia's first match of the competition. He finished the tournament as Australia's second highest run scorer, making 147 runs.

Maxwell made a return to the Test team in October 2014 against Pakistan in the UAE, playing in the second match of the two-match series. He scored 37 in the first innings and four in the second and was wicket-less; he performed better during the one-day matches.

=== 2015 Cricket World Cup ===
Maxwell was selected in Australia's 15-man squad for the ODI World Cup co-hosted by Australia and New Zealand in early 2015. He scored 95 runs and took four wickets against England in final of the warm-up triangular series in early February and began the tournament well, making scores of 66 from 40 balls in the first match against England, and 88 from 39 balls against Afghanistan. Later in the tournament, he scored his maiden international century, scoring 102 against Sri Lanka at the Sydney Cricket Ground. He brought up his century in 51 balls, at the time recording the fastest century by an Australian man in an ODI and the second-fastest in World Cup history.

In the quarter-final against Pakistan, Maxwell took two wickets and scored 44 runs, before scoring 23 against India in the semi-final. He did not bat in the final against New Zealand but took a wicket as Australia won their fifth World Cup title. Maxwell ended the tournament as Australia's third highest run scorer, scoring 324 runs at a batting average of 64.80 runs per innings.

Maxwell continued to be a fixture in Australia's one-day teams following the World Cup. He was named as Cricket Australia's men's T20I Player of 2015 at the Allan Border Medal ceremony and played regularly throughout 2015 and the first half of 2016. He was not included in either the Test and ODI teams for Australia's tour of Sri Lanka in 2016, but was in the team for the T20I series. In early September he scored an unbeaten 145 from 65 deliveries opening the batting at Kandy, at the time the second-highest individual score in men's Twenty20 Internationals. Maxwell returned to the ODI team at the beginning of 2017 for the series against Pakistan, making scores of 60 in first ODI and 78 in the fourth match. He was named as Cricket Australia's men's ODI Player of 2016.

=== Test return ===
In February 2017, Maxwell was selected for Australia's squad for the Test tour of India. He played in the opening tour game against India A but did not make the team for the first two Tests, with Mitchell Marsh preferred as the team's all-rounder. An injury to Marsh saw Maxwell return to the team in the third Test of the series, scoring his maiden Test century. His score of 104 runs meant that he became the second Australian man to score a century in all three international formats. He scored 8 and 45 in the fourth Test. In 2018 he was indirectly accused by an Al Jazeera documentary of being a suspect in a set of spot-fixing allegations surrounding the third Test. He denied all of the allegations levelled against him.

After playing in Australia's team in the 2017 ICC Champions Trophy in England and Wales in June, Maxwell was selected again in the Test squad for Australia's tour of Bangladesh in August and September. He played in both Tests during the series, preferred as a spin bowling option in south-Asian conditions. After struggling on Australia's ODI tour of India later in September, he was dropped from the team during the tour and lost his place in the Test team for the 2017–18 Ashes series. He was called into the squad as cover after before the first Test following injuries to Shaun Marsh and David Warner the day before the game but did not play. Despite scoring 278 for Victoria against New South Wales and 98 against Western Australia, Maxwell did not play in the series, and Mitchell Marsh scored two centuries, cementing his role as the team's all-rounder. He was not selected for the one-day team against England, with Chris Lynn replacing him. When Lynn was injured the selectors called Cameron White into the team rather than Maxwell, with Australian coach Darren Lehmann confirming that Maxwell had not been selected due to his lack of runs rather than concerns around his attitude to international cricket.

Australia's captain Steve Smith suggested at a press conference that Maxwell could "train smarter", commenting that although he was an explosive one-day player than he should aim for more consistency in his game, a view echoed by head selector Trevor Hohns. He was called into the squad for the final two matches following an injury to Aaron Finch, playing in the final match of the series scoring 34 runs.

=== ODI return ===
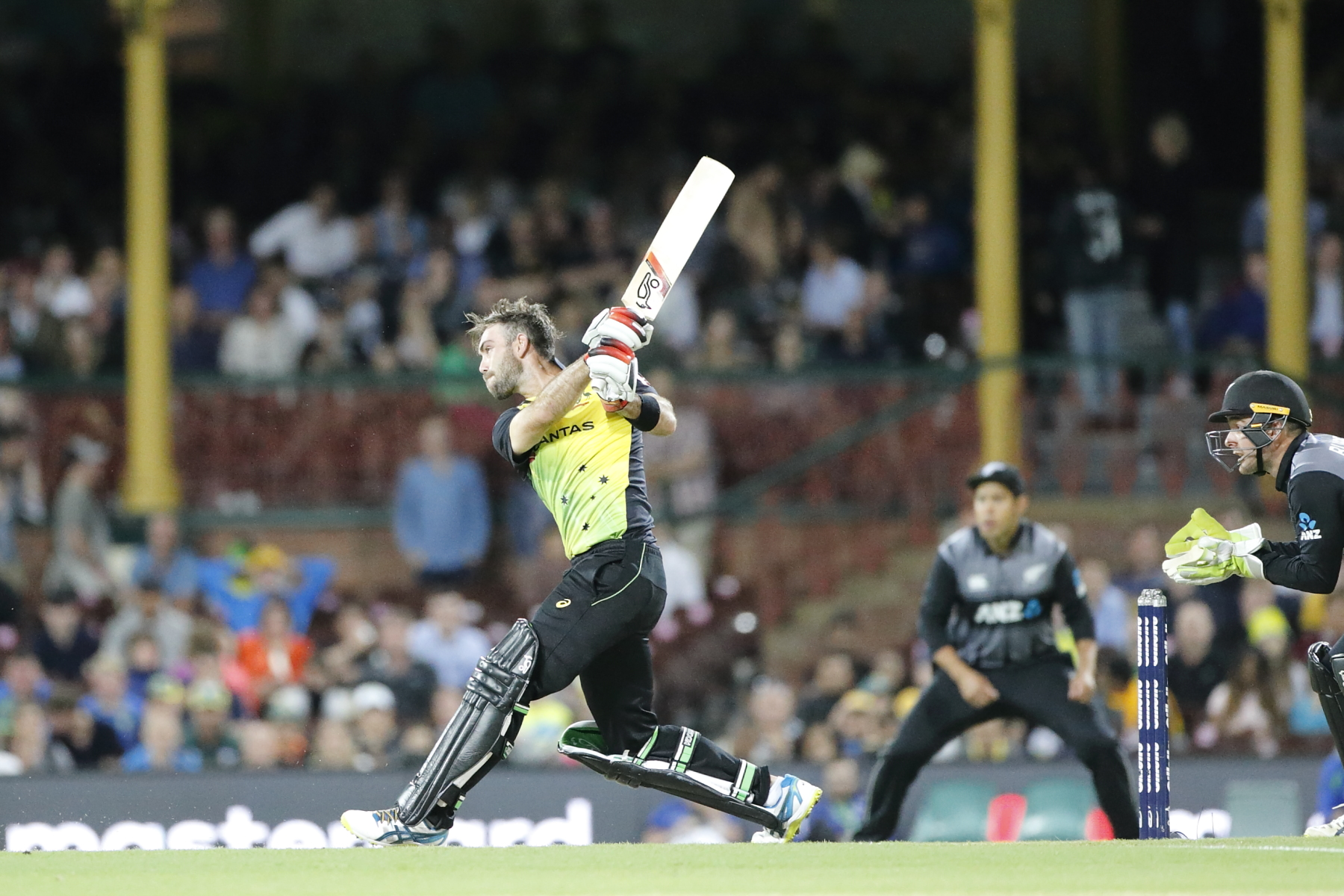
Maxwell batting against New Zealand in February 2018 during the Tri-Series.

Maxwell returned to Australia's squad for the 2017–18 Trans-Tasman Tri-Series involving New Zealand and England in early 2018. In the first T20I of the series, he scored 40 from 24 balls against New Zealand, before making a century against England in the second match, making 103 runs from 58 balls. He also took three wickets in the match.

In March, Maxwell was briefly recalled to the Australian Test squad following the suspensions of Smith, Warner and Cameron Bancroft for ball tampering during the Australian 2018 Tour of South Africa, but did not play in the final Test of the series. The following month he was awarded a national contract for the 2018–19 season and played during the ODI tour of England, scoring 112 runs at an average of 37.33, and in the team's tours throughout 2018 and into 2019.

Despite being omitted from the Test squad to play Pakistan in October 2018, Maxwell had re-established himself in the one-day team. He scored his third T20I century during the tour of India in early 2019, making 113 not out and becoming the first Australian man to score three T20I centuries. He was again named as Cricket Australia's men's T20I player of the year for 2019.

He played in Australia's squad in the 2019 Cricket World Cup before announcing in October that he would be taking a short break from cricket due to mental health issues.

He returned later in the domestic season and toured England in 2020 during the COVID-19 pandemic. In their ODI series against England (played across three matches), Maxwell impressed, scoring 186 runs at an average of 62, including a score of 108 in the final ODI, his second ODI century. He was named player of the series and also became the become the fastest player to score 3,000 ODI runs. His form continued into the Australian summer when India toured Australia, but he was not selected for the Test team. He did, however, play in Australia's squad in the 2021 ICC Men's T20 World Cup,

=== 2023 Cricket World Cup ===
He was named in the Australian fifteen man squad for the 2023 Cricket World Cup. During the competition, Maxwell scored scored 106 runs from 44 balls to achieve the fastest century in Cricket World Cup history and fourth fastest century in ODIs against Netherlands in October.

==== Performance against Afghanistan ====
Maxwell set a plethora of records during his knock of 201* against Afghanistan in a group stage match of the 2023 Cricket World Cup on 7 November at the Wankede Stadium in Mumbai. He was hailed by fans and critics who insisted that he played out of his skin to help Australia register an unlikely victory after being put on the back foot by Afghanistan early on in the Australian batting innings. His ODI innings was also hailed by many as the "greatest ever innings in the history of ODI cricket".

Maxwell suffered cramps and injury concerns over the course of his knock. He was unable to run during the latter half of his innings and hence developed a strategy with captain Pat Cummins, with whom he was out in the middle, to hit one or two boundaries at the beginning of each over before walking a comfortable one and allowing Cummins to soak up the remaining deliveries the over. Cummins would go on to call it “the greatest ODI innings to have ever happened”. His double century propelled Australia to a semi-final spot with one game still remaining for Australia in the World Cup. Throughout his knock, Maxwell was given several lifelines, first when he faced a hat-trick ball from Azmatullah Omarzai as his first delivery. The delivery seamed in towards off-stump, but a small edge ensured that he was not out LBW or bowled, nor did it carry through to the keeper. He was later also dropped on 33 by Mujeeb Ur Rahman at short fine leg.

His monumental knock of 201* which consisted of 21 fours and 10 sixes is also the highest individual score by an Australian in an ODI match surpassing the previous best by Shane Watson who made 185* against Bangladesh in 2011. He also became the second fastest ever to score a double century in ODI cricket behind Ishan Kishan, as he completed the double hundred with a winning six to seal the deal for Australia facing 128 deliveries. He also scored the fastest ever World Cup double century. He became the first batsman to score a double century in an ODI run chase and broke Shane Watson's record for the highest individual score in a successful run chase in ODI cricket. He also surpassed Fakhar Zaman's record for the highest ever individual score by a batsman in the second innings of an ODI match. He also became only the third double centurion in the history of World Cups after Chris Gayle and Martin Guptill. Maxwell was also the first batsman to score a World Cup double century while batting second and also registered the highest individual score by an Australian in a World Cup match. He also became the first ever batsman to score a double century in ODI history while batting at number 6 or lower down the order which also eventually broke Kapil Dev's record of 175* for the highest individual score in ODI history while batting at no. 6 position or lower. His innings of 201* came in a run chase which was lesser than target of 300 and it was the first such instance where a batsman made a score of 200 or more in an ODI innings where the target was set less than 300 to chase. He also became the first ever middle order batsman as well as non-opener to score a double century in Cricket World Cup history.

Alongside the team captain, Pat Cummins, he shattered the previous record held by Zimbabwean pair, Dave Houghton and Iain Butchart, for one of the highest ever eighth wicket partnership in the history of Cricket World Cups in the match against Afghanistan. Maxwell and Cummins shared an unbeaten stand of 202, out of which Maxwell was the chief contributor with 179 runs (201* total); Cummins contributed 12 runs. Maxwell and Cummins batted together at a time when the team was reeling at a precarious position when they lost 7 wickets for just 91 runs, with 201 still needed to chase the target of 292 runs. Maxwell's achievements and records in the match drew praise from cricket legends, including Sachin Tendulkar, who described Maxwell's innings as "the best ODI knock I've seen in my life."

Cummins, who scored 12 whilst Maxwell scored 201, joked "A lot of credit should go to Maxi, he played his role beautifully." Maxwell eventually ended the World Cup tournament on a high note, by scoring 400 runs in the whole tournament at an average of 66 striking at 150 while also picking up 6 wickets at a decent economy rate of 4.81 and played a pivotal role in Australia's sixth World Cup title.

=== 2024–2026 ===
After helping Australia win their record-breaking sixth World Cup, he continued his T20I success into 2024 by scoring his fourth and fifth centuries in his 100th and 102nd T20I appearance. In the third match of the Australia vs India series in November 2023, he scored an unbeaten 104 runs off 48 deliveries to lead Australia to a victory total of 223. He hit eight fours and eight sixes, including 18 runs off the last over to secure the win.

He became the second player in men's T20I cricket, after Rohit Sharma, to score four centuries and set the record for the most T20I centuries by an Australian. He achieved this in his ninety-second batting innings, making him the fastest player to reach four T20I centuries. He also tied the record for the fastest century by an Australian batsman in a T20I, reaching it in 47 balls. Additionally, he holds the record for the most centuries scored while chasing in T20I history, with three out of four centuries in pressure situations.

On 11 February 2024, batting against the West Indies in his ninety-fourth innings, he scored his fifth T20I century with a 120 not out from 55 balls, again equalling Rohit Sharma for the record of most T20I centuries in a career. Alongside scoring the most T20I centuries, Maxwell also scored the fastest T20I century on Australian soil.

In May 2024, he was named in Australia's squad for the 2024 T20 World Cup tournament.

On 2 June 2025, Maxwell announced his retirement from One Day International cricket, after 149 matches over 13 years, including two World Cup titles. He scored 3,990 runs and picked 77 wickets from his 149 ODI games.

On 3 November 2026, Maxwell announced his retirement from international cricket.

== International centuries ==
List of international centuries scored by Glenn Maxwell
No.	Score	Opponent	Format	Venue	Date	Result	Refs
1	102	Sri Lanka	ODI	Sydney Cricket Ground, Sydney	8 March 2015	Won	
2	145*	Sri Lanka	T20I	Pallekele International Cricket Stadium, Kandy	6 September 2016	Won	
3	104	India	Test	JSCA International Stadium Complex, Ranchi	16–20 March 2017	Drawn	
4	103*	England	T20I	Bellerive Oval, Hobart	7 February 2018	Won	
5	113*	India	T20I	M. Chinnaswamy Stadium, Bengaluru	27 February 2019	Won	
6	108	England	ODI	Old Trafford Cricket Ground, Manchester	16 September 2020	Won	
7	106	Netherlands	ODI	Arun Jaitley Cricket Stadium, New Delhi	25 October 2023	Won	
8	201*	Afghanistan	ODI	Wankhede Stadium, Mumbai	7 November 2023	Won	
9	104*	India	T20I	Assam Cricket Association Stadium, Guwahati	28 November 2023	Won	
10	120*	West Indies	T20I	Adelaide Oval, Adelaide	11 February 2024	Won	

== Honours ==
=== Team ===
==== International ====
- T20 World Cup: 2021
- Cricket World Cup: 2015, 2023

==== Domestic/Franchise ====
- Sheffield Shield: 2014–15, 2015–16, 2016–17, 2018–19
- Indian Premier League: 2013
- County Championship: 2015
- Major League Cricket: 2024

=== Individual ===
- Cricket Australia Men's One Day International Player of the Year: 2016
- Cricket Australia Men's Twenty20 International Player of the Year: 2016, 2019
- Big Bash League Player of the Series: 2024–25
