= Australian cricket team in Bangladesh in 2017 =

International cricket tour

	Bangladesh	Australia
- Dates: 22 August – 8 September 2017
Captains	Mushfiqur Rahim	Steve Smith

Test series
- Result: 2-match series drawn 1–1
Most runs	Tamim Iqbal (270)	David Warner (351)
Most wickets	Shakib Al Hasan (12)	Nathan Lyon (22)
- Player of the series: David Warner and Nathan Lyon (Aus)

The Australia cricket team toured Bangladesh in August and September 2017 to play two Test matches. It was Australia's first tour to Bangladesh since 2011. Bangladesh won the first Test by 20 runs, their first ever victory against Australia in a Test match. Following the win, Bangladesh's captain Mushfiqur Rahim said "It's a great feeling beating Australia, and I think it was a great effort by the boys". Australia's Steve Smith said "I think they're a dangerous side, particularly here at home". Australia won the second Test by 7 wickets, drawing the series 1-1.

== Background ==
The Australia cricket team were scheduled to tour Bangladesh from 28 September to 21 October 2015 to play a tour match and two Test matches.

A day before the tour was scheduled to start, the Australian team did not leave their country as Cricket Australia (CA) received information about security concerns. The Bangladesh Cricket Board (BCB) said that they were surprised by the delay. Sean Carroll, security manager for CA, met with the Australian High Commissioner in Bangladesh and the Bangladesh government to discuss the concerns. Despite the continuing concerns regarding the tour, Bangladesh announced their squad on 28 September. The BCB chief executive Nizamuddin Chowdhury said: "we are expecting all the matches to be played on schedule". On 30 September the Australian cricketers were sent back to their state squads in readiness for the Matador Cup. The BCB said that "the Bangladesh government has committed to additional security on top of the substantial and elaborate arrangements in the BCB's standard Security Plan for international cricket".

On 1 October, Cricket Australia confirmed that the tour had been postponed with a view to re-arrange the matches for a later date. In April 2016, it indicated that it was hoping the tour would go ahead in 2017. In June 2017, Cricket Australia confirmed the tour would take place in August 2017.

Following England's tour to Bangladesh in October 2016, James Sutherland, CEO of Cricket Australia (CA), said the chances of Australia playing in Bangladesh were "quite high". In April 2017, both CA and the Bangladesh Cricket Board (BCB) were negotiating the fixtures for the tour. The BCB's chief executive said they "are now working on the schedule and other details with CA". In May 2017, security assessments took place. Later the same month, Cricket Australia sent a security team to Bangladesh to finalise arrangements for the tour.

Representatives from both CA and the Australian Cricketers' Association (ACA) undertook a pre-tour security visit on 24 July 2017. However, there was an ongoing pay dispute between Australian cricketers, CA and the ACA, with the BCB being informed of the possibility of the tour not going ahead. Earlier in July, the Australia A cricket team had pulled out of a tri-series tournament in South Africa because of the dispute. Australia's Test squad said they would attend a training camp in Darwin ahead of the series, but would not fly to Bangladesh unless there was a resolution to the pay dispute. On 1 August 2017, Australia's captain Steve Smith said that the pay negotiations were progressing, but they needed to be finalised before the tour starts. The following day, a deal was reached in the pay dispute, allowing for the Test series to go ahead as planned. The Australian team arrived in Bangladesh on 18 August 2017, under heavy security.

Prior to the tour starting, the Khan Shaheb Osman Ali Stadium, the venue for the first tour match between the Australians and a BCB XI was waterlogged. The BCB looked at two alternative venues to play the fixture, in case the ground was not ready in time. However, one day before the scheduled start of the match, it was called off, because of the waterlogging.

== Squads ==
Bangladesh	Australia
Mushfiqur Rahim (c, wk); Shakib Al Hasan; Imrul Kayes; Mominul Haque; Tamim Iqbal; Litton Das; Sabbir Rahman; Soumya Sarker; Mehedi Hasan Miraz; Mosaddek Hossain Saikat; Nasir Hossain; Shafiul Islam; Taskin Ahmed; Taijul Islam; Mustafizur Rahman	Steve Smith (c); David Warner (vc); Matthew Renshaw; Glenn Maxwell; Hilton Cartwright; Peter Handscomb; Matthew Wade (wk); Usman Khawaja; Josh Hazlewood; Pat Cummins; Nathan Lyon; Ashton Agar; Jackson Bird; Steve O'Keefe; ~~James Pattinson~~; Mitchell Swepson

Before the series started, Mitchell Swepson was added to the squad and Jackson Bird replaced James Pattinson. Mominul Haque was added to Bangladesh's squad for the first Test, after Mosaddek Hossain suffered an eye infection. Steve O'Keefe was added to Australia's squad ahead of the second Test, as a replacement for Josh Hazlewood, who was injured.

== Tour match: BCB XI v Australia ==
22–23 August 2017
Scorecard

BCB XI (Bangladesh)	v	Australia

Match abandoned
Khan Shaheb Osman Ali Stadium, Fatullah

- The match was called off due to waterlogging.

== Test series ==
=== 1st Test ===
27–31 August 2017
Scorecard

Bangladesh	v	Australia
260 (78.5 overs); Shakib Al Hasan 84 (133); Ashton Agar 3/46 (12.5 overs)		217 (74.5 overs); Matt Renshaw 45 (94); Shakib Al Hasan 5/68 (25.5 overs)
221 (79.3 overs); Tamim Iqbal 78 (155); Nathan Lyon 6/82 (34.3 overs)		244 (70.5 overs); David Warner 112 (135); Shakib Al Hasan 5/85 (28 overs)

Bangladesh won by 20 runs
Sher-e-Bangla National Cricket Stadium, Mirpur, Dhaka
Umpires: Aleem Dar (Pak) and Nigel Llong (Eng)
Player of the match: Shakib Al Hasan (Ban)

- Bangladesh won the toss and elected to bat.
- Shakib Al Hasan and Tamim Iqbal (Ban) both played their 50th Test match.
- Nathan Lyon took his 250th wicket in Tests.
- Shakib Al Hasan (Ban) became the fourth bowler to take a five-wicket haul against all nine Test-playing sides. (Note: Twelve teams have Test status, with Afghanistan and Ireland being awarded it in 2017. Neither team had yet played their first Test.)
- This was Bangladesh's first win against Australia in Tests.

=== 2nd Test ===
4–8 September 2017
Scorecard

Bangladesh	v	Australia
305 (113.2 overs); Mushfiqur Rahim 68 (196); Nathan Lyon 7/94 (46.2 overs)		377 (119.5 overs); David Warner 123 (234); Mustafizur Rahman 4/84 (30.5 overs)
157 (71.2 overs); Mushfiqur Rahim 31 (103); Nathan Lyon 6/60 (33 overs)		87/3 (28.3 overs); Glenn Maxwell 25* (46); Mustafizur Rahman 1/16 (5 overs)

Australia won by 7 wickets
Zohur Ahmed Chowdhury Stadium, Chittagong
Umpires: Ian Gould (Eng) and Nigel Llong (Eng)
Player of the match: Nathan Lyon (Aus)

- Bangladesh won the toss and elected to bat.
- No play was possible before lunch on day 3 due to rain.
- Nathan Lyon's match figures of 13/154 were the best by an Australian bowler in Asia.
- Nathan Lyon also took the most wickets in a two-Test series by an Australian bowler (22).
- Glenn Maxwell (Aus) played in his last Test.
