= Hall O'Meagher =

Australian cricketer

Personal information
- Full name: Hall O'Meagher
- Born: 27 January 1974 (age 52); Canberra, Australian Capital Territory
- Batting: Right-handed
- Bowling: Right-arm off-break
- Role: Bowler

Domestic team information
- Years: Team
- 1997/98–1998/99: ACT Comets

Career statistics
Competition	List A
Matches	12
Runs scored	28
Batting average	5.60
100s/50s	0/0
Top score	14*
Balls bowled	654
Wickets	10
Bowling average	48.30
5 wickets in innings	0
10 wickets in match	0
Best bowling	2/31
Catches/stumpings	2/–
- Source: CricketArchive, 29 August 2020

Hall O'Meagher (born 27 January 1974) is a former cricketer who played List A cricket for the ACT Comets in the Mercantile Mutual Cup.

O'Meagher, a spin bowler, played his club cricket for the ANU.

He featured in all one day matches for the Comets in both the 1997/98 and 1998/99 domestic seasons, a total of 12 overall, for 10 wickets. In a match against Western Australia at Manuka Oval in 1999 he took the wickets of both Justin Langer and Simon Katich.
