= Nathan Lyon =

Australian cricketer (born 1987)

- Lyon in 2026

Personal information
- Full name: Nathan Michael Lyon
- Born: 20 November 1987 (age 38); Young, New South Wales, Australia
- Nickname: The Goat, Garry (Note: After the Australian rules footballer Garry Lyon.)
- Batting: Right-handed
- Bowling: Right-arm off break
- Role: Bowler

International information
- National side: Australia (2011–present)
- Test debut (cap 421): 31 August 2011 v Sri Lanka
- Last Test: 27 October 2026 v South Africa
- ODI debut (cap 194): 8 March 2012 v Sri Lanka
- Last ODI: 11 July 2019 v England
- ODI shirt no.: 67
- T20I debut (cap 77): 29 January 2016 v India
- Last T20I: 28 October 2018 v Pakistan
- T20I shirt no.: 67

Domestic team information
- Years: Team
- 2008/09–2010/11: ACT Comets
- 2010/11–2012/13: South Australia
- 2011/12–2012/13: Adelaide Strikers
- 2013/14–present: New South Wales (squad no. 67)
- 2013/14–2022/23: Sydney Sixers (squad no. 67)
- 2017: Worcestershire
- 2024: Lancashire

Career statistics
Competition	Test	ODI	FC	LA
Matches	145	29	242	81
Runs scored	1,766	77	2,913	240
Batting average	13.08	19.25	12.61	12.63
100s/50s	0/0	0/0	0/2	0/0
Top score	47	30	75	37*
Balls bowled	35,771	1,626	57,582	4,333
Wickets	577	29	870	90
Bowling average	30.34	46.00	32.26	39.41
5 wickets in innings	24	0	31	0
10 wickets in match	5	0	6	0
Best bowling	8/50	4/44	8/50	4/10
Catches/stumpings	69/–	7/–	106/–	35/–
Medal record
Men's cricket
Representing Australia
World Test Championship
Winner	2021-2023
Runner-up	2023–2025
- Source: ESPNcricinfo, 1 November 2026

Nathan Michael Lyon (born 20 November 1987) is an Australian international cricketer. He made his Test debut in 2011 and plays domestic cricket for New South Wales. Lyon is an off-spin bowler and a lower-order right-handed batsman. Statistically the most successful Australian off-spin bowler of all time, Lyon holds the record for the most Test wickets taken by an Australian off-spin bowler, passing Hugh Trumble's 141 wickets in 2015. In January 2021, Lyon played in his 100th Test match during Australia's series against India. As of 2025, Lyon is Australia's second highest Test wicket taker of all time and ranks sixth among all international players in Test cricket with more than 500 wickets.

Lyon has achieved a number of honours for his performances. He has been named in the ICC Test Team of the Year three times (Note: In 2018, 2019, and 2022.) and was the recipient of the Shane Warne Men's Test Player of the Year award in 2019 and 2024. Lyon was a member of the Australian team that won the 2021–2023 World Test Championship.

== Early career ==
Lyon was born in Young, New South Wales, to Stephen and Bronwyn Lyon. He moved from Young to Canberra as a teenager where he went on to play for ACT Cricket's under-17s and under-18s representative teams. Lyon played for Western Districts and University of Canberra Cricket Club in ACT Grade cricket and debuted for the ACT Comets in 2008 in the Cricket Australia Cup against the South Australian Second XI where he claimed a wicket on day one. During his time with Comets, Lyon was mentored by captain and later captain-coach, Mark Higgs, who helped him in his spin bowling, getting his bowling action right as well as the tactical aspect of what lines to bowl and fields to set. After Lyon left the Comets he continued to keep in contact with Higgs in regards to the game.

In 2010, Lyon moved to Adelaide and worked as a member of the ground staff team at the Adelaide Oval. He played for the Prospect Cricket Club in the South Australian Grade Cricket League while continuing playing for the Comets in the Futures League. After Lyon's performance in the 2010 Futures League Twenty20 in December for the Comets in Melbourne which South Australia's Twenty20 coach Darren Berry witnessed he was selected to play for the Southern Redbacks in the KFC Twenty20 Big Bash.

== Domestic career ==
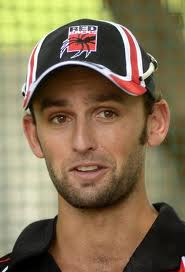
Lyon in 2009

In 2010–11 KFC Twenty20 Big Bash Lyon was the leading wicket-taker where the Redbacks went on to win the competition. Lyon went on to play for South Australia in the Sheffield Shield and the Australian domestic limited-overs competition. In the same year he was selected to represent Australia A in Zimbabwe where he took 11 wickets in the tri-series to be named man of the series. Lyon signed to play in the inaugural season of the Big Bash League for the Adelaide Strikers.

In May 2017 it was announced that Worcestershire had signed Lyon as a replacement for compatriot John Hastings, who was competing in the ICC Champions Trophy. On 15 November 2017, during the final moments of the Sheffield Shield match against Queensland at the Allan Border Field, Lyon was involved in a bizarre incident, burning a piece of toast in the dressing room and causing the smoke alarm to go off, which brought the fire services to the ground and stopped play for 30 minutes.

In November 2019, Lyon signed for Hampshire as their overseas player for the 2020 season in Championship cricket in England. However, this deal was later cancelled due to the COVID-19 pandemic. In February 2021, during the 2020–21 Sheffield Shield season, Lyon took his 600th first-class wicket.

In August 2023, the Melbourne Renegades announced they had signed Lyon on a three-year deal for the Big Bash League starting with the 2023/24 season.

In November 2023 Lancashire County Cricket Club announced that they had signed Lyon as an overseas player for the 2024 domestic season.

== International career ==
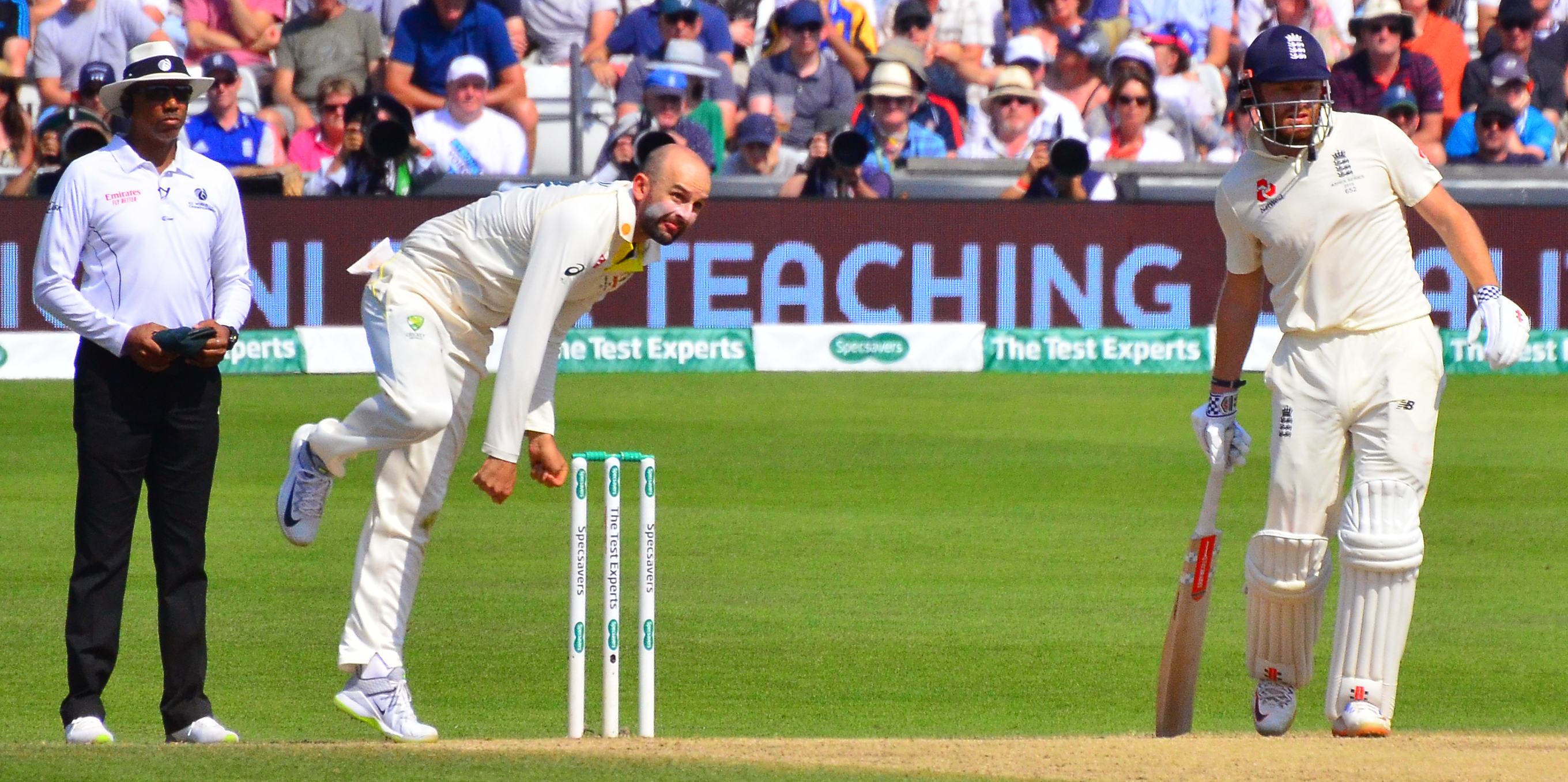
Lyon bowling on day 4 of the third 2019 Ashes Test at Headingley while Jonny Bairstow looks on.

On 26 July 2011, Lyon was selected in the Australian Test squad for the tour to Sri Lanka in 2011. He took two wickets for Australia against the Sri Lanka Board XI in the three-day warm-up match at the Paikiasothy Saravanamuttu Stadium. Lyon made his Test debut against Sri Lanka at Galle on 31 August 2011, he had his Baggy Green cap presented to him by Greg Chappell. Lyon took his first wicket off his first ball in Test cricket on 1 September 2011, his victim was Kumar Sangakkara. With this feat he became the third Australian (and seventeenth international player) to take his first wicket off his first ball in Test cricket, and the first Australian since Arthur Coningham, in 1894. He finished with 5/34 in his first innings, becoming the 131st player to take five wickets on debut in a Test match.

In November 2011, Lyon became just the seventh number 11 batsman to have the top score in his team's innings, when he scored 14 in Australia's second-innings total of 47 in the 1st Test against South Africa. Lyon played his first Test in Australia at the Gabba starting on 1 December 2011 against New Zealand in the first Test match of the series. Lyon took 4/69 in the first innings and 3/19 in his second innings, culminating in match figures of 7/88, the best Test match bowling figures by an Australian off-spinner at the venue. He played in three of the four Tests of the subsequent home series against India—being left out of the team for the third Test on the pace-friendly WACA Ground—taking seven wickets at an average of 41.57. Former Australian off-spinner Ashley Mallett criticised Lyon's delivery method during the series, saying he had been bowling too wide on the crease.

On 24 April 2013, Lyon was named as the only spinner in the upcoming 2013 Ashes series for the Australian squad. It held true until hours before the first match when he was dropped from out of the lineup in favour of shock debutant Ashton Agar, who then went on to score 98 on his Test debut, which was also a world record for a no. 11 batsman. However, Lyon was recalled to the team for the third Ashes Test, and in the fourth Ashes Test at Chester-le-Street, he took figures of 4/42 on the first day to help restrict England to 238 in their first innings. On 28 December 2013, during the Boxing Day Test match at the Melbourne Cricket Ground, Lyon took his 100th Test wicket and also his first five wicket haul in Australia. He became just the sixth Australian off-spinner to take 100 Test wickets.

On 5 January 2014, Lyon became only the second cricketer ever to not be dismissed in any innings during a five-Test series. Lyon made 60 runs during his six innings, with a strike rate of 52.63. On 13 December 2014, Lyon was named man of the match in the first Test of the Border–Gavaskar Trophy series against India at the Adelaide Oval after taking a personal best haul for the match of 5 for 134 in the first innings and 7 for 152 in the second. This was the first match the Australian team had played after the death of Phillip Hughes just two weeks earlier. After taking the final wicket of the match to secure the victory for Australia, Lyon knelt down and patted Hughes's Test number 408 that had been painted on the field for the match.

In 2015, Lyon was not named in Australia's final squad of 15 for the 2015 Cricket World Cup. Xavier Doherty was picked in his place as a specialist spin bowler. In June 2015, Lyon took his 142nd Test wicket, passing Hugh Trumble to become the most prolific wicket-taker of all Australian off-spinners.

Lyon made his Twenty20 International debut for Australia against India on 29 January 2016. On 28 July 2016, Lyon became the first Australian off-spinner to take 200 Test wickets. He achieved this feat during the first Test against Sri Lanka at the Pallekele Cricket Stadium by dismissing Dhananjaya de Silva. During the 2016 Test series between Australia and South Africa, the phrase "Nice, Garry!" became affectionately associated with Lyon after wicketkeeper Matthew Wade repeatedly yelled it after every ball bowled by the spinner (a joking reference to the Melbourne FC footballer Garry Lyon). This phrase was adopted by cricket fans throughout Australia, elevating Lyon to cult-hero status. A Facebook campaign was started up for fans at the 2016 Boxing Day Test against Pakistan to yell "Nice, Garry!" in unison after Lyon's third ball bowled; however, their attempts were replaced by cheering, as he took the wicket of Sami Aslam with his third delivery.

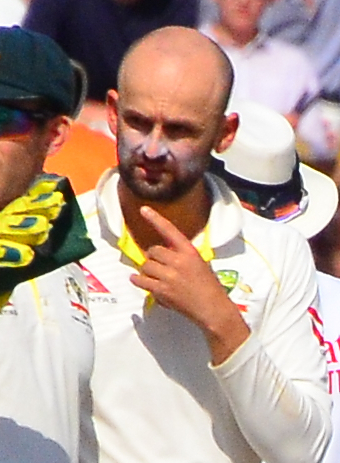
Lyon in 2019

On 4 March 2017, in the second Test between Australia and India in Bangalore as part of the 2017 Australian tour of India, Lyon took figures of 8/50 and finished with the best figures ever recorded in India by a visiting bowler. On 27 August 2017, Lyon became the 8th Australian bowler and the second Australian spinner after Shane Warne to take 250 Test wickets. He achieved this feat during the first Test against Bangladesh at the Sher-e-Bangla National Cricket Stadium by dismissing Mehedi Hasan Miraz. In September 2017, in the second Test between Australia and Bangladesh in Chittagong as part of the 2017 Australian tour of Bangladesh, Lyon took match figures of 13/154 and finished with the best figures ever recorded in Asia by an Australian bowler. He also took the most wickets in a two-Test series by an Australian bowler (22).

Having missed out on the Champions Trophy squad, Lyon replaced John Hastings to play for Worcestershire. In 2017, Lyon became an Australian Apprenticeships Ambassador for the Australian Government. He would finish the year by taking more Test wickets than anyone else (63).

On 6 March 2018, Lyon was fined 15 per cent of his match fee for a breach of the ICC Code of Conduct during the first Test against South Africa in Durban. Lyon took his 300th Test wicket during the 3rd Test in Cape Town by dismissing Kagiso Rabada out stumped. In April 2018, he was awarded a national contract by Cricket Australia for the 2018–19 season. Lyon finished the India–Australia Test series with 21 wickets and as the highest wicket taker, along with Jasprit Bumrah.

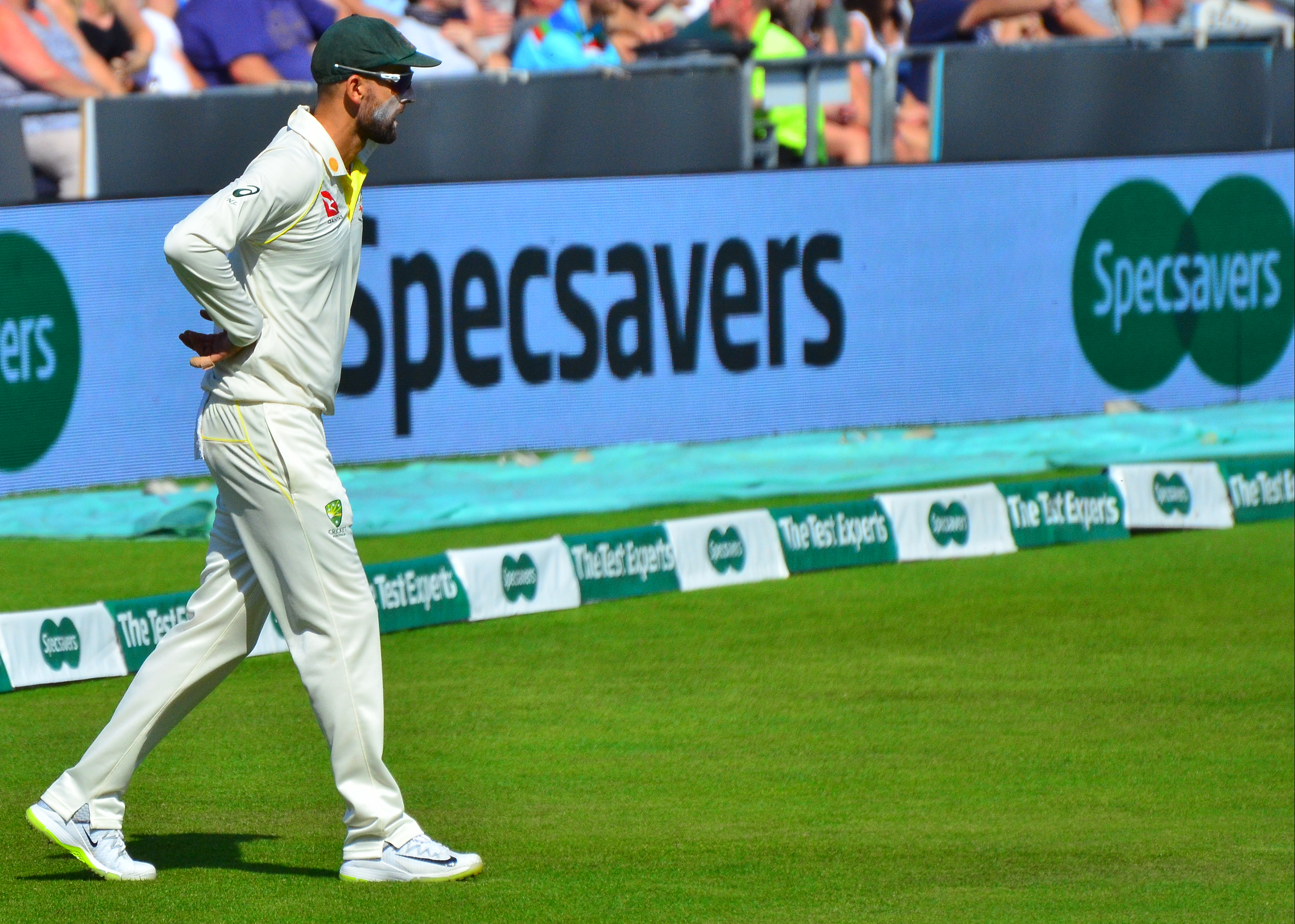
Lyon in 2019

Lyon awarded the Men's Test Player of the Year at the Allan Border Medal ceremony by the CA in 2019. In April 2019, he was named in Australia's squad for the 2019 Cricket World Cup. In July 2019, he was named in Australia's squad for the 2019 Ashes series in England. In the first Test of the 2019 Ashes, his figures of 3/112 in the first innings 6/49 in the second innings helped Australia to win a Test at Edgbaston for the first time in 19 years. Australia went on to retain The Ashes for the first time in 18 years. In November 2019, Lyon took seven wickets in two Tests against Pakistan, including a five-wicket haul in Adelaide. In the following series against New Zealand, Lyon was the leading wicket taker between both teams, finishing the series with 20 wickets as Australia won the series 3–0. This was capped off with match figures of 10/118 in the New Year's Test in Sydney, taking five wickets in each innings.

On 16 July 2020, Lyon was named in a 26-man preliminary squad of players to begin training ahead of a possible tour to England following the COVID-19 pandemic. On 14 August 2020, Cricket Australia confirmed that the fixtures would be taking place, with Lyon included in the touring party. On 11 December 2021, during the first match of the 2021–22 Ashes series, Lyon took his 400th Test wicket by dismissing Dawid Malan.

On 2 March 2023, Lyon become the highest wicket-taker in the Border-Gavaskar Trophy during the second day of the third test in Indore with a total of 112 wickets. He finished the match with figures of 11/99, taking 3 wickets in the first innings and 8 in the second, earning him player of the match honours. In the fourth test in Ahmedabad, Lyon broke the record of most wickets taken by an overseas bowler in India, surpassing Derek Underwood by taking his 56th wicket in the country.

In the 2023 ICC World Test Championship Final, Lyon recorded figures of 1/19 and 4/41 as Australia defeated India by 209 runs.

In the first test of the 2023 Ashes series at Edgbaston, Lyon took figures of 4/149 and 4/80 in each innings. In the fourth innings, Lyon came to crease with Australia 8/227, 54 runs short of the winning target of 281. Forming a 55 run partnership with Pat Cummins, Lyon helped Australia to an unlikely two wicket win, ending the match with 16 not out off of 28 deliveries. In the second test of the series at Lord's, Lyon became the first specialist bowler in history to play 100 consecutive test matches, a streak that dated back to the 2013 Ashes series a decade prior. He recorded his 496th test wicket in the first innings by dismissing Zak Crawley before succumbing to a significant calf strain on day 2, which prevented him from bowling in the remainder of the test. Despite arriving to the ground on crutches and having difficulty walking, Lyon came to the crease to bat in Australia's second innings and put on a 15 run partnership with Mitchell Starc, scoring 4 runs himself. He received a standing ovation from the crowd and praise for his bravery in batting despite the nature of his injury. It was confirmed on the day following the test that Lyon would miss the remainder of the series as a result of the injury. This meant his streak of 100 consecutive test matches going back to the 2013 Ashes was broken.

Lyon returned to test cricket in December 2023 for the match between Pakistan and Australia in Perth. He took his 500th test wicket by dismissing Faheem Ashraf lbw after a review. Just two balls later Lyon got his 501st test wicket by bowling Aamer Jamal. He finished the match with five wickets in all, which helped Australia to a comprehensive victory by 360 runs.

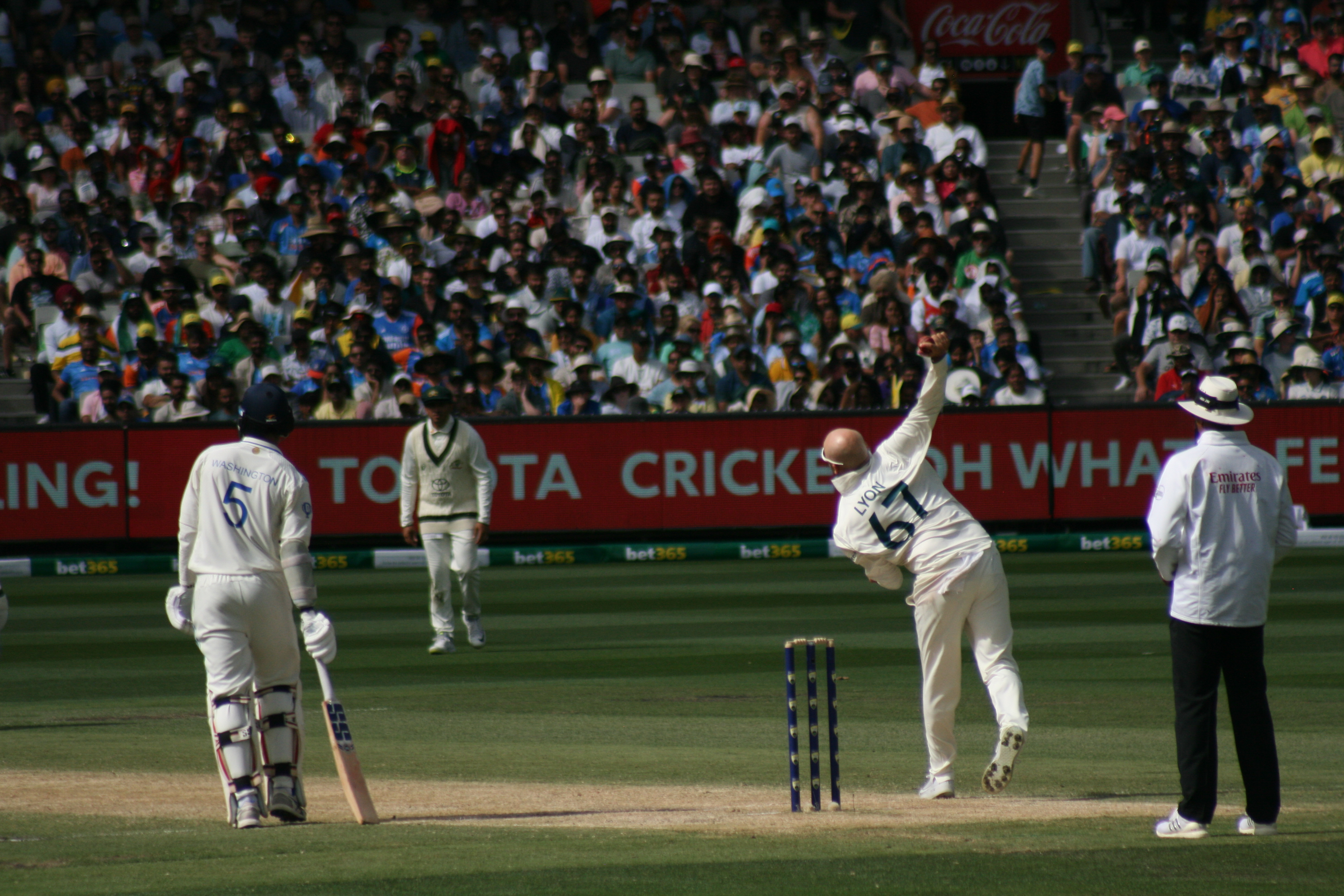
Nathan Lyon bowling in the 4th Test Match of the 2024–25 Border–Gavaskar Trophy.

Lyon played in the 2024–25 Border–Gavaskar Trophy. He took 9 wickets across all 5 Test matches, with one being the match-winning wicket against Mohammed Siraj in a thrilling victory in Melbourne, trapping him out LBW. He bowled at an average of 36.88 for the series.

During the 2025–26 Ashes series, Lyon took 5 wickets at an average of 31.40, only playing 2 matches for the series because of not being selected for the Brisbane Test, and suffering a series-ending hamstring injury during the 4th innings of the 3rd Test at the Adelaide Oval while trying to field a ball. Lyon's efforts in the third Test, as by getting wickets such as bowling Harry Brook and getting Zak Crawley out stumped, helped Australia win the match and clinch the trophy, continuing their hold of the trophy since the 2017–18 Ashes series.

== Personal life ==
Lyon has two children with ex-partner Mel Waring. He married Emma McCarthy in July 2022.

Lyon's older brother, Brendan, is his personal batting coach.

Lyon is a supporter of the Canberra Raiders in the National Rugby League.

== Awards ==
ICC Test Team of the Year: 2018, 2019, 2022

Australian Men's Test Player of the Year: 2019, 2024

Sheffield Shield Player of the Year: 2020-21

== See also ==
- List of international cricket five-wicket hauls by Nathan Lyon
