= Blake Dean (cricketer) =

Australian cricketer

Personal information
- Full name: Blake Sydney Dean
- Born: 15 September 1987 (age 39); Bathurst, New South Wales, Australia
- Height: 1.88 m (6 ft 2 in)
- Batting: Right-handed
- Bowling: Right-arm leg spin
- Role: All-rounder

Domestic team information
- Years: Team
- 2010/11–2015/16: Australian Capital Territory
- 2013/14: Sydney Thunder
- Source: Cricinfo, 21 December 2013

Blake Sydney Dean (born 15 September 1987) is an Australian cricketer. He was a right-handed batsman and right arm leg spin bowler until he trained himself to bat and bowl left handed after suffering a shoulder injury.

He was captain/coach of the Queanbeyan District Cricket Club, playing for the ACT Comets in the Futures League and Sydney Thunder in the Big Bash League.

== Domestic and Club Career ==
Blake Dean played for the University of New South Wales in Sydney (2008/09, 2009/10), then Canberra clubs Queanbeyan District Cricket Club (2010/11, 2011/12) and Tuggeranong Valley (2012/13). In 2013-2014 Blake Dean was captain coach of the Queanbeyan District Cricket Club in the ACT Cricket Competition.

In 2010-11 he scored 102 for UNSW vs. Parramatta, then took 32 wickets at 17.63 for Queanbeyan District Cricket Club. In 2011-12 for Queanbeyan District Cricket Club he hit 828 runs at 31.85 and took 35 wickets at 21.14 as his side won the Two-Day, One-Day, T20 and SCG Cup. In the Two-Day Grand Final, coming in at 87-5 he scored 130 off 191 balls. In 2012/13, playing for Tuggeranong Valley he hit 677 runs at 33.85 (including a 163) and took 30 wickets at 17.67. In the 2013–14 season, end of December 2013 he had scored 100 against Weston Creek Molonglo, three other 1st grade half centuries and a half century in the SCG Cup, as well as having taken 23 wickets at an average of 18.22.

=== ACT Comets ===
Blake Dean plays for the Canberra Comets. In 2011-12 he took 7 wickets and hit a 31-ball 50 against New South Wales Under-23s. In 2012-13 he took 8 wickets at 18.25 for the Comets, including 4–40 against Victoria.

=== Sydney Thunder ===
Dean was signed for the Sydney Thunder for the 2013–2014 Season. He played his first game for them on 21 December 2013 against the Sydney Sixers, taking one wicket from two overs. He was bowled for 3 by Brett Lee.

== Coaching career ==
Dean is an accredited level two coach. In 2009 he coached at Hambledon and 2010 at Carlton in the UK. In 2014 he will coach at Bangor CC in Wales.

== Other ==
Blake Dean's brother Jono also plays for the Weston Creek Molonglo Cricket Club 1st grade side in the ACT grade cricket competition and also plays for the ACT Comets.

His transition to learn to play cricket left handed was covered in the documentary The Southpaw Project.
