= Lea Hansen =

Lea Hansen may refer to:

- Lea Hansen (cricketer)
- Lea Hansen (handballer)
