= Second XI =

Second XI may refer to:

- Second XI Championship, a cricket competition in England and Wales, the tier underneath the County Championship
- Second XI (Australian cricket competition), a cricket completion in Australia, the tier underneath the Sheffield Shield
