= New Zealand cricket team in Australia in 2011–12 =

2011–12 Trans-Tasman Trophy
| | Australia | New Zealand |
- Dates: 18 November – 13 December 2011
| Captains | Michael Clarke | Ross Taylor |

Test series
- Result: 2-match series drawn 1–1
| Most runs | Michael Clarke (161) | Dean Brownlie (198) |
| Most wickets | James Pattinson (14) | Doug Bracewell (10) |
- Player of the series: James Pattinson (Aus)

The New Zealand cricket team toured Australia from 18 November – 13 December 2011. The tour consisted of two Tests played for the Trans-Tasman Trophy.

The series was drawn 1–1, so the trophy was retained by Australia. New Zealand's win in the second Test in Hobart was its first Test win in Australia since 1985, and their first test match victory against Australia since 1993 and their most recent to date.

== Squads ==
| Australia | New Zealand |
|---|---|
| Michael Clarke (c); Brad Haddin (vc, wk); Ben Cutting; Phil Hughes; Michael Hussey; Usman Khawaja; Nathan Lyon; James Pattinson; Ricky Ponting; Peter Siddle; Mitchell Starc; David Warner; Daniel Christian | Ross Taylor (c); Doug Bracewell; Martin Guptill; Chris Martin; Tim Southee; BJ Watling; Reece Young (wk); Trent Boult; Dean Brownlie; Brendon McCullum (vc) (wk); Jesse Ryder; Daniel Vettori; Kane Williamson |

== Tour matches ==
=== New South Wales XI v New Zealanders ===
18–20 November

| New South Wales XI | v | New Zealanders |

Cancelled
Blacktown Olympic Park, Sydney

=== Australia A v New Zealanders ===
24–27 November
Scorecard

| New Zealanders | v | Australia A |
| 423 (97 overs); Brendon McCullum 146 (115); James Pattinson 4/96 (19 overs) | | 395 (109.3 overs); Ed Cowan 145 (270); Doug Bracewell 4/87 (19.3 overs) |
| 6/467 (108 overs); Jesse Ryder 175 (137); Ben Cutting 2/61 (14 overs) |

Match Drawn
Allan Border Field, Brisbane
Umpires: Simon Fry and Paul Reiffel (Both Aus)

- Australia A won the toss and elected to field

== Test Series (Trans-Tasman Trophy) ==
=== 1st Test ===
1–5 December
Scorecard

| New Zealand | v | Australia |
| 295 (82.5 overs); Daniel Vettori 96 (127); Nathan Lyon 4/69 (21.5 overs) | | 427 (129.2 overs); Michael Clarke 139 (249); Chris Martin 3/89 (28 overs) |
| 150 (49.4 overs); Dean Brownlie 42 (127); James Pattinson 5/27 (11 overs) | | 1/19 (2.2 overs); David Warner 12* (4); Chris Martin 1/0 (1 over) |

Australia won by 9 wickets
The Gabba, Brisbane
Umpires: Aleem Dar (Pak) and Asad Rauf (Pak)
Player of the match: James Pattinson (Aus) (As voted for by users within Australia of a phone app promoted on Channel Nine)

- New Zealand won the toss and elected to bat
- Match delayed by bad light on Day 1 (and rain), 2
- Test Debuts: James Pattinson, Mitchell Starc, David Warner (All Aus)

Three Australia players, opening batsman David Warner and fast bowlers James Pattinson and Mitchell Starc, made their Test debuts in this match, after injuries to five players (batsmen Shane Watson and Shaun Marsh, and fast bowlers Ryan Harris, Mitchell Johnson and Pat Cummins), all of whom played in Australia's 1–1 series tie against South Africa earlier that month.

Day 1

New Zealand won the toss and chose to bat. Australia had the upper hand in the morning session, reducing New Zealand to 4/94 at lunch, with only Brendon McCullum (34) making more than twenty. A fifth wicket fell just after lunch, before Dean Brownlie and Daniel Vettori stabilised the innings. The pair added eighty runs without loss before play was called off due to rain and bad light before tea. New Zealand was 5/176 at stumps.

Day 2

Brownlie (77*) and Vettori (96) continued at the start of Day 2, extending their sixth wicket partnership to 158 runs before Vettori was run out. New Zealand collapsed from 5/254 to 8/259, before being dismissed for 295 just before lunch. Nathan Lyon cleaned up the tail, and finished with four wickets for Australia.

New Zealand dismissed the Australian openers cheaply to reduce Australia to 2/25 early in the afternoon session, but Australia recovered to reach 3/154 when stumps were drawn on Day 2, again early due to bad light.

Day 3

Australia added 100 runs for the loss of two wickets in the morning session, including Ricky Ponting (78). The new ball taken almost immediately after the lunch break, and Michael Clarke (139) and Brad Haddin (80) survived to add 108 runs for the sixth wicket before Clarke's dismissal. Haddin then batted with the tail, and Australia added another 82 runs for the last four wickets, the most notable contribution coming from Mitchell Starc (32*). Australia was dismissed for 427, a lead of 132, with seven overs remaining in the day. Chris Martin was the top wicket-taker with three.

New Zealand lost McCullum (1) in the final over of the day's play, and finished at 1/10.

Day 4

In the first hour of Day 4, debutant fast bowler James Pattinson (5/27) dismissed the entire New Zealand top order to reduce the Black Caps to 5/28. Pattinson took the first five wickets of the innings, including McCullum (1) on Day 3, then Martin Guptill (12), Kane Williamson (0), Ross Taylor (0) and nightwatchman Doug Bracewell (2). Australia went on to dismiss New Zealand for 150 midway through the afternoon session; Dean Brownlie (42) was the top scorer.

Needing only 19 runs for victory, Australia made the runs inside three overs for the loss of one wicket. Debutant David Warner scored the winning runs.

James Pattinson (1/64 & 5/27) was voted Man of the Match.

=== 2nd Test ===
9–13 December
Scorecard

| New Zealand | v | Australia |
| 150 (45.5 overs); Dean Brownlie 56 (85); James Pattinson 5/51 | | 136 (51 overs); Peter Siddle 36 (58); Doug Bracewell 3/20 (10 overs) |
| 226 (78.3 overs); Ross Taylor 56 (169); Nathan Lyon 3/25 (7.3 overs) | | 233 (63.4 overs); David Warner 123* (170); Doug Bracewell 6/40 (16.4 overs) |

New Zealand won by 7 runs
Bellerive Oval, Hobart
Umpires: Asad Rauf (Pak) and Nigel Llong (Eng)
Player of the match: David Warner (Aus) (As voted for by users within Australia of a phone app promoted on Channel Nine)

- Australia won the toss and elected to field
- Match delayed by rain on Day 1 and 3
- Test Debuts: Trent Boult (NZ)
- Australia's 136 is their third-lowest total against New Zealand, and their lowest at home. It was their first defeat against New Zealand at home since 1985 and their most recent test loss to New Zealand to date.

Uncapped fast bowler Trent Boult was brought into the New Zealand team to replace Daniel Vettori, who pulled out late with an injury. The Australian team was unchanged from the first Test.

Day 1

After winning the toss on a very green pitch, Australian captain Michael Clarke elected to field on Day 1. The Australian bowlers dominated play on Day 1, dismissing New Zealand for 150 at tea, with only Dean Brownlie (56) managing more than twenty runs. Australia had reduced New Zealand to 6/60 in the morning session, but Brownlie's partnerships with Doug Bracewell (45 runs for the seventh wicket) and Tim Southee (41 runs for the eighth wicket) helped New Zealand to a score of 150. James Pattinson (5/51) was the top wicket taker, and took five wickets for the second consecutive innings; Peter Siddle took three wickets.

Australia faced only 4.2 overs, reaching 1/12, before rain stopped play.

Day 2

With the pitch still green and assisting the fast bowlers, New Zealand dominated Day 2 just as Australia had Day 1. Chris Martin (3/46) dismissed the Australian top three, and Bracewell (3/20) and Trent Boult (3/29) also took three wickets apiece, as Australia was reduced to 7/75 before being dismissed for 136 late in the afternoon session. A 56-run partnership between tail-enders Siddle (36) and Pattinson (17) provided the only resistance for Australia. This gave New Zealand a 14-run lead on the first innings.

New Zealand reached tea without loss, before losing both openers in quick succession after tea to fall to 2/36. In conditions which still suited the bowlers, New Zealand added 103 runs for the loss of only one wicket for the rest of the day, finishing at 3/139 at stumps.

Day 3

After dismissing Kane Williamson (34) in the first over of the day, Australia took New Zealand's seven remaining wickets for only 87 runs in the morning session. Nathan Lyon (3/26), James Pattinson (3/54) and Peter Siddle (3/66) took three wickets each. Other than Williamson and top-scorer Ross Taylor (56), there were few strong contributions from New Zealand's batsmen. Debutant Trent Boult (21 from 13 balls) helped to add 23 runs for the tenth wicket to extend New Zealand's score to 226, and set Australia a target of 241 for victory.

In a rain-interrupted afternoon and evening, Australia faced 19 overs, and openers Phillip Hughes and David Warner reached stumps without loss, with the score 0/72.

Day 4

Play started with Australia requiring 169 runs to win with ten wickets in hand. Hughes (20) was dismissed in the first over, but Warner and Usman Khawaja (23) added another fifty runs for the second wicket, before Khawaja was dismissed with the score 2/122. Australia took the score to 2/159, before Doug Bracewell took three wickets for no score to reduce Australia to 5/159. Australia went to lunch at 5/173, requiring 68 runs with five wickets in hand.

Shortly after lunch, Warner made his maiden Test century, and he and Brad Haddin (15) took the score to 5/192, before two wickets apiece to Tim Southee (2/77) and Doug Bracewell in consecutive overs reduced Australia to 9/199, requiring 42 runs from the last wicket for victory. Opener David Warner and number eleven Nathan Lyon batted together for 8.4 overs, with Lyon twice surviving DRS referrals for lbw appeals. Finally, after a 34 run partnership for the tenth wicket, Lyon (9) was bowled by Bracewell (6/40). Australia was all out for 233, and New Zealand won the match by seven runs. It was New Zealand's first victory against Australia in a test since 1992–93, and its first in Australia since 1985–86. David Warner (123*) carried his bat, one of very few batsmen to achieve the feat in a fourth innings.

David Warner won the Man of the Match award for his 123* in the fourth innings. On a difficult batting pitch, his score was more than double the next highest (56, by Brownlie and Taylor).

== Player of the Match controversy ==
For this series, Cricket Australia chose to allow the Player of the Match to be voted for by users within Australia of a phone app promoted on the Nine Network coverage by Vodafone, the telecommunications company sponsoring the series. This proved controversial in the second Test when Australian batsman David Warner (123*) easily won the award ahead of New Zealand bowler Doug Bracewell (3/20 & 6/40), whose bowling was a big key to the New Zealand victory; votes for Warner outnumbered votes for Bracewell by more than two to one, and home-country favouritism among voters was blamed. Cricket Australia abandoned the voting system after the series, and reverted to the traditional method of having the Player of the Match chosen by a panel of experts.
