= Manuka Oval =

Stadium in Griffith, Australian Capital Territory

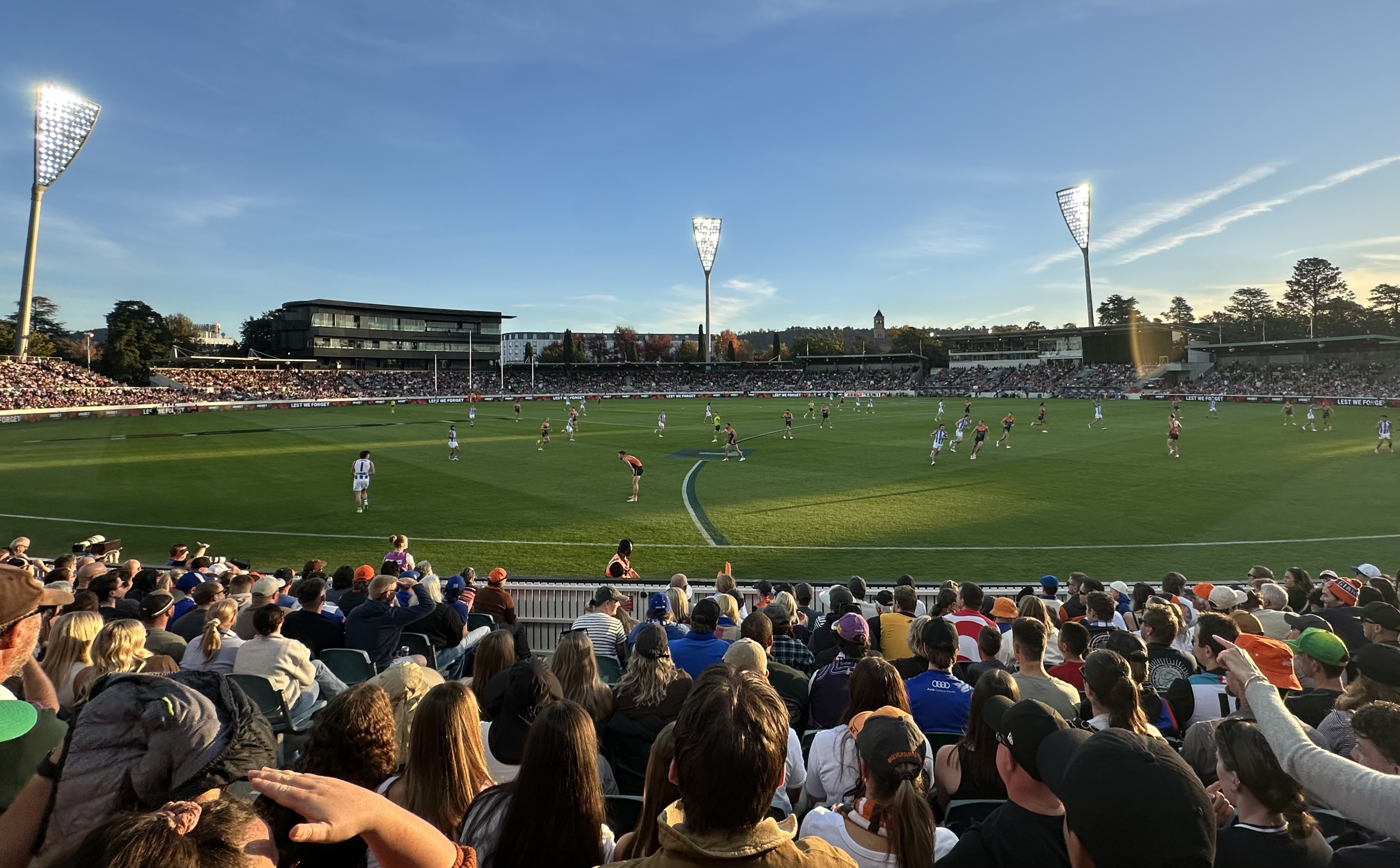
- Manuka Oval during an AFL match in 2026
- Interactive map of Manuka Oval
- Former names: Manuka Circle Park
- Location: Griffith, ACT
- Coordinates: 35°19′5″S 149°08′5″E
- Owner: ACT Government
- Operator: Territory Venues and Events
- Capacity: 15,000 (overall); 13,550 (seated); 12,000 (cricket)
- Surface: Legend (cricket square) Santa Ana (outfield)
- Scoreboard: Jack Fingleton Scoreboard
- Record attendance: 15,807 (Prime Minister's XI vs West Indies, 22 January 1985)
- Field size: 162 m × 138 m (531 ft × 453 ft)

Construction
- Groundbreaking: 1926
- Built: 1929 (enclosed)

Tenant
- List: Australian Football League; GWS Giants (2012–present); Melbourne FC (2007–09); North Melbourne FC (1998, 2001–06); Western Bulldogs (2007–11); Cricket; ACT Comets (1997–2000); ACT Meteors (2009–present); Australian national cricket team (2013–present); Australian women's national cricket team (1988, 2008–09, 2011, 2016–present); Sydney Thunder (BBL; 2018–present); Melbourne Stars (BBL; 2024-present); Sydney Thunder (WBBL; 2018–present); National Rugby League; Canberra Raiders (2001)

Website
- manukaoval.com.au

Ground information
- Country: Australia
- End names
- Pool End; Manuka End

International information
- Only men's Test: 1–4 February 2019: Australia v Sri Lanka
- First men's ODI: 10 March 1992: South Africa v Zimbabwe
- Last men's ODI: 6 February 2024: Australia v West Indies
- First men's T20I: 5 November 2019: Australia v Pakistan
- Last men's T20I: 29 October 2025: Australia v India
- Only women's Test: 27–30 January 2022: Australia v England
- First women's ODI: 7 December 1988: Australia v New Zealand
- Last women's ODI: 3 February 2022: Australia v England
- First women's T20I: 16 January 2011: Australia v England
- Last women's T20I: 28 January 2024: Australia v South Africa
- As of 6 February 2024; Source: Cricinfo

Manuka Oval (known under naming rights as Corroboree Group Oval Manuka) is an Australian rules football and cricket venue located in the Canberra suburb of Griffith. The area on which the ground is situated has been used for sport since the early 20th century, but was only enclosed in 1929.

The Greater Western Sydney Giants have played several home matches at Manuka Oval every year since entering the Australian Football League (AFL) in 2012 and the AFL Women's (AFLW) in 2017. The North Melbourne Football Club also hosted AFL matches at the venue from 1998 until 2006.

Manuka Oval has hosted a number of international cricket matches, including at the 1992 and 2015 World Cups. It was also previously used for rugby league and rugby union matches.

== History ==
The oval was originally a park officially known as "Manuka Circle Park", however by the end of the 1920s it was known as Manuka Oval. The park and nearby shopping centre were named after the Leptospermum scoparium's Māori name, Manuka. There was a push for the park to become an enclosed oval starting in 1926 by various sports groups. Work began on Manuka Oval to erect a fence, along with other improvements made in 1929. The field had previously been used to casually play rugby league and Australian rules football. The first cricket pitch was played on in April 1930. The Bradman Pavilion, the oval's main stand, was constructed in 1962 in honour of Sir Donald Bradman. The Robert Menzies Stand and the Bob Hawke Stand were constructed in 1987 and 1992 respectively and were named after the first two Australian Prime Ministers to bring international cricket teams to Canberra to play against the Prime Minister's XI. In 2004, Manuka Oval celebrated the 75th anniversary of its formal establishment.

Manuka Oval had a $4.3 million upgrade starting from the second half of 2011, which included 4,300 additional temporary seats for the venue, new media and corporate facilities, upgrades to the Hawke and Bradman stands' covering and upgrades to entry facilities. Floodlights were installed at the ground in late 2012 to allow sport to be played at the venue at night, and were first used on 29 January 2013 for a day-night cricket match between the West Indies and the Prime Minister's XI. The lights lean inwards, in order to comply with local height restrictions that prevent any building being higher than Parliament House.

The AFL, through a private consortium, made an $800 million bid to upgrade the precinct in 2018 and expand the seating capacity by 4,750 with covered areas, however the ACT government rejected the proposal.

== Sports played at the ground ==
=== Cricket ===
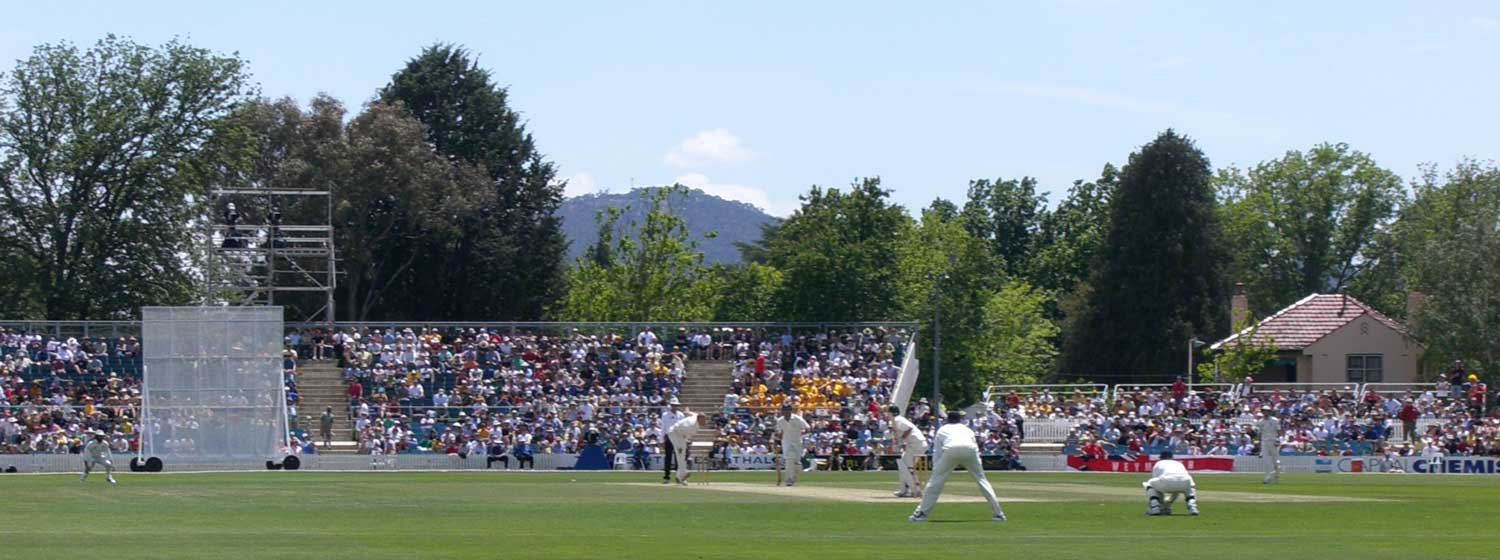
The PM's XI is an annual cricket match at Manuka Oval. The curator's residence is on the right in the background

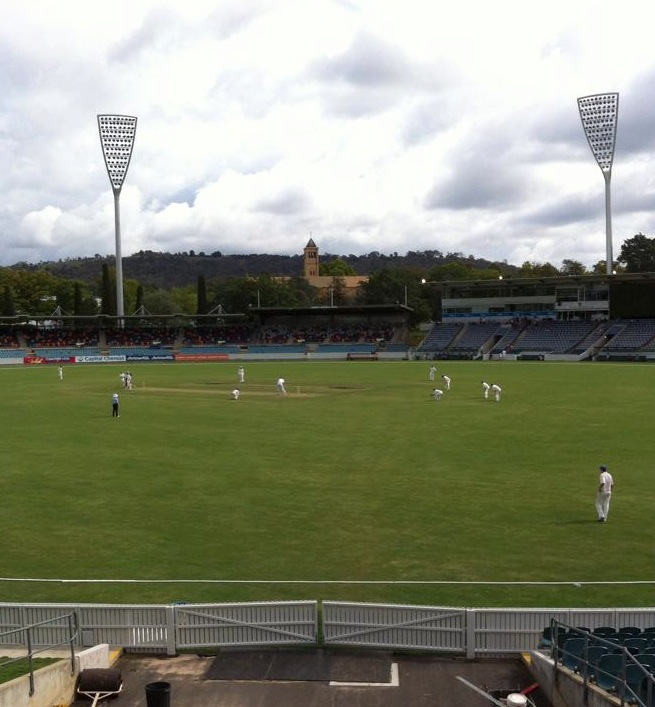
2014 cricket match between Queanbeyan and Wests/UC

The first cricket match to be played at the oval was on Easter Monday, 13 April 1930. The Prime Minister's XI is played at the oval annually. It was started by Robert Menzies in 1951, and there were six more matches up to 1965 in his term as prime minister. The match was brought back in 1984 by Bob Hawke and has been played annually since. In 1992, the ground hosted its first One Day International (ODI) match between South Africa and Zimbabwe as part of the 1992 Cricket World Cup, but otherwise remained largely unused for top level cricket.

In 2015, the ground hosted three One Day International (ODI) matches between Bangladesh and Afghanistan, West Indies and Zimbabwe, South Africa and Ireland as part of the 2015 Cricket World Cup.

The ground is home to the Canberra Comets, who played in the Mercantile Mutual Cup from the 1997–98 season to the 1999–2000 season; the team now plays in the Futures League.

Manuka Oval held its second ODI, and its first as part of a normal international tour, on 12 February 2008 between India and Sri Lanka in the Australian tri-series; and it hosted its first international match featuring Australia on 6 February 2013, in which Australia defeated the West Indies by 39 runs. Top level domestic cricket also returned to the ground from 2011 to 2012, with the New South Wales Blues for three seasons playing a Sheffield Shield and Ryobi One Day Cup match each season; and, the ground hosted the 2013/14 Sheffield Shield final, because the Sydney Cricket Ground was unavailable due to a Major League Baseball series.

The venue sought to host its first Test match in the year 2013 to celebrate the 100th anniversary of the establishment of the city of Canberra, however, the request was not granted.

The ground hosted the final of the 2014–15 T20 Big Bash on 28 January 2015. The first regular season BBL game was held on 24 January 2018 when the Sydney Thunder hosted the Melbourne Renegades. The first WBBL game at the venue was held on the same day.

In April 2018, it was confirmed that the Manuka Oval would host its first ever Test match in February 2019. The match was held from 1 to 5 February 2019 between Australia and Sri Lanka, where four Australian batsmen made centuries.

The most runs scored here in ODI format is by Aaron Finch (348 runs), followed by David Warner (265 runs) and Hashim Amla (261 runs). The most wickets taken here is by Mitchell Starc (7 wickets).

=== Australian rules football ===
Manuka Oval was the home ground of the Manuka Football Club, an Australian Capital Territory Football League club, from 1928 to 1991, when it merged with the Eastlake Football Club. The merged club, which retained the Eastlake name, continues to play home games at Manuka Oval, both in AFL Canberra competitions and in the North East Australian Football League (NEAFL).

The oval has served as an occasional venue for Australian Football League matches since 1998, and a permanent home venue since 2012.

Average AFL and AFLW Attendances at Manuka Oval (source AFL tables.com) View source data.

Between 1998 and 2006, the North Melbourne Football Club, hosted a total of eighteen matches at the venue, playing three games per season from 2001 onwards. Brent Harvey was the only player to have played all 18 AFL games featuring the Kangaroos played at Manuka Oval.

From 2007 until 2009, the Melbourne Demons and the Western Bulldogs each played a home match against the Sydney Swans at the venue; the Bulldogs continued this arrangement in 2010 and 2011.

Since 2012, the newly established Greater Western Sydney Giants have played three home-and-away matches and one pre-season match at the ground each year. The club's first ever AFL win, against the Gold Coast Suns in Round 7, 2012, took place at this venue. The record crowd for the ground was set when 14,974 attended for the match between the Giants and Richmond, a game the Giants won by 88 points holding Richmond to their lowest score, 3.5 (23). The women's team also plays one home-and-away match at Manuka Oval during the AFL Women's season; their opponents in the 2017 and 2018 matches played in Canberra were, on both occasions, the Western Bulldogs. Manuka Oval also hosts the home matches of the Belconnen Magpies and Eastlake Demons in the North East Australian Football League competition as well as all eastern conference finals.

For three seasons beginning with the 2013 AFL season, Manuka Oval was branded as StarTrack Oval during Australian rules football matches. The naming rights deal expired in early 2016. Since 2017 until 2020 the venue has commercially been known as the UNSW Canberra Oval.

As of 2019, Jeremy Cameron holds the record for the most AFL goals kicked at Manuka Oval, kicking 49 goals.

=== Rugby league ===
The second game of the 1948 Great Britain Lions tour was played at the Oval as the touring side beat the Group 8 Rugby League representative side 45–12. During the 1951 French rugby league tour of Australia and New Zealand, Les Chanticleers played a game at the oval against a Monaro side that attracted approximately 5,000 spectators. Manuka Oval hosted one National Rugby League game on 26 May 2001 with the Canberra Raiders moving their game to the ground because of a clash with the ACT Brumbies.

=== Rugby union ===
The Canberra Kookaburras (rugby union) played their home games at Manuka Oval when they competed in the Sydney competition from 1995 until they were excluded from the competition in 2000. The Kookaburras rugby union team rejoined the top Sydney competition in 2004 as the Canberra Vikings however opted to play their home games at Viking Park instead. The Canberra Vikings did make a return to Manuka Oval in 2007 for the Australian Rugby Championship and played three of their four home games at the ground. The other game was played at Canberra Stadium. However the competition was scrapped by the Australian Rugby Union at the end of the year.

=== Others ===
Manuka Oval has also previously hosted boxing and wrestling. In the inaugural year of the National Soccer League in 1977, Canberra City played its home games at Manuka Oval, but moved to the newly built Bruce Stadium in 1978. Hockey was also played at Manuka Oval until the National Hockey Centre was built.

== Ground amenities ==
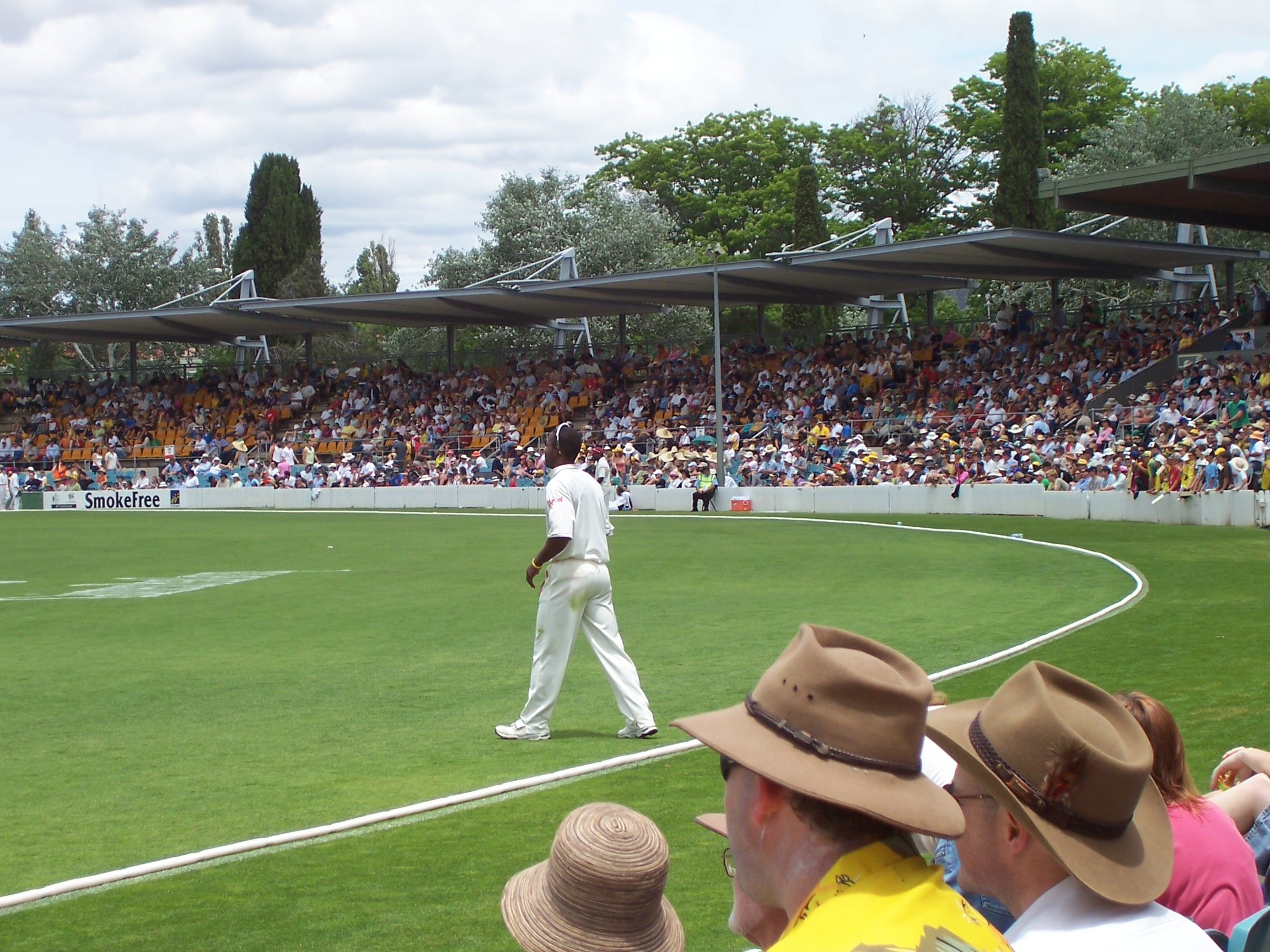
The trees around the oval date back to the 1920s

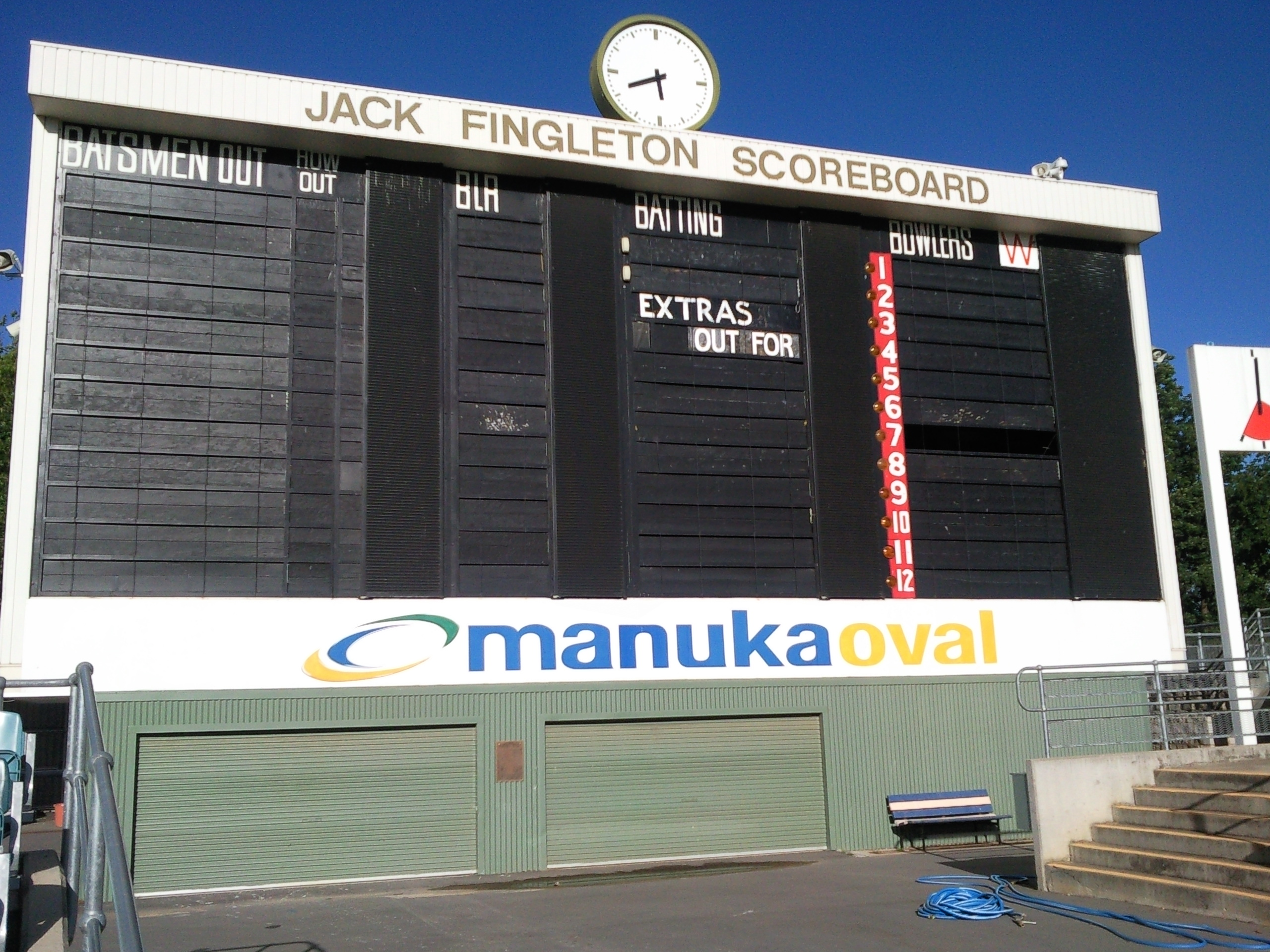
The Jack Fingleton Scoreboard

A two-storey curator's residence is attached to the oval. It was built in the 1930s in the style typically used by the Federal Capital Commission. The trees that circle the oval include cypress, poplar, oak and elm trees, many of which were planted in the 1920s. The Jack Fingleton Scoreboard, originally located at the Melbourne Cricket Ground (MCG), dates to 1901. When an electronic scoreboard was installed at the MCG in the early 1980s, the old scoreboard was relocated to Manuka Oval. The scoreboard is named after Jack Fingleton, an Australian opening batsman, political correspondent in Canberra, and prolific author, who had died shortly before the board's relocation.

== Attendance records ==
=== AFL attendance records ===
No.	Date	Teams	Crowd
1	30 July 2016	Greater Western Sydney v. Richmond	14,974
2	4 June 2006	Kangaroos v. Sydney	14,922
3	18 April 2004	Kangaroos v. Sydney	14,891
4	25 July 2015	Greater Western Sydney v. Geelong	14,667
5	27 May 2007	Western Bulldogs v. Sydney	14,517
6	15 May 2010	Western Bulldogs v. Sydney	14,308
7	5 August 2017	Greater Western Sydney v. Melbourne	14,274
8	28 April 2017	Greater Western Sydney v. Western Bulldogs	14,048
9	25 May 2003	Kangaroos v. Sydney	13,832
10	3 April 2016	Greater Western Sydney v. Geelong	13,656
Source: AFL Attendance Records ^{Last updated on 6 August 2017}

=== Cricket attendance records ===
No.	Date	Teams	Crowd
1	22 January 1985	(Australia) Prime Minister's XI v. West Indies	15,807
2	24 January 1984	(Australia) Prime Minister's XI v. West Indies	14,484
3	22 January 1986	(Australia) Prime Minister's XI v. New Zealand	12,700
4	10 November 2006	(Australia) Prime Minister's XI v. England	11,859
5	28 January 2015	Sydney Sixers v. Perth Scorchers	11,837
6	9 February 2019	Sydney Thunder v. Hobart Hurricanes	11,557
7	6 February 2013	Australia v. West Indies	11,548
8	2 February 2019	Australia v. Sri Lanka (Day 2, Test cricket)	11,388
9	24 January 2018	Sydney Thunder v. Melbourne Renegades	11,319
10	28 January 2004	(Australia) Prime Minister's XI v. India	11,300
Source: Adam Morehouse ^{Last updated on 5 February 2019}
