= Peter Solway =

Australian cricketer (born 1964)

Personal information
- Born: 20 September 1964 (age 62)
- Source: Cricinfo, 15 March 2020

Peter Solway (born 20 September 1964) is an Australian cricketer. He played in eighteen List A cricket matches for the ACT Comets between 1997 and 2000. In February 2020, he was named in Australia's squad for the Over-50s Cricket World Cup in South Africa. However, the tournament was cancelled during the third round of matches due to the COVID-19 pandemic.
