= Second XI (Australian cricket competition) =

Toyota Second XI
- Countries: Australia
- Administrator: Cricket Australia
- Format: Four-day
- First edition: 1999–2000
- Latest edition: 2024–25
- Next edition: 2025–26
- Tournament format: Round-robin tournament
- Number of teams: 7

The Second XI (currently known as the Toyota Second XI under naming rights) is a men's cricket league competed for primarily by Australian state and territory first-class cricket reserve teams. The competition is administered by Cricket Australia and is considered part of the national development pathway.

Ordinarily a low-fanfare competition that exists purely as a bridge between the Sheffield Shield and grade cricket, the tournament reached its peak of public consciousness ahead of the 2009–10 season, when it rebranded to the Futures League. This coincided with a focus on youth, driven by a restriction on teams to field only three players over 23 years of age. This proved unpopular, and age restrictions were relaxed for the 2011–12 season before being removed entirely ahead of the 2013–14 season.

After 21 seasons of consecutive competition, the 2020–21 Second XI was cancelled due to the COVID-19 pandemic preventing play. Upon its resumption in the 2021–22 season, the Second XI abstained from publishing official points tables, meaning that champions are no longer awarded. League champions were previously calculated based on a points quotient that accounted for the varying numbers of matches that each team may play in a season. The most recent championship was awarded in 2019–20 to the Queensland Academy of Sport.

== History ==
The Second XI competition was established in the 1999–2000 season on an experimental basis as the ACB Cup, named after the then Australian Cricket Board (ACB). Competing teams were divided into two groups and played a series of three-day and one-day matches against each other. The competition schedule grew in 2000–01 as each team would play a minimum of four matches per season, with a winner awarded based on a ratio of matches played to matches won. The competition was renamed the Cricket Australia Cup ahead of the 2003–04 season in line with the ACB's rebrand to Cricket Australia.

In 2009, ahead of the 2009–10 season, Cricket Australia revamped the competition to become a youth-focused under-23 tournament. Now known as the Futures League, it limited teams to just three overage players in their squad, and restricted matches to three days. While the format still allowed for two innings per side, each team's first innings overs were limited to 96 and total overs to 144. A week-long Futures League Twenty20 tournament was also added to the schedule.

Beginning in the 2011–12 season, the Futures League returned to four-day matches with no over restrictions and increased the amount of overage players per team to six. However, the age restrictions remained controversial, with West Australian all-rounder Theo Doropoulous describing the league as a "glorified juniors competition" in a July 2013 Tumblr post. This prompted Cricket Australia to remove age restrictions entirely in November 2013.

Ahead of the 2019–20 season, the competition rebranded to the Second XI to better reflect the purpose of the league.

== Teams ==
=== Current teams ===
Team	First season	Total seasons	Titles won (Note: Titles have not been awarded since the conclusion of the 2019–20 season.)	Runners-up (Note: Runners-up placings have not been awarded since the conclusion of the 2019–20 season.)
Australian Capital Territory Second XI	1999–2000	18	1	—
New South Wales Second XI	1999–2000	14	5	3
Queensland Second XI	2021–2022	2	—	—
South Australia Second XI	1999–2000	19	2	1
Tasmania Second XI	1999–2000	19	—	4
Victoria Second XI	1999–2000	19	1	1
Western Australia Second XI	1999–2000	19	2	4

=== Former teams ===
Team	First season	Last season	Total seasons	Titles won	Runners-up
ACT / NSW Country Second XI	2017–18	2022–23	5	—	—
Australian Centre of Excellence XI	2009–10	2009–10	1 (Note: Competed exclusively in the standalone Twenty20 tournament.)	—	—
Australian Cricket Academy	1999–2000	2001–02	3	—	—
Cricket Australia Under-19s XI	2018–19	2018–19	1 (Note: Competed exclusively in the Twenty20 component of the league.)	—	—
New South Wales Under-23s XI	2009–10	2012–13	4	1	1
New South Wales Metropolitan Second XI	2017–18	2022–23	5	—	—
Queensland Academy of Sport XI	1999–2000	2019–20	21	6	3
South Australia Under-23s XI	2009–10	2012–13	4	—	1
Tasmania Under-23s XI	2009–10	2012–13	4	1	—
Victoria Under-23s XI	2009–10	2012–13	4	1	—
Western Australia Under-23s XI	2009–10	2012–13	4	—	1

== Competition format ==
The Second XI competition began in the 1999–2000 season as an experimental tournament conducted by the Australian Cricket Board. Teams played a combination of three-day and one-day matches. As the teams were divided into two groups, no overall champion was awarded. As the tournament expanded the following season, teams now played four-day matches exclusively, although the numbers of matches per season per team did vary.

Four-day cricket continued up until the competition overhaul ahead of the 2009–10 season, which introduced age restrictions and capped overs to the tournament. Matches were reduced to three days for the following two seasons. During this time, a Twenty20 (T20) tournament ran concurrently, and a winner was crowned separately to the full-length competition. Four-day cricket returned from 2011–12 onwards, and the T20 tournament would continue in its own right until the end of the 2014–15 season.

After a three-year hiatus, a T20 component returned to the then-Futures League for the 2018–19 season. Rather than contributing to the overall win-loss ledger, pairs of teams had either eight, six, four or two points added to their full-length season points total depending on their performance in the T20 carnival. This continued in the 2019–20 season, leading to a situation where although Western Australia won the most total matches for the year, they finished second in the overall standings due to T20 results carrying less weight.

Following a year's break in competition due to the COVID-19 pandemic preventing play, the Second XI resumed in the 2021–22 season without official points tables, meaning that champions are no longer awarded.

== Champions ==
=== Full-length competition ===
Year	Champions	Runners-up	Most runs	Most wickets	Player of the Year	Ref.
1999–2000	No champion awarded		[data missing]	[data missing]	—	
2000–01	Western Australia Second XI	Queensland Academy of Sport	Luke Williams (ACA/SA) – 585	Paul Rofe (SA/ACA) – 30	—	
2001–02	New South Wales Second XI	Western Australia Second XI	Brett van Deinsen (NSW) – 438	Shawn Bradstreet (NSW) – 17	—	
2002–03	Queensland Academy of Sport	New South Wales Second XI	David Dawson (ACT) – 552	Andrew Downton (TAS) – 25	—	
2003–04	New South Wales Second XI	South Australia Second XI	Aaron Nye (QAS) – 534	Darren McNees (ACT) – 26	—	
2004–05	Victoria Second XI	New South Wales Second XI	Luke Williams (SA) – 591	Chris Duval (SA) – 16	—	
2005–06	South Australia Second XI	New South Wales Second XI	Ben Cameron (SA) – 551	Gary Putland (SA) – 18	—	
2006–07	New South Wales Second XI	Western Australia Second XI	Peter Forrest (NSW) – 441	Tim MacDonald (WA) – 29	—	
2007–08	Western Australia Second XI	Tasmania Second XI	Liam Davis (WA) – 447	Luke Swards (ACT) – 25	—	
2008–09	New South Wales Second XI	Western Australia Second XI	Usman Khawaja (NSW) – 419	Nathan Lyon (ACT) – 15	—	
2009–10	Victoria Under-23s	New South Wales Under-23s	Brett Forsyth (VIC) – 632	Cullen Bailey (ACT) – 19	—	
2010–11	Australian Capital Territory	Queensland Academy of Sport	Sam Miller (ACT) – 593	Mark Higgs (ACT) – 28	—	
2011–12	Tasmania Under-23s	South Australia Under-23s	Jono Dean (ACT) – 336	Andrew Maher (ACT) – 23	—	
2012–13	New South Wales Under-23s	Western Australia Under-23s	Steven Cazzulino (TAS) – 436	Ryan Duffield (WA) – 18	Nick Winter (ACT)	
2013–14	Queensland Academy of Sport	South Australia Second XI	Dean Russ (VIC) – 350	Shane Devoy (ACT) – 20	Vele Dukoski (ACT)	
2014–15	Queensland Academy of Sport	Tasmania Second XI	David Dawson (ACT) – 593	Cameron Gannon (QAS) – 21	Ben Dunk (TAS)	
2014–15	Queensland Academy of Sport	Tasmania Second XI	David Dawson (ACT) – 593	Cameron Gannon (QAS) – 21	Ben Rohrer (NSW)	
2015–16	New South Wales Second XI	Queensland Academy of Sport	Nick Larkin (NSW) – 697	Liam O'Connor (WA) – 28	Nick Larkin (ACT)	https://www.espncricinfo.com/series/futures-league-2016-17-1036697
2016–17	Tasmania Second XI	Queensland Academy Of Sport	Nick Larkin (NSW) – 521	Nick Winter (SA) – 25	Tom Rogers (ACT)	
2017–18	South Australia Second XI	Victoria Second XI	Peter Forrest (QAS) – 759	Luke Robins (SA) – 31	—	
2018–19	Queensland Academy of Sport	Tasmania Second XI	Henry Hunt (ACT) – 737	Jake Reed (VIC) – 31	—	
2019–20	Queensland Academy of Sport	Western Australia Second XI	Jake Carder (WA) – 581	Liam Hatcher (NSW-M) – 25	—	
2020–21	No competition held due to the COVID-19 pandemic					
2021–22	No champion awarded		Ashley Chandrasinghe (VIC) – 423	Tom O'Connell (VIC) – 19	—	
2022–23	No champion awarded		Charles Wakim (TAS) – 575	Lloyd Pope (SA) – 37	—	

=== Twenty20 competition ===
Year	Premiers	Runners-up	Most runs	Most wickets	Ref.
2009–10	Western Australia Under-23s	Tasmania Under-23s	Jono Dean (ACT) – 157	Ryan Duffield (WA) – 7	
2010–11	Victoria Under-23s	New South Wales Under-23s	Ryan Carters (VIC) – 192	Luke Doran (NSW) – 11	
2011–12	South Australia Under-23s	Queensland Under-23s	Ashton May (TAS) – 183	Steven Reid (VIC) – 11	
