= Queanbeyan District Cricket Club =

- (Australia)

Team information
- Founded: 1863
- Home ground: Freebody Oval Queanbeyan
- Official website: QDCC

Queanbeyan District Cricket Club ('The Bluebags') is a cricket club operating in the Queanbeyan district of New South Wales and playing in the Australian Capital Territory (ACT) cricket competition. It was formally founded in 1863.

== History ==
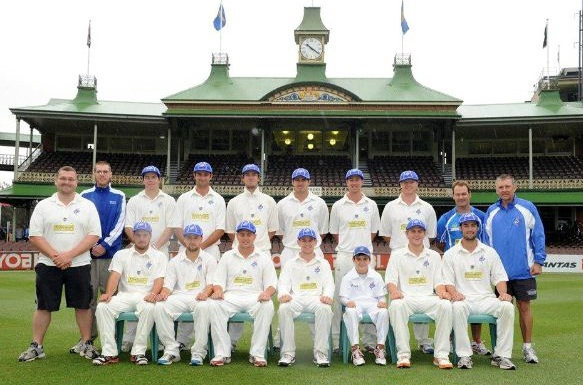
January 2012, Queanbeyan District Cricket Club winners of final of the SCG Country cup against Merewether District Cricket club at the Sydney Cricket Ground

Cricket began to be played in an organised fashion in New South Wales in the 1830s. On January 2, 1863 a meeting of twenty five persons was held in Mr. W. Lee's long room to establish the 'Queanbeyan Cricket Club', "to pay yearly in advance, in order to prevent the breaking down, such as other clubs had, by the trouble of collecting monthly subscriptions." Mr. Wright was elected to the office of president; Mr. WV. Scrivenor, treasurer; Mr. DeLissa, secretary; and Messrs. Morton, Kinseln, Davis and Doyle to be members of the committee. In the 1850s a more informally structured 'Queanbeyan Club' or 'Queanbeyan District Club' had played cricket against teams from Braidwood, Gininderra, Goulburn (the 4th such match being played in 1859) and Yass. Occasional games were also played in the 1850s between the married and single members of the Queanbeyan club. Queanbeyan's first police magistrate Captain AT Faunce died while playing cricket for the Queanbeyan club on 26 April 1856, having been instrumental in introducing cricket to the region (he and his brother having played for a Military team in Sydney in the 1830s including against the Australian Cricket Club at Hyde Park in 1833 and the Racecourse in 1834, as well as against an Australian civilian XI in 1834). His son, the Rev. Canon AD Faunce of the Goulburn Diocese and St Clement's Church at Yass also played for the Queanbeyan Club in the 1850s and 1860s.

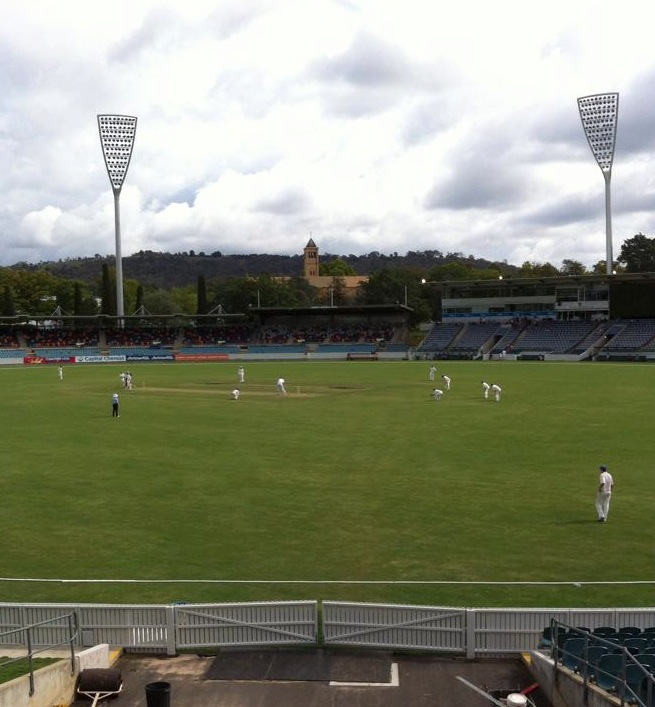
Queanbeyan v Wests/UC 1st grade two-day Grand Final Manuka Oval March 2014

The Queanbeyan District Cricket Club entered the ACT competition with the Federal Territory Cricket Association in the latter's inaugural season in 1922-23. Queanbeyan's home ground at this stage was Queanbeyan Park and it won the Premiership in the 1927-28 and 1928-29 seasons. It was on a canvas-covered concrete pitch on 11–18 December 1926 that Queanbeyan scored 527 (Clarrie and Sid Hincksman scoring 246 and 105 respectively). In the 1935-36 FCTCA final against a Northbourne team that fielded champion Lorne Lees, Tom O'Connor for a Queanbeyan side with only 10 men took 6/27 (off 17.4 overs) and 5/63 before coming to the wicket at 6/127 with 180 needed to win. O'Connor hit 46 (including 13 and 19 off his two overs from Lees, with six fours and a six) of the 53 needed to win the match. Other notable performances by the club included scoring 728 in 10 hours in a semi-final against Ginninderra in 1985-86 (M Frost 164, P Solway 119, J Bull 106, M Thornton 97, M Carruthers 112), its 651 against ANU in 1989-90 (P Solway 339) and the dramatic final win in 1990-91 over Weston Creek (R Regent 63 and P Solway 53 and 43 off 56 balls) with Neil Bulger conceding only 1 run off 11 overs in dismissing Weston Creek for 89 with seven balls left to play. In January 2012, Queanbeyan (with a team including brothers Blake and Jono Dean) won the final of the SCG Country cup against Merewether District Cricket club, Queanbeyan being the first ACT Cricket team to have reached the final (played at the SCG). In the 2011-12 two day Grand Final Blake Dean, batting at 7 with the score 87-5 hit 130 from 191 balls to set up 394 in the first innings. On Feb 2 2013 Jono Dean scored an unbeaten 300 runs in a single day for Queanbeyan against Ginninderra in a Douglas Cup Match; the innings including 17 sixes and 21 fours and was the second highest individual innings in ACT first-grade cricket history. On 2 November 2013 Jono Dean scored 234 and Blake Dean (cricketer) 69 in a total of 6-437 declared against Weston Creek Molonglo The Queanbeyan win by 6 runs against Tuggeranong on 2 Feb 2014 in ACT First grade John Gallop Cup grand final at Manuka oval was regarded as one of the best one day games ever played on the ground. In 2014, after his first year for the ACT Comets, Queanbeyan 1st grade all-rounder Vele Dukoski was named Cricket Australia Futures League 'Player of the Year' and later that week scored a hundred in Queanbeyan's semi-final win.

== Competitions, Management and Home ground ==
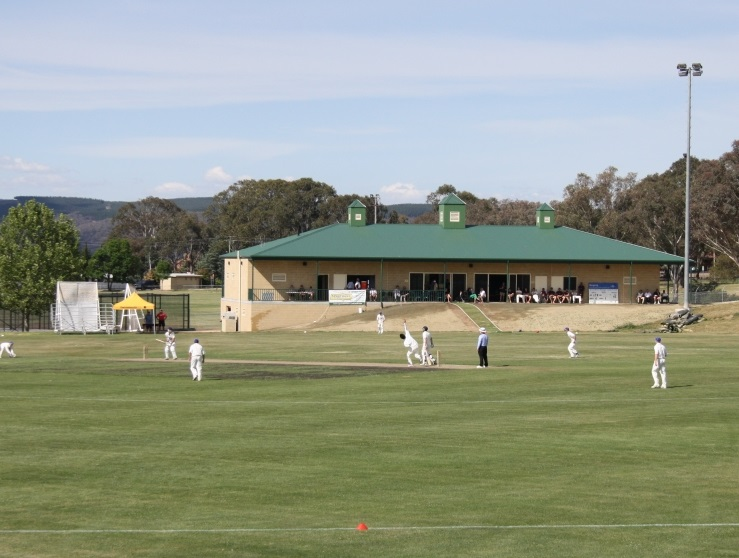
Queanbeyan District Cricket Club pavilion Freebody Oval, Queanbeyan New South Wales.

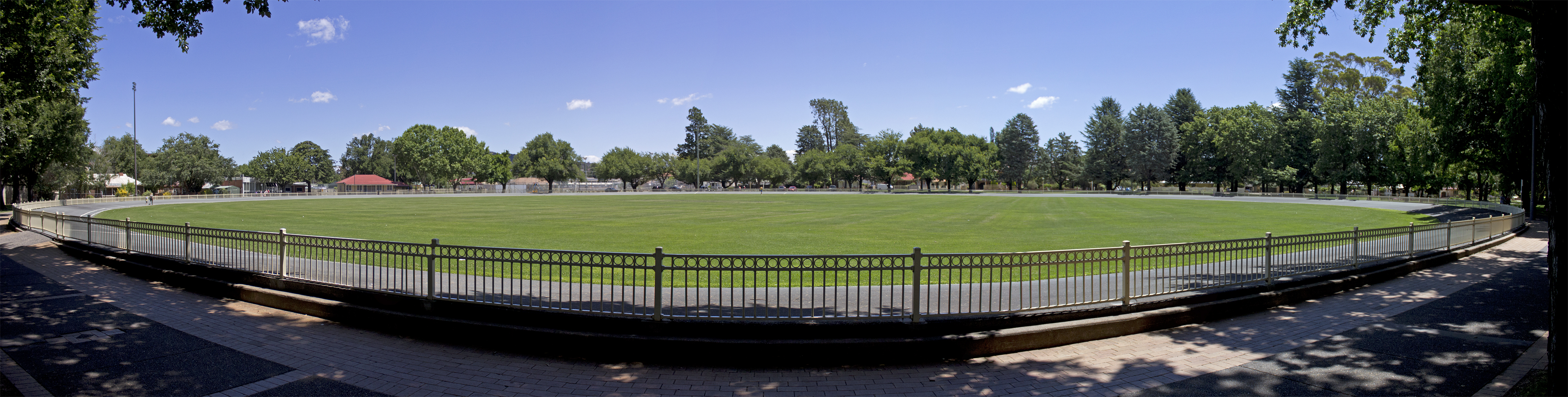
Queanbeyan Park oval by Bidgee

The club fields teams in Cricket ACT Men's Grade Competitions. The club also has strong support for Junior Cricket in the region, mainly through the affiliation with the Queanbeyan and Districts Junior Cricket Club. Current patron is Ian McNamee, President Stephen P Moore, Honorary secretary Ron Bates, Honorary treasurer Dom Di-Campli. Its home oval is Freebody Oval, Richard Avenue, Queanbeyan. The club also plays at Brad Haddin Oval (situated in Queanbeyan Town Park) Queanbeyan and Rockley Oval Googong. Freebody Oval is named after a former Mayor of Queanbeyan whose son Terry was a former captain and excellent all-rounder with the club in from the 1930s to the 1950s.

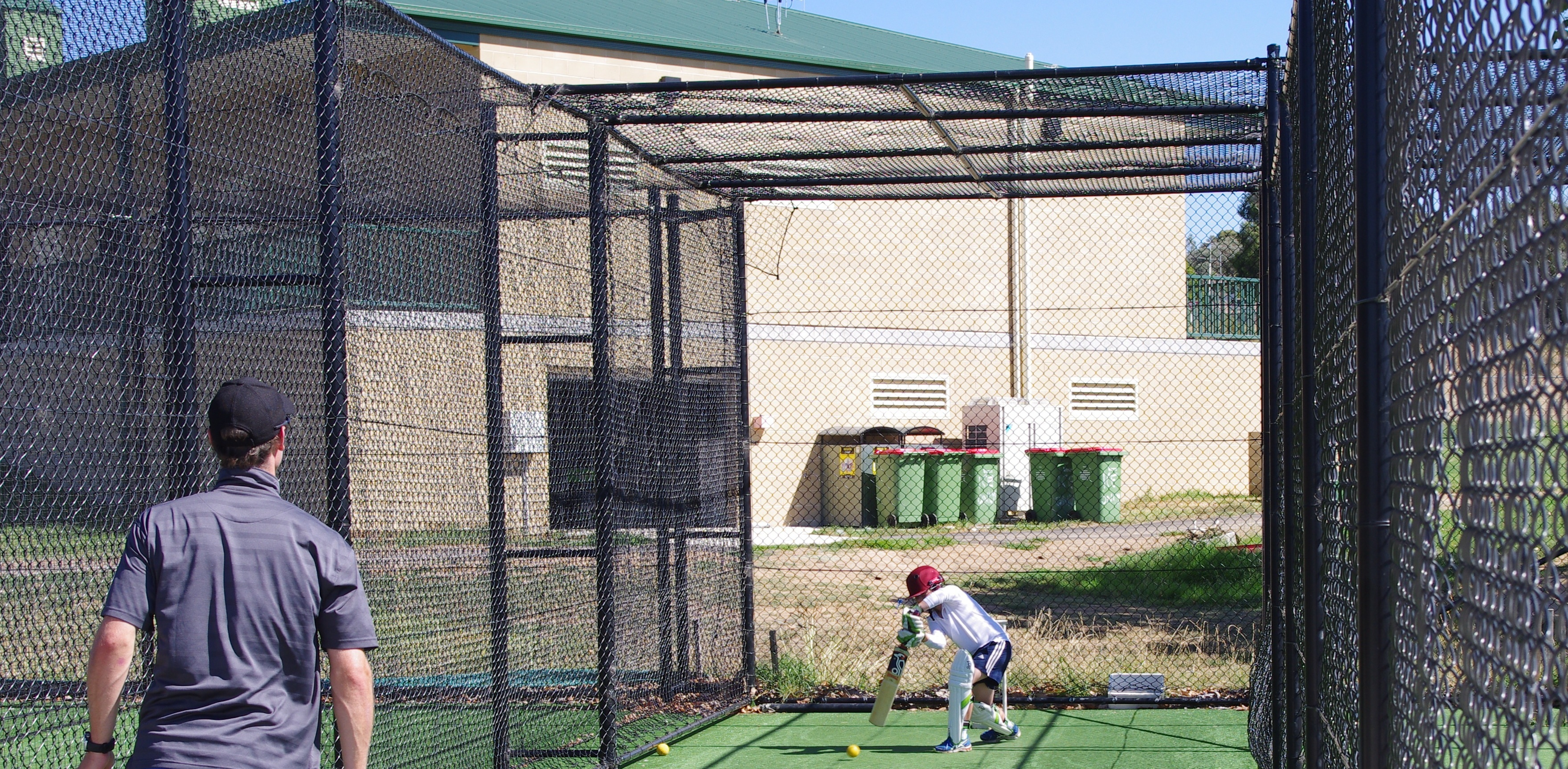
Cricket coaching Freebody Oval

== First grade premierships ==
- Two-day (15): 1927/28, 1928/29, 1935/36, 1939/40, 1957/58, 1980/81, 1982/83, 1985/86, 1986/87, 1987/88, 1990/91, 1991/92, 2009/10, 2010/11, 2011/12.
- Minor Premierships (10): 1927/28, 1928/29, 1934/35, 1939/40, 1957/58, 1982/83, 1987/88, 1989/90, 1991/92, 2013/14.
- One-day (9): 1986/87, 1987/88, 1997/98, 2001/01, 2009/10, 2010/11, 2011/12, 2013/14, 2015/16.
- Twenty20 (6): 2008/09, 2009/10, 2011/12, 2015/16, 202/21, 2021/22.

Other Competitions:

- Twilight (10):1981/82, 1983/84, 1987/88, 1988/89, 1989/90, 1990/91, 1991/92, 1993/94, 1995/96, 1996/97
- Sunday League: 1989/90
- SCG Country Cup: 2011/12.

== Representative players ==
Brad Haddin (NSW, Australia); Mark Higgs (NSW, SA, Australia); Lea Hansen (Vic, Australia A); Neil Bulger (Aust. Indigenous, Australian Veterans Over 60s); Peter Solway (Aust. Country, Australian Veterans Over 50s); John Bull (Aust. Country); Colin Crouch (Aust. Country); Michael Spaseski (Aust. Country); Em Preston (Aust. u/21), Jimmy Martin (Australian Veterans Over 60s), Henry Hunt (Australian U19s, South Australia)

== Life members ==
Jack McNamara, Frank Nash, Doug Moore, Ian Armour, Col Berry, Ray Hatch, Stephen Bailey, Gary Samuels, John Solway, Richard Carruthers, Ian McNamee, Neil Bulger, Michael Frost, Stephen Cross, Peter Solway, Phil Moon, Stephen Frost, Graeme Alexander, Terry Freebody, Winston McDonald, Ron McGlashan, Jim Martin, Ron Bates, Darren Southwell, Rohan Ditton, Mark Higgs.

== List of QDCC 1st Grade Captains ==
Those who have been Captain of QDCC 1st grade team since 1955 are:

From	To	Name
1955	1961	Terry Freebody
1962	1963	Frank Nash
1963	1965	Mal Wheeler
1965	1970	Ian Armour
1970	1971	Terry Walters
1971	1976	Ray Flockton
1976	1977	Lloyd Buckley
1977	1978	Ray Heading
1978	1984	Gary Samuels
1984	1985	Neil Bulger
1985	1989	Mark Thornton
1989	1991	John Bull
1991	1993	Peter Solway
1993	1994	Michael Frost
1994	1995	John Bull
1995	1996	Steve O'Shaugnessy
1996	1998	Robert Regent
1998	2001	Jason Swift
2001	2003	Michael O'Rourke
2003	2004	Stephen Frost
2004	2005	Peter Coleborne
2005	2006	Adam Heading
2006	2009	Mark Higgs
2009	2011	Jono Dean
2011	2013	Aaron Ayre
2013	2014	Blake Dean
2014	2015	Sam Taylor
2015	2017	Vele Dukoski
2017	2018	Michael Spaseski
2018	2022	Mark Solway
2022	Present	Dean Solway

== List of QDCC Presidents ==
Those who have held the office of QDCC President since 1963 are:

From	To	Name
1963	1967	Jack McNamara
1967	1971	Ian Armour
1971	1976	Col Berry
1976	1977	Winston Macdonald
1977	1978	Ray Hatch
1981	1982	Steve Bailey
1982	1983	Steve Bailey & Ray Hatch
1983	1984	Gary Samuels
1984	1986	Greg Mann
1986	1992	Phil Moon
1992	2001	Rod Winchester
2001	2007	Michael Frost
2007	2011	Ian McNamee
2011	2015	Peter Solway
2016	2021	Rohan Ditton
2021	Present	Stephen Moore

== See also ==
- List of cricket clubs in Australia
