= Jason Swift =

Australian cricketer and coach

Personal information
- Full name: Jason John Swift
- Born: 30 October 1970 (age 56); Muswellbrook, New South Wales
- Batting: Left-handed
- Bowling: Right-arm medium

Domestic team information
- Years: Team
- 1998-1999: ACT Comets

Career statistics
Competition	List A
Matches	9
Runs scored	97
Batting average	12.12
100s/50s	0/0
Top score	25
Catches/stumpings	3/-
- Source: CricketArchive, 3 February 2023

Jason John Swift (born 30 October 1970) is a cricket coach and former List A cricketer who played for the ACT Comets in the Mercantile Mutual Cup.

== Biography ==
Swift comes from the town of Muswellbrook in the Hunter region of New South Wales. He played Sydney grade cricket with Hawkesbury before moving to Canberra in the 1997/98 season. A left-handed batsman, Swift captained Queanbeyan in the ACTCA competition for three seasons. He played a total of nine matches for the ACT Comets in Australia's domestic limited-overs tournament.

Since the early 2000s he has lived in England, where he moved to pursue a career in coaching. As a player, he has competed in the Bolton league and holds the record for the highest score in the Hamer Cup, an innings of 226 not out for Walkden against Farnworth in 2005.

A Level 4 qualified ECB coach, Swift worked with Lancashire from 2006 to 2011 as a team analyst and coach of the Colts.

When former Lancashire player Stuart Law was appointed coach of Bangladesh in 2011, one of his first appointments was Swift, who was recruited as the national side's fielding coach. After two years in Bangladesh, Swift took up a role at Sussex, where he coaches the second XI.
