= James Pattinson =

Australian cricketer (born 1990)

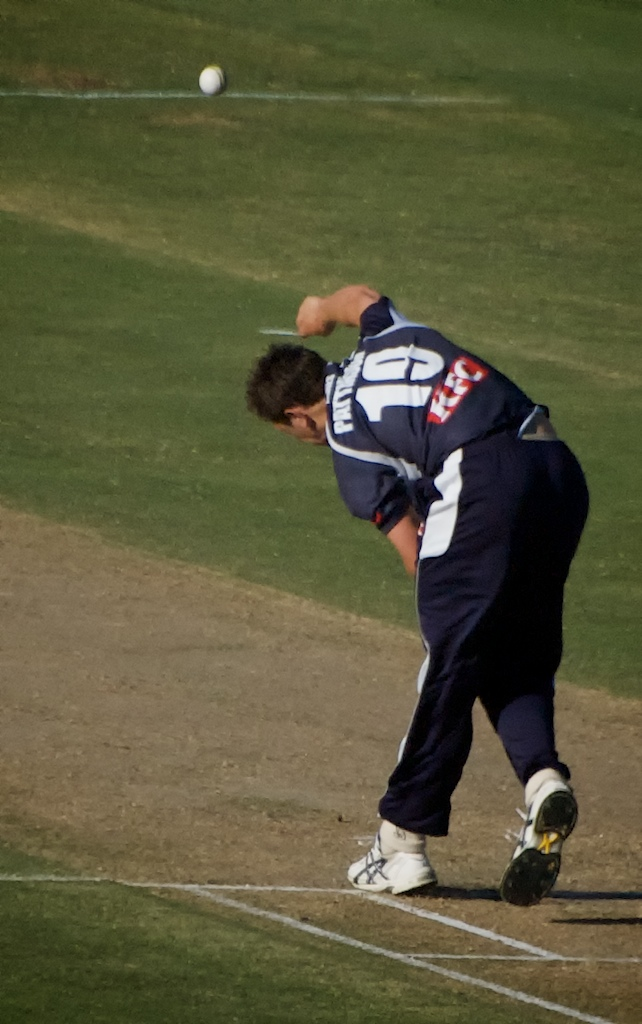
- Pattinson bowling at the WACA against Western Australia

Personal information
- Full name: James Lee Pattinson
- Born: 3 May 1990 (age 36); Melbourne, Victoria, Australia
- Height: 186 cm (6 ft 1 in)
- Batting: Left-handed
- Bowling: Right-arm fast-medium
- Role: Bowler
- Relatives: Darren Pattinson (brother)

International information
- National side: Australia (2011–2020)
- Test debut (cap 424): 1 December 2011 v New Zealand
- Last Test: 3 January 2020 v New Zealand
- ODI debut (cap 188): 13 April 2011 v Bangladesh
- Last ODI: 11 September 2015 v England
- ODI shirt no.: 19
- T20I debut (cap 52): 13 October 2011 v South Africa
- Last T20I: 30 March 2012 v West Indies
- T20I shirt no.: 19

Domestic team information
- Years: Team
- 2008/09–2021/2022: Victoria
- 2013: Rangpur Riders
- 2013/14–2016/17: Melbourne Renegades
- 2017–2022: Nottinghamshire
- 2018/19–2019/20: Brisbane Heat
- 2020: Mumbai Indians
- 2020/21: Melbourne Renegades

Career statistics
| Competition | Test | ODI | FC | LA |
|---|---|---|---|---|
| Matches | 21 | 15 | 89 | 68 |
| Runs scored | 417 | 42 | 1,998 | 407 |
| Batting average | 26.06 | 10.50 | 21.95 | 13.56 |
| 100s/50s | 0/0 | 0/0 | 0/5 | 0/1 |
| Top score | 47* | 13 | 89* | 54 |
| Balls bowled | 3,963 | 727 | 15,736 | 3,420 |
| Wickets | 81 | 16 | 350 | 100 |
| Bowling average | 26.33 | 42.56 | 23.52 | 30.11 |
| 5 wickets in innings | 4 | 0 | 13 | 2 |
| 10 wickets in match | 0 | 0 | 0 | 0 |
| Best bowling | 5/27 | 4/51 | 6/32 | 6/48 |
| Catches/stumpings | 6/– | 3/– | 24/– | 13/– |
- Source: ESPNcricinfo, 26 April 2022

James Lee Pattinson (born 3 May 1990) is an Australian cricketer. Pattinson is considered an aggressive fast bowler. After making his Test cricket debut in late 2011, he played Test and limited overs cricket for the Australia national cricket team, although his appearances were limited due to back injuries.

== Personal life ==
Pattinson's elder brother is Darren Pattinson, who played for England in one Test match. Pattinson grew up in Melbourne's outer suburbs and attended Haileybury (Melbourne). He made his first-class debut for the Victoria and subsequently won a contract with Nottinghamshire.

== Domestic career ==
Pattinson played for Dandenong Cricket Club in Victorian Premier Cricket and also played for Australia in the 2008 Under-19 World Cup in Malaysia.

On 23 December 2009, Pattinson set new best bowling in a List A innings record for Victoria, taking six wickets for the cost of 48 from his 10 overs.

Pattinson was bought by the Kolkata Knight Riders for the 2013 Indian Premier League. However he was ruled out of the tournament without playing in any of the matches due to non cricket related medical conditions.

On 2 September 2020, he was included in the Mumbai Indians team for the 2020 Indian Premier League as a replacement for Lasith Malinga who pulled out of the tournament citing personal reasons. Pattinson also eventually made his IPL debut in the 2020 season and became a regular member.

In March 2021, during the 2020–21 Sheffield Shield season, Pattinson took his 300th first-class wicket.

Pattinson was suspended for one match during the 2021-22 Sheffield Shield season after striking Daniel Hughes with the ball during his follow through.

== International career ==
Pattinson was named in the Australian ODI squad for its tour of Bangladesh in April 2011. He made his ODI debut in the third and final match of the series and took the wicket of Imrul Kayes. Pattinson joined the Australian Test squad for the 2011 tour to Sri Lanka, but did not play a Test.

Pattinson made his Test debut in the 2011/12 home series against New Zealand, in the first Test in Brisbane on 1 December 2011. He took 5 wickets for 27 runs in the second innings of his debut Test and helped Australia to a nine-wicket win, then took five wickets in the first innings of the second test, and was named Man of the Series, with fourteen wickets at an average of 14.00 across the two tests. He won another Man of the Match award in his next Test, the 2011 Boxing Day Test against India, with match figures of 6/108 and 55 runs. but he wasn't included in Australia's squad for the 2012 T20 World Cup.

He made a return to Australia squad after torn injury during 2012 home season. On his return he picked a 5-Wicket haul in 1st Test against India in March 2013 on a flat Chepauk surface dismissing Virender Sehwag, Murali Vijay, Cheteshwar Pujara, MS Dhoni and Ravindra Jadeja, Pattinson bowled at pace of over 145 km/h consistently in the match. This was first and only time an Australian fast bowler picked up a Five-Wicket haul at Chepauk. However, before the 3rd Test against India in March 2013, Australia dropped Pattinson, along with Shane Watson, Mitchell Johnson and Usman Khawaja following a breach of discipline. Michael Clarke, the captain, revealed that the extreme step had been taken as a result of repeated infractions which led to Watson flying back home and contemplating Test retirement. Former players reacted with astonishment at the harsh decision taken by the team management.

Pattinson later returned to the Australian Test team during the West Indies tour of Australia in December 2015. In his first Test match back, Pattinson achieved his fourth five wicket haul, taking 5/27, which equaled his previous best bowling figures. He also reverted to his old bowling action, which gives him more control and pace that touches close to 150 km/h, but at a risk of re-injuring his back.

On 20 April 2017, Pattinson was named in Australia's squad for the 2017 ICC Champions Trophy.

In April 2019, Pattinson was awarded a national contract by Cricket Australia for the 2019–20 season.

In July 2019, he was named in Australia's squad for the 2019 Ashes series in England. He played in the first Test – his first Test since February 2016 – and also in the third Test.

In October 2021 Pattinson announced his retirement from Test cricket ahead of the 2021–22 Ashes series. He had been suffering from a knee injury after a number of issues with other injuries helped to limit his Test appearances.
