= Lea Hansen (cricketer) =

Australian cricketer

Personal information
- Full name: Lea Kendall Hansen
- Born: 3 December 1972 (age 53); Kerang, Victoria
- Batting: Right-handed
- Bowling: Left-arm fast-medium
- Role: Bowler

Domestic team information
- Years: Team
- 1998/99–1999/00: ACT Comets

Career statistics
Competition	List A
Matches	12
Runs scored	2
Batting average	2.00
100s/50s	0/0
Top score	1*
Balls bowled	510
Wickets	16
Bowling average	20.12
5 wickets in innings	0
10 wickets in match	0
Best bowling	4/31
Catches/stumpings	5/–
- Source: CricketArchive, 10 April 2023

Lea Kendall Hansen (born 3 December 1972) is a former cricketer who played List A cricket for the ACT Comets in the Mercantile Mutual Cup.

== Biography ==
Hansen played club cricket in Melbourne for Footscray from 1993/94 to 1995/96. A left-arm fast bowler, he represented Victoria Country at the 1996/97 National Championships.

Before the 1997/98 season he made the decision to move north and play in the ACT, where he signed up with Queanbeyan. He also played Australian rules football with the Queanbeyan Tigers before giving the sport up due to injuries.

In 1998/99 he joined the ACT Comets, which were in their second season competing in Australia's domestic limited overs competition. He featured in all six matches the team played and won the Comets player of the season award, after taking 11 wickets at 15.63, which was the most for the Comets and equal fourth overall. Midway through the season he had the distinction of playing for the Prime Minister's XI against the touring England Ashes team.

Following his first season of domestic cricket, Hansen was a surprise selection in Australia A's touring side to play a series against India A in the United States He played in four of Australia A's five matches on the tour, which all had List A status and were held at Woodley Cricket Field in Los Angeles. In one match he dismissed V. V. S. Laxman for a duck and he claimed the wicket of Virender Sehwag in another.

Hansen remained with the Comets for the 1999/2000 season and featured in two matches. It was to be the Comets final season in the competition, but in 2000/01 he got an opportunity to return to his home state as a member of the Victorian squad. He was with the Victorian team for just one season, during which time his appearances were restricted to the Second XI.
