= Brad Haddin =

Australian cricketer (born 1977)

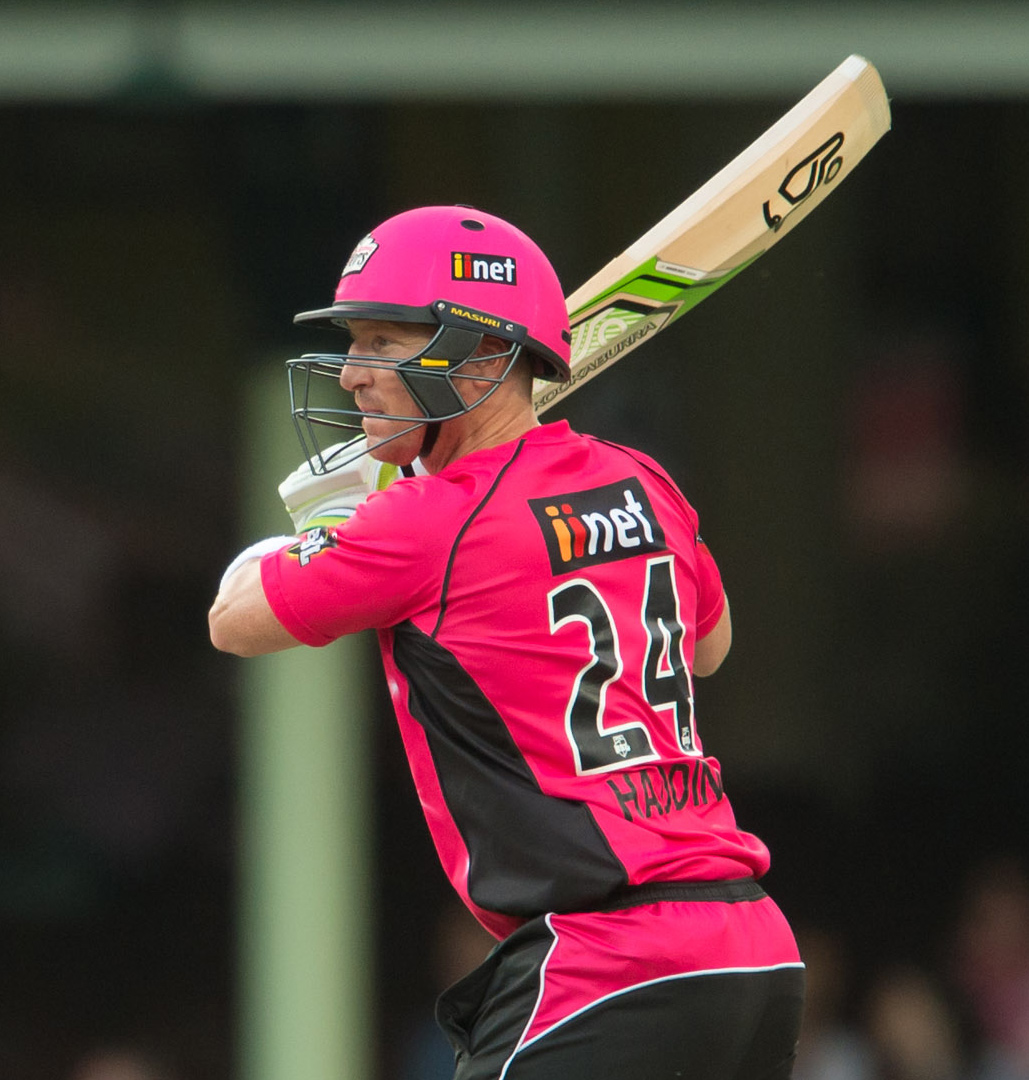
- Haddin playing for the Sixers in BBL06

Personal information
- Full name: Bradley James Haddin
- Born: 23 October 1977 (age 49); Cowra, New South Wales, Australia
- Nickname: BJ, Hadds
- Height: 177 cm (5 ft 10 in)
- Batting: Right-handed
- Role: Wicket-keeper-batter

International information
- National side: Australia (2001–2015)
- Test debut (cap 400): 22 May 2008 v West Indies
- Last Test: 12 July 2015 v England
- ODI debut (cap 144): 30 January 2001 v Zimbabwe
- Last ODI: 29 March 2015 v New Zealand
- ODI shirt no.: 57
- T20I debut (cap 16): 9 January 2006 v South Africa
- Last T20I: 5 October 2014 v Pakistan
- T20I shirt no.: 57

Domestic team information
- Years: Team
- 1997/98–1998/99: ACT Comets
- 1999/00–2014/15: New South Wales
- 2011: Kolkata Knight Riders
- 2011/12–2016/17: Sydney Sixers
- 2016–2017: Islamabad United

Career statistics
Competition	Test	ODI	FC	LA
Matches	66	126	184	235
Runs scored	3,266	3,122	9,932	6,503
Batting average	32.99	31.53	38.05	33.01
100s/50s	4/18	2/16	17/56	9/35
Top score	169	110	169	138*
Catches/stumpings	262/8	170/11	608/40	318/50
Medal record
Men's Cricket
Representing Australia
ICC Cricket World Cup
Winner	2007 West Indies
Winner	2015 Australia and New Zealand
- Source: ESPNcricinfo, 9 September 2015

Bradley James Haddin (born 23 October 1977), is an Australian former cricketer, vice-captain and coach who represented Australia in all three forms of international cricket. He played domestically for New South Wales as a right-handed batsman and wicket-keeper. Haddin was a member of the Australian World cup winning squad at both the 2007 Cricket World Cup the 2015 Cricket World Cup and played for the Sydney Sixers in the Big Bash League.

== Domestic and club career ==
Haddin's family moved to Queanbeyan in 1989 when he was 12 and he played for the Queanbeyan District Cricket Club Juniors to the age of 15 before joining the Australian National University Grade Cricket Club, representing 1st grade at age 16. Haddin was selected in the first ever Mercantile Mutual Cup season of 1997–98 for the ACT Comets, with whom he began his professional cricketing career. In the 1999–2000 season, he began playing for the New South Wales Blues to pursue further cricketing opportunities. Since then, he has produced several memorable batting innings, including a top score of 133 against Victoria. Haddin was signed by Chennai Super Kings in the 2010 IPL. In the 2011 Indian Premier League season, Haddin was contracted by Kolkata Knight Riders for US$325,000.

On 26 September 2012, Haddin scored a century in a Sheffield Shield match against Tasmania at the Bankstown Oval, his first since his century in the first Ashes test against England in November 2010.

In November 2015 Haddin made his return to the ACT Comets for the first time since the 1998–99 season, where he played a Futures League match and made a century in his first innings, ending on 104 off 100 balls, making him only the sixth player to score a century on debut.

Haddin played for Islamabad United in the Pakistan Super League held in the UAE in February 2016. He was retained by United's team management for 2nd season.

== International career ==
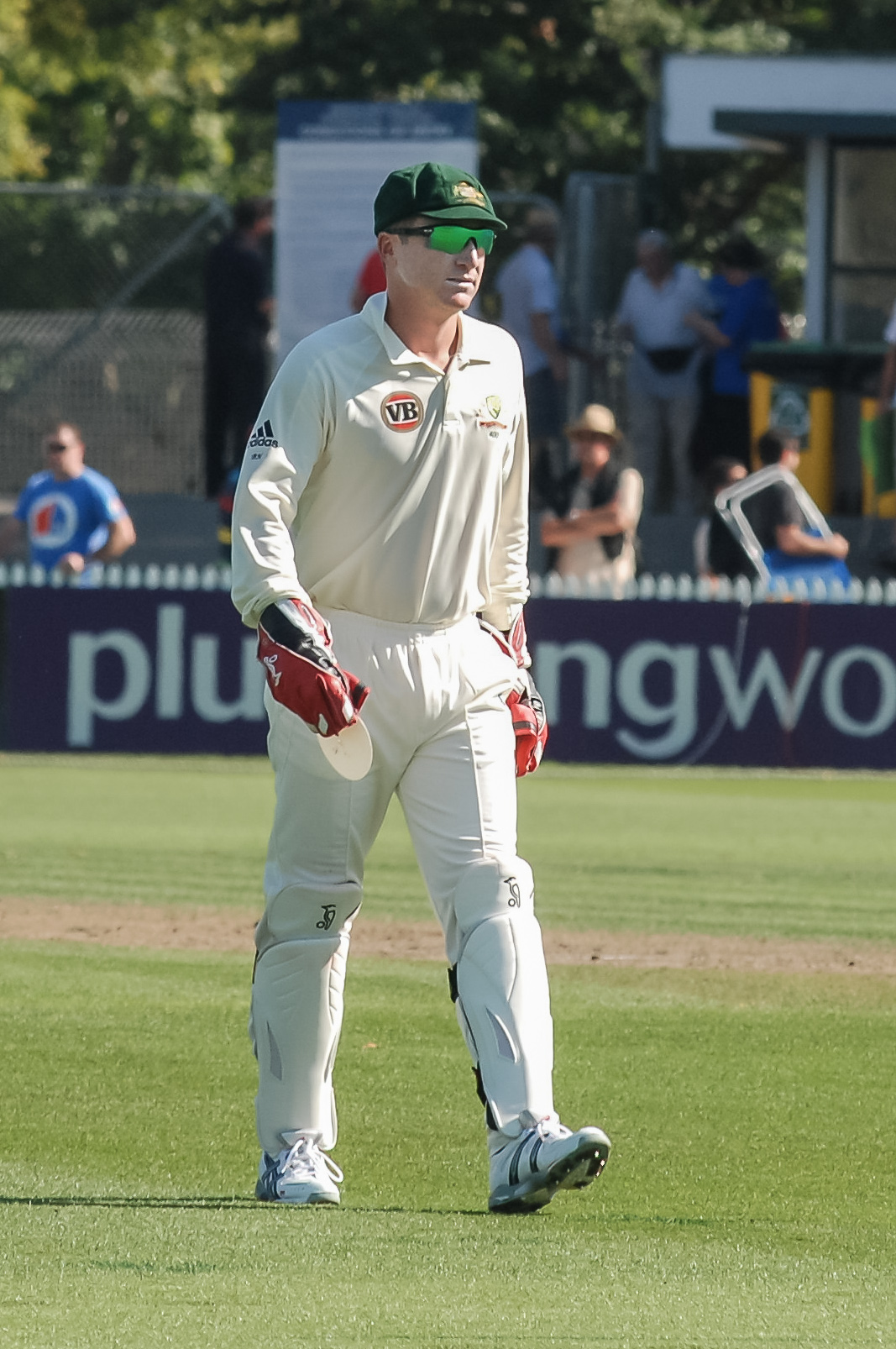
Haddin playing for Australia in 2009.

In September 2003, Haddin replaced Simon Katich as captain of New South Wales, while Katich was on international duty, and he has since been acting-captain on numerous occasions. He has also captained Australia A. For most of his career Haddin was Australia A wicketkeeper but was drafted into the full squad as back-up wicketkeeper in case Adam Gilchrist was injured or rested. He made his international debut in a one-day international on 30 January 2001 against Zimbabwe in Hobart. He made one stumping and made 13 runs. He was demoted from second choice wicket keeper for Australia in 2001 by Wade Seccombe and later Ryan Campbell, but reclaimed this position in late 2004. He was called up as part of Australia's 2005 Ashes squad but was not used throughout the series.

On 18 September 2006, playing against West Indies at Kuala Lumpur in the DLF Cup, Haddin and Australian captain Mike Hussey put on 165, which at that time was a world-record stand for the sixth wicket in ODIs. After Gilchrist's retirement in early 2008, Haddin finally made his Test debut on 22 May against the West Indies at Kingston, Jamaica, becoming Australia's 400th Test cricketer.

Haddin was involved in a controversy relating to the dismissal of Neil Broom in an ODI between Australia and New Zealand in Perth in February 2009. Broom was given out bowled but replays clearly showed that Haddin's gloves had disturbed the bails. New Zealand captain Daniel Vettori expressed his dissatisfaction with Haddin's actions in not calling Broom back to the wicket. His comment led to an angry retort from Australian captain Ricky Ponting. Ponting defended his teammate saying that Haddin was convinced the ball hit the stumps. On 15 February 2009, Haddin became acting Australian captain for the Twenty20 against New Zealand after Ricky Ponting was rested and Michael Clarke was injured.

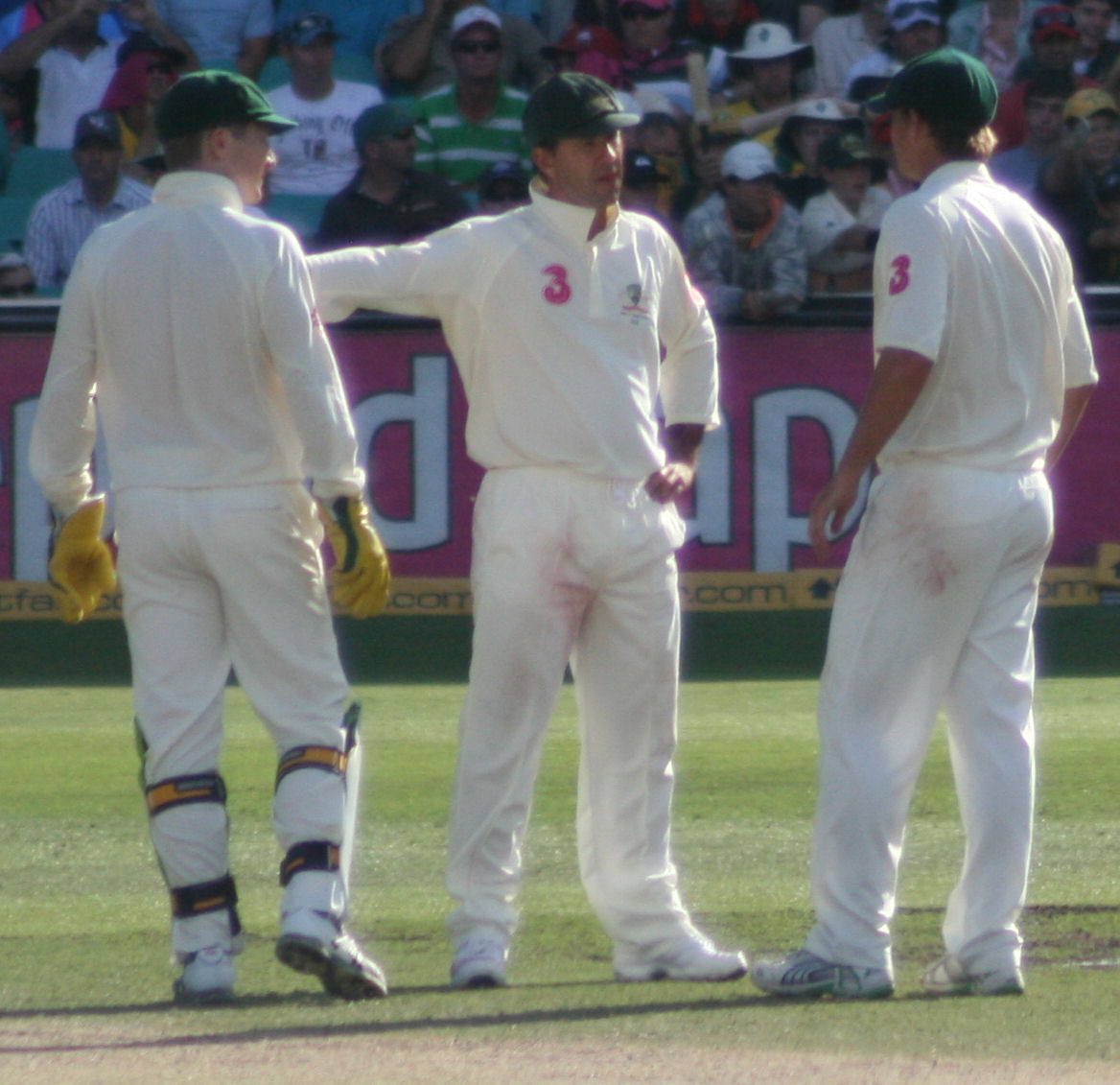
Haddin (left) with Ricky Ponting (centre) and Nathan Hauritz (right) in the Third and final Test against South Africa in Sydney, January 2009

On 9 March 2010, in the third match of the 2009–10 Chappell-Hadlee One Day International series against New Zealand, Haddin scored his second ODI hundred, hitting 110 off 121 balls opening the Australian innings. He was ruled out of the 2010 ODI series in England due to an elbow injury, which he claims flared up when he smashed that century against New Zealand in March.

On 27 November 2010, in the opening match of The Ashes series 2010–11 at the Gabba, Brisbane, Haddin scored 136, his third test hundred, in a valuable innings that helped Australia to a commanding first innings lead. He went on in the series to collect 360 runs at an average of 45.00. He was dropped for Australia's Twenty20 series against England in January 2011 in favour of Tim Paine, a decision which Haddin said had left him "confused". He retired from T20 internationals in September 2011, to focus on ODIs and Tests. He was axed from the ODI team in January 2012 after a poor 2011 home season. At this point, he remained the first choice wicket-keeper for Australia in Tests, but the emergence of Matthew Wade threatened his place. Inevitably, in October 2012, Haddin was axed from the Test team, making way for Wade, although the national selector John Inverarity stated that Haddin remained a "player of significant interest".

Haddin was recalled to the Australia squad for the 2013 Ashes series, was named as vice-captain and selected as wicketkeeper for the first test. During the series, Haddin set a new record for the most dismissals by a wicketkeeper in a Test series with 29 dismissals, all caught. Haddin was a member of the team which regained Ashes at Perth after four years. He famously said after the win "We've got them back!"

Brad Haddin's record as captain
	Matches	Won	Lost	Drawn	Tied	No result	Win %
Twenty20	2	1	1	0	0	–	50.00 %
Date last Updated:		2 September 2015					

During 2013–14 Ashes series, Haddin became only the second wicket-keeper to hit five half-centuries in a Test series. His total of 493 runs broke the record for most runs in a series by an Australian wicket-keeper. Haddin also scored 118 during the first innings of the Adelaide test, combining in a 200 run partnership with Michael Clarke.

On 15 December 2014, with Cricket Australia pursuing "a longer-term view" in regards to the leadership of the Test Team, a 37-year-old Haddin was replaced permanently as vice-captain by Steve Smith.

=== Retirement ===
Haddin retired from ODI cricket in May 2015 after the 2015 Cricket World Cup as part of the winning team.

Haddin's test career was swiftly ended by head coach Lehmann in July during the 2015 Ashes series, after missing the second Test due to his ill daughter. His replacement Peter Nevill was reported as batting and keeping well in his debut Test. Former Australian wicket-keeper Ian Healy called the decision a "harsh call".

He wrote an autobiography entitled My Family Keeper (2013) about his life and his daughter's fight with a form of cancer called neuroblastoma.

He became the ambassador for his home ground, Sydney Cricket Ground (SCG) along with Steve Smith after his retirement. Haddin announced his retirement from international and first class cricket with New South Wales on 9 September 2015. Inducted into ACT Sport Hall of Fame in 2024.

== Coaching career ==
Haddin was appointed fielding coach for the Australia national cricket team in 2018.

Haddin was appointed as assistant coach for Sunrisers Hyderabad in 2019, working with head coach Trevor Bayliss. In October 2022, Haddin was appointed assistant coach at Punjab Kings, again linking up with Bayliss.
