= Jono Dean =

Australian cricketer (born 1984)

Personal information
- Full name: Jonathon Robert Dean
- Born: 23 June 1984 (age 42); Bathurst, New South Wales, Australia
- Batting: Right-handed
- Bowling: Right-arm off break
- Role: Batsman

Domestic team information
- Years: Team
- 2007/08–2017/18: ACT Comets
- 2013/14–2017/18: Adelaide Strikers

Career statistics
Competition	Twenty20
Matches	22
Runs scored	317
Batting average	19.81
100s/50s	0/1
Top score	54*
Catches/stumpings	5/–
- Source: ESPNcricinfo, 6 February 2018

Jonathon Robert Dean (born 23 June 1984 in Bathurst, New South Wales) is an Australian former cricketer and former head coach of the ACT Meteors. He was a right-handed batsman.

== Cricket career ==
=== Early career ===
Having been raised in his home town of Bathurst, Dean later lived in Sydney, where he played grade cricket for St George and represented the state of New South Wales at under-19 level. Despite this, he stopped playing cricket for several years before moving to Canberra when he was 23. In Canberra, after a chance meeting with ACT Comets player Adam Heading in a pub, he got back into cricket with Queanbeyan.

Dean became captain of the Canberra Comets, with whom he began his professional cricketing career. In the 2011–12 and 2012–13 seasons he was in squads with the Perth Scorchers and Melbourne Renegades respectively, both teams that play in the Australian national Twenty20 competition the Big Bash League, but he did not play for either side.

Dean was selected in the Prime Minister's XI game against the West Indies first at Manuka Oval in January 2013. Opening, he scored 51 runs off 38 balls. Four days later he scored 300 not out in a match for Queanbeyan, hitting 17 sixes and 21 fours in his innings. This was the second-highest grade cricket score of all time in the Australian Capital Territory. After this he started to attract more attention from professional cricket teams.

=== Adelaide Strikers (2013–2018) ===
Dean was signed by the Adelaide Strikers for BBL|03. He made his Twenty20 debut for the Strikers on 22 December 2013, against the Hobart Hurricanes, but he did not bat or bowl during the match, which was ended after just six overs of play. Despite his minimal impact on debut, he made a big enough impression on the Strikers during the season that they were interested in giving him another contract. He entered an agreement with the South Australian Cricket Association (SACA) before the signing window opened, along with Brad Hodge and Kieron Pollard, for which SACA were fined $50,000. Despite this hiccup Dean still signed a two-year contract with the Strikers.

Dean started to become an important part of the Strikers' squad in BBL|04. In the fifth match of his career he scored his maiden half-century, playing against the Hobart Hurricanes on New Year's Eve, 2014. Dean was originally not in the Strikers' team to play, but was brought in as a late replacement when Brad Hodge was hit by a cricket ball while warming up for the game. After breaking his bat early in the innings trying to hit a cover drive off of Timm van der Gugten's bowling, Dean accelerated to lead the Strikers to an easy victory, scoring 54 runs from 35 deliveries. He hit four of his last six deliveries for six, bringing up both his half-century and the win with the final six. Despite Dean's improving form, he did not play in the first six matches of BBL|05, but he did make an important 48 runs against the Melbourne Renegades in a must-win game, and was rewarded with another two-year contract.

Dean started BBL|06 poorly. In both of his first two matches he scored ducks, which put him under a lot of pressure the next time he batted against the Melbourne Stars. He referred to this innings as the most pressure he had ever been under. The most important innings of his season came later on against the Melbourne Renegades, with the Strikers still needing to score more runs to win the match. He scored 21 runs before being dismissed in the final over, and the Strikers lost by just 6 runs.

Due to shoulder issues, poor form and a deep batting lineup for the Strikers, Dean only played four of the Strikers' ten regular season matches in BBL|07 and his contract was set to expire at the end of the season. In those four matches he averaged just 16 runs and had a strike-rate of 84.21, putting pressure on himself to perform in the finals in order to get a contract extension. He was crucial in the Strikers' semi-final win over the Melbourne Renegades, which secured them a home final. He scored 19 runs off of 8 balls and took an important catch. Due to Adelaide's dominance, particularly that of Jake Weatherald, Dean wasn't required to bat in the final but was still part of the team that won the tournament.

== Grade cricket ==
After leaving Bathurst, Dean played for the St George Cricket Club in Sydney before playing for Queanbeyan District Cricket Club in the ACT Cricket Competition and has been a prolific run scorer scoring over 5000 runs in grade cricket. On 2 February 2013 Dean scored an unbeaten 300 runs in a single day for Queanbeyan against Ginninderra in a Douglas Cup Match. The innings included 17 sixes and 21 fours and was the second highest individual innings in ACT first-grade cricket history. On 2 November 2013 Jono Dean scored 234 and his brother Blake Dean 69 in a total of 6-437 declared against Weston Creek Molonglo. In the 2014 off season, Jono made the move to Weston Creek Molongo Cricket Club where he enjoyed a successful season for the club as one of the highest run scorers (1180 runs across all formats) in the first grade competition. Jono has been named captain for the 2015–16 season for Weston Creek. In October 2015, Jono became the first ACT cricket player to reach 1000 career runs in Cricket ACT's Twenty20 competition. Since moved to Weston Creek Molonglo he has scored over a thousand runs at the club.

== Player profile ==
Dean was a right-handed batsman and occasionally bowls right-arm off break deliveries, though he did not bowl at Twenty20 level. His batting style is not conventionally appreciated in longer forms of cricket, and as a result he did not make a first-class appearance or earn a contract with any state associations. However, with the growth of Twenty20 cricket, his ability to score runs quickly enabled him to make a mark in the Big Bash League.

== Personal life ==
Dean worked for the Australian Department of Agriculture in Canberra, and takes leave from his work every summer in order to play for the Strikers in Adelaide.
