= Mark Higgs (cricketer) =

Australian cricketer

Personal information
- Full name: Mark Anthony Higgs
- Born: 30 June 1976 (age 50); Queanbeyan, New South Wales
- Batting: Left-handed
- Bowling: Slow left-arm wrist-spin Slow left-arm orthodox
- Role: All-rounder

Domestic team information
- Years: Team
- 1997-1998: Australian Capital Territory
- 1999-2002: New South Wales
- 2002-2005: South Australia
- 2003: Lincolnshire
- 2013: Hobart Hurricanes

Career statistics
Competition	FC	LA	T20
Matches	38	65	1
Runs scored	1,915	1328	–
Batting average	32.45	24.14	–
100s/50s	3/9	0/5	–
Top score	181*	77	–
Balls bowled	3,147	1,232	12
Wickets	31	32	0
Bowling average	56.16	35.34	–
5 wickets in innings	0	0	–
10 wickets in match	0	0	–
Best bowling	4/25	4/15	–
Catches/stumpings	21/–	25/–	0/–
- Source: CricketArchive

Mark Anthony Higgs (born 30 June 1976) is an Australian first-class cricketer, who played for South Australia, New South Wales and the ACT Comets. He was an allrounder, who bowled both slow left-arm orthodox and slow left-arm wrist-spin. With the bat he was an aggressive left-handed middle order batsman.

Before moving to NSW in 1998–99, Higgs represented the Canberra Comets in one day domestic cricket. The side did not play first class cricket, so a move to the Blues allowed him to expand his horizons. He had played in Canberra's first ever season in Australian domestic cricket, smashing 36 and taking three wickets on his debut in 1997–98.

He had trouble holding onto his place in the side in NSW, but, after a strong finish to the 1999–2000 season, was named as a surprise replacement for the injured Shane Warne in the 2000 ICC KnockOut Trophy in Kenya. Despite playing in a warm up match, he did not play an ODI.

In 2000–01, he had his best season with the highlight being an unbeaten 181 in a victory over Queensland. He also impressed with 4 for 15 in a one-day game against Western Australia.

Higgs moved interstate again in 2002–03, this time to South Australia. He made a century on debut but struggled from there on in.

Mark has 2 Kids Jack and Lily with his wife Maree

From 2006 to 2009, Higgs captained the Queanbeyan District Cricket Club.
