= Cricket ACT =

Cricket governing body in the Australian Capital Territory

- Sport: Cricket
- Jurisdiction: Regional
- Abbreviation: (CACT)
- Founded: 1922
- Affiliation: Cricket Australia
- President: Greg Boorer
- CEO: Olivia Thornton
- (founded): Federal Territory Cricket Association (1922); Federal Capital Territory Cricket Association (1928); Australian Capital Territory Cricket Association (1940)

Official website
- cricketact.com.au
- (Australian Capital Territory)

Cricket ACT is the governing body of cricket in the Australian Capital Territory (ACT). In 1922, the Federal Territory Cricket Association (FTCA) was established to govern the sport of cricket in the then Federal Capital Territory, which had been formed from part of New South Wales in 1911, and which became the Australian Capital Territory in 1938. In 1928, the FTCA was renamed as the Federal Capital Territory Cricket Association.

== See also ==
- Sport in the Australian Capital Territory
