= ACT Comets =

Cricket team

Australian Capital Territory (ACT Comets)
- One Day name: ACT Comets

Personnel
- Captain: Jono Dean

Team information
- Founded: 1928
- Home ground: Manuka Oval
- Capacity: 15,000

History
- Futures League wins: 1
- Official website: ACT Comets
First-class
One-day

The ACT Comets (also known as the Canberra Comets) are a cricket team that represent the Australian Capital Territory. The Comets are the premier team of the Cricket ACT who are affiliated with Cricket Australia.

== In the Domestic One Day Competition ==
The ACT Comets were participants in the Australian domestic limited-overs Mercantile Mutual Cup competition. They did not, however, field a team in the four-day Sheffield Shield competition. Their Mercantile Mutual Cup involvement lasted from the 1997–98 season to the 1999–2000 season. It was found that there was insufficient local support at that time to be financially viable in the first-class and list-A competitions. Former Australian Test bowler Merv Hughes was brought out of retirement to help ACT, as was former Test batsman Mike Veletta.

== ACT and Canberra region players ==
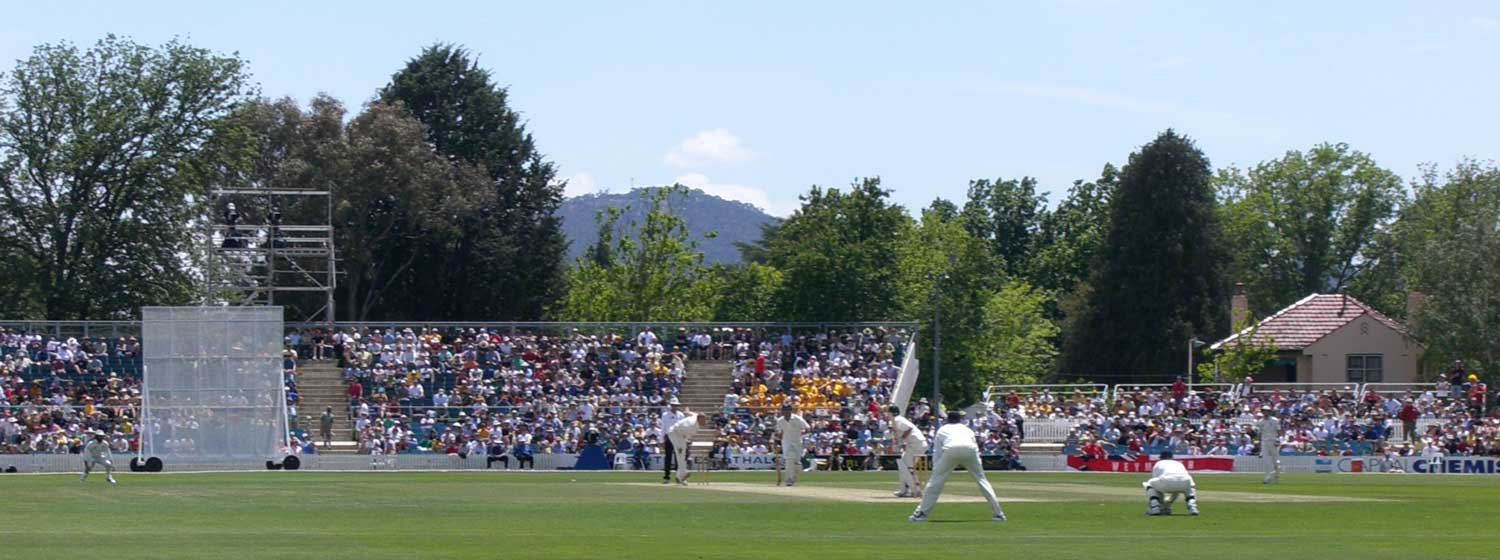
Manuka Oval, home of the ACT Comets during a Prime Minister's XI game.

Australian internationals Brad Haddin and Nathan Lyon played for the Comets. Former Australian Test batsman Michael Bevan was born in Canberra and played cricket with the Weston Creek club, but did not play for the Comets.

Police Magistrate A. T. Faunce was instrumental in bringing cricket to the Canberra-Queanbeyan region in the 1830s and died while playing the game at the Queanbeyan Market reserve (now Queen Elizabeth Park). There have been 25 players to play 50 or more games for the ACT. Four players have reached 100, while Peter Solway is the only to have reached 150 games. The highest individual scores in ACT grade cricket have been: 339 – PJ Solway (1989/90), 300 – JR Dean (2012/13), 246 – CE Hincksman (1926/27), 238 – L Lees (1932/33), 220 – C Brown (2008/9), 215 – L Lees (1933/34), 211 – PJ Solway (1990/91), 207- NH Fairbrother (1988/89), 205 – JN Williams (1988/89), 200 – MJ Dawn (2001/02), 200- C Brown (2008/09) Owen Chivers 204* and Michael Spaseski 221 in same match 2013/14 .

== In Second XI ==
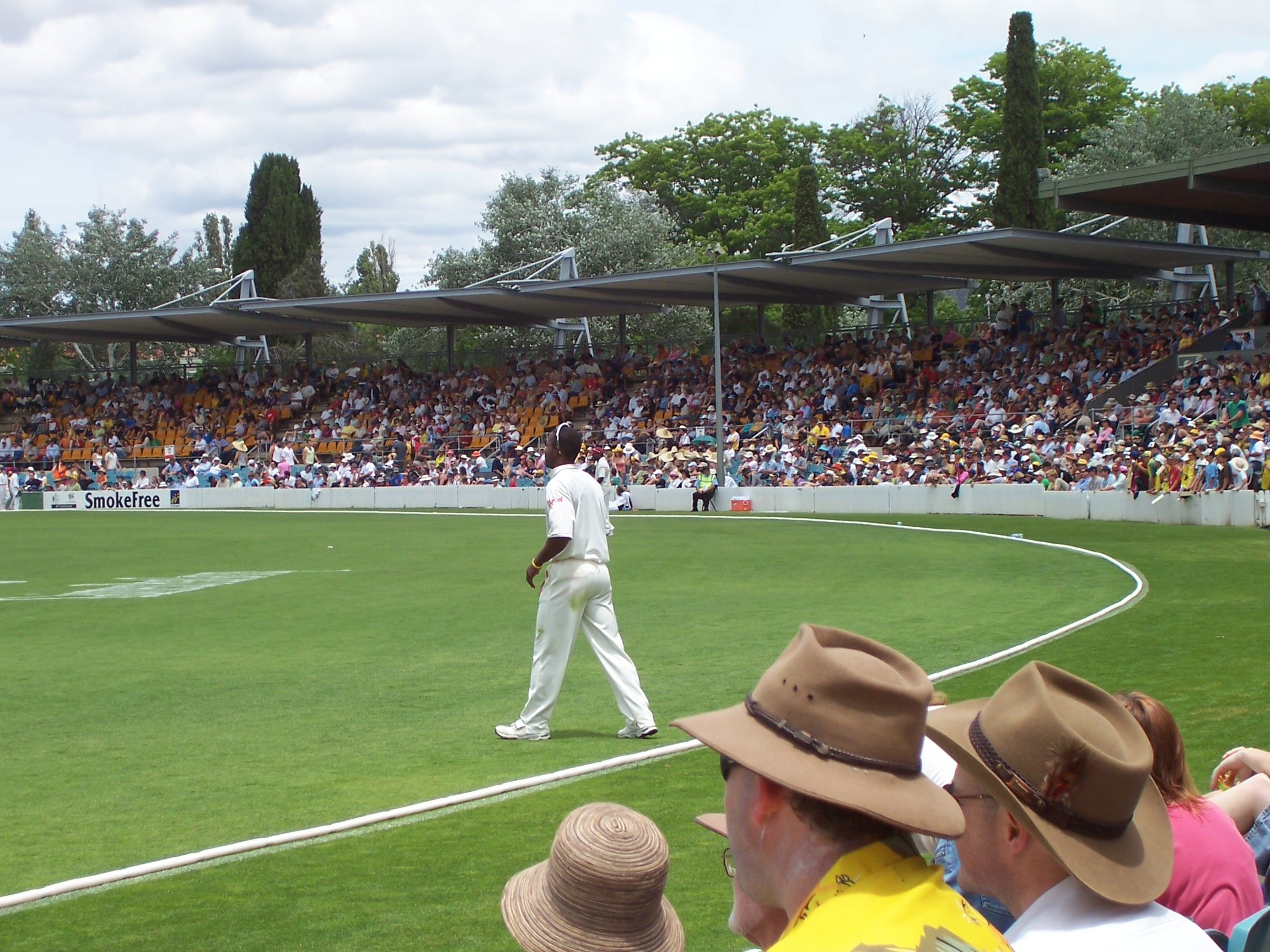
Cricket at Manuka Oval, home of the ACT Comets.

Today, the team represents ACT in the lower-level Second XI competition, a reserve grade to the Sheffield Shield. The Comets finished the 2005–06 season in fourth place with two outright wins. The Comets took out their first ever title in the 2010–11 season.
