= Sri Lanka A cricket team in Australia in 2025 =

International cricket tour

	Australia A	Sri Lanka A
- Dates: 4 – 25 July 2025
Captains	Jason Sangha (First-class); Matt Renshaw (List A)	Pasindu Sooriyabandara (First-class); Lahiru Udara (List A)

FC series
- Result: 2-match series drawn 0–0
Most runs	Jake Weatherald (237)	Nuwanidu Fernando (240)
Most wickets	Liam Scott (4); Henry Thornton (4); Zanden Jeh (4)	Sonal Dinusha (4); Nishan Peiris (4)

LA series
- Result: Australia A won the 3-match series 2–1
Most runs	Matt Renshaw (248)	Nuwanidu Fernando (122)
Most wickets	Sam Elliott (7)	Pramod Madushan (5)

The Sri Lanka A cricket team toured Australia in July 2025 to play against the Australia A cricket team. The tour consisted of two first-class matches and three List A cricket matches. In May 2025, Cricket Australia (CA) confirmed the fixtures for the tour.

Ahead of the series, former Test captain of the Australia men's cricket team, Tim Paine was appointed as the head coach of Australia A.

== Squads ==
Australia A		Sri Lanka A	
First-class	List A	First-class	List A
Jason Sangha (c); Zanden Jeh; Campbell Kellaway; Nathan McSweeney; Kurtis Patterson; Oliver Peake; Mitchell Perry; Josh Philippe (wk); Liam Scott; Louis Smith; Henry Thornton; Jake Weatherald	Matt Renshaw (c); Sam Elliott; Matthew Gilkes; Bryce Jackson; Zanden Jeh; Campbell Kellaway; Nathan McSweeney; Jack Nisbet; Oliver Peake; Josh Philippe (wk); Jason Sangha; Liam Scott; Billy Stanlake; Henry Thornton	Pasindu Sooriyabandara (c); Sonal Dinusha; Shiran Fernando; Nuwanidu Fernando; Sohan de Livera; Asanka Manoj; Pramod Madushan; Nishan Peiris; Vishad Randika; Ravindu Rasantha; Pavan Rathnayake; Wanuja Sahan; Mohamed Shiraz; Lahiru Udara; Isitha Wijesundara	Lahiru Udara (c, wk); Sahan Arachchige; Lasith Croospulle; Sonal Dinusha; Nuwanidu Fernando; Shiran Fernando; Dushan Hemantha; Pramod Madushan; Kamil Mishara; Pavan Rathnayake; Mohamed Shiraz; Wanuja Sahan; Pasindu Sooriyabandara; Chamindu Wickramasinghe; Isitha Wijesundara

On 20 June 2025, Australia A added Zanden Jeh.

== List A series ==
=== 1st Unofficial ODI ===
4 July 2025
10:00
Scorecard

Australia A 4/332 (50 overs)	v	Sri Lanka A 134 (35.4 overs)
Nathan McSweeney 85* (63); Dushan Hemantha 1/29 (5 overs)		Kamil Mishara 65 (79); Sam Elliott 5/14 (9 overs)

Australia A won by 198 runs
Marrara Oval, Darwin
Umpires: Shawn Craig (Aus) and Donovan Koch (Aus)

- Sri Lanka A won the toss and elected to field.
- Oliver Peake (Australia A) made his List A debut.

=== 2nd Unofficial ODI ===
6 July 2025
10:00
Scorecard

Sri Lanka A 7/294 (50 overs)	v	Australia A 243 (41.1 overs)
Nuwanidu Fernando 82 (90); Sam Elliott 2/30 (3 overs)		Matt Renshaw 106 (75); Pramod Madushan 4/37 (8.1 overs)

Sri Lanka A won by 51 runs
Marrara Oval, Darwin
Umpires: Shawn Craig (Aus) and Phillip Gillespie (Aus)

- Australia A won the toss and elected to field.

=== 3rd Unofficial ODI ===
9 July 2025
10:00
Scorecard

Sri Lanka A 9/213 (50 overs)	v	Australia A 3/215 (32.3 overs)
Sahan Arachchige 47 (65); Bryce Jackson 2/25 (8 overs)		Jason Sangha 79* (76); Isitha Wijesundara 1/35 (6 overs)

Australia A won by 7 wickets
Marrara Oval, Darwin
Umpires: Phillip Gillespie (Aus) and Donovan Koch (Aus)

- Sri Lanka A won the toss and elected to bat.
- Zanden Jeh (Australia A) made his List A debut.

== First-class series ==
=== 1st Unofficial Test ===
13–16 July 2025
Scorecard

Sri Lanka A	v	Australia A
272 (82 overs); Sonal Dinusha 105* (148); Liam Scott 2/27 (14 overs)		486 (161.4 overs); Nathan McSweeney 94 (220); Sonal Dinusha 4/97 (33 overs)
3/280 (81 overs); Nuwanidu Fernando 104* (218); Liam Scott 1/10 (10 overs)

Match drawn
Marrara Oval, Darwin
Umpires: Shawn Craig (Aus) and Donovan Koch (Aus)

- Australia A won the toss and elected to field.
- Zanden Jeh and Louis Smith (Australia A) both made their first-class debuts.

=== 2nd Unofficial Test ===
20–23 July 2025
Scorecard

Sri Lanka A	v	Australia A
6/485d (157 overs); Pawan Rathnayake 122 (223); Zanden Jeh 3/132 (43 overs)		4/558 (161 overs); Jason Sangha 202* (379); Nishan Peiris 2/144 (48 overs)

Match drawn
Marrara Oval, Darwin
Umpires: Phillip Gillespie (Aus) and Sam Nogajski (Aus)

- Australia A won the toss and elected to field.
- Jake Weatherald (Australia A) scored his 5,000th run in first-class cricket.
- Jason Sangha (Australia A) scored maiden double century in first-class cricket.
