= Australia A cricket team in England in 2019 =

Cricket tournament

- Dates: 20 June – 17 July 2019

The Australia A cricket team toured England to play 5 List A matches against several County Clubs and First-class matches against Sussex and the England Lions cricket team, all played in June and July 2019.

== Squads ==
In April 2019, Australia A announced two 14-man touring parties. Ahead of the First-class matches, Joe Burns added to the squad.

Australia A squads
List A	First-class
Travis Head (c); Josh Hazlewood (vc); Mitchell Marsh (vc); Matthew Wade; Will Pucovski; Peter Handscomb; Ashton Turner; D'Arcy Short; Kurtis Patterson; Ashton Agar; Michael Neser; James Pattinson; Kane Richardson; Sean Abbott	Tim Paine (c); Josh Hazlewood (vc); Travis Head (vc); Matthew Wade; Will Pucovski; Peter Handscomb; Marcus Harris; Mitchell Marsh; Kurtis Patterson; Jon Holland; Michael Neser; James Pattinson; Jackson Bird; Chris Tremain; Joe Burns

== List A matches ==
=== Northamptonshire vs Australia A ===
20 June 2019
13:00 (D/N)
Scorecard

Northamptonshire; 262/9 (50 overs)	v	Australia A 265/4 (36 overs)
Alex Wakely 53 (55); Ashton Agar 3/55 (10 overs)		Matthew Wade 117 (67); Tom Sole 2/50 (6 overs)

Australia A won by 6 wickets
County Ground, Northampton
Umpires: Mike Burns (Eng) and Jeremy Lloyds (Eng)

- Northamptonshire won the toss and elected to bat.

=== Derbyshire vs Australia A ===
23 June 2019
11:00
Scorecard

Derbyshire; 283/9 (50 overs)	v	Australia A 287/3 (35.2 overs)
Leus du Plooy 115 (120); Andrew Tye 6/65 (10 overs)		Matthew Wade 155 (71); James Taylor 2/66 (7 overs)

Australia A won by 7 wickets
County Ground, Derby
Umpires: Ian Ramage (Sco) and David Millns (Eng)

- Australia A won the toss and elected to field.
- James Taylor (Derbyshire) made his List A debut.

=== Worcestershire vs Australia A ===
25 June 2019
11:00
Scorecard

Worcestershire	v	Australia A

Match abandoned
Chester Road North Ground, Kidderminster
Umpires: Peter Hartley (Eng) and Ian Blackwell (Eng)

- No toss.
- No play was possible due to rain.

=== Gloucestershire vs Australia A ===
30 June 2019
11:00
Scorecard

Gloucestershire; 246/8 (50 overs)	v	Australia A 247/5 (42.1 overs)
James Bracey 83 (69); Mitchell Marsh 3/43 (9 overs)		Peter Handscomb 57 (54); Chris Liddle 3/59 (9 overs)

Australia A won by 5 wickets
County Ground, Bristol
Umpires: James Middlebrook (Eng) and Neil Mallender (Eng)

- Australia A won the toss and elected to field.
- Ben Charlesworth, Tom Price and Gregory Willows (Gloucestershire) all made their List A debuts.

=== Gloucestershire vs Australia A ===
2 July 2019
11:00
Scorecard

Australia A 353/3 (50 overs)	v	Gloucestershire; 344/7 (50 overs)
Travis Head 138 (120); Ryan Higgins 2/84 (10 overs)		James Bracey 71 (65); Sean Abbott 4/52 (10 overs)

Australia A won by 9 runs
County Ground, Bristol
Umpires: Neil Mallender (Eng) and Rob Bailey (Eng)

- Australia A won the toss and elected to bat.
- Josh Shaw (Gloucestershire) made his List A debut.

== First-class matches ==
=== Sussex vs Australia A ===
7–10 July 2019
Scorecard

Sussex	v	Australia A
263 (70.5 overs); Delray Rawlins 69 (103); James Pattinson 4/60 (20 overs)		373 (96.1 overs); Joe Burns 133 (241); Abidine Sakande 3/89 (24 overs)
120 (40.4 overs); Aneesh Kapil 33* (49); Jon Holland 3/30 (10 overs)		12/0 (1 over); Marcus Harris 12* (6)

Australia A won by 10 wickets
Arundel Castle Cricket Ground, Arundel
Umpires: Peter Hartley (Eng) and Hassan Adnan (Eng)

- Sussex won the toss and elected to bat.

=== Unofficial Test : England Lions vs Australia A ===
14–17 July 2019
Scorecard

Australia A	v	England Lions
397 (99.5 overs); Travis Head 139* (214); Sam Curran 6/95 (23 overs)		267 (90.1 overs); Dom Sibley 74 (191); Chris Tremain 4/70 (17.1 overs)
252/8d (77.5 overs); Marcus Harris 50 (115); Jack Leach 5/109 (28.5 overs)		267/5 (84 overs); Sam Curran 56* (81); Michael Neser 3/38 (16 overs)

Match drawn
St Lawrence Ground, Canterbury
Umpires: Jeff Evans (Eng) and Chris Watts (Eng)

- England Lions won the toss and elected to field.
