= Zanden Jeh =

Australian cricketer

Personal information
- Born: 28 June 2003 (age 23); Brisbane, Australia
- Batting: Left-handed
- Bowling: Left arm off break
- Relatives: Michael Jeh (father)

Domestic team information
- Years: Team
- 2025/26: Queensland

Career statistics
Competition	First-class	List A
Matches	2	1
Runs scored	27	–
Batting average	27.00	–
100s/50s	0/0	–
Top score	27	–
Balls bowled	450	42
Wickets	4	1
Bowling average	71.75	27.00
5 wickets in innings	0	0
10 wickets in match	0	0
Best bowling	3/132	1/27
Catches/stumpings	1/–	0/–
- Source: ESPNcricinfo, 28 July 2025

Zanden Jeh (born 28 June 2003) is an Australian cricketer. He is a left handed batsman and left arm off-spin bowler. He made his first-class cricket debut for Australia A on 13 July 2025 against Sri Lanka A.

== Career ==
From Brisbane, Jeh played in the state second XI competition during the 2024–25 season for Queensland with his efforts including a five-wicket haul and the dismissal of Glenn Maxwell. Jeh was called up to the Australia A squad in June 2025, despite being yet to make a professional cricket debut, as Australia valued left arm orthodox spin for future tours of Asia. He made his List A debut and first-class debut for Australia A against Sri Lanka A in July 2025.

Following his appearances for Australia A, Jeh was automatically upgraded to a full contract with Queensland for the 2025–26 season. Jeh was released by Queensland at the end of the season, having not played a match.

== Personal life ==
Of Sri Lankan descent, his father Michael Jeh was also a first-class cricketer from Sri Lanka who played in England before setting in Australia. He has two younger siblings, Sierra and Saxon.
