= South Africa A Team Triangular Series in 2013 =

- Date: 6–14 August 2013
- Location: South Africa
- Result: India A won the series
Teams
South Africa A	Australia A	India A
Captains
Justin Ontong	Aaron Finch	Cheteshwar Pujara
Most runs
Vaughn van Jaarsveld (228)	Shaun Marsh (282)	Shikhar Dhawan (410)
Most wickets
Hardus Viljoen (6)	Josh Hazlewood (12)	Shahbaz Nadeem (9)

The South Africa A Team Triangular Series in 2013 is a List A cricket tournament that was held in South Africa between South Africa A, Australia A and India A. All the matches were played at the LC de Villiers Oval in Pretoria.

== Squads ==
South Africa A	Australia A	India A
Justin Ontong (c); Kyle Abbott; Temba Bavuma; Dean Elgar; Ayabulela Gqamane; Beuran Hendricks; Reeza Hendricks; Richard Levi; Dane Piedt; Rilee Rossouw; Juan Theron; Yaseen Vallie; Roelof van der Merwe; Vaughn van Jaarsveld; Dane Vilas (wk); Hardus Viljoen	Aaron Finch (c); Fawad Ahmed; Nathan Coulter-Nile; Pat Cummins; Alex Doolan; Josh Hazlewood; Moises Henriques; Nic Maddinson; Mitchell Marsh; Shaun Marsh; Glenn Maxwell; Tim Paine (wk); Gurinder Sandhu; Chadd Sayers	Cheteshwar Pujara (c); Stuart Binny; Shikhar Dhawan; Dinesh Karthik (wk); Siddarth Kaul; Shahbaz Nadeem; Ishwar Pandey; Parvez Rasool; Ajinkya Rahane; Suresh Raina; Ambati Rayudu; Wriddhiman Saha (wk); Mohammed Shami; Rohit Sharma; Jaydev Unadkat; Murali Vijay

== Points table ==
Pos	Team	Pld	W	L	T	NR	Pts	NRR
1	Australia A	4	3	1	0	0	12	0.099
2	India A	4	2	2	0	0	8	0.135
3	South Africa A (H)	4	1	3	0	0	4	-0.248

Source: ESPNcricinfo
(H) Host

== Fixtures ==
=== Group stage ===
==== Round 1 ====
6 August 2013
Scorecard

South Africa A 295/8 (50 overs)	v	Australia A 296/7 (49 overs)
Reeza Hendricks 75 (80); Moises Henriques 4/61 (9 overs)		Shaun Marsh 136* (137); Beuran Hendricks 2/57 (10 overs)

Australia A won by 3 wickets
LC de Villiers Oval, Pretoria
Umpires: Johan Cloete (SA) and Shaun George (SA)

- Australia A won the toss and elected to field first.

8 August 2013
Scorecard

Australia A 298/8 (50 overs)	v	India A 291/8 (50 overs)
Glenn Maxwell 145* (79); Shikhar Dhawan 2/39 (7 overs)		Suresh Raina 83 (79); Nathan Coulter-Nile 3/37 (10 overs)

Australia A won by 7 runs
LC de Villiers Oval, Pretoria
Umpires: Johan Cloete (SA) and Shaun George (SA)

- India A won the toss and elected to field first.

9 August 2013
Scorecard

India A 309/5 (38 overs)	v	South Africa A 258/5 (34.4 overs)
Shikhar Dhawan 85 (67); Justin Ontong 2/27 (5 overs)		Dean Elgar 84 (72); Parvez Rasool 2/47 (6 overs)

India A won by 18 runs (D/L method)
LC de Villiers Oval, Pretoria
Umpires: Johan Cloete (SA) and Shaun George (SA)

- South Africa A won the toss and elected to field first.

==== Round 2 ====
10 August 2013
Scorecard

South Africa A 252 (47.4 overs)	v	Australia A 233 (42.2 overs)
Dane Vilas 55 (74); Gurinder Sandhu 4/51 (8.4 overs)		Aaron Finch 119 (129); Juan Theron 4/51 (8 overs)

South Africa A won by 19 runs
LC de Villiers Oval, Pretoria
Umpires: Johan Cloete (SA) and Shaun George (SA)

- South Africa A won the toss and elected to bat first.

11 August 2013
Scorecard

Australia A 310/7 (50 overs)	v	India A 285 (48.3 overs)
Shaun Marsh 96 (107); Stuart Binny 4/55 (10 overs)		Rohit Sharma 61 (57); Moises Henriques 3/24 (6.3 overs)

Australia A won by 25 runs
LC de Villiers Oval, Pretoria
Umpires: Johan Cloete (SA) and Shaun George (SA)

- Australia A won the toss and elected to bat first.

12 August 2013
Scorecard

India A 433/3 (50 overs)	v	South Africa A 394 (48.4 overs)
Shikhar Dhawan 248 (150); Beuran Hendricks 1/62 (9 overs)		Vaughn van Jaarsveld 108 (91); Ishwar Pandey 4/76 (9 overs)

India A won by 39 runs
LC de Villiers Oval, Pretoria
Umpires: Johan Cloete (SA) and Shaun George (SA)

- India A won the toss and elected to bat first.

=== Final ===
14 August 2013
Scorecard

India A 243 (49.2 overs)	v	Australia A 193 (46.3 overs)
Dinesh Karthik 73 (75); Josh Hazlewood 3/31 (10 overs)		Tim Paine 47 (76); Shahbaz Nadeem 3/34 (10 overs)

India A won by 50 runs
LC de Villiers Oval, Pretoria
Umpires: Johan Cloete (SA) and Shaun George (SA)

- India A won the toss and elected to bat first.

== See also ==
- Australia A Team Quadrangular Series in 2014
