= Australia A cricket team in India in 2026–27 =

International cricket tour

	India A	Australia A
- Dates: 22 September – 11 October 2026
Captains	Devdutt Padikkal (FC); Ruturaj Gaikwad (LA)	Peter Handscomb (FC); 3 captains (Note: Will Sutherland captained in 1st LA, Nathan McSweeney captained in 2nd LA and Todd Murphy captained in 3rd LA.)(LA)

FC series
- Result: 2-match series drawn 1–1
Most runs	Kumar Kushagra (170)	Jason Sangha (162)
Most wickets	Shams Mulani (10)	Todd Murphy (10)
- Player of the series: Shams Mulani (Ind A)

LA series
- Result: Australia A won the 3-match series 2–1
Most runs	Rajat Patidar (123)	Nathan McSweeney (194)
Most wickets	Yash Thakur (7)	Mahli Beardman (5); Spencer Johnson (5)
- Player of the series: Nathan McSweeney (Aus A)

The Australia A cricket team toured India in September and October 2026 to play against India A cricket team. The tour consisted of two first-class and three List A matches. In May 2025, the Board of Control for Cricket in India (BCCI) confirmed the fixtures for the tour.

== Squads ==
India A		Australia A	
First-class	List A	First-class	List A
Batters
Devdutt Padikkal (C); Sai Sudharsan (VC); Aman Mokhade; Aayush Pandey; Shaik Rasheed; Yash Rathod	Ruturaj Gaikwad (C); Devdutt Padikkal (VC); Priyansh Arya; Rajat Patidar; Sai Sudharsan	Jason Sangha	
All-Rounders
Anshul Kamboj; Nachiket Bhute; Shams Mulani; Tanush Kotian	Arshad Khan; Arshin Kulkarni; Hardik Pandya; Nishant Sindhu; Vipraj Nigam	Campbell Kellaway; Fergus O'Neill; Jack Edwards; Liam Scott; Nathan McSweeney; Sam Konstas	Aaron Hardie; Jack Edwards; Liam Scott; Mitchell Owen; Nathan McSweeney; Nikhil Chaudhary; Sam Konstas
Wicket-Keepers
Kumar Kushagra; Narayan Jagadeesan	Kumar Kushagra; Prabhsimran Singh	Josh Philippe; Peter Handscomb; Sam Harper	Josh Philippe; Lachlan Shaw
Bowlers
Praful Hinge; Tushar Deshpande; Vijaykumar Vyshak	Gurjapneet Singh; Yash Thakur	Brendan Doggett; Corey Rocchiccioli; Jhye Richardson; Liam Hatcher; Todd Murphy	Ben Dwarshuis; Mahli Beardman; Spencer Johnson; Tanveer Sangha; Todd Murphy

Source: Cricbuzz

== First-class series ==
=== 1st Unofficial Test ===
22–25 September 2026
Scorecard

India A	v	Australia A
334 (117.3 overs); Kumar Kushagra 113 (240); Corey Rocchiccioli 4/95 (25 overs)		171 (55.3 overs); Jason Sangha 46 (64); Shams Mulani 4/67 (18 overs)
199 (57.4 overs); Devdutt Padikkal 59 (88); Todd Murphy 4/48 (15 overs)		200 (55.1 overs); Fergus O'Neill 47 (52); Tushar Deshpande 3/14 (8 overs)

India A won by 162 runs
CAP Siechem Ground, Pondicherry
Umpires: Bhavesh Patel (Ind) and Mohit Krishnadas (Ind)
Player of the match: Kumar Kushagra (Ind A)

- India A won the toss and elected to bat.

=== 2nd Unofficial Test ===
29 September–2 October 2026
Scorecard

Australia A	v	India A
358 (116.3 overs); Sam Harper 128 (223); Anshul Kamboj 3/34 (17.3 overs)		167 (68 overs); Shaik Rasheed 42 (167); Corey Rocchiccioli 3/33 (13 overs)
173/4d (49 overs); Jason Sangha 44* (63); Tanush Kotian 2/55 (15 overs)		310/9 (103 overs); Yash Rathod 80 (138); Liam Scott 5/37 (18 overs)

Match drawn
CAP Siechem Ground, Pondicherry
Umpires: K. Nidhin (Ind) and Chettithody Shamshuddin (Ind)
Player of the match: Sam Harper (Aus A)

- Australia A won the toss and elected to bat.

== List A series ==
=== 1st Unofficial ODI ===
6 October 2026
Scorecard

Australia A 274 (48.2 overs)	v	India A 149 (31.4 overs)
Nathan McSweeney 123 (135); Suryansh Shedge 4/40 (7 overs)		Rajat Patidar 53 (51); Mahli Beardman 4/23 (6 overs)

Australia A won by 125 runs
CAP Siechem Ground, Pondicherry
Umpires: Tony Ematty (Ind) and Kannur Swaroopanand (Ind)
Player of the match: Nathan McSweeney (Aus A)

- Australia A won the toss and elected to bat.

=== 2nd Unofficial ODI ===
9 October 2026
Scorecard

Australia A 275 (49.5 overs)	v	India A 206 (45.2 overs)
Sam Konstas 67 (88); Arshad Khan 3/56 (9 overs)		Rajat Patidar 67 (82); Spencer Johnson 3/35 (8 overs)

Australia A won by 69 runs
CAP Siechem Ground, Pondicherry
Umpires: Ajitesh Argal (Ind) and Tony Ematty (Ind)
Player of the match: Spencer Johnson (Aus A)

- Australia A won the toss and elected to bat.

=== 3rd Unofficial ODI ===
11 October 2026
Scorecard

India A 275 (47.3 overs)	v	Australia A 226 (46.2 overs)
Suryansh Shedge 66 (60); Ben Dwarshuis 3/34 (7.3 overs)		Josh Philippe 56 (48); Gurjapneet Singh 3/56 (9 overs)

India A won by 49 runs
CAP Siechem Ground, Pondicherry
Umpires: Ajitesh Argal (Ind) and Kannur Swaroopanand (Ind)
Player of the match: Vipraj Nigam (Ind A)

- Australia A won the toss and elected to field.
