= Mitchell Johnson =

Australian cricketer (born 1981)

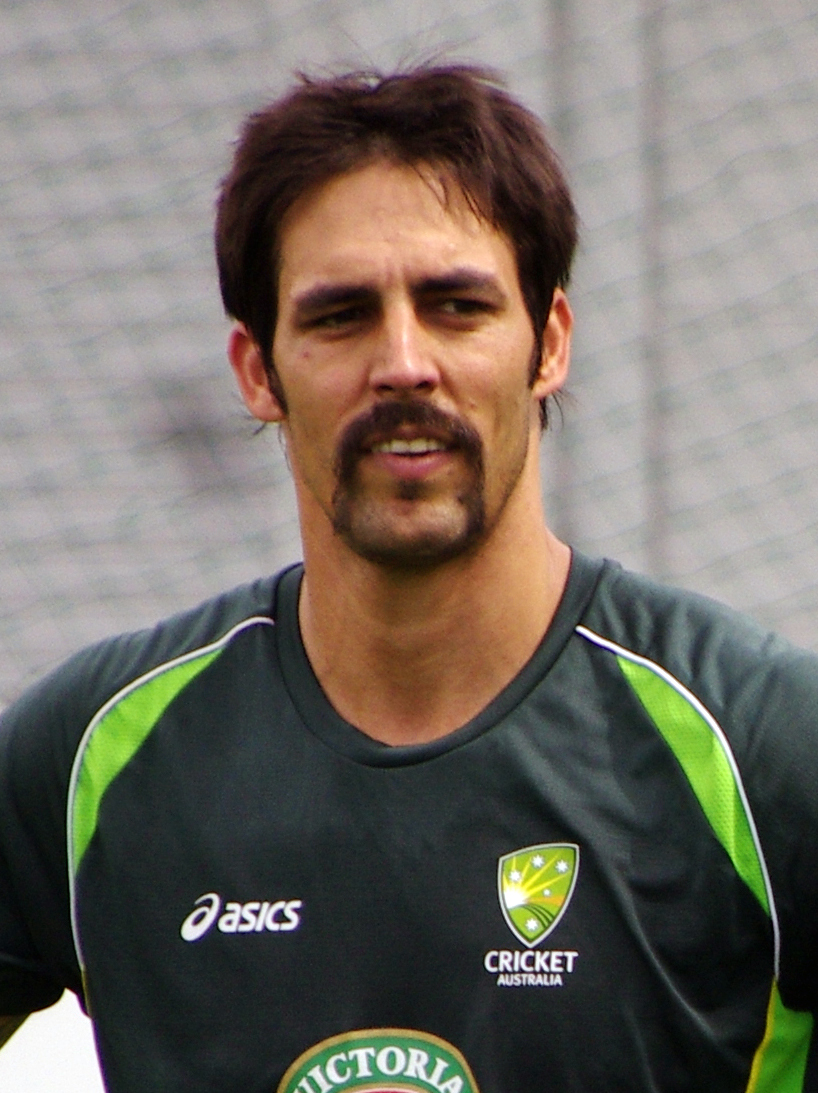
- Johnson in January 2014

Personal information
- Full name: Mitchell Guy Johnson
- Born: 2 November 1981 (age 45); Townsville, Queensland, Australia
- Nickname: Midge, Notch
- Height: 189 cm (6 ft 2 in)
- Batting: Left-handed
- Bowling: Left-arm fast
- Role: Bowler

International information
- National side: Australia (2005–2015)
- Test debut (cap 398): 8 November 2007 v Sri Lanka
- Last Test: 17 November 2015 v New Zealand
- ODI debut (cap 156): 10 December 2005 v New Zealand
- Last ODI: 29 March 2015 v New Zealand
- ODI shirt no.: 25
- T20I debut (cap 24): 12 September 2007 v Zimbabwe
- Last T20I: 31 August 2013 v England
- T20I shirt no.: 25

Domestic team information
- Years: Team
- 2001–2008: Queensland
- 2008–2015: Western Australia (squad no. 25)
- 2013: Mumbai Indians (squad no. 25)
- 2014–2016: Kings XI Punjab (squad no. 25)
- 2016-2018: Perth Scorchers (squad no. 25)
- 2017: Mumbai Indians (squad no. 25)
- 2018: Karachi Kings (squad no. 25)
- 2018: Kolkata Knight Riders (squad no. 25)

Career statistics
Competition	Test	ODI	FC	LA
Matches	73	153	117	184
Runs scored	2,065	951	3,180	1,115
Batting average	22.20	16.11	22.87	16.15
100s/50s	1/11	0/2	2/15	0/2
Top score	123*	73*	123*	73*
Balls bowled	16,001	7,489	23,765	9,227
Wickets	313	239	465	284
Bowling average	28.40	25.26	28.71	26.01
5 wickets in innings	12	3	17	4
10 wickets in match	3	0	4	0
Best bowling	8/61	6/31	8/61	6/31
Catches/stumpings	27/–	35/–	39/–	39/–
Medal record
Men's Cricket
Representing Australia
ICC Cricket World Cup
Winner	2007 West Indies
Winner	2015 Australia and New Zealand
ICC Champions Trophy
Winner	2006 India
Winner	2009 South Africa
ICC T20 World Cup
Runner-up	2010 West Indies
- Source: ESPNcricinfo, 17 November 2015

Mitchell Guy Johnson (born 2 November 1981) is an Australian former cricketer, who played all forms of the game for his national team. He is a left-arm fast bowler and left-handed batsman. He represented Australia in international cricket from 2005 to 2015. Johnson is considered to be one of the greatest fast bowlers of his era. With his time representing Australia, Johnson won multiple ICC titles with the team: the 2007 Cricket World Cup, the 2015 Cricket World Cup, the 2006 ICC Champions Trophy, and the 2009 ICC Champions Trophy.

Johnson was awarded the International Cricket Council's Sir Garfield Sobers Trophy (ICC Cricketer of the Year) in 2009. After suffering a drop in form that led to his removal from the national team in early 2013, he was particularly successful in his 'comeback' to the Australian Test squad during the 2013–14 Ashes series in Australia, during which he dominated England's batting. He cemented his place in the Australian team in the following Test series against South Africa and was rewarded with his second Sir Garfield Sobers Trophy and first ICC Test Player of the Year award in 2014. He played a key role in the semi-final and final matches of the 2015 World Cup, which ultimately culminated in Australia winning the World Cup for the fifth time.

Johnson retired from all forms of international cricket in November 2015, having represented Australia in a total of 256 matches. He was the last active Australian player with a Test cap number in the 300s. In terms of time span, Johnson is also the quickest bowler to reach 150 Test wickets, doing so in 2 years and 139 days.

In August 2018, Johnson announced his retirement from all forms of cricket.

== Early life ==
Johnson was born and raised in Townsville, Queensland. His first sporting love was tennis with his idol being Pete Sampras. At 14 he was offered the opportunity to move to Brisbane to further his tennis career but turned it down. It was not until the age of 17 that Johnson gave up on his childhood dream of being a professional tennis player and began focusing on cricket.

== Early cricket career ==
When Johnson attended a fast bowling clinic in Brisbane at age 17, former Test fast bowler Dennis Lillee identified him as a "once-in-nine-lives prospect". Lillee contacted former teammate Rod Marsh and arranged for Johnson to join the Australian Cricket Academy in Adelaide.

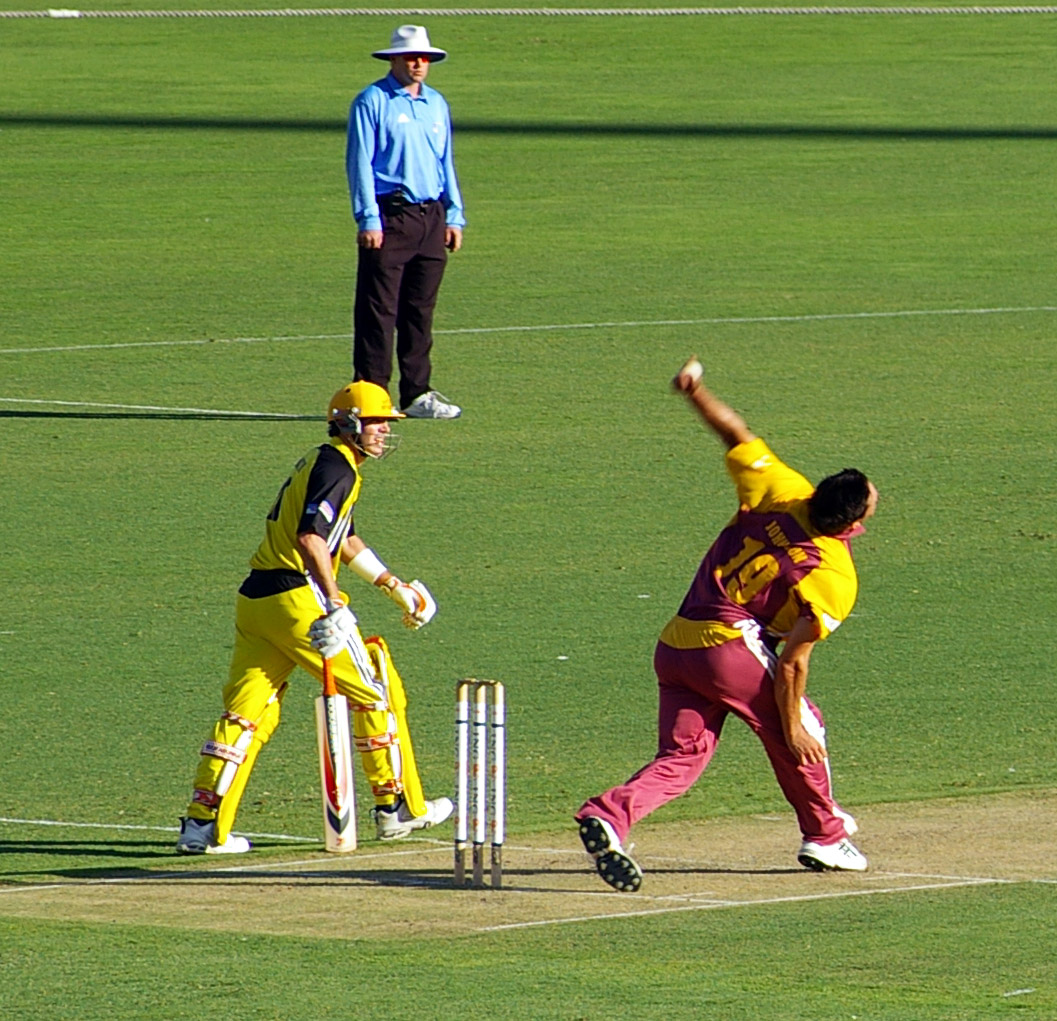
Johnson bowling for Queensland in 2005

Johnson subsequently played for the Australian Under-19 team that toured England in 1999, however recurrent back injuries hampered his prospects. He recovered to start his first-class career two years later, when he was selected to play state cricket for his native Queensland. Playing for Queensland against New Zealand, Johnson hit a six off the first ball he faced in first-class cricket. In September 2005, he was in the Australia A cricket team that toured Pakistan.

Johnson switched from the Queensland Bulls to the Western Warriors on 25 July 2008.

== International career ==
=== 2005–2006 ===
In December 2005, Johnson was selected for the Australian One Day International team, making his debut against New Zealand in Christchurch, with chairman of selectors Trevor Hohns justifying his selection on the grounds of grooming players for the future.

Johnson gave the first signs of his potential at international level against the strong Indian batting line-up in a One Day International in Malaysia, Johnson's 7th. He took 4/11 off just 4 overs, including the wickets of Sachin Tendulkar, Rahul Dravid and Yuvraj Singh. Johnson then played in the Australian 2006 ICC Champions Trophy team and in the group A match against England where he took 3/40, including the wicket of Kevin Pietersen.

Johnson was chosen to be in the squad for the first Ashes Test beginning on 23 November 2006, but was 12th man in all of the games.

=== 2007–2008 ===
On 26 January 2007, Johnson took 4 wickets in 8 balls during the seventh match of the CB Series against England, for which he earned man of the match honours. In October 2007, Johnson helped Australia seal the ODI series in India. He finished as the top wicket-taker with 14 wickets, which showed his abilities, even on the slow pitches of the sub-continent. In the fifth ODI in Vadodara he took 5/26, his first international five-wicket haul.

On 10 November 2007, while making his Australian Test match debut against Sri Lanka at his home ground, the Gabba, Johnson took his first wicket – that of Thilan Samaraweera, caught by Adam Gilchrist. Johnson went on to take 4/96 in the match.

On 19 January 2008, Johnson scored his first ever Test half-century, against India in Perth, having been both dropped and bowled off a no-ball, although Australia ended up losing the match.

On the second day of the first Test against South Africa in Perth on 18 December 2008, Johnson took seven wickets for just 12 runs, including five wickets for two runs near the close, to reduce the tourists from 3/234 to 8/241. He ended with 8/61 the next day. Despite this performance, Australia went on to lose the Test. Batting with Michael Clarke, he made 64 later in the series.

=== 2009 ===
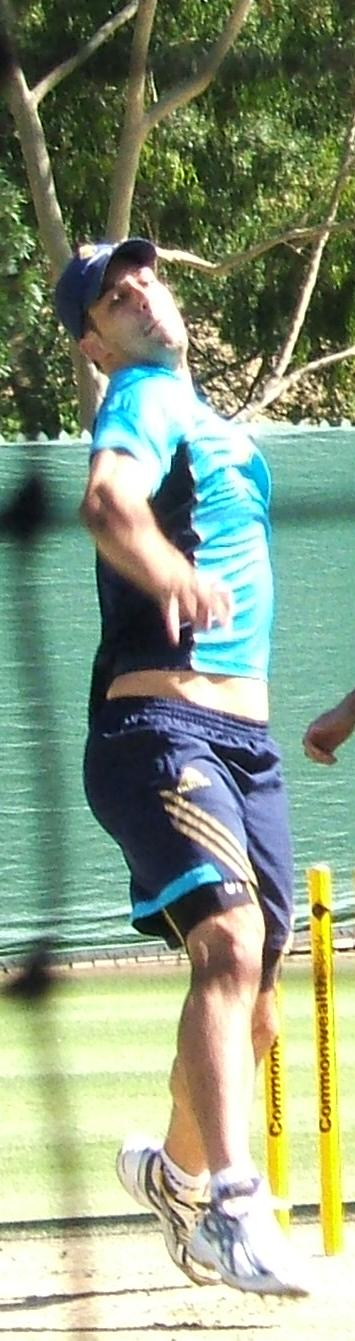
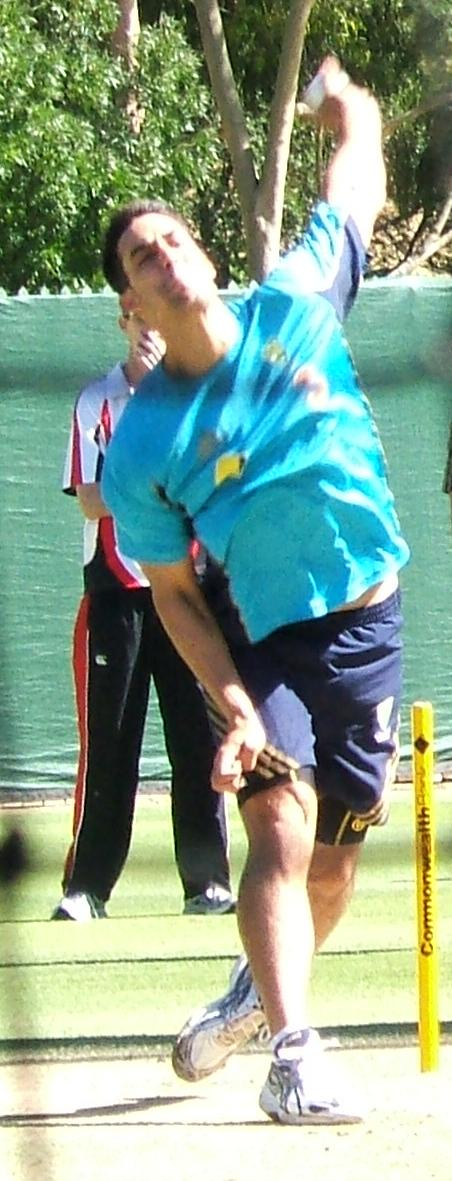
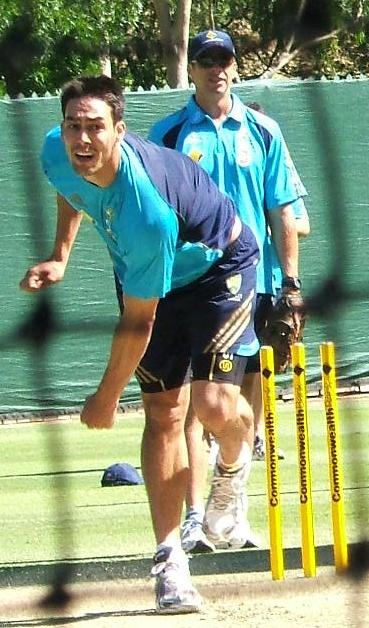
Johnson bowling in the nets in January 2009

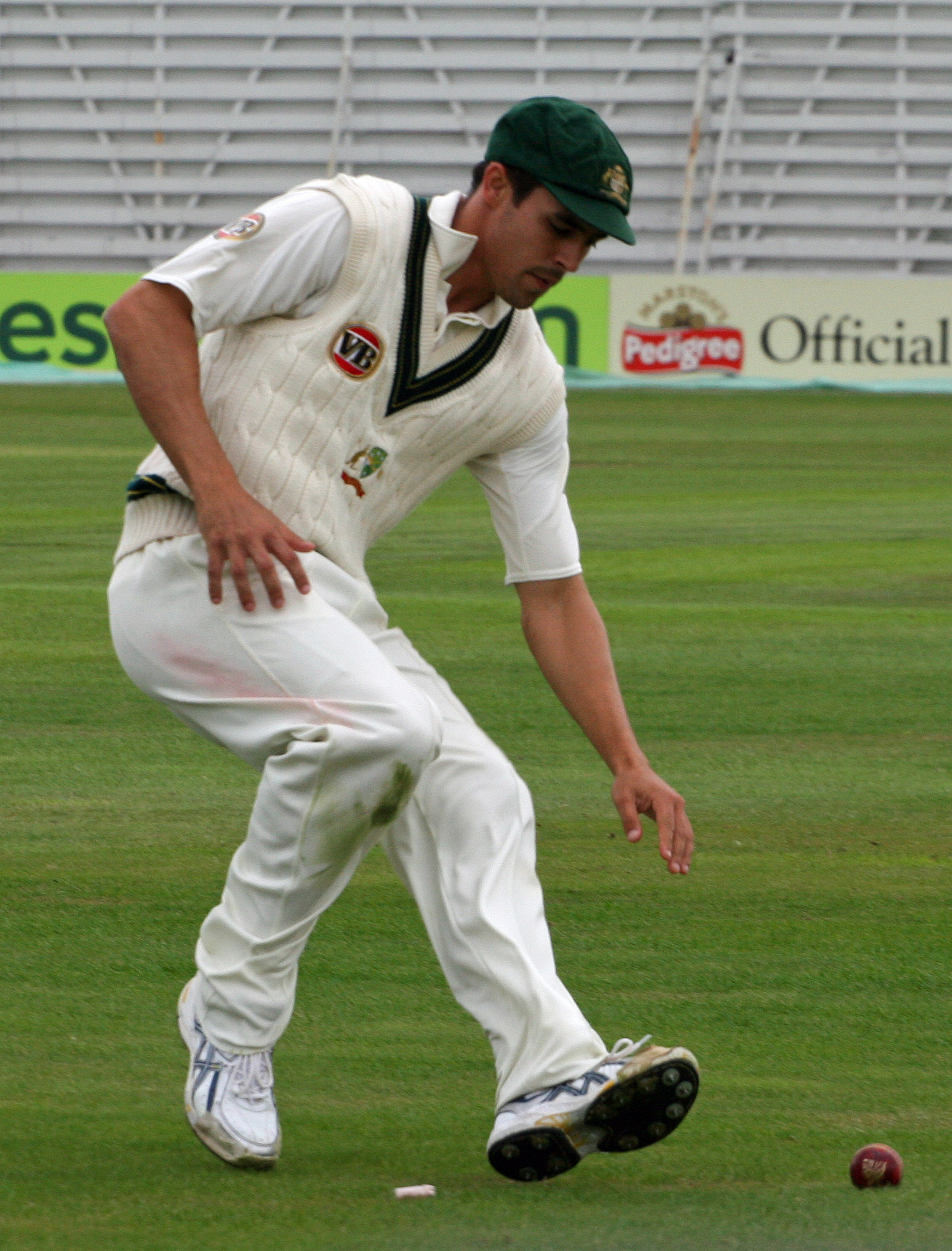
Johnson fields in a tour match against Northamptonshire during the 2009 Ashes series.

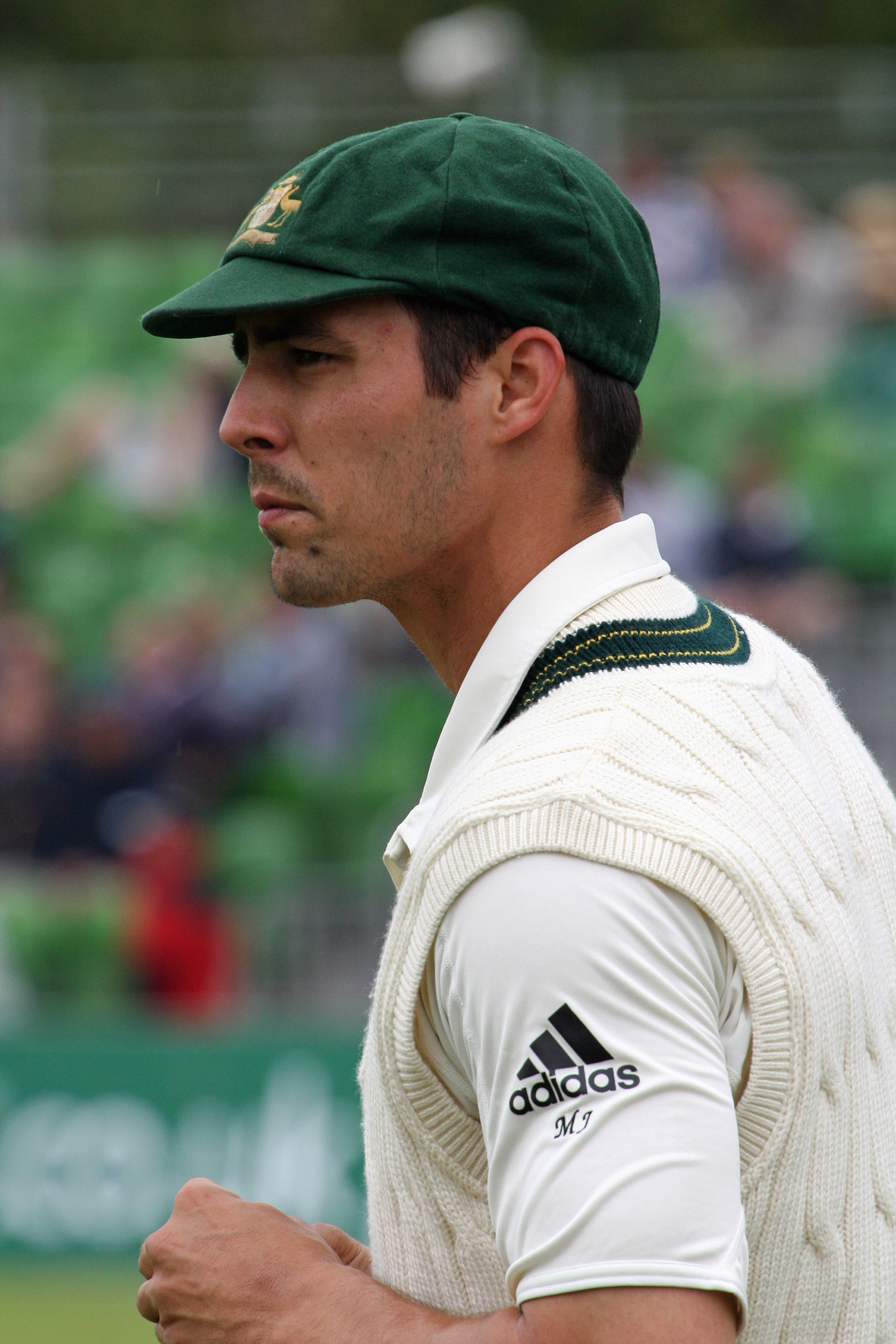
Johnson with Australia in 2009

The 2009 tour to South Africa saw an important development in Johnson's armoury – the ability to consistently swing the ball into the right-hander, which he previously had struggled to achieve. During the first Test, on 27 February 2009, Johnson scored 96 not out, to help Australia post 466 all out. This included one over in which he scored 26 runs off the bowling of Paul Harris, hitting two fours and three sixes, the last of which carried out of the stadium and broke the record for the most runs in an over for Australia in a Test match. He also took eight wickets with the ball.

In the second Test, he unleashed a fiery spell of fast bowling that gained him two wickets in his first over and three in his first spell, as well as sending both Jacques Kallis and Graeme Smith off, retired hurt. After this, notable cricket commentator Peter Roebuck described him as the best fast bowler in the world.

In the third Test, with Australia almost defeated, he struck his maiden Test century 123 not out, reaching triple figures in only 86 balls. With tail-ender Bryce McGain for company, Johnson decided to take on the bowling and struck Dale Steyn for six to reach his century. Although Australia went on to lose the Test match by an innings, Johnson was named man of the series, with 16 wickets and over 250 runs in 3 matches.

During the 2009 Ashes tour he was criticised for his poor bowling and his lack of control. Johnson's position as spearhead of the Australian seam-attack was called into question, with match figures of 3/200 in the second Test at Lord's and his demotion to first-change bowler in Australia's tour game against Northamptonshire. In the match against Northamptonshire, he returned 7/67 from 18.1 overs as Australia won by 135 runs. Despite his poor form he was selected for the third Test. Johnson consequently re-discovered some form in the fourth Test, taking 5/69 in the second innings.

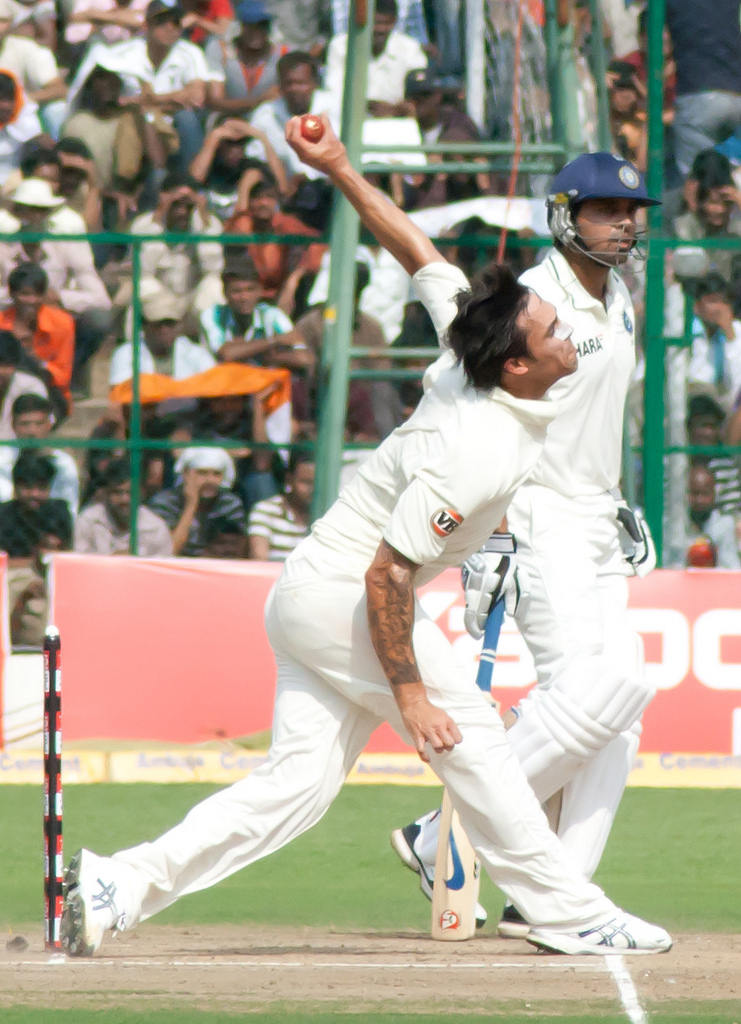
Johnson bowling against India in 2010

Australia came into the 2009 ICC Champions Trophy ranked second in ODIs; along with being the event's reigning champions. They opened their campaign against an undermanned West Indian outfit who were without prominent players because of an industrial dispute. After being put into bat, Australia fell to 7/172 after 40 overs, before finishing on 8/275 in 50 overs as the pitch flattened out. Johnson scored a career best 73 not out, as Australia scored 69 runs from their batting Powerplay (between overs 44 and 49). In an innings which produced "fierce, clean hitting", Johnson struck three sixes and eight fours in his quick-fire 47 ball innings. Although Johnson went wicketless in the West Indian innings, he secured the man of the match award as Australia won by 50 runs.

Johnson appeared to get back to his best towards the end of 2009, earning praise from captain Ricky Ponting during the summer series against both the West Indies and Pakistan. He finished the year as the world's top wicket-taker (63) and also became the first Australian to take 30 wickets and score 300 runs in a calendar year. Johnson's best T20I batting performance was a 28 not out against Sri Lanka during the 2009 ICC World Twenty20 tournament played in England and his best bowling was 3–15, also recorded against Sri Lanka during the 2010 ICC World Twenty20 tournament in the West Indies.

=== 2010–2013 ===
In the 2010–11 Ashes series, Johnson took more wickets than any other Australian with 15 (36.93), even though he played only 4 Tests. In the first Test at the Gabba he was hit for 0/170 in the match and was so out of form that he was dropped. Returning for the third Test at the WACA he hit 62, took 6/38 and 3/44 was instrumental in Australia's 267-run victory. However, his wayward bowling returned and Johnson became the subject of a chanting by the Barmy Army whenever he bowled; He bowls to the left, He bowls to the right, That Mitchell Johnson, His bowling is shite. In the fifth Test at the Sydney Cricket Ground, England fans sang this as he walked to the crease and he made a first ball duck as England won by an innings to retain the Ashes. In July 2012, he admitted the jibes he'd received from England fans during successive Ashes series defeats had dented his confidence. He has also, however, considered the choice to target him as a compliment. Ever since his overall poor Ashes series, Johnson claimed a spot in the South African series. He did not fare well in that series either, without picking up a 4 or 5 wicket haul, leaking many runs and not contributing heavily with the bat. He picked up a toe injury, escaping being dropped. He did find himself, later that year, in the 3rd Test against South Africa in Perth. There, he bowled exquisitely, picking up the prized wicket of Hashim Amla and finishing with a four-wicket haul. He also gained a place in the Test series against Sri Lanka and although he did not play in the 1st Test, he was the man of the match in the 2nd, claiming match figures of 6–79 as well as playing a brilliant 92 not out. He then had to play as an all-rounder in the 3rd Test due to Shane Watson's injury. He had a poor first innings with the ball and bat with figures of 1–118 and only making 13, despite a fierce spell to Lahiru Thirimanne which did not claim any wickets. He did bowl well in the second innings however, claiming the prized wickets of Tillakaratne Dilshan and Thirimanne.

Before the 3rd Test against India in March 2013, Johnson was dropped along with James Pattinson, Shane Watson and Usman Khawaja following a breach of discipline. Michael Clarke, the captain, revealed that the extreme step had been taken as a result of repeated infractions which led to Watson flying back home and contemplating Test retirement. Former players reacted with astonishment at the harsh decision taken by the team management.

=== 2013–14 Ashes series ===
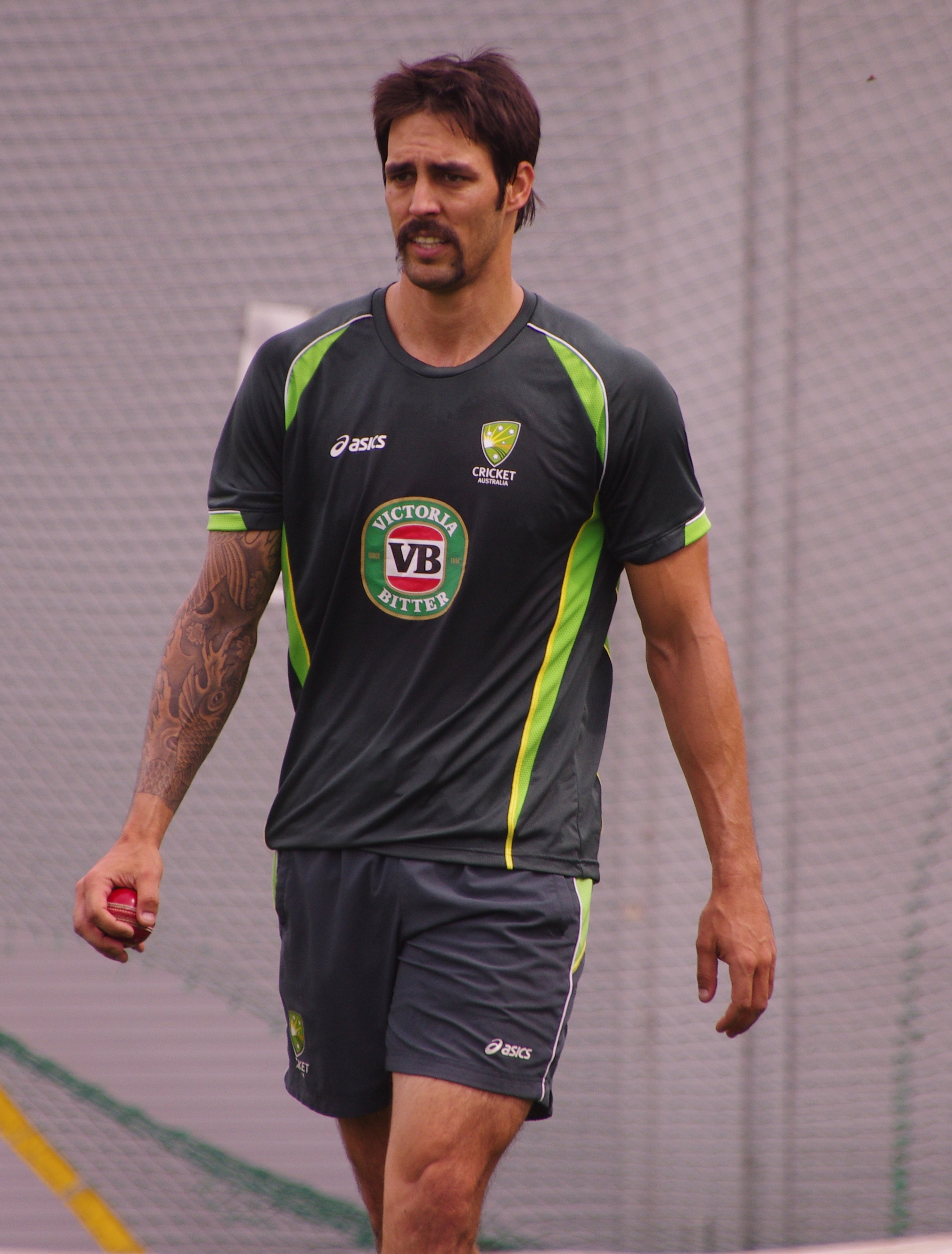
Johnson in 2014

After a year away from international cricket, including being dropped for the Ashes tour of England, Johnson returned to the Australia team for the return Ashes series in Australia. In the first innings of the first Test, after Australia ended with 295 all out (Johnson himself contributing 64), England were put under pressure by Johnson's intimidatingly quick and thunderously aggressive bowling style. After claiming the wicket of Jonathan Trott just before lunch on the second day, he then dismissed Michael Carberry, Joe Root and Graeme Swann in successive overs, engineering a dramatic English collapse from 2/82 to 136 all out. He backed up his 4–61 in the first innings with 5–42 in the second to seal a crushing victory.

In the second Test match at Adelaide Oval, Australia batted first and scored 570 runs in the first two days on a pitch that was very good for batting. England started their first innings at the end of day two, and Johnson dismissed captain Alastair Cook early. On day three, Johnson bowled a spell after lunch that saw him take 5 wickets for just 12 runs. Johnson dismissed the settled batsman Ben Stokes, then the incoming batsman Matt Prior three deliveries later. English bowler Stuart Broad came in to bat next, and he spent time asking for something on the sight screen to be fixed before facing a ball. Johnson bowled Broad the next ball, putting him on a hat trick. Four overs later, Johnson dismissed Graeme Swann, which brought James Anderson in to bat. Johnson bowled Anderson first ball, putting him a hat trick for the second time, and gave Anderson a long stare-down as Anderson departed. Johnson took England's final wicket later in the day, and finished the innings with bowling figures of 7 wickets for 40 runs. Australia won the match, and Johnson finished with 17 wickets from the first two matches.

Johnson continued his exceptional form throughout the series, finding the consistency he had previously lacked, and took 37 wickets in the five-match series, which Australia won 5–0. He was named man of the series, having been man of the match in three of the five matches (the first, second and fourth Tests). At the end of the series in January 2014, Johnson also won the Allan Border Medal (awarded to the best-performing male Australian cricketer of the year) for the first and only time in his career.

=== 2014–2015 ===
Johnson carried his form into the 2014 Test series in South Africa. In the first Test match at Centurion Park, he took 7 wickets in the first innings and 5 wickets in the second innings to give Australia a 281-run win. His match figures of 12 wickets for 127 runs were the second-best figures ever by an Australian bowler against South Africa. Australia went on to win the 3-match series 2–1 with Johnson taking 22 wickets.

During the first innings of the 2015 Ashes series, he picked up the worst bowling figures of his career, 0–111, where he was torn apart by England's batsmen. However, in the 2nd Test at Lord's, Johnson recovered to take 6 wickets in the match and a run-out of Ben Stokes to help Australia to a 405-run win to level the series with England at 1–1. In the next Test at Edgbaston, Johnson became the first Australian player since Shane Warne to claim at least 300 wickets and score at least 2000 runs.

Johnson announced his retirement from all forms of international cricket on 17 November 2015, before play on the final day of the second Test of the Trans-Tasman Trophy series, a three-match series against New Zealand. While coming out to bat in his last innings later that day at his adopted home ground, the WACA, Johnson received a guard of honour from the New Zealand players, who congratulated him for his prolific career. He scored 35 runs in his final innings and then took both wickets in New Zealand's second innings, with the match ending in a draw that was enough for Australia to retain the Trans-Tasman Trophy.

== Twenty20 leagues ==
=== Big Bash League (BBL) ===
In August 2016, after Johnson's retirement from international cricket, it was announced that he had signed with the Perth Scorchers for the 2016–17 Big Bash League season. In the semi-final against the Melbourne Stars, Johnson produced the most economical bowling figures in BBL history with 3/3 from 4 overs. He opened the bowling for Perth and took a wicket with his first delivery and a second three balls later. He did not concede any runs in his first two overs, and took a wicket with the first ball of his third over, giving him figures of 3/0. He finally conceded a run with his 18th delivery and conceded two more runs in his final over. At the time, only two bowlers in Twenty20 history had conceded less runs in a four over spell.

=== Indian Premier League (IPL) ===
In February 2014, Johnson was sold to Kings XI Punjab of Indian Premier League for A$1,160,000. In February 2017, he was bought by the Mumbai Indians for the 2017 Indian Premier League for 2 crores. In January 2018, he was bought by the Kolkata Knight Riders for the 2018 Indian Premier League for US$314,000.

== Statistics and achievements ==
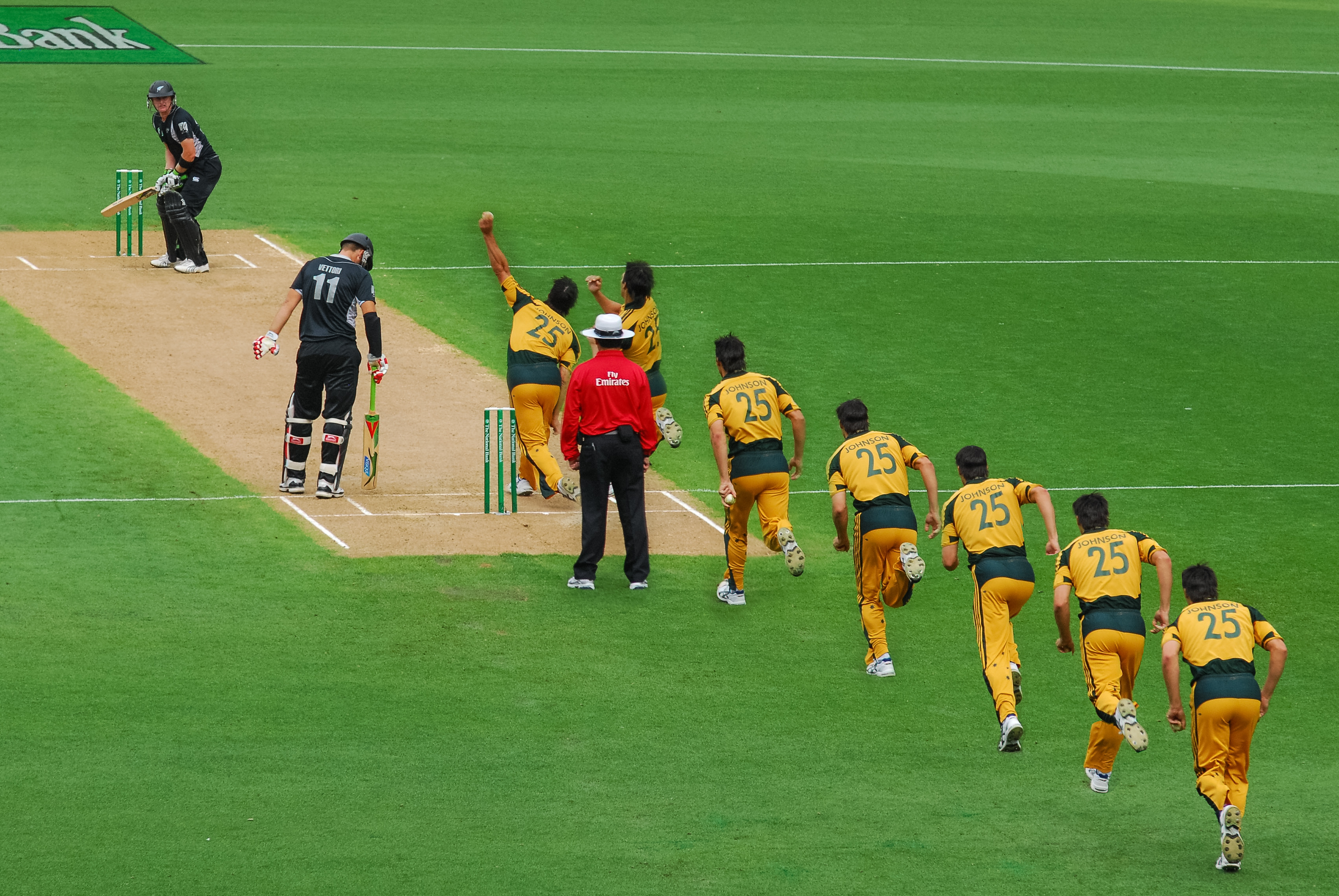
A photo montage of Johnson running in to bowl

=== Records and achievements ===
- The fifth highest wicket-taker in Test matches for Australia with 313 wickets, passing Brett Lee's tally of 310 Test wickets in his final Test.
- The fourth highest wicket-taker among left-arm fast bowlers in Tests, behind Mitchell Starc (420, currently active), Wasim Akram (414) and Chaminda Vaas (355).
- Has the best bowling figures for a left-arm fast bowler in a single Test innings – 8/61 vs South Africa at the WACA in 2008.
- Took the most wickets (37) in the 2013–14 Ashes series at an average of 13.97 – the most by a fast bowler in the Ashes since 1981.
- Has the most number of Test wickets against South Africa (64), since their return to international cricket in 1992.
- Took 80 wickets (in 39 innings) in the 4th innings of a Test match, which is fifth best for any bowler and second best among fast bowlers, behind only Glenn McGrath (103).
- The 13th player overall and second Australian, after Shane Warne, to take 300+ wickets and score 2000+ runs in Test cricket.
- Has 590 international wickets (313 in Tests, 239 in ODIs and 38 in T20Is) to his name across all formats, in just 256 international matches (320 innings) at an average of 26.65. He is also fifth on the list of international wicket-takers for Australia, behind Shane Warne (1001), Glenn McGrath (949), Brett Lee (718) and Mitchell Starc .

=== Awards ===
- Sir Garfield Sobers Trophy (ICC Cricketer of the Year): 2009, 2014
- ICC Test Player of the Year: 2014
- ICC Test Team of the Year: 2009, 2014
- ICC ODI Team of the Year: 2008
- McGilvray Medal: 2008, 2009
- Allan Border Medal: 2014

== Television ==
In 2020, it was announced Johnson would be participating the Seven Network's reality program SAS Australia.

== Personal life ==
Johnson married former model and karate black belt Jessica Bratich in May 2011. The couple has a daughter born in 2012, and a son born in 2016. Johnson is cross-dominant: he bats and bowls left handed but uses his right hand to write.

In 2016, Mitchell Johnson published his autobiography Resilient.

Awards
Preceded by Shivnarine Chanderpaul	Sir Garfield Sobers Trophy; 2009	Succeeded by Sachin Tendulkar
Preceded by Michael Clarke	Sir Garfield Sobers Trophy; 2014	Succeeded by Steve Smith
Preceded by Michael Clarke	ICC Test Player of the Year; 2014	Succeeded by Steve Smith
Preceded by Michael Clarke	Allan Border Medal; 2014	Succeeded by Steve Smith
