= Gregory Willows =

English cricketer (born 1999)

Personal information
- Full name: Gregory Peter Willows
- Born: 15 February 1999 (age 27); Dorchester, England
- Source: Cricinfo, 30 June 2019

Gregory Peter Willows (born 15 February 1999) is an English cricketer. He made his List A debut on 30 June 2019, for Gloucestershire against the Australia A cricket team.
