= New Zealand A cricket team in Australia in 2023 =

International cricket tour

| | Australia A | New Zealand A |
- Dates: 28 August – 15 September 2023
| Captains | Nathan McSweeney (FC); Will Sutherland (LA) | Tom Bruce (FC & LA) |

FC series
- Result: New Zealand A won the 2-match series 2–0
| Most runs | Caleb Jewell (228) | Tom Bruce (221) |
| Most wickets | Mitchell Perry (12) | Scott Kuggeleijn (13) |

LA series
- Result: Australia A won the 3-match series 3–0
| Most runs | Matt Renshaw (100) | Tim Seifert (114) |
| Most wickets | Henry Thornton (11) | William O'Rourke (7) |

The New Zealand A cricket team toured Australia in August and September 2023 to play the Australia A cricket team. The tour featured two unofficial Tests and three unofficial One Day Internationals with all five matches having first-class and List A status. The matches were played at Allan Border Field in Brisbane and the Great Barrier Reef Arena in Mackay, Queensland.

== Squads ==
| Australia A | | New Zealand A |
| First-class | List A | First-class and List A |
|---|---|---|
| Nathan McSweeney (c); ~~Wes Agar~~; Cameron Bancroft; Jordan Buckingham; Ben Dwarshuis; Caleb Jewell; Campbell Kellaway; Matthew Kelly; Matthew Kuhnemann; Nathan McAndrew; Joel Paris; Jimmy Peirson (wk); Mitchell Perry; Josh Philippe (wk); Mark Steketee; Mitchell Swepson; Tim Ward | Will Sutherland (c); ~~Wes Agar~~; Oliver Davies; ~~Ben Dwarshuis~~; ~~Liam Hatcher~~; Caleb Jewell; Matthew Kuhnemann; Marnus Labuschagne; Ben McDermott; ~~Todd Murphy~~; Josh Philippe (wk); Matthew Renshaw; Tom Rogers; Gurinder Sandhu; Matthew Short; ~~Mark Steketee~~; Henry Thornton; Ashton Turner | Tom Bruce (c); Muhammad Abbas; Adithya Ashok; Leo Carter; Josh Clarkson; Henry Cooper; Jacob Duffy; Cam Fletcher (wk); Dean Foxcroft; Mitchell Hay (wk); Nick Kelly; Scott Kuggeleijn; William O'Rourke; Ajaz Patel; Michael Rae; Brett Randell; Tim Seifert; Sean Solia |

On 9 August 2023, the initial Australia A squad was announced with the New Zealand A squad being announced later on 22 August 2023. Prior to the start of the series, Wes Agar was ruled out due to a back injury, with Todd Murphy also withdrawing due to general soreness. Ben Dwarshuis was ruled out with a back injury sustained during the second unofficial test. Australia A also lost Liam Hatcher and Mark Steketee to injury following the first unofficial one-day international, with Caleb Jewell, Tom Rogers, and Henry Thornton being added as replacements.

== First-class series ==
=== 1st Unofficial Test ===
28–31 August 2023
Scorecard

| New Zealand A | v | Australia A |
| 147 (44.5 overs); Tom Bruce 37 (59); Mitchell Swepson 3/19 (4.5 overs) | | 263 (73.3 overs); Caleb Jewell 78 (95); Scott Kuggeleijn 5/74 (19.3 overs) |
| 468 (106.2 overs); Scott Kuggeleijn 101* (85); Mitchell Perry 4/77 (17.2 overs) | | 127 (40 overs); Cameron Bancroft 47 (113); Scott Kuggeleijn 4/39 (9 overs) |

New Zealand A won by 225 runs
Allan Border Field, Brisbane
Umpires: Donovan Koch (Aus) and Sam Nogajski (Aus)
Player of the match: Scott Kuggeleijn (NZ)

- Australia A won the toss and elected to field.

=== 2nd Unofficial Test ===
4–7 September 2023 (D/N)
Scorecard

| New Zealand A | v | Australia A |
| 277 (78.2 overs); Nick Kelly 64 (119); Mitchell Perry 4/41 (14.2 overs) | | 275 (78.3 overs); Josh Philippe 105 (114); Sean Solia 2/33 (9 overs) |
| 299 (89.3 overs); Tom Bruce 105* (159); Liam Hatcher 4/92 (22.3) | | 233 (57.3 overs); Caleb Jewell 131 (169); Scott Kuggeleijn 3/50 (16 overs) |

New Zealand A won by 68 runs
Great Barrier Reef Arena, Mackay
Umpires: Michael Graham-Smith (Aus) and Phillip Gillespie (Aus)

- New Zealand A won the toss and elected to bat.

== List A series ==
=== 1st Unofficial ODI ===
10 September 2023
Scorecard

| New Zealand A 169 (46 overs) | v | Australia A 5/170 (31.3 overs) |
| Nick Kelly 52 (89); Gurinder Sandhu 5/27 (9 overs) | | Ashton Turner 56 (61); Michael Rae 3/42 (10 overs) |

Australia A won by 5 wickets
Great Barrier Reef Arena, Mackay
Umpires: Michael Graham-Smith (Aus) and Phillip Gillespie (Aus)

- Australia A won the toss and elected to field.

=== 2nd Unofficial ODI ===
13 September 2023 (D/N)
Scorecard

| Australia A 243 (44.1 overs) | v | New Zealand A 135 (31.1 overs) |
| Ben McDermott 70 (59); William O'Rourke 4/29 (9.1 overs) | | Nick Kelly 44 (55); Henry Thornton 7/39 (10 overs) |

Australia A won by 108 runs
Allan Border Field, Brisbane
Umpires: Donovan Koch (Aus) and Gerard Abood (Aus)

- New Zealand A won the toss and elected to field.
- Henry Thornton took his maiden five-wicket haul in List A cricket.

=== 3rd Unofficial ODI ===
15 September 2023
Scorecard

| New Zealand A 228 (48.3 overs) | v | Australia A 8/229 (41 overs) |
| Tim Seifert 100 (120); Henry Thornton 4/32 (9.3 overs) | | Matthew Short 52 (42); William O'Rourke 3/44 (10 overs) |

Australia A won by 2 wickets
Allan Border Field, Brisbane
Umpires: Donovan Koch (Aus) and Shawn Craig (Aus)

- Australia A won the toss and elected to field.
