= Australia A cricket team in Pakistan in 2005–06 =

The Australia A cricket team toured Pakistan in September 2005. Australia A are a team made up of the second tier of Australian cricketers, just below the national team. They played two first class games against Pakistan A, one which they lost by seven wickets, and one draw. In addition, they played three one-day games before departing Pakistan, chasing down a total winning the first by seven wickets, losing the other by eight wickets and 14 overs, but coming back to take a 97-run win in the third.

== Squads ==
Australia A		Pakistan A
Brad Haddin	(c), (wk)^{1}	Misbah-ul-Haq	(c)
Michael Hussey	(c)^{1}	Zulqarnain Haider	(wk)
Chris Hartley	(wk)^{1}	Ashir Zaidi
Nathan Bracken		Asim Kamal
Stuart Clark		Bazid Khan
Dan Cullen		Faisal Iqbal
Brad Hodge		Hasan Raza
James Hopes		Imran Farhat
Phil Jaques		Mansoor Amjad
Mitchell Johnson		Mohammad Asif
Mick Lewis		Mohammad Irshad
Marcus North		Mohammad Sami
Dominic Thornely		Najaf Shah
Shane Watson		Salman Butt
		Shahid Nazir
		Shoaib Malik
		Tahir Khan	(ODs only)
		Umar Gul
		Yasir Arafat	(ODs only)
		Naveed Iqbal Malik

- ^{1} Haddin suffered a broken finger while playing against Pakistan A of the third day of the second four-day match. Chris Hartley was called up to replace him as wicket-keeper, while Michael Hussey was asked to captain the team for the three one-day matches.

== Schedule ==
Date	Match	Venue
September; 11-14	PAK A v AUS A, 1st FC match	Rawalpindi Cricket Stadium
17–20	PAK A v AUS A, 2nd FC match	Khan Research Labs Ground
23	PAK A v AUS A, 1st OD match	Gaddafi Stadium
25	PAK A v AUS A, 2nd OD match	Bagh-e-Jinnah Cricket Ground
27	PAK A v AUS A, 3rd OD match	Gaddafi Stadium

== Match details ==
=== First-class series ===
==== First Match: Pakistan A v Australia A, 11 September–13 September ====
Pakistan A won by seven wickets

Rain and poor conditions stopped play early on the first two days at Rawalpindi, but the conditions were friendly for the home side's bowlers, who got 20 wickets for 326 runs in total in the match. Shahid Nazir took three wickets on the first day, removing Michael Hussey and Shane Watson for single-figure scores, while Mohammad Sami took care of Brad Hodge and captain Brad Haddin. The tourists did recover from 43 for 4, however, thanks to Phil Jaques. He hit 56 on the first day and added a further 36 on the second, while his team mates deserted him and the team was all out for 196, Shoaib Malik wrapping up the tail with two wickets.

Most of the Pakistani batsmen got starts on the second day, but only two passed 30 - Bazid Khan and, surprisingly, Mohammad Sami. Sami and wicket-keeper Zulqarnain Haider fought back with a 49-run stand for the seventh wicket, and Pakistan were 181 for 7 by the close of the second day's play. On the third morning, Zulqarnain battled on, adding 47 with Mansoor Amjad before Cam White dismissed Amjad and Watson removed Umar Gul and Shahid Nazir quickly.

Trailing by 17 on first innings, Australia A were once again shocked by Sami, but Umar Gul also joined the fray as the first five wickets fell for 33 runs. Only Hussey passed ten of the top five, and it was only thanks to 30s from captain Haddin and Nathan Bracken that Australia passed 100. Chasing 114 to win, Salman Butt and Shoaib Malik flayed the Australian opening bowlers, as Bracken ended with 4-0-26-0 and Mick Lewis with 3-1-19-0. They were both dismissed by White, who got three wickets, yet conceded 36 in 5.5 overs. Pakistan A reached their target in 19.5 overs, taking a convincing victory. Scorecard from Pakistan Cricket Board

==== Second Match: Pakistan A v Australia A, 17 September–20 September ====
Match drawn

Australia A dominated the first day, mostly thanks to 146 from James Hopes, who had come in as a replacement for Phil Jaques. The Pakistani bowling attack who had been so effective a week earlier had been replaced, with only Mansoor Amjad retained from the previous game, and the Pakistan A team had seven new faces. They conceded 19 no-balls in a day, as Australia A racked up 318 runs for the loss of five wickets, and Hopes scored 146. The second day was rained off, but the tourists added 89 in 17 overs on the third day, as Shane Watson got a half-century. Pakistan A, batting second, had Hasan Raza to thank for even getting near a competitive score - the 23-year-old batsman added 111 not out from number five, defying off spinner Dan Cullen to help Pakistan A to 249 for 6 at the close of play on day three.

Raza was dismissed early on the fourth morning, lbw to Stuart Clark for 116, Pakistan A's only century of the series. Stubborn resistance from Mansoor Amjad and Mohammad Irshad, however, added 74 for the ninth wicket in about 30 overs, before Marcus North got two wickets with his first three balls on tour, ending with the figures of 0.3-0-0-2. With a slender lead of 59, Australia A batted out 48 overs with Michael Hussey scoring 101 not out, as Australia A added 181 for no loss before the captains agreed to a draw. Cricinfo scorecard

=== One-day Series ===
==== First Match: Pakistan A v Australia A, 23 September ====
Australia A won by seven wickets

Australia A recorded their first win of the series, as their bowlers backed up captain Hussey's decision to bowl first. After five overs, Pakistan A had scampered seven runs, before Salman Butt gave a catch to Hussey. Catches were indeed the favoured dismissal method of the day - all ten Pakistan A batsmen were caught, but none by the wicket-keeper Chris Hartley. Pakistan A never got off the mark, and they were 36 for 6 after 17.5 overs. A small fight-back by Hasan Raza and Zulqarnain, whose seventh-wicket stand was worth 29, was ended when the latter was caught by Hopes, and despite a six from Mohammad Sami, Pakistan A closed on 96 all out. Yasir Arafat took two wickets with three balls for Pakistan, but Jaques remained confident, smashing ten fours in front of the square in his 64. Australia A eased to 97 for 3, winning with over two thirds of their innings potentially remaining. Scorecard from The Cricket Site

==== Second Match: Pakistan A v Australia A, 25 September ====
Pakistan A won by eight wickets

Australia A lost four wickets with the first 43 balls, and though they managed to face every single one but one of the 300 allotted balls, their total was not enough to defend against Pakistan's batsmen. Umar Gul got the most wickets, dismissing James Hopes, Marcus North, Mike Hussey and Mick Lewis on his way to four for 51, while Mohammad Asif bowled five no-balls and still conceded 35. Only two players made it past 15 for Australia; captain Hussey scored 31 and shared a 63-run stand with Cam White, who went on to make an unbeaten 106. It was to be the highest score of the match, but though Lewis had Ashar Zaidi lbw for 12 in the fourth over, Pakistan A only lost one further wicket in chasing the target. Shoaib Malik got his century, hitting four sixes and twelve fours, and Pakistan A ended with a total of 208 for 2 in 35.5 overs. (Cricinfo scorecard)

==== Third Match: Pakistan A v Australia A, 27 September ====
Australia A won by 97 runs

Australia A came back from the defeat two days earlier, and, at the same stadium (Gaddafi Stadium), it was the tourists who handed out a victory which by the net run rate method was just as comprehensive as Pakistan A's two days earlier. Once again, their first four wickets fell with the batsmen on sub-11 scores, but it took time to get them out; Marcus North made 10 off 26 balls and Hussey two runs off 21. At the same time, Phil Jaques was hitting runs at the other end, ensuring that the score was 87 for 4 after 19.2 overs. Yasir Arafat, who got the wickets of North and Hussey and bowled two maiden overs, nevertheless conceded 60 in his other eight overs to end with figures of 10–2–60–2, and with 44 from Shane Watson and 59 not out for White, Australia A posted a total of 273 for 7 when their 50 overs had been completed. Pakistan A then lost four wickets in 31 balls, Salman Butt, Zaidi, Imran Farhat and Hasan Raza all departing in single figures to see Pakistan to 16 for 4. Stuart Clark and Nathan Bracken were the perpetrators, and when the ball changed hands, wickets fell again. Seven men bowled for Australia; all of them got at least one wicket, while Dan Cullen joined Bracken and Clark in getting two, despite bowling the least of all the seven. Cullen dismissed Umar Gul for two in the 37th over, and two overs later he got the last wicket of the match by taking a return catch off Bazid Khan's bat. Khan had made 95, the highest score of the innings by some distance, as the second-highest score was 25. Pakistan A were all out for 176, and lost the series 1–2. (Cricinfo scorecard)
