= Louis Smith (cricketer) =

Australian cricketer

Personal information
- Full name: Louis Russell Cordiner Smith
- Born: 9 January 2005 (age 21)
- Batting: Right-handed
- Bowling: Right arm fast-medium

Career statistics
Competition	First-class
Matches	1
Runs scored	15
Batting average	15.00
100s/50s	0/0
Top score	15
Balls bowled	60
Wickets	1
Bowling average	37.00
5 wickets in innings	0
10 wickets in match	0
Best bowling	1/31
Catches/stumpings	1/–
- Source: CricketArchive, 21 July 2025

Louis Russell Cordiner Smith (born 9 January 2005) is an Australian cricketer. A right-arm fast bowler, he made his first-class cricket debut for Australia A on 13 July 2025 against Sri Lanka A.

== Career ==
From Tasmania, Smith played for University of Tasmania and played club cricket in Darwin, although he missed most of the 2023-24 summer with a knee injury.

He was called-up to the Australia A cricket team in 2025 as a late injury replacement for Jack Nisbet and made his first-class debut against Sri Lanka A in July 2025.

== Personal life ==
He played for the University of Tasmania alongside his brother Sam, with the pair both scoring centuries in the same day in 2023.
