= Muhammad Abbas (New Zealand cricketer) =

New Zealand cricketer

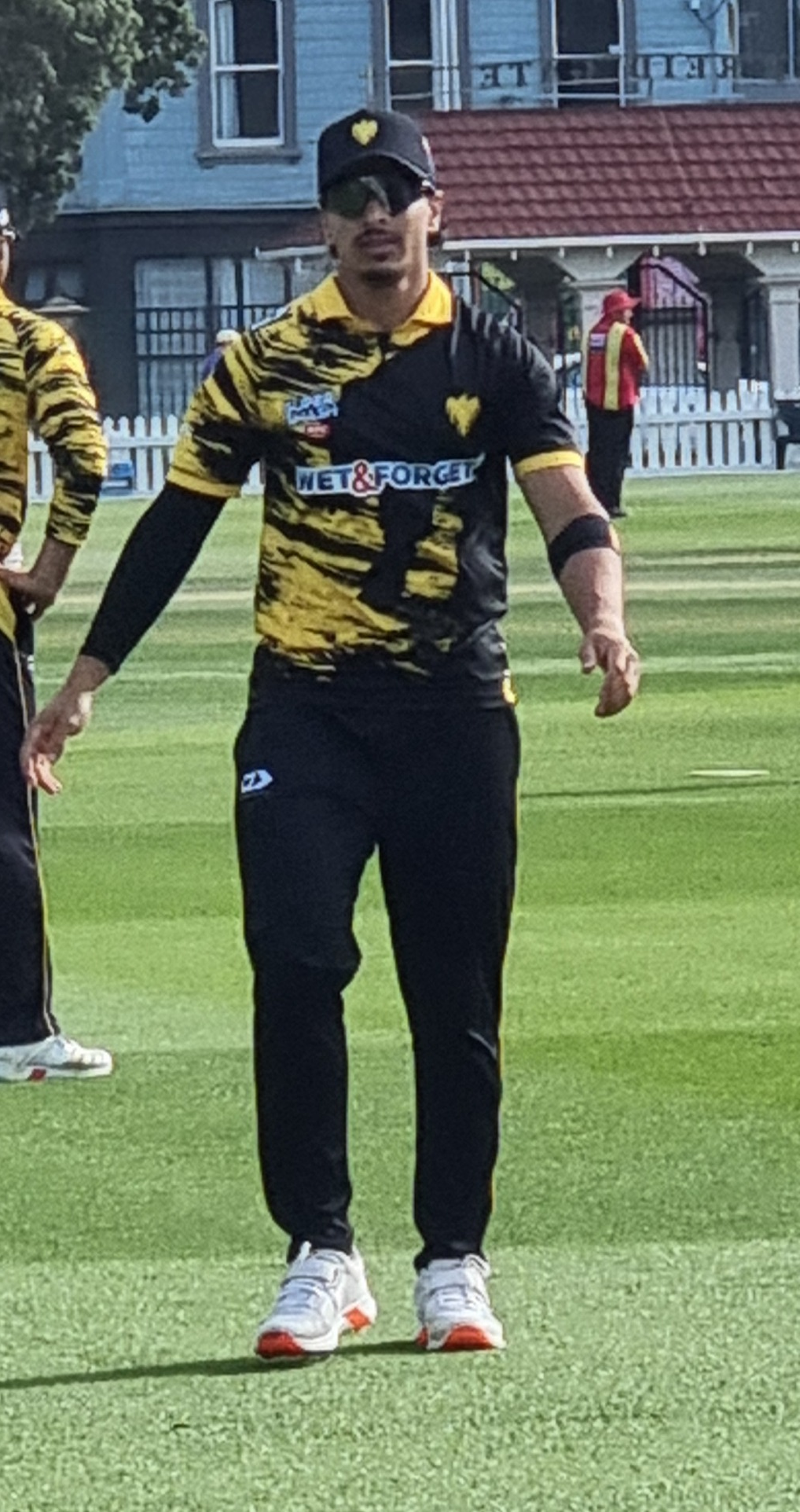
- Abbas playing for the Wellington Firebirds in 2026.

Personal information
- Full name: Muhammad Arslan Abbas
- Born: 29 November 2003 (age 22); Lahore, Punjab, Pakistan
- Batting: Right-handed
- Bowling: Left-arm medium-fast
- Role: Batter
- Relatives: Azhar Abbas (father)

International information
- National side: New Zealand (2025—present)
- ODI debut (cap 222): 29 March 2025 v Pakistan
- Last ODI: 23 April 2026 v Bangladesh

Domestic team information
- Years: Team
- 2022/23–present: Wellington (squad no. 4)

Career statistics
Competition	ODI	FC	LA	T20
Matches	6	27	35	29
Runs scored	162	1,518	972	590
Batting average	27.00	31.62	32.40	24.58
100s/50s	0/1	2/6	2/7	0/3
Top score	52	130	110*	72
Balls bowled	90	943	546	114
Wickets	2	19	11	2
Bowling average	37.50	34.47	55.54	86.00
5 wickets in innings	0	1	0	0
10 wickets in match	0	0	0	0
Best bowling	1/16	5/69	3/34	1/19
Catches/stumpings	1/–	9/–	11/–	7/–
- Source: ESPNcricinfo, 23 April 2026

Muhammad Abbas (born 29 November 2003) is a New Zealand cricketer who plays for Wellington and the New Zealand men's cricket team.

== Biography ==
Born in Lahore, Pakistan, Abbas moved to New Zealand as a young child when his father, Azhar Abbas, joined Karori Cricket Club in Wellington. He started playing cricket at a young age and scored his first century at the age of 11.

Abbas attended Marshall Laing Primary School and later King's College, Auckland, where he played for the first XI for four years under the coaching of former New Zealand spinner Dipak Patel. He focused more on his bowling growing up, learning from his father.

In the 2018 season, Abbas scored seven centuries.

In December 2022, the Abbas family settled in Wellington, and he joined his father's former club, Karori.

On 25 February 2023, Abbas made his first-class cricket debut for Wellington against Otago. In July 2023, he was awarded a contract with Wellington. In August 2023, Abbas was selected to play for New Zealand A in a series against Australia A.

On 29 March 2025, he made his ODI debut for New Zealand against Pakistan in the first game of a 3-match series. In this match he set a new world record for the fastest 50 on debut in an ODI (in terms of balls faced). He was caught on the boundary from the last ball of the innings with 52 runs off 26 balls. He also took one wicket, dismissing the Pakistani captain Mohammad Rizwan.
