= Azhar Abbas (cricketer) =

Pakistani cricketer (born 1975)

Azhar Abbas Haraj
Personal information
- Born: 1 April 1975 (age 51); Khanewal, Punjab, Pakistan
- Batting: Right-handed
- Bowling: Right-arm medium

Azhar Abbas Haraj (Urdu: اظہر عباس ہراج) is a Pakistani-New Zealand cricket coach and former cricketer. Azhar is a bowling coach for Wellington Firebirds in New Zealand having previously coached Auckland Aces. As a player, he appeared for the Auckland Aces and Wellington Firebirds in the New Zealand State Championship. He is a founding member of PTI (Pakistan Tehreek-e-Insaf) Sports and Cultural Wing. He is also founder of New Zealand Pace Foundation.

== Early life and family ==
Azhar Abbas was born on 1 April 1975 in Abdul Hakim Khanewal, Punjab, Pakistan to a Farmer's Family. At the age of 14, He was moved to Lahore to complete his education and Sports (Cricket) interests.

Abbas is a married to Shazia; the couple has two daughters and a son, Muhammad Abbas, who plays first-class cricket for Wellington Firebirds.

== Career ==
Azhar Abbas played most of his cricket in Pakistan, England and New Zealand as a fast bowler, he was named to a wider Pakistan squad in 1997 and 2005 but did not make the final team against Sri Lanka and India. After meeting former New Zealand cricketer Richard Petrie in England, Abbas joined the Karori Cricket Club in Wellington. He later join Eden Roskill Cricket Club in 2005 as a Head of Cricket.

Now he is a NZC Level 3 cricket coach. From 2015 to 2021 he was a bowling coach for Auckland Aces. From 2022 he has worked in the same role for Wellington Firebirds. He is also a founder of NZ Pace Academy.

== See also ==
https://www.espncricinfo.com/story/nz-vs-pak-the-muhammad-abbas-story-1478649

https://www.thepost.co.nz/sport/360631603/black-caps-v-pakistan-remarkable-cricketing-journey-azhar-abbas-and-his-son-muhammad-odi-debut-looms

https://gulfnews.com/sport/cricket/former-pakistan-cricketer-s-son-makes-history-for-new-zealand-1.500077183

https://timesofindia.indiatimes.com/sports/cricket/news/lahore-born-new-zealand-batter-muhammad-abbas-sets-record-for-fastest-fifty-on-odi-debut/articleshow/119707276.cms

https://www.hindustantimes.com/cricket/lahoreborn-muhammad-abbas-breaks-pandyas-odi-world-record-on-debut-playing-for-new-zealand-against-pakistan-101743229205046.html

https://www.facebook.com/WisdenCric/posts/21-year-old-muhammad-abbas-son-of-former-pakistan-domestic-cricketer-azhar-abbas/991850833060703/

https://www.stuff.co.nz/sport/360632668/black-caps-v-pakistan-remarkable-cricketing-journey-azhar-abbas-and-his-son-muhammad-odi-debut-looms

- List of Auckland representative cricketers

https://www.scoop.co.nz/stories/CU2109/S00169/coaching-trio-on-board-for-2021-22.htm

https://www.thepost.co.nz/sport/360631603/black-caps-v-pakistan-remarkable-cricketing-journey-azhar-abbas-and-his-son-muhammad-odi-debut-looms

https://www.stuff.co.nz/sport/cricket/130950968/allrounder-muhammad-abbas-turns-heads-for-wellington-at-under19-nationals

https://sports.ndtv.com/cricket/lahore-born-new-zealand-debutant-muhammad-abbas-breaks-india-stars-all-time-odi-record-with-blitz-vs-pakistan-8038825

https://tribune.com.pk/story/2536341/former-pakistani-cricketers-son-muhammad-abbas-to-play-against-pakistan?amp=1

https://www.india.com/sports/pakistan-born-new-zealand-cricketers-all-round-performance-on-debut-breaks-indian-all-rounder-world-record-his-name-is-7719353/

https://indianexpress.com/article/sports/cricket/who-is-muhammad-abbas-lahore-born-fastest-odi-fifty-debut-new-zealand-vs-pakistan-9912664/lite/

https://www.livemint.com/sports/cricket-news/meet-muhammad-abbas-pakistan-born-new-zealand-cricketer-who-broke-india-batter-krunal-pandya-odi-world-record-nz-vs-pak-11743241605846.html

https://www.geosuper.tv/latest/42796-who-is-mohammad-abbas-lahore-born-new-zealand-cricketer-in-the-spotlight

https://m.facebook.com/NZpa0for10/
