= Michael Jeh =

Sri Lankan cricketer

Personal information
- Full name: Michael Pradeep Williams Jeh
- Born: 21 April 1968 (age 58); Colombo, Ceylon
- Batting: Right-handed
- Bowling: Right-arm medium
- Role: Bowler

Domestic team information
- Years: Team
- 1992–1993: Oxford University
- FC debut: 14 April 1992 Oxford Univ v Durham
- Last FC: 9 July 1997 MCC v Pakistan A
- LA debut: 5 May 1992 Combined Universities v Glamorgan
- Last LA: 27 April 1993 Combined Universities v Hampshire

Career statistics
Competition	First class	List A
Matches	20	2
Runs scored	137	28
Batting average	8.56	–
100s/50s	0/0	0/0
Top score	30	20
Balls bowled	3,298	96
Wickets	46	1
Bowling average	44.50	71
5 wickets in innings	1	0
10 wickets in match	0	0
Best bowling	5/63	1/37
Catches/stumpings	5/0	0/0
- Source: CricketArchive, 24 January 2012

Michael Pradeep Williams Jeh (born 21 April 1968) is a former cricketer who played for the Marylebone Cricket Club and Oxford University.

Jeh was born in Colombo, Ceylon and emigrated to Australia as a refugee at the age of 15. After graduating from Griffith University, he attended Oxford University, where he studied as a postgraduate.

== Cricket career ==
While studying at Oxford, Jeh played first class cricket for Oxford and Combined Universities. He later played a single first class match for Marylebone Cricket Club. Jeh also played for Valley District Cricket Club in Brisbane Grade Cricket, where he was a teammate of Matthew Hayden and a number of other Test and First-Class cricketers.
