= Tim Paine =

Australian cricketer (born 1984)

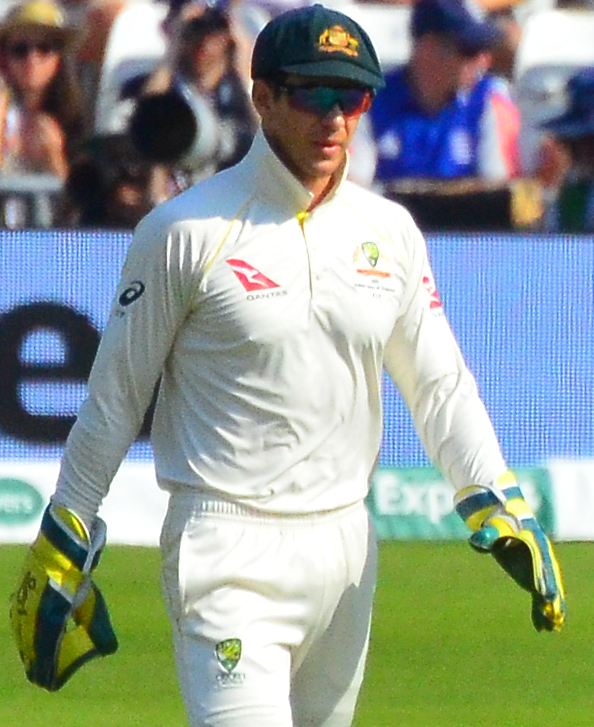
- Paine during the 3rd Test at Headingley, 2019 Ashes

Personal information
- Full name: Timothy David Paine
- Born: 8 December 1984 (age 41); Hobart, Tasmania, Australia
- Nickname: Kid
- Height: 180 cm (5 ft 11 in)
- Batting: Right-handed
- Bowling: Right-arm medium
- Role: Wicket-keeper-batter

International information
- National side: Australia (2009–2021)
- Test debut (cap 414): 13 July 2010 v Pakistan
- Last Test: 15 January 2021 v India
- ODI debut (cap 178): 28 August 2009 v Scotland
- Last ODI: 24 June 2018 v England
- ODI shirt no.: 36
- T20I debut (cap 41): 30 August 2009 v England
- Last T20I: 10 October 2017 v India
- T20I shirt no.: 36

Domestic team information
- Years: Team
- 2005/06–2022/23: Tasmania
- 2011: Pune Warriors India
- 2012/13-2017/18, 2022/23: Hobart Hurricanes

Head coaching information
- Years: Team
- 2026-present: Multan Sultans

Career statistics
Competition	Test	ODI	FC	LA
Matches	35	35	150	136
Runs scored	1,534	890	6,395	3,971
Batting average	32.63	27.81	30.02	33.36
100s/50s	0/9	1/5	3/35	8/17
Top score	92	111	215	134
Catches/stumpings	150/7	51/4	506/23	183/22
Medal record
Representing Australia
ICC Champions Trophy
Winner	2009 South Africa
- Source: ESPNcricinfo, 3 November 2022

Timothy David Paine (born 8 December 1984) is an Australian former cricketer and a former captain of the Australia national cricket team in Test cricket. A right-handed batsman and a wicket-keeper, he played for the Tasmanian Tigers in Australian domestic cricket and was the captain of the Hobart Hurricanes before his selection for Australia in the 2017–18 Ashes series. During his time with Australia, Paine won the 2009 ICC Champions Trophy.

A product of the Australian Cricket Academy, Paine became the youngest-ever contracted player in Australia, when he received a rookie contract with Tasmania at 16 years of age. He made both his first-class and one-day debuts for Tasmania in 2005, scoring a one-day century later in the 2005–06 season, and a double-century, 215, in his next innings. He was a part of the state's maiden Sheffield Shield victory that season and also their 2007–08 one-day winning team. Paine made his ODI debut for Australia as a replacement for regular wicket-keeper Brad Haddin in 2009 against Scotland. A further injury to Haddin in 2010 paved the way for Paine's Test debut against Pakistan in England. Soon after, he played in another two Tests against India, before Haddin's recovery for the 2010–11 Ashes series. From that time – including almost two full seasons lost to injury – he was not a regular in the Australian cricket team from April 2011 until his recall for the 2017–18 Ashes series.

After former Australian captain Steve Smith admitted to involvement in a ball-tampering incident during the Third Test against South Africa in March 2018, Smith and vice-captain David Warner were stood down from their leadership positions mid-match. Paine was announced as the interim captain for the final two days of the game and later confirmed as the 46th captain of the Australian Test team. Paine stepped down as Australia's Test captain in November 2021 due to an occasion of improper conduct off the field during 2017 in which he sent explicit messages to a female co-worker. He did not play for Australia again, and in 2023 retired from all formats of cricket.

== Early life ==
Paine captained Tasmania at Under-15 and Under-17 level, along with being a member of its Under-19 team at the age of just fifteen. He was vice-captain of the Australian Under-17, before scoring a first-class century for his University at Hobart. "He was always the smallest one playing cricket," his father, John said. "We lived in a fairly quiet street and we lived right next to the beach [in the suburb of Lauderdale] so they used to play a fair bit of beach cricket. We used to have a cricket pitch in our backyard which was the driveway and the next-door neighbours had a turf wicket which the boys used to roll and mow and do all that sort of stuff. So he had to learn from an early age I suppose to be a bit stronger and a bit more competitive." As a junior, Paine was a talented Australian rules player—considered good enough to make the Australian Football League (AFL)—and his brother Nick, one of four siblings, plays in the Tasmanian Football League with the Clarence Football Club. Paine's uncle, Robert Shaw, was an AFL player and coach. He attended secondary school at Bayview Secondary College and Rosny College.

At 16, Paine became Australian domestic cricket's youngest-ever contracted player when he received a basic A$10,000 rookie contract with Tasmania—an innovation in Australian cricket. After Cricket Australia allowed rookie contracts Paine said, "These new contracts are a great idea; I'm pretty happy about them anyway! It's good to give young players something [along these lines] to show them that they're in the back of the minds of the administrators and the coaches."

In December 2003, he was announced captain of the Australian Under-19 team for the 2004 U-19 World Cup in Bangladesh, played in February and March 2004. Relieved of wicket-keeping duties, Paine scored 142 runs at an average of 23.66 and took two catches, along with taking seven wickets at an average of 22.28 in eight matches. However, Australia lost the Under-19 Plate Championship final to Bangladesh.

== Cricket career ==
=== 2005–2009: Early domestic career ===
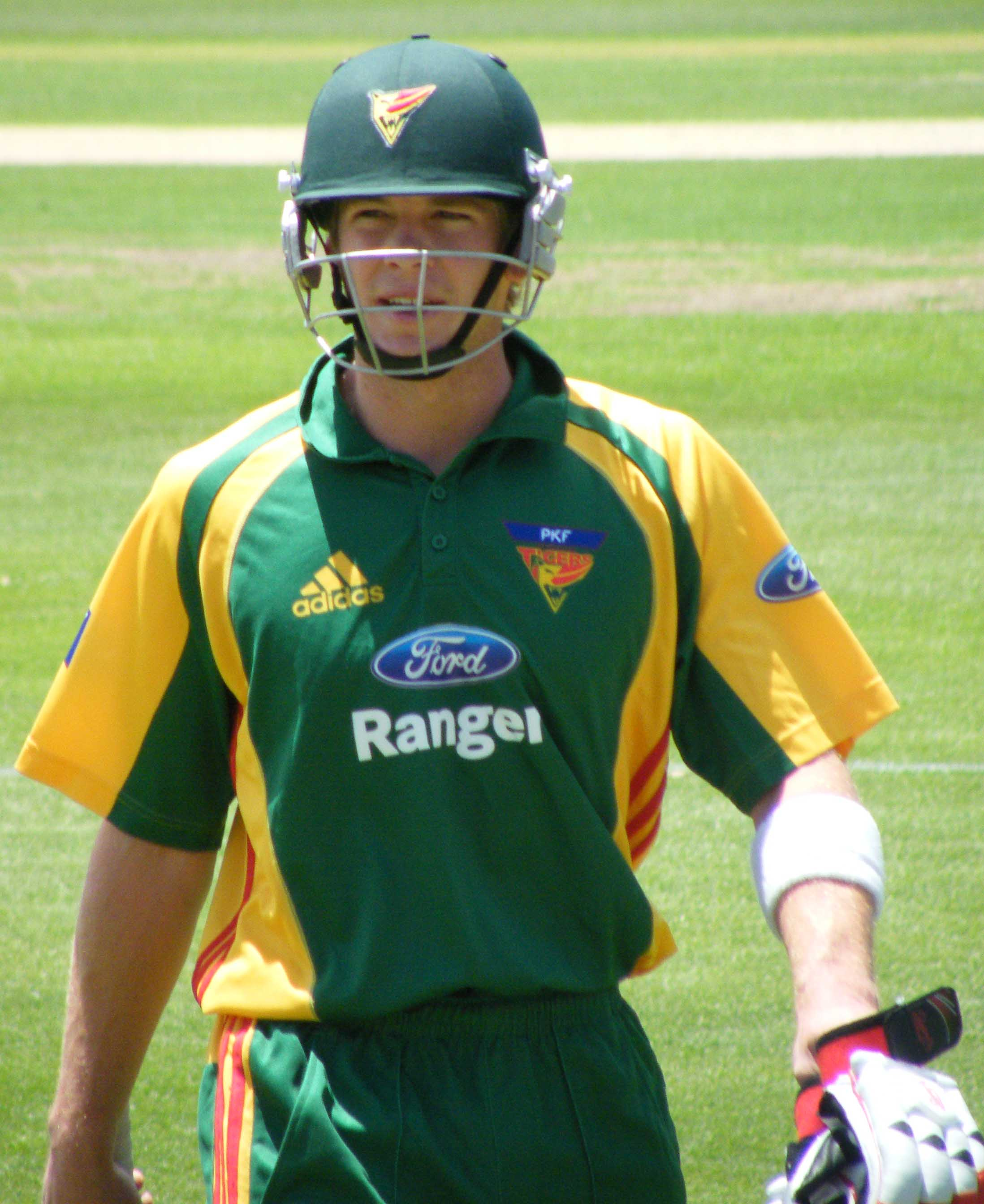
Paine playing for Tasmania in 2008

Paine made his Tasmanian debut as solely an opening batsman in November 2005, during an ING Cup one-day match against Western Australia in Perth, scoring 28 from 44 balls. His first-class debut came shortly after as an opener when Tasmania played South Australia in Hobart during December. Opening the batting, Paine scored a duck (zero) in the first innings and 17 in the second as the match was drawn. He made his maiden List A century in his first season, scoring 111 in the ING Cup. The following season his made his maiden first-class century with 215 against Western Australia in a Pura Cup match at Perth in October 2006.

For the first part of his career he was Tasmania's second wicket-keeper, behind Sean Clingeleffer, particularly at first-class level, before taking Clingeleffer's place permanently in late 2007. Paine played as an opening batsman in Tasmania's maiden Sheffield Shield season triumph in 2006–07, scoring zero and five. Despite his low scores in the final, Paine was Tasmania's highest run scorer in the one-day competition that season. He continued with one-day performances in the following season in which Tasmania won the Ford Ranger Cup, aggregating 261 runs and collecting 21 dismissals. 2008–09 saw Paine score 445 Sheffield Shield runs at 29.66 along with 42 dismissals.

His growing maturity saw him become Tasmanian vice-captain ahead of the 2009–10 season. In early 2009, Paine was selected to play for Australia 'A' against Pakistan 'A' in a series of one-day and first-class matches. Playing at the Allan Border Field in Brisbane, Paine scored 134 off 136 balls in the third one-day match to secure a series win for the Australian 'A' team.

=== 2009–10: Early international career ===
In 2009, Paine was selected for the national squad for the One Day International series against England, shortly after the conclusion of the Ashes Test series, when incumbent wicketkeeper Brad Haddin returned home for surgery on a broken finger. Paine made his ODI debut in a one-off match against Scotland, scoring 29 not out from 38 balls in Australia's total of 345 all out. He then took a single catch, as they were eventual victors by 189 runs. Paine made his International Twenty20 (T20) debut against England on 30 August 2009 at Old Trafford, ahead of the upcoming seven match ODI series between the two teams. England were in trouble at 2/4 (two wickets for four runs), in reply to Australia's 145, before rain caused the match to be abandoned. Paine was not required to bat, as he was listed to come in at the traditional wicket-keepers' position of seven. The second and final T20 match of the short series was also abandoned without a ball being bowled. Paine played his second ODI in the first match of the following ODI series. Australia batted first, with Paine run out in the third over for a duck, scored from six balls; however, he collected two dismissals and a run-out, in England's four-run defeat. His performances steadily improved, with 26, 29, 51 and 16 respectively, before scoring his maiden ODI century in the sixth match of the series at Trent Bridge . Paine was eventually dismissed for 111 from 148 balls, as Australia took a 6–0 series lead.

After losing the final ODI in England, Australia won the 2009 ICC Champions Trophy in South Africa. In their second group match against India, Paine scored his second half-century (56). However, he struggled for consistency in Australia's remaining matches and finished with 123 runs at an average of 24.60. Touring India for a seven match ODI series in late October and early November, Paine broke his finger while attempting to catch a ball in India's innings of the second ODI in Nagpur. He was subsequently sent home and replaced by Graham Manou after the match.

On return from injury, Paine was Tasmania's leading run-scorer for the 2009–10 domestic Twenty20 tournament, hitting 166 runs at 33.20 while opening the batting. However, Tasmania struggled and finished last. When Haddin was rested from national duties for two ODIs against the West Indies in February 2010, Paine was again his replacement, scoring 16 and 24. Tasmanian came off the bottom of the ladder after winning their last three one-day matches to qualify for the 2009–10 Ford Ranger Cup Final against Victoria. There, Paine scored his fifth List A century, 100 from 118 balls, as Tasmania completed a comfortable victory—their fourth one-day title. Victoria's loss was their fourth successive one-day final loss.

=== 2010: Test debut against Pakistan ===
Although Paine was in the Australia squad for the 2010 World Twenty20 in the West Indies, he was not called upon, as Australia made the final where they were defeated by England. Nevertheless, this was the team's best performance out of their three World Twenty20 campaigns. Australia proceeded to tour the United Kingdom for a single one-dayer against Ireland, five one-day games against England, before two Twenty20 Internationals and two Tests against Pakistan in England. Pakistan played Australia in England because of safety concerns in the Asian country. The Test series were the first time England hosted a neutral Test since 1912, when Australia, England and South Africa took part in a triangular tournament. Haddin was unable to overcome an elbow injury and missed the series'. Paine started the tour well, compiling 81 in Australia's victory over Ireland. However, he struggled to capitalise on good starts in the series against England, scoring 26, 16, 44, 8 and 54. Despite winning the final two games, Australia lost the series 3–2. The team also lost the Twenty20 series 2–0 against Pakistan, and Paine struggled, scoring one and zero. He batted at eight in the batting order for the first match and three in the second.

He made his debut in the First Test at Lord's, London, and scored 7 and 47 with the bat; later admitting that the first 30 balls he faced in the first innings were a blur. Paine also took five catches, along with a leg-side stumping in Australia's comfortable victory. The match was the first occasion where three Tasmanians played in the same Test team—Ricky Ponting, Ben Hilfenhaus and Paine—marking significant improvement in the quality of cricket in the state. In the Second Test at Headingley Cricket Ground, Leeds, Paine's first innings score of 17 was his team's highest in their lowly total of 88. He managed a further 33 runs in Australia's second innings, and made five catches in the match. However, the team lost the match by four wickets, thus drawing the series 1–1. After the series—where he captured 12 dismissals and scored 104 runs—Paine noted that the primary difference from Sheffield Shield to Test cricket was "the intensity that Test cricket is played at and how much it means," and how "It's hard work, really hard work; I've never had that sort of pressure for four or five days before." Paine was nominated for the International Cricket Council's emerging player of the year award in August and was named Tasmanian Sports Personality of the Year in September.

After close to a month without international cricket, Australia toured India for two Tests and three one-day games in October, in what would be the team's last Test series ahead of the summer's Ashes in Australia. Haddin again failed to recover sufficiently for the series and Paine was named wicket-keeper. In a drawn three-day first-class match before the Test series, Paine scored a slow 45 and zero; failing to capitalise on his promotion to four in the batting order for the second innings. Returning to the traditional wicket-keepers spot of seven for the Test series, Paine battled to his highest Test score, 92 from 196 balls, in the first innings of the First Test in Mohali. In hot conditions, he displayed good shot selection and concentration, despite suffering from cramp in the latter stages of his innings. Still, when Australia was bowled out soon after his dismissal, Paine assumed wicket-keeper duties for India's innings, where he took two catches. In his team's second innings, however, Paine scored only nine, as Australia collapsed to set India a target of 216 runs. They achieved the score with just one wicket remaining; Paine taking one catch. After the Test, Melbourne newspaper The Herald Sun, wrote an article saying that Paine could become Australia's future Test captain. The Second Test saw him continue his good form with the bat, scoring 59 and 9, but Australia lost the match and the series 2–0. Afterwards, former Australian wicket-keeper Rodney Marsh suggested it would be hard for Haddin to regain his spot in the Australian team for The Ashes. India won the opening one-dayer and therefore took the series 1–0 when rain washed out the remaining two matches. Paine struggled in the match, compiling 9 from 24 balls.

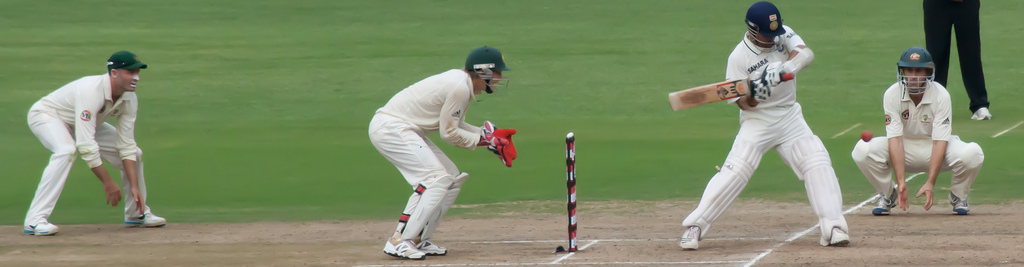
Paine keeping wicket in Bangalore during the two-match Test series against India in October 2010.

Paine resumed his commitments with an in-form Tasmanian outfit in late-October, after Haddin—returning from injury—replaced him in the Australian team for three one-day games against Sri Lanka where they lost 2–1. Nonetheless, Paine was selected as Australia A wicket-keeper for a pre-Ashes tour match against England in Hobart in November.

=== 2011–2017 ===
Paine sustained a finger injury in a match in November 2010, but was then named captain of the Prime Minister's XI for a match against the touring England team on 10 January 2011 in which he scored 50. On 7 January 2011, Paine was named Vice Captain of Australia's Twenty20 team. However he played his last T20 game for Australia on 14 January 2011. He then captained Australia A in Zimbabwe, but in August 2011 re-injured his finger at state training This paved the way for Matthew Wade to become Australian wicketkeeper.

In the 2011 Indian Premier League (IPL) auction, Paine was sold for $270,000 to Sahara Pune Warriors, one of the two new teams in the IPL.

He toured England with Australia A in the northern summer of 2012, and returned to Tasmanian state cricket and the Hobart Hurricanes for the 2012–13 season.

Paine has concentrated more on his batting than on wicket-keeping over the last couple of years, and with the return of Wade to Tasmania, is more often than not playing as a batsman.

In August 2017, he was named in a World XI team to play three Twenty20 International matches against Pakistan in the 2017 Independence Cup in Lahore.

=== 2017–18: Test and ODI comeback ===
At the start of the 2017–18 season, Paine was considering retirement, however was talked out of it by Adam Griffith. On 17 November 2017, Paine was granted an international recall for the first 2 Ashes Tests after a 7-year absence from the national Tests squad after Tasmanian teammate Matthew Wade struggled with batting form domestically and equalled Brad Hogg's record for most tests between successive appearances for an Australian player. This was seen as a shocking decision, as Paine was not regularly playing, nor wicket-keeping, for Tasmania at the time. He was later retained for the entire Ashes series, and also replaced Matthew Wade as the ODI keeper against England.

During the Ashes series, he scored 192 runs in six innings with one Not Out and one 50, at an average of 48. As wicketkeeper, he took 25 catches and made one stumping. He played in 4 of the 5 associated One Day international Series matches against England, scoring 144 runs and taking 6 catches behind the stumps. He did not play in the T20 Tri-series between Australia, England and New Zealand.

On 22 January 2018, he was selected in the fifteen man squad for the four test Australian tour of South Africa.

During the Third Test Match of the tour in Cape Town, Paine was appointed as the interim captain of the Australian team for the final two days after captain Steve Smith and vice-captain David Warner agreed to stand down during the match in the wake of a ball tampering scandal.

As a result of an urgent Cricket Australia investigation into the incident, Smith, Warner and Cameron Bancroft were suspended and sent home. On 28 March 2018, Cricket Australia CEO James Sutherland announced that Paine would continue as captain for the Fourth Test, confirming him as the 46th Captain of the Australian test team.

In April 2018, he was awarded a national contract by Cricket Australia for the 2018–19 season.

=== 2018–2021: Australian captaincy ===
Tim Paine's record as captain
	Matches	Won	Lost	Drawn	Tied	No result	Win %
Tests	23	11	8	4	0	0	47.82%
One-Day Internationals	5	0	5	0	0	0	0%
Date last updated:		19 January 2020					

In May 2018, Paine was named ODI captain for the series in England. However, following Australia's 5–0 ODI whitewash defeat to England, Aaron Finch replaced Paine as ODI Captain prior to a series against South Africa in November 2018, highly likely ending Paine's ODI career. In October 2018, Paine captained Australia during a Test series against Pakistan in the UAE, but lost the series 1–0. Despite captaining Australia for the first time on home soil against India in a four match Test series, Paine's team lost the series 2–1, with India retaining the Border–Gavaskar Trophy and winning its first Test series in Australia.

In January and February 2019, Paine captained Australia in a two Test match series against Sri Lanka. Australia won the series 2–0, with Paine winning his first Test series as captain. In June and July 2019, as preparation for the Ashes series in England, Paine captained the Australia A four-day squad, in first-class matches against Sussex and the England Lions.

In July 2019, he was named as captain in Australia's squad for the 2019 Ashes series in England. Australia retained the Ashes after winning the fourth Test, with England levelling the series 2–2 in the final Test, resulting in the first drawn Ashes series since 1972. Paine became the first Australian Test captain since Steve Waugh in 2001 to retain the Ashes in a series in England. Paine then captained his second home summer with a two Test series against Pakistan and a three Test series against New Zealand, where Australia won all five Tests.

On 27 December 2020, Paine effected his 150th dismissal in his 33rd test, making him the fastest to reach this figure. The previous record was held by Quinton de Kock, who reached 150 dismissals in 35 tests.

==== Resignation and indefinite break ====
On 19 November 2021, Paine announced that he had stepped down as Australia's Test captain, due to an occasion of improper conduct off the field during 2017 in which he sent explicit messages, and an image of his genitals to a female co-worker. On 26 November 2021, Paine said he would take a break from the game "for the foreseeable future". His wife Bonnie commented that she had felt "betrayed" and "hurt" after learning about the incident but had since forgiven him and that they had "put the matter to bed". The woman involved in the case lost her bid, in October 2022, to seek compensation for alleged sexual harassment due to not filing her case in time.

=== Return and retirement ===
In August 2022, it was confirmed that Paine would be making a return to first-class cricket in the 2022–23 season with Tasmania.

On 17 March 2023, Paine announced his retirement from cricket after Tasmania drew with Queensland after the end of the Sheffield Shield. He was given a guard of honour as the match ended.

== Coaching career ==
On 25 August 2023, Paine was appointed as an assistant coach for Adelaide Strikers. In November 2024, Paine was appointed as the head coach for Prime Minister's XI versus India.

In January 2026, Paine was appointed as the head coach of the newly formed Sialkot Stallionz franchise ahead of the 2026 Pakistan Super League season, marking his first major coaching role in the tournament. The Sialkot Stallionz officially announced his appointment on 29 January 2026, describing him as a proven leader with extensive experience at the highest levels of international cricket and expressing confidence in his ability to guide the team in its inaugural campaign. Paine's role involves leading the Stallionz in their debut in PSL 11, which is scheduled to take place from 26 March to 3 May 2026, with the expectation that his leadership and strategic insights will help establish the new franchise's competitive foundation.

== Playing style ==
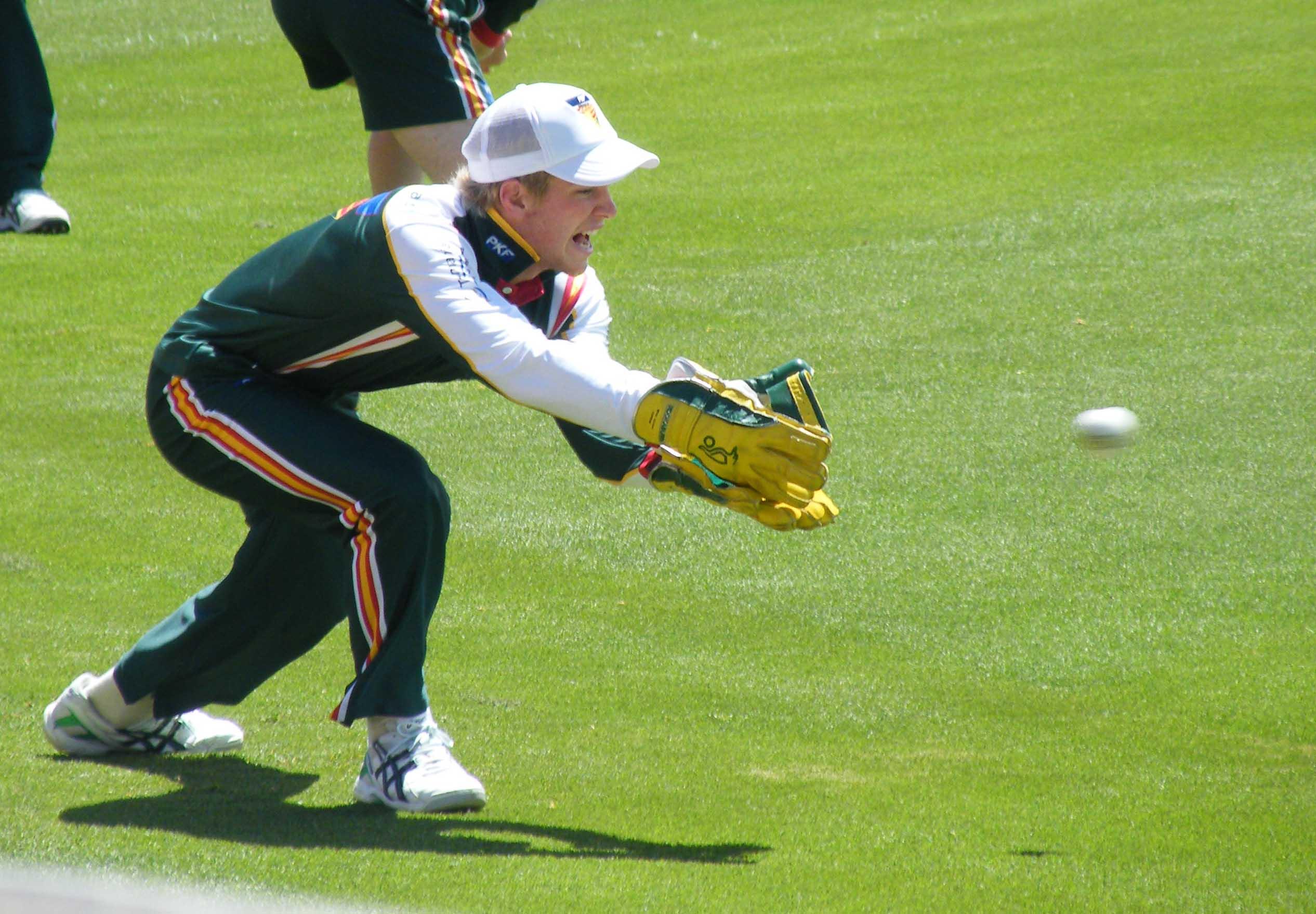
Paine playing for Tasmania in 2008

=== Batting style ===
Paine is an orthodox, 'traditional' right-handed batsman who usually plays with a straight bat. He had occasionally opened the batting in one-day matches but bats at number six or seven in the Australian Test team. Paine uses his wrists and prefers to bat from the crease against spin, though he can play a wide range of shots against all forms of bowling. Paine proved his big-hitting and fast-scoring ability in the 2009–10 Australian domestic T20 tournament, where he had the second-highest scoring rate of players who scored more than 42 runs. He admitted attempting to change his batting style to something similar to former Australian wicketkeepers Adam Gilchrist and Brad Haddin before his international debut. However, he has since reverted to his former more patient game.

== Personal life ==
Paine married nurse Bonnie Maggs in 2016. They have two children.
