= Australia A cricket team =

Second-tier national team

Australia A
- Association: Cricket Australia

Personnel
- Coach: Tim Paine
- Batting coach: Scott Prestwidge
- Bowling coach: Adam Griffith

Team information
- Founded: 1994

History
- First-class debut: South Africa in 19–22 December 1997 at The Gabba
First-class
One-day

The Australia A men's cricket team is a cricket team representing Australia. It is currently used to develop young players and prepare them for the Australian national cricket team, though has seen participation from older, or more established players, as preparation for upcoming series. Originally playing as tour matches alongside the main Australian side, the team has since expanded to participating in their own tours.

== History ==
Australia had sent Second XI teams on overseas tours before—such as their tours of New Zealand in 1949–50 and 1959–60. These teams would consist of players on the fringes of national selection.

In 1994, this team was given an official name, when the 1994–95 Australian Tri-Series was expanded to involve four teams instead of three, with the addition of "Australia A" to the pre-established Australia, England and Zimbabwe. This Australia A team was made up of younger players as part of the selection process for the 1996 Cricket World Cup, with Ricky Ponting, Michael Bevan and Paul Reiffel going from the Australia A side in these games to the squad for the World Cup as David Boon, Tim May and Phil Emery missed out. Games involving Australia A are not official One Day Internationals but are included in the List A statistics when that classification was made official by the International Cricket Council in 2006. During this series, players would regularly be swapped between the 'A' team and the national team.

The team originally played 50-over cricket until their first-class debut against the South Africa national team in 1997. They participated in their first solo tour in 1998, touring Scotland and Ireland.

== Squad ==
This table lists all players who have played for Australia A since 11 October 2025.

- Players who have international caps are in **boldface**.

Name	Age	Batting style	Bowling style	State team	Captain	Last FC	Last LA
Batters
**Peter Handscomb**	35	Right-handed	Right-arm off break	Victoria	(Note: Handscomb captained Australia A in both first-class matches for Australia A's tour of India in 2026–27.)	India A 2026/27	Gloucestershire; 2019
Campbell Kellaway	23	Left-handed	Slow left-arm orthodox	Victoria		India A 2026/27	Sri Lanka A 2025
**Sam Konstas**	21	Right-handed	Right-arm off break	New South Wales		India A 2026/27	India A 2026/27
**Nathan McSweeney**	27	Right-handed	Right-arm off break	South Australia	(Note: McSweeney captained Australia A in first-class for the England Lions' tour of Australia in 2025–26 and the second List A match for Australia A's tour of India in 2026–27.)	India A 2026/27	India A 2026/27
**Matt Renshaw**	30	Left-handed	Right-arm off break	Queensland		England Lions; 2025/26	Sri Lanka A 2025
Jason Sangha	27	Right-handed	Right-arm leg break	South Australia		India A 2026/27	Sri Lanka A 2025
All-rounders
**Nikhil Chaudhary**	30	Right-handed	Right-arm off break	Tasmania		—N/a	India A 2026/27
**Cooper Connolly**	23	Left-handed	Slow left-arm orthodox	Western Australia		England Lions; 2025/26	India A 2025/26
**Mitchell Owen**	25	Right-handed	Right-arm medium	Tasmania		—N/a	India A 2026/27
**Liam Scott**	25	Right-handed	Right-arm fast-medium	South Australia		India A 2026/27	India A 2026/27
**Will Sutherland**	26	Right handed	Right-arm medium-fast	Victoria	(Note: Sutherland captained Australia A for the first List A match for Australia A's tour of India in 2026–27.)	India A 2025/26	India A 2026/27
**Beau Webster**	32	Right-handed	Right-arm medium, off break	Tasmania		England Lions; 2025/26	—N/a
Wicket-keepers
Sam Harper	29	Right-handed	—N/a	Victoria		India A 2026/27	—N/a
**Josh Philippe**	29	Right-handed	—N/a	New South Wales		India A 2026/27	India A 2026/27
Lachlan Shaw	23	Right-handed	—N/a	New South Wales		—N/a	India A 2026/27
Pace bowlers
**Xavier Bartlett**	27	Right-handed	Right-arm fast-medium	Queensland		England Lions; 2025/26	—N/a
**Mahli Beardman**	21	Right-handed	Right-arm fast-medium	Western Australia		—N/a	India A 2026/27
**Brendan Doggett**	32	Right-handed	Right-arm fast-medium	South Australia		India A 2026/27	—N/a
**Ben Dwarshuis**	32	Left-handed	Left-arm fast-medium	New South Wales		New Zealand A 2023	India A 2026/27
Ryan Hadley	27	Right-handed	Right-arm medium-fast	New South Wales		England Lions; 2025/26	—N/a
Liam Hatcher	30	Right-handed	Right-arm medium-fast	New South Wales		India A 2026/27	—N/a
**Spencer Johnson**	30	Left-handed	Left-arm fast	South Australia		New Zealand A 2023	India A 2026/27
**Riley Meredith**	30	Right-handed	Right-arm fast	Tasmania		Pakistan A 2019	India A 2026/27
Fergus O'Neill	25	Right-handed	Right-arm medium	Victoria		India A 2026/27	—N/a
**Jhye Richardson**	30	Right-handed	Right-arm fast	Western Australia		India A 2026/27	India A 2019
Spin bowlers
**Todd Murphy**	25	Left-handed	Right-arm off break	Victoria	(Note: Murphy captained Australia A in the third List A match for Australia A's tour of India in 2026–27.)	India A 2026/27	India A 2026/27
Corey Rocchiccioli	29	Right-handed	Right-arm off break	Western Australia		India A 2026/27	—N/a
**Tanveer Sangha**	24	Right-handed	Right-arm leg break	New South Wales		Sri Lanka A 2025	India A 2026/27
As of 11 October 2026

== Coaching staff ==
The following coaching panel was named ahead of Sri Lanka A's tour of Australia in 2025, as of June 2025.

Position	Name
Head coach	Tim Paine
Batting coach	Scott Prestwidge
Bowling coach	Adam Griffith
Development coach	Trent Keep

== Results summary ==
† Matches that were part of an Australia tour.

Date	Opponent(s)	Location	First-class			List A				T20				Ref
Date	Opponent(s)	Location	W	L	D	W	L	T	NR	W	L	T	NR	Ref
Dec 1994–Jan 1995	Australia, England & Zimbabwe (Quad-Series)	Australia	—			3	5	0	0	—				
Jan 1996	West Indies†	Australia	—			1	0	0	0	—				
Dec 1996	West Indies†	Australia	—			1	0	0	0	—				
Dec 1996	Pakistan†	Australia	—			0	1	0	0	—				
Dec 1997	South Africa†	Australia	0	0	1	—				—				
Jan 1998	New Zealand†	Australia	—			0	1	0	0	—				
Jul–Aug 1998	Scotland	Scotland	0	0	2	2	0	0	3	—				
Jul–Aug 1998	Scotland XI	Scotland	—			1	0	0	0	—				
Jul–Aug 1998	Ireland	Ireland	1	0	0	3	0	0	2	—				
Sep 1999	India A	United States	—			4	1	0	0	—				
Jan 2000	Pakistan†	Australia	—			2	0	0	0	—				
Dec 2000–Jan 2001	West Indies†	Australia	0	0	1	0	1	0	0	—				
Jan 2001	Zimbabwe†	Australia	—			1	0	0	0	—				
Jan 2002	New Zealand†	Australia	—			1	0	0	0	—				
Jan 2002	South Africa†	Australia	—			1	0	0	0	—				
Sep 2002	South Africa A	South Africa	—			5	1	0	1	—				
Nov–Dec 2002	England XI†	Australia	0	0	1	1	0	0	0	—				
Dec 2002–Jan 2003	Sri Lanka †	Australia	—			4	1	0	0	—				
Apr 2003	South Africa A	Australia	0	0	2	3	1	0	1	—				
Dec 2003	India†	Australia	0	0	1	—				—				
Jan 2004	Zimbabwe†	Australia	—			1	1	0	0	—				
Jan 2005	West Indies†	Australia	—			1	1	0	0	—				
Jan 2005	Pakistan†	Australia	—			1	1	0	0	—				
Sep 2005	Pakistan A	Pakistan	0	1	1	2	1	0	0	—				
Sep 2007	Pakistan A	Pakistan	1	0	1	0	3	0	0	—				
Sep 2008	India A	India	0	0	2	—				—				
Sep 2008	India A & New Zealand A (Tri-Series)	India	—			3	2	0	0	—				
Jun–Jul 2010	Sri Lanka A	Australia	2	0	0	0	2	1	0	1	0	0	0	
Nov 2010	England XI†	Australia	0	1	0	—				—				
Nov 2011	New Zealand†	Australia	0	0	1	—				—				
Jul–Aug 2012	Derbyshire	England	0	0	1	—				—				
Jul–Aug 2012	Durham	England	0	1	0	—				—				
Jul–Aug 2012	England Lions	England	0	0	2	—				—				
Nov 2012	South Africa†	Australia	0	0	1	—				—				
Feb–Mar 2013	England Lions	Australia	—			4	0	0	1	—				
Jun 2013	Scotland	Scotland	1	0	0	—				—				
Jun 2013	Ireland	Ireland	1	0	0	—				—				
Jun 2013	Gloucestershire	England	1	0	0	—				—				
Jul–Aug 2013	Zimbabwe Select XI	Zimbabwe	1	0	0	—				—				
Jul–Aug 2013	South Africa A	South Africa	0	1	1	—				—				
Aug 2013	South Africa A & India A (Tri-Series)	South Africa	—			3	2	0	0	—				
Nov 2013	England XI†	Australia	0	0	1	—				—				
Jul 2014	India A	Australia	0	0	2	—				—				
Jul–Aug 2014	India A, South Africa A & National Performance Squad (Quad-Series)	Australia	—			4	3	0	0	—				
Aug 2014	South Africa A	Australia	0	1	1	—				—				
Jul–Aug 2015	India A	India	1	0	1	—				—				
Aug 2015	India A & South Africa A (Tri-Series)	India	—			4	1	0	0	—				
Jul–Aug 2016	South Africa A	Australia	2	0	0	—				—				
Aug–Sep 2016	India A, South Africa A & National Performance Squad (Quad-Series)	Australia	—			3	3	0	1	—				
Sep 2016	India A	Australia	1	0	1	—				—				
Aug 2018	India A, India B & South Africa A (Quad-Series)	India	—			2	2	0	2	—				
Sep 2018	India A	India	1	1	0	—				—				
Jun 2019	Northamptonshire	England	—			1	0	0	0	—				
Jun 2019	Derbyshire	England	—			1	0	0	0	—				
Jun 2019	Worcestershire	England	—			0	0	0	1	—				
Jun 2019	Gloucestershire	England	—			2	0	0	0	—				
Jun 2019	Sussex	England	1	0	0	—				—				
Jun 2019	England Lions	England	0	0	1	—				—				
Nov 2019	Pakistan†	Australia	0	0	1	—				—				
Feb 2020	England Lions	Australia	0	1	0	—				—				
Dec 2020	India†	Australia	0	0	2	—				—				
Dec 2021	England Lions†	Australia	1	0	0	—				—				
June 2022	Sri Lanka A †	Sri Lanka	2	0	0	1	1	0	0	—				
Apr 2023	New Zealand A	New Zealand	0	1	1	—				—				
Aug–Sep 2023	New Zealand A	Australia	2	0	0	3	0	0	0	—				
Oct–Nov 2024	India A†	Australia	2	0	0	—				—				
Jan–Feb 2025	England Lions	Australia	1	0	0	—				—				
Jul 2025	Sri Lanka A	Australia	0	0	2	2	1	0	0	—				
Sep–Oct 2025	India A	India	0	1	1	1	2	0	0	—				
Dec 2025	England Lions†	Australia	1	0	0	—				—				
Sep–Oct 2026	India A	India	0	1	1	2	1	0	0	—				
